= Edmonton Elks all-time records and statistics =

The following is a select list of Edmonton Elks all-time records and statistics current to the 2026 CFL season.

== Grey Cup championships ==
Won, as a player:

- 7 – Bill Stevenson - (1975, 1978-1982, 1987)
- 6 – Dave Cutler - (1975, 1978-1982)
- 6 – Dave Fennell - (1975, 1978-1982)
- 6 – Larry Highbaugh - (1975, 1978-1982)
- 6 – Dan Kepley - (1975, 1978-1982)
- 6 – Dale Potter - (1975, 1978-1982)
- 6 – Tom Towns - (1975, 1978-1982)

Grey Cup games played in:

- 9 – Dave Cutler - (1973-1975, 1977-1982)
- 9 – Larry Highbaugh - (1973-1975, 1977-1982)
- 8 – Ron Estay - (1973-1975, 1977-1981)
- 8 – Bob Howes - (1973-1975, 1977-1981)
- 8 – Tom Wilkinson - (1973-1975, 1977-1981)
- 8 – Dave Fennell - (1974-1975, 1977-1982)
- 8 – Dale Potter - (1974-1975, 1977-1982)
- 8 – Bill Stevenson - (1975, 1977-1982, 1987)

Won, as a head coach:

- 5 – Hugh Campbell - (1978-1982)
- 3 – Pop Ivy - (1954-1956)

Grey Cup appearances for a head coach:

- 6 – Hugh Campbell - (1977-1982)
- 3 – Pop Ivy - (1954-1956)
- 3 – Ray Jauch - (1973-1975)

== Coaching ==
Seasons

- 11 – William "Deacon" White
- 7 – Ray Jauch
- 7 – Ron Lancaster

Games

- 126 – Ron Lancaster
- 112 – Ray Jauch
- 96 – Hugh Campbell
- 96 – Neill Armstrong

Wins

- 83 – Ron Lancaster
- 70 – Hugh Campbell
- 65 – Ray Jauch

Best winning percentage (min. 30 games)

- .781 – Pop Ivy
- .755 – Hugh Campbell
- .667 – Ron Lancaster

Losses

- 56 – Neill Armstrong
- 43 – Ray Jauch
- 43 – Ron Lancaster

Worst winning percentage (min. 30 games)

- .398 – Neill Armstrong
- .407 – Kavis Reed
- .444 – Don Matthews
- .444 – Richie Hall

== Service ==
Most games played

- 274 – Rod Connop
- 268 – Sean Fleming
- 254 – Dave Cutler
- 237 – Chris Morris
- 217 – Blake Dermott

Most seasons played

- 16 – Dave Cutler (1969–1984)
- 16 – Rod Connop (1982–1997)
- 16 – Sean Fleming (1992–2007)
- 14 – Howie Schumm (1959–1972)
- 14 – Blake Dermott (1983–1996)
- 14 – Gizmo Williams (1986–1988, 1990–2000)
- 14 – Chris Morris (1992–2005)

== Scoring ==
Most points – Career

- 2,571 – Sean Fleming
- 2,237 – Dave Cutler
- 756 – Sean Whyte
- 677 – Jackie Parker
- 586 – Brian Kelly

Most points – season

- 224 – Jerry Kauric – 1989
- 211 – Vincent Blanchard – 2026
- 207 – Sean Fleming – 1995
- 204 – Sean Fleming – 1994
- 195 – Dave Cutler – 1977

Most points – game

- 30 – Eric Blount – vs. Winnipeg Blue Bombers, Sept. 15, 1995
- 28 – Vincent Blanchard – vs. Hamilton Tiger-Cats, Sept. 26, 2026
- 24 – Jim Germany – vs. Hamilton Tiger-Cats, Aug. 1, 1981
- 24 – Brian Kelly – vs. Ottawa Rough Riders, June 30, 1984
- 24 – Sean Fleming – at BC Lions, Oct. 29, 1993
- 24 – Kez McCorvey - vs. Winnipeg Blue Bombers, July 21, 2000

Most touchdowns – career

- 97 – Brian Kelly
- 79 – Jackie Parker
- 77 – Norman Kwong
- 71 – Jim Germany
- 69 – Johnny Bright

Most touchdowns – season

- 20 – Blake Marshall – 1991
- 19 – Jim Germany – 1981
- 18 – Brian Kelly – 1984
- 17 – Jackie Parker – 1957
- 17 – Craig Ellis – 1990

Most touchdowns – game

- 5 – Eric Blount – vs. Winnipeg Blue Bombers, Sept. 15, 1995
- 4 – Jim Germany – vs. Hamilton Tiger-Cats, Aug. 1, 1981
- 4 – Brian Kelly – vs. Ottawa Rough Riders, June 30, 1984
- 4 – Kez McCorvey v vs. Winnipeg Blue Bombers, July 21, 2000

Most receiving touchdowns – career

- 97 – Brian Kelly
- 59 – Jason Tucker
- 58 – Tom Scott
- 51 – Waddell Smith
- 49 – Fred Stamps

Most receiving touchdowns – season

- 18 – Brian Kelly – 1984
- 17 – Craig Ellis – 1990
- 15 – Jim Sandusky – 1992
- 15 – Eddie Brown – 1993
- 15 – Kez McCorvey – 2000

Most receiving touchdowns – game

- 4 – Brian Kelly – vs. Ottawa Rough Riders, June 30, 1984
- 4 – Kez McCorvey – vs. Winnipeg Blue Bombers, July 21, 2000

Most rushing touchdowns – career

- 73 – Norman Kwong
- 69 – Johnny Bright
- 65 – Jim Germany
- 64 – Jackie Parker
- 54 – Blake Marshall

Most rushing touchdowns – season

- 18 – Jim Germany – 1981
- 16 – Johnny Bright – 1957
- 16 – Blake Marshall – 1991
- 15 – Normie Kwong – 1957
- 13 – Johnny Bright – 1960
- 13 – Tony Burse – 1997
- 13 – Mike Pringle – 2003
- 13 – Mike Reilly – 2018

Most rushing touchdowns – game

- 4 – Jim Germany – vs. Hamilton Tiger-Cats, Aug. 1, 1981
- 4 – Mike Pringle – vs. Ottawa Renegades, Aug. 29, 2004
- 3 – Mike King – vs. Calgary Stampeders, Sept. 23, 1950
- 3 – Damon Allen – at Winnipeg Blue Bombers, Oct. 18, 1985
- 3 – Blake Marshall – vs. Calgary Stampeders, Sept. 8, 1989
- 3 – Tracy Ham – vs. BC Lions, Sept. 24, 1989
- 3 – Eric Blount – vs. Winnipeg Blue Bombers, Sept. 15, 1995
- 3 – Sean Millington – vs. Saskatchewan Roughriders, Oct. 30, 1999
- 3 – Mike Reilly – at Saskatchewan Roughriders, Nov. 4, 2017
- 3 – Mike Reilly – vs. Calgary Stampeders, Sept. 8, 2018

Most punt return touchdowns – career

- 26 – Gizmo Williams
- 4 – Winston October
- 3 – Eddie Brown
- 3 – Tony Tompkins
- 3 – Tristan Jackson

Most punt return touchdowns – season

- 5 – Gizmo Williams – 1991
- 4 – Gizmo Williams – 1987
- 4 – Gizmo Williams – 1993
- 3 – Gizmo Williams – 1992
- 3 – Eddie Brown – 1994
- 3 – Tony Tompkins – 2005

Most punt return touchdowns – game

- 2 – Gizmo Williams – vs. Calgary Stampeders, June 27, 1987
- 2 – Gizmo Williams – vs. Calgary Stampeders, Sept. 6, 1991
- 2 – Gizmo Williams – vs. Calgary Stampeders, Nov. 7, 1993

Most kickoff return touchdowns – career

- 3 – Larry Highbaugh
- 2 – Gizmo Williams
- 2 – Kendial Lawrence

Most kickoff return touchdowns – season

- 2 – Kendial Lawrence – 2014

Most missed field goal return touchdowns – career

- 3 – Gizmo Williams
- 1 – Donnie Ashley

Most missed field goal return touchdowns – season

- 1 – Gizmo Williams – 1987
- 1 – Gizmo Williams – 1990
- 1 – Gizmo Williams – 1992
- 1 – Donnie Ashley – 2000

Most interception return touchdowns – career

- 7 – Joe Hollimon
- 6 – Malcolm Frank
- 5 – Cliff Toney
- 5 – Kavis Reed
- 4 – Jason Goss

Most interception return touchdowns – season

- 5 – Malcolm Frank – 2004
- 4 – Joe Hollimon – 1978
- 3 – Ed Jones – 1980

Most interception return touchdowns – game

- 2 – Ed Jones – vs. Hamilton Tiger-Cats, Sept. 7, 1980
- 2 – Jason Goss – vs. Hamilton Tiger-Cats, Sept. 14, 2008
- 2 – Dexter McCoil – vs. Toronto Argonauts, Aug. 23, 2014

Most singles – career

- 218 – Dave Cutler
- 199 – Sean Fleming
- 53 – Jerry Kauric
- 52 – Tom Dixon
- 42 – Grant Shaw

Most singles – season

- 33 – Tom Dixon – 1986
- 23 – Sean Fleming – 1997
- 22 – Sean Fleming – 2007
- 21 – Sean Fleming – 2000
- 20 – Damon Duval – 2011

Most singles - game

- 5 – Dave Cutler – vs. Toronto Argonauts, Oct. 28, 1983
- 4 – Sean Fleming – at Winnipeg Blue Bombers, Oct. 12, 1997
- 4 – Sean Fleming – vs. BC Lions, Oct. 19, 1997
- 4 – Sean Fleming – vs. Saskatchewan Roughriders, Sept. 21, 2002
- 4 – Noel Prefontaine – vs. Calgary Stampeders, July 3, 2008

Most converts – career

- 713 – Sean Fleming
- 627 – Dave Cutler
- 170 – Jerry Kauric
- 166 – Sean Whyte
- 126 – Tom Dixon

Most converts – season

- 70 – Jerry Kauric – 1989
- 64 – Ray Macoritti – 1990
- 63 – Sean Fleming – 2003
- 62 – Dave Cutler – 1992
- 60 – Sean Fleming – 1992

Most converts - game

- 9 – Sean Fleming – vs. Winnipeg Blue Bombers, Sept. 15, 1995
- 8 – Dave Cutler – vs. Montreal Alouettes, Sept. 26, 1981
- 8 – Dave Cutler – vs. Toronto Argonauts, Oct. 24, 1981

== Passing ==
Most passes thrown – career

- 4,827 – Ricky Ray
- 3,195 – Mike Reilly
- 2,333 – Tracy Ham
- 2,251 – Tom Wilkinson
- 2,209 – Warren Moon

Most passes thrown – season

- 715 – Ricky Ray - 2005
- 664 – Warren Moon - 1983
- 654 – Mike Reilly - 2017
- 633 – Mike Reilly - 2016
- 621 – Mike Reilly - 2018

Most passes thrown – game

- 56 – Ricky Ray - vs. Toronto Argonauts, Aug. 20, 2005
- 54 – Trevor Harris - @ Winnipeg Blue Bombers, June 27, 2019
- 53 – Mike Reilly - @ Calgary Stampeders, Sept. 4, 2017
- 51 – Tom Wilkinson - vs. Winnipeg Blue Bombers, July 18, 1977
- 51 – Warren Moon - vs. Montreal Concordes

Most completions – career

- 3,225 – Ricky Ray
- 2,120 – Mike Reilly
- 1,382 – Tom Wilkinson
- 1,280 – Warren Moon
- 1,216 – Tracy Ham

Most completions – season

- 479 – Ricky Ray - 2005
- 448 – Mike Reilly - 2016
- 447 – Mike Reilly - 2017
- 422 – Ricky Ray - 2008
- 418 – Mike Reilly - 2018

Most completions – game

- 40 – Ricky Ray - vs. Toronto Argonauts, Aug. 20, 2005
- 37 – Mike Reilly - @ Calgary Stampeders, Sept. 4, 2017
- 36 – Warren Moon - vs. Hamilton Tiger-Cats, Sept. 11, 1983
- 36 – Ricky Ray - @ Winnipeg Blue Bombers, Sept. 26, 2008

Most consecutive pass completions

- 22 – Jason Maas - vs. Winnipeg Blue Bombers, July 30, 2004
- 17 – Stefan LeFors vs. Saskatchewan Roughriders, Oct. 26, 2007

Most passing yards – career

- 40,531 – Ricky Ray
- 26,929 – Mike Reilly
- 21,228 – Warren Moon
- 19,240 – Tracy Ham
- 18,684 – Tom Wilkinson

Most passing yards – season

- 5,830 – Mike Reilly – 2017
- 5,663 – Ricky Ray – 2008
- 5,648 – Warren Moon – 1983
- 5,562 – Mike Reilly – 2018
- 5,554 – Mike Reilly – 2016

Most passing yards – game

- 555 – Warren Moon – vs. Montreal Concordes, Oct. 15, 1983
- 540 – Jason Maas - vs. Winnipeg Blue Bombers, July 30, 2004
- 522 – Warren Moon - vs. Hamilton Tiger-Cats, Sept. 11, 1983
- 511 – Mike Reilly - @ Toronto Argonauts, Aug. 18, 2013
- 510 – Cody Fajardo - @ Saskatchewan Roughriders, July 24, 2026

Highest pass completion percentage – season (min. 300 attempts)

- 74.71 – Cody Fajardo – 2025
- 70.77 – Mike Reilly – 2016
- 69.89 – Ricky Ray – 2007
- 69.75 – Ricky Ray – 2008
- 69.32 – Cody Fajardo – 2026

Highest pass completion percentage – game (min. 20 attempts)

- 92.00 (23/25) – Ricky Ray – vs. Montreal Alouettes, October 31, 2008
- 90.48 (19/21) – Tom Wilkinson – vs. Ottawa Rough Riders, August 19, 1974
- 90.00 (27/30) – Jason Maas – vs. Winnipeg Blue Bombers, July 30, 2004
- 89.29 (25/28) – Cody Fajardo – at Toronto Argonauts, September 13, 2025
- 87.50 (21/24) – Ricky Ray – vs. Ottawa Renegades, September 19, 2003
- 87.50 (28/32) – Jason Maas – vs. Ottawa Renegades, August 29, 2004

Highest passing efficiency rating – season (min. 300 attempts)

- 108.3 – Warren Moon – 1983
- 108.1 – Ricky Ray – 2003
- 104.7 – Jason Maas – 2004
- 104.6 – Cody Fajardo – 2025
- 104.5 – Mike Reilly – 2016

Most passing touchdowns – career

- 210 – Ricky Ray
- 143 – Mike Reilly
- 142 – Tracy Ham
- 139 – Warren Moon
- 129 – Tom Wilkinson

Most passing touchdowns – season

- 36 – Warren Moon – 1982
- 36 – Tracy Ham – 1990
- 35 – Ricky Ray – 2003
- 31 – Warren Moon – 1983
- 31 – Tracy Ham – 1991
- 31 – Jason Maas – 2004

Most passing touchdowns – game

- 5 – Warren Moon - vs. Montreal Alouettes, Oct. 15, 1983
- 5 – Tracy Ham - vs. Toronto Argonauts, Aug. 21, 1991
- 5 – Dan Crowley - vs. Winnipeg Blue Bombers, July 21, 2000
- 5 – Nealon Greene - @ Toronto Argonauts, Oct. 21, 2000
- 5 – Ricky Ray - vs. Hamilton Tiger-Cats, July 30, 2005
- 5 – Ricky Ray - vs. Winnipeg Blue Bombers, June 28, 2007
- 5 – Ricky Ray - vs. Montreal Alouettes, Sept. 14, 2007

Most interceptions – career

- 130 – Ricky Ray
- 96 – Tom Wilkinson
- 93 – Jackie Parker
- 89 – Tracy Ham
- 82 – Mike Reilly

Most interceptions – season

- 27 – Danny McManus – 1996
- 24 – Tracy Ham – 1990
- 24 – Ricky Ray – 2005
- 22 – Matt Dunigan – 1985
- 20 – Lindy Berry – 1950
- 20 – Lindy Berry – 1950

Most interceptions – game

- 6 – Lindy Berry - vs. Winnipeg Blue Bombers, Sept. 9, 1950
- 6 – Tom Maudlin - vs. Saskatchewan Roughriders, Sept. 7, 1963
- 6 – Charlie Fulton - @ Ottawa Rough Riders, Sept. 27, 1969
- 6 – Tracy Ham - @ Hamilton Tiger-Cats, Aug. 12, 1988
- 6 – Tracy Ham - @ Toronto Argonauts, July 27, 1989

== Rushing ==
Most rushing yards – career

- 9,966 – Johnny Bright
- 8,769 – Norman Kwong
- 6,160 – Jim Thomas
- 5,730 – Jim Germany
- 4,713 – Jackie Parker

Most rushing yards – season

- 1,722 – Johnny Bright – 1958
- 1,679 – Johnny Bright – 1957
- 1,503 – Reggie Taylor – 1989
- 1,455 – Roy Bell – 1973
- 1,448 – John Avery – 2002

Most rushing yards – game

- 225 – Sean Millington – vs. Saskatchewan Roughriders, Oct. 30, 1999
- 204 – Justin Rankin – vs. Calgary Stampeders, September 6, 2025
- 198 – Ron McClendon – at Montreal Alouettes, Oct. 21, 2006
- 192 – Norman Kwong – vs. Calgary Stampeders, Oct. 29, 1955
- 192 – John White – vs. Saskatchewan Roughriders, Sept. 26, 2014

Longest run

- 104 – Jim Thomas – vs. BC Lions, Oct. 9, 1965 (TD)
- 100 – Jim Thomas – at Winnipeg Blue Bombers, Aug. 2, 1966 (TD)
- 97 – Jim Thomas – vs. Ottawa Rough Riders, Sept. 4, 1964 (TD)
- 96 – Jim Germany – at Winnipeg Blue Bombers, July 27, 1977 (TD)

Most rushing yards, quarterback – career

- 4,713 – Jackie Parker
- 4,438 – Tracy Ham
- 3,040 – Mike Reilly
- 2,754 – Damon Allen
- 2,662 – Ricky Ray

Most rushing yards, quarterback – season

- 1,086 – Tracy Ham – 1990
- 1,005 – Tracy Ham – 1989
- 998 – Tracy Ham – 1991
- 920 – Damon Allen – 1993
- 878 – Nealon Greene – 1999

Most rushing yards, quarterback – game

- 180 – Nealon Greene – vs. Saskatchewan Roughriders, July 16, 1999
- 170 – Damon Allen – vs. BC Lions, October 29, 1993
- 166 – Tracy Ham – at Ottawa Rough Riders, August 15, 1991
- 150 – Tracy Ham – at Hamilton Tiger-Cats, September 29, 1989

Most 100-yard games – career

- 36 – Johnny Bright
- 19 – Norman Kwong
- 15 – Jim Thomas

Most 100-yard games – season

- 9 – Johnny Bright - 1957
- 8 – Norman Kwong - 1956
- 8 – Johnny Bright - 1958

Most consecutive 100-yard rushing games season

- 8 – Johnny Bright - 1957
- 4 – Norman Kwong - 1956
- 4 – John Avery - 2002
- 4 – Daniel Porter - 2010

Most 100-yard rushing games, quarterback, season

- 3 – Jackie Parker - 1954
- 3 – Tracy Ham - 1990
- 2 – Matt Dunigan - 1984
- 2 – Tracy Ham - 1991
- 2 – Nealon Greene - 1999
- 2 – Nealon Greene - 2000
- 2 – Nealon Greene - 2002

== Receiving ==
Most receptions – career

- 575 – Brian Kelly
- 545 – Terry Vaughn
- 496 – Fred Stamps
- 485 – Adarius Bowman
- 476 – Ed Hervey

Most receptions – season

- 120 – Adarius Bowman – 2016
- 112 – Adarius Bowman – 2014
- 109 – Derel Walker – 2016
- 106 – Craig Ellis – 1990
- 106 – Terry Vaughn – 2003

Most receptions – season, rookie

- 89 – Derel Walker - 2015
- 75 – Shalon Baker - 1995
- 73 – Kez McCorvey - 2000

Most receptions – game

- 15 – George McGowan – at Saskatchewan Roughriders, Sept. 3, 1973 (249 yards)
- 15 – Darren Flutie – vs. Winnipeg Blue Bombers, Aug. 7, 1997 (231 yards)
- 14 – Fred Stamps – at Hamilton Tiger-Cats, Sept. 16, 2011 (130 yards)
- 14 – Derel Walker – at Hamilton Tiger-Cats, Aug. 21, 2015 (183 yards)

Most receiving yards – career

- 11,169 – Brian Kelly
- 7,932 – Fred Stamps
- 7,681 – Terry Vaughn
- 7,160 – Tom Scott
- 7,050 – Adarius Bowman

Most 1,000-yard seasons - career

- 6 – Brian Kelly - (1979, 1981, 1983-1985, 1987)
- 6 – Terry Vaughn - (1999-2004)
- 5 – Tom Scott - (1978, 1980-1983)
- 5 – Fred Stamps - (2009-2013)

Most consecutive 1000-yard seasons – career

- 6 – Terry Vaughn - (1999-2004)
- 5 – Fred Stamps - (2009-2013)
- 4 – Tom Scott - (1980-1983)
- 4 – Craig Ellis - (1989-1992)

Most receiving yards – season

- 1,812 – Brian Kelly – 1983
- 1,761 – Adarius Bowman – 2016
- 1,687 – Brandon Zylstra – 2017
- 1,665 – Brian Kelly – 1981
- 1,654 – Craig Ellis – 1990

Most receiving yards – season, rookie

- 1,156 – Shalon Baker – 1995
- 1,110 – Derel Walker – 2015
- 1,088 – Brian Kelly – 1979

Most receiving yards – game

- 275 – Terry Vaughn – at Winnipeg Blue Bombers, August 13, 1999
- 266 – Brian Kelly – vs. Montreal Concordes, October 15, 1983
- 249 – George McGowan – at Saskatchewan Roughriders, September 3, 1973
- 245 – Morris Bailey – at Calgary Stampeders, September 2, 1950
- 239 – Brian Kelly – vs. BC Lions, September 16, 1979

Longest reception

- 108 – Vidal Hazelton from Mike Reilly – vs. BC Lions, July 28, 2017
- 105 – Jason Tucker from Ricky Ray – at Winnipeg Blue Bombers, July 6, 2005
- 104 – Derel Walker from Mike Reilly – vs. Calgary Stampeders, September 10, 2016

== Returns ==
=== Punt returns ===
Most punt returns – career

- 1,003 – Gizmo Williams
- 299 – Bayne Norrie
- 278 – Rollie Miles
- 276 – Winston October
- 228 – Dick Dupuis

Most punt returns – season

- 118 – Tony Hunter – 1989
- 100 – Gary Hayes – 1982
- 98 – Gizmo Williams – 1991
- 96 – Gizmo Williams – 1988
- 93 – Leigh McMillan – 1958
- 93 – Kendial Lawrence – 2015

Most punt returns – game

- 12 – Gizmo Williams - @ Hamilton Tiger-Cats, Aug. 12, 1988
- 12 – Tony Hunter - vs. BC Lions, Sept. 24, 1989
- 11 – Leigh McMillan - vs. Saskatchewan Roughriders, Sept. 27, 1958
- 11 – Joe Hollimon - vs. BC Lions, Oct. 11, 1976
- 11 – Gregg Butler - @ Hamilton Tiger-Cats, Sept. 23, 1979
- 11 – Shalon Baker - vs. Hamilton Tiger-Cats, Aug. 23, 1996
- 11 – Winston October - vs. Winnipeg Blue Bombers, Oct. 17, 2003

Most punt return yards – career

- 11,177 – Gizmo Williams
- 2,819 – Winston October
- 2,190 – Larry Highbaugh
- 2,085 – Rollie Miles
- 1,870 – Dick Dupuis

Most punt return yards – season

- 1,440 – Gizmo Williams – 1991
- 1,181 – Tony Hunter – 1989
- 1,124 – Gizmo Williams – 1992
- 1,077 – Gizmo Williams – 1993
- 987 – Gizmo Williams – 1990

Most punt return yards – game

- 232 – Gizmo Williams – vs. Ottawa Rough Riders, July 17, 1991
- 221 – Gizmo Williams – vs. Calgary Stampeders, June 27, 1987
- 208 – Gizmo Williams – vs. Calgary Stampeders, Nov. 7, 1993
- 205 – Gizmo Williams – at Toronto Argonauts, Aug. 9, 1995
- 205 – Tony Tompkins – at Ottawa Renegades, July 21, 2005

Longest punt return

- 116 – Larry Highbaugh – vs. Winnipeg Blue Bombers, Oct. 26, 1975
- 104 – Gizmo Williams – at Hamilton Tiger-Cats, Aug. 12, 1992
- 104 – Gizmo Williams – vs. Calgary Stampeders, Nov. 7, 1993
- 101 – Winston October – vs. Hamilton Tiger-Cats, July 17, 2004

=== Kickoff returns ===
Most kickoff returns – career

- 335 – Gizmo Williams
- 151 – Winston October
- 118 – Larry Highbaugh
- 118 – Joe Hollimon
- 115 – Tony Tompkins

Most kickoff returns – season

- 57 – Tony Tompkins – 2006
- 56 – Tristan Jackson – 2009
- 52 – Gizmo Williams – 1997
- 51 – Stephan Jones – 1987
- 51 – Winston October – 2004

Most kickoff returns – game

- 8 – Joe Hollimon - vs. Calgary Stampeders, Oct. 31, 1976
- 8 – Gizmo Williams - @ Calgary Stampeders, Sept. 5, 1994
- 8 – Eric Blount - @ Calgary Stampeders, Sept. 4, 1995
- 8 – Donnie Ashley - @ Calgary Stampeders, July 22, 1999
- 8 – Jamal Miles - @ BC Lions, Oct. 25, 2013

Most kickoff return yards – career

- 7,354 – Gizmo Williams
- 4,189 – Larry Highbaugh
- 3,173 – Winston October
- 3,171 – Joe Hollimon
- 2,489 – Tony Tompkins

Most kickoff return yards – season

- 1,167 – Tristan Jackson – 2009
- 1,145 – Tony Tompkins – 2006
- 1,105 – Gizmo Williams – 1997
- 1,073 – Winston October – 2004
- 1,018 – Winston October – 2003

Most kickoff return yards – game

- 239 – Joe Hollimon - vs. Calgary Stampeders, October 31, 1976
- 228 – Stephan Jones - vs. Toronto Argonauts, August 1, 1986
- 217 – Tyler Thomas - vs. Calgary Stampeders, September 6, 2014
- 202 – Donnie Ashley – at Calgary Stampeders, July 22, 1999
- 200 – Fred Bailey – vs. Hamilton Tiger-Cats, August 27, 1999

Longest kickoff return

- 118 – Larry Highbaugh - at Winnipeg Blue Bombers, Oct. 17, 1976 (TD)
- 109 – Larry Highbaugh - vs. Winnipeg Blue Bombers, Oct. 26, 1975 (TD)
- 107 – Kendial Lawrence - at Toronto Argonauts, Oct. 4, 2014 (TD)
- 105 – Jim Thomas (6)/Terry Swarn (99) - at Winnipeg Blue Bombers, Sept. 20, 1970 (TD)
- 105 – Stephan Jones - vs. Toronto Argonauts, Aug. 1, 1986 (TD)

=== Fumble returns ===
Most returns – career

- 26 – Willie Pless
- 23 – Rollie Miles
- 21 – Singor Mobley
- 18 – John LaGrone
- 18 – Dan Bass

Most returns – season

- 8 – Willie Pless - 1992
- 6 – Oscar Kruger - 1956
- 6 – John LaGrone – 1969
- 6 – Willie Pless - 1994

Most returns – game

- 3 – Willie Pless - vs. BC Lions, Oct. 16, 1992
- 3 – Willie Pless - at Sacramento Gold Miners, Aug. 19, 1994

Most return yards – career

- 266 – Singor Mobley
- 175 – Pete Lavorato
- 153 – Ron Howard

Most return yards – season

- 129 – Singor Mobley - 1995
- 123 – Pete Lavorato - 1977
- 96 – Tyrone Walls - 1972

Most return yards – game

- 95 – Ron Howard - vs. Toronto Argonauts, Sept. 12, 1987
- 92 – Terry Ray - vs. Toronto Argonauts, Sept. 26, 1999
- 79 – Jermaine Jones - @ Saskatchewan Roughriders, Sept. 29, 2001

Longest return

- 95 – Ron Howard - vs. Toronto Argonauts, Sept. 12, 1987
- 92 – Terry Ray - vs. Toronto Argonauts, Sept. 26, 1999 (TD)

== Interceptions ==
Most interceptions – career

- 66 – Larry Highbaugh
- 52 – John Wydareny
- 46 – Oscar Kruger

Most interceptions – season

- 11 – John Wydareny - 1969
- 11 – John Wydareny - 1970
- 11 – Darryl Hall - 1984
- 10 – Rollie Miles - 1958
- 10 – Larry Highbaugh - 1979
- 10 – Ed Jones - 1980

Most interceptions – game

- 3 - Steve Bendiak - @ Winnipeg Blue Bombers, Aug. 27, 1959
- 3 - Oscar Kruger - vs. BC Lions, Nov. 4, 1959
- 3 - John Wydareny - vs. Winnipeg Blue Bombers, Oct. 27, 1968
- 3 - John Wydareny - vs. Calgary Stampeders, Sept. 6, 1969
- 3 - Dick Dupuis - vs. Saskatchewan Roughriders, July 31, 1970
- 3 - Ed Jones - vs. Hamilton Tiger-Cats, Sept. 7, 1980
- 3 - Laurent DesLauriers - vs. Ottawa Rough Riders, June 30, 1984
- 3 - Danny Bass - @ Winnipeg Blue Bombers, Oct. 18, 1985
- 3 - Enis Jackson - vs. Saskatchewan Roughriders, Aug. 30, 1989
- 3 - Glenn Rogers - @ Hamilton Tiger-Cats, July 28, 1995
- 3 - Jason Goss - vs. Hamilton Tiger-Cats, Sept. 13, 2008

Most return yards – career

- 770 – Larry Highbaugh
- 747 – John Wydareny
- 689 – Joe Hollimon

Most return yards – season

- 300 – Robert Grant – 2003
- 263 – Malcolm Frank – 2004
- 228 – Joe Hollimon – 1978

Most return yards – game

- 144 – Jason Goss – vs. Hamilton Tiger-Cats, Sept. 13, 2008
- 133 – Joe Burnett – at BC Lions, July 20, 2012
- 127 – John Wydareny – at Calgary Stampeders, Oct. 28, 1967

Longest return

- 108 – Joe Burnett – at BC Lions, July 20, 2012 (TD)
- 107 – John Wydareny – at Calgary Stampeders, Oct. 28, 1967 (TD)
- 106 – Kavis Reed – vs. Saskatchewan Roughriders, Aug. 17, 1996 (TD)

== Quarterback sacks ==
Most sacks – career

- 102 – Stewart Hill
- 75 – Bennie Goods
- 74 – Leroy Blugh
- 66 – Malvin Hunter
- 60 – Almondo Sewell

Most sacks – season

- 18.5 – James Parker – 1981
- 18 – Stewart Hill – 1984
- 18 – Stewart Hill – 1987
- 17.5 – James Parker – 1982
- 17 – Stewart Hill – 1986
- 17 – Stewart Hill – 1990

Most sacks – season

- 4 – Malvin Hunter – vs. BC Lions, September 19, 1998

== Tackles ==
=== Defensive tackles ===
(statistics kept since 1987)

Most defensive tackles – career

- 813 – Willie Pless
- 646 – Larry Wruck
- 602 – Singor Mobley
- 528 – J. C. Sherritt
- 465 – Dan Bass

Most defensive tackles – season

- 130 – J. C. Sherritt – 2012
- 117 – Willie Pless – 1998
- 116 – Dan Bass – 1988
- 116 – Willie Pless – 1997
- 113 – Willie Pless – 1994

Most defensive tackles – game

- 13 – Rod Davis - vs. Montreal Alouettes, Sept. 23, 2011
- 13 – T. J. Hill - vs. Montreal Alouettes, Oct. 5, 2013
- 12 – Willie Pless - @ BC Lions, Oct. 12, 1991
- 12 – Willie Pless - @ Saskatchewan Roughriders, July 7, 1995
- 12 – Willie Pless - @ Hamilton Tiger-Cats, July 28, 1995
- 12 – Singor Mobley - vs. Calgary Stampeders, Sept. 6, 1996
- 12 – Willie Pless - @ Montreal Alouettes, Oct. 4, 1998
- 12 – Singor Mobley - vs. Calgary Stampeders, Sept. 8, 2000
- 12 – A. J. Gass - vs. Calgary Stampeders, July 20, 2001
- 12 – Terry Ray - @ Saskatchewan Roughriders, July 19, 2002
- 12 – J. C. Sherritt - vs. Toronto Argonauts, Aug. 27, 2012
- 12 – Larry Dean - vs. Calgary Stampeders, Sept. 7, 2019
- 12 – Nyles Morgan - vs. BC Lions, Sept. 22, 2023

=== Special teams tackles ===
Most special-teams tackles – career

- 163 – Jed Roberts
- 116 – Mike Miller
- 115 – Mathieu Bertrand
- 92 – A. J. Gass
- 84 – Calvin McCarty

Most special-teams tackles – season

- 29 – Deon Lacey - 2014
- 27 – Mike Miller - 2016
- 25 – Bruce Dickson - 1995
- 25 – Corbin Sharun - 2011

=== Tackles for losses ===
Most tackles for losses – career

- 41 – Willie Pless
- 31 – Bennie Goods
- 27 – Leroy Blugh

Most tackles for losses – season

- 10 – Larry Wruck - 1992
- 8 – Terry Ray - 2000
- 8 – Damaso Munoz - 2012
- 8 – J. C. Sherritt - 2012

== Kicking ==
Most field goals – career

- 553 – Sean Fleming
- 464 – Dave Cutler
- 195 – Sean Whyte
- 118 – Jerry Kauric
- 97 – Grant Shaw

Most field goals – season

- 55 – Vincent Blanchard – 2026
- 50 – Dave Cutler – 1977
- 47 – Sean Fleming – 1994
- 47 – Sean Whyte – 2019
- 45 – Jerry Kauric – 1989
- 45 – Sean Fleming – 2001
- 45 – Sean Whyte – 2016

Most field goals – game

- 9 – Vincent Blanchard – vs. Hamilton Tiger-Cats, Sept. 26, 2026
- 7 – Sean Whyte – at Winnipeg Blue Bombers, June 27, 2019
- 7 – Sean Whyte – vs. Winnipeg Blue Bombers, Aug. 23, 2019
- 6 – Dave Cutler – vs. Saskatchewan Roughriders, Oct. 22, 1972
- 6 – Jerry Kauric – vs. BC Lions, July 13, 1989
- 6 – Sean Fleming – at BC Lions, Oct. 29, 1993
- 6 – Sean Fleming – at BC Lions, Oct. 12, 1996
- 6 – Sean Fleming – vs. Montreal Alouettes, July 17, 1997
- 6 – Sean Whyte – vs. BC Lions, Oct. 17, 2015

Highest field goal accuracy – career (minimum 75 attempts)

- 90.3% (195/216) – Sean Whyte (2015–2021)
- 86.7% (91/105) – Vincent Blanchard (2024–2026)
- 80.8% (97/120) – Grant Shaw (2012–2015)
- 77.8% (84/108) – Noel Prefontaine (2008–2010)
- 73.3% (553/754) – Sean Fleming (1992–2007)

Highest field goal accuracy – season (minimum 25 attempts)

- 93.8% (45/48) – Sean Whyte – 2016
- 93.2% (55/59) – Vincent Blanchard – 2026
- 92.3% (24/26) – Sean Whyte – 2015
- 90.0% (36/40) – Sean Whyte – 2018
- 87.5% (28/32) – Sean Whyte – 2021

Longest field goal

- 59 – Dave Cutler – at Saskatchewan Roughriders, Oct. 28, 1970
- 58 – Bill Mitchell – at Calgary Stampeders, Aug. 17, 1964
- 58 – Dave Cutler – at Hamilton Tiger-Cats, Sept. 24, 1973
- 58 – Sean Fleming – at Sacramento Gold Miners, July 31, 1993
- 57 – Noel Prefontaine – vs. Calgary Stampeders, Sept. 10, 2010
- 57 – Vincent Blanchard – at Saskatchewan Roughriders, July 23, 2026

Most consecutive field goals

- 25 – Sean Whyte (September 18, 2016 – July 14, 2017)
- 25 – Sean Whyte (August 9, 2019 – October 26, 2019)
- 22 – Sean Fleming (September 7, 2001 – October 19, 2001)

== Punting ==
Most punts – career

- 1,264 – Sean Fleming
- 755 – Glenn Harper
- 691 – Hank Ilesic
- 550 – Garry Lefebvre
- 465 – Grant Shaw

Most punts – season

- 156 – Glenn Harper – 1996
- 154 – Jerry Kauric – 1988
- 154 – Glenn Harper – 1993
- 146 – Sean Fleming – 1998
- 144 – Tom Dixon – 1986
- 144 – Glenn Harper – 1995

Most punts – game

- 15 – Tom Dixon - @ BC Lions, Sept. 19, 1986
- 15 – Glenn Harper - @ Hamilton Tiger-Cats, Sept. 17, 1993

Most yards – career

- 52,957 – Sean Fleming
- 31,857 – Hank Ilesic
- 31,018 – Glenn Harper
- 21,834 – Garry Lefebvre
- 20,566 – Grant Shaw

Most yards – season

- 6,718 – Jerry Kauric – 1988
- 6,554 – Glenn Harper – 1996
- 6,523 – Tom Dixon – 1986
- 6,434 – Damon Duval – 2011
- 6,385 – Glenn Harper – 1993

Most yards – game

- 721 – Tom Dixon - @ BC Lions, Sept. 19, 1986
- 612 – Glenn Harper - @ Hamilton Tiger-Cats, Sept. 17, 1993

Longest punt

- 91 – Sean Fleming - @ Saskatchewan Roughriders, Sept. 28, 1997
- 88 – Hank Ilesic - @ Calgary Stampeders, Sept. 19, 1981
- 87 – Fred Dunn - @ Calgary Stampeders, Sept. 6, 1971
- 87 – Hank Ilesic - vs. BC Lions, Sept, 17, 1977
- 87 – Hank Ilesic - @ Winnipeg Blue Bombers, July 18, 1978
- 87 – Ray Macoritti - @ Saskatchewan Roughriders, Aug. 19, 1990
- 87 – Jake Julien - @ Calgary Stampeders, Sept. 2, 2026

== Kickoffs ==
Most kickoff yards – career

- 69,973 – Sean Fleming
- 46,134 – Dave Cutler
- 20,303 – Grant Shaw
- 16,456 – Hugh O'Neill
- 13,202 – Noel Prefontaine

Most yards – season

- 5,732 – Sean Fleming – 1992
- 5,640 – Sean Fleming – 2003
- 5,611 – Sean Fleming – 1995
- 5,555 – Noel Prefontaine – 2009
- 5,310 – Grant Shaw – 2016

Most yards – game

- 588 – Sean Fleming – at BC Lions, Oct. 29, 1993
- 582 – Sean Fleming – vs. Toronto Argonauts, August 9, 2003
- 578 – Sean Fleming – vs. Winnipeg Blue Bombers, September 15, 1995
- 570 – Sean Fleming – vs. Ottawa Rough Riders, August 27, 1995
- 562 – Dean Dorsey – at BC Lions, October 12, 1991

Longest kickoff

- 100 – Sergio Castillo – at Hamilton Tiger-Cats, July 1, 2022
- 100 – Dean Faithfull – vs. Winnipeg Blue Bombers, August 10, 2023
- 100 – Boris Bede – vs. Hamilton Tiger-Cats, October 12, 2024
- 100 – Vincent Blanchard – vs. Saskatchewan Roughriders, August 1, 2026
- 100 – Vincent Blanchard – at Calgary Stampeders, September 7, 2026
