= List of Canadian Football League records (Grey Cup) =

This is a list of Canadian Football League Grey Cup records that are effective as of the end of the 2026 CFL season. This list includes both players and teams in the Canadian Football League that have played in Grey Cup championship games.

== Individual records ==
=== Participation ===
Grey Cup championships won:

- 7 – Bill Stevenson, Hank Ilesic
- 6 – Jack Wedley, Joe Krol, Frank Morris, Dave Cutler, Larry Highbaugh, Dave Fennell, Dan Kepley, Hector Pothier, Dale Potter, Tom Towns, Ron Estay

Grey Cup games played in:

- 9 - John Barrow, Tommy Grant, Angelo Mosca, Dave Cutler, Larry Highbaugh, Hank Ilesic

=== Points ===
Most points, career Grey Cups

- 72 – Dave Cutler
- 63 – Paul Osbaldiston
- 61 – Don Sweet
- 55 – Lui Passaglia
- 55 – Mark McLoughlin

Most points, single game

- 23 – Don Sweet (1977)
- 22 – Jim Van Pelt (1958)
- 21 – Paul Osbaldiston (1986)
- 21 – Sean Fleming (1993)
- 21 – Justin Medlock (2019)

=== Touchdowns ===
Most touchdowns, career Grey Cups

- 6 – Damon Allen
- 5 – Hal Patterson
- 5 – Brian Kelly
- 4 – Many players, 10 times

Most touchdowns, single game

- 4 – Art Wilson (1913)
- 3 – Red Storey (1938)
- 3 – Jackie Parker (1956)
- 3 – Tom Scott (1980)

Most rushing touchdowns, career Grey Cups

- 6 – Damon Allen
- 4 – Norman Kwong
- 4 – Johnny Bright
- 4 – Jim Germany
- 4 – Avon Cobourne
- 4 – Dakota Prukop

Most rushing touchdowns, single game

- 3 – Art Wilson (1913)
- 3 – Red Storey (1938)

Most receiving touchdowns, career Grey Cups

- 5 – Brian Kelly
- 4 – Hal Patterson
- 4 – Tom Scott

Most receiving touchdowns, single game

- 3 – Tom Scott (1980)
- 2 – Many players, 13 times, most recently – Joshua Cephus (2026)

Most interception return touchdowns, single game

- 1 – Ike Sutton (1932)
- 1 – Joe Krol (1945)
- 1 – Greg Battle (1990)
- 1 – Ed Berry (1991)
- 1 – Karl Anthony (1994)
- 1 – Charles Gordon (1994)
- 1 – Adrion Smith (1996)
- 1 – James Johnson (2007)
- 1 – Robert Priester (2024)

Most fumble return touchdowns, single game

- 1 – Jackie Parker (1954)
- 1 – Ray Bawel (1957)
- 1 – Ralph Goldston (1958)
- 1 – Norm Rauhaus (1958)
- 1 – Kaye Vaughan (1960)
- 1 – Bill Munsey (1964)
- 1 – Billy Ray Locklin (1967)
- 1 – Roger Scales (1971)
- 1 – Stan Mikawos (1984)
- 1 – James Rockford (1986)
- 1 – Doug Landry (1987)
- 1 – Alvin Walton (1995)
- 1 – Willie Fells (2001)
- 1 – Cassius Vaughn (2017)

Most kickoff return touchdowns, single game

- 1 – Raghib Ismail (1991)
- 1 – Henry Williams (1996)
- 1 – Adrion Smith (1997)
- 1 – Jeremaine Copeland (2002)
- 1 – Tony Tompkins (2005)

Most punt return touchdowns, single game

- 1 – Fritz Hanson (1935)
- 1 – Chris Wright (1995)
- 1 – Jimmy Cunningham (1996)
- 1 – Bill Hatanaka (1976)
- 1 – Terry Williams (2018)
- 1 – Janarion Grant (2022)

Most missed field goal return touchdowns, single game

- 1 – Henry Williams (1996)

=== Passing ===
Most passing yards, career Grey Cups

- 2,470 – Anthony Calvillo
- 1,512 – Ricky Ray
- 1,431 – Bo Levi Mitchell
- 1,420 – Doug Flutie
- 1,373 – Zach Collaros
- 1,357 – Danny McManus
- 1,304 – Bernie Faloney
- 1,281 – Henry Burris
- 1,224 – Sam Etcheverry
- 1,154 – Damon Allen

Most passing yards, single game

- 508 – Sam Etcheverry (1955)
- 480 – Doug Flutie (1992)
- 474 – Kent Austin (1989)
- 461 – Henry Burris (2016)
- 413 – Danny McManus (1996)

Most pass attempts, career Grey Cups

- 298 – Anthony Calvillo
- 185 – Ricky Ray
- 170 – Doug Flutie
- 165 – Bo Levi Mitchell
- 164 – Zach Collaros

Most pass attempts, single game

- 58 – Danny Barrett (1991)
- 49 – Doug Flutie (1992)
- 48 – Jack Jacobs (1953)
- 48 – Doug Flutie (1995)
- 47 – Roy Dewalt (1983)
- 47 – Ricky Ray (2002)

Most pass completions, career Grey Cups

- 179 – Anthony Calvillo
- 118 – Ricky Ray
- 116 – Bo Levi Mitchell
- 111 – Zach Collaros
- 108 – Doug Flutie

Most pass completions, single game

- 35 – Ricky Ray (2005)
- 35 – Henry Burris (2016)
- 34 – Danny Barrett (1991)
- 33 – Doug Flutie (1992)
- 33 – Bo Levi Mitchell (2017)

Highest pass completion percentage, career Grey Cups (minimum 50 attempts)

- 70.3 – Bo Levi Mitchell
- 67.7 – Henry Burris
- 67.6 – Zach Collaros
- 66.2 – Trevor Harris
- 63.8 – Ricky Ray

Highest pass completion percentage, single game (minimum 20 attempts)

- 85.2 – Trevor Harris (2025)
- 82.6 – Zach Collaros (2023)
- 80.8 – Cody Fajardo (2023)
- 80.0 – Jeremiah Masoli (2021)
- 78.9 – Doug Flutie (1997)

Most consecutive completions, single game

- 12 – Doug Flutie (1997)
- 11 – Henry Burris (2008)
- 11 – Cody Fajardo (2023)
- 11 – Cody Fajardo (2026)
- 10 – Doug Flutie (1997)

Most consecutive pass attempts without an interception, career Grey Cups

- 110 – Ricky Ray
- 87 – Anthony Calvillo
- 84 – Doug Flutie

Most touchdown passes, career Grey Cups

- 9 – Anthony Calvillo
- 9 – Ricky Ray
- 8 – Bernie Faloney
- 8 – Russ Jackson
- 8 – Danny McManus

Most touchdown passes, single game

- 4 – Russ Jackson (1969)
- 3 – Many players, 12 times, most recently – Cody Fajardo (2023)

Most interceptions thrown, career Grey Cups

- 8 – Sam Etcheverry
- 8 – Zach Collaros
- 7 – Bo Levi Mitchell
- 6 – Ron Lancaster

Most interceptions thrown, single game

- 4 – Sam Etcheverry (1956)
- 4 – Bruce Lemmerman (1977)
- 4 – Zach Collaros (2024)

Highest passer rating, career Grey Cups (minimum 40 attempts)

- 126.1 – Cody Fajardo
- 118.4 – Russ Jackson
- 105.4 – Roy Dewalt
- 101.0 – Ricky Ray
- 100.7 – Damon Allen

=== Receiving ===
Most receiving yards, career Grey Cups

- 658 – Ben Cahoon
- 575 – Hal Patterson
- 465 – John Patterson
- 402 – Tom Scott
- 394 – Brian Kelly
- 364 – Allen Pitts
- 361 – Ernie Pitts
- 360 – Andy Fantuz
- 345 – Jamel Richardson
- 318 – Rick House

Most receiving yards, single game

- 290 – Red O'Quinn (1954)
- 175 – DeVier Posey (2017)
- 174 – Whit Tucker (1966)
- 174 – Tom Scott (1980)
- 165 – James Murphy (1988)

Most receptions, career Grey Cups

- 46 – Ben Cahoon
- 29 – Hal Patterson
- 28 – DaVaris Daniels
- 26 – Tom Scott
- 26 – Andy Fantuz

Most receptions, single game

- 12 – Red O'Quinn (1954)
- 12 – Tom Scott (1980)
- 11 – Ben Cahoon (2006)
- 11 – Nik Lewis (2008)
- 11 – DaVaris Daniels (2017)

Longest reception, single game

- 100 – DeVier Posey (2017)
- 99 – Pat Woodcock (2002)
- 90 – Red O'Quinn (1954)
- 90 – Paul Dekker (1961)
- 85 – Whit Tucker (1966)

=== Rushing ===
Most rushing yards, career Grey Cups

- 391 – Mike Pringle
- 356 – Leo Lewis
- 346 – George Reed
- 334 – Andrew Harris
- 332 – Normie Kwong
- 312 – Robert Drummond
- 285 – Brady Oliveira
- 275 – Jackie Parker
- 263 – Jim Germany
- 261 – Johnny Bright

Most rushing yards, single game

- 197 – Kory Sheets (2013)
- 169 – Johnny Bright (1956)
- 159 – Antonio Warren (2004)
- 147 – David Green (1979)
- 145 – Normie Kwong (1955)

Most carries, career Grey Cups

- 77 – George Reed
- 76 – Normie Kwong
- 76 – Mike Pringle
- 74 – Leo Lewis
- 68 – Jim Germany

Most carries, single game

- 30 – Normie Kwong (1955)
- 28 – Johnny Bright (1956)
- 23 – George Reed (1966)
- 23 – Anthony Cherry (1988)

Longest rush, single game

- 80 – Vic Washington (1968)
- 74 – Garney Henley (1962)
- 61 – Ken Hobart (1985)
- 58 – Johnny Counts (1964)
- 52 – Gerry Organ (1976)
- 52 – Anthony Cherry (1988)

=== Interceptions ===
Most interceptions, career Grey Cups

- 4 – Joe Hollimon
- 3 – Bruce Coulter
- 3 – Garney Henley
- 3 – Vernon Perry
- 3 – Larry Highbaugh
- 3 – Mike McLeod
- 3 – James Johnson

Most interceptions, single game

- 3 – James Johnson (2007)
- 2 – Many players, 12 times, most recently – Kameron Kelly (2021)

=== Tackles ===
Most defensive tackles, career Grey Cups

- 48 – John Barrow
- 42 – Dan Kepley
- 34 – Juan Sheridan
- 32 – Dale Potter
- 30 – Dale Scott

Most defensive tackles, single game

- 16 – Juan Sheridan (1955)
- 13 – Jackie Parker (1955)
- 12 – Vince Scott (1957)
- 11 – Tom Brown (1964)
- 11 – Cleveland Vann (1976)
- 11 – Reynauld Williams (2009)
- 11 – Jameer Thurman (2025)

Most special teams tackles, career Grey Cups

- 12 – Frank Rigney
- 11 – Bill Graham
- 11 – Tom Towns
- 10 – Geno Denobile
- 10 – Ron Latourelle
- 10 – Ernie Pitts

Most special teams tackles, single game

- 7 – Bill Graham (1957)
- 6 – Steve Hmiel (1963)
- 6 – Bill Lasseter (1964)
- 6 – Tom Pullen (1968)
- 5 – Many players, 12 times, most recently – Llevi Noel (2017)

=== Sacks ===
Most sacks, career Grey Cups

- 9 – Dave Fennell
- 7 – John Barrow
- 7 – James Parker
- 6 – Grover Covington
- 6 – Willie Jefferson

Most sacks, single game

- 5 – Grover Covington (1986)
- 4 – Tyrone Jones (1984)
- 3 – Dave Fennell (1982)
- 3 – James Parker (1985)
- 3 – Rick Klassen (1983)
- 3 – Junior Ah You (1977)
- 3 – Willie Jefferson (2019)

=== Punting ===
Longest punt, single game

- 87 – Alan Ford (1967)
- 85 – Garry Lefebvre (1973)
- 84 – Lui Passaglia (1988)
- 80 – Josh Miller (1995)
- 78 – Joe Zuger (1964)
- 78 – Ed Ulmer (1965)
- 78 – Terry Baker (2002)

Highest punting average, single game (minimum five punts)

- 54.8 – John Haggerty (2024)
- 49.5 – Josh Miller (1995)
- 49.3 – Jesse Mirco (2025)
- 49.2 – John Haggerty (2022)
- 49.1 – Hank Ilesic (1981)

=== Field goals ===
Most field goals, career Grey Cups

- 18 – Dave Cutler
- 17 – Don Sweet
- 16 – Paul Osbaldiston
- 13 – Lui Passaglia
- 13 – Mark McLoughlin

Most field goals, single game

- 6 – Don Sweet (1977)
- 6 – Paul Osbaldiston (1986)
- 6 – Sean Fleming (1993)
- 6 – Paul McCallum (2006)
- 6 – Justin Medlock (2019)

Longest field goal made, single game

- 53 – Carlos Huerta (1995)
- 52 – Dave Cutler (1975)
- 51 – Bob Macoritti (1976)
- 51 – Terry Baker (2000)
- 50 – Lance Chomyc (1987)
- 50 – Sandro DeAngelis (2008)
- 50 – José Maltos Díaz (2026)

=== Punt returns ===
Most punt return yards, career Grey Cups

- 297 – Janarion Grant
- 221 – Ron Latourelle
- 165 – Henry Williams
- 142 – Keith Stokes

Most punt return yards, single game

- 152 – Janarion Grant (2022)
- 118 – Jovon Johnson (2011)
- 116 – Javon Leake (2022)
- 112 – Terry Williams (2018)
- 105 – Darnell Clash (1985)

Longest punt return, single game

- 102 – Janarion Grant (2022)
- 97 – Terry Williams (2018)
- 82 – Chris Wright (1995)
- 80 – Jimmy Cunningham (1996)
- 79 – Bill Hatanaka (1976)

=== Kickoff returns ===
Most kickoff return yards, career Grey Cups

- 341 – Leo Lewis
- 308 – Janarion Grant
- 260 – Larry Taylor
- 218 – Henry Williams

Most kickoff return yards, single game

- 208 – Larry Taylor (2012)
- 183 – Raghib Ismail (1991)
- 169 – Tim McCray (1989)
- 162 – Brandon Banks (2013)
- 155 – Leo Lewis (1962)

Longest kickoff return, single game

- 96 – Tony Tompkins (2005)
- 95 – Adrion Smith (1997)
- 91 – Henry Williams (1996)
- 87 – Raghib Ismail (1991)
- 78 – Alan Ford (1969)
- 78 – Montrell Washington (2026)

== Team records ==
Most games played, Grey Cup

- 29 – Winnipeg Blue Bombers/'Pegs
- 26 – Edmonton Elks/Eskimos
- 25 – Toronto Argonauts
- 22 – Hamilton Tiger-Cats
- 20 – Regina/Saskatchewan Roughriders
- 21 – Montreal Alouettes

Most consecutive appearances, Grey Cup

- 6 – Edmonton Eskimos (1977–1982)
- 5 – Regina Roughriders (1928–1932)
- 5 – Hamilton Tiger-Cats (1961–1965)
- 5 – Winnipeg Blue Bombers (2019–2024)

Most wins, Grey Cup

- 19 – Toronto Argonauts
- 15 – Edmonton Elks/Eskimos
- 12 – Winnipeg Blue Bombers/'Pegs
- 10 – Ottawa Redblacks/Rough Riders

Most consecutive wins, Grey Cup

- 5 – Edmonton Eskimos (1978–1982)
- 3 – University of Toronto (1909–1911)
- 3 – Queen's University (1922–1924)
- 3 – Toronto Argonauts (1945–1947)
- 3 – Edmonton Eskimos (1954–1956)

Most losses, Grey Cup

- 17 – Winnipeg Blue Bombers/'Pegs
- 15 – Regina/Saskatchewan Roughriders
- 14 – Hamilton Tiger-Cats
- 13 – Montreal Alouettes
