= Blake Dermott =

Canadian football player (born 1961)

Profile
- Positions: Centre, OT

Personal information
- Born: September 10, 1961 (age 65); Edmonton, Alberta, Canada
- Listed height: 6 ft 3 in (1.91 m)
- Listed weight: 275 lb (125 kg)

Career information
- High school: Bonnie Doon
- University: Alberta

Career history
- 1983–1996: Edmonton Elks

Awards and highlights
- 2× Grey Cup champion (1987, 1993); 2× CFL West All-Star (1994 1989); University of Alberta Sports Wall of Fame

Blake Dermott (born September 10, 1961) is a Canadian former professional football offensive lineman who played fourteen seasons in the Canadian Football League (CFL) for the Edmonton Elks, and was named the team's Top Lineman in 1988 and 1990 and CFL All-Star in 1989 and 1994. Dermott played in five Grey Cups and was a part of two Grey Cup championship teams in 1987 and 1993. Blake currently sits in 5th place all–time for most games played for the Elks, and was the only player in Elks history to start a game in every position on the Offensive Line.

Dermott played CIS football for the Alberta Golden Bears and won a gold medal at the 1982 CIS Wrestling Championships for the University of Alberta. Dermott was inducted into the University of Alberta Sports Wall of Fame in 2012.

Dermott is currently the "In–Game Analyst" on Edmonton Elks broadcasts for 630 CHED radio.
