= Hugh Campbell =

American gridiron football player, coach, and administrator (born 1941)

No. 21, 72, 31
- Position: Wide receiver

Personal information
- Born: May 21, 1941 (age 85); San Jose, California, U.S.
- Listed height: 6 ft 0 in (1.83 m)
- Listed weight: 185 lb (84 kg)

Career information
- High school: Los Gatos (Los Gatos, California)
- College: Washington State (1959-1962)
- NFL draft: 1963: 4th round, 50th overall pick
- AFL draft: 1963: 22nd round, 169th overall pick

Career history

Playing
- Saskatchewan Roughriders (1963–1969)

Coaching
- Whitworth College (1970-1976) Head coach; Edmonton Eskimos (1977–1982) Head coach; Los Angeles Express (1983) Head coach; Houston Oilers (1984–1985) Head coach

Operations
- Edmonton Eskimos (1986–1997) General manager; Edmonton Eskimos (1998–2006) President / chief executive officer

Awards and highlights
- As player: Grey Cup champion (1966); Dave Dryburgh Memorial Trophy (1966); 2× CFL All-Star (1965, 1966); 4× CFL Western All-Star (1964-1966, 1969); Voit Trophy (1961); Second-team All-American (1962); Third-team All-American (1961); 3× First-team All-PCC (1960, 1961, 1962); As coach: 5× Grey Cup champion (1978–1982); Annis Stukus Trophy (1979); As administrator: 4× Grey Cup champion (1987, 1993, 2003, 2005)

Head coaching record
- Career: NAIA: 34–30–0 (.531); USFL: 8–10–0 (.444); NFL: 8–22–0 (.267); CFL: 70–21–5 (.755)
- Coaching profile at Pro Football Reference
- Canadian Football Hall of Fame

Hugh Thomas Campbell (born May 21, 1941) is an American former professional football player, coach, and executive. He served as a head coach in three different football leagues: the Canadian Football League (CFL), United States Football League (USFL) and National Football League (NFL). He won the Grey Cup five times as a head coach, tied for the most in CFL history and he is the only one to have won five for one team. Campbell retired as the CEO of the Edmonton Eskimos of the CFL in 2006. He was inducted into the Canadian Football Hall of Fame in 2000.

== College career ==
Campbell played wide receiver at Washington State University from 1959 to 1962. During that time he appeared in the Hula Bowl, the College All-Star game, the Coaches All-America game, and the East-West Shrine Bowl. Campbell received most outstanding player honours in the Coaches and the Shrine Bowl games. He was also awarded the 1961 W. J. Voit Memorial Trophy as the outstanding football player on the Pacific Coast. During his Cougar career he was teamed with fellow CFL Hall of Famer George Reed.

== Professional playing career ==
Campbell joined the Saskatchewan Roughriders in 1963 and "Gluey Hughy", as he became known, was a key element of their Grey Cup winning team in 1966. Campbell quit the Roughriders in 1968 to take a position as assistant coach at Washington State but returned for a final year with the Roughriders in 1969. In his six CFL seasons, Campbell caught 321 passes for an average gain of 16.9 yards per reception and scored 60 touchdowns, including 17 touchdown receptions in 1966. Campbell received western conference all-star honours as a flanker in 1964, 1965, 1966 and 1969. He was a CFL all-star in 1965 and 1966.

== Coaching and administrative career ==
Campbell retired as an active player after the 1969 season to take up a head coaching job with Whitworth College in Spokane, Washington. During his seven-year tenure, Campbell revived the moribund Pirates football program and was named conference coach of the year three times.

In 1977, Campbell was named head coach of the Edmonton Eskimos, where he took the Eskimos to the Grey Cup game in Montreal that first year but lost 41–6 in a major blowout on an icy field against the Montreal Alouettes. It was the last Grey Cup championship game coach Campbell would lose, as the Eskimos won the next five Grey Cup games, from 1978 through 1982, an all-time CFL consecutive championships record.

Following the 1982 season, Campbell left the CFL to become head coach of the USFL's Los Angeles Express.

After one season, the Houston Oilers, who were bidding for the services of Warren Moon, hired him to become their head coach and help improve their chances of signing the coveted free agent (the Oilers ultimately signed Moon). He was head coach of the Oilers for the 1984 and 1985 seasons, being fired by the Oilers with two games left to go in the 1985 season.

In 1986, he returned to the Eskimos as the team's general manager.

After 20 years as the head of the Eskimos organization, Campbell announced his retirement effective at the end of 2006.

== Personal life ==
Campbell and his wife Louise have four children, daughters Molly, Jill and Robin and son, Rick, who is the former head coach of the BC Lions.

== Head coaching record ==
Year	Team	Overall	Conference	Standing	Bowl/playoffs
Whitworth Pirates (Evergreen Conference) (1970–1976)
1970	Whitworth	2–7	2–3	T–5th	
Whitworth Pirates (Northwest Conference) (1971–1976)
1971	Whitworth	2–7	NA	NA	
1972	Whitworth	7–2	NA	NA	
1973	Whitworth	4–5	4–2	3rd	
1974	Whitworth	6–3	4–3	T–2nd	
1975	Whitworth	7–3	6–1	T–1st	
1976	Whitworth	6–3	4–3	5th	
Whitworth:		34–30	20–12		
Total:		34–30			
National championship Conference title Conference division title or championship game berth

=== CFL, USFL, and NFL ===
Team	Year	Regular season					Postseason		
Team	Year	Won	Lost	Ties	Win %	Finish	Won	Lost	Result
EDM	1977	10	6	0	.625	1st in West Division	1	1	Lost to Montreal Alouettes in 65th Grey Cup
EDM	1978	10	4	2	.688	1st in West Division	2	0	66th Grey Cup champions
EDM	1979	12	2	2	.813	1st in West Division	2	0	67th Grey Cup champions
EDM	1980	13	3	0	.813	1st in West Division	2	0	68th Grey Cup champions
EDM	1981	14	1	1	.906	1st in West Division	2	0	69th Grey Cup champions
EDM	1982	11	5	0	.688	1st in West Division	2	0	70th Grey Cup champions
EDM total		70	21	5	.755	6 West Division; Championships	11	1	5 Grey Cups
LA	1983	8	10	0	.444	2nd in Pacific Division	-	-	did not qualify
LA total		8	10	0	.444	0 Division; Championships	0	0	0 USFL Champs
HOU	1984	3	13	0	.188	4th in AFC Central	—	—	did not qualify
HOU	1985	5	9	0	.357	4th in AFC Central	—	—	N/A (fired)
HOU total		8	22	0	.267	0 Division; Championships	0	0	0 Super Bowls
Total		86	53	5	.615	6 Division; Championships	11	1	5 Grey Cups
