= Hmiel =

Hmiel is a surname. Notable people with the surname include:

- Shane Hmiel (born 1980), American racing driver
- Steve Hmiel (born c. 1938), Canadian football player
