= Larry Wruck =

No. 47
- Position: Linebacker

Personal information
- Born: October 29, 1962 (age 64); Saskatoon, Saskatchewan, Canada
- Listed height: 6 ft 0 in (1.83 m)
- Listed weight: 220 lb (100 kg)

Career information
- High school: Evan Hardy Collegiate
- CJFL: Saskatoon Hilltops

Career history
- 1985–1996: Edmonton Eskimos

Awards and highlights
- 2× Grey Cup champion (1987, 1993); 2× Dr. Beattie Martin Trophy (1994, 1995); Eskimos record: Most tackles for losses – season (10) - 1992

Larry Wruck (born October 29, 1962) is a Canadian professional former linebacker who played twelve seasons for the Edmonton Eskimos of the Canadian Football League winning two Grey Cups.

Wruck began playing Canadian football with the Saskatoon Tinklers in the Kinsmen Tackle League in 1975 and won championships all four years at Evan Hardy Collegiate, winning the Saskatoon junior championship in 1976 and the Saskatchewan high school championship in 1977, 1978, and 1979.

He joined the Saskatoon Hilltops in 1980, winning the rookie of the year award in 1980, leading the Prairie Junior Football Conference in tackles in both 1981 and 1982, and, in 1982, was named an all-star, won the outstanding linebacker award in the conference, and the Canadian Junior Football League's Outstanding Defensive Player of the Year trophy. In 2007, the CJFL's Outstanding Defensive Player of the Year trophy was renamed the Larry Wruck Award in his honour.

Wruck spent two seasons in the Saskatchewan Roughriders' training camps before being traded to the Edmonton Eskimos at the start of the 1985 CFL season. Between 1985 and 1996 Wruck played 213 games and recorded a total of 667 tackles, 32 sacks, 15 interceptions, and 19 fumble recoveries.

He appeared in five Grey Cup games, winning in 1987 and 1993. Wruck was named a West Division All-Star in 1989, was named the Eskimos' most outstanding Canadian player five times, and was runner-up for the CFL's Most Outstanding Canadian Award in the 1994 and 1995 seasons.
