= Cliff Toney =

American football player (born 1958)

No. 6
- Position: Defensive back

Personal information
- Born: December 17, 1958 (age 67); Huntsville, Alabama, U.S.
- Listed height: 6 ft 0 in (1.83 m)
- Listed weight: 185 lb (84 kg)

Career information
- College: Auburn
- NFL draft: 1981: 8th round, 219th overall pick

Career history
- 1981: Atlanta Falcons*
- 1984–1988: Edmonton Eskimos
- * Offseason or practice squad member only

Awards and highlights
- Grey Cup champion (1987); 2× Second-team All-SEC (1978, 1980)

Clifford Toney (born December 17, 1958) is an American former professional football defensive back who played five seasons with the Edmonton Eskimos of the Canadian Football League (CFL). He was selected by the Atlanta Falcons in the eighth round of the 1981 NFL draft after playing college football at Auburn University.

== Early life and college ==
Clifford Toney was born on December 17, 1958, in Huntsville, Alabama. He lettered for the Auburn Tigers from 1977 to 1980. He finished third in the Southeastern Conference (SEC) with five interceptions in 1978, earning Associated Press (AP) second-team All-SEC honors. He made one interception in 1979. In 1980, Toney finished third in the SEC with five interceptions for the second time, garnering AP second-team All-SEC recognition.

== Professional career ==
Toney was selected by the Atlanta Falcons in the eighth round with the 219th overall pick of the 1981 NFL draft. He was released later in 1981.

Toney played in 14 games for the Edmonton Eskimos of the Canadian Football League in 1984, recording one interception for an 88-yard touchdown and one sack. He appeared in 14 games again in 1985 and made one interception for a 56-yard touchdown. Toney played in 11 games during the 1986 season, totaling five interceptions for 35 yards and a touchdown and one sack. He appeared in 10 games in 1987, accumulating 33 tackles and one interception for two yards. The Eskimos won the 75th Grey Cup against the Toronto Argonauts on November 29, 1987. He played in 15 games during his final season in 1988, recording 44 tackles and four interceptions for 160 yards and two touchdowns.
