= Tom Dixon (Canadian football) =

Canadian football player (born 1960)

Profile
- Position: Kicker

Personal information
- Born: January 13, 1960 (age 66); Vancouver, British Columbia, Canada

Career information
- College: UBC

Career history
- 1985–87: Edmonton Eskimos
- 1987–88: Ottawa Rough Riders

Awards and highlights
- Grey Cup champion (1987); Dave Dryburgh Memorial Trophy (1986); 2× CFL West All-Star (1985, 1986)

Tom Dixon (born January 13, 1960) is a former all-star and award winning kicker in the Canadian Football League (CFL).

A graduate of UBC, Dixon played four seasons in the CFL. During his first two, with the Edmonton Eskimos, he was named an all-star and won the Dave Dryburgh Memorial Trophy in 1986 for points scored. He finished his career the Ottawa Rough Riders, having score 510 points.
