= Glenn Harper =

Canadian gridiron football plaeyr (born 1962)

No. 18
- Position: Punter/Holder

Personal information
- Born: September 12, 1962 (age 64); Rural Municipality of Fort Garry, an area within Winnipeg, Manitoba, Canada)
- Listed height: 6 ft 0 in (1.83 m)
- Listed weight: 173 lb (78 kg)

Career information
- College: Washington State
- CFL draft: 1986: 5th round, 43rd overall pick

Career history
- 1986–1988: Calgary Stampeders
- 1989–1990: Toronto Argonauts
- 1991–1996: Edmonton Eskimos
- 2002–2003: Ottawa Renegades

Awards and highlights
- Grey Cup champion (1993); 2× CFL West All-Star (1987, 1993)

Glenn Harper (born September 12, 1962, in R.M. of Fort Garry, an area in Winnipeg, Manitoba), a former punter from 1986 to 1996 and from 2002 to 2003 for four Canadian Football League (CFL) teams.
