= List of Canadian Football League records =

Canadian Football League records include:

Regular Season:

- List of Canadian Football League records (individual)
- List of Canadian Football League records (team)
- List of Canadian Football League records (Playoffs)
- List of Canadian Football League records (Grey Cup)
