= Gizmo Williams =

American gridiron football player (born 1962)

No. 2
- Positions: Wide receiver, Punt returner, Kick returner

Personal information
- Born: May 31, 1962 (age 64); Memphis, Tennessee, U.S.
- Listed height: 5 ft 6 in (1.68 m)
- Listed weight: 185 lb (84 kg)

Career information
- College: East Carolina

Career history
- 1985: Memphis Showboats
- 1986: Calgary Stampeders*
- 1986–1988: Edmonton Eskimos
- 1989: Philadelphia Eagles
- 1990–2000: Edmonton Eskimos
- * Offseason or practice squad member only

Awards and highlights
- 2× Grey Cup champion (1987, 1993); 5× CFL All-Star (1987, 1991–1994); 7× CFL West All-Star (1987, 1988, 1991–1994, 1997); Edmonton Eskimos Wall of Honour (2002); CFL records: Most kickoff returns – career (335); Most kickoff return yards – career (7,354); Most kickoff returns – game (8) - September 5, 1994; Most punt returns – career (1,003); Most punt returns – game (12) - August 12, 1988; Most punt return yards – career (11,177); Most punt return yards – season (1,440) - 1991; Most punt return yards – game (232) - July 17, 1991; Most punt return touchdowns – career (26); Most punt return touchdowns – season (5); Most punt return touchdowns – game (2) - 3 times; Most all purpose yards in pro football history (23,927)
- Stats at Pro Football Reference
- Canadian Football Hall of Fame (Class of 2006)

Henry Lee "Gizmo" Williams (born May 31, 1962) is an American former professional football kick returner and wide receiver. After his retirement at the end of the 2000 CFL season, Williams worked as a motivational speaker.

Born into an impoverished family, Williams was raised by his brother Edgar after the death of both his parents as a child, and, after Edgar's death, by an aunt. Despite his background, Williams was able to be a successful high school football player, and was able to enroll at East Carolina University. After graduating from East Carolina, Williams was signed by the Memphis Showboats of the United States Football League. While playing in Memphis, future Professional Football Hall of Famer Reggie White gave the shifty Williams the nickname "Gizmo", which would stick with him through his professional career.

Williams was released by the Showboats after one season in the USFL in 1985, and signed with the Edmonton Eskimos of the Canadian Football League. With the exception of a half-season with the Philadelphia Eagles in 1989, Williams would play with the Eskimos for every CFL season from 1986 to 2000.

Standing a diminutive 5 feet 6 inches (168 cm), Williams was a prototypical Canadian football kick returner in many ways. He saw some success as a receiver, breaking 900 yards receiving on two occasions, but was best known for his work as a returner. Williams soon developed a trademark of doing a flip in the air after every score, which quickly became associated with Williams in the eyes of the fans. During his career with the Eskimos, Williams set more than 20 CFL records, and as of 2006 is still the league's all-time leader in both punt and kickoff return yardage, and holds the record for most kick return touchdowns with 31 (26 on punt returns, two on kickoff returns and three on missed field goal returns). Perhaps his most memorable was a 115-yard missed-field-goal return for a touchdown in the 1987 Grey Cup.

In 2002, Williams's #2 was put on the Edmonton Eskimos Wall of Honour. Four years later, Williams was inducted into the Canadian Football Hall of Fame with a class that included former teammate and quarterback Matt Dunigan. In November 2006 he was voted one of the CFL's Top 50 players (#25) of the league's modern era by Canadian sports network The Sports Network/TSN.

Williams has a family history of multiple sclerosis, which killed his mother in December 1969 when Williams was six, as well as seven of his ten siblings. Williams's father died in a house fire at Christmas of 1970.

As of 2017, he is a coach for the Jasper Place High School football senior team.

== See also ==
- List of NCAA major college yearly punt and kickoff return leaders
