= Dick Dupuis =

Canadian gridiron football player (born 1942)

No. 17
- Position: Defensive back

Personal information
- Born: September 2, 1942 (age 84); Windsor, Ontario, Canada
- Listed height: 5 ft 10 in (1.78 m)
- Listed weight: 183 lb (83 kg)

Career information
- College: Notre Dame

Career history
- 1965–1967: Calgary Stampeders
- 1968–1976: Edmonton Eskimos

Awards and highlights
- Grey Cup champion (1975); Dr. Beattie Martin Trophy (1971); CFL All-Star (1971); 2× CFL West All-Star (1971, 1972)

Career CFL statistics
- Interceptions: 38 (TDs: 0; Lg: 65)
- Fumble recoveries: 12 (TDs: 1)
- Kickoff returns: 2 (Avg: 17.0; TDs: 0; Lg: 18)
- Punt returns: 405 (Avg: 7.4; TDs: 0; Lg: 32)
- Fumbles: 6

Richard Dupuis (born September 2, 1942) is a Canadian former professional football player in the Canadian Football League (CFL).

Dupuis played college football at the University of Notre Dame.

He played defensive back for the Calgary Stampeders for three years before joining Edmonton and playing 9 years for the Edmonton Eskimos from 1965 to 1976. He won two West All-Star selections at defensive back while with Edmonton (1971 and 1972) and one CFL All-Star in 1971.
