= Tony Tompkins =

Canadian football player

No. 14
- Positions: Wide receiver, Kick returner

Personal information
- Born: November 21, 1982 (age 43); Port Arthur, Texas, U.S.
- Listed height: 5 ft 9 in (1.75 m)
- Listed weight: 170 lb (77 kg)

Career information
- College: Stephen F. Austin

Career history
- 2005–2007: Edmonton Eskimos
- 2008: Montreal Alouettes*
- * Offseason or practice squad member only

Awards and highlights
- Grey Cup champion (2005); Eskimos' Most Outstanding Rookie (2005); Eskimos' Most Outstanding Special Teams Player (2005); Eskimos record: Most kickoff returns – season (57) - 2006
- Stats at CFL.ca

Tony Tompkins (born November 21, 1982) is an American former Canadian Football League wide receiver and special teams player.

Standing at only 5'8", Tompkins is just one of many diminutive kick return specialists to have found success in the CFL. After attending Stephen F. Austin University, Tompkins signed with the Edmonton Eskimos as the replacement for former kick returner Winston October. As a rookie in 2005, Tompkins participated in the 93rd Grey Cup in Vancouver, where he set a record for the longest kickoff return in a Grey Cup game by taking the ball 96 yards for a key touchdown, helping the Eskimos take victory.

After the Grey Cup, Tompkins believed that he was entering his option year, and as such that he would have a chance to try to sign with a National Football League team. Tompkins, who did not have an agent when he signed his first contract, in fact signed a two-year contract with a club option, thus requiring him to report to the Eskimos for one more season than he expected. Tompkins's agent Alex Balic attempted to persuade the Eskimos to release Tompkins but they refused. Tompkins and Balic briefly considered legal action, but in the end Tompkins agreed to return to the Eskimos for the 2006 CFL season. Tompkins made $40,000 CAD with the Eskimos in 2006, well below the NFL league minimum and returned 75 punts for 501 yards, 57 kickoffs for 1,145 yards, and ten missed field goal returns for 209 yards, finishing with the Eskimos’ most all-purpose yards with 1,855. In the 2007 CFL season, Tompkins led the Eskimos in punt return yardage, kickoff returns, and missed field goal return yards and finished the year second on the team in all-purpose yards.

In February 2008, Tompkins signed as a free-agent with the Alouettes. He was released by the Alouettes in June 2008.
