= Leigh McMillan (Canadian football) =

Canadian gridiron football player

Profile
- Position: Halfback

Personal information
- Born: 1934 or 1935 (age 90–91); Edmonton, Alberta, Canada
- Listed height: 5 ft 8 in (1.73 m)
- Listed weight: 155 lb (70 kg)

Career information
- University: Alberta

Career history
- 1955–1957: Edmonton Eskimos

Awards and highlights
- Grey Cup champion (1955, 1956)

Leigh McMillan was a Canadian professional football player who played for the Edmonton Eskimos. He won the Grey Cup with the Eskimos in 1955 and 1956. He played junior football for the Edmonton Wildcats. He is a member of the Edmonton Sports Hall of Fame.

McMillan was a gym teacher at Austin O'Brien High School in Edmonton.
