= Jerry Kauric =

Canadian gridiron football player (born 1963)

Jerry Kauric (born June 28, 1963, in Windsor, Ontario) is a former placekicker who played in the National Football League and Canadian Football League in the late 1980s and early 1990s. Kauric played his early days in the Canadian Junior Football League for the Windsor AKO Fratmen. He then played for the Edmonton Eskimos, where he kicked the game-winning field goal for the 1987 Grey Cup during his first season as an Eskimo. He then played in the NFL for the Cleveland Browns in 1990. Afterwards, he played for the Calgary Stampeders, and then he signed with the Detroit Lions, where he was kept for training camp. He was later cut by the Lions after breaking his foot.
