= Grant Shaw =

Canadian gridiron football player (born 1984)

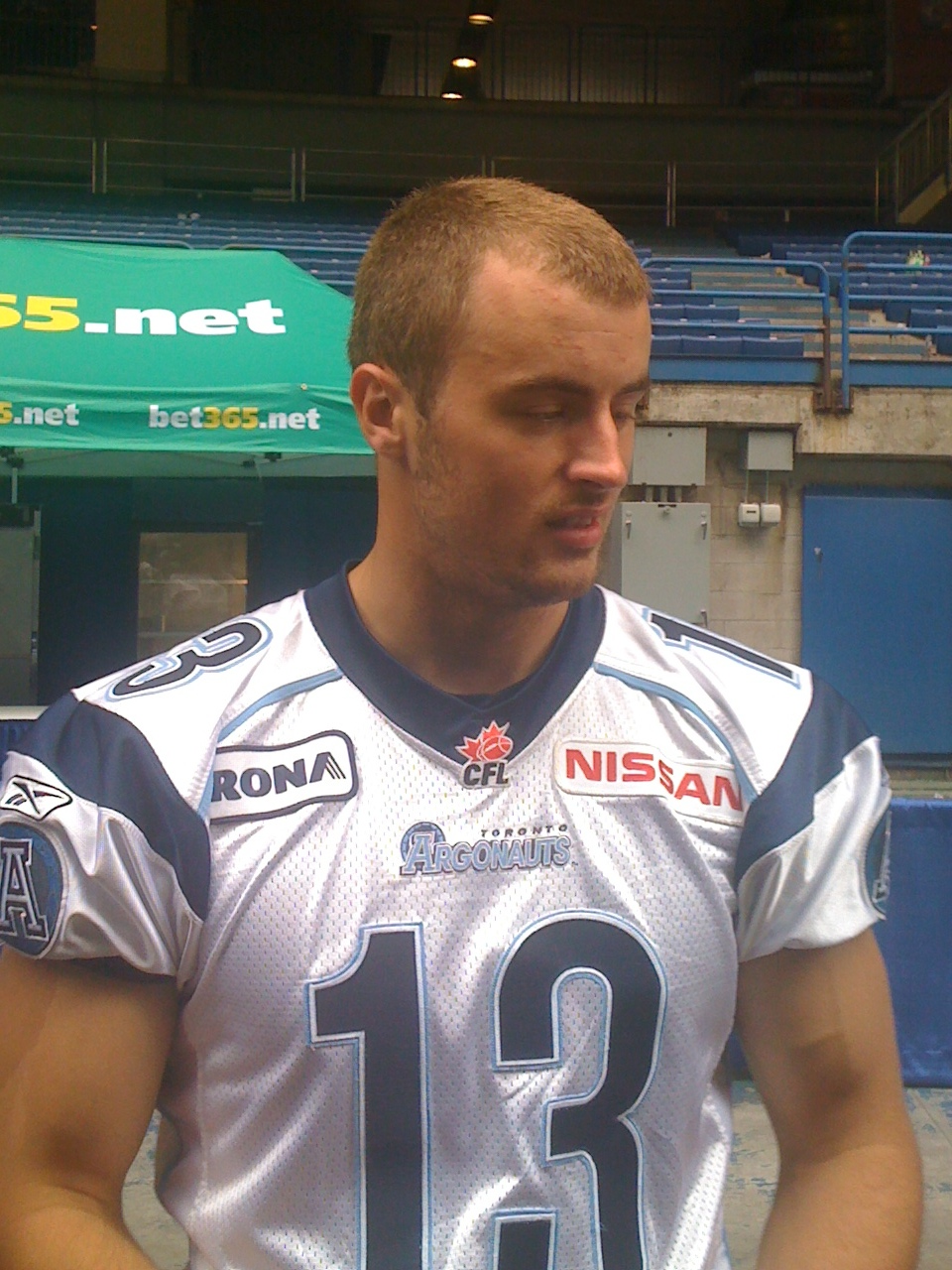
- Shaw with the Toronto Argonauts in 2010

No. 11
- Position: Punter

Personal information
- Born: August 3, 1984 (age 42); Edmonton, Alberta, Canada
- Listed height: 6 ft 3 in (1.91 m)
- Listed weight: 225 lb (102 kg)

Career information
- High school: Jasper Place
- CJFL: Edmonton Huskies
- University: Saskatchewan
- CFL draft: 2010: 2nd round, 11th overall pick

Career history
- 2010–2011: Toronto Argonauts
- 2012–2016: Edmonton Eskimos

Awards and highlights
- Grey Cup champion (2015)
- Stats at CFL.ca

Grant Shaw (born August 3, 1984) is a Canadian former professional football placekicker and punter. He was drafted eleventh overall by the Toronto Argonauts in the 2010 CFL draft and signed with the team on May 22, 2010. He played college football for the Saskatchewan Huskies football team, where he was named a Canada West All-Star for playing defensive back in 2009.

== Professional career ==
Shaw began his rookie season with the Argonauts as the team's starting placekicker before being replaced by Justin Medlock and later Noel Prefontaine due to inaccuracy. Shaw remained on the Argonauts roster for the rest of the season as a backup kicker, punter and linebacker and coverage man on special teams. In the final game of the regular season vs. Montreal, Shaw handled both kicking and punting duties after Noel Prefontaine pulled a muscle during pre-game warm-ups. Shaw hit three of four field goals, including field goals from 47 and 52 yards, and each of the four extra points he attempted, and averaged 49 yards on five punts.

On December 12, 2011, Shaw was traded to the Edmonton Eskimos, along with Steven Jyles and a 2012 first round draft pick, for Ricky Ray.
