= John Wydareny =

Canadian football player

Profile
- Position: Defensive back

Personal information
- Born: February 15, 1941 (age 85); Bradlo, Ontario, Canada
- Listed height: 6 ft 0 in (1.83 m)
- Listed weight: 180 lb (82 kg)

Career information
- University: Western Ontario

Career history
- 1963–1965: Toronto Argonauts
- 1966–1972: Edmonton Eskimos

Awards and highlights
- 2× CFL All-Star (1969, 1970); 3× CFL West All-Star (1967, 1969, 1970); Eskimos records: Most interceptions – season (11) - 1969, 1970

John Wydareny (born February 15, 1941) is a Canadian former professional football player in the Canadian Football League. Wydareny played defensive back for the Toronto Argonauts and the Edmonton Eskimos from 1963 to 1972. Wydareny was an All-Star in the 1969 and 1970 CFL seasons, and was Edmonton's nominee for Most Outstanding Canadian player in 1969. He played college football at the University of Western Ontario.
