= Steve Bendiak =

Canadian football player

Profile
- Positions: End, Halfback

Personal information
- Born: c. 1933; Edmonton, Alberta, Canada
- Died: May 17, 2004 (aged 71); Edmonton, Alberta, Canada
- Listed height: 6 ft 4 in (1.93 m)
- Listed weight: 210 lb (95 kg)

Career history
- 1952–1960: Edmonton Eskimos

Awards and highlights
- Grey Cup champion (1954, 1955, 1956)

Steve Bendiak (c. 1933 – May 17, 2004) was a Canadian professional football player who played for the Edmonton Eskimos. He won the Grey Cup with them in 1954, 1955 and 1956. He is an honoured member of the Alberta Sports Hall of Fame.
