= 68th Grey Cup =

1980 Canadian Football championship game

Edmonton Eskimos	Hamilton Tiger-Cats
(13–3)	(8–7–1)
48	10
Head coach: Hugh Campbell	Head coach: John Payne
	1	2	3	4	Total
Edmonton Eskimos	10	14	10	14	48
Hamilton Tiger-Cats	3	6	1	0	10
- Date: November 23, 1980
- Stadium: Exhibition Stadium
- Location: Toronto
- Most Valuable Player: Offence: Warren Moon, QB, (Eskimos); Defence: Dale Potter, LB (Eskimos)
- Most Valuable Canadian: Dale Potter, LB (Eskimos)
- Referee: Don Barker
- Halftime show: Roger Whittaker
- Attendance: 54,661

Broadcasters
- Network: CBC, CTV, SRC

The 68th Grey Cup was played on November 23, 1980, before 54,661 fans at Exhibition Stadium in Toronto. The Edmonton Eskimos defeated the Hamilton Tiger-Cats 48–10 in one of the most lopsided victories in Grey Cup history.

== Scoring ==
Edmonton Eskimos - 48
Touchdowns - Tom Scott (3); Jim Germany (2); Brian Kelly (1)
Field Goals - Dave Cutler (2)
Converts - Dave Cutler (6)

Hamilton Tiger-Cats - 10
Field Goals - Bernie Ruoff (3)
Single - Bernie Ruoff (1)

== Trivia ==
Referee Don Barker called the game with four seconds remaining, as jubilant fans had by that point stormed the playing field.

Though Eskimo fans cherish this as Edmonton's most dominating triumph and their third consecutive of a record five straight Grey Cup victories, the 1980 game was hardly a classic; it remains one of the biggest blowouts in CFL championship history. The only larger margin of victory in a Grey Cup game came in 1923 in the 11th Grey Cup, when Queen's University blanked the Regina Rugby Club 54–0.

As of 2021, the 1980 game is the most recent Grey Cup in which one team did not score a touchdown. All the Tiger-Cats' points were scored by kicker Bernie Ruoff.
