= Jim Germany =

American gridiron football player (born 1953)

No. 25
- Position: Running back

Personal information
- Born: February 2, 1953 (age 73); New Waverly, Texas, U.S.

Career information
- High school: DeWitt Clinton (Bronx, New York)
- College: New Mexico State
- NFL draft: 1975: 2nd round, 46th overall pick

Career history
- 1975: St. Louis Cardinals*
- 1975: Green Bay Packers*
- 1976: Dallas Cowboys*
- 1977–1983: Edmonton Eskimos (CFL)
- * Offseason or practice squad member only

Awards and highlights
- 5× Grey Cup champion (1978, 1979, 1980, 1981, 1982); Eddie James Memorial Trophy (1979); CFL All-Star (1981); CFL West All-Star (1981); Eskimos records: Most rushing touchdowns – season (18) – 1981; Most rushing touchdowns – game (4) – August 1, 1981

Jim Germany (born February 2, 1953), is a former star running back in the Canadian Football League (CFL).

He played his college football at New Mexico State University, where he inducted into their Hall of Fame in 1994. He was drafted by the National Football League (NFL)'s St. Louis Cardinals in the second round of the 1975 NFL draft, 46th overall. He was signed by the Cardinals and then traded to the Packers at the start of the season. The Packers released him a week later. The next year he was signed and released by the Dallas Cowboys and in the spring he was signed by the Eskimos.

His seven-year career with the Edmonton Eskimos, starting in 1977, saw him paired with Neil Lumsden and quarterbacks Warren Moon and Tom Wilkinson. Together they formed the backfield backbone of the Eskimos' 5 Grey Cup championship dynasty. Germany rushed for 1,000 yards 3 times, 1004 yards in 1977, 1324 yards in 1979, and 1019 yards in 1980, and he was an all star in 1981. In 1981, he tied a CFL record with 18 rushing touchdowns.

In 2022 Germany was inducted into the Edmonton Elks Wall of Honour.
