= Larry Highbaugh =

American gridiron football player (1949–2017)

No. 13
- Position: Defensive back

Personal information
- Born: January 14, 1949; Indianapolis, Indiana, U.S.
- Died: March 21, 2017 (aged 68); Snellville, Georgia, U.S.
- Listed height: 5 ft 9 in (1.75 m)
- Listed weight: 175 lb (79 kg)

Career information
- College: Indiana

Career history
- 1971–1972: BC Lions
- 1972–1983: Edmonton Eskimos

Awards and highlights
- 6× Grey Cup champion (1975, 1978–1982); 3× CFL All-Star (1973, 1974, 1977); 4× CFL West All-Star (1973, 1974, 1975, 1977); Edmonton Eskimos Wall of Honour (1996); Eskimos records: Longest kick return (118) – October 17, 1976; Longest punt return (116) – October 26, 1975; Most interceptions – career (66); Most interception return yards – career (770); Most kick return touchdowns – career (3)
- Canadian Football Hall of Fame (Class of 2004)

Larry Highbaugh (January 14, 1949 – March 21, 2017) was an American professional football defensive back who played with the BC Lions from 1971 to 1972 and the Edmonton Eskimos from 1972 to 1983 of the Canadian Football League (CFL).

Highbaugh attended Indiana University at Bloomington, where he competed on the football and track teams. As a sprinter the Indiana Hoosiers track and field team, Highbaugh finished 7th in the 100-yard dash at the 1969 NCAA Division I Outdoor Track and Field Championships.

He won six Grey Cup championships while with the Eskimos and was a three-time CFL All-Star.

Highbaugh was inducted into the Canadian Football Hall of Fame in 2004 and in November, 2006, was voted one of the CFL's Top 50 players (#38) of the league's modern era by Canadian television sports network TSN.

After his football career ended he taught at South Gwinnett High School in Snellville, Georgia and died there at age 68.

His grandson, Tre Roberson, is a cornerback who played for the Calgary Stampeders of the CFL.
