= Vincent Blanchard =

Canadian gridiron football player (born 1998)

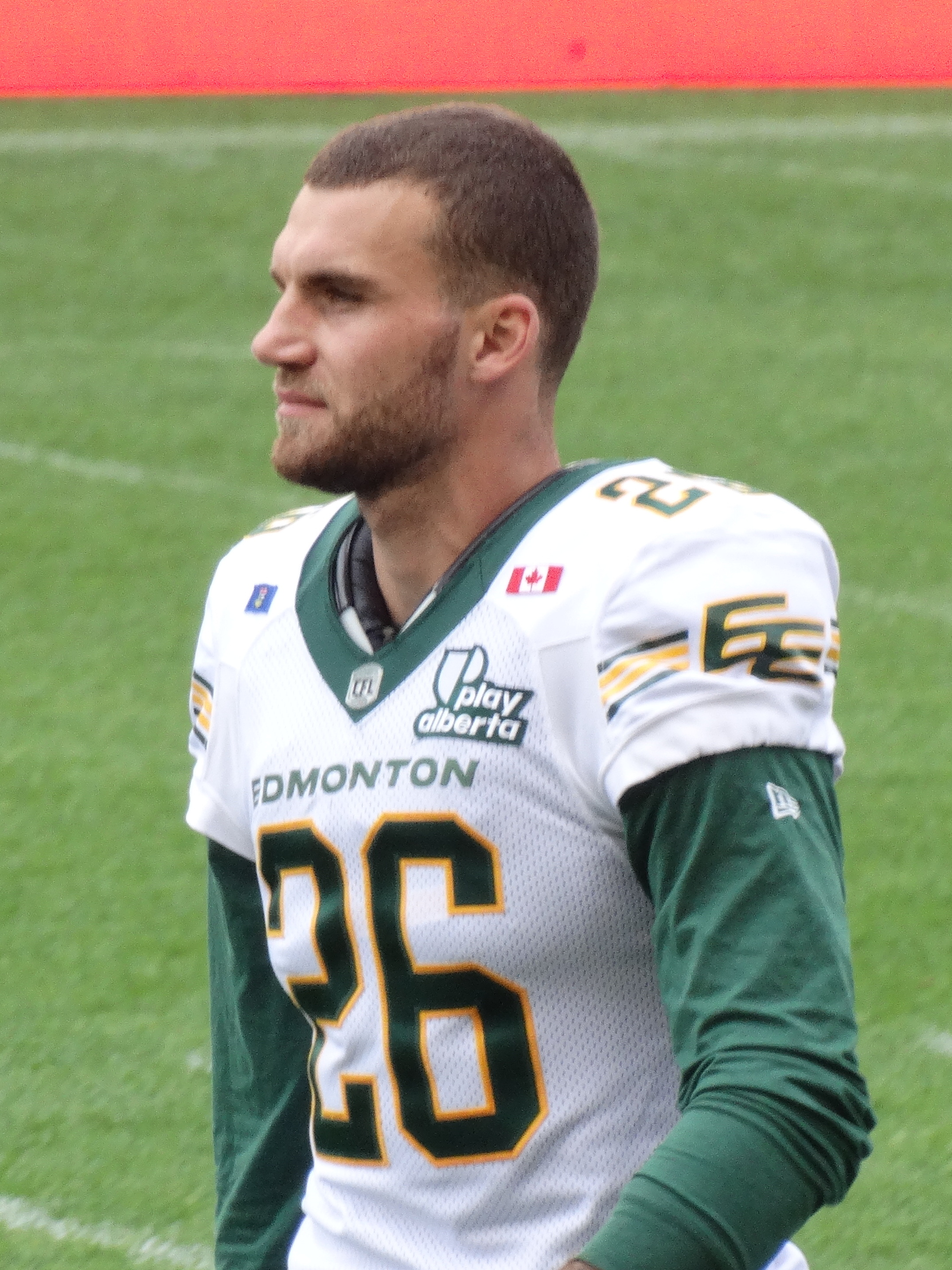
- Blanchard with the Edmonton Elks in 2025

No. 26 – Edmonton Elks
- Position: Placekicker
- Roster status: Active
- CFL status: National

Personal information
- Born: June 17, 1998 (age 28); Quebec City, Quebec, Canada
- Listed height: 6 ft 1 in (1.85 m)
- Listed weight: 210 lb (95 kg)

Career information
- University: Laval
- CFL draft: 2024: 4th round, 31st overall pick

Career history
- 2024–present: Edmonton Elks

Awards and highlights
- Grey Cup champion (2026); CFL West All-Star (2026); Vanier Cup champion (2022); Second-team All-Canadian (2023); CFL records: Most field goals in a game = 9 (2026)

Career CFL statistics as of 2026
- Field goals made: 91
- Field goals attempted: 105
- Field goal %: 86.7
- Extra points made: 82
- Extra points attempted: 89
- Extra point %: 92.1
- Punts / Yds: 12 / 524
- Longest field goal: 57
- Stats at CFL.ca

Vincent Blanchard (born June 17, 1998) is a Canadian professional football placekicker for the Edmonton Elks of the Canadian Football League (CFL).

== University career ==
Blanchard played U Sports football for the Laval Rouge et Or from 2019 to 2022. He played in 29 games where he made 53 of 71 field goal attempts (74.6%) and had 14 singles. He also had 186 punts for a 39.7-yard average. In 2022, Blanchard was five-for-five for field goals in the 57th Vanier Cup game as the Rouge et Or defeated the Saskatchewan Huskies by a score of 30–24.

== Professional career ==
Pre-draft measurables
Height	Weight
6 ft 0 5/8 in (1.84 m)	210 lb (95 kg)
Values from Pro Day

Blanchard was drafted in the fourth round, 31st overall, by the Edmonton Elks in the 2024 CFL draft and signed with the team on May 13, 2024. Following training camp in 2024, he was released on June 2, 2024. However, he was re-signed to the practice roster near the end of the season on October 19, 2024. He made his CFL debut in the final game of the 2024 regular season, on October 25, 2024, against the Toronto Argonauts where he was successful on his only field goal attempt and also made one of two point-after converts. He also had five kickoffs for a 63.8-yard average.

On September 26, 2026, Blanchard set a CFL record with nine made field goals in the Week 17 matchup against the Hamilton Tiger-Cats.
