= Joe Hollimon =

American gridiron football player (born 1952)

No. 29
- Position: Defensive back

Personal information
- Born: November 5, 1952 (age 74); Trumann, Arkansas, U.S.
- Listed height: 6 ft 0 in (1.83 m)
- Listed weight: 200 lb (91 kg)

Career information
- College: Arkansas State
- NFL draft: 1975: 8th round, 207th overall pick

Career history
- 1976–1985: Edmonton Eskimos

Awards and highlights
- 5× Grey Cup champion (1978−1982); CFL All-Star (1978); 3× CFL West All-Star (1976, 1978, 1982); Eskimos records: Most interception return touchdowns – career (7); Most kick returns – game (8) - October 31, 1976; Most kick return yards – game (239) - October 31, 1976

Joe Hollimon (born November 5, 1952) is an American former professional football defensive back for the Edmonton Eskimos of the Canadian Football League (CFL) from 1976 to 1985. He won six Grey Cups while a member of the Eskimos. He was a three-time Western Conference All-Star Corner Back (1976, 78, 82) and was a CFL All-Star in 1978.
