= Winston October =

Guyanese gridiron football player and coach (born 1976)

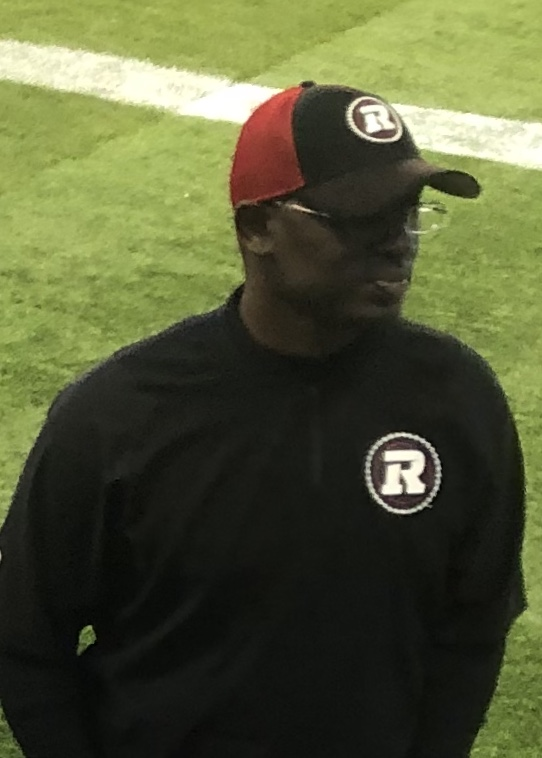
- October with the Ottawa Redblacks in 2019

William & Mary Tribe
- Title: Offensive coordinator

Personal information
- Born: July 12, 1976 (age 50); Guyana
- Listed height: 5 ft 8 in (1.73 m)
- Listed weight: 170 lb (77 kg)

Career information
- College: Richmond
- NFL draft: 1999: undrafted

Career history

Playing
- Montreal Alouettes (1999–2000); Washington Redskins (2001); Edmonton Eskimos (2001–2004)

Coaching
- VMI (2007–2008) Cornerbacks coach; VMI (2009–2013) Wide receivers coach; William & Mary (2014–2017) Wide receivers coach; Ottawa Redblacks (2018–2019) Wide receivers coach; Edmonton Elks (2020–2021) Passing game coordinator & wide receivers coach; Richmond (2022) Wide receivers coach; Richmond (2023) Co-offensive coordinator & wide receivers coach; Richmond (2024) Offensive coordinator & wide receivers coach; William & Mary (2025–present) Offensive coordinator

Awards and highlights
- Grey Cup champion (2003)

Winston October (born July 12, 1976) a Guyanese college football coach and former defensive back. He is the offensive coordinator for the College of William & Mary's Tribe football team, a position he has held since 2025. He was previously wide receivers coach and passing game coordinator for the Edmonton Elks of the Canadian Football League (CFL). He is a former Canadian football defensive back who played six seasons in the CFL with the Montreal Alouettes and Eskimos. He played college football at the University of Richmond. He was also a member of the Washington Redskins of the National Football League.

== Early life ==
October attended Gar-Field Senior High School in Woodbridge, Virginia.

== College career ==
October was a four-time All-Atlantic 10 defensive back selection while playing for the Richmond Spiders. He also served as team captain during the Spiders' Atlantic 10 championship season in 1998 and was named All-America by The Sports Network. He finished his career ranked first on the conference's all-time punt return yardage list.

== Professional career ==
October signed with the Montreal Alouettes in 1999. He was used mainly as a kick returner, also seeing time at defensive back. He returned two punts for touchdowns and a missed field 111 yards for a touchdown during the 2000 CFL season. He became a free agent after the 2000 season.

October spent the 2001 offseason with the Washington Redskins of the National Football League after signing with the team in April 2001.

October was signed by the Edmonton Eskimos in September 2001 and played for the team through the 2004 CFL season. He returned four punts for touchdowns during his time with the Eskimos. He also had 1,018 kickoff return yards in 2003 and 1,073 in 2004. October saw time as a wide receiver, recording 19 receptions for 196 yards in 2003.

== Coaching career ==
In 2007, October joined the VMI Keydets coaching staff as an assistant coach, spending his first two season coaching the secondary. He became the wide receivers coach in 2009, a position he held for five years.

In March 2014, October became the William & Mary Tribe's wide receivers coach. Winston remained with William & Mary through the 2017 season.

In 2018, October joined the Ottawa Redblacks of the CFL. The following offseason offensive coordinator Jaime Elizondo left the team which expanded Winston's role for the 2019 season to include the responsibility of play calling.

On January 15, 2020, it was announced that October had joined the Edmonton Elks as the team's receivers coach and passing game coordinator.

In January 2022, October joined the staff at his alma mater, Richmond, as the wide receivers coach. In 2023, he was promoted to co-offensive coordinator.

In 2025, October rejoined William & Mary as the offensive coordinator.
