= George McGowan =

American gridiron football player (born 1948)

No. 76
- Position: Wide receiver

Personal information
- Born: March 10, 1948 (age 78); Bethesda, Maryland, U.S.
- Listed height: 6 ft 2 in (1.88 m)
- Listed weight: 190 lb (86 kg)

Career information
- College: Kansas

Career history
- 1971–1978: Edmonton Eskimos

Awards and highlights
- 2× Grey Cup champion (1975, 1978); CFL's Most Outstanding Player Award (1973); Jeff Nicklin Memorial Trophy (1973); 3× CFL All-Star (1973, 1975, 1976); 3× CFL West All-Star (1973, 1975, 1976); Edmonton Eskimos Wall of Honour (1985); Eskimos record: Most receptions – game (15) - September 3, 1973
- Canadian Football Hall of Fame (Class of 2003)

George McGowan (born March 10, 1948) is an American former professional football player for the Edmonton Eskimos of the Canadian Football League (CFL) where he played for eight seasons from 1971 to 1978. During his career with the Eskimos, he set CFL league records for most catches in a game (15) and most catches in a season (98) and won two Grey Cups before his career was cut short by knee injuries. McGowan was elected to the Canadian Football Hall of Fame in 2003.

== Early life ==
Born in Bethesda, Maryland, on March 10, 1948, he grew up Glendale, California. McGowan attended University of Kansas and played for the Jayhawks for two years. In 1968, he had great success as a receiver, with 32 receptions for 592 yards and five touchdowns. In 1969, he was moved to defensive back, and was less impressive.

It took McGowan several training camps (one with the Atlanta Falcons in the NFL) and a couple of years until he ended up in Edmonton as a receiver.

== CFL career ==
He would play 8 seasons in Edmonton. In his first year, 1971, he caught 49 passes for 827 yards, and 54 for 1015 yards the next season. 1973 was one of his greatest years, and his 81 catches for 1,123 yards won him the CFL's Most Outstanding Player Award.

An injury limited his performance to 8 receptions in 1974, but McGowan provided the comeback story of the next year, catching a then-record 98 passes for 1,472 yards. In his last three seasons, injuries steadily limited his effectiveness, and he caught 60, 40 and 34 passes respectively during that time.

His career totals were 424 receptions for 6,356 yards (14.9 yard average) and 42 touchdowns. He was an all star 3 times and played in 5 Grey Cup games, winning two. He also caught a then-record 15 passes in the September 3, 1973, game against the Saskatchewan Roughriders.

George McGowan was always considered the equal of the great receivers of his day, and was elected to the Canadian Football Hall of Fame in 2003.

His former head coach, Ray Jauch, recalled, "George ran patterns just like they were drawn up in the playbook. He'd get to the correct spot and catch the ball. And although he didn't possess great speed, his quickness allowed him to break the odd long one. He could run with almost anyone for the first 30 or 40 yards." He is remembered for his hand-eye coordination and for catching as well in a crowd as in the open.
