= Mike Pringle =

Mike Pringle may refer to:

- Mike Pringle (gridiron football) (born 1967), American former professional gridiron football player
- Mike Pringle (physician) (born 1950), English general practitioner
- Mike Pringle (politician) (born 1945), Scottish Liberal Democrat politician

== See also ==
- Mike Pringley (born 1976), American football defensive end
