= Shalon Baker =

American gridiron football player and coach (born 1973)

Biographical details
- Born: August 22, 1973 (age 53); Seattle, Washington, U.S.
- Education: University of Montana

Playing career
- 1991–1994: Montana
- 1995–1996: Edmonton Eskimos
- 1997: Winnipeg Blue Bombers
- 1998–2005: San Jose SaberCats
- Position: Wide receiver

Coaching career (HC unless noted)
- 2003–2004: Desert Mountain H.S. (OC)
- 2006–2009: Chandler H.S. (PGC/WR)
- 2010–2012: Montana (WR)

Accomplishments and honors

Championships
- 2 ArenaBowl (2002, 2004)

Awards
- CFL's Most Outstanding Rookie Award (1995); Jackie Parker Trophy (1995); All-Rookie Team (1998); All-Ironman Team (1999)

Shalon Baker (born August 22, 1973) is a former Canadian Football League player and a former player/coach in the Arena Football League.

Playing with the University of Montana Grizzlies between 1991 and 1994, Baker caught passes for 2,561 yards (3rd best in school history) and 26 touchdown receptions (a team record.)

He went to Canada, playing with the Edmonton Eskimos. In his first season, 1995, he had 79 catches gaining 1,156 yards and 5 touchdowns, and won the CFL's Most Outstanding Rookie Award. He played in the CFL for 2 more years, but did not enjoy the same success and after one season with the Winnipeg Blue Bombers in 1997, he left the CFL.

Baker started playing with the San Jose SaberCats of the Arena Football League in 1998 as a wide receiver/linebacker. This was the beginning of a 7-year career, in which Baker would catch 261 passes for 3551 yards and 61 touchdowns. He would also make 128 tackles and 7 interceptions.

Baker ended his playing career as the All-Time leader in assisted tackles and ranks in the top 10 in 9 categories for the San Jose SaberCats. In 2006, he began a new career as the Offensive Coordinator of the World Champion San Jose SaberCats. Under Baker's direction the 2006 SaberCats became the most prolific offense in the history of the Arena Football League.

Baker is now a single father of daughters Kailyn, Quincy, Kendal and son Mason. He's the Business Development Specialist for Stockman Bank in Missoula Montana and he is an owner of Enzacare, a company that specializes in the remediation of microbials. He was the offensive analyst for the three time state champion Chandler Wolves at Chandler High School in Chandler, Arizona. He was hired by his alma mater, the University of Montana, as the Grizzlies Wide Receivers Coach in 2010.

== Childhood ==
Baker grew up in Vancouver, Washington, and graduated from Evergreen High School in 1991.
