= Steve Hmiel =

Canadian football player (born 1938)

Profile
- Positions: Halfback, Defensive back

Personal information
- Born: c. 1938 (age 87–88); Hamilton, Ontario, Canada
- Listed height: 5 ft 11 in (1.80 m)
- Listed weight: 195 lb (88 kg)

Career history
- 1960–1966: Hamilton Tiger-Cats

Awards and highlights
- Grey Cup champion (1965)

Steve Hmiel (born c. 1938) was a Canadian professional football player who played for the Hamilton Tiger-Cats. He won the Grey Cup with them in 1965.
