= Tom Scott (Canadian football) =

American gridiron football player (born 1951)

Profile
- Position: Slotback

Personal information
- Born: November 19, 1951 (age 74); Oakland, California, U.S.
- Listed height: 5 ft 10 in (1.78 m)
- Listed weight: 180 lb (82 kg)

Career information
- High school: Junípero Serra (San Mateo, California)
- College: Washington
- NFL draft: 1973: 12th round, 304th overall pick

Career history
- 1974–1977: Winnipeg Blue Bombers
- 1978–1983: Edmonton Eskimos
- 1984: Calgary Stampeders

Awards and highlights
- 5× Grey Cup champion (1978–1982); 5× CFL All- Star (1977, 1978, 1980, 1982, 1983); 6× CFL West All-Star (1974, 1977, 1978, 1980, 1982, 1983); Jackie Parker Trophy (1974); Jeff Nicklin Memorial Trophy (1982); Edmonton Eskimos Wall of Honour (1993); First-team All-Pac-8 (1971)
- Canadian Football Hall of Fame (Class of 1998)

Tom Scott (born November 19, 1951) is a former Canadian Football League (CFL) receiver for the Winnipeg Blue Bombers, Edmonton Eskimos and Calgary Stampeders. He was drafted in the 12th round of the 1973 NFL Draft by the Detroit Lions. He joined Winnipeg as a wingback and returner. As the offenses evolved in 1970s, the wingbacks that had good receiver skills such as Scott resulted in the position gradually evolving into pure receiver position, now known as slotback. In an 11-year professional career from 1974–1984, he caught 649 passes for 10,837 yards and 88 touchdowns. Scott was a part of five consecutive Grey Cup winning teams with the Eskimos. He is a member of the Canadian Football Hall of Fame, where he was inducted in 1998.

Born and raised in northern California, Scott played college football at the University of Washington in Seattle, alongside quarterback Sonny Sixkiller.
