= Dave Fennell =

Canadian gridiron football player (born 1952)

No. 65
- Position: Defensive tackle

Personal information
- Born: February 4, 1953 (age 73); Edmonton, Alberta, Canada
- Listed height: 6 ft 3 in (1.91 m)
- Listed weight: 249 lb (113 kg)

Career information
- College: North Dakota

Career history
- 1974–1983: Edmonton Eskimos

Awards and highlights
- 6× Grey Cup champion (1975, 1978–1982); 2× Grey Cup MVP (1978, 1982); Dick Suderman Trophy (1982); CFL Most Outstanding Canadian (1979); 2× Dr. Beattie Martin Trophy (1979, 1980); 5× CFL All-Star (1977, 1978, 1979, 1980, 1981); 5× CFL West All-Star (1977, 1978, 1979, 1980, 1981); Edmonton Eskimos Wall of Honour (1984)
- Canadian Football Hall of Fame (Class of 1990)

Dave Fennell (born February 4, 1953) is a Canadian former defensive lineman for the Edmonton Eskimos of the Canadian Football League (CFL). After graduating from the University of North Dakota in 1973, he played for Edmonton from 1974 to 1983, and helped lead the team to five straight Grey Cup championships from 1978 to 1982 as a key member of the "Alberta Crude" defence.

Fennell was named CFL Most Outstanding Defensive Player in 1978, CFL Most Outstanding Canadian in 1979, and Defensive Star of the 1978 and 1982 Grey Cup games. He was a CFL and Western All-Star at defensive tackle from 1977 to 1981, and was runner-up for the Most Outstanding Canadian Award in 1980. His nickname was "Doctor Death".

Fennell is a member of the Canadian Football Hall of Fame and the Alberta Sports Hall of Fame. In November 2006, he was voted one of the CFL's Top 50 players (No. 24) of the league's modern era by Canadian sports network TSN.

Fennell earned a law degree from the University of Alberta in 1979. After retiring from football, he founded Golden Star Resources, which is a mining company that was focused on gold deposits in Guyana while he was working there. He was an executive vice-chairman and a director of Miramar Mining Corporation.

He is the father of John Fennell, a member of the Canadian luge team at the 2014 Winter Olympics in Sochi, Russia.
