= Sean Fleming (gridiron football) =

Canadian gridiron football player (born 1970)

No. 11
- Positions: Kicker, Punter

Personal information
- Born: March 19, 1970 (age 56); Burnaby, British Columbia, Canada
- Listed height: 6 ft 3 in (1.91 m)
- Listed weight: 190 lb (86 kg)

Career information
- High school: Vancouver College
- College: Wyoming
- CFL draft: 1992: 1st round, 6th overall pick

Career history
- 1992–2007: Edmonton Eskimos

Awards and highlights
- 3× Grey Cup champion (1993, 2003, 2005); Dick Suderman Trophy (1993); 4× Dave Dryburgh Memorial Trophy (1994, 1997, 2001, 2004); 2× CFL All-Star (2002, 2004); 4× CFL West All-Star (2001–2004); 3× Eskimos' Most Outstanding Canadian Player (2001, 2002, 2004); 2× Second-team All-WAC (1989, 1990); Eskimos records: Longest kickoff (95) - 2 times; Longest punt (91) - September 28, 1997; Most converts – career (713); Most converts - game (9) - September 15, 1995; Most field goals – career (553); Most field goals – game (6) - 3 times; Most kickoff yards – career (69,973); Most kickoff yards – season (5,732) - 1992; Most kickoff yards – game (588) - October 29, 1993; Most points – career (2,571); Most punts – career (1,264); Most punting yards – career (52,927)
- Stats at CFL.ca

Sean Fleming (born March 19, 1970) is a Canadian former professional football placekicker and punter. Fleming was selected sixth overall by the Canadian Football League (CFL)'s Edmonton Eskimos out of the University of Wyoming in the 1992 CFL draft. He attended Vancouver College when he was in high school.

Fleming played sixteen seasons in the Canadian Football League, all with the Eskimos. He is a four-time CFL West Division All-Star (twice named CFL All-Star) and three-time Eskimos nominee for Most Outstanding Canadian. He has played in five Grey Cups, winning three, and was named the 81st Grey Cup's Most Valuable Canadian. He kicked the game-winning field goal in overtime for the Eskimos in the 93rd Grey Cup. Fleming holds the Eskimos' records for points (2,571), field goals (553), converts (713), punts (1,264), punt yardage (52,957) and kickoff yardage (69,973). Fleming was inducted into the club's Wall of Honour in 2011.
