= Brian Kelly (wide receiver) =

American gridiron football player (born 1956)

No. 70
- Position: Wide receiver

Personal information
- Born: March 27, 1956 (age 70); Arcadia, California, U.S.

Career information
- High school: Bishop Amat Memorial (La Puente, California)
- College: Washington State

Career history
- 1979–1987: Edmonton Eskimos

Awards and highlights
- 5× Grey Cup champion (1979–1982, 1987); Jeff Nicklin Memorial Trophy (1987); CFL's Most Outstanding Rookie Award (1979); Jackie Parker Trophy (1979); 6× CFL All-Star (1979, 1980, 1981, 1983, 1984, 1987); 5× CFL West All-Star (1980, 1981, 1983, 1984, 1987); Edmonton Eskimos Wall of Honour (1989); Eskimos records: Most receptions – career (575); Most receiving yards – career (11,169); Most receiving 1000-YD seasons – career (6) – (1979, 1981, 1983–85, 1987); Most receiving yards – season (1,812) – 1983; Most receiving touchdowns – career (97); Most receiving touchdowns – season (18); Most receiving touchdowns – game (4) – June 30, 1984; Most touchdowns – career (97)
- Canadian Football Hall of Fame (Class of 1991)

Brian Kelly (born March 27, 1956) is an American former professional football player who was a wide receiver for nine seasons with the Edmonton Eskimos of the Canadian Football League (CFL). Playing from 1979 to 1987, he caught 575 passes for 11,169 yards and 97 touchdowns. Kelly was a member of 5 Grey Cup championship teams in Edmonton. He was the No. 1 target of Eskimos quarterback Warren Moon in the early 1980s. Kelly was inducted into the Canadian Football Hall of Fame. He was voted one of the CFL's top 50 players (No. 20) in a poll conducted by Canadian sports network TSN. He graduated from Bishop Amat High School in La Puente, California.
