= 70th Grey Cup =

1982 Canadian Football championship game

Edmonton Eskimos	Toronto Argonauts
(11–5)	(9–6–1)
32	16
Head coach: Hugh Campbell	Head coach: Bob O'Billovich
	1	2	3	4	Total
Edmonton Eskimos	3	17	6	6	32
Toronto Argonauts	7	7	0	2	16
- Date: November 28, 1982
- Stadium: Exhibition Stadium
- Location: Toronto
- Most Valuable Player: Offence: Warren Moon, QB (Eskimos); Defence: Dave Fennell, DT (Eskimos)
- Most Valuable Canadian: Dave Fennell, DT (Eskimos)
- National anthem: St. Michael's College School Choir
- Referee: Bud Ulrich
- Attendance: 54,741

Broadcasters
- Network: CBC, CTV, SRC

The 70th Grey Cup, also known as the "Rain Bowl", was the 1982 Grey Cup Canadian Football League championship game between the Toronto Argonauts and the Edmonton Eskimos. The Eskimos, who were making their sixth consecutive appearance in the CFL championship game, defeated the Argonauts 32–16 on the Eskimos' way to their fifth straight Grey Cup. The game was played on Sunday, November 28, 1982, at Exhibition Stadium in Toronto.

== Game summary ==
The Eskimos' bid for a record-breaking fifth consecutive Grey Cup victory looked to be in jeopardy at mid-season, as they began the year with a 3-5 record. But 10 straight victories later, they found themselves once again in the Grey Cup, pitted against the underdog Toronto Argonauts. The Boatmen had last won a Cup in 1952 and last appeared in the CFL Final in 1971, and their hometown fans were giddy with expectation. Winners of only two games the previous season, the Argos took a 9-6-1 record into the 1982 Grey Cup game.

The game, played in a driving rainstorm, started well for Toronto. After the Eskimo's Dave Cutler kicked a field goal, newly acquired Emanuel Tolbert scampered 84 yards for a touchdown off a screen pass for the Argonauts. The Eskimos replied with a Brian Kelly touchdown reception, but the Argos scored again, with Condredge Holloway completing a 10-yard pass to Terry Greer.

Toronto now led 14-10, but from this point Edmonton and Warren Moon (the game MVP) would not look back. With the Argonauts unable to move the ball with the wind in the third quarter, the Esks took control. Another touchdown pass to Brian Kelly, a Neil Lumsden touchdown rush and three more Cutler field goals sealed the victory for the CFL's greatest dynasty.

Moon completed 21 of 33 passes for 319 yards, all while having to throw in the freezing rain.

== Scoring ==
Edmonton Eskimos - 32
Touchdowns - Brian Kelly (2), Neil Lumsden (1)
Field Goals - Dave Cutler (4)
Converts - Dave Cutler (2)

Toronto Argonauts - 16
Touchdowns - Emanuel Tolbert (1), Terry Greer (1)
Converts - 2
Safety - 1

== Aftermath and legacy ==
The 1982 Grey Cup broadcast drew the largest Canadian TV audience up to that time.

In 1982, the Toronto Argonauts were playing home games at Exhibition Stadium. The players and fans were forced to endure awful conditions due to the rain and cold—a problem exacerbated by the fact that much of the stadium was completely exposed to the elements. Many fans had to watch the game from the concession area. Outraged fans began calling for a domed stadium the following day; at a rally at Toronto City Hall, thousands of fans who had come to see the Grey Cup chanted, "We want a dome!" As a result, discussions began which ultimately led to the construction and opening of SkyDome (now Rogers Centre) in 1989. The Argos played their home games at the stadium from 1989 to 2015.

This was the fourth time in seven years that the baseball-renovated Exhibition Stadium had hosted the game (it also hosted in 1976, 1978 and 1980), and the twelfth and final time overall. While the facility trails only nearby Varsity Stadium for number of times hosting the Grey Cup, this record unlikely to be matched, as the next closest, BC Place Stadium, has hosted only ten times as of 2025.

Ten years after the Blue Jays and the Argonauts departed it, Exhibition Stadium was demolished in 1999. A few years later BMO Field was built as a soccer-specific stadium, approximately where Exhibition Stadium once stood. BMO Field was later renovated to accommodate the Argonauts for the 2016 CFL season and that year hosted the 104th Grey Cup, marking the CFL championship game's return to the Exhibition grounds after a 34-year absence.
