= 75th Grey Cup =

1987 Canadian Football championship game

Edmonton Eskimos	Toronto Argonauts
(11–7)	(11–6–1)
38	36
Head coach: Joe Faragalli	Head coach: Bob O'Billovich
	1	2	3	4	Total
Edmonton Eskimos	10	7	4	17	38
Toronto Argonauts	3	21	3	9	36
- Date: November 29, 1987
- Stadium: BC Place Stadium
- Location: Vancouver
- Most Valuable Player: Offence: Damon Allen, QB (Eskimos); Defence: Stewart Hill, DE (Eskimos)
- Most Valuable Canadian: Milson Jones, RB (Eskimos)
- National anthem: The Nylons
- Referee: Jake Ireland
- Attendance: 59,478

Broadcasters
- Network: CBC, Canadian Football Network, SRC
- Announcers: CBC: Don Wittman, Ron Lancaster, Brian Williams, Steve Armitage. CFN: Dave Hodge, Neil Lumsden, Bob Irving. SRC: N/A.

The 75th Grey Cup was the 1987 Canadian Football League championship game that was played at BC Place Stadium in Vancouver, between the Edmonton Eskimos and the Toronto Argonauts. The Eskimos defeated the Argonauts 38–36, on Jerry Kauric's last-minute field goal.

== Game summary ==
Edmonton Eskimos - (38) TDs, Henry Williams, Marco Cyncar, Brian Kelly, Damon Allen; FGs, Jerry Kauric (3); cons., Kauric (4), singles, Kauric.

Toronto Argonauts - (36) TDs, Gil Fenerty (2), Doug Landry, Danny Barrett; FGs, Lance Chomyc (3); cons., Lance Chomyc (3).

The Edmonton Eskimos and Toronto Argonauts engaged in a back-and-forth battle for Earl Grey's Cup in 1987, which was determined with a late field goal.

The lead changed hands five times before Jerry Kauric booted a 49-yard field goal to secure a two-point victory for the Eskimos.

The fireworks went off early when Henry 'Gizmo' Williams fielded a missed field goal and out ran Toronto defenders for 112-yard return for a touchdown, setting a new Grey Cup record and giving the Eskimos the early lead. Toronto's Lance Chomyc missed on two field goals in the opening 15 minutes.

Trailing 10-3 in the second quarter, Argos fullback Gil Fenerty took a pass from Gilbert Renfroe and ran 61 yards down the sidelines for Toronto's first major. A costly interception set up Toronto's second touchdown drive when Fenerty followed his blockers for a five-yard score.

Another costly turnover by the Eskimos put the Argos in front 24-10. Toronto's Doug Landry picked up a fumble and ran 54 yards to the end zone.

Things appeared to go from bad to worse when Eskimos starting quarterback Matt Dunigan went down to a head injury. But Edmonton had a quality backup pivot in Damon Allen, who flipped a six-yard touchdown pass to Marco Cyncar prior to halftime, cutting the deficit to 24-17. The drive began following a blocked punt by Stanley Blair.

After outscoring the Argos 4-3 in the third quarter Edmonton restored its lead on the first play of the fourth quarter when Allen hit Brian Kelly for a 15-yard touchdown pass, putting the Eskimos in front 28-27.

A Chomyc field goal put Toronto back in front. But Allen's mobility caused fits for the Argos defence, and may have been the difference in the game. He gave the Eskimos a five-point edge with 6:39 remaining in the game with a 17-yard run on a bootleg.

Toronto was also forced to go to its backup quarterback when Renfroe was forced out with a knee injury. But his replacement, Danny Barrett, was equal to the task. Barrett called his own number with 2:43 remaining, busting up the middle 25 yards for a major, giving the Argos a 36-35 lead.

But the Argos suffered a setback when they missed on an attempted two-point conversion. This allowed the Eskimos to win the game on Kauric's field goal.

== Media coverage ==
After the CTV network ceased its relationship with the CFL the previous season, a new broadcast service was established this season in its place, called the Canadian Football Network (CFN), which was run by the league itself. For this and the next three Grey Cup games after this one, they broadcast the Grey Cup game, but unlike the previous practice in place from 1971 to 1986 when both CTV and CBC pooled their commentary teams to call the game, the CFN called the Grey Cup game in its entirety separate from the CBC.

Paul Graham produced the television coverage for CFN.

== 1987 CFL Playoffs ==
=== West Division ===
- Semi-final (November 15 @ Edmonton, Alberta) Edmonton Eskimos 30-16 Calgary Stampeders
- Final (November 22 @ Vancouver, British Columbia) Edmonton Eskimos 31-7 BC Lions

=== East Division ===
- Semi-final (November 15 @ Toronto, Ontario) Toronto Argonauts 29-13 Hamilton Tiger-Cats
- Final (November 22 @ Winnipeg, Manitoba) Toronto Argonauts 19-3 Winnipeg Blue Bombers
