= 81st Grey Cup =

1993 Canadian Football championship game

Edmonton Eskimos	Winnipeg Blue Bombers
(12–6)	(14–4)
33	23
Head coach: Ron Lancaster	Head coach: Cal Murphy
	1	2	3	4	Total
Edmonton Eskimos	17	7	0	9	33
Winnipeg Blue Bombers	0	10	7	6	23
- Date: November 28, 1993
- Stadium: McMahon Stadium
- Location: Calgary
- Most Valuable Player: Damon Allen, QB (Eskimos)
- Most Valuable Canadian: Sean Fleming, K/P (Eskimos)
- Referee: Dave Yule
- Attendance: 50,035

Broadcasters
- Network: CBC, SRC, SportsChannel America
- Announcers: (CBC) Don Wittman, James Curry, Dan Kepley, Brian Williams, Steve Armitage.

The 81st Grey Cup was the 1993 Canadian Football League championship game played between the Edmonton Eskimos and the Winnipeg Blue Bombers at McMahon Stadium in Calgary, Alberta. The Eskimos defeated the Blue Bombers 33–23 to win the Grey Cup.

== Game summary ==
Edmonton Eskimos (33) - TDs, Lucius Floyd, Jim Sandusky; FGs, Sean Fleming (6); cons., Fleming (2); singles, Fleming.

Winnipeg Blue Bombers (23) - TDs, Michael Richardson, Sammy Garza; FGs, Troy Westwood (3); cons., Troy Westwood (2).

First quarter
EDM – TD Floyd 4-yard run (Fleming convert)
EDM – TD Sandusky 2-yard pass from Damon Allen (Fleming convert)
EDM – FG Fleming
Second quarter
EDM – Single Fleming
EDM – FG Fleming 26-yard field goal
WPG - TD Richardson 3-yard run (Westwood convert)
EDM – FG Fleming
WPG – FG Westwood
Third quarter
WPG - TD Garza 1-yard run (Westwood convert)
Fourth quarter
WPG – FG Westwood 32-yard field goal
EDM – FG Fleming
EDM – FG Fleming
WPG – FG Westwood
EDM – FG Fleming

The Winnipeg Blue Bombers returned to the Grey Cup in 1993 but once again they were foiled by an Alberta club.

The Edmonton Eskimos went out in front 21-0 before hanging on to their 11th Grey Cup title. The Blue Bombers cut their deficit to 24–20 in the fourth quarter before yielding to defeat again.

Winnipeg miscues in the first quarter led to its downfall. The Eskimos took advantage of a blocked punt, a fumbled kickoff return and an interception within the first 10 minutes of the game. Lucius Floyd scored on a four-yard carry, while Jim Sandusky caught a two-yard pass from Damon Allen. Sean Fleming added a field goal at the end of the quarter.

Another Winnipeg fumble in the second quarter, this time on a punt return, put the Eskimos in front by three converted touchdowns following Fleming's 26-yard field goal.

The Blue Bombers finally got on the scoreboard late in the first half on Michael Richardson's three-yard run. Both teams exchanged field goals as Edmonton held a 24–10 lead at halftime.

Winnipeg made a game of it in the second half, as quarterback Sammy Garza scored on a one-yard keeper. The Blue Bombers closed the gap to four on Troy Westwood's 32-yard field goal in the fourth quarter.

But Edmonton's offence got back on track to close out the game. Fleming booted three field goals for a record-tying six for the game. Westwood managed just one other.

Winnipeg was still within a touchdown with two minutes and 44 seconds remaining, but Allen put together a 12-play drive leading to Fleming's final field goal.

== Trivia ==
- Sean Fleming, who hit six field goals to win the Grey Cup Most Valuable Canadian award, tied a Grey Cup record held by Don Sweet of the Montreal Alouettes (65th Grey Cup) and Paul Osbaldiston of the Hamilton Tiger-Cats (74th Grey Cup).
- In honour of the CFL's first US-based team, the Sacramento Gold Miners (which began play this season), "The Star-Spangled Banner" was sung at a Grey Cup game for the first time, before the standard playing of "O Canada". This routine would continue in the next two Grey Cup games.
- Edmonton Eskimos centre Rod Connop was the only player that was a part of the team's dynasty years from 1978 to 1982.
- This was the second Grey Cup game to be played in Calgary. The temperature was a balmy 6 °C, compared to the first Calgary game (63rd Grey Cup) when it was −15 °C with a wind of 25 km/h.
- The Blue Bombers lost the ball a total of seven times on turnovers with 23 of Edmonton's points coming off Winnipeg's miscues. It was Edmonton's eighth-straight victory to close out the year.
- Blue Bombers quarterback Matt Dunigan did not play because of an Achilles tendon injury, and was replaced by Garza.
- Referee Dave Yule suffered a ruptured calf muscle in the second quarter, forcing alternate Ken Lazaruk into action.

== 1993 CFL Playoffs ==
=== West Division ===
- Semi-final (November 14 @ Edmonton, Alberta) Edmonton Eskimos 51-13 Saskatchewan Roughriders
- Semi-final (November 14 @ Calgary, Alberta) Calgary Stampeders 17-9 BC Lions
- Final (November 19 @ Calgary, Alberta) Edmonton Eskimos 29-15 Calgary Stampeders

=== East Division ===
- Semi-final (November 13 @ Hamilton, Ontario) Hamilton Tiger-Cats 21-10 Ottawa Rough Riders
- Final (November 19 @ Winnipeg, Manitoba) Winnipeg Blue Bombers 20-19 Hamilton Tiger-Cats
