= Edmonton Elks =

Canadian Football League team

- Current season
- Logo
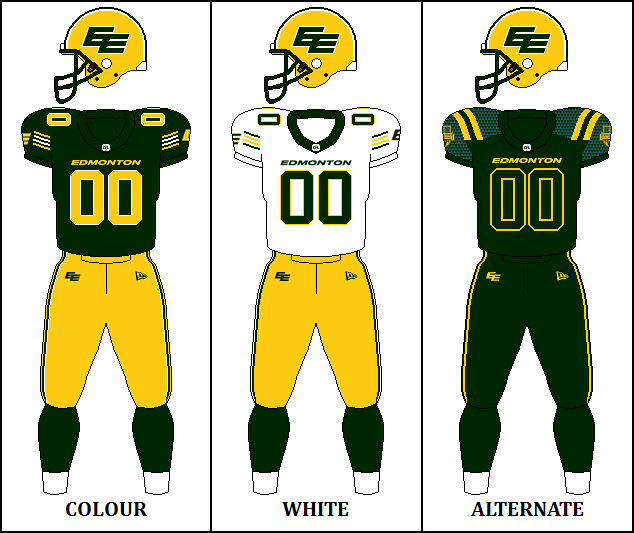
- Uniforms

General information
- Founded: 1949
- Stadium: Commonwealth Stadium
- Headquartered: Edmonton, Alberta, Canada
- Colours: Green, gold, white
- Mascot: Nanook and Punter
- Website: goelks.com

Personnel
- Owner: Estate of Larry Thompson
- General manager: Ed Hervey
- Head coach: Mark Kilam

Nicknames
- Esks, Eskies (1949–2020); The Double-E; The Evil Empire (1970s–1990s); The Herd (2021–present)

Team history
- Edmonton Eskimos (1949–2020); Edmonton Football Team/EE Football Team (2020–2021); Edmonton Elks (2021–present)

Home fields
- Clarke Stadium (1949–1978); Commonwealth Stadium (1978–present)

League / conference affiliations
- Canadian Football League: West Division

Championships
- Grey Cup wins: 15 (1954, 1955, 1956, 1975, 1978, 1979, 1980, 1981, 1982, 1987, 1993, 2003, 2005, 2015, 2026)

The Edmonton Elks are a professional Canadian football team based in Edmonton. The club competes in the Canadian Football League (CFL) as a member of the league's West Division and plays their home games at Commonwealth Stadium. The Elks were founded in 1949 as the Edmonton Eskimos and have won the Grey Cup championship 15 times (including a three-peat between 1954 and 1956 and an unmatched five consecutive wins between 1978 and 1982), most recently in 2026 and the most of any CFL club in Western Canada. The team has a rivalry with the Calgary Stampeders known as the Battle of Alberta. The team retired the Eskimos name in 2020 due to the Native American mascot controversy.

== History ==
=== Football in Edmonton 1895–1939 ===
The Edmonton Rugby Foot-ball Club, unaffiliated with the current team, was an early Canadian football-rugby union team based in Edmonton. The team played its first organized games with the formation of the Alberta Rugby Football League in 1895. In 1908 the name Esquimaux was adopted. In 1910 the club was officially named the Edmonton Eskimos and was briefly called the Edmonton Elks during 1922. (The city was represented by the Edmonton Civics in 1914 and the Edmonton Canucks in 1919.) After appearing in and losing the 9th Grey Cup and 10th Grey Cup games (being the first western teams to play for the Cup) the team folded in 1925, but returned for two seasons beginning 1928, and then folded again. It was succeeded by the Edmonton Boosters, who played for three more seasons, and the Edmonton Hi-Grads in 1936 (a team of high school graduate all stars.) Elite-level football returned to Edmonton in 1938 with a team once again called the Eskimos, this time in the Western Interprovincial Football Union (WIFU). This team ceased operating after only two seasons because of the Second World War.

=== Team history ===
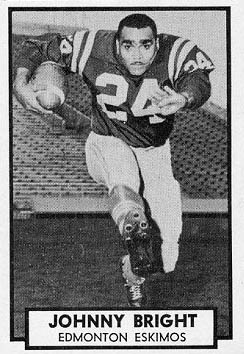
Johnny Bright with Edmonton in 1962

The current incarnation of the team began in the 1949 WIFU season as the Edmonton Eskimos under head coach Annis Stukus, for whom the CFL's annual coach of the year award is named. The team played home games at Clarke Stadium and quickly saw success under quarterback Jackie Parker and running back Johnny Bright, winning the Grey Cup three years in a row from 1954 to 1956. The team did not win the Grey Cup again until 1975, the longest drought in team history. The team moved to Commonwealth Stadium in 1978.

The team won five consecutive Grey Cups (1978–82), led by superstar quarterbacks Warren Moon and Tom Wilkinson and head coach Hugh Campbell. After a brief absence, Campbell returned to the team in 1986 and worked for Edmonton in an administrative capacity until his retirement in 2006. This five-year dynasty, followed by the dominance of the city's NHL team the Edmonton Oilers, led the city to be nicknamed the "City of Champions" in the 1980s. Edmonton made it to nine Grey Cups in a ten-year span from 1973 to 1982.

In the 1980s and 90s the team's marquee player was Gizmo Williams who still holds many CFL records in punt and kickoff returns and was a key part in Grey Cup victories in 1987 and 1993 under head coach Ron Lancaster. During this period the team was also known for its stellar defensive line, with future Canadian Football Hall of Famers like Danny Kepley and Danny Bass winning Defensive Player of the Year Awards and Willie Pless winning the trophy a record five times.

After winning the Grey Cup in both 2003 and 2005, under quarterback Ricky Ray, who is Edmonton's all-time leader in passing yards, the team missed the playoffs the following year, for the first time in 34 years, a North American professional sport record. This led to a ten-year Grey Cup drought. After a gap of ten years, Edmonton won the Grey Cup again in 2015, under the leadership of quarterback Mike Reilly.

In 2020 pressure mounted from team sponsors such as Belairdirect, Boston Pizza, and Sports Interaction, a First Nations–owned betting company, for the team to change their name. The term Eskimo is a term historically placed on Inuit. The team officially dropped all use of the word "Eskimo" from the team on July 21, 2020. In response, the team temporarily rebranded as the "Edmonton Football Team" or, secondarily, the "EE Football Team", confirming their plan was to rebrand with a nickname starting with "E" to continue the use of at least some of their branding, most notably the interlocked double-E logo. This move was supported by multiple Indigenous groups, including the Inuit Tapiriit Kanatami, a group representing over 60,000 Inuit across Canada. On June 1, 2021, the team formally announced that the new Edmonton team name would be the Edmonton Elks, a name used by the Edmonton football club of 1922.

2012–2015 uniform combinations as the Edmonton Eskimos

Franchise great Warren Moon, who led Edmonton to a record five straight Grey Cups between 1978 and 1982 stated, "The name Eskimos, to me, just means pride and it means winning with that organization". However, he stated that he was ultimately supportive of the move because some people might be offended by the name. Saying, "If this is something that is insensitive to another group of people, that is something I can understand being a minority myself." This came around the same time as the Washington Redskins of the National Football League rebranded as the Washington Commanders, and the Cleveland Indians of Major League Baseball rebranded as the Cleveland Guardians.

Elks secondary logo

In 2026, after a five season playoff drought which included a 22-game home losing streak from 2019 to 2023, a North American professional sports record, the Elks not only returned to the playoffs, but won their first championship since 2015 with a 37–30 win over the Montreal Alouettes in the 113th Grey Cup in Calgary. Quarterback Cody Fajardo, in his second season with the team, was named Grey Cup MVP, as the Elks claimed their 15th and most recent title.

In an interview after accepting his MVP trophy, Fajardo referred to Edmonton as the “City of Champions”, suggesting that the well-known sign at the edge of the city should be put back up. It had been removed by city council in 2015. By the next day, an anonymous fan had returned the sign to its former place.

==== Team colours and branding ====
The team colours, green and gold, have remained essentially the same over the years with only minor modifications to the uniform or logo until 2021, when the EE logo was designated as a secondary logo, and introduced a new logo of a stylized image of an elk and the Elks helmet logo was changed to antlers. After keeping the elk-antler helmet for the 2021 season, the team reintroduced the EE logo to their helmets (albeit with it not being enclosed in an oval) in the 2022 offseason, acknowledging fan favourability towards the logo.

Indigenous logo introduced in 2021 following the team rebrand

In 2021, the Elks worked with artist Izaiah Masuskapoe, an Indigenous student at West Edmonton’s St. Thomas More Catholic Junior High School, to create a special logo to celebrate the Indigenous people in Edmonton, which later spread to all of Canada in 2024 as the CFL commemorated the National Day of Truth and Reconciliation with logos of their own. This followed a similar effort by the BC Lions months before.

Following new private ownership, the EE logo returned as the primary logo in 2025 and the Elk logo was retained as the secondary logo.

=== Team records and achievements ===
With 15 Grey Cup wins, the franchise has won the Grey Cup more than any other team except the Toronto Argonauts, who have 19 wins. This includes more championships than any other team since the CFL was formed in the 1950s. Edmonton holds the record for most consecutive Grey Cup appearances (6 from 1977 to 1982), and consecutive wins (5 from 1978 to 1982). The team is the only one to have won three or more consecutive Grey Cups twice (1954–1956 and 1978–1982).

The Edmonton franchise holds the following CFL records:

- 5 consecutive Grey Cup wins: 1978–1982
- 6 consecutive Grey Cup appearances: 1977–1982
- 34 consecutive playoff appearances: 1972–2005
- 6 consecutive first place finishes, division: 1977–1982
- 12 consecutive home playoff victories: 1973–1987
- 14 consecutive seasons above .500: 1984–1997 (tied by Calgary 2008–2022)
- 13 consecutive seasons 10 or more wins: 1985–1997
- 16 wins, season: 1989 (tied by Toronto 2023)
- 0.906 winning pct., season (minimum 16-game season): 1981
- 14 games over .500, season: 1989 (tied by Toronto 2023)
- 9 home wins, season: 1989 (tied by several teams)
- 27 consecutive seasons .500 or better: 1972–1998
- 22 consecutive home losses: October 26, 2019 – August 10, 2023
- 22 consecutive winless home games: October 26, 2019 – August 10, 2023

The team has the distinction of setting two opposite North American professional sports records: from a success standpoint, Edmonton made the playoffs for 34 consecutive years from 1972 to 2005. At the other end, the Elks hold the dubious record of longest losing streak, home, and longest winless streak, home, set when they passed 21 on July 29, 2023. These streaks ended at 22, with the first home win under the Elks name coming August 27, 2023. This record was previously held by the 1953 St. Louis Browns.

The Elks have also led the CFL in yearly attendance many times. As of August 2016, Edmonton had the highest average attendance in the league 27 times since moving to Commonwealth Stadium in 1978.

Team alumni have figured prominently in Alberta political life: past players include two former provincial premiers (Peter Lougheed and Donald Getty), a former mayor of Edmonton (Bill Smith), and a lieutenant-governor (Norman Kwong). Athletes of significance in other professional sports that played for the Elks include professional wrestler and WWE champion Roman Reigns, who played under his birthname Joe Anoa'i in 2008.

== Ownership ==
The Edmonton Elks were a "community owned" team (owned by local shareholders) since their inception in 1949 to midway through the 2024 season.

Edmonton Elks Football Team, Inc., was governed by a ten-member board of directors. The board consisted of a chairman, treasurer, secretary, and seven directors. The club's president and CEO was Chris Presson until he was fired on November 22, 2021.

As of 2024, Larry Thompson, longtime Elks fan and shareholder, bought the team outright, becoming the first private owner in club history. Thompson died on September 25, 2025, and as of January 2026 his estate currently owns the team.

== Wall of Honour ==
The Edmonton Elks have a policy of honouring the players who have best represented the team on the field. The player's name, number and seasons played with the Edmonton Elks are displayed on the edge of the concrete separating the field level from the lower bowl of Commonwealth Stadium. The Elks keep most of the numbers in circulation rather than retire them from use. However, the team has had the numbers of Warren Moon (1), Don Warrington (21), and Rollie Miles (98) removed from circulation and are no longer issued.

=== Numbers so honoured as of 2023: ===
- 1 Warren Moon (2001)
- 2 Henry "Gizmo" Williams (2002)
- 3 Terry Vaughn (2023)
- 11 (Canada) Sean Fleming (2011)
- 12 Tom Wilkinson (1982)
- 13 Larry Highbaugh (1996)
- 14 (Canada) Oscar Kruger (1992)
- 15 Ricky Ray (2019)
- 22 Tom Scott (1993)
- 24 Johnny Bright (1983)
- 24 Ed Jones (2022)
- 25 Jim Germany (2022)
- 26 (Canada) Dave Cutler (1986)
- 27 (Canada) Don Getty (1992)
- 29 Joe Hollimon (2022)
- 30 Danny Bass (1992)
- 39 Willie Pless (2004)
- 42 Danny Kepley (1987)
- 47 (Canada) Larry Wruck (2011)
- 51 Frank "Guts" Anderson (Note: Honoured posthumously) (1985)
- 53 (Canada) Frank Morris (1984)
- 55 Ron Estay (2010)
- 60 (Canada) Chris Morris (2008)
- 62 (Canada) Bill Stevenson (2014)
- 63 (Canada) Hector Pothier (2014)
- 65 (Canada) Dave Fennell (1984)
- 66 Roger Nelson (1987)
- 66 John LaGrone (1988)
- 67 (Canada) Rod Connop (2005)
- 70 Brian Kelly (1989)
- 76 George McGowan (1985)
- 77 (Canada) Tommy Joe Coffey (1988)
- 91 Jackie Parker (1983)
- 95 (Canada) Norman Kwong (1984)
- 98 Rollie Miles (1983)

== Current roster ==
Edmonton Elks roster
**Quarterbacks**: 8 Taylor Powell; **Running backs**: 34 Isaiah Knight; 24 ShunDerrick Powell; 5 Justin Rankin; **Fullbacks**: 44 Skyler Griffith; **Receivers**: 18 Joshua Cephus; 80 Carter Kettyle; 3 Austin Mack; 82 Montrell Washington	**Offensive linemen**: 53 Brendan Bordner; 66 Joe Cooper; 65 Mark Korte; 68 Jordan Murray; 64 Carter O'Donnell; 63 Chris Pashula; 67 Coulter Woodmansey; **Defensive linemen**: 91 Jared Brinkman; 2 Malik Carney; 99 Silas Hubert; 96 Richard Jibunor; 97 Gavin Meyer; 40 Robbie Smith; 42 Noah Taylor	**Linebackers**: 45 Dariel Djabome; 43 Brock Mogensen; 49 Justin Pace; **Defensive backs**: 23 Tyshon Blackburn; 30 Tyrell Ford; 25 Chelen Garnes; 13 Kordell Jackson; 32 Leonard Johnson; 20 Kenny Logan Jr.; 9 Royce Metchie; 41 Terez Reid; 29 J. J. Ross; 16 Benjamin Sangmuah; 0 Kobe Williams; **Special teams**: 26 Vincent Blanchard K; 52 Luke Burton-Krahn LS; 35 Bradley Hladik LS; 10 Jake Julien P	**Pending Free Agents**: 58 Elijah Alston DL; 48 Nick Anderson LB; 79 Carmine Bastone DL; 4 Brandon Barlow DL; 57 David Beard OL; 93 Francis Bemiy DL; 47 D. K. Bonhomme DL; 69 Brett Boyko OL; 85 Jalon Calhoun WR; 62 Cam Carter OL; 92 Noah Curtis DL; 50 Joel Dublanko LB; 7 Cody Fajardo QB; 95 Tomari Fox DL; 61 Arvin Hosseini OL; 59 Nash Jones OL; 33 Jaaron Joseph DB; 11 Kaion Julien-Grant WR; 37 Isiah King LB; 22 Javon Leake RB/KR; 88 T. J. Luther WR; 81 Zach Mathis WR; 38 Eteva Mauga-Clements LB; 6 Brendan O'Leary-Orange WR; 46 Jacob Plamondon FB; 17 Joe Robustelli WR; 14 Cole Snyder QB; 27 Ladarius Tennison DB; 54 Tyron Vrede LB; 90 Jordan Williams DL; **1-game injured list** **6-game injured list** **Practice roster** **Suspended**: 63 Greg Eiland OL; 84 Odieu Hiliare WR; 94 Darien Newell DL; 51 Alex Raich LB
Italics indicate American player • **Bold** indicates Global player • 45 Active, 2 Reserve, 14 Injured, 10 Practice, 4 Suspended; Roster updated 2026-11-14 • Depth chart • Transactions • More CFL rosters

== Current coaching staff ==
Edmonton Elks staff
Front office: Owner – Deb Thompson; President and CEO – Chris Morris; General manager – Ed Hervey; Senior Assistant General Manager – Spencer Zimmerman; Direct of U.S. Scouting – Spencer Boehm; Direct of Canadian Scouting – Rich Massaro; Direct of Football Operations – Nick Pelletier; Football Operations Assistant – Nic Cross; Equipment Manager – Dan Rosnau; Head coaches: Head coach – Mark Kilam; Assistant Head Coach/Offensive Coordinator – Jordan Maksymic; Offensive coaches: Offensive Line and Run Game Coordinator – Stephen Sorrells; Running Backs – Jabari Arthur; Receivers – Jason Tucker	Defensive coaches: Defensive Coordinator and Linebackers – J. C. Sherritt; Defensive Line – Cedric Douglas; Defensive Backs – Aaron Grymes; Defensive Quality Control – Danny Nesbitt; Defensive Analyst – Anthony Vitale; Special teams coach: Special Teams Coach – Des Catellier; Strength and conditioning: Strength and Conditioning Specialist – Danelle Tucker; → Coaching staff → More CFL staffs

== Head coaches ==
- (Canada) Annis Stukus (1949–1952)
- Frank Filchock (1952)
- Darrell Royal (1953)
- Pop Ivy (1954–1957)
- Sam Lyle (1958)
- Eagle Keys (1959–1963)
- Neill Armstrong (1964–1969)
- Ray Jauch (1970–1976)
- Hugh Campbell (1977–1982)
- Pete Kettela (1983)
- Jackie Parker (1983–1987)
- Joe Faragalli (1987–1990)
- Ron Lancaster (1991–1997)
- Kay Stephenson (1998)
- Don Matthews (1999–2000)
- Tom Higgins (2001–2004)
- (Canada) Danny Maciocia (2005–2008)
- Richie Hall (2009–2010)
- Kavis Reed (2011–2013)
- Chris Jones (2014–2015)
- Jason Maas (2016–2019)
- Scott Milanovich (2020)
- (Mexico) Jaime Elizondo (2021)
- Chris Jones (2022–2024)
- Jarious Jackson (2024)
- (Canada) Mark Kilam (2025–present)

== General managers ==
- Al Anderson (1949–1956)
- Keith Rolfe (1957–1960)
- Joe Ryan (1960–1965)
- Vic Schwenk (1966)
- Norm Kimball (1966–1985)
- Hugh Campbell (1986–1996)
- Tom Higgins (1997–2004)
- Paul Jones (2005–2007)
- Danny Maciocia (2008–2010)
- Eric Tillman (2010–2012)
- Ed Hervey (2013–2016)
- Brock Sunderland (2017–2021)
- Chris Jones (2022–2024)
- Geroy Simon (2024)
- Ed Hervey (2025–present)

== CFL awards and trophies ==
Grey Cup

- 1954, 1955, 1956, 1975, 1978, 1979, 1980, 1981, 1982, 1987, 1993, 2003, 2005, 2015, 2026

N. J. Taylor Trophy^{[a]}

- 1952, 1954, 1955, 1956, 1960, 1973, 1974, 1975, 1977, 1978, 1979, 1980, 1981, 1982, 1986, 1987, 1990, 1993, 1996, 2002, 2003

Grey Cup MVP

- Dave Fennell (DT): 1978, 1982
- Tom Wilkinson (QB): 1978
- Warren Moon (QB): 1980, 1982
- Dale Potter (LB): 1980
- Damon Allen (QB): 1987, 1993
- Stewart Hill (DE): 1987
- Jason Tucker (WR): 2003
- Ricky Ray (QB): 2005
- Mike Reilly (QB): 2015

Dick Suderman Trophy

- Garry Lefebvre (DB): 1973
- Dave Cutler (K): 1975
- Angelo Santucci (RB): 1978
- Dale Potter (LB): 1980
- Neil Lumsden (RB): 1981
- Dave Fennell (DT): 1982
- Milson Jones (RB): 1987
- Sean Fleming (P/K): 1993
- Mike Maurer (FB): 2005
- Shamawd Chambers (WR): 2015

Most Outstanding Player Award

- Billy Vessels (RB): 1953
- Jackie Parker (QB/RB): 1957, 1958, 1960
- Johnny Bright (RB): 1959
- George McGowan (WR): 1973
- Tom Wilkinson (QB): 1974
- Warren Moon (QB): 1983
- Tracy Ham (QB): 1989
- Mike Reilly (QB): 2017

Most Outstanding Canadian Award

- Norman Kwong (RB): 1955, 1956
- Dave Fennell (DT): 1979
- Blake Marshall (FB): 1991
- Leroy Blugh (DE): 1996
- Kamau Peterson (WR): 2008
- Jerome Messam (RB): 2011

Most Outstanding Defensive Player Award

- Danny Kepley (LB): 1977, 1980, 1981
- Dave Fennell (DT): 1978
- James Parker (LB): 1982
- Danny Bass (LB): 1989
- Willie Pless (LB): 1992, 1994, 1995, 1996, 1997
- Elfrid Payton (DE): 2002
- J. C. Sherritt (LB): 2012

Most Outstanding Offensive Lineman Award

- Charlie Turner (OT): 1975
- Michael Wilson (OT): 1979, 1980
- Rod Connop (C): 1989

Most Outstanding Lineman Award^{[a]}

- Roger Nelson (OT): 1959
- John LaGrone (DT): 1969

Most Outstanding Rookie Award

- Brian Kelly (WR): 1979
- Shalon Baker (WR): 1995
- Dexter McCoil (LB): 2014
- Derel Walker (WR): 2015
- Nick Anderson (LB): 2024

Annis Stukus Trophy

- Ray Jauch: 1970
- Hugh Campbell: 1979
- Ron Lancaster: 1996
- Tom Higgins: 2003

Tom Pate Memorial Award

- David Boone (DE): 1982
- Hector Pothier (OT): 1988
- Rick Walters (SB): 2001
- Adarius Bowman (WR): 2017
- Ryan King (LS): 2018

Rogers Fans' Choice Award^{[a]}

- Ricky Ray (QB): 2003

^{a} Defunct

== Mascots ==
Punter (an anthropomorphic football) and Spike (an elk) are the mascots for the Edmonton Elks. They were introduced in 2004 and 2021, respectively. Nanook, a polar bear, was introduced in 1997, but was retired and replaced with Spike in 2021, coinciding with the rebranding. Following private ownership purchasing the team, Nanook was brought back in 2025 and Spike was retired.

== See also ==
- Edmonton Elks all-time records and statistics
- Canadian Football Hall of Fame
- Canadian football
- Comparison of Canadian and American football
- List of Canadian Football League seasons
