= List of Canadian Football League records (individual) =

This is a list of Canadian Football League regular season records that stand as of the end of the 2026 CFL season.

Italics indicate an active player.

== Games ==
Most games

- 408 – Lui Passaglia
- 394 – Bob Cameron
- 370 – Damon Allen
- 340 – Paul McCallum
- 329 – Anthony Calvillo
- 321 – Miles Gorrell
- 304 – Paul Osbaldiston
- 298 – Danny McManus
- 293 – Troy Westwood
- 288 – Ron Lancaster
- 288 – Leo Groenewegen

Most consecutive games

- 353 – Bob Cameron
- 279 – Troy Westwood
- 272 – Mark McLoughlin
- 268 – Roger Aldag
- 268 – Paul Osbaldiston

Most regular seasons played

- 25 – Lui Passaglia
- 24 – Paul McCallum
- 23 – Bob Cameron
- 23 – Damon Allen
- 22 – Eddie Emerson
- 20 – Hank Ilesic
- 20 – Anthony Calvillo
- 19 – Ron Lancaster
- 19 – Miles Gorrell
- 18 – Paul Osbaldiston
- 18 – Troy Westwood

== Touchdowns ==
Most touchdowns, career

- 147 – Milt Stegall (SB)
- 137 – George Reed (RB)
- 137 – Mike Pringle (RB)
- 117 – Allen Pitts (SB)
- 104 – Geroy Simon (SB)

Most touchdowns, one season

- 23 – Milt Stegall (2002)
- 22 – Cory Philpot (1995)
- 21 – Allen Pitts (1994)
- 21 – Zander Horvath (2026)
- 20 – Pat Abbruzzi (1956)
- 20 – Darrell K. Smith (1990)
- 20 – Blake Marshall (1991)
- 20 – Jon Volpe (1991)

Most touchdowns, one game

- 6 – Bob McNamara (October 13, 1956)
- 6 – Eddie James (September 28, 1932)
- 5 – Ernie Pitts (August 29, 1959)
- 5 – Ferd Burket (October 26, 1959)
- 5 – Earl Lunsford (September 2, 1962)
- 5 – Martin Patton (August 5, 1995)
- 5 – Eric Blount (September 15, 1995)

Most consecutive games with a touchdown

- 10 – Terry Evanshen (September 24, 1967 – August 11, 1968)
- 9 – Sean Millington (October 20, 2001 – July 26, 2002)
- 9 – Eugene Lewis (August 25, 2024 – June 6, 2025)
- 8 – Blake Marshall (July 12, 1991 – August 28, 1991)
- 8 – Jon Volpe (August 27, 1991 – October 12, 1991)
- 8 – Milt Stegall (August 1, 1997 – September 19, 1997)

Most rushing touchdowns, career

- 134 – George Reed
- 125 – Mike Pringle
- 93 – Damon Allen
- 78 – Normie Kwong
- 77 – Matt Dunigan

Most rushing touchdowns, one season

- 19 – Mike Pringle (2000)
- 18 – Gerry James (1957)
- 18 – Jim Germany (1981)
- 18 – Joe Smith (2007)
- 18 – Zander Horvath (2026)
- 17 – Pat Abbruzzi (1955)
- 17 – Pat Abbruzzi (1956)
- 17 – Larry Key (1981)
- 17 – Cory Philpot (1995)
- 17 – Tommy Stevens (2026)

Most rushing touchdowns, one game

- 5 – Earl Lunsford (September 2, 1962)
- 5 – Martin Patton (August 5, 1995)
- 4 – 23 times, most recently Zander Horvath (August 30, 2026)

Most receiving touchdowns, career

- 144 – Milt Stegall
- 117 – Allen Pitts
- 103 – Geroy Simon
- 97 – Brian Kelly
- 94 – Arland Bruce

Most receiving touchdowns, one season

- 23 – Milt Stegall (2002)
- 21 – Allen Pitts (1994)
- 20 – Darrell K. Smith (1990)
- 18 – Brian Kelly (1984)
- 18 – David Williams (1988)
- 18 – Gerald Alphin (1994)
- 18 – Chris Armstrong (1994)

Most receiving touchdowns, one season (Canadian record)

- 17 – Terry Evanshen (1967)
- 15 – Dave Sapunjis (1993)
- 14 – Tony Gabriel (1976)

Most receiving touchdowns, one game

- 5 – Ernie Pitts (August 29, 1959)
- 4 – 22 times, most recently Reggie Begelton (August 17, 2019)

Most total kick return touchdowns, career

- 31 – Henry Williams
- 16 – Janarion Grant
- 15 – Bashir Levingston
- 13 – Brandon Banks
- 12 – Earl Winfield
- 12 – Keith Stokes
- 12 – Mario Alford

Most total kick return touchdowns, one season

- 6 – Chris Williams (2012)
- 5 – Henry Williams (1987)
- 5 – Earl Winfield (1988)
- 5 – Henry Williams (1991)
- 5 – Bashir Levingston (2003)
- 5 – Bashir Levingston (2004)
- 5 – Keith Stokes (2004)

Most total kick return touchdowns, one game

- 2 – Many (Most recently Trey Vaval on August 1, 2025)

Most punt return touchdowns, career

- 26 – Henry Williams
- 12 – Janarion Grant
- 11 – Earl Winfield
- 9 – Keith Stokes
- 8 – Michael Clemons
- 8 – Jimmy Cunningham
- 8 – Bashir Levingston

Most punt return touchdowns, one season

- 5 – Henry Williams (1991)
- 5 – Chris Williams (2012)
- 4 – Henry Williams (1987)
- 4 – Earl Winfield (1988)
- 4 – Henry Williams (1993)
- 4 – Keith Stokes (2004)
- 4 – Brandon Banks (2015)
- 4 – Javon Leake (2023)

Most punt return touchdowns, one game

- 2 – Ted Toogood (September 16, 1950)
- 2 – Ron Howell (September 20, 1959)
- 2 – Henry Williams (June 27, 1987)
- 2 – Henry Williams (September 6, 1991)
- 2 – Earl Winfield (September 17, 1993)
- 2 – Henry Williams (November 7, 1993)
- 2 – Curtis Mayfield (September 5, 1999)
- 2 – Keith Stokes (August 2, 2002)
- 2 – Janarion Grant (August 8, 2019)
- 2 – Mario Alford (July 15, 2023)

Most kickoff return touchdowns, career

- 5 – Harvey Wylie
- 4 – Mario Alford
- 3 – Hal Patterson
- 3 – Larry Highbaugh
- 3 – Bashir Levingston
- 3 – Marcus Thigpen
- 3 – Janarion Grant
- 3 – DeVonte Dedmon

Most kickoff return touchdowns, one season

- 2 – Eric Blount (1998)
- 2 – Bashir Levingston (2003)
- 2 – Tony Miles (2003)
- 2 – Will Ford (2013)
- 2 – Kendial Lawrence (2014)
- 2 – Quincy McDuffie (2016)
- 2 – Chandler Worthy (2022)
- 2 – Mario Alford (2022)
- 2 – Trey Vaval (2025)
- 2 – Isaiah Wooden (2025)

Most kickoff return touchdowns, one game

- 1 – Many

Most missed field goal return touchdowns, career

- 5 – Brandon Banks
- 4 – Bashir Levingston
- 3 – Henry Williams
- 3 – Ezra Landry
- 3 – Marcus Thigpen
- 3 – Tyreik McAllister

Most missed field goal return touchdowns, one season

- 2 – Keith Stokes (2003)
- 2 – Ezra Landry (2004)
- 2 – Bashir Levingston (2004)
- 2 – Tim Maypray (2010)
- 2 – Chad Owens (2010)
- 2 – Marcus Thigpen (2010)
- 2 – Brandon Banks (2016)
- 2 – Brandon Banks (2019)
- 2 – Tyreik McAllister (2026)

Most missed field goal return touchdowns, one game

- 1 – Many

Most interception return touchdowns, career

- 9 – Byron Parker
- 8 – Dick Thornton
- 8 – Malcolm Frank
- 8 – Jason Goss
- 7 – Jovon Johnson

Most interception return touchdowns, one season

- 5 – Malcolm Frank (2004)
- 4 – Joe Hollimon (1978)
- 4 – Byron Parker (2006)
- 3 – Dick Thornton (1963)
- 3 – Ed Jones (1980)
- 3 – Keith Gooch (1989)
- 3 – William Hampton (1999)
- 3 – Vernon Mitchell (2000)
- 3 – Maurice Leggett (2016)

Most interception return touchdowns, one game

- 3 – Vernon Mitchell (October 7, 2000)
- 2 – Dick Thornton (August 23, 1963)
- 2 – Ed Jones (September 7, 1980)
- 2 – James Jefferson (October 4, 1987)
- 2 – Byron Parker (September 4, 2006)
- 2 – Dexter McCoil (August 23, 2014)
- 2 – Emanuel Davis (August 9, 2015)
- 2 – Damon Webb (September 7, 2024)

== Passing ==
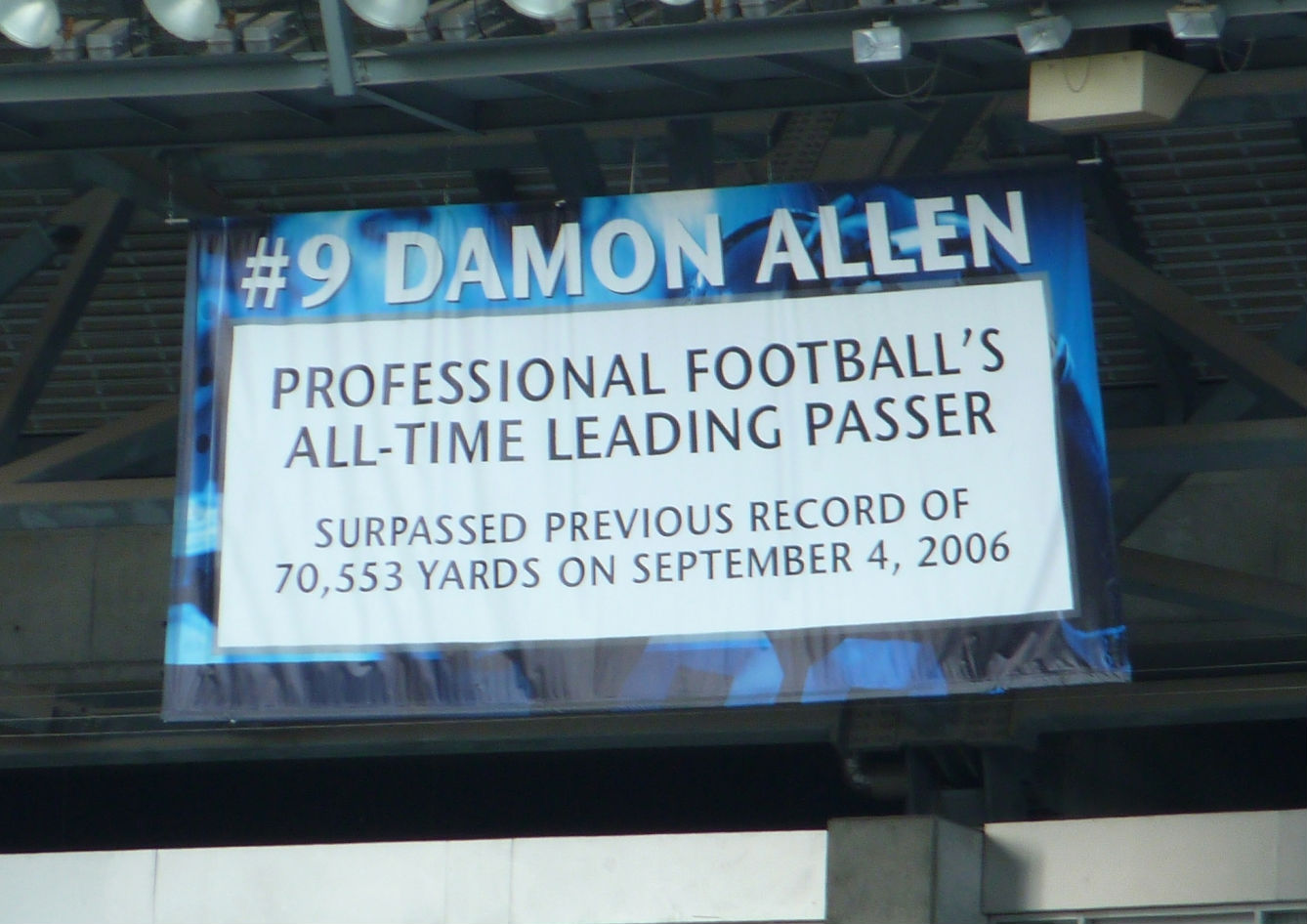
A banner hung in the Rogers Centre to commemorate Damon Allen breaking the all-time pro football career passing record in 2006. Anthony Calvillo subsequently passed Allen in 2011.

Most passing yards, career

- 79,816 – Anthony Calvillo
- 72,381 – Damon Allen (highest rank – #1)
- 63,369 – Henry Burris (highest rank – #3)
- 60,736 – Ricky Ray (highest rank – #4)
- 53,255 – Danny McManus (highest rank – #2)
- 52,867 – Kevin Glenn (highest rank – #6)
- 50,535 – Ron Lancaster (highest rank – #1)
- 45,426 – Bo Levi Mitchell (highest rank – #8)
- 43,857 – Matt Dunigan (highest rank – #2)
- 43,067 – Trevor Harris (highest rank – #10)

Most passing yards, one season

- 6,619 – Doug Flutie (1991)
- 6,225 – Kent Austin (1992)
- 6,092 – Doug Flutie (1993)
- 6,041 – Anthony Calvillo (2004)
- 6,023 – David Archer (1993)
- 5,945 – Doug Flutie (1992)
- 5,891 – Anthony Calvillo (2003)
- 5,830 – Michael Reilly (2017)
- 5,754 – Kent Austin (1993)
- 5,726 – Doug Flutie (1994)

Most passing yards, one season (Canadian Record)

- 5,290 – Nathan Rourke (2025)
- 4,614 – Nathan Rourke (2026)
- 3,641 – Russ Jackson (1969)
- 3,349 – Nathan Rourke (2022)
- 3,332 – Russ Jackson (1967)
- 3,187 – Russ Jackson (1968)
- 2,910 – Russ Jackson (1963)
- 2,892 – Gerry Dattilio (1980)

Most passing yards, consecutive seasons

- 12,564 – Doug Flutie (1991–1992)
- 12,037 – Doug Flutie (1992–1993)
- 11,979 – Kent Austin (1992–1993)
- 11,932 – Anthony Calvillo (2003–2004)
- 11,818 – Doug Flutie (1993–1994)

Most 5000-yard passing seasons

- 7 – Anthony Calvillo (2002–2005, 2008, 2011–2012)
- 6 – Doug Flutie (1991–1994, 1996–1997)
- 4 – Ricky Ray (2005–2006, 2008, 2017)
- 4 – Bo Levi Mitchell (2016, 2018, 2024–2025)
- 3 – Henry Burris (2008, 2012, 2015)
- 3 – Michael Reilly (2016–2018)

Most consecutive 5000-yard passing seasons

- 4 – Doug Flutie (1991–1994)
- 4 – Anthony Calvillo (2002–2005)
- 3 – Michael Reilly (2016–2018)

Most passing yards, one game

- 713 – Matt Dunigan (for Winnipeg vs Edmonton, July 14, 1994)
- 601 – Danny Barrett (for B.C. vs Toronto, Aug 12, 1993)**
- 586 – Sam Etcheverry (for Montreal vs Hamilton, Oct 16, 1954)**
- 582 – Doug Flutie (for B.C. vs Edmonton, Oct 12, 1991)
- 561 – Sam Etcheverry (for Montreal vs Hamilton, Sept 29, 1956)
- 558 – Kent Austin (for Saskatchewan vs B.C., Aug. 13, 1992 (OT))
- 556 – Doug Flutie (for Calgary vs Ottawa, Aug 6, 1993)
- 555 – Warren Moon (for Edmonton vs Montreal, Oct 15, 1983)
- 553 – Peter Liske (for Calgary vs Saskatchewan, Sept. 29, 1968)
- 551 – Anthony Calvillo (for Las Vegas vs Ottawa, Sept. 3, 1994)

**Former Record Holder

Most passing yards, one game (Canadian Record)

- 488 – Nathan Rourke (August 13, 2022)
- 477 – Nathan Rourke (August 6, 2022)
- 462 – Nathan Rourke (June 27, 2026)
- 436 – Nathan Rourke (June 25, 2022)

Most passing yards per game, career (minimum 1000 attempts)

- 306.3 – Doug Flutie
- 269.8 – Ricky Ray
- 264.9 – Michael Reilly
- 262.2 – Jeremiah Masoli
- 261.0 – Trevor Harris
- 249.0 – David Archer
- 243.4 – Kent Austin
- 242.9 - Nathan Rourke
- 242.6 – Anthony Calvillo
- 236.9 - Darian Durant

Most passing yards per game, one season

- 367.7 – Doug Flutie (1991)
- 360.6 – Matt Dunigan (1994)
- 356.5 – Kerwin Bell (1998)
- 353.0 – Warren Moon (1983)
- 345.8 – Kent Austin (1992)
- 338.5 – Kent Austin (1993)
- 338.4 – Doug Flutie (1993)
- 337.3 – Sam Etcheverry (1956)
- 335.6 – Anthony Calvillo (2004)
- 334.9 – Nathan Rourke (2022)

Most pass attempts, career

- 9,437 – Anthony Calvillo
- 9,138 – Damon Allen**
- 7,426 – Henry Burris
- 7,301 – Ricky Ray
- 6,689 – Danny McManus
- 6,434 – Kevin Glenn
- 6,233 – Ron Lancaster**
- 5,476 – Matt Dunigan
- 5,348 – Bo Levi Mitchell
- 4,974 – Trevor Harris

**Former Record Holder

Most pass attempts, one season

- 770 – Kent Austin (1992)
- 730 – Doug Flutie (1991)**
- 715 – Kent Austin (1993), Ricky Ray (2005)
- 703 – Doug Flutie (1993)
- 701 – David Archer (1993)
- 690 – Anthony Calvillo (2004)
- 688 – Doug Flutie (1992)
- 682 – Anthony Calvillo (2008)
- 678 – Henry Burris (2015)
- 677 – Doug Flutie (1996)

**Former Record Holder

Most pass attempts, one season (Canadian Record)

- 500 – Nathan Rourke (2025)
- 444 – Nathan Rourke (2026)
- 387 – Gerry Dattilio (1982)
- 358 – Russ Jackson (1969)

Most pass attempts, one game

- 65 – Kent Austin (1991)
- 64 – Anthony Calvillo (1995)
- 63 – Doug Flutie (1992)
- 62 – Joe Adams (1983)**, Kent Austin (1992), Darian Durant (2010)
- 60 – Kent Austin (1992)
- 59 – Marcus Crandell (2004)
- 58 – Matt Dunigan (1995), Dieter Brock (1984)
- 57 – Danny Barrett (1991), Damon Allen (1997)
- 56 – Tony Kimbrough (1992), Doug Flutie (1993), Ricky Ray (2005), Chad Kelly (2024)

**Former Record Holder

Most pass completions, career

- 5,892 – Anthony Calvillo
- 5,158 – Damon Allen**
- 4,976 – Ricky Ray
- 4,638 – Henry Burris
- 4,068 – Kevin Glenn
- 3,640 – Danny McManus
- 3,528 – Trevor Harris
- 3,508 – Bo Levi Mitchell
- 3,384 – Ron Lancaster**
- 3,057 – Matt Dunigan

**Former Record Holder

Most pass completions, one season

- 481 – Henry Burris (2015)
- 479 – Ricky Ray (2005)**
- 474 – Ricky Ray (2017)
- 472 – Anthony Calvillo (2008)
- 466 – Doug Flutie (1991)**
- 459 – Kent Austin (1992)
- 448 – Michael Reilly (2016)
- 447 – Michael Reilly (2017)
- 437 – Anthony Calvillo (2005)
- 434 – Doug Flutie (1996)

**Former Record Holder

Most pass completions, one season (Canadian Record)

- 352 – Nathan Rourke (2025)
- 313 – Nathan Rourke (2026)
- 255 – Nathan Rourke (2022)
- 194 – Gerry Dattilio (1982)

Most pass completions, one game

- 45 – Henry Burris (Oct 1, 2015)
- 44 – Anthony Calvillo (Oct 4, 2008)**, Trevor Harris (Aug 11, 2018)
- 41 – Dieter Brock (Oct 3, 1981)**, Kent Austin (Oct 31, 1993)
- 40 – Kent Austin (Aug 13, 1992), Ricky Ray (Jul 24, 2017)
- 39 – Kent Austin (Jul 8, 1992)
- 39 – Khari Jones (Sept 27, 2002)
- 39 – Ricky Ray (Oct 24, 2013)
- 39 – Trevor Harris (Jul 8, 2016)
- 39 – Nathan Rourke (Jun 25, 2022)
- 39 – Nathan Rourke (Aug 13, 2022)

**Former Record Holder

Most pass completions by a backup, one game

- 34 – Jarret Doege (Oct 4, 2025)
- 30 – Taylor Powell (Aug 10, 2024)
- 28 – Joe Barnes (Oct 2, 1983)
- 27 – Todd Dillon (Aug 3, 1990)
- 27 – Nick Arbuckle (Oct 16, 2026)

Most consecutive pass completions, one game

- 23 – Jeremiah Masoli (2016)
- 22 – Jason Maas (2004)**
- 22 – Cody Fajardo (2025)
- 21 – Ricky Ray (2013)
- 20 – Ricky Ray (2009)*
- 19 – Matt Nichols (2019)
- 19 – Dane Evans (2019)
- 18 – Joe Paopao (1979)**
- 18 – Henry Burris (2015)
- 18 – Bo Levi Mitchell (2024)
- 18 – Trevor Harris (2025)

*Longest streak to start a game **Former Record Holder

Most consecutive pass attempts without an interception

- 356 – Davis Alexander – (July 17, 2025 to July 26, 2026)
- 323 – Darian Durant – (July 26, 2014 to Aug 20, 2016)
- 299 – Vernon Adams Jr. – (Oct 11, 2025 to Aug 6, 2026)
- 247 – Ricky Ray – (Oct 27, 2012 to Oct 14, 2013)
- 236 – Kevin Glenn – (July 13, 2007 to Sept 9, 2007)
- 235 – Dave Dickenson – (July 14, 2000 to Sept 22, 2000)
- 228 – Trevor Harris (Oct 18, 2018 to July 20, 2019)
- 224 – Michael Reilly (Oct 10, 2016 to July 28, 2017)
- 213 – Darian Durant – (Oct 27, 2012 to Sept 1, 2013)
- 211 – Ricky Ray – (Oct 19, 2013 to July 18, 2014)

Most passing touchdowns, career

- 455 – Anthony Calvillo
- 394 – Damon Allen**
- 373 – Henry Burris
- 333 – Ron Lancaster**
- 324 – Ricky Ray
- 303 – Matt Dunigan
- 293 – Kevin Glenn
- 284 – Tracy Ham
- 271 – Bo Levi Mitchell
- 270 – Doug Flutie

**Former Record Holder

Most passing touchdowns, one season

- 48 – Doug Flutie (1994)
- 47 – Doug Flutie (1997)
- 46 – Khari Jones (2002)
- 44 – Doug Flutie (1993)**
- 43 – Anthony Calvillo (2008), Henry Burris (2012)
- 40 – Peter Liske (1967)**
- 39 – Henry Burris (2008)
- 38 – Tobin Rote (1960)**, Doug Flutie (1991), Henry Burris (2010)
- 37 – Anthony Calvillo (2003), Zach Collaros (2022)
- 36 – Warren Moon (1982), Tracy Ham (1990), Matt Dunigan (1993), Dave Dickenson (2000, 2003), Bo Levi Mitchell (2025), Vernon Adams (2026)

**Former Record Holder

Most passing touchdowns, one season (Canadian Record)

- 33 – Russ Jackson (1969)
- 31 – Nathan Rourke (2025)
- 25 – Russ Jackson (1967)
- 25 – Russ Jackson (1968)
- 25 – Nathan Rourke (2022)

Most passing touchdowns, one game

- 8 – Joe Zuger (1962)
- 7 – Jim Van Pelt (1959)
- 7 – Tobin Rote (1960)
- 7 – Tobin Rote (1960)
- 7 – Rickey Foggie (1990)
- 6 – 14 players, most recently by Vernon Adams Jr. (2026)

Most consecutive regular season games with a touchdown pass

- 34 – Sam Etcheverry (1954–56)
- 26 – Travis Lulay (2011–12)
- 23 – Anthony Calvillo (2012–13)
- 21 – Doug Flutie (1996–97)
- 21 – Anthony Calvillo (2008–09)
- 21 – Michael Reilly (2017–18)
- 19 – Bo Levi Mitchell (2015–16)
- 18 – Khari Jones (2001–02)
- 17 – Kent Austin (1993–94)
- 16 – Doug Flutie (1994–95)
- 16 – Matt Dunigan (1994–95)

Most passing interceptions, career

- 396 – Ron Lancaster
- 281 – Danny McManus
- 278 – Damon Allen
- 227 – Henry Burris
- 224 – Anthony Calvillo
- 214 – Tom Clements
- 213 – Sam Etcheverry
- 211 – Matt Dunigan
- 207 – Kevin Glenn
- 201 – Bernie Faloney

Highest pass completion percentage, career (minimum 1000 attempts)

- 71.07 – Nathan Rourke
- 70.99 – Cody Fajardo
- 70.93 – Trevor Harris
- 69.66 – Nick Arbuckle
- 69.00 – Chad Kelly
- 68.54 – Dane Evans
- 68.40 – Dru Brown
- 68.22 – Ricky Ray
- 68.16 – Jake Maier
- 68.15 – Zach Collaros

Highest pass completion percentage, one season (minimum 250 attempts)

- 78.70 – Nathan Rourke (2022)
- 77.23 – Ricky Ray (2013)
- 74.73 – Jake Maier (2022)
- 74.50 – Ricky Ray (2016)
- 73.98 – Dave Dickenson (2005)
- 73.63 – Cody Fajardo (2024)
- 73.58 – Trevor Harris (2025)
- 73.33 – Trevor Harris (2016)
- 73.25 – Cody Fajardo (2025)
- 72.57 – Zach Collaros (2025)

Highest pass completion percentage, one game (minimum 20 attempts)

- 95.0 – Ricky Ray (2013) (19/20)
- 92.0 – Ricky Ray (2008) (23/25)
- 91.9 – Nathan Rourke (2022) (34/37)
- 91.7 – Jake Maier (2023) (22/24)
- 90.9 – Casey Printers (2004) (20/22)
- 90.9 – Bo Levi Mitchell (2018) (20/22)
- 90.5 – Tom Wilkinson (1974) (19/21)
- 90.5 – Danny McManus (1999) (19/21)
- 90.3 – Trevor Harris (2016) (28/31)
- 90.0 – Jason Maas (2004) (27/30)
- 90.0 – Henry Burris (2012) (27/30)

Highest passer efficiency rating, career (minimum 1000 attempts)

- 110.39 – Dave Dickenson
- 108.48 – Nathan Rourke
- 103.87 – Trevor Harris
- 103.13 – Chad Kelly
- 101.50 – Vernon Adams
- 100.49 – Zach Collaros
- 100.44 – Cody Fajardo
- 98.98 – Bo Levi Mitchell
- 98.44 – Ricky Ray
- 97.13 – Michael Reilly

Highest passer efficiency rating, one season (minimum 250 attempts)

- 126.37 – Ricky Ray (2013)
- 123.60 – Nathan Rourke (2022)
- 122.71 – Davis Alexander (2026)
- 118.77 – Dave Dickenson (2005)
- 116.20 – Zach Collaros (2022)
- 115.98 – Trevor Harris (2016)
- 115.01 – Casey Printers (2004)
- 114.12 – Dave Dickenson (2000)
- 113.69 – Zach Collaros (2015)
- 112.79 – Zach Collaros (2023)

Best touchdown to interception ratio, one season (minimum 20 TDs)

- 10.50 – Ricky Ray (2013) (21/2)
- 8.75 – Davis Alexander (2026) (35/4)
- 6.00 – Dave Dickenson (2000) (36/6)
- 6.00 – Vernon Adams (2026) (36/6)
- 5.40 – Anthony Calvillo (2000) (27/5)
- 4.57 – Anthony Calvillo (2010) (32/7)
- 4.33 – Anthony Calvillo (2009) (26/6)
- 4.20 – Dave Dickenson (2005) (21/5)
- 4.00 – Anthony Calvillo (2011) (32/8)
- 4.00 – Bo Levi Mitchell (2016) (32/8)

Lowest interception rate, one season (minimum 250 attempts)

- 0.66% – Ricky Ray (2013) (303 attempts, 2 interceptions)
- 0.76% – Davis Alexander (2026) (527 attempts, 4 interceptions)
- 1.09% – Anthony Calvillo (2009) (550 attempts, 6 interceptions)
- 1.14% – Danny Barrett (1991) (438 attempts, 5 interceptions)
- 1.15% – Anthony Calvillo (2010) (562 attempts, 7 interceptions)
- 1.17% – Vernon Adams (2026) (515 attempts, 6 interceptions)
- 1.21% – Trevor Harris (2016)
- 1.22% – Dave Dickenson (2000)
- 1.22% – Anthony Calvillo (2010)
- 1.24% – Anthony Calvillo (2009)

Highest touchdown rate, one season (minimum 250 attempts)

- 10.33% – Jim Van Pelt (1959) (300 attempts, 31 touchdown passes)
- 9.30% – Jack Jacobs (1951) (355 attempts, 33 touchdown passes)
- 8.49% – Zach Collaros (2022) (436 attempts, 37 touchdown passes)
- 8.44% – Tobin Rote (1960) (450 attempts, 38 touchdown passes)
- 7.82% – Zach Collaros (2023) (422 attempts, 33 touchdown passes)
- 7.72% – Nathan Rourke (2022)
- 7.55% – Warren Moon (1980)
- 7.50% – Sam Etcheverry (1955)
- 7.42% – Khari Jones (2002)
- 7.30% – Dave Dickenson (2000)

== Receiving ==
Most receiving yards, career

- 16,352 – Geroy Simon
- 15,153 – Milt Stegall
- 14,891 – Allen Pitts
- 14,359 – Darren Flutie
- 13,778 – Nik Lewis
- 13,746 – Terry Vaughn
- 13,301 – Ben Cahoon
- 13,198 – Ray Elgaard
- 12,366 – Don Narcisse
- 12,014 – Derrell Mitchell

Most receiving yards, one season

- 2,036 – Allen Pitts (1994)
- 2,003 – Terry Greer (1983)
- 2,000 – Derrell Mitchell (1998)
- 1,914 – Hal Patterson (1956)
- 1,862 – Milt Stegall (2002)
- 1,856 – Geroy Simon (2006)
- 1,826 – Darrell K. Smith (1990)
- 1,812 – Brian Kelly (1983)
- 1,809 – Tyson Philpot (2026)
- 1,777 – Jamel Richardson (2011)
- 1,764 – Allen Pitts (1991)

Most receiving yards, one season (Canadian Record)

- 1,809 – Tyson Philpot (2026)
- 1,662 – Terry Evanshen (1967)
- 1,655 – Dave Sapunjis (1995)
- 1,624 – Gerald Wilcox (1994)

Most receiving yards, one game

- 338 – Hal Patterson (1956)
- 319 – Curtis Mayfield (1994)
- 308 – Alfred Jackson (1994)
- 275 – Terry Vaughn (1999)
- 275 – Larry Thompson (1995)

Highest yards per catch average, one season

- 26.5 – Milt Stegall (1997)
- 25.0 – Margene Adkins (1969)
- 24.4 – Jason Tucker (2004)
- 23.9 – Brian Kelly (1987)
- 23.4 – Tommy Grant (1964)

Most pass receptions, career

- 1051 – Nik Lewis
- 1029 – Geroy Simon
- 1017 – Ben Cahoon
- 1006 – Terry Vaughn
- 972 – Darren Flutie

Most pass receptions, one season

- 160 – Derrell Mitchell (1998)
- 126 – Allen Pitts (1994)
- 124 – Tyson Philpot (2026)
- 123 – Don Narcisse (1995)
- 122 – Michael Clemons (1997)
- 120 – Adarius Bowman (2016)
- 118 – Allen Pitts (1991)
- 116 – James Murphy (1986)
- 116 – Mike Clemons (1996)
- 116 – Brad Sinopoli (2018)
- 113 – Terry Greer (1983)

Most pass receptions, one game

- 16 – Terry Greer (1983)
- 16 – Brian Wiggins (1993)
- 16 – Derrell Mitchell (1998)
- 16 – Arland Bruce (2010)
- 15 – George McGowan (1973)
- 15 – Eugene Goodlow (1981)
- 15 – Terry Greer (1982)
- 15 – Don Narcisse (1993)
- 15 – Darren Flutie (1997)
- 15 – Michael Clemons (1997)
- 15 – Andy Fantuz (2016)

Most 1,000+ pass receiving yard seasons, career

- 11 – Terry Vaughn
- 10 – Milt Stegall
- 10 – Nik Lewis
- 9 – Ben Cahoon
- 9 – Allen Pitts
- 9 – Darren Flutie
- 9 – Geroy Simon

== Rushing ==
Most rushing yards, career

- 16,425 – Mike Pringle
- 16,116 – George Reed**
- 11,920 – Damon Allen
- 10,909 – Johnny Bright**
- 10,380 – Andrew Harris
- 10,285 – Charles Roberts
- 9,340 – Kelvin Anderson
- 9,213 – Joffrey Reynolds
- 9,022 – Normie Kwong
- 8,861 – Leo Lewis

**Former Record Holder

Most rushing yards, one season

- 2,065 – Mike Pringle (1998)
- 1,972 – Mike Pringle (1994)**
- 1,896 – Willie Burden (1975)**
- 1,813 – Jon Cornish (2013)
- 1,794 – Earl Lunsford (1961)**
- 1,791 – Mike Pringle (1995)
- 1,778 – Mike Pringle (2000)
- 1,775 – Mike Pringle (1997)
- 1,769 – Robert Mimbs (1991)
- 1,768 – George Reed (1965)

**Former Record Holder

Most rushing yards by a Canadian, career

- 10,380 – Andrew Harris
- 9,022 – Normie Kwong
- 6,973 – Brady Oliveira
- 6,844 – Jon Cornish
- 6,086 – Sean Millington
- 5,690 – Ron Stewart
- 5,689 – Jerome Messam
- 5,554 – Gerry James
- 5,122 – Russ Jackson
- 4,930 – Milson Jones

Most rushing yards by a Canadian, one season (all 1,000 yard rushers included)

- 1,813 – Jon Cornish (2013)
- 1,534 – Brady Oliveira (2023)
- 1,493 – Brady Oliveira (2026)
- 1,457 – Jon Cornish (2012)
- 1,437 – Normie Kwong (1956)
- 1,390 – Andrew Harris (2018)
- 1,380 – Andrew Harris (2019)
- 1,353 – Brady Oliveira (2024)
- 1,250 – Normie Kwong (1955)
- 1,205 – Gerry James (1955)
- 1,198 – Jerome Messam (2016)
- 1,192 – Gerry James (1957)
- 1,163 – Brady Oliveira (2025)
- 1,112 – Andrew Harris (2012)
- 1,082 – Jon Cornish (2014)
- 1,075 – Orville Lee (1988)
- 1,057 – Jerome Messam (2011)
- 1,054 – Bob Swift (1964)
- 1,050 – Normie Kwong (1957)
- 1,039 – Andrew Harris (2015)
- 1,035 – Andrew Harris (2017)
- 1,033 – Normie Kwong (1958)
- 1,020 – Ron Stewart (1960)
- 1,016 – Jerome Messam (2017)
- 1,010 – Sean Millington (2000)
- 1,006 – Jerome Messam (2015)
- 1,001 – Brady Oliveira (2022)

Most rushing yards, by a quarterback, one season

- 1,096 – Tracy Ham (1990)
- 1,036 – Damon Allen (1991)
- 1,006 – Kerry Joseph (2005)
- 1,005 – Tracy Ham (1989)**
- 998 – Tracy Ham (1991)
- 928 – Ken Hobart (1985)**
- 920 – Damon Allen (1993)
- 878 – Nealon Greene (1999)
- 850 – Damon Allen (1992)
- 837 – Damon Allen (1997)

**Former Record Holder

Most rushing yards, one game

- 287 – Ron Stewart (1960)
- 268 – George Reed (1965)
- 260 – Fred Reid (2009)
- 249 – Blaise Bryant (1994)
- 238 – Lovell Coleman (1964)
- 238 – Willie Burden (1975)

Most rush attempts, career

- 3243 – George Reed
- 2962 – Mike Pringle
- 1969 – Johnny Bright
- 1952 – Andrew Harris
- 1918 – Charles Roberts

Most rush attempts, one season

- 347 – Mike Pringle (1998)
- 332 – Willie Burden (1975)
- 326 – Robert Mimbs (1991)
- 324 – Troy Davis (2004)
- 324 – Mike Pringle (2000)

Most rush attempts, one game

- 37 – Doyle Orange (1975)
- 36 – Lovell Coleman (1963)
- 34 – George Reed (1970)
- 34 – George Reed (1975)
- 34 – Willie Burden (1975)
- 34 – Blaise Bryant (1994)

Most 1,000+ rushing yard seasons, career

- 11 – George Reed
- 9 – Mike Pringle
- 8 – Kelvin Anderson
- 6 – Charles Roberts
- 6 – Joffrey Reynolds

Most 100+ rushing yard games, career

- 70 – Mike Pringle
- 66 – George Reed
- 38 – Charles Roberts
- 36 – Johnny Bright
- 30 – Dave Thelen

Most 100+ rushing yard games, career (Canadian Record)

- 29 – Andrew Harris
- 29 – Brady Oliveira
- 22 – Jon Cornish
- 18 – Norman Kwong

Most 100+ rushing yard games, season

- 14 – Mike Pringle (1998)
- 10 – Willie Burden (1975)
- 10 – Willard Reaves (1984)
- 10 – Robert Mimbs (1991)
- 9 – Six players, six times

== Yards from scrimmage ==
Most yards from scrimmage, career

- 20,255 – Mike Pringle (16,425 yards rushing, 3,830 yards receiving)
- 18,888 – George Reed (16,116 yards rushing, 2,772 yards receiving)
- 16,546 – Geroy Simon (194 yards rushing, 16,352 yards receiving)
- 15,869 – Andrew Harris (10,380 rushing, 5,489 yards receiving)
- 15,208 – Milt Stegall (55 yards rushing, 15,153 yards receiving)

Most yards from scrimmage, one season

- 2,414 – Mike Pringle (1994, 1,972 yards rushing, 442 yards receiving)
- 2,414 – Mike Pringle (1998, 2,065 yards rushing, 349 yards receiving)
- 2,207 – Robert Mimbs (1991, 1769 yards rushing, 438 yards receiving)
- 2,157 – Jon Cornish (2013, 1,813 yards rushing, 344 yards receiving)
- 2,140 – Willard Reaves (1984, 1,733 yards rushing, 407 yards receiving)

Most yards from scrimmage, one game

- 338 – Hal Patterson (1956, 338 yards receiving)
- 319 – Dick Smith (1969, 145 yards rushing, 174 yards receiving)
- 319 – Curtis Mayfield (1994, 319 yards receiving)
- 308 – Alfred Jackson (1994, 308 yards receiving)
- 299 – Ed Buchanan (1964, 198 yards rushing, 101 yards receiving)

Most yards from scrimmage by a Canadian, career

- 15,869 – Andrew Harris (10,380 rushing, 5,489 receiving)
- 13,368 – Ben Cahoon (67 rushing, 13,301 receiving)
- 13,289 – Ray Elgaard (91 rushing, 13,198 receiving)
- 10,098 – Jim Young (850 rushing, 9,248 receiving)
- 9,925 – Normie Kwong (9,022 rushing, 903 receiving)

Most yards from scrimmage by a Canadian, one season

- 2,157 – Jon Cornish (2013, 1,813 rushing, 344 receiving)
- 2,016 – Brady Oliveira (2023, 1,534 rushing, 482 receiving)
- 1,909 – Andrew Harris (2019, 1,380 rushing, 529 receiving)
- 1,892 – Andrew Harris (2017, 1,035 rushing, 857 receiving)
- 1,841 – Andrew Harris (2018, 1,390 rushing, 451 receiving)
- 1,841 – Brady Oliveira (2026, 1,493 rushing, 348 receiving)

== Interceptions ==
Most interceptions, career

- 87 – Less Browne
- 66 – Barron Miles
- 66 – Larry Highbaugh
- 62 – Terry Irvin
- 61 – Don Wilson

Most interceptions, one season

- 15 – Al Brenner (1972)
- 14 – Less Browne (1990)
- 13 – Roy Bennett (1987)
- 12 – Larry Crawford (1983)
- 12 – Gerald Bess (1984)
- 12 – Paul Bennett (1985)
- 12 – Less Browne (1985)
- 12 – Terry Irvin (1986)
- 12 – Rod Hill (1989)
- 12 – Rod Hill (1990)
- 12 – Ryan Phillips (2007)

Most interceptions, one game

- 5 – Rod Hill (for Winnipeg vs Hamilton, September 9, 1990)
- 4 – Don Sutherin (for Hamilton vs Edmonton, September 11, 1961)
- 4 – Art Johnson (for Toronto vs Montreal, October 7, 1961)
- 4 – Peter Ribbins (for Winnipeg vs BC, August 17, 1972)
- 4 – Al Brenner (for Hamilton vs Toronto, November 5, 1972)
- 4 – Chris Sigler (for Montreal vs Ottawa, June 27, 1986)
- 4 – Less Browne (for Hamilton vs Montreal, August 21, 1986)
- 4 – Terry Irvin (for Montreal vs Toronto, November 2, 1986)
- 4 – Ed Gainey (for Saskatchewan vs BC, August 13, 2017)

Most interception return yards, career

- 1,508 – Less Browne
- 1,178 – Orlondo Steinauer
- 1,067 – Harry Skipper
- 1,046 – Don Wilson
- 1,004 – Paul Bennett

Most interception return yards, one season

- 348 – Byron Parker (2006)
- 300 – Robert Grant (2003)
- 299 – Ryan Phillips (2007)
- 273 – Less Browne (1990)
- 267 – Less Browne (1991)

Most interception return yards, one game

- 172 – Barry Ardern (1969)
- 170 – Robertson Daniel (2023)
- 144 – Jason Goss (2008)
- 138 – Jackie Kellogg (2000)
- 135 – Lewis Cook (1972)
- 135 – Byron Parker (2006)

Longest interception return

- 120 – Neal Beaumont (1963)
- 119 – Lewis Porter (1973)
- 118 – Dickie Harris (1972)
- 117 – Keon Raymond (2011)
- 115 – Charlie Brown (1969)
- 115 – Eric Harris (1977)
- 115 – Melvin Byrd (1984)

== Pass knockdowns (recorded since 1994) ==
Most pass knockdowns, career

- 111 – Eddie Davis
- 106 – Willie Jefferson
- 105 – Adrion Smith
- 79 – Shannon Garrett
- 77 – Jovon Johnson

Most pass knockdowns, one season

- 18 – Malcolm Frank (1994)
- 18 – Adrion Smith (1996)
- 17 – Jamar Wall (2016)
- 16 – Charles Gordon (1994)
- 16 – Willie Jefferson (2019)
- 16 – Willie Jefferson (2025)

Most pass knockdowns, one game

- 5 – Emanuel Martin (June 28, 1995)
- 5 – Kavis Reed (July 31, 1997)
- 5 – Davis Sanchez (September 14, 2003)

== Quarterback sacks ==
Most quarterback sacks, career

- 157.0 – Grover Covington
- 154.0 – Elfrid Payton
- 142.0 – Bobby Jurasin
- 139.5 – James Parker
- 136.0 – Charleston Hughes

Most quarterback sacks, one season

- 26.5 – James Parker (1984)
- 26.0 – Joe Montford (1999)
- 25.0 – Grover Covington (1988)
- 24.0 – Tim Cofield (1995)
- 23.0 – Gregg Stumon (1987)
- 23.0 – Cameron Wake (2008)

Most quarterback sacks, one game

- 5.0 – Mack Moore (1982)
- 5.0 – Rodney Harding (1988)
- 5.0 – Tim Cofield (1993)
- 5.0 – Daved Benefield (1995)
- 5.0 – Tim Cofield (1995)
- 5.0 – Neal Smith (1999)
- 5.0 – Elfrid Payton (1999)
- 5.0 – Duane Butler (2003)
- 5.0 – Scott Deibert (2003)
- 5.0 – Tim Gilligan (2004)
- 5.0 – Anthony Collier (2005)

== Tackles (recorded since 1987) ==
Most defensive tackles, career

- 1241 – Willie Pless
- 1151 – Mike O'Shea
- 1095 – Alondra Johnson
- 979 – Chip Cox
- 955 – Barrin Simpson

Most defensive tackles, one season

- 144 – Solomon Elimimian (2017)
- 143 – Solomon Elimimian (2014)
- 134 – Micah Awe (2023)
- 130 – J. C. Sherritt (2012)
- 129 – Solomon Elimimian (2016)

Most defensive tackles, one game

- 17 – Simoni Lawrence (Sept 27, 2019)
- 16 – Reggie Hunt (July 10, 2003)
- 16 – Robertson Daniel (August 5, 2023)
- 15 – Calvin Tiggle (Aug 19, 1999)
- 15 – Solomon Elimimian (July 6, 2017)
- 14 – Bruce Holmes (Oct 15, 1989)
- 14 – Jeff Braswell (Oct 31, 1992)
- 14 – Markeith Knowlton (June 26, 2008)
- 14 – Barrin Simpson (July 24, 2009)
- 14 – Ian Wild (Aug 22, 2014)
- 14 – Solomon Elimimian (Aug 31, 2016)
- 14 – Avery Williams (Aug 7, 2021)
- 14 – Tyler Richardson (July 12, 2025)

Most tackles for a loss, one game

- 6 – K. D. Williams, 19 yards (1995)
- 4 – Brian Hilk, 12 yards (1991)
- 3 – Stewart Hill, 22 yards (1991)

Most special teams tackles, career

- 226 – Mike Miller
- 190 – Jason Arakgi
- 184 – Wade Miller
- 176 – Brendan Rogers
- 176 – Sean Millington

Most special teams tackles, one season

- 37 – Wade Miller (1994)
- 37 – Dylan Barker (2009)
- 35 – Donovan Gans (1995)
- 35 – Wade Miller (1997)
- 35 – Maven Maurer (2001)
- 35 – Rocky Henry (1999)
- 35 – Jason Arakgi (2009)

Most special teams tackles, one game

- 7 – Paul Clatney (July 11, 1991)
- 7 – Terry Wright (Sept 14, 1991)
- 7 – Brendan Rogers (Sept 23, 1994)
- 7 – Norman Bradford (Sept 10, 1995)
- 7 – Donovan Gans (Sept 24, 1995)
- 7 – Darren Joseph (Oct 13, 2003)
- 7 – Mike Miller (July 5, 2019)
- 7 – Alexandre Gagné (June 6, 2025)

== Blocked kicks ==
Most blocked kicks, career

- 13 – Barron Miles
- 12 – Gerald Vaughn
- 8 – Rod Hill
- 8 – Less Browne
- 7 – James Zachery
- 7 – Scott Flagel

Most blocked kicks, one season

- 5 – James Zachery (1986)
- 4 – Matt Goodwin (1994)
- 4 – Gerald Vaughn (2000)
- 3 – Several players (Most recently Scott Gordon in 2005)

Most blocked kicks, one game

- 2 – Ken Lehmann (Aug 23, 1967)
- 2 – Allen Ray Aldridge (Aug 25, 1968)
- 2 – John Vilunas (Sept 23, 1970)
- 2 – Donnie Thomas (Aug 30, 1970)
- 2 – Dave Chaytors (Oct 17, 1999)
- 2 – Markus Howell (Aug 10, 2000)
- 2 – Daved Benefield (Aug 17, 2000)
- 2 – Gerald Vaughn (Oct 8, 2001)
- 2 – Donnavan Carter (Oct 26, 2002)

== Kickoffs ==
Most kickoff yards, career

- 80,124 – Mark McLoughlin (1988–2005)
- 74,093 – Troy Westwood (1991–2009)
- 71,423 – Paul Osbaldiston (1986–2003)
- 69,991 – Sean Fleming (1992–2007)
- 68,432 – Paul McCallum (1993–2016)

Most kickoff yards, season

- 8,279 – Damon Duval (2009)
- 6,650 – Mike Vanderjagt (1997)
- 6,615 – Sandro DeAngelis (2009)
- 6,510 – Rob Maver (2010)
- 6,502 – Mark McLoughlin (1994)

Most kickoff yards, game

- 749 – Hank Ilesic versus BC Lions, July 16, 1992
- 732 – Jamie Boreham at Winnipeg Blue Bombers, September 13, 2009
- 727 – Damon Duval at Toronto Argonauts, November 7, 2009

Most kickoffs, career

- 1,370 – Mark McLoughlin (1988–2005)
- 1,291 – Troy Westwood (1991–2009)
- 1,253 – Paul Osbaldiston (1986–2003)
- 1,200 – Lui Passaglia (1975–2000)
- 1,192 – Sean Fleming (1992–2007)

Most kickoffs, season

- 130 – Damon Duval (2009)
- 113 – Mike Vanderjagt (1997)
- 112 – Mark McLoughlin (1990)
- 111 – Mark McLoughlin (1991)

Most kickoffs, game

- 12 – Lance Chomyc versus BC Lions, September 1, 1990
- 12 – Hank Ilesic versus BC Lions, July 16, 1992
- 11 – Nine times, most recently Richie Leone versus Saskatchewan Roughriders, October 3, 2015

Longest kickoff Prior to 2022 rule change

- 100 – Paul Osbaldiston at Saskatchewan Roughriders, July 26, 1991
- 100 – Paul McCallum at Sacramento Gold Miners, September 2, 1994

Since 2022 rule change

- 100 – many players, most by Boris Bede (four times)

Highest kickoff average, career (Minimum 150 attempts)

- 69.4 – Boris Bede (2015–2024)
- 65.6 – Swayze Waters (2012–2017)
- 64.6 – Sergio Castillo (2015–2026)
- 64.4 – Ricky Schmitt (2012–2014)
- 64.4 – René Paredes (2011–2026)

Highest kickoff average, season (Minimum 40 attempts)

- 73.0 – Boris Bede (2018)
- 71.2 – Boris Bede (2023)
- 70.6 – Boris Bede (2016)
- 69.5 – Boris Bede (2019)
- 69.2 – Boris Bede (2024)

== Punting ==
Most punting yards, career

- 134,301 – Bob Cameron
- 133,826 – Lui Passaglia
- 92,281 – Hank Ilesic
- 89,093 – Paul Osbaldiston
- 87,629 – Terry Baker

Most punting yards, one season

- 8,214 – Bob Cameron (1988)
- 8,004 – Hank Ilesic (1986)
- 7,425 – Bob Cameron (1989)
- 7,307 – Ken Clark (1986)
- 7,302 – Bernie Ruoff (1957)

Most punting yards, one game

- 814 – Martin Fabi (September 14, 1963)
- 785 – Cam Fraser (September 14, 1958)
- 781 – Cam Fraser (November 5, 1955)
- 744 – Noel Prefontaine (July 3, 2004)

Most punts, career

- 3142 – Lui Passaglia
- 3129 – Bob Cameron
- 2142 – Paul Osbaldiston
- 2062 – Hank Ilesic
- 2031 – Terry Baker
- 2031 – Paul McCallum

Most punts, one season

- 188 – Bob Cameron (1988)
- 175 – Bob Cameron (1989)
- 168 – Ken Clark (1987)
- 168 – Tom Dixon (1988)
- 165 – Hank Ilesic (1986)
- 165 – Bob Cameron (1987)
- 165 – Glenn Harper (1988)

Most punts, one game

- 18 – Martin Fabi (1963)
- 17 – Larry Isbell (1955)
- 17 – Cam Fraser (1955)
- 16 – Avatus Stone (1954)
- 16 – Avatus Stone (1954)
- 16 – Ronnie Quillian (1957)
- 16 – Roger Kettlewell (1969)
- 16 – Troy Westwood (2003)
- 16 – Noel Prefontaine (2003)

Highest punting average, career (minimum 500 attempts)

- 47.5 – Richie Leone
- 45.8 – Damon Duval
- 45.7 – Burke Dales
- 45.7 – Noel Prefontaine
- 45.6 – Ken Clark

Highest punting average, season (minimum 90 attempts)

- 54.0 – Jake Julien (2024)
- 50.6 – Jon Ryan (2005)
- 50.3 – John Haggerty (2024)
- 50.3 – John Haggerty (2025)
- 50.2 – Lui Passaglia (1983)

Highest punting average, one game (minimum four punts)

- 64.7 – Nick Setta (July 17, 2008)
- 64.6 – John Haggerty (July 2, 2026)
- 64.3 – Cody Grace (August 25, 2022)
- 63.5 – Paul Osbaldiston (July 5, 2002)
- 62.4 – Richie Leone (August 13, 2016)

Longest punt

- 108 yards – Zenon Andrusyshyn, (October 23, 1977 at Clarke Stadium)
- 108 yards – Christopher Milo, (October 29, 2011 at Mosaic Stadium)
- 102 yards – Dave Mann,(September 18, 1966 at Taylor Field)
- 101 yards – Dean Dorsey, (October 11, 1982 at Winnipeg Stadium)
- 101 yards – Ken Clark, (September 3, 1983 at Taylor Field)

== Field goals ==
Most field goals, career

- 875 – Lui Passaglia
- 722 – Paul McCallum
- 673 – Mark McLoughlin
- 669 – Paul Osbaldiston
- 656 – Rene Paredes

Most field goals, season

- 60 – Justin Medlock (2016)
- 59 – Dave Ridgway (1990)
- 58 – Lewis Ward (2024)
- 58 – José Carlos Maltos (2025)
- 57 – Carlos Huerta (1995)
- 57 – Lirim Hajrullahu (2025)

Most field goals, game

- 9 – Vincent Blanchard (2026)
- 8 – Dave Ridgway (1984)
- 8 – Dave Ridgway (1988)
- 8 – Mark McLoughlin (1996)
- 8 – Paul Osbaldiston (1996)
- 8 – Lirim Hajrullahu (2024)
- 8 – Sean Whyte (2026)

Most field goals 50+ yards, career

- 44 – Sergio Castillo
- 40 – Troy Westwood
- 37 – Dave Cutler
- 37 – Lirim Hajrullahu
- 36 – Rene Paredes
- 34 – Justin Medlock

Most field goals 50+ yards, season

- 12 – Lirim Hajrullahu (2025)
- 11 – Sergio Castillo (2024)
- 9 – Sergio Castillo (2026)
- 8 – J. T. Hay (1986)
- 8 – Carlos Huerta (1994)
- 8 – Lewis Ward (2023)

Most field goals 50+ yards, game

- 3 – Justin Medlock (August 14, 2009)
- 3 – Lirim Hajrullahu (September 26, 2025)
- 2 – Many (Most recently René Paredes on September 19, 2026)

Most field goals 60+ yards, season

- 2 – Sergio Castillo (2024)
- 1 – Paul McCallum (2001)
- 1 – Dave Ridgway (1987)
- 1 – Sergio Castillo (2025)
- 1 – Rene Paredes (2026)

Highest field goal accuracy, career (minimum 100 attempts)

- 90.19% – José Maltos Díaz
- 89.02% – Sean Whyte
- 88.11% – Marc Liegghio
- 87.58% – Rene Paredes
- 86.67% – Vincent Blanchard
- 86.47% – Justin Medlock
- 86.36% – Lewis Ward
- 85.68% – Lirim Hajrullahu
- 84.74% – Sergio Castillo
- 84.17% – Tyler Crapigna

Highest field goal accuracy, season (minimum 30 attempts)

- 98.07% (51/52) – Lewis Ward (2018)
- 95.12% (39/41) – Sean Whyte (2025)
- 94.87% (37/39) – Boris Bede (2023)
- 94.74% (54/57) – Rene Paredes (2013)
- 94.34% (50/53) – Paul McCallum (2011)
- 94.34% (50/53) – Sean Whyte (2023)
- 94.34% (50/53) – Sean Whyte (2024)
- 93.75% (45/48) – Sean Whyte (2016)
- 93.22% (55/59) – Vincent Blanchard (2026)
- 93.18% (41/44) – Rene Paredes (2024)

Longest field goal

- 63 yards – Paul McCallum, (October 27, 2001 at Taylor Field)
- 63 yards – Sergio Castillo, (August 9, 2025 at McMahon Stadium)
- 62 yards – René Paredes, (September 19, 2026 at McMahon Stadium)
- 60 yards – Dave Ridgway, (September 6, 1987 at Taylor Field)
- 60 yards – Sergio Castillo, (June 29, 2024 at McMahon Stadium)
- 60 yards – Sergio Castillo, (August 1, 2024 at Princess Auto Stadium)
- 59 yards – Dave Cutler, (October 28, 1970 at Taylor Field)
- 59 yards – Paul Watson, (July 12, 1981 at Taylor Field)
- 59 yards – Brett Lauther, (August 16, 2025 at Mosaic Stadium)
- 58 yards – nine players (Most recently José Maltos on July 25, 2025 at McMahon Stadium)

Consecutive field goals

- 69 – Lewis Ward (2018–19)
- 47 – Sean Whyte (2023–24)
- 39 – Rene Paredes (2012–13)
- 33 – Marc Liegghio (2024–25)
- 32 – Sean Whyte (2024–25)
- 32 – Rene Paredes (2016)
- 30 – Paul McCallum (2011)
- 30 – Rene Paredes (2021–22)
- 28 – Dave Ridgway (1993)
- 28 – Christopher Milo (2013)
- 28 – Justin Medlock (2016–17)

== Punt returns ==
Most punt returns, career

- 1003 – Henry Williams
- 659 – Paul Bennett
- 610 – Michael Clemons
- 516 – Marvin Coleman
- 469 – Jason Armstead

Most punt returns, one season

- 123 – Jim Silye (1970)
- 118 – Anthony Hunter (1989)
- 112 – Rudy Linterman (1968)
- 111 – Darnell Clash (1985)
- 111 – Michael Clemons (1997)

Most punt returns, one game

- 14 – Rudy Linterman (1968)
- 14 – Will Lewis (1987)

Most punt return yards, career

- 11,257 – Henry Williams
- 6,358 – Paul Bennett
- 6,025 – Michael Clemons
- 5,211 – Marvin Coleman
- 4,746 – Stefan Logan

Most punt return yards, one season

- 1,440 – Henry Williams (1991)
- 1,236 – Rudy Linterman (1995)
- 1,216 – Javon Leake (2023)
- 1,200 – Roy Finch (2017)
- 1,181 – Anthony Hunter (1989)

Most punt return yards, one game

- 232 – Henry Williams (1991)
- 224 – Keith Stokes (2002)
- 222 – Janarion Grant (2019)
- 221 – Henry Williams (1987)

Longest punt return

- 113 – Sam Rogers (1995)
- 109 – Herb Johnson (1953)
- 109 – Parnell Moore (1988)
- 109 – Bashir Levingston (2005)

== Kick returns ==
Most kickoff returns, career

- 335 – Henry Williams
- 309 – Chris Rainey
- 303 – Stefan Logan
- 300 – Michael Clemons
- 292 – Jason Armstead

Most kickoff returns, one season

- 76 – Stefan Logan (2017)
- 75 – Kalil Pimpleton (2026)
- 74 – Ian Smart (2008)
- 72 – Chris Rainey (2017)
- 71 – Chad Owens (2012)

Most kickoff returns, one game

- 9 – Anthony Cherry (1989)
- 9 – Lee Hull (1990)
- 9 – Lorenzo Graham (1990)
- 9 – Freeman Baysinger (1994)
- 9 – Albert Johnson III (2000)
- 9 – Ian Smart (2008)
- 9 – Ian Smart (2009)
- 9 – Jovon Johnson (2009)
- 9 – Larry Taylor (2009)
- 9 – Brandon West (2011)

Most kickoff return yards, career

- 7,354 – Henry Williams
- 7,185 – Chris Rainey
- 6,683 – Stefan Logan
- 6,478 – Tristan Jackson
- 6,349 – Michael Clemons

Most kickoff return yards, one season

- 1,834 – Kalil Pimpleton (2026)
- 1,805 – Ian Smart (2008)
- 1,750 – Chad Owens (2011)
- 1,695 – Eric Blount (1998)
- 1,671 – Chris Rainey (2017)

Most kickoff return yards, one game

- 257 – Anthony Cherry (1989)
- 245 – Chad Owens (2011)
- 243 – Kalil Pimpleton (2026)
- 239 – Joe Hollimon (1976)
- 231 – Brandon West (2011)

Longest kickoff return

- 120 – Mack Herron (1972)
- 118 – Larry Highbaugh (1976)
- 115 – Bobby Thompson (1971)
- 113 – Sammy Greene (1983)
- 112 – Dave West (1952)
- 110 – Ryan Christian (2010)

== Missed field goal returns ==
Most missed field goal returns, career

- 59 – Henry Williams
- 35 – Keith Stokes
- 32 – Michael Clemons
- 32 – Winston October

Most missed field goal returns, season

- 11 – Joe Fuller (1987)
- 11 – Rashid Gayle (1999)

Most missed field goal return yards, career

- 1,646 – Henry Williams
- 1,330 – Keith Stokes
- 1,152 – Winston October
- 1,031 – Larry Taylor

Most missed field goal return yards, season

- 506 – Keith Stokes (2003)
- 425 – Chad Owens (2010)
- 408 – Tyreik McAllister (2023)
- 391 – Trey Vaval (2025)
- 384 – Marcus Thigpen (2010)

Most missed field goal return yards, game

- 199 – Trey Vaval at Ottawa Redblacks, September 20, 2025
- 189 – Tristan Jackson versus BC Lions, July 14, 2012
- 176 – Keith Stokes at Hamilton Tiger-Cats, August 16, 2003
- 174 – James Letcher Jr. at Saskatchewan Roughriders, August 16, 2024
- 171 – Tyreik McAllister at Montreal Alouettes, October 28, 2023

Longest missed field goal return

- 131 – Boyd Carter/Dave Mann versus Montreal Alouettes, August 22, 1958 (Carter for 15 yards, then lateral to Mann for 116 yards and TD)
- 130 – Ken Hinton versus Edmonton Eskimos, September 24, 1977
- 129 – Bashir Levingston versus BC Lions, June 28, 2007
- 129 – Dominique Dorsey at BC Lions, August 2, 2007
- 129 – Tristan Jackson versus BC Lions, July 14, 2012
- 129 – Trent Guy versus Toronto Argonauts, September 23, 2012
- 129 – Trey Vaval versus Toronto Argonauts, July 10, 2026

== See also ==
- List of Canadian Football League annual passing leaders
- List of Canadian Football League annual receiving leaders
- List of Canadian Football League annual rushing leaders
- List of Canadian Football League players with 1,000 rushing yards in a season
