= David West =

David West may refer to:

== Sports ==
- David Belford West (1896–1973), American football player
- David West (baseball) (1964–2022), American baseball player
- David West (basketball) (born 1980), American former basketball player
- Dave West (Canadian football) (1928–2005), Canadian football player
- David West (footballer) (born 1964), English former professional footballer
- David West (soccer) (born 1967), American soccer player

== Others ==
- Dave West (entrepreneur) (1944–2014), British entrepreneur and libertarian
- David West (artist) (1868–1936), Scottish watercolourist
- David West (Canadian politician), Mayor of Richmond Hill
- David Paul West, British theatre and film actor
- Supa Dave West, American hip-hip producer, see "Baby Phat"
- David Sherman West (1885–1973), American politician from the state of Iowa
- David West (classical scholar) (1926–2013), British classical scholar, translator of Lucretius, Horace and Virgil
