= Trey Vaval =

American football player (born 2000)

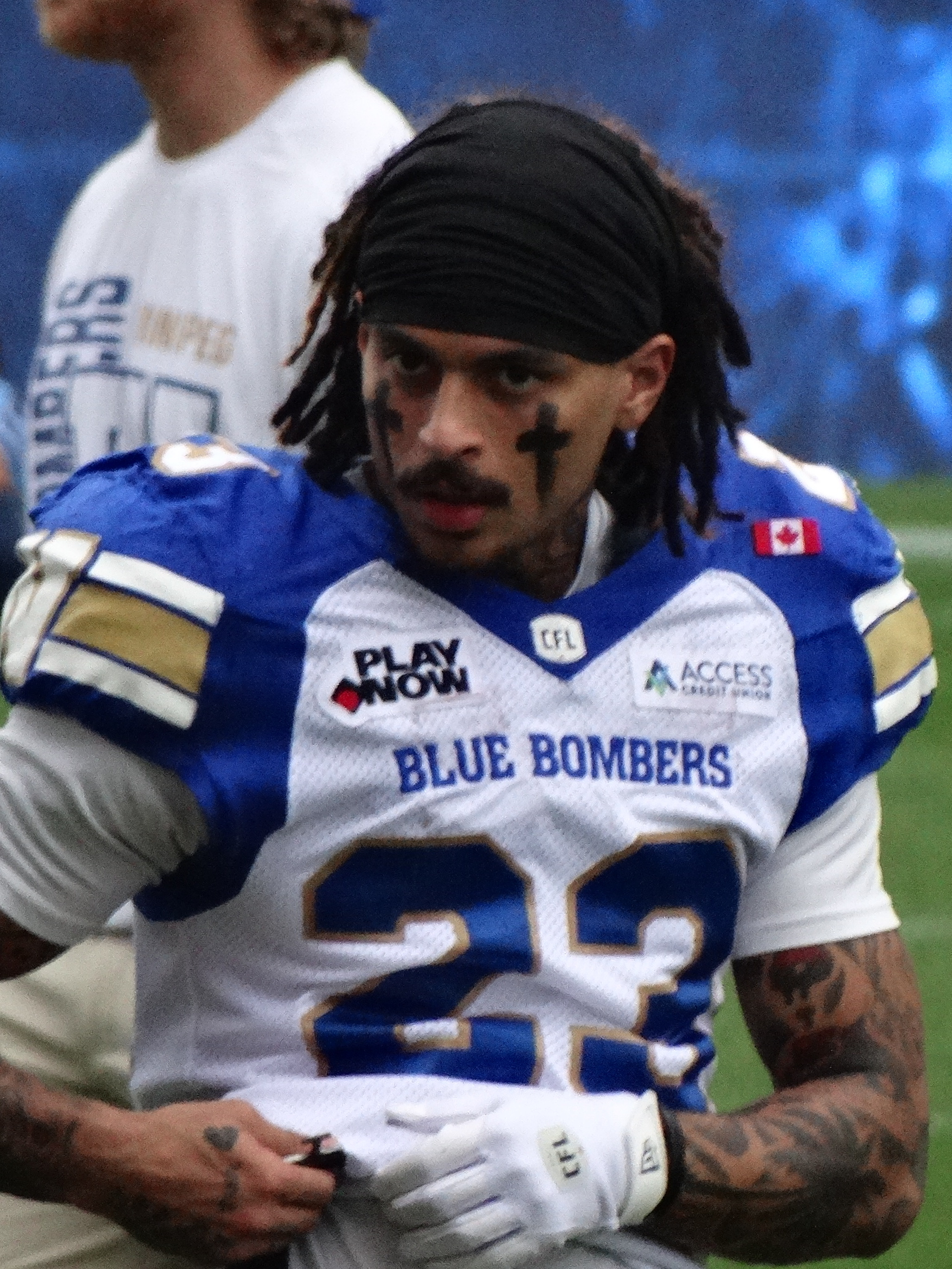
- Vaval with the Winnipeg Blue Bombers in 2025

No. 23 – Winnipeg Blue Bombers
- Positions: Defensive back, return specialist
- Roster status: Active
- CFL status: American

Personal information
- Born: August 25, 2000 (age 26); Blue Springs, Missouri, U.S.
- Listed height: 5 ft 11 in (1.80 m)
- Listed weight: 170 lb (77 kg)

Career information
- High school: Blue Springs South
- College: Missouri Western (2019–2020); Minnesota State (2021–2023)
- NFL draft: 2024: undrafted

Career history
- Atlanta Falcons (2024)*; Winnipeg Blue Bombers (2025–present)
- * Offseason or practice squad member only

Awards and highlights
- John Agro Special Teams Award (2025, 2026); CFL Most Outstanding Rookie (2025); Jackie Parker Trophy (2025); 2x CFL All-Star (2025); 2x CFL West All-Star (2025, 2026); Second-team D-II All-American (2019); 2× First-team All-NSIC (2022, 2023); First-team All-MIAA (2019); Second-team All-NSIC (2022)

Career CFL statistics as of 2026
- Tackles: 49
- Interceptions: 1
- Kickoff return yards: 2,464
- Punt return yards: 2,023
- Return touchdowns: 6
- Stats at CFL.ca

Trey Vaval (born August 25, 2000) is an American professional football defensive back and return specialist for the Winnipeg Blue Bombers of the Canadian Football League (CFL). He played college football for the Missouri Western Griffons and Minnesota State Mavericks. Vaval also had a stint with the Atlanta Falcons of the National Football League (NFL).

== College career ==
Vaval played college football at Missouri Western from 2019 to 2020 and Minnesota State from 2021 to 2023. He played in 22 games at Missouri Western logging 1,326 kick return yards, two kickoff return touchdowns, 582 punt return yards, 45 tackles and one interception. He earned All-MIAA and an AFCA All-American honors as a returner in his freshman year.

At Minnesota State, he played in 25 games recording 617 kick return yards one kickoff return touchdown, 704 punt return yards, one punt return touchdown. On defense he had 69 tackles, one sack, two interceptions, 14 pass breakups and 5 blocked kicks. In 2022, he was named to All-NSIC first-team as a kick returner and second-team as a defensive back. In 2023, he was named to first-team honors as both a kick returner and defender.

== Professional career ==
Pre-draft measurables
Height	Weight	Arm length	Hand span	Wingspan	40-yard dash	10-yard split	20-yard split	20-yard shuttle	Three-cone drill	Vertical jump	Broad jump	Bench press
5 ft 10 3/4 in (1.80 m)	173 lb (78 kg)	29 3/8 in (0.75 m)	8 1/8 in (0.21 m)	5 ft 10 5/8 in (1.79 m)	4.50 s	1.68 s	2.60 s	4.25 s	6.90 s	37.0 in (0.94 m)	10 ft 8 in (3.25 m)	8 reps
All values from Pro Day

=== Atlanta Falcons ===
After not being selected in the 2024 NFL draft, Vaval signed with the Atlanta Falcons as an undrafted free agent. He was released on August 25.

=== Winnipeg Blue Bombers ===
Vaval was signed by the Winnipeg Blue Bombers on February 4, 2025. He made his CFL debut against the BC Lions on June 13, 2025, where he returned seven punts for 85 yards, two kickoffs for 61 yards and a fumble recovery. On August 1, 2025, in a game against the Toronto Argonauts, Vaval became the first player in Blue Bombers franchise history to return a punt and kickoff for a touchdown in the same game. On September 20, 2025, against the Ottawa Redblacks, he returned a missed field goal 128 yards for a touchdown, which tied for the seventh-longest in CFL history. In the same game, he returned another missed field goal 71 yards and set the CFL record for most missed field goal return yards in a single game.
