= Boris Bede =

French gridiron football player (born 1989)

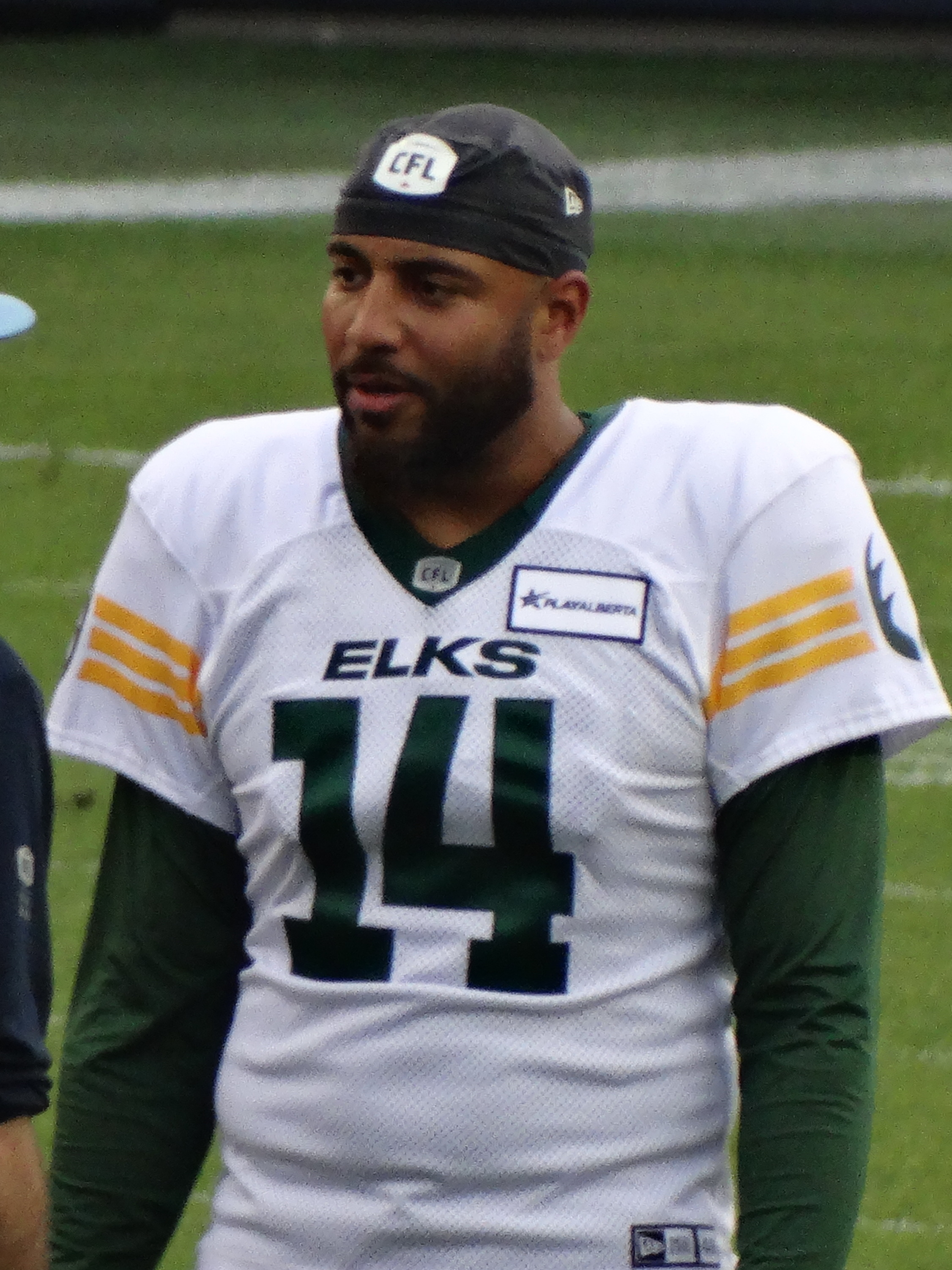
- Bede with the Edmonton Elks in 2024

Profile
- Positions: Placekicker, Punter

Personal information
- Born: November 20, 1989 (age 36); Toulon, France
- Listed height: 6 ft 4 in (1.93 m)
- Listed weight: 225 lb (102 kg)

Career information
- High school: Framingham (Framingham, Massachusetts)
- College: Tiffin
- University: Laval

Career history
- 2015–2019: Montreal Alouettes
- 2020–2023: Toronto Argonauts
- 2024: Edmonton Elks

Awards and highlights
- Grey Cup champion (2022); 3× CFL East All-Star (2015, 2021, 2023); CFL records: Highest kickoff average, career (69.4 yards); Highest kickoff average, season (73.0 yards); Longest kickoff (100 yards)

Career CFL statistics
- Games played: 144
- Field goals made: 274
- Field goals attempted: 330
- Field goal %: 83.03
- Points scored: 1,090
- Longest field goal: 56
- Stats at CFL.ca

Boris Bede (born November 20, 1989) is a French-Canadian professional football placekicker and punter. He most recently played for the Edmonton Elks of the Canadian Football League (CFL). He first enrolled at Tiffin University before transferring to Université Laval. Bede has been nicknamed "Boom Boom" for his strong leg on kickoffs and punts.

== Early life ==
Bede was born in Toulon, France and grew up playing soccer. He arrived in the United States in 2005 and played American football at Framingham High School in Framingham, Massachusetts. He also participated in soccer and track and field at Framingham.

== College career ==
Bede played American football for the Tiffin Dragons of Tiffin University from 2008 to 2010, earning Honorable Mention All-GLIAC honors in 2009.

In the summer of 2011, Bede was on the verge of playing soccer for the Sherbrooke Vert et Or of the Université de Sherbrooke before deciding to play Canadian football at Université Laval. He played for the Laval Rouge et Or from 2011 to 2014. He made 63 of his 78 field goal attempts, including a career-long 44-yarder in 2013, during his college career. Bede also accumulated 39.4 yards per punt on 292 punts. He was named to the RSEQ All-Star team in 2012, 2013 and 2014. He was also named the Quebec Conference's special teams player of the year in 2014. Bede helped the Rouge et Or win the 48th Vanier Cup in 2012 and the 49th Vanier Cup in 2013 after the Rouge et Or lost the 47th Vanier Cup in 2011.

== Professional career ==
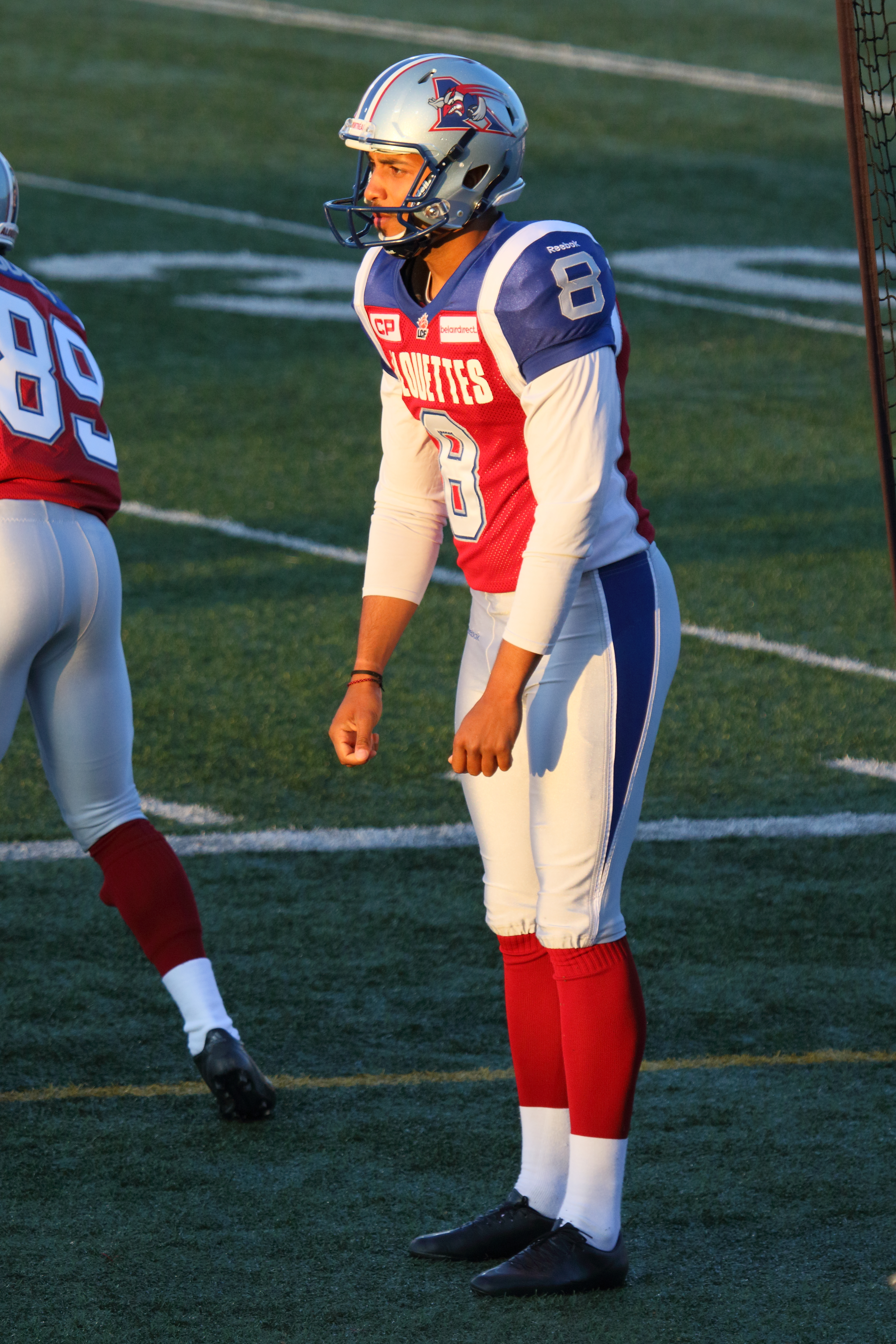
Bede with the Montreal Alouettes in 2015

=== Montreal Alouettes ===
Bede signed with the Montreal Alouettes of the CFL on February 19, 2015. He attempted and later made the first 32-yard extra point in the league's history on June 25, 2015. Bede had a very successful first season in the CFL, converting 36 out of 40 field goal attempts (90% success rate, second highest in the league); he did however miss on 6 of 31, extra-point converts. For his efforts, he was named a CFL East All-Star in his rookie season. Bede struggled mightily at the start of the 2016 season and was effectively benched by the Alouettes' seventh game of the season, having made only 7 out of 16 field goal attempts, before returning as the starting kicker by the Alouettes' 15th game of the season. After re-gaining his position, he was the Alouettes' kicker and punter through the 2019 CFL season, where he played in 80 regular season games connecting on 141 field goals out of 171 attempts for a success rate of 82.5%. He had punted 510 times for an average of 44.2 yards.

=== Toronto Argonauts ===
On February 13, 2020, Bede was traded to the Toronto Argonauts for fellow kicker Tyler Crapigna. He did not play in 2020 due to the cancellation of the 2020 CFL season, but he re-signed with the Argonauts on December 31, 2020. In 2021, he played in 13 of 14 regular season games where he connected on 28 of 33 field goal attempts and was successful on 100% of his convert attempts for the first time in his career. He was also the team's punter where he had 86 punts for a 44.2-yard average.

In 2022, Bede relinquished punting duties to John Haggerty, so he could focus on placekicking and kickoffs. However, he was successful on just 43 of 55 field goal attempts (78.2%). On July 4, 2022, he missed the game tying extra point attempt with only 25 seconds remaining in the fourth quarter, resulting in the Winnipeg Blue Bombers winning the contest. Bede set a career-high with a 56-yard field goal made and also set a CFL record for longest kickoff at 100 yards. He played in his first Grey Cup game that year, but struggled as he made three of six field goal attempts. However, he was successful on both convert attempts, including the game-winning conversion as the Argonauts defeated the Winnipeg Blue Bombers 24–23 in the 109th Grey Cup and Bede won his first championship.

In the 2023 season, Bede played in 17 regular season games where he connected on 37 of 39 field goal attempts, with the 94.87% success rate being the second-highest in league history, behind Lewis Ward's 98.07% in 2018. He also punted in the team's last nine regular season games, filling in for the injured John Haggerty, where he punted 48 times with a 46.8-yard average. At the end of the season, he was named a CFL East All-Star at placekicker. As a pending free agent, Bede was given an early release by the Argonauts on February 5, 2024, as the team signed Lirim Hajrullahu as his replacement on the same day.

=== Edmonton Elks ===
On February 6, 2024, it was announced that Bede had signed a two-year contract with the Edmonton Elks. In a game against the Ottawa Redblacks on July 14, 2024, with the score tied, Bede had an illegal kickoff out of bounds penalty with eight seconds to play, which led to a quick pass and walk off field goal win for the Redblacks. Overall, he had a disappointing season as he was benched on two different occasions, playing in 16 regular season games and connecting on 25 of 32 field goals while ranking last in the league in field goal percentage (78.1%). With a roster bonus due on February 1, 2025, Bede was released on January 28, 2025.

== International career ==
Bede played for the France national American football team in the 2014 EFAF European Championship.

== Personal life ==
Bede's father, Alain Bédé, played for the Ivory Coast national football team. His brother Kévin Baillili played football, in French lower leagues for Evry FC, SC Toulon-Le Las, AS Poissy as well the second team of Paris Saint-Germain and more recently for Trois-Bassins FC of Réunion. In 2025, Bede became a Canadian citizen.
