= John Haggerty (Canadian football) =

Australian gridiron football player (born 1995)

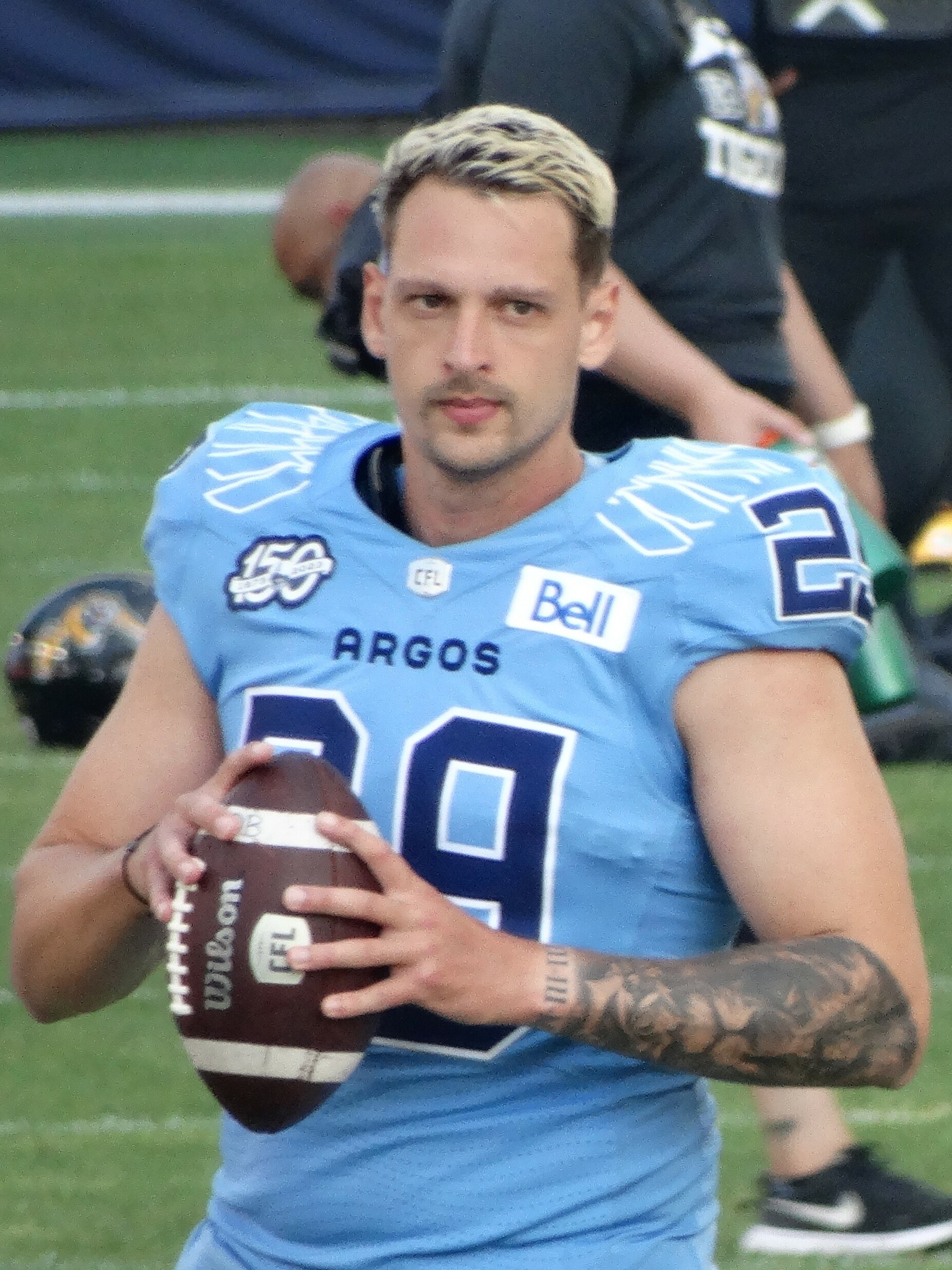
- Haggerty with the Toronto Argonauts in 2023

No. 29 – Toronto Argonauts
- Position: Punter
- Roster status: Practice roster
- CFL status: Global

Personal information
- Born: 6 February 1995 (age 31); Sydney, New South Wales, Australia
- Listed height: 6 ft 5 in (1.96 m)
- Listed weight: 225 lb (102 kg)

Career information
- College: Western Kentucky
- CFL draft: 2022G: 1st round, 4th overall pick

Career history
- Toronto Argonauts (2022–present)

Awards and highlights
- 2× Grey Cup champion (2022, 2024); 2× CFL East All-Star (2022, 2024)
- Stats at CFL.ca

John Haggerty III (born 6 February 1995) is an Australian professional gridiron football punter for the Toronto Argonauts of the Canadian Football League (CFL). He is a two-time Grey Cup champion after winning with the Argonauts in 2022 and 2024.

== Early life ==
Haggerty grew up in Sydney, Australia, where he played rugby, Australian rules football, and soccer. His biggest inspiration in sports was Kobe Bryant and he played football with Michael Dickson.

== College career ==
After attending Prokick Australia, a program designed to train Australian athletes in gridiron football, Haggerty was recruited to the Western Kentucky Hilltoppers program where he played college football from 2019 to 2021. He set single-season program records for punting average in each of his three years, with 45.7 yards in 2020, 45.9 yards in 2019, and 48.7 yards in 2021.

== Professional career ==
Pre-draft measurables
Height	Weight	Arm length	Hand span	Wingspan
6 ft 4 1/2 in (1.94 m)	220 lb (100 kg)	32 1/2 in (0.83 m)	8 5/8 in (0.22 m)	6 ft 3 3/8 in (1.91 m)
All values from Pro Day

Haggerty was drafted in the first round, fourth overall by the Toronto Argonauts in the 2022 CFL global draft and signed with the team on 10 May 2022. Following 2022 training camp, he was named the team's punter, allowing Boris Bede to focus on placekicking. He played in his first career professional game on 16 June 2022, against the Montreal Alouettes, where he had four punts for a 51.2-yard average and scored two singles in the one-point victory. Haggerty played in 17 regular season games where he had 107 punts for a 48.2-yard average, 36.9 yards net, and five singles. He was named a CFL East All-Star at the end of the regular season. He also played in his first Grey Cup game where he had six punts for a 49.2-yard average as the Argonauts defeated the Winnipeg Blue Bombers 24–23 in the 109th Grey Cup and Haggerty won his first championship.

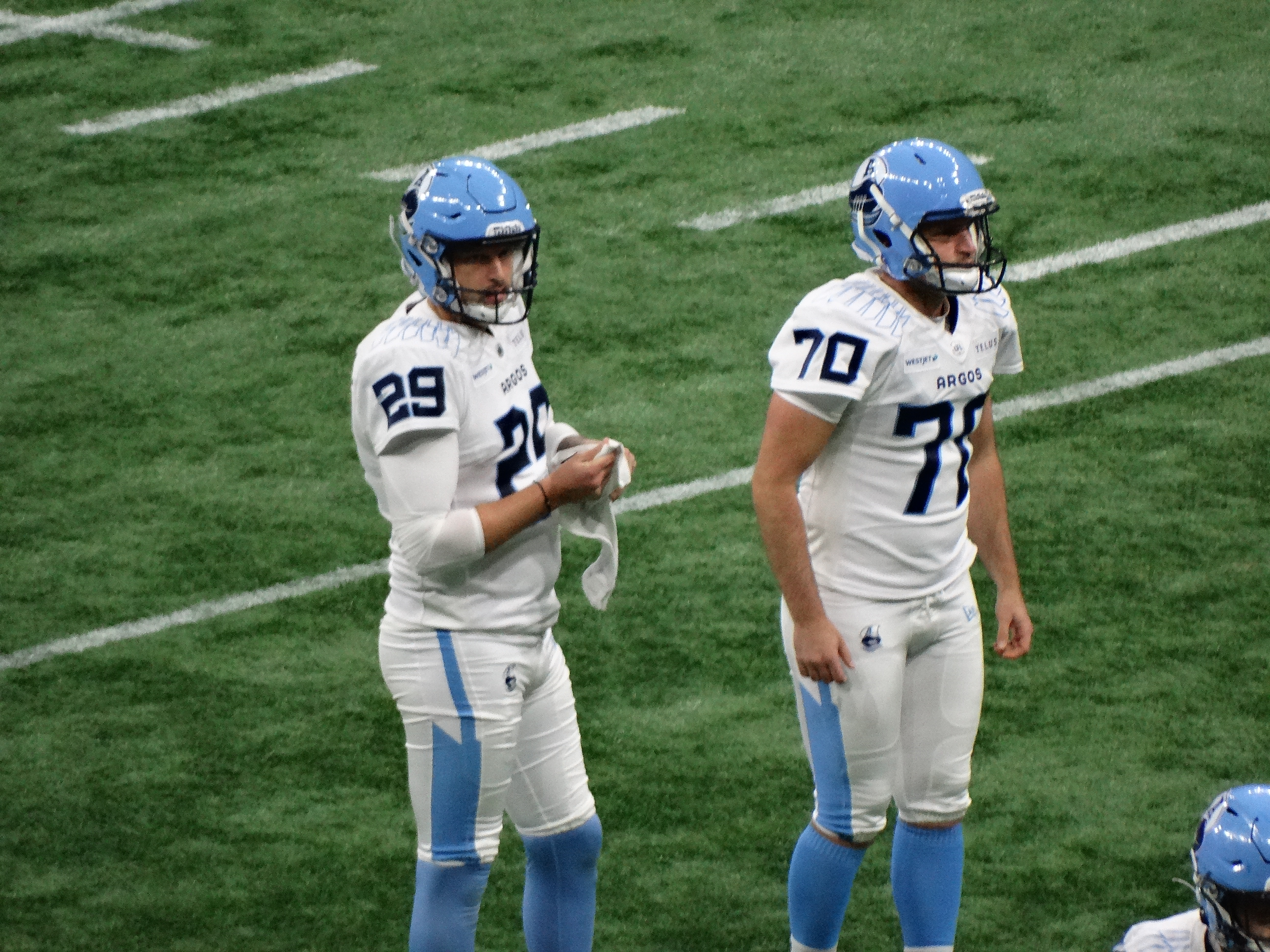
Haggerty (left) in the 111th Grey Cup with the Argonauts in 2024

In 2023, Haggerty played in 12 games while sitting out six due to injury. He led the league in punting average with 48.0 yards per punt and had three singles. He also played in the team's East Final loss to the Montreal Alouettes.

In the 2024 season, Haggerty played in all 18 regular season games and had 88 punts for a 50.3-yard average which ranked as the third-highest single season punting average of all-time. However, it was the second-highest average in that season as Jake Julien set the all-time record that year. Nonetheless, Haggerty was named to the East Division All-CFL team for the second time in his career. He also played in all three post-season games, including the 111th Grey Cup where he had five punts for a 54.8-yard average and one single in the Argonauts' 41–24 victory over the Winnipeg Blue Bombers. He became a free agent upon the expiry of his contract on 11 February 2025. However, he eventually re-signed with the Argonauts on 4 April 2025.

== Personal life ==
Haggerty and his wife, Spenser, have one son, Lincoln John Haggerty, who was born in July 2021.
