= Sergio Castillo =

American gridiron football player (born 1990)

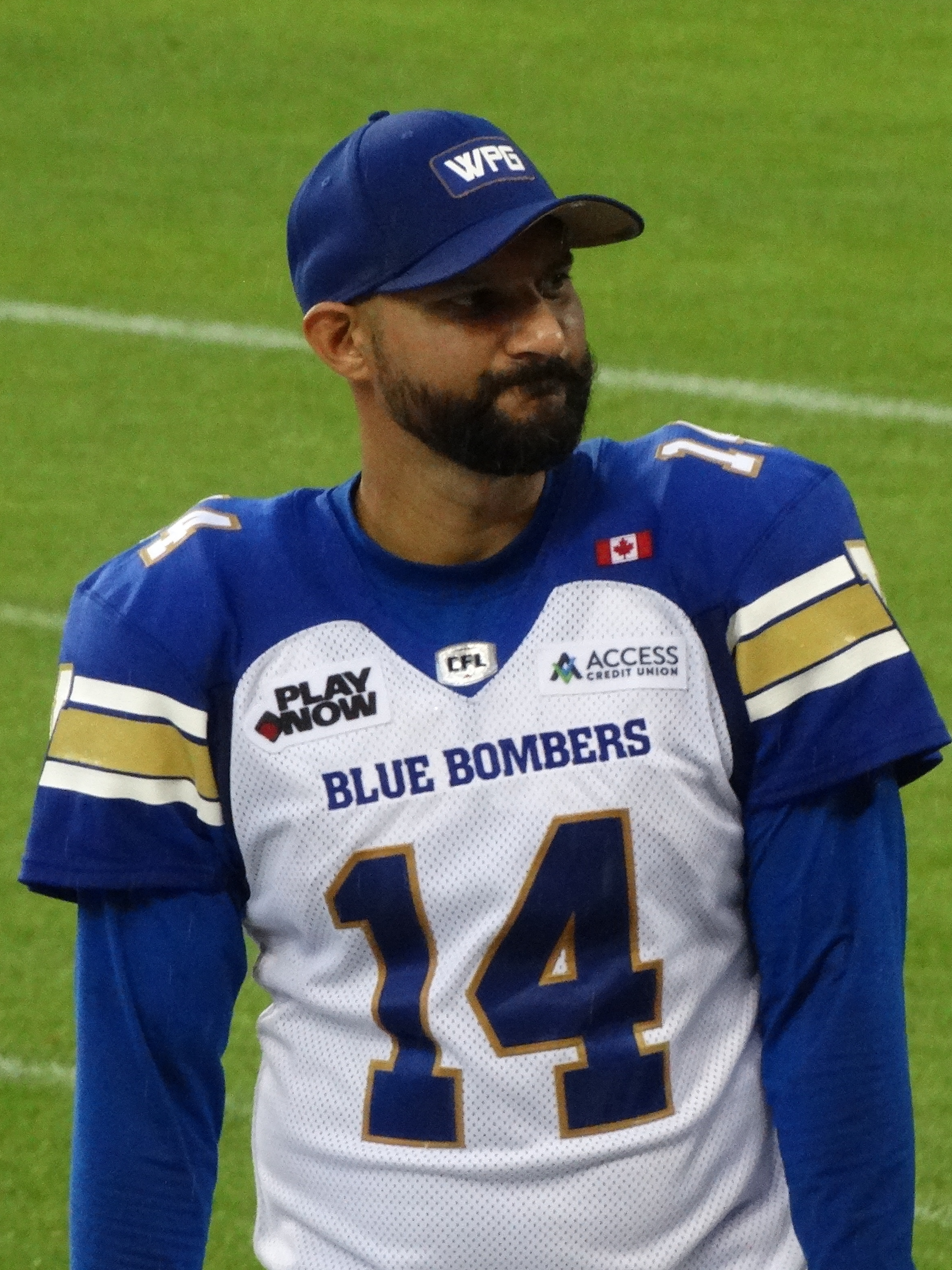
- Castillo with the Winnipeg Blue Bombers in 2025

No. 14 – Winnipeg Blue Bombers
- Position: Kicker
- Roster status: Active
- CFL status: American

Personal information
- Born: November 1, 1990 (age 36); La Joya, Texas, U.S.
- Listed height: 5 ft 9 in (1.75 m)
- Listed weight: 202 lb (92 kg)

Career information
- High school: La Joya
- College: West Texas A&M
- NFL draft: 2014: undrafted

Career history
- Atlanta Falcons (2014)*; Winnipeg Blue Bombers (2015–2016); Ottawa Redblacks (2016); Hamilton Tiger-Cats (2017); Ottawa Redblacks (2018)*; San Antonio Commanders (2019)*; BC Lions (2019); Houston Roughnecks (2020); BC Lions (2020); New York Jets (2020); Winnipeg Blue Bombers (2021); Edmonton Elks (2022); Winnipeg Blue Bombers (2023–present)
- * Offseason or practice squad member only

Awards and highlights
- Grey Cup champion (2021); CFL All-Star (2019); CFL West All-Star (2019); Dave Dryburgh Memorial Trophy (2023, 2025); Fred Mitchell Award (2013); CFL records: Longest field goal made: 63 yards; Longest kickoff: 100 yards; Most 60-yard field goals, career: 3; Most 60-yard field goals, season: 2 (2024); Most 50-yard field goals, season: 11 (2024)

Career NFL statistics
- Games played: 7
- Field goals: 8
- Field goal attempts: 13
- Field goal %: 61.5
- Longest: 55
- Stats at Pro Football Reference

Career CFL statistics as of 2026
- Games played: 132
- Field goals: 322
- Field goal attempts: 380
- Field goal %: 84.7
- Longest: 63
- Stats at CFL.ca

Sergio Castillo (born November 1, 1990) is an American professional football placekicker and punter for the Winnipeg Blue Bombers of the Canadian Football League (CFL). He played college football at West Texas A&M. He holds several CFL records, including longest field goal made (63 yards), most 60-yard field goals in a season (2), and most 50-yard field goals in a season (11).

== Professional career ==
=== Atlanta Falcons ===
Castillo was undrafted in the 2014 NFL draft and signed as a free agent placekicker with the Atlanta Falcons of the National Football League on June 12, 2014. He played in the team's first preseason game, being successful on both of his field goal attempts and averaging 66.0 yards on two kickoffs. Unable to unseat the incumbent, Matt Bryant, Castillo was released shortly after that game on August 9, 2014.

=== Winnipeg Blue Bombers (first stint) ===
On August 28, 2015, Castillo signed with the Winnipeg Blue Bombers to a practice roster agreement. After the incumbent Winnipeg kicker, Lirim Hajrullahu, missed four of five field goal attempts in a week 15 game against the Edmonton Eskimos, Castillo replaced him and made his professional regular season debut on October 10, 2015, against the BC Lions. He was a perfect 5-for-5 in field goal attempts in his debut and remained the team's placekicker for the last four games of the season, finishing with 10 field goals from 13 attempts.

In the following off-season, the Blue Bombers moved on from Hajrullahu and signed Justin Medlock to compete with Castillo. As the most accurate placekicker in CFL history, Medlock won the starting job and Castillo began the season on the injured list. He did not play in a regular season game in 2016 and was eventually released on September 2, 2016.

=== Ottawa Redblacks (first stint) ===
On September 11, 2016, Castillo signed with the Ottawa Redblacks and replaced the injured Zackary Medeiros at punter. Castillo punted in two games, recording 13 punts for a 45.2-yard average, but was released on September 26, 2016.

=== Hamilton Tiger-Cats ===
On May 28, 2017, Castillo signed with the Hamilton Tiger-Cats to compete for the kicker position vacated by Brett Maher. He won all three kicking duties following training camp and had a career year with the Tiger-Cats. He made 29 of 34 field goals, 20 of 21 converts, and had 93 punts for a 45.1-yard average in 14 games. However, on October 6, 2017, Castillo suffered a season-ending ACL injury while attempting to make a tackle after his missed field goal attempt. He was released in the following off-season on February 24, 2018.

=== Ottawa Redblacks (second stint) ===
Castillo signed again with the Redblacks on April 9, 2018, to try out for a vacant kicker position, soon after his recovery from his ACL injury, but was unable to secure a position with the team. He remained unsigned for the 2018 CFL season and did not play that year.

=== San Antonio Commanders ===
Castillo was one of the first players to sign with the San Antonio Commanders of the upstart Alliance of American Football when his signing was announced on August 6, 2018. He did not play in the Spring-based league as he was released on January 19, 2019.

=== BC Lions (first stint) ===
On May 26, 2019, Castillo signed with the BC Lions and began the season with all three kicking duties. He started the season making all ten of his field goal attempts before missing a potential game-winning 42-yard field goal try in the July 6, 2019, game against the Toronto Argonauts. However, because the kick had enough distance, the returner, Chris Rainey, stepped out of bounds at the end line and Castillo had the first game-winning last-play rouge since October 14, 2002. He finished the season connecting on 41 field goals out of 45 attempts for a league-leading 91.1% success rate and was named a CFL All-Star.

=== Houston Roughnecks ===
On November 22, 2019, Castillo was drafted by the Houston Roughnecks in the 2020 XFL Supplemental Draft. He played in five games and was successful on five field goals. He had his contract terminated when the league suspended operations on April 10, 2020.

=== BC Lions (second stint) ===
On April 20, 2020, Castillo signed a two-year contract to re-join the Lions. After the CFL canceled the 2020 season due to the COVID-19 pandemic, Castillo chose to opt-out of his contract with the Lions on August 28, 2020.

=== New York Jets ===
On October 14, 2020, Castillo was signed to the New York Jets practice squad. He was elevated to the active roster on October 24 for the team's Week 7 game against the Buffalo Bills with Sam Ficken out with a groin injury. He converted a field goal attempt and an extra point in the game, and reverted to the practice squad the next day. He was promoted to the active roster on October 31. On December 15, 2020, the Jets waived Castillo after missing three kicks in a blowout 40–3 loss to the Seattle Seahawks. On December 17, 2020, the Jets re-signed Castillo to their practice squad. His practice squad contract with the team expired after the season on January 11, 2021.

=== Winnipeg Blue Bombers (second stint) ===
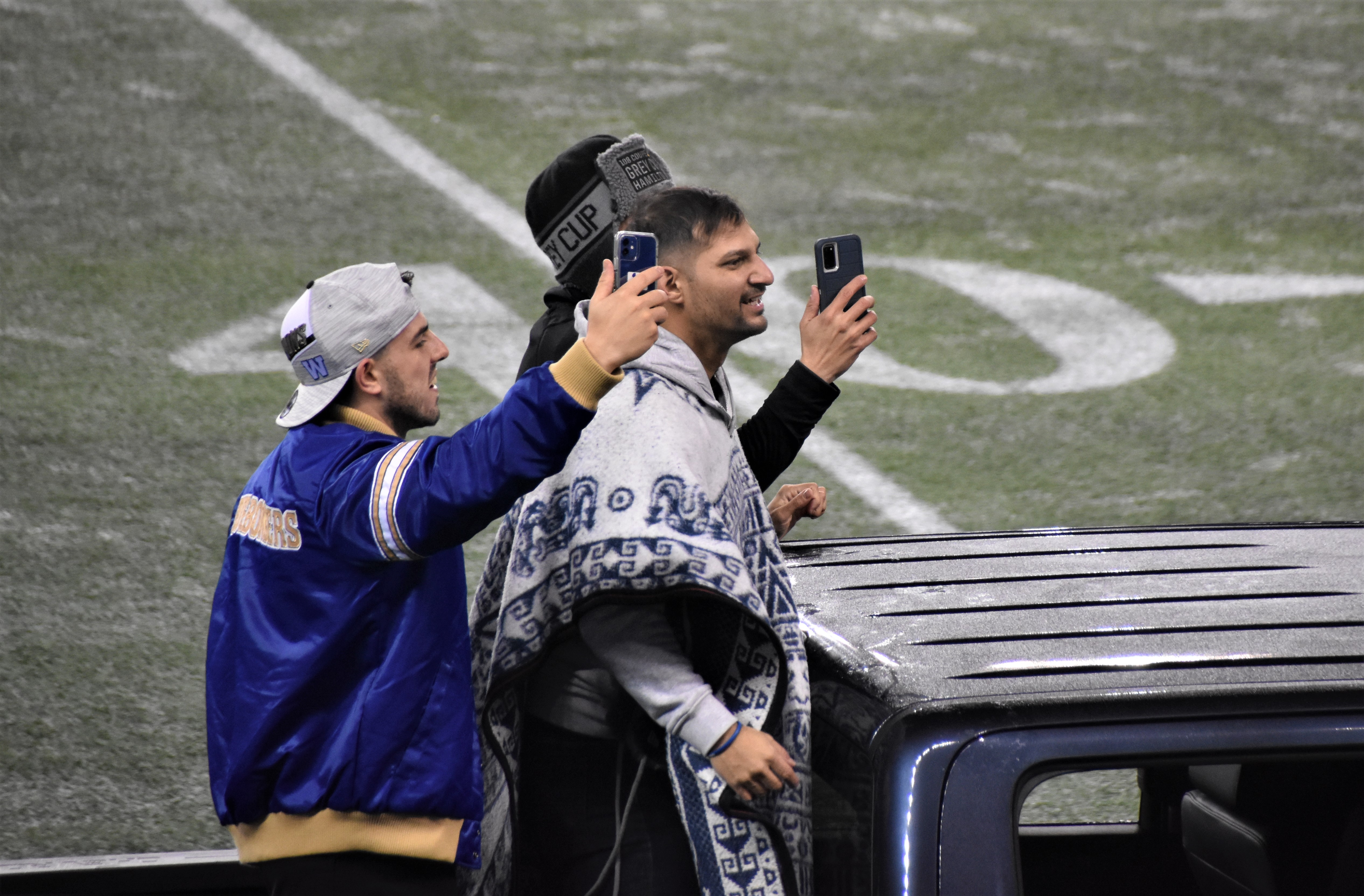
Castillo at Winnipeg's 2021 Grey Cup celebration at IG Field.

On October 19, 2021, the Blue Bombers acquired Castillo's playing rights via trade from the BC Lions, in exchange for a conditional 4th round pick in the 2022 CFL draft. He signed with the Blue Bombers on the same day. The Lions had maintained Castillo's rights after he opted out of his two-year contract on August 28, 2020, to pursue opportunities in the NFL. Once he joined the team he quickly became the team's placekicker for the team, going 7 of 9 during the rest of the regular season. Castillo's abilities were not required in the CFL West Division final taking place at home in stormy conditions as the bombers scored three touchdowns to get to the 108th Grey Cup. There Castillo played a starring role for the Bombers, he went 5 for 5 on field goals, converting one extra point and while kicking with the high winds in the fourth quarter scored two critical rouges as the Bombers would go on to win 33-25 in overtime. These were Castillo's first CFL playoff games and therefore his first Grey Cup championship.

=== Edmonton Elks ===
On March 14, 2022, Castillo signed with the Edmonton Elks to a two-year contract. He played in all 18 regular season games where he connected on 37 of 44 field goal attempts (84.1%) and 26 of 29 conversion attempts (89.7%). He was released shortly before 2023 training camp on May 4, 2023.

=== Winnipeg Blue Bombers (third stint) ===
Shortly after his release from Edmonton, Castillo signed again with the Winnipeg Blue Bombers on May 4, 2023. On August 9, 2025, against the hosts Calgary Stampeders, Castillo kicked a 63-yard field goal, tying a CFL record set by Paul McCallum in 2001, to put the Bombers up 26–25 with 1:01 remaining in the game. It was Castillo's third 60-yard field goal of his career, as he had previously made two kicks from exactly 60 yards in 2024, which is also a CFL record he holds. However, after his record-setting kick, following a Winnipeg one-point rouge on the ensuing kickoff, Calgary kicked a game-winning field goal as time expired to take the game from the Blue Bombers by a score of 28–27.
