= Alain Bédé =

Ivorian footballer

Personal information
- Full name: Alain "James" Bédé
- Date of birth: 20 August 1970 (age 56)
- Place of birth: Attécoubé, Ivory Coast
- Position: Defender

Youth career
- Stella Adjamé

Senior career*
Years	Team	Apps	(Gls)
1987–1990	SC Toulon		
1990–1993	ASEC Mimosas		

International career
1992	Ivory Coast		
- * Club domestic league appearances and goals

Alain "James" Bédé (born 20 August 1970) is an Ivorian former footballer who played as a defender.

== Career ==
Bédé played for Sporting Toulon during the 1987–88 season.

Bédé was a member of the Ivory Coast national team during the 1992 King Fahd Cup.

== Personal life ==
Bédé is the father of gridiron football player Boris Bede. Alain also runs his own football academy, James Bede Soccer Academy (JBSA), in Framingham, Massachusetts. JBSA was established in 1998 as Soccer Skill International before changing to its current name in 2002.
