= James Zachery =

American football player (1958–1994)

No. 55, 92
- Positions: Defensive tackle, defensive end

Personal information
- Born: August 27, 1958; Midland, Texas, U.S.
- Died: January 25, 1994 (aged 35); Midland, Texas, U.S.
- Listed height: 6 ft 2 in (1.88 m)
- Listed weight: 245 lb (111 kg)

Career information
- High school: Midland (Texas)
- College: Texas A&M (1976–1979)
- NFL draft: 1980: 11th round, 290: th overall pick

Career history
- New York Jets (1980)*; Montreal Alouettes (1980–1981); Montreal Concordes (1982–1984); Washington Redskins (1985)*; Edmonton Eskimos (1985–1987)
- * Offseason or practice squad member only

Awards and highlights
- Grey Cup champion (1987); CFL West All-Star (1986); CFL record: Most blocked kicks in a season: 5 (1986)

Career CFL statistics
- Quarterback sacks: 37
- Fumble recoveries: 5
- Interceptions: 4

James Ray Zachery (August 27, 1958 – January 25, 1994) was an American professional football defensive lineman who played eight seasons in the Canadian Football League (CFL) with the Montreal Alouettes, Montreal Concordes and Edmonton Eskimos. He was selected by the New York Jets in the eleventh round of the 1980 NFL draft. He played college football at Texas A&M University. Zachery was a member of the Eskimos team that won the 75th Grey Cup.

== Early life and college ==
James Ray Zachery was born on August 27, 1958, in Midland, Texas. He attended Midland High School in Midland.

Zachery was a member of the Texas A&M Aggies of Texas A&M University from 1976 to 1979 and was a three-year letterman from 1977 to 1979.

== Professional career ==
Zachery was selected by the New York Jets in the 11th round, with the 290th overall pick, of the 1980 NFL draft. He was released by the Jets on September 1, 1980.

He then played in 49 games for the Montreal Alouettes/Concordes of the Canadian Football League (CFL) from 1980 to 1984.

Zachery signed with the Washington Redskins of the NFL in 1985. He was released on August 20, 1985.

He played in 44 games for the Edmonton Eskimos of the CFL from 1985 to 1987. In 1986, he set a single-season CFL record with five blocked kicks and was also named a CFL West All-Star. The Eskimos won the 75th Grey Cup in 1987. Zachery recorded 37 sacks and seven blocked kicks during his CFL career.

== Death ==
Zachery died on January 25, 1994, after he was the victim of a gang attack. 17-year-old De-Vann Stewart was initially charged with Zachary's murder. Stewart was later sentenced to 20 years on a manslaughter conviction and a second defendant, Don Jackson, was convicted of aggravated assault and sentenced to 50 years in prison.

== See also ==
- List of Canadian Football League records (individual)
