= Stefan Logan =

American gridiron football player (born 1981)

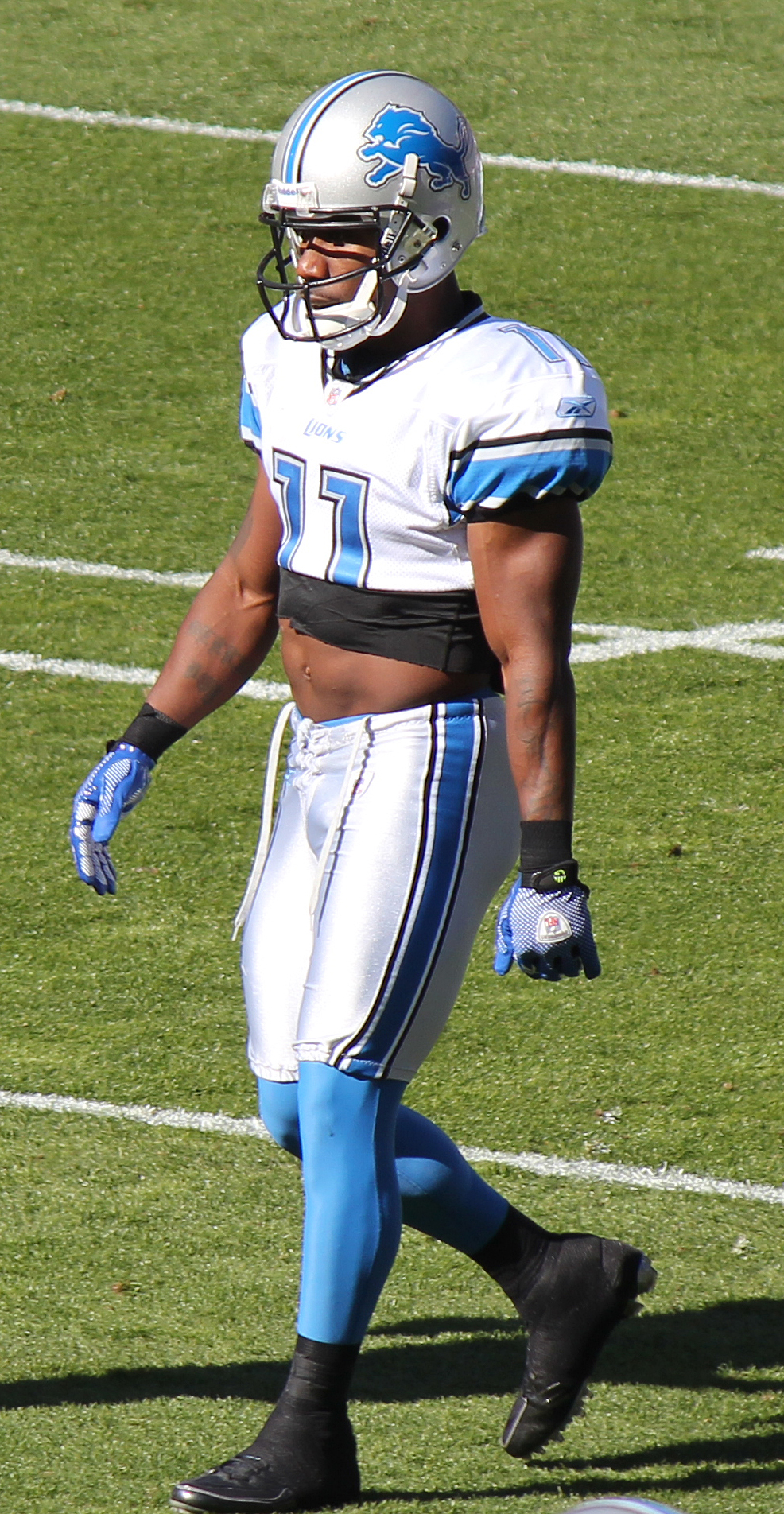
- Logan with the Detroit Lions in 2011

No. 11
- Position: Running back

Personal information
- Born: June 2, 1981 (age 45); Tampa, Florida, U.S.
- Listed height: 5 ft 7 in (1.70 m)
- Listed weight: 177 lb (80 kg)

Career information
- High school: Miami (FL) Jackson
- College: South Dakota
- NFL draft: 2007: undrafted

Career history
- Miami Dolphins (2007)*; BC Lions (2008); Pittsburgh Steelers (2009); Detroit Lions (2010–2012); BC Lions (2013–2014); Montreal Alouettes (2015–2019); Ottawa Redblacks (2019)
- * Offseason or practice squad member only

Career NFL statistics
- Rushing attempts: 27
- Rushing yards: 144
- Receptions: 8
- Receiving yards: 52
- Return yards: 5,586
- Total touchdowns: 1
- Stats at Pro Football Reference

Career CFL statistics
- Rushing attempts: 325
- Rushing yards: 2,007
- Receiving yards: 971
- Return yards: 11,970
- Total touchdowns: 11
- Stats at CFL.ca

Stefan Logan (born June 2, 1981) is an American former professional football player who was a running back and special teamer in the National Football League (NFL) and Canadian Football League (CFL). He was signed by the Miami Dolphins of the NFL as an undrafted free agent in 2007. He played college football at the University of South Dakota. Logan also played for the BC Lions, Montreal Alouettes, and Ottawa Redblacks in the CFL, and the Pittsburgh Steelers and Detroit Lions of the NFL.

== Early life ==
Logan attended Miami Jackson High School in Miami, Florida. He took a three-year break from football before enrolling at the University of South Dakota in Vermillion, SD.

Aside from football, Logan also ran track in college, where he set a conference record of 6.75 seconds in the 60 meters. Logan also ran the 100 meters, recording a personal best of 10.78 seconds.

Personal bests

Event	Time (seconds)	Venue	Date
60 meters	6.75	Vermillion, South Dakota	February 24, 2007
100 meters	10.78	Sioux, Iowa	May 13, 2006

== College career ==
Logan walked on at the University of South Dakota after three years off from football. Logan ran football and track at South Dakota from 2003 to 2006, becoming one of the most accomplished players in University of South Dakota history.

=== 2003 ===
In 2003 Logan joined the program as a running back. Logan immediately started and made an impact with 1,115 rushing yards and 5 rushing touchdowns. Logan was a part of the NCC-Honoree.

=== 2004 ===
As a sophomore Logan ran for 1,345 rushing yards and 3 rushing scores. Logan also made impact in the passing game with 179 yards and 1 touchdown. Logan was a part of the NCC-Honoree for the second straight year. Logan was also an accomplished track runner placing 7th at the NCAA indoor national championship meet. Logan was also a track All American

=== 2005 ===
As a Junior Logan ran for 1,751 rushing yards and 11 rushing touchdowns. Logan kept his title as an all purpose back adding 428 yards and two touchdowns along with 174 total return yards. Logan was James an All American for the first time in his career and was a NCC-Honoree for the 3rd year in a row.

=== 2006 ===
In Logan's final year at the University of South Dakota he ran for 1,707 yards and 9 touchdowns along with 153 yards and 2 scores through the air. Logan also flexed his returning ability with 810 total return yards and 2 return touchdowns. Logan was named an All American for Football and Track, the Most Valuable Offensive Back, and a finalist for the Harlon Hill Trophy. The Division 2 Equivalent of the Heisman Trophy. Logan left as The University of South Dakotas all-time leader in rushing yards. Logan is 14th All Time In Division 2 history for rushing yards with 5,958 and 3rd in yards per carry with 7.7. He is one of 10 Division 2 players to rush for 1,000 yards in all 4 seasons.

In 2016 the University of South Dakota announced that Logan would be in their team's Hall of Fame. In 2018 he was inducted.

== Professional career ==
=== Miami Dolphins ===
Logan was signed as an undrafted free agent by his hometown team, the Miami Dolphins in 2007, but was released prior to the regular season.

=== BC Lions (first stint) ===
Logan signed with the BC Lions of the Canadian Football League for the 2008 CFL season. He rushed 122 times for 889 yards, and made 52 catches for 477 yards and three touchdowns.

=== Pittsburgh Steelers ===
Logan was signed by the Pittsburgh Steelers to compete for a roster spot as a return specialist. Logan finished the 2009 preseason with 5 kickoff returns for 185 yards and 9 punt returns for 191 yards and a touchdown. He also had 2 carries for 27 yards on reverses. Logan was rewarded for his performance with a spot on the 53-man roster. In 2009, he broke the Steelers single-season record for return yards. On September 4, 2010, Logan was released by the Steelers.

=== Detroit Lions ===
Logan was signed by the Detroit Lions on September 5, 2010, one day after he was released by the Steelers. On October 10, 2010, against the Rams, Logan scored a touchdown on a 105-yard kickoff return, tying a Lions team record. Logan was named a Pro Bowl alternate for the NFC during the 2010 NFL season.

=== BC Lions (second stint) ===
Logan re-signed with the Lions on October 15, 2013, to a practice roster agreement. In his first season back in the CFL, Logan played in four games and amassed 236 rushing yards on 33 attempts (7.2 average) and one rushing touchdown. His 2014 season was more fruitful as he was utilized as a change of pace back in conjunction with Andrew Harris. When Harris went down with a season-ending injury, it created an increased role for Logan in the Lions offense. Ultimately, Logan played in 14 regular season games and one playoff game in 2014. He compiled 625 rushing yards on 116 attempts (5.1 average) with one rushing touchdown. He also played a significant role in the passing, with 477 receiving yards on 52 receptions and three touchdowns. He played 18 games over two seasons in his second stint with the Lions before being released on March 2, 2015.

=== Montreal Alouettes ===
On March 9, 2015, Logan signed a contract with the Montreal Alouettes of the Canadian Football League. Logan's contributions on offense with Montreal declined compared to his usage in BC, but Logan became a full time returner for punts, kickoffs, and missed field goals. In 2018, Logan's single rushing opportunity came in Week 2 for a 12-yard gain, putting Logan over 2,000 career rushing yards. He also continued to serve as a consistent threat on special teams; Logan scored a 74-yard punt return touchdown, and became one of only eight players in CFL history accumulate 10,000 total return yards in his career. After playing in 4 games at the start of the 2019 season, the Alouettes announced their release of Logan on July 17 and thanked him for his service. Logan would be named to the all decade Montreal team as a special teamer.

=== Ottawa Redblacks ===
On August 13, 2019, Logan was signed to the practice roster of the Ottawa Redblacks (CFL). Logan was elevated to the active roster; his first game as a Redblack was his 100th career CFL game. Logan missed a few games with injury, but played in eight games for Ottawa as a returner, and pushed his total return yards for his CFL career up to 11,970. Furthermore, Logan moved into 2nd place in the CFL record books for career kickoff return yards.

== Post-playing career ==
Following the 2019 CFL season and nearing his 39th birthday, Logan retired, having played 13 years across 2 leagues, and amassing 20,730 total yards. Logan accepted the position of Running Backs Coach and Special Teams Coordinator at Lock Haven University.

Logan is a professional cyclist.
