= Dave West (entrepreneur) =

British entrepreneur (1944–2014)

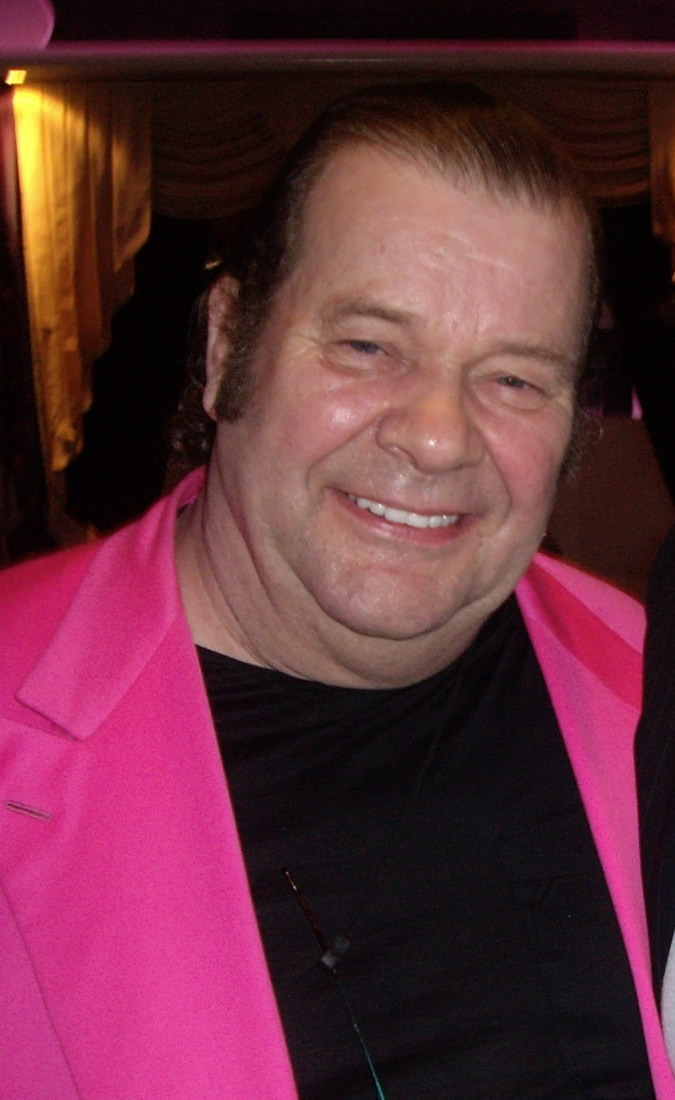
- Born: 14 March 1944; Romford, Essex, England
- Died: 12 December 2014 (aged 70); London, England

Dave West (14 March 1944 – 12 December 2014) was a British entrepreneur with a number of successful business ventures.

== Early life ==
Originally from Romford, Essex, David John West started his career working as a market trader boy. When he was 18, he joined the Merchant Navy.

== Business career ==
West built a family tobacco business in Belgium with his wife and children. In 1980 he founded a wholesale business on a double decker bus in Calais selling cheap alcohol and cigarettes on the back of a lorry. His business moved to permanent premises and was named EastEnders, which is now a part of the largest British owned cash and carry group in Europe. It also has its own house wine labels, "The Dogs Bollocks" and "Menage a Trois".

Upon his return to London in 2002 West opened St James's based nightclub HeyJo and a restaurant Abracadabra. West became the subject of a BBC documentary in 2005 about this project, called Trouble at the Top.

West described himself as a libertarian and nonconformist. He was an active protester against the smoking ban: in August 2007 he hired Cherie Blair in his bid to challenge the ban (introduced by her husband and prime minister at the time, Tony Blair). He declared the ban was an infringement of his customers’ rights to smoke in his club and restaurant.

The following year he paid more than £100,000 to attend David and Victoria Beckham's charity World Cup party, and said that he was subject to such an unwelcoming pre-party briefing that he chose to boycott the event. After winning the bidding for the two tickets in an on-line auction, he was instructed to sign a confidentiality agreement, as well as being banned from handing out his business cards to guests or taking his mobile phone and camera to the party. According to The Independent newspaper, he said: "The confidentiality agreement would mean that, had I signed it, I couldn't talk about the party even to my friends." West insists that such conditions are unheard of and should have been printed on the website prior to the sale of the tickets.

== Death ==
Following a drunken argument with his son (David West Jr), he died from a single knife wound to the heart on 12 December 2014, though his jugular vein had also been cut. His son was arrested and subsequently charged with his murder. Nearby resident Stephen Fry said that he heard "horrifying screams" coming from the house and later saw West's body being carried out. The emergency services laid his body on the street where they tried unsuccessfully to revive him.

David West Jr was sentenced to 13-and-a-half years on 9 November 2015 for his father's manslaughter.
