= Gerry Dattilio =

Canadian gridiron football player (born 1953)

Profile
- Position: Quarterback

Personal information
- Born: June 11, 1953 (age 73); Chomedey, Quebec, Canada
- Listed height: 6 ft 1 in (1.85 m)
- Listed weight: 200 lb (91 kg)

Career information
- College: University of Northern Colorado
- CFL draft: 1975

Career history
- Toronto Argonauts (1975); Montreal Alouettes (1976–1981); Calgary Stampeders (1982–1983); Montreal Concordes (1984–1985)

Awards and highlights
- Grey Cup champion (1977); Most Outstanding Canadian (1980); Jeff Russel Memorial Trophy (1980); CFL East All-Star (1980)

Gerry Dattilio (born June 11, 1953) is a Canadian former professional football quarterback who played in the Canadian Football League (CFL).

== Early life ==
Dattilio played his high school football with the Chomedey Chiefs in the late 1960s and early 1970s, when he won a City Championship by beating St. Thomas High School of Pointe-Claire, Quebec. He also played in the Quebec Junior Football League with the Verdun Maple Leafs.

He attended the University of Northern Colorado playing for the Bears from 1972 to 1974. He led the Bears in rushing as a quarterback in 1972 and 1973 and led the team in passing yards in both 1973 (1,367 yards, 18 touchdowns) and 1974 (1,367 yards, 14 touchdowns). He ranks 10th on the Bears' all-time passing yards list with 2,953 passing yards and was an All-Great Plains Conference player in both 1973 and 1974.

== Professional career ==
In 1975, Dattilio was the first territorial exemption of the Montreal Alouettes, but after a time on the injury list he was released in September and then the next month he signed with the Toronto Argonauts. He played a single game for the Argos and did not record any statistics. The next season, he was released by the Argonauts, rejoined the Alouettes, and served as the third-string quarterback behind Sonny Wade and Joe Barnes. Also as a utility player Dattilio returned punts, but seized the chance at playing more at quarterback in 1978. While he led the team in pass attempts with 142, with 78 completions, that season, he was second in passing yards with 1120. Dattilio also had 9 interceptions and 5 touchdowns. However, in 1979 Barnes was the clear cut starter and with a run heavy offence there was not many opportunities for Dattilio to play. In 1980 that all changed when a struggling Barnes was traded to the Saskatchewan Roughriders after six games. That season Dattilio became an all star quarterback, throwing for 2892 yards and 19 touchdowns and winning the CFL's Most Outstanding Canadian Award and was the eastern nominee for the CFL's Most Outstanding Player Award. He threw 5 touchdowns against the Hamilton Tiger-Cats on September 21, 1980. The next season saw Dattilio demoted to back-up in making way for NFL star quarterback Vince Ferragamo. However Ferragamo struggled for most of the 1981 season and Dattilio played enough to tally 1095 aerial yards, including a 427-yard performance (which stood as a record for yards thrown in a game by a Canadian-born QB for more than 40 years before Nathan Rourke eclipsed the record during the 2022 BC Lions season). Prior to the 1982 season he was traded to the Calgary Stampeders. That year, he threw for 2788 yards, marking the last time (until Nathan Rourke, with BC in 2022) in which a Canadian quarterback threw for over 2000 yards in a season. Dattilio completed 194 out of 387 passes, but he had only 11 touchdowns to 22 interceptions. 1983 saw him used mostly as a back-up, this time to first year quarterback Bernard Quarles, but got in enough playing time to throw for 1213 yards. In March, 1984, Dattilio was traded back to Montreal (by then re-named the Concordes) where he served as a back-up or a third-string quarterback for two more seasons.

Among Canadian quarterbacks Dattilio is second all-time in statistics with 9952 passing yards on 697 completions from 1271 attempts with 53 touchdowns and 79 interceptions. He also had 993 rushing yards on 189 carries and added eight rushing touchdowns. He appeared in three Grey Cup games: 1977, 1978, and 1979, but did not throw any passes. Instead, in 1977, he was used as a receiver and caught two passes for 39 yards in the Alouettes' victory over the Edmonton Eskimos.

He is a business person in Calgary, and was inducted into Northern Colorado Athletic Hall of Fame in 2004 and had the Gerry Dattilio Sportsfield named after him in Laval, Quebec, in honour of his great Chomedy High School playing days.
