= Cam Fraser =

Canadian football player

Profile
- Position: Punter

Personal information
- Born: 1932; Hamilton, Ontario, Canada
- Died: May 16, 1999 (aged 67); Ancaster, Ontario, Canada

Career information
- University: Ottawa

Career history
- 1951–1961: Hamilton Tiger-Cats
- 1962: Montreal Alouettes
- 1969: Hamilton Tiger-Cats

Awards and highlights
- 2× Grey Cup champion (1953, 1957)

Cam Fraser (1932 – May 16, 1999) was a Canadian professional football punter who played for the Hamilton Tiger-Cats of the Canadian Football League from 1951 to 1961. He came out of retirement in 1969 after an injury to Joe Zuger.

Fraser appeared in the 1957 Grey Cup, a 32–7 victory for Hamilton against the Winnipeg Blue Bombers.
