= Tyreik McAllister =

American gridiron football player (born 1998)

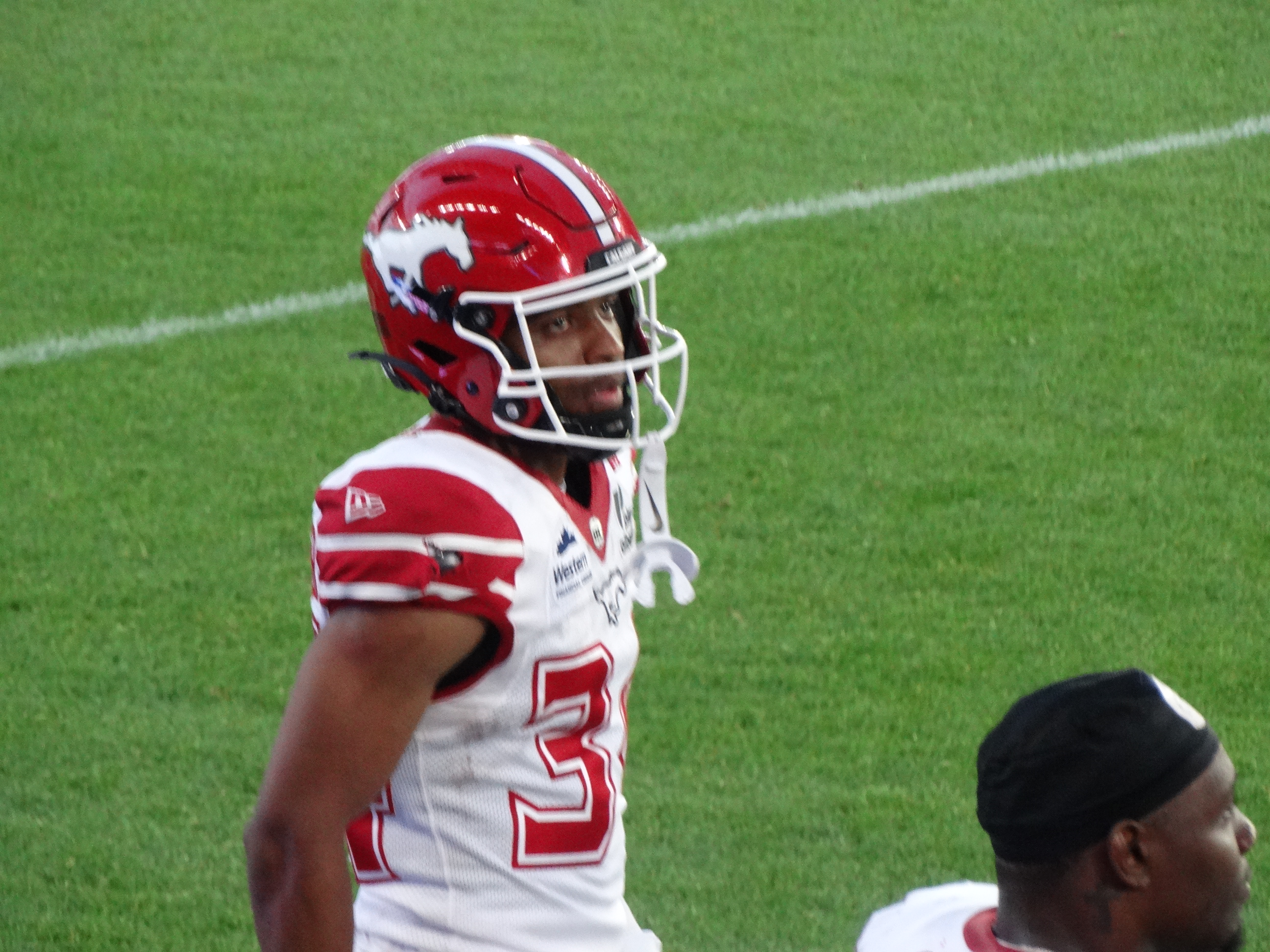
- McAllister with the Calgary Stampeders in 2026

No. 34 – Calgary Stampeders
- Positions: Running back, Return specialist
- Roster status: Active
- CFL status: American

Personal information
- Born: April 7, 1998 (age 28); Latta, South Carolina, U.S.
- Listed height: 5 ft 9 in (1.75 m)
- Listed weight: 183 lb (83 kg)

Career information
- High school: Latta (Latta, South Carolina); Palmetto Prep (Columbia, South Carolina)
- College: Charleston (WV) (2017–2021)
- NFL draft: 2022: undrafted

Career history
- Denver Broncos (2022)*; Hamilton Tiger-Cats (2023); Las Vegas Raiders (2024–2025); Columbus Aviators (2026)*; Calgary Stampeders (2026–present)
- * Offseason or practice squad member only

Career NFL statistics
- Games played: 3
- Carries: 2
- Rushing yards: 11
- Punt returns: 2
- Punt return yards: 24
- Kickoff returns: 2
- Kick return yards: 49
- Stats at Pro Football Reference

Career CFL statistics as of 2026
- Games played: 34
- Kickoff returns: 110
- Kick return yards: 2,607
- Punt returns: 120
- Punt return yards: 1,393
- MFG returns: 13
- MFG return yards: 738
- Return touchdowns: 4
- Stats at CFL.ca

Tyreik McAllister (born April 7, 1998) is an American professional football running back and return specialist for the Calgary Stampeders of the Canadian Football League (CFL). He played college football for the Charleston Golden Eagles and was signed by the Denver Broncos as an undrafted free agent in 2022. He played for the Hamilton Tiger-Cats of the Canadian Football League (CFL) in 2023. He was selected by the Columbus Aviators during the 2026 UFL free agent draft.

== Early life and college ==
McAllister was born on April 7, 1998, in Latta, South Carolina. He attended Latta High School where he competed in football, basketball and track. He was an all-conference football player at Latta and later spent a postgraduate season at Palmetto Prep in Columbia, South Carolina.

McAllister enrolled at the NCAA Division II school the University of Charleston, where he saw playing time for the Charleston Golden Eagles football team as a freshman in 2017. He ran seven times for 23 yards, caught 22 passes for 193 yards and returned 13 kicks for 242 yards that season. In 2018, he caught 20 passes for 276 yards and one touchdown and ran five times for 35 yards. He was chosen first-team All-Mountain East Conference (MEC) in 2019, running for 1,119 yards and 11 touchdowns in 10 games.

During the 2020–21 season, McAllister ran 36 times for 214 yards with two rushing touchdowns, also catching 15 passes for 129 yards while appearing in three games. As a senior in 2021, he ran for 1,090 yards and 13 touchdowns, with an average of 7.62 yards-per-carry that ranked third nationally. He led the MEC in both rushing yards and touchdowns and also totaled 32 receptions for 302 yards, having an all-purpose yards average of 142.8 per game that placed 16th at the Division II level. He was named first-team All-MEC, first-team D2CCA All-Region and the MEC Offensive Player of the Year. Primarily a running back in college, he ended his collegiate career with 2,561 rushing yards and 26 rushing touchdowns with an average of 7.2 yards-per-carry, along with 113 receptions for 1,047 yards and four touchdowns.

== Professional career ==
Pre-draft measurables
Height	Weight	Arm length	Hand span	Wingspan	40-yard dash	10-yard split	20-yard split	20-yard shuttle	Three-cone drill	Vertical jump	Broad jump	Bench press
5 ft 9 1/8 in (1.76 m)	181 lb (82 kg)	30 1/2 in (0.77 m)	9 1/4 in (0.23 m)	6 ft 1 3/4 in (1.87 m)	4.40 s	1.50 s	2.51 s	4.30 s	6.95 s	36.0 in (0.91 m)	10 ft 1 in (3.07 m)	12 reps
All values from Pro Day

=== Denver Broncos ===
After going unselected in the 2022 NFL draft, McAllister signed with the Denver Broncos as an undrafted free agent. He was waived/injured on August 10 and placed on injured reserve with a hamstring injury. McAllister signed with the Broncos' practice squad on November 22. He was released from the practice squad on November 29, re-signed on December 14, and signed a reserve/future contract with Denver after the season on January 9, 2023. He was waived by the Broncos on May 12, re-signed on May 16, and then released on May 31.

=== Hamilton Tiger-Cats ===
On June 14, 2023, McAllister signed with the Hamilton Tiger-Cats of the Canadian Football League (CFL). He made the team and appeared in 16 games, being a top returner for the Tiger-Cats. McAllister totaled 41 kick returns with an average of 25.3 yards, 56 punt returns with an average of 10.8 yards, and seven missed field goal returns for 408 yards and a touchdown. He was converted from running back to slotback by the Tiger-Cats and contributed in a gadget role on offense with 13 rushes for 52 yards and 27 catches for 364 yards and two touchdowns. McAllister was the CFL leader in kick return average and all-purpose yards.

=== Las Vegas Raiders ===
Following the CFL season, McAllister signed a reserve/future contract with the Las Vegas Raiders on January 16, 2024. In the team's preseason finale against the San Francisco 49ers, he returned a punt 81-yards for a touchdown and had a 35-yard touchdown reception. He was waived on November 1, and re-signed to the practice squad.

McAllister signed a reserve/future contract with Las Vegas on January 6, 2025. On May 12, McAllister was waived by the Raiders.

=== Columbus Aviators ===
On January 14, 2026, McAllister was selected by the Columbus Aviators of the United Football League (UFL). He was released by the Aviators on March 19.

=== Calgary Stampeders ===
On March 31, 2026, McAllister signed with the Calgary Stampeders. On July 24, in a game against the Winnipeg Blue Bombers, he became the first player in CFL history to score a touchdown three different ways (rushing, receiving, missed field goal return) in a half and was the third player to do this in a single game.
