= Terry Irvin =

American gridiron football player (born 1954)

Profile
- Position: Defensive back

Personal information
- Born: September 14, 1954 (age 72); Columbia, Mississippi, U.S.

Career information
- College: Jackson State
- NFL draft: 1977: 12th round, 322nd overall pick

Career history
- 1977–1983: Calgary Stampeders
- 1984–1985: Saskatchewan Roughriders
- 1985: Calgary Stampeders
- 1986: Montreal Alouettes

Awards and highlights
- CFL East All-Star (1986); 3× CFL West All-Star (1978, 1979, 1984)

Terry Irvin (born September 14, 1954) is a former football player in the Canadian Football League (CFL) for ten years. Irvin played defensive back for the Calgary Stampeders, Saskatchewan Roughriders and Montreal Alouettes from 1977-1986. He played college football at Jackson State University.

Irvin snagged 62 career interceptions and is third on the All-Time Interception list in the CFL behind Less Browne (87) and Larry Highbaugh (66). He returned 4 for touchdowns (and one touchdown on a fumble.)

Games played, interceptions and fumble recoveries
| Year | Team | GP | Int | Yds | Avg | TDInt | Long | FR | Yds | Avg | TD | Long | FF |
|---|---|---|---|---|---|---|---|---|---|---|---|---|---|
| 1977 | CAL | 9 | 1 | 13 | 13 | 0 | 13 | 1 | 0 | 0 | 0 | 0 | |
| 1978 | CAL | 15 | 7 | 159 | 22.7 | 1 | 73 | 0 | 0 | 0 | 0 | 0 | |
| 1979 | CAL | 16 | 7 | 147 | 21 | 0 | 31 | 2 | 65 | 32.5 | 1 | 65 | |
| 1980 | CAL | 10 | 6 | 67 | 11.2 | 0 | 31 | 0 | 0 | 0 | 0 | 0 | |
| 1981 | CAL | 14 | 6 | 29 | 4.8 | 0 | 13 | 0 | 0 | 0 | 0 | 0 | |
| 1982 | CAL | 16 | 3 | 56 | 18.7 | 1 | 34 | 1 | 0 | 0 | 0 | 0 | |
| 1983 | CAL | 9 | 4 | 2 | 0.5 | 0 | 2 | 0 | 0 | 0 | 0 | 0 | |
| 1984 | SASK | 15 | 11 | 79 | 7.2 | 1 | 42 | 1 | 0 | 0 | 0 | 0 | |
| 1985 | SASK | 13 | 5 | 41 | 8.2 | 1 | 36 | 1 | 0 | 0 | 0 | 0 | |
| 1986 | MON | 18 | 12 | 105 | 8.8 | 0 | 41 | 2 | 17 | 8.5 | 0 | 14 | |

Kickoff and punt returns
| Year | Team | KOR | Yds | Avg | TD | Long | PR | Yds | Avg | TD | Long |
|---|---|---|---|---|---|---|---|---|---|---|---|
| 1977 | CAL | 10 | 201 | 20.1 | 0 | 36 | 0 | 0 | 0 | 0 | 0 |
| 1978 | CAL | 2 | 48 | 24 | 0 | 26 | 0 | 0 | 0 | 0 | 0 |
| 1979 | CAL | 0 | 0 | 0 | 0 | 0 | 0 | 0 | 0 | 0 | 0 |
| 1980 | CAL | 0 | 0 | 0 | 0 | 0 | 1 | 7 | 7 | 0 | 7 |
| 1981 | CAL | 0 | 0 | 0 | 0 | 0 | 0 | 0 | 0 | 0 | 0 |
| 1982 | CAL | 0 | 0 | 0 | 0 | 0 | 1 | 4 | 4 | 0 | 4 |
| 1983 | CAL | 0 | 0 | 0 | 0 | 0 | 0 | 0 | 0 | 0 | 0 |
| 1984 | SASK | 0 | 0 | 0 | 0 | 0 | 0 | 0 | 0 | 0 | 0 |
| 1985 | SASK | 0 | 0 | 0 | 0 | 0 | 0 | 0 | 0 | 0 | 0 |
| 1986 | MON | 0 | 0 | 0 | 0 | 0 | 4 | 41 | 103 | 0 | 27 |

Fumbles
| Year | Team | F | FL | OFR |
|---|---|---|---|---|
| 1977 | CAL | 0 | 0 | 0 |
| 1978 | CAL | 0 | 0 | 0 |
| 1979 | CAL | 0 | 0 | 0 |
| 1980 | CAL | 1 | 0 | 0 |
| 1981 | CAL | 2 | 0 | 1 |
| 1982 | CAL | 0 | 0 | 0 |
| 1983 | CAL | 0 | 0 | 1 |
| 1984 | SASK | 0 | 0 | 0 |
| 1985 | SASK | 0 | 0 | 0 |
| 1986 | MON | 0 | 0 | 0 |
