= Rudy Linterman =

Canadian gridiron football player (born 1947)

No. 17
- Position: Running back

Personal information
- Born: October 30, 1947 (age 79); Calgary, Alberta, Canada
- Listed height: 5 ft 11 in (1.80 m)
- Listed weight: 205 lb (93 kg)

Career information
- College: Idaho

Career history
- 1968–1977: Calgary Stampeders
- 1977: Toronto Argonauts

Awards and highlights
- Grey Cup champion (1971); CFL West All-Star (1974); Dr. Beattie Martin Trophy (1974)

Rudy Linterman (born October 30, 1947) is a Canadian former professional football running back who played for the Calgary Stampeders from 1968 through 1977, and for the Toronto Argonauts in 1977. His nickname was the "flying dutchman". He won the Dr. Beattie Martin Trophy in 1974.

Linterman finished with career totals of 157 games played with 1,399 rushing yards and 4,908 receiving yards and 20 career TDs. Perhaps he is best known for having 68 receiving yards in the terrible weather that accompanied the 1971 Grey Cup.

Rudy was added to the Wall of Fame at McMahon Stadium on September 14, 2012.
