= Donovan Gans =

American football player (born 1971)

No. 49, 35
- Position: Defensive lineman

Personal information
- Born: July 7, 1971 (age 55); Orange, Texas, U.S.
- Listed height: 6 ft 2 in (1.88 m)
- Listed weight: 235 lb (107 kg)

Career information
- College: Texas A&M–Kingsville

Career history
- 1995: Birmingham Barracudas
- 1996: Hamilton Tiger-Cats

Donovan Gans (born July 7, 1971) is an American former football defensive linemen who played one season with the Birmingham Barracudas of the Canadian Football League (CFL). He first enrolled at Colorado State University before transferring to Texas A&M University–Kingsville. He was also a member of the Hamilton Tiger-Cats.

== College career ==
Gans first played college football for the Colorado State Rams. He lettered for the Texas A&M–Kingsville Javelinas from 1993 to 1994.

== Professional career ==
Gans played in 18 games for the Birmingham Barracudas in 1995. He was a member of the CFL's Hamilton Tiger-Cats in 1996.
