= Dave West (Canadian football) =

Canadian gridiron football player (1928–2005)

Profile
- Position: Halfback

Personal information
- Born: May 12, 1928; Canada
- Died: December 23, 2005 (aged 77)
- Listed height: 5 ft 9 in (1.75 m)
- Listed weight: 175 lb (79 kg)

Career information
- College: Tulsa

Career history
- 1948, 1957: Toronto Argonauts
- 1951–1952: Calgary Stampeders
- 1953: Winnipeg Blue Bombers
- 1954–1955: Edmonton Eskimos
- 1956: Toronto Argonauts
- 1957: Hamilton Tiger-Cats
- 1959–1961: Ottawa Rough Riders

Awards and highlights
- Grey Cup champion (1954, 1955, 1960)

Dave West (May 12, 1928 – December 23, 2005) was a Canadian professional football player who played for the Toronto Argonauts, Calgary Stampeders, Winnipeg Blue Bombers, Edmonton Eskimos, Hamilton Tiger-Cats and Ottawa Rough Riders. He won the Grey Cup with Eskimos in 1954 and 1955, and with the Rough Riders in 1960. He attended the University of Tulsa. West retired to Coquitlam, British Columbia and was working at a school library in 1984.
