= Saskatchewan Roughriders all-time records and statistics =

The following is a list of Saskatchewan Roughriders all-time records and statistics current to the 2025 CFL season. Single game records and streaks that occur during the 2026 CFL season are also included. Each category lists the top five players, where known, except for when the fifth place player is tied in which case all players with the same number are listed.

== Grey Cup Championships ==
Most by a player

- 2 - Darian Durant
- 2 - John Chick
- 2 - Mike McCullough
- 2 - Neal Hughes
- 2 - Chris Getzlaf

== Games ==
Most games

- 284 – Gene Makowsky
- 271 – Roger Aldag
- 246 – Ron Lancaster
- 238 – Reg Whitehouse
- 237 – Ron Atchison

Most regular seasons played

- 17 – Ron Atchison – 1952–1968
- 17 – Roger Aldag – 1976–1992
- 17 – Gene Makowsky – 1995–2011
- 16 – Ron Lancaster – 1963–1978
- 15 – Fred Wilson – 1911–1926
- 15 – Bill Clarke – 1951–1965
- 15 – Reg Whitehouse – 1952–1966

== Scoring ==
Most points – career

- 2,374 – Dave Ridgway
- 1,613 – Paul McCallum
- 1,133 – Brett Lauther
- 863 – Jack Abendschan
- 823 – George Reed

Most points – season

- 233 – Dave Ridgway – 1990
- 216 – Dave Ridgway – 1989
- 216 – Dave Ridgway – 1991
- 215 – Dave Ridgway – 1988
- 201 – Brett Lauther – 2024

Most points – game

- 30 – Ferd Burket – versus Winnipeg Blue Bombers, October 26, 1959
- 28 – Dave Ridgway – versus Ottawa Rough Riders, July 29, 1984
- 25 – Dave Ridgway – versus Edmonton Eskimos, August 19, 1984
- 24 – Several tied

Most touchdowns – career

- 137 – George Reed
- 78 – Ray Elgaard
- 75 – Don Narcisse
- 60 – Hugh Campbell
- 55 – Ken Carpenter
- 55 – Weston Dressler

Most touchdowns – season

- 18 – Ken Carpenter – 1955
- 17 – Hugh Campbell – 1966
- 17 – Craig Ellis – 1985
- 17 - Tommy Stevens - 2026
- 16 – Jack Hill – 1958
- 16 – George Reed – 1968
- 16 – Wes Cates – 2010

Most touchdowns – game

- 5 – Ferd Burket – versus Winnipeg Blue Bombers, October 26, 1959
- 4 – Brian Timmis – versus Saskatoon Quakers, October 30, 1920
- 4 – George Reed – versus Edmonton Eskimos, October 30, 1968
- 4 – Milson Jones – versus Winnipeg Blue Bombers, August 31, 1988

Most rushing touchdowns – career

- 134 – George Reed
- 41 – Wes Cates
- 34 – Kent Austin
- 32 – Chris Szarka
- 30 – Milson Jones

Most rushing touchdowns – season

- 17 - Tommy Stevens - 2026
- 16 – George Reed – 1968
- 15 – George Reed – 1967
- 15 – Wes Cates – 2010
- 14 – Craig Ellis – 1985
- 13 – George Reed – 1972

Most rushing touchdowns – game

- 4 – Ferd Burket – versus Winnipeg Blue Bombers, October 26, 1959
- 4 – George Reed – versus Edmonton Eskimos, October 30, 1968
- 4 – Milson Jones – versus Winnipeg Blue Bombers, August 31, 1988

Most touchdown receptions – career

- 78 – Ray Elgaard
- 75 – Don Narcisse
- 60 – Hugh Campbell
- 53 – Jeff Fairholm
- 50 – Weston Dressler

Most touchdown receptions – season

- 17 – Hugh Campbell – 1966
- 14 – Jack Hill – 1958
- 14 – Joey Walters – 1981
- 13 – Jeff Fairholm – 1991
- 13 – Weston Dressler – 2012

Most touchdown receptions – game

- 3 – 21 times, most recently Samuel Emilus – versus BC Lions, June 13, 2026

Most kickoff return touchdowns – career

- 4 – Mario Alford (2022–25)
- 2 – Demetris Bendross (2000–02)
- 2 – Marcus Thigpen (2009, 2017–19)

Most kickoff return touchdowns – season

- 2 – Mario Alford – 2022
- 2 – Demetris Bendross – 2000

Most punt return touchdowns – career

- 5 – Corey Holmes (2001–05, 2007)
- 4 – Mario Alford (2022–25)
- 3 – Willis Jacox (1987, 1991–92)
- 3 – Weston Dressler (2008–15)
- 3 – Christion Jones (2017–19)
- 3 – Curtis Mayfield (1996–1999)

Most punt return touchdowns – season

- 3 – Mario Alford – 2023
- 3 – Willis Jacox – 1991
- 3 – Curtis Mayfield – 1999
- 3 – Corey Holmes – 2005

Most punt return touchdowns – game

- 2 – Curtis Mayfield – versus Winnipeg Blue Bombers, September 5, 1999
- 2 – Mario Alford – versus Calgary Stampeders, July 15, 2023

== Passing ==
Most passing yards – career

- 46,710 – Ron Lancaster
- 28,507 – Darian Durant
- 26,626 – Kent Austin
- 14,457 - Trevor Harris
- 14,387 – Frank Tripucka

Most passing yards – season

- 6,225 – Kent Austin – 1992
- 5,754 – Kent Austin – 1993
- 5,542 – Darian Durant – 2010
- 5,370 - Trevor Harris – 2026
- 4,647 – Henry Burris – 2000

Most passing yards – game

- 559 – Kent Austin – versus BC Lions, August 13, 1992 (OT)
- 546 – Kent Austin – versus Calgary Stampeders, October 23, 1993
- 507 – Kent Austin – versus Winnipeg Blue Bombers, Sept 8, 1991 (OT)
- 507 – Kent Austin – versus Toronto Argonauts, October 31, 1993
- 500 – Darian Durant – versus Calgary Stampeders, September 17, 2010

Most pass attempts – career

- 5,834 – Ron Lancaster
- 3,584 – Darian Durant
- 3,413 – Kent Austin
- 1,785 – Frank Tripucka
- 1,634 – Tom Burgess

Most pass attempts – season

- 770 – Kent Austin – 1992
- 715 – Kent Austin – 1993
- 644 – Darian Durant – 2010
- 618 – Kent Austin – 1990
- 615 – Trevor Harris – 2026

Most pass attempts – game

- 65 – Kent Austin – versus Edmonton Eskimos, September 15, 1991
- 62 – Joe Adams – versus Toronto Argonauts, July 29, 1983
- 62 – Kent Austin – versus BC Lions, August 13, 1992 (OT)
- 62 – Darian Durant – versus Montreal Alouettes, August 6, 2010
- 60 – Kent Austin – versus Edmonton Eskimos, July 15, 1992 (OT)

Most pass completions – career

- 3,186 – Ron Lancaster
- 2,226 – Darian Durant
- 1,964 – Kent Austin
- 1,634 – Tom Burgess
- 1,143 – Trevor Harris

Most pass completions – season

- 459 – Kent Austin – 1992
- 431 – Trevor Harris – 2026
- 405 – Kent Austin – 1993
- 391 – Darian Durant – 2010
- 360 – Kent Austin – 1990

Most pass completions – game

- 41 – Kent Austin – versus Toronto Argonauts, October 31, 1993
- 40 – Kent Austin – versus BC Lions, August 13, 1992 (OT)
- 39 – Kent Austin – versus Calgary Stampeders, July 8, 1992
- 38 – Joe Paopao – versus Montreal Alouettes, July 19, 1985

Most passing touchdowns – career

- 299 – Ron Lancaster
- 151 – Kent Austin
- 149 – Darian Durant
- 83 – Frank Tripucka
- 82 - Trevor Harris

Most passing touchdowns – season

- 35 – Kent Austin – 1992
- 32 – Kent Austin – 1991
- 32 – Trevor Harris – 2026
- 31 – Kent Austin – 1993
- 31 – Darian Durant – 2013

Most passing touchdowns – game

- 6 – Kent Austin – versus BC Lions, September 21, 1991
- 5 – Several tied

Most consecutive regular season games with a touchdown pass

- 14 – Kent Austin (1993)
- 13 – Glenn Dobbs (1993)
- 13 – Kent Austin (1992)
- 12 - Trevor Harris (2026)
- 11 – Ron Lancaster (1969)
- 11 – Kent Austin (1991)

Best completion percentage – career (minimum 500 attempts)

- 71.3 – Trevor Harris (2023–26)
- 70.5 – Cody Fajardo (2019–22)
- 62.9 – Kevin Glenn (2001–03, 2015, 2017)
- 62.1 – Darian Durant (2006–16)
- 59.9 – Nealon Greene (2002–05)

Best completion percentage – season (minimum 100 attempts)

- 73.6 – Trevor Harris (2025)
- 72.4 – Trevor Harris (2024)
- 71.5 – Cody Fajardo (2019)
- 70.3 – Cody Fajardo (2022)

Best completion percentage – game (minimum 20 attempts)

- 85.7 – Cody Fajardo – (30/35) – versus Ottawa Redblacks, August 21, 2021

== Rushing ==
Most rushing attempts – career

- 3,233 – George Reed
- 904 – Wes Cates
- 872 – Mike Saunders
- 833 – Bobby Marlow
- 610 – Kenton Keith

Most rushing attempts – season

- 323 – George Reed – 1975
- 302 – George Reed – 1967
- 292 – Robert Mimbs – 1996
- 288 – George Reed – 1974
- 287 – Kory Sheets – 2013

Most rushing attempts – game

- 34 – George Reed – versus Hamilton Tiger-Cats, August 8, 1970
- 34 – George Reed – versus Winnipeg Blue Bombers, October 12, 1975
- 33 – George Reed – versus Edmonton Eskimos, September 30, 1973

Most rushing yards – career

- 16,116 – George Reed
- 4,761 – Wes Cates
- 4,396 – Mike Saunders
- 4,291 – Bobby Marlow
- 3,811 – Kenton Keith

Most rushing yards – season (all 1,000 yard rushers included)

- 1,768 – George Reed – 1965
- 1,598 – Kory Sheets – 2013
- 1,471 – George Reed – 1967
- 1,454 – George Reed – 1975
- 1,447 – George Reed – 1974
- 1,409 – George Reed – 1966
- 1,403 – Robert Mimbs – 1996
- 1,390 – Ed Buchanan – 1964
- 1,353 – George Reed – 1969
- 1,306 – Mike Strickland – 1978
- 1,285 – Tim McCray – 1989
- 1,277 – Kory Sheets – 2012
- 1,254 – Cookie Gilchrist – 1958
- 1,243 – Darren Davis – 2001
- 1,229 – Wes Cates – 2008
- 1,222 – George Reed – 1968
- 1,222 – A. J. Ouellette – 2025
- 1,205 – Mike Saunders – 1994
- 1,193 – George Reed – 1973
- 1,154 – Kenton Keith – 2004
- 1,146 – George Reed – 1971
- 1,093 – William Powell – 2019
- 1,069 – George Reed – 1972
- 1,054 – Wes Cates – 2010
- 1,037 – Kenton Keith – 2006
- 1,024 – Darren Davis – 2000
- 1,012 – George Reed – 1964

Most rushing yards – game

- 268 – George Reed – versus BC Lions, October 24, 1965
- 225 – Curt Schave – versus Saskatoon Hilltops, September 26, 1931
- 220 – Darren Davis – versus Calgary Stampeders, October 28, 2001
- 207 – Ryquell Armstead – at Calgary Stampeders, September 20, 2024
- 199 – George Reed – versus Hamilton Tiger-Cats, August 8, 1970

Longest run

- 98 – Alex Bravo – versus BC Lions, September 29, 1956
- 93 – Ray Purdin – versus Montreal Alouettes, September 12, 1962
- 93 – Ed Buchanan – versus Calgary Stampeders, August 3, 1964
- 90 – Van Valkenberg – versus Calgary Stampeders, August 20, 1976
- 85 – Ed Buchanan – versus Ottawa Rough Riders, September 10, 1967

== Receiving ==
Most receiving yards – career

- 13,189 – Ray Elgaard
- 12,336 – Don Narcisse
- 7,792 – Weston Dressler
- 6,171 – Jeff Fairholm
- 5,697 – Chris Getzlaf

Most receiving yards – season

- 1,715 – Joey Walters – 1981
- 1,692 – Joey Walters – 1982
- 1,560 – Curtis Marsh – 2000
- 1,494 – Ray Elgaard – 1990
- 1,444 – Ray Elgaard – 1992

Most receiving yards – game

- 260 – Chris DeFrance – versus Edmonton Eskimos, August 5, 1983
- 255 – Andy Fantuz – versus Calgary Stampeders, September 17, 2010
- 244 – Jeff Fairholm – versus Toronto Argonauts, September 26, 1992
- 240 – Andy Fantuz – versus Hamilton Tiger-Cats, October 14, 2007
- 231 – Steve Adkins – versus Saskatoon Hilltops, October 4, 1934
- 231 – Duron Carter – versus Ottawa Redblacks, October 13, 2017

Most 100+ receiving yard games, career

- 40 – Ray Elgaard
- 33 – Don Narcisse
- 25 – Joey Walters
- 25 – Weston Dressler
- 20 – Jeff Fairholm

Most receptions – career

- 919 – Don Narcisse
- 830 – Ray Elgaard
- 538 – Weston Dressler
- 384 – Dan Farthing
- 368 – Chris Getzlaf

Most receptions – season

- 123 – Don Narcisse – 1995
- 108 – KeeSean Johnson – 2026
- 102 – Joey Walters – 1981
- 102 – Craig Ellis – 1985
- 102 – Curtis Marsh – 2000
- 95 – Don Narcisse – 1998

Most receptions – game

- 15 – Don Narcisse – versus Toronto Argonauts, October 31, 1993
- 14 – Joey Walters – versus Winnipeg Blue Bombers, October 21, 1979
- 14 – Craig Ellis – versus Montreal Concordes, July 19, 1985
- 13 – several tied, most recently Weston Dressler – versus Hamilton Tiger-Cats, June 29, 2012

Longest reception

- 107 – Jeff Fairholm – versus Winnipeg Blue Bombers, September 2, 1990
- 106 – Willis Jacox – versus Calgary Stampeders, July 18, 1991
- 104 – Ray Purdin – versus Hamilton Tiger-Cats, October 15, 1962
- 102 – Gord Barwell – versus BC Lions, October 24, 1965

== Interceptions ==
Most interceptions – career

- 51 – Glen Suitor
- 38 – Ken McEachern
- 35 – Bruce Bennett
- 33 – Ted Dushinski
- 32 – Albert Brown
- 32 – Bob Kosid

Most interceptions – season

- 11 – Terry Irvin – 1984
- 10 – Dale West – 1963
- 10 – Ken McEachern – 1980
- 10 – Ed Gainey – 2017
- 9 – James Patrick – 2010

Most interceptions – game

- 4 – Ed Gainey – versus BC Lions, August 13, 2017
- 3 – Several tied, most recently – Macho Harris – versus Montreal Alouettes, September 27, 2015

Most interceptions return yards – career

- 801 – Ken McEachern
- 667 – Glen Suitor
- 606 – Bruce Bennett
- 558 – Albert Brown

Most interceptions return yards – season

- 226 – Dale West – 1963
- 205 – Tevaughn Campbell – 2025
- 198 – Harry Skipper – 1987
- 195 – Lewis Cook – 1972
- 190 – Ken McEachern – 1980

Most interceptions return yards – game

- 135 – Lewis Cook – versus Calgary Stampeders, August 27, 1972
- 112 – Bruce Bennett – versus Calgary Stampeders, August 27, 1972
- 112 – Tevaughn Campbell – versus Winnipeg Blue Bombers, August 31, 2025
- 107 – Josh Woods – versus Hamilton Tiger-Cats, July 12, 2026
- 105 – Paul Kirk – versus Calgary Bronks, September 19, 1936

Longest interception return

- 112 – Bruce Bennett – versus Calgary Stampeders, August 27, 1972
- 112 – Tevaughn Campbell – versus Winnipeg Blue Bombers, August 31, 2025
- 107 – Josh Woods – versus Hamilton Tiger-Cats, July 12, 2026
- 105 – Paul Kirk – versus Calgary Bronks, September 19, 1936
- 102 – Frank Dark – versus BC Lions, October 28, 1979
- 101 – Chappie O'Conner – at Winnipegs, October 31, 1936

== Quarterback sacks ==
- Note: Sacks were first recorded in 1981.

Most sacks – career

- 140 – Bobby Jurasin
- 85.5 – Vince Goldsmith
- 68 – Gary Lewis
- 53 – John Chick
- 35 – Scott Schultz
- 35 – Charleston Hughes

Most sacks – season

- 22 – Bobby Jurasin – 1987
- 20 – Vince Goldsmith – 1983
- 18.5 – Vince Goldsmith – 1981
- 17 – George Wells – 1975

Most sacks – game

- 5 – Neal Smith – at Calgary Stampeders, July 7, 1999
- 4 – Vince Goldsmith – vs. Edmonton Eskimos, September 18, 1983

== Tackles ==
- Note: Tackles were first recorded in 1987, but there was no differentiation between Defensive and Special Teams tackles. Those categorical differences were added in 1991.

Most defensive tackles – career

- 493 – Omarr Morgan
- 488 – Eddie Davis
- 452 – Reggie Hunt
- 428 – Eddie Lowe
- 414 – Dan Rashovich

Most defensive tackles – season

- 120 – Darnell Sankey – 2022
- 118 – Dave Albright – 1987
- 114 – Jeff Knox Jr. – 2015
- 105 – George White – 2000
- 105 – Barrin Simpson – 2010
- 105 – Jerrell Freeman – 2011

Most defensive tackles – game

- 16 – Reggie Hunt – at Winnipeg Blue Bombers, July 10, 2003
- 13 – Eddie Lowe – vs. BC Lions, August 5, 1984
- 13 – Eddie Lowe – at BC Lions, September 28, 1985
- 13 – Antoine Brooks Jr. – vs. BC Lions, June 13, 2026

Most special teams tackles – career

- 153 – Dan Rashovich
- 113 – Mike McCullough
- 100 – Neal Hughes
- 95 – Bruce Boyko
- 78 – David Pitcher

Most special teams tackles – season

- 32 – Ray Bernard – 1992

== Kickoff returns ==
Most kickoff returns – career

- 185 – Corey Holmes (2001–05, 2007)
- 165 – Mario Alford (2022–25)
- 146 – Tristan Jackson (2011–15)
- 127 – Albert Brown (1987–95)
- 102 – Dwight Edwards (1980–83)

Most kickoff returns – season

- 58 – Willis Jacox – 1991
- 51 – Mario Alford – 2023
- 49 – Loucheiz Purifoy – 2019
- 48 – Aaron Ruffin – 1995

Most kickoff returns – game

- 9 – Brandon West – versus BC Lions, September 24, 2011

Most kickoff return yards – career

- 4,124 – Mario Alford (2022–25)
- 4,077 – Corey Holmes (2001–05, 2007)
- 3,435 – Tristan Jackson (2011–15)
- 2,687 – Albert Brown (1987–95)
- 2,248 – Dwight Edwards (1980–83)

Most kickoff return yards – season

- 1,231 – Willis Jacox – 1991
- 1,201 – Loucheiz Purifoy – 2019
- 1,157 – Corey Holmes – 2005
- 1,157 – Mario Alford – 2023
- 1,077 – Mario Alford – 2024

Most kickoff return yards – game

- 231 – Brandon West – versus BC Lions, September 24, 2011

Longest kickoff return – game

- 115 – Bobby Thompson – versus BC Lions, October 24, 1971
- 101 – Mario Alford – versus Edmonton Eskimos, August 3, 2024
- 100 – Marcus Thigpen – versus BC Lions, July 20, 2019

== Punt returns ==
Most punt returns – career

- 539 – Gene Wlasiuk (1959–67)
- 284 – Corey Holmes (2001–05, 2007)
- 256 – Jim Walter (1970–73)
- 256 – Stewart Fraser (1980–85)
- 255 – Mario Alford (2022–25)

Most punt returns – season

- 89 – Mario Alford – 2023
- 86 – Willis Jacox – 1991
- 84 – Gene Wlasiuk – 1966

Most punt returns – game

- 12 – Jim Walter – at BC Lions, September 18, 1970

Most punt return yards – career

- 3,440 – Corey Holmes (2001–05, 2007)
- 3,296 – Gene Wlasiuk (1959–67)
- 2,785 – Mario Alford (2022–25)
- 2,008 – Jim Walter (1970–73)
- 1,882 – Stewart Fraser (1980–85)

Most punt return yards – season

- 1,063 – Willis Jacox – 1991
- 1,023 – Corey Holmes – 2002
- 980 – Mario Alford – 2023

Most punt return yards – game

- 192 – Willis Jacox – versus Ottawa Rough Riders, October 21, 1991
- 184 – Mario Alford – versus Calgary Stampeders, July 15, 2023
- 181 – Corey Holmes – versus Toronto Argonauts, September 15, 2002

Longest punt return – game

- 109 – Herb Johnson – versus Edmonton Eskimos, August 31, 1953
- 108 – Willis Jacox – versus Toronto Argonauts, September 9, 1991
- 107 – Willis Jacox – at Toronto Argonauts, September 9, 1991
- 107 – Mario Alford – at Ottawa Redblacks, September 22, 2023
- 104 – Mario Alford – versus Calgary Stampeders, October 22, 2022

== Field goals ==
Most field goals – career

- 574 – Dave Ridgway (1982–95)
- 368 – Paul McCallum (1994–2005, 2015)
- 302 – Brett Lauther (2018–19, 2021–26)
- 166 – Luca Congi (2006–11)
- 159 – Jack Abendschan (1965–75)

Most field goals – season

- 59 – Dave Ridgway (1990)
- 55 – Dave Ridgway (1988)
- 54 – Terry Baker (1989)
- 54 – Brett Lauther (2018)
- 53 – Brett Lauther (2024)

Most field goals – game

- 8 – Dave Ridgway – versus Edmonton Eskimos, July 23, 1988
- 8 – Dave Ridgway – at Ottawa Rough Riders, July 29, 1984
- 7 – Bob Macoritti – versus Toronto Argonauts, August 27, 1978
- 7 – Dave Ridgway – versus BC Lions, July 29, 1984
- 7 – Dave Ridgway – at BC Lions, August 2, 1990
- 7 – Dave Ridgway – versus Edmonton Eskimos, August 19, 1990
- 7 – Paul McCallum – versus Edmonton Eskimos, September 28, 1997
- 7 – Luca Congi – versus Hamilton Tiger-Cats, July 1, 2010
- 7 – Brett Lauther – versus Ottawa Redblacks, September 28, 2024

Most field goals 50+ yards, career

- 32 – Dave Ridgway (1982–95)
- 29 – Paul McCallum (1994–2005, 2015)
- 26 – Brett Lauther (2018–19, 2021–26)
- 7 – Luca Congi (2006–11)
- 4 – Bob Macoritti (1965–75)

Highest field goal accuracy – career (minimum 100 attempts)

- 82.07% (302/368) – Brett Lauther (2018–19, 2021–26)
- 81.50% (141/173) – Christopher Milo (2011–15)
- 79.43% (166/209) – Luca Congi (2006–11)
- 77.99% (574/736) – Dave Ridgway (1982–95)
- 75.88% (368/485) – Paul McCallum (1994–2005, 2015)

Highest field goal accuracy – season (minimum 30 attempts)

- 90.57% (48/53) – Dave Ridgway (1993)
- 90.00% (54/60) – Brett Lauther (2018)
- 88.89% (32/36) – Christopher Milo (2015)
- 88.46% (46/52) – Christopher Milo (2013)
- 86.36% (38/44) – Luca Congi (2006)
- 86.36% (38/44) – Luca Congi (2008)

Longest field goal

- 63 yards – Paul McCallum – versus Edmonton Eskimos, October 27, 2001
- 60 yards – Dave Ridgway – versus Winnipeg Blue Bombers, September 6, 1987
- 59 yards – Paul Watson – versus Winnipeg Blue Bombers, July 12, 1981
- 59 yards – Brett Lauther – versus Hamilton Tiger-Cats, August 16, 2025
- 58 yards – Paul McCallum – versus Hamilton Tiger-Cats, October 24, 1999

Most consecutive field goals

- 28 – Dave Ridgway (1993)
- 28 – Christopher Milo (2013)
- 23 – Brett Lauther (2024–25)
- 21 – Dave Ridgway (1991–92)
- 21 – Luca Congi (2006)

== Singles ==
Most singles – career

- 111 – Dave Ridgway (1982–95)
- 104 – Paul McCallum (1994–2005, 2015)
- 92 – Fred Wilson (1911–1926)
- 72 – Jack Abendschan (1965–75)

Most singles – season

- 23 – Fred Wilson – 1913
- 20 – Glenn Dobbs – 1952
- 19 – Butch Avinger – 1952
- 19 – Larry Isbell – 1956
- 19 – Paul Watson – 1981
- 19 – Paul McCallum – 2002

== Team statistics ==
=== Most points in a game by the Roughriders ===
- 58 - Ottawa 22 at Saskatchewan 58, August 7, 1989
- 56 - Winnipeg 4 at Saskatchewan 56, September 3, 1995
- 56 - Winnipeg 23 at Saskatchewan 56, September 1, 1991
- 56 - Saskatchewan 56 at Edmonton 8, August 28, 1964
- 55 - Saskatchewan 55 at Winnipeg 10, September 13, 2009
- 55 - Edmonton 9 at Saskatchewan 55, October 25, 2008
- 55 - Winnipeg 11 at Saskatchewan 55, September 2, 1990
- 54 - Saskatchewan 54 at Edmonton 31, August 25, 2017
- 54 - Edmonton 14 at Saskatchewan 54, July 28, 2007
- 54 - Montreal 51 at Saskatchewan 54 (2 OT), July 1, 2010
- 54 - Saskatchewan 54 at Edmonton 52 (4 OT), October 28, 2000
- 53 - Calgary 8 at Saskatchewan 53, October 3, 1982
- 52 - Winnipeg 0 at Saskatchewan 52, September 2, 2012
- 52 - Calgary 52 at Saskatchewan 52 (4 OT), July 28, 2000
- 52 - Hamilton 16 at Saskatchewan 52, July 26, 1991
- 51 - Saskatchewan 51 at Hamilton 8, August 26, 2006
- 51 - Ottawa 41 at Saskatchewan 51, August 17, 2003
- 50 - British Columbia 18 at Saskatchewan 50, October 24, 1971

=== Roughriders' largest margins of victory ===
- 52 - Winnipeg 0 at Saskatchewan 52, September 2, 2012
- 52 - Winnipeg 4 at Saskatchewan 56, September 3, 1995
- 48 - Saskatchewan 56 at Edmonton 8, August 28, 1964
- 47 - Saskatchewan 47 at Winnipeg 0, October 15, 1949
- 46 - Edmonton 9 at Saskatchewan 55, October, 25 2008
- 45 - Saskatchewan 55 at Winnipeg 10, September 13, 2009
- 45 - Calgary 8 at Saskatchewan 53, October 3, 1982
- 44 - Winnipeg 11 at Saskatchewan 55, September 2, 1990
- 44 - Montreal 0 at Saskatchewan 44, September 5, 1966
- 43 - Saskatchewan 51 at Hamilton 8, August 26, 2006
- 41 - Calgary 8 at Saskatchewan 49, July 8, 2007
- 40 - Edmonton 14 at Saskatchewan 54, July 28, 2007
- 40 - Edmonton 0 at Saskatchewan 40, August 15, 1976

=== Roughriders' shutouts ===
- 52-0 - Winnipeg at Saskatchewan, September 2, 2012
- 47-0 - Saskatchewan at Winnipeg, October 15, 1949
- 44-0 - Montreal at Saskatchewan, September 5, 1966
- 40-0 - Edmonton at Saskatchewan, August 21, 1976
- 37-0 - Hamilton at Saskatchewan, July 21, 2013
- 33-0 - Calgary at Saskatchewan, October 27, 1956
- 32-0 - Montreal at Saskatchewan, September 7, 1964
- 23-0 - Edmonton at Saskatchewan, August 27, 1951
- 21-0 - Calgary at Saskatchewan, October 9, 1950
- 17-0 - Saskatchewan at British Columbia, August 30, 1954

=== Highest single game home attendance ===
- 55,438 – Calgary 20 at Saskatchewan 25, October 14, 1995
- 44,910 - Winnipeg 25 at Saskatchewan 48, September 1, 2013
- 43,613 – Calgary 22 at Saskatchewan 24, October 13, 2003
- 40,637 – Montreal 21 at Saskatchewan 24, August 17, 2013
- 40,320 – Winnipeg 36 at Saskatchewan 18, August 31, 2003
- 39,373 - BC 24 at Saskatchewan 22, September 29, 2013
- 37,372 – Hamilton 0 at Saskatchewan 37, July 21, 2013
- 35,579 - Edmonton 9 at Saskatchewan 14, October 12, 2013
- 35,296 – Calgary 21 at Saskatchewan 36, July 5, 2013
