= Don Narcisse =

American gridiron football player (born 1965)

No. 80
- Position: Wide receiver

Personal information
- Born: February 26, 1965 (age 61); Port Arthur, Texas, U.S.

Career information
- College: Texas Southern

Career history

Playing
- 1987–1999: Saskatchewan Roughriders

Coaching
- 2000: San Antonio Matadors

Awards and highlights
- Grey Cup champion (1989); 4× CFL All-Star (1989, 1990, 1995, 1998); 5× CFL West All-Star (1989, 1990, 1993, 1995, 1998)
- Canadian Football Hall of Fame (Class of 2010)

Donald Narcisse (born February 26, 1965) is a former wide receiver for the Saskatchewan Roughriders in the Canadian Football League (CFL). He played college football at Texas Southern University. He signed with the Arizona Cardinals of the National Football League as an undrafted free agent in May, 1987. He was released by the Cardinals at the end of training camp. He then signed with Saskatchewan as a free agent on September 1, 1987.

A relatively small player at 5 feet 9 inches (175 cm) and 170 pounds (77 kg), Narcisse was effective at short-yardage plays, often in situations needing a first down. He was rarely injured, which, combined with his strong on-field performance, led to his holding or sharing several records. He had over 1,000 receiving yards for seven consecutive seasons from 1989 to 1995 including a career-high 1419 yards in 1989. Despite his consistency, the Roughriders were frequently an average team in the middle or bottom half of the standings. He played alongside Ray Elgaard and Jeff Fairholm, and together they were among the best groups of receivers in the league.

At the time of his retirement, he was first all-time in career receptions, third in career receiving yards, and his eight seasons with more than 1000 yards put him in a first-place tie for that record as well. Narcisse holds the professional football record for most consecutive games with at least one reception in every game (216). He is considered one of the greatest players in Roughriders history and one of the league's greatest receivers.

Narcisse was a popular and respected man due to his positive and warm nature towards fans, players and media. His community involvement became much appreciated throughout his career. His most well-known contribution was the "Catch For Kids" program with SaskEnergy on behalf of Kidsport Saskatchewan which began in 1998. The program has evolved to include a charity Saskatchewan Roughrider player calendar, as well as charity bowling event which today raises more than $100,000 annually for Kidsport. That same season, the Leader Post newspaper ranked him as No. 7 on their list of 50 greatest Roughrider players. He won a Grey Cup with the Riders in 1989 and reached the finals again in 1997. After spending his entire career with the Roughriders, Narcisse retired at the conclusion of the 1999 season.

In 2000, Narcisse coached for the San Antonio Matadors of the Spring Football League.

In 2003, Narcisse was voted into the Saskatchewan Roughriders Plaza of Honour. Three years later in 2006, Narcisse was among 185 players nominated for The TSN/CFL 50 Greatest Players list. He was not voted into the top 50. He was among the 135 players Honour Roll of those who didn't make the list. He was inducted into the Canadian Football Hall of Fame in 2010.

== CFL ==
13 seasons: 1987–1999

Regular-season stats

- 216 games, 919 receptions, 75 touchdowns, 12,366 yards
- 8 – more than 1,000 yard seasons, 2 – more than 900 yards seasons
- 34 – more than 100 yard games
- Led CFL in receptions (123) – 1995

Playoffs stats

- Grey Cup: 2 games, 12 receptions, 158 yards, 1 TD
- Overall: 9 games, 41 receptions, 560 yards, 2 TD

Awards & Honors

- Grey Cups – won > 1989, lost > 1997
- CFL All-Star: 1989, 1990, 1995, 1998
- Division All-Star: 1989, 1990, 1993, 1995, 1998
- Roughriders nominee for Most Outstanding CFL Player in 1995
- Molson Cup – Roughriders Most Popular Player – 1994, 1995, 1998

Records

- 1st – (11) – Most seasons with pass reception in all games
- 1st – (216) – Most consecutive games with pass receptions, regular season
- 2nd – (216) – Most games with pass receptions, regular season
- Tied 2nd – (15) Most pass receptions in a regular-season game
- 3rd – (123) Most pass receptions in a regular season
- 3rd – (7) – Most consecutive more than 1,000 pass receiving yard seasons
- 4th – (919) – Most pass receptions, all-time regular season

== U.S. college ==
- In senior season at Texas Southern > 88 receptions, 1,074 yards
- 1986 NCAA Division I-AA receiving crown
- Named First-Team NCAA Division I All-American, All-Southwest Conference

CFL career statistics
| Year | Rec | Yrd | Avg | Lg | TD |
|---|---|---|---|---|---|
| 1987 | 25 | 319 | 12.8 | 43 | 1 |
| 1988 | 21 | 288 | 13.7 | 22 | 0 |
| 1989 | 81 | 1419 | 17.5 | 74 | 11 |
| 1990 | 86 | 1129 | 13.1 | 47 | 9 |
| 1991 | 76 | 1043 | 13.7 | 59 | 7 |
| 1992 | 80 | 1034 | 12.9 | 65 | 7 |
| 1993 | 83 | 1171 | 14.1 | 44 | 9 |
| 1994 | 72 | 1004 | 13.9 | 40 | 8 |
| 1995 | 123 | 1288 | 10.5 | 40 | 8 |
| 1996 | 66 | 906 | 13.7 | 77 | 4 |
| 1997 | 64 | 950 | 14.8 | 47 | 5 |
| 1998 | 95 | 1215 | 12.8 | 44 | 7 |
| 1999 | 47 | 600 | 12.8 | 31 | 1 |
| Total | 919 | 12366 | 13.5 | 77 | 75 |
