= Getzlaf =

Getzlaf is a surname. Notable people with the surname include:

- Chris Getzlaf (born 1983), Canadian football player
- Ryan Getzlaf (born 1985), Canadian ice hockey player
