= Corey Holmes =

American gridiron football player (born 1976)

Profile
- Positions: Running back, Slotback, kick returner

Personal information
- Born: November 19, 1976 (age 49); Greenville, Mississippi, U.S.
- Listed height: 5 ft 8 in (1.73 m)
- Listed weight: 190 lb (86 kg)

Career information
- College: Mississippi Valley State

Career history
- 2001–2005: Saskatchewan Roughriders
- 2006–2007: Hamilton Tiger-Cats
- 2007: Saskatchewan Roughriders

Awards and highlights
- Grey Cup champion (2007); John Agro Special Teams Award (2002, 2005); Jeff Nicklin Memorial Trophy (2005); 2× CFL All-Star (2002, 2005); 2× CFL West All-Star (2002, 2005)

Career statistics
- Games played: 92
- Rushing yards: 2,579
- Receiving yards: 1,980
- Punt return yards: 3,639
- Kick return yards: 4,973
- Touchdowns: 24
- Stats at CFL.ca (archive)

Corey Holmes (born November 19, 1976) is an American former professional football running back and the former mayor of Metcalfe, Mississippi. He is a Grey Cup champion, having won with the Saskatchewan Roughriders in 2007. He is also a two-time CFL All-Star, two-time Special Teams Player of the Year, and was named the West Division's Most Outstanding Player in 2005.

== College career ==
Holmes attended Mississippi Valley State University and played eight games in his senior season with the Delta Devils. He was named SWAC all-Conference and SWAC all-American Player of the Year. He had 1,167 yards on 189 carries and finished the year with 10 touchdowns. He led the team in scoring for the season with 60 points and he played on special teams. In 2014, Holmes was inducted into the Mississippi Valley State Hall of Fame.

== CFL career ==
=== Saskatchewan Roughriders ===
Holmes was signed on June 8, 2001, by the Saskatchewan Roughriders. He made one appearance in his rookie season, in week 5. He had one carry for three yards, two kickoff returns for 48 yards and four punt returns for 42 yards. He spent the remainder of the season dressed as a backup or on the practice roster.

Holmes had a breakthrough year in 2002, as he led the team with seven touchdowns, 1,035 kickoff return yards, and 1,023 punt return yards. He was also named a Western Division all-star, Special Teams Player of the Year and MVP of the Roughriders as voted on by the players.

Holmes played in only 10 games in an injury plagued 2003 season. Despite the missed time, he was still nominated for the Most Outstanding Special Teams Player and he was healthy for the playoffs. 2004 was a healthy and productive season for Holmes. He dressed in all 18 regular season games and both play-off games. He finished the season with 635 rushing yards, 536 receiving yards and led the league with 2,704 combined yards. He was up for the Most Outstanding Teams Player for the third straight year. He was named Special Teams Player-of-the-Week in week 17.

The 2005 season was Holmes' best season, statistically. He started the season off on a good note, scoring on the opening kick-off. He finished the year with 899 rushing yards, 523 receiving yards, 1,157 kickoff return yards, and 835 punt return yards. Holmes set a Roughrider record and was third all-time in the CFL for combined yards with 3,455. He was named the CFL's Special Teams Player of the week four times, was named the CFL's Most Outstanding Special Teams Player, was the Western nominee for Most Outstanding Player, was a CFL all-star, was nominated for the Tom Pate Memorial Award as voted on by his teammates and he was the Riders Most Popular Player as voted on by the fans.

=== Hamilton Tiger-Cats ===
On April 12, 2006, Holmes was traded to the Hamilton Tiger-Cats, along with Scott Gordon, in exchange for the first overall pick in the 2006 CFL dispersal draft, which was used to select Kerry Joseph. After suffering a knee injury and coupled with the fact that his contract was expiring in 2007, the Tiger-Cats explored trade options for Holmes in early September. However, on September 18, 2006, he agreed to a three-year contract extension with the Tiger-Cats. He played in just ten games in 2006, where he recorded 64 carries for 369 yards and a touchdown, 33 catches for 263 yards, 25 punt returns for 125 yards, and 22 kickoff returns for 72 yards.

In 2007, Holmes played in eight games with the Tiger-Cats, recording 14 rush attempts for 74 yards, nine receptions for 53 yards, 22 kickoff returns for 424 yards, and 14 punt returns for 74 yards.

=== Saskatchewan Roughriders (II) ===
On August 19, 2007, Holmes was traded back to the Roughriders, along with Chris Getzlaf, for Jason Armstead. He played in nine regular season games for the Roughriders in 2007 where he had 14 carries for 73 rushing yards and two touchdowns, ten receptions for 135 yards and two touchdowns, 35 punt returns for 411 yards, and 33 kickoff returns for 584 yards. Holmes also played in his first Grey Cup game, where he had nine punt returns for 83 yards and two kickoff returns for 43 yards in the 95th Grey Cup championship victory over the Winnipeg Blue Bombers.

In the following off-season, Holmes was released by the Riders on January 29, 2008, a transaction that was not well received by Roughrider fans due to his immense popularity. Saskatchewan released Holmes largely because they were over the salary cap, and he became a casualty of that situation. He stated in the Regina Leader Post that he was earning $165,000 per year and that he was due a $30,000 bonus immediately. By releasing Holmes, Saskatchewan evaded paying the bonus. He further stated that "It's time for me to start planning for the future. We'll see if Saskatchewan hires a new coach who wants me. If not, I'll let the day go by and I'll keep talking to God. I can't let one rock get in my way. If I'm not playing anymore, it means I'll get into coaching. I really want to coach. I'll see what God wants me to do."

Holmes finished his career as the Roughriders' all-time leader in punt return yards (3,440), kickoff return yards (4,077), and kick return touchdowns (seven). He also finished fourth all-time in club history with 11,378 combined yards.

== Post-playing career ==
During the 2008 season, Holmes served as the receivers and defensive coach at Washington School in Greenville, Mississippi, helping the Washington Generals to win the 2008 Mississippi State AAA football championship. Holmes' contract was not renewed after the season.

On June 2, 2009, Holmes was elected mayor of Metcalfe, Mississippi. He defeated 16-year incumbent Shirley Allen 222 votes to 146. After eight years in office, he was unseated by Walter McDavid Jr. in 2017.
