= Elgaard =

Elgaard is a Danish surname. Notable people with the surname include:

- Casper Elgaard (born 1978), Danish auto racing driver
- Niels Elgaard (1879–1963), Danish farmer
- Ray Elgaard (born 1959), Canadian football player
