= Luca Congi =

Canadian football player (born 1983)

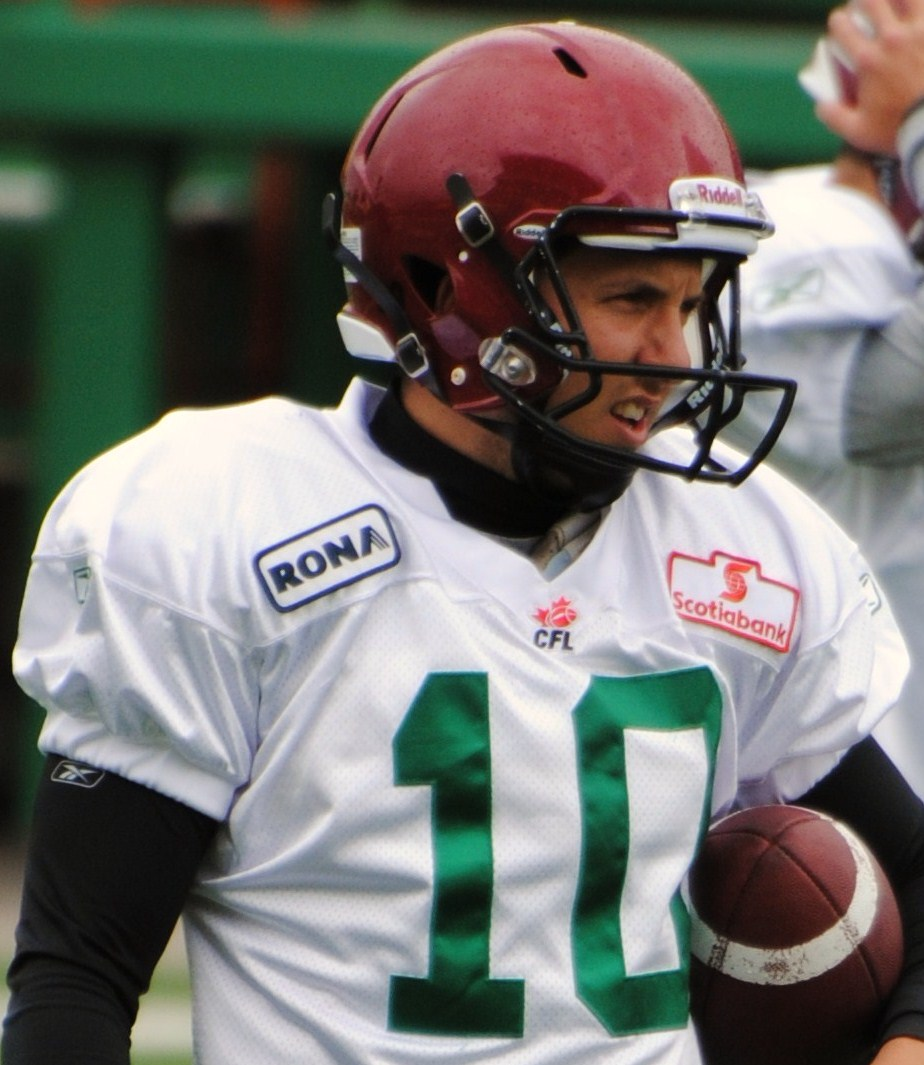
- Congi with the Saskatchewan Roughriders in 2010

No. 10
- Position: Kicker

Personal information
- Born: June 15, 1983 (age 43); Waterloo, Ontario, Canada
- Listed height: 5 ft 10 in (1.78 m)
- Listed weight: 190 lb (86 kg)

Career information
- University: Simon Fraser
- CFL draft: 2006: 2nd round, 12th overall pick

Career history
- 2006–2011: Saskatchewan Roughriders
- 2012–2013: Hamilton Tiger-Cats
- 2014: Edmonton Eskimos

Awards and highlights
- Grey Cup champion (2007); CFL East All-Star (2012)
- Stats at CFL.ca

Luca Congi (born June 15, 1983) is a Canadian former professional football punter/placekicker. He was drafted 12th overall by the Saskatchewan Roughriders in the 2006 CFL draft. He played CIS football at Simon Fraser University for the Simon Fraser Clan.

== Professional career ==
=== Saskatchewan Roughriders ===
Congi was drafted out of college by Saskatchewan (12th overall) in 2006, and he won the position of punter/placekicker in training camp. He replaced the Roughriders longtime franchise kicker Paul McCallum, who left Saskatchewan to join the BC Lions as a free agent in 2006. Congi won a Grey Cup with Saskatchewan in 2007. After the 2007 season, Congi was no longer the primary punter for Saskatchewan, with that role going to Jamie Boreham followed by Louie Sakoda in 2010. Instead, he handled all of Saskatchewan's placekicking duties. He was released following the 2011 season after Congi spent most of that season recuperating from injury while Christopher Milo filled in for him and ultimately replaced him.

His unorthodox kicking habit was noticed by many sportscasters. When he kicked the ball for a field goal, he did not look at where it is going, but instead looked at the ground only to look up when the ball is through the uprights.

=== Hamilton Tiger-Cats ===
He was signed by the Hamilton Tiger-Cats on March 23, 2012. He played two seasons for the Tiger-Cats before quitting the team February 2014 in the wake of the team's re-signing of Justin Medlock, who had also been the Tiger-Cats' kicker before Congi's arrival.

=== Edmonton Eskimos ===
On September 8, 2014, Congi signed with the Edmonton Eskimos.

Congi signed a one-day contract on June 27, 2016, to retire as a member of the Saskatchewan Roughriders.

Preceded by Paul McCallum	Saskatchewan Roughriders kicker 2006–2010	Succeeded by Christopher Milo
Preceded by Justin Medlock	Hamilton Tiger-Cats kicker 2012–2013	Succeeded by Justin Medlock
