= Vince Goldsmith =

American gridiron football player (born 1959)

No. 70
- Positions: Defensive end, linebacker

Personal information
- Born: July 20, 1959 (age 67); Fort Riley, Kansas, U.S.

Career information
- College: Oregon

Career history
- 1981–1983: Saskatchewan Roughriders
- 1984: Toronto Argonauts
- 1985–1987: Calgary Stampeders
- 1988–1990: Saskatchewan Roughriders

Awards and highlights
- Grey Cup champion (1989); CFL's Most Outstanding Rookie Award (1981); Jackie Parker Trophy (1981); CFL All-Star (1983); 3× CFL West All-Star (1981, 1983, 1988); Second-team All-American (1980); First-team All-Pac-10 (1979, 1980); Second-team All-Pac-10 (1978)

Career CFL statistics
- Games played: 163
- Sacks: 103.5
- Canadian Football Hall of Fame (Class of 2024)

Vince Goldsmith (born July 20, 1959) is an American former professional football linebacker and defensive end who played for ten years in the Canadian Football League (CFL). He spent the majority of his career with the Saskatchewan Roughriders with whom he won a Grey Cup championship in 1989. Goldsmith was named a CFL All-Star in 1983 and was named a CFL West All-Star three times. He also won the CFL's Most Outstanding Rookie Award in 1981. He had also been a member of the Toronto Argonauts and the Calgary Stampeders. He played college football for the Oregon Ducks.

In High School, at Mount Tahoma HS, Goldsmith set the all-time Washington State shot put record of 69'11" on April 29, 1977.

== College career ==
Goldsmith played college football with the University of Oregon Ducks (from 1977 to 1980) as a defensive tackle. At 230 lbs but only 5 feet 11 inches Goldsmith earned First Team All-Conference honors twice while becoming the school’s only defensive lineman ever to receive the Morris Trophy as top lineman. A 1980 Second Team Associated Press All-American, he recorded 13 tackles in his collegiate debut. His most productive year was as a sophomore, when he tallied 87 tackles (62 unassisted) and 14 tackles for losses. He finished his collegiate career with 281 tackles, including 34 sacks, or tackles behind the line of scrimmage. He was inducted into the University of Oregon Hall of Fame in 2002.

== Professional career ==
Thought too small for the National Football League, Goldsmith came to Canada and played for 10 years. He made an instant impression in 1981 with the Saskatchewan Roughriders, recording 17 sacks, being named an All-Star and winning the CFL's Most Outstanding Rookie Award. He was also a CFL All-Star in 1983. He played with the Roughriders from 1981 to 1983 and again from 1988 to 1990; in his second stint with the Roughriders, he appeared in the team's Grey Cup win in 1989. He played 101 games with the team and came in second in team history for sacks with 89. He played 17 games for the Toronto Argonauts in 1984 and played three years (1985 to 1987) with the Calgary Stampeders. His career total of 130.5 sacks is the eighth-best in CFL history.

Goldsmith was announced as a member of the Canadian Football Hall of Fame 2024 class on May 3, 2024.
