= Dave Dryburgh Memorial Trophy =

Canadian Football League award, created 1948

The Dave Dryburgh Memorial Trophy is a Canadian Football League trophy, given to the top scorer in the West Division. Unlike other CFL trophies, there is no East Division counterpart.

The trophy was established in November 1948, by sportswriters in Western Canada to honour Dave Dryburgh, the sports editor of the Regina Leader-Post who died in a boating accident in 1948. It was originally awarded to the top scorer in the Western Interprovincial Football Union.

== Dave Dryburgh Memorial Trophy winners ==
Year	Player	Position	Club	Points scored
1948	Paul Rowe	RB	Calgary Stampeders	35
1949	Vern Graham	HB / K	Calgary Stampeders	58
1950	Joe Aguirre	OE	Winnipeg Blue Bombers	57
1951	Bob Shaw	OE	Calgary Stampeders	61
1952	Bob Shaw	OE	Calgary Stampeders	110
1953	Bud Korchak	FW / K	Winnipeg Blue Bombers	66
1954	Joe Aguirre	OE	Saskatchewan Roughriders	85
1955	Ken Carpenter	HB / OE	Saskatchewan Roughriders	90
1956	Buddy Leake	RB / K / QB	Winnipeg Blue Bombers	103
1957	Gerry James	RB	Winnipeg Blue Bombers	131
1958	Jack Hill	RB / K	Saskatchewan Roughriders	145
1959	Jackie Parker	RB / K / P / QB	Edmonton Eskimos	109
1960	Gerry James	RB	Winnipeg Blue Bombers	114
1961	Jackie Parker	RB / K / P / QB	Edmonton Eskimos	104
1962	Tommy Joe Coffey	OE	Edmonton Eskimos	129
1963	George Fleming	HB / K	Winnipeg Blue Bombers	135
1964	Larry Robinson	DB / K	Calgary Stampeders	106
1965	Larry Robinson	DB / K	Calgary Stampeders	95
1966	Hugh Campbell	F	Saskatchewan Roughriders	102
1967	Terry Evanshen	WR	Calgary Stampeders	102
1968	Ted Gerela	K	BC Lions	115
1969	Jack Abendschan	OG / K	Saskatchewan Roughriders	116
1970	Jack Abendschan	OG / K	Saskatchewan Roughriders	116
1971	Don Jonas	QB	Winnipeg Blue Bombers	121
1972	Dave Cutler	K	Edmonton Eskimos	126
1973	Dave Cutler	K	Edmonton Eskimos	133
1974	Dave Cutler	K	Edmonton Eskimos	144
1975	Dave Cutler	K	Edmonton Eskimos	169
1976	Bernie Ruoff	K / P	Winnipeg Blue Bombers	152
1977	Dave Cutler	K	Edmonton Eskimos	195
1978	Dave Cutler	K	Edmonton Eskimos	167
1979	Bernie Ruoff	K / P	Winnipeg Blue Bombers	151
1980	Dave Cutler	K	Edmonton Eskimos	158
1981	Trevor Kennerd	K	Winnipeg Blue Bombers	185
1982	Dave Cutler	K	Edmonton Eskimos	170
1983	Lui Passaglia	K / P	BC Lions	191
1984	Lui Passaglia	K / P	BC Lions	167
1985	Trevor Kennerd	K	Winnipeg Blue Bombers	198
1986	Tom Dixon	K / P	Edmonton Eskimos	190
1987	Lui Passaglia	K / P	BC Lions	214
1988	Dave Ridgway	K	Saskatchewan Roughriders	215
1989	Jerry Kauric	K / P	Edmonton Eskimos	224
1990	Dave Ridgway	K	Saskatchewan Roughriders	233
1991	Dave Ridgway	K	Saskatchewan Roughriders	216
1992	Mark McLoughlin	K	Calgary Stampeders	208
1993	Mark McLoughlin	K	Calgary Stampeders	215
1994	Sean Fleming	K / P	Edmonton Eskimos	206
1995	Mark McLoughlin	K	Calgary Stampeders	220
1996	Mark McLoughlin	K	Calgary Stampeders	220
1997	Sean Fleming	K / P	Edmonton Eskimos	187
1998	Lui Passaglia	K / P	BC Lions	197
1999	Mark McLoughlin	K	Calgary Stampeders	192
2000	Mark McLoughlin	K	Calgary Stampeders	199
2001	Sean Fleming	K / P	Edmonton Eskimos	183
2002	Troy Westwood	K	Winnipeg Blue Bombers	204
2003	Troy Westwood	K	Winnipeg Blue Bombers	198
2004	Sean Fleming	K / P	Edmonton Eskimos	180
2005	Sandro DeAngelis	K	Calgary Stampeders	179
2006	Sandro DeAngelis	K	Calgary Stampeders	214
2007	Paul McCallum	K / P	BC Lions	166
2008	Sandro DeAngelis	K	Calgary Stampeders	217
2009	Sandro DeAngelis	K	Calgary Stampeders	176
2010	Rob Maver	K	Calgary Stampeders	185
2011	Paul McCallum	K / P	BC Lions	203
2012	Paul McCallum	K / P	BC Lions	187
2013	Rene Paredes	K	Calgary Stampeders	213
2014	Rene Paredes	K	Calgary Stampeders	155
2015	Rene Paredes	K	Calgary Stampeders	156
2016	Justin Medlock	K / P	Winnipeg Blue Bombers	220
2017	Justin Medlock	K / P	Winnipeg Blue Bombers	216
2018	Brett Lauther	K	Saskatchewan Roughriders	198
2019	Sean Whyte	K	Edmonton Eskimos	174
2020	season cancelled - covid 19			
2021	Rene Paredes	K	Calgary Stampeders	155
2022	Rene Paredes	K	Calgary Stampeders	211
2023	Sergio Castillo	K	Winnipeg Blue Bombers	196
2024	Brett Lauther	K	Saskatchewan Roughriders	201
2025	Sergio Castillo	K	Winnipeg Blue Bombers	185
