= Ray Purdin =

Canadian football player

Profile
- Position: Running back

Personal information
- Born: c. 1937; Hillsboro, Ohio, U.S.

Career information
- College: Northwestern
- AFL draft: 1961: 7th round, 51st overall pick

Career history
- 1961–1963: Saskatchewan Roughriders

Awards and highlights
- Second-team All-Big Ten (1959)

Raymond Purdin, known as Ray Purdin or Dutch Purdin, was a running back for the Saskatchewan Roughriders of the Canadian Football League (CFL) from 1961 to 1963.

Ray Purdin was born in Hillsboro, Ohio and played college football at Northwestern University. In 1960, his final college season, Purdin scored three touchdowns and was voted as the most valuable player in the Blue–Gray Football Classic.

In 1961, Purdin was the seventh-round draft pick of the Oakland Raiders of the American Football League (AFL) but joined the Saskatchewan Roughriders of the Canadian Football League and played three seasons with them. His best year was the 1962 CFL season, during which he ran for 809 yards (6.1 yards per rush), caught 34 passes for 771 yards, and returned kickoffs for 437 yards, which earned him Western Conference and CFL All-Star Honors. He holds the second longest run from scrimmage in Roughrider history, 93 yards, while playing against the Montreal Alouettes on September 12, 1962. In 1963, his performance dropped to 3.4 yards per rush. Though he caught 26 passes, he reached only 340 yards in receptions. In 1964, he was replaced by Ed Buchanan and never played another down in the CFL.
