= Vern Graham =

Canadian football player

Profile
- Positions: Halfback, Kicker

Personal information
- Born: August 6, 1924
- Died: March 22, 2010 (aged 85); Calgary, Alberta, Canada

Career information
- College: Crescent Heights High School

Career history
- 1947, 1949–51: Calgary Stampeders

Awards and highlights
- Dave Dryburgh Memorial Trophy (1949); CFL West All-Star (1949)

Vernon Austin Graham (August 6, 1924 – March 22, 2010) was a Canadian professional football player with the Calgary Stampeders.

A native of Calgary, Graham joined his hometown Stamps in 1947. He made the unfortunate mistake of sitting out the 1948 season, missing a Grey Cup championship. He returned in 1949 and made a trip to the Grey Cup final (a defeat to the Montreal Alouettes,) and was also an all-star and won the Dave Dryburgh Memorial Trophy as scoring leader (with 58 points on 2 touchdowns, 27 converts and 7 field goals.) He finished football in 1951. He died on March 22, 2010, aged 85.
