= John Agro Special Teams Award =

Award in the Canadian Football League

The John Agro Special Teams Award is presented to the CFL's Most Outstanding Special Teams player that is voted by his peers. The award is named in honour of John Agro, co-founder (in 1965) of the Canadian Football League Players' Association, with whom he also served as legal counsel.

== John Agro Special Teams Award winners ==
- 2025 – Trey Vaval (KR/DB), Winnipeg Blue Bombers
- 2024 – Janarion Grant (KR/WR), Toronto Argonauts
- 2023 – Javon Leake (KR/RB), Toronto Argonauts
- 2022 – Mario Alford (KR/PR), Saskatchewan Roughriders
- 2021 – DeVonte Dedmon (KR/PR), Ottawa Redblacks
- 2020 – season cancelled – COVID-19
- 2019 – Frankie Williams (KR/PR), Hamilton Tiger-Cats
- 2018 – Lewis Ward (K), Ottawa Redblacks
- 2017 – Roy Finch (KR), Calgary Stampeders
- 2016 – Justin Medlock (K), Winnipeg Blue Bombers
- 2015 – Brandon Banks (WR) Hamilton Tiger-Cats
- 2014 – Swayze Waters (K), Toronto Argonauts
- 2013 – Rene Paredes (K), Calgary Stampeders
- 2012 – Chris Williams (WR), Hamilton Tiger-Cats
- 2011 – Paul McCallum (K), BC Lions
- 2010 – Chad Owens (WR), Toronto Argonauts
- 2009 – Larry Taylor (WR), Montreal Alouettes
- 2008 – Dominique Dorsey (RB), Toronto Argonauts
- 2007 – Ian Smart (RB), BC Lions
- 2006 – Sandro DeAngelis (K), Calgary Stampeders
- 2005 – Corey Holmes (RB), Saskatchewan Roughriders
- 2004 – Keith Stokes (WR), Winnipeg Blue Bombers
- 2003 – Bashir Levingston (WR), Toronto Argonauts
- 2002 – Corey Holmes (RB), Saskatchewan Roughriders
- 2001 – Charles Roberts (RB), Winnipeg Blue Bombers
- 2000 – Albert Johnson III (WR), Winnipeg Blue Bombers
- 1999 – Jimmy Cunningham (RB), BC Lions

== John Agro Special Teams Award runners-up ==
- 2025 – Lirim Hajrullahu (K), Toronto Argonauts
- 2024 – Sean Whyte (K), BC Lions
- 2023 – Sean Whyte (K), BC Lions
- 2022 – Chandler Worthy (KR), Montreal Alouettes
- 2021 – Rene Paredes (K), Calgary Stampeders
- 2020 – season cancelled – covid 19
- 2019 – Mike Miller (FB/ST), Winnipeg Blue Bombers
- 2018 – Ty Long (P/K), BC Lions
- 2017 – Diontae Spencer (KR), Ottawa RedBlacks
- 2016 – Brandon Banks (WR) Hamilton Tiger-Cats
- 2015 – Rene Paredes (K), Calgary Stampeders
- 2014 – Lirim Hajrullahu (K), Winnipeg Blue Bombers
- 2013 – Marc Beswick (CB), Hamilton Tiger-Cats
- 2012 – Tim Brown (RB), BC Lions
- 2011 – Chad Owens (WR), Toronto Argonauts
- 2010 – Yonus Davis (RB), BC Lions
- 2009 – Jason Arakgi (LB), BC Lions
- 2008 – Sandro DeAngelis (K), Calgary Stampeders
- 2007 – Dominique Dorsey (RB), Toronto Argonauts
- 2006 – Noel Prefontaine (P), Toronto Argonauts
- 2005 – Noel Prefontaine (P), Toronto Argonauts
- 2004 – Jason Armstead (WR), Ottawa Renegades
- 2003 – Wane McGarity (WR), Calgary Stampeders
- 2002 – Keith Stokes (WR), Montreal Alouettes
