= Ferd Burket =

American gridiron football player (1933–2018)

Profile
- Positions: Halfback, Fullback, Punter

Personal information
- Born: January 9, 1933; San Antonio, Texas, U.S.
- Died: March 27, 2018 (aged 85); Jourdanton, Texas, U.S.
- Listed height: 6 ft 0 in (1.83 m)
- Listed weight: 205 lb (93 kg)

Career information
- College: Texas, Southeastern Oklahoma State

Career history
- 1959–1962: Saskatchewan Roughriders
- 1963: Montreal Alouettes

Ferdinand John Burket IV (January 9, 1933 – March 27, 2018) was an American professional football player who played for the Montreal Alouettes and Saskatchewan Roughriders in the 1950s. Prior to that, he played college football at the University of Texas and Southeastern Oklahoma State University.

== Background ==
Ferdie Burket was born in San Antonio, Texas on January 9, 1933. He went to St. Gerard Catholic High School where he excelled at football, baseball and basketball. He went to Texas on a football scholarship and played on the freshman team in 1951. He was a quarterback on the All-State Catholic squad in 1951.

He was injured and returned home to rehab. He later joined the U.S. Army, playing football for them in Germany. After his military service, he received a football scholarship to Southeastern Oklahoma State University, where he played from 1956-1958. He had a great career there and led the NAIA in punting his senior year with a 46 yard average.

Burket died in Jourdanton, Texas on March 27, 2018, at the age of 85.

== Career ==
Burket was drafted by the Baltimore Colts in the 14th round in 1959 NFL draft and went to camp with them, just barely missing the cut. He then went to Canada and played running back and punter for the Roughriders from 1959 to 1962 and then for the Alouettes in 1963. During his four years with the Saskatchewan, he established several team records, including most touchdowns in one game (5), most points in a game (30) and most rushing TDs in one game (4).

After a career-ending injury in the CFL, he returned to Texas and worked as a coach, Athletic Director, and teacher at Pleasanton High School and simultaneously as a rancher and cattleman.

He was named St.Gerard's "Athlete of the Half-Century" and inducted into the St. Gerard High School Hall of Fame, the Southeastern Athletics Hall of Fame, and the Pleasanton High School Hall of Fame.
