= Albert Brown (Canadian football) =

American gridiron football player (born 1963)

Profile
- Position: Defensive back

Personal information
- Born: December 19, 1963 (age 62); Omaha, Nebraska, U.S.

Career information
- College: Western Illinois

Career history
- 1987–1995: Saskatchewan Roughriders
- 1995: Winnipeg Blue Bombers

Awards and highlights
- Grey Cup champion (1989)

Career statistics
- Tackles: 277
- Interceptions: 32
- Touchdowns: 2

Albert Brown (born December 19, 1963) is an American former professional football defensive back in the Canadian Football League (CFL). He played for the Saskatchewan Roughriders and Winnipeg Blue Bombers. Brown played college football at Western Illinois.
