= Gene Wlasiuk =

Canadian football player (1936–2011)

Profile
- Position: Defensive back

Personal information
- Born: February 24, 1936; Winnipeg, Manitoba, Canada
- Died: December 27, 2011 (aged 75); Regina, Saskatchewan, Canada
- Listed height: 5 ft 9 in (1.75 m)
- Listed weight: 165 lb (75 kg)

Career history
- 1957–1959: Winnipeg Blue Bombers
- 1959–1967: Saskatchewan Roughriders

Awards and highlights
- Grey Cup champion (1966)

Eugene Wlasiuk (February 24, 1936 – December 27, 2011) was a Canadian professional football player who played for the Saskatchewan Roughriders. He won the Grey Cup with Saskatchewan in 1966.
