= Reg Whitehouse =

Canadian football player (1932–2008)

Profile
- Position: Offensive lineman

Personal information
- Born: October 8, 1932; Montreal, Quebec, Canada
- Died: August 6, 2008 (aged 75); Chilliwack, British Columbia, Canada

Career history
- 1952–1966: Saskatchewan Roughriders

Awards and highlights
- Grey Cup champion (1966)

Reg Whitehouse (October 8, 1932 – August 6, 2008) was a Canadian Football League offensive lineman and placekicker who played for the Saskatchewan Roughriders from 1952 through 1966.

After playing junior football for the Notre-Dame-de-Grace Maple Leafs, Reg Whitehouse joined the Saskatchewan Roughriders in 1952 as an offensive lineman and placekicker, staying with them until 1966, the year they won the 54th Grey Cup. Whitehouse's best year as a kicker was 1959 when he converted 13 of 17 field goals for a 76.5 average. His career field goal percentage was 51.8 from 1952 to 1964. In 1965, the kicking duties were taken over by fellow offensive lineman Jack Abendschan. In 1992, Whitehouse was inducted into the team's Plaza of Honor.
