= Mario Alford =

American gridiron football player (born 1992)

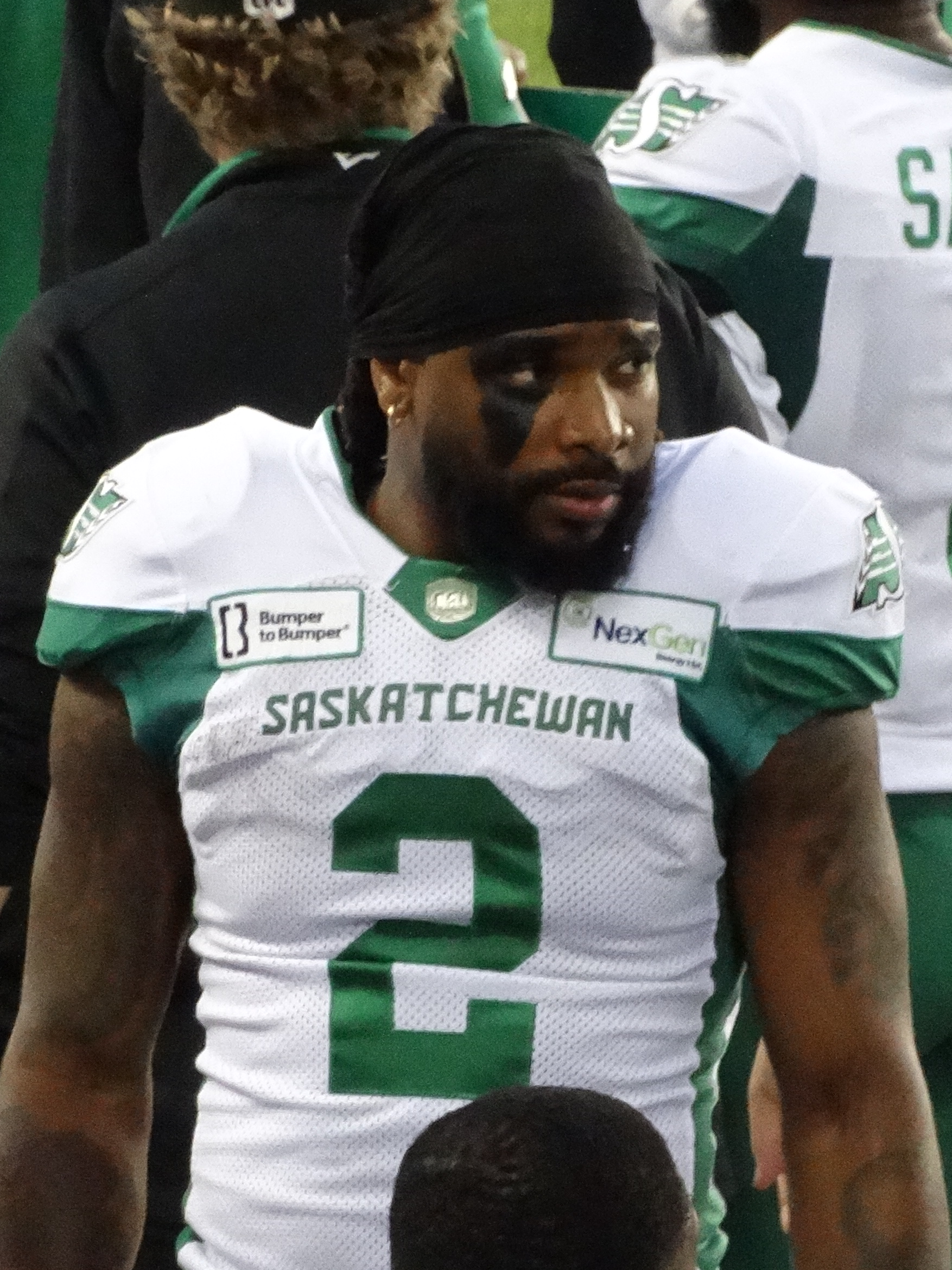
- Alford with the Saskatchewan Roughriders in 2024

Profile
- Positions: Wide receiver, return specialist

Personal information
- Born: February 25, 1992 (age 34); Greenville, Georgia, U.S.
- Listed height: 5 ft 8 in (1.73 m)
- Listed weight: 180 lb (82 kg)

Career information
- High school: Greenville
- College: Georgia Military (2011–2012); West Virginia (2013–2014)
- NFL draft: 2015: 7th round, 238th overall pick

Career history
- Cincinnati Bengals (2015); New York Jets (2016)*; Cleveland Browns (2016); Chicago Bears (2017)*; Toronto Argonauts (2018); Montreal Alouettes (2019–2022); Saskatchewan Roughriders (2022–2025); Hamilton Tiger-Cats (2026)*; Montreal Alouettes (2026)
- * Offseason or practice squad member only

Awards and highlights
- Grey Cup champion (2025); John Agro Special Teams Award (2022); CFL West All-Star (2023); First-team All-American (2014)

Career NFL statistics
- Receptions: 1
- Receiving yards: 15
- Stats at Pro Football Reference

Career CFL statistics as of 2025
- Receptions: 9
- Receiving yards: 77
- Return yards: 8,049
- Return touchdowns: 11
- Stats at CFL.ca

Mario Alford (born February 25, 1992) is an American professional football wide receiver and return specialist. He most recently played for the Montreal Alouettes of the Canadian Football League (CFL). He played college football for the West Virginia Mountaineers, earning first-team All-American honors in 2014.

== Professional career ==
Pre-draft measurables
Height	Weight	Arm length	Hand span	Wingspan	40-yard dash	10-yard split	20-yard split	20-yard shuttle	Three-cone drill	Vertical jump	Broad jump	Bench press
5 ft 8 1/2 in (1.74 m)	180 lb (82 kg)	31 1/4 in (0.79 m)	9 3/8 in (0.24 m)	6 ft 2 3/8 in (1.89 m)	4.27 s	1.50 s	2.46 s	4.07 s	6.64 s	34.0 in (0.86 m)	10 ft 1 in (3.07 m)	13 reps
All values from NFL Combine/Pro Day

=== Cincinnati Bengals ===
Alford was selected by the Cincinnati Bengals in the seventh round, 238th overall, in the 2015 NFL draft. He played in one game his rookie year with the Bengals registering one catch for 15 yards. On September 3, 2016, he was released by the Bengals.

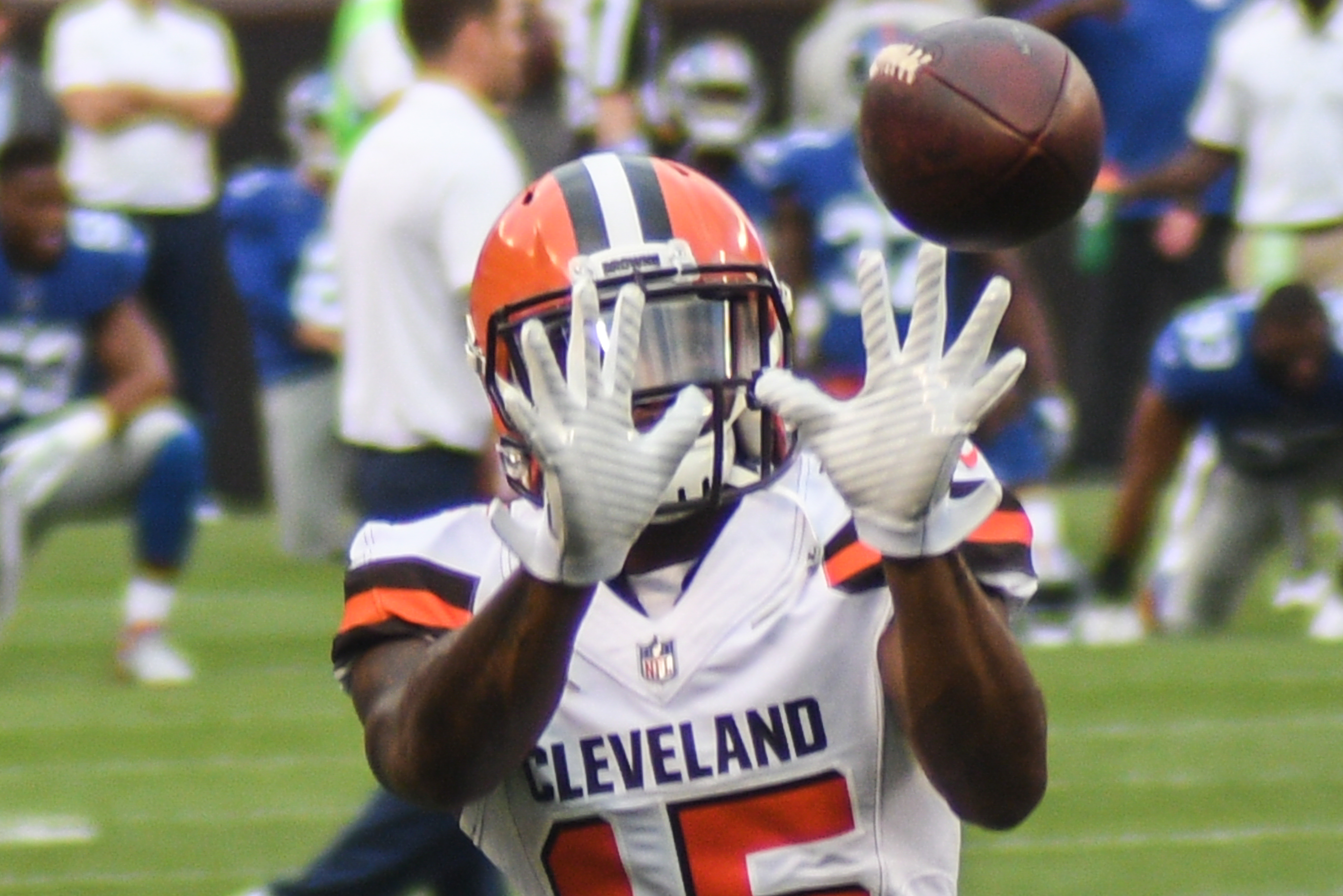
Alford with the Cleveland Browns during the 2017 preseason

=== New York Jets ===
On November 16, 2016, Alford was signed to the practice squad of the New York Jets. He was released by the team on December 6, 2016.

=== Cleveland Browns ===
Alford was signed to the Cleveland Browns' practice squad on December 13, 2016. He was promoted to the active roster on December 17, 2016.

On September 1, 2017, Alford was waived by the Browns during roster cutdowns.

=== Chicago Bears ===
On September 12, 2017, Alford was signed to the Chicago Bears' practice squad.

=== Toronto Argonauts ===
On June 3, 2018, Alford signed with the Toronto Argonauts of the Canadian Football League (CFL). In his lone season in Toronto, Alford appeared in six games and caught seven passes for 57 yards, returned eight kick-offs for 170 yards, had five punt returns for seven yards, and rushed the ball once for 10 yards. He was released on May 25, 2019.

=== Montreal Alouettes (first stint) ===
On September 24, 2019, it was announced that Alford had signed with the Montreal Alouettes. He was signed for the 2021 season on December 15, 2020. Over parts of three seasons, Alford played in nine games with the Alouettes where he had 24 kickoff returns for 477 yards, 26 punt returns for 486 yards and three touchdowns, and two missed field goal returns for 45 yards.

=== Saskatchewan Roughriders ===
On July 3, 2022, Alford was traded to the Saskatchewan Roughriders in exchange for a sixth-round pick in the 2023 CFL draft. He played in 13 regular season games for the team where he had 38 kickoff returns for 990 yards and two touchdowns, 44 punt returns for 530 yards and one touchdown, and three missed field goal returns for 129 yards and one touchdown. For his strong season, he was named the CFL's Most Outstanding Special Teams Player in 2022.

On November 15, 2022, the Roughriders announced that Alford had signed a contract extension with the team. In 2023, he had 2,266 combined yards (978 punt return, 1,181 kickoff return, 107 missed field goal return). Alford added three touchdowns on punt returns, including two on July 15 against the Calgary Stampeders.

On January 4, 2024, the Roughriders announced that Alford had signed a one-year contract extension with the team.

He became a free agent upon the expiry of his contract on February 10, 2026.

=== Hamilton Tiger-Cats ===
On February 10, 2026, it was announced that Alford had signed with the Hamilton Tiger-Cats. On May 25, he was released.

=== Montreal Alouettes (second stint) ===
The Montreal Alouettes announced on June 18, 2026, that Alford had re-signed with the team following the release of the incumbent returner, Phillip Brooks, two days earlier. He played in four games where he had 20 punt returns for 226 yards and 14 kickoff returns for 293 yards. With Devonte Dedmon healthy, Alford was released on July 21, 2026.
