= Dwight Edwards =

Jamaican canadian football player

No. 30 or 33
- Positions: Wide receiver, Kick returner

Personal information
- Born: June 16, 1954 (age 72); Manchester, Jamaica

Career history
- 1978–1979, 1986–1988: Toronto Argonauts
- 1980–1983: Saskatchewan Roughriders
- 1984–1985: Ottawa Rough Riders
- 1985: Calgary Stampeders
- 1985: Montreal Concordes

Dwight Edwards (born June 16, 1954) was a Canadian Football League wide receiver and kick returner who played eleven seasons for five different teams. His family emigrated from Jamaica to Canada and settled in Mississauga, Ontario.
