= Ed Buchanan =

Canadian football running back

Profile
- Position: Running back

Personal information
- Born: July 16, 1934; San Diego, California, U.S.
- Died: August 31, 1991 (aged 57); San Diego, California, U.S.
- Listed height: 6 ft 1 in (1.85 m)
- Listed weight: 186 lb (84 kg)

Career information
- High school: Kearny
- College: San Diego City College

Career history
- 1961–1963: Calgary Stampeders
- 1963–1967: Saskatchewan Roughriders
- 1969–1970: Hamilton Tiger-Cats

Awards and highlights
- Grey Cup champion (1966); CFL All-Star (1964); CFL West All-Star (1964)

Ed Buchanan (July 16, 1934 – August 31, 1991) was an American professional football running back who played nine seasons in the Canadian Football League (CFL) for three teams. He was a CFL All-Star in 1964 while setting a record with 2,071 yards from scrimmage. Though injured for most of that year, he was part of the Saskatchewan Roughriders 1966 Grey Cup winning team.

== Early life and college ==
Buchanan graduated from Kearny High School in San Diego, California and attended San Diego City College.

== Professional career ==
Buchanan began his CFL career with the Calgary Stampeders in 1961. He played sparingly for them in the first year but blossomed in 1962 with 824 yards rushing and a 6.0 rushing average. Nevertheless, he was traded the following year to the Saskatchewan Roughriders. In 1964, Buchanan became an elite running back, rushing for 1,390 yards (7.8 yards per carry) and receiving for 681 yards (18.9 yards per catch, astounding for a running back), plus 352 yards in kick returns (27.0 yards per return). He specialized in outside runs, in contrast to his running partner, George Reed, who specialized in inside runs and ran for 1,012 yards, both running backs rushing for over 1,000 yards. However, injuries curtailed Buchanan's 1965 and 1966 seasons to only 4 and 6 games, respectively. He came back strong in 1967 with 695 yards rushing (5.8 yards per carry). He did not play in 1968 and was traded in 1969 to the Hamilton Tiger Cats, where he played for two more years before retiring.

== Honors ==
Buchanan was inducted in the Plaza of Honor in Saskatchewan in 2012.

== Death ==
Buchanan died of Lou Gehrig's disease (ALS) causing paralysis in San Diego on August 31, 1991, at the age of 51.

== Video clips ==
7 min biography as a Plaza of Honor inductee, 2012

4 min biography as an inductee of the Stephen W Kearny High School Hall of Fame, 2013
