= Tim McCray =

American gridiron football player (born 1960)

No. 14
- Position: Running back

Personal information
- Born: August 20, 1960 (age 66); Waycross, Georgia, U.S.

Career information
- College: Tulane

Career history
- 1984–1985: Ottawa Rough Riders
- 1986–1990: Saskatchewan Roughriders

Awards and highlights
- Grey Cup champion (1989); CFL All-Star (1989); CFL West All-Star (1989)

Tim McCray (born August 20, 1960) was a Canadian Football League (CFL) running back for the Ottawa Rough Riders from 1984 through 1985, and for the Saskatchewan Roughriders in 1986 through 1990. He was an All-Star in 1989, the same year the Roughriders won the 77th Grey Cup.

In 1989, Tim won his first Grey Cup and was selected to the All-West and All-CFL All-Star team for the first time. He established career highs in all offensive categories as well as leading the CFL and breaking the Roughriders record for all-purpose yardage in the season with 2,684 yards. Tim became the sixth Roughrider to break the 1,000-rushing-yard mark with 1,285 yards rushing. Tim placed second in the club with 75 receptions for 749 yards. Tim also led the Roughriders in kick-off returns with 650 yards on 29 returns for a 22.4 average. Tim was the 1989 Saskatchewan Roughriders Molson Cup winner as selected by the fans as the most Popular Player.
