= Dave Ridgway =

Player of American and Canadian football

No. 36
- Position: Kicker

Personal information
- Born: April 24, 1959 (age 67); Stockport, England
- Listed height: 6 ft 1 in (1.85 m)
- Listed weight: 190 lb (86 kg)

Career information
- High school: M. M. Robinson (Burlington, Ontario, Canada)
- College: Toledo
- CFL draft: 1981: 7th round, 58th overall pick

Career history
- 1982–1995: Saskatchewan Roughriders

Awards and highlights
- Grey Cup champion (1989); 3× Dave Dryburgh Memorial Trophy (1988, 1990, 1991); Dick Suderman Trophy (1989); 6× CFL All-Star (1982, 1987–1990, 1993); 7× CFL West All-Star (1982, 1987–1991, 1993); Saskatchewan Roughriders No. 36 retired
- Canadian Football Hall of Fame (Class of 2003)

David Ridgway (born April 24, 1959) is a former placekicker for the Saskatchewan Roughriders of the Canadian Football League (CFL). His CFL career began in 1981 when he was drafted by the Montreal Alouettes. He did not make the squad that year and returned to the University of Toledo to complete his degree in Marketing. Prior to the 1982 CFL season he signed as a free-agent with the Roughriders and began an impressive 14-year career with the club.

Ridgway is the eldest son of Leonard and Mary Ridgway, and has two younger brothers (John and Neil) and one sister (Lyn). Ridgway emigrated to Canada in 1974 and began his football career while attending M.M. Robinson High School in Burlington, Ontario. In 1977, he began his collegiate football career playing in the Mid American Conference with the University of Toledo Rockets.

Ridgway is considered one of the best placekickers to ever play the Canadian game and was known for his dependability in clutch situations. He is one of the most accurate kickers in CFL history for those who have attempted more than 150 career field goals. During his 14-year tenure he attempted 736 field goals and made 574 (78%).

Ridgway played in 238 games, all with the Roughriders, although in early 1987 he was traded to the Edmonton Eskimos who subsequently dealt him back to the Alouettes. When the Alouettes folded prior to the start of the regular season, Saskatchewan was able to reclaim Ridgway's rights in the second round of the dispersal draft. Later that season, Ridgway made a then CFL record 60-yard field goal (since surpassed by Paul McCallum in 2001 when he hit from 62 yards; it was the first time in CFL history a field goal was made from that distance).

Ridgway's most famous kick as a Roughrider was a 35-yard field goal in the dying moments to lift the Roughriders to a 43-40 victory over the Hamilton Tiger-Cats in the 1989 Grey Cup in what was considered one of the most thrilling Grey Cup games in history. The game was played in the newly opened Toronto SkyDome and brought the province of Saskatchewan their second Grey Cup victory in the team history.

Ridgway still holds or shares a number of CFL records such as 59 field goals made in a season in 1990, and 8 field goals made in a game (which he did twice, in 1984 & 1988). Ridgway held the record for most consecutive field goals made, with 28 in 1993. This record—particularly impressive because the majority of his kicks were attempted in the windy confines of Taylor Field—was also bested by McCallum who connected on 30 straight field goals in 2011. Both Ridgway's and McCallum's streaks ended with misses in BC Place Stadium. The current professional football record for consecutive field goals is held by Lewis Ward, whose 69 consecutive goal streak ended in 2019.

His nickname was "Robokicker". and it also the title of his best selling autobiography, Robokicker: An Odyssey through the CFL, which was co-written with David A. Poulsen and published in 1995.

== Awards and honours ==
CFL All-Star, 1982, 1987, 1988, 1989, 1990 and 1993
Dave Dryburgh Memorial Trophy Winner, 1989, 1990, 1991
Dick Suderman Trophy (Most Outstanding Canadian in a Grey Cup), 1989

His jersey number 36 is one of only eight jerseys retired by the Roughrider organization. Ridgway was inducted into the Roughriders Plaza of Honour in 2000 and the Canadian Football Hall of Fame in 2003.
