= Chris Getzlaf =

Canadian football player (born 1983)

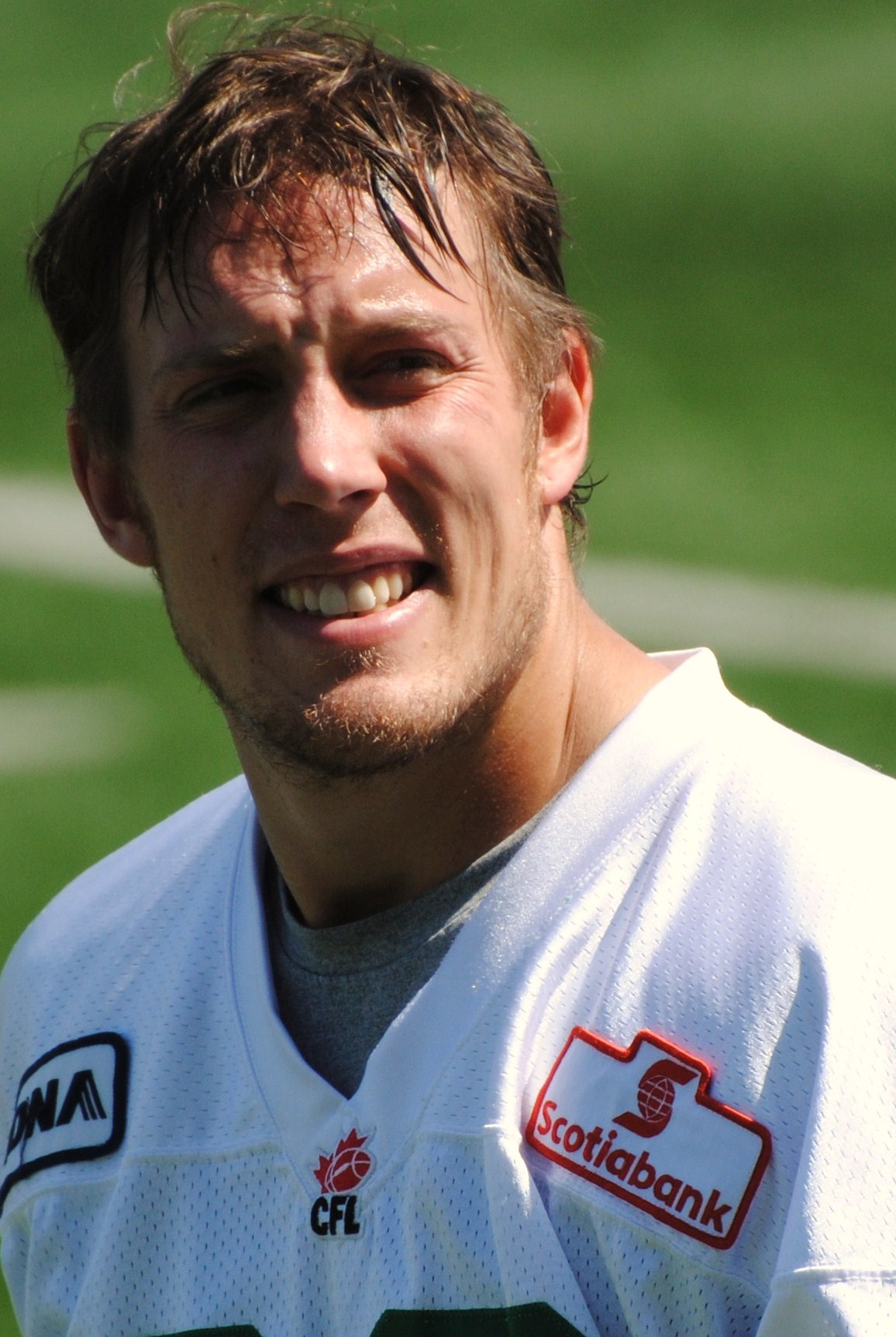
- Getzlaf with the Saskatchewan Roughriders in 2010

No. 89
- Position: Slotback

Personal information
- Born: January 9, 1983 (age 43); Regina, Saskatchewan, Canada
- Listed height: 6 ft 1 in (1.85 m)
- Listed weight: 210 lb (95 kg)

Career information
- CJFL: Prairie Thunder
- University: Regina
- CFL draft: 2007: 5th round, 33rd overall pick

Career history
- 2007: Hamilton Tiger-Cats*
- 2007–2015: Saskatchewan Roughriders
- 2016–2017: Edmonton Eskimos
- 2017: Saskatchewan Roughriders
- * Offseason or practice squad member only

Awards and highlights
- 2× Grey Cup champion (2007, 2013); 2× CFL West All-Star (2012, 2013); Dick Suderman Trophy (2013); First-team All-Canadian (2006)
- Stats at CFL.ca

Chris Getzlaf (born January 9, 1983) is a Canadian former professional football slotback who played in the Canadian Football League (CFL) from 2007 to 2017. He was drafted in the fifth round of the 2007 CFL draft, 33rd overall, by the Hamilton Tiger-Cats, and was later traded that season to the Saskatchewan Roughriders. He was also a member of the Edmonton Eskimos. Prior to turning pro, Getzlaf played with the junior team Prairie Thunder and the collegiate team Regina Rams in his hometown of Regina, Saskatchewan.

== Early life ==
Born and raised in Regina, Saskatchewan, Getzlaf grew up playing ice hockey in addition to football with his younger brother, Ryan, an NHL All-Star, two-time Olympic gold medalist and Stanley Cup champion for the Anaheim Ducks. Getzlaf is married to Tia.

== Professional career ==
=== Hamilton Tiger-Cats ===
Getzlaf was chosen by the Hamilton Tiger-Cats in the fifth round, 33rd overall, in the 2007 CFL draft. After dressing for the first two games of the season, he spent the rest of the season on two teams' practice rosters.

=== Saskatchewan Roughriders (first stint) ===
Getzlaf was traded to the Saskatchewan Roughriders with Corey Holmes in exchange for Jason Armstead on August 19, 2007. While he was on the practice roster during the Roughriders' 2007 Grey Cup victory, he still shared in the win, meaning that both he and his brother, Ryan, ended up 2007 champions with their respective teams.

Getzlaf started the 2008 season on the practice roster, but with a rash of injuries at the receiver position, he was pressed into action, making his Riders debut on Oct 3, 2008. In this game against the Calgary Stampeders, he recorded his first career CFL catch and touchdown, finishing the game with five catches for 47 yards and a touchdown. He dressed for the final five games of the season, finishing with 15 catches for 247 yards and two touchdowns. He also contributed one catch for 13 yards in the Roughriders' loss to the BC Lions in the 2008 West Semi-Final.

Heading into the 2009 season, Getzlaf spent the first four weeks as a backup receiver. After Andy Fantuz was injured in a week-4 game against Edmonton, Getzlaf started the week-5 game against the Calgary Stampeders. He had five receptions for 101 yards and two touchdowns including the opening score of the game and a 65-yard touchdown with 1:17 remaining in the game to give the Roughriders a 24–23 comeback victory. It was the first 100-yard receiving game of his career. Once Fantuz came back from injury in the Banjo Bowl, Getzlaf retained his starter's position, with Jason Clermont being relegated to a backup role; hence, he started 14 games during the regular season. Getzlaf finished with a team-leading six touchdown receptions and was tied with Andy Fantuz for the team lead in two-point conversions with two. Of his nine career touchdowns (including post-season), six have come against the Stampeders. In the 2009 West Final, Getzlaf had three catches for 21 yards and a touchdown, which was part of the 27-17 win over the Stampeders that featured all Roughrider scoring by Canadian players. He had two catches for 15 yards in the 2009 Grey Cup, a 28-27 loss to the Montreal Alouettes. On Jan. 15, 2010, it was formally announced that Getzlaf had re-signed with the Roughriders, rather than becoming a free agent. On June 20, 2012, the Riders announced that Getzlaf had signed a contract extension. Getzlaf was named the Most Valuable Canadian player in the 101st Grey Cup. On December 5, 2013, Getzlaf signed a contract extension with the Roughriders, promising to keep him in Saskatchewan through the 2015 season. After not being re-signed following the 2015 season Getzlaf became a free agent on February 9, 2016.

=== Edmonton Eskimos ===
On February 25, 2016, Getzlaf signed with the Edmonton Eskimos of the Canadian Football League. Getzlaf's tenure with the club ended after a year and a half, when he was released by the club on September 26, 2017.

=== Saskatchewan Roughriders (second stint) ===
On October 16, 2017, Getzlaf was added to the Roughriders practice roster. He was promoted to the active roster on November 12. He announced his retirement on January 4, 2018.

== CFL statistics ==
Receiving		Regular season						Playoffs
Year	Team	Games	No.	Yards	Avg	Long	TD	Games	No.	Yards	Avg	Long	TD
2007	HAM	2	0	0	0.0	0	0	Traded mid-season
2007	SSK	0	0	0	0.0	0	0	0	0	0	0.0	0	0
2008	SSK	5	15	247	16.5	55	2	1	1	13	13.0	13	0
2009	SSK	18	41	531	13.0	65	6	2	5	36	7.2	10	1
2010	SSK	18	55	946	17.2	85	5	3	12	142	11.8	30	1
2011	SSK	18	60	1,071	17.9	70	10	Team did not qualify
2012	SSK	17	65	864	13.3	40	2	1	2	19	9.5	12	0
2013	SSK	17	63	1,045	16.6	72	7	2	6	113	18.8	38	1
2014	SSK	15	36	591	16.4	57	1	1	2	40	20.0	33	0
2015	SSK	10	33	402	12.2	55	4	Team did not qualify
2016	EDM	18	41	455	11.1	24	2	2	0	0	0	0	0
2017	EDM	8	5	43	8.6	12	1	Released mid-season
2017	SSK	0	0	0	0.0	0	0	1	0	0	0.0	0	0
CFL totals		147	414	6,192	15.0	85	41	13	28	363	13.0	38	3
