= Dale West =

Canadian football player (1941–2026)

Profile
- Position: Defensive back

Personal information
- Born: 1941; Cabri, Saskatchewan, Canada
- Died: May 19, 2026 (aged 84); Regina, Saskatchewan, Canada
- Listed height: 6 ft 2 in (1.88 m)
- Listed weight: 195 lb (88 kg)

Career information
- College: Arizona
- University: Regina

Career history
- 1962–1968: Saskatchewan Roughriders

Awards and highlights
- Grey Cup champion (1966); Outstanding Canadian : West Division (1963); 3× CFL West All-Star (1963, 1964, 1965)

Dale West (1941 – May 19, 2026) was a Canadian professional football player who was a defensive back for the Saskatchewan Roughriders of the Canadian Football League (CFL) from 1962 to 1968. He won a Grey Cup with the Roughriders in 1966. He was named the Most Outstanding Canadian of the West Division in 1963 and was a three-time CFL All-Star.

== Biography ==
A graduate of the University of Regina (after attending the University of Arizona and the University of Saskatchewan on a football scholarship) West joined his hometown Roughriders for a seven-season career. Primarily a defensive back, he could punt, kick, return punts and kicks, rush and catch; 6 of his 18 pass receptions went for TDs. As a defender he won 3 all-star selections, intercepting 17 passes. 10 of those came in 1963, when he was selected as runner up for the CFL's Most Outstanding Canadian Award. Finally, West was a member of the 'Riders famed 1966 squad, which won Saskatchewan's first Grey Cup championship. West made a key interception to set up their first TD.

After his playing days West became a Roughriders Plaza of Honor inductee (1997) and lived in Regina, where he was program co-coordinator with the Saskatchewan Sports Hall of Fame and Museum and then served three terms as a trustee for the Regina School Division #4.

West died from cancer in Regina, on May 19, 2026, at the age of 84.
