= Willis Jacox =

American gridiron football player (born 1966)

No. 15, 85, 80
- Position: Wide receiver

Personal information
- Born: March 25, 1965 (age 61); Bloomington, Minnesota, U.S.
- Listed height: 5 ft 7 in (1.70 m)
- Listed weight: 170 lb (77 kg)

Career information
- High school: Kennedy (Bloomington)
- College: North Dakota (1983–1986)
- NFL draft: 1987: undrafted

Career history
- Saskatchewan Roughriders (1987); New Orleans Saints (1987); Saskatchewan Roughriders (1991–1992); BC Lions (1992); Iowa Barnstormers (1995–1997)

Awards and highlights
- Second-team All-Arena (1996)
- Stats at ArenaFan.com

Willis Francis Jacox (born March 25, 1966) is an American former professional football player.

Jacox attended the University of North Dakota in the mid-1980s, where he played both wide receiver and kick returner. Following his collegiate career, Jacox was signed by the Saskatchewan Roughriders of the Canadian Football League (CFL) in May 1987. He played for the Roughriders in parts of the 1987, 1991 and 1992 CFL seasons, leading the league in kickoff return yards (1,231 yards) in 1991. He also briefly signed with the New Orleans Saints during the 1987 NFL players strike but did not play in any games.

After his CFL career ended, Jacox played in the Arena Football League as a wide receiver for the Iowa Barnstormers. He was named second-team All-Arena in 1996.
