= Jack Hill (gridiron football) =

American gridiron football player (1932–2005)

No. 90, 84
- Positions: Wide receiver, Placekicker

Personal information
- Born: October 17, 1932; Ogden, Utah, U.S.
- Died: September 26, 2005 (aged 72); Kaysville, Utah, U.S.
- Listed height: 6 ft 1 in (1.85 m)
- Listed weight: 185 lb (84 kg)

Career information
- High school: Davis (Kaysville)
- College: Utah State (1951–1952, 1955–1956)
- NFL draft: 1956: 13th round, 151st overall pick

Career history
- Saskatchewan Roughriders (1957–1960); Denver Broncos (1961)

Awards and highlights
- CFL West All-Star (1958); Dave Dryburgh Memorial Trophy (1958)

Career NFL statistics
- Receptions: 4
- Receiving yards: 33
- Field goals made: 5
- Field goal attempts: 15
- Field goal %: 33.3
- Stats at Pro Football Reference

Jack "the Deacon" Hill was an American professional football player with the Saskatchewan Roughriders in the Canadian Football League.

Hill is from Ogden, Utah, graduated from Utah State University. He joined the Saskatchewan Roughriders in 1957, but his greatest year was 1958, when he was an all-star and scored a professional football record 145 points (16 touchdowns, 36 converts, 4 field goals and a rouge) and won the Dave Dryburgh Memorial Trophy. He played 3 more seasons with the Green Riders, but was hampered by injuries. His contract was sold to the Denver Broncos in 1961, where he caught 4 passes in 14 games. He later owned a car dealership in Utah.
