= 95th Grey Cup =

2007 Canadian Football championship game

Saskatchewan Roughriders	Winnipeg Blue Bombers
(12–6)	(10–7–1)
23	19
Head coach: Kent Austin	Head coach: Doug Berry
	1	2	3	4	Total
Saskatchewan Roughriders	0	10	6	7	23
Winnipeg Blue Bombers	3	4	7	5	19
- Date: November 25, 2007
- Stadium: Rogers Centre
- Location: Toronto
- Most Valuable Player: James Johnson, DB (Roughriders)
- Most Valuable Canadian: Andy Fantuz, WR (Roughriders)
- National anthem: Barenaked Ladies
- Coin toss: Lieutenant-Governor David Onley
- Referee: Glen Johnson
- Halftime show: Lenny Kravitz
- Attendance: 52,230

Broadcasters
- Network: CBC, RDS, CBCHD
- Announcers: (CBC) Mark Lee, Chris Walby, Elliotte Friedman, Sean Millington, Greg Frers, Steve Armitage and Khari Jones
- Ratings: 3,539,000 in Canada

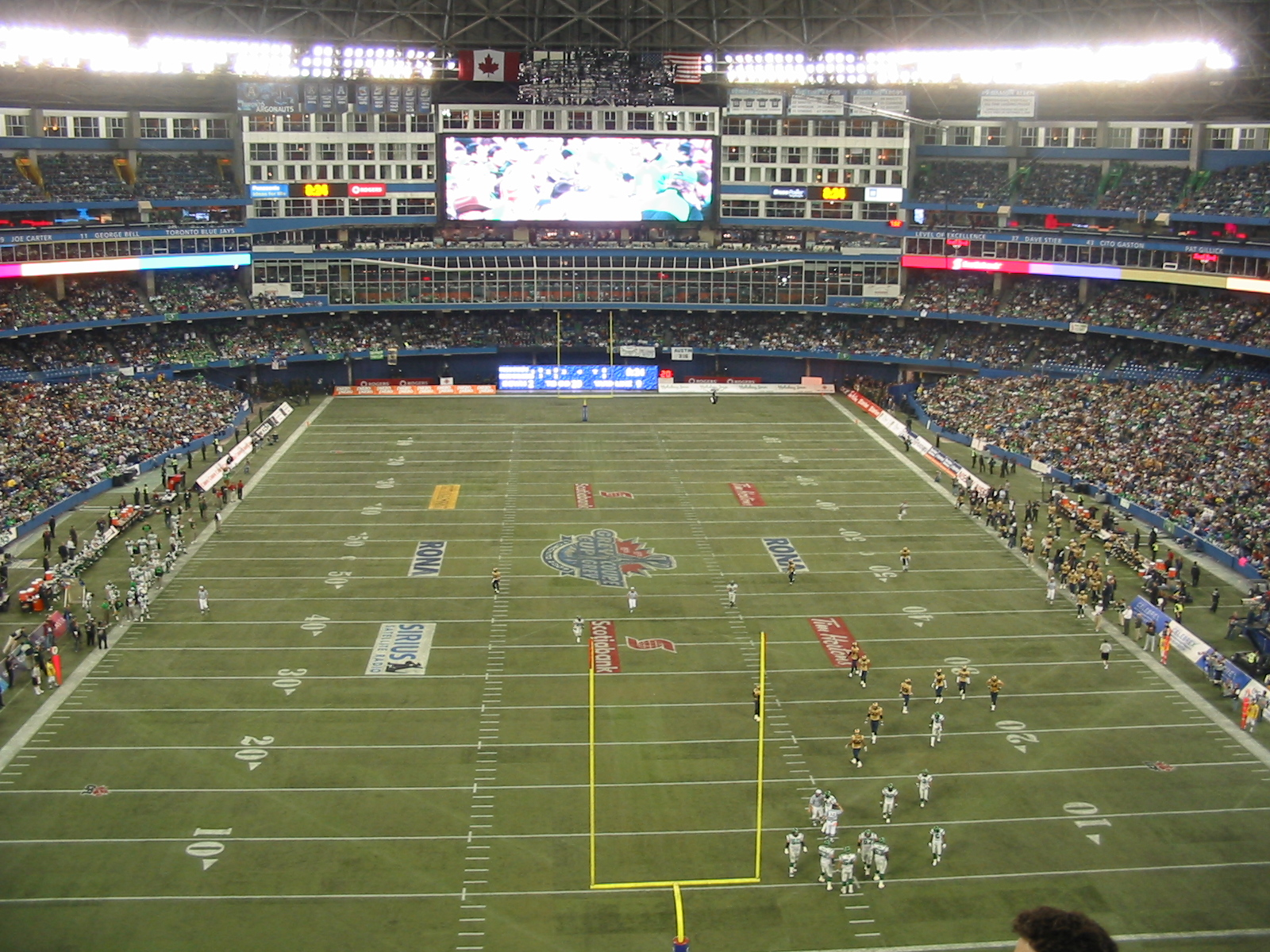
First half game action

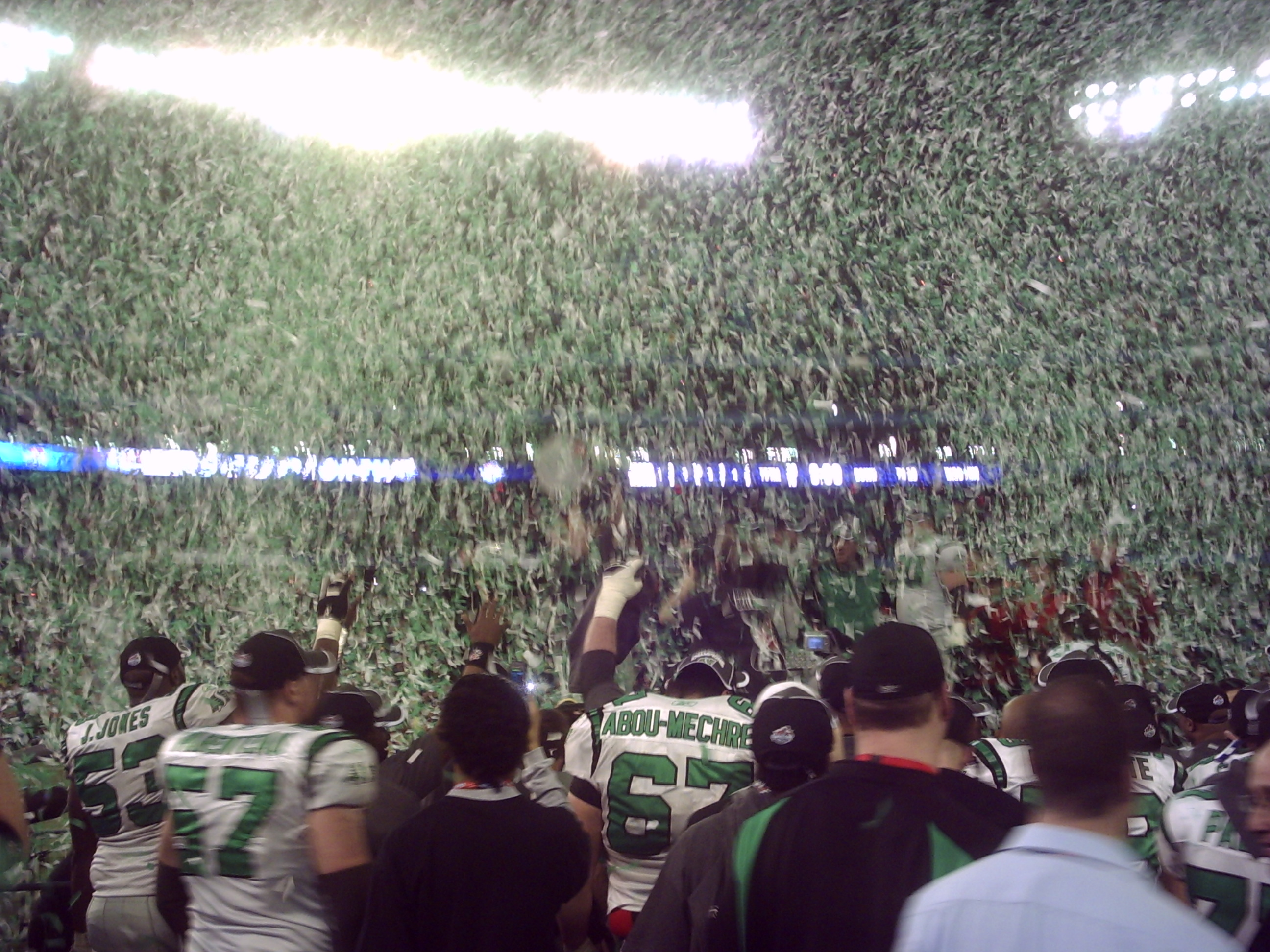
The Roughriders celebrate their victory

The 95th Grey Cup was held in Toronto at the Rogers Centre on November 25, 2007. The Grey Cup, first awarded in 1909, is the championship game of the Canadian Football League. It was played between the Saskatchewan Roughriders and the Winnipeg Blue Bombers, with the Roughriders winning 23–19. It was the first Grey Cup meeting between the two teams, and was also the first time any Labour Day Classic matchup has reoccurred in the Grey Cup.

The 95th Grey Cup was the 46th Grey Cup hosted by Toronto since the championship's inception in 1909 and the first it has hosted since 1992. SkyDome/Rogers Centre previously hosted the 77th Grey Cup in 1989 and the 80th Grey Cup in 1992. The game was announced as a sellout on November 19, 2007. Ticket prices ranged from $94 to $560.

The game was viewed by approximately 3.337 million viewers on CBC television, up from 3.202 million the previous year. This was the last Grey Cup and CFL game broadcast by CBC, as TSN became the exclusive TV home for the CFL the following season.

== Grey Cup Festivities ==
The Grey Cup festivities began with a four-day festival that had over 50 events at several venues in downtown Toronto including the Metro Toronto Convention Centre, and the CN Tower. The festival area was bounded by Spadina Avenue east to Bay Street and from Nathan Phillips Square south to Lake Ontario.

On the weekend of the Grey Cup, there was a "Celebration of Football" with games hosted at the Rogers Centre at amateur, high school, and university level, including the 43rd Vanier Cup, the CIS football championship. The Vanier Cup game was held on November 23, 2007, at Rogers Centre with the Manitoba Bisons defeating the Saint Mary's Huskies. This marked the first time the Vanier Cup has been held in conjunction with the Grey Cup.

Confirmed festival events include:

- Annual team parties (e.g. Riderville, MontreALS Huddle, Double Blue Bash, Tigertown, Lions' Den, including the nonexistent Atlantic Schooners)
- Grey Cup Chopper raffle
- Street festivals on Front Street and Bremner Street
- BMX Bike Park presented by the Argonauts' Stop The Violence foundation
- Grey Cup House built by CFL players and fans for Habitat for Humanity
- CFL Player Awards at Roy Thomson Hall
  - Includes a tribute to John Candy hosted by Dan Aykroyd
- Grey Cup Gala at Liberty Grand hosted by Brent Butt
- CN Tower party hosted by Trish Stratus
- Grey Cup Party Series hosted by Trailer Park Boys Ricky, Julian and Bubbles
- Musical acts
  - Lenny Kravitz
  - Great Big Sea
  - Barenaked Ladies
  - Spirit of the West
  - The Lowest of the Low
  - Hinder
  - Sloan
  - Kim Mitchell
  - The Trews

== Game Summary ==
The Roughriders received the opening kickoff. The teams traded possessions back and forth until a 16-yard field goal by Bombers kicker Troy Westwood gave Winnipeg an early 3-0 lead late in the opening quarter. Near the start of the second quarter, a Westwood punt had moved the Roughriders to their own 10 yard line, and they conceded a safety to make it 5-0. On Saskatchewan's next possession, they received an illegal block penalty and conceded their second consecutive safety to make the score 7-0 in Winnipeg's favour. Late in the second quarter, James Johnson intercepted Ryan Dinwiddie's attempted pass to Milt Stegall for a game-tying touchdown. Luca Congi added a field goal on the last play of the half to put Saskatchewan ahead 10-7.

On the third play of the second half, Dinwiddie fumbled, and the Roughriders capitalized with a field goal to extend their lead to 13-7. The Bombers' offence responded quickly, with Dinwiddie throwing to Derick Armstrong for a touchdown that gave Winnipeg a 14-13 lead.

Near the end of the third quarter, Johnson's second interception of the game put Saskatchewan in position for a short field goal, until Doug Brown appeared to stop Roughriders quarterback Kerry Joseph on third down, giving possession back to the Bombers. Saskatchewan coach Kent Austin successfully challenged the placement of the ball leading to Congi retaking the lead for Saskatchewan.

On the Roughriders' first possession of the fourth quarter, Joseph passed to Andy Fantuz for a touchdown, giving Saskatchewan a 9-point lead. Another well-placed punt by Westwood led to the third conceded safety by the Roughriders, leaving the Bombers within a touchdown of tying the game. Later on, a long pass interference penalty put Winnipeg into position for another Westwood field goal to make the score 23-19. On the Bombers' final possession, Johnson intercepted Dinwiddie for a CFL record third time, sealing the 23-19 win for the Saskatchewan Roughriders

=== Scoring summary ===
First Quarter
WPG – FG Westwood 16 yards 3-0 WPG

Second Quarter
WPG - Safety Boreham (conceded) 5-0 WPG
WPG - Safety Boreham (conceded) 7-0 WPG
SSK - TD Johnson 30 yard interception return (Congi convert) 7-7
SSK - FG Congi 45 yards 10-7 SSK

Third Quarter
SSK - FG Congi 17 yards 13-7 SSK
WPG - TD Armstrong 50 yard pass (Westwood convert) 14-13 WPG
SSK - FG Congi 12 yards 16-14 SSK

Fourth Quarter
SSK - TD Fantuz 29 yard pass (Congi convert) 23-14 SSK
WPG - Safety Boreham (conceded) 23-16 SSK
WPG - FG Westwood 42 yards 23-19 SSK
