= Paul McCallum (gridiron football) =

Canadian gridiron football player (born 1970)

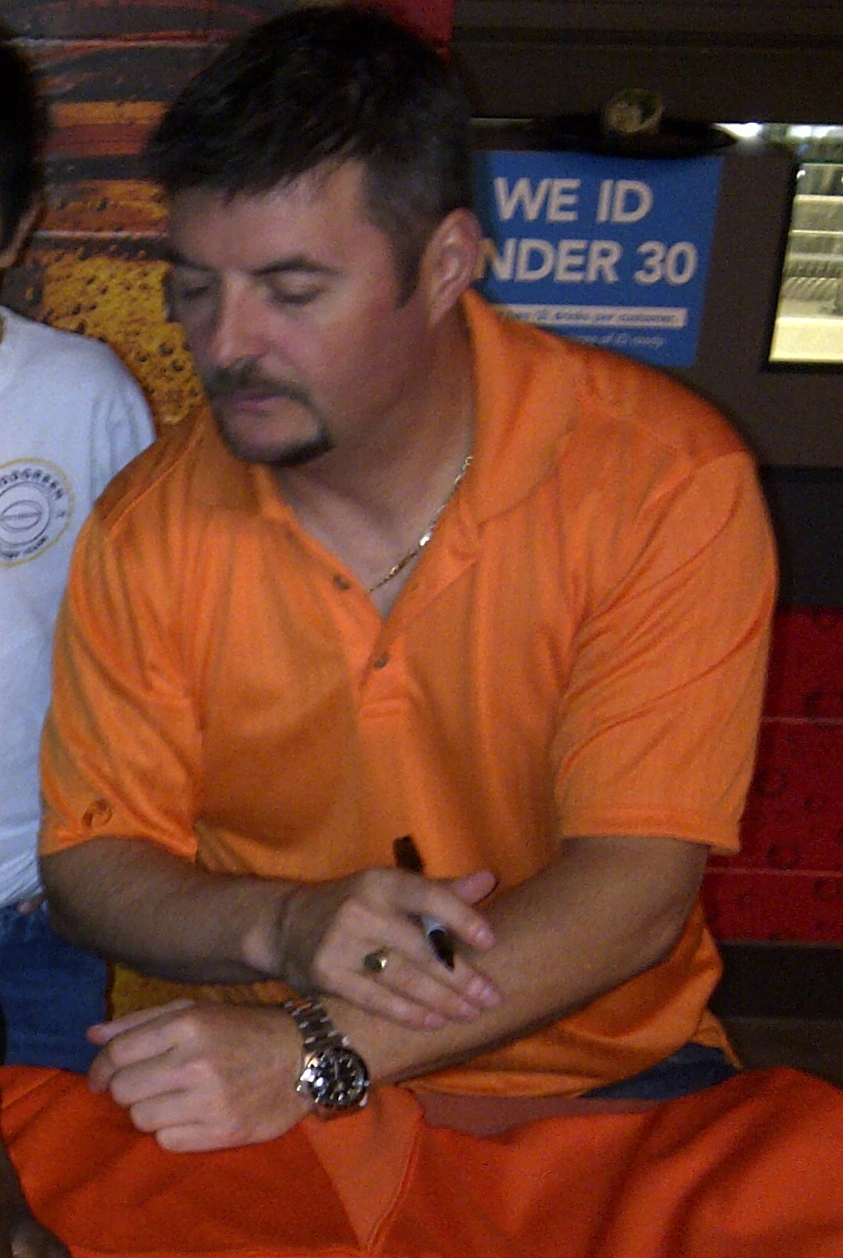
- McCallum with the BC Lions in 2013

No. 4
- Positions: Placekicker, punter

Personal information
- Born: January 7, 1970 (age 56); Vancouver, British Columbia, Canada
- Listed height: 5 ft 11 in (1.80 m)
- Listed weight: 185 lb (84 kg)

Career information
- CJFL: Surrey Rams

Career history
- 1992: BC Lions*
- 1993: Hamilton Tiger-Cats*
- 1993: BC Lions
- 1993: Ottawa Rough Riders
- 1994: BC Lions
- 1994: Saskatchewan Roughriders
- 1995: BC Lions
- 1995: Saskatchewan Roughriders
- 1996: Scottish Claymores
- 1996–2000: Saskatchewan Roughriders
- 2001: Las Vegas Outlaws
- 2001–2005: Saskatchewan Roughriders
- 2006–2014: BC Lions
- 2015: Saskatchewan Roughriders
- 2016: BC Lions
- * Offseason or practice squad member only

Awards and highlights
- 2× Grey Cup champion (2006, 2011); Dick Suderman Trophy (2006); John Agro Special Teams Award (2011); 3× Dave Dryburgh Memorial Trophy (2007, 2011, 2012); 2× CFL All-Star (2010, 2011); 6× CFL West All-Star (2003, 2007, 2008, 2010, 2011, 2014); World Bowl champion (1996)

Career CFL statistics
- Games played: 340
- Field goals made: 722
- Field goals attempted: 898
- Field goal %: 80.4
- Points scored: 3,145
- Longest field goal: 63
- Stats at CFL.ca
- Canadian Football Hall of Fame (Class of 2022)

Paul McCallum (born January 7, 1970) is a Canadian former professional football punter and placekicker who played in the Canadian Football League (CFL). He is a two-time Grey Cup champion, having won with the BC Lions in 2006 and 2011. He is also a six-time CFL West All-Star and a two-time CFL All-Star. He was also named the Grey Cup Most Valuable Canadian in 2006 and won the CFL's Most Outstanding Special Teams Award in 2011. McCallum had been a member of three different CFL franchises, one XFL team, a WLAF team, and a Scottish third division club. At the time of his retirement, McCallum was the oldest active player in the CFL, having played in 24 seasons over the course of his career.

== Junior career ==
McCallum played junior football with the Surrey Rams of the Canadian Junior Football League. He was a member of the BC Junior Football League Champion Surrey Rams who faced the Ottawa Sooners at Lansdowne Park in Ottawa for the Canadian Junior Football League Canadian Bowl Championship, losing 35-18.

== Soccer ==
After a long youth soccer career in North Vancouver, Surrey, and Delta, BC, McCallum went on to play for Team BC at the Canada Summer Games as well as national tournaments with the BC Provincial program U16 (1985) and U18 (1986–1987). He also suited up briefly for the Vancouver 86ers for a preseason tournament (while in Grade 12 at Surrey BC's Queen Elizabeth Sr Sec.) in Kelowna, BC, and scored for the club there. McCallum travelled to Scotland at 19 years of age to play professional soccer in the Scottish Third Division for clubs St. Mirren and Hamilton Academicals. His cousin, Brian O'Neill, was also a professional soccer player for Celtic FC, Wolfsburg, Derby County, Preston North End, Nottingham Forest, and Aberdeen FC.

== Amateur football career ==
After playing soccer in Scotland, he returned to Canada and began playing for the Surrey Rams Junior Football Club in the BC Junior Football League.

== Professional football career ==
=== BC Lions (I) ===
In 1992, McCallum participated at training camp and preseason with the BC Lions.

=== Hamilton Tiger-Cats ===
McCallum petitioned the CFL to allow Canadian Junior players to have the ability to attend their evaluation camp. He was successful and was ultimately added to the Negotiation List of the Hamilton Tiger Cats by Director of Player Personnel, Greg Mohns.

In March 1993, McCallum signed as a free agent with the CFL's Hamilton Tiger-Cats. He was released in June.

=== BC Lions (II) ===
In September 1993, McCallum signed with BC. He played in one game, and was released that month.

=== Ottawa Rough Riders ===
In October 1993, he signed with the Ottawa Rough Riders. During his time there, he was a teammate of former NFL Washington Redskins player Dexter Manley and former WWE wrestler Glenn Kulka. He played in three games, and was released in November.

=== BC Lions (III) ===
McCallum signed with BC in December 1993.

In 1994, he played in five games with the Lions before being released.

=== Saskatchewan Roughriders (I) ===
In October 1994, McCallum signed with the Saskatchewan Roughriders. The Roughriders were in need of a placekicker after Dave Ridgway suffered an injury. McCallum played in four regular season games, as well as the West Semi-Final against Calgary. In the playoff game, Saskatchewan lost 36-3, with McCallum accounting for all of Saskatchewan's scoring with a 34 yard field goal.

McCallum was released in December 1994.

=== BC Lions (IV) ===
McCallum signed with BC in December 1994.

In 1995, McCallum was on BC's injured reserve list until October, and was then released.

=== Saskatchewan Roughriders (II) ===
In October 1995, McCallum signed with Saskatchewan, and played in the final two regular season games. On January 17, 1996, he was released.

=== Scottish Claymores ===
McCallum once again travelled to Scotland to play professional sports, this time as the punter and placekicker for the Scottish Claymores of the World League, and was with the team when they won World Bowl 1996 at Murrayfield Stadium Sunday, June 23 where they beat the defending champions, Frankfurt Galaxy 32-27 in front of 38,982 fans. Other notable players on the Claymores roster included former Denver Broncos wide receiver Yo Murphy, former NFL quarterback Jim Ballard, as well as Scotland Rugby Union legend Gavin Hastings OBE.

=== Saskatchewan Roughriders (III) ===
On July 2, 1996, after the World Bowl, McCallum re-signed with the Roughriders. He joined the Roughriders in time to kick in the team's second regular season game against Ottawa. In game 5 when the Roughriders hosted Toronto, McCallum sustained an injury on the opening kickoff. It was determined that it was a torn ACL in his left (non-kicking) knee, and McCallum was forced to miss the remainder of the season. McCallum played in four regular season games for the Roughriders.

In 1997, McCallum kicked for the Roughriders in their 18 regular season games, 2 playoff games, and the Grey Cup loss against Toronto. He also became the team's punter after incumbent punter Brent Matich was released in June. In game 14 at Taylor Field against Edmonton, McCallum went 7 for 8 on field goals. He was also called upon to placekick 5 times instead of punt into a wind measured between 78 and 93 km-h early in the game.

In 1998, McCallum kicked 4 field goals in a Grey Cup rematch victory against Toronto in game 1.

In 1999, the Roughriders were hosting Edmonton in game 7. McCallum kicked a 52 yard field goal with 1:12 remaining in the game to help Saskatchewan win 29-27.

In 2000, Saskatchewan travelled to Edmonton in game 17. McCallum kicked a 52 yard field goal to force overtime, and the winning field goal from 43 yards in overtime to help the Roughriders win 54-52.

=== Las Vegas Outlaws ===
McCallum was the Las Vegas Outlaws' kicker during the XFL's only season in 2001, scoring the first ever points in XFL history with a 25-yard field goal against the New York/New Jersey Hitmen.

The XFL folded after its inaugural season.

=== Saskatchewan Roughriders (IV) ===
In 2001, McCallum returned to the Saskatchewan Roughriders. He kicked the winning field goal against Hamilton in game 1. He set a CFL record for the longest field goal kicked in the CFL when he booted a wind-aided 62-yard field goal against the Edmonton Eskimos on October 27, 2001 in a 12-3 victory at Taylor Field.

In 2002, McCallum kicked the winning field goal in game 1 against the expansion Ottawa Renegades in Ottawa. In game 13 against the Renegades at Taylor Field, McCallum kicked a 56 yard field goal. McCallum participated in a CFL playoff game for the first time since 1997 as the Roughriders qualified for the crossover against the Toronto Argonauts.

In 2003, McCallum was the CFL West All-Star placekicker. He kicked the winning field goals in game 16 against Calgary and the final game against BC. He participated in Saskatchewan's West Semi-Final victory in Winnipeg and West Final loss in Edmonton as placekicker and punter.

In 2004, McCallum kicked and punted for the Roughriders in all 18 regular season games and 2 playoff games. He had a challenging season. In game 1 against Toronto, McCallum missed a field goal that was returned for a touchdown by Bashir Levingston. In game 2 against Calgary, McCallum had a punt blocked for a touchdown, and was forced to throw a pass when rushed on another punt. In game 5 against Toronto, he went 3 for 7 on field goals. In game 10 against Edmonton, he suffered a separated shoulder on a block while covering a punt. He went 1 for 3 in each of game 16 against Ottawa and game 17 against Edmonton. In the West Semi-Final against Edmonton, he had a field goal attempt blocked. In the West Final against BC, McCallum went 1 for 3 on field goals, including missing a crucial 18-yard field goal in overtime. The Roughriders went on to lose the game, and outraged fans vandalized McCallum's northwest Regina home with eggs, dumped manure on his neighbour's property, and uttered death threats to his family. The incident made national news, and the football club and Regina's mayor Pat Fiacco both denounced the vandalism as an "isolated incident" of "hooliganism". On the comedy show This Hour Has 22 Minutes, Shaun Majumder (playing a Roughriders GM) apologized for calling McCallum "a bum who could be out-kicked by a goat missing a leg".

Despite McCallum's struggles that season, highlights of his season included kicking a 52 yard field goal in game 6 against Calgary. He went 6 for 6 on field goals, including the game winning field goal, in a crucial victory against Hamilton in game 13. For his efforts in this game, he was named CFL Special Teams Player of the Week.

In 2005, McCallum kicked and punted in all 18 regular season games for the Roughriders, as well as the crossover East Semi-Final against Montreal. His last field goal at Taylor Field that year was a 53 yarder in the final home game against Calgary.

=== BC Lions (V) ===
On February 23, 2006, he signed a two-year contract with the BC Lions after declining to take a 30% pay-cut from the Roughriders. In the West Final against Saskatchewan, BC built up a 32-4 third quarter lead, which Saskatchewan cut to 32-18. McCallum sealed the victory for BC with an 18 yard field goal, which was in the same spot as his miss in the playoffs two years earlier. The following week, he tied the record for most field goals in a Grey Cup when he kicked six in six attempts in the 94th Grey Cup on November 19, 2006. In his first Grey Cup win, he was awarded the Dick Suderman Trophy as the Grey Cup's most valuable Canadian for his efforts.

In 2010, McCallum set a number of career marks. Continuing from the 14 consecutive field goals he made at the end of the 2009 season, McCallum connected on 10 straight to start the season, finishing just short of Dave Ridgway's CFL record of 28 straight field goals. Throughout the season he was flirting with Lui Passaglia's record for most accurate season (90.9%), and finished with a career best 88.2% completion percentage. He also finished the regular season with a career high 46 successful field goals. Because of his standout season, McCallum was named the Lions' nominee for Most Outstanding Player, the first ever kicker in Lions' history, and Most Outstanding Canadian.

On October 8, 2011 at BC Place in Vancouver, Paul set the record, with 30, for the most all-time consecutive field goals made in the CFL, breaking the previous mark of 28 held by Dave Ridgway. Only two seasons later, his record was broken by Calgary's Rene Paredes who connected on his 31st consecutive field goal on July 26, 2013. Paul McCallum would finish the 2011 CFL season making 50 of 53 field goal attempts, for a career best 94.3% accuracy. He was recognized for his success when he was named the CFL's Most Outstanding Special Teams player for 2011.

Following up his career season with another solid season in the 2012 CFL season. He amassed 44 successful field goals in 52 attempts (84.6%). The 2012 season was McCallum's 20th year in the CFL and 7th year with the BC Lions. He is one of only 5 players to have played 20 or more years in the CFL.

During the 2013 CFL season McCallum saw a reduced number of field goal attempts, only 33, of which he converted on 28. In game 12 against Saskatchewan, he kicked the winning field goal.

In February 2014, McCallum signed a contract extension with the BC Lions. In 2014 he had his best field goal kicking season since 2011, converting 38 of 42 attempts (90.5%). His 90.5% success rate was not only league leading, but also only his second time in his career of with a conversion percentage in the 90's. His role as a punter was heavily diminished in 2014, as he only performed 12 punts for the Lions in the season. On March 23, 2015, the Lions announced that McCallum would be returning for his 23rd season in the CFL. On June 6, 2015, McCallum, age 45, was released by the Lions after refusing to retire.

"McCallum had made 75.1 per cent of his field-goal attempts (356 of 474) through the 2005 season. Subsequently, he was 11 percentage points higher (86.3), going 366-for-424." Rob Vanstone Sports Editor Regina Leader-Post

=== Saskatchewan Roughriders (V) ===
On July 1, 2015, McCallum signed with the Saskatchewan Roughriders. He played in 14 games, making 29 of 36 field goal attempts before being deactivated for the final three games of the season in favour of Tyler Crapigna. McCallum was released on December 21, 2015.

=== BC Lions (VI) ===
On March 7, 2016, McCallum signed a one-day contract to retire as a member of the BC Lions. He remained retired for about eight months before re-signing with the BC Lions prior to the last game of the 2016 regular season.

McCallum was announced as a member of the Canadian Football Hall of Fame 2022 class on June 21, 2022.

== Achievements ==
=== CFL ===
- He holds the CFL record for longest field goal made at 63 yards
- Has the fourth-highest field goal kicking accuracy in a single season at 94.3% (2011)
- 4th most games played in CFL history (340)
- 2nd most regular seasons played (24)
- 2nd most field goals scored in a CFL career (722)
- 2nd most points scored in a CFL career (3,145)
- 4th longest consecutive successful field goal attempts with 30 (2011)
- Shares the record for most 1-point converts made in a game with 9 (1994)
- Holds the record for most consecutive 1-point converts made with 801 (1993–2015)
- The only player in CFL history to play against the Ottawa Rough Riders, the Ottawa Renegades and the Ottawa RedBlacks. McCallum was also the last active player to have played for the Ottawa Rough Riders, with that franchise folding in 1996
- The last active player to have played against an American-based CFL team
- Shares the record for longest kickoff at 100 yards (1994)
- Holds the record for most consecutive successful field goal attempts with 36 (2006–2016)
- Shares the Grey Cup Record for Field Goals in a game, going 6 for 6 versus the Montreal Alouettes in the 2006 Championship game.

=== Other ===
- Last active player to have played in the 2001 version of the XFL.
- Scored the first ever points in XFL history with a 25-yard field goal against the New York/New Jersey Hitmen.
- Sport BC, Community Champion Award winner 2012
