= 77th Grey Cup =

1989 Canadian Football championship game

Saskatchewan Roughriders	Hamilton Tiger-Cats
(9–9)	(12–6)
43	40
Head coach: John Gregory	Head coach: Al Bruno
	1	2	3	4	Total
Saskatchewan Roughriders	1	21	12	9	43
Hamilton Tiger-Cats	13	14	3	10	40
- Date: November 26, 1989
- Stadium: SkyDome
- Location: Toronto
- Most Valuable Player: Offence: Kent Austin, QB (Roughriders); Defence: Chuck Klingbeil, DT (Roughriders)
- Most Valuable Canadian: Dave Ridgway, K (Roughriders)
- Referee: Dave Yule
- Attendance: 54,088

Broadcasters
- Network: CBC, Canadian Football Network, SRC
- Announcers: CBC: Don Wittman, Ron Lancaster, Brian Williams, Steve Armitage, Scott Oake. CFN: Dave Hodge, Neil Lumsden, Nick Bastaja, Bob Irving, Tom Larscheid. SRC: N/A.

The 77th Grey Cup was the 1989 Canadian Football League championship game played between the Saskatchewan Roughriders and the Hamilton Tiger-Cats at SkyDome in Toronto; this was the first Grey Cup game held at the stadium as it opened in June 1989. The Roughriders defeated the Tiger-Cats, 43–40 on Dave Ridgway's winning field-goal.

== Game summary ==
Saskatchewan Roughriders (43) – TDs, Ray Elgaard, Jeff Fairholm, Donald Narcisse, Tim McCray; FGs, Dave Ridgway (4); cons., Ridgway (4); single, Terry Baker; safety touch.

Hamilton Tiger-Cats (40) – TDs, Tony Champion (2), Derrick McAdoo (2); FGs, Paul Osbaldiston (4); cons., Osbaldiston (4).

First quarter
HAM—FG Osbaldiston 42 (10:38) HAM 3 SSK 0

HAM—FG Osbaldiston 38 (5:51) HAM 6 SSK 0

SSK—Single Baker 50 yard punt (4:09) HAM 6 SSK 1

HAM—TD Champion 13 pass from Kerrigan (Osbaldiston kick) (0:15) HAM 13 SSK 1

Second quarter
SSK—TD Elgaard 5 pass from Austin (Ridgway kick) (9:22) HAM 13 SSK 8

HAM—TD McAdoo 30 pass from Kerrigan (Osbaldiston kick) (6:59) HAM 20 SSK 8

SSK—TD Fairholm 75 pass from Austin (Ridgway kick) (6:31) HAM 20 SSK 15

HAM—TD McAdoo 1 run (Osbaldiston kick) (2:30) HAM 27 SSK 15

SSK—TD Narcisse 5 pass from Austin (Ridgway kick) (0:44) HAM 27 SSK 22

Third quarter
SSK—FG Ridgway 35 (10:42) HAM 27 SSK 25

HAM—FG Osbaldiston 40 (8:11) HAM 30 SSK 25

SSK—Safety Osbaldiston concedes in end zone (4:54) HAM 30 SSK 27

SSK—TD McCray 1-yard run (Ridgway kick) (2:51) SSK 34 HAM 30

Fourth quarter
SSK—FG Ridgway 25 (14:10) SSK 37 HAM 30

HAM—FG Osbaldiston 47 (6:21) SSK 37 HAM 33

SSK—FG Ridgway 20 (1:58) SSK 40 HAM 33

HAM—TD Champion 9 pass from Kerrigan (Osbaldiston kick) (0:44) SSK 40 HAM 40

SSK—FG Ridgway 35 (0:03) SSK 43 HAM 40

After an up-and-down regular season, finishing 9–9 on the year, the Saskatchewan Roughriders made the playoffs and were huge underdogs to make it to the Grey Cup. However, the Roughriders managed to defeat the Calgary Stampeders in the West Semi-Final 33-26 and went on to the Western Final to defeat the heavily favoured Edmonton Eskimos (who set a CFL record with 16 wins) 32–21, to reach the Grey Cup game.

In the Grey Cup game, the Riders faced the number one team in the East, the Hamilton Tiger-Cats in Toronto. The Tiger-Cats had seven all-stars in their lineup and football experts assumed that it would be a huge blowout for Hamilton.

At the beginning of the game, it seemed that the football experts were right when the jubilant Saskatchewan fans were silenced when Tiger-Cats kicker, Paul Osbaldiston kicked his first two field goals to give Hamilton an early 6–0 lead, while the Saskatchewan offence was struggling. But by the mid-way point of the second quarter, the Riders offence began to show signs of life, when QB, Kent Austin had completed touchdown passes to Ray Elgaard, Jeff Fairholm and Donald Narcisse. On the last play before end of the second quarter, Dave Ridgway came on the field to attempt his first field goal of the game, a 50-yarder to pull the game within two, but he ended up missing the field-goal and Hamilton led the game 27–22, after two quarters.

By the end of the third quarter, the Riders scored 12 points through a Dave Ridgway field goal, a safety touch and a Tim McCray touchdown, to move into a 34–30 lead. With just under two minutes left to go in the fourth quarter the Riders went ahead 40-33 after Ridgway kicked his third field goal of the day. But the Hamilton Tiger-Cats refused to surrender when trailing by seven points. With a well thought, methodical drive, Hamilton's QB Mike Kerrigan marched his team down the field and tied the game at 40-40 when wide receiver Tony Champion made an incredible acrobatic catch in the end zone with under a minute left in the fourth quarter.

Overtime loomed, but Saskatchewan still had the ball with a chance to win in regulation. With just 44 seconds left on the game clock, Riders QB Kent Austin completed three passes for 48 yards to position his team for the winning field goal at Hamilton's 26-yard line with nine seconds remaining in the game. Tiger-Cats coach Al Bruno decided to call a time-out in an attempt to make Ridgway nervous, but when Glen Suitor put down the snap from Bob Poley, Ridgway drilled 'The Kick' through the uprights to give Saskatchewan its first Grey Cup championship in 23 years.

== The Kick ==
Dave Ridgway's field goal winner was known as 'The Kick' in Saskatchewan and that same play was rated #7 in CBC's 10 best—and bizarre—Grey Cup plays in 2004.

== Aftermath ==
For the Grey Cup celebrations, 18,000 fans showed up at Taylor Field, in minus 10 degree Celsius weather to welcome back the club. A few weeks later, it was revealed that the championship run nearly bankrupted the team. Instead of a projected $85,000 profit, the Riders lost $195,000 due to the cost of the three road games. General Manager Al Ford declared that the team's debt increased to $1.6 million.

Neither head coach remained with his team for two full seasons after 1989. Bruno was fired following a 4–8 start the following season, while Gregory was ousted after a 1–6 start in 1991. Less than two weeks after his dismissal by the Roughriders, Gregory was hired by the 0-8 Tiger-Cats, replacing Bruno's successor David Beckman.

== 1989 CFL Playoffs ==
=== West Division ===
- Semi-final (November 12 @ Calgary, Alberta) Saskatchewan Roughriders 33-26 Calgary Stampeders
- Final (November 19 @ Edmonton, Alberta) Saskatchewan Roughriders 32-21 Edmonton Eskimos

=== East Division ===
- Semi-final (November 12 @ Toronto, Ontario) Winnipeg Blue Bombers 30-7 Toronto Argonauts
- Final (November 19 @ Hamilton, Ontario) Hamilton Tiger-Cats 14-10 Winnipeg Blue Bombers
