= George Reed (Canadian football) =

American gridiron football player (1939–2023)

George Reed CM SOM
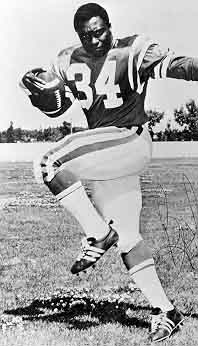
- Reed as a member of the Saskatchewan Roughriders

No. 34
- Position: Running back

Personal information
- Born: October 2, 1939; Vicksburg, Mississippi, U.S.
- Died: October 1, 2023 (aged 83); Regina, Saskatchewan, Canada
- Listed height: 6 ft 0 in (1.83 m)
- Listed weight: 205 lb (93 kg)

Career information
- College: Washington State

Career history

Playing
- 1963–1975: Saskatchewan Roughriders

Operations
- 1972–1981: CFLPA (President)
- 1986–1993: CFLPA (President)

Awards and highlights
- Grey Cup champion (1966); Grey Cup Most Valuable Player (1966); CFL's Most Outstanding Player Award (1965); Jeff Nicklin Memorial Trophy (1965); 6× Eddie James Memorial Trophy (1965-1969, 1974); Tom Pate Memorial Award (1976); 9× CFL All-Star (1965–1969, 1971–1974); 10× CFL West All-Star (1965–1969, 1971–1975); Saskatchewan Roughriders No. 34 retired; 2× Second-team All-PCC (1961, 1962)
- Canadian Football Hall of Fame (Class of 1979)

George Robert Reed CM SOM (October 2, 1939 – October 1, 2023) was an American college football and Canadian Football League (CFL) player. Reed, along with Mike Pringle and Johnny Bright, is one of the players most often mentioned as being the greatest running back in CFL history. In November 2006, Reed was voted the second greatest CFL player ever in CFL's Top 50 players of the league's modern era by Canadian sports network TSN.

Reed played his entire 13-year professional football career for the CFL Saskatchewan Roughriders and his No. 34 jersey is one of eight that has been retired by the club.

== Early life and college ==
Born on October 2, 1939, in Vicksburg, Mississippi, George Reed Jr. was the third of twelve children of Maggie and George Reed Sr. to grow up in Seattle, where his father began working in a steel factory during the Second World War.

After high school, Reed played Pacific-8 Conference college football with the Washington State University Cougars from 1959 to 1962 where he was teamed with fellow Canadian Football Hall of Famer Hugh Campbell. During his stint at Washington State, Reed broke his leg during practice prior to the 1960 Washington State Cougars season, but returned in 1961.

== Professional football ==
Following college, Reed signed with the Saskatchewan Roughriders where he started for 13 years from 1963 until 1975, playing 203 games. By the time he retired, Reed held career records in rushing yards (16,116), rushing touchdowns (134), and touchdowns (137). Reed's rushing yards total has since been surpassed by National Football League stars Walter Payton, then Emmitt Smith, and also by CFL star Mike Pringle. Reed is also tied with Pringle with a total of 137 career touchdowns. a record which was later broken by Milt Stegall, George Reed still holds the CFL rushing for touchdowns record at 134.

George Reed was voted the CFL's Most Outstanding Player for 1965 and in 1976 he was the inaugural winner of the Tom Pate Memorial Trophy for playing ability and community service. He was the MVP of the 54th Grey Cup of 1966, as the Saskatchewan Roughriders defeated the Ottawa Rough Riders, his sole Grey Cup win.

When he became the CFL's all-time leading rusher in 1973, he was honoured with the unique proclamation of October 7 as George Reed Day in Regina, Saskatchewan.

After his retirement from playing before the 1976 season, his No. 34 jersey was retired by the Roughriders on October 24, 1976.

In 1972, while still an active player, Reed became the fourth president of the Canadian Football League Players' Association (CFLPA). He was the CFLPA's first American and first black president. He maintained the CFLPA presidency until 1981, six years after his retirement from the CFL. Reed returned as the sixth president of the CFLPA from 1986 to 1993.

=== Career regular season rushing statistics ===
| Year | Team | GP | Rush | Yards | Y/R | Lg | TD |
|---|---|---|---|---|---|---|---|
| 1963 | Saskatchewan Roughriders | 15 | 173 | 751 | 4.3 | 22 | 5 |
| 1964 | Saskatchewan Roughriders | 16 | 185 | 1012 | 5.5 | 55 | 10 |
| 1965 | Saskatchewan Roughriders | 16 | 274 | 1768 | 6.5 | 46 | 12 |
| 1966 | Saskatchewan Roughriders | 16 | 266 | 1409 | 5.3 | 71 | 6 |
| 1967 | Saskatchewan Roughriders | 16 | 302 | 1471 | 4.9 | 50 | 15 |
| 1968 | Saskatchewan Roughriders | 16 | 268 | 1222 | 4.6 | 69 | 16 |
| 1969 | Saskatchewan Roughriders | 16 | 273 | 1353 | 5.0 | 29 | 12 |
| 1970 | Saskatchewan Roughriders | 15 | 193 | 821 | 4.3 | 21 | 5 |
| 1971 | Saskatchewan Roughriders | 16 | 218 | 1146 | 5.3 | 56 | 12 |
| 1972 | Saskatchewan Roughriders | 16 | 224 | 1069 | 4.8 | 59 | 13 |
| 1973 | Saskatchewan Roughriders | 16 | 256 | 1193 | 4.7 | 23 | 12 |
| 1974 | Saskatchewan Roughriders | 16 | 288 | 1447 | 5.0 | 26 | 5 |
| 1975 | Saskatchewan Roughriders | 16 | 323 | 1454 | 4.5 | 22 | 11 |
| CFL totals | | 203 | 3243 | 16,116 | 5.0 | 71 | 134 |

== Later life ==
Reed remained in Saskatchewan after he retired from playing football and for decades was active in the local community with various charities and organizations. A naturalized Canadian citizen who was the Director of Guest and Community Relations at SaskGaming, Reed was made a Member of the Order of Canada in 1978, Canada's highest civilian honour, and in 1979 was inducted into the Canadian Football Hall of Fame.

Reed's daughter, Georgette Reed, represented Canada in the women's shot put competition at the 1992 Summer Olympics.

In 2012, in honour of the 100th Grey Cup, Canada Post used his image on a series of commemorative postage stamps. The image was also used on presentation posters and other materials to promote the Grey Cup game and other celebrations associated with the centennial.

In November 2019, a stretch of road along the north end of the Roughriders' current home, Mosaic Stadium, was renamed "George Reed Way" in his honour, with the stadium's official address changed to 1734 George Reed Way. A statue of Reed, erected in September 2017, stands outside the stadium. Artist Gary Tillery sculpted the bronze statue.

In November 9, 2022, Globe Theatre located in Regina produced a live theatre show based on George Reed's CFL life (1963 to 1975) in Regina. The play is written by Munish Sharma.

Reed died on October 1, 2023, one day before his 84th birthday. Shortly afterwards, fifty years after he became the CFL's all-time leading rusher, he was once again honoured in Saskatchewan with the proclamation of October 7 as George Reed Day.

On November 17, 2023, the CFL announced that the top award for players in the league would be renamed "The George Reed Most Outstanding Player Award" in Reed's honour.
