= Jeff Fairholm =

Canadian gridiron football player (born 1965)

Profile
- Positions: Wide receiver, Slotback

Personal information
- Born: November 7, 1965 (age 60); Montreal, Quebec, Canada

Career information
- High school: Appleby College
- College: Arizona

Career history
- 1988–1993: Saskatchewan Roughriders
- 1994–1996: Toronto Argonauts

Awards and highlights
- 2× Grey Cup champion (1989, 1996); CFL Western All-Star (1989); Jackie Parker Trophy (1988); Dr. Beattie Martin Trophy (1989); Roughriders' Plaza of Honour (2005)

Jeff Fairholm (born November 7, 1965) is a Canadian former professional football player. He played for the Saskatchewan Roughriders and Toronto Argonauts in the Canadian Football League as a slotback and wide receiver. He was a member of Saskatchewan's Grey Cup winning team of 1989. He played college football at the University of Arizona but did not graduate with a degree and high school football at Appleby College in Oakville, Ontario.

Fairholm starred for the Roughriders from 1988 to 1993. He was named the Western Division's rookie-of-the-year in 1988 (Jackie Parker Trophy). The following year, he won the Dr. Beattie Martin Trophy, was runner up for the CFL's Most Outstanding Canadian Award and helped Saskatchewan win its second Grey Cup in franchise history.

He had 53 touchdown catches — including a franchise-record 107-yarder in 1990 — over six seasons with Saskatchewan. Over the final three years, he averaged 72 catches and 1,325 yards per season.

Fairholm retired after winning the Grey Cup with the Argonauts at the conclusion of the 1996 season. He later spent two seasons as a receivers coach for the Argonauts.

In 2005, Fairholm was inducted into the Roughriders' Hall of Fame — the Plaza of Honour. He is the son of former Montreal Alouettes defensive back Larry Fairholm.
