= Ray Elgaard =

Canadian gridiron football player (born 1959)

No. 81
- Position: Slotback

Personal information
- Born: August 29, 1959 (age 67); Edmonton, Alberta, Canada
- Listed height: 6 ft 3 in (1.91 m)
- Listed weight: 220 lb (100 kg)

Career information
- College: Utah
- CFL draft: 1983: 2nd round, 12th overall pick

Career history
- 1983–1996: Saskatchewan Roughriders

Awards and highlights
- Grey Cup champion (1989); 3× CFL's Most Outstanding Canadian Award (1988, 1990, 1992); 4× CFL All-Star (1985, 1988, 1992, 1993); 6× CFL West All-Star (1985, 1987, 1988, 1990, 1992, 1993); Dr. Beattie Martin Trophy (1988); Saskatchewan Plaza of Honor (1999); Ranked 36th of TSN's Top 50 players
- Canadian Football Hall of Fame (Class of 2002)

Raymond Elgaard (born August 29, 1959) is a former Canadian Football League (CFL) slotback for the Saskatchewan Roughriders from 1983 through 1996, including winning the 77th Grey Cup in 1989. A big man, he was noted for his reliability as a receiver and his toughness on the field. He retired as the all-time leader in receptions and receiving yards in the Canadian Football League (830 receptions, 13,198 receiving yards, eight 1,000 yard seasons).

Elgaard played rugby for Magee Secondary School and the Kats, college football at the University of Utah, and now resides in Las Vegas. He was a three-time CFL Most Outstanding Canadian and a four-time CFL All-Star. He is a member of the Canadian Football Hall of Fame and in November, 2006 was voted one of the CFL's Top 50 players (#36) of the league's modern era by Canadian sports network TSN.

During the off-season in the mid-1980s, Elgaard was known for waiting tables in the most popular nightclub in Regina, “Checkers” in the south-Regina Landmark Inn. Due to Ray's impressive size, other wait-staff were often seen “drafting” behind Elgaard as he pushed through the crowd while making his rounds.
