= Toronto Argonauts all-time records and statistics =

The following is a list of Toronto Argonauts all time records and statistics current to the 2026 CFL season. Each category lists the top five players, where known, except for when the fifth place player is tied in which case all players with the same number are listed.

== Grey Cup championships ==
Grey Cup championships as a player

Championships	Players
6	Jack Wedley
5	Joe Krol, Bill Zock, Les Ascott
4	Royal Copeland
3	Teddy Morris, Frankie Morris, Bill Stukus, Wes Cutler, Pinball Clemons, Mike O'Shea, Paul Masotti, Adrion Smith, Noah Cantor

Grey Cup championships as a head coach

Championships	Coach	Years
3	Ted Morris	1933, 1937, 1938
3	Lew Hayman	1945, 1946, 1947
2	Don Matthews	1996, 1997
2	Frank Clair	1950, 1952
2	Ryan Dinwiddie	2022, 2024

== Regular season games played ==
Regular season games played leaders

Rank	Games	Name	Years
1	222	Don Moen	1982–94
2	208	Noel Prefontaine	1998–2007, 2010–13
3	205	Danny Nykoluk	1955–71
3	205	Mike O'Shea	1996–99, 2001–08
5	198	Jeff Johnson	2000–13
6	195	Chad Folk	1997–2008
7	190	Paul Masotti	1988–99
8	185	Michael Clemons	1989–2000
9	183	Jude St. John	1999–2008
10	175	Dan Ferrone	1981–92

== Scoring ==
Most points – career

Rank	Points	Player	Years
1	1,498	Lance Chomyc	1985–93
2	1,232	Noel Prefontaine	1998–2007, 2010–13
3	899	Zenon Andrusyshyn	1971–77, 1980–82
4	862	Lirim Hajrullahu	2016–17, 2024–26
5	549	Mike Vanderjagt	1996–97, 2008

Most points – season

Rank	Points	Player	Year
1	236	Lance Chomyc	1991
2	208	Lirim Hajrullahu	2025
3	207	Lance Chomyc	1988
4	202	Lirim Hajrullahu	2024
5	200	Lance Chomyc	1990

Most points – game

Rank	Points	Player	Opponent	Date
1	27	Cookie Gilchrist	Montreal Alouettes	October 30, 1960
T-2	25	Lance Chomyc	Ottawa Rough Riders	October 14, 1988
T-2	25	Lirim Hajrullahu	Montreal Alouettes	September 28, 2024
T-4	24	Dick Shatto	Hamilton Tiger-Cats	October 13, 1958
T-4	24	Bill Symons	Ottawa Rough Riders	September 7, 1970

Most touchdowns – career

Rank	TDs	Player	Years
1	91	Dick Shatto	1954–65
2	85	Michael Clemons	1989–2000
3	77	Derrell Mitchell	1997–2003, 2007
4	53	Darrell K. Smith	1986–92
5	50	Terry Greer	1980–85

Most touchdowns – season

Rank	TDs	Player	Year
1	20	Darrell K. Smith	1990
T-2	18	Lester Brown	1984
T-2	18	Robert Drummond	1997
4	17	Robert Drummond	1996
5	17	Derrell Mitchell	1997

Most touchdowns – game

Rank	TDs	Player	Opponent	Date
T-1	4	Dick Shatto	Hamilton Tiger-Cats	October 3, 1958
T-1	4	Bill Symons	Ottawa Rough Riders	September 7, 1970
T-1	4	Darrell K. Smith	Hamilton Tiger-Cats	September 29, 1990
T-1	4	Robert Drummond	Hamilton Tiger-Cats	November 2, 1996
T-1	4	Derrell Mitchell	BC Lions	September 12, 1998

Most rushing touchdowns – career

Rank	TDs	Player	Years
1	38	Dick Shatto	1954–65
2	33	Bill Symons	1967–1973
3	32	Gill Fenerty	1987–1989
4	31	Michael Clemons	1989–2000
5	27	Robert Drummond	1996–2002

Most rushing touchdowns – season

Rank	TDs	Player	Year
1	14	James Franklin	2018
T-2	12	Gill Fenerty	1987
T-2	12	Robert Drummond	1997
4	11	Robert Drummond	1996
5	10	Lester Brown	1984

Most rushing touchdowns – game

Rank	TDs	Player	Opponent	Date
T-1	4	Robert Drummond	Hamilton Tiger-Cats	November 2, 1996
T-1	4	Robert Drummond	Montreal Alouettes	July 31, 1997
T-3	3	Bill Symons	Ottawa Rough Riders	September 7, 1970
T-3	3	Gill Fenerty	Hamilton Tiger-Cats	September 20, 1987

Most receiving touchdowns – career

Rank	TDs	Player	Years
1	74	Derrell Mitchell	1997–2003, 2007
T-2	52	Dick Shatto	1954–65
T-2	52	Darrell K. Smith	1986–92
4	47	Terry Greer	1980–85
5	46	Michael Clemons	1989–2000

Most receiving touchdowns – season

Rank	TDs	Player	Year
1	20	Darrell K. Smith	1990
2	17	Derrell Mitchell	1997
3	15	Al Pfeifer	1955
T-4	14	Terry Greer	1984
T-4	14	Derrell Mitchell	2000

Most receiving touchdowns – game

Rank	TDs	Player	Opponent	Date
T-1	4	Royal Copeland	Montreal Alouettes	October 27, 1945
T-1	4	Darrell K. Smith	Hamilton Tiger-Cats	September 29, 1990
T-1	4	Derrell Mitchell	BC Lions	September 12, 1998

Most interception return touchdowns – career

Rank	TDs	Player	Years
1	9	Byron Parker	2005–11
T-2	5	Ed Berry	1988–92, 1996
T-2	5	Adrion Smith	1996–05
T-2	5	Clifford Ivory	2002–06
5	4	Dick Thornton	1967–72

Most interception return touchdowns – season

Rank	TDs	Player	Year
1	4	Byron Parker	2006
2	3	Vernon Mitchell	2000
T-3	2	Dick Thornton	1969
T-3	2	Dick Thornton	1971
T-3	2	Clifford Ivory	2003

Most interception return touchdowns – game

Rank	TDs	Player	Opponent	Date
1	3	Vernon Mitchell	Hamilton Tiger-Cats	October 7, 2000
2	2	Byron Parker	Hamilton Tiger-Cats	September 9, 2006

Most kickoff return touchdowns – career

Rank	TDs	Player	Years
1	3	Bashir Levingston	2002–07
T-2	2	Tony Miles	2003–07
T-2	2	Dominique Dorsey	2007–09
T-2	2	Janarion Grant	2024–26

Most kickoff return touchdowns – season

Rank	TDs	Player	Year
T-1	2	Bashir Levingston	2003
T-1	2	Tony Miles	2003

Most punt return touchdowns – career

Rank	TDs	Player	Years
T-1	8	Michael Clemons	1989–2000
T-1	8	Bashir Levingston	2002–07
T-3	5	Jimmy Cunningham	1995–96, 2002
T-3	5	Chad Owens	2010–15
T-3	5	Janarion Grant	2024–26

Most punt return touchdowns – season

Rank	TDs	Player	Year
1	4	Javon Leake	2023
T-2	3	Jimmy Cunningham	1995
T-2	3	Bashir Levingston	2003
T-2	3	Janarion Grant	2024

Most missed field goal return touchdowns – career

Rank	TDs	Player	Years
1	4	Bashir Levingston	2002–07

Most missed field goal return touchdowns – season

Rank	TDs	Player	Year
T-1	2	Bashir Levingston	2004
T-1	2	Chad Owens	2010

== Passing ==
Most passing yards – career

Rank	Yards	Name	Years
1	20,205	Ricky Ray	2012–2018
2	16,619	Condredge Holloway	1981–86
3	13,974	Damon Allen	2003–07
4	13,261	McLeod Bethel-Thompson	2017–19, 2021–22
5	11,938	Chad Kelly	2022–26

Most passing yards – season

Rank	Yards	Name	Year
1	5,720	Doug Flutie	1996
2	5,546	Ricky Ray	2017
3	5,505	Doug Flutie	1997
4	5,082	Damon Allen	2005
5	5,067	Chad Kelly	2026

Most passing yards – game

Rank	Yards	Name	Opponent	Date
1	524	Tobin Rote	Montreal Alouettes	August 19, 1960
2	522	Ronnie Knox	Ottawa Rough Riders	October 25, 1958
3	506	Ricky Ray	Hamilton Tiger-Cats	June 25, 2017
4	505	Ricky Ray	Winnipeg Blue Bombers	October 24, 2013
5	501	Kerwin Bell	Edmonton Eskimos	September 26, 1998

Most pass attempts – career

Rank	Attempts	Name	Years
1	2,476	Ricky Ray	2012–2018
2	1,988	Condredge Holloway	1981–86
3	1,713	Damon Allen	2003–07
4	1,683	McLeod Bethel-Thompson	2017–19, 2021–22
5	1,350	Doug Flutie	1996–97

Most pass attempts – season

Rank	Attempts	Name	Year
1	677	Doug Flutie	1996
2	673	Doug Flutie	1997
3	668	Ricky Ray	2017
4	620	Ricky Ray	2014
5	579	McLeod Bethel-Thompson	2022

Most pass attempts – game

Rank	Attempts	Name	Opponent	Date
1	56	Chad Kelly	Ottawa Redblacks	September 7, 2024
2	55	Ricky Ray	Ottawa Redblacks	July 24, 2017
3	54	Tobin Rote	Montreal Alouettes	August 19, 1960
T-4	53	Condredge Holloway	Winnipeg Blue Bombers	October 11, 1982
T-4	53	Kent Austin	Winnipeg Blue Bombers	August 3, 1985

Most pass completions – career

Rank	Comp	Name	Years
1	1,757	Ricky Ray	2012–2018
2	1,149	Condredge Holloway	1981–86
3	1,125	McLeod Bethel-Thompson	2017–19, 2021–22
4	1,051	Damon Allen	2003–07
5	864	Doug Flutie	1996–97

Most pass completions – season

Rank	Comp	Name	Year
1	474	Ricky Ray	2017
2	434	Doug Flutie	1996
3	430	Doug Flutie	1997
4	425	Ricky Ray	2014
5	387	McLeod Bethel-Thompson	2022

Most pass completions – game

Rank	Comp	Name	Opponent	Date
1	40	Ricky Ray	Ottawa Redblacks	July 24, 2017
2	39	Ricky Ray	Winnipeg Blue Bombers	October 24, 2013
3	38	Tobin Rote	Montreal Alouettes	August 19, 1960
4	37	McLeod Bethel-Thompson	Winnipeg Blue Bombers	August 1, 2019
T-5	36	Condredge Holloway	Winnipeg Blue Bombers	October 11, 1982
T-5	36	Kerwin Bell	Saskatchewan Roughriders	September 15, 2000
T-5	36	McLeod Bethel-Thompson	Montreal Alouettes	August 25, 2019
T-5	36	Chad Kelly	Ottawa Redblacks	September 7, 2024

Most consecutive pass completions – game

Rank	Comp	Name	Opponent	Date
1	21	Ricky Ray	Winnipeg Blue Bombers	October 24, 2013
T-2	17	Mike Rae	Montreal Alouettes	August 27, 1975
T-2	17	Ricky Ray	Edmonton Eskimos	August 18, 2013
4	15	Ricky Ray	Montreal Alouettes	August 19, 2017
5	13	Damon Allen	Calgary Stampeders	October 16, 2004

Highest pass completions percentage – career (minimum 300 attempts)

Rank	Yards	Name	Years
1	71.0	Ricky Ray	2012–18
2	69.8	Trevor Harris	2012–15
3	70.0	Nick Arbuckle	2021, 2024–26
4	69.0	Chad Kelly	2022–26
5	66.8	McLeod Bethel-Thompson	2017–19, 2021–22

Highest pass completions percentage – season (minimum 175 attempts)

Rank	Yards	Name	Years
1	77.2	Ricky Ray	2013
2	74.5	Ricky Ray	2016
3	72.4	Nick Arbuckle	2025
4	71.0	Trevor Harris	2015
5	71.0	Ricky Ray	2017

Highest pass completions percentage – game (minimum 20 attempts)

Rank	Percentage	Name	Comp/Att	Opponent	Date
1	95.0	Ricky Ray	19 of 20	Winnipeg Blue Bombers	July 19, 2013
2	88.9	Trevor Harris	24 of 27	Edmonton Eskimos	June 27, 2015
3	87.1	Condredge Holloway	27 of 31	Saskatchewan Roughriders	July 12, 1985
4	86.8	Ricky Ray	33 of 38	Calgary Stampeders	September 13, 2014
5	86.7	Ricky Ray	39 of 45	Winnipeg Blue Bombers	October 24, 2013

Most passing touchdowns – career

Rank	TDs	Name	Years
1	114	Ricky Ray	2012–2018
2	98	Condredge Holloway	1981–86
3	77	Damon Allen	2003–07
4	76	Doug Flutie	1996–97
5	70	McLeod Bethel-Thompson	2017–19, 2021–22

Most passing touchdowns – season

Rank	TDs	Name	Years
1	47	Doug Flutie	1997
2	38	Tobin Rote	1960
T-3	33	Damon Allen	2005
T-3	33	Trevor Harris	2015
T-3	33	Chad Kelly	2026

Most passing touchdowns – game

Rank	TDs	Name	Opponent	Date
T-1	7	Tobin Rote	Montreal Alouettes	October 1, 1960
T-1	7	Tobin Rote	Montreal Alouettes	October 30, 1960
T-1	7	Rickey Foggie	Hamilton Tiger-Cats	September 29, 1990
T-4	6	Joe Barnes	Edmonton Eskimos	July 22, 1984
T-4	6	Doug Flutie	Winnipeg Blue Bombers	September 7, 1997

Highest passer rating – season (minimum 175 attempts)

Rank	QBR	Name	Year
1	126.4	Ricky Ray	2013
2	109.6	Chad Kelly	2023
3	106.1	Ricky Ray	2016
4	104.0	Chad Kelly	2026
4	103.4	Nick Arbuckle	2025

Best TD to INT ratio – season (minimum 12 TD)

Rank	Ratio	Name	TDs	INTs	Year
1	10.5	Ricky Ray	21	2	2013 (CFL record)
2	4.2	Rickey Foggie	21	5	1990
3	3.6	Condredge Holloway	18	5	1982
4	3.0	Damon Allen	12	4	2004

== Rushing ==
Most rushing yards – career

Rank	Yards	Player	Years
1	7,007	Dick Shatto	1954–65
2	5,341	Michael Clemons	1989–2000
3	4,280	Bill Symons	1967–73
4	3,712	Ulysses Curtis	1950–54
5	3,348	Michael Jenkins	2000–01, 2003

Most Rushing Yards – Season

Rank	Yards	Player	Year
1	1,484	Michael Jenkins	2001
2	1,359	Cory Boyd	2010
3	1,247	Gill Fenerty	1989
4	1,141	Cory Boyd	2011
5	1,134	Robert Drummond	1997

Most rushing yards – game

Rank	Yards	Player	Opponent / Date
1	215	Gill Fenerty	vs. Calgary Stampeders, August 31, 1988
2	208	Ulysses Curtis	vs. Montreal Alouettes, September 6, 1952
3	202	Corky Tharp	vs. Ottawa Rough Riders, October 29, 1955
4	195	Michael Jenkins	vs. Edmonton Eskimos, August 17, 2003
5	190	James Wilder Jr.	vs. Edmonton Eskimos, September 17, 2017

Most rushing attempts – career

Rank	Attempts	Player	Years
1	1,322	Dick Shatto	1954–65
2	1,081	Michael Clemons	1989–2000
3	807	Bill Symons	1967–73
4	625	Gill Fenerty	1987–89
5	610	Michael Jenkins	2000–01, 2003

Most rushing attempts – season

Rank	Attempts	Player	Year
1	271	Michael Jenkins	2001
2	245	Gill Fenerty	1989
3	226	Cory Boyd	2010
4	209	Jamal Robertson	2009
5	205	Doyle Orange	1975

Most rushing attempts – game

Rank	Attempts	Player	Opponent / Date
1	37	Doyle Orange	vs. Hamilton Tiger-Cats, August 13, 1975
2	32	Dick Shatto	at Hamilton Tiger-Cats, October 8, 1955
3	32	Dave Thelen	vs. BC Lions, September 25, 1966
4	29	Corky Tharp	vs. Ottawa Rough Riders, October 29, 1955
T-5	28	William Miller	at Montreal Alouettes, November 9, 1986
T-5	28	Gill Fenerty	vs. Calgary Stampeders, August 31, 1988
T-5	28	Michael Jenkins	at Montreal Alouettes, November 5, 2000

Most 100-yard rushing games – season

Rank	100-yard games	Player	Year
1	8	Michael Jenkins	2001
T-2	6	Bill Symons	1968
T-2	6	Gill Fenerty	1989
T-2	6	Cory Boyd	2010
T-5	5	Leon McQuay	1971
T-5	5	Cory Boyd	2011

== Receiving ==
Most receiving yards – career

Rank	Yards	Player	Years
1	9,047	Derrell Mitchell	1997–2003, 2007
2	8,772	Paul Masotti	1988–99
3	8,144	Darrell K. Smith	1986–92
4	7,015	Michael Clemons	1989–2000
5	6,817	Terry Greer	1980–85

Most receiving yards – season

Rank	Yards	Player	Year
1	2,003	Terry Greer	1983
2	2,000	Derrell Mitchell	1998
3	1,826	Darrell K. Smith	1990
4	1,466	Terry Greer	1982
5	1,462	S. J. Green	2017

Most receiving yards – game

Rank	Yards	Player	Opponent / Date
1	246	Terry Greer	vs. Hamilton Tiger-Cats, September 10, 1982
2	244	Paul Masotti	vs. Calgary Stampeders, October 27, 1995
3	243	Terry Greer	vs. BC Lions, September 10, 1983
4	230	Terry Greer	vs. Ottawa Rough Riders, August 19, 1983
5	227	Manny Hazard	vs. Ottawa Rough Riders, August 26, 1993

Most receptions – career

Rank	Receptions	Player	Years
1	682	Michael Clemons	1989–2000
2	609	Derrell Mitchell	1997–03, 2007
3	556	Paul Masotti	1988–99
4	466	Dick Shatto	1954–65
5	465	Darrell K. Smith	1986–92

Most receptions – season

Rank	Receptions	Player	Year
1	160	Derrell Mitchell	1998
2	122	Michael Clemons	1997
3	116	Michael Clemons	1996
4	113	Terry Greer	1983
5	104	S. J. Green	2017

Most receptions – game

Rank	Receptions	Player	Opponent / Date
1	16	Terry Greer	vs. Ottawa Rough Riders, August 19, 1983
1	16	Derrell Mitchell	vs. Edmonton Eskimos, September 26, 1998
3	15	Terry Greer	vs. Winnipeg Blue Bombers, October 11, 1982
3	15	Michael Clemons	vs. BC Lions, October 4, 1997
5	14	Derrell Mitchell	vs. Saskatchewan Roughriders, September 15, 2000

== Yards from scrimmage ==
Most yards from scrimmage – career

Rank	Yards	Player	Breakdown
1	13,961	Dick Shatto	7,007 yards rushing, 6,684 yards receiving
2	12,356	Michael Clemons	5,341 yards rushing, 7,015 yards receiving
3	9,178	Derrell Mitchell	130 yards rushing, 9,048 yards receiving
4	8,772	Paul Masotti	8,772 yards receiving
5	8,251	Darrell K. Smith	107 yards rushing, 8,144 yards receiving

Most yards from scrimmage – season

Rank	Yards	Player	Year
1	2,019	Derrell Mitchell	1998 (19 yards rushing, 2,000 yards receiving)

Most yards from scrimmage – game

Rank	Yards	Player	Opponent / Date
1	276	Gill Fenerty	vs. Calgary Stampeders, August 31, 1988

== Combined yards ==
Most combined yards, career

Rank	Yards	Name	Breakdown
1	25,438	Michael Clemons	5,341 yards rushing; 7,015 yards receiving; 13,082 kick return yards
2	15,717	Dick Shatto	7,007 yards rushing; 6,684 yards receiving; 2,026 kick return yards
3	15,487	Chad Owens	137 yards rushing; 5,164 yards receiving; 10,186 kick return yards
4	10,232	Derrell Mitchell	130 yards rushing; 9,048 yards receiving; 1,054 kick return yards
5	9,380	Darrell K. Smith	107 yards rushing; 8,144 yards receiving; 1,129 kick return yards

Most combined yards, season

Rank	Yards	Name	Year	Breakdown
1	3,863	Chad Owens	2012	25 yards rushing; 1,328 yards receiving; 828 punt return yards; 1,588 kickoff return yards; 94 MFG return yards
2	3,840	Michael Clemons	1997	315 yards rushing; 1,085 yards receiving; 1,070 punt return yards; 1,117 kickoff return yards; 253 MFG return yards
3	3,345	Chad Owens	2011	14 yards rushing; 722 yards receiving; 754 punt return yards; 1,750 kickoff return yards; 105 MFG return yards
4	3,300	Michael Clemons	1990	519 yards rushing; 905 yards receiving; 1,045 punt return yards; 831 kickoff return yards
5	3,288	Chad Owens	2010	11 yards rushing; 576 yards receiving; 1,060 punt return yards; 1,216 kickoff return yards; 425 MFG return yards

Most combined yards, game

Rank	Yards	Name	Opponent	Date	Breakdown
1	402	Chad Owens	Hamilton Tiger-Cats	September 3, 2012	176 yards receiving; 226 kick return yards
2	401	Raghib Ismail	Ottawa Rough Riders	July 9, 1992	73 yards rushing; 51 yards receiving; 277 kick return yards
3	345	Bashir Levingston	Calgary Stampeders	August 24, 2005	345 kick return yards

== Interceptions ==
Most interceptions, career

Rank	Interceptions	Name	Years
1	47	Reggie Pleasant	1986–94
2	44	Adrion Smith	1996–05
3	41	Jim Rountree	1958–67
4	37	Carl Brazley	1983–92
5	30	Orlondo Steinauer	2001–07

Most interceptions, season

Rank	Interceptions	Name	Year
T-1	10	Bill McFarlane	1954
T-1	10	Jim Rountree	1960
T-3	9	Reggie Pleasant	1987
T-3	9	Reggie Pleasant	1989
T-3	9	Reggie Pleasant	1990
T-3	9	Ed Berry	1992

Most interceptions, game

Rank	Interceptions	Name	Opponent	Date
1	4	Art Johnson	Montreal Alouettes	October 7, 1961
T-2	3	Eight players	Multiple opponents	Multiple dates

Most interception return yards, career

Rank	Yards	Name	Years
1	781	Reggie Pleasant	1986–94
2	750	Adrion Smith	1996–05
3	744	Byron Parker	2005–09, 2010–11
4	710	Orlondo Steinauer	2001–07
5	590	Ed Berry	1988–92, 1996

Most interception return yards, season

Rank	Yards	Name	Year
1	348	Byron Parker	2006
2	238	Adrion Smith	2003
T-3	209	Bill McFarlane	1954
T-3	209	Cassius Vaughn	2017
5	206	Wynton McManis	2023

Most interception return yards, game

Rank	Yards	Name	Opponent	Date
1	170	Robertson Daniel	BC Lions	July 3, 2023
2	135	Byron Parker	Hamilton Tiger-Cats	September 9, 2006
T-3	115	Eric Harris	Montreal Alouettes	September 6, 1977
T-3	115	Cassius Vaughn	Calgary Stampeders	August 26, 2017
5	108	Antwaun Molden	Saskatchewan Roughriders	July 5, 2014

Longest interception return

Rank	Yards	Name	Opponent	Date
T-1	115	Eric Harris	Montreal Alouettes	September 6, 1977
T-1	115	Cassius Vaughn	Calgary Stampeders	August 26, 2017
3	108	Antwaun Molden	Saskatchewan Roughriders	July 5, 2014
4	100	A. J. Jefferson	Saskatchewan Roughriders	July 5, 2015
5	94	Don Wilson	Winnipeg Blue Bombers	August 6, 1992

== Tackles ==
- Note: Tackles were first recorded in 1987, but there was no differentiation between defensive and special teams tackles. Those categorical differences were added in 1991.

Most defensive tackles – career

Rank	Tackles	Name	Years
1	822	Mike O'Shea	1996–99, 2001–08
2	703	Kevin Eiben	2001–11
3	503	Don Moen	1987–94
4	447	Reggie Pleasant	1987–94
5	441	Orlondo Steinauer	2001–08

Most defensive tackles – season

Rank	Tackles	Name	Year
1	121	Calvin Tiggle	1994
2	117	Chris Gaines	1990
T-3	113	Reggie Pleasant	1991
T-3	113	Kevin Eiben	2005
5	110	Kevin Eiben	2004

Most defensive tackles – game

Rank	Tackles	Name	Opponent	Date
1	16	Robertson Daniel	Calgary Stampeders	August 4, 2023
2	14	Jeff Braswell	Hamilton Tiger-Cats	October 31, 1992
T-3	13	Maurice Miller	Edmonton Eskimos	July 23, 1998
T-3	13	Ian Wild	BC Lions	July 6, 2019
T-3	13	Adarius Pickett	Montreal Alouettes	September 15, 2023
T-3	13	Adarius Pickett	Edmonton Elks	September 19, 2026

Most special teams tackles – career

Rank	Tackles	Name	Years
1	136	Bryan Crawford	2005–11
2	124	Mike O'Shea	1996–99, 2001–08
3	97	Jeff Johnson	2002–13
4	83	Matt Black	2009–18
5	81	Kevin Eiben	2001–11

Most special teams tackles – season

Rank	Tackles	Name	Year
1	33	Kevin Eiben	2003
2	30	Mike O'Shea	1997
3	28	Ray Mariuz	2004
T-4	27	Bryan Crawford	2007
T-4	27	Llevi Noel	2017
T-4	27	Frank Beltre	2019

== Quarterback sacks ==
- Note: Sacks were first recorded in 1980.

Most sacks – career

Rank	Sacks	Player	Years
1	92	Rodney Harding	1985–94
2	51	Jonathan Brown	2004–09
3	44	Harold Hallman	1988–93
T-4	35.5	James Curry	1983–85
T-4	34.5	Don Moen	1982–93

Most sacks – season

Rank	Sacks	Player	Year
1	22	James Curry	1984
2	18	Rodney Harding	1994
3	15.5	Rick Mohr	1983
T-4	15	Harold Hallman	1989
T-4	15	Elfrid Payton	2001
6	14	Eric England	2003

Most sacks – game

Rank	Sacks	Player	Opponent / Date
1	5	Rodney Harding	vs. Edmonton Eskimos, September 25, 1988
2	4.5	James Curry	vs. Ottawa Rough Riders, August 31, 1984
T-3	4	James Curry	vs. Ottawa Rough Riders, August 5, 1984
T-3	4	Harold Hallman	vs. Hamilton Tiger-Cats, September 15, 1990
T-3	4	Swift Burch	vs. Hamilton Tiger-Cats, August 3, 1995
T-3	4	Lester Smith	vs. Winnipeg Blue Bombers, September 7, 1997
T-3	4	Jonathan Brown	vs. BC Lions, October 11, 2004

== Punt returns ==
Most punt return yards – career

Rank	Yards	Name	Years
1	6,025	Michael Clemons	1989–2000
2	4,007	Chad Owens	2010–15
3	2,921	Bashir Levingston	2002–07
4	2,752	Jan Carinci	1981–85
5	2,481	Janarion Grant	2024–26

Most punt return yards – season

Rank	Yards	Name	Year
1	1,216	Javon Leake	2023
2	1,070	Michael Clemons	1990
3	1,060	Chad Owens	2010
4	1,045	Michael Clemons	1990
5	989	Janarion Grant	2024

Most punt return yards – game

Rank	Yards	Name	Opponent	Date
1	186	Jimmy Cunningham	Calgary Stampeders	September 21, 1996
2	185	Paul Bennett	Hamilton Tiger-Cats	October 10, 1977
3	174	Michael Clemons	Hamilton Tiger-Cats	September 15, 1990
4	171	Javon Leake	Saskatchewan Roughriders	July 29, 2023
5	159	Arland Bruce III	Winnipeg Blue Bombers	October 10, 2008

Longest punt return – game

Rank	Yards	Name	Opponent	Date
T-1	109	Pernell Moore	Ottawa Rough Riders	July 20, 1988
T-1	109	Bashir Levingston	Calgary Stampeders	August 24, 2005
3	108	Jimmy Cunningham	Calgary Stampeders	September 30, 1995
4	100	Jimmy Cunningham	Winnipeg Blue Bombers	October 1, 1995

== Kickoff returns ==
Most kickoff return yards – career

Rank	Yards	Name	Years
1	6,349	Michael Clemons	1989–2000
2	5,376	Chad Owens	2010–15
3	3,356	Bashir Levingston	2002–07
4	3,087	Janarion Grant	2024–26
5	2,215	Dominique Dorsey	2007–09

Most kickoff return yards – season

Rank	Yards	Name	Year
1	1,750	Chad Owens	2011
2	1,588	Chad Owens	2012
3	1,257	Dominique Dorsey	2008
4	1,216	Chad Owens	2010
5	1,196	Chris Rainey	2019

Most kickoff return yards – game

Rank	Yards	Name	Opponent	Date
1	245	Chad Owens	BC Lions	September 2, 2011
2	225	Dominique Dorsey	Montreal Alouettes	September 7, 2008
3	224	Raghib Ismail	Ottawa Rough Riders	July 9, 1992
4	214	Terry Greer	Hamilton Tiger-Cats	July 25, 1981
5	191	Chad Owens	Calgary Stampeders	October 14, 2011

Longest kickoff return – game

Rank	Yards	Name	Opponent	Date
1	110	Ryan Christian	Montreal Alouettes	August 14, 2010
2	109	Terry Greer	Hamilton Tiger-Cats	July 25, 1981
3	103	Janarion Grant	Montreal Alouettes	July 11, 2024
T-4	97	Bashir Levingston	Hamilton Tiger-Cats	October 21, 2004
T-5	97	Dominique Dorsey	Winnipeg Blue Bombers	September 23, 2007

== Punting ==
Highest average punting yards – career (minimum 100 punts)

Rank	Average	Player	Years
1	49.4	John Haggerty	2022–26
2	46.8	Swayze Waters	2012–15
3	45.8	Noel Prefontaine	1998–2007, 2010–13
4	45.6	Boris Bede	2021–23
5	45.2	Zenon Andrusyshyn	1971–82

Highest average punting yards – season (minimum 90 punts)

Rank	Average	Player	Year
T-1	50.3	John Haggerty	2024
T-1	50.3	John Haggerty	2025
3	48.5	Hank Ilesic	1986
4	48.2	John Haggerty	2022
5	48.0	Dave Mann	1961

Highest average punting yards – game (minimum 8 punts)

Rank	Average	Player	Opponent / Date
1	58.9	John Haggerty	at Calgary Stampeders, August 4, 2024
2	56.9	Hank Ilesic	at Edmonton Eskimos, August 1, 1986
3	56.5	Dave Mann	vs. Saskatchewan Roughriders, September 10, 1961
T-4	54.4	Dave Mann	vs. Calgary Stampeders, September 20, 1967
T-4	54.4	Hank Ilesic	at Montreal Alouettes, July 4, 1986

Longest punt

Rank	Yards	Player	Opponent / Date
1	108	Zenon Andrusyshyn	vs. Edmonton Eskimos, October 23, 1977
2	102	Joe Krol	vs. Hamilton Tiger-Cats, September 11, 1948
3	102	Dave Mann	at Saskatchewan Roughriders, September 18, 1966
4	101	Dean Dorsey	at Winnipeg Blue Bombers, October 11, 1982
5	95	Joe Krol	at Hamilton Tiger-Cats, September 6, 1948

== Field goals ==
Most field goals, career

Rank	Field goals	Name	Years
1	337	Lance Chomyc	1985–93
2	263	Noel Prefontaine	1998–2007, 2010–13
3	224	Lirim Hajrullahu	2016–17, 2024–26
4	191	Zenon Andrusyshyn	1971–77, 1980–82
5	112	Mike Vanderjagt	1996–97, 2008

Most field goals, season

Rank	Field goals	Name	Year
1	57	Lirim Hajrullahu	2025
T-2	55	Lance Chomyc	1991
T-2	55	Lirim Hajrullahu	2024
T-4	48	Lance Chomyc	1988
T-4	48	Dan Giancola	1999

Most field goals, game

Rank	Field goals	Name	Opponent	Date
1	8	Lirim Hajrullahu	Montreal Alouettes	September 28, 2024
T-2	7	Lance Chomyc	Calgary Stampeders	September 30, 1988
T-2	7	Lance Chomyc	Ottawa Rough Riders	October 14, 1988
T-2	7	Noel Prefontaine	BC Lions	August 1, 2003
T-2	7	Justin Medlock	BC Lions	August 14, 2009

Highest field goal accuracy, career (minimum 75 attempts)

Rank	Percentage	Name	Years
1	85.8% (224/261)	Lirim Hajrullahu	2016–17, 2024–25
2	85.0% (108/127)	Boris Bede	2021–23
3	79.5% (101/127)	Swayze Waters	2012–15
4	74.7% (112/150)	Mike Vanderjagt	1996–97, 2008
5	74.1% (337/455)	Lance Chomyc	1985–93

Highest field goal accuracy, season (minimum 30 attempts)

Rank	Percentage	Name	Year
1	94.9% (37/39)	Boris Bede	2023
2	90.4% (47/52)	Swayze Waters	2014
3	90.2% (55/61)	Lirim Hajrullahu	2024
4	89.1% (57/64)	Lirim Hajrullahu	2025
5	88.1% (37/42)	Lirim Hajrullahu	2016

Longest field goal

Rank	Distance	Name	Opponent	Date
1	57	Zenon Andrusyshyn	Saskatchewan Roughriders	September 14, 1980
T-2	56	Boris Bede	Hamilton Tiger-Cats	August 26, 2022
T-2	56	Lirim Hajrullahu	Saskatchewan Roughriders	June 20, 2025
T-2	56	Lirim Hajrullahu	Calgary Stampeders	October 18, 2025
5	55	Lance Chomyc	Saskatchewan Roughriders	November 8, 1987

Most consecutive field goals

Rank	Field goals	Name	Dates
T-1	18	Swayze Waters	August 1, 2014 – October 4, 2014
T-1	18	Boris Bede	September 9, 2023 – October 28, 2023
T-1	18	Lirim Hajrullahu	September 19 – October 18, 2025
4	17	Boris Bede	October 22, 2021 – June 16, 2022
5	16	Noel Prefontaine	August 28, 2004 – October 16, 2004

== Playoff records ==
Note: Playoff statistics do not include statistics registered in Grey Cup games.

Most games played – playoff career

Rank	Games	Player	Earliest	Latest
1	21	D. "Red" Wilson	1922	1930
T-2	16	Les Ascott	1940	1952
T-2	16	Noel Prefontaine	1998	2012
T-4	15	Lee Staughton	1933	1941
T-4	15	Steve Levantis	1939	1947
T-4	15	Danny Nykoluk	1955	1971

Note: All playoff statistics below are from 1936 onwards.

Most points – playoff career

Rank	Points	Player
1	101	Ulysses Curtis
2	77	Lance Chomyc
3	68	Joe Krol
4	57	Dave Mann
5	42	Ulysses Curtis

Most points – single playoff season

Rank	Points	Player	Year
1	26	Lirim Hajrullahu	2024
T-2	24	Ulysses Curtis	1950
T-2	24	Ron Morris	1961
T-2	24	Dave Mann	1968
5	21	Lance Chomyc	1987

Most points – single playoff game

Rank	Points	Player	Game	Date / Opponent
1	24	Ron Morris	Division Semi-Final	at Ottawa Rough Riders, November 11, 1961
T-2	19	Lance Chomyc	Division Semi-Final	vs. Hamilton Tiger-Cats, November 15, 1987
T-2	19	Boris Bede	Division Final	vs. Hamilton Tiger-Cats, December 5, 2021
T-4	18	Ulysses Curtis	Division Final	vs. Toronto Balmy Beach Beachers, November 18, 1950
T-4	18	Robert Drummond	Division Final	vs. Montreal Alouettes, November 9, 1997
T-4	18	Joe Krol	Division Final	vs. Ottawa Trojans, November 22, 1947

Most touchdowns – single playoff season

Rank	Touchdowns	Player	Years
1	4	Ron Morris	1961
T-2	3	Al Bruno	1952
T-2	3	Billy Myers	1945

Most touchdowns – single playoff game

Rank	Touchdowns	Player	Date / Opponent
1	4	Ron Morris	vs. Ottawa Rough Riders, November 11, 1961

Most rushing touchdowns – single playoff season

Rank	Touchdowns	Player	Years
1	4	Ulysses Curtis	1950
T-2	3	Joe Krol	1947
T-2	3	Tobin Rote	1961
T-2	3	Robert Drummond	1997

Most rushing touchdowns – single playoff game

Most passing Yards – single playoff game

Rank	Yards	Player	Date / Opponent
1	454	Tom Dublinski	at Hamilton Tiger-Cats, November 12, 1955

Most pass completions – single playoff game

Rank	Completions	Player	Game	Date / Opponent
1	38	Kerwin Bell	Division Semi-Final	at Montreal Alouettes, November 8, 1998
2	30	Doug Flutie	Division Final	vs. Montreal Alouettes, November 17, 1996

Most passing touchdowns – playoff career

Rank	Touchdowns	Player	Years
1	9	Tobin Rote	1960-61
2	8	Nobby Wirkowski	1951-52

Most passing touchdowns – single playoff season

Rank	Touchdowns	Player	Year
1	7	Tom Dublinski	1955
T-2	6	Joe Krol	1945
T-2	6	Nobby Wirkowski	1952
T-2	6	Tobin Rote	1961

Most passing touchdowns – game

Rank	Field goals	Player	Date / Opponent
T-1	4	Joe Krol	at Ottawa Rough Riders, November 13, 1945
T-1	4	Tom Dublinski	at Montreal Alouettes, November 19, 1955, 2021
T-1	4	Tobin Rote	at Ottawa Rough Riders, November 11, 1961

Most receiving yards – single playoff game

Rank	Yards	Player	Date / Opponent
1	207	Chad Owens	at Montreal Alouettes, November 18, 2012
2	186	Terry Greer	vs. Ottawa Rough Riders, November 21, 1982
3	180	Derrell Mitchell	at Montreal Alouettes, November 8, 1998

Most receptions – single playoff game

Rank	Receptions	Player	Date / Opponent
1	16	Derrell Mitchell	at Montreal Alouettes, November 8, 1998
2	12	Arland Bruce III	at Montreal Alouettes, November 14, 2004
3	11	Chad Owens	at Montreal Alouettes, November 18, 2012
4	10	Cedric Minter	vs. Hamilton Tiger-Cats, November 20, 1983

Most tackles – single playoff season

Rank	Tackles	Player	Year
1	18	Keith Castello	1990
2	15	Darryl Ford	1990
T-3	13	Willie Pless	1987
T-3	13	Don Moen	1990
T-3	13	Lin-J Shell	2010
T-3	13	Robert McCune	2012

Most tackles – single playoff game

Rank	Tackles	Player	Date / Opponent
1	10	Keith Castello	vs. Ottawa, November 11, 1990

Most interceptions – career

- 47 – Reggie Pleasant (1986–94)

Most interceptions – season

- 10 – Bill McFarlane – 1954

Most interceptions – single playoff game

Rank	Interceptions	Player	Date / Opponent
1	3	Darrell Moir	vs. Hamilton Tiger-Cats, November 16, 1986

Most sacks – single playoff game

Rank	Sacks	Player	Date / Opponent
1	3.5	James Curry	vs. Hamilton Tiger-Cats, November 11, 1984

Most field goals – single playoff game

Rank	Field goals	Player	Date / Opponent
T-1	6	Lance Chomyc	vs. Hamilton Tiger-Cats, November 15, 1987
T-1	6	Boris Bede	vs. Hamilton Tiger-Cats, December 5, 2021

== Coaching records ==
For the full list of Toronto Argonauts coaching records, see List of Toronto Argonauts head coaches.
