= List of Canadian Football League players with 1,000 rushing yards in a season =

The following quarterbacks and running backs have totaled at least 1,000 rushing yards in a Canadian Football League (CFL) season.

- Gary Allen
- Kelvin Anderson
- John Avery
- Nub Beamer
- Roy Bell
- Eric Blount
- Cory Boyd
- Johnny Bright
- Blaise Bryant
- Ed Buchanan
- Willie Burden
- Wes Cates
- Lovell Coleman
- Jon Cornish
- Darren Davis
- Troy Davis
- Robert Drummond
- Robert Edwards
- Monroe Eley
- Jim Evenson
- Gill Fenerty
- Willie Fleming
- Jim Germany
- Cookie Gilchrist
- Tracy Ham
- Andrew Harris
- Lou Harris
- Mack Herron
- Gerry James
- Michael Jenkins
- Kerry Joseph
- Kenton Keith
- Larry Key
- Norman Kwong
- Leo Lewis
- Earl Lunsford
- Hugh McKinnis
- Martell Mallett
- Tim McCray
- Bob McNamara
- Jerome Messam
- William Miller
- Sean Millington
- Troy Mills
- Robert Mimbs
- Johnny Musso
- Doyle Orange
- Martin Patton
- Cory Philpot
- Mike Pringle
- Dave Raimey
- Josh Ranek
- Willard Reaves
- George Reed
- Fred Reid
- Joffrey Reynolds
- Mike Richardson
- Charles Roberts
- Jamal Robertson
- Mike Saunders
- Kory Sheets
- Charlie Shepard
- Chad Simpson
- Joe Smith
- Tony Stewart
- Mike Strickland
- Tyrell Sutton
- Bob Swift
- James Sykes
- Bill Symons
- Reggie Taylor
- Jim Thomas
- Jon Volpe
- Antonio Warren
- Jim Washington
- Howard Waugh
- Brandon Whitaker
- Arkee Whitlock
- Ronald Williams
