= Don Moen (Canadian football) =

Canadian gridiron football player (born 1960)

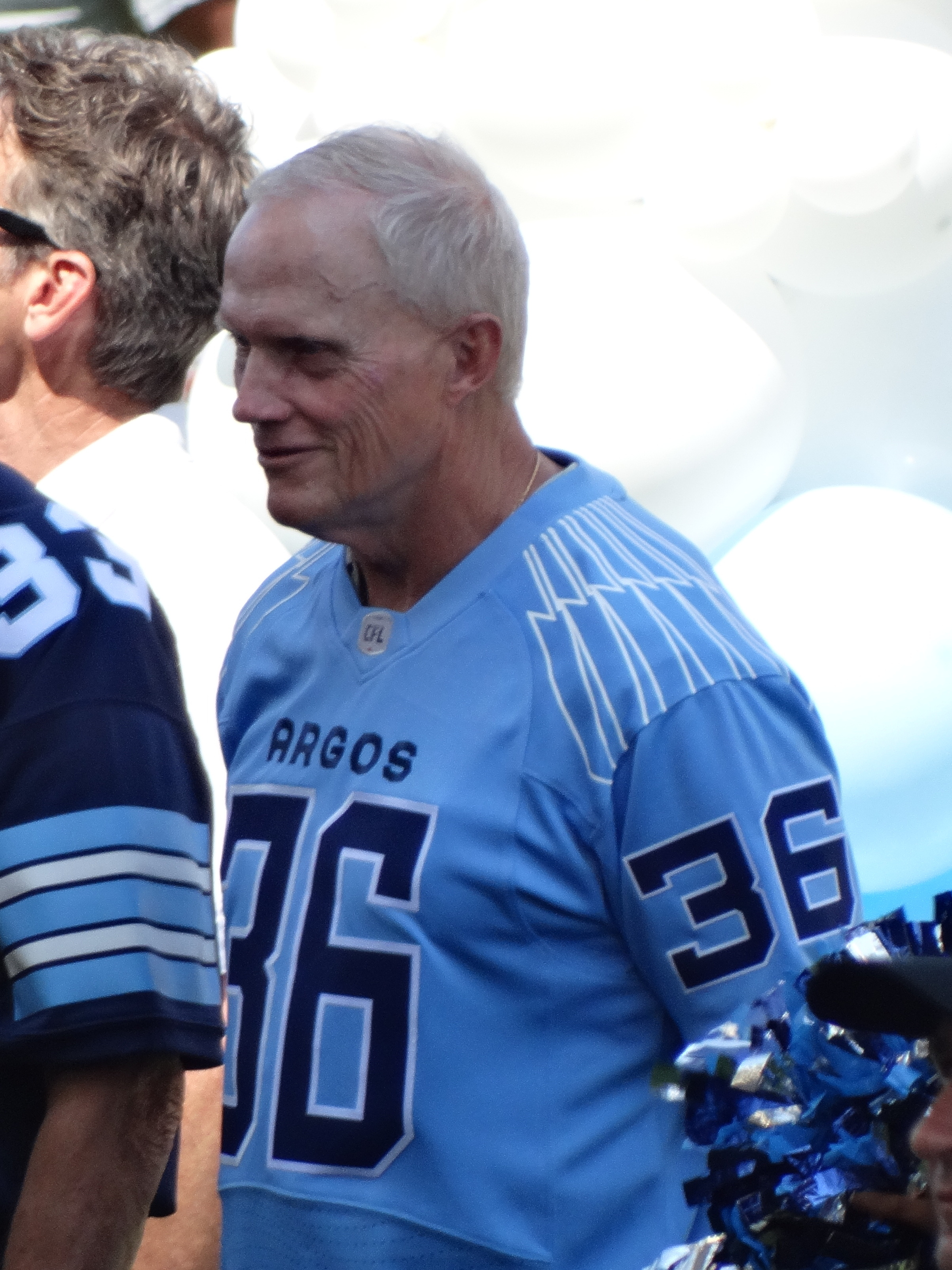
- Moen in 2025

No. 36
- Position: Linebacker

Personal information
- Born: April 29, 1960 (age 66); Swift Current, Saskatchewan, Canada

Career information
- University: British Columbia
- CFL draft: 1982: 2nd round, 14th overall pick

Career history
- 1982–1994: Toronto Argonauts

Awards and highlights
- 2× Grey Cup champion (1983, 1991); CFL East All-Star (1988); Toronto Argonauts record, career games played (222)

Don Moen (born April 29, 1960) is a Canadian former professional football linebacker who played thirteen seasons in the Canadian Football League (CFL) for the Toronto Argonauts. He holds the franchise record for most games played in a career as an Argonaut with 222. During Moen's tenure in the CFL he won two Grey Cup championships with Toronto in 1983 and 1991.

== University career ==
Moen played CIAU football for the UBC Thunderbirds.

== Professional career ==
Moen was drafted in the second round, with the 14th pick (32nd overall, if including territorial exemptions) in the 1982 CFL draft by the BC Lions. He then joined the Toronto Argonauts in 1982 and won his first Grey Cup championship in 1983. He was named an East All-Star in 1988 where he had 57 tackles, three sacks, two interceptions, and two fumble recoveries (including one returned for a touchdown). Moen won his second Grey Cup championship in 1991 when the Argonauts defeated the Calgary Stampeders.

Moen played in 222 regular season games, which is the most in Toronto Argonauts' history. He also played in a franchise record 198 consecutive games. In his career, he recorded 503 defensive tackles, 35.5 sacks, 11 interceptions, and 15 fumble recoveries. In 2007, Moen was made a member of the "All-time Argos" team, joining Argo greats such as Mike O'Shea, Doug Flutie and Mike Clemons.
