= Lirim Hajrullahu =

Kosovo-born Canadian gridiron football player (born 1990)

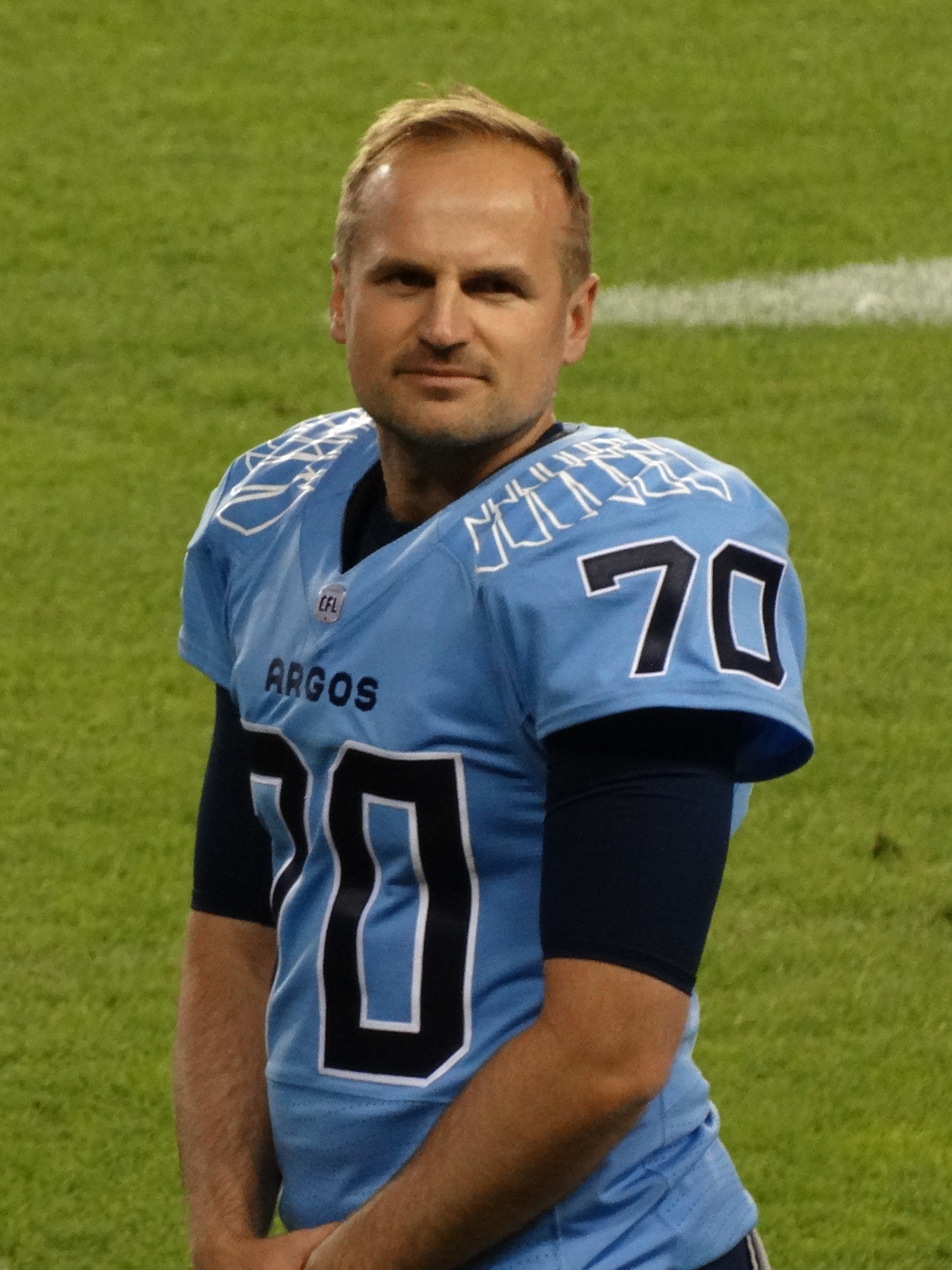
- Hajrullahu with the Toronto Argonauts in 2024

No. 70 – Toronto Argonauts
- Position: Placekicker

Personal information
- Born: April 24, 1990 (age 36); Gjilan, SFR Yugoslavia (today Kosovo)
- Listed height: 5 ft 11 in (1.80 m)
- Listed weight: 205 lb (93 kg)

Career information
- High school: Governor Simcoe (St. Catharines, Ontario, Canada)
- University: Western Ontario
- NFL draft: 2014: undrafted

Career history
- Winnipeg Blue Bombers (2014–2015); Toronto Argonauts (2016–2017); Hamilton Tiger-Cats (2018–2019); Los Angeles Rams (2020)*; Carolina Panthers (2020–2021)*; Dallas Cowboys (2021); Washington Football Team (2021)*; Carolina Panthers (2021); Dallas Cowboys (2022)*; Philadelphia Stars (2023); Toronto Argonauts (2024–present)
- * Offseason or practice squad member only

Awards and highlights
- 2× Grey Cup champion (2017, 2024); CFL All-Star (2025); 4× CFL East All-Star (2016, 2019, 2024, 2025); CFL West Most Outstanding Special Teams (2014); CFL East Most Outstanding Special Teams (2025)

Career NFL statistics
- Field goals made: 4
- Field goal attempts: 5
- Longest field goal: 35
- Extra point attempts: 8
- Extra points made: 8
- Field goal %: 80.0
- Stats at Pro Football Reference

Career CFL statistics as of 2025
- Field goals: 351
- Field goal attempts: 412
- Longest field goal: 56
- Punts: 657
- Punt average: 44.0
- Stats at CFL.ca

Lirim Hajrullahu (/ˈhaɪruːˌlɑːhuː/ HIGH-roo-LAH-hoo; born April 24, 1990) is a Kosovar-Canadian professional football placekicker for the Toronto Argonauts of the Canadian Football League (CFL). He is a two-time Grey Cup champion after winning with the Argonauts in 2017 and 2024, was named a CFL All-Star in 2025, and is a four-time CFL East Division All-Star (2016, 2019, 2024, 2025). Hajrullahu played CIS football at Western Ontario and attended Governor Simcoe Secondary School in St. Catharines, Ontario.

== Early life ==
Lirim Hajrullahu was born in Gjilan to father Nijazi Hajrullahu and mother Tevide. He is of Kosovo Albanian descent. His father had been a professor at the University of Sarajevo. Lirim is a middle child, and has an older sister Lume and a younger sister Linda.

As a child growing up in Gjilan, he played soccer during and after school, which is where he learned to kick. He went to Governor Simcoe Secondary School in St. Catharines and graduated in 2009.

On May 27, 1999, the family immigrated to Canada. They landed in CFB Trenton and spent two weeks at the base before moving to Kingston, Ontario where they spent two months of their summer. They received classes on the English language, and Hajrullahu received a bicycle through donations.

Due to the lack of soccer infrastructure in his town, he also picked up playing basketball and volleyball. Hajrullahu credits sports as "a gateway to communicate with other Canadians" which helped him learn English. He had friends trying out for the football team in grade 9, while Hajrullahu took up soccer. In the school hallways, he caught the attention of football coach D'Arcy McCardle who "was struck by the student's big frame and thick legs." McCardle approached him to play on the football team but Harjullahu felt the sport was too dangerous and brushed him off. After a year of insistence, McCardle told him to try out on the first day of school in grade 10 and if Hajrullahu didn't like it then he wouldn't bother him again. "I went out for one practice and I fell in love with the game," explained Hajrullahu. He played right tackle when he was in grade 11, and played as a linebacker, offensive lineman and kicker in grade 12.

Hajrullahu attended the University of Western Ontario's School of Kinesiology, receiving his bachelor's degree in sports management in 2013 and his master's degree in management and leadership in 2015. He attended Niagara University – Ontario where he received his MBA in finance in 2017.

== University career ==
=== Western Mustangs ===
Hajrullahu's secondary school football coach D'Arcy McCardle mentioned him to Western Mustangs football coach Greg Marshall during the recruiting process when the two discussed kickers. Hajrullahu received scholarship opportunities from across Canada and narrowed his choice down between Western and Queen's University, choosing the former.

He credits his kicking talents from persistently kicking the ball, stating "In university, I'd kick from after school until after you couldn't see the light anymore, three or four hours. As a young punter and kicker, you have to develop power and muscle memory."

=== National team ===
Lirim Hajrullahu
Medal record

Men's American football

Representing Canada

World Championship
| Silver medal – second place | 2011 Austria | Team competition |

Junior World Championship
| Silver medal – second place | 2009 Ohio | Team competition |

In 2009, Hajrullahu was selected as part of the Canada national junior football team, which competed at the 2009 IFAF Junior World Championship in Canton, Ohio. Canada beat New Zealand on June 27 to advance to the semi-finals, and beat Japan on July 1 to reach the finals. Canada secured the silver medal after losing to the United States on July 5.

In 2011, Hajrullahu was selected as part of the Canada national football team, which competed at the 2011 IFAF World Championship in Austria. Canada won the Group 2 round-robin stage after beating France on July 9, Austria on July 11, and Japan on July 13 to advance to the finals. Canada secured the silver medal after losing to the United States on July 16.

== Professional career ==
=== Winnipeg Blue Bombers ===
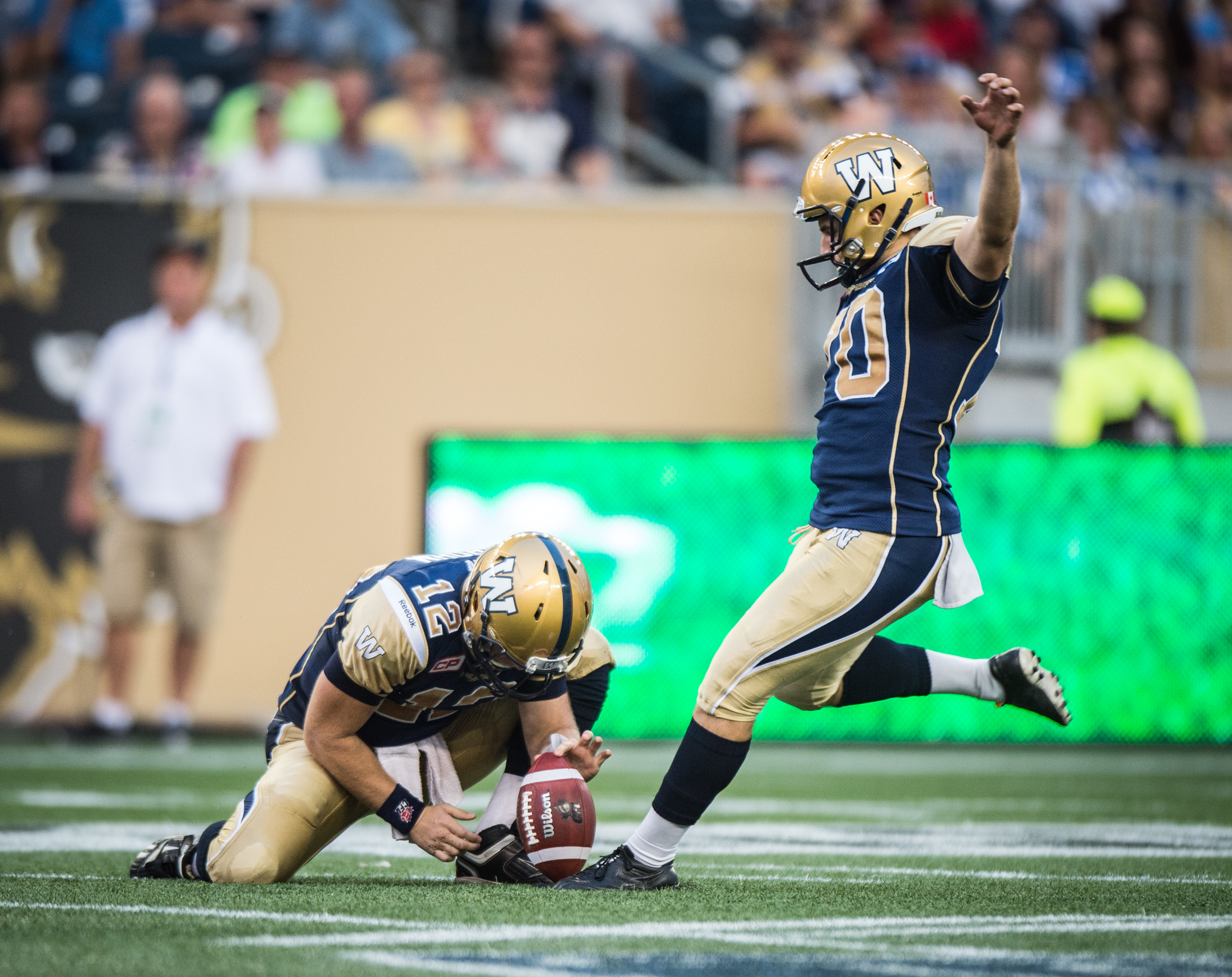
Hajrullahu (right) with the Blue Bombers in 2015

On January 17, 2014, Hajrullahu was signed by the Winnipeg Blue Bombers of the Canadian Football League (CFL). On November 5, Hajrullahu was announced as the winner of the Winnipeg Blue Bomber's Most Outstanding Canadian, Most Outstanding Special Teams, and Most Outstanding Rookie awards. On November 13, he won the West Division's Most Outstanding Special Teams Award.

=== Toronto Argonauts (first stint) ===
Hajrullahu became a free agent on February 9, 2016, and signed with the Toronto Argonauts that same day.

In the 2016 season, he became the first player to score points in the first regular-season CFL game at BMO Field on June 23. He scored the first CFL points for both a visiting team and the Argonauts. He conceded a safety to the Hamilton Tiger-Cats, then later kicked a field goal for the Argos. Hamilton won the game, 40–23. On November 2, Hajrullahu was announced as the winner of the Toronto Argonauts' Most Outstanding Canadian and Most Outstanding Special Teams awards. On November 9, Hajrullahu was named as part of the East Division's All-Star team.

On January 11, 2017, Hajrullahu signed a contract extension with the team for the 2017 season. On November 26, Hajrullahu kicked the game-winning field goal to secure a win in the 105th Grey Cup for Toronto at TD Place Stadium. He had gone into the championship game mourning the death of his younger cousin who had died in a car crash in Kosovo in the days leading up to Hajrullahu's big game.

=== Hamilton Tiger-Cats ===
On February 13, 2018, Hajrullahu signed a contract with the Hamilton Tiger-Cats.

During the 2018 season, Hajrullahu converted 85% of his field goals, while the Ti-Cats advanced in the playoffs to the East final before being eliminated. Despite receiving NFL interest, including a workout with the Seattle Seahawks, Hajrullahu took his time in choosing a team for 2019; he eventually signed a 2-year contract to return to Hamilton after six weeks of free agency.

On November 6, 2019, Hajrullahu was named as part of the East Division's All-Star team. While he would have been in the option year of his contract following the 2019 season, the NFL did not allow its teams to sign CFL players entering these option years. After there was still no resolution to this issue, the Tiger-Cats released Hajrullahu on January 9, 2020, to allow him to pursue NFL opportunities.

=== Los Angeles Rams ===
On April 13, 2020, Hajrullahu signed a contract with the Los Angeles Rams of the National Football League (NFL). It was exactly a day short of 21 years, when on April 14, 1999, Hajrullahu and his family were forced out of their village due to the Kosovo War. Hajrullahu received interest from five teams at the NFL combine in March in Arizona, which he had been attending every year since his days playing for Winnipeg.

He was waived on September 4, 2020, after losing the kicker job to rookie Sam Sloman. Although there was no preseason and training camp practices were closed to the general public because of the COVID-19 pandemic, it was reported that he "was the victim of NFL politics", despite Hajrullahu having been the best statistical kicker during practices, with Sloman sharing the same alma mater (Miami University), as Rams head coach Sean McVay.

=== The Spring League (first stint) ===
In November 2020, Hajrullahu signed with the Generals of The Spring League (TSL) and played in their inaugural fall season.

=== Carolina Panthers (first stint) ===
On December 9, 2020, Hajrullahu was signed to the Carolina Panthers' practice squad, but was released six days later due to a work visa problem. He signed a reserve/future contract with the Panthers on January 4, 2021. He was waived on March 22.

=== The Spring League (second stint) ===
Hajrullahu returned to the Generals for The Spring League's 2021 season. On May 8, he went 5-for-5 in field goals in the first game, including the longest field goal of his career at 59 yards. It was the TSL's television debut on Fox, and Hajrullahu set a new league record for longest field goal, tied the single-game record for fields goals, and was named the South Division Player of the Week.

=== Dallas Cowboys (first stint) ===
On August 18, 2021, Hajrullahu signed with the Dallas Cowboys after the team released punter and emergency kicker Hunter Niswander, who had been filling in at placekicker for an injured Greg Zuerlein. He spent five days in training camp and was released on August 24, 2021. He was re-signed to the practice squad on September 14. He was released from the practice squad on September 21.

He was re-signed on November 10. In Week 10, he replaced Zuerlein, after he tested positive for COVID-19, making all five of his extra points and did not attempt a single field goal against the Atlanta Falcons. He was released on November 23.

=== Washington Football Team ===
On December 11, 2021, Hajrullahu was signed to the Washington Football Team's practice squad.

=== Carolina Panthers (second stint) ===
On December 22, 2021, following the injury of Zane Gonzalez in pre-game warmups in Week 15, the Panthers signed Hajrullahu off Washington's practice squad. He played in the last 3 games of the season, making 4 of 5 field goal attempts and 3 of 3 extra point attempts. He was waived on May 4, 2022.

=== Dallas Cowboys (second stint) ===
On July 1, 2022, he was signed by the Cowboys to compete for the starting job with rookie Jonathan Garibay. On August 9, 2022, Garibay was waived and the Cowboys signed free agent Brett Maher to compete with Hajrullahu. On August 23, 2022, he was released after losing the kicking battle to Maher.

=== Philadelphia Stars ===
Hajrullahu signed with the Philadelphia Stars of the United States Football League (USFL) on May 17, 2023. The Stars folded when the XFL and USFL merged to create the United Football League (UFL).

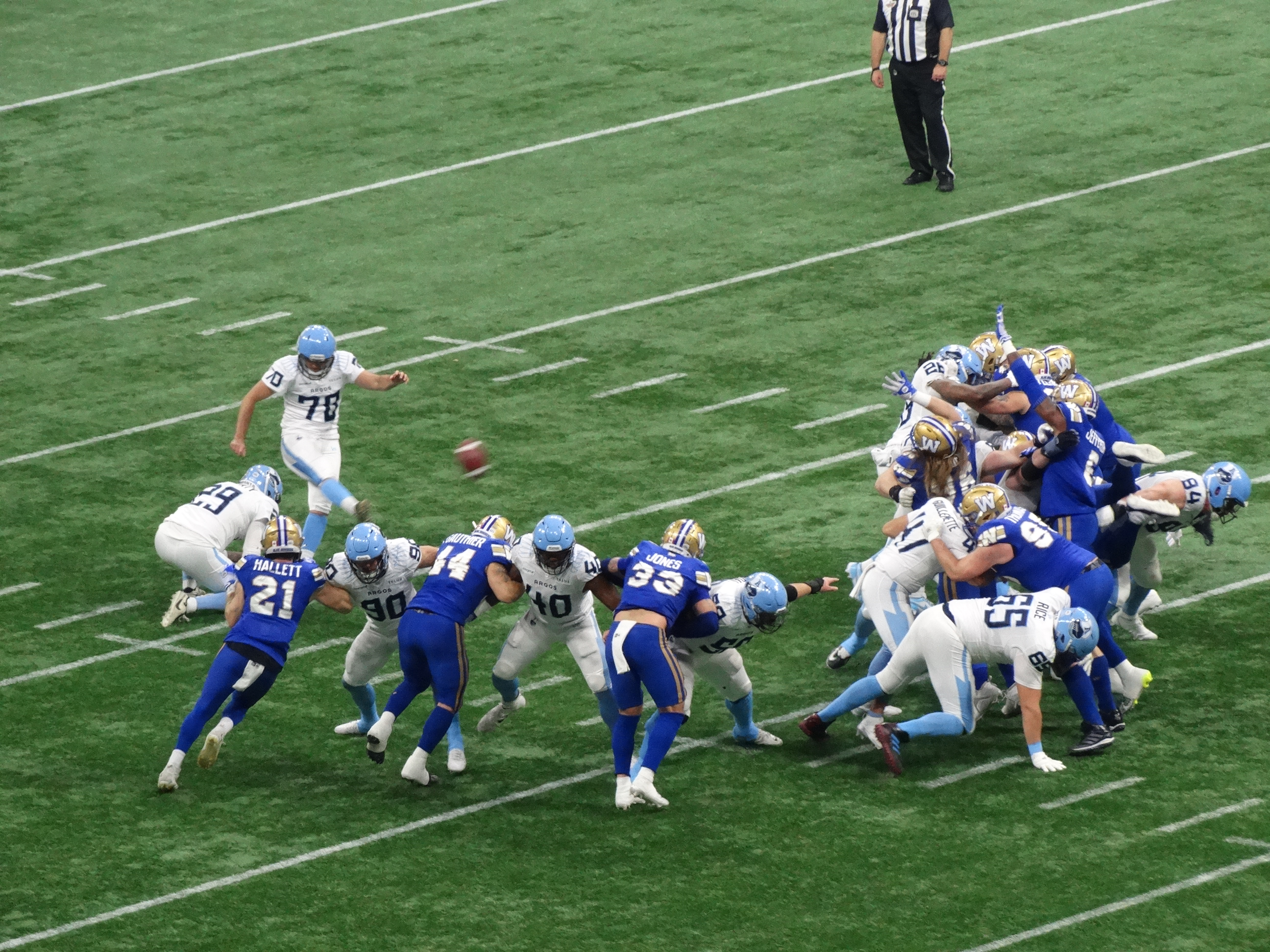
Hajrullahu kicks a field goal in the 111th Grey Cup.

=== Toronto Argonauts (second stint) ===
On February 5, 2024, it was announced that Hajrullahu had signed with the Argonauts, replacing the incumbent, Boris Bede, who was released the same day. He notably kicked eight field goals in a game against the Montreal Alouettes on September 8, 2024, which tied a league record with three other players. Hajrullahu played in all 18 regular season games where he was successful on 55 of 61 field goal attempts and 35 of 37 convert attempts. He also tied the Argonauts' franchise record for field goals in a season with Lance Chomyc and also had the third-best single season success rate in Argonauts' history at 90.2%. He also played in all three post-season games, including the 111th Grey Cup where he made all four field goal attempts and all four convert attempts in the Argonauts' 41–24 victory over the Winnipeg Blue Bombers.

In the 2025 season, Hajrullahu had one of the best seasons in team and league history. On June 20, 2025, he kicked the second-longest field goal in team history, which he did again on October 18, 2025. On September 26, 2025, he matched a CFL record when he kicked three field goals of at least 50 yards in one game. In the last game of the season, he kicked his 57th field goal of the year, which was a franchise record, and the fifth most in league history. That same field goal was his 12th of the season to be at least 50 yards, which set a new CFL single-season record. His 208 points was the second most in team history. He finished the year having connected on 57 of 64 field goal attempts and was 32 of 33 on convert attempts. At the end of the year, he was named a CFL All-Star for the first time in his career and was named the East Division nominee for the CFL's Most Outstanding Special Teams Player

== Personal life ==
Hajrullahu is married to Deniza Januzi. The couple met while attending university, and married in 2017. Deniza emigrated to Canada from Kosovo escaping war under similar circumstances as her husband. She graduated from the Ivey School of Business at the University of Western Ontario, receiving her undergraduate degree in Honours Business Administration and afterwards a Master of Business Administration (MBA) degree from the Lazaridis School of Business and Economics at Laurier University.
