= Javon Leake =

American gridiron football player (born 1998)

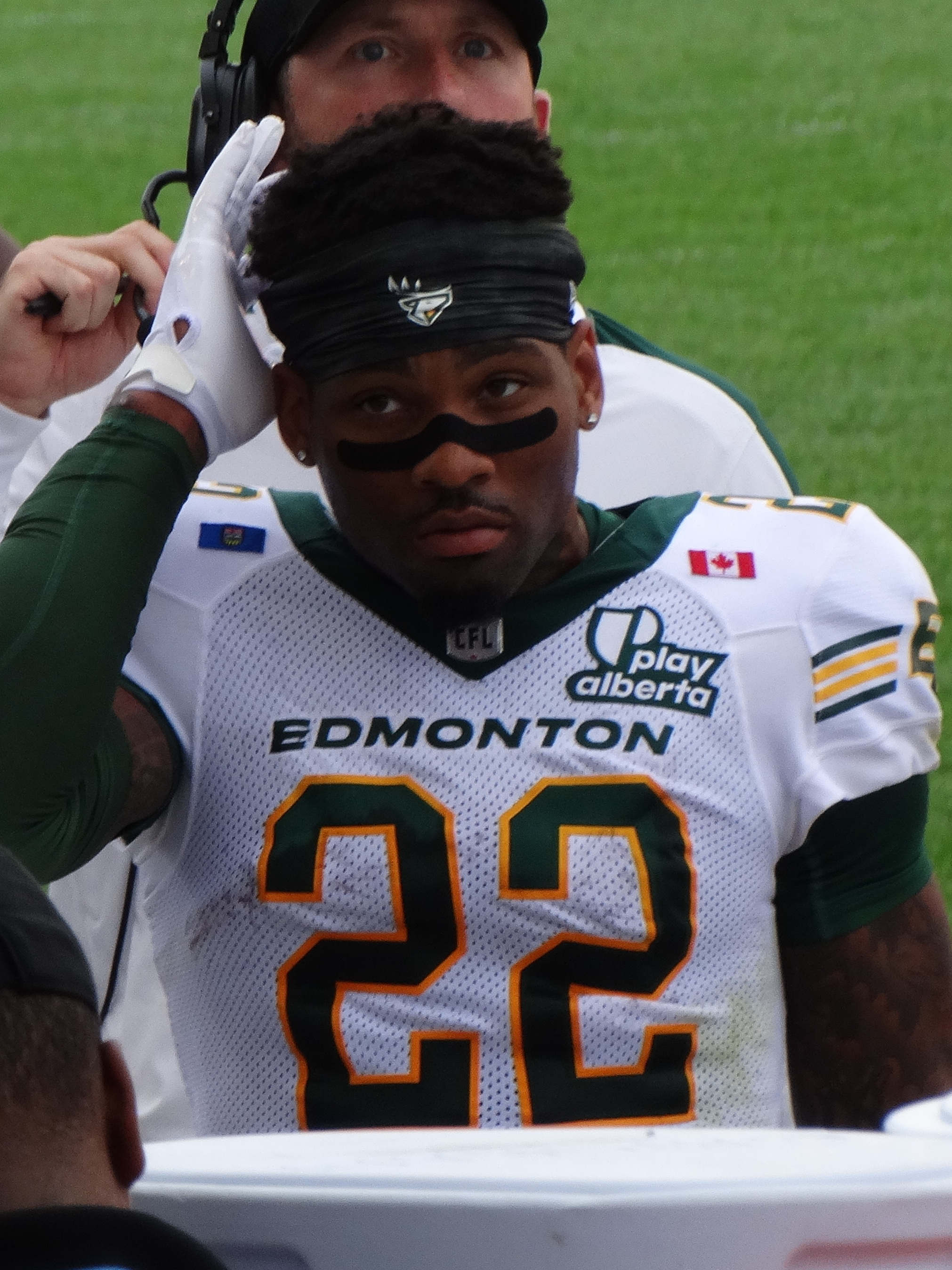
- Leake with the Edmonton Elks in 2025

No. 22 – Edmonton Elks
- Position: Running back
- Roster status: 6-game injured list
- CFL status: American

Personal information
- Born: August 1, 1998 (age 28); Bronx, New York, U.S.
- Listed height: 6 ft 0 in (1.83 m)
- Listed weight: 206 lb (93 kg)

Career information
- High school: Walter H. Page (Greensboro, North Carolina)
- College: Maryland
- NFL draft: 2020: undrafted

Career history
- New York Giants (2020)*; Washington Football Team (2020); Detroit Lions (2021)*; Toronto Argonauts (2022–2023); Edmonton Elks (2024–present)
- * Offseason or practice squad member only

Awards and highlights
- 2× Grey Cup champion (2022, 2026); John Agro Special Teams Award (2023); CFL All-Star (2023); CFL East All-Star (2023); Big Ten Return Specialist of the Year (2019); First-team All-Big Ten (2019)
- Stats at Pro Football Reference
- Stats at CFL.ca

Javon Leake (born August 1, 1998) is an American professional football running back and return specialist for the Edmonton Elks of the Canadian Football League (CFL). He has also been a member of the New York Giants, Washington Commanders and Detroit Lions of the National Football League (NFL), and the Toronto Argonauts of the CFL. He played college football for the Maryland Terrapins.

== Early life ==
Leake was born in The Bronx, New York and moved to Greensboro, North Carolina while in middle school and attended Walter Hines Page Senior High School. He became the Pirates' starting running back as a sophomore and rushed for 456 yards and five touchdowns. He was named first-team All-Area by the Greensboro News & Record after rushing 277 times for 2,048 yards and 30 touchdowns while gaining 356 yards and scoring four touchdowns on 21 receptions as a junior. As a senior, Leake gained 1,679 yards and scored 29 touchdowns on 216 carries despite missing time due to an ankle injury and was again named first-team All-Area and first-team All-State by USA Today. Rated a three-star recruit, Leake committed to play college football at Maryland over offers from Louisville, Nebraska, North Carolina, South Carolina, Tennessee and Virginia Tech.

== College career ==
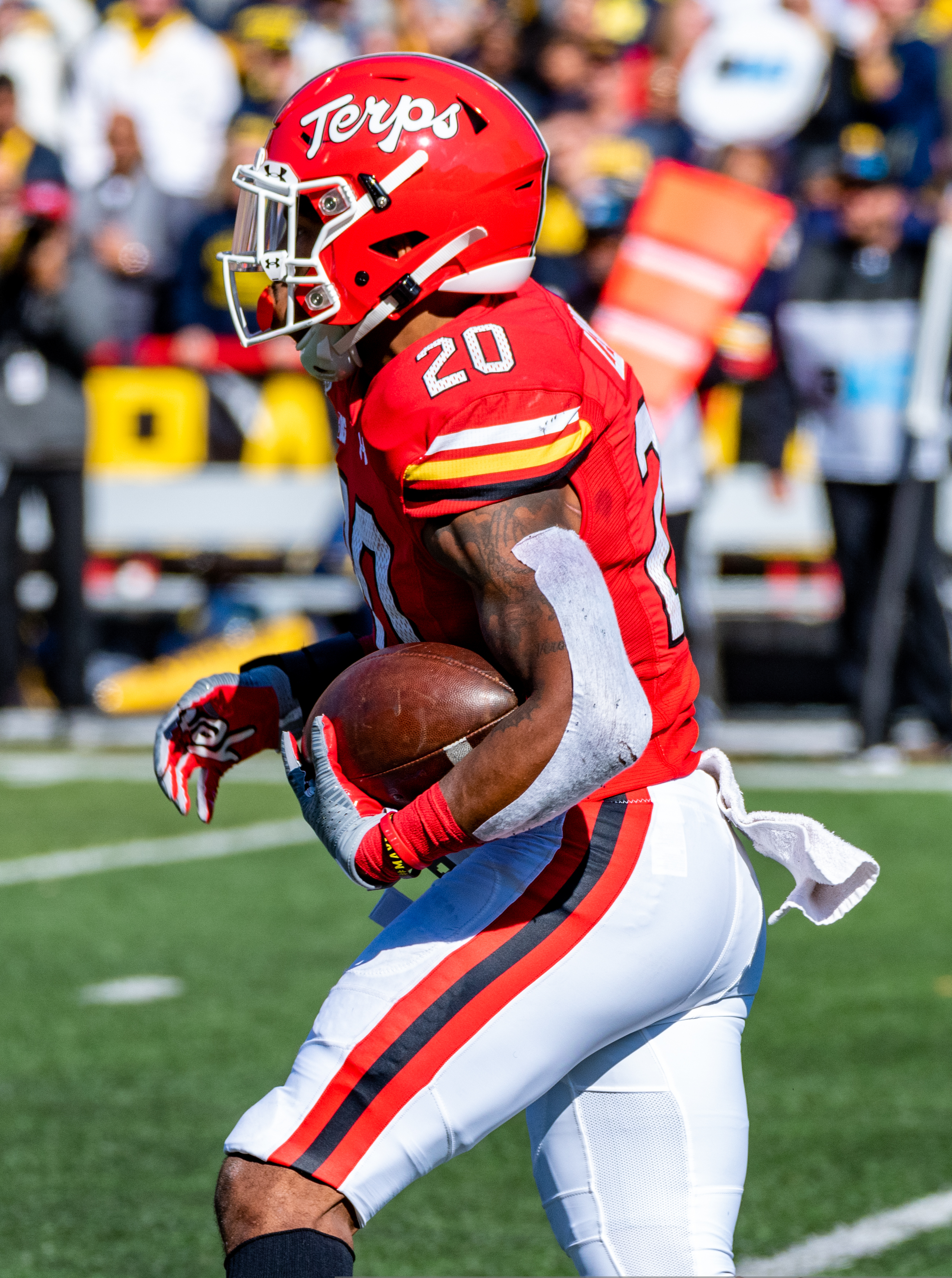
Leake with Maryland in 2019

Leake served as a kick returner and backup running back as a true freshman, rushing nine times for 99 yards and two touchdowns and returning 13 kicks for 274 yards. He rushed 34 times for 309 yards and a team-leading seven rushing touchdowns and lead the team with 409 kickoff return yards and one kick returned for a touchdown during his sophomore year. Leake became the first player in Big Ten Conference history to be named the Offensive and Special Teams Player of the Week for the same game after he rushed for 140 yards and three touchdowns and returned a kick 97 yards for a fourth score against Illinois.

Leake had an expanded role on offense as a junior, sharing primary running back duties with Anthony McFarland Jr., and rushed 102 times for 736 yards and eight touchdowns while also leading the Big Ten and finishing third in the nation with 804 kickoff return yards on 30 returns with two touchdowns and was named first-team All-Big Ten as a return specialist and the Rodgers-Dwight Return Specialist of the Year. He was named the Big Ten Special Teams Player of the Week two times after returning a kick 100 yards for a touchdown against Rutgers on October 4, 2019 and for a 97-yard return touchdown against Michigan on November 4, 2019. Following the end of the season Leake announced that he would be forgoing his final year of eligibility to enter the 2020 NFL draft.

== Professional career ==
Pre-draft measurables
Height	Weight	Arm length	Hand span	Wingspan	40-yard dash	10-yard split	20-yard split	Vertical jump	Broad jump
6 ft 0 1/8 in (1.83 m)	215 lb (98 kg)	31 1/2 in (0.80 m)	9 5/8 in (0.24 m)	6 ft 3 3/4 in (1.92 m)	4.65 s	1.62 s	2.75 s	34.0 in (0.86 m)	10 ft 5 in (3.18 m)
All values from NFL Combine

=== New York Giants ===
Leake signed with the New York Giants as an undrafted free agent on April 25, 2020, but was waived on August 29, 2020.

=== Washington Football Team ===
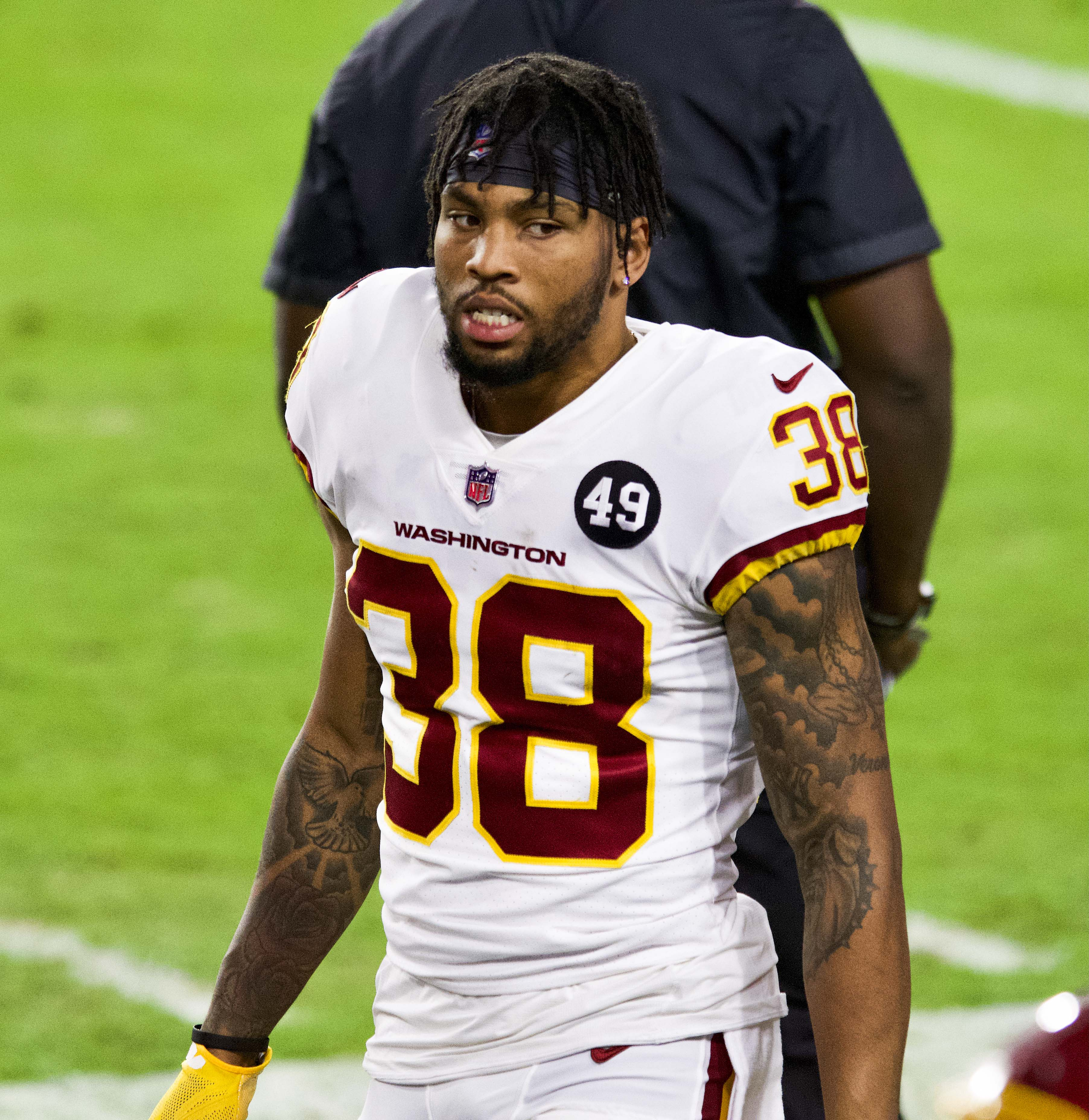
Leake with the Washington Football Team in 2020

Leake signed with the practice squad of the Washington Football Team on November 19, 2020. He was placed on the practice squad/COVID-19 list by the team on November 23, and restored to the practice squad on December 2. He was elevated to the active roster on December 12 for the team's week 14 game against the San Francisco 49ers, and reverted to the practice squad after the game. He was released on December 31, 2020, but rejoined their practice squad on January 7, 2021. Leake signed a reserve/futures contract with Washington on January 11, 2021, and was waived on April 9, 2021.

=== Detroit Lions ===
On August 11, 2021, Leake signed with the Detroit Lions. He was waived on August 23, 2021.

=== Toronto Argonauts ===
On April 26, 2022, it was announced that Leake had signed with the Toronto Argonauts. He played in his first CFL game in the team's season opener on June 16, 2022, against the Montreal Alouettes where he was used primarily as a kick returner. In 2023, Leake had a dominant season as he finished with 1,216 punt return yards, the third-most in CFL history and the most in Toronto franchise history. He also had four punt return touchdowns, which was one shy of the league record, but set a new Argonauts franchise record. He was named both a Divisional and CFL All-Star at the end of the year.

=== Edmonton Elks ===
On February 13, 2024, Leake signed with the Edmonton Elks. On December 16, he signed a two-year extension with the Elks.
