= Antwaun Molden =

American gridiron football player (born 1985)

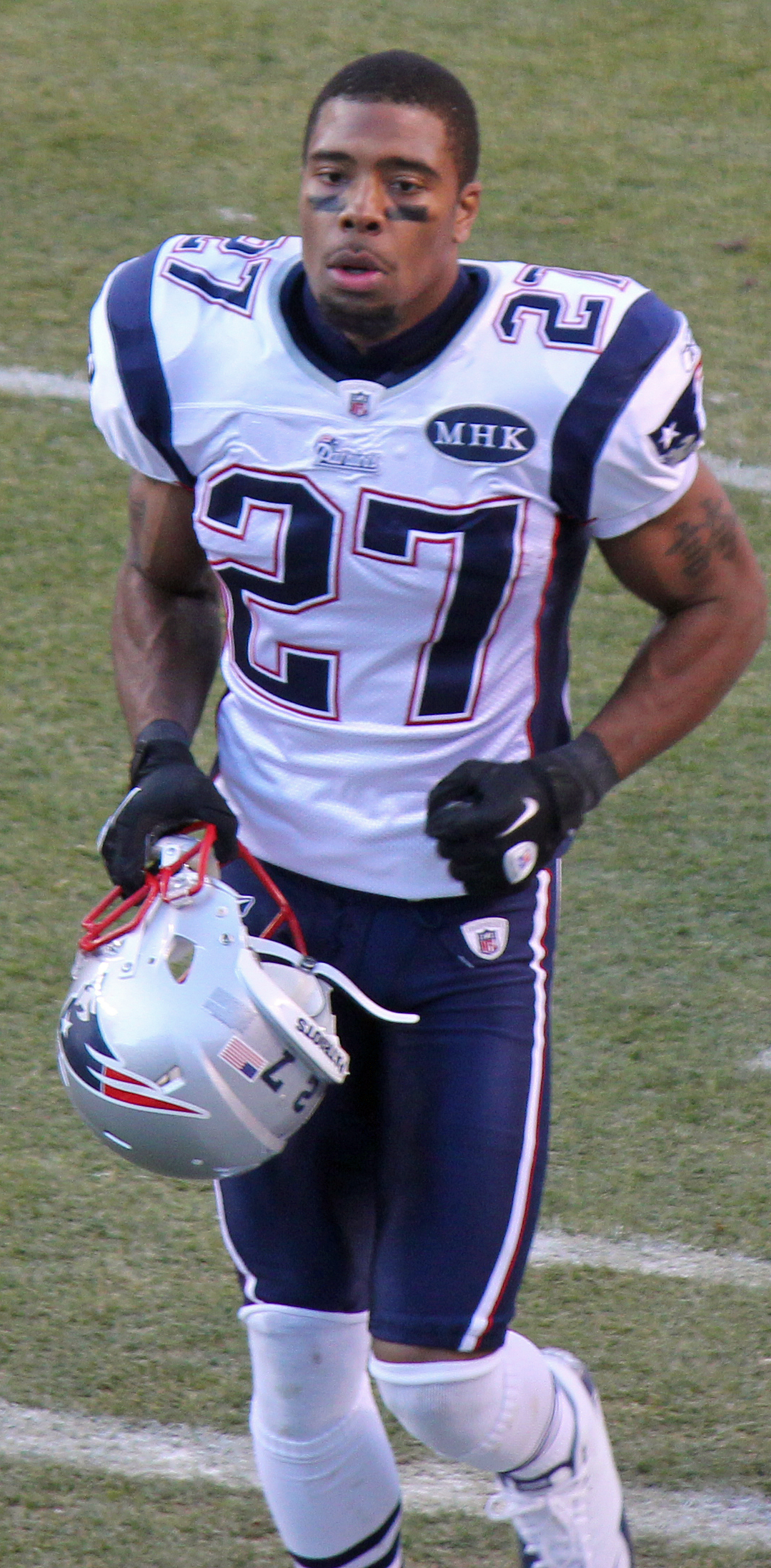
- Molden with the New England Patriots in 2011

No. 28, 36, 27, 24
- Position: Cornerback

Personal information
- Born: January 23, 1985 (age 41); Warren, Ohio, U.S.
- Listed height: 6 ft 1 in (1.85 m)
- Listed weight: 198 lb (90 kg)

Career information
- High school: Glenville (Cleveland, Ohio)
- College: Eastern Kentucky
- NFL draft: 2008: 3rd round, 79th overall pick

Career history
- Houston Texans (2008–2010); New England Patriots (2011); New York Giants (2012)*; Jacksonville Jaguars (2012); Toronto Argonauts (2014)
- * Offseason or practice squad member only

Awards and highlights
- Third-team All-American (2007); First-team All-OVC (2007)

Career NFL statistics
- Total tackles: 65
- Pass deflections: 3
- Interceptions: 2
- Stats at Pro Football Reference

Antwaun Molden (born January 23, 1985) is an American former professional football player who was a cornerback in the National Football League (NFL). He was selected by the Houston Texans in the third round of the 2008 NFL draft. He played college football for the Eastern Kentucky Colonels.

== Early life ==
Molden was born in Warren, Ohio. He attended Eastern Kentucky University, where he played for the Eastern Kentucky Colonels football team from 2004 to 2007.

== Professional career ==
Pre-draft measurables
Height	Weight	Arm length	Hand span	40-yard dash	10-yard split	20-yard split	20-yard shuttle	Three-cone drill	Vertical jump	Broad jump	Bench press
6 ft 0 3/4 in (1.85 m)	198 lb (90 kg)	32 1/8 in (0.82 m)	10 in (0.25 m)	4.39 s	1.50 s	2.55 s	4.14 s	6.85 s	37.5 in (0.95 m)	10 ft 9 in (3.28 m)	23 reps
All values from NFL Combine

=== Houston Texans ===
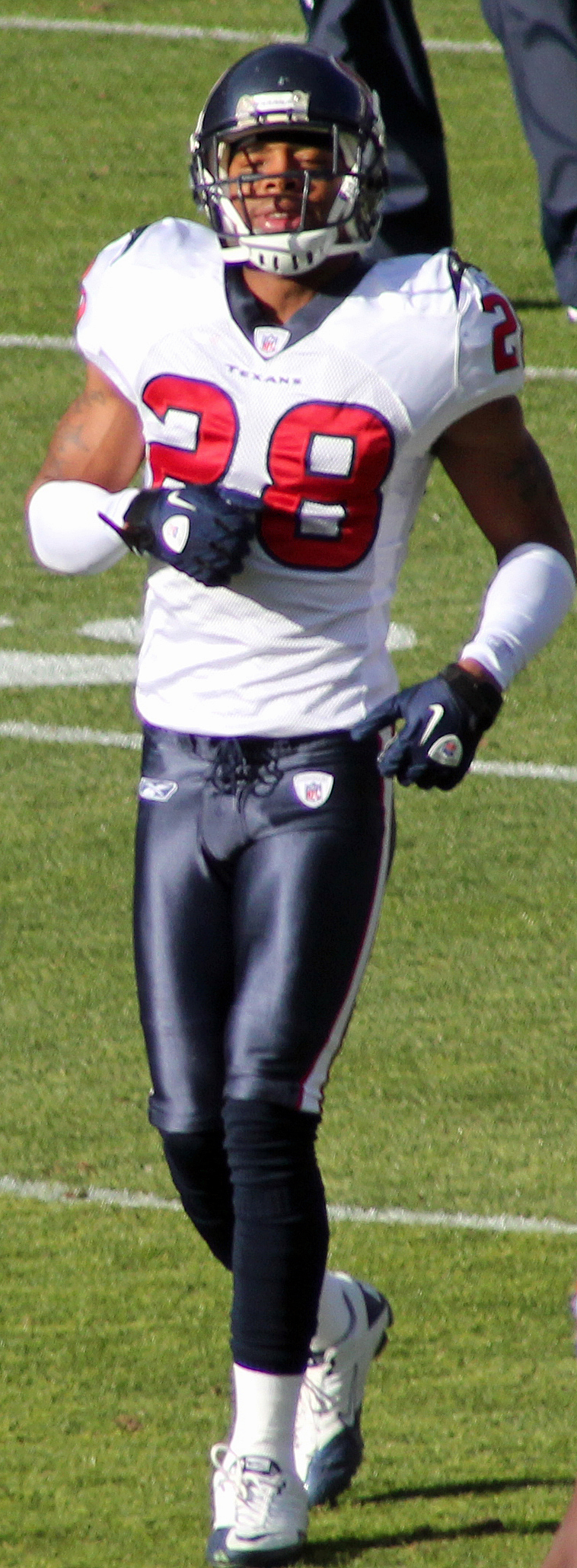
Molden with the Texans in 2010

Molden was the Houston Texans' second pick in the 2008 draft.

=== New England Patriots ===
On August 31, Molden was claimed off waivers by the New England Patriots. He recorded his first NFL interception off Vince Young of the Philadelphia Eagles during Week 12. His second career interception came off Ryan Fitzpatrick of the Buffalo Bills during Week 17. In total he played in 16 games with the New England Patriots and helped them advance to Super Bowl XLVI. Molden recorded 25 tackles throughout the 2011 NFL Season.

=== New York Giants ===
On April 11, 2012, Molden agreed to terms with the New York Giants. On August 27, 2012, his contract was terminated.

=== Jacksonville Jaguars ===
Molden was signed by the Jacksonville Jaguars on November 27, 2012. He was waived on May 7, 2013.

=== Toronto Argonauts ===
On May 28, 2014, Molden was signed by the Toronto Argonauts of the Canadian Football League. He announced his retirement in August 2014.
