= Ed Berry =

American football player (born 1963)

No. 4, 13, 20, 38
- Position: Defensive back

Personal information
- Born: September 28, 1963 (age 63); San Francisco, California, U.S.
- Listed height: 5 ft 10 in (1.78 m)
- Listed weight: 183 lb (83 kg)

Career information
- High school: Carlmont (Belmont, California)
- College: Utah State
- NFL draft: 1986: 7th round, 183rd overall pick

Career history
- Green Bay Packers (1986)*; San Diego Chargers (1987); San Francisco 49ers (1988)*; Toronto Argonauts (1988–1992); Edmonton Eskimos (1993–1994); Memphis Mad Dogs (1995); Toronto Argonauts (1996); San Jose SaberCats (1997)
- * Offseason or practice squad member only

Awards and highlights
- 3× Grey Cup champion (1991, 1993, 1996); CFL Eastern All-Star (1989)

Career NFL statistics
- Fumble recoveries: 1
- Stats at Pro Football Reference

Edward Berry (born September 28, 1963) is an American former professional football player who was a defensive back in the National Football League (NFL) Canadian Football League (CFL). He was a CFL Eastern All-Star with the Toronto Argonauts in 1989. He played college football for the Utah State Aggies.

== Professional career ==
After playing at Utah State University, Berry was selected in the seventh round of the 1986 NFL draft by the Green Bay Packers with the 183rd overall pick and played 16 games in 1986. The following season, he played two games with the San Diego Chargers.

Berry played nine seasons in the CFL, with the Toronto Argonauts, Edmonton Eskimos, Memphis Mad Dogs and finally the Toronto Argonauts again. He was an Eastern All-Star in 1989. Berry won two Grey Cups as an Argonaut, in 1991 and 1996. His 50-yard interception return for a touchdown on Calgary's opening series in the 1991 Grey Cup set the tone for the Argos' 36-21 victory over the Stampeders.
