= Dick Shatto =

American gridiron football player (1933–2003)

Profile
- Position: Running back

Personal information
- Born: February 5, 1933; Springfield, Ohio, U.S.
- Died: February 4, 2003 (aged 69); New Port Richey, Florida, U.S.

Career information
- College: Kentucky
- NFL draft: 1956: 15th round, 180th overall pick

Career history
- 1954–1965: Toronto Argonauts

Awards and highlights
- 2× CFL All-Star (1963, 1964); 8× CFL East All-Star (1956–1959, 1961–1964); 2× Jeff Russel Memorial Trophy (1957, 1964); Toronto Argonauts No. 22 retired

Career CFL statistics
- Games played: 159
- Passing yards: 1,197
- TD–INT: 15–13
- Rushing yards: 7,007
- Receiving yards: 6,684
- Touchdowns: 91
- Canadian Football Hall of Fame (Class of 1975)

Richard Darrell Shatto (February 5, 1933 – February 4, 2003) was a professional Canadian football player for the Canadian Football League (CFL) Toronto Argonauts. Shatto also served as the Argonauts general manager after his playing days with the club ended.

Shatto's playing career with the Argos lasted twelve seasons, from 1954 to 1965. His #22 jersey is one of only four that has been retired by the club. Shatto was one of the most productive players in the CFL and for a team that made the playoffs only three times during his career: 1955, 1960, and 1961. During Shatto's playing tenure with the club, the Argos finished last in their conference eight times.

Dick Shatto was inducted into the Ontario Sports Hall of Fame in 1997.

== College football career ==
Shatto played collegiately for the University of Kentucky Wildcats. Following college, Shatto was drafted in the 15th round of the 1956 NFL draft by the Los Angeles Rams.

== Professional football career ==
Shatto held the record for most career touchdowns with 91, of which 39 were rushing and 52 were receiving; his 91 career touchdowns is the eighth highest in league history.

Shatto was the all-time leader for the most combined (rushing and receiving) yardage with 13,642 yards that came on 1322 carries and 466 receptions. Presently he still ranks in seventh place, and he is still third among running backs, passed only by George Reed and Mike Pringle. His most productive season was 1960 when he carried the ball 122 times for 708 yards with a touchdown and caught 53 passes for 894 yards with ten more majors for a total yards from scrimmage of 1,602.

When it comes to total yardage, that also includes return yardage from punts, kickoffs and missed field goals, as well as yards from scrimmage, Shatto accumulated a total of 15,725 yards. That put him second all-time in 1965 and since then he has dropped to only seventh place.

Shatto never surpassed 1,000 yards in a season either rushing or receiving. However, he averaged 1,136 yards per season in yards from scrimmage. His best seasons in running the ball came in 1958 and 1959 when he tallied 969 and 950 yards respectively. The former was a team record at the time according to official statistics. Also he never led the CFL or the Eastern Conference in rushing yards. Shatto's 6,958 rushing yards remains to this day an Argonaut team record and at the end of his career he was sixth all-time. He provided the Argos with 16 100-yard rushing games.

As a receiver Shatto accumulated 6,684 yards and his best season came in 1963 with 67 receptions for 945 yards and ten touchdowns. When he left the game he was the number two all-time receiver. He led the Eastern Conference in receptions in 1962 (47), 1963 (67) and 1964 (53).

Shatto was the Argos' nominee for the Most Outstanding Player Award in 1955, 1957–59, and 1962–64 and was the league's runner-up in 1955, 1958 and 1964. Plus he was an Eastern All-Star from 1956 to 1959 and 1961-64. He was named to the league's all-star squad (not started until 1962) in 1963 and 1964. Following press rumours of a possible trade to Montreal, on September 17, 1965, Shatto announced his decision to retire at the end of the 1965 CFL season. Toronto mayor Philip Givens declared October 16, 1965, the date of Shatto's last home game with the Argonauts, "Dick Shatto Day" in Toronto, and, at the player's request, the club donated the proceeds of the game to the building fund of the Hospital for Sick Children.

Once Shatto had retired as a player, he worked as a commentator for Argos and eventually became their marketing director, where he oversaw the team's highest ever attendance in 1975, which set a new record. He was inducted into the Canadian Football Hall of Fame in 1975 and spent a year as the Argos team general manager in 1978.

== Colour commentator and Argonauts general manager ==
From 1970 to 1973, Shatto was a colour commentator for the CFL on CTV.

In 1976, Shatto became general manager of the Argonauts. The Argonauts went 17-30-1 in Shatto's three seasons as general manager, making the playoffs once.

== Personal life and death ==
He was married to Lynne Shatto, whom he met when she was a cheerleader; they had five children. One of his daughters, Cindy Shatto, represented Canada in 3 Metres Springboard diving at the 1974 British Commonwealth Games and in Women's 10 metre platform diving at the 1976 Summer Olympics.

Shatto died on February 4, 2003, from lung cancer, in New Port Richey, Florida. His ashes were spread over the site of old Exhibition Stadium.
