= Doyle Orange =

American gridiron football player (born 1951)

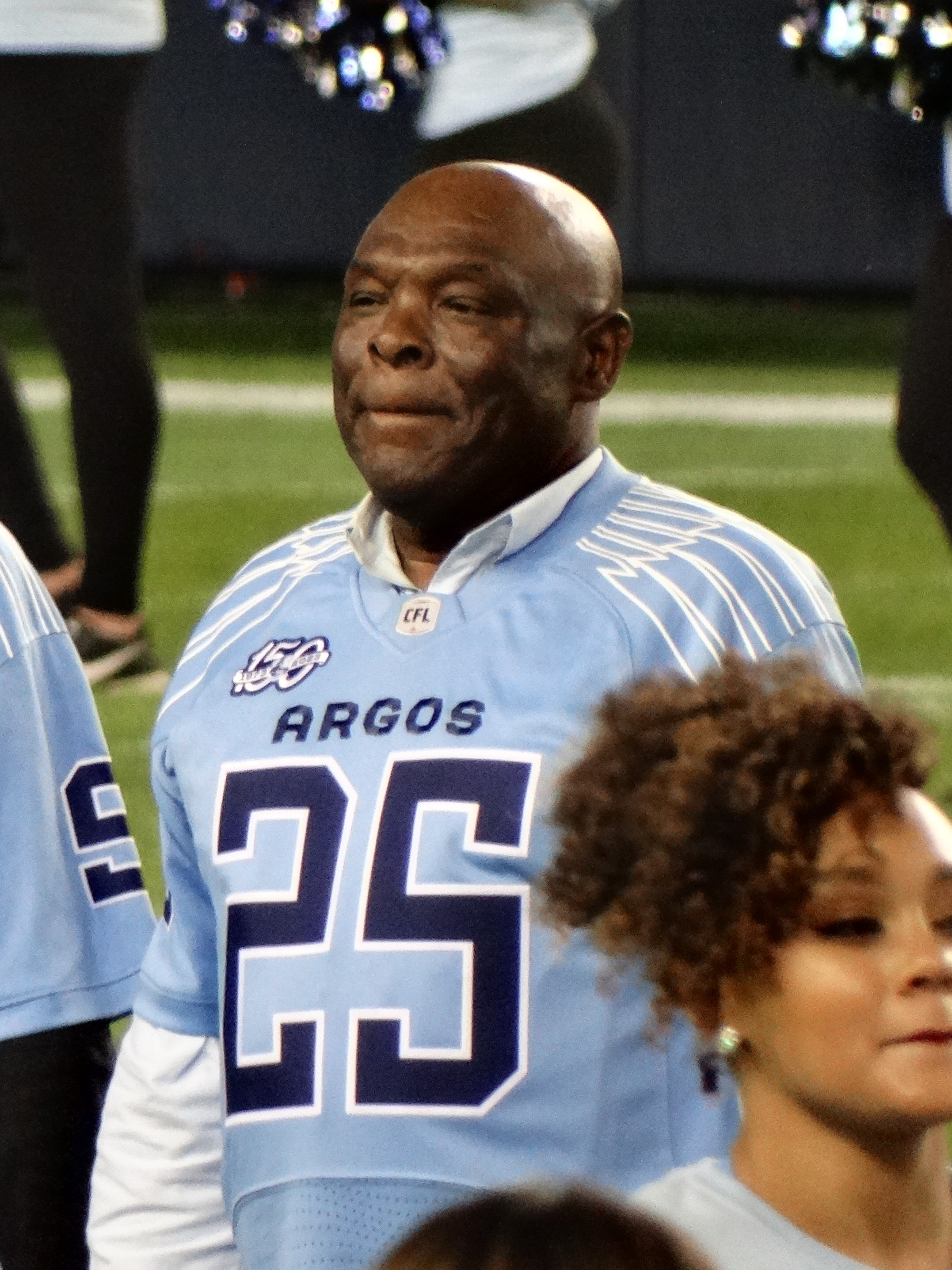
- Orange in 2023

No. 25
- Position: Running back

Personal information
- Born: August 6, 1951 (age 75); Waycross, Georgia, U.S.
- Listed height: 5 ft 11 in (1.80 m)
- Listed weight: 200 lb (91 kg)

Career information
- College: Southern Mississippi
- NFL draft: 1974: 6th round, 147th overall pick

Career history
- 1974–1976: Toronto Argonauts
- 1977: Hamilton Tiger-Cats

Awards and highlights
- CFL East All-Star (1975)

Doyle Orange (born August 6, 1951) is a former all-star running back in the CFL for the Toronto Argonauts.

Having played college football with the Southern Miss Golden Eagles, Orange was drafted by the Atlanta Falcons, but came to Canada in 1974. He rushed for 870 yards in his first season, and was the Argos second 1,000-yard rusher in 1975, with 1,134 yards (Hall of Famer Bill Symons was first). He was named an all-star, and on August 13, against the Hamilton Tiger-Cats, he rushed a league record 37 times (for 175 yards). He was injured in 1976, rushing for only 101 yards in two games, and finished his career in Hamilton, where he played eight games and rushed for 380 yards. He played 31 regular season games for the Boatmen. He rushed for 2,406 yards in four seasons.

Orange settled in Toronto and works for the City of Toronto Parks and Recreation Department.
