= Gill Fenerty =

American gridiron football player (born 1963)

Profile
- Position: Running back

Personal information
- Born: August 24, 1963 (age 63); New Orleans, Louisiana, U.S.
- Listed height: 6 ft 0 in (1.83 m)
- Listed weight: 205 lb (93 kg)

Career information
- High school: Jesuit (New Orleans)
- College: Holy Cross
- NFL draft: 1986: 7th round, 173rd overall pick

Career history
- 1986: Bolzano Jets
- 1987–1989: Toronto Argonauts
- 1990–1993: New Orleans Saints
- 1994: Shreveport Pirates

Awards and highlights
- 3× CFL All-Star (1987, 1988, 1989); CFL Rookie of the Year (1987)
- Stats at Pro Football Reference

Lawrence Gill Fenerty (born August 24, 1963), nicknamed "Gill the Thrill", is an American former professional football running back in the Canadian Football League (CFL), National Football League (NFL), and Italian Football League (IFL).

Fenerty graduated from Jesuit High School (New Orleans) and attended the College of the Holy Cross, where in 1983, he rushed for 337 yards (on 18 carries) and 6 touchdowns versus Columbia University in a 77 to 28 victory. He is the program's all-time leading rusher with 3,680 yards. He was drafted in the seventh round of the 1986 NFL Draft with the 173rd overall pick by the New Orleans Saints but was released.

Fenerty started his professional career in 1986 playing in the Italian Football League for the Bolzano Jets, where he rushed for 610 yards in the second half of the regular season in (5 games). He helped the Jets win two playoff games before losing in the league semi finals to the Bologna Warriors.

In his first year with Toronto, 1987, he rushed for 879 yards and caught 53 passes, winning the CFL's Most Outstanding Rookie Award. He also scored a 61-yard touchdown reception during the Argos' last-second loss in the classic 75th Grey Cup game. In 1988, he would rush for 968 and catch 51 passes. On August 31 of that year, Fenerty rushed for a team record 215 yards in a single game against the Calgary Stampeders, eclipsing Ulysses Curtis' 36-year-old team record by seven yards. In 1989, Fenerty set a then team record with 1247 yards rushing. He was a CFL all star selection in every season he played, totalling 48 games.

Fenerty moved to his hometown to play for the New Orleans Saints of the National Football League for the 1990 through 1993 seasons. He played 31 games scoring on five rushing touchdowns and adding two more on pass receptions. Fenerty rushed for 335 yards in 1990 and 477 yards in 1991, totaling 832 rushing yards in the two seasons. He also caught 44 passes for 444 yards, as well as 655 yards returning punts and kickoffs. He spent 1992 and 1993 on the Saints injured reserve with knee operations.

Fenerty ended his career with a brief stint with the CFL expansion Shreveport Pirates in 1994.
