= Reggie Pleasant =

American gridiron football player (born 1962)

No. 35, 2, 6
- Position: Defensive back

Personal information
- Born: May 2, 1962 (age 64); Pinewood, South Carolina, U.S.
- Listed height: 5 ft 9 in (1.75 m)
- Listed weight: 175 lb (79 kg)

Career information
- College: Clemson
- NFL draft: 1985: 6th round, 152nd overall pick

Career history
- Atlanta Falcons (1985); Tampa Bay Buccaneers (1986)*; Toronto Argonauts (1987–1994); Edmonton Eskimos (1996–1997)
- * Offseason or practice squad member only

Awards and highlights
- Grey Cup champion (1991); CFL All-Star (1988); National champion (1981)
- Stats at Pro Football Reference

Reginald Lecarno Pleasant (born May 2, 1962) is an American former professional football defensive back. Playing collegiately for Clemson University, where he won a National Championship in 1981. He then played in the Canadian Football League (CFL) for eleven seasons with the Toronto Argonauts and Edmonton Eskimos. He won a Grey Cup with the Argonauts in 1991. He started his career with the Atlanta Falcons, who selected him in the sixth round of the 1985 NFL draft, of the National Football League (NFL) in 1985. He still holds the Toronto Argonauts record for the most career interceptions and most interception return yards.
