= 79th Grey Cup =

1991 Canadian Football championship game

Toronto Argonauts	Calgary Stampeders
(13–5)	(11–7)
36	21
Head coach: Adam Rita	Head coach: Wally Buono
	1	2	3	4	Total
Toronto Argonauts	8	3	8	17	36
Calgary Stampeders	7	3	4	7	21
- Date: November 24, 1991
- Stadium: Winnipeg Stadium
- Location: Winnipeg
- Most Valuable Player: Raghib Ismail, WR (Argonauts)
- Most Valuable Canadian: Dave Sapunjis, SB (Stampeders)
- National anthem: Burton Cummings
- Referee: Ken Lazaruk
- Halftime show: Luba, Salute to 1992 Winter Olympic Athletes
- Attendance: 51,985

Broadcasters
- Network: CBC, SRC
- Announcers: (CBC) Don Wittman, Joe Galat, Steve Armitage, Brian Williams.

The 79th Grey Cup was the 1991 Canadian Football League championship game played between the Toronto Argonauts and the Calgary Stampeders at Winnipeg Stadium in Winnipeg, Manitoba. The Argonauts defeated the Stampeders 36–21 in an entertaining game.

== Game summary ==
Toronto Argonauts (36) – TDs, Ed Berry, Darrell K. Smith, Raghib "Rocket" Ismail, Paul Masotti; FGs Lance Chomyc (2); cons., Chomyc (4); singles Chomyc (2).

Calgary Stampeders (21) – TDs, Danny Barrett, Allen Pitts; FGs, Mark McLoughlin (2); cons., McLoughlin (2); single. McLoughlin.

First quarter
TOR – TD: Berry, 50-yard interception return (Chomyc convert)
TOR – Single: Chomyc
CGY – TD: Barrett, 1-yard run (McLoughlin convert)

Second quarter
CGY – FG: McLoughlin
TOR – FG: Chomyc

Third quarter
CGY – Single: McLoughlin
CGY – FG: McLoughlin
TOR – Single: Chomyc
TOR – TD: Smith, 48-yard pass from Dunigan (Chomyc convert)

Fourth quarter
TOR – FG: Chomyc
CGY – TD: Pitts, 12-yard pass from Barrett (McLoughlin convert)
TOR – TD: Ismail, 87-yard kickoff return (Chomyc convert)
TOR – TD: Masotti, 36-yard pass from Dunigan (Chomyc convert)

The Grey Cup was held in Winnipeg for the first time. The Toronto Argonauts capped off a memorable season under the new ownership of Los Angeles Kings owner Bruce McNall, hockey player Wayne Gretzky, and actor John Candy with a win over the Calgary Stampeders.

The Argos started with a bang as defensive back Ed Berry intercepted Calgary quarterback Danny Barrett's first pass attempt and returned it 50 yards for a touchdown. Barrett atoned for this miscue late in the first quarter, calling his own number on a one-yard run over the goal line. Toronto led 8–7 after 15 minutes.

The teams exchanged field goals in the second quarter, as the Argos carried their one-point lead into halftime.

The Toronto offence kicked into gear in the second half. Trailing 14–12 with three minutes remaining in the third quarter, Argo quarterback Matt Dunigan threw a 48-yard strike to Darrell K. Smith, giving the Boatmen some life.

In the fourth quarter, Reggie Pleasant stepped in front of a Barrett pass, setting up a Lance Chomyc field goal to make it a 22–14 score in favour of Toronto. It was Pleasant's second interception of the game.

Calgary receiver Allen Pitts' narrowed the gap to 22–21 on a 12-yard touchdown reception. But Raghib "Rocket" Ismail, a much-publicized off-season pickup by the Argos, returned the ensuing kickoff 87 yards for a touchdown with 10:26 remaining. A beer can thrown from the stands narrowly missed Ismail on his way to the end zone.

When Keyvan Jenkins fumbled the ensuing kickoff, Toronto linebacker Keith Castello recovered the ball to set up a 36-yard touchdown pass from Dunigan to Paul Masotti, sealing the Argonauts' victory.

== Trivia ==
- The temperature at kickoff was −16 °C (3 °F), making the game the coldest Grey Cup final.
- The 1991 game is, to date, the last Grey Cup completed in daylight.
- Matt Dunigan, who completed only 12 of 29 passes for 142 yards, was playing with a separated shoulder suffered the previous week in the East Final. His shoulder was frozen for this game. He finally completed a Grey Cup victory from start to finish. Previously, he had lost with the Edmonton Eskimos in 1986, was injured for Edmonton's classic 1987 victory, lost with the BC Lions in 1988, and would again be on the losing side with the Winnipeg Blue Bombers in 1992. He was unable to suit up for Winnipeg in the 1993 Grey Cup due to injury.
- Danny Barrett, who completed 34 of 56 passes for 377 yards and a touchdown, but also threw three interceptions, set records for passes attempted and completed in a Grey Cup game.
- Raghib "Rocket" Ismail's 87-yard kickoff return is a Grey Cup record. Surprisingly, Ismail (who went on to have a long NFL career) admitted in a recent television interview on the CBC that he had not seen a replay of his return since the game (some 15 years earlier). The CBC provided him with a DVD copy of the game.
- This was the first Grey Cup game since 1973 to have a single Most Valuable Player award given out; from 1974 to 1990, two awards were given (one to an offensive player, one to a defensive player).
- Calgary had 28 first downs compared to Toronto's seven. The Stampeders had 406 yards of total offence compared to 174 for the Argos.
- This championship was the Toronto Argonauts' first since 1983.
- The CFL originally only engraved McNall's name on the Grey Cup as the Argos' owner. The names of Gretzky and (the by then-deceased) Candy were added in 2007. Gretzky is one of five people to have his name engraved on both the Stanley Cup and the Grey Cup (the other four are Lionel Conacher, Carl Voss, Joe Miller and Normie Kwong).
- With the shutdown of the league-run Canadian Football Network broadcast service at the end of 1990, this was the first Grey Cup game to be broadcast on only one network since 1960: CBC. All Grey Cup games since have been broadcast on CBC or, since 2008, TSN.

== 1991 CFL Playoffs ==
=== West Division ===
- Semi-final (November 10 @ Calgary, Alberta) Calgary Stampeders 43–41 BC Lions
- Final (November 17 @ Edmonton, Alberta) Calgary Stampeders 38–36 Edmonton Eskimos

=== East Division ===
- Semi-final (November 10 @ Winnipeg, Manitoba) Winnipeg Blue Bombers 26–8 Ottawa Rough Riders
- Final (November 17 @ Toronto, Ontario) Toronto Argonauts 42–3 Winnipeg Blue Bombers
