= Terry Greer =

American gridiron football player (born 1957)

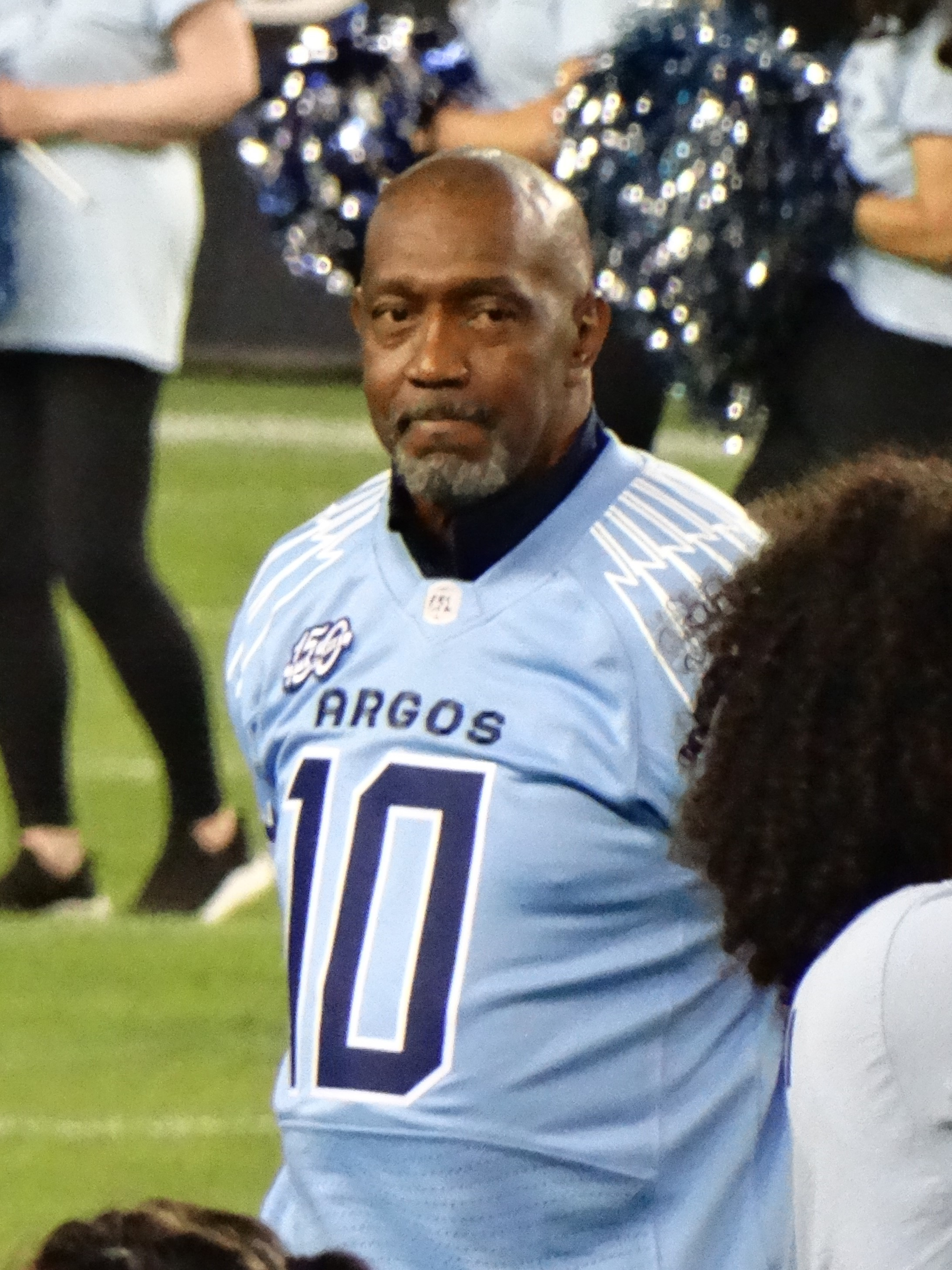
- Greer in 2023

No. 80, 29, 83, 89
- Position: Wide receiver

Personal information
- Born: September 27, 1957 (age 69); Memphis, Tennessee, U.S.

Career information
- High school: Messick (Memphis)
- College: Alabama State
- NFL draft: 1980: 11th round, 304th overall pick

Career history
- 1980–1985: Toronto Argonauts
- 1986: Los Angeles Rams*
- 1986: Cleveland Browns
- 1987–1989: San Francisco 49ers
- 1990: Detroit Lions
- * Offseason or practice squad member only

Awards and highlights
- 2× Super Bowl champion (XXIII, XXIV); Grey Cup champion (1983); Jeff Russel Memorial Trophy (1983); 2× CFL All-Star (1982, 1983); 4× CFL East All-Star (1982, 1983, 1984, 1985)
- Stats at Pro Football Reference
- Canadian Football Hall of Fame (Class of 2019)

Terry Greer (born September 27, 1957) is a former professional American and Canadian football player who played wide receiver with the Canadian Football League (CFL)'s Toronto Argonauts and the Cleveland Browns and San Francisco 49ers of the National Football League (NFL). He held the CFL record for most catches in a season; he is a member of the Argonauts all-time team and his #10 has been honored by the team. Greer was the first to gain 2,000 yards receiving in a professional football season.

Greer was elected into the Canadian Football Hall of Fame in 2019.

== Early life ==
Greer was born on September 27, 1957, in Memphis, Tennessee, to his mother, Pauline Greer, and his father, Perry Key. He attended Alabama State University where he was offered both basketball and football athletic scholarships, choosing football.

== Professional career ==
Greer first was picked by the Los Angeles Rams in the 11th round of the 1980 NFL Draft but before playing a single game, he signed with the Canadian Football League team Toronto Argonauts. The 1983 season was his most productive year. He led the team to the Grey Cup in an 18-17 win over the BC Lions at BC Place Stadium. He was the MOP of the CFL East Division and was the first professional football receiver to gain 2,000 yards in a season, with 2,003. He left CFL to join the Cleveland Browns after the 1985 CFL season.

Greer made his NFL debut with the Cleveland Browns in 1986, playing with the team for one season before being traded to the San Francisco 49ers. As a helper off the bench, Greer recorded 15 and 26 yards per catch in Super Bowl XXIII and Super Bowl XXIV seasons, respectively. He also recorded one regular-season touchdown in his first season with the 49ers. In 1990, Greer made his last stand in his playing career with the Detroit Lions as he recorded 3 touchdowns before retiring.

== Post-football ==
He has two Super Bowl rings and a Grey Cup ring; he is also the first player in pro football history to win both championships; he is also one of only eight players to have won both championships. In 1996, Greer coached for the Hamilton Tiger-Cats for a season before officially retiring. Currently, he and his family live near Cleveland, Ohio. He is married with two daughters and a son.

== Professional statistics ==
CFL		Receiving					
Year	Team	G	Rec	Yds	Avg	Lng	TD
1980	Toronto Argonauts	14	37	522	14.9	39	2
1981	Toronto Argonauts	6	21	284	13.5	45	3
1982	Toronto Argonauts	15	85	1,466	17.2	61	11
1983	Toronto Argonauts	16	113	2,003	17.7	72	8
1984	Toronto Argonauts	15	70	1,189	17	61	14
1985	Toronto Argonauts	16	78	1,323	17	65	9
Total		82	404	6,817	16.9	65	47

NFL		Receiving						
Year	Team	G	GS	Rec	Yds	Avg	Lng	TD
1986	Cleveland Browns	11	0	3	51	17.0	22	0
1987	San Francisco 49ers	3	0	6	111	18.5	50	1
1988	San Francisco 49ers	10	0	8	120	15.0	31	0
1989	San Francisco 49ers	11	0	1	26	26.0	26	0
1990	Detroit Lions	15	0	20	332	16.6	68T	3
total		50	0	38	640	18.2	39	4
