= Bill McFarlane =

Canadian football player (1930–2020)

Profile
- Positions: Defensive back, Halfback

Personal information
- Born: March 30, 1930; Hamilton, Ontario, Canada
- Died: June 28, 2020 (aged 90); Burlington, Ontario, Canada
- Listed height: 5 ft 10 in (1.78 m)
- Listed weight: 180 lb (82 kg)

Career information
- University: Toronto

Career history
- 1954–1956: Toronto Argonauts

William McLean McFarlane (March 30, 1930 – June 28, 2020) was a professional Canadian football end who played for the Toronto Argonauts. He was drafted first overall in the 1954 CFL Draft by the Argonauts.
