= Darrell K. Smith =

American gridiron football player (1961–2017)

No. 1
- Positions: Wide receiver, Slotback

Personal information
- Born: November 5, 1961; Youngstown, Ohio, U.S.
- Died: February 13, 2017 (aged 55); Atlanta, Georgia, U.S.
- Listed height: 6 ft 2 in (1.88 m)
- Listed weight: 192 lb (87 kg)

Career information
- High school: Ursuline (OH)
- College: Central State, Ohio

Career history
- 1984: Dallas Cowboys*
- 1985: Cincinnati Bengals*
- 1986–1992: Toronto Argonauts
- 1993: Edmonton Eskimos
- 1994: Shreveport Pirates*
- * Offseason or practice squad member only

Awards and highlights
- Grey Cup champion (1991); 2× CFL All-Star (1987, 1990); 5× CFL East All-Star (1987, 1988, 1989, 1990, 1991)

Darrell Karland Smith (November 5, 1961 – February 13, 2017) was a wide receiver in the Canadian Football League (CFL) for the Toronto Argonauts and Edmonton Eskimos. He played college football at Central State University.

== Early life ==
Smith attended Ursuline High School, where he played as a quarterback, running back and defensive back. He also practiced basketball. He accepted a football scholarship from Central State University, with the intention of playing him at running back.

As senior in 1983, he led the team with 47 receptions for 814 yards (17.3-yard avg.) and 17 touchdowns in 12 games. He contributed to the team finishing with a 12–0 record school and making its first Division II playoff appearance, where they lost the title game to the University of North Dakota.

== Professional career ==
In 1984, he was signed as an undrafted free agent by the Dallas Cowboys. He was released on August 27. On November 29, he was signed as a free agent by the Cincinnati Bengals, for the 1985 training camp. He was released on August 12, 1985.

In 1986, he signed as a free agent with the Toronto Argonauts of the Canadian Football League.

In 1990, he caught a league record of 20 touchdowns, to go along with 1,826 receiving yards. He finished his career with the Argonauts with 465 receptions for 8,144 yards, 52 touchdowns and 84 kickoffs returns for 1,139 yards. He set team records for single-season touchdown receptions (20), consecutive games with a reception (96) and average yards per catch (17.5). He ranks second All-time in career and single-season 200-yard receiving games (2), third in receiving yards in a single-season (1,826) and 100-yard receiving games (25), and fifth in receiving touchdowns (111) and combined yards (9,374). He appeared in two Grey Cup games with the Argonauts, losing in 1987 and winning in 1991.

In January 1993, he was traded to the Edmonton Eskimos as a part of the largest trade in CFL history, involving 16 players. In August, he was released after appearing in 4 games.

In 1994, he signed as a free agent with the Canadian Football League expansion franchise Shreveport Pirates. He was released before the start of the season. He finished his football career with 476 receptions for 8,236 yards and 52 touchdowns.

== Personal life ==
On February 13, 2017, he died of cancer at the age of 55. His brother was former NFL player Sherman Smith. Married: Frances Foster Children: Daimeyon K Smith
