= Ron Morris (Canadian football) =

Player of American and Canadian football

Profile
- Positions: Defensive halfback, offensive halfback, punter, split end

Personal information
- Born: July 13, 1936 (age 90)

Career information
- College: Tulsa

Career history

Playing
- 1959–61: Calgary Stampeders
- 1961–63: Toronto Argonauts
- 1963–65: BC Lions

Coaching
- 1967–68: BC Lions (assistant coach)
- 1967: BC Lions (Interim Head Coach)

Awards and highlights
- Grey Cup champion (52nd)

Ron Morris (born July 13, 1936) is a former professional football player and coach in the Canadian Football League who played for the Calgary Stampeders, Toronto Argonauts, and BC Lions and served as the interim head coach of the Lions for one game in 1967.

Morris signed with the Stampeders in January 1959. He was used by the Stamps as a running back, defensive halfback, and punter. In 1961, he was purchased by the Toronto Argonauts for $350. while playing for the Argos against the then defending champions of the 1960 Grey Cup, Ottawa RoughRiders, he set a CFL playoff record by catching 4 touchdown passes from QB Tobin Rote.Morris is also credited with the second most points scored (24) and most touchdowns scored in a playoff game. He was waived by Toronto in September 1963. A week later he was claimed by the BC Lions to replace the injured Tom Larscheid. While with BC, Morris was a member of the Lions team that won the 52nd Grey Cup.

In 1967, Morris joined the Lions coaching staff, coaching both the offensive and defensive halfbacks. He served as the Lions' interim head coach for one game between the firing of Dave Skrien and the arrival of Jim Champion. Morris' only game as head coach ended in an 18–17 loss to Toronto. He retired from coaching after the 1968 season to work in real estate.

== See also ==
- List of NCAA major college football yearly passing leaders
