= Michael Jenkins (running back) =

American gridiron football player (born 1976)

No. 27
- Position: Running back

Personal information
- Born: August 27, 1976 (age 50); Bethesda, Maryland, U.S.
- Listed height: 5 ft 7 in (1.70 m)
- Listed weight: 207 lb (94 kg)

Career information
- College: Arkansas

Career history
- 2000–2001: Toronto Argonauts
- 2002: Houston Texans*
- 2003: Toronto Argonauts
- 2005: Montreal Alouettes
- 2005: Edmonton Eskimos
- * Offseason or practice squad member only

Awards and highlights
- Grey Cup champion (2005); CFL All-Star (2001); CFL East All-Star (2001); John Candy Memorial Award (Argonauts MOP 2001)

Michael Jenkins (born August 27, 1976) is an American former professional football running back who played in the Canadian Football League (CFL).

Jenkins attended the University of Wyoming in 1997 and University of Arkansas from 1998 to 1999.

== Amateur career ==
Jenkins was born in Bethesda, Maryland. He played at Monta Vista High School in Cupertino, California. The head coach during that time was Danny Benjamin, who later became Jenkins' agent. Jenkins went on to play two seasons at Coffeyville Junior College.

=== University of Wyoming ===
Michael Jenkins lettered at the University of Wyoming in 1997, rushing for 605 yards and a team-high 10 touchdowns. He finished second on the team in rushing yards and was also second on the team in receiving yards, catching 25 passes for 341 yards and two touchdowns.

=== University of Arkansas ===
Jenkins transferred from Wyoming to the University of Arkansas, redshirting the 1998 season. Jenkins played in the 1999 season under Coach Houston Nutt. During his one season with the Razorbacks he finished third on the team in rushing with 224 yards and three touchdowns. Jenkins had a 42-yard touchdown run in the 2000 Cotton Bowl Classic, helping Arkansas defeat the Texas Longhorns, 27–6.

== Professional career ==
=== Toronto Argonauts ===
In 2000, Jenkins joined the Toronto Argonauts as a free agent. In his rookie year, Jenkins played all 18 games and rushed for 1,050 rushing yards with two touchdowns and had 400 yards receiving. Upon the season's completion, he was voted the team's rookie of the year. With his small size and his large rushing numbers, comparisons between Jenkins and his head coach Pinball Clemons (who was a star running back during his playing days) naturally emerged.

During the 2001 season, Jenkins set an Argonauts team record for most rushing yards in a season with 1484 rushing yards on 271 carries and 8 touchdowns as well as 361 receiving yards and 5 touchdowns. Earlier in the season, there was great concern by the fans over whether Jenkins' running abilities would have been stifled because of the "pass-happy" philosophy of offensive co-ordinator John Jenkins. However, head coach Clemons put his coaching authority to use and called for a more balanced offensive attack combining the pass and running games to better utilize Michael Jenkins' game. The Football Reporters of Canada selected Jenkins as the winner of the 2001 John Candy Memorial Award, which is given to the Toronto Argonauts player of the year.

Jenkins left the Argonauts in 2002 to sign with the Houston Texans, where he spent the season as a member of the team's practice squad, and he returned to the Argonauts in 2003. However, he was not able to regain the form that he had when he first joined the team. After coming back from the NFL, Jenkins' weight increased. That, combined with an abductor/groin injury in the pre-season, and recurring ankle injuries factored into his decreased productivity. Despite those shortcomings throughout the season, Jenkins rushed for 195 yards in a game vs. the Edmonton Eskimos on August 17, 2003, and earned the CFL Offensive Player of the Week Award for the achievement. For the season, Jenkins rushed for 814 yards on 156 carries with 6 rushing touchdowns, along with 316 yards receiving. Shortly thereafter, he had surgery on his injured ankles, which had hampered him during the season.

=== Injury and return to football ===
On May 17, 2004, Jenkins was released by the Argonauts, less than a month after the team signed free agent running back John Avery. Months later, Jenkins' agent, Danny Benjamin, alleged that his client would miss the entire 2004 CFL season because of the injured ankles and that the injury would not have been that serious had Jenkins not have gotten bad advice from Toronto's female trainer, Erin Brooks. Benjamin said "I have a problem with female trainers because they're female and they don't understand the male body. Their bodies are different." Brooks laughed off the allegations by saying, "Injuries are injuries. Tissues are the same (in males and females)." Brooks was fired from the Argonauts in 2010, and won a settlement of $975,000 in 2012 after alleging in a lawsuit that she was terminated only because she was a woman.

=== Montreal Alouettes ===
On February 18, 2005, Jenkins signed with the Montreal Alouettes, but much of his time was split between the practice roster and the injured list. He was subsequently released by the Alouettes in July.

=== Edmonton Eskimos ===
On August 22, 2005, Jenkins signed with the Edmonton Eskimos, and only played in one game on September 9, 2005, vs. the Calgary Stampeders. In that game he rushed for 30 yards on 8 carries, and caught one pass for 11 yards. Jenkins went on to win a Grey Cup championship with the Eskimos that year. He finished his CFL career with 3378 rushing yards and 16 touchdowns, and 1077 yards receiving.
