= Cory Boyd =

American football player (born 1985)

No. 3
- Position: Running back

Personal information
- Born: August 6, 1985 (age 41); Orange, New Jersey, U.S.
- Listed height: 6 ft 1 in (1.85 m)
- Listed weight: 235 lb (107 kg)

Career information
- High school: Orange
- College: South Carolina
- NFL draft: 2008: 7th round, 238th overall pick

Career history
- 2008: Tampa Bay Buccaneers
- 2008: Denver Broncos
- 2010–2012: Toronto Argonauts
- 2012: Edmonton Eskimos

Awards and highlights
- CFL All-Star (2010); 3× CFL East All-Star (2010–2012)

Career NFL statistics
- Rushing yards: 2,500
- Rushing average: 6.1
- Rushing touchdowns: 12
- Stats at Pro Football Reference
- Stats at CFL.ca (archive)

Cory J. Boyd (born August 6, 1985) is an American former professional football player who was a running back in the National Football League (NFL) and Canadian Football League CFL). He was selected by the Tampa Bay Buccaneers in the 7th round of the 2008 NFL draft. He played college football for the South Carolina Gamecocks.

== Early life ==
Boyd played high school football and basketball at Orange High School, earning him a football scholarship to the University of South Carolina.

== College career ==
Boyd played for legendary coaches Lou Holtz and Steve Spurrier while at South Carolina. He finished ranked 10th all time in Gamecocks rushing with 2,267 total yards and 9th all time in yards receiving with 1,283 total yards. Boyd finished with 28 touchdowns in his 4 seasons with the Gamecocks. He played in the 2007 East-West Shrine Game.

== Professional career ==
=== Tampa Bay Buccaneers ===
Boyd was selected by the Tampa Bay Buccaneers in the seventh round (238rd overall) of the 2008 NFL draft. He injured his knee during a rookie mini-camp and was placed on injured reserve for the 2008 season. Boyd was released by Tampa Bay on October 17, 2008.

=== Denver Broncos ===
Boyd was signed to the practice squad of the Denver Broncos on November 4, 2008 after running back P. J. Pope was promoted to the active roster. Boyd was promoted to the active roster on December 9 when fullback Peyton Hillis was placed on injured reserve. The Broncos waived Boyd six days later and re-signed him to the practice squad. He was then put back onto the active roster for Week 17 of the 2008 season following the season-ending injuries to Selvin Young and P.J. Pope.

The Broncos waived Boyd on March 31, 2009.

=== Toronto Argonauts ===
Boyd signed as a free agent with the Toronto Argonauts of the Canadian Football League on March 12, 2010 and was extended with Toronto on March 21, 2011. In his first year in the CFL, he rushed for 1,359 yards and had 363 yards receiving in spite of missing several games due to injuries. Boyd received several post-season honors including being named the CFL's toughest player, the Argonauts' most outstanding player and was also nominated to the CFL East All-Star Team. For 2011, Boyd rushed for 1,141 yards and had 118 yards receiving having missed multiple games due to injuries. Once again, Boyd was named a RB for the CFL East All-Star Team.

Boyd was released by the Toronto Argonauts on August 12, 2012. At the time of his release, Boyd led the CFL in rushing.

=== Edmonton Eskimos ===
Hours after his release from Toronto, Boyd joined the Edmonton Eskimos. On October 11, 2012, Cory Boyd was released by the Eskimos. Boyd saw limited playing time (76 yards through 8 games) as the Eskimos backfield became very crowded with Hugh Charles and Jerome Messam. He was re-signed on October 21 after an injury to Hugh Charles.

=== Post-retirement ===
Boyd now coaches football at South Carolina Faith Athletics & Music College in Charleston Sc.
