= Lance Chomyc =

Canadian gridiron football player (born 1963)

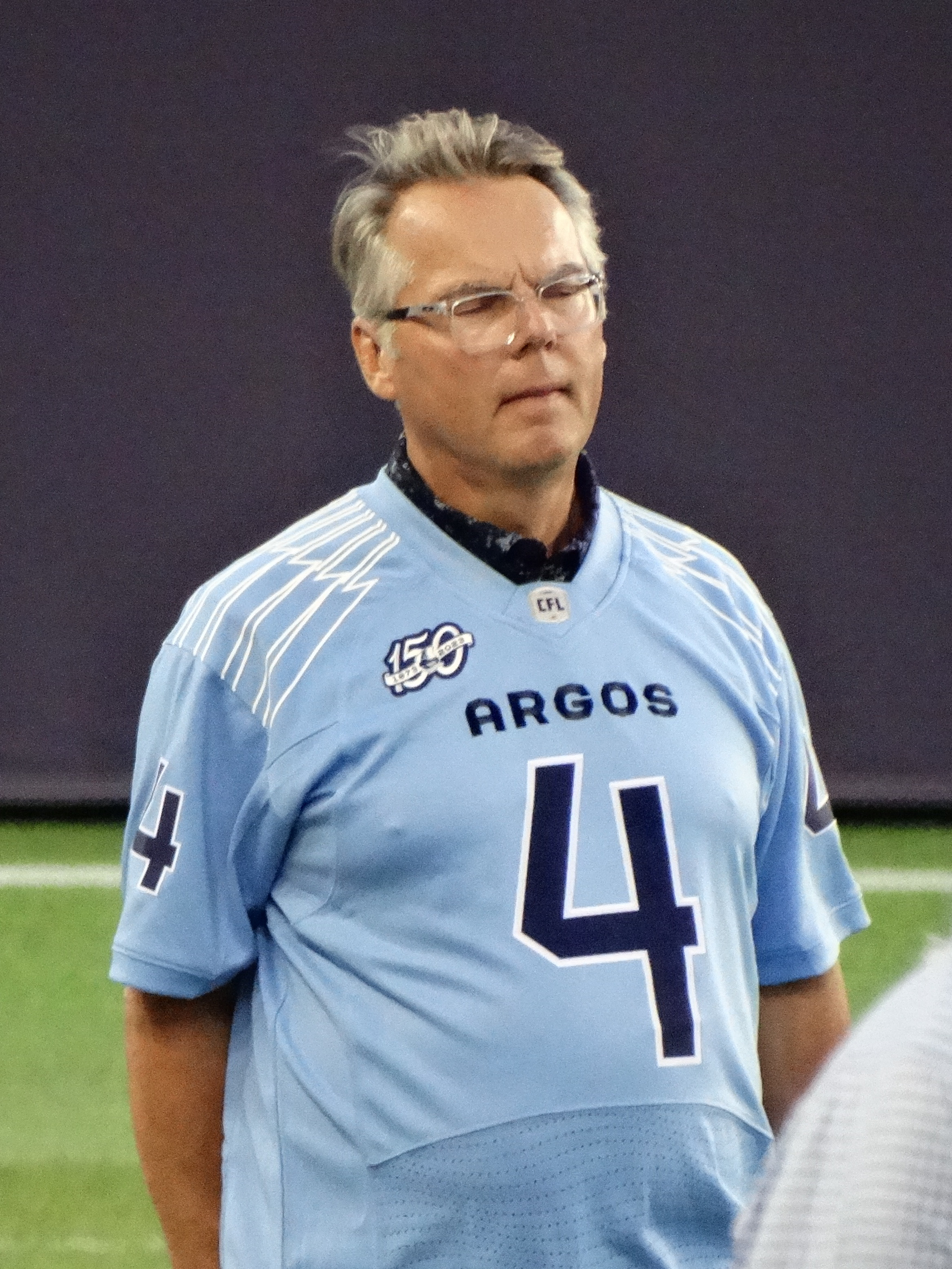
- Chomyc in 2023

No. 4
- Position: Placekicker

Personal information
- Born: March 2, 1963 (age 63); Edmonton, Alberta, Canada
- Listed height: 6 ft 0 in (1.83 m)
- Listed weight: 200 lb (91 kg)

Career information
- University: Toronto
- CFL draft: 1985: 6th round, 46th overall pick

Career history
- 1985: Ottawa Rough Riders*
- 1985–1993: Toronto Argonauts
- * Offseason or practice squad member only

Awards and highlights
- Grey Cup champion (1991); Lew Hayman Trophy (1991); 2× CFL All-Star (1986, 1991); 2× CFL East All-Star (1986, 1991); CFL single-season points record: 236 (1991)

Lance Chomyc (born March 2, 1963) is a former placekicker from 1985 to 1993 for the Toronto Argonauts of the Canadian Football League (CFL). In 1986 and 1991, he was a CFL All-Star. He holds the Guinness World Record for most points scored in a Canadian football season, having scored 236 points during the 1991 CFL season. Chomyc was most recently an English teacher at Bear Creek Secondary School in Barrie, Ontario until early 2020.
