= Ulysses Curtis =

American football player (1926–2013)

Profile
- Position: Running back

Personal information
- Born: May 10, 1926; Albion, Michigan
- Died: October 6, 2013 (aged 87); Toronto, Ontario, Canada

Career information
- College: Florida A&M

Career history
- Toronto Argonauts (1950–1954)

Awards and highlights
- 2× Grey Cup champion (1950, 1952)

Ulysses "Crazy Legs" Curtis (May 10, 1926 – October 6, 2013) was an American professional football player who was a running back for the Toronto Argonauts of the Interprovincial Rugby Football Union from 1950 to 1954. He won two Grey Cups with Toronto in 1950 and 1952.

Curtis was long considered the Argonauts' first black player. On February 2, 2021, it was revealed that Curtis was only their second ever black player after Ken Whitlock, a halfback and kicker who played only four games for the Argonauts in 1948.

Curtis is sixth on the Argonauts all-time career touchdown list with 47 touchdowns, fourth on the Argos all-time rushing list with 3,712 yards on 529 carries, second on the Argos all-time list with most yards in a game with 208 yards, and third on the team list of most 100-yard rushing games with 12.

After retirement from football, Curtis remained in Toronto and raised his family. He owned a cleaning business and later became a teacher and coach in the North York Board of Education. In 1959 he coached the North York Knights, a team that played in the national Canadian Junior Football championships. He also helped coach the York University football team in the 1960s.

He was named to the Toronto Argonauts All-Time Argos List in 2005.

Curtis died October 6, 2013, in Toronto.
