= Bill Symons =

American gridiron football player (born 1943)

No. 33
- Positions: Running back, Safety, Slotback

Personal information
- Born: June 14, 1943 (age 83); Nucla, Colorado, U.S.
- Listed height: 6 ft 0 in (1.83 m)
- Listed weight: 215 lb (98 kg)

Career information
- College: Colorado
- NFL draft: 1965: 6th round, 80th overall pick
- AFL draft: 1965: 20th round, 157th overall pick

Career history
- 1966: BC Lions
- 1967–1973: Toronto Argonauts

Awards and highlights
- CFL's Most Outstanding Player Award (1968); Jeff Russel Trophy (1970); CFL All-Star (1968); 2× CFL East All-Star (1968, 1970)
- Canadian Football Hall of Fame (Class of 1997)

Bill Symons (born June 14, 1943) is an American former professional football running back with the Toronto Argonauts of the Canadian Football League (CFL).

== College career ==
Symons played for the University of Colorado Buffaloes between 1962 and 1964. He was a versatile player, running, leading the team in receptions, punt returns and kickoff returns, and doing some punting.

== Professional career ==
In 1965, Symons was drafted by the NFL's Green Bay Packers in the 6th round (80th overall) and by the AFL's Kansas City Chiefs in the 20th round (157th overall). He attended two Green Bay training camps, and almost made the team, but an injury led Vince Lombardi to cut him.

The BC Lions took a chance on Symons in 1966. He only played 10 games, most at the defensive safety position. He rushed for only 20 yards, as the Lions were not convinced his knee injury had fully healed. At the end of the seasons, the Lions were eager to get the rights to the eventual CFL great and Hall of Famer Jim Young. Bill Symons was the second player in the trade that also sent all-star defensive lineman Dick Fouts to the Toronto Argonauts in exchange for Young, perhaps the only trade between Hall of Famers.

The Toronto Argonauts, with their new head coach Leo Cahill, were determined to turn their losing ways around, and in 1967, Symons was given a chance. He did not disappoint, picking up 349 yards rushing and positioning himself as a starter.

Everything came together in 1968, when Symons rushed for 1,107 yards. He was the first Boatman, ever, to top the 1,000 yard plateau. Added to this record was his CFL's Most Outstanding Player Award, again a first for any Double Blue player, and a CFL All-Star at running back. In 1969 and 1970, he shared running duties with Dave Raimey, obtained that year in a trade from Winnipeg. He gained 905 yards on the ground in 1969 and 908 in 1970. In 1971, Symons shared running back duties with Leon McQuay, when Raimey was converted to defensive back. Symons unhesitatingly turned to being a great blocking back, still gaining 418 yards in the bargain. The only thing missing was a trip to the Grey Cup, something that all Argonaut fans craved (waiting since 1952). In addition, Symons turned down an offer from the NFL's Denver Broncos (in his home state) to stay in Toronto. Unfortunately, their trip to the 59th Grey Cup ended in classic heartbreak, as the very same star, Leon McQuay, fumbled the ball deep in Calgary territory in the final minutes, a significant factor in the Argos loss. Being a blocking back, Symons' final two season saw reduced statistics, though he rushed for 235 yards in 1972 and 358 in 1973.

== Post-football career, honours and awards ==
Symons called it quits after 1973 to donate more time to his successful AFA Forest Products company. Symons also has a farm in Caledon, Ontario.

For his great performances as a running back, Symons was inducted into the Canadian Football Hall of Fame in 1997. Symons was inducted into the Ontario Sports Hall of Fame in 2015.
