= Edmonton Wildcats =

Canadian football team

Logo

General information
- Founded: 1948
- Stadium: Emerald Hills Sports Pavilion
- Headquartered: Sherwood Park, Alberta
- Colours: navy blue, white
- Website: Official website

Personnel
- General manager: Meghann Tanner
- Head coach: Kevin Wuthrich
- President: Brad Gatschene

League / conference affiliations
- Canadian Junior Football League; Prairie Football Conference

Championships
- League championships: 0; 3 (1967, 1977, 1983)

The Edmonton Wildcats (formerly the Edmonton Maple Leafs) are a Canadian football team based in Edmonton, Alberta. The Wildcats play in the Prairie Football Conference, which is part of the Canadian Junior Football League and competes for the league championship, the Canadian Bowl. The team was founded in 1948.

== History ==
The team was founded as the Edmonton Maple Leafs in 1948, as a member of the Alberta Junior Football League (which was a conference in the Canadian Junior Football League). The Maple Leafs lost the 1951 National Final to the Hamilton Tigers. 1952 marked the second appearance of the Edmonton Wildcats in the national final, resulting in a narrow loss to Windsor AKO Fratmen. In 1958 the team's colors were changed to blue and white from green and gold. Due to the construction of the Commonwealth Stadium in 1976 on the site of the old Wildcat practice field, the Wildcats took up residence at Tiger Goldstick Park in Southeast Edmonton. The team would play its regular season games at Emerald Hills Football Field. The Wildcats have been successful in three appearances in the national final. In 1967 they defeated the Burlington Braves in Regina, Saskatchewan . In 1977, the Wildcats defeated the Hamilton Hurricanes in Hamilton, Ontario and in 1983 defeated the Ottawa Sooners in Windsor, Ontario. In 1994, the team moved to its current practice field, Rundle Park. The team made it to the 2006 Canadian Bowl, but lost to the Vancouver Island Raiders. They also were runner up in the 2009 championship game.

== Gallery ==
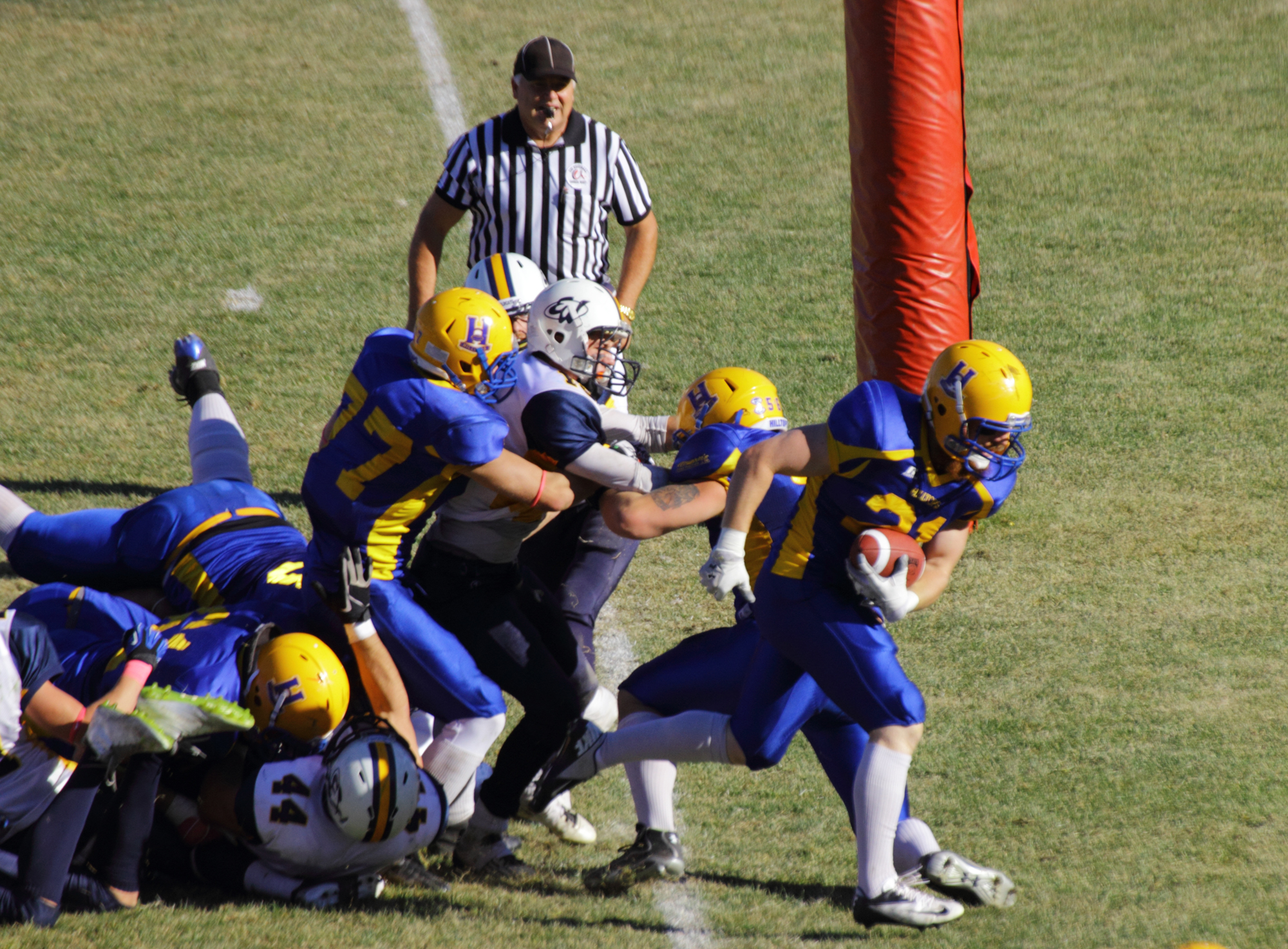
Sunday October 14, 2012 1:00 p.m. Junior Football game in the Prairie Football Conference (PFC). Canadian Junior Football League teams included Edmonton and Saskatoon. Saskatoon Hilltops were the home team at Gordie Howe Bowl home to the Saskatoon Hilltops . The game concluded at Hilltops 42-11 Wildcats. The Hilltops will continue in the playoffs advancing to the PFC Final next Sunday, October 21, 2012. The Regina Thunder defeated the Calgary Colts 24–21. Hilltops meet the Thunder at Gordie Howe Bowl. The champion of the PFC final will receive the hosting rights for the Jostens Cup. The Jostens Cup is played between the OFC Champion and PFC Champion Teams. The Jostens Cup winner goes on to play the BCFC Champion for the Canadian Bowl Championship.

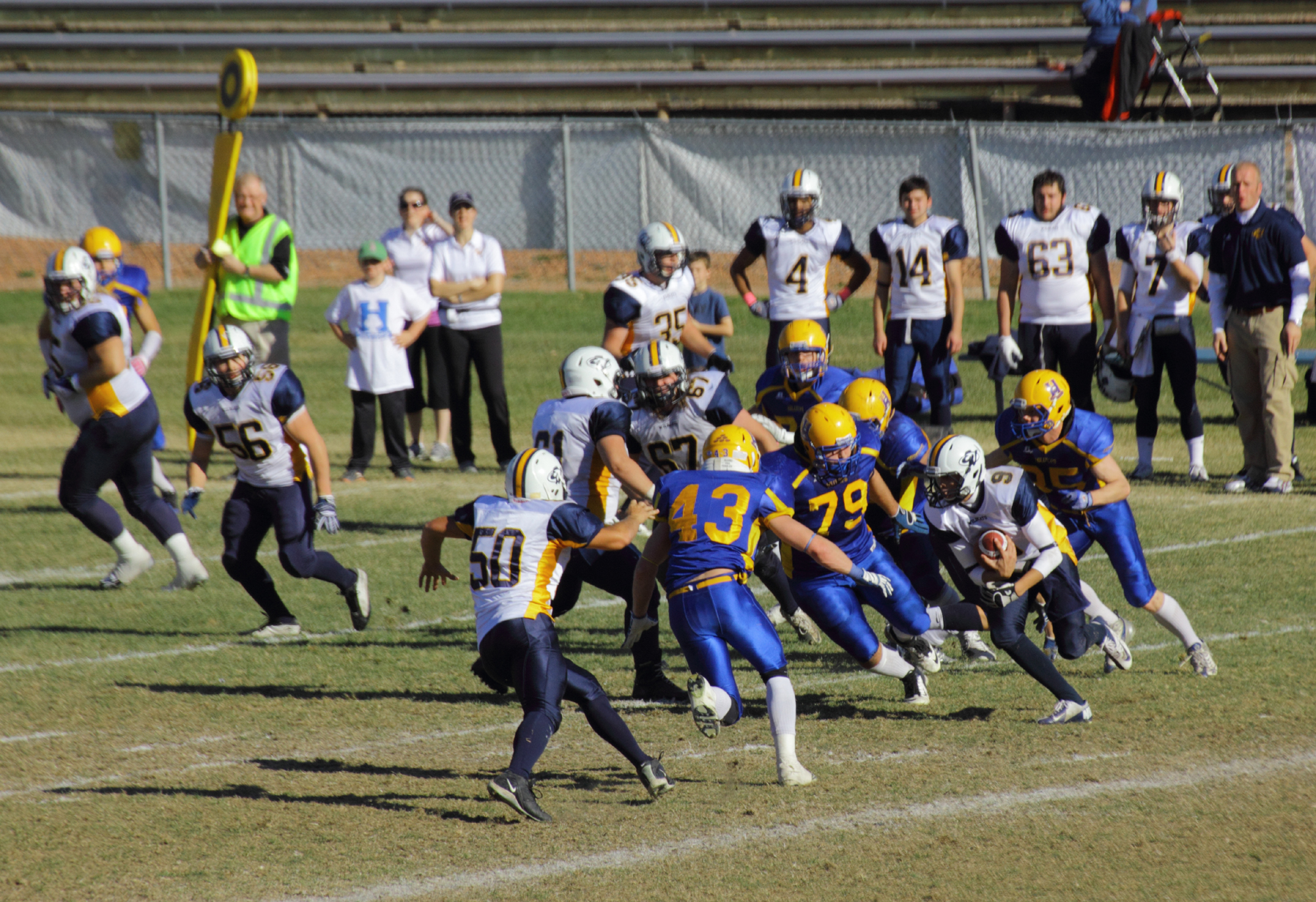
Wildcat QB Taylor Yaremchuck brought down by Hilltops Donovan Dale

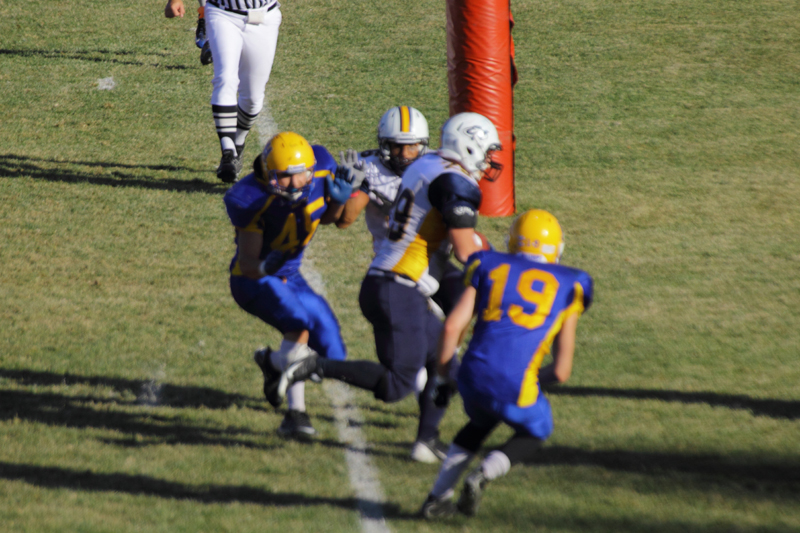
The final scoring touch down of the Semi Final Game!
