= Gary Durchik =

Canadian football coach

Biographical details
- Born: 1944 (age 81–82)

Playing career
- 1963–65: Miami (OH)
- Position: Tight end

Coaching career (HC unless noted)
- 1969–72: Chillicothe High School
- 1973: Miami Redskins (Asst.)
- 1974–78: Colorado Buffaloes (OL Coach)
- 1979: Illinois Fighting Illini (Asst.)
- 1980–83: Northern Illinois Huskies (OC)
- 1984–85: Montreal Concordes (OL Coach)
- 1985–86: Montreal Concordes/Alouettes
- 1987–90: Edmonton Eskimos (OL Coach)
- 1991–94: Hamilton Tiger-Cats (OC/OL)
- 1995–1996: Edmonton Huskies
- 1997: Edmonton Eskimos(OL Coach)
- 2002–2010: Edmonton Wildcats

Head coaching record
- Overall: 6-14 (CFL)

Accomplishments and honors

Awards
- 2006 Norm Kimball Coach of the Year Award

Gary Durchik (born 1944) is a Canadian football coach.

== Biography ==
A Hall of Fame athlete at Mentor High School, he was a tight end at Miami University from 1963 to 1965. He got his first head coaching job in 1969 at the young age of 25. He coached the Chillicothe High School Cavaliers for four seasons before returning to the Miami RedHawks in 1973 as an assistant. In his only season with the RedHawks, the team had an undefeated 11–0 season. Miami finished the year with the 17th overall ranking and defeated the Florida Gators 16–7 in the Tangerine Bowl. This season also began an 11-year relationship between head coach Bill Mallory and Durchik.

From 1974 to 1978 Durchik was Mallory's offensive line coach with the Colorado Buffaloes . In five seasons at Boulder the Buffaloes had a 35–21–1 record, appearing in two bowl games, both losses. He was an assistant coach for Gary Moeller for one year 1979 at the University of Illinois before joining forces again with Coach Mallory at Northern Illinois, where he was the Huskies offensive coordinator from 1980 to 1983. After a brief stint as interim head coach during the off-season between the 1983 and 1984 college football seasons, he was a finalist for the head coaching Job at NIU but decided to head to the Canadian Football League when Lee Corso got the head coaching job.

Durchik's next coaching position was as the offensive line coach for Montreal Concordes. Durchik replaced head coach Joe Galat for the final two games of the 1985 season, winning both. He defeated the Ottawa Rough Riders 30–20 in the East Semi-Final. He returned to coach the team (which restored the Alouettes name) to a 4–14 season the following year. The team would disband shortly after the start of the 1987 CFL season.

From 1987–1990 he was offensive line coach for the Edmonton Eskimos. In 1987, the Eskimos defeated the Toronto Argonauts 38–26 in the 75th Grey Cup. Durchik's second Grey Cup appearance as a coach was a 50–11 loss to the Winnipeg Blue Bombers in the 78th Grey Cup.

Next, Durchik was the OL coach and offensive coordinator for the Hamilton Tiger-Cats from 1991–1994. The team made the conference Semi-Finals in 1992 and 1993, both times losing to the Winnipeg Blue Bombers.

In 1995 Durchik became the head coach of the Edmonton Huskies (CJFL), whom he coached for the 1995 and 1996 seasons.

He returned to the Edmonton Eskimos in 1997 for one season as an offensive assistant.

In 2002, he was named head coach of the Edmonton Wildcats. In 2006, he led the team to the Canadian Bowl but lost to the Vancouver Island Raiders by two points due to a late field goal. He also received the Norm Kimball Coach of the Year award from Football Alberta in March 2007. In 2009, Durchik and the Wildcats made a return to the Canadian Bowl but lost to the Vancouver Island Raiders again. Durchik resigned from the Wildcats in November 2010.

Durchik has three grown children (Matt, Jennifer, and Lindsay) and four grandchildren (Kira, Jaxon, Colin and Elena).
