= Kamloops Broncos =

Minor-league Canadian football team

Logo

General information
- Founded: 2007
- Stadium: Hillside Stadium
- Headquartered: Kamloops, British Columbia
- Colours: Navy Blue, Orange, and White
- Website: Official website

Personnel
- Head coach: Braden Vankoughnett
- President: Michelle Peters

League / conference affiliations
- Canadian Junior Football League; B.C. Football Conference

The Kamloops Broncos are a Canadian Junior football team based in Kamloops, British Columbia. The Broncos play in the seven-team B.C. Football Conference (BCFC), which is part of the Canadian Junior Football League (CJFL) and competes annually for the national title in the Canadian Bowl.

The team was founded as the Kamloops Cowboys in 2000, but was relegated to non-playing status by the BCFC in 2003 when the organization was unable to pay their debts. With the new Hillside Stadium facility at Thompson Rivers University, the Broncos franchise was formally approved by the BCFC in January 2007.

== Regular season results ==
Season	Games	Won	Lost	Ties	Standing	Playoffs
2007	10	1	9	0	7th in BCFC	No
2008	10	0	10	0	7th in BCFC	No
2009	10	2	8	0	6th in BCFC	No
2010	10	3	7	0	5th in BCFC	No
2011	10	2	8	0	5th in BCFC	No
2012	10	2	8	0	5th in BCFC	No
2013	10	2	7	1	4th in BCFC	Yes
2014	10	6	4	0	3rd in BCFC	Yes
2015	10	5	5	0	4th in BCFC	Yes
2016	10	2	8	0	5th in BCFC	No
2017	10	2	8	0	5th in BCFC	No
2018	10	0	10	0	6th in BCFC	No
2019	10	0	10	0	6th in BCFC	No
2021	8	1	7	0	6th in BCFC	No
2022	10	4	6	0	5th in BCFC	No

== Notable seasons ==
2007
Inaugural season in the BCFC.

2010
In the 2010 season the franchise recorded their first ever win against the Langley Rams organization and produced their first ever CJFL All-Canadians.

2011
In 2011 the BCFC began the unbalanced schedule excluding geographical rivals.

2013
In the 2013 season the franchise recorded their first ever playoff appearance facing the Vancouver Island Raiders.

2014
In 2014 the club experienced their best season to date, going 6–4 and losing 48–46 to the heavily favored and eventual Cullen Cup Champion Langley Rams in the BCFC semi-final. The game was considered one of the best in CJFL history, the Broncos rallied from a 31–10 deficit led by the Bronco offense which amassed a record 653 yards of total offense. The Broncos also set many attendants records in 2014, recording sell-out crowds at every home game, this including an at-capacity game (over 1,000 in attendance) when they faced the Okanagan Sun on August 23, 2014.

2015
In 2015 the BCFC returned to a balanced schedule, the franchise put up one of the best offensive regular season's in CJFL history. Led by Derek Yachison, Jacob Palmarin, Devin Csincsa and Stephen Schuweiler the offense produced three 1000 yard players and broke numerous franchise, conference and league records. Yachison and Csincsa became the most productive receiving duo in CJFL history, thanks in part to the break out season of quarterback Stephen Schuweiler. Csincsa and Palmarin led the nation in receiving and rushing yards respectively, while Yachison led the nation in touchdowns, receptions and 2nd in yards behind teammate Csincsa. Yachison became the all-time BCFC record holder for receptions in a career on September 12, 2015, and finished his career 2nd all-time in CJFL history. The franchise recorded their first ever win against the Vancouver Island Raiders on August 22, 2015, in front of a sold out Hillside Stadium.

2016
2016 will mark the franchises 10th anniversary.

2019
Despite stellar play by numerous Broncos, the 2019 season became Kamloops’ second consecutive winless season. Broncos Abe Fimbo and Darby Kwan were 1–2 in BCFC defensive tackles leading to Abe Fimbo being recognized as the conference Rookie of the Year. Kamloops’ own Kaden Cook was additionally named a BCFC All Star Defensive Back

2020
The 2020 season was cancelled due to the Covid-19 Pandemic. Alumni Linebacker, Braden Vankoughnett, was appointed Head Coach.

2021
The Kamloops Broncos entered the 2021 season on a twenty-game losing streak, which continued for a further seven games. The longest losing streak in CJFL history was snapped when the Broncos beat the Westshore Rebels in the final game of the season on home turf. The Broncos, led by Coach Vankoughnett, brought in an influx of prairie players including University of Saskatchewan Huskie alumni linebacker, Avery Dunster, from Esterhazy, Saskatchewan, who was named a BCFC All Star.

2022
The Broncos began 2022 with a new board of directors and Head Coach Braden Vankoughnett returned for his 2nd year at the helm. The team opened the season with a 14–7 loss at home to the VI Raiders. They made the trip to Prince George for the Kodiaks first home game in franchise history, with the Broncos coming away with a 35–20 win to improve their record to 1–1. Their second road trip of the season saw them make a long day trip to Nanaimo for a rematch against the VI Raiders, resulting in a 35–16 Broncos win. The Broncos returned home for their second home game and took a 24–6 loss to the defending champion Langley Rams. The Broncos then had a home and home series against the Westshore Rebels, taking a 49–7 loss in Langford and then a close 32–27 loss at Hillside Stadium. Another home and home series against the PG Kodiaks were up next on the schedule and the Broncos won both, 47–17 and 14–9 respectively to return to .500 at 4–4. The Broncos needed a win against the CJFL #1 ranked Okanagan Sun to keep their playoff hopes alive and took a lead into the 4th Quarter before falling 41–24. The final game of the year was in Chilliwack against the Valley Huskers, ending in a tight 32–29 loss for the Broncos.

- WR Colton Meikle finished the 2022 season leading the BCFC in receiving yards with 853 yards. Meikle was named a BCFC All-Star.
- DB Keegan Curtis set a franchise record and led the BCFC in interceptions with nine. Curtis was named a BCFC All-Star.
- LB Avery Dunster was named a BCFC All-Star.

== Personnel ==
- Michelle Peters - Team President
- Braden Vankoughnett - Head Coach

== BCFC All-Stars & Conference Awards (as of 2010) ==
- Alex Adams, DL (2010)
- Mitch Day, LB (2010) BCFC Outstanding Linebacker
- Mark Gratton, LB (2010)
- Tyler Lee, DL (2012)
- Adam Nesbitt, DB (2012)
- Cam Brown, OL (2013,2014,2015)
- Grady Chalmers, LB (2013)
- Braden McCarthy, DL (2013)
- Jacob Palmarin, RB (2014,2015)
- Derek Yachison, WR (2014,2015) BCFC 2014 & 2015 Outstanding Receiver, BCFC 2015 Top Offensive Player
- Devin Csincsa, WR (2015)
- Stephen Schuweiler, QB (2015)
- Braden Vankoughnett, LB (2015)
- Derek Walde, OL (2015,2018)
- Jordan Angove, DB (2016) BCFC Top Defensive Back & Return Specialist
- Colby Henkel, QB (2016) BCFC & CJFL Rookie of the Year
- Kaden Cook, DB (2019)
- Abe Fimbo, LB (2019) BCFC Rookie of the Year
- Avery Dunster, LB (2021,2022)
- Colton Meikle, WR (2022, 2023, 2024, 2025)
- Keagan Kurtis, DB (2022, 2023)
- Kaleb Senz, WR (2024) BCFC 2023 & 2024 Returner & Special Teams Player of the Year

== Canadian Junior Football League First Team All-Canadians ==
- Mitch Day, LB (2010)
- Alex Adams, DL (2010)
- Derek Yachison, WR (2014 & 2015) 2015 CJFL Peter Dalla Riva Offensive Player of the Year Award Winner
- Jacob Palmarin, RB (2015)
- Devin Csincsa, WR (2015)
- Cam Brown, OL (2015)
- Jordan Angove, DB & Return Specialist (2016x2)
- Kaleb Senz, Return Specialist (2024)

== Broncos who played in the pros ==
- Derek Yachison, WR - BC Lions: Territorial Exemption (Practice Roster) 2013–2015 & Signed Player 2015–2016 / Winnipeg Blue Bombers: Signed 2017
- Colton Meikle, WR - BC Lions: Territorial Exemption (Practice Roster) 2023–Present

== Notable Bronco alumni achievements ==
- Derek Yachison, WR - Kamloops Sports Council's Male Athlete of the Year (2015) - CFL Regional Combine Invitee (2017)
- Grady Chalmers, LB - CIS Vanier Cup National Champion (2015)
- Devin Csincsa, WR - CFL Regional Combine Invitee (2016)
- Jan Antons, former General Manager - Kamloops Sports Council's Sport Person of The Year (2014)
