= Andrew Harris (Canadian football) =

Canadian gridiron football player (born 1987)

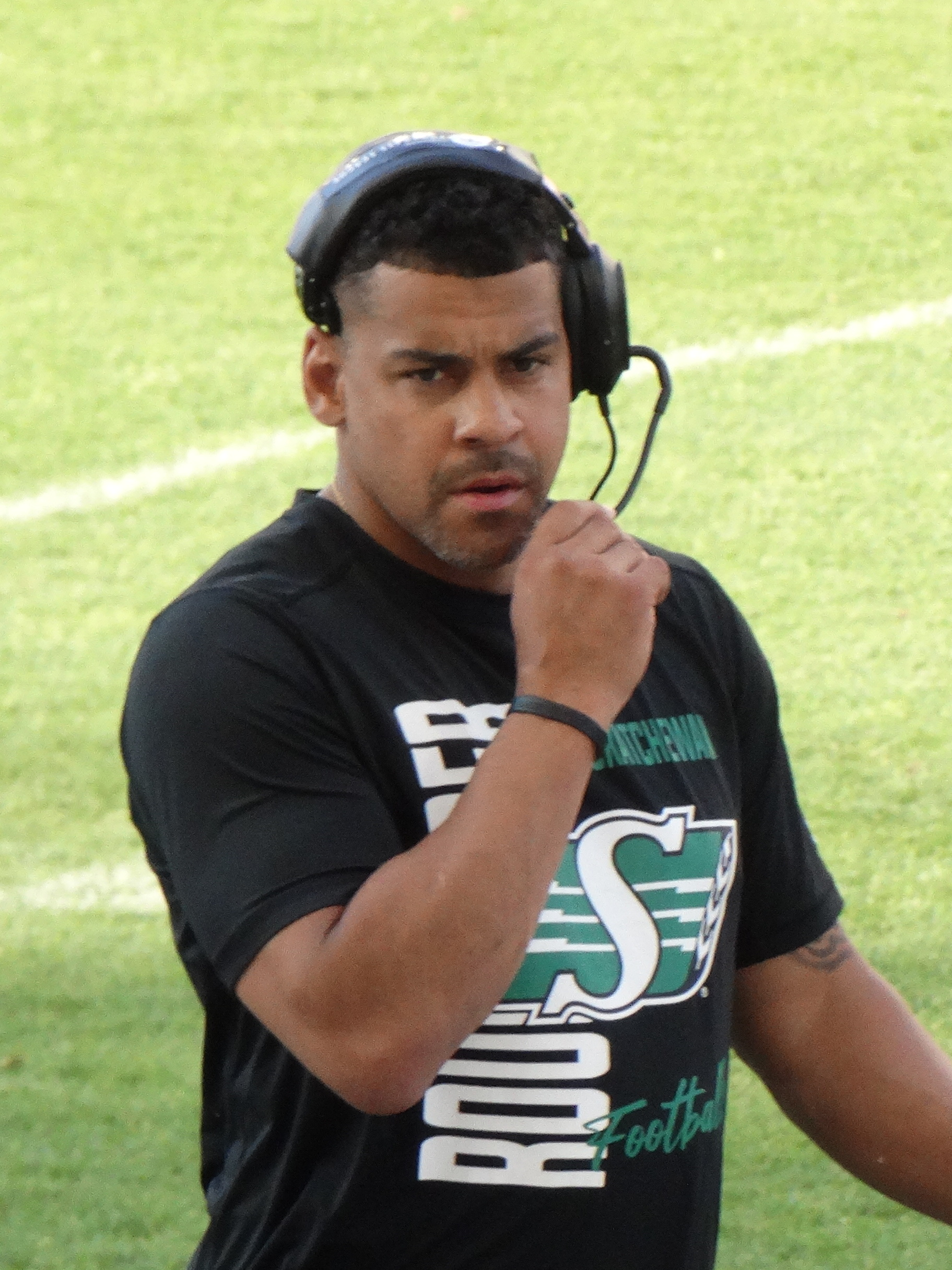
- Harris with the Saskatchewan Roughriders in 2025

Saskatchewan Roughriders
- Title: Running backs coach

Personal information
- Born: April 24, 1987 (age 39); Winnipeg, Manitoba, Canada
- Listed height: 5 ft 9 in (1.75 m)
- Listed weight: 215 lb (98 kg)

Career information
- Position: Running back (No. 33)
- CJFL: Vancouver Island Raiders (2006–2009)

Career history

Playing
- 2009–2015: BC Lions
- 2016–2021: Winnipeg Blue Bombers
- 2022–2023: Toronto Argonauts

Coaching
- 2025–present: Saskatchewan Roughriders (Running backs coach)

Operations
- 2024: Vancouver Island Raiders (Director of Football Operations)

Awards and highlights
- 5× Grey Cup champion (2011, 2019, 2021, 2022, 2025); Grey Cup Most Valuable Player (2019); 2× Grey Cup Most Valuable Canadian (2011, 2019); CFL's Most Outstanding Canadian (2017); 2× Dr. Beattie Martin Trophy (2017, 2018); 4× Eddie James Memorial Trophy (2015, 2017, 2018, 2019); 5× CFL All-Star (2012, 2015–2018); 6× CFL West All-Star (2012, 2015–2019); 3× CFL rushing yards leader (2017–2019); First-Team CFL 2010s All-Decade Team; 3× Canadian Bowl champion (2006, 2008, 2009); Wally Buono Award (2009)

Career CFL statistics
- Rushing yds: 10,380
- Rushing TDs: 51
- Receiving yds: 5,489
- Receiving TDs: 32
- Stats at CFL.ca

Andrew Harris OM (born April 24, 1987) is a Canadian former professional football running back who is the running backs coach for the Saskatchewan Roughriders of the Canadian Football League (CFL). Harris is a five-time Grey Cup champion, two-time winner of the Grey Cup Most Valuable Canadian and one-time Grey Cup Most Valuable Player, as well as a five-time CFL All-Star and a six-time CFL West All-Star. He played for the BC Lions for six seasons before joining the Winnipeg Blue Bombers in 2016 as a free agent, where he was named the 2017 Most Outstanding Canadian after leading the league in rushing and setting the record for single-season receptions by a running back. In 2022, while a member of the Toronto Argonauts, Harris passed 10,000 career rushing yards and became the CFL leader in career yards from scrimmage by a Canadian.

== Early life ==
Harris was born in Winnipeg, Manitoba, and spent his early years in Steinbach, Manitoba, where he started playing football at age 9 with the Eastman Raiders. He is of Barbadian descent through his father. He played high school football at Grant Park High School in Winnipeg through his junior year and transferred to Oak Park High School before his senior year.

== Junior career ==
After high school in Winnipeg, Harris joined the Vancouver Island Raiders of the Canadian Junior Football League. During his junior career, he led the Raiders to three national championships (2006, 2008, and 2009) and broke a number of British Columbia conference and CJFL records, including all-time touchdowns and scoring. In 2009, he was awarded the Wally Buono Award for most outstanding junior football player in Canada.

== Professional career ==
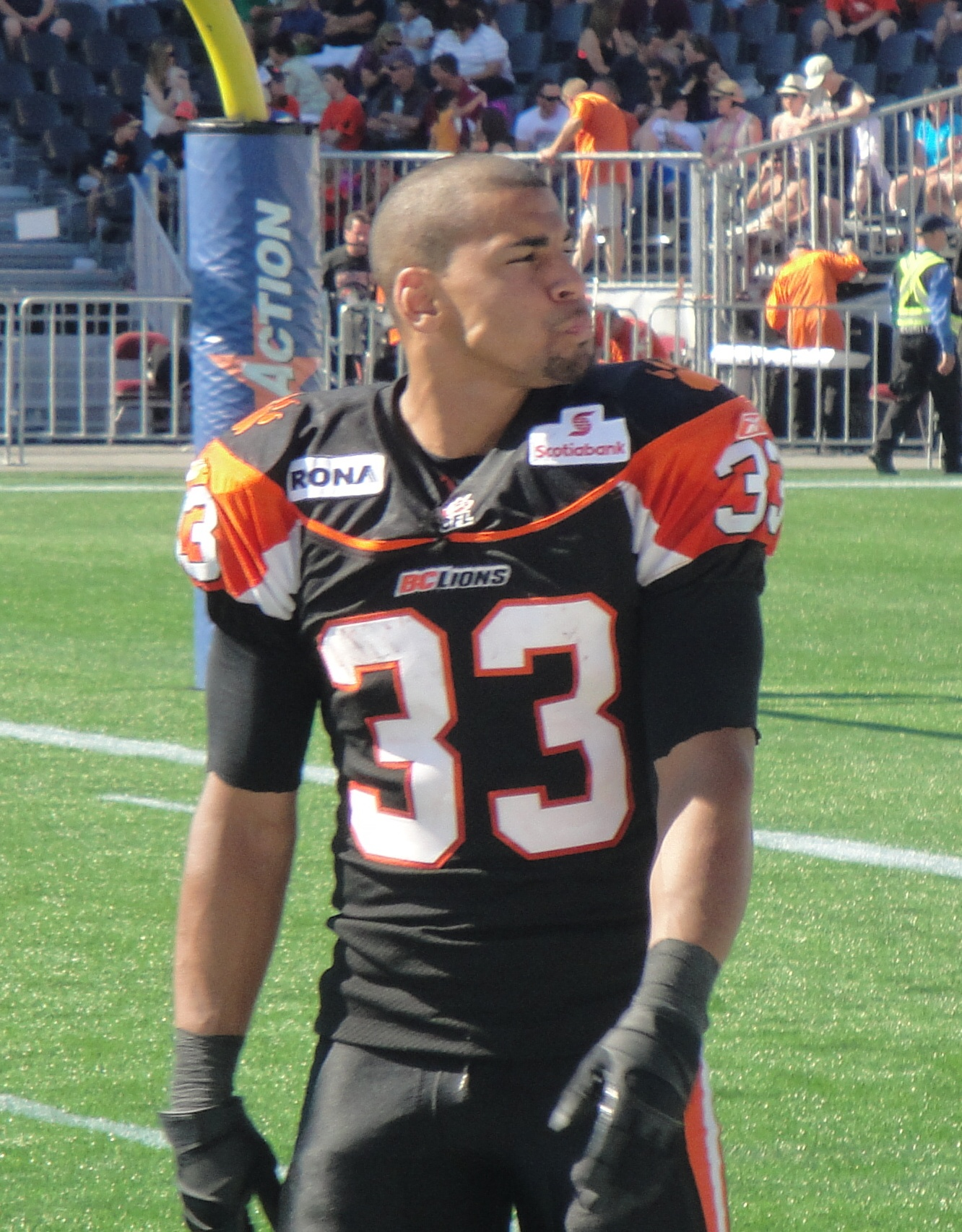
Harris with the Lions in 2011

=== BC Lions ===
The head coach and general manager of the BC Lions, Wally Buono, took notice of Harris' talents in junior football and claimed him as a territorial exemption on May 22, 2008. On December 15, 2008, the Lions announced that they had signed Harris. He joined the Lions' practice roster in 2009, while continuing to play his final season of junior for the Raiders.

==== 2010 ====
In 2010, Harris earned a spot on the Lions active roster and was primarily used on special teams in his first season. He was named the CFL's special teams player of the week on September 14, 2010.

==== 2011 ====
Harris began the 2011 season as the Lions' backup running back. Harris saw his role expand and he took over as the starting running back in mid-season, finishing with 853 total yards and eight touchdowns. In the playoffs, Harris was named the Canadian player of the week for his performance in the Lions' win over the Edmonton Eskimos in the West Division Final. A week later, Harris was named the Most Outstanding Canadian at the Grey Cup, scoring a touchdown and rushing for 65 yards over 10 carries in the Lions 34–23 win over the Winnipeg Blue Bombers.

On December 29, 2011, Harris and the Lions agreed to a two-year contract extension, with an option for year three.

==== 2012 ====
Following a strong 2011 campaign, Harris became the starting running back for the 2012 CFL season. Harris continued his strong play and became the ninth Canadian running back to rush for 1,000 yards in a season and the first Canadian BC Lion to rush for a 1,000 yards since Sean Millington in 2000. Fellow Canadian running back Jon Cornish also ran for 1,000 yards, marking the first time since 1956 that two Canadian running backs ran for 1,000 yards in the same season.

==== 2013 ====
Despite seeing increased rushing attempts in the 2013 CFL season, his total yards fell short of 1000, finishing with 998. Harris added 61 pass receptions for 513 yards. Prior to the 2014 CFL season Harris and the Lions agreed to a contract extension through the 2015 CFL season.

==== 2014 ====
In week 3 against Saskatchewan, Harris registered 203 yards from scrimmage (138 rushing and 65 receiving), and scored a 58 yard rushing touchdown. The Lions won the game 26-13, their first win of the season.

Harris' campaign was cut short by a separated left ankle, which required surgery. He missed the final six regular season games as well as the team's crossover East Semi-Final loss in Montreal. In 12 games, Harris accumulated 652 yards on 122 carries (5.3 average) with two rushing touchdowns, and added 529 receiving yards on 46 catches with four touchdowns.

==== 2015 ====
Harris finished the 2015 CFL season with the second most rushing yards, trailing Montreal's Tyrell Sutton by 20 yards (1,059 to 1,039). He set a career-high in rushing attempts with 222, while simultaneously posting a career worst 4.7 yards per carry. Immediately following playoff elimination as a pending free-agent, Harris expressed his displeasure with the BC Lions organization, putting his future with the club in doubt.

=== Winnipeg Blue Bombers ===
==== 2016 ====
Harris signed with his hometown Winnipeg Blue Bombers as a free agent on February 9, 2016. During the 2016 season Harris played in all but 3 of the regular season games for the Blue Bombers, missing some time with an ankle injury. He finished the season third in the league in rushing yards, falling short of the 1,000 yard plateau by only 26 yards. The Blue Bombers qualified for the playoffs for the first time since losing the Grey Cup to Harris' B.C. Lions in 2011. In the West Semi-Final, Winnipeg played against Harris' former team at B.C. Place, but were defeated 32-31.

==== 2017 ====
In week 6, Winnipeg hosted Montreal, and was trailing by 12 points with less than two minutes remaining in the game. The Blue Bombers came back to win the game with two touchdowns, the second of which was Harris scoring from one yard out on the final play of the game.

In a week 9 game against the undefeated Edmonton Eskimos, Harris set a professional first by surpassing 100 yards in both rushing and receiving, netting a total of 225 yards in the game. Winnipeg defeated Edmonton 33-26.

Harris finished the season with 1,035 rushing yards, winning his first league rushing title. He also led all players with the most receptions, with 105, which was also a record for running backs, with the previous record of 102 held by Craig Ellis. The Blue Bombers finished 12-6, and hosted their first playoff game since 2011, but were defeated in that game by Edmonton 39-32.

==== 2018 ====
Harris's strong play was rewarded in May 2018 when he and the Bombers agreed to a two-year contract extension. In 2018, he set a career-high for rushing yards and once again led the league in rushing with 1390 yards. In the West Semi-Final in Saskatchewan, Harris rushed for 153 yards and a fourth quarter touchdown en route to the Blue Bombers' 23-18 victory, the team's first playoff win since the 2011 East Final. In the West Final, the host Calgary Stampeders defeated the Blue Bombers 22-14.

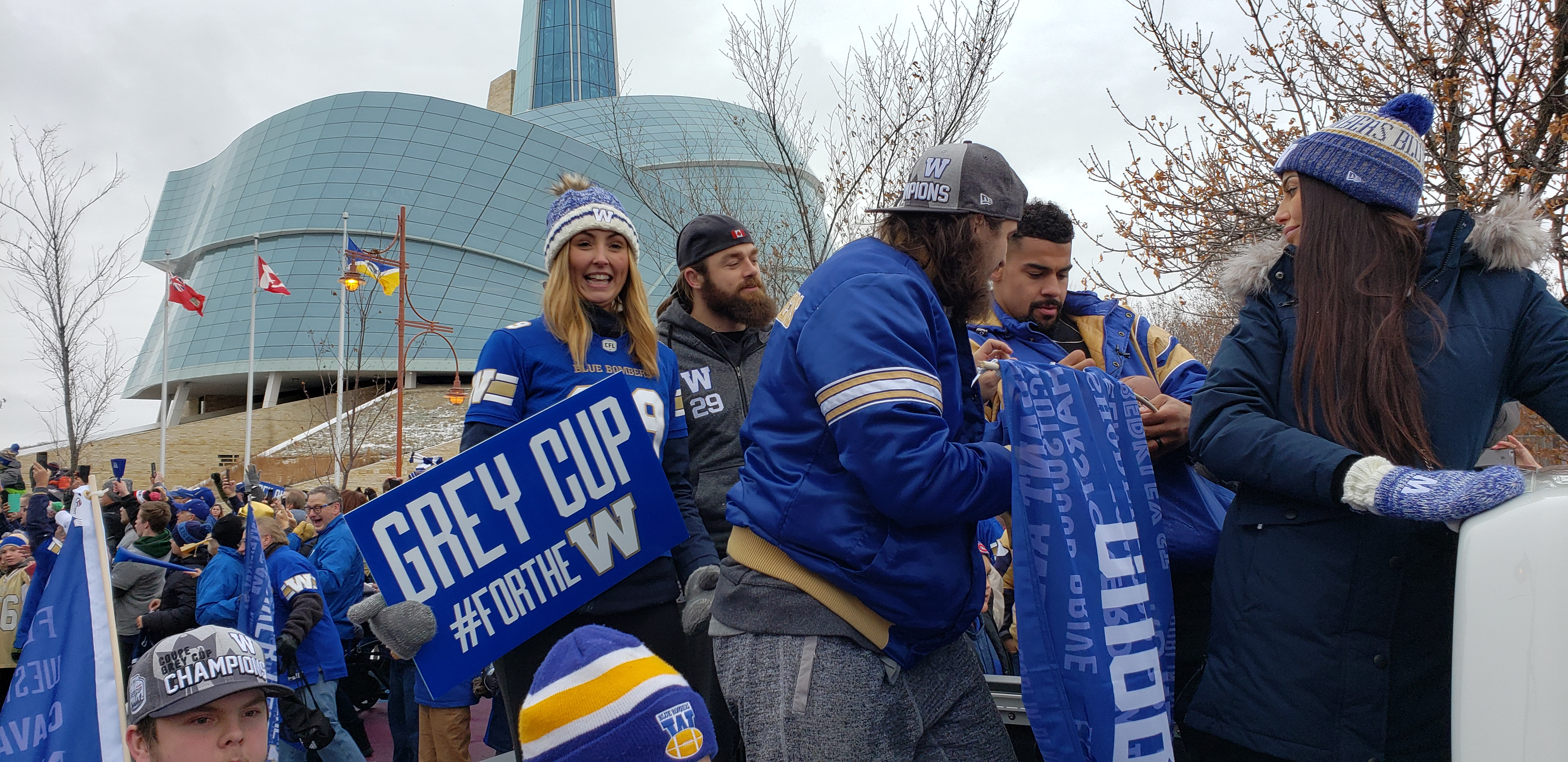
Harris with his wife (right) and Jeff Hecht at the 2019 Grey Cup parade in Winnipeg

==== 2019 ====
During the 2019 CFL season, Harris surpassed the 8,000 rushing yard mark for his career, in a game against the Argonauts at home. On August 15, 2019, Harris became the all-time leader in yards from scrimmage by a Canadian player, surpassing Ben Cahoon's 13,368 yards from scrimmage. In the same game, he passed Dave Thelen and entered the top ten all-time in rushing yards. Harris is the only player in league history to record over 4000 rushing yards with two different teams. On August 26, 2019 Harris was suspended two games by the league for violating the CFL/CFLPA drug policy after testing positive for Metandienone. In Winnipeg's final regular season game, Harris broke the record previously held by Normie Kwong for career rushing yards by a Canadian player in the CFL; the play on which he broke the record set up Winnipeg's game winning field goal over Calgary.

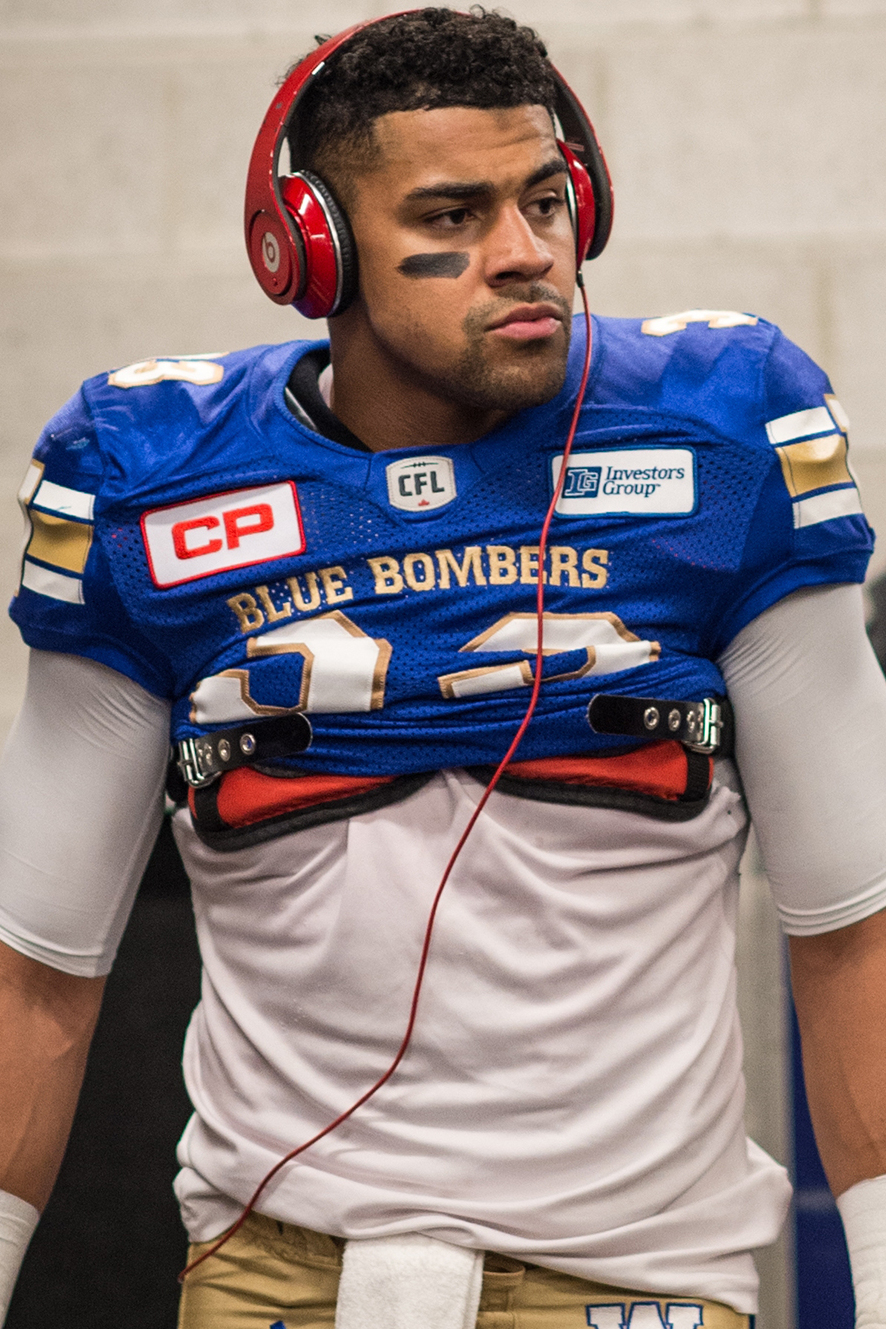
Harris with the Blue Bombers in 2016

Despite winning the CFL rushing title by more than 300 yards Harris was not selected as a team nominee for either Most Outstanding Player (Willie Jefferson), or Most Outstanding Canadian (Mike Miller). Miller's nomination caused controversy; as mostly a special teams player, Miller's statistical output was far below Harris's. Miller was the team co-leader for special teams tackles with 25, and with only 10 yards rushing and 63 yards receiving, Miller was outgained by Harris in terms of yards from scrimmage by a combined 1,836 yards. Miller himself stated his belief that Harris was the best Canadian player on the Blue Bombers by writing, “I will accept the Canadian nomination on Andrew’s behalf, but do so reluctantly and while completely disagreeing with his omission.” Voter Ted Wyman wrote a piece stating that Harris's positive test for a banned substance prevented Wyman from giving Harris a vote. Meanwhile, Bob Irving, a local radio announcer and the lone voter for Harris defended him; “I believe that a 2-game suspension, 2 missed game cheques and public embarrassment in July was punishment enough—I proudly voted for him.”

Harris helped the underdog Blue Bombers win their first Grey Cup since 1990 against the Hamilton Tiger-Cats in the 107th Grey Cup game. He became the first ever player to win Most Valuable Player and Most Valuable Canadian in Grey Cup history after he recorded 18 carries for 134 rushing yards, five catches for 35 receiving yards, and both a rushing touchdown and a receiving touchdown. Following the win of his hometown team Harris said "I'm so proud to be a Winnipegger and I can't wait to get back and share this with all them. I just wanted to prove it to my teammates and deliver for them. Everything else, whatever. I just wanted to be the best player I could be today."

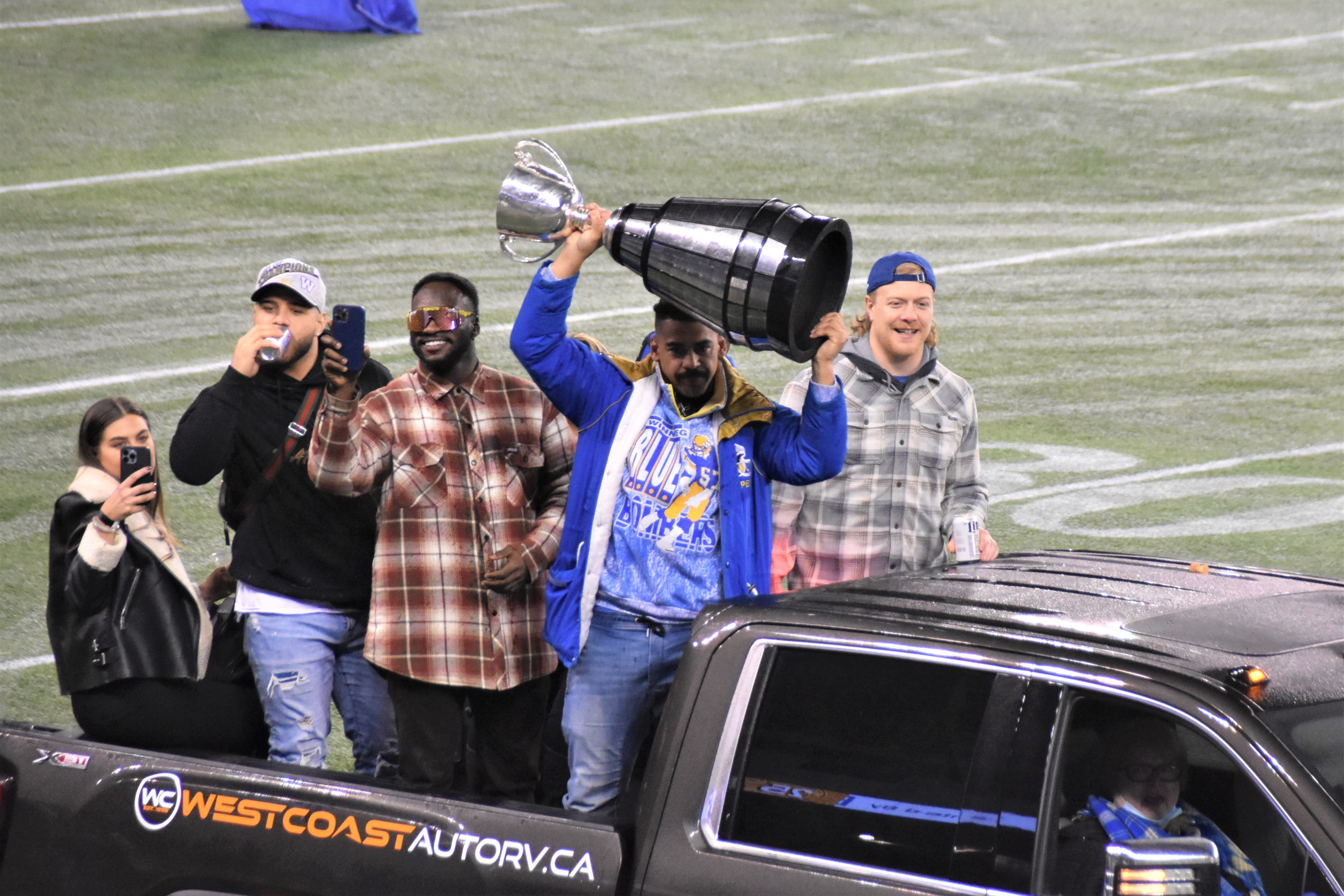
Harris raises the Grey Cup at Winnipeg's 2021 Grey Cup celebration at IG Field

==== 2020 ====
Harris did not play in 2020 as the 2020 CFL season was cancelled due to the COVID-19 pandemic.

==== 2021 ====
On January 15, 2021, it was announced that Harris had signed a one-year contract extension with the Blue Bombers. Harris missed the first three games of the season with a calf injury. He played in six games in the middle of the regular season, carrying the ball 116 times for 623 yards with three touchdowns. On October 22, 2021 the Bombers announced that they had placed Harris on the six-game injured list because of a knee injury he suffered when he scored a touchdown against the Edmonton Elks. Harris would not play for the rest of season until the 2021 Western Division Finals. In the West Division Finals, Harris carried the team to their second consecutive Grey Cup appearance as he had 136 yards rushing and a TD as the Bombers ended the Roughriders year for the third consecutive season. The Blue Bombers would once again defeat Hamilton in the Grey Cup, this time in Hamilton's home stadium, 33-25 in overtime.

Harris became a free agent upon the expiry of his contract on February 8, 2022.

=== Toronto Argonauts ===
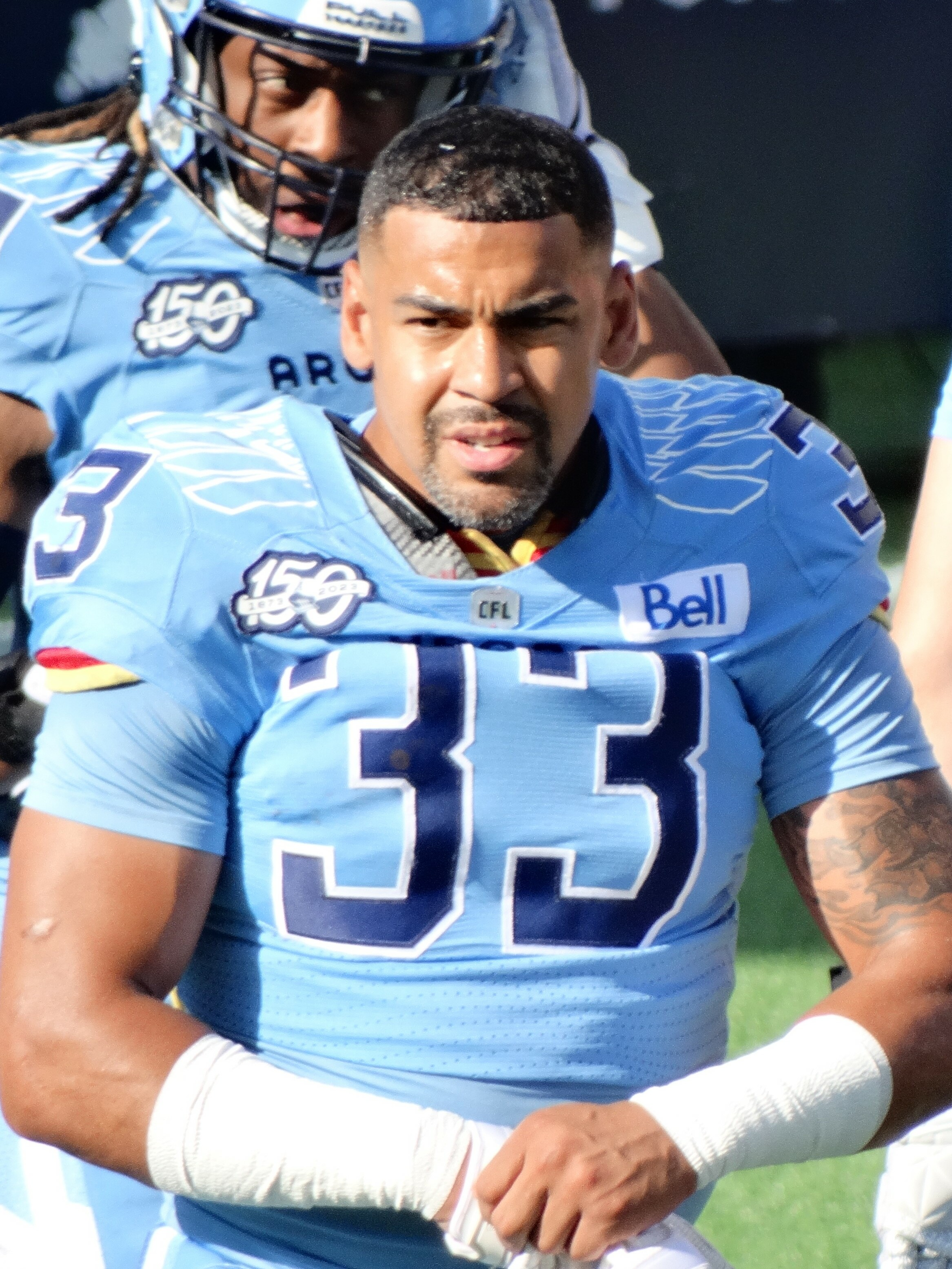
Harris with the Argonauts in 2023

==== 2022 ====
On February 8, 2022, Harris agreed to terms with the Toronto Argonauts after spending six seasons with the Winnipeg Blue Bombers. In his fifth game with the Argonauts, on July 24, 2022, he became the sixth player in CFL history to rush for over 10,000 yards and is the only Canadian player to accomplish the feat. On August 16, 2022, mid-way through the 2022 season, it was initially announced that Harris would be out for the next 4–6 weeks with a torn pectoral muscle, however the following day it was announced he would miss the remainder of the season after undergoing surgery. At the time of the injury, Harris had played in eight games for the Argos and was third in the league in rushing yards with 490. Harris returned to the active roster in the East Division Final vs. the Montreal Alouettes and scored his first touchdown with the Argonauts. One week later, Harris helped Toronto win the 109th Grey Cup by defeating his former team, the Blue Bombers.

==== 2023 ====
On March 2, 2023, it was announced that Harris had re-signed with the Argonauts. He began the season as the backup running back, but still saw significant playing time. On July 29, 2023, he surpassed Charles Roberts as the CFL's fifth all-time leader rusher. He finished the regular season on the six-game injured list, but still played in 12 regular season games where he had 49 carries for 229 yards and two touchdowns along with 10 receptions for 86 yards and one touchdown. He returned for the team's East Final playoff game, where he had two carries for four yards, but the Argonauts were defeated by the Alouettes.

Harris' contract with the Argonauts expired on February 13, 2024.

=== Retirement ===
On April 24, 2024, the Blue Bombers announced that Harris would sign a one-day contract to officially retire as a member of his hometown Winnipeg Blue Bombers. Harris officially signed his ceremonial contract with Blue Bombers President and CEO Wade Miller on the night of April 27th at The Met in Winnipeg prior to the red-carpet premiere for the documentary of Harris' life, ‘Running Back Relentless’. Harris was also honoured during halftime on June 21, 2024 when the Blue Bombers hosted the B.C. Lions.

== CFL career statistics ==
Legend
*	Led the league
≈	Won the Grey Cup
±	Grey Cup MVP
**Bold**	Career high

=== Regular season ===
Year	Team	Games		Rushing					Receiving			
Year	Team	GP	GS	Att	Yards	Avg	TD	Long	Rec	Yards	Avg	TD
2010	BC	18	0	0	0	0	0	0	0	0	0	0
2011	BC≈	18	11	96	458	4.8	1	32	30	395	**13.1**	**7**
2012	BC	18	18	187	1112	6.0	7	**61**	75	718	9.6	5
2013	BC	18	18	198	998	5.0	7	25	61	513	8.4	4
2014	BC	12	12	122	652	5.3	2	58	46	529	11.5	4
2015	BC	18	18	222*	1039	4.7	**8***	33	53	584	11.0	2
2016	WPG	15	15	195	974	5.0	4	29	67	631	9.4	1
2017	WPG	18	18	189	1035*	5.5	6	26	**105**	**857**	8.2	1
2018	WPG	18	18	**239**	**1390***	5.8	**8**	43	64	451	7.8	3
2019	WPG≈±	16	16	225*	1380*	**6.1**	4	56	70	529	7.6	4
2020	WPG	Season cancelled										
2021	WPG≈	7	7	116	623	5.4	3	24	11	116	10.5	1
2022	TOR≈	8	8	114	490	4.3	0	19	23	180	7.8	0
2023	TOR	12	0	49	229	4.7	2	13	10	86	8.6	1
CFL totals		196	159	1,952	10,380	5.3	51	61	609	5,489	9.1	32

=== Playoffs ===
Year	Team	Games		Rushing			Receiving		
Year	Team	GP	GS	Att	Yards	TD	Rec	Yards	TD
2010 West Semi-Final	BC	1	0	0	-	-	0	-	-
2011 West Final	BC	1	1	7	41	**1**	3	29	**1**
2012 West Final	BC	1	1	8	33	0	**10**	**75**	0
2013 West Semi-Final	BC	1	1	10	93	0	2	21	0
2014 East Semi-Final*	BC	0	-	-	-	-	-	-	-
2015 West Semi-Final	BC	1	1	14	79	0	3	28	0
2016 West Semi-Final	WPG	1	1	11	61	**1**	4	27	0
2017 West Semi-Final	WPG	1	1	11	77	0	4	43	0
2018 West Semi-Final	WPG	1	1	19	**153**	**1**	2	10	0
2018 West Final	WPG	1	1	13	71	0	4	9	0
2019 West Semi-Final	WPG	1	1	14	57	0	2	10	0
2019 West Final	WPG	1	1	10	41	0	2	8	0
2021 West Final	WPG	1	1	**23**	136	**1**	1	9	0
2022 East Final	TOR	1	1	9	42	**1**	1	30	0
2023 East Final	TOR	1	0	2	4	0	0	-	-
CFL totals		14	12	151	888	5	38	299	1

*team qualified for playoff crossover

=== Grey Cup ===
Year	Team	Games		Rushing			Receiving		
Year	Team	GP	GS	Att	Yards	TD	Rec	Yards	TD
2011	BC	1	1	10	65	**1**	1	6	0
2019	WPG	1	1	**18**	**134**	**1**	**5**	**35**	**1**
2021	WPG	1	1	**18**	80	0	2	3	0
2022	TOR	1	1	10	55	0	1	14	0
CFL totals		4	4	56	334	2	9	58	1

== Executive career ==
On February 11, 2023, it was announced that Harris had accepted a position as the head of football operations and head coach for the Vancouver Island Raiders for the 2024 season, after his playing career had ended. However, on January 24, 2024, the Raiders announced that Harris had accepted a position on the board of directors while remaining the director of football operations. The team's interim head coach from 2023, Shawn Arabsky, was instead named the head coach for 2024.

== Coaching career ==
On January 20, 2025, it was announced that Harris had been hired as the running backs coach for the Saskatchewan Roughriders.

== Honours ==
In 2026, he was appointed to the Order of Manitoba, the province’s highest honour.

== Personal ==
Harris cites his idols as former Winnipeg Blue Bombers running back Charles Roberts, and hockey player Steve Yzerman. Throughout his professional career, Harris wore #33 as a tribute to a Vancouver Island Raiders teammate who died in a car crash in September 2008. Harris has a daughter and continues to make Winnipeg his home during the off-season.

On July 5th, 2024 Harris signed a contract with the Tillsonburg Thunder of the Western Ontario Super Hockey League, a Senior AA men’s hockey league with teams ranging from Richmond Hill to Tilbury Ontario.

Awards and achievements
Preceded by Cassidy Doneff	Wally Buono Award; 2009	Succeeded by Kleevens Jean-Louis
