= Kelon Thomas =

Canadian gridiron football player (born 2000)

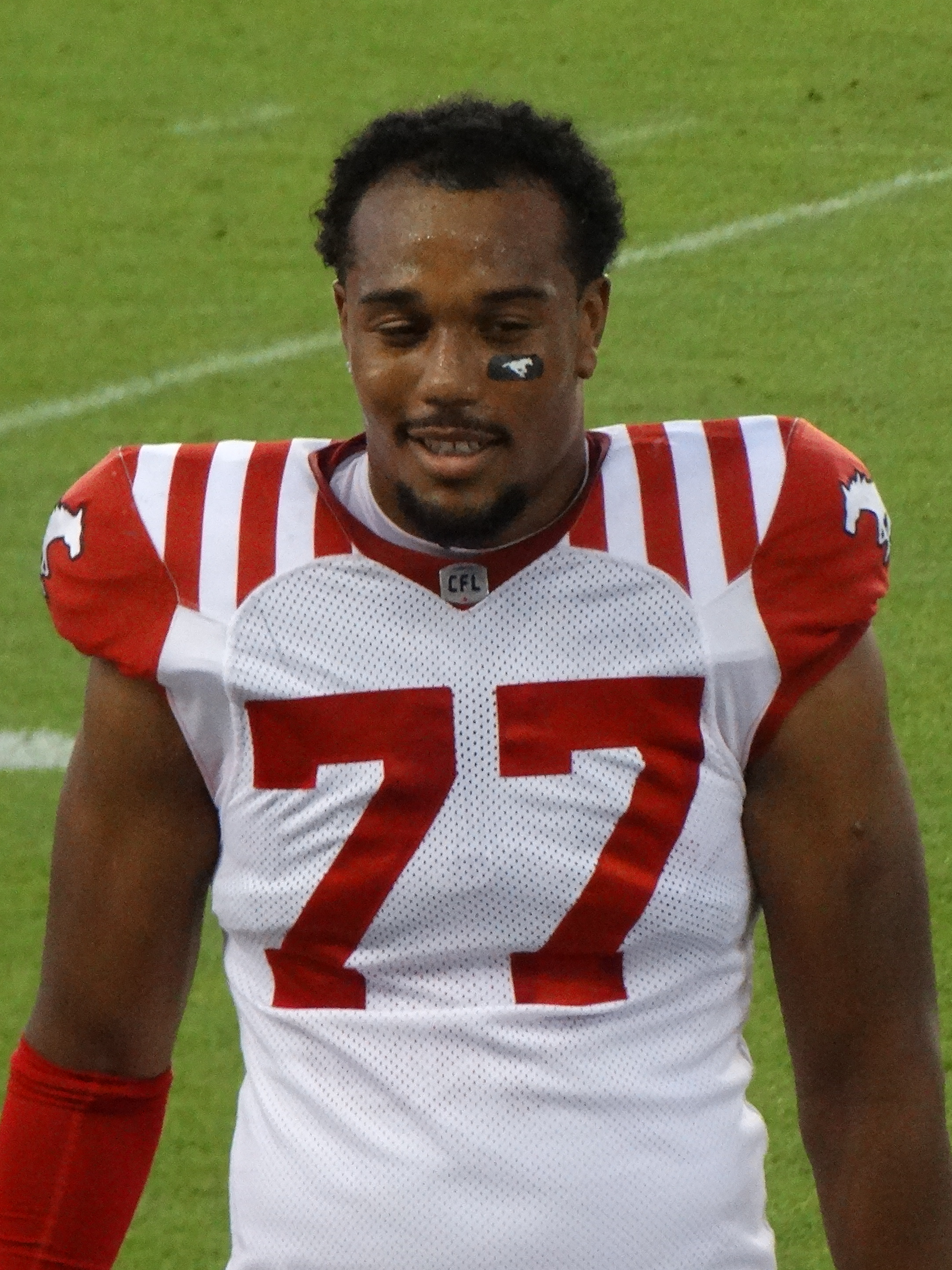
- Thomas with the Calgary Stampeders in 2024

No. 77 – Calgary Stampeders
- Position: Defensive lineman
- Roster status: Active
- CFL status: National

Personal information
- Born: December 16, 2000 (age 25); Scarborough, Ontario, Canada
- Listed height: 6 ft 4 in (1.93 m)
- Listed weight: 240 lb (109 kg)

Career information
- High school: Jean Vanier Catholic
- CJFL: Okanagan Sun

Career history
- 2023–present: Calgary Stampeders

Awards and highlights
- Canadian Bowl champion (2022)
- Stats at CFL.ca

Kelon Thomas (born December 16, 2000) is a Canadian professional football defensive lineman for the Calgary Stampeders of the Canadian Football League (CFL).

== Junior career ==
Thomas played for the Okanagan Sun of the Canadian Junior Football League (CJFL) from 2021 to 2022. In 2022, he was named the outstanding defensive lineman for the B.C. Football Conference as he played in ten regular season games where he recorded 19.5 tackles, 11.5 sacks, two forced fumbles, one fumble recovery and one blocked kick. He also played in the 2022 Canadian Bowl where he had 2.5 tackles an 1.5 sacks in the team's championship victory over the Regina Thunder.

== Professional career ==
Thomas was signed by the Calgary Stampeders on January 9, 2023. He made the team's active roster following training camp in 2023 and made his professional debut on June 8, 2023, against the BC Lions. He played in 15 regular season games in 2023 where he had one defensive tackle and 12 special teams tackles.
