= Doug Hocking =

Profile
- Position: Linebacker

Personal information
- Born: October 16, 1969 (age 57); Sarnia, Ontario

Career history
- 1991–1994: British Columbia Lions
- 1995–2002: Winnipeg Blue Bombers

Doug Hocking (born October 16, 1969, in Sarnia, Ontario) was a star linebacker who played twelve seasons in the CFL for the BC Lions and the Winnipeg Blue Bombers.

== High school and college career ==
Hocking played four seasons in the Canadian Junior Football League for the Surrey Rams.

== Canadian Football League career ==
Hocking would play 12 years with the BC Lions and Winnipeg Blue Bombers, from 1991 to 2002.

== Post-playing career ==
He was the football coach of the Winnipeg Rifles of the CJFL for the 2003 season. He then moved on to be the defensive coordinator of the Vancouver Island Raiders, a position he held until the end of the 2011 season. For the 2012 season, he joined the coaching staff of the UBC Thunderbirds, under defensive co-ordinator Jerome Erdman and head coach Shawn Olson.
