= Saskatoon Hilltops =

Junior Canadian football team

Logo

General information
- Founded: 1947
- Stadium: Saskatoon Minor Football Field at Gordon Howe Park
- Headquartered: Saskatoon, Saskatchewan
- Colours: Royal blue, gold
- Website: Official website

Personnel
- General manager: Kim Wudrick
- Head coach: Tom Sargeant

League / conference affiliations
- Canadian Junior Football League; Prairie Football Conference

Championships
- League championships: 0; 24

The Saskatoon Hilltops are a junior Canadian football team based in Saskatoon, Saskatchewan. The Hilltops play in the six-team Prairie Football Conference, which is part of the Canadian Junior Football League (CJFL) and compete annually for the Canadian Bowl. The team was founded in 1921 as a senior team in the Saskatchewan Rugby Football Union, which it played in until 1936. Two years after WWII the team reorganized in 1947. Beginning in 1953, the Hilltops have won 24 Canadian Bowl championships. The Hilltops won six consecutive Canadian Bowls between 2014 and 2019.

== Playing field ==
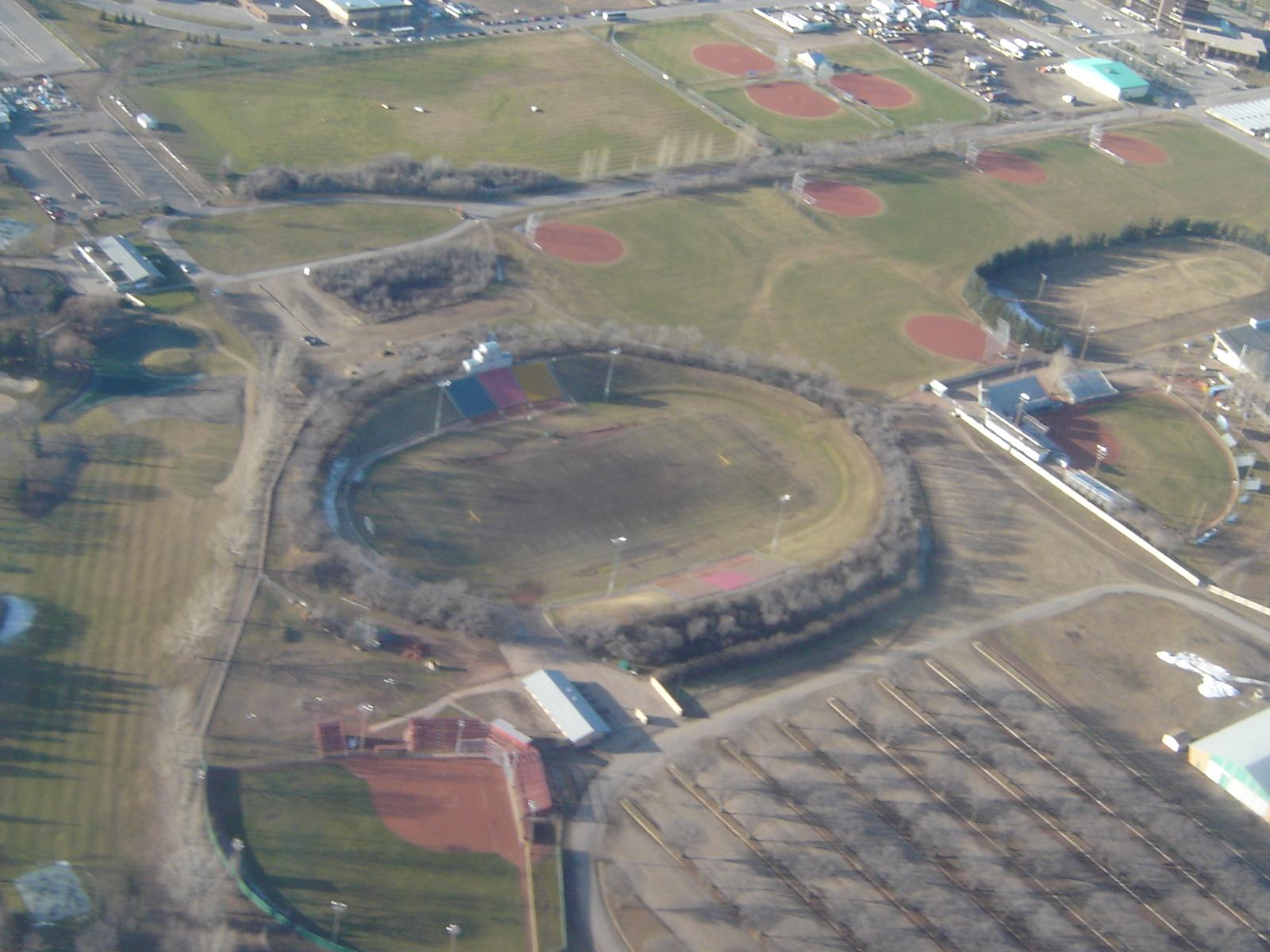
Home field of the Saskatoon Hilltops

The Hilltops play their home games on the Saskatoon Minor Football Field at Gordie Howe Sports Complex, and practice at Kilburn Park in the Buena Vista neighbourhood.

== Recent history ==
=== 2014 season ===
The Hilltops entered the playoffs atop the conference with 6 wins and 2 losses. On October 19, 2014, they won their first playoff game in a 43-13 victory over the Winnipeg Rifles.

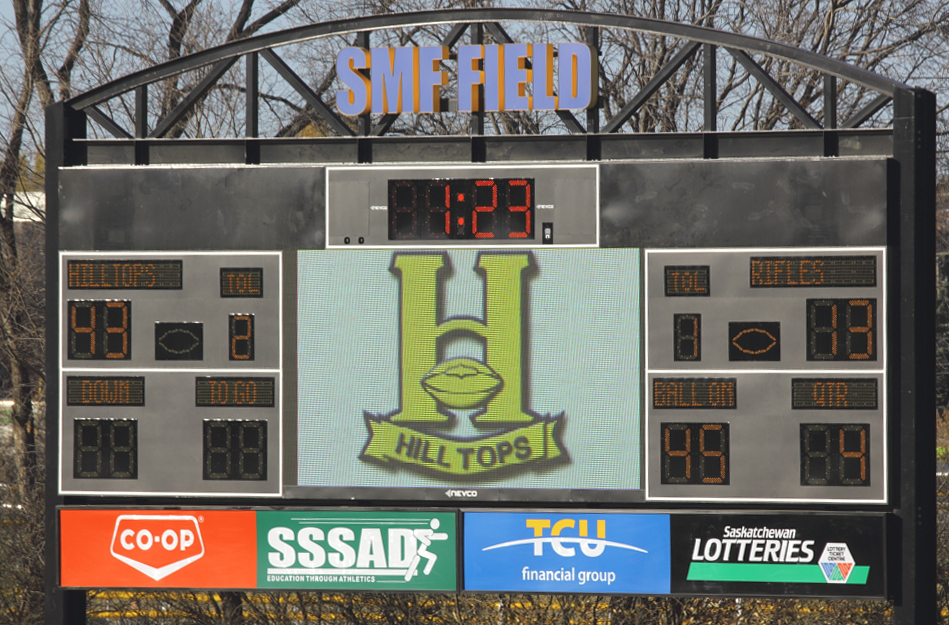
Final score on the scoreboard at a playoff game between the Winnipeg Rifles and Saskatoon Hilltops on October 19, 2014, at the Saskatoon Minor Football Field

The Hilltops advanced to the Prairie Football Conference finals on Sunday October 26, 2014, defeating the Calgary Colts 27–7 at Saskatoon Minor Football Field. On Nov 8, 2014, the Hilltops completed their successful playoff run with a victory over the Langley Rams at MacLeod Stadium with a final score of 39–14. This was the first of six consecutive Canadian Bowls.

=== 2017 and 2018 record-breaking seasons ===
The Hilltops entered the 2017 season having completed their third "threepeat": the first being three consecutive Canadian Bowl Championships in 2001, 2002 and 2003; the second 2010, 2011 and 2012; and the most recent 2014, 2015 and 2016. Only three other teams in Canadian Bowl history had the opportunity to win four championships in a row: the Regina Rams (1993, 1994 and 1995); the Edmonton Huskies (1962, 1963 and 1964); and the Montreal AAAs (1925, 1926 and 1927). The Hilltops only loss during the 2017 season came mid-season, in the last two minutes 29–26 at the hands of the Regina Thunder. Their final regular season win over the undefeated Edmonton Huskies earned the Hilltops a matching 7–1 record, but the head-to-head victory gave the Hilltops first place in the PFC and home field advantage for three consecutive playoff games.

The Hilltops defeated the Winnipeg Rifles and the Regina Thunder before managing a convincing 48–0 win over the Vancouver Island Raiders to make it to their fourth consecutive Canadian Bowl, which was played on Nov 11th in Windsor against the Windsor AKO Fratmen, the oldest CJFL team in continuous operation. The Hilltops emerged victorious in this historic game, winning 56–11, finally achieving the "fourpeat".

The Hilltops completed the 2018 regular season with a perfect 8–0 record scoring 402 points while yielding only 70. Throughout the entire regular season the Hilltops trailed only once, in the fifth game 17–16 to the Regina Thunder with 2:28 left in the first half, regaining the lead before the half ended, and going on to a 48–24 victory. In the playoffs, the Hilltops silenced the Winnipeg Rifles 58–5 and defeated the Edmonton Huskies 28-9.

The 111th Canadian Bowl championship game was played in Saskatoon on November 17, between the Hilltops and the British Columbia Football Conference Champion Langley Rams. The Hilltops led from start to finish with a balanced passing and running attack, winning 58-21. The Hilltops finished the season with a perfect 11-0 record, outscoring the opposing teams 546-105; and Head Coach Tom Sargeant also claimed his 12th Canadian Bowl championship.

=== 2019 season ===
The Hilltops finished the season with a perfect 12-0 record, defeating the Langley Rams 11-6 in a hard fought defensive struggle for the Canadian Bowl at MacLeod Stadium in Langley. In getting to the championship game they beat the London Beefeaters 51-1 in the Interprovincial playoff, the Edmonton Huskies 30 - 14 in the Prairie Conference Final, and the Edmonton Wildcats 31 - 7 in the semi-final. The Toppers finished the regular season with a perfect record, but had to mount 4th quarter comebacks against the Edmonton Huskies and the Regina Thunder. At the end of the 2019 season 15 players graduated from the Hilltops. among them ten PFC all-stars, five of whom were named CJFL all-stars. Two Hilltops won CJFL Outstanding Player Awards.

=== 2020 season cancelled due to Covid-19 pandemic ===
On June 8, 2020, CFJL commissioner announced the season was cancelled due to the COVID-19 pandemic. On resumption of play, the Langley Rams won the Canadian Bowl in 2021 and the Okanagan Sun won in 2022.

=== 2023 Champions again ===
On Remembrance Day in 2023 the Saskatoon Hilltops won a hard fought victory 17-10 over the Westshore Rebels on a cold rainy day. The championship was contested by undefeated teams. The Westshore Rebels came with a high powered offense that averaged more than 50 points per game against the stingy defense of the Saskatoon Hilltops that only yielded 6 points per game. The Hilltops prevailed, winning its 23rd national championship finishing the season with a record of 12–0.

== Canadian Junior Football League Championships ==
The Hilltops have won 24 of the 27 Canadian Junior Football Championship Games they have played in, the most recent being the 2025 Canadian Bowl versus the Okanagan Sun. Throughout the 2017, 2018 and 2019 seasons combined, the Hilltops lost only one game, in mid-season of 2017. Finishing their 2023 season at 12-0, the Hilltops completed their sixth perfect season in team history, before Covid-19, going 12–0 in 2019, 11–0 in 2018, 12-0 in 2003, 12-0 in 1978, and 11-0 in 1958. They won eight Canadian Bowls during the 2010s.

=== Canadian Bowl Championships ===
Year	Champion	Finalists
1991	Saskatoon Hilltops 48	Ottawa Sooners 7
1996	Saskatoon Hilltops 38	Windsor AKO Fratmen 7
2001	Saskatoon Hilltops 45	Okanagan Sun 11
2002	Saskatoon Hilltops 20	St. Leonard Cougars 18
2003	Saskatoon Hilltops 59	Victoria Rebels 0
2007	Saskatoon Hilltops 26	St. Leonard Cougars 3
2010	Saskatoon Hilltops 34	Vancouver Island Raiders 23
2011	Saskatoon Hilltops 29	Hamilton Hurricanes 1
2012	Saskatoon Hilltops 23	Langley Rams 21
2014	Saskatoon Hilltops 39	Langley Rams 14
2015	Saskatoon Hilltops 38	Okanagan Sun 24
2016	Saskatoon Hilltops 37	Westshore Rebels 25
2017	Saskatoon Hilltops 56	Windsor AKO Fratmen 11
2018	Saskatoon Hilltops 58	Langley Rams 21
2019	Saskatoon Hilltops 11	Langley Rams 6
2023	Saskatoon Hilltops 17	Westshore Rebels 10
2025	Saskatoon Hilltops 21	Okanagan Sun 18

=== Armadale Cup Championships ===
Year	Champion	Finalist
1978	Saskatoon Hilltops 24	Ottawa Sooners 4
1985	Saskatoon Hilltops 29	Ottawa Sooners 11

=== Leader-Post Trophy Championships ===
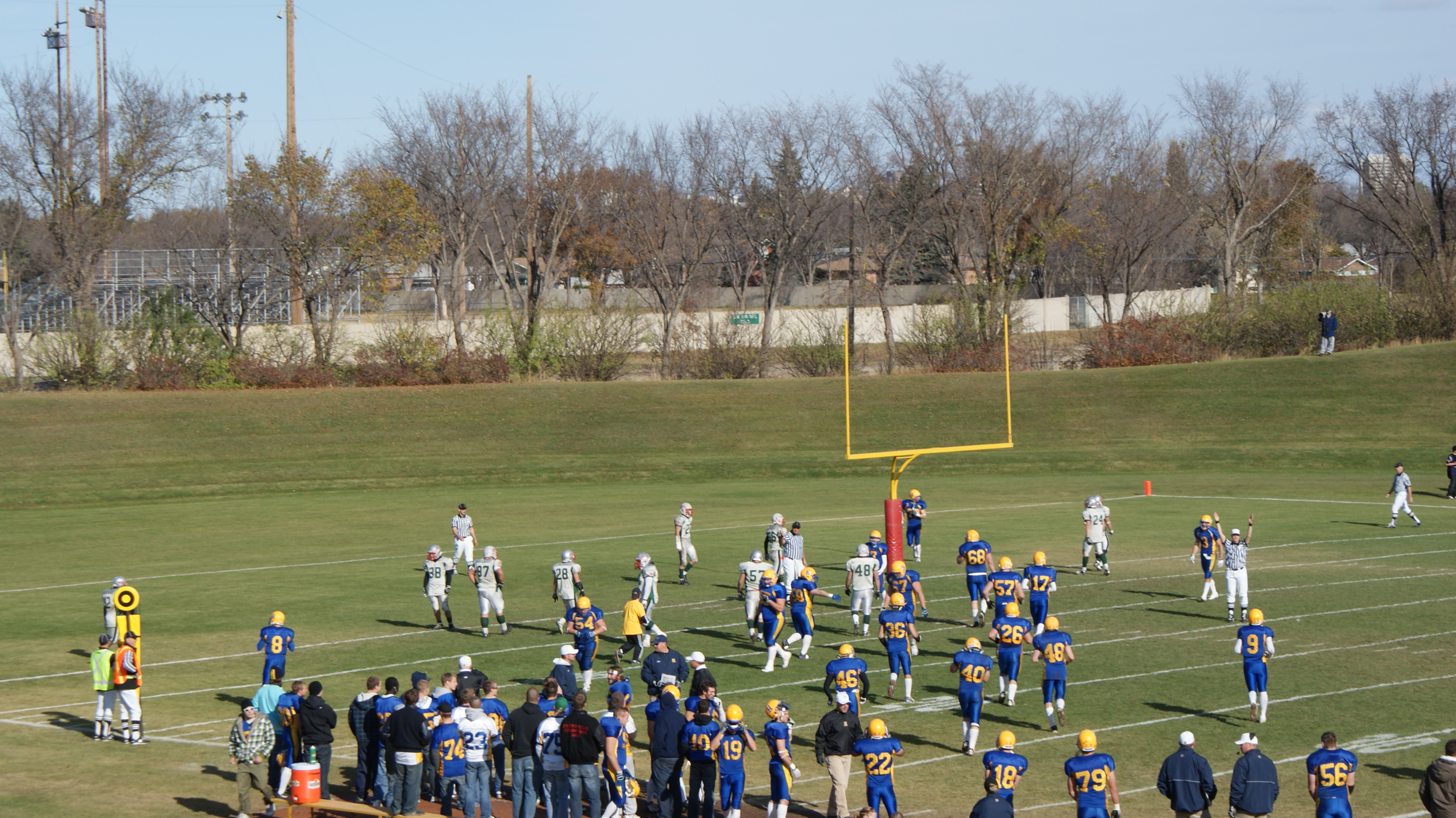
Touchdown in the October 10, 2008, playoff game

Year	Champion	Finalist
1953	Saskatoon Hilltops 34	Windsor AKO Fratmen 6
1958	Saskatoon Hilltops 18	Notre-Dame-de-Grace Maple Leafs 14
1959	Saskatoon Hilltops 46	Toronto NK Knights 7
1968	Saskatoon Hilltops 27	Ottawa Sooners 19
1969	Saskatoon Hilltops 28	Ottawa Sooners 7

== Executive committee members and directors ==
Position	Holder
President	Rod Janzen
President Elect	Greg Peacock
Past President	Chris Hengen-Braun
Vice President	Kim Wudrick
Team Manager	Kim Wudrick
Treasurer	Garrett Ferguson
Secretary	Stacey Ostertag
Operational Directors	Walt Smith/Janice Kozun/Ian Miller/Jeff Shyluk

== Coaching staff ==
Position	Holder
Head coach/Offensive Coordinator	Tom Sargeant
Quarterbacks	Shane Reider
Running Backs	Andre Lalonde
Defensive Backs	Brent Turkington
Offensive Line	Donnie Davidsen
Offensive Line Assistant	Ben Hodson
Defensive Line	David Fisher
Defensive Coordinator/Linebackers	Jeff Yausie
Receivers	Barclay Schlosser
Receivers Assistant	Evan Turkington
Life Coach	Bruce Rempel
