= Tri-City Bulldogs =

- Founded: 1925
- League: Canadian Junior Football League
- Team history: Vancouver Meralomas (1925-1990); Coquitlam-Meralomas Bulldogs (1991-1993); Tri-City Bulldogs (1994-2004)
- Based in: Coquitlam, British Columbia
- Stadium: Town Centre Stadium
- Colors: White, Red, and Black

The Tri-City Bulldogs were a Canadian Junior Football team based in Coquitlam, British Columbia. The Bulldogs played in the B.C. Football Conference, which itself is part of the Canadian Junior Football League (CJFL) and competes annually for the national title known as the Canadian Bowl.

The Bulldogs originally began in 1925 as the Vancouver Meralomas, and played until 1990 (although the team temporarily disbanded during World War II, and did not field a team for the 1958 season). The team moved to Coquitlam in 1991, and was known as the Coquitlam-Meralomas Bulldogs for the first three years. The name was changed to the Tri-City Bulldogs for the 1994 season.

During their 14 years in Coquitlam, the Bulldogs compiled a record of 42 wins, 91 losses, and 2 ties. Their most successful season came in 2001, when they had a record of 7 wins and 3 losses, which gave them first place in the Coastal Division and their first and only berth in the playoffs. However, they lost the playoff game to the Chilliwack Valley Huskers 26–21.

The Bulldogs folded after the 2004 season (where they finished with a 2–8 record).

The Bulldogs played their home games at Coquitlam's Town Centre Stadium.
