= Edmonton Huskies =

Canadian junior football team

Logo

General information
- Founded: 1954
- Stadium: Jasper Place Bowl
- Headquartered: Edmonton, Alberta
- Colours: Black, Gold, White
- Website: Official website

Personnel
- General manager: Jason Lorrimer
- Head coach: Marshal Klein

League / conference affiliations
- Canadian Junior Football League; Prairie Football Conference

Championships
- League championships: 0; 5 (1962, 1963, 1964, 2004, 2005)

The Edmonton Huskies are a Canadian Junior Football team based in Edmonton, Alberta. The Huskies play in the six-team Prairie Football Conference, which itself is part of the Canadian Junior Football League (CJFL) and competes annually for the national title known as the Canadian Bowl.

== History ==
The Huskies were founded in 1954. In the 1960s the Huskies won 3 National Championships in a row and two in a row in 2004 and 2005 under the direction of head coach Mike Mclean.

On October 30, 2004 the Huskies beat the Okanagan Sun 24-7 to win the Canadian Bowl. The very next year, the Huskies went on to beat the South Fraser Rams and then the St. Leonard Cougars to again win the national championship.

The Huskies are the pilot team for the Gender Based Violence Prevention Program (GBVPP) with the University of Alberta.

== Notable players ==
- Bill LaForge
- Pat Bowlen
