= John Rush (Canadian football) =

Canadian gridiron football player (born 1993)

- Rush with the York Lions in 2026

York Lions
- Title: Assistant linebackers coach
- CFL status: National

Personal information
- Born: October 23, 1993 (age 33); Niagara Falls, Ontario, Canada
- Listed height: 6 ft 1 in (1.85 m)
- Listed weight: 227 lb (103 kg)

Career information
- Positions: Fullback, linebacker (No. 32)
- High school: Saint Michael Catholic
- CJFL: Hamilton Hurricanes
- University: Guelph
- CFL draft: 2015: undrafted

Career history

Playing
- 2016: Winnipeg Blue Bombers*
- 2017–2020: Winnipeg Blue Bombers
- * Offseason or practice squad member only

Coaching
- 2025–present: York Lions

Awards and highlights
- Grey Cup champion (2019); Presidents' Trophy (2015)
- Stats at CFL.ca

John Rush (born October 23, 1993) is a Canadian football coach who is the assistant linebackers coach for the York Lions of U Sports football. He is a former professional football linebacker and fullback who played for three years with the Winnipeg Blue Bombers of the Canadian Football League (CFL).

== University career ==
Rush played CIS football at linebacker for the Guelph Gryphons from 2011 to 2015 where he won the Presidents' Trophy in his final year as university football's best defensive player.

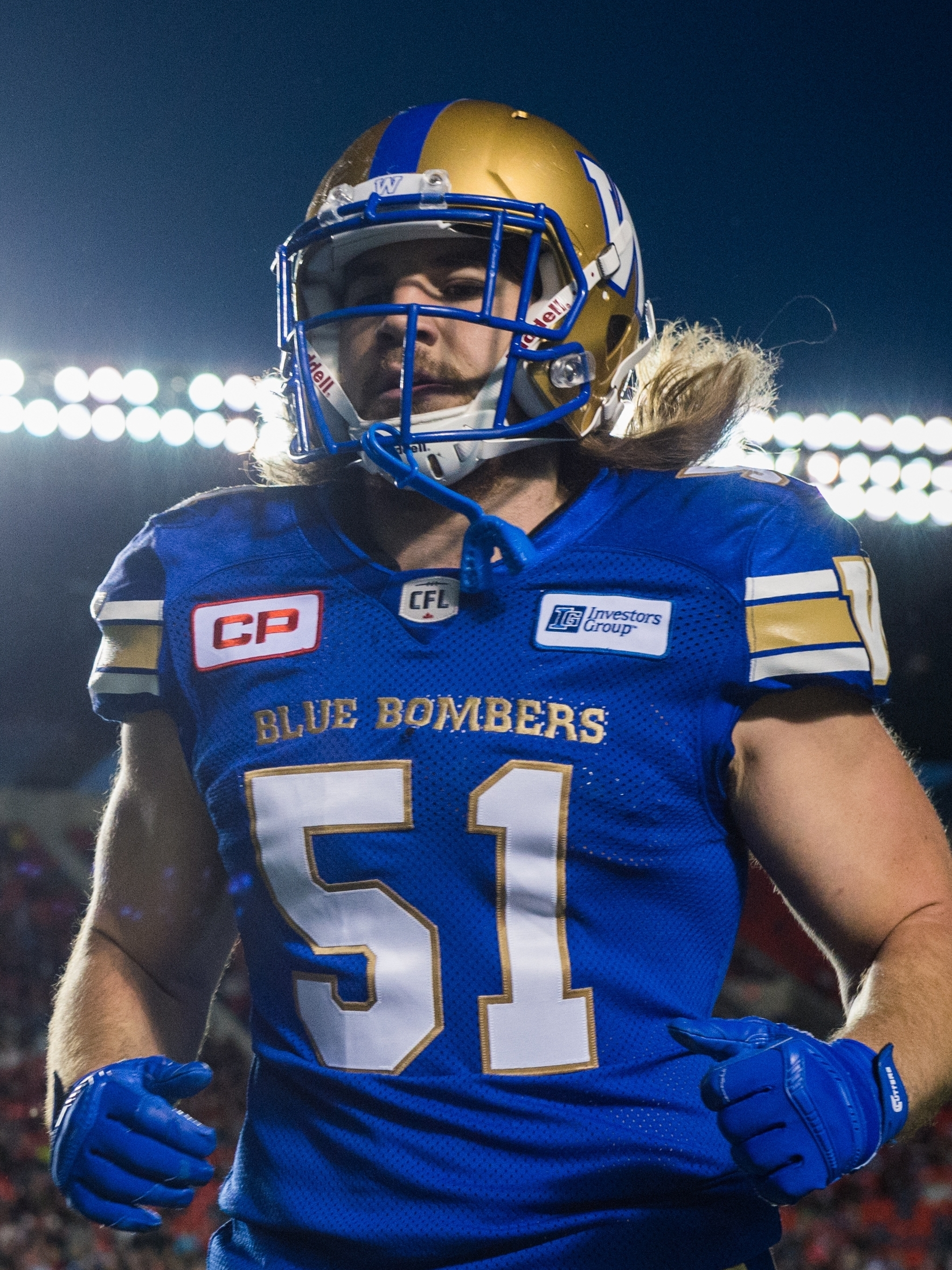
Rush with the Winnipeg Blue Bombers in 2016

== Professional career ==
Rush was signed as a free agent on November 30, 2015, by the Winnipeg Blue Bombers after going unselected in the 2015 CFL draft. He attended training camp with the Blue Bombers in 2016, but was part of the team's final cuts that year. Having exhausted his college eligibility, he played for the Canadian Junior Football League's Hamilton Hurricanes in 2016. Following that year, he was re-signed by the Blue Bombers on December 13, 2016.

Following training camp in 2017, Rush made the team's active roster and made his professional debut on July 1, 2017, against the Saskatchewan Roughriders. He played in all 18 regular season games where he had six special teams tackles. In 2018, he played in 13 regular season games and had one defensive tackle. In 2019, he again played in all 18 regular season games and recorded seven special teams tackles. He also played in his first Grey Cup game where the Blue Bombers defeated the Hamilton Tiger-Cats in the 107th Grey Cup. He did not play in 2020 due to the cancellation of the 2020 CFL season and became a free agent upon the expiry of his contract on February 9, 2021.

== Coaching career ==
In 2025, Rush joined the York Lions football team to serve as the team's assistant linebackers coach.

== Personal life ==
Rush used his COVID-19 vaccination to raise awareness for LGBT+ causes, wearing a full-length bridal gown and fully-styled hair and accessories for the occasion.
