= Wayne Lee =

Canadian football player (born 1959)

No. 17
- Position: Slotback

Personal information
- Born: October 20, 1959 (age 67); Toronto, Canada
- Listed height: 6 ft 1 in (1.85 m)
- Listed weight: 195 lb (88 kg)

Career information
- High school: Glengarry High School
- College: New Brunswick, Ottawa

Career history

Playing
- 1982: Ottawa Rough Riders
- 1983–1987: Hamilton Tiger-Cats

Coaching
- 1988–?: Hamilton Hurricanes

Awards and highlights
- Grey Cup champion (74th)

Wayne Lee (born October 20, 1959) is a Canadian former professional football slotback who played five seasons for the Hamilton Tiger-Cats of the Canadian Football League (CFL). He was originally signed by the Ottawa Rough Riders as an undrafted free agent in 1982 but did not play.

== Early life and education ==
Lee was born on October 20, 1959, in Toronto. He went to Pleasant Corners Public School for a year, Vancleek Hill Collegiate Institute for a few years, and Glengarry High School before going to college. He went to two colleges, University of New Brunswick and University of Ottawa. He spent 1979 to 1980 with New Brunswick, and 1981 to 1982 with Ottawa, playing for their football team, the Ottawa Gee-Gees.

== Professional career ==
Lee was originally signed as an undrafted free agent by the Ottawa Rough Riders in 1982, but did not play. In 1983, he signed with the Hamilton Tiger-Cats. He would play five seasons with them, mainly as a backup wide receiver and punt returner. In his first season with the team, 1983, he made 14 appearances but only made one catch. He played in 16 games the next year and had 7 catches for 95 yards. His long catch was 19 yards. He played in 16 games again in 1985, and was given the role of returner. Offensively he had 24 catches for 245 yards, and on special teams he had 10 punt returns for 117 yards. He also had 4 kick returns for 81 yards. In 1986, he became a starting receiver, playing in all 18 games, and had 46 catches for 564 yards. He also had his only two touchdowns in this season. He also had 40 punt returns for 351 yards and 4 kick returns for 63 yards. His longest punt return was 76 yards. The Tiger-Cats won the 74th Grey Cup this season. In his final season he was injured and only played in 9 games. He returned to the backup position, with only 6 catches for 74 yards. He kept his role of punt returner with 34 returns for 172 yards. He finished his career with 84 catches for 990 yards and 2 touchdowns. He played in a total of 73 games in his career.

== Later life ==
Shortly after his professional career, he was coach of the Canadian Junior Football League (CJFL) team the Hamilton Hurricanes. He led them to an undefeated season in 1990. He later taught gym class at Vankleek Hill Collegiate Institute.
