= Jay Diston =

Canadian football player (born 1990)

Profile
- Position: Wide receiver

Personal information
- Born: May 10, 1990 (age 36); Niagara Falls, Ontario, Canada
- Listed height: 6 ft 3 in (1.91 m)
- Listed weight: 185 lb (84 kg)

Career information
- CJFL: Burlington Braves
- University: Guelph

Career history
- 2012–2014: Hamilton Tiger-Cats
- Stats at CFL.ca (archive)

Jay Diston (born May 10, 1990) is a Canadian former professional football wide receiver. He participated in training camps with the Hamilton Tiger-Cats in 2011 and 2012 as a territorial exemption before signing with the team on April 15, 2013. Diston played for the Guelph Gryphons in 2010 before going on to play for the Burlington Braves of the CJFL for three years.
