= Diston =

Diston is a surname. Notable people with the surname include:

- Adam Marshall Diston (1893–1956), journalist, British Union of Fascists member, and ghostwriter for Winston Churchill
- Josiah Diston (1667–1737), English banker and politician
- Jay Diston (born 1990), Canadian football player
