= Quinte Riptides =

Junior Canadian football team

Logo

General information
- Founded: 2021
- Stadium: Mary Ann Sills Park
- Headquartered: Belleville, Ontario
- Colours: Black, lime green and white
- Website: www.skyhawksfootball.ca

Personnel
- General manager: Peter Gabriel
- Head coach: Leith Fisken

Team history
- Quinte Skyhawk (2021–2026); Quinte Riptides (2026–present)

League / conference affiliations
- Canadian Junior Football League; Ontario Football Conference

The Quite Riptides (formerly the Quinte Skyhawks) are a Canadian Junior Football League (CJFL) team located in Belleville, Ontario and representing the Quinte Region. The team plays in the Ontario Football Conference (OFC) which is part of the CJFL and compete annually for the national title known as the Canadian Bowl.

== History ==
The Skyhawks program first began as a youth organization in 2012 that first offered football camps in 2015 and was founded by Peter and Brenda Gabriel. On September 28, 2020, it was announced that the Canadian Junior Football League had granted the organization an expansion junior football team to begin play in the Ontario Conference in 2021. Warren Goldie was announced as the team's first head coach. The team also has a partnership with nearby Loyalist College for players to continue their post-secondary education. In 2026, the team was sold to new owners, who subsequently changed the team's name from the Quinte Skyhawks to the Quinte Riptides.
