= Langley Rams =

Canadian junior football team

Logo

General information
- Founded: 1948
- Stadium: McLeod Stadium
- Headquartered: Langley, British Columbia
- Colours: Navy Blue, Gold, and Grey
- Website: https://langleyrams.ca/

Personnel
- President: Dana Matheson

League / conference affiliations
- Canadian Junior Football League; B.C. Football Conference

Championships
- League championships: 1; 2021 National Champions
- Division championships: 10; 1990,1992,1993,1994,2005,2012,2014,2018,2019,2021

The Langley Rams (formerly the South Surrey Rams and Big Kahuna Rams) are a Canadian junior football team based in Langley, British Columbia. The Rams play in the seven-team B.C. Football Conference, which itself is part of the Canadian Junior Football League (CJFL) and competes annually for the national title known as the Canadian Bowl.

== History ==
The Rams were founded in 1948, where they were based in Surrey and known as the Surrey Rams and later the South Surrey Rams when the club briefly relocated to South Surrey. In 2006, the team was renamed the Big Kahuna Rams after a sponsorship deal was signed with Big Kahuna Sport Company. On December 5, 2010, the team was officially introduced as the Langley Rams as the team made the move to Langley to play in McLeod Athletic Park Stadium.

The Rams qualified for the Canadian CJFL Championship against the Saskatoon Hilltops in 2012, which was the team's first appearance in the title game since 1992. However, the Rams lost to the Hilltops by a score of 23–21, giving the Hilltops their third straight Championship. The Rams returned to the championship game in 2014, 2018, and 2019, but lost each time to the perennial powerhouse Hilltops.

In 2021, under the guidance of new head coach, Cory Philpot, the Rams defeated the Hilltops in the national semi-final by a score of 17–14. The Rams then went on to dominate in the Canadian Bowl, defeating the London Beefeaters by a score of 37–0 to win the first national championship in franchise history.

== 2021 National Championship season ==
2021 Schedule
Game	Location	Away team	Home team	Result
Week 1	NDSS	Langley Rams	VI Raiders	W 22-1
Week 2	McLeod Stadium	Okanagan Sun	Langley Rams	W 7-0
Week 3	Rotary Stadium	Langley Rams	Valley Huskers	W 22-0
Week 4	McLeod Stadium	Westshore Rebels	Langley Rams	W 37-7
Week 5	McLeod Stadium	Valley Huskers	Langley Rams	W 27-4
Week 6	Starlight Stadium	Langley Rams	Westshore Rebels	W 34-7
Week 7	McLeod Stadium	Kamloops Broncos	Langley Rams	W 27-0
Week 8	Apple Bowl	Langley Rams	Okanagan Sun	L 6-13
BCFC Semi Final	McLeod Stadium	Valley Huskers	Langley Rams	W 39-8
BCFC Cullen Cup	McLeod Stadium	Okanagan Sun	Langley Rams	W 7-4
CJFL Semi Final	McLeod Stadium	Saskatoon Hilltops	Langley Rams	W 17-14
CJFL Canadian Bowl	Alumni Stadium	Langley Rams	London Beefeaters	W 37-0

2021 Offensive Roster
Position	Name	Position	Name	Position	Name	Position	Name
Quarterback	18 Michael Calvert; 12 Jacob Davies; 16 Trey Jones	Running Back	28 Derek Best; 5 Joel Klaassen; 33 Spencer Schmitke; 26 Kai Thomas; 31 Julian Valerio	Wide receivers	87 Adam Brass; 17 Brody Clark; 82 Kayle Cowley; 89 Gabriel Fenelon; 80 Ian Finstad; 9 Alex France; 6 Mario Johnson; 4 Daniel Kubongo; 20 Peter Lee; 81 Jesse Nielsen; 85 David Osho; 84 Kevean Pashandi; 7 Darian Pritchard; 88 Ty Rooker; 6 Aniiah Rowe; 85 Micah Volledorf	Offensive line	51 Ross Baekey; 50 Brendan Fraser; 61 Zach Janzen; 66 Nikos Lazarakis; 60 Christopher Moon; 68 Nicolas Ouellette; 67 Cole Reeder; 55 Zack Rohan; 63 Sajjun Shokar; 65 Joseph Talabar; 56 Adam Tennet

2021 Defensive Roster
Position	Name	Position	Name	Position	Name	Position	Name
Defensive backs	23 Ryan Barthleson; 20 Thomas Box; 38 Dane Campbell; 21 Kyle Clarot; 38 Josh Forde; 8 Dawson Marchant; 36 Bachuoch Michael; 34 Nathan Murray; 42 Stryker Roloff; 2 Beko Wande	Linebackers	44 Cole Barron; 22 Colten Dejong; 53 Adam Hoegg; 48 Howard Jiao; 38 Nicholas Klaassen; 45 Manny Sahota; 57 Rohan Sharma; 10 Matteo Viani; 11 Keegan Vicklund	Defensive line	54 Rahul Chandra; 40 Pauljeet Dhami; 43 Tyler Eckert; 42 Matthew Fraser; 46 Jesse Goedman; 90 Justin Kular; 75 Chase Malenstyn; 49 Andrew Palmer		

2021 Special Teams Roster
Position	Name
Kickers	24 Tato Ferreyro Araya

2021 Coaching Staff
Position	Name
President	Derek Henneberry
Head coach	Cory Philpot
Offensive coordinator/offensive line	Andrew Butschler
Defensive coordinator	Chris Butschler
Special teams Coordinator/linebackers	Sean Wakeling
Running backs	Mike Derksen
Wide receivers	Phillip Eash
Wide receivers	Kirk Jones
Quarterbacks	Jordan McCarty
Quarterbacks	Nicolae Nica
Offensive line	David Rawlick
Defensive line	Alex Agnoletto
Defensive assistant	Travis Butschler
Defensive backs	Cam Clements
Defensive backs/ Strength & Conditioning	Bashiru Sise-Odaa
Kickers	Bryce Couture
