= Niagara Raiders =

Logo

General information
- Founded: 1958
- Folded: January 8, 2020
- Stadium: Kiwanis Field
- Headquartered: St. Catharines, Ontario, Canada
- Colours: Blue, Yellow, and White
- Website: niagararaidersfootball.ca

Personnel
- Owner: Larry Irish
- Head coach: Brad Anderson

Nickname
- Raiders

League / conference affiliations
- Canadian Junior Football League; Ontario Football Conference

The Niagara Raiders were a Canadian football team in the Canadian Junior Football League's Ontario Football Conference. Formerly the Burlington Braves, the team moved to the Niagara Region for the start of the 2016 season. The Raiders played in St. Catharines, Ontario for four years before announcing on January 8, 2020 that the team had been dissolved.
