= Calgary Colts =

Canadian Junior football team

Logo

General information
- Founded: 1965
- Stadium: Shouldice Athletic Park
- Headquartered: Calgary, Alberta
- Colours: red, white
- Website: Official website

Personnel
- Head coach: Elie Bouka

League / conference affiliations
- Canadian Junior Football League; Prairie Football Conference

Championships
- League championships: 0; 2 (1989, 1990)

The Calgary Colts are a Canadian Junior Football team based in Calgary, Alberta. The Colts play in the six-team Prairie Football Conference, which itself is part of the Canadian Junior Football League (CJFL) and competes annually for the national title known as the Canadian Bowl. The Colts were founded in 1965 and are two time National Champions (1989, 1990)

== Staff ==
- Head Coach: Elie Bouka
- Offensive Coordinator:
- Defensive Coordinator:
- Special Teams Coach:
- Receivers:
- Quarterbacks:
- Offensive Live:
- Running Backs:
- Linebackers:
- Defensive Backs:
- Defensive D-Line Coach:
- Equipment Manager:
- Social Media:
- Head Athletic Therapist:
- Athletic Therapist:
- Athletic Therapist: Moira Taylor
- Athletic Therapist: Nick Beresford

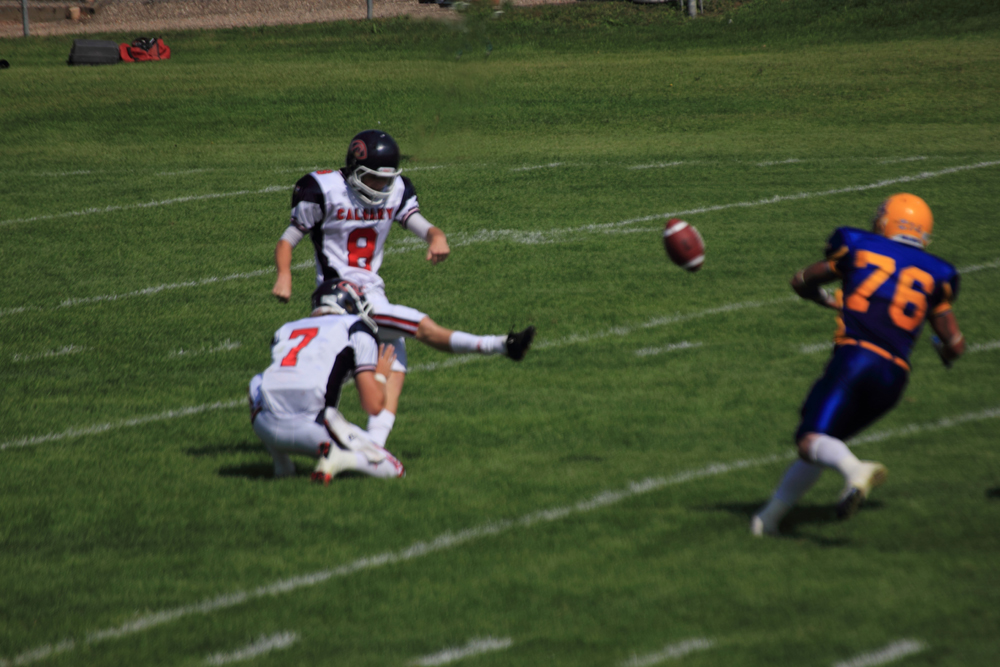
Calgary Colts were the visitors at Gordie Howe Bowl home to the Saskatoon Hilltops In the last minutes of the game, Saskatoon was ahead by one point. Calgary's Marshal Broom kicked a field goal to win the game by two points.

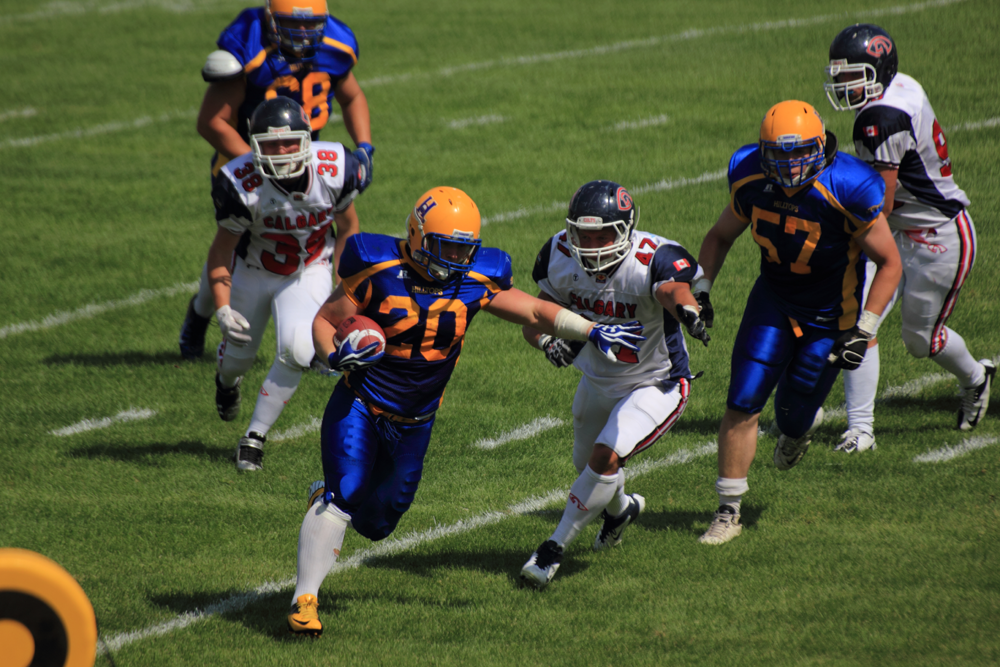
August 12, 2012 1:00 pm season starter game in the Prairie Football Conference. Canadian Junior Football League teams included Calgary and Saskatoon. Calgary Colts were the visitors at Gordie Howe Bowl home to the Saskatoon Hilltops. Andre Lalonde number 20 is seen here coming in with a touchdown at 2:29 p.m.

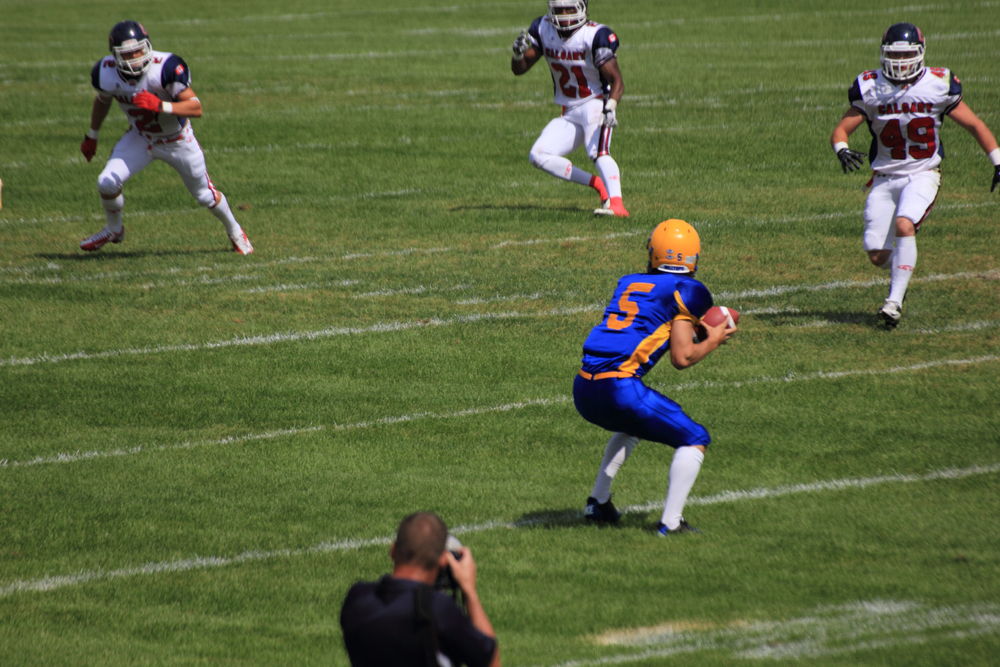
August 12, 2012 Amazing play by Saskatoon Hilltop quarterback number 8 Matt Karpinka. A lateral throw to the wide receiver number 5 Jared Andreychuk.

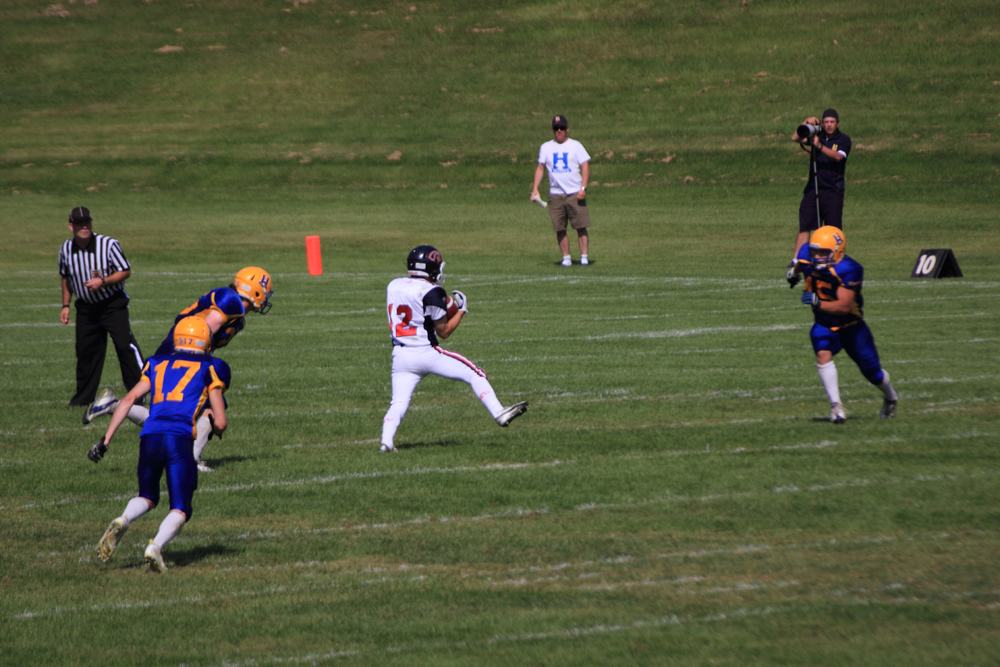
August 12, 2012 game vs Saskatoon Hilltops.
