= Valley Huskers =

Junior Canadian football club

Logo

General information
- Founded: March 28, 1999
- Stadium: Exhibition Stadium
- Headquartered: Chilliwack, British Columbia
- Colours: Black / Green / Gold
- Website: valleyhuskers.ca

Personnel
- Head coach: Bob Reist

League / conference affiliations
- Canadian Junior Football League; B.C. Football Conference

The Valley Huskers (formerly known as the Chilliwack Huskers) are a Canadian Junior Football team based in Chilliwack, British Columbia. The Huskers play in the eight-team B.C. Football Conference, which itself is part of the Canadian Junior Football League (CJFL) and competes annually for the national title known as the Canadian Bowl. The Huskers were founded in 1999 by Keith Currie, also known as "Father Football". Keith was also a co-founder of Chilliwack Minor Football.

== Season-by-season record ==
Valley Huskers
Season	GP	W	L	T	Pts	Finish
2014	10	1	9	0	2	6th
2015	10	0	10	0	0	6th
2016	10	0	10	0	0	6th
2017	10	0	10	0	0	6th
2018						
2019	10	2	8	0	4	5th
2020	Season cancelled					
2021	Season cancelled					
2022	10	2	8	0	4	5th
2023	11	7	4	0	14	3rd
2024	10	5	5	0	10	3rd
2025	10	4	5	1	9	5th

Source: "Standings - 2025 Regular Season". Canadian Junior Football League.

== Sources ==
- Vanden Bosch, Mike. "G.W. Graham varsity football coach Ryk Piché steps down to pursue a new coaching opportunity". Fraser Valley Today. Pattison Media.
- Welsh, Eric (26 April 2021). "Chilliwack's Valley Huskers scarecrow named best amateur football logo in Canada". Chilliwack Progress. Black Press Media.
- Welsh, Eric (31 July 2018). "New look Valley Huskers hope to recapture early 2000's magic". Chilliwack Progress. Black Press Media.
- "Ex-Manitoba Bison Bob Reist hired as new Valley Husker coach". Chilliwack Progress. Black Press Media. 5 January 2017.
- Welsh, Eric (12 July 2017). "New Valley Huskers coach embraces huge challenge". Chilliwack Progress. Black Press Media.
- Welsh, Eric (6 September 2016). "Valley Huskers changing head coach. Again". Chilliwack Progress. Black Press Media.
