= Ville-Émard Juveniles =

The Ville Emard Juveniles were a junior football team from Ville Emard, Quebec. They played in the Quebec Senior Football League, the Quebec Juvenile Football League, and the Quebec Junior Football League in the 1950s and 1960s.
