= Canadian Bowl =

Junior football championship in Canada

- Sport: Canadian football
- League: Canadian Junior Football League
- Awarded for: Winning the CJFL championship
- Country: Canada

History
- First award: November 29, 1908
- Editions: 117
- First winner: Parkland Canoe Club of Toronto
- Most wins: Saskatoon Hilltops (24)
- Most recent: Regina Thunder (2026)
- Website: www.cjfl.org/page/show/1285404-canadian-bowl-central

The Canadian Bowl is the championship of the Canadian Junior Football League. The three conference champions participate in the playdowns for the championship. One champion receives a bye to the game, while the other two play off in the Jostens Cup. The bye rotates among the three conferences. The 2025 champions are the Saskatoon Hilltops who have also won the most championships with 24 Canadian Bowl victories.

== Canadian Bowl ==
Since 1989 the game has been known as the Canadian Bowl.

Date	Winning team	Score	Losing team	Score	Locations
Nov 8, 2026	Regina Thunder	42	Westshore Rebels	21	Starlight Stadium, Langford, British Columbia
Nov 8, 2025	Saskatoon Hilltops	21	Okanagan Sun	18	Saskatoon Minor Football Field, Saskatoon, Saskatchewan
Nov 9, 2024	St. Clair Saints	37	Okanagan Sun	22	Acumen Stadium, Windsor, Ontario
Nov 11, 2023	Saskatoon Hilltops	17	Westshore Rebels	10	Starlight Stadium, Langford, British Columbia
Nov 12, 2022	Okanagan Sun	21	Regina Thunder	19	Mosaic Stadium, Regina, Saskatchewan
Dec 4, 2021	Langley Rams	37	London Beefeaters	0	TD Stadium, London, Ontario
2020	Cancelled due to the COVID-19 pandemic in Canada				
Nov 16, 2019	Saskatoon Hilltops	11	Langley Rams	6	McLeod Stadium, Langley, British Columbia
Nov 17, 2018	Saskatoon Hilltops	58	Langley Rams	21	Saskatoon Minor Football Field, Saskatoon, Saskatchewan
Nov 11, 2017	Saskatoon Hilltops	56	Windsor AKO Fratmen	11	Alumni Field, Windsor, Ontario
Nov 12, 2016	Saskatoon Hilltops	37	Westshore Rebels	25	Westhills Stadium, Langford, British Columbia
Nov 7, 2015	Saskatoon Hilltops	38	Okanagan Sun	24	Saskatoon Minor Football Field, Saskatoon, Saskatchewan
Nov 8, 2014	Saskatoon Hilltops	39	Langley Rams	14	McLeod Stadium, Langley, British Columbia
Nov 9, 2013	Regina Thunder	55	Vancouver Island Raiders	26	Mosaic Stadium at Taylor Field, Regina, Saskatchewan
Nov 10, 2012	Saskatoon Hilltops	23	Langley Rams	21	McLeod Stadium, Langley, British Columbia
Nov 14, 2011	Saskatoon Hilltops	29	Hamilton Hurricanes	1	Ivor Wynne Stadium, Hamilton, Ontario
Nov 13, 2010	Saskatoon Hilltops	34	Vancouver Island Raiders	23	Griffiths Stadium, Saskatoon, Saskatchewan
Nov 14, 2009	Vancouver Island Raiders	51	Edmonton Wildcats	14	Caledonia Park, Nanaimo, British Columbia
Nov 8, 2008	Vancouver Island Raiders	35	Burlington Braves	8	Nelson Stadium, Burlington, Ontario
Nov 3, 2007	Saskatoon Hilltops	26	St. Leonard Cougars	3	Canad Inns Stadium, Winnipeg, Manitoba
Nov 11, 2006	Vancouver Island Raiders	27	Edmonton Wildcats	26	Caledonia Park, Nanaimo, British Columbia
Nov 12, 2005	Edmonton Huskies	34	St. Leonard Cougars	15	Stade Hebert, Montreal, Quebec
Oct 30, 2004	Edmonton Huskies	24	Okanagan Sun	7	Commonwealth Stadium, Edmonton, Alberta
Nov 8, 2003	Saskatoon Hilltops	59	Victoria Rebels	0	Exhibition Stadium, Chilliwack, British Columbia
Nov 16, 2002	Saskatoon Hilltops	20	St. Leonard Cougars	18	Stade Hebert, Montreal, Quebec
Nov 4, 2001	Saskatoon Hilltops	45	Okanagan Sun	11	Foote Field, Edmonton, Alberta
Nov 11, 2000	Okanagan Sun	36	Saskatoon Hilltops	28	Apple Bowl, Kelowna, British Columbia
Nov 13, 1999	Windsor AKO Fratmen	32	Okanagan Sun	29	Windsor Stadium, Windsor, Ontario
Nov 14, 1998	Regina Rams	36	Okanagan Sun	13	Taylor Field, Regina, Saskatchewan
Nov 8, 1997	Regina Rams	23	Okanagan Sun	20 (OT)	Apple Bowl, Kelowna, British Columbia
Nov 9, 1996	Saskatoon Hilltops	38	Windsor AKO Fratmen	7	Windsor Stadium, Windsor, Ontario
Nov 11, 1995	Regina Rams	26	Ottawa Sooners	10	Taylor Field, Regina, Saskatchewan
Nov 12, 1994	Regina Rams	52	St. Leonard Cougars	11	Stade Hebert, Montreal, Quebec
Nov 13, 1993	Regina Rams	23	Hamilton Hurricanes	11	Taylor Field, Regina, Saskatchewan
Nov 14, 1992	Ottawa Sooners	35	Surrey Rams	18	Lansdowne Park, Ottawa, Ontario
Nov 9, 1991	Saskatoon Hilltops	48	Ottawa Sooners	7	Gordie Howe Bowl, Saskatoon, Saskatchewan
Nov 10, 1990	Calgary Colts	50	Windsor AKO Fratmen	15	Windsor Stadium, Windsor, Ontario
Nov 12, 1989	Calgary Colts	23	Burlington Jr. Tiger-Cats	6	McMahon Stadium, Calgary, Alberta

== Armadale Cup ==
From 1976 to 1988 the Canadian championship was known as the Armadale Cup.

Date	Winning team	Score	Losing team	Score	Locations
Nov 12, 1988	Okanagan Sun	50	Burlington Jr. Tiger-Cats	0	Burlington, Ontario
Nov 15, 1987	Regina Rams	31	St. Vital Mustangs	23	Taylor Field, Regina, Saskatchewan
Nov 15, 1986	Regina Rams	53	Ottawa Sooners	12	Taylor Field, Regina, Saskatchewan
Nov 9, 1985	Saskatoon Hilltops	29	Ottawa Sooners	11	Frank Clair Stadium, Ottawa, Ontario
Nov 10, 1984	Ottawa Sooners	46	Richmond Raiders	23	Kelowna, British Columbia
Nov 12, 1983	Edmonton Wildcats	30	Ottawa Sooners	11	Windsor, Ontario
Nov 13, 1982	Renfrew Trojans	46	Montreal Jr. Concordes	0	Vancouver, British Columbia
Nov 14, 1981	Regina Rams	46	Hamilton Hurricanes	24	Hamilton, Ontario
Nov 8, 1980	Regina Rams	26	Hamilton Hurricanes	24	Regina, Saskatchewan
Nov 10, 1979	Ottawa Sooners	13	Regina Rams	9	Hamilton, Ontario
Nov 19, 1978	Saskatoon Hilltops	24	Ottawa Sooners	4	Saskatoon, Saskatchewan
Nov 20, 1977	Edmonton Wildcats	28	Hamilton Hurricanes	0	–
Nov 13, 1976	Regina Rams	45	Hamilton Hurricanes	23	Regina, Saskatchewan

== Leader Post trophy ==
From 1925 to 1975 the Canadian championship was known as the Leader Post trophy.

Date	Winning team	Score	Losing team	Score	Locations
Nov 16, 1975	Regina Rams	38	Hamilton Hurricanes	19	–
Nov 23, 1974	Ottawa Sooners	17	Vancouver Meralomas	4	Vancouver, British Columbia
Nov 10, 1973	Regina Rams	9	Ottawa Sooners	0	Ottawa, Ontario
Nov 11, 1972	Hamilton Hurricanes	33	Regina Rams	8	Saskatoon, Saskatchewan
Nov 13, 1971	Regina Rams	42	Burlington Braves	13	Hamilton, Ontario
Nov 13, 1970	Regina Rams	39	Burlington Braves	8	Regina, Saskatchewan
Nov 15, 1969	Saskatoon Hilltops	28	Ottawa Sooners	7	Ottawa, Ontario
Nov 11, 1968	Saskatoon Hilltops	27	Ottawa Sooners	19	Edmonton, Alberta
Nov 12, 1967	Edmonton Wildcats	29	Burlington Braves	6	Regina, Saskatchewan
Nov 11, 1966	Regina Rams	29	NDG Maple Leafs	14	Saskatoon, Saskatchewan
Nov 21, 1965	NDG Maple Leafs	2	Edmonton Huskies	1	Montreal, Quebec
Nov 11, 1964	Edmonton Huskies	48	NDG Maple Leafs	27	Calgary, Alberta
Nov 16, 1963	Edmonton Huskies	47	NDG Maple Leafs	3	Calgary, Alberta
Nov 24, 1962	Edmonton Huskies	7	NDG Maple Leafs	3	Hamilton, Ontario
Nov 15, 1961	St. James Rods	16	Rosemount Bombers	13	Calgary, Alberta
Nov 19, 1960	Rosemount Bombers	22	Saskatoon Hilltops	20	Montreal, Quebec
Nov 21, 1959	Saskatoon Hilltops	46	North York Knight	7	Saskatoon, Saskatchewan
Nov 23, 1958	Saskatoon Hilltops	18	NDG Maple Leafs	14	Montreal, Quebec
Nov 23, 1957	Toronto Parkdale Lions	19	Winnipeg Rods	13	Winnipeg, Manitoba
Nov 18, 1956	Winnipeg Rods	21	Toronto Parkdale Lions	10	Toronto, Ontario
Nov 19, 1955	Winnipeg Rods	19	Windsor AKO Fratmen	13	Winnipeg, Manitoba
Nov 20, 1954	Windsor AKO Fratmen	13	Winnipeg Rods	9	Windsor, Ontario
Nov 21, 1953	Saskatoon Hilltops	34	Windsor AKO Fratmen	6	Saskatoon, Saskatchewan
Nov 22, 1952	Windsor AKO Fratmen	15	Edmonton Wildcats	12	Windsor, Ontario
Nov 17, 1951	Hamilton Jr Tiger-Cats	21	Edmonton Maple Leafs	1	Edmonton, Alberta
Nov 18, 1950	Hamilton Jr Tiger-Cats	14	Vancouver Blue Bombers	5	Hamilton, Ontario
Nov 20, 1949	Hamilton Wildcats	14	Vancouver Blue Bombers	11	Vancouver, British Columbia
Nov 20, 1948	Hamilton Wildcats	14	Saskatoon Hilltops	10	Hamilton, Ontario
Jan 1, 3, 1948	Vancouver Blue Bombers	19	Hamilton Jr Tigers	8	Vancouver, British Columbia
1946	No championship				
1945	No championship due to World War II				
1944	No championship due to World War II				
1943	No championship due to World War II				
1942	No championship due to World War II				
1941	No championship due to World War II				
1940	No championship due to World War II				
1939	No championship due to World War II				
Dec 3, 1938	Regina Dales	4	Montréal Westmounts	3	Montreal, Quebec
