= Burlington Braves =

Canadian junior football league team

General information
- Founded: 1958
- Headquartered: Burlington, Ontario, Canada
- Colours: Blue, yellow, and white

League / conference affiliations
- Canadian Junior Football League; Ontario Football Conference

The Burlington Braves were a Canadian junior football league team. Founded in 1958 in Burlington, Ontario, they played in the Ontario Football Conference of the Canadian Junior Football League. Following the 2015 season, the club moved its operations on St. Catharines, Ontario and became the Niagara Raiders.

Canadian Football Hall of Fame players, Tony Gabriel, Peter Dalla Riva, and John Bonk, started their football careers with the Braves.
