= St-Leonard Cougars =

St-Leonard Cougars
City	Montreal, Quebec
League’s	MRFL QBFL QMFL
Division	Quebec Football Conference
Founded	1986
Colours	Orange and Blue
Home field	Stade Hebert

The St-Leonard Cougars were a CJFL football team located in Saint-Leonard, Quebec. They played in the Ontario Football Conference from 1994 to 2013.
