= St. Clair Saints (football) =

Canadian football team

Logo

General information
- Founded: 1929
- Stadium: St. Clair College Sports Park
- Headquartered: Windsor Ontario, Canada
- Colours: Green, Gold, and White
- Website: saintsathletics.ca

Personnel
- Owner: Saints Student Athletic Association Inc.
- Head coach: Mike LaChance

Nicknames
- Frat, AKO

League / conference affiliations
- Canadian Junior Football League; Ontario Football Conference

Championships
- League championships: 0; 4 (1952, 1954, 1999, 2024)

The St. Clair Saints are a Canadian football team based in Windsor, Ontario, Canada. The team has played in the Canadian Junior Football League's Ontario Football Conference since the 1940s and won national titles in 1952, 1954, 1999, and 2024. The team was known as the Windsor AKO Fratmen until 2020 when the team was purchased by St. Clair College's Student Athletic Association.

== History ==
Logo of the Windsor Fratmen.

The team was sponsored by the AKO Fraternity and dates back to 1929, making it the longest-running community organization providing a junior football program in Canada without interruption. The AKO Fraternity is a non-profit, fraternal organization dedicated to supporting and sponsoring youth in amateur sports. The Fratmen played at Fratmen Field at Windsor Stadium from 1953 to 2014. The team later played their home games at Ecole E.J. Lajeunesse and at Alumni Field at the University of Windsor.

Logo of the St. Clair Fratmen.

On January 22, 2014, AKO Fraternity announced it had sold the Team to Mike Morencie, a former player, Head Coach and Defensive Coordinator. In May of the same year, St Clair College and the Fratmen announced a partnership which will help college-bound students the opportunity to play in the CJFL. The Fratmen had hoped to call St Clair College their home field pending a planned domed stadium being built on the Windsor Campus.

Morencie sold the team to the St. Clair College Student Athletic Association in February 2020 in a deal whereby Morencie, head coach Mike Lachance and other Fratmen staff retain control of football operations while the Student Athletic Association take on the business side and game-day operations.

== Notable players ==
- Tommy Grant was inducted into the Canadian Football Hall of Fame in 1995. He played 14 years with the Hamilton Tiger-Cats and the Winnipeg Blue Bombers.
- Zeno Karcz played 9 years with the Hamilton Tiger-Cats and is a 3 time Grey Cup Champion (1957, 1963, 1965). After retiring, Karcz was Head Coach of the Fratmen from 1967-1969.
- Bob Dawson spent 7 years with the Hamilton Tiger-Cats and 1952 Grey Cup Champion.
- Walter Spencer was selected in the 3rd Round of the 2004 CFL Draft by the Saskatchewan Roughriders and is a three-time Grey Cup Champion (2009, 2010 Montreal Alouettes and 2012 Toronto Argonauts).
- Llevi Noel was selected in the 4th Round (31st overall) of the 2016 CFL Draft by the Toronto Argonauts and is a 2017 Grey Cup Champion.
