= Hamilton Hurricanes =

Junior Canadian football team in Ontario

- Nicknames: The Canes
- Sport: Canadian football
- Founded: 1963
- League: Canadian Junior Football League
- Conference: Ontario Football Conference
- Team history: 1963–1994, 2008–Present
- Based in: Hamilton, Ontario
- Stadium: Tim Hortons Field
- Colours: Orange, blue and white
- National championships: 1 (1972)
- Website: www.the-canes.com

The Hamilton Hurricanes are a junior Canadian football team based in Hamilton, Ontario. Founded in 1963, the team competes in the Ontario Football Conference of the Canadian Junior Football League.

== History ==
The original Hurricanes team was founded in 1963 and won eight provincial titles and one Leader Post Trophy as national champions. The team folded in 1994 due to financial difficulties but returned for the 2008 season.
