= Canadian Junior Football League =

Canadian football league founded 1974

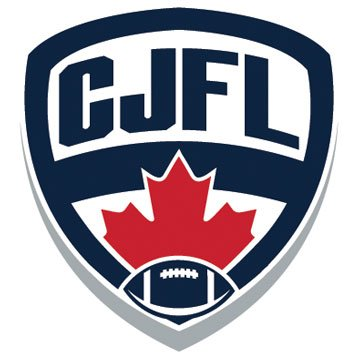
- Official logo (2021)
- Sport: Canadian football
- Founded: 1974
- Commissioner: Jim Pankovich
- Divisions: 3
- No. of teams: 20 teams
- Country: Canada
- Most recent champion: Regina Thunder (2026)
- Most titles: Saskatoon Hilltops
- Domestic cup: Canadian Bowl
- Website: cjfl.org

The Canadian Junior Football League (CJFL) is a national Canadian football league consisting of 20 teams playing in five provinces across Canada. The teams compete annually for the Canadian Bowl. Many CJFL players move on to professional football careers in the Canadian Football League (CFL) and elsewhere.

Formed May 8, 1974, the CJFL's formal mission statement is: "The Canadian Junior Football League provides the opportunity for young men aged 17 to 22 to participate in highly competitive post-high school football that is unique in Canada. The goal of the league is to foster community involvement and yield a positive environment by teaching discipline, perseverance and cooperation. The benefits of the league are strong camaraderie, national competition and life-long friends."

A handful of standout players are typically signed directly to CFL rosters each season, while U Sports permits up to two years of play in leagues such as the CJFL before a player begins to lose eligibility.

The Quebec Junior Football League was formerly part of the CJFL, but now operates independently .

== Teams ==
The CJFL has 19 teams as of 2026, (One less than the year before due to the December 2025 loss of the GTA Grizzlies) including seven in the B.C. conference, six in the Prairie conference, and six in the Ontario conference.

B.C. conference
Team	City	Stadium	Founded
Kamloops Broncos	Kamloops, British Columbia	Hillside Stadium	2007
Langley Rams	Langley, British Columbia	McLeod Stadium	1948
Okanagan Sun	Kelowna, British Columbia	Apple Bowl	1980
Prince George Kodiaks	Prince George, British Columbia	Masich Place Stadium	2022
Valley Huskers	Chilliwack, British Columbia	Exhibition Stadium	1999
Vancouver Island Raiders	Nanaimo, British Columbia	NDSS Field	2005
Westshore Rebels	Langford, British Columbia	Starlight Stadium	1971

Prairie conference
Team	City	Stadium	Founded
Calgary Colts	Calgary, Alberta	Shouldice Athletic Park	1967
Edmonton Huskies	Edmonton, Alberta	Jasper Place Bowl	1954
Edmonton Wildcats	Sherwood Park, Alberta	Emerald Hills Sports Pavilion	1948
Regina Thunder	Regina, Saskatchewan	Mosaic Stadium	1999
Saskatoon Hilltops	Saskatoon, Saskatchewan	SMF Field	1947
Winnipeg Rifles	Winnipeg, Manitoba	Maple Grove Park	1999

Ontario conference
Team	City	Stadium	Founded
Hamilton Hurricanes	Hamilton, Ontario	Tim Hortons Field	1963
London Beefeaters	London, Ontario	City Wide Sports Complex	1975
Ottawa Sooners	Ottawa, Ontario	Gee Gees Field	1960
Quinte Riptides	Belleville, Ontario	Mary Ann Sills Park	2021
Sault College Cougars	Sault Ste. Marie, Ontario	Rocky DiPietro Field	2025
St. Clair Saints	Windsor, Ontario	Acumen Stadium	1929

=== League map ===
Teams of the CJFL
B.C. Football Conference
Prairie Football Conference
Ontario Football Conference

=== Recent expansion ===
The Sault College Cougars made their debut as an expansion team in the Ontario Conference in the 2025 CJFL season. The team is based in Sault Ste. Marie, Ontario, and operated by Sault College.

=== Future teams ===
A proposed expansion franchise for Lethbridge, Alberta, in the Prairie Conference was rejected by the league in 2023.

=== Defunct teams ===
Former CJFL logo in use until 2021

- Abbotsford Air Force 1987–2006 (Abbotsford, B.C.)
- Brampton Bears 2009–2011 Brampton, Ontario)
- Brampton Satellites (Brampton, Ontario)
- Brantford Bisons (Brantford, Ontario)
- Burlington Braves, Burlington, Ontario)
- Burnaby Spartans 1956–1973 (Burnaby, B.C.)
- Calgary Mohawks (Calgary, Alberta)
- Calgary Cougars (Calgary, Alberta)
- Chateauguay Raiders (Châteauguay, Quebec)
- Cornwall Emards (Cornwall, Ontario)
- Fort Garry Lions (Winnipeg, Manitoba)
- Grand River Predators (Kitchener, Ontario)
- GTA Bears 2012–2013, Brampton, Ontario)
- Laval Scorpions (Laval, Quebec)
- Niagara Raiders (St. Catharines, Ontario)
- North Shore Lions 1947–1954 (North Vancouver (City and District), B.C.)
- North Shore Cougars 1955–1980 (North Vancouver (City and District), B.C.)
- Notre-Dame-de-Grace Maple Leafs (Montreal, Quebec, merged with the Verdun Invictus, renamed to the Verdun Maple Leafs, then the Montreal Junior Alouettes, and finally the Montreal Junior Concordes)
- Oshawa Hawkeyes (Oshawa, Ontario)
- Ottawa Junior Riders moved back to the QJFL after 2005) (Ottawa, Ontario)
- Quebec City Citadelles, Quebec City, Quebec)
- Red Deer Packers (Red Deer, Alberta)
- Renfrew Trojans 1974–1993 (1994–2009 as the Vancouver Trojans) (Vancouver, B.C.)
- Medicine Hat Rattlers (Medicine Hat, Alberta
- Regina Rams 1954–1999 (moved to the CIS) (Regina, Saskatchewan)
- Richmond Raiders 1973–1992 Richmond, B.C.)
- Rosemount Bombers (Montreal, Quebec)
- Sault Ste. Marie Storm (Sault Ste. Marie), Quebec)
- Sherbrooke Blitz, (Sherbrooke, Quebec)
- South Shore Cobras, (Saint-Hubert, Quebec)
- St. Hubert Rebelles (Saint-Hubert), Quebec)
- St. Leonard Cougars (Montreal, Quebec)
- St. Vital Mustangs (Winnipeg, Manitoba)
- Thunder Bay Giants (Thunder Bay, Ontario)
- Toronto Junior Argonauts, (Toronto, Ontario)
- Tri-City Bulldogs 1991–2004 (Formed from the Vancouver Meralomas) Coquitlam, B.C.)
- Vancouver Blue Bombers 1947–1977 (Vancouver, B.C.)
- Vancouver Meralomas 1931–1990 (Vancouver, B.C.)
- Verdun Shamcats (Verdun, Quebec)
- Ville-Émard Juveniles (Ville-Émard, Quebec)
- Winnipeg Hawkeyes (Winnipeg, Manitoba)
- Winnipeg Rods (Winnipeg, Manitoba)

== Championships ==
The Saskatoon Hilltops have won the most national championships since 1974 with 19, followed by the Regina Rams with 11, and the Ottawa Sooners with 4. The national championship is known as the Canadian Bowl. Prior to 1989, league champions were awarded the Armadale Cup. The Leader-Post Trophy was awarded under the auspices of the Canadian Amateur Football Association from 1925 through 1973.

=== Canadian Bowl ===
- 2026 – Regina Thunder
- 2025 – Saskatoon Hilltops
- 2024 – Windsor St. Clair Saints
- 2023 – Saskatoon Hilltops
- 2022 – Okanagan Sun
- 2021 – Langley Rams
- 2020 – Not awarded
- 2019 – Saskatoon Hilltops
- 2018 – Saskatoon Hilltops
- 2017 – Saskatoon Hilltops
- 2016 – Saskatoon Hilltops
- 2015 – Saskatoon Hilltops
- 2014 – Saskatoon Hilltops
- 2013 – Regina Thunder
- 2012 – Saskatoon Hilltops
- 2011 – Saskatoon Hilltops
- 2010 – Saskatoon Hilltops
- 2009 – Vancouver Island Raiders
- 2008 – Vancouver Island Raiders
- 2007 – Saskatoon Hilltops
- 2006 – Vancouver Island Raiders
- 2005 – Edmonton Huskies
- 2004 – Edmonton Huskies
- 2003 – Saskatoon Hilltops
- 2002 – Saskatoon Hilltops
- 2001 – Saskatoon Hilltops
- 2000 – Okanagan Sun
- 1999 – Windsor AKO Fratmen
- 1998 – Regina Rams
- 1997 – Regina Rams
- 1996 – Saskatoon Hilltops
- 1995 – Regina Rams
- 1994 – Regina Rams
- 1993 – Regina Rams
- 1992 – Ottawa Sooners
- 1991 – Saskatoon Hilltops
- 1990 – Calgary Colts
- 1989 – Calgary Colts

=== Armadale Cup (1974–1988) ===
- 1988 – Okanagan Sun
- 1987 – Regina Rams
- 1986 – Regina Rams
- 1985 – Saskatoon Hilltops
- 1984 – Ottawa Sooners
- 1983 – Edmonton Wildcats
- 1982 – Renfrew Trojans
- 1981 – Regina Rams
- 1980 – Regina Rams
- 1979 – Ottawa Sooners
- 1978 – Saskatoon Hilltops
- 1977 – Edmonton Wildcats
- 1976 – Regina Rams
- 1975 – Regina Rams
- 1974 – Ottawa Sooners

=== Leader-Post Trophy ===
- 1973 – Regina Rams
- 1972 – Hamilton Hurricanes
- 1971 – Regina Rams
- 1970 – Regina Rams
- 1969 – Saskatoon Hilltops
- 1968 – Saskatoon Hilltops
- 1967 – Edmonton Wildcats
- 1966 – Regina Rams
- 1965 – Notre-Dame-de-Grace Maple Leafs
- 1964 – Edmonton Huskies
- 1963 – Edmonton Huskies
- 1962 – Edmonton Huskies
- 1961 – Winnipeg Rods
- 1960 – Montreal Rosemount Bombers
- 1959 – Saskatoon Hilltops
- 1958 – Saskatoon Hilltops
- 1957 – Toronto Parkdale Lions
- 1956 – Winnipeg Rods
- 1955 – Winnipeg Rods
- 1954 – Windsor AKO Fratmen
- 1953 – Saskatoon Hilltops
- 1952 – Windsor AKO Fratmen
- 1951 – Hamilton Jr. Tiger Cats
- 1950 – Hamilton Jr. Tiger Cats
- 1949 – Hamilton Jr. Wildcats
- 1948 – Hamilton Jr. Wildcats
- 1947 – Vancouver Blue Bombers
- 1925 – Montreal AAA
