= Okanagan Sun =

Canadian Football team in British Columbia

Logo

General information
- Founded: 1980
- Stadium: Apple Bowl
- Headquartered: Kelowna, British Columbia
- Colours: Burnt orange, Brown and white

Personnel
- Head coach: Travis Miller

League / conference affiliations
- Canadian Junior Football League; B.C. Football Conference

Championships
- League championships: 0; 3 (1988, 2000, 2022)

The Okanagan Sun are a Canadian Junior Football team based in Kelowna, British Columbia. The Sun play in the seven-team B.C. Football Conference, which itself is part of the Canadian Junior Football League (CJFL) and competes annually for the national title known as the Canadian Bowl. The Sun were founded in 1980, began play in 1981, and are one of the most successful teams in junior football history. They have had 25 consecutive winning seasons (1982 through 2006), were the BCFC champions 14 times, and won the Canadian Bowl three times as CJFL champions in 1988, 2000 and 2022.
