= Vancouver Island Raiders =

Logo

General information
- Founded: 2005
- Stadium: Q'unq'inuqwsuxw Stadium
- Headquartered: Nanaimo, British Columbia
- Colours: Black, White, Red
- Website: viraiders.ca

Personnel
- Head coach: Shawn Arabsky

League / conference affiliations
- Canadian Junior Football League; BC Football Conference

Championships
- League championships: 0; 3 (2006, 2008, 2009)
- Division championships: 0; 8 (2006, 2007, 2008, 2009, 2010, 2011, 2013, 2017)

The Vancouver Island Raiders are a Canadian Junior Football team based in Nanaimo, British Columbia. The Raiders compete in the British Columbia Football Conference (BCFC), which is part of the Canadian Junior Football League (CJFL). The team plays its home games at Q’unq’inuqwstuxw Stadium and competes annually for the BCFC championship Cullen Cup, and the Canadian Bowl, the CJFL national championship.

== History ==
The Raiders were founded in 2005 in Nanaimo, BC. Between 2006 and 2011, the team captured six consecutive BCFC Championships, adding two more in 2013 and 2017. The Raiders also won three national titles (2006, 2008, 2009) and appeared in five Canadian Bowl games overall. In 2018, the Raiders were inducted into the BC Football Hall of Fame in recognition of their sustained excellence and impact on the sport.

== Leadership ==
The Raiders are led by President and Director of Football Operations Andrew Harris, a four-time Grey Cup champion and one of the most decorated players in CFL history. Head Coach Shawn Arabsky oversee the team’s football operations and player development.

== Notable alumni ==
The Vancouver Island Raiders have produced numerous standout players who have gone on to excel at the university and professional levels, helping establish the team as a national development powerhouse.
Andrew Harris – Four-time Grey Cup champion; among the CFL’s all-time leaders in rushing yards and touchdowns.

Lorne Plante – Manitoba Bisons and BC Lions (CFL).

Brian Ridgeway – Drafted 39th overall by the Montreal Alouettes in 2010; played for Simon Fraser University and Saint Mary’s University.

Andrew Smith – Manitoba Bisons and Montreal Alouettes (CFL).

Jordan Yantz – CJFL all-time passing yards leader; U Sports quarterback with CFL tryouts.

Whitman Tomusiak – CJFL all-time receiving yards leader; former BC Lions receiver.
Other notable alumni include Jaiden Smith, Josh Williams, Karim Maher, Jordan Botel, Ranji Atwall, Michael Schaefer, and Quinton Bowles.

== Community and Legacy ==
The Raiders are deeply connected to Nanaimo, often referred to as the Harbour City, with strong community partnerships and outreach programs supporting youth sports, education, and local initiatives. In 2025, the organization celebrated its first ever Jr. Raiders Youth Camp, and its 20th anniversary season, marking two decades of brotherhood, growth, and championship tradition on Vancouver Island.

== Coaching staff ==
Head Coach:
Shawn Arabsky
Offensive Coordinator:
Chris Ashman
Defensive Coordinator:
Shawn Arabsky

== Executives ==
President:
Andrew Harris
Senior Consultant
Warren McCarty

== History ==
Season	W	L	T	Stn	Result
2005	8	2	0	2nd	Lost BCFC Semi-Final
2006	10	0	0	1st	Won BCFC title Won Canadian Bowl
2007	8	2	0	1st	Won BCFC title Lost Inter-Conference Final
2008	9	1	0	1st	Won BCFC title Won Inter-Conference Final; Won Canadian Bowl
2009	10	0	0	1st	Won BCFC title Won Canadian Bowl
2010	9	1	0	2nd	Won BCFC title LWon Inter-Conference Final; Lost Canadian Bowl
2011	10	0	0	1st	Won BCFC title Lost Inter-Conference Final
2012	9	0	1	1st	Lost BCFC Championship
2013	8	2	0	1st	Won BCFC title Lost Canadian Bowl
2014	5	5	0	4th	Lost BCFC Semi-Final
2015	7	3	0	2nd	Lost BCFC Championship
2016	5	4	1	4th	Lost BCFC Semi-Final
2017	6	3	1	3rd	Won BCFC title Lost Inter-Conference Final
2018	6	4	0	3rd	Lost BCFC Semi-Final
2019	5	5	0	4th	Lost BCFC Semi-Final
2020	Season cancelled due to COVID-19 pandemic.				
2021	4	4	0	4th	Season shortened due to COVID-19 pandemic.
2022	1	9	0	7th	Did not qualify for Playoffs
2023	0	10	0	7th	Did not qualify for Playoffs
2024	4	6	0	5th	Did not qualify for Playoffs
2025	5	4	1	4th	Lost BCFC Semi-Final
2026	5	5	0	4th	Lost BCFC Semi-Final
All-Time Record	128	65	4		
