= Florence (given name) =

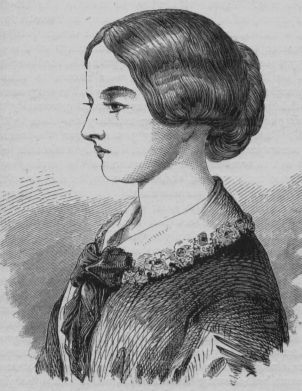
- Florence Nightingale (1820–1910) inspired the use of the name, especially in English-speaking countries.
- Pronunciation: English: /ˈflɒrəns/ FLORR-ənss; French: [flɔʁɑ̃s]
- Gender: Unisex, now primarily feminine

Origin
- Origin: English < French < Latin
- Meaning: blossoming in faith, in belief (mystic name)

Other names
- Derived: Latin, verbs florere and florens, and masculine Roman name Florentius
- Related names: Fiorenza, Flo, Florance, Florencia, Florencita, Florentia, Florrie, Floss, Flossie, Flossy, Flora, Florella, Florentina, Florentine, Florian, Florina, Floria, Florinda

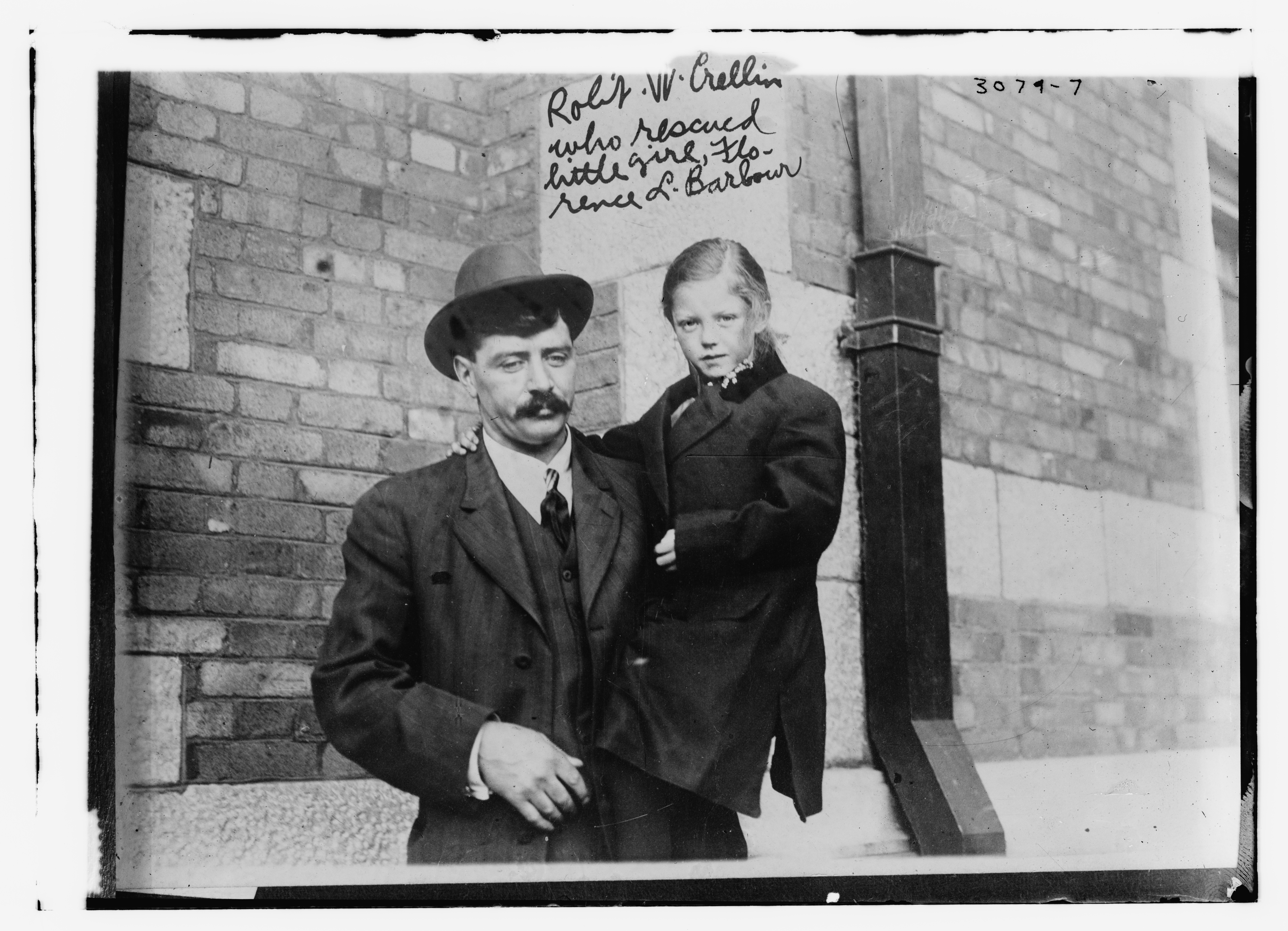
Robert W. Crellin rescued Florence L. Barbour from the sinking of the RMS Empress of Ireland on 29 May 1914 on the St. Lawrence River. Florence was among the top 10 names for girls in the United States and Canada in the early 20th century.

Florence is usually a feminine given name. It is derived from the French version of (Saint) Florentia, a Roman martyr under Diocletian. The Latin florens, florentius means "blossoming", verb floreo, meaning "I blossom / I flower / I flourish". Florence was in the past also used as a translation of the Latin version Florentius, and may be used in this context as a masculine given name.

== Popularity and history ==
A notable increased use of the name came in the aftermath of Florence Nightingale, a nurse in British hospitals during the Crimean War and is usually considered the founder of modern nursing. She was given the name because she was born in Florence, Italy. The 14th century wife of Richard de Wylughby, of London, was named Florence. A later example is Florence Wrey (d. 1718), wife of John Cole of the Irish County of Fermanagh (married in 1707), who was herself named after her mother, Florence Rolle, the wife of Sir Bourchier Wrey, 4th Baronet (c. 1653–1696) of Tawstock, Devon, and the daughter of Sir John Rolle (d. 1706) of Stevenstone, by his wife and distant cousin Florence Rolle (1630–1705), an even earlier Florence, the daughter and heiress of Denys Rolle (1614–1638), of Stevenstone and Bicton in Devon. This name is also of note because John Cole built a large mansion in Northern Ireland which he named Florence Court after his wife. John Cole's grandson, Lord Mountflorence, planted a peculiarly upright yew tree in the grounds of Florence Court, which was to become the mother tree of all Irish Yews or "Florence Court Yews".

== Usage ==
Florencia, a Spanish version, is among the most popular names for baby girls in Argentina and Uruguay. Florence was most popular in the United States between 1900 and 1940, when it was in the top 100 names given to baby girls. It then declined in use for girls after the 1970s but has been increasing in popularity. It has been ranked among the top 1,000 names for newborn American girls since 2017 and ranked in 622nd place on the popularity chart, with 473 uses, in 2022. It was among the 1,000 most popular names for American boys between 1880 and 1914. It then declined in use for boys. The name was given to seven American boys in 2022. The name has ranked among the top 100 names for newborn girls in England and Wales since 2008 and among the top 10 names for girls there since 2021. It was among the top 100 names for newborn girls in New Zealand between 1900 and 1942, after which it declined in use. It has since returned to popularity and has been among the top 100 names for girls there since 2013. It was the 39th most popular name for girls there in 2022. It has been among the top 100 names for newborn girls in New South Wales, Australia since 2016 and among the top 50 names since 2019. Florence was the 30th most popular name for newborn girls in Canada in 2021 and the fourth most popular name given to baby girls in French speaking Quebec, Canada in 2021 It dropped to 35th in Canada in 2022. In Belgium, the name ranked in 180th place on the popularity chart in 2021, a decline from its peak in popularity in 2000 and 2001, when it was among the top 100 names for newborn Belgian girls. In France, the name was among the top 500 names for girls between 1900 and 1992, and at its peak popularity between 1963 and 1973, when it was among the 20 most popular names for French girls.

== Name variants ==
Alternate forms include:

- Florance (English)
- Florentine (German)
- Fiorentina, Fiorenza (Italian)
- Florencia, Florencita, Floriana, Florinia (Spanish)
- Flóra (Hungarian)

English nicknames for Florence include Flo, Florrie and Flossie.

Florent and Florenz are masculine equivalents. Florence itself has also been used for boys (Latin Florentius), particularly in Ireland where it was used as an anglicisation of Irish Finnian or Flaithrí.

== Notable women ==
- Florence Auer (1880–1962), American actress
- Florence Austin (1884–1927), American violinist
- Florence Babb, American anthropologist
- Florence Balgarnie (1856–1928), British suffragette, speaker, pacifist, feminist, temperance activist
- Florence Ballard (1943–1976), African-American singer
- Florence Barry (1885–1965), British suffragist
- Florence Bascom (1862–1945), American geologist
- Florence Beatty-Brown (1912–2002), American sociologist
- Florence Beaumont (died 1967), one of eight Americans known to have set themselves on fire in protest of the Vietnam War
- Florence Hague Becker (1886–1971), 16th President General of the Daughters of the American Revolution
- Florence Blatrix-Contat (born 1966), French politician
- Florence Blenkiron (1904–1991), British motorcyclist and record breaker
- Florence Bolan, U.S. Secret Service special agent
- Florence Brenzikofer (born 1975), Swiss politician
- Florence V. Brittingham (1856–1891), American poet, short story writer
- Florence Bjelke-Petersen (1920–2017), politician, writer and wife of the longest serving premier Joh Bjelke-Petersen
- Florence Bore, Kenyan politician
- Florence Caddy (1837–1923), English writer
- Florence Loiret Caille (born 1975), French actress
- Florence Missouri Caton (1875–1917), British nurse who served in Serbia during World War I
- Florence Chambers (1907–1979), American swimmer
- Florence Chapell (born 2002), American animator and writer
- Florence Anderson Clark (1835–1918), American author, newspaper editor, librarian, university dean
- Florence Kingsford Cockerell 1871–1949), British calligrapher and illustrator
- Florence Abigail Cowles (1878–1958), American cookbook author and journalist
- Florence Avalon Daggett (1907–2002), American filmmaker
- Florence Daysh (1908–1979), Barbadian social worker and politician
- Florence Delay (1941–2025), French writer, translator, and actress
- Florence DiGennaro Reed, American behavior analyst
- Florence Dillsworth, Sierra Leonean educator
- Florence Dinichert (born 1977), Swiss modern pentathlete
- Florence Dissent, Anglo-Indian medical practitioner and surgeon
- Florence Dixon, American actress
- Florence Dolphyne (born 1938), Ghanaian academic and linguist
- Florence Easton (1882–1955), English opera singer
- Florence Eid-Oakden, Lebanese-British economist
- Florence Eiseman (1899–1988), American children's clothing designer
- Florence Eshalomi (born 1980), British politician
- Florence Maude Ewart (1864–1949), English violinist and composer
- Florence Ezeh (born 1977), French-Togolese hammer thrower
- Florence Faivre (born 1983), Thai actress and model
- Florence Fang (born 1933/1934), American businesswoman, publisher and philanthropist
- Florence Foster Jenkins (1868–1944), American soprano
- Florence Freeman (sculptor), American sculptor
- Florence Freeman (1911–2000), American actress
- Florence Fuller (1867–1946), Australian artist
- Florence Fulton Hobson, Irish architect
- Florence Gadesden, British headteacher
- Florence Garvin (1876–1968), American politician and women's rights activist
- Florence Gaub (born 1977), Franco-German political scientist
- Florence Gauvain, French tennis player
- Florence S. Gaynor, American nurse and hospital administrator
- Florence Gell (1906–2001), Canadian civic leader
- Florence Gerald (1858–1942), American writer, stage actress
- Florence Holmes Gerke (1896–1964), American landscape architect
- Florence Gilbert, American actress
- Florence Gill (1877–1965), British actress
- Florence Magruder Gilmore (1881–1945), American author
- Florence Giorgetti (1944–2019), French actress
- Florence Given, British artist, author, and social activist
- Florence Goodenough (1886–1959), American psychologist
- Florence Granjus (born 1962), French politician
- Florence Gravellier, French wheelchair tennis player
- Florence Graves, American investigative journalist
- Florence Green (1901–2012), last surviving veteran of World War I
- Florence Green (1862–1926), Australian headmistress
- Florence Greenberg, American music executive and producer
- Florence Griswold, American artist
- Florence Hackett (1884–1954), American silent film actress
- Florence Harding (1860–1924), wife of American president Warren G. Harding
- Florence Hartley, American writer of the Victorian era
- Florence Hay, American baseball player
- Florence Hems (died 1982), American politician
- Florence Henderson (1934–2016), American actress and singer
- Florence Hinckel, French writer
- Florence Hines, American vaudeville entertainer
- Florence Hinkle, opera singer
- Florence Hoath (born 1984), British actress
- Florence Sally Horner, the child whose kidnapping inspired and is referenced in Vladimir Nabokov's novel Lolita
- Florence Frances Huberwald, American singer, teacher, suffragist, national leader of the women's movement
- Florence Hunt (born 2007), English actress
- Florence Huntley (1861–1912), American journalist, editor, humorist, occult author
- Florence Ilott (1913–2002), British runner
- Florence Ita Giwa, Nigerian doctor and politician
- Florence Carpenter Ives (1854–1900), American journalist
- Florence Johnston, fictional character on the TV series The Jeffersons and Checking In
- Florence Griffith Joyner (1959–1998), American athlete in track and field
- Florence Kahn, American actress
- Florence Kasumba (born 1976), German actress
- Florence Kelley (1859–1932), American social reformist and feminist
- Florence King (1936–2016), Mississippi author
- Florence Klingensmith (1904–1933), American aviator
- Florence Knapp (supercentenarian) (1873–1988), American supercentenarian
- Florence E.S. Knapp (1875–1949), American politician
- Florence Knight, British chef and columnist
- Florence Knoll (1917–2019), American architect
- Florence E. Kollock (1848–1925), American Universalist minister and lecturer
- Florence LaBadie (1888–1917), Canadian silent movie actress
- Florence Lake (1904–1980), American actress
- Florence LaRue (born 1942), American actress and singer
- Florence L. Lattimore, American writer
- Florence Lawrence (1890–1938), inventor and actress, referred to as "The First Movie Star"
- Florence Winsome Leighton (1948–2024), British television presenter known as Wincey Willis
- Florence Littauer (1928–2020), American writer and public speaker
- Florence Marly (1919–1978), Czech film and television actress
- Florence Violet McKenzie (1890–1982), known as "Mrs Mac", Australia's first female electrical engineer, founder of the Women's Emergency Signalling Corps
- Florence Mills (1896–1927), actress in 1920s black theatre and the Harlem Renaissance
- Florence Mudzingwa, Zimbabwean disability rights activist
- Florence Myers (1889–1973), American politician
- Florence Nagle (1894–1988), British race horse breeder and trainer
- Florence T. Nakakuni, American attorney
- Florence Nakiwala Kiyingi, Ugandan businesswoman and politician
- Florence Namayanja, Ugandan politician
- Florence Nambozo Wamala, Ugandan politician
- Florence Nash (1888–1950), American actress and author
- Florence Nebanda, Ugandan politician
- Florence Nelson Wright, English Girl Guide leader
- Florence Newton (fl. 1661), Irish alleged witch
- Florence Nightingale (1820–1910), pioneer of modern nursing
- Florence Noiville, French author and journalist
- Florence Sillers Ogden (1891–1971), American columnist, segregationist, and white supremacist
- Florence Oloo (born 1960), Kenyan scientist and professor of chemical sciences
- Florence Y. Pan (born 1966), American judge
- Florence Pannell (1868–1980), British businesswoman and supercentenarian
- Florence Parly, French politician
- Florence Parpart, American inventor
- Florence Pernel (born 1962), French actress
- Florence Perry (1869–1949), British singer and actress
- Florence Petty (1870–1948), British cookery writer and broadcaster
- Florence Piron (1966–2021), Canadian anthropologist and ethicist
- Florence Price (1887–1953), African-American composer and teacher
- Florence Provendier (born 1965), French politician
- Florence Pugh, (born 1996), English actress
- Florence Rabier (born 1964), French meteorologist
- Florence Radzilani (born 1971), South African politician
- Florence Ravenel, American actress
- Florence Marjorie Robertson (1904–1986), British actress and singer
- Florence Ryerson, American dramatist
- Florence Sabin (1871–1953), anatomist and pathologist, first female professor at Johns Hopkins Medical School
- Florence Sangster (1890–1979), UK advertising executive
- Florence Sanudo, Duchess of the Archipelago
- Florence Senanayake (1903–1988), Sri Lankan Sinhala MP for Kiriella
- Florence Wells Slater (1864–1941), American entomologist and schoolteacher
- Florence Small (c.1860–1933), English artist
- Florence Smithburn (1904–1989), American painter
- Florence Smithson (1884–1936), English actress and singer
- Florence Smythe (1878–1925), American actress
- Florence Stephens (1881–1979), landholder and the main figure of the Huseby court case
- Florence Stoney (1870–1932), Irish physician, first female radiologist in the United Kingdom.
- Florence Sulman (1876–1965), English-Australian author and educationalist
- Florence M. Sullivan (1930–2020), New York politician
- Florence Tan (born 1977), Malaysian actress and television host
- Florence Mary Taylor (1879–1969), Australian architect and publisher
- Florence Tempest, American comedian and dancer
- Florence Timponi, American singer
- Florence Trail (1854–1944), American educator, writer
- Florence Tsagué Assopgoum (born 1977), Cameroonian political scientist and writer
- Florence Turner (1885–1946), American actress
- Florence Udell (1900–1977) President Royal College of Nursing
- Florence Kate Upton (1873–1922), American-English cartoonist and author
- Florence Vandamm (1883–1966), British photographer
- Florence Signaigo Wagner (1919–2019), American botanist who served as president of the American Fern Society
- Florence Warfield Sillers (1869–1958), American historian and socialite
- Florence Welch (born 1986), British singer and frontwoman of indie rock band Florence and the Machine
- Florence White, British pensions campaigner
- Florence White (1863–1940), English writer
- Florence White (c.1860s–1932), British painter
- Florence White Williams (1895–1953), American artist
- Florence Duval West (1840–1881), American poet
- Florence Hull Winterburn (1858–?), American author, editor
- Florence Wyman-Richardson (1855–1920), American suffragist
- Florence Yeldham, British mathematician
- Florence "Feenie" Ziner (1921–2012), American writer and educator

== Notable men ==
- Florence of Holland (died 1210), Dutch nobleman and cleric
- Florence of Worcester (died 1118), medieval chronicler
- Florence Eugene Baldwin (1825–1886), American politician
- Florance Broadhurst (1861–1909), West Australian businessman
- Florence Flor Coffey (1920–2014), Irish hurler
- Florence Conroy (1560–1629), Irish franciscan and theologian
- Florence Flor Crowley (1934–1997), Irish politician
- Florence Fitzpatrick, 3rd Baron Upper Ossory (died 1613), Irish baron
- Florence Crauford Grove (1838–1902) English mountaineer
- Florence Flor Hayes (1944–2014), Irish Gaelic footballer
- Florence Hensey (fl. 1748–1759), Irish-born French spy
- Florance Irby, 5th Baron Boston (1837–1877), British peer
- Florence Kelly, Irish bishop
- Florence M'Anoglaigh (died 1333), Irish archdeacon
- Florence MacCarthy (1560–1640), Irish prince
- Florence Macflynn, Irish bishop
- Florence MacMoyer (1662–1713), Irish bishop
- Florence O'Donoghue (1894–1967), Irish revolutionary and historian
- Florence O'Driscoll (1858–1939), Irish politician
- Florence Florrie O'Mahony (born 1933), Irish hurler
- Florence Flor O'Mahony (1946–2023), Irish politician
- Florentius Volusenus (1504–1546/7), Scottish humanist whose name is also spelled Florence Wolson, Wolsey, or Wilson
- Florence Woolley (died 1500), British bishop
- Florence Wycherley (1908–1969), Irish politician

== Fictional characters ==
- Florence Cassell, a Detective Sergeant in the television series Death in Paradise
- Florence Jean Castleberry, the titular character of the sitcom Flo
- Florence Johnston, the maid in The Jeffersons

== See also ==
- Florence (disambiguation)
- Florenz
- Florine
- Fiorenza (disambiguation)
