= Ilott =

Ilott is a surname. Notable people with the surname include:

- Callum Ilott (born 1998), British racing driver
- Florence Ilott (1913–2002), English amateur sprinter
- Mark Ilott (born 1970), English cricketer
- Nigel Ilott (born 1965), English cricketer
- Percy Ilott (1916–2001), Australian footballer
- Ray Ilott (1948–2016), Australian footballer
- Roger Ilott (born 1951), Australian folk musician
