= Common Cause (disambiguation) =

Common Cause is a watchdog group based in Washington, D.C.

(The) Common Cause may also refer to:

- Common Cause (South Australia), an organization formed during World War II to consider post-war reconstruction
- Common Cause (India), a non-governmental organization based in New Delhi
- Common Cause, the journal of the Australian Coal and Shale Employees' Federation edited by Sam Rosa
- Common Cause Magazine, a political and investigative journal founded by Florence Graves
- Common Cause Partnership, an Anglican alliance in North America
- Common cause and special cause (statistics), a concept in statistics
- Common Cause (magazine), a periodical (1947–1951) devoted to advocating world government
- Common Cause, a U.K. organization founded by C. A. Smith in 1951
- Common Cause - No Aircraft Noise, a minor Australian political party that operated from 1995 until 1999
- Spilna Sprava (English: Common Cause), a Ukrainian radical opposition group
- The Common Cause (film), a lost 1919 American silent comedy film
- The Common Cause (newspaper), a newspaper representing the views of the National Union of Women's Suffrage Societies

== See also ==
- For Common Cause, a London-based charity founded in April 2013
- Our Common Cause, (French: Notre Cause Commune, NCC), a political party in Benin
- Spurious relationship, relationship based on a shared cause
