= Florentius =

Florentius is the name of:

- Saint Florentius (died c. 310), martyr, brother of Justin of Siponto
- Florentius (consul 361), Roman praetorian prefect and consul
- Florentius (consul 429), high official of the Eastern Roman Empire
- Florentius Romanus Protogenes, Roman statesman, Consul in 449
- Florentius of Sardis, 5th century bishop of Sardis and theologian
- Florentius (African saint), exiled to Corsica in 484
- Florentius of Orange (died 525), bishop of Orange and saint
- Saint Florentius of Strasbourg, Bishop of Strasbourg c. 678–693
- Florentius of Peterborough, 7th century saint and martyr
- Florentius of Valeránica (born 918), Castilian monk, scribe and miniaturist
- Florentius of Worcester (died 1118), monk of Worcester, worked on the Chronicon ex chronicis
- Florentius of Carracedo (died 1156), Spanish Benedictine abbot
- Florentius or Florence of Holland (died 1210), nobleman and cleric, Chancellor of Scotland
- Florentius Radewyns (c. 1350–1400), co-founder of the Brethren of the Common Life
- Florentius Volusenus (1500s–1540s), Scottish humanist noted for De Animi Tranquillitate

== See also ==
- Florence (disambiguation)
