= Fiorenzo =

- Pronunciation: Italian: [fjoˈrɛntso]
- Gender: Male

Origin
- Origin: Latin
- Meaning: Florent
- Region of origin: Italy

Other names
- Nickname: Enzo

Fiorenzo is a masculine Italian given name. The feminine derivative is Fiorenza.

Notable people with the name include:

- Fiorenzo (African saint), 5th-century North African bishop and saint
- Fiorenzo Aliverti (born 1957), Italian cyclist
- Fiorenzo Angelini (1916–2014), Italian cardinal
- Fiorenzo Bava Beccaris (1831–1924), Italian general
- Fiorenzo Carpi (1918–1997), Italian composer and pianist
- Fiorenzo Chatrer (born 1987), Dutch footballer
- Fiorenzo Di Giovanni (born 1967), French rower
- Fiorenzo di Lorenzo (c. 1440 – 1522), Italian painter
- Fiorenzo Fiorentini (1920–2003), Italian actor, writer, composer, screenwriter and radio personality
- Fiorenzo Magni (1920–2012), Italian cyclist
- Fiorenzo Marini (1914–1991), Italian fencer
- Fiorenzo Maschera (1540–1584), Italian composer
- Fiorenzo Serra (1921–2005), Italian film director
- Fiorenzo Stolfi (born 1956), Sammarinese politician
- Fiorenzo Tomea (1910–1960), Italian painter

== See also ==
- Saint-Florent, Haute-Corse, a commune in Corsica, also called San Fiorenzo.
