= Florence (disambiguation) =

Florence is the capital city of the region of Tuscany, Italy, in the Metropolitan City of Florence.

Florence may also refer to:

== Places ==
=== Italy ===
- Florence Airport in the Italian city
- Republic of Florence, Renaissance-era Tuscan city-state

=== United States ===
- Florence, Alabama
- Florence, Arizona
- Florence, California
- Florence, Colorado
  - ADX Florence, a federal prison
- Florence, Illinois, a village
- Florence, Stephenson County, Illinois, an unincorporated community
- Florence, Indiana
- Florence, Kansas
- Florence, Kentucky
- Florence, Louisiana
- Florence, Maryland
- Florence, Massachusetts
- Florence, Minnesota
- Florence, Mississippi
- Florence, Missouri
- Florence, Montana
- Florence, Nebraska
- Florence, New Jersey
- Florence, New York
- Florence, Madison County, Ohio
- Florence, Oregon
  - Florence Municipal Airport
- Florence, Pennsylvania
- Florence, South Carolina
  - Florence Regional Airport
- Florence, South Dakota
- Florence, Tennessee
- Florence, Texas
- Florence, Vermont
- Florence, Washington
- Florence (CDP), Wisconsin
- Florence (town), Wisconsin
- Florence County, South Carolina
- Florence County, Wisconsin
- Florence Township (disambiguation)
- Mount Florence, Yosemite National Park, California
- Florence Peak, Sequoya National Park, California
- Florence station (disambiguation), several railway stations

=== Elsewhere ===
- Florence, Nova Scotia, Canada
- Florence, Staffordshire, England

== People ==
- Florence (given name), including a list of people with the name
- Florence (surname), a list of people with the name
- Florence (actor), French actor Nicolas-Joseph Billot de La Ferrière (1749–1816)

== Arts and entertainment ==
=== Literature ===
- Florence, a 1949 play by Alice Childress
- "Florence", a 1994 poem by Patti Smith from Early Work

=== Music ===
- Florence (album), a 2015 album by Darren Hayman
- Florence and the Machine, a British indie band

=== Other arts and entertainment ===
- Florence (video game), a 2018 interactive novel video game

== Ships ==
- USS Florence, a yacht chartered by the US Navy
- Florence (clipper), a clipper which disappeared in 1902
- USS Curlew (1862) or SS Florence, a stern-wheel steamer and gunboat

== Other uses ==
- 3122 Florence, an asteroid
- Tropical Storm Florence, various storms
  - Hurricane Florence, Atlantic storm that caused heavy damage in September 2018
- Florence (drug), a psychedelic-related compound

== See also ==
- New Florence (disambiguation)
- Sainte-Florence (disambiguation)
