= Enzo =

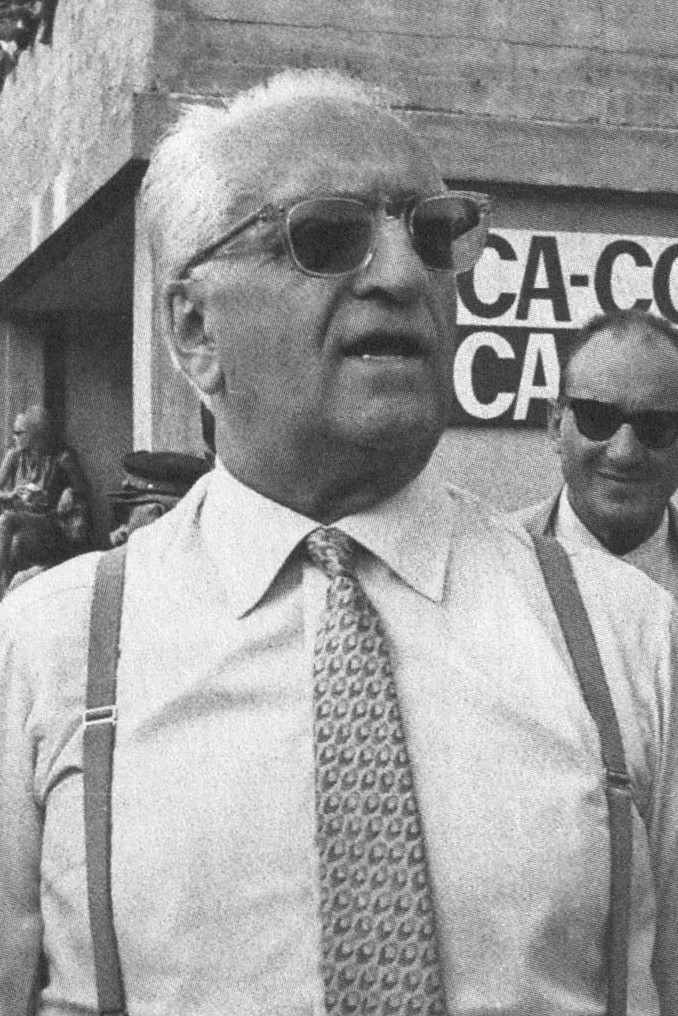
- Enzo Ferrari, founder of Ferrari and Scuderia Ferrari
- Pronunciation: Italian: [ˈɛntso]
- Gender: male

Origin
- Origin: German
- Derivation: 1. diminutive of Heinz; 2. short form for Lorenzo, Vincenzo, Innocenzo, or Fiorenzo
- Region of origin: Italy

Other names
- Pet names: Enzino (little Enzo: -ino), Enzuccio (dear Enzo: -uccio)

Enzo is an Italian given name derivative of the German name Heinz. It can be used also as the short form for Lorenzo, Vincenzo, Innocenzo, or Fiorenzo. It is most common in the Romance-speaking world, particularly in Italy and Latin America. It has also been well-used in countries such as France and Spain, where it was the most popular name for newborn boys in 2004 and 2007. Enzo has also risen in use in the United States. The name is particularly popular among Hispanic and Latino Americans.

== People ==
- Enzo Amendola (born 1973), Italian politician
- Enzo Amore (born 1986), Ring name of American professional wrestler Eric Arndt
- Enzo Bearzot (1927–2010), Italian football player and manager
- Enzo Benedetto (1905–1993), Italian painter
- Enzo Berthon (born 2000), French karateka
- Enzo Biagi (1920–2007), Italian journalist
- Enzo Boer (born 2005), Brazilian footballer
- Enzo Bottesini (born 1942), Italian journalist and actor
- Enzo Cannavale (1928–2011), Italian actor
- Enzo Calzaghe (1949–2018), Anglo-Italian boxing trainer
- Enzo Cesario (born 1980), Chilean track and road cyclist
- Enzo Couacaud (born 1995), French tennis player
- Enzo Dara (1938–2017), Italian operatic bass
- Enzo Decaro (born 1958), Italian actor, comedian, and screenwriter
- Enzo Emanuele (born 1977), Italian medical researcher and editor
- Enzo Faletto (1935–2003), Chilean sociologist
- Enzo Fernández (born 2001), Argentine footballer
- Enzo Ferrari (1898–1988), Italian race car driver, founder of Scuderia Ferrari and Ferrari S.p.A.
- Enzo Ferrari (Italian footballer) (1942–2025), Italian former footballer and manager
- Enzo Ferrari (Chilean footballer) (born 1979), Chilean former footballer and manager
- Enzo Francescoli (born 1961), Uruguayan football player
- Enzo Grothe (born 2005), Central African footballer
- Enzo Guibbert (born 1995), French racing driver
- Enzo Koffi (born 2006), French footballer
- Enzo Maccarinelli (born 1980), Welsh professional boxer
- Enzo Maiorca (1931–2016), Italian multiple record holder in free-diving
- Enzo Maresca (born 1980), Italian football player
- Enzo Mari (1932–2020), Italian artist and designer
- Enzo Muccetti (1912–1977), Italian classical bassoonist
- Enzo Osella (1939–2025), Italian racing driver and team owner
- Enzo Pérez (born 1986), Argentine midfielder football player
- Enzo Polito (1926–2004), Italian water polo player
- Enzo Roco (born 1992), Chilean football player
- Enzo Sacchi (1926–1988), Italian road bicycle and track cyclist
- Enzo Scifo (born 1966), Belgian football player
- Enzo Sciotti (1944–2021), Italian artist and illustrator
- Enzo Sereni (1905–1944), Italian-Palestinian Zionist, writer, and SOE operative
- Enzo Siviero (born 1945), Italian engineer
- Enzo Staiola (1939–2025), Italian child actor
- Enzo Stuarti (1919–2005), Italian-American singer
- Enzo Vagner (born 2006), Brazilian footballer
- Enzo Vogrincic (born 1993), actor
- Enzo Zidane (born 1995), French footballer

== Fictional characters ==
- Enzo, a side character from the video game series Bayonetta
- Enzo, Jerry's barber in the Seinfeld episode "The Barber"
- Uncle Enzo, a character in the novel Snow Crash
- Enzo Aguello, AKA Enzo the baker in The Godfather
- Enzo Favara, a protagonist in Mafia: The Old Country
- Enzo Kang, a character in To the Edge of the Sky
- Enzo Macleod, main character in book series The Enzo Files by Peter May
- Enzo Matrix, a character in the CGI television series ReBoot
- Enzo Sargassi, a boss in Ghostbusters: The Video Game (realistic versions)
- Enzo Scanno, a character in the Neapolitan Novels
- Enzo St. John, a character in the TV series The Vampire Diaries

== See also ==
- Enrico
- Enso (disambiguation)
- Enzo (dog), a star of the Frasier sitcom
- Ferrari Enzo, a sports car formerly produced by Ferrari, named after its founder
- Ozone Enzo, a competition level paraglider
