= Fiorenza =

Fiorenza is an obsolete name for Florence, used during the Middle Ages. It is also an Italian female given name, equivalent to the English Florence. It may refer to:

== People ==
- Fiorenza (name), list of people with the name

== Other ==
- Fiorenza (play), play by Thomas Mann
- 13638 Fiorenza, asteroid

== See also ==
- Fiorenzo, a given name
- Firenza
- Florence (given name)
