= Grothe =

Grothe is a surname that may refer to:

- D. J. Grothe (born 1973), American writer and public speaker
- Enzo Grothe (born 2005), Central African footballer
- Eric Grothe Jr. (born 1980), Australian rugby player
- Eric Grothe Sr. (born 1960), Australian rugby player, father of Eric Jr
- Luma Grothe (born 1993/94), Brazilian fashion model
- Matt Grothe (born 1986), American football player
- Pascal Grothe (born 1992), German politician
