= If I Had a Son for Each Star in Old Glory (Uncle Sam, I'd Give Them All to You!) =

1917 song written by James E. Dempsey and composed by Joseph A. Burke

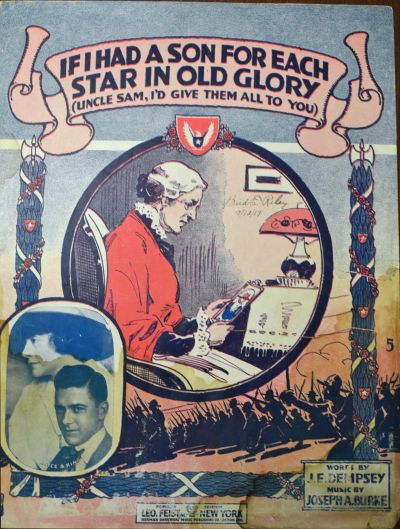
- Sheet music cover

Song
- Language: English
- Published: 1917
- Composer(s): Joseph A. Burke
- Lyricist(s): James E. Dempsey

"If I Had a Son for Each Star in Old Glory (Uncle Sam, I'd Give Them All to You!)" is a World War I song written by James E. Dempsey and composed by Joseph A. Burke. This song was published in 1917 by Leo Feist, Inc., in New York City. The sheet music cover, illustrated by Rosenbaum Studios, features a mother looking at a picture of her son with an inset photo of Monte Austin. Other editions feature Brice and King; Buddy Clark; Ben Davis; and Florence Timponi.

This song depicts the wartime sentiment of mothers expressing little concern for the lives of their sons, only the desire that they should conform to the role of protector and be the man the mother expects.

The sheet music can be found at the Pritzker Military Museum & Library.
