= Florence White =

Florence White may refer to:

- Florence White (painter) (1860s–1932), British portrait and miniature painter
- Florence White (writer) (1863–1940), British food writer
- Florence White (campaigner) (1886–1961), British pensions campaigner
