= Florence metropolitan area =

The Florence metropolitan area may refer to:

- The Florence (Firenze) metropolitan area, Italy
- The Florence, South Carolina metropolitan area, United States
- The Florence, Alabama metropolitan area, United States

== See also ==
- Florence (disambiguation)
