= Lawrence Raphael =

Professor at Adelphi University

Lawrence J. Raphael (born) is a professor in the Communications Sciences and Disorders department at Adelphi University in New York City, New York. Recently, he has become known for his cluttering research, although he has a more extensive publication record in speech production and perception. He was a research associate at Haskins Laboratories from 1970 to 1999.

Raphael's research appears in several journals including the Journal of the Acoustical Society of America. He is a co-editor of Producing Speech and co-author of Speech Science Primer and which is an introductory text on the production, acoustics, and perception of normal speech. Raphael is a Fellow of the New York Academy of Sciences and is a professor emeritus of The Graduate Center and of Lehman College of The City University of New York in their Speech Science department.

He has collaborated with Kenneth St. Louis, Florence Myers, and Klaas Bakker in recent research on cluttering.

== Bibliography ==
- Raphael, Lawrence J; Katherine S. Harris; Gloria J. Borden (2002-07-15). Speech Science Primer: Physiology, Acoustics, and Perception of Speech (5th ed.). Lippincott Williams & Wilkins. ISBN 0-7817-7117-X.
- Bell-Berti, Fredericka; Lawrence J. Raphael (1995). Producing Speech: Contemporary Issues for Katherine Safford Harris. American Institute of Physics. ISBN 1-56396-286-1.
- Raphael, Lawrence J.; Raphael, Carolyn B.; Valdovinos, Miriam R., eds. (1984). Language and Cognition: Essays in Honor of Arthur J. Bronstein. Springer. ISBN 0-306-41433-3.
