= Maschera =

Maschera (Italian: mask) may refer to:

- Maschera (band), a Japanese band
- Maschera, a genre of music introduced from Italy to Germany by William Brade
- La maschera, a film by Fiorella Infascelli (1988)
- Fiorenzo Maschera (1540-1584), Italian composer

== See also ==
- Un ballo in maschera, an 1859 opera by Giuseppe Verdi
