= Margaret Hunt =

Margaret Hunt may refer to:

- Margaret Hunt (tennis) (born 1942), South African tennis player
- Margaret Hunt Brisbane (1858–1925), American poet
- Margaret Hunt Hill (1915–2007), American heiress and philanthropist
- Margaret Raine Hunt (1831–1912), British novelist and translator
