= Fiorenza (name) =

Fiorenza is an Italian word which is used as a feminine given name and a surname. Related male name is Fiorenzo. Notable people with the name include:

== Given name ==
- Fiorenza Bassoli (1948–2020), Italian politician
- Fiorenza Calogero (born 1978), Italian musical artist
- Fiorenza Cedolins (born 1966), Italian soprano
- Fiorenza Cossotto (born 1935), Italian mezzo-soprano
- Fiorenza Donato, Italian physicist
- Fiorenza Micheli, Italian-American marine ecologist
- Fiorenza Sanudo (died 1371), Duchess of the Archipelago
- Fiorenza I Sanudo, Lady of Milos (died after 1397)
- Fiorenza Sommaripa (died 1518), Lady of Paros

== Surname ==
- Elisabeth Schüssler Fiorenza (born 1938), Romanian-German theologian
- Francis Schüssler Fiorenza (born 1941), American theologian
- Joseph Fiorenza (1931–2022), American prelate of the Catholic Church
- Nicola Fiorenza (after 1700–1764), Italian violinist and composer of the Neapolitan Baroque period
- Vito Fiorenza (1927–2015), American photographer

== See also ==
- Florence (given name)
