= Enso (disambiguation) =

An ensō is a Japanese motif.

Enso or ENSO may also refer to:

- El Niño–Southern Oscillation (ENSO), the climate phenomenon commonly known as El Niño
- Enso Oyj, a predecessor company of Stora Enso, a Finnish–Swedish pulp and paper manufacturer
- Enso, the Finnish name of the Russian town Svetogorsk
- Enso Quartet, a US-based string quartet
- Enso (software), a language-based service-oriented software invented by Aza Raskin
- SS Enso, a Finnish cargo ship in service 1950–59
- Stord Airport, ICAO code ENSO

== See also ==
- Enzo, an Italian given name
