= Antonio Bonvisi =

Antonio Bonvisi (died 1558) was an Anglo-Italian merchant in London. He was also a banker, and employed by the English government, as well as being an agent for the Italians appointed as Bishop of Worcester. He was on good terms with the English humanists of the time, and a close friend of Thomas More.

== Life ==
His family was settled in England before his time, and he perhaps was born there, as his denization does not appear to be on the patent rolls. In 1513 he was already a thriving merchant, and laying the foundation of the great wealth for which he was famous. In that year he received from the king, Henry VIII, a remission of customs for five years in repayment of a loan to the crown. He dealt largely in wool, and also imported jewels and other foreign articles, for which Cardinal Wolsey was one of his principal customers.

He acted as banker for the government, transmitting money and letters to ambassadors in France, Italy, and elsewhere, and sometimes through his correspondents obtaining earlier news of foreign events than the government did. He was a patron and friend of learned men, more especially of those who had visited and studied in Italy. Thomas Starkey, Thomas Wynter, Florence Volusenus, and others express their obligations to him. Sir Thomas More, in one of his last letters from the Tower of London, speaks of himself as having been for nearly forty years 'not a guest, but a continual nursling of the house of Bonvisi,' and styles Antonio the most faithful of his friends. Reginald Pole also spoke highly of him; when Mary came to the throne, Bonvisi acted as intermediary with Pole. He helped William Peto, who had fled to the Low Countries after preaching a sermon against King Henry VIII.

He resided at London, in Crosby Hall, Bishopsgate Street (Crosbyes Place it was then called). He at first leased it from the priory of St. Helen's, a lease he bought from More. After the dissolution of the priory, he purchased it from the king, together with a house in St. Mary Axe and the site of a friary in Moulsham, near Chelmsford. This was in the period 1538 to 1542. The house in St. Mary Axe he sold to Balthazar Guercy, a distinguished fellow of the College of Physicians, and formerly medical attendant to Queen Catherine of Aragon. At the beginning of the reign of Edward VI he settled his affairs, and later left for the continent; the lease of Crosby House he made over to his tenants William Roper and William Rastell, and he also conveyed the ownership; but almost all involved were Catholics who went into exile before he did. The house, with those of Dr John Clement and Guercy, was seized by the sheriffs of London, on 7 February 1550, and came into the hands of Thomas Darcy, 1st Baron Darcy of Temple Hurst. Bonvisi soon recovered it, during the reign of Queen Mary.

In the general pardon which concluded the acts of the parliament of 7 Edward VI (1553) he was specially excepted, together with Cardinal Pole, the two doctors above mentioned, John Story, and a few others. He died on 7 December 1558, and was buried at Leuven, leaving a nephew Benedict Bonvisi, son of his brother Martin, to inherit his English property.
