= Bill Scott (author) =

Australian author, folklorist and poet

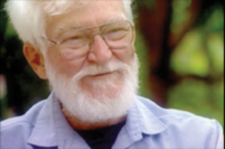
- Bill Scott
- Born: William Neville Scott; 4 October 1923; Bundaberg, Queensland
- Died: 22 December 2005 (aged 82); Warwick, Queensland
- Occupations: Author, Folklorist, Poet

William Neville Scott OAM (4 October 1923 – 22 December 2005) was an Australian author, folklorist, songwriter, poet, and collector of bush ballads and Australian folk history. He has published anthologies of Australian bush songs, including the best selling book The Complete Book of Australian Folklore published in 1976. He was awarded the Order of Australia in 1992 for his contributions to folklore, folk music, and Australian literature. He was considered a living treasure, and his anthologies of songs and his donated collections continue his legacy.

== Childhood and early career ==
Bill Scott was born in Bundaberg, Queensland, and grew up in Caboolture and Brisbane. He began writing poetry while serving in the Royal Australian Navy during World War II and had his first poem published in The Bulletin in 1944 when he was twenty-one.

After the war he traveled around Queensland working as a sugar cane cutter, umbrella maker, steam-engine driver, and gold-prospector. He was also a worker in the smelters of Mount Isa, and a seaman on a lighthouse tender in the 1950s before working at a publishing house.

Starting in 1974 he wrote full-time. In 1976 he compiled The Complete Book of Australian Folklore, a book that has been in print almost continuously ever since. He also edited and compiled The Second Penguin Australian Songbook. Scott completed 51 books of prose and poetry, and is renowned as a collector and writer of Australian folk stories and songs. He also wrote novels, short stories, verse, biographies, magazine articles, anthologies and songs, with some of his poetry and short stories anthologised in various collections.

Late in life he moved from Brisbane to Warwick in the Darling Downs, where he spent his last 18 years of life. He wrote long letters "full of stories, news, ideas and weather reports from his beloved Condamine River". He shared little gifts, tapes, books and even a rock of smoky quartz from the Snowy Mountains, as a reminder of his prospecting days, with friends.

== Accomplishments ==
Many of his poems are well known and recited by school children. Scott was also a founding member of the Queensland Folk Federation that now runs the Woodford Folk Festival. Ian McNamara of ABC Radio said, "We as people are all better off for the muse of a bloke like Bill."

His song Hey Rain was used as the namesake for the documentary on his 50-year "folkie" career, with the subtitle The songs and stories of Bill Scott. The documentary has been featured on ABC's Sunday afternoon program. ABC's description of the show notes, "Continuing the tradition of Australian bush poets like Henry Lawson and Banjo Paterson is... Bill Scott. A popular performer at the Woodford Folk Festival over the years where most of this documentary is set, this is an affectionate look at a charming man with a lot of great memories." The documentary's liner notes say, "He's a story teller, he's Bill Scott, and this is his song".

An obituary in Folklore suggested the refrain of his poem "The Old Man's Song" as an epitaph: "What good is your life if it isn't a song?"

== Hey Rain documentary ==
First broadcast on the ABC in 2005, Hey Rain is a documentary that celebrates the life and works of Bill Scott. "It looks at Bill's lifelong fascination with Australian folklore and the role he played in collecting it, loving it and bringing it to an ever widening audience. (It) touches on Bill's poems, stories and songs and contains performances by Dave de Hugard, Penny Davies and Roger Ilott, and it also features a song dedicated to Bill by that extraordinary performer, Ted Egan."

== Bibliography ==
N°	Name	Published	Notes	ISBN
1	Focus On Judith Wright	1967		
2	Some People	1968	Collection of short stories.	
3	Brother And Brother	1968	Collection of Poems.	0701603550
4	The Continual Singing: An Anthology Of World Poetry	1973	as editor. Collection of Poems.	070160686X
5	Complete Book Of Australian Folklore	1976		0725403381
6	Bushranger Ballads	1976	with Pro Hart.	0701813369
7	Portrait of Brisbane	1976	with Cedric Emanuel.	0727002244
8	My Uncle Arch And Other People	1977	Collection of short stories.	0727004484
9	Boori	1978	Novel for young adults.	0195505506
10	Tough In The Old Days	1979		0727009893
11	The Second Penguin Australian Songbook	1980	as editor.	0140700846
12	Darkness Under The Hills	1980	Novel for young adults.	0195542746
13	Ned Kelly After A Century Of Acrimony	1980	with John Meredith.	0701814705
14	Impressions On A Continent	1983	as editor. Collection of Australian short stories.	0858593289
15	Penguin Book Of Australian Humorous Verse	1984	as editor.	0140423214
16	Shadows Amongst The Leaves	1984	Novel for young adults	0858593750
17	Australian Bushrangers	1983		0867773782
18	The Long & The Short & The Tall	1985		094946001X
19	Following The Gold	1989	Collection of poems.	0140340068
20	Many Kinds Of Magic	1990	Collection of short stories.	0670829714
21	The Currency Lad	1994		0949183849
22	Pelicans & Chihuahuas And Other Urban Legends	1996		0702227749
23	Lies, Flies And Strange Big Fish	2000	Collection of short stories.	1865083577
24	See What I've Got: The Bill Scott Reciter	2001		0957868103

== Song collections ==
- Bushranger Ballads (1976)
- The Second Australian Song Book (1980)
- Tape-recordings of his songs: "Hey, Rain!" and "Songbird in Your Pocket"
- CD of his songs Opal Miner - The Songs of Bill Scott recorded by Penny Davies and Roger Ilott in 1999 on Restless Music label
- Expanded CD of his songs accompanies DVD Hey Rain - The Songs and Stories of Bill Scott documentary seen on ABC TV
