= Margaret Hunt Brisbane =

American poet

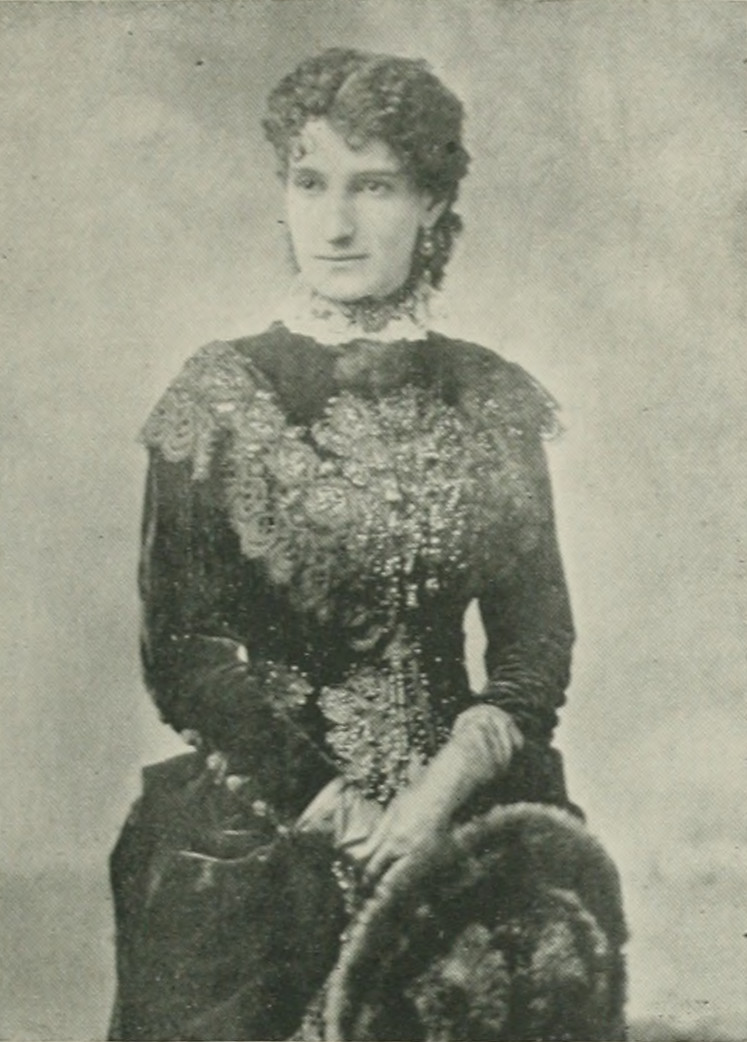
- Photo in A Woman of the Century
- Born: Margaret Hunt; February 11, 1858; Vicksburg, Mississippi, U.S.
- Died: January 5, 1925 (aged 66); New Orleans, Louisiana, U.S.
- Occupation: poet
- Spouse: Howard P. Brisbane (m. 1883)
- Writing career
- Pen name: Johny Hunt; Mrs. Johny Hunt Brisbane
- Notable work: Poems by Margaret Hunt Brisbane

Margaret Hunt Brisbane (née, Hunt; after marriage, Hunt, though also known as, Mrs. Howard; pen names, Johny Hunt and Mrs. Johny Hunt Brisbane; February 11, 1858 – January 5, 1925) was an American poet of the Confederacy. She was also a magazine writer of national repute, and a popular contributor to New Orleans newspapers. A native of Vicksburg, Mississippi, she came from a literary family. She was married in 1883, and for many years made her home in New Orleans. Poems by Margaret Hunt Brisbane was published in 1925.

== Early life and education ==
Margaret Hunt was born in Vicksburg, February 11, 1858. (Note: Lloyd (1981) records that Margaret Hunt was born "about 1856".) She was the youngest daughter of Col. Harper P. Hunt, a Southerner, whose wife was Margaret Tompkins, a member of a well-known Kentucky family of that name. Her childhood was spent enjoying outdoor sports at the "old house on the hill," as the Hunt mansion was called. She grew up with a poetic temperament, fully developed by her surroundings.

== Career ==
Early in life, Brisbane began to express her musings in verse, and some of her earliest poems gave evidence of the poetical qualities she revealed in her later and more important work. Mississippians were proud of her achievements in literature. "Easter day" and "With you" were published in 1905. Her "Silhouettes" describe the Siege of Vicksburg she experienced in childhood. Brisbane published using pseudonyms including "Johny Hunt" and "Mrs. Johny Hunt Brisbane". She was a member of the Mississippi Press Association, a frequent contributor to the newspapers in Mississippi while she lived in the State, and after her removal to New Orleans, contributed poems to various leading periodicals.

Brisbane was a versatile woman who sympathized with women's causes. She was a leader in Vicksburg society. She was a member of the Daughters of the American Revolution.

== Personal life ==
In 1883, she married Dr. Howard P. Brisbane, of New York City, a grandson of Albert Brisbane, of Brook Farm fame. After marriage, they moved to New Orleans. Their family consisted of three children, Sherad Brisbane, Miles Brisbane, Mrs. David Comers, Jr.; and an adopted son, Hunt Capers.

She died in New Orleans, January 5, 1925. Poems by Margaret Hunt Brisbane (Boston, 1925) were published posthumously by Florence Frances Huberwald.

== Selected works ==
- Poems (Boston, 1925)
