= Florence station =

Florence station may refer to:

- Florence station (South Carolina), an Amtrak train station in Florence, South Carolina
- Florence station (Los Angeles Metro), a Los Angeles Metro Rail light rail station and former Pacific Electric interurban station in Los Angeles, California
- Florence station (River Line), a River Line light rail station in Florence Township, New Jersey

== See also ==
- Firenze Santa Maria Novella railway station, the main railway station in Florence, Italy
- Florence (disambiguation)
