= Moulsham =

Suburb of Chelmsford, Essex, England

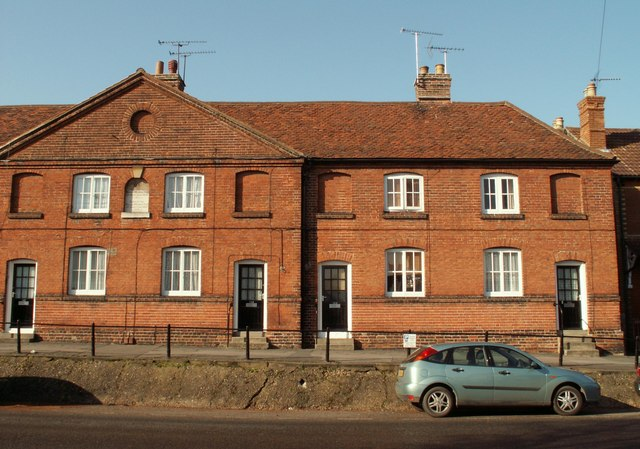
Brick houses on Moulsham Street, 2008

Moulsham is a suburb of Chelmsford, Essex, England. It is located to the south of the city centre and has two distinct areas: Old Moulsham and Moulsham Lodge.

== History ==
Moulsham is located on the south side of the River Chelmer. Moulsham Street follows the line of the former Roman road and it is a designated Conservation Area.

=== Roman – early Moulsham ===
The fertile Chelmer Valley has been a focus for human activities from the beginning of the Neolithic period (c.4000BC), with ceramics of this period having been found during excavation in the Moulsham Street area. These excavations also revealed evidence for settlement through the Bronze Age and late Iron Age. Significant habitation at Moulsham can be traced back to Roman times, preceding the origins of Chelmsford itself. Moulsham Street is perhaps the oldest street in the city.

Soon after the rebellion of Boudica in AD 60, a small Roman military fort was built on the southern banks of the River Can near an important road bridge crossing midway between Colchester and London. A civilian town soon grew up around the fort and received the name Caesaromagus (Caesar's Market Place). The present Moulsham Street follows the line of the main thoroughfare through the Roman town southwards to London. Long after the fort had gone, the Romans maintained an official presence in Moulsham, in the form of a grand mansion (located in the vicinity of what is now Roman Road), which served as a post office, civic centre and hotel. Roman occupation of Moulsham centred on the area defined by what are now Moulsham Street/Hall Street/Hamlet Road and Mildmay Road. The town was defended by substantial banks and ditches and contained public baths and a temple.

The Roman town was abandoned in the 5th Century AD. The nearest centres of population at this time would have been small Saxon farmsteads to the north of what is now Chelmsford. Following the collapse of the Roman wooden bridge across the River Can, the main route between Colchester and London was diverted to a crossing point at Widford several miles west of Moulsham.

=== Norman – the birth of Chelmsford ===
After the Norman Conquest of 1066, Moulsham was owned by the Abbot of Westminster; the land on the Chelmsford side of the River Can was owned by the Bishop of London. Records at this time refer to a place named Ceolmaer's Ford on the northern banks of the Can. Around AD 1100 a new bridge was constructed across the River Can restoring the route of the old Roman road along what is now Moulsham Street. In AD 1199 Chelmsford was formally founded by the Bishop of London, William of Sainte-Mère-Église when he was granted the right to hold a weekly market at ‘Chelmersford’ around which a new town was formed.

In the years that followed Moulsham remained a distinct hamlet separate from Chelmsford. Rivalry between the Abbot of Westminster and the Bishop of London resulted in the growth of Chelmsford into a prosperous trading centre, while Moulsham became the poor relation, accommodating the destitute and socially unacceptable members of the community, at one time containing a leper colony, much later a gaol and workhouse.

=== Tudor – Moulsham hamlet ===
A Dominican friary was built at the north end of Moulsham (in the vicinity of what is now Friar's Walk) between 1221 and 1277, and this survived until the Dissolution of the Monasteries in 1538 when the friary and later the manor of Moulsham were purchased by the Mildmay family. In 1563 the same family also acquired the manor of Chelmsford from Queen Elizabeth I, resulting in Moulsham and Chelmsford being owned by the same lord. The Mildmay family lived at Moulsham Hall, a large mansion in grounds to the south of what was to become Old Moulsham on land that is now a residential neighbourhood known as Moulsham Lodge.

Thomas Mildmay, who died in 1566, was a benefactor to King Edward VI Grammar School, Chelmsford. The Mildmay family effectively controlled Chelmsford for almost 300 years. Moulsham developed into a modest village and a number of the buildings that remain still show their mediaeval origin. The Walker map of Moulsham hamlet in 1591 shows a ribbon of timber-framed houses extending from the Can to a field entrance in the vicinity of what is now Anchor Street.

=== Victorian – Industry, commerce and social activity ===
Chelmsford has a large number of pubs, many of which are relatively old with their roots in the coaching days. The number of pubs in and around Moulsham Street was boosted in the nineteenth century, no doubt in response to the presence of soldiers in the town (the barracks occupying the site of the old friary at the town end of Moulsham Street) and the continued growth of Chelmsford reflecting the town's increasing importance as a market and retail centre. Moulsham Street still supports many pubs. Judge Tindal is perhaps Moulsham Street's most famous son. Tindal was a renowned judge who became Lord Chief Justice in 1829 and is now remembered with a bronze statue in Tindal Square at the top of Chelmsford High Street. He was born at 199 Moulsham Street in 1776. The stone bridge linking Chelmsford High Street and Moulsham Street was built in 1787, replacing an earlier bridge and is one of the city's most enduring landmarks. It was constructed by County Surveyor John Johnson, also responsible for the city's landmark ‘Shire Hall’. Moulsham gained its own church in 1837 when St John's was constructed opposite Anchor Street on the south side of Moulsham Street at a cost of £2,500. The square tower, a local landmark, was added in 1883.

In 1839 the Mildmay estate and adjoining land to the south became available for purchase, which enabled the rapid and significant expansion of Chelmsford. At this time a group of local enterprising (non-conformist) businessmen surreptitiously acquired land in several lots, and were thus able to form what is now New London Road, disposing of plots with strict covenants to realise a grand design: ‘a handsome road of highly ornamental mansions’ as an elegant approach to Chelmsford. Whilst it followed a parallel alignment, New London Road was not a ‘by-pass’ of Moulsham Street in the modern sense of the word; rather it was constructed as an alternative route with its new residences enabling merchandisers to move ‘out of town’. Moulsham was effectively swallowed by Chelmsford during Victorian expansion of the town.

The influx of people into the area led to a school being constructed next to St John's Church in 1840, which was extended in 1885. Previously, the British School close to the site of the former friary was one of only two or three schools in the town. During the mid-nineteenth century several pockets of industry, focused on manufacturing, were established in and around Moulsham Street. This included Marconi's and Crompton's – two of Chelmsford's ‘big three’ manufacturers responsible for giving the town an international reputation.

In 1878 Colonel REB Crompton established the country's first electrical engineering works at his Arc Works in Anchor Street, a site that had been in industrial use principally as an iron works since 1833. Crompton was a pioneer of electric lighting schemes, ‘Devon House’ in Anchor Street was constructed in 1890 as a power station to provide electric lighting for Chelmsford's main streets. In 1895 Crompton's relocated to Writtle Road after a fire. The vacant factory was occupied in 1902 by Clarkson's, who made steam omnibuses at the site until 1917 and branched out into bus operating as ‘National’ converting to petrol buses in 1920 – the name surviving in the town and beyond until the 1990s.

In 1898, Guglielmo Marconi set up the world's first radio factory in Hall Street in a furniture shop, itself a converted Silk Mill adjacent to water board premises. Radio equipment was manufactured and shipped around the world from an expanding operation in Hall Street until Marconi's moved to new premises in New Street, Chelmsford in 1912. Marconi's retained a presence in Chelmsford until the late 1990s, employing several thousand local people in its heyday.

Other industries operating in the late nineteenth century in and around Moulsham Street included rope and tent makers (Godfreys established 1828, wound up 1985), brickworks, ironworks, furniture manufacturing and builder's yard/offices.

By the late nineteenth century Moulsham Street had also become a busy shopping street, lined with cycle shops, butchers, newsagents, tailors, grocers, animal feed merchants, a confectioner, a pharmacist, cafés and taverns. Its relative narrowness, domestic scale and varied architecture gave the street an intimate ‘village’ feel. This and the mixed use function of the street persist to the present day whilst heavy industries have all but gone away.

== Commercial & Retail ==
The northern end of Moulsham Street consists of many small retail outlets which are often independently run and are represented by the Moulsham Traders Association. There are many offices along New London Road, often housing professionals, such as real estate agents, renewable energy companies, solicitors and accountants. Moulsham Lodge has a shopping parade of a dozen units catering for needs of the immediate estate and the adjoining area of Tile Kiln, also containing a small parade of five shops and a pub, which lies between Moulsham Lodge and Galleywood.

== Education ==
There are several schools and colleges within Moulsham. These include: Moulsham Infant School, Oaklands Infant School, Moulsham Junior School, St Anne's Preparatory School, St Philip's Priory School, St. Cedd's Primary School, Our Lady Immaculate RC Primary School, Moulsham High School and Chelmsford College.

== Sport, Leisure & Recreation ==
Sports facilities include: the Grove Tennis Club, the privately owned Spring Health Leisure Club and the council run Dovedale Leisure Centre. There is Oaklands Park, with 12 acres (49,000 m^{2}) of grounds containing the Chelmsford Museum. In between Old Moulsham and Moulsham Lodge is John Shennan Playing field, built on top of a disused refuse tip. The city council is now undertaking mass tree planting on sections of the playing field in line with city council biodiversity targets.

== Places of Worship ==
Many Christian denominations are represented within Moulsham. Churches include the Methodist, Church of England St John the Evangelist and St Luke's; the United Reformed Church Christ Church, the Roman Catholic Our Lady Immaculate, Presbyterian, Union of Evangelical Church and Elim. Moulsham's memorial to those who died during the First World War is located at the front of St John's Church. Of note local historical interest is Grove Road Evangelical Church, which was a former Peculiar People's chapel. There is also a mosque at the junction with New London Road.

== Notable Inhabitants and people connected to the area ==
- Nicholas Conyngham Tindal
- David Rossdale
- Francesco Sleter
- Walter Mildmay
- Antonio Bonvisi
- John Rogers (c. 1570–1636)
- Giacomo Leoni
- Hilda Grieve
- Alice Barnham.
