= Florenz =

- Gender: Unisex

Other names
- Related names: Florence

Florenz may refer to:

- Florenz Ames (1883-1958), American film and theater actor, dancer, and singer
- Florenz Regalado (born 1928), Associate Justice of the Supreme Court of the Philippines
- Florenz Ziegfeld (1867–1932), American Broadway impresario
- Karl-Heinz Florenz (born 1947), German Member of the European Parliament
- The German name for Florence, Italy

== See also ==
- Florence (disambiguation)
