= Florence Nebanda =

Ugandan politician

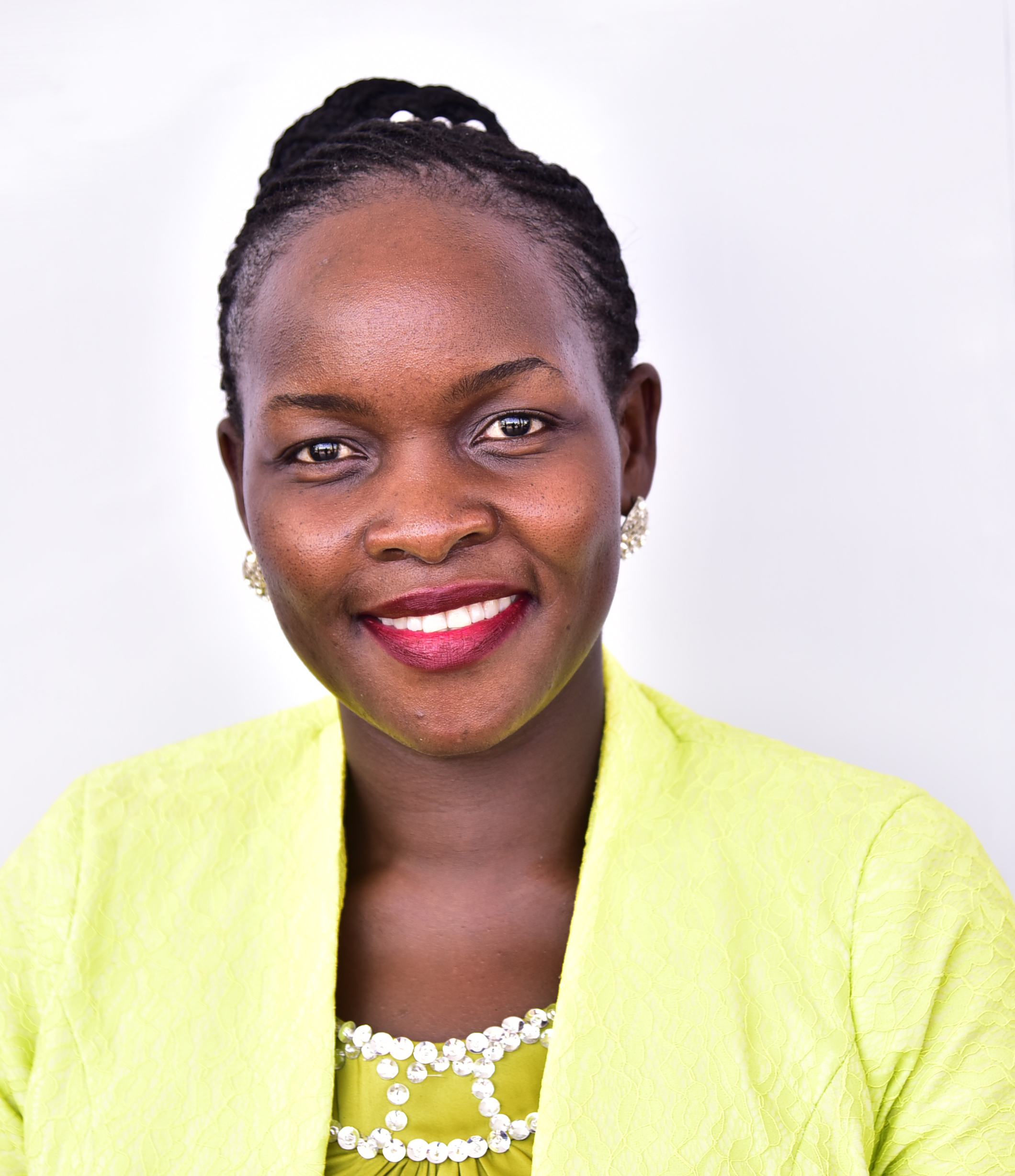
- Born: 9 October 1986 (age 39); Entebbe, Uganda
- Citizenship: Uganda
- Education: BA in Human Resources Management; Undisclosed Institution in The UK; MA in Human Resources Management; Undisclosed Institution in The UK
- Occupation: Politician
- Years active: 2013 – present
- Known for: Politics
- Title: Member of Parliament; Parliament of Uganda

Florence Andiru Nebanda, commonly known as Florence Nebanda, is a Ugandan politician and Legislator. She is the Woman Member of Parliament, representing Butaleja District in the Parliament of Uganda. She was elected to that position in February 2013, replacing her younger sister, Cerinah Nebanda, who died in office in December 2012. In 2021, she was re elected to the same position.

== Early life and education ==
Florence Nebanda is a firstborn of the family of eight (one boy and seven girls) and she was born on 9 October 1986 in Entebbe to the late Peter Waiga and Alice Namulwa. She attended Ugandan schools until Senior six completing her UACE from Katikamu SDA Secondary School in Wobulenzi, Luwero district in 2013. She relocated to the United Kingdom to pursue further studies. She returned to Uganda when her sister Cerinah Nebanda died in December 2012. She is reported to hold the BA in Human Resources Management attained from the University of East London in 2008 and a MA in International Human Resources Management, from the University of Bedfordshire in the United Kingdom.

== Career ==
On 14 December 2012, Cerinah Nebanda, the elected Member of Parliament for the Butaleja Women's Constituency died suddenly, rendering that position vacant. In the by-election to fill her seat, her elder sister, Florence Andiru Nebanda won on the National Resistance Movement political party ticket. She will serve the remainder of that term until the general elections of March 2016. She was also a member of the Budget and Presidential Affairs Committee.

== Personal life ==
Nebanda loves netball as one of her hobbies, her being part of the parliamentary Netball Competition while in the 9th parliament. She also reads novels and the Bible.

== See also ==
- Parliament of Uganda
- Butaleja District
- Member of Parliament.
- National Resistance Movement
- List of members of the eleventh Parliament of Uganda
- List of members of the ninth Parliament of Uganda
