= Francis Hems =

American politician (died 1961)

Member of the Connecticut House of Representatives from Middlefield
- In office 1959 – November 18, 1961
- Preceded by: Joseph G. Lombardo
- Succeeded by: Florence Hems

Personal details
- Born: Meriden, Connecticut, U.S.
- Died: November 18, 1961
- Party: Democratic
- Spouse: Florence Hems

Francis W. Hems (died November 18, 1961) was an American politician who served in the Connecticut House of Representatives from 1959 to his death in 1961, representing the town of Middlefield as a Democrat. His wife, Florence Hems, succeeded him in a special election and served the remainder of his unexpired term.
