= Susan Kinyua =

Kenyan economist

Susan Kìnyua
- Born: c.1970 Meru
- Occupation: Economist
- Employer: Barclay's Bank
- Known for: Won the 2024 Harambee Award for the Promotion and Equality of African Women

Susan Kìnyua (born c. 1970) is a Kenyan economist known for her work in Africa. She won the 2024 Harambee Award for the Promotion and Equality of African Women.

== Life ==
Kìnyua was born in Meru in about 1970 where she one of five children. There were four sisters and her brother, and, unusually, her parents did not invest all their efforts to promote her brother's education, as she and her sisters also had the same offer. She went to work for Barclay's Bank after studying economics, but she left a well paid job to work with women at the Kìanda Foundation.

In 2024, Kìnyua received the Harambee Award for the Promotion and Equality of African Women. The ceremony was chaired by Teresa de Borbón-Dos Sicilias y Borbón-Parma. The award was in recognition of her work directing projects at the Kìanda Foundation. Another Kenyan, Professor Florence Oloo, had won the award the previous year.

Kìnyua's prize of 10,000 euros was given to the Foundation's Fanikisha project, which she leads. The project is training 4,500 potential entrepreneurs in Kenya. She began work with Fanikisha (breakthrough in English) in 2003.

In 2025, Kìnyua led a project which aimed to inspire 800 women in Kenya with not only business skills but the necessary work to allow them to cope with any issues that may arise. Kìnyua has taken a course in psychotherapy, as she realizes the importance of supporting her charges. The three year project is named Mwangaza, which is Swahili for "light". Each of the women on the project are mentored and they, their family and their finances are supported. This was an important part of Mwangaza the project as they believe that education cannot be delivered if the students are concerned about other issues.
