= Simminensis (diocese) =

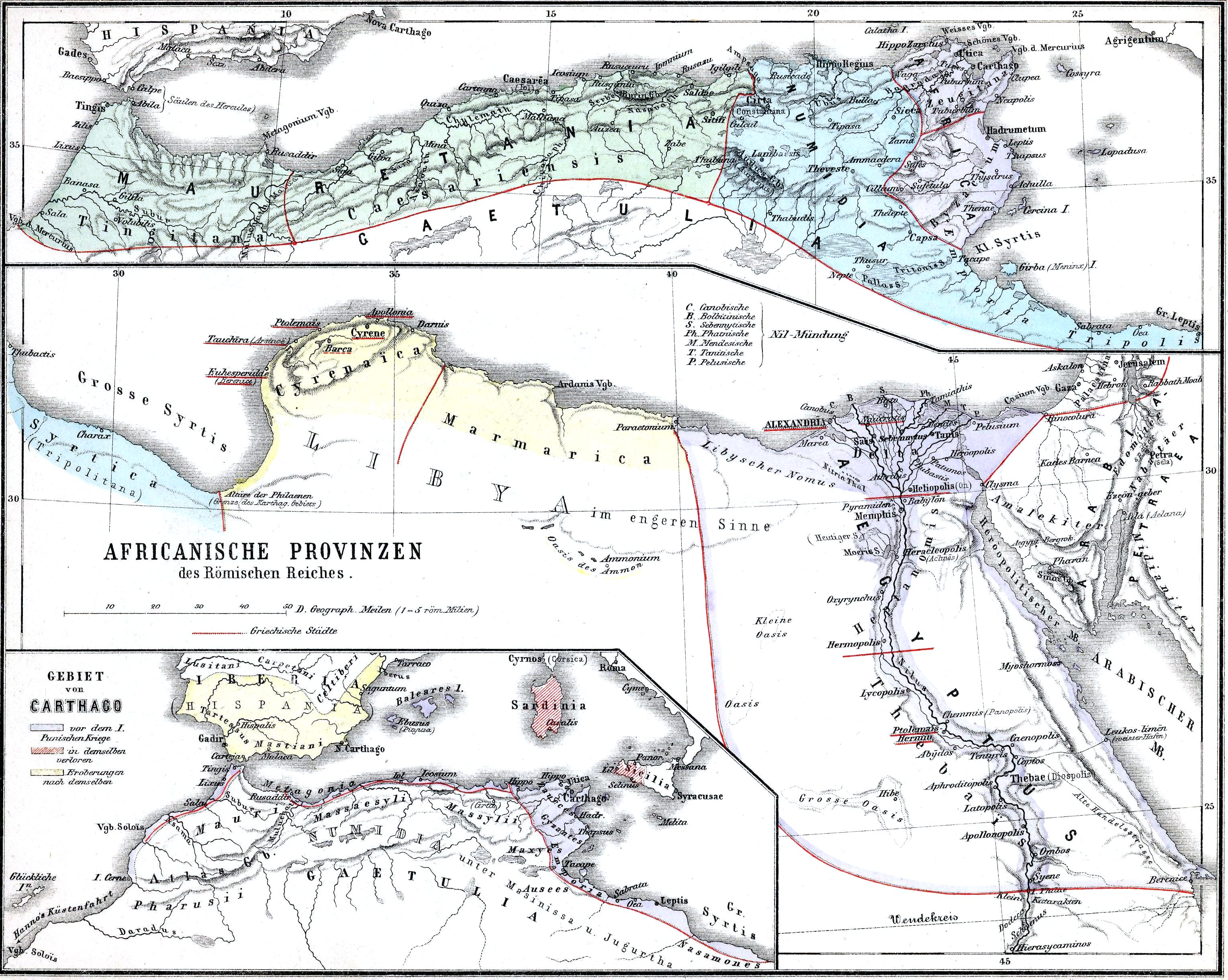
Roman North Africa

Simminensis is an ancient and titular episcopal see of the Roman province of Africa Proconsularis in modern Tunisia, and a suffragan diocese of the Archdiocese of Carthage.

== Etymology ==
Simminensis, also known as Siminina, Siminensis, or Simminensis, means "to sow".

== History ==
Semina is today a titular diocese in the Proconsolare of Carthage. and a number of titular bishops have sat in 20th century. Founded in the Roman era only one bishop is known for certain from antiquity, St. Fiorenzo, who participated in the Council of Carthage (484) convened by the Vandal king Huneric, after which he was exiled to Corsica . Two other ancient bishops from the city are also inferred from literary sources. The first Deuterium Simminensis is mentioned in the Notitia Africae of 484AD, while the second Iunianus or Martin took part in the Council of Carthage (525).

The bishopric is mentioned by Anonymous of Ravenna.

=== Known bishops ===
- Rudolf Pierskała (Titular bishop: 7 Dec 2013 – )
- Ján Orosch (Titular bishop: 2 Apr 2004 to 11 Jul 2013)
- Timothy Anthony McDonnell (Titular bishop: 30 Oct 2001 to 9 Mar 2004)
- Thomas Khamphan † (Titular bishop: 10 Jul 1975 to 26 Jul 2001)
- Pierluigi Sartorelli † (Titular archbishop: 9 Nov 1967 to 7 Oct 1972)
- Bishop Florients
- The Notitia Africae also names one Deuterius from Simminensis However, it is uncertain if he was Bishop of Simminensis or if he was from the town and bishop elsewhere.
- Another, Plebis, or Martin of Siminensis took part in the Council of Carthage (525).

== Location ==
The exact location of Simminensis is unknown. It would appear to have been somewhere on the north-western coast of Cap Bon 30 km east of Carthage. It is held by some to be at Mraissa. Babelon, however, suspected its location at Dagla, Tunisia. While Tissot in turn suspected the ancient city to the south, at Henchir Bir Djedi.
