= Florent =

Florent is a French version of the Latin personal name Florentius. It is also used as a surname.

== People with the first name ==
- Florent Amodio (born 1990), French figure skater
- Florent Atem (born 1979), French Polynesian guitarist and academic
- Florent Avdyli (born 1993), Kosovan footballer
- Florent Aziri (born 1988), Kosovan-German footballer
- Florent Bax (born 1999), French tennis player
- Florent Cunier (1812–1853), Belgian ophthalmologist and physician
- Florent Hadergjonaj (born 1994), Kosovan footballer
- Florent Hasani (born 1997), Kosovan footballer
- Florent Hoti (born 2000), Kosovan-British footballer
- Florent Lambrechts (1910–1990), Belgian footballer
- Florent Mabille (born 1996), Belgian sprinter
- Florent Malouda (born 1980), French footballer and coach
- Florent Manaudou (born 1990), French competitive swimmer, an Olympic champion of the 50-meter freestyle at the 2012 London Olympics, and the younger brother of Laure Manaudou
- Florent Mothe (born 1981), French musician, singer, and actor
- Florent Muslija (born 1998), Kosovan footballer
- Florent Pagny (born 1961), French recording artist and singer
- Florent Schmitt (1870–1958), French composer
- Florent Shehu (born 2002), French footballer
- Florent Sinama Pongolle (born 1984), French association football player

== People with the surname ==
- Andrew Florent (1970–2016), Australian tennis player
- François Florent, stage name of François Eichholtzer (1937-2021), French theater actor
- Guillaume Florent (born 1973), French sailor and Olympic athlete
- Hélène Florent (born 1974), Canadian actress
- Oliver Florent (born 1998), Australian footballer

== Places ==
- Florent (restaurant), former diner in Manhattan, United States
- Cours Florent, drama school in Paris, France

== See also ==
- Saint-Florent (disambiguation)
