= Penny Davies and Roger Ilott =

Australian musical duo

Penny Davies (born 1953) and Roger Philip Ilott (born 1951), are folk musicians from Queensland, Australia.

They formed their duo in 1983 and began their own label Restless Music. Their music is steeped in tradition yet influenced strongly by the folk rock music of their personal musical history. They are songwriters as well as interpreters of Australian folk.

Davies and Ilott are best known for their collaborations with the poet Bill Scott, creating many songs based on his works. This includes the album Opal Miner - The Songs of Bill Scott.

Davies and Ilott's songs have also featured on the ABC albums Australia All Over Volumes One and Two,, Macca On Air, Macca's Sunday Best and Macca By Request - Volumes 1 and 2.

They have released more than 20 albums on their Restless label. They have been featured artists at folk festivals, in Woodford, Sydney, Sawtell, New South Wales, Yagubi, Illawarra, Bulli, New South Wales, Cabarlah, Helidon and Glen Innes, New South Wales. They have also performed at National Folk Festivals, and toured extensively for the Queensland Arts Council, visiting more than 70 outback and Far North Queensland towns.

== Partial Discography ==
- 1983: Restless LP (RM001); re-issued on CD in 2006 via Guerssen Records (Catalonia, Spain) (GUPENCD008, GUESSCD009, DL-46911-2006)
- 1984: The Proud & Careless Notes ...RM002 LP
- 1985: Wilderness Restless Music (RRPOO5)
- 1986: Birchgrove Quay RM012
- 1990: All Over Queensland
- 1990: Fair Wind Home RM024
- 1992: Backbone of the Nation – The Women of Australia RM035
- 1992: Down the Track
- 1998 Outback Café RM067 CD
- 1999: Opal Miner – The Songs of Bill Scott (author) RM075
- 2001: Heart of Town RM080
- 2006: Big Water RM100
- 2009: Moon Caller RM138
- 2012: Boomerang Bay RM156
- 2013: Bush Baroque – 30 Year Retrospective RM037
- 2015: ...and both shall row ... RM173
