= For Common Cause =

London non-profit organization

- Founded: April 2013
- Founder: Karen Snow
- Purpose: Economic development
- Location: London, United Kingdom
- Employees: 6
- Website: forcommoncause.org

For Common Cause is a London-based charity that claims to combat inequality by crowdfunding skills, money, and equipment for people in need to build their own livelihoods. Volunteers and donors work with beneficiaries first-hand to see any personal impact.

For Common Cause identifies people on benefits who have completed training and prepared business plans through one of their partners. Potential entrepreneurs must have completed training and prepared business plans with one of For Common Cause's partners. People can browse projects or micro-enterprises to contact them directly to offer support. Supporters can help in a variety of ways: volunteering time or skills via email, phone, or at an event, or donating cash or equipment.

== History ==
For Common Cause was founded by Karen Snow after she worked with DFID and USAID on poverty reduction, civic participation, and public-private partnerships. Snow founded the charity after working with victims of trauma and torture in apartheid South Africa to launch their own livelihoods. "I saw there was nothing for those at the grassroots to do things for themselves. We have big institutions and governments, but they only offer a partial solution," said Snow in an interview with Calahane in 2013.

== Structure and management ==
The charity is managed by its governing document, a deed of trust, and constitutes a limited company, limited by guarantee by the Companies Act 2006.

For Common Cause as of 2015 has 260 volunteers who support the beneficiaries to get their business off the ground, and 150 registered beneficiaries.

Funds come from individuals, a 5% fee on all donations made through the site, Gift Aid from donations, corporate sponsorship and trust and foundation grants. Unrestricted funding goes towards the running costs of the organization; individual donations made towards projects go directly to beneficiaries. Included in the 5% fee are fees associated with credit card processing, foreign currency exchange, transaction costs, and Gift Aid processing costs.

For Common Cause had an income of £91,062 and spent £58,172 in 2013.

== Publicity ==
For Common Cause participated in the first annual Grass Roots Enterprise conference in 2013.

For Common Cause featured in MEP Syed Kamall's series OURCITY London in February 2015.

Karen Snow wrote an article about the responsibility of alleviating poverty that was featured on the University of Westminster Career Development Centre, NCVO, and Positive News.

RBS SE100 Index, an annual data snapshot to measure growth and examine performance of social enterprises, gave For Common Cause an Impact Measurement Score of 7 out of 10.

== See also ==
- Social entrepreneurship
