= Percy Ilott =

Australian rules footballer

Personal information
- Full name: Percy Nestor Joseph Ilott
- Born: 6 March 1916; Richmond, Victoria
- Died: 29 June 2001 (aged 85)
- Original team: Mt Carmel Old Boys
- Height: 184 cm (6 ft 0 in)
- Weight: 81 kg (179 lb)

Playing career^{1}
Years	Club	Games (Goals)
1937	South Melbourne	7 (3)
- ^{1} Playing statistics correct to the end of 1937.

Percy Nestor Joseph Ilott (6 March 1916 – 29 June 2001) was an Australian rules footballer who played with South Melbourne in the Victorian Football League (VFL).
