= Florence Tsagué Assopgoum =

Cameroonian political scientist (born 1977)

Florence Tsague Assopgoum
- Born: 1977 (age 48–49); Bafou, Cameroon
- Education: University of Siegen
- Scientific career
- Fields: Political Science

Florence Tsague (born 1977 in Bafou-Djuttitsa, west of Cameroon in West Africa), is a Cameroonian political scientist and writer.

== Career ==
Tsagué A. is a member of several organizations such as the African Union in Siegerland (region of Germany) and African Development Initiative. She is an accredited lecturer at Europäische Akademie NRW. In addition to her publications in the press such as Africa Positive, she organizes reading sessions in the Siegen area. In 2008 she took part in Siegen Wittgenstein's poets and writers tour entitled "Menschen zwischen den Kulturen".

She writes news, poems and novels. Her first novel, Famous Women, Unknown Co-Wives, was published in August 2009. In this novel, which takes the reader into a rich world of cultures and traditions, she talks about the discrimination of women and girls in the inheritance system in Cameroon. It also contains themes on polygamy, child abuse and complicit silence. The book pleads for the adaptation of the culture that addresses the urgent problems of its time and thus participates in a debate which in African societies are dominated by the elders. This novel was nominated for the Pan-literate prize of the association "Africa Culture Rhein-Neckar".

=== Political activities for integration ===
In February 2008, Tsagué was elected as a member of the Integration Council of the city of Siegen Integrationsrat, a representative council voted by foreigners in German cities where more than 5,000 foreigners live, which advocates for their causes, takes a position on city problems and brings the grievances of foreigners to the city leaders. She represents this council in the city committee for social, family and elderly affairs.

=== Selected publications ===
- Famous Women, Unknown Co-Wives, Édilivre, 2009, 334 p. (novel)
- Funeral rites in the process of individualization in Germany: what lessons for the African diaspora?, in Camer.be, Published on 28 February 2011.
- Financing education: African states prefer weapons to school supplies, in Africa & Science, published on 23 August 2011.
- Africa responds "present" to the virtual meeting: but what impact on the exchange of information?, in Africa & Science published on 6 September 2011.
