= Florence Parpart =

American inventor

Florence Wilhelmina Parpart Layman (January 1873 - December 3, 1930). Her patents before her marriage were filed under her maiden name of Florence Parpart; patents after her marriage were filed under her married name of Florence Layman. She was an American inventor known primarily for her patents for an industrial sweeping machine and electrical refrigerator.

== Personal life ==
Biographies frequently claim that little is known of Parpart's life, describing her simply as being described on census data as a housewife or as the inventor of the refrigerator. While it is true that we do not have any direct sources written by Parpart, it is possible to gather key details from newspapers, patent filings, and census data published throughout her life.

Although Parpart's birthplace is often given as Hoboken, New Jersey, census records show that she was born in New York City in 1873. In 1880, she lived in Brooklyn with her parents Edward Parpart, a sugar refinery worker, and Wilhelmina Parpart, whose occupation was given as "keephouse," both of whom were German immigrants to the United States, and several older siblings. By 1900, census data recorded Parpart as living with her widowed mother in Hoboken.

Parpart's family may have been wealthy. Upon her father's death in 1900, she was supposedly left "a legacy of $10,000".

Parpart was trained as a stenographer and worked at a New Jersey company, the Eastern Sanitary Street Cleaning Company, in the early 1900s. A newspaper clipping that describes her marriage notes that Parpart "rapidly advanced" and became known as a "successful young business woman" for her "earnestness and ability". By 1902, she was the Company Secretary. Macdonald describes Parpart as being a "newspaperwoman", although it is not clear which paper she wrote for if this is true.

While at Eastern Sanitary, Parpart also met her future husband Hiram D. Layman, who was the company's general manager. The couple was married at her mother's home in New York on July 5, 1903. Parpart's patents track this relationship. Although on her 1899 patent she is listed as "Florence W. Parpart" her 1904 patent describes her as "Florence W. Parpart (by marriage now Florence W. Layman)". Parpart is credited as Florence P. Layman on the other patent which lists her as inventor, a 1914 patent for an electrical refrigerator, as well as two other patents filed by her husband for which she was listed as assignee.

Patent filings show that the Laymans moved several times between 1900 and 1919. Their residence is listed as New York City on the street sweeper patents, as Hoboken, New Jersey by the time she and Layman filed their refrigerator patent in July 1913, and as Pittsburgh, Philadelphia by the time her husband filed several additional patents between 1913 and 1919.

Parpart appears to have continued living in Pittsburgh until Hiram D. Layman's death in June 1919, although by the time of her death in 1930 she appears to have returned to New York, as her death was reported in a Brooklyn newspaper.

== Patents ==
=== Street sweeper ===
The first invention credited to Parpart is a street sweeper designed to automate the process of cleaning city streets. Parpart filed two patents for this invention (No. 649,609 in 1899 and no. 762,241 in 1901), both of which listed Hiram D. Layman as co-inventor despite his being only an investor.

The sweeper was designed to reduce the manual labor involved in street sweeping by providing an automated mechanism to "efficiently gather dirt from the street-surface regardless of inequalities" and deliver the dirt by an onboard elevator to a storage receptacle that could then discharge it into carts. Also important in the design was that the sweeper would be covered, reducing dirt and dust in the air during its operation.

According to advertisements from the time period, the sweeper was broadly successful.

An early advertisement from 1900 presented the new invention in the form of a petition to the street commissioner of Greater New York, claiming that 5,000 people had signed. The advertisement presented similar language to the patent, arguing that use of the sweeper would "materially [reduce] sickness, suffering and the consequent death rate" because it could "keep the streets clean" without "hard labor" and that it would do so without "circulating [dirt, dust and refuse] in the open air".

In a 1905 advertisement, the American Sanitary Corporation describes itself as having the exclusive rights to purchase and use the 1904 version of the street sweeper and that they were being leased to municipalities around the nation, with photos of their operation in Hartford, Connecticut and Chicago, Illinois.

=== Electrical refrigerator ===
Parpart’s contribution to advancing electrical refrigeration is often forgotten. The invention of the electric refrigerator is often credited to Frederick W. Wolf Jr., who created the DOMELRE (Domestic Electric Refrigerator). Wolf’s DOMELRE was a unit that could be attached to any icebox to replace the ice itself. The device was not very affordable for most families, nor was it reliable, often blowing fuses.

Parpart’s design was different and made the icebox completely obsolete. Parpart was granted a patent for her Refrigerator Attachment in 1914. Because this patent was filed after her marriage, Parpart’s name is listed as Florence P. Layman. Her husband, Hiram D. Layman is also listed as a co-inventor. Parpart’s Refrigerator Attachment used electricity to circulate water throughout the refrigerator to keep it cold.

Unfortunately, Parpart may have been too ahead of her time. In 1908, only 10% of American households had access to electricity and it would take until 1949 for that access to reach 90% of American households. The Great Depression caused many Americans to change the way they thought about food waste. Because of this changed mindset, and New Deal loans encouraging electrification, the adoption of electric refrigerators could finally take off in the 1930s.

Parpart attended trade shows, created her own advertising campaigns, and managed the production of her refrigerators. However, by the time the market was ready for an invention like Parpart’s en masse, powerful players in appliance manufacturing had already had the time to perfect the concept and introduce their own models like General Electric’s Monitor, introduced in 1927.

The electric refrigerator was not only essential in difficult times, when people couldn’t afford to throw away leftovers and needed their food to last longer, but it laid the foundation for a period of economic prosperity that brought a huge shift towards consumerism. The ability to preserve seasonal produce and foods far beyond harvest allowed stores to offer a wide variety of foods, leading to the creation of supermarkets. Leftovers and pre-made meals became a way to save time and money, which companies like Tupperware capitalized on, becoming a huge cultural and social phenomenon.

It can be debated either way whether Parpart or Wolf were first in creating electrical refrigeration. Wolf filed his patent application on April 7, 1913, while Parpart filed her application a few months later on July 22, 1913. However, Parpart’s application was granted on March 24, 1914 before Wolf’s was granted on January 26, 1915. The two methods were distinct from each other, and while Wolf may be more widely remembered as the inventor of the first electrical refrigerator, the technology patented by Parpart is the true predecessor to the refrigerators we now use today.

=== Status as inventor ===
Despite Layman's name appearing first on the three patents which credit Parpart as co-inventor, publications at the time and more recent research suggest that the inventions were entirely Parpart's work.

It was a common practice during the late 19th and early 20th century for women inventors "to add a man as co-inventor as a form of partial assignment by patent in order to facilitate investment and commercialization and minimize anti-woman bias and stigma". Parpart was listed as assignee of several of Layman's later inventions, rather than co-inventor, making it clear that her being credited as inventor in the 1901, 1904, and 1914 patents was not a mistake.

The interpretation that the street sweeper was Parpart's invention is supported by a 1902 article about the improvement of the new machine notes that the invention was "largely the product" of Parpart's mind, citing her "unpleasant experience in getting about the streets of New York" during the political control of Tammany Hall as the impetus for the invention.

== Other inventions ==
Prior to her street sweeper, Parpart is credited with having invented a pneumatic corset and collapsible boat, although neither of these were patented.

A magazine from 1914 credits her as creating a board for polishing silverware designed so that "six articles can be cleaned at one handling, and they cannot be bent out of shape". Again, no patent was filed for this invention.
