= New Florence =

New Florence is the name of several towns in the United States:

- New Florence, Missouri
- New Florence, Pennsylvania
