= Sainte-Florence =

Sainte-Florence may refer to:

- Sainte-Florence, Gironde, France
- Sainte-Florence, Quebec, Canada
- Sainte-Florence, Vendée, France
