= Innocenzo =

Innocenzo is a male given name of Latin origin. Notable people with this name include:

- Innocenzo da Berzo (1844–1890), Roman Catholic priest
- Innocenzo Bonelli (fl. 1877), Captain Regent of San Marino
- Innocenzo Del Bufalo-Cancellieri (1566–1610), Roman Catholic cardinal
- Innocenzo Chatrian (1927–2019), Italian cross-country skier
- Innocenzo Ciocchi Del Monte (c. 1532–1577), Roman Catholic cardinal
- Giovanni Battista Innocenzo Colombo (1717–1801), Swiss painter and architect
- Innocenzo Conti (1731–1785), Roman Catholic cardinal
- Innocenzo Cybo (1491–1550), Roman Catholic cardinal
- Innocenzo Donina (1950–2020), Italian footballer
- Innocenzo Ferrieri (1810–1887), Roman Catholic cardinal
- Innocenzo Fraccaroli (1805–1882), Italian sculptor
- Innocenzo di Pietro Francucci da Imola (c. 1490–1550), Italian painter
- Carlo Innocenzo Frugoni (1692–1768), Italian poet
- Innocenzo Leonelli (1592–1625), Italian soldier
- Innocenzo Manzetti (1826–1877), Italian inventor
- Giovanni Innocenzo Martinelli (1942–2019), Roman Catholic prelate
- Innocenzo Migliavacca (1635–1714), Roman Catholic prelate
- Flaminio Innocenzo Minozzi (1735–1817), Italian painter
- Innocenzo Spinazzi (1726–1798), Italian sculptor

== See also ==
- Damiano and Fabio D'Innocenzo, a pair of Italian film directors
- Innocenzo Gasparini Institute for Economic Research, a research center of Bocconi University
