= Florence Gaub =

Franco-German political scientist (born 1977)

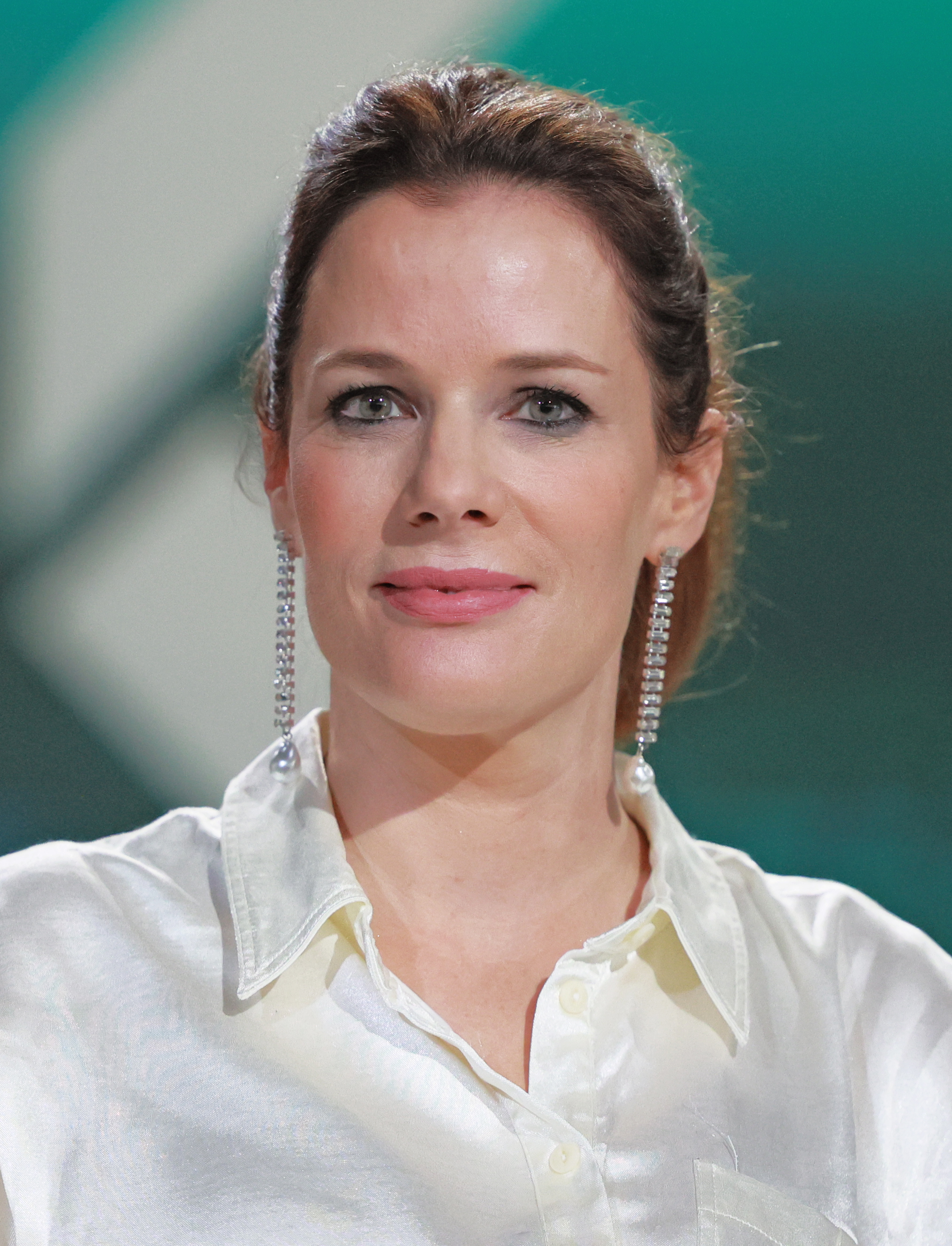
- Gaub in 2023
- Born: 1977 (age 48–49)
- Education: LMU Munich, Paris Sorbonne University, SciencesPo Paris, Humboldt University of Berlin
- Occupations: Researcher, Security expert and Futurist
- Website: florencegaub.online

Florence Gaub (born 1977) is a Franco-German researcher, security expert and futurist who focuses on foresight based policy formation for international relations and security policy. She is director of the research division at the NATO Defense College (Rome). She worked as deputy director at the European Union Institute for Security Studies (EUISS) in Paris from February 2018 until May 2022, worked as foresight advisor at the General Secretariat of the Council and was Visiting Professor at the College of Europe, member of the World Economic Forum Global Future Councils on Complex Risks (2021 - 2025).

== Early life and education ==
Gaub studied political science at LMU Munich (MA, 1997-2002) and part of these studies at SciencesPo Paris (2000 - 2001). She also obtained a Master's degree from Sorbonne University (2003–2004). Apart from her native languages German and French she says she speaks English, Arabic and Italian.

She obtained a PhD in International Politics from Humboldt University, Berlin, in 2009 with a dissertation on "Multiethnic armies and civil war: the cases of Nigeria, Lebanon and Bosnia-Herzegovina", for which she spent considerable time in the field and which was later also published as a book for Routledge in 2010.

== Career ==
From 2009 till 2013 she worked at the NATO Defense College in Rome, coordinating Middle East research and conducting training courses for military officers from Arab countries. In 2013 Gaub joined the EUISS as head of the Middle East and North Africa programme where she was promoted to Deputy Director in 2018 and built up foresight capacities and capabilities until leaving the Institute in May 2022.

Gaub specializes in strategic foresight and matters of international security, advising high level decision makers in governments and IOs such as NATO, OSCE, UN or of course, at EU level. From 2012 till 2015 she was also a reserve officer in the French army with the rank of major. She also taught at the University of Potsdam and at Sciences Po in Paris. Raised in Munich, Gaub interned in the cabinets of German politicians from Bavaria, Ludwig Wörner in 2002 and Axel Berg in 2007-2008. Gaub was vice-president at the European Forum Alpbach (From 2021 - 2024). She is presently a member of the Global Future Council on Geopolitics.

Gaub has commented on the 2022 Russian invasion of Ukraine in the media and, in particular, on German late night political talk shows. She also published in media such as Die Zeit, Süddeutsche Zeitung and Die Welt.

In an appearance on the talk show Markus Lanz on 12 April 2022, Gaub drew attention for commenting that, in her view, Russian society does not share the “liberal, post-modern approach to life” found in parts of Western Europe and that make opposition to war casualties pronounced. She later elaborated on this in an interview with Die Zeit. Her statements have been criticized as "racist" and reflecting a "centuries old colonialist trope used to justify genocide".

In 2023, Gaub was ranked in Politico's Power 40 Brussels Class of 2023 list. In 2024, Gaub was awarded the Bavarian Constitutional Order for her work. In same 2024, she published the graphic novel NATO 2099.

== Selected works ==
=== Books ===
- Military Integration after Civil Wars. Multiethnic Armies, Identity and Post-Conflict Reconstruction. Routledge, 2010
- Guardians of the Arab State: why militaries intervene in politics. Hurst: London, 2017
- The Cauldron: NATO’s Libya Operation. Hurst: London, 2018
- The images of war in French literature. Duisburg: WiKu-Verlag Verlag für Wissenschaft und Kultur, 2008 (in German)
- Zukunft. Eine Bedienungsanleitung. dtv: München, 2023 (in German)
- Futuro: un manual de instrucciones (2024)
- Future: A manual (Hurst, 2026)
- Szenario: Die Zukunft steht auf dem Spiel (dtv), 2025
- NATO 2099 (Graphic novel), 2025
- What if... 12 Dragon King scenarios for 2028, NATO Defense College, 2025

=== Articles ===
- How to Get Better at Making Warnings, World Economic Forum, 2021
- Global Trends to 2030, European Commission, 2019
- Why Does Foresight Matter in a Time of Crisis?, Institut Montaigne, 2020
- Europe’s Bad Nuclear Options - And Why They May Be the Only Path to Security, foreignaffairs.com, June 24, 2025
