= Cerinah Nebanda =

Ugandan politician (1988-2012

- Born: Uganda
- Died: 2012 (aged 23–24); Kampala, Uganda
- Citizenship: Uganda
- Occupation: Politician
- Years active: 2011–2012
- Title: Member of Parliament; Parliament of Uganda

Cerinah Nebanda (1988–2012) was a member of the parliament of Uganda, representing the Butaleja District Women's Constituency.

Her death at the age of 24, in December 2012, sparked political controversy.

== Death and subsequent investigation ==
A government chemist's post-mortem report stated that cocaine, heroin, alcohol, and several other chemicals were found in Nebanda's blood, intestinal tract, and tissue samples.

At Nebanda's funeral, however, Speaker Rebecca Kadaga rejected this report. Ugandan President Yoweri Museveni denied that the National Resistance Movement, the political party to which he and the late Nebanda belonged to, had killed her. The Observer newspaper reported that some Ugandan members of parliament (MPs) believe that Nebanda was poisoned, as she was a vocal critic of the government, and that the state was "arresting anyone suspected to be propagating that line". Among those arrested were two MPs, one of whom was Mohamed Nsereko.

Earlier, The Daily Monitor newspaper had reported that a pathologist who Nebanda's family had asked to examine her samples had been arrested while on his way to conduct tests in South Africa.

On 2 January 2013, police announced that they had opened an investigation into Nebanda's death and linked it to what they called "a narcotic drug syndicate operating in a number of countries including Uganda, Pakistan, and South Sudan". On 4 January, Nebanda's boyfriend, Adam Suleiman Kalungi, was arrested in Kenya and extradited to Uganda for questioning by police. In July 2014, he was acquitted of the criminal charges surrounding her death.
