= Florence Hinckel =

French writer

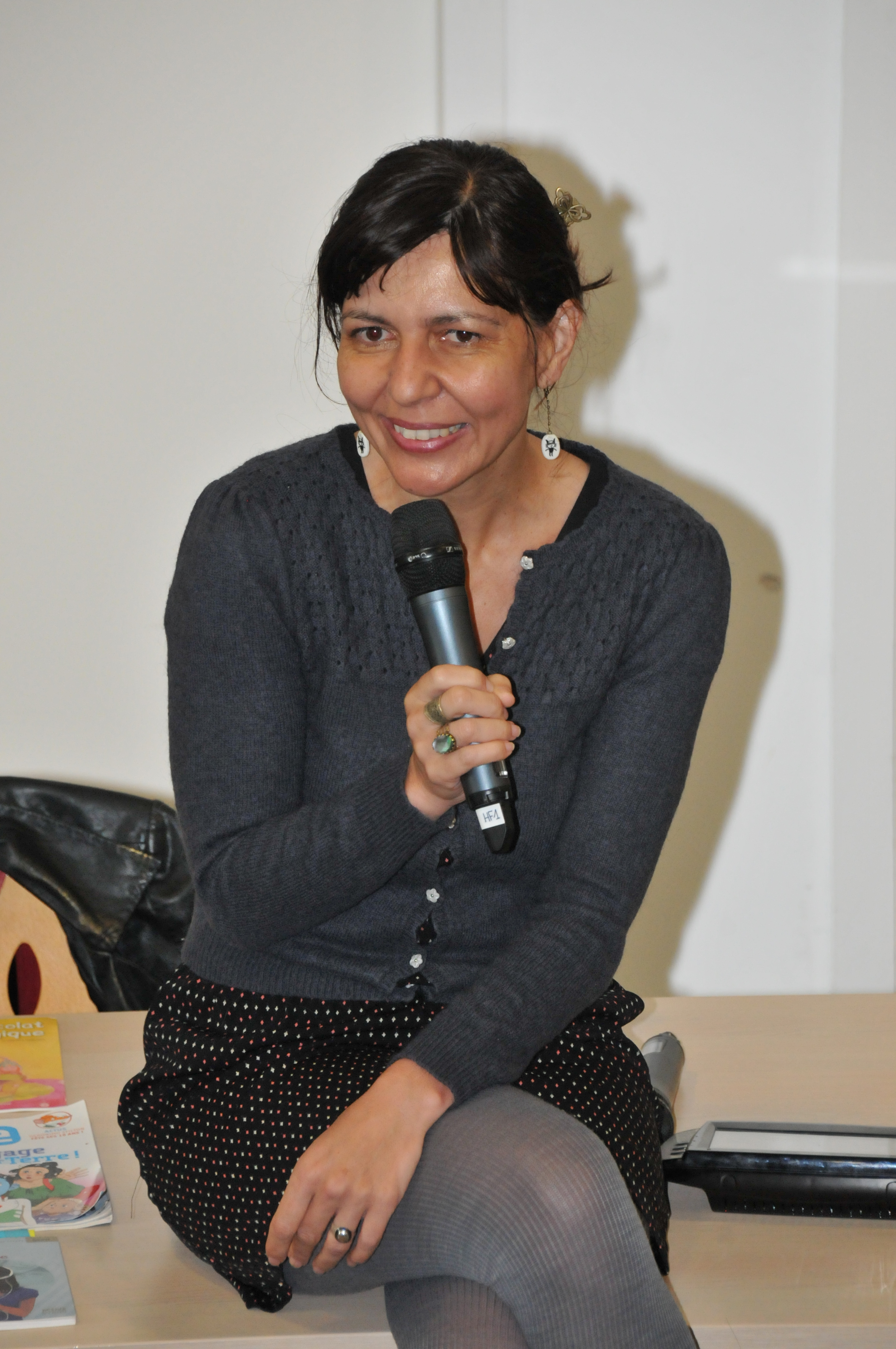
Florence Hinckel

Florence Hinckel (13 December 1973) is a French writer. Her novels are published by Gallimard Jeunesse, Nathan, Syros, Rageot, Éditions Sarbacane and also by Éditions Talents Hauts.

== Works ==
- U4 (book series). Yannis, Nathan - Syros, 2015
- Populaire ?, Rageot, 2015
- Le chastronaute, Nathan, 2015
- #Bleue, Syros, series Soon, 2015
- Super-Louis et l'île aux quarante crânes, Sarbacane, series Pepix, 2014
- Hors de moi, Talents Hauts, series Ego, 2014
- Chat va faire mal, Nathan, 2014
- Quatre filles et Quatre garçons, Talents Hauts, 2014
- Le chat beauté, Nathan, 2013.
- Secrets.com, Rageot, 2013
- Théa pour l'éternité, Syros, 2012.
- L'été où je suis né, Gallimard Jeunesse, series Scripto, 2011.
- Le Chat Pitre, Nathan, 2011.
- Grave in love, tome 8 de La ligne 15, Talents hauts, 2011.
- Révoltée, tome 7 de La ligne 15, Talents hauts, 2011.
- Zéro commentaire, tome 6 de La ligne 15, Talents hauts, 2011.
- Une fille sans faille, tome 5 de La ligne 15, Talents hauts, 2011.
- T'es pas cap, tome 4 de La ligne 15, Talents hauts, 2010.
- Plus belle tu meurs, tome 3 de La ligne 15, Talents hauts, 2010.
- Toutes les filles de la Terre, tome 2 de La ligne 15, Talents hauts, 2010.
- Ma métamorphose, tome 1 de La ligne 15, Talents hauts, 2010.
- A toi, Oskar, 2010.
- Vanilles et Chocolats, Oskar, 2010.
- Le Maillot de bain, Talents hauts, 2009.
- Les Copains, le soleil et Nabila, Gallimard Jeunesse, series Folio Junior, 2009.
- Le chocolat magique, Averbode, series Tirelire, 2008
- Ma mère est maire, Talents hauts, 2008.
- La Fille qui dort, Les 400 coups, 2007.
- Confidences entre filles, Rageot, 2007.
- Le Lézard de l'Alcazar, Le lutin Malin, 2007.
- Amoïlena, Le Griffon Bleu, 2006.
- La Guerre des vanilles, Magnard, 2006. Trophée 2008 Livre mon ami
- Clopes en stock, Rouge Safran, 2005.
- Le Panier aux mystères, Rouge Safran, 2003.

== Publications in papers ==
- L'été où je suis né, Je Bouquine, Bayard Presse, 2010.
- Mon voyage sur Terre, Dlire, Bayard Presse, 2012
