= Pascal Grothe =

German politician (born 1992)

- Grothe in 2025

Member of the Berlin House of Representatives
- Incumbent
- Assumed office 29 October 2026

Personal details
- Born: 10 November 1992 (age 33)
- Party: Alliance 90/The Greens

Pascal Grothe (born 10 November 1992) is a German politician who was elected member of the Berlin House of Representatives in 2026. He has served as group leader of Alliance 90/The Greens in the borough council of Marzahn-Hellersdorf since 2023.
