= Florence, Tennessee =

Unincorporated community in Tennessee, US

Coordinates: 35°55′07″N 86°28′06″W

Florence is an unincorporated community in Rutherford County, in the U.S. state of Tennessee.

== History ==
A variant name was "Florence Station". A post office called Florence Station was established in 1867, the name was changed to Florence in 1894, and the post office closed in 1937. The community once contained a schoolhouse.
