= Florence Small =

English painter and pastel artist

Florence Veric Hardy Small
- Born: ca. 1860; Nottingham, England
- Died: 1933; South Hampstead, London
- Other names: Florence Deric Hardy; Florence Veru Hardy Small; Florenee Veric Hardy Small
- Known for: Painting

Florence Veric Hardy Small (circa 1860 – 1933, known also as Florence Deric Hardy, Florence Veru Hardy Small, or Florenee Veric Hardy Small) was an English painter. She was born in Nottingham and died at South Hampstead in north London.

== Career ==
Small studied art in Geneva, Berlin, and Paris. In Paris she trained under William-Adolphe Bouguereau, Deschamps, and Robert Henri. She settled in London sometime during or before the 1880s, and produced many portraits using oil paint and pastels, mostly of high society women and children. Her portrait style is described as "gentle, unmistakably feminine" and "typical of the 'innocent-child' genre subjects made popular during the latter half of nineteenth century." Small also painted genre scenes, flowers, and fruit.

For the Golden Jubilee of Queen Victoria in 1887 Florence Small painted a portrait of the queen from which chromolithograph copies were made and sold; it was well received. Her pastel painting White Lilies was well received in a 1893 exhibition at Nottingham Castle.

=== Exhibitions ===
Small exhibited at the Salon des Artistes Français, and in 1909 she won a jury commendation. She also exhibited at the Royal Academy of Arts in London from 1881. She exhibited widely in other London galleries, including Grafton Gallery (in 1904) and Grosvenor Gallery (1889), and multiple times with the Allied Artists Association in the Royal Albert Hall. She also exhibited in Nottingham and other industrial cities such as Birmingham and Manchester.

Small became a member of the Pastel Society (see the modern continuation) in 1898, exhibiting with them in 1900 and 1910. Her work at the 1900 exhibition was described as "tasteful ... studies in pleasant colour and human expression".
