= Florence Beatty-Brown =

American educator

- Florence Beatty-Brown, from 1951 newspaper
- Born: Florence Rebekah Beatty; December 16, 1912; Cairo, Illinois, U.S.
- Died: September 7, 2002 (age 89); Columbia, Maryland, U.S.
- Other name: Florence Beatty Brown
- Occupation: Educator

Florence Rebekah Beatty-Brown (December 16, 1912 – September 7, 2002) was an American educator and sociologist who taught at Fayetteville State Teachers College, Meramec Community College, Lincoln University and Harris-Stowe State University. She worked with Carter G. Woodson on Negro History Bulletin and Negro History Week. She consulted on education projects in Liberia and Thailand.

== Early life and education ==
Beatty was born in Cairo, Illinois, the daughter of Webster Barton Beatty and Alice Titus Beatty. Her father was a dentist and her mother was a teacher; her brother Webster Barton Beatty Jr. was a YMCA executive, and national campaign director of the United Negro College Fund. She graduated from Fisk University in 1933, and earned two master's degrees at the University of Illinois, in 1936 and 1939. She completed doctoral studies in sociology in 1951, at the University of Illinois, with a dissertation titled "The Negro as Portrayed in the St. Louis Post-Dispatch from 1920 to 1950". She was a member of Delta Sigma Theta.

== Career ==
Beatty-Brown received two fellowships from the Rosenwald Fund, in 1934–1935, to study rural education in Louisiana, and in 1942–1943, to study Black families. She taught at Fayetteville State Teachers College from 1937 to 1945, at Lincoln University from 1945 to 1947, at Stowe Teachers College from 1949 to 1954, at Harris Teachers College from 1954 to 1963, and at Meramec Community College from 1963 to 1983. From 1961 to 1963 she served on a team of educators to develop curriculum for Zorzor Rural Teacher Training Institute in Liberia. She held a Fulbright grant to establish a sociology graduate program at Chiang Mai University in Thailand.

== Publications ==
Beatty-Brown was a founding member of the editorial board of the Negro History Bulletin, and wrote several articles for the publication.

- "Leonora Tecumseh Jackson" (1941)
- "John Chavis" (1942)
- "George Moses Horton" (1942)
- "Henry Plummer Cheatham" (1942)
- "Legal Status of Arkansas Negroes before Emancipation" (1969)

== Personal life ==
Beatty married fellow educator Robert Duane Brown. They had a son, Robert Jr. She died in 2002, at the age of 89, at a nursing home in Columbia, Maryland.
