= Florence Hems =

American politician (died 1982)

Member of the Connecticut House of Representatives from Middlefield
- In office 1962–1963
- Preceded by: Francis Hems
- Succeeded by: William J. Coughlin Jr.

Personal details
- Born: Florence E. Gavin Wallingford, Connecticut, U.S.
- Died: February 10, 1982 Middletown, Connecticut, U.S.
- Party: Democratic
- Spouse: Francis Hems

Florence E. Hems (died February 10, 1982) was an American politician who served in the Connecticut House of Representatives from 1962 to 1963, representing the town of Middlefield as a Democrat. She was elected in a February 1962 special election to succeed her late husband, Francis Hems, who died in November 1961 while serving his second term in office. Hems did not seek reelection to a full term in 1962 and was succeeded by William J. Coughlin Jr. in 1963.
