= Saint-Florent =

Saint-Florent is the name or part of the name of several communes in France:

- Saint-Florent, Haute-Corse, in the Haute-Corse département
- Saint-Florent-des-Bois, in the Vendée département
- Saint-Florent-le-Jeune, in the Loiret département
- Saint-Florent-le-Vieil, in the Maine-et-Loire département
- Saint-Florent-sur-Auzonnet, in the Gard département
- Saint-Florent-sur-Cher, in the Cher département

There is also a cocktail called the Saint-Florent.
