= Firenza =

Firenza may refer to:

== Automobiles ==
- Various compact cars offered by General Motors:
  - Oldsmobile Firenza, a 1982–1988 American compact car
  - Vauxhall Firenza, a 1970–1975 British compact coupé
  - Firenza, a 1970–1979 British compact car sold in Canada as a rebadged Vauxhall Viva

== Other uses ==
- Peavey Firenza, an electric guitar; see List of Peavey guitars

== See also ==
- Florence, Tuscany, Italy, a city (more properly, Firenze)
- Forenza, a town in Italy
- Suzuki Forenza, a 2004-2007 compact car
