= Florence Oloo =

Kenyan chemist and professor

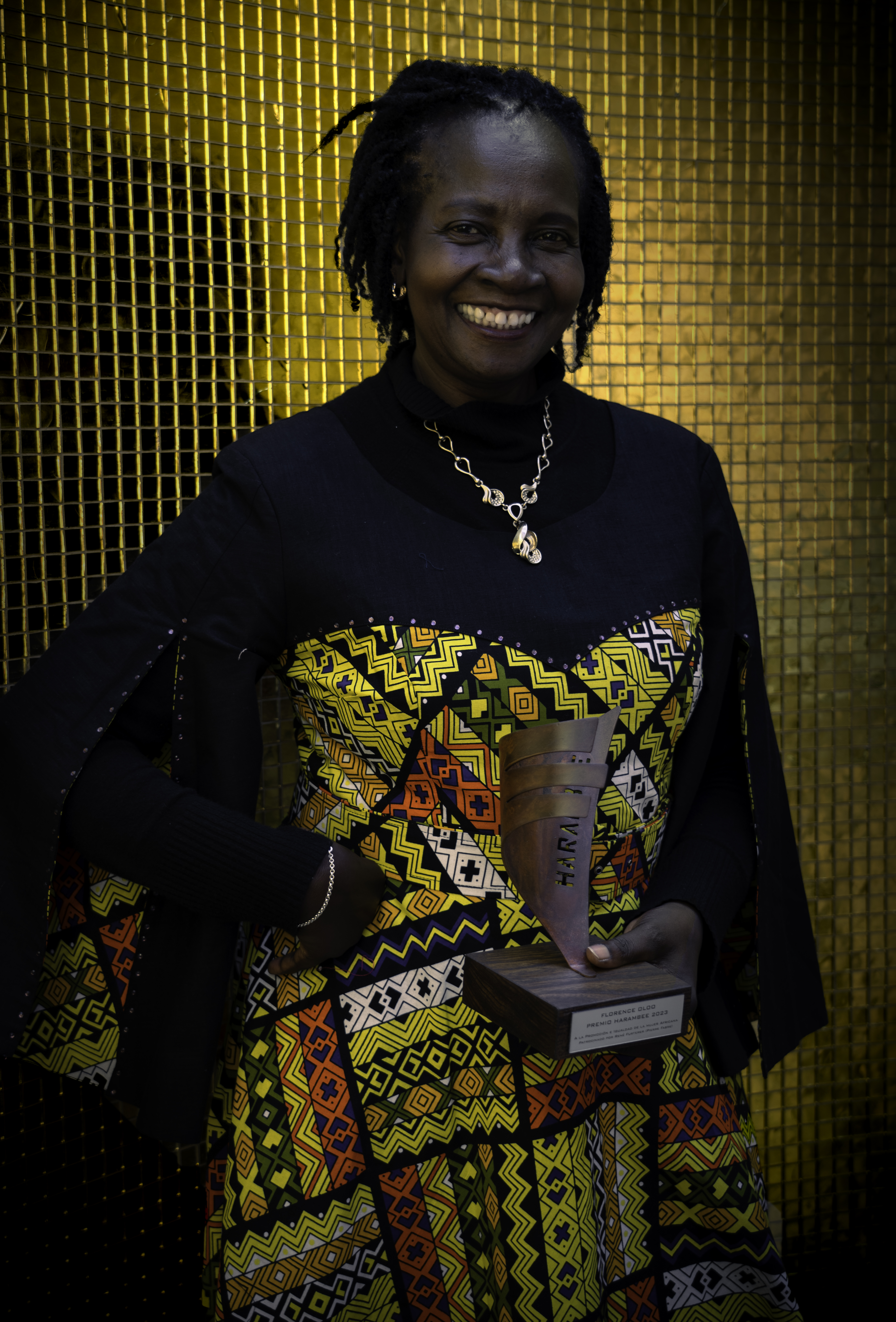
Florence Oloo in 2023.

Florence Oloo (born 1960) is a Kenyan scientist and professor of chemical sciences at the Technical University of Kenya, in Nairobi. She was the first Kenyan woman to receive a PhD in Chemistry.

== Biography ==
Florence Oloo was born in Eldoret in 1960; since childhood, she has been passionate about science.

She earned her Bachelor of Science degree from the University of Nairobi, and while there she was the only female student in the chemistry program. She went on to earn a degree in Philosophy and Education from the University of Rome, and a PhD in Chemistry from the Jomo Kenyatta University of Agriculture and Technology in Juja, Kenya, becoming the first woman from her country to earn a doctorate in chemistry.

== Activist ==
Oloo has directed the Community and Engagement program, which seeks to encourage girls' participation in STEM disciplines.

As the deputy vice-chancellor of Strathmore University in Nairobi, she headed the university's ethics committee, which is responsible for supervising about 300 scientific investigations each year with human subjects to stop irregularities that might harm anyone participating in the scientific studies and make sure investigators did not falsify their resulting scientific data.

She leads the nanomedicine platform at the Centre for Research in Therapeutic Sciences (CREATES) in partnership with the Scientific and Industrial Research Council of South Africa.

Oloo has also worked at the Jakana Study Centre in Kanyawegi, near the city of Kisumu, Kenya, where she leads the "Woman Empowerment Program", which aims to empower girls and women between 18 and 30 years old from diverse and vulnerable backgrounds in Kisumu County. This is an area next to Uganda where "more than half a million women live, many of whom live in poverty." The short six-month training program aims to help rural women create a business and use those skills to improve their family life and educational opportunities for the women and their children. Through the program, they learn "entrepreneurial techniques to provide them with skills that will enable them to start and maintain an economic activity that will provide them with income. Along with these, pastry and bakery courses are conducted to ensure that they have a skill set that they can monetize."

In 2009, she participated in the Synod for Africa convened by Pope Benedict XVI.

She won the 2023 Harambee Award for her work on the Promotion and Equality of African Women. The award ceremony took place on 22 March 2023 at the Urban Hotel in Madrid, Spain. Oloo's win of the award was followed in the following year by another activist from Kenya. Susan Kinyua won the award in 2024.
