= Florence Township =

Florence Township may refer to:

== Illinois ==
- Florence Township, Will County, Illinois
- Florence Township, Stephenson County, Illinois

== Iowa ==
- Florence Township, Benton County, Iowa

== Michigan ==
- Florence Township, Michigan

== Minnesota ==
- Florence Township, Goodhue County, Minnesota

== New Jersey ==
- Florence Township, New Jersey

== Ohio ==
- Florence Township, Erie County, Ohio
- Florence Township, Williams County, Ohio

== South Dakota ==
- Florence Township, Hamlin County, South Dakota, in Hamlin County, South Dakota
- Florence Township, Hand County, South Dakota, in Hand County, South Dakota
