= Florence (surname) =

Florence is a surname. Notable people with the surname include:

- Drayton Florence (born 1980), American football player
- Franklin Florence (1934-2023), American civil rights activist
- Gillian Florence, Canadian rugby union player
- Hércules Florence (1804–1879), French/Brazilian artist and one of several independent inventors of photography
- Tyler Florence (born 1971), celebrity chef and TV host
