= Florentius Volusenus =

Scottish linguist and humanist

Florentius Volusenus (c. 1504 – 1546 or 1547) was a Scottish humanist most noted for his De Animi Tranquillitate. "Florentius Volusenus" is a latinization of uncertain derivation; his first name is variously suggested as Florence or Florens, and surname as Wolson, Wolsey, or Wilson. In his letters written in English he refers to himself as Volusene.

== Early life ==
He was born near Elgin, studied Philosophy at Aberdeen, and in the dialogue De Animi Tranquillitate says that the description of the abode of tranquillity was based on a dream that came to him after a conversation with a fellow-student on the banks of his native River Lossie. He was then a student of Philosophy of four years' standing.

== In Paris ==
Proceeding to Paris, he became tutor to Thomas Wynter, reputed son of Cardinal Wolsey. He paid repeated visits to England, where he was well received by the king, and, after Wolsey's fall, he acted as one of Thomas Cromwell's agents in Paris. He was in England as late as 1534, and appears to have been Rector of Speldhurst in Kent.

In Paris he knew George Buchanan, and found patrons in the cardinal Jean de Lorraine and Jean du Bellay. He was to have gone with du Bellay on his mission to Italy in 1535, but illness kept him in Paris. As soon as he recovered he set out on his journey, but at Avignon, by the advice of his friend Antonio Bonvisi (d. 1558), he sought the patronage of the bishop of the diocese, the learned and pious Paul Sadolet, who made him master in the school at Carpentras, with a salary of seventy crowns. Volusenus paid frequent visits to Lyon (where Conrad Gesner saw him, still a young man, in 1540), probably also to Italy, where he had many friends, perhaps even to Spain. A letter addressed to him by Sadolet from Rome in 1546 shows that he had then resolved to return to Scotland, and had asked advice on the attitude he should adopt in the religious dissensions of the time. He died on the journey, however, at Vienne in Dauphiné, in 1546, or early in the next year.

== Work ==
Volusenus's linguistic studies embraced Hebrew as well as Greek and Latin. His reputation, however, rests on the beautiful dialogue, De Animi Tranquillitate, first printed by S. Gryphius at Lyon in 1543. From internal evidence it appears to have been composed about that time, but the subject had exercised the writer for many years. The dialogue shows us Christian humanism at its best. Volusenus is a great admirer of Erasmus, but he criticises the purity of his Latin and also his philosophy.

His own philosophy is Christian and Biblical rather than classical or scholastic. He takes a fresh and independent view of Christian ethics, and he ultimately reaches a doctrine as to the witness of the Spirit and the assurance of grace which breaks with the traditional Christianity of his time and is based on ethical motives akin to those of the German Reformers. The verses which occur in the dialogue, and the poem which concludes it, give Volusenus a place among Scottish Latin poets, but it is as a Christian philosopher that he attains distinction.

The dialogue was reissued at Leiden in 1637 by the Scots writer David Echlin, whose poems, with a selection of three poems from the dialogue of Volusenus, appear, with others, in the famous Amsterdam collection Delitiae Poetarum Scotorum hujus and printed by Johannes Blaeu in 2 vols. in 1637. Later editions of the dialogue appeared at Edinburgh in 1707 and 1751 (the latter edited by G. Wishart). All the reissues contain a short life of the author by Thomas Wilson, advocate, son-in-law and biographer of Archbishop Patrick Adamson. Supplementary facts are found in the letters and state papers of the period, and in Sadolet's Letters.
