= Florence Myers =

American politician (1889–1973)

Member of the Washington House of Representatives from the District 9 district
- In office 1933–1937

Personal details
- Born: January 16, 1889 Iowa
- Died: September 18, 1973 (aged 84) Spokane, Washington
- Party: Democratic

Florence W. Myers (January 16, 1889 – September 18, 1973) was an American politician. She was a Democrat, representing Washington's 9th legislative district which parts of Whitman County, from 1933 to 1937.
