= Florentius (African saint) =

Bishop during the latter Roman Empire

Saint Florentius (Italian: Fiorenzo) was a North African bishop during the latter Roman Empire, venerated as a saint by the Catholic Church. He is known to history from hagiographies and the Notitia Provinciarum et Civitatum Africae Bishop Florients He was Bishop of Simminensis, 30 km east of Carthage in Roman North Africa. He suffered the persecution at the hand of the Arian, Vandal king Huneric for his role in the Council of Carthage of 484 where he supported the Catholic position rejecting Arianism. He was exiled to Corsica and forced to hard labor, but there continued his apostolic work until his death. Also according to tradition, he was initially buried in the town that bears his name, San Fiorenzo. In 760 the bishop of Treviso, Titian, through a vision, discovered his relics and transferred them to his city, placing them in the church of St. John the Baptist. Currently his remains are on display to the public worship in the Cathedral of Treviso.
