= Florence Frances Huberwald =

American singer

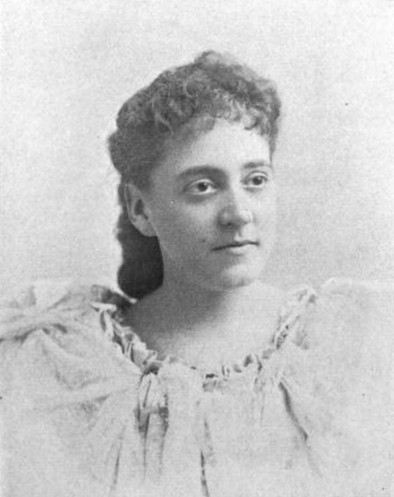
Florence Huberwald

Florence Frances Huberwald was an American singer, teacher, suffragist, and national leader of the women's movement. She was a charter member of the Woman Suffrage Party; and the co-founder and associate president of the New Orleans College of Music.

== Early life and education ==
Florence Frances Huberwald was born in New Orleans. Her maternal grandfather was from Connecticut and her grandmother was a Spanish native of St. Augustine, Florida. Her father's family were of German descent. Her family was connected with the history of New Orleans for many years. Her aunt, Caroline Hubbard, was the most notable and progressive principal of the New Orleans High School, of her time.

Huberwald was educated at the Sylvester-Larned Institute for Young Ladies. She studied vocal music in New York City; in Paris, under Anna La Grange, the vocalist; and in London.

== Career ==
"Florence Huberwald is a singer and vocal teacher. She does not like to read music papers published in New York, because it is her old home, and it makes her lonesome to see the names of her friends there. “Occasionally I buy the Musical Courier,” volunteered Miss Huberwald, “to see how well those persons are doing who advertise in your paper. I used to be an advertiser in the Musical Courier when I desired national publicity. At that time, my advertisement was secured by Fitzhugh W. Haensel, then in the advertising department of that paper, and now the senior partner of Haensel & Jones, the concert managers. Another reason I buy the Musical Courier is to see the programs given by the artists and to keep track of the new music. I have a most gifted pupil, Adele Corney, a very fine dramatic soprano. However, there are so few public chances here for a young local artist, that Miss Corney has to sing at the restaurant in the Hotel Grunewald." -The Music Magazine-musical Courier (1916)

Huberwald's first employment was that of teacher in a public school. She made a success of this, and in 1894, went to the legislature to push the measure for the back pay of teachers.

One of the social successes of her life was upon the occasion of her singing in a drawing room in Paris. The Louisiana State concert was said to be the grandest concert given at the Cotton States and International Exposition (1895). Huberwald had entire charge of the vocal part of the program that reflected so much credit upon Louisiana. Her speech at the 1895 General Federation of Women's Clubs convention was notable. She was the only singer who represented New Orleans at the Cotton States and International Exposition, and received a perfect ovation. Her contralto voice had a range of over two octaves, her enunciation was clear, and her method good. The volume of her voice was so great that it filled the largest hall or theatre. It was particularly fitted for star parts in grand opera, a heritage from her mother, a notable church singer of New Orleans. Besides being associate president of the New Orleans College of Music, founded by Mrs. Samuel and herself, she was vocal instructor at Sophie Wright's Institute. She believed in the Italian method of vocal culture, and was accounted the best ballad singer of New Orleans.

Huberwald served as president of the Teachers' Benevolent Association; Portia (suffrage) Club; and Equal Rights Party, Louisiana. She was a prominent member of the Woman's Club, did active work for the furtherance of women's progress, and was a charter member of the Woman Suffrage Party. An activist, she was the head of the local dress-reform movement in New Orleans.
