= Florence Ilott =

British runner (1913–2002)

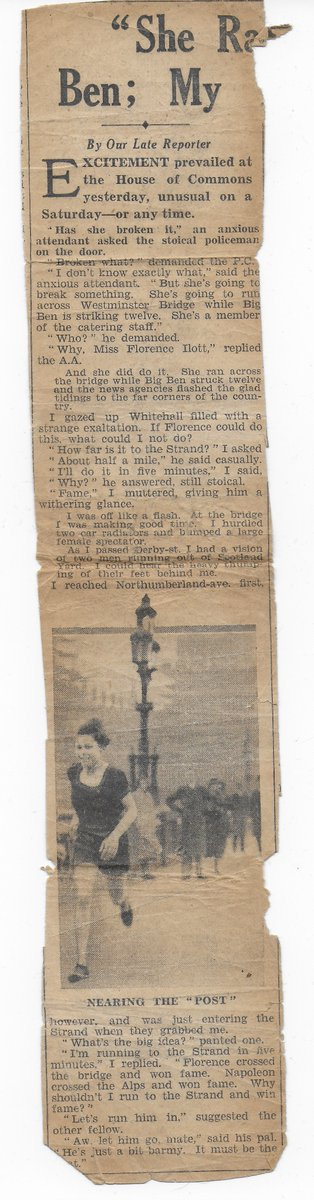
- Born: September 20, 1913
- Died: May 31, 2002 (aged 88)
- Known for: running across Westminster Bridge

Florence Ilott (20 September 1913 – 31 May 2002) was the first person to run across Westminster Bridge within the twelve chimes of Big Ben at noon.

Running across the bridge before the clock struck noon was a long-standing tradition with unknown origins for staff at the Commons. When Ilott accomplished this feat on 14 April 1934, she was a nineteen year old employed as a catering staff member in the tea room at the House of Commons. A news agency captured the achievement on film and sent it to cinema houses as part of a newsreel.

Ilott was an amateur sprinter with particular success in the 220-yard dash. She died on 31 May 2002.
