= Florence Timponi =

American singer

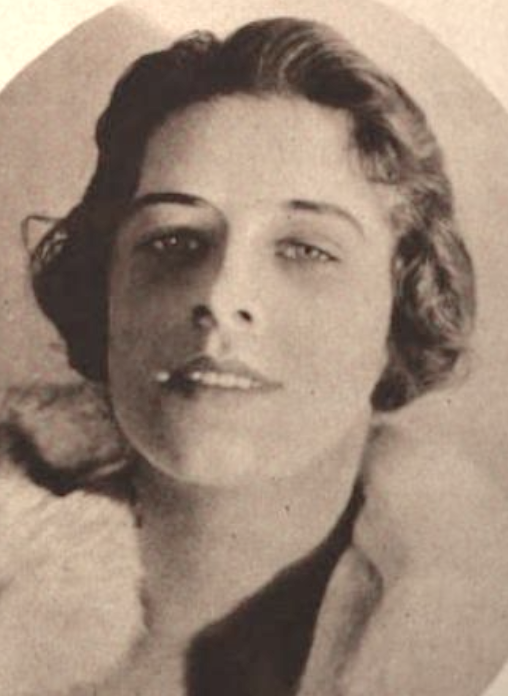
- Florence Timponi, from a 1920 publication
- Born: Florence Lucille Timpone; August 9, 1896; New York City, New York, U.S.
- Died: January 21, 1991 (aged 94); Santa Monica, California, U.S.
- Other names: Melva Talma, Florence Jennings
- Occupation(s): Singer, actress, vaudeville performer

Florence Timponi Jennings (August 9, 1896 – January 21, 1991), born Florence Lucille Timpone, also known as Melva Talma, was an American singer, actress, Ziegfeld girl, and vaudeville performer, billed as "the Sunshine Girl".

== Early life ==
Timpone was born in New York City, the daughter of Dominick Timpone and Mary Albro Timpone. Her father was born in Italy.

== Career ==
Timponi was a singer, especially in vaudeville shows. Variety magazine commented on her "fair personality and nice appearance" in 1914. She was billed as "the Sunshine Girl". During World War I, she sang at the 52nd Street Naval Armory in Brooklyn, and at Bensonhurst. She performed novelty songs about American troops fighting Germans. Her photo was featured on sheet music for some of her popular numbers, including Irving Berlin's "Oh! How I Hate to Get Up in the Morning" (1918) "You're a Great Big Blue-Eyed Baby" (1913), and "We'll knock the Heligo--Into Heligo--out of Heligoland!". She also collected clothing, canes, gloves, suitcases and leather, donated by her audiences, for reuse in the war effort. Her stage credits included roles in School Days and Little Simplicity.

In the 1920s, she performed as "Melva Talma", still singing novelty songs and still billed as "the Sunshine Girl." She sang in vaudeville programs in Canada in 1925.

== Personal life ==
Florence Timpone married George Washington Jennings in 1928. They had a daughter, Georgia Ann. George Jennings died in 1970, and Florence Jennings died in 1991, in Santa Monica, California, aged 94 years.
