= Florence Graves =

Florence George Graves
- Born: Florence George Graves
- Education: University of Arizona, University of Texas at Austin
- Known for: Investigative Journalist

Florence George Graves is an American journalist and the founding director of the Schuster Institute for Investigative Journalism at Brandeis University.

She is an investigative reporter and editor whose work focuses on exposing abuses of government and corporate power, and on revealing inequities between the powerful and the powerless. She also is a Resident Scholar at the Brandeis Women's Studies Research Center. As an investigative reporter for The Washington Post, she and a colleague broke the Senator Bob Packwood sexual misconduct story, which led to an historic three-year Senate investigation followed by a Senate Ethics Committee vote to expel him and then his forced resignation. She has received a number of major honors, including fellowships including from the Institute of Politics at Harvard Kennedy School at Harvard University, the Radcliffe Public Policy Institute, the Loyola Law School, the Alicia Patterson Journalism Fellowship in 1993, and the Pope Foundation.

Her work has been supported by many grant awards from the Fund for Investigative Journalism and Harvard’s Shorenstein Center on the Press, Politics and Public Policy. Her work has earned a number of national awards including the National Magazine Award for General Excellence and several Investigative Reporters and Editors awards.

In the 1980s, Graves founded the nationally circulated political and investigative journal, Common Cause Magazine. It became the largest circulation political magazine in the country (250,000), and the only one whose primary focus was investigative reporting. A 2003 article in Folio magazine said, “If Common Cause Magazine threw a reunion, it would look like a convention of today’s top investigative reporters. With a brand of muckraking that belonged more to the era of Ida Tarbell than of Rupert Murdoch, the magazine attracted and nurtured journalists who had a zeal for exposing the abuses of the powerful.”

Her work there led to congressional hearings and to reforms in public policies, and has received such awards as the Investigative Reporters and Editors Award and the 1987 National Magazine Award for General Excellence, the highest award given in magazine journalism.

The Schuster Institute for Investigative Journalism at Brandeis University is one of the earliest nonprofit news models and in 2004 became the first independent reporting center based at a university. Graves recruited determined, award-winning investigative reporters dedicated to exposing injustice. The Institute’s innovative “newsroom without walls” focused on collaborations with other news organizations, and starting in 2015 began a collaboration with the Fund for Investigative Journalism supported by the Ford Foundation to increase diverse voices and topics in investigative journalism.

Investigative journalism from the Schuster Institute led to significant changes in state, national and international laws, and corporate and government policies. The Institute’s Justice Brandeis Law Project’s work also helped lead to freedom for three wrongfully convicted Massachusetts men. Under Graves’ leadership, the Institute’s staff and fellows have won numerous awards, including the Sigma Chi Delta Award for Magazine Investigative Reporting, the National Magazine Award, the George Polk Award and the James Aronson Award for Social Justice Journalism.

In 2018, Graves was inducted into the University of Arizona School of Journalism’s Hall of Fame. “Without oversight, human beings too often behave badly. When the facts are pursued with ruthless thoroughness, watchdog journalism helps keep American institutions accountable to all,” she said.

In 2019, Graves was the 31st recipient of the Mary Louise Smith Chair in Women and Politics at Iowa State University. The same year, Brandeis University shut down the Schuster Institute for Investigative Journalism, citing a lack of funding.
