= Enzo Grothe =

Central African Republic footballer

Personal information
- Date of birth: 24 March 2005 (age 21)
- Place of birth: Cenon, France
- Height: 1.70 m (5 ft 7 in)
- Position: Winger

Team information
- Current team: Caen II
- Number: 80

Youth career
- Jeunesse Villenavaise
- 2019–2022: Bordeaux

Senior career*
Years	Team	Apps	(Gls)
2022–2024	Bordeaux II	24	(2)
2024	Bordeaux	2	(0)
2024–	Caen II	5	(0)

International career^{‡}
2025–	Central African Republic	1	(0)
- * Club domestic league appearances and goals as of 17:15, 27 August 2025 (UTC) ‡ National team caps and goals as of 17:15, 27 August 2025 (UTC)

Enzo Grothe (born 24 March 2005) is a Central African Republic professional footballer who plays as a winger for Caen II. Born in France, he plays for the Central African Republic national team.

== Club career ==
A youth product of Jeunesse Villenavaise, Grothe joined the youth academy of Bordeaux in 2019. He made his professional debut with the senior Caen team in a 4–2 Ligue 2 loss to Concarneau on 10 May 2024. He left Bordeaux on 23 September 2024 after the club was relegated due to financial administration. On 24 September 2024 he moved to Caen on a free transfer, joining their reserves.

== International career ==
Born in France, Grothe is of Central African, Senegalese and French descent. He was called up to the Central African Republic national team for a set of 2026 FIFA World Cup qualification matches in March 2025. He debuted with the Central African national team in a friendly 2–1 win over Mauritania on 6 June 2025.
