= Fiorenzo Maschera =

Italian composer and organist

Florentio Maschera (c. 1541–1584) was an Italian composer and organist of Brescia Cathedral, known for his organ pieces.
