= Florence White (campaigner) =

British pensions campaigner

- Born: 11 June 1887
- Died: 1961 (aged 73–74)
- Writing career
- Literary movement: pensions campaigner

Florence White (11 June 1886 - 1961), was a British pensions campaigner. From 1935, she led a campaign to reduce by ten years the retirement age for unmarried women from age 65 to age 55. The campaigning points were

- the relative poverty, ill health, and shorter lifespan of older spinsters compared to married women
- their continued need to work until 65, despite their increasing difficulty in finding employment with advancing age
- their unrecognised role in caring for aged parents, analogous to the caring role of married women with children
- their lesser (and often zero) return for contributions paid into the state pension compared to married women and widows

The campaign ended with partial success in 1941, when all women were made eligible to receive the state pension at age 60, rather than 65.

== Early life ==
Florence was born on 11 June 1886 in Bradford, West Yorkshire to Caroline White (nee Hargreaves) and James White. She was the second of three children. The family lived in Furnace Street, Bowling Back Lane, an area of heavy industry and textile mills. Caroline White was illiterate, and had been employed as a weaver. James White had considerable education, and published poems and political tracts. He had held a variety of jobs in addition to being a musician, but according to Prickett "his real vocation ... was as radical propagandist and street entertainer". He travelled the country selling tracts he had written himself. Any personal influence he had on Florence must have been limited though, as he abandoned his family in 1889 when Florence was not more than three years old, leaving Caroline to support them by taking in washing and baking work. Some of his publications, however, stayed in the family's possession. (These documents were collected by Diana Prickett for her biography of Florence White, and are kept at the West Yorkshire Archive Service in Bradford, along with the manuscript of Diana Prickett's biography. The biography is accessible through a scanned copy on the History to Herstory website.)

The children attended Bowling Back Lane Board School, one of Bradford's first Board Schools after the Forster Education Act of 1870. Florence left school at age 12 to work in local industry (Tankard's carpet mill). This was the most usual form of employment for women in Bradford and other industrial areas at the time.

During the First World War in 1916, White become engaged to Albert Whitehead, but he died a year later of pneumonia.

== Political activity ==
Florence joined the South Bradford Liberal Party and eventually became its Secretary. It was while canvassing for the Party that she became aware of the poor living conditions of some spinsters, who were straitened financially and often in poor health. As employees, spinsters made national health insurance contributions, but premature death before the age of 65 meant that many received no benefits in return.

Responding to this need, Florence (a spinster herself, her fiance having died in the First World War) organised a first meeting for April 9, 1935 at the Bradford Mechanics' Institute. She had arranged for posters and leaflets to be printed, and advertisements to be placed in the Bradford Telegraph & Argus. Interested friends from the Liberal Party were to join Florence on the platform. According to her niece's memoir Florence hoped for about 100 people to attend, but 600 turned out; 300 members were enrolled on the night, and officers elected. The National Spinsters' Pension Association (NSPA) was founded.

One of their first steps was writing to all Bradford MP's to make them 'Spinster Conscious' (one of the campaign's enduring slogans). William Leach, MP for Central Bradford (Labour), became the campaign's chief Parliamentary spokesperson. Four months later 8,000 had joined, with sixteen branches across the north of England by December the same year. Membership grew very rapidly, reflecting the large number of women who had lost fiances in the first world war. By December 1938 membership was 140,000 across 104 branches. Scotland had its own Scottish Women's Pension League.

The NSPA was notable for its energetic, imaginative and good-humoured campaigning methods. A first big rally was held in London in June 1937. Banners from all NSPA branches were paraded to the Kingsway Hall. Each branch was cheered and applauded as they entered, with Florence and supporting MP's on the platform. Tea was served, and parading continued four abreast, to another meeting at Hyde Park, singing

Come Spinsters, Call attention

And show that you're alive,

Arise demand your pension

When you are fifty-five.

There is no earthly reason

To wait another day,

If you will get together

Unitedly and say

We Spinsters call attention

To show that we're alive.

Demand we all our pension

When we are fifty-five.

to the tune of God Bless the Prince of Wales.

Soon after the first rally, a petition of over a million signatures was organised over just four weeks in July 1937. A decorated lorry set off from Bradford and presented the petition to the House of Commons after another rally in Hyde Park. In December the same year, spinsters showered Sir Kingsley Wood, the Minister of Health, with 12,000 Christmas cards bearing the message "Thinking of you this Christmastide and hoping you will be thinking of us". From 1938 a monthly journal The Spinster was circulated to members.

Increasing support from MPs led to a deputation from the House of Commons to Kingsley Wood, asking for an enquiry. It was refused on grounds of expense and the likelihood of encouraging claims from other groups. William Leach MP put forward a Private Member's Bill in early 1938, again proposing an enquiry. By now the campaign had the support of nearly 300 MPs and had achieved widespread press coverage.

In May 1938, an even bigger rally was held in London, with more than 2,000 supporters marching to Kingsway Hall. Florence persuaded Neville Chamberlain to come to a meeting in Birmingham, where he was presented with an umbrella for his seventieth birthday. The rider was that spinsters also needed protection from a rainy day.

The last and biggest rally was held in London in 1939, attracting 3,000 people. Resolutions at an overflowing Kingsway Hall were proposed to the Prime Minister, the Chancellor of the Exchequer, and the Minister of Health. After a final meeting in Hyde Park, Florence and her sister Annie, also a worker for the campaign, went by car to Downing Street and succeeded in handing in the Resolutions, cheered on by hundreds of supporters who had marched from Hyde Park.

The campaign pointed out the large rise in receipts to the National Health Insurance Fund from the corresponding rise in unmarried women who were obliged to work. This was one of many actuarial injustices suffered by spinsters who contributed to the Fund, yet drew little from it in return. In fact a definite formula for calculating the ratio of contributions to benefits was difficult to arrive at. There had been a shift to contributory funding in 1925 which "threw a veil of mystification over the pension scheme, consolidating the political power of the actuaries within Whitehall and providing scope for endless, wearisome arguments over the technical relationship between contributions and benefits" Little daunted by this, Florence and the campaigners continued to mount reasoned financial arguments for their cause.

The requested Committee of Enquiry was finally held on 16 October 1939, and on 23 January 1940 the Chancellor announced that pensions would be paid to insured spinsters and married women at age 60.

== Reception ==
The NSPA often used arguments from parity with other categories of women. This aroused some opposition, leading to accusations of sectionalism and therefore divisiveness, especially from feminists. For example, in parts of the country where women continued to work after marriage (as often happened in industrial areas) a woman who was widowed would receive a widow's pension in addition to her wages. A spinster of the same age working alongside her would likely experience this as unfair, especially since working was virtually compulsory for her in order to even survive. The war widow was seen as unfairly privileged by the NSPA. Florence cited cases of women who had been married for just one day before being widowed (during the first world war) yet were then financially supported for the rest of their lives, unlike the spinster who had to work to support herself.

The NSPA was seen as anti-feminist for claiming that an unfairly high proportion of spinsters' contributions went to subsidise the wives and orphans of male pensioners. The NSPA argued that this subsidy came from the previous contributions of spinsters who had been forced to leave employment in middle age, thereby losing their entitlement to a pension. Others supposedly unfairly benefiting from spinsters' 'lost monies' were mothers receiving maternity benefits. In 1944 Florence protested at the unfairness of being required to pay tax which would fund the new family allowance scheme. This sectionalist attitude drew criticism from feminists, the Labour Party and the TUC.

These sectionalist and divisive arguments were however encouraged by the individualising ideology of the social insurance system. Contributory funding had replaced questions of rights and needs with those of actuarial detail - "Benefits had to be 'paid for' by an individual's contributions; the corollary was that an individual would feel resentment if his or her contributions subsidised other beneficiaries"
