= Don Holtby =

Canadian football coach

Personal information
- Born: March 20, 1937; Ottawa, Ontario, Canada
- Died: January 16, 2005 (aged 67); Ottawa, Ontario, Canada

Career history

Coaching
- 1961: Ottawa Sooners (Asst.)
- 1962–1964: Ottawa Sooners
- 1967–1970: Ottawa Sooners

Operations
- 1964–1982: Ottawa Rough Riders (Canadian Player Dev. Coord.)
- 1971–1980: Ottawa Sooners (President)
- 1983–1986: Ottawa Rough Riders (GM)

Don Holtby (March 20, 1937–January 16, 2005) was a Canadian professional football coach and executive who served as general manager of the Ottawa Rough Riders and president and head coach of the Ottawa Sooners.

== Early life ==
Holtby was born on March 20, 1937, in Ottawa, Ontario. He attended High School of Commerce and was quarterback of the football team. He played five seasons of junior football and tried out for the Ottawa Rough Riders as a receiver and defensive back in 1958.

== Football ==
=== Ottawa Sooners ===
Holtby began his coaching career in 1961 as an assistant with the Ottawa Sooners. He served as the team's head coach from 1962 to 1964 and again from 1967 to 1970. He led the team to the Little Grey Cup national championship game in 1968 and 1969, but they lost to the Saskatoon Hilltops both times. He was the Sooners' president and from 1971 to 1980. During Holtby's tenure as president, the team reached the Little Grey Cup four times (1973, 1974, 1978, and 1979), winning twice ('74 and '79).

=== Ottawa Rough Riders ===
In 1964, Holtby became the Ottawa Rough Riders' co-ordinator of Canadian player development. He signed hundreds of Canadian players to the team, including Jeff Avery, Ian Beckstead, Rick Sowieta, Bob Stephen, and Mark Seale. During his 19 years as Canadian player development co-ordinator, the Rough Riders appeared in six Grey Cups, winning four (1968, 1969, 1973, and 1973). From 1974 to 1982, Holtby also served as the Rough Riders' radio colour commentator. In January 1983, Holtby was promoted to general manager following the resignation of Jake Dunlap. During his tenure, the Rough Riders amassed a 22-43-1 record. Allan Waters sold the Rough Riders after the 1986 season and Holtby resigned to work for Waters' radio station - CFRA.

In 1990, Holtby was inducted into the Ottawa Sport Hall of Fame.

== Radio ==
In 1977, Holtby became the general sales manager of the CFRA. He resigned from the station in 1983 to become Rough Riders general manager, but returned in 1987. In 1990 he became vice-president and general manager of CFRA and CFMO. He later became the vice president and director of sales for CHUM Limited.

== Later life ==
Holtby left CHUM in April 2004 due to chronic obstructive pulmonary disease. He died on January 16, 2005, of pneumonia.
