= Cumberland Panthers =

Canadian football organization

- Sport: Canadian football
- Founded: 1993
- League: National Capital Amateur Football Association (1993–present); Ontario Provincial Football League (2017–2018); Ontario Varsity Football League (2002–2016); Quebec Junior Football League (2004–2012)
- Based in: Ottawa, Ontario, Canada
- Home ground: Millennium Sports Park
- Colours: Royal blue, silver and white

The Cumberland Panthers are a Canadian football organization based in the Orleans area of Ottawa and the largest minor football organization in eastern Canada. The Cumberland Panthers were founded in 1993, starting out in the Mosquito level of the National Capital Amateur Football Association. Progressively, they have increased the number of teams being fielded as their players aged. In 1994, the organization added a team to compete in the Peewee level, followed by Tyke in 1996, and Bantam in 1997. The Panthers previously had three teams competing in the Ontario Provincial Football League in Varsity (Under-20) Junior Varsity (Under-17) and Bantam Varsity (Under-15) levels. In 2004, the Panthers fielded their first Junior Football team, in the Quebec Junior Football League, joining the Ottawa Sooners and Ottawa Junior Riders as the leagues entries from Ontario. The Cumberland Panthers organization also fields Girls' Touch Football teams, as well as Tyke and Mosquito Flag Football teams and a cheer squad. Various training programs are also offered, including Jr Panthers, for ages 5, 6 and 7 and the off-season Varsity training program for players age 15-19. The Panthers wear royal blue, silver, and white uniforms.

The Panthers currently use Millennium Sports Park as their home field.

Notable players

Jesse Luketa

== Championships ==
The Panthers have won multiple NCAFA Championships since joining the league, most recently the 2018 Tyke, Peewee and Bantam City Championship. The Panthers also won the inaugural OPFL Junior Varsity Championship by a score of 28-24 over the Essex Ravens at Queen's University on Aug 6th, 2017.

== Executive ==
President - Mike Schmidt

== Coaches (2019) ==
Bantam NCAFA - Sean Baptise

PeeWee NCAFA - Mike Schmidt

Mosquito NCAFA - Erik Anderson

Tyke NCAFA - Jay Grosset & Steve Pranschke

Jr Panthers NCAFA - Curtis Halderson

Cheer - Jennifer Ouellet

Girls' Touch - Kirk Culkin

== Sources ==
- http://www.cumberlandpanthers.com/
- https://web.archive.org/web/20090517065041/http://www.ncafa.ca/clubs/panthers.html
- https://web.archive.org/web/20090226004824/http://www.ovfootball.ca/pages/ottawa_cumberland_panthers_jr.php
