= Tony Pajaczkowski =

Canadian football player (1936–2022)

No. 66, 67, 56, 52, 50
- Positions: Guard, defensive end

Personal information
- Born: May 31, 1936; Montreal, Quebec, Canada
- Died: June 4, 2022 (aged 86); Port Hope, Ontario, Canada
- Listed height: 6 ft 3 in (1.91 m)
- Listed weight: 225 lb (102 kg)

Career history
- 1955–1965: Calgary Stampeders
- 1966–1967: Montreal Alouettes

Awards and highlights
- 4× CFL All-Star (1962–1965); CFL East All-Star (1966); 5× CFL West All-Star (1960–1963, 1965); CFL's Most Outstanding Canadian Award (1961)
- Canadian Football Hall of Fame (Class of 1988)

Tony Pajaczkowski (/ˌpædʒəˈkaʊski/ PAJ-ə-KOW-skee; May 31, 1936 – June 4, 2022) was a Canadian professional football player. He was an all-star offensive guard in the Canadian Football League (CFL). He was nicknamed "Paj".

Coming from the Verdun Shamcats in Montreal, Pajaczkowski played 11 seasons with the Calgary Stampeders (1955–1965) and two seasons with the Montreal Alouettes (1966–1967). He was a CFL All-Star four times (1962–1965) and won the CFL's Most Outstanding Canadian Award in 1961 (after being runner-up in 1960). He was inducted into the Canadian Football Hall of Fame in 1988.

== Early life and education ==
Pajaczkowski was born on May 31, 1936, in Verdun, Quebec. He attended Catholic High School there, and was named most valuable player of the 1953 Montreal Gazette All-Star football team. He played junior football for the Verdun Shamcats of the Quebec Rugby Football Union (QRFU) in 1954 along with former Catholic High teammate Bob Geary.

== Professional career ==
In December 1954, Pajaczkowski and Geary were signed by the Calgary Stampeders of the Western Interprovincial Football Union (WIFU). Pajaczkowski made the roster in his first year and appeared in 12 games for the 1955 Stampeders at tackle and defensive end, mainly playing on kickoff teams. In 1956, his position was changed to guard by coach Jack Hennemier. Although initially reluctant to change, it was at this position that he became one of the all-time greats of Canadian football. In his first year at guard, Pajaczkowski earned a starting role and appeared in all 16 games as the Stampeders finished 4–12. In addition to playing at guard, he was also used by Calgary as a kicking specialist.

Pajaczkowski signed a contract extension in March 1957. Coach Otis Douglas called him one of Calgary's best Canadian prospects. He continued as starter in 1957, playing in every game as the Stampeders finished third place in the conference with a record of 6–10. On special teams, he made eight kickoffs for 391 yards, a 48.9 average.

Pajaczkowski re-signed with Calgary in May 1958. The Vancouver Sun reported in July that Pajaczkowski was "not far behind" teammate Harry Langford as the league's most outstanding guard. He appeared in every game in 1958, helping Calgary to a record of 6–9–1 and a fourth-place conference finish. After playing in 14 games in 1959, Pajaczkowski was named the team's best lineman by a fan vote. That year, the team compiled a record of 8–8.

Due to pronunciation difficulties, radio announcer Jack Wells refused to mention Pajaczkowski's name (pronounced pa-jə-KOW-skee) in all of the Calgary game broadcasts over a period of three years.

Pajaczkowski appeared in all 16 games in 1960, helping Calgary reach the second round of the WIFU playoffs. In addition to being their starting guard, he was the team's backup kickoff specialist that year, making 27 kickoffs for 1,495 yards, a 55.4 yard average. He was the Stampeders' nominee for the Schenley Most Outstanding Canadian Award and was the runner-up for the honor.

In 1961, Pajaczkowski made 51 kickoffs for 2,845 yards, an average of 55.8 yards per kick, and started all 16 games at guard, being named to the Western Football Conference All-Star team and earning the Most Outstanding Canadian Award. The 1961 Stampeders compiled a record of 7–9.

The following year, Pajaczkowski was named to the CFL All-Star team for the first time in his career. He was one of six Stampeders to be given that honor. He finished that season with 38 kickoffs for 1,955 yards while appearing in all 16 games. In 1963, he was named an all-star for the second consecutive season. He was named an all-star for a third time in 1964 and in 1965 earned his fourth-straight all-star honor. During his four-year all-star streak, he played in all 16 games each season and Calgary had a winning record each year, with four playoff appearances and three appearances in the Western Finals.

On May 19, 1966, Pajaczkowski was traded to the Montreal Alouettes. He played in all 14 games in his first year with the team. After a knee injury in a 1967 practice, he changed his position from right guard to right tackle. In a game against his former team, Calgary, Pajaczkowski was benched for the first time in his career. He announced his retirement in June 1968. He concluded his career having appeared in 198 games, recording 134 kickoffs for 7,159 yards (a 53.4 average) and nine fumble recoveries during that time.

== Later life and death ==
After retiring, Pajaczkowski accepted a position as line coach at Loyola College in Montreal. In 1988, Pajaczkowski was inducted into the Canadian Football Hall of Fame, and in 1996, he was inducted into the Calgary Stampeders Wall of Fame.

Pajaczkowski had dementia in his later years. He lived in Port Hope, Ontario, where he died on June 4, 2022, four days after his 86th birthday.
