= Ottawa Sooners =

Canadian football team in Ottawa

- Sport: Canadian football
- Founded: 1960
- League: Canadian Junior Football League
- Conference: Ontario Football Conference
- Team history: Member of Quebec Junior Football League (1996–2008)
- Based in: Ottawa, Ontario
- Stadium: Keith Harris Stadium
- Colours: Black, orange and white
- Head coach: Tony Canonico
- CJFL Championships: 4 (1974, 1979, 1984, 1992)
- QJFL Championships: 3 (1997, 2001, 2002)
- Website: www.ottawasooners.ca

The Ottawa Sooners are a Canadian football team based in Ottawa. The team plays in the Ontario Football Conference of the Canadian Junior Football League. The team has achieved success during its play in the CJFL, winning a total of four National Championships (1974, 1979, 1984 and 1992). After 35 years of competition (1960–1995) in the CJFL, the Sooners moved to the Quebec Junior Football League for the beginning of the 1996 season. There, the Sooners would win three Manson Cup Championships (1997, 2001 and 2002). The Sooners rejoined the CJFL for the start of the 2009 season. The Sooners have a long history in the city of Ottawa, and while playing in the QJFL they had developed a good rivalry with the Ottawa Junior Riders.

The Sooners play home games at Gee Gees Field located on the campus of University of Ottawa but previously played at the Nepean Sportsplex and Landsdowne Park Stadium.

== Coaches ==
2022 – Kevin Ling
2016 – Geoff Graham
2014–2015 – John Buck
2011–2013 – Matt Murfitt
2009–2011 - Andy McEvoy
2003-2008 - Mike McCarthy
2001–2002 – Barry Gregory
2000 – Carlo Dissipio
1998–1999 – Mark Damiano
1996–1997 – Frank Farinaccio
1995 – Mike Morris
1994 – Wayne Giardino
1991–1993 – Greg Marshall
1989–1990 – Bob Stephen
1988 – Denis Benoit
1987 – Chris Thompson
1985–1986 – Bob St. George
1982–1984 – Jim Daley
1976–1981 – Ace Powell
1975 – Gene Robillard
1972–1974 – Jim Chiarelli
1971 – Matt Anthony
1967–1970 – Don Holtby
1966 – Jock Simpson
1965 – Jack Donaghy
1962–1964 – Don Holtby
1960–1961 – Bruce Hamilton

== Notable former players ==
- Barry Ardern – former Defensive Back for the Ottawa Rough Riders of the CFL.
- Ian Beckstead – former Centre for the Ottawa Rough Riders and Toronto Argonauts of the CFL.
- Mike Blum – former Linebacker for the Ottawa Rough Riders, Toronto Argonauts and Hamilton Tiger-Cats of the CFL.
- Tom Deacon – former Defensive Back for the Ottawa Rough Riders, Winnipeg Blue Bombers of the Canadian Football League
- Jim De Silva – former Offensive Centre for the Ottawa Rough Riders of the CFL.
- Ken Evraire – former Slotback for the Ottawa Rough Riders, Hamilton Tiger-Cats and Saskatchewan Roughriders of the CFL, and former TV personality on A Channel in Ottawa. Currently working for CTV News.
- John Faubert – played for the Toronto Argonauts of the CFL.
- J. T. Hay – former Place Kicker for the Calgary Stampeders of the CFL.
- Darren Joseph – former Running Back in the CFL
- Bob Stephen – former offensive guard for the Ottawa Rough Riders of the CFL.
- Mark Seale – former Defensive Tackle in the CFL
- Rick Sowieta – former Linebacker for the Ottawa Rough Riders and Toronto Argonauts of the CFL.
- Mike Sutherland – former Offensive Guard for the Saskatchewan Roughriders, Montreal Alouettes, Winnipeg Blue Bombers and Ottawa Renegades of the CFL.
- Jeff Turcotte – former Offensive Guard for the Ottawa Rough Riders of the CFL.
- Pat Woodcock – former Wide Receiver for the Hamilton Tiger-Cats, Montreal Alouettes, Edmonton Eskimos and Ottawa Renegades of the CFL, as well as, the New York Giants of the NFL.
- Robbie Nellis – former player, currently an award-winning sommelier in Ottawa.

== Sources ==
- http://www.ottawasooners.ca
- http://www.cjfl.org
- http://www.qjfl.ca
- http://www.ottawasooners.ca
- http://www.footballcanada.com
