= George Dixon (Canadian football) =

Canadian football player and coach

- 1964 Topps CFL card of Dixon

Profile
- Position: Running back

Personal information
- Born: October 19, 1933; New Haven, Connecticut, U.S.
- Died: August 6, 1990 (aged 56); Montreal, Quebec, Canada
- Listed height: 6 ft 0 in (1.83 m)
- Listed weight: 195 lb (88 kg)

Career information
- College: Arnold
- NFL draft: 1959: 9th round, 97th overall pick

Career history
- 1959–1965: Montreal Alouettes

Awards and highlights
- CFL's Most Outstanding Player Award (1962); 2× CFL All-Star (1962, 1963); 2× CFL East All-Star (1962, 1963)
- Canadian Football Hall of Fame (Class of 1974)

George Washington Dixon (October 19, 1933 – August 6, 1990) was a professional Canadian football player and a Canadian Interuniversity Sport football coach.

Dixon starred as a running back for the Montreal Alouettes of the Canadian Football League (CFL), from 1959 to 1965. While Dixon played in only 76 games during his injury-shortened, seven-year career, all with the Alouettes, he is remembered as one of their finest players. Dixon's jersey #28 is one of seven retired by the Alouettes, and he was inducted into the Canadian Football Hall of Fame in 1974. In 2006, Dixon was voted to the Honour Roll of the CFL's Top 50 players of the league's modern era by Canadian sports network TSN. After his playing career ended, Dixon was the head coach of the Loyola College Warriors (now Concordia Stingers) Canadian college football team in the late 1960s-early 1970s.

== College and NFL career ==
Dixon was born in New Haven, Connecticut in 1934, and was a graduate of the nearby Arnold College, where he starred at running back.

Following graduation, Dixon was drafted by the Green Bay Packers in the ninth round (97th pick) of the 1959 NFL draft. His impressive 95 yard kickoff return for a touchdown on August 23, 1959, against the San Francisco 49ers in an exhibition game, was not enough to keep rookie head coach Vince Lombardi from cutting him. Dixon missed out on a chance to be part of one of the NFL's great dynasties, becoming a Canadian Football Hall of Fame member instead.

== CFL career ==
With Verdun Shamcats offensive lineman, and later Alouettes General Manager, Bob Geary blocking for him, Dixon amassed 5,615 yards on 896 carries, for an average of 6.3 yards a carry. He scored 59 touchdowns, 42 by rushing. His best day came on September 5, 1960, when he scored 4 touchdowns against the Ottawa Rough Riders. Dixon rushed for 100 yards in a game 24 times in his career.

Although the Alouettes did not have a winning season during Dixon's time with the club, the Alouettes made the playoffs 5 of the 7 years, losing in the Eastern Division semi-finals in 4 of those years. Dixon will also forever be in the Alouettes, and CFL, record book for his 109-yard longest run from scrimmage, against the Ottawa Rough Riders, on September 2, 1963. He also set the Larks one game rushing record that day, with 235 yards.

Dixon's best season was in 1962, when he rushed for 1,520 yards, was named an Eastern Conference and CFL All-Star and won the CFL's Most Outstanding Player Award. The following, 1963 CFL season was also a good one, with Dixon amassing 1,270 yards rushing and equalling his All-Star honours of the previous year.

Dixon's great accomplishments have not gone unremembered. His uniform number, 28, has been retired by the Alouettes, and he was inducted into the Canadian Football Hall of Fame on May 6, 1974. In November 2006, Dixon was voted to the Honour Roll of the CFL's top 50 players of the league's modern era by Canadian sports network TSN.

== Career regular season rushing statistics ==
Year	Team	Games	Rush	Yards	Y/R	Lg	TD
1959	Montreal Alouettes	7	38	301	7.9	77	1
1960	Montreal Alouettes	12	161	976	6.1	70	9
1961	Montreal Alouettes	11	138	806	5.8	50	7
1962	Montreal Alouettes	14	216	1520	7	75	11
1963	Montreal Alouettes	14	189	1270	6.7	109	10
1964	Montreal Alouettes	12	107	594	5.6	76	4
1965	Montreal Alouettes	6	47	148	3.1	14	0
	CFL Totals	76	896	5615	6.3	109	42

See: https://www.statscrew.com/football/stats/p-dixongeo001

== Later life and death ==
After his playing career ended, Dixon coached the Loyola College Warriors, of Montreal, to great and unexpected success. The following quote is taken from the Concordia University 2006 Sports Hall of Fame induction (Loyola merged with Sir George Williams University to create Concordia in 1974:)

In 1968 when George Dixon took over as head coach of the Loyola Warriors football program, the Loyola of Montreal Athletic Program came out with an article examining the enormity of this challenge. It was titled "Football: Nowhere To Go But Up". The author reported that "Dixon never took on a tougher job." It went on to point out the new coach had inherited an 0-10 team with the worst record in Canada and the worst record in Loyola football history. Thirty-eight years later we pay tribute to the 1968 Loyola Warriors and their championship season. Dixon’s team posted a perfect 6-0 win–loss record to win the Eastern Division of the Central Canada Intercollegiate Football Conference. That year Loyola was the only undefeated team in the country. In six games they scored 201 points while allowing just 18. And only 10 of those points were scored on the impenetrable defence.

Dixon died on August 6, 1990, in Montreal, at the age of 56.

== Videos ==
- Canadian Football Hall of Fame Member - George Dixon on YouTube
