= Scott Gordon (Canadian football) =

Canadian football player (born 1977)

No. 26
- Position: Defensive back

Personal information
- Born: February 21, 1977 (age 49); Ottawa, Ontario, Canada

Career information
- High school: Brookfield
- University: Ottawa
- CFL draft: 2002: 2nd round, 18th overall pick

Career history
- 2002: Calgary Stampeders
- 2002–2005: Saskatchewan Roughriders
- 2006: Hamilton Tiger-Cats
- 2006–2008: Saskatchewan Roughriders
- 2009: Edmonton Eskimos

Awards and highlights
- 95th Grey Cup champion; 36th Vanier Cup champion
- Stats at CFL.ca (archive)

Scott Gordon (born February 21, 1977) is a Canadian former professional football safety who played in the Canadian Football League (CFL). He retired from professional football on May 2, 2010. He played CIS football for the Ottawa Gee-Gees, winning the Vanier Cup in 2000, and junior football for the Ottawa Junior Riders, in the Quebec Junior Football League.
