= Notre-Dame-de-Grace Maple Leafs =

- Founded: 1946
- Folded: 1973
- Based in: Notre-Dame-de-Grace, Quebec, Canada
- League: Quebec Senior Football League; Quebec Juvenile Football League; Quebec Junior Football League
- Nickname(s): NDG Maple Leafs
- League titles: 1946, 1965, 1970

The Notre-Dame-de-Grace Maple Leafs also known as the NDG Maple Leafs were a junior Canadian football team based in the Notre-Dame-de-Grâce neighbourhood of Montreal, Quebec from 1946 to 1973. The Maple Leafs were members of the Quebec Senior Football League from 1946 to 1966, the Quebec Juvenile Football League from 1967 to 1969, and the Quebec Junior Football League from 1970 to 1973.

== History ==
The Maple Leafs won the Quebec junior football championship in their inaugural season. From 1946 to 1973, the club had captured 16 provincial titles, six Eastern Canadian Championships and the Dominion Junior Football championship in 1965. In 1970, the Maple Leafs won their final Quebec title, before losing to the Burlington Braves in the Eastern Canadian final, 22-14. The final game for the Maple Leafs was a loss in the QRFU finals to the Verdun Invictus in 1973.

== Demise ==
At the end of 1973, the Notre-Dame-de-Grace Maple Leafs and the Verdun Invictus were the last two surviving teams from the Quebec Junior Football League. The two teams merged in 1974, becoming the Verdun Maple Leafs, and played in the Canadian Junior Football League until 1980. The Maple Leafs were bought out by a group from the West Island of Montreal, who renamed the team the Montreal Junior Alouettes in 1981. The team changed names again in 1982, to the Montreal Junior Concordes, when the professional franchise, the Montreal Alouettes, changed ownership and name. The Concordes played from 1982 to 1984, when the team folded. They managed to reach the national junior football final in 1982, losing to the Renfrew Trojans by the score of 46 to 0. They were the first Junior team to make the national final from Quebec in 16 years. The next season. they lost to the Ottawa Sooners in the Eastern Canadian final.
