= Cornwall Emards =

The Cornwall Emards were a team in the Quebec Senior Football League and the Quebec Rugby Football Union in the 1950s and 1960s. In 1958 they lost to the Verdun Shamcats in the league championship. In September 1960, the Emards tied with Verdun for first place, the first time since 1934.
