= Millennium Sports Park =

Recreational complex in Ottawa, Ontario

Coordinates: 45.46754°N 75.44916°W

Millennium Sports Park is a 34 hectare sports and recreational complex, consisting of 15 soccer and football fields located at 100 Millennium Blvd in the Orleans sector of Ottawa, Ontario, Canada. The closest major intersection to the Sports Park is Innes Road at Trim Road. The site is currently home to a number of youth sporting clubs in the Eastern half of the Greater Ottawa Area.

Currently, the largest tenants at the facility are Ottawa TFC (formerly known as the Cumberland Cobras) soccer club and the Cumberland Panthers football club.

The Ottawa Outlaws of the American Ultimate Disc League (AUDL) played at Millennium Park Stadium in 2017.

OC Transpo's Millennium station (Ottawa) is located within short walking distance of the complex.

== Sources ==
- http://www.orleansonline.ca/
- http://www.ovfl.ca/
