= Nepean Sportsplex =

Indoor sports facility in Ottawa, Ontario

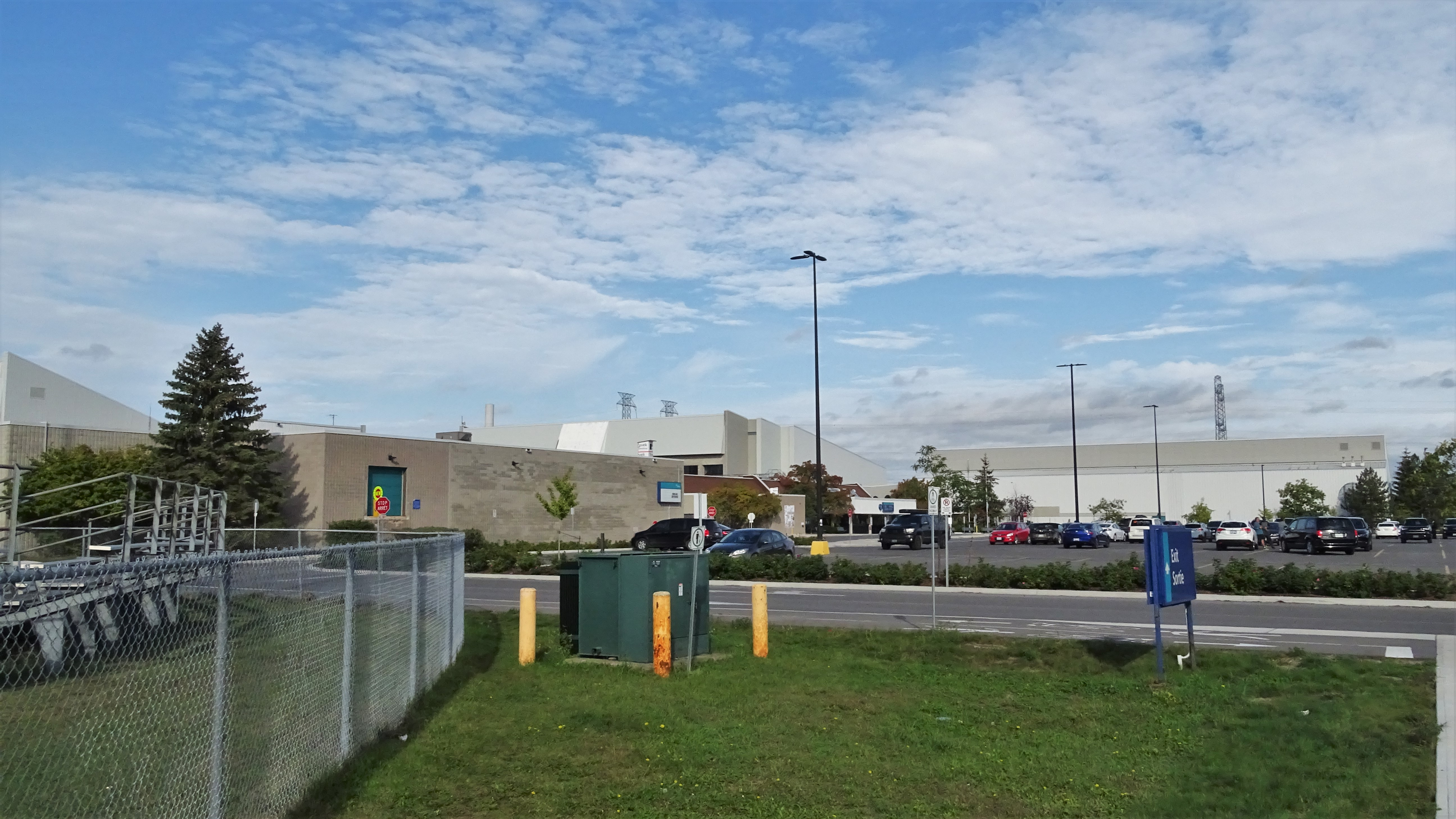
- Interactive map of Nepean Sportsplex
- Address: 1701 Woodroffe Avenue
- Location: Ottawa, Ontario, Canada
- Coordinates: 45.326838°N 75.745293°W
- Owner: City of Ottawa
- Operator: City of Ottawa
- Capacity: 2,200 (Steve Yzerman Arena); 500 (Allen J. MacDonald Arena)
- Record attendance: 2,362 (Game 7 of 2012 Bogart Cup Final)
- Field size: 200 feet (61 m) x 85 feet (26 m) (ice rinks)

Construction
- Groundbreaking: 1971
- Opened: 1973

Tenants
- Nepean Raiders (CCHL) (1973–present); Nepean Jr. Wildcats (OWHL) (2010–present); Ottawa Jr. Riders (QJFL) (2017–present); Nepean Ravens (NRL) (2021–present)

Nepean Sportsplex is a sports facility in Ottawa, Ontario, Canada. It is located at 1701 Woodroffe Avenue north of the Ottawa Greenbelt, near the former Confederation High School along OC Transpo routes 74 and 75 in the former city of Nepean. The facility features an athletics centre (including fitness room) & gym, baseball, soccer and football fields, four squash courts, convention space, swimming pools, lawn bowling, 10 curling sheets, and two NHL-sized rinks.

The 2,200-seat Steve Yzerman Arena inside the building is the home of the Nepean Raiders of the Central Canada Hockey League (CCHL), the Nepean Jr. Wildcats of the Ontario Women's Hockey League (OWHL), as well as the Nepean Ravens of the National Ringette League (NRL). Its football field is the home to the Ottawa Jr. Riders of the Quebec Junior Football League (QJFL).

== History ==
Nepean Sportsplex opened in 1973 as a central facility for the former city of Nepean. In addition to nearby neighbourhoods, the Sportsplex served the community of Barrhaven until the Walter Baker Sports Centre was constructed in 1980. In 1997, the 2,200-seat arena was named the Steve Yzerman Arena in recognition of Steve Yzerman of the Detroit Red Wings, who played with the Nepean Raiders in his youth. The Sportsplex was the site of Ottawa's first mass vaccination clinic during the beginning of COVID-19 pandemic.

The largest crowd to ever see a game at the arena was on April 22, 2012 during Game 4 of the 2012 Bogart Cup Final, when the capacity crowd of 2,362 people saw the Nepean Raiders defeating the Cornwall Colts 4–3 to win the Bogart Cup at home.

== Facilities ==
Nepean Squash Club:

Began with 4 squash courts and an upstairs viewing gallery in 1974 and called itself the Nepean Squash Racquets Club. Then 4 more courts were added in 1976. By 2004, only 6 courts remained to make way for a weight room, and by 2008, only 4 courts remained.

Active membership of over 100 club players with House League, City League, Tournaments, Round Robins, Socials and Lessons.

=== Foyer Gallery ===
The facility includes the Foyer Gallery, an artist-run exhibition space that operates under the auspices of the Foyer Gallery Artists’ Association and the City of Ottawa. The gallery features visual art by established and emerging regional artists.

== Notable events ==
- The facility hosted the 1992 Ontario Tankard, the provincial men's curling championship.
- The facility hosted 8 games in the 2013 IIHF Women's World Championship.
- The facility hosted the 2000 Ontario Nokia Cup, the provincial men's curling championship.
