= TD Place Stadium =

Stadium in Ottawa, Canada

TD Place Stadium Stade Place TD (French)
- Toronto-Dominion Place Stadium at Lansdowne Park; Stade Place Toronto-Dominion au Parc Lansdowne

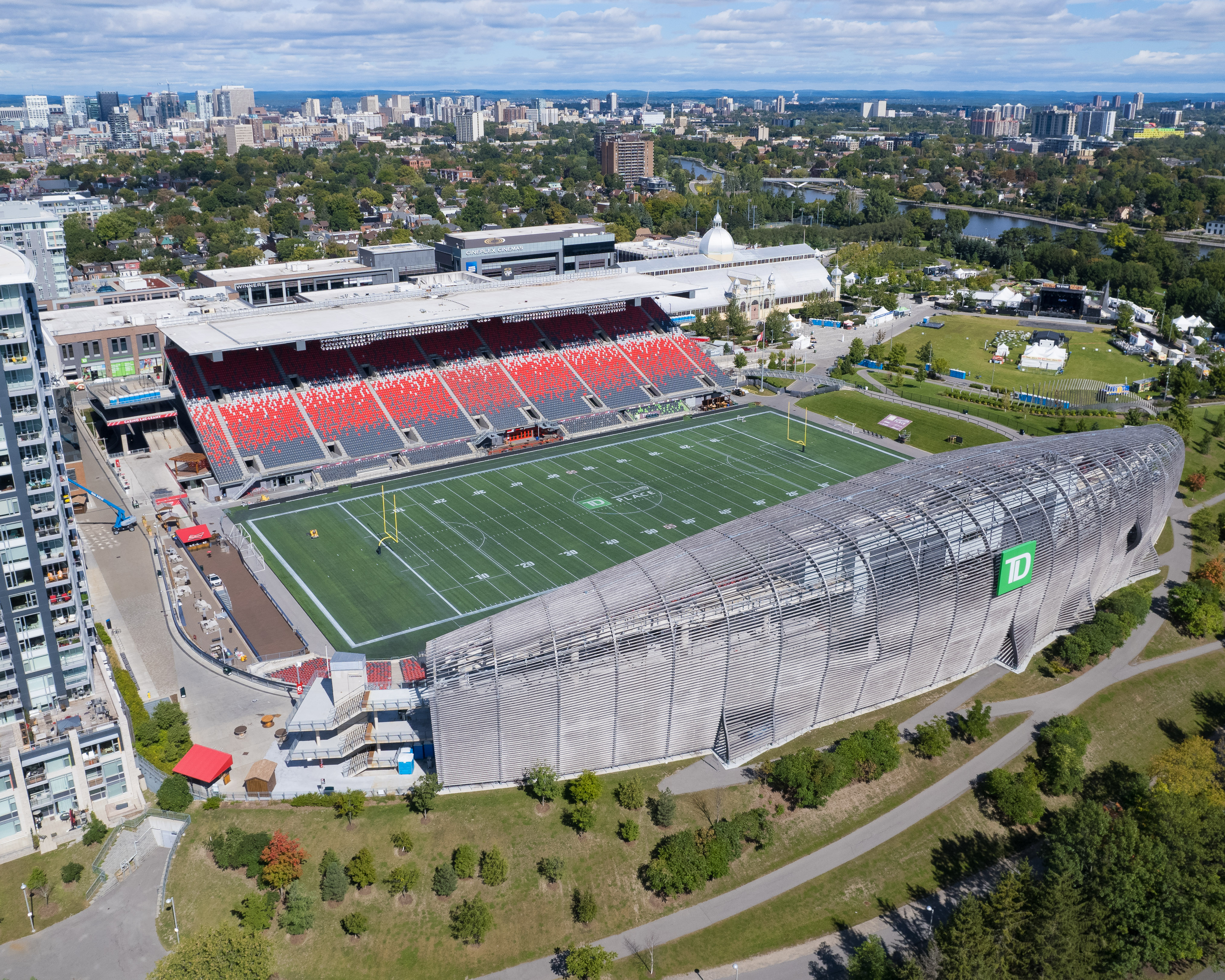
- TD Place Stadium in 2022

- Location in Ottawa Location in Southern Ontario Location in Ontario Location in Canada
- Former names: Lansdowne Park (1908–1993); Frank Clair Stadium (1993–2014)
- Address: 1015 Bank Street
- Location: Ottawa, Ontario, Canada
- Coordinates: 45°23′53″N 75°41′1″W
- Owner: City of Ottawa
- Operator: Ottawa Sports and Entertainment Group
- Capacity: Football: 10,000 (1908–1960); 30,927 (1975–2007); 26,559 (2007–2012); 28,826 (2012–2013); 24,000 (2013–present); Soccer: 6,419–24,000
- Surface: FieldTurf (2001–present)
- Record attendance: 51,242 (92nd Grey Cup)
- Public transit: 6 7

Construction
- Opened: 1908

Tenants
- Canadian football Ottawa Rough Riders (CFL) 1908–1996; Ottawa Junior Riders (QJFL) 1997–2006; Ottawa Renegades (CFL) 2002–2005; Ottawa Redblacks (CFL) 2014–present Ottawa Gee-Gees football (OUA) 2022–present Soccer; Ottawa Fury FC (NASL/USLC) 2014–2019; Atlético Ottawa (CPL) 2020–present Ottawa Rapid FC (NSL) 2025–present Baseball; Ottawa Giants (IL) 1951; Ottawa Athletics (IL) 1952–1954

TD Place Stadium (originally Lansdowne Park and formerly Frank Clair Stadium) is an outdoor stadium in Ottawa, Ontario, Canada. It is located at Lansdowne Park, on the southern edge of The Glebe neighbourhood, where Bank Street crosses the Rideau Canal. It is the home of the Ottawa Redblacks of the Canadian Football League (CFL), Atlético Ottawa of the Canadian Premier League (CPL), Ottawa Rapid FC of the Northern Super League (NSL), and the Ottawa Gee-Gees football team of Ontario University Athletics (OUA), which represent the University of Ottawa.

The playing field has existed since the 1870s, and the complete stadium since 1908. The stadium has been host to FIFA tournaments, Summer Olympic Games, and seven Grey Cups.

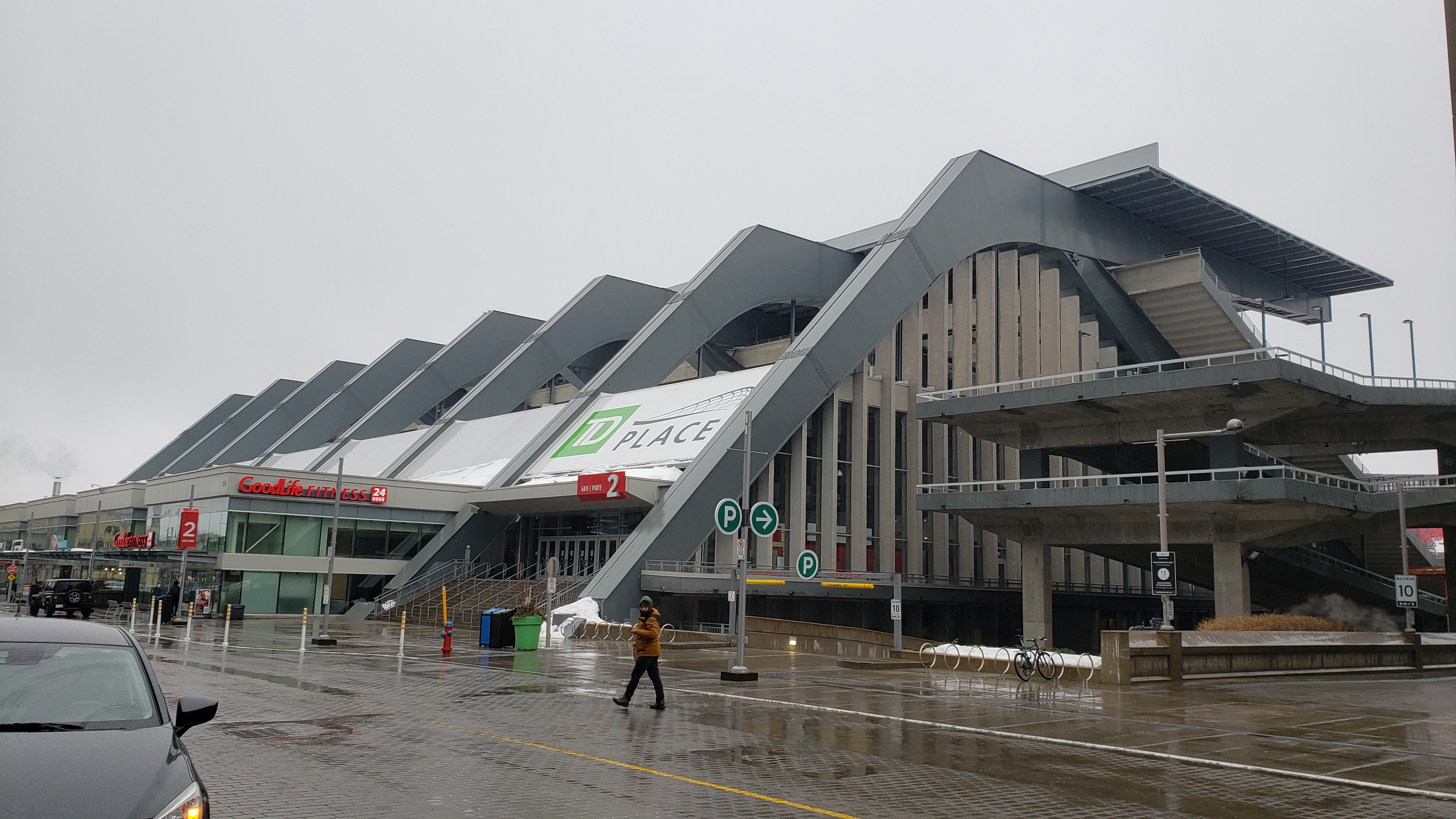
The front entrance of TD Place Stadium in 2023

== History ==
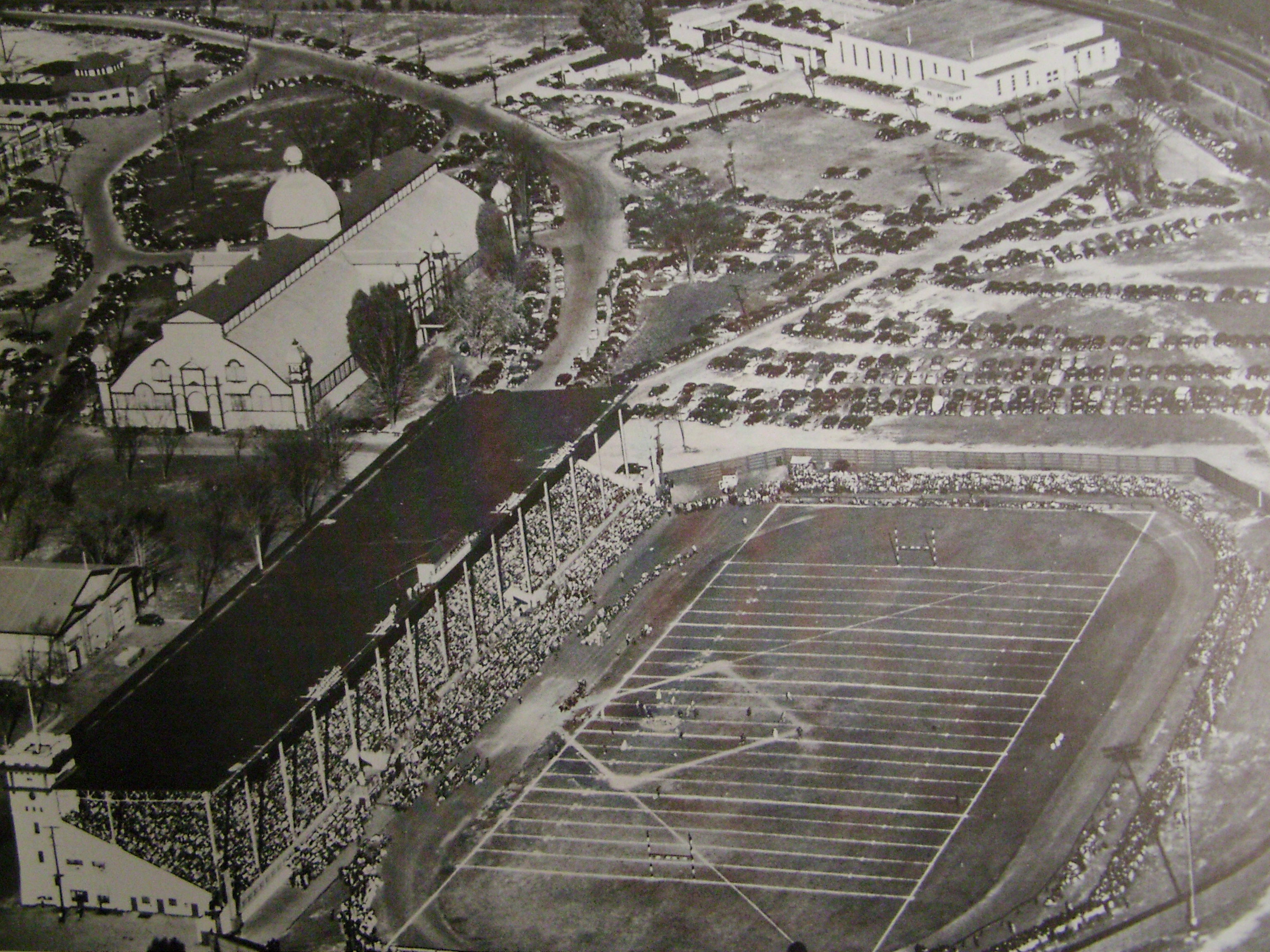
An aerial view of Lansdowne Park in the 1950s

The playing field, part of the Ottawa Exposition Grounds, was first cleared in the 1870s. It was used for equestrian events, lacrosse and rugby football. The first permanent grandstand (a mostly wooden structure) was built on the north side of the playing field in 1908. It was demolished in 1967 to build a new set of steel-framed north stands with an integrated ice hockey arena underneath, then known as the Ottawa Civic Centre.

A small grandstand was built in the 1920s on the south-side of the field, and it was replaced in 1960 by a single-deck concrete stand. A second deck for the south-side was added during the 1970s with a second tier and partial roof, roughly doubling the seating capacity to over 30,000. As of 2008, prior to lower south-side demolition, the overall stadium had a 30,927 capacity for football.

In 1984, the grass field which had been in place from 1908 to 1983, was replaced by Astroturf, which lasted through the 2000 season.

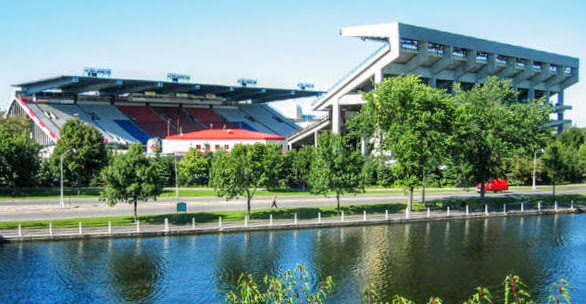
Frank Clair Stadium in 2004

In the late 1990s, the stadium was threatened with demolition when the then-city councillor (and future Ottawa mayor) Jim Watson led a drive by the municipal government to allow a private developer to reconfigure Lansdowne Park. All the proposals submitted called for residences to be built on the site of the football stadium. Massive public opposition and the realization that the end of the stadium would mean the end of hopes for returning CFL football to the capital led the regional government to step in to end the scheme.

In 2001, one year before the Ottawa Renegades began play, the stadium became the first in the CFL to have a next-generation artificial playing surface (FieldTurf) installed.

For many years, the stadium was known as Lansdowne Park, after the fairgrounds in which it was located. It was renamed in 1993 to honour Frank Clair, coach and general manager for the Ottawa Rough Riders during the 1960s and 1970s.

=== Revitalization and reconstruction ===
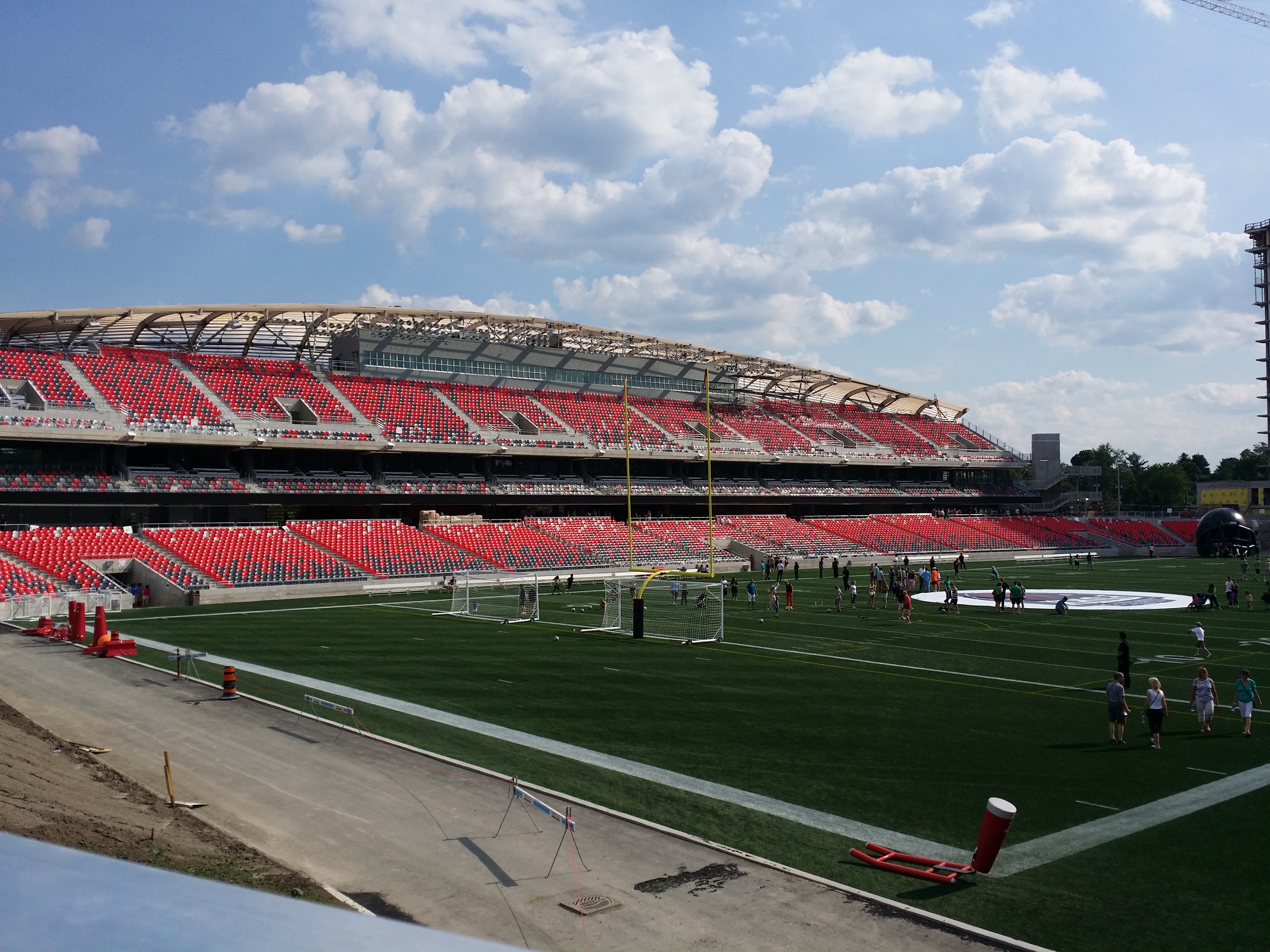
TD Place Stadium after its reconstruction in 2014

In September 2007, the lower south side stands were closed because of cracks in the concrete structure. After the closure of the stands, then-Ottawa mayor Larry O'Brien was quoted saying that this was an opportunity to do a review of the usage and the facilities of Lansdowne Park. Subsequently, a process was started called "Design Lansdowne" to get public consultations on the park and the stadium. After an engineering study of the north-side and south-side grandstands, the south-side stands were condemned. The lower section of the stands was demolished by controlled implosion on July 20, 2008 at 8:03 am.

During the summer of 2008, a consortium of investors was formed to pursue a new CFL team in Ottawa. They bid successfully and received a conditional franchise from the CFL, with the condition that the stadium would need to be upgraded before the franchise could be activated. Jeff Hunt, one of the principal investors and owner of the Ottawa 67's who play in the attached arena, stated that the venue and location are ideal, with over a million people in Ottawa. The organization had reportedly already pre-sold 5,000 season tickets.

In the fall of 2008, the consortium, known as Ottawa Sports and Entertainment Group (OSEG), approached the City with a plan to redevelop Lansdowne Park and rebuild the stadium using the proceeds from turning a section of the park into commercial and retail space. The plan, entitled Lansdowne Live! was ambitious and included plans to redevelop all sections of the park. The City, which had received a competing stadium proposal located in Kanata, reviewed the plans and agreed to a conditional agreement with OSEG. OSEG would concentrate on the stadium and commercial/residential precinct, and Ottawa would return the rest of Lansdowne Park to green space. Faced with opposition to the plan, the City proceeded slowly with the proposal, seeking out legal opinions, traffic studies, and an urban park design competition for Lansdowne.

In June 2010 it was announced that Ottawa City Council had approved a redevelopment plan put forward by OSEG to renovate Frank Clair Stadium and build 350,000 sq ft (33,000 m^{2}) of commercial retail space, 250 housing units and an urban park on the site. The stadium, which was the catalyst to bring the CFL back to Ottawa is to be rent-free to developers for 30 years. Proceeds from the retail and commercial precinct would be shared, and the retail and commercial precinct brought under City control after 30 years. Completion of the overall development was scheduled for 2015.

The OSEG proposal for the stadium envisioned tearing down all of the south-side stands, replacing the stands with a new structure with private boxes and a unique wood-wrapping around the exterior. The north-side stands were to be renovated to current standards, and the north-side exterior expanded to include a retail component. In September 2010, the management group of what would become Ottawa Fury FC joined the plan to redevelop Lansdowne. On June 20, 2011, Ottawa was awarded a professional soccer franchise in the North American Soccer League (NASL) to start play in 2014.

In November 2011, demolition of the rest of the south side stands started. The contract to demolish the stands was awarded for CA$0.55 million (equivalent to $0.75 million in 2025). Unlike the lower stands, the upper stands structure was demolished piece-by-piece rather than controlled implosion. The concrete and steel from the structure was recycled, and the seats re-used at a new skating and hockey rink at Ottawa City Hall. Demolition was completed by January 2012.

On January 7, 2014, Frank Clair Stadium and the Civic Centre Arena were jointly renamed TD Place under a new 10-year sponsorship deal with the Toronto-Dominion Bank.

The stadium renovations were completed in time for the first Ottawa Redblacks home game on July 18, 2014. The Ottawa Fury opened their fall season on the same weekend after playing their previous home games that year at Keith Harris Stadium at Carleton University.

On October 29, 2014, the press box and media centre at the stadium were named for Ernie Calcutt, a former broadcaster for the Ottawa Rough Riders.

In November 2025, Ottawa City Council approved the "Lansdowne 2.0" redevelopment plan, which includes demolishing and rebuilding the stadium's aging north-side stands after the 2027 CFL season, as well as a new arena and other site upgrades.

=== Tenants ===
The Ottawa Rough Riders football team and its predecessors played at the field from their inception in 1876 until 1996, when the team ceased operations. A successor team, the Ottawa Renegades, played at the stadium from 2002 until 2005. Ottawa's third CFL team, the Redblacks, have played at the stadium since 2014.

From the 1870s onward, the field was also home to University of Ottawa's Gee-Gees football team and in 2021, the Gee-Gees shifted all their home games to TD Place Stadium as part of a partnership with the stadium’s operators. The stadium is home to the Panda Game, an annual game between the cross-city rivals, the Carleton University Ravens and the Gee-Gees, which in recent years has drawn sellout crowds of around 24,000, the largest of any Canadian university football event. At the Panda Game in 1987, the game was marred by an accident when at least 25 students were injured when a section of railing collapsed and the result was forfeited.

The stadium has also been home to the Ottawa Junior Riders of the Quebec Junior Football League and the semi-pro Ottawa Bootleggers of the Empire Football League.

The field was even configured for minor league baseball in the early 1950s. It served as the home ballpark for the Ottawa Giants of the International League in 1951, and for the Ottawa Athletics from 1952 to 1954 after the Philadelphia Athletics purchased the franchise and kept it in Ottawa.

Ottawa Fury FC were the first professional soccer club to play in the renovated TD Place Stadium, playing from the start of the 2014 fall season of the North American Soccer League until the end of the 2019 fall season of the USL Championship. The top-tier Canadian professional club Atlético Ottawa joined the Canadian Premier League in the 2020 season, with TD Place as its home ground. The Northern Super League team Ottawa Rapid FC play in the stadium, having kicked off their inaugural season in April 2025.

== Major events ==
=== Football ===
The stadium has played host to seven Grey Cup games, the first occasion being in 1925 when Ottawa won its first Grey Cup title. It later held Grey Cup games in 1939, 1967, 1988, and 2004. On July 31, 2016, the CFL awarded Ottawa the 105th Grey Cup game, which was played at TD Place Stadium in late 2017, as part of celebrations to mark 150 years of Confederation. The 55th Grey Cup in 1967 was similarly played at Lansdowne Park as part of celebrations to mark the Centennial of Confederation.

The stadium has hosted the Panda Game, a Canadian rivalry football game between the two OUA football teams in Ottawa, the University of Ottawa Gee-Gees and Carleton University Ravens, during the years that a CFL tenant has occupied the venue. This is one of the oldest and richest rivalries in Canadian university football, and currently the most attended Canadian university football game. Because these universities are not beneficiaries of the naming rights agreement, some sources prefer to use the name "Lansdowne Park" for the Panda Game venue, although unlike for international soccer (see below), this is not an official policy.

=== Soccer ===
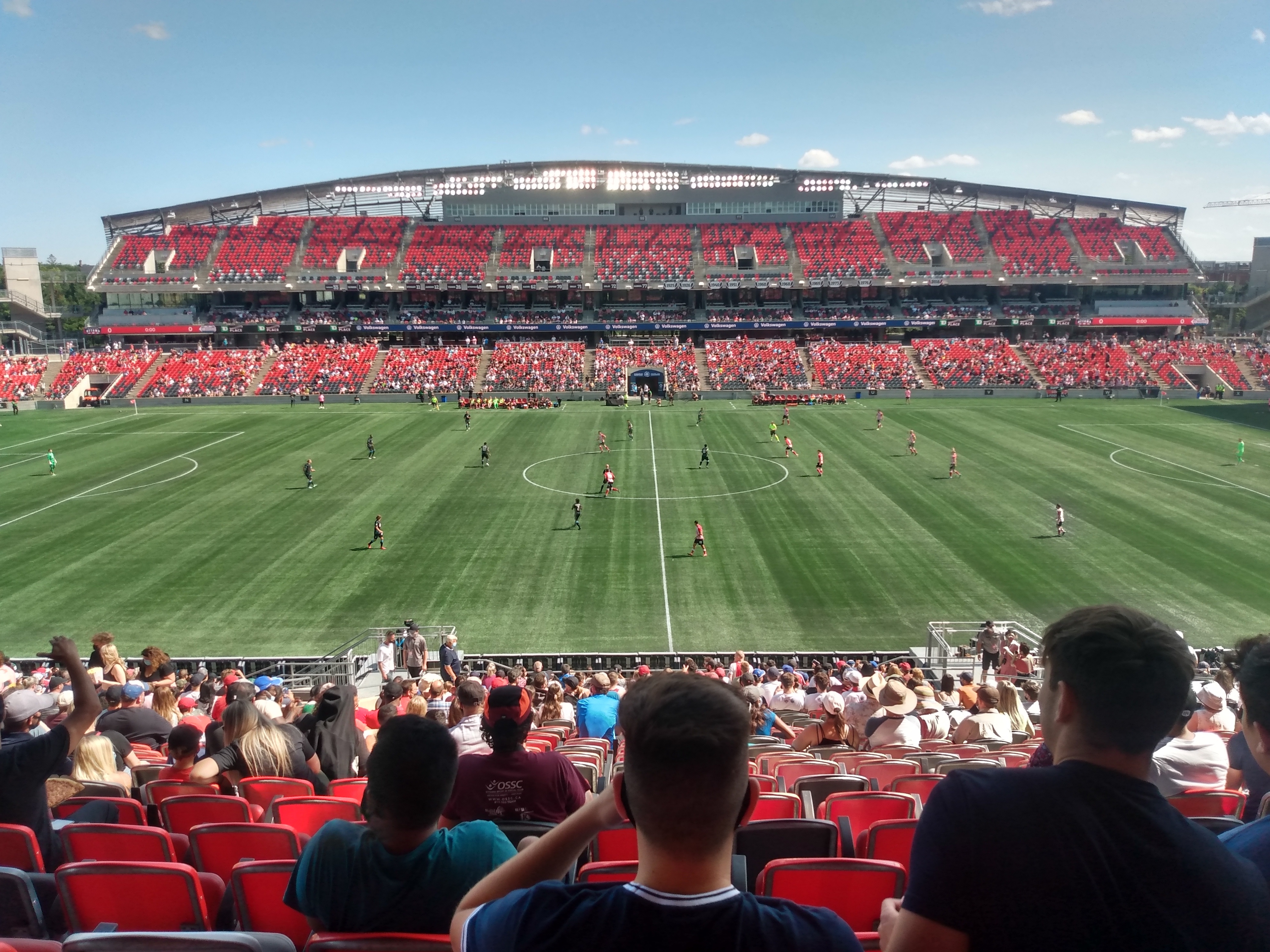
An Atlético Ottawa match in the Canadian Premier League

During the 1976 Summer Olympics in Montreal, the stadium hosted five soccer matches.

In mid-2007, the stadium was one of six hosts in the 2007 FIFA U-20 World Cup. Capacity was then listed at 28,826.

In 2014, Ottawa Fury FC joined the North American Soccer League (NASL) and reached an agreement to use the stadium as its home grounds.

The stadium was one of six chosen venues to host matches for the 2015 FIFA Women's World Cup; it hosted a total of six group stage matches, two Round of 16 matches, and one quarter-final match. Due to FIFA policy forbidding commercial sponsorship of stadium names, the stadium was temporarily referred to as "Lansdowne Stadium" during the tournament.

A portion of FieldTurf and some field-level stands set up for soccer matches suffered minor fire damage on July 18, 2018, during the Fury FC home leg of the 2018 Canadian Championship semifinal against Toronto FC. The cause was lit flares brought in by some members of a Toronto supporters' group, the "Inebriatti", which ignited one of their banners. Also, at least one firework was detonated during the incident.

In 2019, Ottawa Fury ceased operations after it lost its sanctioning to play in the USL Championship and refused to join the Canadian Premier League (CPL). In 2020, Atlético Ottawa joined the Canadian Premier League, representing Ottawa, using TD Place Stadium as its home grounds.

In 2025, Ottawa Rapid FC of the new Northern Super League made its debut at TD Place Stadium, winning its inaugural home match 2–1 in front of 6,980 spectators.

==== 2015 FIFA Women's World Cup matches ====
Date	Team #1	Result	Team #2	Round	Attendance
June 7, 2015	Norway	3–0	Thailand	Group B	20,953
June 7, 2015	Germany	10–0	Ivory Coast	Group B	20,953
June 11, 2015	Germany	1–1	Norway	Group B	18,987
June 11, 2015	Ivory Coast	2–3	Thailand	Group B	18,987
June 17, 2015	Mexico	0–5	France	Group F	21,562
June 17, 2015	South Korea	2–1	Spain	Group E	21,562
June 16, 2015	Ecuador	0–1	Japan	Group C	14,522
June 20, 2015	Germany	4–1	Sweden	Round of 16	20,953
June 22, 2015	Norway	1–2	England	Round of 16	19,829
June 26, 2015	China	0–1	United States	Quarterfinals	24,141

=== Rugby union ===
On 27 February 2024, TD Place Stadium was announced as the host venue for two Canadian international rugby union matches, against Scotland on 6 July 2024 and against Romania on 12 July.

The Scotland match drew a crowd of 11,447, a record attendance for rugby at the stadium, with Scotland winning 73–12. Six days later, on July 12, Canada defeated Romania 35–22, marking Canada’s first test win over Romania since 1995.

=== Hockey ===
On March 17, 2017, the National Hockey League announced that it would hold an outdoor game at TD Place Stadium between the Ottawa Senators and Montreal Canadiens on December 16, 2017 to mark the 100th anniversary of their inaugural NHL game. Due to sponsorship issues (Scotiabank, a competitor in Canadian banking, was the title sponsor of the game itself), the venue was known as "Lansdowne Stadium" for the game.

Date	Away team	Result	Home team	Spectators
December 16, 2017	Montreal Canadiens	0–3	Ottawa Senators	33,959
December 17, 2017	Gatineau Olympiques	4–1	Ottawa 67's	11,671

=== Concerts ===
Date	Artist(s)	Opening act(s)	Tour	Tickets sold	Revenue	Additional notes
August 28, 1987	David Bowie	Duran Duran; Eight Seconds; The Northern Pikes	Glass Spider Tour	29,000	—	This concert drew the largest crowd for an Ottawa concert ever at the time.
September 9, 1987	Pink Floyd	—	A Momentary Lapse of Reason Tour	26,062 / 35,000	$495,099	
August 5, 1990	New Kids on the Block	—	The Magic Summer Tour	30,000 / 30,000	—	
August 14, 1998	Various Artists		Lilith Fair	—	—	
August 28, 2005	The Rolling Stones	Les Trois Accords; Our Lady Peace	A Bigger Bang	43,000	—	
September 3, 2015	AC/DC	Vintage Trouble	Rock or Bust World Tour	32,000 / 32,000	—	The first major concert event at the renovated TD Place Stadium.
August 21, 2017	Guns N' Roses	Our Lady Peace	Not in This Lifetime... Tour	21,204 / 25,714	$2,144,550	

== Gallery ==
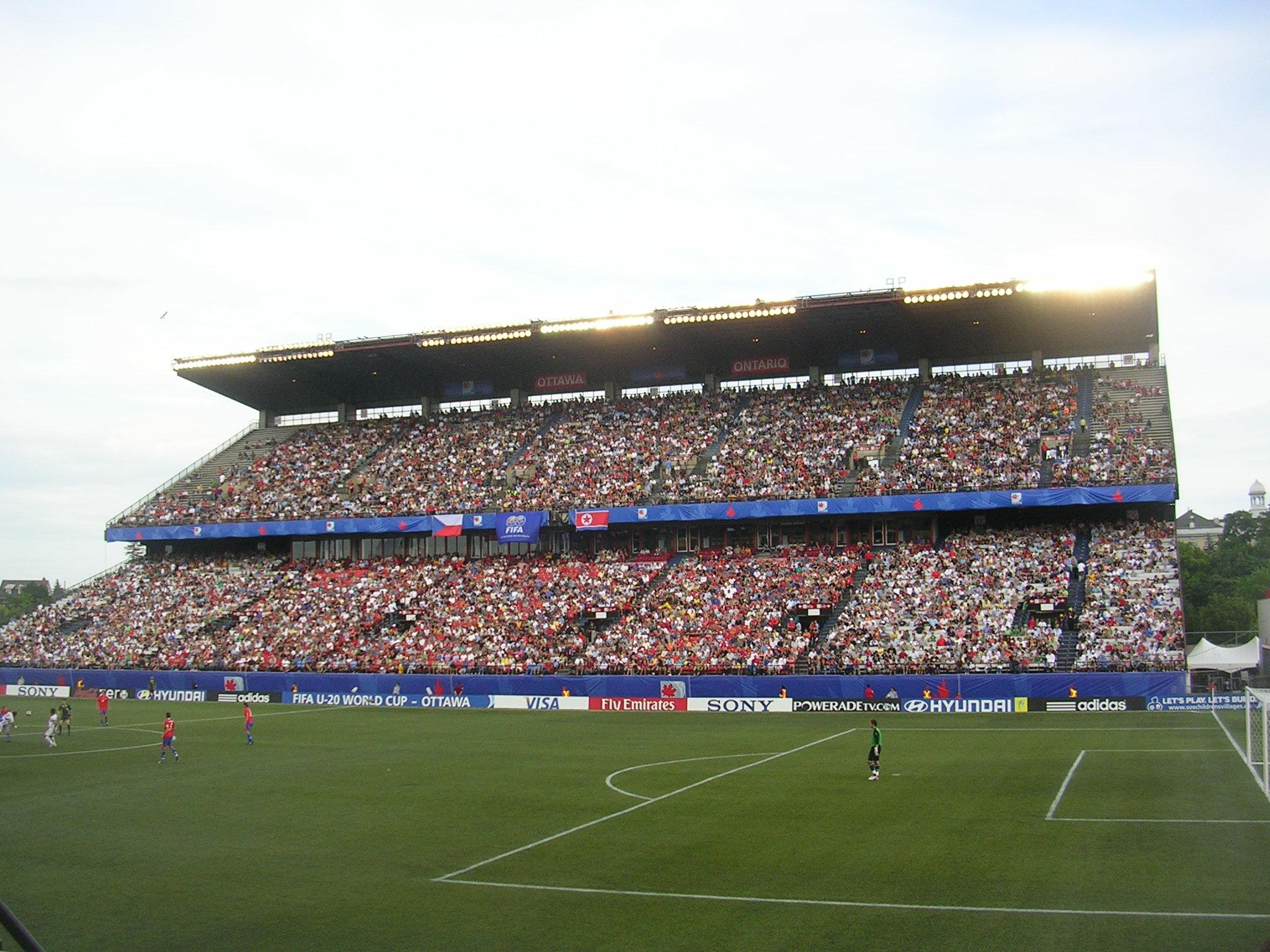
The now-demolished south side stands during a soccer game

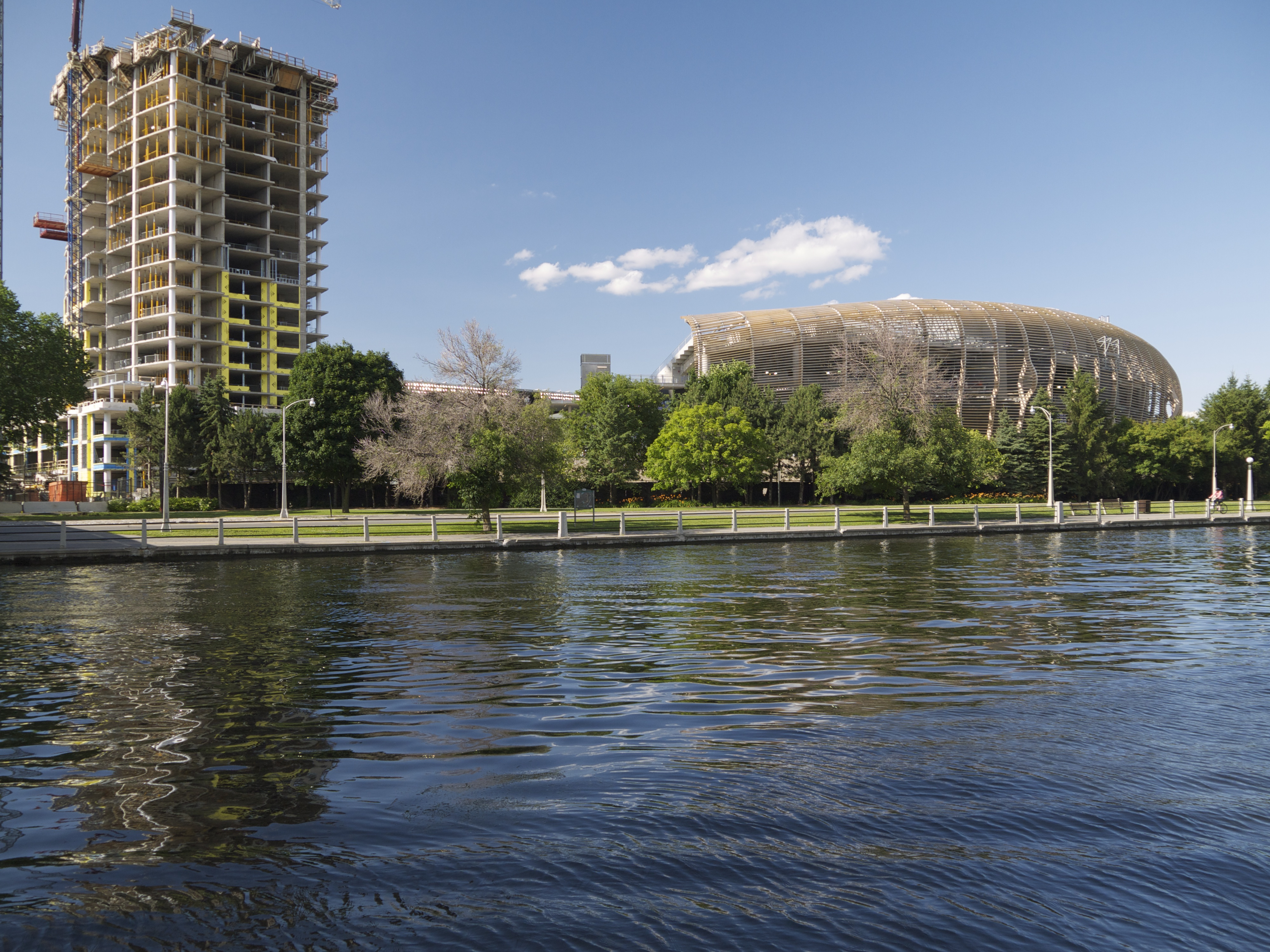
TD Place Stadium viewed from across the Rideau Canal in 2014

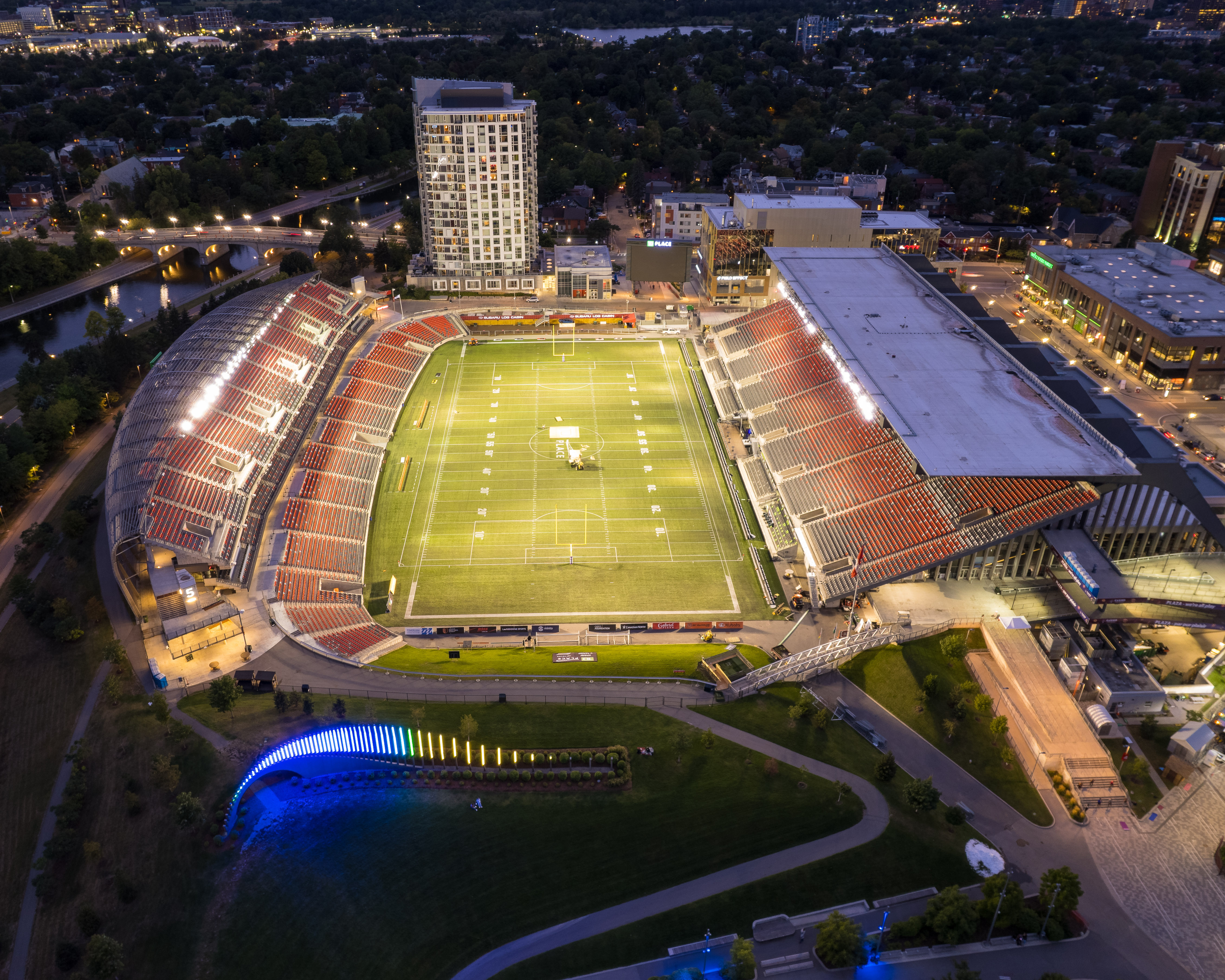
TD Place Stadium at night in September 2021

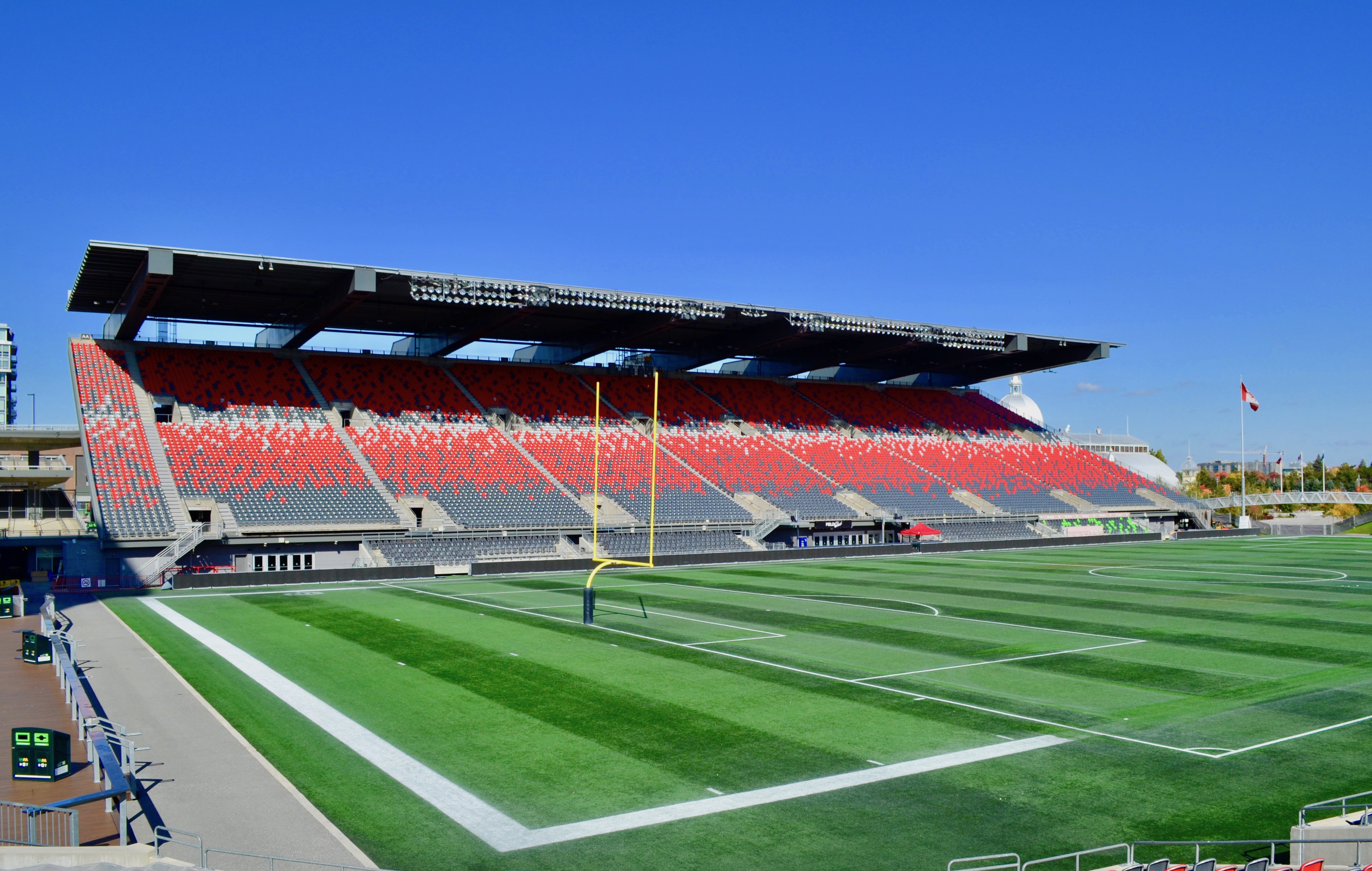
North stand

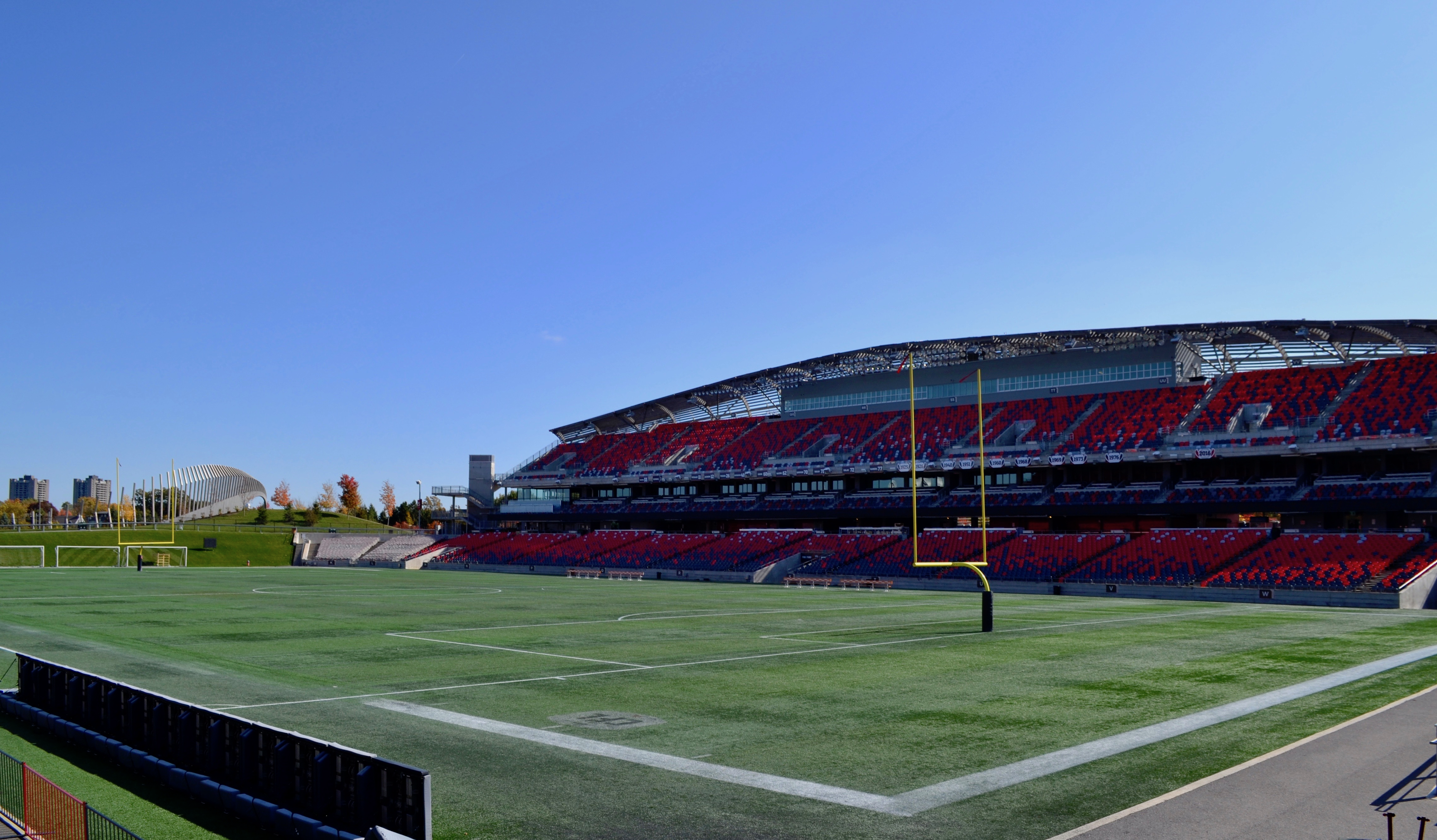
South stand

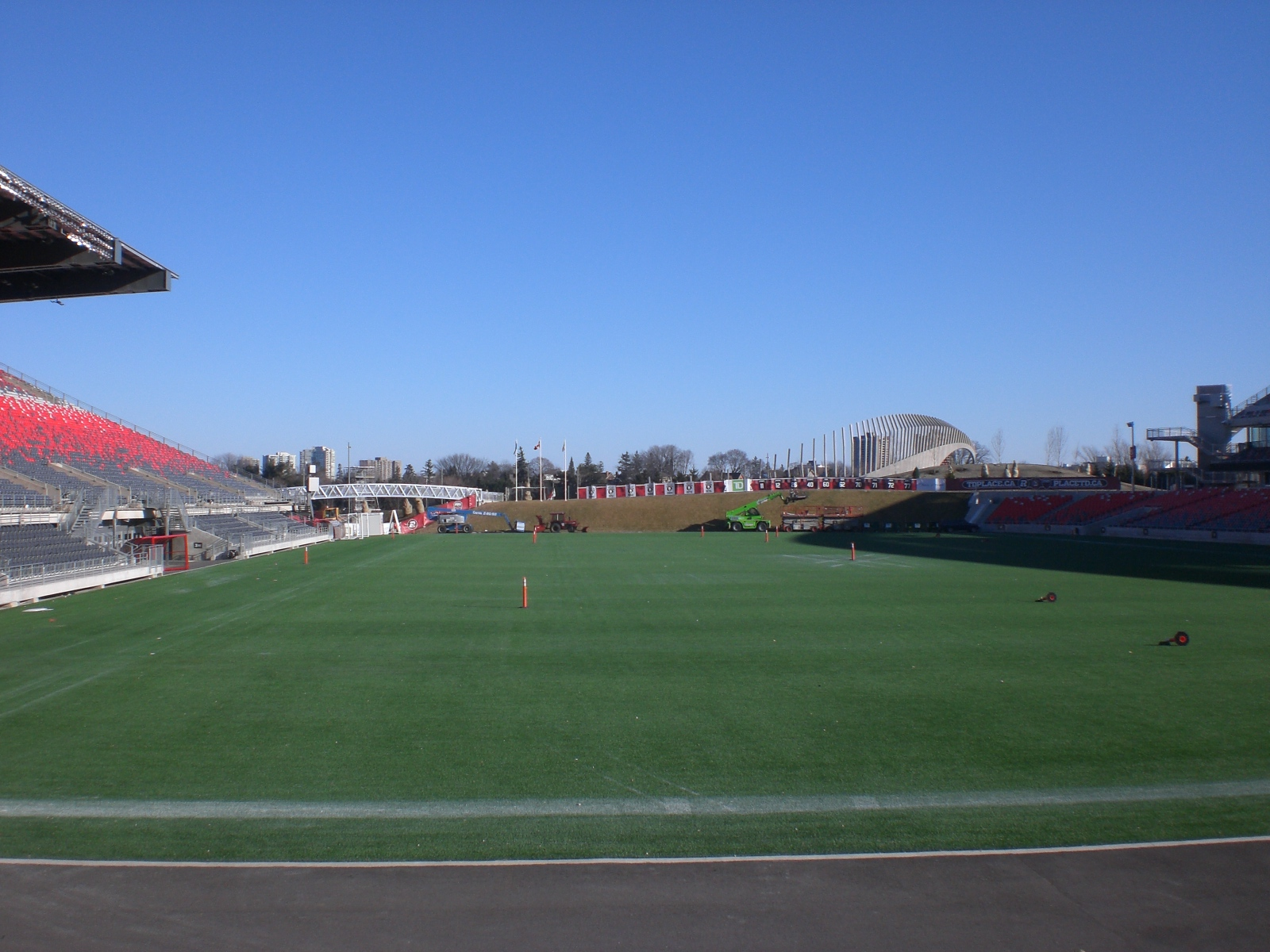
Field

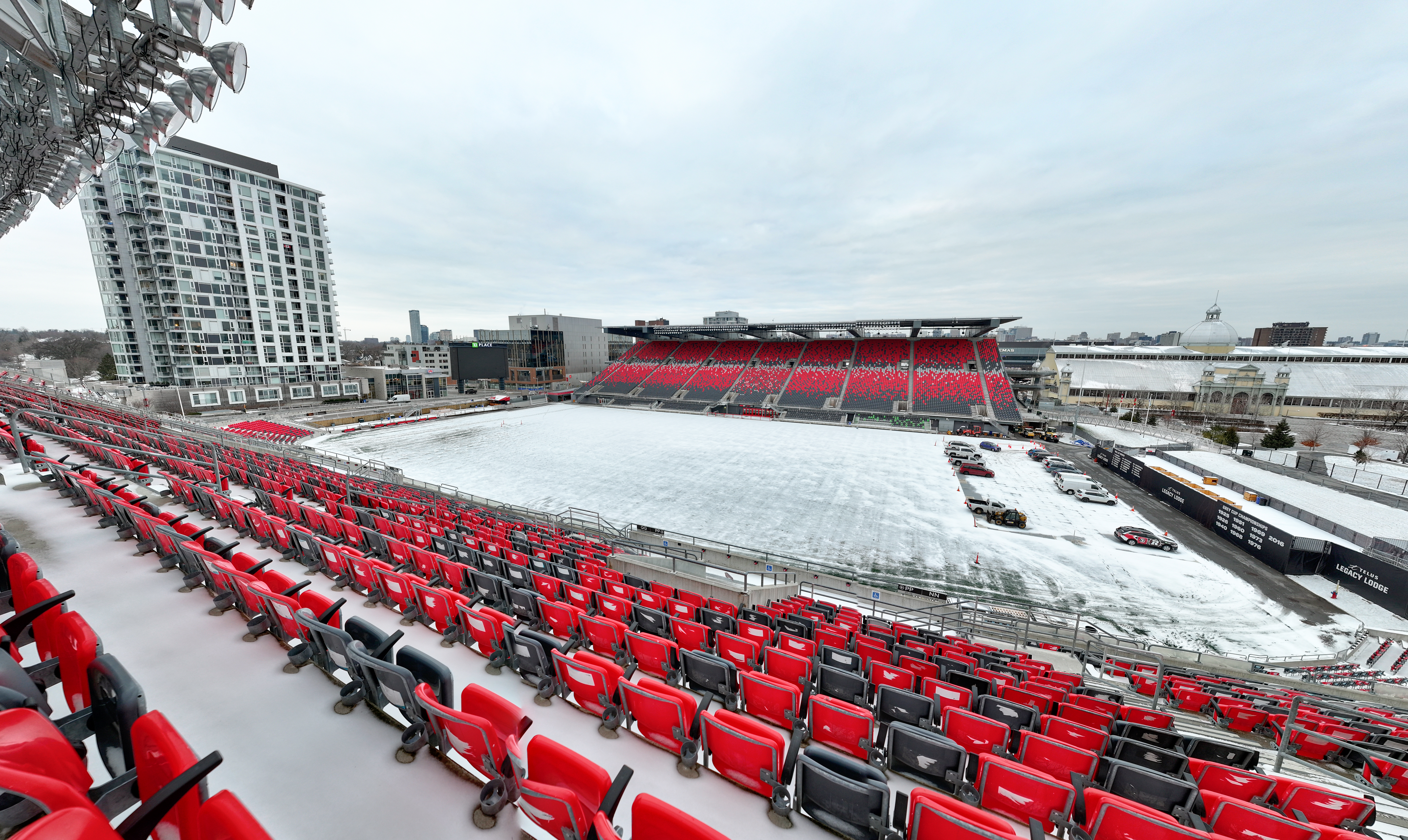
Snowy stadium in 2023

== See also ==
- List of stadiums in Canada
- List of Canadian Football League stadiums
- List of Canadian Premier League stadiums
- TD Place Arena
