= Sir Wilfrid Laurier Secondary School (Ottawa) =

Location
- 1515 Tenth Line Road; Ottawa, Ontario, K1E 3E8; Canada; 45.473059°N 75.493391°W

Information
- Motto: We Strive for the Highest / Wil Power
- Opened: 1966
- School board: Ottawa Carleton District School Board
- Superintendent: Mary Jane Farrish
- Area trustee: Keith Penny
- Principal: Tim Hawes
- Grades: 9–12
- Enrollment: 995 (2022)
- Campus: Suburban
- Colours: Maroon, white and navy
- Team name: Lancers
- Feeder schools: Dunning-Foubert Elementary, Fallingbrook Community Elementary, Maple Ridge Elementary, Trillium Elementary, Summerside Public
- Website: sirwil.ca

Sir Wilfrid Laurier Secondary School (formerly Sir Wilfrid Laurier High School) is a public high school located in the Fallingbrook neighbourhood within the suburb of Orléans in Ottawa, Ontario, Canada. The school is under the jurisdiction of the Ottawa-Carleton District School Board.

Sir Wilfrid Laurier Secondary School was originally located on Carsons Road which was then part of the City of Gloucester. The school primarily served the neighbourhoods of Carson Grove and Pineview. In 1992, the school relocated to their current location on Tenth Line Road in Orleans which was then part of Cumberland Township. The former location is now used by Collège catholique Samuel-Genest.

The school is directly connected to the Ray Friel Recreational Complex which features a swimming pool, skating rink, a branch of the Ottawa Public Library, a branch of the Eastern Ottawa Resource Centre, and the River Heights Children Centre.

Each school day consists of four seventy-five minute periods. Sir Wilfrid Laurier Secondary School offers a number of special academic opportunities for students such as a co-operative education program, Specialist High Skills Major (SHSM) programs, and dual course programs with Algonquin College. The school also offers special education for students who require additional support including in-class IEPs and specially trained educators.

Sir Wilfrid Laurier Secondary School offers a variety of varsity and intramural sports including golf, football, cross-country running, basketball, soccer, volleyball, tennis, ultimate, rugby, badminton, ice hockey, cross-country skiing, curling, downhill skiing/snowboarding, swimming, touch football, track and field, baseball, and softball.

== Notable alumni ==
- Richard Adu-Bobie – Sprinter
- Jackson Bennett - Football player
- Brendan Gillanders – Football player
- Kurleigh Gittens Jr. - Football player
- Obby Khan – Former Football player and former Leader of the Official Opposition in Manitoba
- Momin Khawaja – Terrorist
- Alex Lacasse – Singer/songwriter
- Mark Seale – Football player
- Melinda Shankar – Actress

== See also ==
- Education in Ontario
- List of secondary schools in Ontario
