= Brendan Gillanders =

Canadian football player (born 1990)

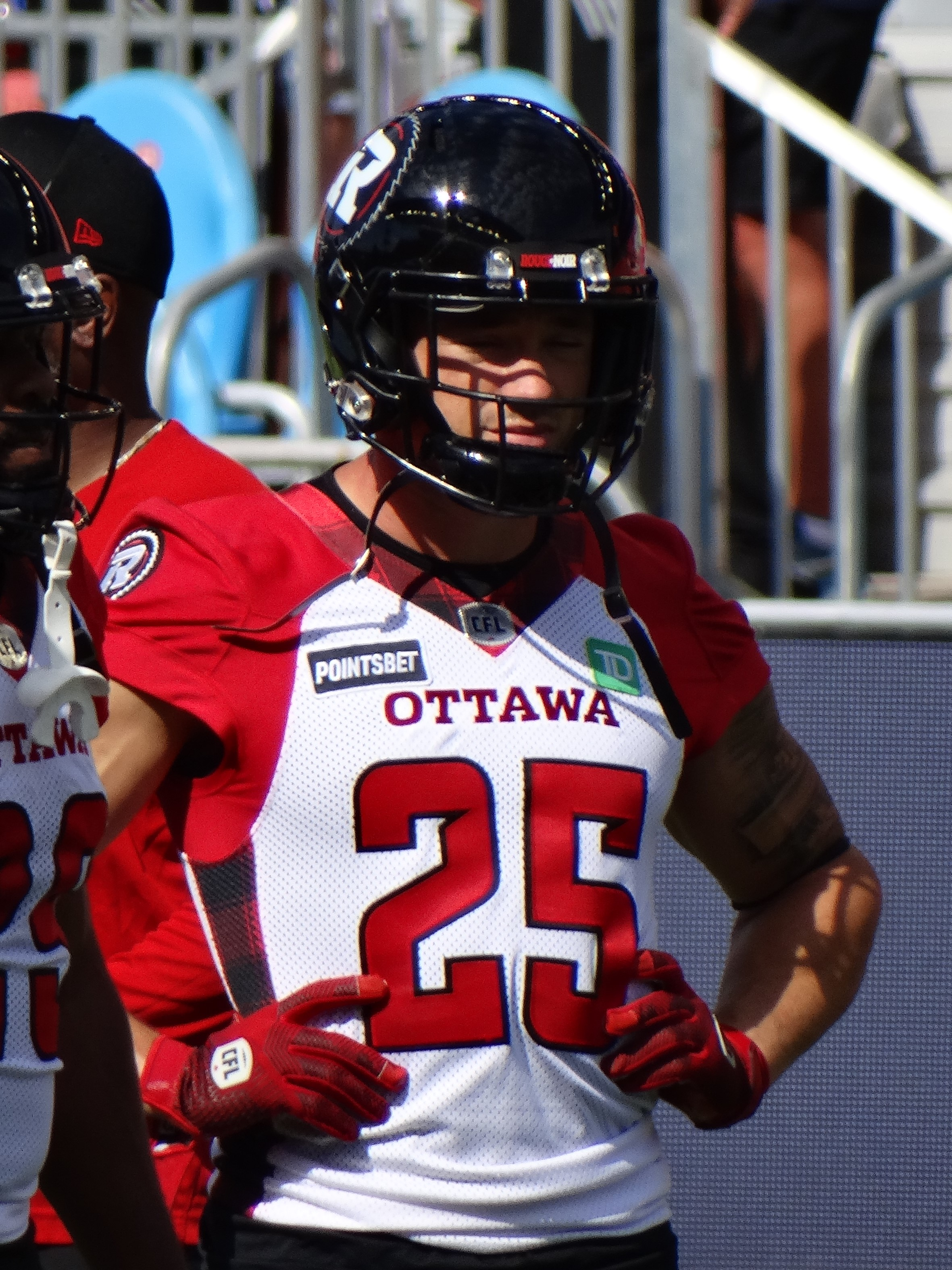
- Gillanders with the Ottawa Redblacks in 2022

No. 45, 25
- Positions: Running back, fullback

Personal information
- Born: November 27, 1990 (age 35); Orleans, Ontario, Canada
- Listed height: 5 ft 11 in (1.80 m)
- Listed weight: 213 lb (97 kg)

Career information
- High school: Sir Wilfrid Laurier (Ottawa)
- University: Ottawa (2009–2013)

Career history
- 2014–2015: Toronto Argonauts
- 2016–2022: Ottawa Redblacks

Awards and highlights
- Grey Cup champion (2016); First-team OUA all-star (2013)
- Stats at CFL.ca

Brendan Gillanders (born November 27, 1990) is a Canadian former professional football running back who played for the Toronto Argonauts and Ottawa Redblacks of the Canadian Football League (CFL). He played CIS football at the University of Ottawa.

== Early life ==
Brendan Gillanders was born on November 27, 1990, in Orleans, Ontario. He attended Sir Wilfrid Laurier Secondary School in Ottawa. His favorite player growing up was Ottawa Renegades running back Josh Ranek.

== University career ==
Gillanders played CIS football for the Ottawa Gee-Gees from 2009 to 2013. After earning the starting job in 2010, he broke his leg on his first carry as the starter. He played eight games in 2011, rushing 132 times for 767 yards and six touchdowns while also catching 17 passes for 207 yards. Gillanders appeared in eight games in 2012, accumulating 123 carries for 768 yards and nine touchdowns, and nine catches for 65 yards. As a senior in 2013, he recorded 109 rushing attempts for 740 yards and two touchdowns, and 34 receptions for 321 yards and three touchdowns, earning first-team Ontario University Athletics all-star honors. His 1,061 all-purpose yards were the most by any CIS running back that season.

== Professional career ==
Among running backs at the 2013 CFL Combine, Gillanders posted the fastest 40-yard dash (4.5s) and highest vertical jump (41"). He was also second in the bench press (23 reps) among running backs. He suffered a lisfranc dislocation on the second day of the Combine. He went undrafted in the 2013 CFL draft and returned to school for his final season of CIS football.

Gillanders was signed by the Toronto Argonauts of the CFL on December 18, 2013. He dressed in 13 games for the Argonauts in 2014, posting six special teams tackles. He dressed in 17 games during the 2015 season, rushing once for 11 yards, catching seven passes for 104 yards, and making 14 special teams tackles. He became a free agent after the season.

Gillanders signed with the CFL's Ottawa Redblacks on February 9, 2016. He dressed in ten games for the Redbacks in 2016, totaling six carries for 23 yards, three receptions for 28 yards, one defensive tackle, and four special teams tackles. On November 27, 2016, the Redblacks beat the Calgary Stampeders in the 104th Grey Cup by a score of 39–33. He dressed in all 18 games for the first time in 2017, accumulating 21 carries for 133 yards, four catches for 31 yards, 12 special teams tackles, one fumble, and one fumble recovery. Gillanders dressed in all 18 games for the second straight season in 2018, recording six rushing attempts for 14 yards, seven receptions for 55 yards, eight special teams tackles, and one two-point conversion. The 2018 Redblacks advanced to the 106th Grey Cup, where they lost to the Calgary Stampeders 27–16. He dressed in 16 games, including his first three CFL starts, during the 2019 season, totaling 23 carries for 94 yards, 16 catches for 97 yards, 14 special teams tackles, one fumble recovery, and one two-point conversion. The 2020 CFL season was cancelled due to the COVID-19 pandemic in Canada. Gillanders dressed in eight games for the Redblacks in 2021, rushing four times for seven yards, catching one pass for 23 yards, blocking one kick, and posting one special teams tackle. He dressed in 16 games, starting one, during his final CFL season in 2022, recording five rushing attempts for 20 yards and one reception for six yards. He was the Redblacks' nominee for the Jake Gaudaur Veterans' Trophy in 2022. He announced his retirement in January 2023.

== Personal life ==
During the CFL offseasons, Gillanders worked as a strength and conditioning coach and also volunteered for several youth football teams in the Ottawa area. After his retirement, Gillanders became the national client engagement manager for the sports supplements company Athletic Alliance.
