= Barclay Allen =

Canadian football player (born 1945)

Profile
- Positions: Quarterback, Defensive back, Wide receiver

Personal information
- Born: June 23, 1945 (age 81)
- Listed height: 6 ft 2 in (1.88 m)
- Listed weight: 200 lb (91 kg)

Career information
- Jrs.: NDG Maple Leafs
- College: Southern Illinois

Career history
- 1970: Montreal Alouettes
- 1970–1971: Ottawa Rough Riders
- 1972: Calgary Stampeders
- 1973–1974: Montreal Alouettes

Barclay Allen (born June 23, 1945) is a Canadian former professional football quarterback and defensive back who played in the Canadian Football League from 1970 to 1974. He played college football for the Southern Illinois Salukis. In 1969, Allen was the Salukis' starting quarterback. He signed with the Montreal Alouettes the following year and later played for the Ottawa Rough Riders and Calgary Stampeders over a total of 49 games. Although his original position was as quarterback, Allen saw little time in that role, throwing only two passes during his CFL career. Instead, he spent most of his time as a defensive halfback, making five interceptions over his career, including a pick six.
