= 1992 Ontario Tankard =

- Host city: Nepean
- Arena: Nepean Sportsplex
- Dates: February 4–9
- Winner: Team Howard
- Curling club: Penetanguishene Curling Club, Penetanguishene, Ontario
- Skip: Russ Howard
- Third: Glenn Howard
- Second: Wayne Middaugh
- Lead: Peter Corner
- Alternate: Larry Merkley
- Finalist: Mike Harris (Tam Heather)

The 1992 Ontario Tankard, (known as the Labatt's Blue Light Tankard for sponsorship reasons) the southern Ontario men's provincial curling championship was held February 4–9 at the Nepean Sportsplex in Nepean, Ontario. The winning rink of Russ Howard, Glenn Howard, Wayne Middaugh and Peter Corner from the Penetanguishene Curling Club would go on to represent Ontario at the 1992 Labatt Brier, Canada's national men's curling championship in Regina, Saskatchewan.

In the final, 1987 World Champion Russ Howard beat Tankard rookie Mike Harris from Scarborough's Tam Heather club, 6–4. Howard scored a deuce in the first, thanks to a mistake on Harris' last rock. Harris couldn't muster a deuce or a steal of his own for the rest of the game, thanks to the strong takeout play by the Howard team. Howard considered a "tremendous draw" in the third to be the turning point in the game, and another deuce in the fifth pretty much put the game away for Howard. Howard won the game when he ran Team Harris out of rocks with a takeout on his final shot. He would end up curling 86 per cent in what was his sixth provincial championship. Howard went into the finals having amassed more than $100,000 on tour that season, and had a record of 51–4 following the tournament.

Harris, who was the youngest skip in the tournament at the age of 24, advanced to the final after beating Mike Altenhof of Chatham 9–6 in the semifinal. The Harris team had a poor record earlier in the season, and nearly did not want to even play in the provincial playdowns.

== Qualification ==
| Qualification method | Berths | Qualifying team(s) | Host |
|---|---|---|---|
| Zones 1–4 | 2 | Bill Walsh; Wayne Tallon | Hylands, Ottawa |
| Zones 5–8 | 2 | Paul Savage; Brad Mitchell | Grey Granite, Owen Sound |
| Zones 9–12 | 2 | Russ Howard; Frank Gowman | Donalda, Don Mills |
| Zones 13–16 | 2 | John Base; Mike Altenhof | Highland, London |
| Challenge Round East | 1 | Mike Harris | Port Perry |
| Challenge Round West | 1 | Bob Edmondson | Orangeville |

== Teams ==
The teams were as follows:

| Skip | Third | Second | Lead | Club |
|---|---|---|---|---|
| Mike Altenhof | Brian ReRooy | Peter DeKoning | Chris Lumbard | Chatham Granite Club, Chatham |
| John Base | Larry Snow | Dean Dart | Ron Scarrow | Oakville Curling Club, Oakville |
| Bob Edmondson | Graham MacEachern | Doug Pole | Pat Osborne | Humber Highlands Curling Club, Toronto |
| Frank Gowman | Rob Moore | Tim Apel | Steve Morrison | Galt Curling Club, Cambridge |
| Mike Harris | Richard Hart | Collin Mitchell | George Karrys | Tam Heather Curling Club, West Hill, Scarborough |
| Russ Howard | Glenn Howard | Wayne Middaugh | Peter Corner | Penetanguishene Curling Club, Penetanguishene |
| Bradley Mitchell | Rob Houston | Dave Downer | Brian Rose | Boulevard Club, Toronto |
| Paul Savage | Graeme McCarrel | Ian Tetley | Todd Tsukamoto | Avonlea Curling Club, Toronto |
| Wayne Tallon | Bruce Delaney | Brian Edge | Kevin Lemenchick | Granite Curling Club, Ottawa |
| Bill Walsh | Dave Van Dine | Dave Collyer | Gord Pringle | Rideau Curling Club, Ottawa |

== Standings ==
Final standings

Key
| Teams to Playoffs |

| Skip (club) | Wins | Losses |
|---|---|---|
| Russ Howard (Penetanguishene) | 8 | 1 |
| Mike Harris (Tam Heather) | 7 | 2 |
| Mike Altenhof (Chatham) | 7 | 2 |
| Bradley Mitchell (Boulevard) | 6 | 3 |
| Wayne Tallon (Granite) | 5 | 4 |
| John Base (Oakville) | 4 | 5 |
| Bill Walsh (Rideau) | 4 | 5 |
| Paul Savage (Avonlea) | 2 | 7 |
| Frank Gowman (Galt) | 1 | 8 |
| Bob Edmondson (Humber Highlands) | 1 | 8 |

== Scores ==
=== Draw 1 ===
February 4, 1:30pm

| Team | 1 | 2 | 3 | 4 | 5 | 6 | 7 | 8 | 9 | 10 | Final |
|---|---|---|---|---|---|---|---|---|---|---|---|
| Russ Howard | 1 | 0 | 0 | 1 | 1 | 0 | 0 | 0 | 2 | X | 5 |
| Mike Altenhof | 0 | 0 | 1 | 0 | 0 | 1 | 0 | 0 | 0 | X | 2 |

| Team | 1 | 2 | 3 | 4 | 5 | 6 | 7 | 8 | 9 | 10 | Final |
|---|---|---|---|---|---|---|---|---|---|---|---|
| Frank Gowman | 0 | 0 | 0 | 0 | 0 | 1 | 0 | 0 | 1 | X | 2 |
| Paul Savage | 1 | 0 | 0 | 1 | 1 | 0 | 0 | 1 | 0 | X | 4 |

| Team | 1 | 2 | 3 | 4 | 5 | 6 | 7 | 8 | 9 | 10 | 11 | Final |
|---|---|---|---|---|---|---|---|---|---|---|---|---|
| Wayne Tallon | 0 | 0 | 1 | 1 | 0 | 3 | 0 | 1 | 0 | 1 | 0 | 7 |
| Mike Harris | 0 | 1 | 0 | 0 | 3 | 0 | 1 | 0 | 2 | 0 | 1 | 8 |

| Team | 1 | 2 | 3 | 4 | 5 | 6 | 7 | 8 | 9 | 10 | Final |
|---|---|---|---|---|---|---|---|---|---|---|---|
| Bob Edmondson | 0 | 0 | 0 | 1 | 0 | 1 | 0 | 1 | 0 | 0 | 3 |
| John Base | 0 | 1 | 0 | 0 | 1 | 0 | 0 | 0 | 0 | 1 | 4 |

| Team | 1 | 2 | 3 | 4 | 5 | 6 | 7 | 8 | 9 | 10 | Final |
|---|---|---|---|---|---|---|---|---|---|---|---|
| Bradley Mitchell | 0 | 0 | 1 | 0 | 0 | 0 | X | X | X | X | 1 |
| Bill Walsh | 0 | 1 | 0 | 3 | 3 | 2 | X | X | X | X | 9 |

=== Draw 2 ===
February 4, 7:00pm

| Team | 1 | 2 | 3 | 4 | 5 | 6 | 7 | 8 | 9 | 10 | Final |
|---|---|---|---|---|---|---|---|---|---|---|---|
| Frank Gowman | 0 | 0 | 0 | 0 | 2 | 0 | 1 | 0 | 1 | X | 4 |
| Bradley Mitchell | 0 | 1 | 1 | 1 | 0 | 3 | 0 | 1 | 0 | X | 7 |

| Team | 1 | 2 | 3 | 4 | 5 | 6 | 7 | 8 | 9 | 10 | Final |
|---|---|---|---|---|---|---|---|---|---|---|---|
| Mike Altenhof | 0 | 0 | 0 | 1 | 0 | 0 | 1 | 0 | 0 | X | 2 |
| Mike Harris | 0 | 1 | 1 | 0 | 2 | 1 | 0 | 0 | 1 | X | 6 |

| Team | 1 | 2 | 3 | 4 | 5 | 6 | 7 | 8 | 9 | 10 | Final |
|---|---|---|---|---|---|---|---|---|---|---|---|
| Russ Howard | 0 | 1 | 0 | 2 | 0 | 1 | 0 | 0 | 1 | 2 | 7 |
| John Base | 0 | 0 | 2 | 0 | 1 | 0 | 1 | 1 | 0 | 0 | 5 |

| Team | 1 | 2 | 3 | 4 | 5 | 6 | 7 | 8 | 9 | 10 | Final |
|---|---|---|---|---|---|---|---|---|---|---|---|
| Paul Savage | 0 | 0 | 2 | 0 | 1 | 0 | 1 | 0 | 2 | 0 | 6 |
| Bill Walsh | 1 | 2 | 0 | 1 | 0 | 2 | 0 | 1 | 0 | 1 | 8 |

| Team | 1 | 2 | 3 | 4 | 5 | 6 | 7 | 8 | 9 | 10 | Final |
|---|---|---|---|---|---|---|---|---|---|---|---|
| Wayne Tallon | 0 | 0 | 0 | 1 | 0 | 1 | 0 | 2 | 0 | 1 | 5 |
| Bob Edmondson | 0 | 0 | 1 | 0 | 1 | 0 | 1 | 0 | 0 | 0 | 3 |

=== Draw 3 ===
February 5, 1:30pm

| Team | 1 | 2 | 3 | 4 | 5 | 6 | 7 | 8 | 9 | 10 | Final |
|---|---|---|---|---|---|---|---|---|---|---|---|
| Wayne Tallon | 0 | 0 | 2 | 0 | 1 | 0 | 2 | 0 | 0 | 1 | 6 |
| Paul Savage | 0 | 1 | 0 | 1 | 0 | 2 | 0 | 0 | 1 | 0 | 5 |

| Team | 1 | 2 | 3 | 4 | 5 | 6 | 7 | 8 | 9 | 10 | Final |
|---|---|---|---|---|---|---|---|---|---|---|---|
| John Base | 0 | 0 | 3 | 0 | 2 | 0 | 3 | 0 | 1 | X | 9 |
| Bill Walsh | 1 | 1 | 0 | 1 | 0 | 0 | 0 | 1 | 0 | X | 4 |

| Team | 1 | 2 | 3 | 4 | 5 | 6 | 7 | 8 | 9 | 10 | Final |
|---|---|---|---|---|---|---|---|---|---|---|---|
| Bob Edmondson | 1 | 0 | 0 | 1 | 0 | 1 | 0 | 0 | 0 | X | 3 |
| Mike Altenhof | 0 | 3 | 1 | 0 | 1 | 0 | 0 | 1 | 0 | X | 6 |

| Team | 1 | 2 | 3 | 4 | 5 | 6 | 7 | 8 | 9 | 10 | Final |
|---|---|---|---|---|---|---|---|---|---|---|---|
| Bradley Mitchell | 1 | 0 | 0 | 2 | 1 | 1 | 0 | 0 | 0 | 1 | 6 |
| Mike Harris | 0 | 0 | 1 | 0 | 0 | 0 | 0 | 2 | 1 | 0 | 4 |

| Team | 1 | 2 | 3 | 4 | 5 | 6 | 7 | 8 | 9 | 10 | Final |
|---|---|---|---|---|---|---|---|---|---|---|---|
| Frank Gowman | 0 | 0 | 1 | 0 | 0 | 1 | 0 | 1 | 0 | 0 | 3 |
| Russ Howard | 0 | 2 | 0 | 2 | 0 | 0 | 0 | 0 | 0 | 0 | 4 |

=== Draw 4 ===
February 5, 7:00pm

| Team | 1 | 2 | 3 | 4 | 5 | 6 | 7 | 8 | 9 | 10 | Final |
|---|---|---|---|---|---|---|---|---|---|---|---|
| Mike Altenhof | 0 | 2 | 0 | 0 | 2 | 0 | 1 | 1 | 0 | 1 | 7 |
| John Base | 1 | 0 | 1 | 0 | 0 | 2 | 0 | 0 | 2 | 0 | 6 |

| Team | 1 | 2 | 3 | 4 | 5 | 6 | 7 | 8 | 9 | 10 | Final |
|---|---|---|---|---|---|---|---|---|---|---|---|
| Wayne Tallon | 0 | 0 | 1 | 0 | 0 | 3 | 2 | 1 | X | X | 7 |
| Frank Gowman | 1 | 0 | 0 | 0 | 2 | 0 | 0 | 0 | X | X | 3 |

| Team | 1 | 2 | 3 | 4 | 5 | 6 | 7 | 8 | 9 | 10 | Final |
|---|---|---|---|---|---|---|---|---|---|---|---|
| Paul Savage | 0 | 0 | 1 | 1 | 0 | 1 | 0 | 0 | 0 | X | 3 |
| Bradley Mitchell | 1 | 1 | 0 | 0 | 1 | 0 | 0 | 1 | 2 | X | 6 |

| Team | 1 | 2 | 3 | 4 | 5 | 6 | 7 | 8 | 9 | 10 | Final |
|---|---|---|---|---|---|---|---|---|---|---|---|
| Russ Howard | 0 | 3 | 0 | 2 | 0 | 2 | 0 | 0 | 3 | X | 10 |
| Bob Edmondson | 2 | 0 | 1 | 0 | 1 | 0 | 0 | 2 | 0 | X | 6 |

| Team | 1 | 2 | 3 | 4 | 5 | 6 | 7 | 8 | 9 | 10 | Final |
|---|---|---|---|---|---|---|---|---|---|---|---|
| Bill Walsh | 0 | 1 | 0 | 1 | 1 | 1 | 0 | 2 | 0 | 0 | 6 |
| Mike Harris | 1 | 0 | 1 | 0 | 0 | 0 | 1 | 0 | 3 | 2 | 8 |

=== Draw 5 ===
February 6, 1:30pm

| Team | 1 | 2 | 3 | 4 | 5 | 6 | 7 | 8 | 9 | 10 | Final |
|---|---|---|---|---|---|---|---|---|---|---|---|
| Mike Harris | 0 | 0 | 2 | 0 | 1 | 0 | 2 | 0 | 0 | X | 5 |
| Russ Howard | 0 | 2 | 0 | 1 | 0 | 4 | 0 | 0 | 1 | X | 8 |

| Team | 1 | 2 | 3 | 4 | 5 | 6 | 7 | 8 | 9 | 10 | Final |
|---|---|---|---|---|---|---|---|---|---|---|---|
| Bob Edmondson | 0 | 0 | 1 | 0 | 2 | 0 | 0 | 2 | 0 | X | 5 |
| Bradley Mitchell | 0 | 2 | 0 | 1 | 0 | 2 | 4 | 0 | 1 | X | 10 |

| Team | 1 | 2 | 3 | 4 | 5 | 6 | 7 | 8 | 9 | 10 | Final |
|---|---|---|---|---|---|---|---|---|---|---|---|
| Frank Gowman | 0 | 0 | 2 | 0 | 1 | 0 | 0 | 1 | 0 | X | 4 |
| Bill Walsh | 0 | 3 | 0 | 1 | 0 | 2 | 1 | 0 | 2 | X | 9 |

| Team | 1 | 2 | 3 | 4 | 5 | 6 | 7 | 8 | 9 | 10 | Final |
|---|---|---|---|---|---|---|---|---|---|---|---|
| Mike Altenhof | 0 | 0 | 1 | 0 | 2 | 0 | 2 | 0 | 1 | X | 6 |
| Paul Savage | 0 | 0 | 0 | 1 | 0 | 1 | 0 | 1 | 0 | X | 3 |

| Team | 1 | 2 | 3 | 4 | 5 | 6 | 7 | 8 | 9 | 10 | Final |
|---|---|---|---|---|---|---|---|---|---|---|---|
| John Base | 0 | 0 | 2 | 0 | 0 | 0 | 1 | 0 | 0 | X | 3 |
| Wayne Tallon | 1 | 0 | 0 | 1 | 0 | 0 | 0 | 2 | 1 | X | 5 |

=== Draw 6 ===
February 6, 7:30pm

| Team | 1 | 2 | 3 | 4 | 5 | 6 | 7 | 8 | 9 | 10 | Final |
|---|---|---|---|---|---|---|---|---|---|---|---|
| Bob Edmondson | 0 | 0 | 1 | 0 | 2 | 0 | 1 | 0 | 0 | X | 4 |
| Bill Walsh | 0 | 2 | 0 | 1 | 0 | 1 | 0 | 3 | 0 | X | 7 |

| Team | 1 | 2 | 3 | 4 | 5 | 6 | 7 | 8 | 9 | 10 | Final |
|---|---|---|---|---|---|---|---|---|---|---|---|
| Russ Howard | 0 | 2 | 0 | 2 | 2 | 0 | 0 | 2 | 0 | X | 8 |
| Wayne Tallon | 1 | 0 | 2 | 0 | 0 | 1 | 1 | 0 | 0 | X | 5 |

| Team | 1 | 2 | 3 | 4 | 5 | 6 | 7 | 8 | 9 | 10 | Final |
|---|---|---|---|---|---|---|---|---|---|---|---|
| John Base | 0 | 1 | 1 | 0 | 1 | 1 | 0 | 1 | 0 | 0 | 5 |
| Paul Savage | 1 | 0 | 0 | 2 | 0 | 0 | 2 | 0 | 0 | 1 | 6 |

| Team | 1 | 2 | 3 | 4 | 5 | 6 | 7 | 8 | 9 | 10 | Final |
|---|---|---|---|---|---|---|---|---|---|---|---|
| Mike Harris | 2 | 0 | 0 | 2 | 2 | 0 | 1 | 0 | 2 | X | 9 |
| Frank Gowman | 0 | 1 | 1 | 0 | 0 | 2 | 0 | 1 | 0 | X | 5 |

| Team | 1 | 2 | 3 | 4 | 5 | 6 | 7 | 8 | 9 | 10 | Final |
|---|---|---|---|---|---|---|---|---|---|---|---|
| Bradley Mitchell | 0 | 1 | 0 | 3 | 0 | 1 | 0 | 0 | X | X | 5 |
| Mike Altenhof | 4 | 0 | 3 | 0 | 1 | 0 | 1 | 1 | X | X | 10 |

=== Draw 7 ===
February 7, 2:00pm

| Team | 1 | 2 | 3 | 4 | 5 | 6 | 7 | 8 | 9 | 10 | Final |
|---|---|---|---|---|---|---|---|---|---|---|---|
| John Base | 1 | 0 | 0 | 1 | 0 | 1 | 0 | 3 | 1 | X | 7 |
| Frank Gowman | 0 | 0 | 1 | 0 | 1 | 0 | 1 | 0 | 0 | X | 3 |

| Team | 1 | 2 | 3 | 4 | 5 | 6 | 7 | 8 | 9 | 10 | Final |
|---|---|---|---|---|---|---|---|---|---|---|---|
| Bill Walsh | 0 | 0 | 0 | 0 | 3 | 0 | 1 | 0 | X | X | 4 |
| Mike Altenhof | 1 | 0 | 2 | 2 | 0 | 1 | 0 | 3 | X | X | 9 |

| Team | 1 | 2 | 3 | 4 | 5 | 6 | 7 | 8 | 9 | 10 | 11 | Final |
|---|---|---|---|---|---|---|---|---|---|---|---|---|
| Mike Harris | 0 | 0 | 1 | 0 | 0 | 1 | 1 | 1 | 0 | 0 | 3 | 7 |
| Bob Edmondson | 1 | 0 | 0 | 0 | 2 | 0 | 0 | 0 | 0 | 1 | 0 | 4 |

| Team | 1 | 2 | 3 | 4 | 5 | 6 | 7 | 8 | 9 | 10 | Final |
|---|---|---|---|---|---|---|---|---|---|---|---|
| Wayne Tallon | 0 | 0 | 1 | 0 | 0 | 1 | 1 | 0 | 0 | 2 | 5 |
| Bradley Mitchell | 0 | 1 | 0 | 1 | 1 | 0 | 0 | 2 | 1 | 0 | 6 |

| Team | 1 | 2 | 3 | 4 | 5 | 6 | 7 | 8 | 9 | 10 | Final |
|---|---|---|---|---|---|---|---|---|---|---|---|
| Russ Howard | 0 | 1 | 1 | 0 | 0 | 1 | 1 | 0 | 4 | X | 8 |
| Paul Savage | 1 | 0 | 0 | 2 | 0 | 0 | 0 | 1 | 0 | X | 4 |

=== Draw 8 ===
February 7, 7:00pm

| Team | 1 | 2 | 3 | 4 | 5 | 6 | 7 | 8 | 9 | 10 | Final |
|---|---|---|---|---|---|---|---|---|---|---|---|
| Paul Savage | 0 | 0 | 1 | 0 | 2 | 0 | 0 | 1 | 0 | 0 | 4 |
| Mike Harris | 0 | 1 | 0 | 1 | 0 | 1 | 1 | 0 | 0 | 1 | 5 |

| Team | 1 | 2 | 3 | 4 | 5 | 6 | 7 | 8 | 9 | 10 | Final |
|---|---|---|---|---|---|---|---|---|---|---|---|
| Bradley Mitchell | 0 | 0 | 1 | 1 | 0 | 0 | 0 | 1 | 0 | X | 3 |
| John Base | 3 | 1 | 0 | 0 | 0 | 0 | 1 | 0 | 1 | X | 6 |

| Team | 1 | 2 | 3 | 4 | 5 | 6 | 7 | 8 | 9 | 10 | Final |
|---|---|---|---|---|---|---|---|---|---|---|---|
| Mike Altenhof | 0 | 2 | 0 | 0 | 0 | 0 | 2 | 0 | 1 | 1 | 6 |
| Wayne Tallon | 0 | 0 | 2 | 0 | 0 | 2 | 0 | 0 | 0 | 0 | 4 |

| Team | 1 | 2 | 3 | 4 | 5 | 6 | 7 | 8 | 9 | 10 | Final |
|---|---|---|---|---|---|---|---|---|---|---|---|
| Bill Walsh | 0 | 0 | 0 | 0 | 0 | 0 | X | X | X | X | 0 |
| Russ Howard | 2 | 1 | 3 | 0 | 0 | 2 | X | X | X | X | 8 |

| Team | 1 | 2 | 3 | 4 | 5 | 6 | 7 | 8 | 9 | 10 | Final |
|---|---|---|---|---|---|---|---|---|---|---|---|
| Bob Edmondson | 0 | 1 | 1 | 0 | 1 | 0 | 0 | 1 | 0 | X | 4 |
| Frank Gowman | 2 | 0 | 0 | 1 | 0 | 1 | 1 | 0 | 1 | X | 6 |

=== Draw 9 ===
February 8, 9:00am

| Team | 1 | 2 | 3 | 4 | 5 | 6 | 7 | 8 | 9 | 10 | Final |
|---|---|---|---|---|---|---|---|---|---|---|---|
| Bill Walsh | 0 | 1 | 0 | 2 | 0 | 0 | 1 | 0 | X | X | 4 |
| Wayne Tallon | 2 | 0 | 1 | 0 | 2 | 1 | 0 | 3 | X | X | 9 |

| Team | 1 | 2 | 3 | 4 | 5 | 6 | 7 | 8 | 9 | 10 | Final |
|---|---|---|---|---|---|---|---|---|---|---|---|
| Paul Savage | 0 | 0 | 1 | 0 | 1 | 0 | X | X | X | X | 3 |
| Bob Edmondson | 1 | 1 | 0 | 1 | 0 | 4 | X | X | X | X | 7 |

| Team | 1 | 2 | 3 | 4 | 5 | 6 | 7 | 8 | 9 | 10 | Final |
|---|---|---|---|---|---|---|---|---|---|---|---|
| Bradley Mitchell | 2 | 0 | 1 | 1 | 0 | 2 | 0 | 2 | 0 | 1 | 9 |
| Russ Howard | 0 | 1 | 0 | 0 | 2 | 0 | 1 | 0 | 2 | 0 | 6 |

| Team | 1 | 2 | 3 | 4 | 5 | 6 | 7 | 8 | 9 | 10 | Final |
|---|---|---|---|---|---|---|---|---|---|---|---|
| Frank Gowman | 0 | 1 | 0 | 0 | 2 | 0 | 0 | 0 | 1 | X | 4 |
| Mike Altenhof | 0 | 0 | 1 | 1 | 0 | 1 | 2 | 1 | 0 | X | 6 |

| Team | 1 | 2 | 3 | 4 | 5 | 6 | 7 | 8 | 9 | 10 | 11 | Final |
|---|---|---|---|---|---|---|---|---|---|---|---|---|
| Mike Harris | 0 | 0 | 1 | 1 | 0 | 1 | 1 | 0 | 0 | 0 | 1 | 5 |
| John Base | 2 | 0 | 0 | 0 | 1 | 0 | 0 | 0 | 1 | 0 | 0 | 4 |

== Playoffs ==
| Semifinal | | | Final |
| | | | 1 | Russ Howard | 6 |
| 2 | Mike Harris | 9 | 3 | Mike Harris | 4 |
| 3 | Mike Altenhof | 6 |

=== Semifinal ===
February 8, 7:00pm

| Team | 1 | 2 | 3 | 4 | 5 | 6 | 7 | 8 | 9 | 10 | Final |
|---|---|---|---|---|---|---|---|---|---|---|---|
| Mike Altenhof | 0 | 0 | 1 | 0 | 0 | 3 | 0 | 2 | 0 | X | 6 |
| Mike Harris | 2 | 1 | 0 | 0 | 2 | 0 | 2 | 0 | 2 | X | 9 |

=== Final ===
February 9, 2:00pm

| Team | 1 | 2 | 3 | 4 | 5 | 6 | 7 | 8 | 9 | 10 | Final |
|---|---|---|---|---|---|---|---|---|---|---|---|
| Mike Harris | 0 | 1 | 0 | 1 | 0 | 1 | 0 | 0 | 1 | X | 4 |
| Russ Howard 🔨 | 2 | 0 | 1 | 0 | 2 | 0 | 0 | 1 | 0 | X | 6 |

== Zone winners ==
Zone winners qualified for the regional playdowns, with the regional winners advancing to provincials.

| Zone | Skip | Club |
|---|---|---|
| A1 | Bill Walsh | Rideau |
| 1B | Tony Large | Ottawa |
| 2A | Mert Thompsett | City View |
| 2B | Wayne Tallon | Granite |
| 3A | John McCoppen | Kingston |
| 3B | Alex Tosh | Kingston |
| 4A | Steve Newhouse | Lindsay |
| 4B | Bill Harrison | Bobcaygeon |
| 5A | Barry Acton | Uxbridge |
| 5B | Ron Allison | Whitby |
| 6A | Paul Savage | Avonlea |
| 6B | Ed Werenich | Avonlea |
| 7A | Brad Mitchell | Boulevard |
| 7B | Jeff McCrady | Royals |
| 8A | Bob Edmondson | Humber Highland |
| 8B | Jim Sharples | Lambton |
| 9A | Ron Spence | Brampton |
| 9B | Peter Eller | Shelburne |
| 10A | Russ Howard | Penetanguishene |
| 10B | Tim Belcourt | Midland |
| 11A | Al Hutchinson | Bluewater |
| 11B | Jerry Burrows | Southampton |
| 12A | Axel Larson | Guelph |
| 12B | Frank Gowman | Galt |
| 13A | Mike Root | St. Catharines |
| 13B | John Base | Oakville |
| 14A | Bruce Park | Brant |
| 14B | Bob McKinnon | Norwich |
| 15A | Kirk Ziola | Highland |
| 15B | Bruce Munro | Kilworth |
| 16A | Bob Ingram | Ridgetown |
| 16B | Mike Altenhof | Chatham |
