= Quebec Senior Football League =

Quebec Senior Football League operated in the 1950s and 1960s and ceased operations after the 1966 season. It was a league for players that were both junior and a bit older than juniors, and included the Verdun Shamcats and the Chateauguay Ramblers. It was followed by the strictly junior Quebec Juvenile Football League.
