= Bob Geary (Canadian football) =

Canadian football player (1933–2001)

Profile
- Position: Offensive lineman

Personal information
- Born: October 6, 1933; Montreal, Quebec, Canada
- Died: February 17, 2001 (aged 67)
- Listed height: 5 ft 9 in (1.75 m)
- Listed weight: 215 lb (98 kg)

Career information
- College: none - Verdun Shamcats

Career history

Playing
- 1955–57: Calgary Stampeders
- 1958–60: Montreal Alouettes
- 1961: Verdun Shamcats
- 1962–63: Montreal Alouettes
- 1964: Quebec Rifles

Coaching
- 1969–82: Montreal Alouettes

Robert Patrick Geary (October 6, 1933 – February 17, 2001) was a player and general manager of the Montreal Alouettes of the Canadian Football League (CFL).

After playing for the Verdun Shamcats in the Quebec Senior Football League, Geary began his professional career with the CFL Calgary Stampeders in 1955.

Geary moved to the Alouettes for the 1958 season and blocked for Canadian Football Hall of Fame running back George Dixon. He finished his career with the Quebec Rifles of the United Football League.

He remained with the Alouettes organization after his playing days ended in 1964, serving as an assistant coach and later assistant to General Managers J.I. Albrecht and Marv Levy. In 1975 he became General Manager, staying in that position until 1981, when in 1982 he became the Director of Football Operations for the newly christened Concordes (he was replaced in the GM position of the new club by Joe Galat). Geary helped put together the 1974 and 1977 Grey Cup winning teams.

Geary died on February 17, 2001. He was 67.
