= Ottawa Junior Riders =

Junior Canadian football team

Logo

General information
- Founded: 1995 (as Gloucester Redskins)
- Stadium: Nepean Sportsplex
- Headquartered: Ottawa, Ontario
- Colours: Red, Black, and White
- Website: www.ottawajrriders.ca

Personnel
- Head coach: Rob Bento

League / conference affiliations
- Canadian Junior Football League (2001–2005); Quebec Junior Football League (1995–2000, 2006–2013, 2017–present); Ontario Football Conference

Championships
- League championships: 0; 1998, 1999, 2000, 2006, 2007, 2008, 2010, 2018, 2019

The Ottawa Junior Riders are a Canadian football team based in the Nepean area of Ottawa that plays in the Quebec Junior Football League. The Junior Riders play at the Nepean Sportsplex, but have previously called Frank Clair Stadium at Lansdowne Park their home.

== History ==
The team began operations in 1995 as the Gloucester Redskins, and operated as such until the conclusion of the 1996 QJFL season. With the folding of the CFL's Ottawa Rough Riders, the Gloucester Redskins changed their name to the current Ottawa Junior Riders and changed their colors from burgundy, yellow and white, to the current red, black and white. The organization began competing in the Quebec Junior Football League in 1995, and did so until the end of the 2000 season. In 2001, the Ottawa Junior Riders began play in the Ontario Football Conference of the Canadian Junior Football League. The Ottawa Junior Riders played in the CJFL until the end of the 2005 season, when they returned to the QJFL for the beginning of the 2006 season. Although the team did not garner much success in the OFC/CJFL, they have won nine QJFL Championships over their time in that league (1998, 1999, 2000, 2006, 2007, 2008, 2010, 2018, 2019). Upon their entry into the QJFL, the Junior Riders had developed a rivalry with the Ottawa Sooners, but the Sooners moved to the CJFL in 2009. The Junior Riders again left the QJFL after the 2013 season, but returned to the league for the 2017 season.

== Coaches ==
Dean Dorsey 1995–1998

Dan Murphy 1999–2002

Andy McEvoy 2003

Luigi Costanzo 2004–2009

Max Palladino 2010–2017

Rob Bento 2018–present

== Notable former players ==
Scott Gordon, a Defensive Back for the Edmonton Eskimos.

Pat Fleming, played Punter for the Ottawa Renegades, Hamilton Tiger-Cats and Winnipeg Blue Bombers.

Lenard Semajuste played Fullback for the Winnipeg Blue Bombers.

Ettore Lattanzio, played on the Defensive Line for the Ottawa Redblacks

== Hall of Fame ==
The following is a list of Players, Coaches and Builders who have been inducted into the Ottawa Junior Riders Hall of Fame.

Bob Brazeau - Equipment Manager - Builder

Sue Brazeau - General Manager - Builder

Dave St-Pierre - Statistician - Builder

Teresa Gilchrist - General Manager - Builder

Karen Cameron - Trainer - Builder

Dean Dorsey - Head Coach - Coach

Dan Murphy - Head Coach - Coach

Eddie Ghantous - RB - Player

Scott Gordon - DB - Player

Steve Kasouf - LB - Player

Tucker McCabe - QB - Player

Devin Murphy - DB - Player

Richard Tremblay - WR - Player

Curtis McCausland - OL - Player

Casey Bergeron - OL - Player

Aaron Snow - OL - Player

Dexter Ross - DL - Player

Joe Costanzo - RB - Player

Brandon Mahon - OL/LB - Player

Defensive tackle Nicholas Rouleau

== Sources ==
- https://web.archive.org/web/20081018230316/http://www.jrriders.highfivesports.ca/
- http://capitalregionfootball.info/index.php?pr=Junior_-_Jr_Riders
- https://web.archive.org/web/20080109042838/http://www.emmediateweb.com/jrriders/jrhistory.asp
