= Rick Sowieta =

Canadian football player (1954–2017)

No. 73
- Position: Linebacker

Personal information
- Born: 10 March 1954; Heusden, Belgium
- Died: 26 August 2017 (aged 63); Ottawa, Ontario, Canada

Career information
- College: University of Richmond

Career history
- 1977–1978: Toronto Argonauts
- 1979–1986: Ottawa Rough Riders

Awards and highlights
- 3× CFL East All-Star (1980, 83, 85)

Rick Sowieta (10 March 1954 – 26 August 2017) was a CFL linebacker who played ten seasons in the Canadian Football League, mainly for the Ottawa Rough Riders, for whom he played eight years. He was a CFL Eastern All Star in 1980, 1983, and 1985.

== Early life ==
Born in Heusden, Belgium, Sowieta's parents and family emigrated to Canada in 1957, and he grew up in Ottawa, Ontario, where he attended Glebe Collegiate for high school. While at the school, he played linebacker for the football team, who were City Jr. Junior Football Champs in 1969. He later played in the Canadian Junior Football League for the local Ottawa Sooners and, in 1971, they were the Eastern Canadian Finalists.

== University ==
Sowieta attended the University of Richmond in Virginia, where he earned a BA in Economics and graduated in 1977. While attending, he played linebacker for the Richmond Spiders, a Division 1 football team in the NCAA, which won Southern Conference Championship for the NCAA in 1975.

== Careers ==
=== Professional football career ===
Sowieta began his professional football career in 1977 when he was a first-round draft pick for the Toronto Argonauts CFL team, for whom he played two seasons, from 1977 to 1979. In 1979, he was traded to the Ottawa Rough Riders CFL team, for whom he played from 1979 to 1986. During his time with the Rough Riders he won three Eastern All-Star Selections (1980, 1983, 1985), was nominated as Ottawa's Choice for Outstanding Canadian Citizen in 1980, and played in the 69th Grey Cup game in 1981. During his ten-year career he played 157 games, ten of which were playoff games and one of which was a Grey Cup game.

=== Football coaching career ===
Following the end of his career in the CFL, he coached on and off with various national, Junior League, University, and High School football teams. In both 1989 and 1990 he coached the Semi-Professional Ottawa Bootleggers to championship finals. In 1991, he coached the Ottawa Sooners to the Canadian Bowl finals. In 2001, he coached the St. Mark's, an Ottawa high school, to the city championship finals. In 2002, the University of Ottawa Gee-Gees football team was coached by Sowieta and they were finalists in the 2002 Yates Cup. In both 2008 and 2009, the St. Pat's high school football teams were coached to victory at the Tier 2 city championships.

=== Football management positions ===
Sowieta served as the President of both the Ottawa Rough Riders Alumni Association and of the Ottawa Sooners Football Club. He also served as a member of the Canadian Football Hall of Fame selection committee, of the International Federation of American Football, and as the High Performance Director Junior National Team (U20) in 2009. Sowieta was the General Manager of Canada's Team World (U20) for 2010.

=== Careers outside of football ===
In addition to playing for Rough Riders in the 80's, Sowieta worked for Bacardi Rum as the sales manager for Eastern Ontario from 1980-89. From 1989-2003 he was the co-owner of various Mexican-themed restaurants, namely Las Palmas, Rick's Cantina, and the Salsa Shack. From 2003-2005 Sowieta was an instructor at the Nowy Sacz University Business School in Poland, primarily teaching English as a second language.

Sowieta died of cancer in 2017 at the age of 63.
