= Mark Seale =

Canadian gridiron football player (born 1960)

Profile
- Position: Defensive tackle

Personal information
- Born: March 10, 1960 (age 66); Halifax, Nova Scotia, Canada

Career information
- High school: Sir Wilfrid Laurier Secondary School (Ottawa)
- CJFL: Ottawa Sooners
- College: University of Richmond
- NFL draft: 1982: 12th round, 323rd overall pick
- CFL draft: 1982

Career history
- 1982–1984: Ottawa Rough Riders
- 1985–1986: Toronto Argonauts
- 1987–1988: Winnipeg Blue Bombers

Donald "Mark" Seale (born March 10, 1960) is a Canadian former professional football defensive lineman who played seven seasons in the Canadian Football League (CFL) for three teams.

Seale was selected as a territorial exemption by the Ottawa Rough Riders in the 1982 CFL draft. He was also the 12th round selection of the New York Giants in the 1982 NFL draft.

Seale attended Sir Wilfrid Laurier Secondary School in Ottawa, Ontario, where he lettered in both hockey and football. He also played for the Ottawa Sooners for two seasons before attending the University of Richmond in Virginia, where he earned a Bachelor of Arts degree in 1982.
