= Quebec Junior Football League =

Canadian football competition

The Quebec Major Junior Football League (QMJFL; French: Ligue de football junior majeur du Québec) is a junior Canadian football competition held in Quebec, Canada, since 1970, as a successor to the Quebec Juvenile Football League. It began competition as a conference of the Canadian Junior Football League (CJFL), from which it eventually withdrew. Upon withdrawal from the CJFL, the QJFL incorporated teams from the Ottawa region in Ontario and created the league as it stands today. In one form or another, the QJFL can trace its roots back to 1908. Annually the league awards the regular season champions the Cyril T. White Trophy, and the playoff champions the Joe Pistilli Cup, formerly known as the Manson Cup.

== Teams ==
Map of teams
- ARFLL Wildcats
- Les Loups du Nord
- North Shore Broncos
- South Shore Junior Packers

== Trophies ==
- Joe Pistilli Cup: Playoff Champions
  - known as Manson Cup from 1988 to 2010
- Cyril T. White Trophy: Regular Season Champions
- Bob Geary Trophy: Player of the Year
- Sport O'Keefe Trophy: Most Valuable Player to his Team
- Kelvin Kirk Trophy: Offensive Player of the Year
- Schenley Trophy: Defensive Player of the Year
- Trevor Bennett Trophy: Offensive Lineman of the Year
- Alex Chapman Trophy: Rookie of the Year

== Joe Pistilli Cup Champions ==
- 1988: Châteauguay Junior Raiders
- 1989: North Shore Broncos
- 1990: St-Hubert Rebelles
- 1991: St-Hubert Rebelles
- 1992: West Island Broncos
- 1993: West Island Broncos
- 1994: St-Leonard Cougars
- 1995: Pierrefonds Broncos
- 1996: South Shore Packers (14-12 over Ottawa Sooners)
- 1997: Ottawa Sooners (13-7 over Ottawa Junior Riders)
- 1998: Ottawa Junior Riders
- 1999: Ottawa Junior Riders
- 2000: Ottawa Junior Riders
- 2001: Ottawa Sooners (18-17 over Ottawa Junior Riders)
- 2002: Ottawa Sooners
- 2003: Châteauguay Junior Raiders (22-13 over Ottawa Sooners)
- 2004: Châteauguay Junior Raiders (36-34 over Ottawa Sooners)
- 2005: Châteauguay Junior Raiders (18-16 over Ottawa Sooners)
- 2006: Ottawa Junior Riders (19-2 over Châteauguay Junior Raiders)
- 2007: Ottawa Junior Riders (29-27 over Ottawa Sooners)
- 2008: Ottawa Junior Riders (63-16 over Châteauguay Junior Raiders)
- 2009: Châteauguay Junior Raiders (20-19 over Ottawa Junior Riders)
- 2010: Ottawa Junior Riders (10-0 over Châteauguay Junior Raiders)
- 2011: North Shore Sabercats (37-24 over Châteauguay Junior Raiders)
- 2012: North Shore Sabercats (52-34 over Ottawa Junior Riders)
- 2013: North Shore Sabercats (30-23 over South Shore Junior Bruizers)
- 2014: North Shore Sabercats (16-14 over ETS Genie)
- 2015: Châteauguay Junior Raiders (29-9 over South Shore Junior Bruizers)
- 2016: South Shore Junior Bruizers (17-16 over Montreal Royals)
- 2017: Châteauguay Junior Raiders (33-29 over South Shore Junior Bruizers)
- 2018: Ottawa Junior Riders (30-13 over North Shore Sabercats)
- 2019: Ottawa Junior Riders (17-7 over Châteauguay Junior Raiders)
- 2020: Season cancelled due to COVID-19 pandemic
- 2021: Season cancelled due to COVID-19 pandemic
- 2022: South Shore Junior Packers (37–15 over Ottawa Junior Raiders)
- 2023: South Shore Junior Packers (43–0 over Châteauguay Junior Raiders)
- 2024: South Shore Junior Packers (42–34 over North Shore Broncos)
- 2025: ARFLL Wildcats (16-9 over South Shore Junior Packers)

== Cyril T. White Trophy ==
- 1989: St-Leonard Cougars
- 1990: St-Hubert Rebelles
- 1991: St-Hubert Rebelles
- 1992: West Island Broncos
- 1993: West Island Broncos
- 1994: St-Leonard Cougars
- 1995: South Shore Packers
- 1996: South Shore Packers
- 1997: Ottawa Sooners
- 1998: Chateauguay Raiders
- 1999: Ottawa Junior Riders
- 2000: Ottawa Junior Riders
- 2001: Ottawa Sooners
- 2002: Ottawa Sooners
- 2003: Ottawa Sooners
- 2004: Ottawa Sooners
- 2005: Chateauguay Junior Raiders
- 2006: Ottawa Junior Riders
- 2007: Ottawa Junior Riders
- 2008: Ottawa Sooners
- 2009: Ottawa Junior Riders
- 2010: Ottawa Junior Riders
- 2011: Ottawa Junior Riders
- 2012: North Shore Sabercats
- 2013: South Shore Junior Bruizers
- 2014: North Shore Sabercats
- 2015: Chateauguay Junior Raiders
- 2016: South Shore Junior Bruizers
- 2017: South Shore Junior Bruizers
- 2018: South Shore Junior Bruizers
- 2019: Laval Junior Bulldogs
- 2020: Season cancelled due to COVID-19 pandemic
- 2021: Season cancelled due to COVID-19 pandemic
- 2022: Ottawa Junior Riders
- 2023: South Shore Junior Packers
- 2024: South Shore Junior Packers
- 2025: South Shore Junior Packers

== Past Junior teams in Quebec Leagues ==
- Chateauguay Ramblers
- Cornwall Emards
- Cumberland Panthers
- ETS Genie
- Joliette Pirates
- Laval Devils
- Laval Scorpions
- Montreal Royals
- Montreal Junior Alouettes
- Montreal Junior Concordes
- North Shore Broncos
- Notre-Dame-de-Grace Maple Leafs
- Ottawa Junior Riders
- Ottawa Sooners
- Québec Citadelles
- Rosemont Bombers
- Sherbrooke Blitz
- St-Hubert Rebelles
- St-Lazare Stallions
- St-Leonard Cougars
- South Shore Cobras
- South Shore Monarx
- South Shore Packers
- Valleyfield Phalanges
- Verdun Invictus
- Verdun Maple Leafs
- Verdun Shamcats
- Ville Emard Juveniles
- Sun Youth SunDevils

== See also ==
- Canadian football
- Football Canada
- Canadian Football League
- U Sports football
- Canadian Interuniversity Sport
- Canadian Colleges Athletic Association
- Comparison of Canadian and American football
