= Quebec Juvenile Football League =

The Quebec Juvenile Football League operated from 1959 to 1979 as a stepping stone between midget and junior football, and was later merged with the Quebec Junior Football League. The age group consisted primarily of 17- to 19-year-olds, although there were players as young as 15, (e.g. Don Dixon, Lachine Lakers) playing.

The league originally started in the Southwest area of Montreal Island, with Harold "Shorty" Fairhead putting together 4 teams- the Lachine Lakers (coached by Sid Harbert), Petite-Claire Avengers, Dorval Dukes, and Westlake Warriors. At various times during the operations of the league, Pte. St-Charles Leo's Boys, East End Larks, Laval Scorpions, Verdun Black and Gold, South Shore Colts, Cote St-Luc Jets, St-Laurent Raiders, Chateauguay Raiders, North Shore Knights, and Farnham, among others, had teams participating in the various divisions of the league.

As demographics changed, high schools started cutting their football programmes, and CEGEPs (junior colleges) came into existence in the mid-60s, the ranks of available juvenile-aged players became considerably thinner, and only four teams were available to compete in 1976. A dispute concerning 20-year-old players ensued, and Lachine Lakers withdrew, leaving only three teams to compete LaSalle Raiders, NDG Maple Leafs and Laval Scorpions - an impossible situation resulting in the league's demise.

The Quebec League competed for the Little Grey Cup, and was often pitted against the powerful western representatives from Winnipeg, the Hawkeyes. Lachine dodged a bullet in 1973, defeating the Surrey, B.C. Rams 3-1 in the Little Grey Cup, avoiding the Hawkeyes when their star QB was injured prior to the B.C. semifinal. Lachine had been soundly beaten by Winnipeg in '68 when they visited the Hawkeyes, after a 2-day train ride, by the score of 67-6. Pete Harding was the head coach, and Paul Dewitt was president of the 73 Canadian champs, the only Laker team ever to win it all, the win preserved when Ian Anderson submarined a Surrey player at the one yard line on the final play of the game. The Verdun Black and Gold Bengals won the Little Grey Cup in 1970 by beating the Winnipeg Hawkeyes in Winnipeg on a last play field goal.

Some well-known individuals associated with the league, in addition those already mentioned, include Joe Sutherland (football player extraordinaire) Vernon Pahl ( UPEI and Winnipeg Blue Bombers), Pete Regimbald (Montreal Alouettes and Concordia Stingers), Skip Rochette (Concordia Stingers, Queen's University, and University of Bridgeport), Barclay Allen (Ottawa Roughriders and Montreal Alouettes), Yvan Cournoyer (Montreal Canadiens, Hockey Hall of Fame), Bruce Soutter (Toronto Argonauts), Don Taylor (McGill University 2-way All-Canadian), Mike Dollimore (University of New Brunswick) and Willy Lambert (Montreal Alouettes, McGill University All-Canadian).
