= Bob Stephen =

Profile
- Position: Centre

Personal information
- Born: February 23, 1958; Saint John, New Brunswick, Canada
- Died: February 8, 2009 (aged 50); Ottawa, Ontario, Canada

Career information
- High school: St. Pius X High School (Ottawa)
- CJFL: Ottawa Sooners

Career history
- 1981–1985: Ottawa Rough Riders

Awards and highlights
- CJFL National Champion (1979); Football Canada Cup U17 Team Eastern Ontario National Champions (2004)

George Robert "Bob" Stephen (February 23, 1958 – February 8, 2009) was a professional Canadian football offensive lineman with the Ottawa Rough Riders of the Canadian Football League from 1981 to 1985. He was born in Saint John, New Brunswick.

Stephen went to St. Pius X High School in Ottawa and played junior football with the Ottawa Sooners, with which he won the national championship in 1979.

He joined the Ottawa Rough Riders in the 1981 CFL season as a centre and played all five years of his professional career for the Riders. Following his playing career, he became a minor football coach and mentor with the Myers Riders and the Nepean Redskins. He coached an Eastern Ontario team to gold at the 2004 national championship.

He died at his home in Ottawa on February 8, 2009, of a heart attack.
