= Verdun Shamcats =

Quebec Rugby Football Union team (1950–1966)

General information
- Founded: 1951
- Folded: 1966
- Headquartered: Verdun, Quebec, Canada

League / conference affiliations
- Quebec Rugby Football Union; Quebec Junior Football League

Championships
- League championships: 0; 1958 & 1961

The Verdun Shamcats were a team in the Quebec Rugby Football Union from 1951 until 1966. The team was formed in July 1951 by the amalgamation of five local Verdun junior teams originally created in 1945, into a single, more competitive team in the junior Quebec Rugby Football League. The bulk of the new team was drawn from the Verdun Shamrocks, which became the basis of the "Sham-Cats" team name. The team's initial coach was Gus MacFarlane. He was succeeded in 1953 by Ewart Jones.

CFL great Tony Pajaczkowski of the Calgary Stampeders and Bob Geary of the Montreal Alouettes played for the team. In 1958 they beat the Cornwall Emards to win the league championship. In 1961 they beat the St. Vital Bulldogs 32-31 for the national senior championship. The team, and the league (QSFL), folded after the 1964 season and was replaced by the Verdun Mustangs and later by the Verdun Invictus, in the Metropolitan Junior Football Conference in 1968, who moved up from the QRFU juvenile division.
