= Enzo Ferrari (disambiguation) =

Enzo Ferrari (1898–1988) was the founder of Ferrari NV and Scuderia Ferrari.

Enzo Ferrari may also refer to:

== People ==
- Enzo Ferrari (Italian footballer) (1942–2025), Italian football player/manager
- Enzo Ferrari (Chilean footballer) (born 1979), Chilean football player/manager

== Places ==
- Museo Casa Enzo Ferrari (Italian: Enzo Ferrari House museum), Modena, Italy
- Autodromo Enzo e Dino Ferrari (Italian: Dino and Enzo Ferrari Racetrack), Imola, Italy

== Automotive ==
- Ferrari F140 Enzo Ferrari (Ferrari Enzo streetcar), 2002–2004 supercar
- Ferrari FXX (Ferrari Enzo racecar) 2005–2007 track car
- Ferrari F140 engine (Ferrari Enzo engine)

== See also ==
- Ferrari (disambiguation)
- Enzo (name)
