= Claudio Salinas =

Chilean footballer (born 1976)

Claudio Andrés Salinas Ponce (born April 24, 1976, in Valparaiso, Chile) is a former Chilean footballer who played for clubs of Chile, Brazil, Canada and Switzerland.

== Career ==
In 2004, he moved to Canada and joined Edmonton Aviators alongside his compatriots Jaime Lo Presti and Enzo Ferrari.

== Teams ==
- (Chile) Everton 1994–1999
- (Chile) Colo-Colo 2000–2001
- (Chile) Everton 2002–2003
- (Chile) Santiago Wanderers 2003
- (Canada) Edmonton Aviators 2004
- (Switzerland) Zürich 2004
- (Chile) Deportes Puerto Montt 2004
- (Chile) Unión La Calera 2005
- (Brazil) Vasco da Gama 2006–2007
- (Chile) San Luis 2008
- (Chile) Santiago Wanderers 2009

== Titles ==
- (Chile) Santiago Wanderers 1995 (Chilean Primera B Championship)
