= Enzo Ferrari (Chilean footballer) =

Chilean footballer (born 1979)

Personal information
- Full name: Enzo Giovanni Ferrari Lasnibat
- Date of birth: 1 May 1979 (age 47)
- Place of birth: Villa Alemana, Chile
- Position: Centre-back

Youth career
- Colo-Colo
- Palestino

Senior career*
Years	Team	Apps	(Gls)
1997–2002	Palestino	6	(1)
1998	→ Constitución Unido (loan)		
2003	Deportes Puerto Montt	3	(0)
2004	Edmonton Aviators		
2005	Sūduva Marijampolė	1	(0)
2005–2006	Polis Genova	8	(0)
2006–2007	Bogliasco 75	25	(2)
2007–2008	Virtus Entella	18	(1)
2008–2010	Caperanese	50	(6)
2010–2011	Finale Ligure	25	(9)
2011–2012	Imperia	8	(4)
2012	Navajo		
2013–2014	ASD Carcarese		
2014–2015	Boca Raton FC		

Managerial career
- 2010–2013: Finale Ligure (youth)
- 2013–2014: ASD Carcarese (youth)
- 2014: ASD Carcarese
- 2014–2015: Boca Raton FC (youth)
- 2017–2019: Colo-Colo (youth)
- * Club domestic league appearances and goals

Enzo Giovanni Ferrari Lasnibat (born 1 September 1979) is a Chilean football manager and former player who played as a centre-back for clubs in Chile and abroad.

== Playing career ==
A product of Colo-Colo and Palestino youth systems, Ferrari played for the second from 1997 to 2002, with a stint on loan at Constitución Unido in the Chilean Tercera División. In 2003, he played for Deportes Puerto Montt, also in the Chilean top division.

In 2004, he moved to Canada and joined Edmonton Aviators alongside his compatriots Jaime Lo Presti and Claudio Salinas.

In 2005, he emigrated to Europe and joined the Lithuanian side Sūduva Marijampolė in the A Lyga after a trial with Swiss side AC Bellinzona. In Sūduva Marijampolė, he coincided with the Italian coach Rino Lavezzini.

From 2005 to 2014, he played for several clubs in the Eccellenza Liguria such as Virtus Entella, Finale FC, Imperia, Navajo, among others.

Back in Americas, he played for Boca Raton FC in the APSL in the 2014–15 season.

== Coaching career ==
A football manager graduated at both the INAF (National Football Institute) in Chile and FGIC, Ferrari mainly has worked with youth players at clubs, academies, and workshops. In Italy, he worked as coach of the youth systems at the same time he was a player, for both Finale FC and ASD Carcarese. After getting an offer from the United States, in 2014 he joined Boca Raton FC as coach of the youth system, performing also as a player.

In his homeland, he worked for Colo-Colo youth system in Lo Prado commune from 2017 to 2019.
