= Maserati MC12 =

Two-seater sports car

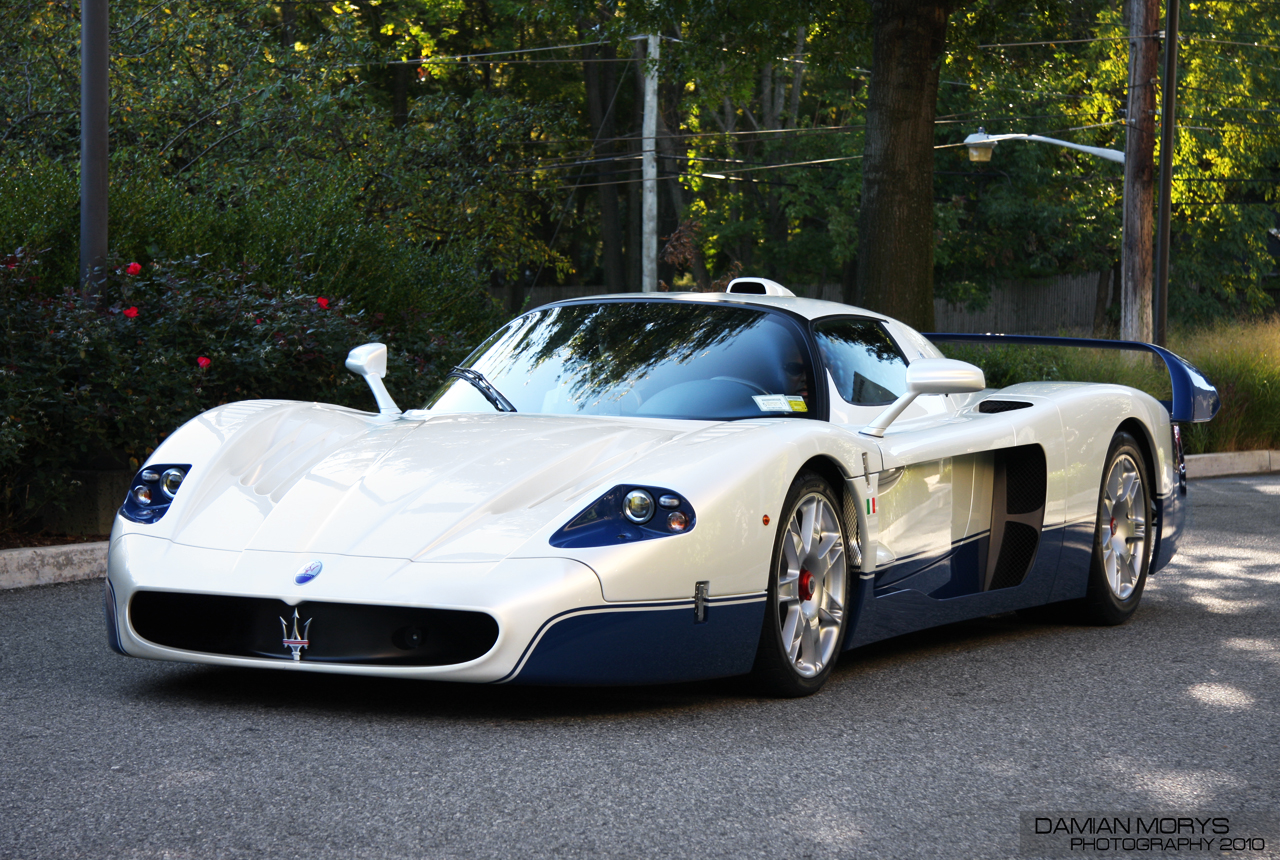

Overview
- Manufacturer: Maserati
- Also called: Maserati MC12 Versione Competizione; Maserati MC12 Stradale; Maserati MCC (development codename)
- Production: 2004–2005
- Assembly: Italy: Modena
- Designer: Frank Stephenson

Body and chassis
- Class: Sports car (S); Racing car
- Body style: 2-door coupé; 2-door targa top (road car)
- Layout: Longitudinally-mounted, rear mid-engine, rear-wheel drive
- Related: Enzo Ferrari; Ferrari FXX

Powertrain
- Engine: 5,998 cc (366.0 cu in) Ferrari-Maserati M144A V12
- Power output: 463 kW (630 PS; 621 hp) and 652 N⋅m (481 lbf⋅ft)
- Transmission: 6-speed Cambiocorsa automated manual

Dimensions
- Wheelbase: 2,800 mm (110.2 in)
- Length: 5,143 mm (202.5 in)
- Width: 2,096 mm (82.5 in)
- Height: 1,205 mm (47.4 in)
- Curb weight: 1,500 kg (3,300 lb)

Chronology
- Successor: Maserati MC20 (spiritual)

The Maserati MC12 (Tipo M144S) is a limited production two-seater sports car produced by Italian car maker Maserati from 2004 to 2005, to allow a racing variant to compete in the FIA GT Championship. The car entered production in 2004, with 25 cars produced. A further 25 were produced in 2005 after the FIA changed the rules and reduced the maximum length allowed. The second batch of 25 are 150 mm shorter than the originals, making a total of 50 cars available for customers. With the addition of 12 cars produced for racing, a total of just 62 were ever produced.

Maserati designed and built the car on the chassis of the Ferrari Enzo, but the final car is much larger and has a lower drag coefficient, along with being longer, wider and taller and has a sharper nose and smoother curves than the Enzo. The Enzo had quicker acceleration, shorter braking distance, and a higher top speed at 350 km/h (217 mph), 20 km/h (12 mph) more than the MC12.

The MC12 was developed to signal Maserati's return to racing after 37 years. The road version was produced to homologate the race version. One requirement for participation in the FIA GT is the production of at least 25 road cars. Three GT1 race cars were entered into the FIA GT with great success. Maserati began racing the MC12 in the FIA GT toward the end of the 2004 season, winning the race held at the Zhuhai International Circuit. The racing MC12s were entered into the American Le Mans Series races in 2005 but exceeded the size restrictions and consequently paid weight penalties due to excess range.

== Development ==
Under the direction of Giorgio Ascanelli, Maserati began development of an FIA GT-eligible race car. This car, which would eventually be named the MC12, was initially called the "MCC" ("Maserati Corse Competizione") and was to be developed simultaneously with a road-going version, called the "MCS" ("Maserati Corse Stradale"). Frank Stephenson, Director of Ferrari-Maserati Concept Design and Development at the time, did the majority of the body styling, but the initial shape was developed during wind tunnel testing from an idea presented by Giorgetto Giugiaro. The MCC has a very similar body shape to the MC12, but there are several key differences, most notably the rear spoiler. Andrea Bertolini served as the chief test driver throughout development, although some testing was done by Michael Schumacher, who frequently tested the MCC at the Fiorano Circuit. During the development process, the MCC name was set aside after Maserati established the car's official name, MC12.

The car is based heavily on the Enzo Ferrari, using a slightly modified version of the Ferrari F140 V12 engine, the same gearbox (but given the unique name of "Maserati Cambiocorsa") and the same chassis and track (length of axle between the wheels). The windshield is the only externally visible component shared with the Enzo; the MC12 has a unique body which is wider, longer and slightly taller. The increased size creates greater downforce across the MC12's body in addition to the downforce created by the two-metre spoiler.

== Design ==
The MC12 is a two-door coupé with a targa top roof, although the detached roof cannot be stored in the car. The mid-rear layout (engine between the axles but behind the cabin) keeps the centre of gravity in the middle of the car, which increases stability and improves the car's cornering ability. The standing weight distribution is 41% front and 59% rear. At speed, however, the downforce provided by the rear spoiler affects this to the extent that at 200 km/h (125 mph) the downforce is 34% front and 66% rear.

=== Interior ===
Even though the car is designed as a homologation vehicle and is a modification of a racing car, the interior is intended to be luxurious. The interior is a mix of gel-coated carbon fibre, blue leather and silver "Brightex", a synthetic material which was found to be "too expensive for the fashion industry". The centre console features the characteristic Maserati oval analogue clock and a blue ignition button, but it has been criticised for lacking a radio, car stereo or a place to install an aftermarket sound system.

=== Exterior ===
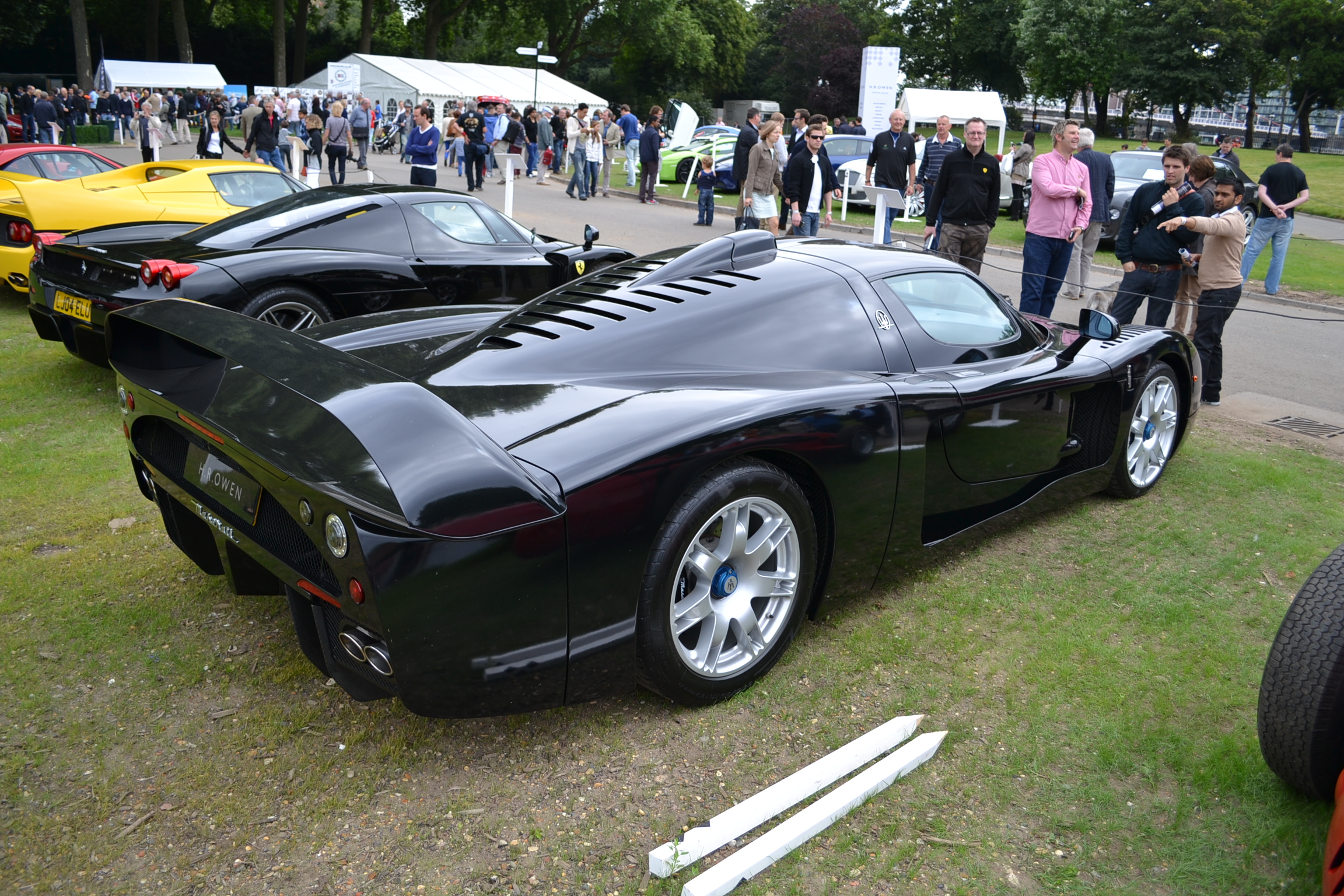
Rear view

The body of the car, made entirely of carbon fibre, underwent extensive wind tunnel testing to achieve maximum downforce across all surfaces. As a result, the rear spoiler is 2 m (79 in) wide but only 30 mm (1.2 in) thick, the underside of the car is smooth, and the rear bumper has diffusers to take advantage of ground effect. Air is sucked into the engine compartment through the air scoop; its positioning on top of the cabin makes the car taller than the Enzo. The exterior is available only in the white-and-blue colour scheme, a tribute to the America Camoradi racing team that drove the Maserati Tipo Birdcages in the early 1960s. Bespoke colour schemes are available by paying an extra amount.

The car is noted for its large size. It is wider and longer than a Hummer H2, making it one of the longest production supercars ever made. This, combined with the lack of a rear window, can make parking the MC12 challenging.

Exterior color	Picture
White ("Fuji white" with blue accents)	
Blue carbon with Italian flag center stripe	
Black	

=== Engine ===
The MC12 sports a 232 kg (511 lb), 5,998 cc (366.0 cu in) Enzo Ferrari-derived longitudinally-mounted 65° V12 engine. Each cylinder has 4 valves, lubricated via a dry sump system, with a compression ratio of 11.2:1. These combine to provide a maximum torque of 652 N⋅m (481 lb⋅ft) at 5,500 rpm and a maximum power of 463 kW (630 PS; 621 hp) at 7,500 rpm. The redline rpm is at 7,500—despite being safe up to 7,700—whereas the Enzo has its redline at 8,000 rpm.

The Maserati MC12 can accelerate from 0 to 100 km/h (62 mph) in 3.8 seconds (though Motor Trend Magazine managed 3.7 seconds) and on to 200 km/h (124 mph) in 9.9 seconds. It can complete a standing (from stationary) 402 metres (1/4 mi) in 11.3 seconds with a terminal speed of 200 km/h (124 mph) or a standing kilometre in 20.1 seconds. The maximum speed of the Maserati MC12 is 330 km/h (205 mph). Another change on the engine compared with the Enzo was the use of gears to drive the camshafts instead of chains.

Power is fed to the wheels through a rear-mounted, six-speed automated manual. The gearbox is the same as the Enzo's transmission (tuned to different gear ratios) but renamed "Maserati Cambiocorsa". It provides a shift time of just 150 milliseconds and is mechanical with a 215 mm (8.5 in) twin-plate dry clutch.

=== Chassis ===
The MC12's chassis is a monocoque made of carbon and nomex, with an aluminium sub-chassis at the front and rear. It has a roll bar to provide additional strength, comfort and safety. Double wishbone suspension with push-rod-operated coil springs provide stability and dampers smooth the ride for the passengers. The front of the car can be raised for speed bumps and hills by pressing a button that extends the front suspension. There are two modes for the chassis' tuning which can also be changed with a button in the cabin: "sport", the standard setting, and "race", which features less of the "Bosch ASR" (anti-slip regulation) traction control, faster shifts and stiffer suspension.

=== Wheels ===
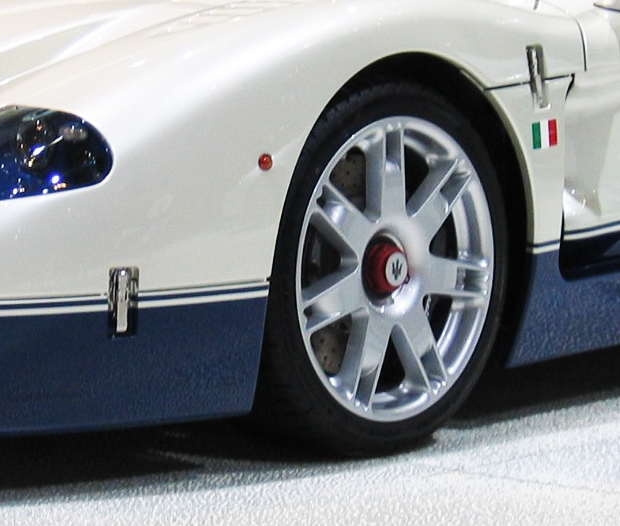
Maserati MC12 wheel

The MC12 has 485 mm (19 in) wheels with a width of 230 mm (9 in) at the front and 330 mm (13 in) at the rear. The tyres are "Pirelli P Zero Corsa" with codes of 245/35 ZR 19 for the front tyres and 345/35 ZR 19 for the rear. The brakes are Brembo disc brakes with a Bosch anti-lock braking system (ABS). The front brakes have a diameter of 380 mm (15 in) with six-piston calipers and the rear brakes have a diameter of 335 mm (13.2 in) with four-piston calipers. The centre-lock wheel nuts that hold the wheels to the chassis are colour-coded; red on the left of the car, blue on the right.

== Reception ==
The car has generally received mixed reviews, with critics saying it is hard to drive, overpriced and too large. Other criticisms include the lack of a trunk, rear window, spare tire and radio, and the way the car's engine was limited or "drugged". Former driver for Vitaphone Racing Team, Andrea Bertolini, the chief test driver throughout the development, said the car, "reacts well and is very reliable in its reactions."

The Top Gear television series acquired an MC12, and test driver The Stig achieved a lap time of 1:18.9 around the Top Gear track—0.1 seconds faster than his lap in the Enzo Ferrari. Host Jeremy Clarkson also drove it, comparing it to the Maserati Biturbo, a car he disliked. Clarkson criticised the car greatly, pointing out that, unlike the Enzo, it lacks a rear window. Despite his criticisms, he complimented the smooth ride.

Motor Trend Magazine reviewer Frank Markus had a more positive opinion. Despite initial skepticism he said, "It turns out that the Enzo makes a more comfortable and attractive road car when made over as a butch Maserati racer in street couture". Markus complimented the stability of braking and the handling ability of the MC12, especially the drifting allowed by the traction control when cornering, commenting that "There's none of the knife-edged limit handling we criticised in the more extreme Enzo. It's even more forgiving at the limit than an Acura NSX."

When Automobile Magazine tested an MC12, reviewer Preston Lerner called it "user-friendly", praising the responsiveness and simplicity of driving. Lerner approved of Frank Stephenson's work with the styling of both the car's exterior and interior, calling the trim "Speed-Racer-ish" but "without looking as though it belongs in a Nitrous-ized Civic". He also complimented the ASR's level of intervention, commenting that it "lets the fun factor get reasonably high before kicking in".

== MC12 GT1 ==
Maserati MC12 GT1
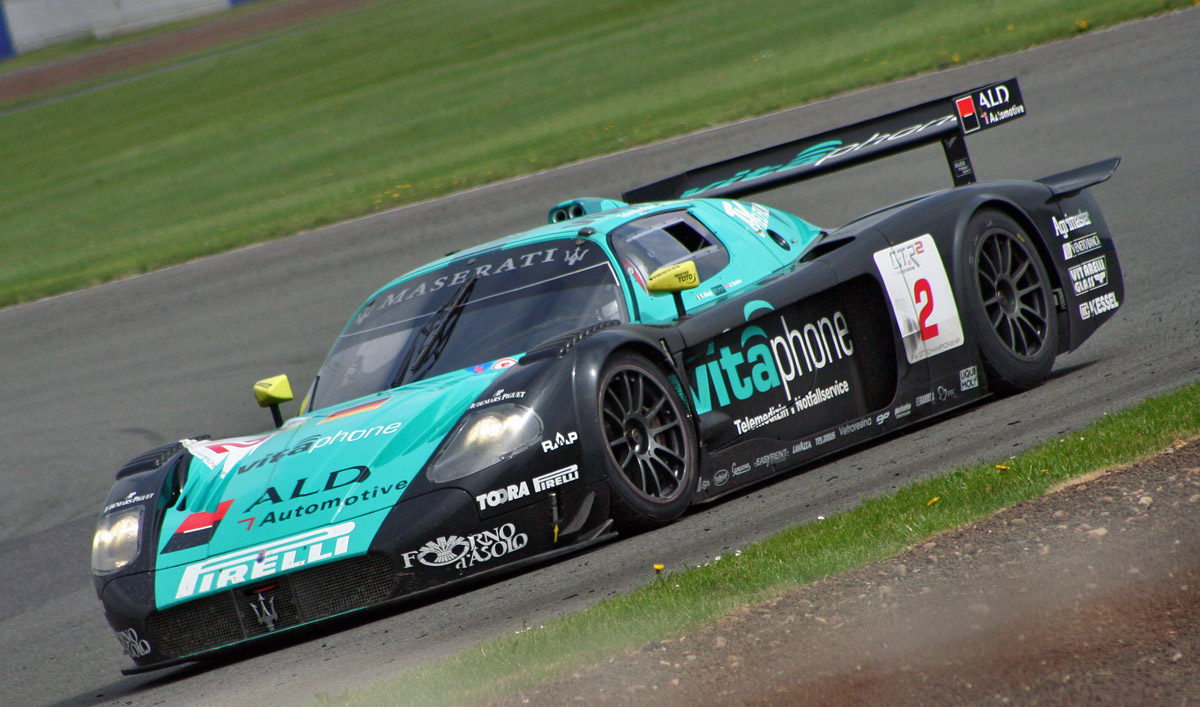
- Category: FIA GT1; American Le Mans GT1
- Constructor: Maserati

Technical specifications
- Chassis: Carbon-fibre, nomex honeycomb monocoque chassis, front and rear aluminium safety subframes with roll cage
- Suspension (front): Double wishbone, push rod operated over damper
- Suspension (rear): As front
- Length: 5,143 mm (202 in)
- Width: 2,096 mm (83 in)
- Height: 1,205 mm (47 in)
- Axle track: Front: 1,660 mm (65 in); Rear: 1,650 mm (65 in)
- Wheelbase: 2,800 mm (110 in)
- Engine: Maserati M144B/2 6.0 L (6,000 cc; 366 cu in) V12 naturally aspirated DOHC mid-engined, longitudinally mounted
- Transmission: 6-speed sequential semi-automatic paddle-shift gearbox
- Weight: 1,250 kg (2,760 lb) (FIA GT); 1,200 kg (2,600 lb) (ALMS)
- Fuel: Ethanol E10
- Tyres: Michelin, Pirelli

Competition history
- Notable entrants: (Italy) AF Corse (Monaco) JMB Racing (Germany) Vitaphone Racing Team (Italy) Scuderia Playteam (Italy) Racing Box (United States) Doran Racing (Germany) Triple H Team Hegersport
- Notable drivers: (Finland) Mika Salo, (Italy) Andrea Bertolini, (Austria) Karl Wendlinger, (Germany) Michael Bartels, (Germany) Timo Scheider, (Italy) Thomas Biagi, (Italy) Fabio Babini, (Belgium) Eric van de Poele, (United Kingdom) Jamie Davies, (Italy) Andrea Piccini, (San Marino) Christian Montanari, (Portugal) Miguel Ramos, (France) Stéphane Sarrazin, (Brazil) Alexandre Negrão, (Italy) Alessandro Pier Guidi (Italy) Luca Cappellari
- Debut: 2004 FIA GT Imola 500 km
Races	Wins	Poles	F/Laps
94	40	N/A	N/A
- Teams' Championships: 6 (2005 – 2009 FIA GT, 2010 FIA GT1)
- Constructors' Championships: 2 (2005 FIA GT, 2007 FIA GT)
- Drivers' Championships: 6 (2006 Italian GT, 2006 – 2009 FIA GT, 2010 FIA GT1)

=== FIA GT ===
In 2004, Maserati completed three MC12 GT1 race cars intended for the FIA GT GT1 class. The AF Corse factory-backed squad debuted the race at Imola, yet the FIA did not allow the MC12 to score points due to its debated homologation. Even with this setback, the team managed to take second and third places. At the next round at Oschersleben, the MC12 of Andrea Bertolini and Mika Salo won for the first time. At the final round of the year at Zhuhai, the FIA finally agreed to homologate the MC12s and allow them to score points towards the championship. With this, the MC12 again took victory, allowing it to score enough points to finish 7th in the teams championship.

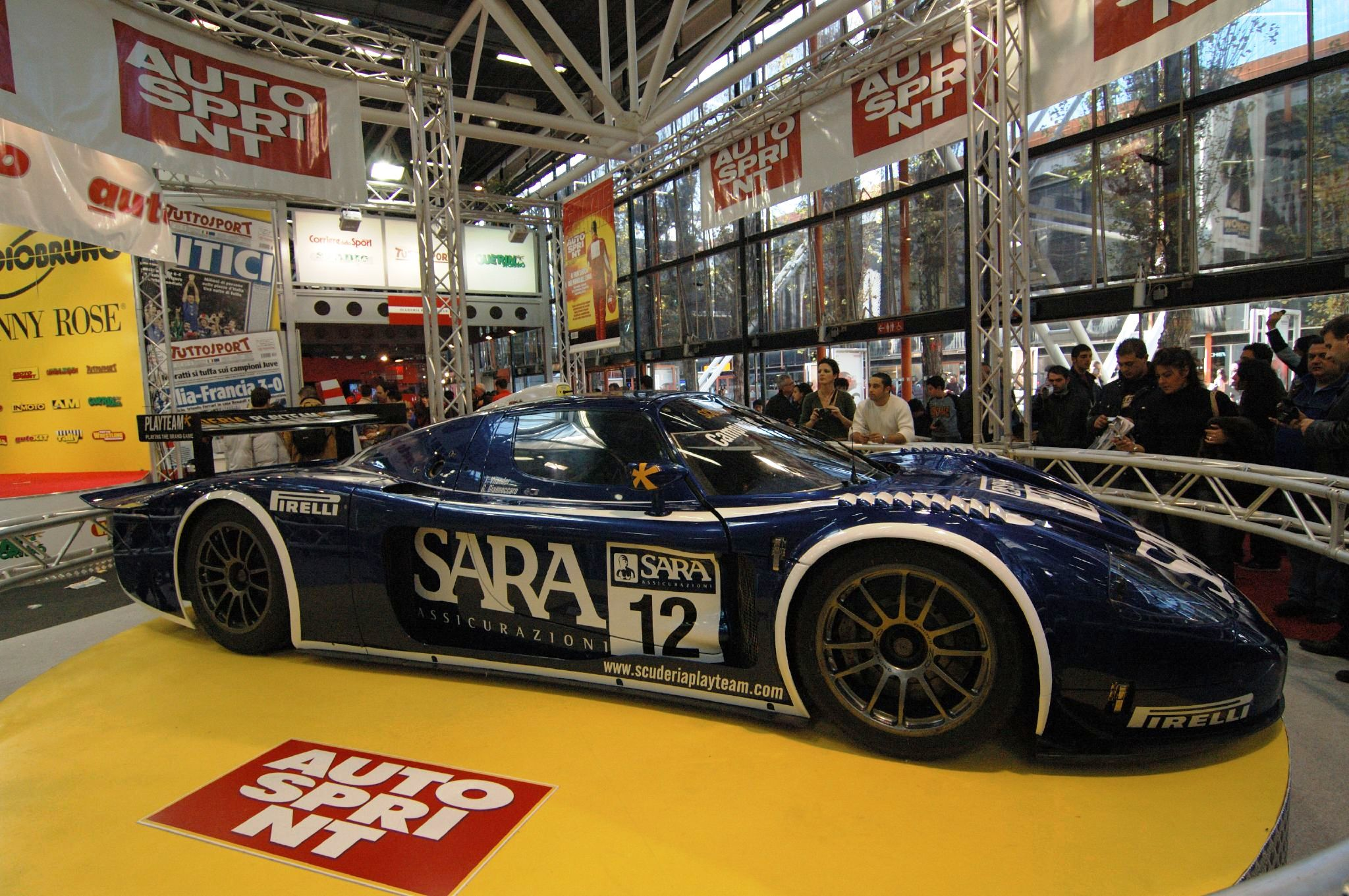
The Scuderia Playteam car entered in the FIA GT Championship

In 2005, Maserati won the FIA GT Manufacturers Cup with 239 points: almost double the score of next competitor (Ferrari with 125 points). The two teams that entered MC12s into the FIA GT, Vitaphone Racing and JMB Racing, finished first and second respectively in the Team Cup, with Vitaphone winning by a considerable margin. Four of the MC12 drivers were in the running to win the FIA GT Drivers' Title at the Bahrain International Circuit at the start of the final race of 2005: Karl Wendlinger and Andrea Bertolini each on 71 points and Timo Scheider and Michael Bartels on 70. Gabriele Gardel of Ferrari was also on 70 points, however, and in the crucial race he placed ahead of all of the Maseratis, driving an older Ferrari 550 Maranello. Gardel took the title, leaving all of the Maserati drivers within four points of first place (Scheider and Wendlinger receiving four points for the race).

In 2006, the only team representing Maserati was Vitaphone Racing. On September 30, 2006, Vitaphone secured the Teams' Championship for the 2006 season despite their drivers placing 5th and 7th in the Budapest 500 km race with weight penalties of 85 kilograms and 105 kilograms respectively. Bertolini and Bartels also shared first place in the Drivers' Championship on 71 points but the manufacturers cup went to Aston Martin.

Vitaphone Racing again won the GT1 Teams' Championship in the 2007 season on 115 points, followed by fellow MC12 team Scuderia Playteam on 63 points. JMB Racing also entered two MC12s, but they were used by amateur drivers competing in the Citation Cup, which was won by JMB's driver Ben Aucott. Maserati also won the Manufacturers' Cup by a significant margin while Thomas Biagi won the Drivers' Championship. Fellow Vitaphone drivers Miguel Ramos and Christian Montanari tied for sixth, while Playteam's Andrea Bertolini and Andrea Piccini were just behind.

For 2008, Vitaphone Racing returned with a pair of MC12s for drivers Andrea Bertolini, Michael Bartels, and Miguel Ramos, as well as newcomer Alexandre Negrão. The season ended with another Teams' Championship for Vitaphone Racing (122.5 points) and Drivers' Championship for Bertolini and Bartels. In the ninth round, the team fielded a third car under the name of Team Vitasystem, driven by Pedro Lamy and Matteo Bobbi which scored one point. JMB Racing retained a single MC12 for 2007 Citation Cup winner Ben Aucott and drivers Peter Kutemann and Alain Ferté, competing in the first five events of the championship.

In the 2009 season, the Vitaphone Racing won the fifth consecutive Team Championship, while Bertolini and Bartels gained their third Drivers' Championship. The other two drivers were Miguel Ramos and Alex Müller, who ended in sixth position. Starting from the fourth round, the team entered a third car under the name of Vitaphone Racing Team DHL, driven by Matteo Bobbi and Alessandro Pier Guidi, achieving good results: despite being only a one-car team, with a partial season involvement, they ended the Teams' Championship in fourth position (32 points), scoring a victory in the last round.

=== FIA GT1 World Championship ===
With the inauguration of the FIA GT1 World Championship in 2010, Maserati continued their commitment to the series with two teams entering. Vitaphone Racing Team, the defending FIA GT Champions, won five races en route to the Drivers' and Teams' World Championships. The second team representing Maserati was Alfrid Heger's Triple H Team Hegersport.

=== Italian GT ===
MC12s have had great success racing in Italy, and have replaced the GT3 "Maserati Trofeo Light" as Maserati's representative in the Italian GT Championship. In 2005 Maserati introduced two MC12s to the GT1 division under Scuderia Playteam and Racing Box, with the teams placing first and third overall respectively. The cars were re-entered in 2006, with Scuderia Playteam again securing overall victory and Racing Box coming second. From 2007, GT1 cars are not permitted in the championship, and Scuderia Playteam moved to the FIA GT Championship.

Racing Box also participated in the non-championship 6 Hours of Vallelunga twice, winning in 2005 with Michele Rugolo, Leonardo Maddelena, and Davide Mastracci, then again in 2006 with Pedro Lamy, Marco Cioci, and Piergiuseppe Perazzini.

=== Super GT ===
In 2006, the Le Mans winning outfit Team Goh was intending to race a Maserati MC12 in the Super GT series in Japan. However, the team was forced to withdraw because of driver problems (Jan Magnussen falling ill suddenly and returning to Denmark) and disappointing lap times at the Suzuka Circuit during testing. While the car was faster than its Super GT prototype rivals down the straights, it was losing more than a second per lap in the corners due to its poorer aerodynamics.

=== American Le Mans Series ===
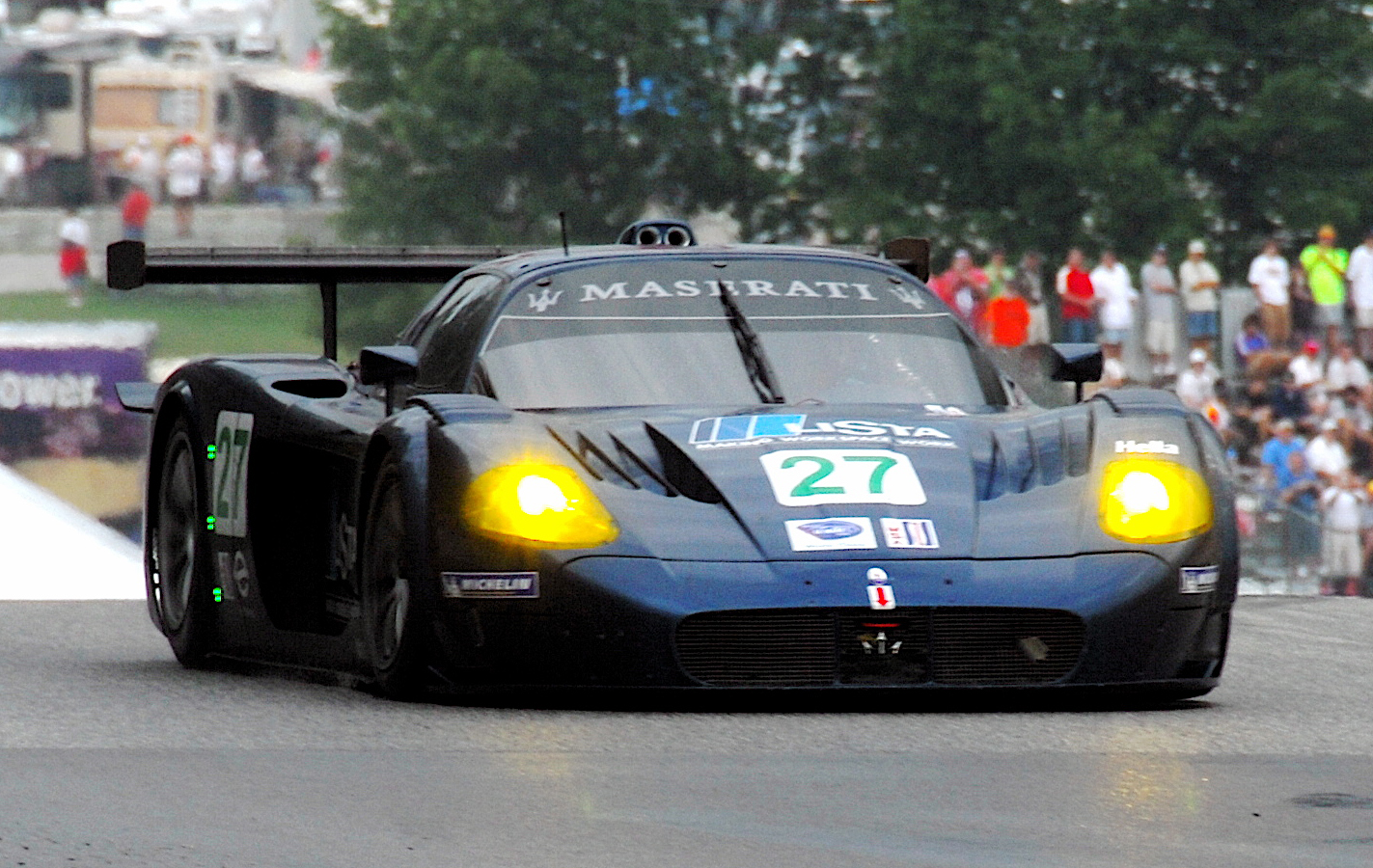
Doran Racing's MC12 GT1 at Road America in 2007.

In 2004 the Maserati MC12s were unable to compete in series backed by the ACO, such as the Le Mans Endurance Series (LMES) in Europe and the American Le Mans Series (ALMS) because they exceeded both the length and width restrictions for their class. The car's nose was shortened by 201 mm (7.9 in) to attempt to comply with regulations, but was still 66 mm (2.6 in) too wide. In 2005 the governing body of the ALMS, the International Motor Sports Association (IMSA), allowed the MC12s to compete as a guest with the agreement that they were not allowed to score championship points and were forced to run a weight penalty. Some ALMS teams initially objected to the participation of the MC12 due to the possibility that an accident could eliminate their chances at the 24 Hours of Le Mans, but the MC12 was finally allowed to race. The ACO stood by their ruling on the car by forbidding it from entering other Le Mans series.

The lone MC12 would be campaigned under the Maserati Corse banner, but run by the American Risi Competizione team. The 2005 American Le Mans Series season was not as successful for the team, with the team scoring no wins. In the final race at Mazda Raceway Laguna Seca, the MC12 was clipped by a competitor, causing damage that resulted in a lengthy pit stop. After resuming the race, a loss of traction caused by cold tires made the car hit a curb, which broke the radiator and took the MC12 out of the race.

In August 2007, Fredy Lienhard and Didier Theys announced their preparation of a former FIA GT MC12 for use in the American Le Mans Series. The car made its debut at Road America, finishing 3rd in the GT1 class after qualifying competitively. The only other race entered was Round 11 at Road Atlanta for the Petit Le Mans where the team failed to finish following an accident, but were still classified second in class. Doran's Maserati however had qualified on the class pole. The team selected Michelin tires instead of the Pirellis originally used by Maserati Corse in 2005, and was also allowed to race with a full-width rear wing instead of the smaller wing used by Maserati Corse and teams in FIA GT, although the wing was not as tall. IMSA also allowed Doran to score points in the American Le Mans Series championships.

== MC12 Versione Corse ==
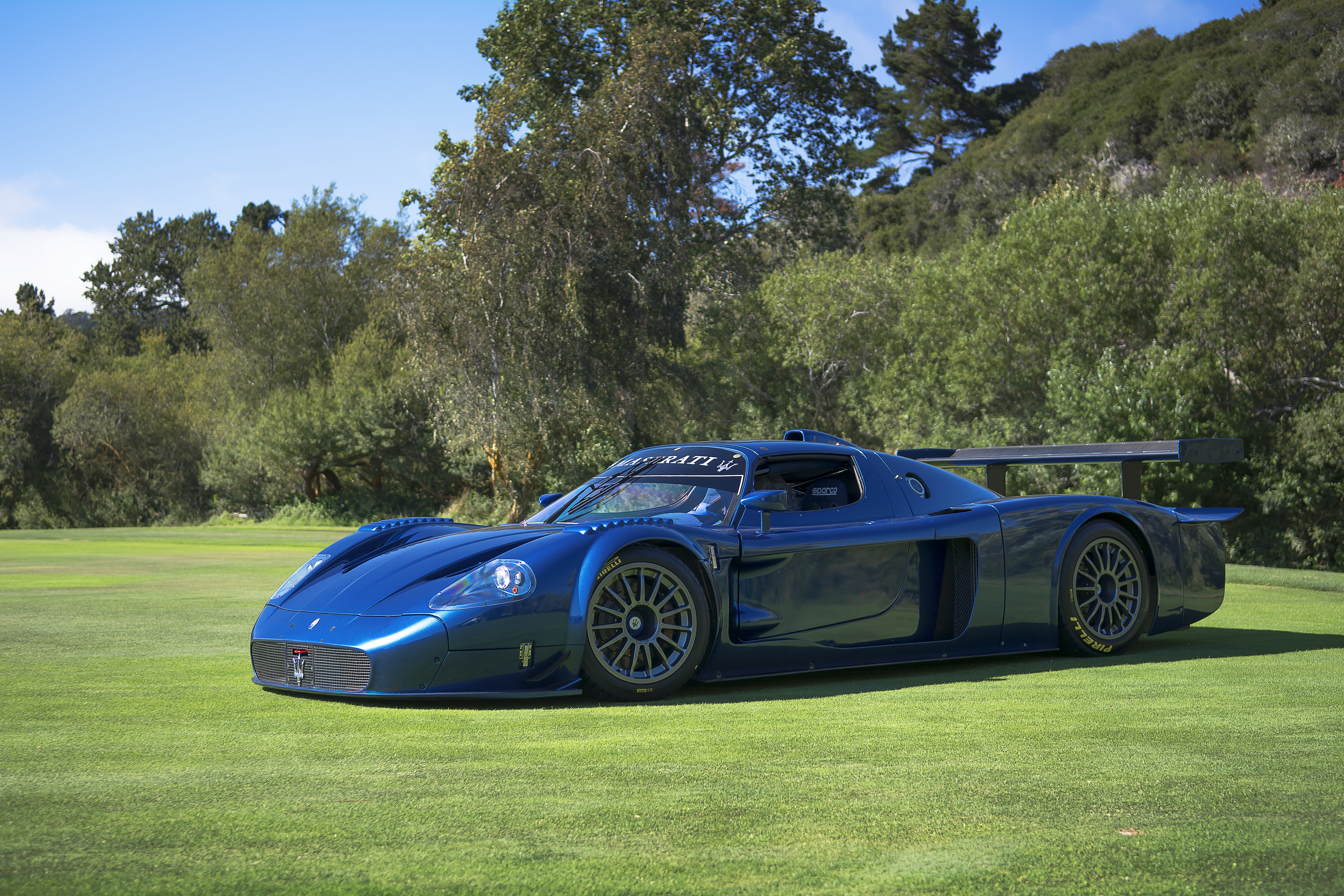
A MC12 Corse in Victory Blue.

The MC12 Versione Corse is a variant of the MC12 intended for racetrack use. In contrast to the race version of the MC12, of which street-legal versions were produced for homologation purposes, the MC12 Corse is intended for private use, albeit restricted to the track, as the Corse's modifications make it illegal to drive on the road.

The Versione Corse was developed directly from the MC12 GT1, which won the 2005 FIA GT Manufacturers Cup. The car was released in mid-2006, "in response to the customer demand to own the MC12 racing car and fueled by the growth in track days, where owners can drive their cars at high speeds in the safety of a race track", as stated by Edward Butler, General Manager for Maserati in Australia and New Zealand. In similar fashion to the Ferrari FXX, although the owners are private individuals, Maserati is responsible for the storage, upkeep, and maintenance of the cars, and they are only driven on specially organized track days. Unlike the FXX, Versione Corses are not used for research and development, and are used only for entertainment. Three Maserati MC12 Versione Corses were converted to road legal use by German tuning firm Edo Competition and feature a slight power increase, a butterfly intake exhaust system and adjustable road suspension system.

Only twelve MC12 Versione Corses were sold to selected customers, each of whom paid €1 million (US$1.47 million) for the privilege. Another three vehicles were produced for testing and publicity purposes. The Versione Corse shares its engine with the MC12 GT1; the powerplant produces 555 kW (755 PS; 745 hp) at 8,000 rpm, 90 kW (122 PS; 120 hp) more than the road going MC12. The MC12 Versione Corse shares the GT1's shortened nose, which was a requirement for entry into the American Le Mans Series. The car was available in a single standard colour, named "Blue Victory", though the car's paint could be customized upon request. The MC12 Versione Corse possesses steel/carbon racing brakes, but is not fitted with an anti-lock braking system.

== Birdcage 75th ==
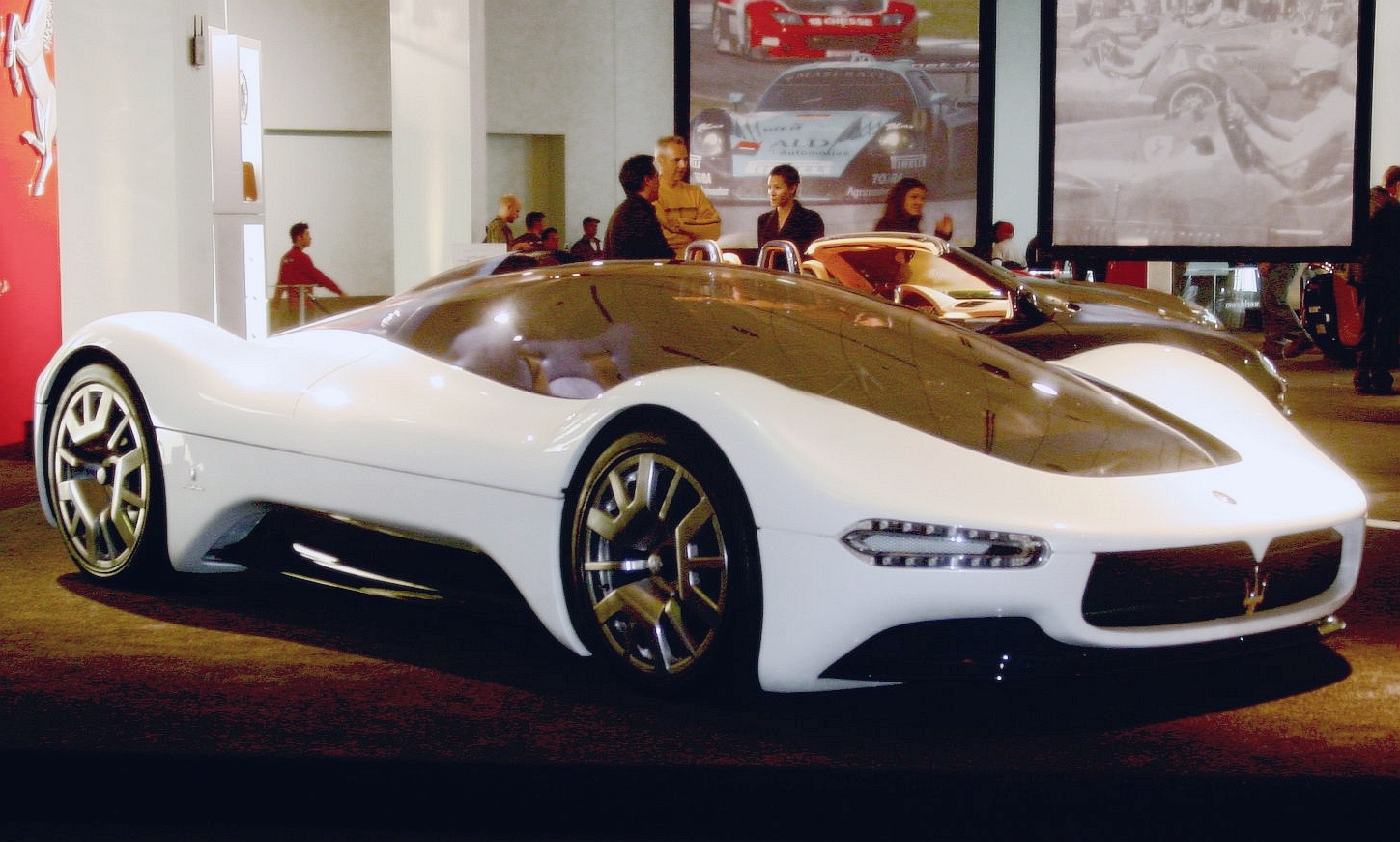
The Maserati Birdcage 75th at the 2006 LA Auto Show.

The Maserati Birdcage 75th is a concept car developed by automobile manufacturer Maserati and designed by Pininfarina. It was first introduced at the 2005 Geneva Auto Show and was based on the MC12's chassis. It draws inspiration from the Maserati Tipo 61 Birdcage of the 1960s and was made as a celebration of Pininfarina's 75th anniversary.

== See also ==
- Riverside International Automotive Museum
