= Ross Ongaro =

Canadian soccer player

Personal information
- Full name: Rosario Ongaro
- Date of birth: September 9, 1959 (age 67)
- Place of birth: Edmonton, Alberta, Canada
- Height: 1.83 m (6 ft 0 in)
- Position: Forward

Senior career*
Years	Team	Apps	(Gls)
1979–1981	Edmonton Drillers	35	(1)
1980–1981	Edmonton Drillers (indoor)	27	(11)
1982–1984	Cleveland Force (indoor)	24	(6)
1983	Edmonton Eagles	?	(6)
1984	Memphis Americans (indoor)	17	(17)
1984–1985	Milwaukee Wave (indoor)	39	(40)
1985–1989	Edmonton Brick Men	36	(24)

International career
1979	Canada Olympic	1	(0)

Managerial career
- 1984–1985: Milwaukee Wave (assistant)
- 1985–1987: Edmonton Brick Men (assistant)
- 1990: Edmonton Brick Men
- 1996–2000: Edmonton Drillers
- 2004: Edmonton F.C.
- 2003–2011: Canada Futsal
- 2006–2011: Canada Beach
- 2011–2015: China Beach
- * Club domestic league appearances and goals

Ross Ongaro (born September 9, 1959) is a retired Canadian soccer player who earned one cap each with the Canada U-20 men's national soccer team and Canadian Olympic soccer team. He played professionally in the North American Soccer League, Major Indoor Soccer League, Western Soccer Alliance and American Indoor Soccer Association. He has coached extensively at the professional level and was the head coach of the Canadian Beach Soccer and Futsal Teams until September 2011. He has been hired by the Chinese Football Association to become their National Beach Soccer Head Coach.

== Player ==
=== Professional ===
In 1980, Ongaro signed with the Edmonton Drillers in the North American Soccer League (NASL). In the fall of 1981, he moved to the Cleveland Force of the Major Indoor Soccer League where he played two seasons. In the summer of 1983, he played for the Edmonton Eagles of the Canadian Professional Soccer League. The Eagles went undefeated, winning the CPSL championship as Ongaro led the league in scoring. In the fall of 1983, he joined the Memphis Americans for the 1983–1984 MISL season. In the fall of 1984, he joined the Milwaukee Wave of the American Indoor Soccer Association where he served as both an assistant coach and player. He was the league's second leading goal scorer and finished second on the points list during 1985–1986. In 1986, he played for the Edmonton Brick Men in the Western Soccer Alliance.

=== National team ===
From 1977 to 1979, Ongaro played for the Canada U-20 men's national soccer team. He was on the roster of the team at the 1979 FIFA World Youth Championship. Ongaro also played one Olympic qualifying match in 1979. He Started vs Bermuda in Ottawa.

== Coach ==
His coaching experience began as a Player – Assistant Coach with the Edmonton Brick Men (WSA/CSL) from 1985 to 1987. In 1990, he spent one season as head coach of the Brick Men. In 1996, the Chicago Power of the National Professional Soccer League came under new ownership which moved the team to Edmonton. The team was renamed the Edmonton Drillers and hired Ongaro as head coach. He was the 1997 and 1999 NPSL Coach of the Year. In 2004, he coached the Edmonton F.C. of the USL A-League.

On August 14, 2003, Ongaro was named by the Canadian Soccer Association as head coach for the Canadian National Futsal team. In his first competition he led the Canadian team to a bronze medal in the LA classic tournament. The first CONCACAF series of games under his tenure was a two-legged tie vs Panama, with the winner moving on to the CONCACAF Futsal Final Round. The CSA did not allow a home game. Canada had to play both games in Panama. After winning the first game 5–4 Panama defeated Canada in the second game and thus an 11:6 on aggregate (5–4, 1–7). Ongaro is now joining the Chinese Football Association as Head Coach of their Beach Soccer Team. He has led the Chinese Men's National team to a silver medal in the 2012 Asia Beach Games and a gold medal in the Gold Cup 2013. Every professional team Ongaro has coached has gone on to the play-offs. The Canadian National Beach team went on to finish 7 th in the 2006 World Cup in Brazil. In Three years as the Chinese National team Head coach he has moved the program from 80 th ranked to presently 20 th in the World. He has been rewarded with a new 2-year contract. He is the Only Canadian Coach in History to lead a National Soccer program and qualify for a World Cup Final 8 position at a Senior men's competition. Ross became a FIFA instructor after leading the Canadian National Beach Soccer team to a 7th place quarter-final finish in the 2006 World Cup in Brazil. He has represented Canada as a FIFA Instructor in 5 continents. He has also been on the FIFA World Cup Technical Study group for the 2008, 2009, 2011, 2015 and 2017. He has been the national coach for the Chinese Men's National Team for the past 5 years. He led them to a silver medal in the Asia Beach Games and a gold Medal in the Asia Cup competition. Both firsts for China at the men's level.

== Personal ==
In 2019 his nephew, Easton Ongaro, was a professional soccer player as well.
