= José Luis Campi =

Argentine footballer

Personal information
- Date of birth: 27 January 1971 (age 55)
- Place of birth: Colegiales, Argentina
- Height: 1.94 m (6 ft 4 in)
- Position: Goalkeeper

Senior career*
| Years | Team | Apps | (Gls) |
| 1990–1995 | Atlanta | 85 | (0) |
| 1995–1998 | Gimnasia y Esgrima de Jujuy | 12 | (0) |
| 1999 | Cobreloa | 26 | (0) |
| 2000–2002 | Platense | 38 | (0) |
| 2001–2002 | → Deportes Concepción (loan) | 21 | (0) |
| 2003 | Deportes Puerto Montt | 28 | (0) |
| 2004 | Edmonton Aviators | 14 | (0) |
| 2004 | Altos Hornos Zapla | 10 | (0) |
| 2005–2007 | Gimnasia y Esgrima de Jujuy | 12 | (0) |
| 2007–2008 | Talleres de Perico | 25 | (0) |
| 2008–2010 | Juventud Antoniana | 57 | (1) |
| Total | | 304 | (1) |
- * Club domestic league appearances and goals

José Luis Campi (born 27 January 1971) is an Argentine former professional footballer who played as a goalkeeper for clubs of Argentina, Chile and Canada.
