= Carmelo Rago =

Canadian soccer player

Personal information
- Full name: Carmelo Rago Jr.
- Date of birth: 11 May 1986 (age 40)
- Place of birth: Canada
- Position: Forward

Senior career*
Years	Team	Apps	(Gls)
- Deportes Puerto Montt
2004	Edmonton Aviators	5	(0)
- * Club domestic league appearances and goals

Carmelo Rago Jr. (born 11 May 1986 in Canada) is a Canadian retired soccer player.

== Career ==
At the age of 16, Rago played for Deportes Puerto Montt in Chile. However, he sustained stress fractures in both shins due to the artificial grass there, which prevented him from representing the Canada under-17 national team and achieving his goal to play in Italy.

Rago has two brothers, Antonio and Pasquale Rago, who are both soccer players.
