= Ferrari Enzo =

Italian flagship sports car

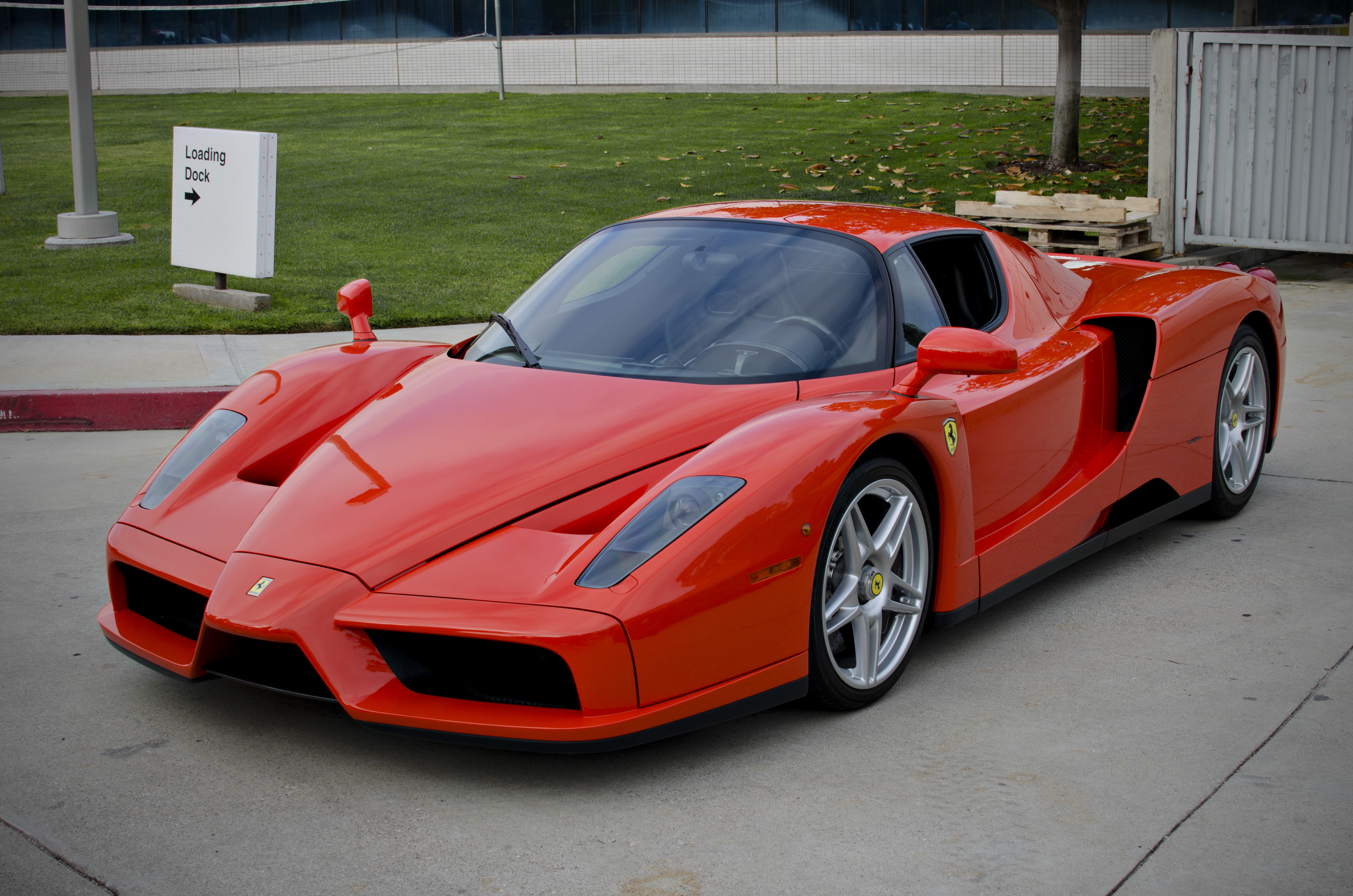

Overview
- Manufacturer: Ferrari S.p.A.
- Production: 2002–2004
- Assembly: Italy: Maranello
- Designer: Ken Okuyama at Pininfarina; Frank Stephenson (FXX)

Body and chassis
- Class: Sports car (S)
- Body style: 2-door berlinetta
- Layout: Rear mid-engine, rear-wheel drive
- Doors: Butterfly
- Related: Ferrari FXX; Maserati MC12; Ferrari P4/5; Maserati Birdcage 75th

Powertrain
- Engine: 6.0 L Tipo F140 B V12
- Power output: 660 PS (485 kW; 651 hp)
- Transmission: 6-speed F1 Graziano automated manual

Dimensions
- Wheelbase: 2,650 mm (104.3 in)
- Length: 4,702 mm (185.1 in)
- Width: 2,035 mm (80.1 in)
- Height: 1,147 mm (45.2 in)
- Curb weight: 1,480 kg (3,263 lb); 1,255 kg (2,767 lb) dry

Chronology
- Predecessor: Ferrari F50
- Successor: LaFerrari

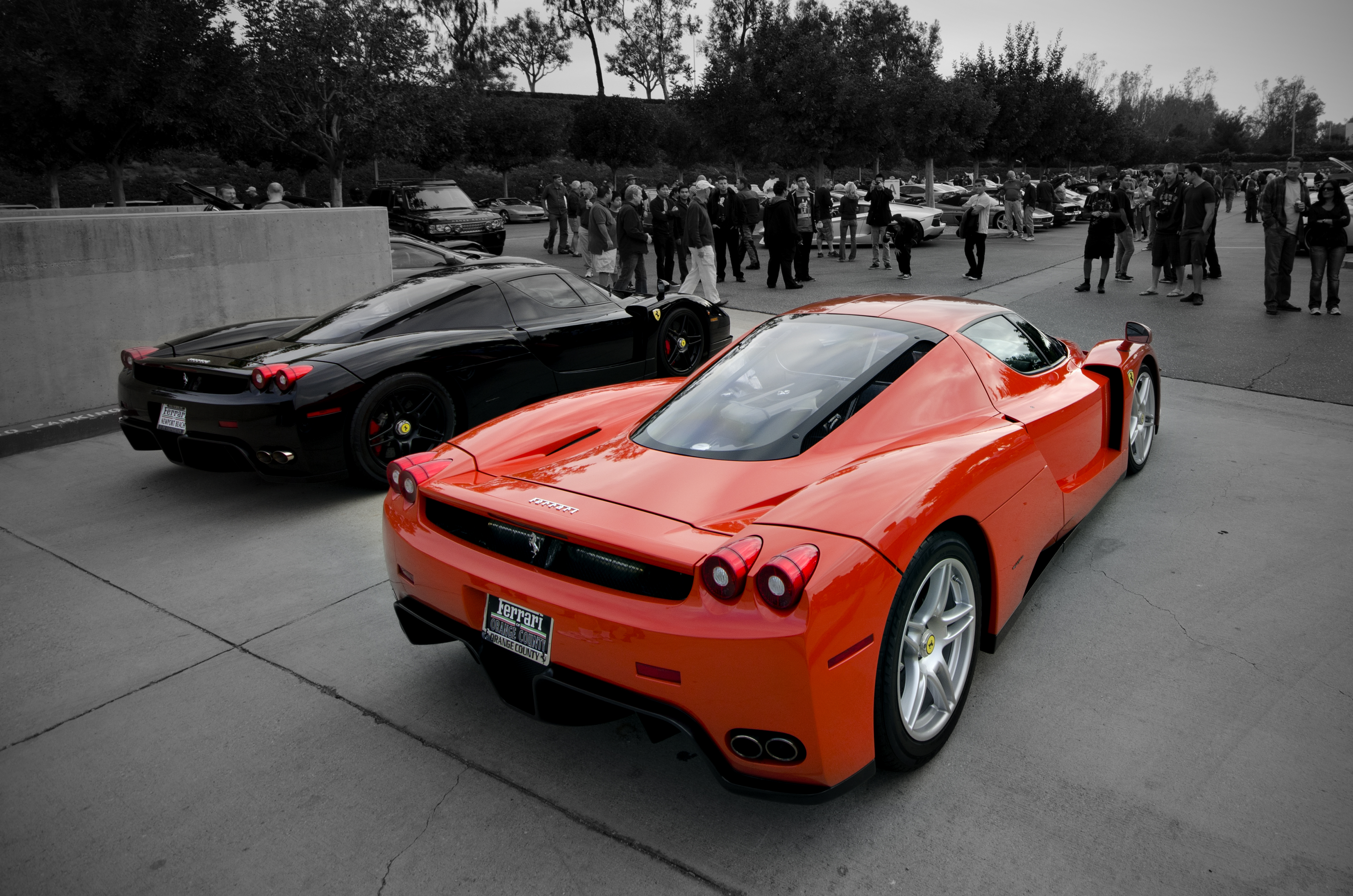
Ferrari Enzo

The Ferrari Enzo (Type F140), officially marketed as Enzo Ferrari, is a mid-engine sports car manufactured by Italian automobile manufacturer Ferrari and named after the company's founder, Enzo Ferrari. It was developed in 2002 using Formula One technology, such as a carbon-fibre body, Formula One-style automated-shift manual transmission, and carbon fibre-reinforced silicon carbide (C/SiC) ceramic composite disc brakes, as well as technologies not allowed in Formula One, such as active aerodynamics. The Enzo's F140 B V12 engine was also the first of a new generation for Ferrari. The Enzo generates substantial amounts of downforce through its front underbody flaps, small adjustable rear spoiler and rear diffuser, which work in conjunction to produce 343 kilograms (756 lb) of downforce at 200 km/h (124 mph) and 775 kilograms (1,709 lb) of downforce at 300 km/h (186 mph), before decreasing to 585 kilograms (1,290 lb) at top speed.

== Production and development ==
The Enzo was designed by Ken Okuyama, the then Pininfarina head of design, and initially announced at the 2002 Paris Motor Show with a limited production run of 399 units. The company sent invitations to existing customers, specifically, those who had previously bought the F40 and F50. In 2004, the 400th production car was built and donated to the Vatican for charity, which was later sold at a Sotheby's auction for US$1.1 million. A total of 498 units were built. Three development mules were built: M1, M2, and M3. Each mule utilised the bodywork of a 348, a model which had been succeeded by two generations of mid-engined V8 sports cars—the F355 and the 360 Modena—by the time the mules were built. The third mule was offered for auction alongside the 400th Enzo in June 2005, selling for €195,500 (US$236,300).

During the project stages, the car was referred to as the Ferrari FX and it was initially believed that Ferrari would continue from the F40 and the F50 and call it the Ferrari F60 once it went on sale. The Enzo name eventually chosen is an homage to company founder Enzo Ferrari.

== Specifications ==
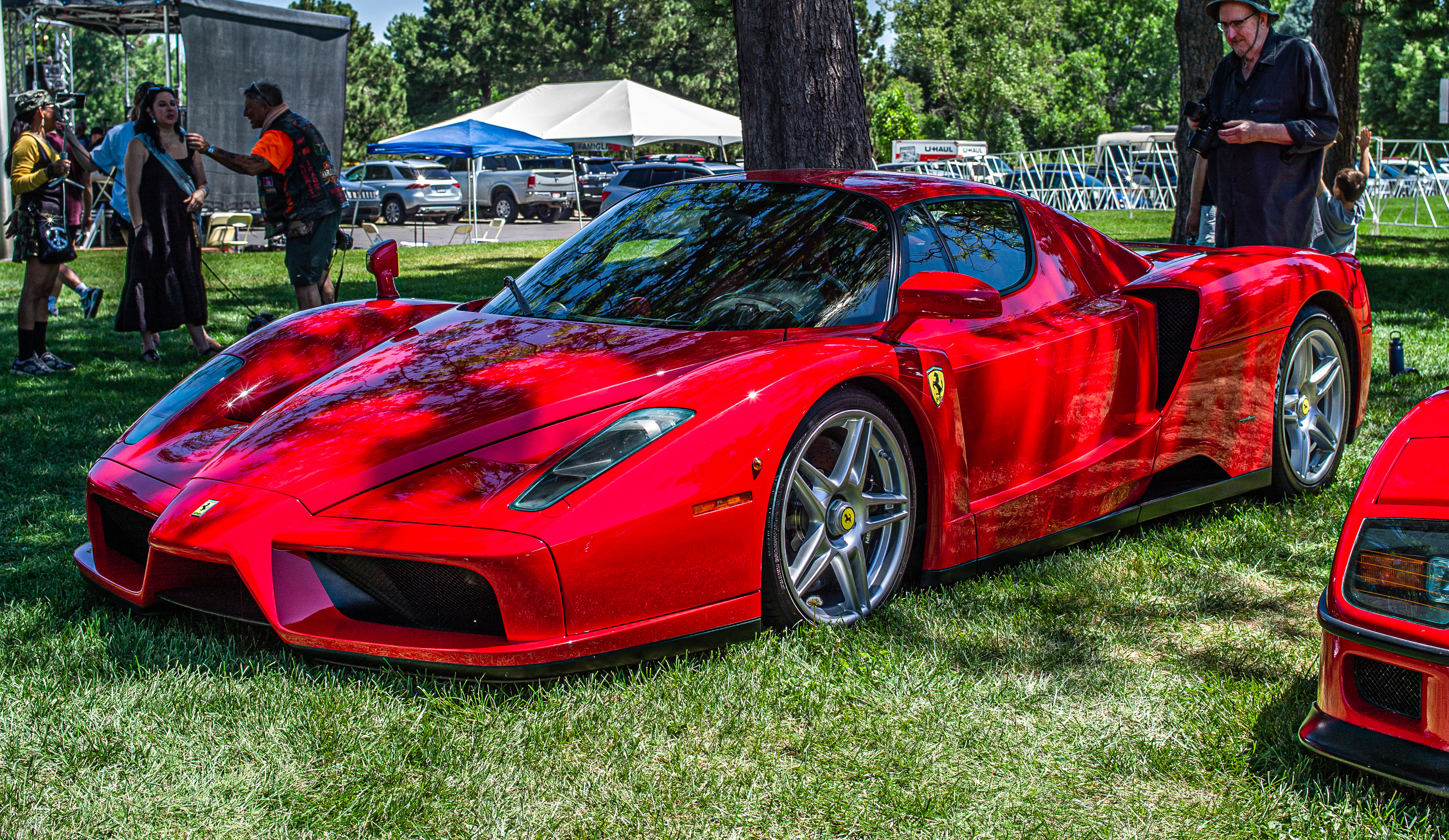
Ferrari Enzo

=== Engine ===
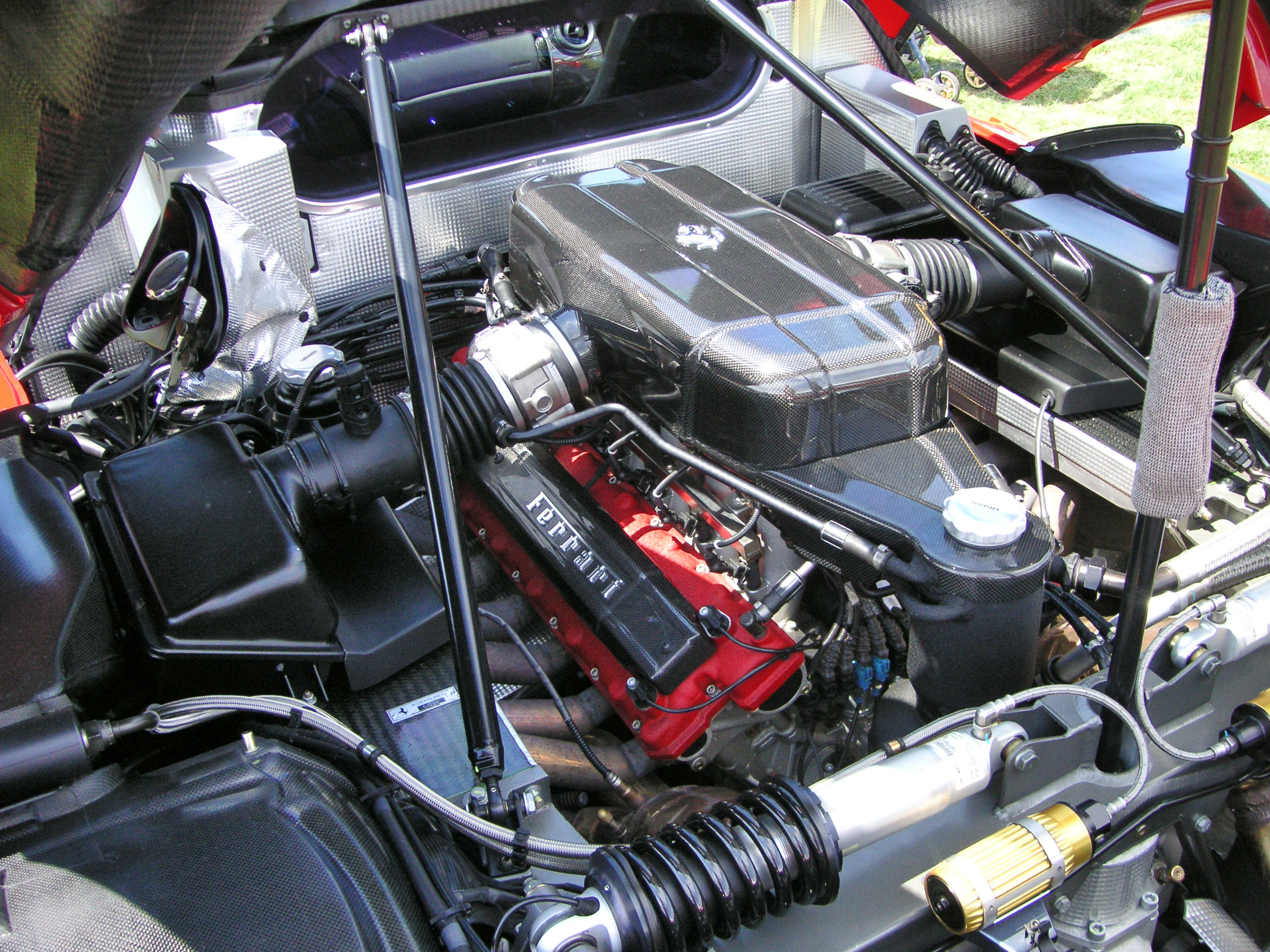
The F140B V12 engine

The engine in the Enzo is longitudinally mounted, and the car has a rear mid-engine, rear-wheel-drive layout with a 44%/56% front/rear weight distribution. The powerplant is Ferrari's F140B naturally aspirated 65° V12 engine with DOHC 4 valves per cylinder, variable valve timing and Bosch Motronic ME7 fuel injection with a displacement of 5,998.80 cc (6.0 L; 366.1 cu in) generating a power output of 660 PS (485 kW; 651 hp) at 7,800 rpm and 657 N⋅m (485 lb⋅ft) of torque at 5,500 rpm. The redline is 8,200 rpm.

=== Suspension, gearbox and brakes ===
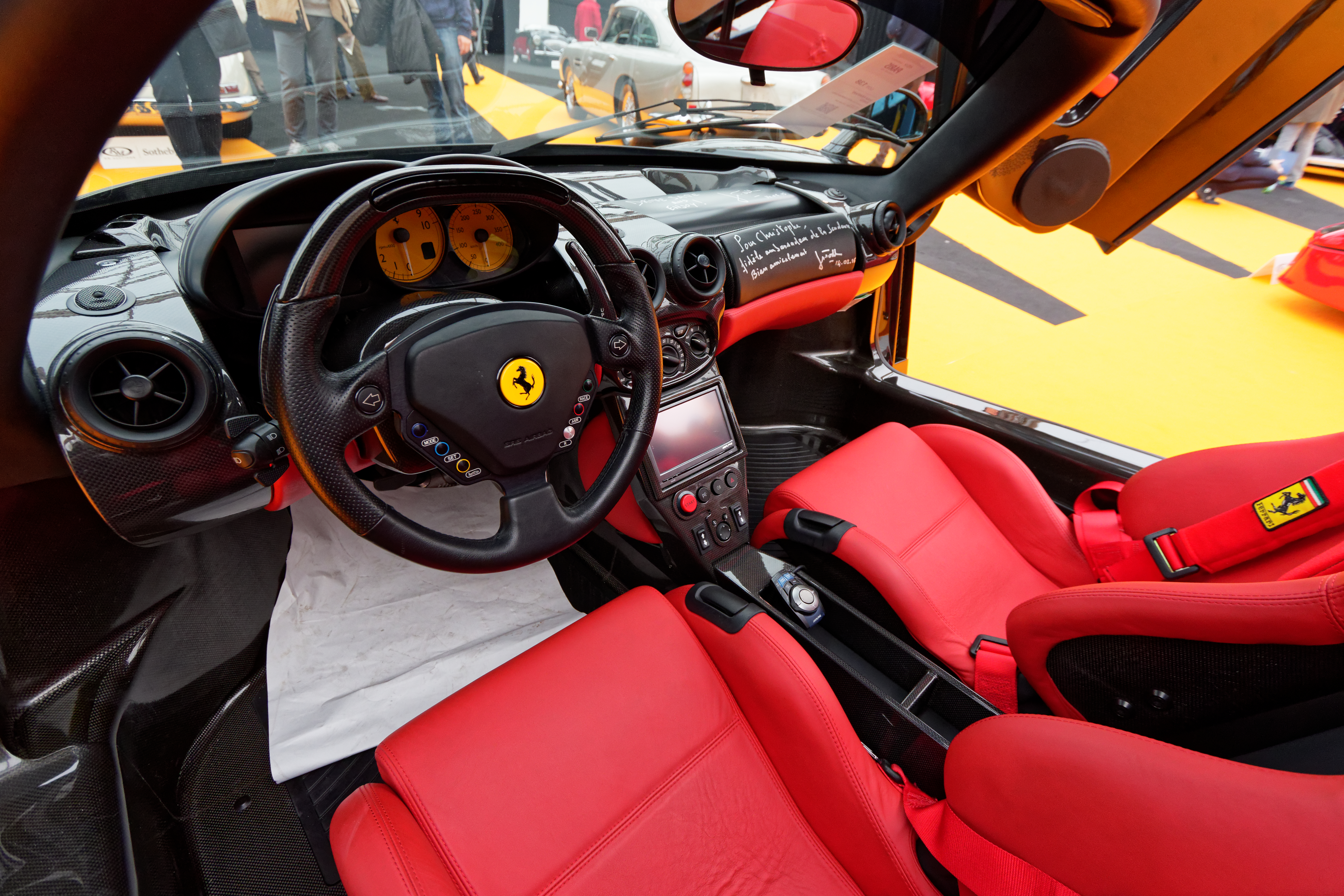
The Ferrari Enzo used the F1 transmission and had a gear shift indicator on the steering wheel telling the driver when to change gears.

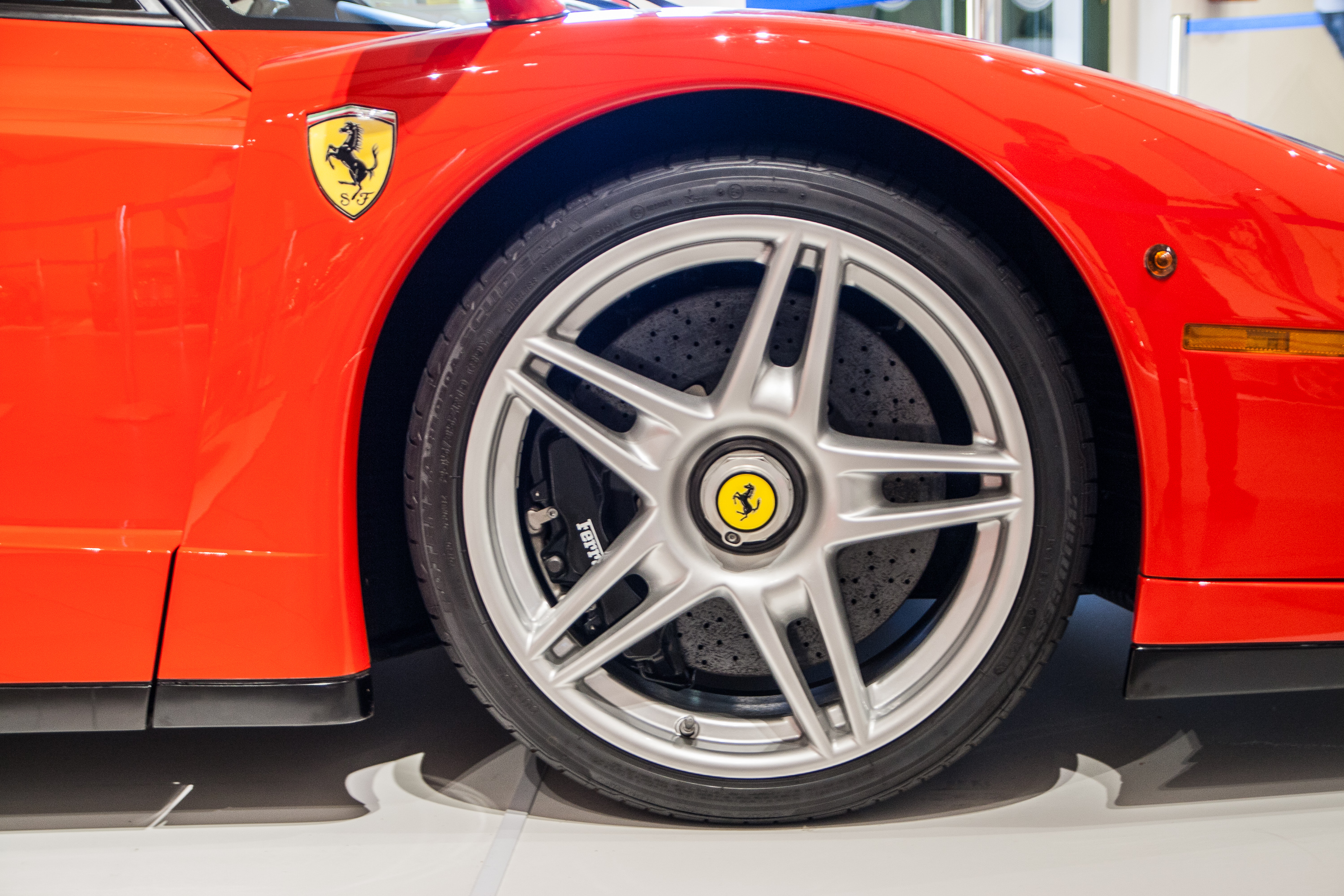
The Ferrari Enzo used carbon-ceramic brake discs, a first for a Ferrari road car.

The Enzo has an automated manual transmission, known as the F1 gearbox, using paddle-shifters to control an automatically actuated electrohydraulic clutch and shifting mechanism, with LED lights on the steering wheel telling the driver when to change gears. The gearbox has a shift time of 150 milliseconds and was built by Graziano Trasmissioni. The transmission was a first-generation "clutchless" design from the late 1990s, and there have been complaints about its abrupt shifting. The Enzo has four-wheel independent suspension with push-rod-actuated shock absorbers, which can be adjusted from the cabin, complemented with anti-roll bars at the front and rear. The Enzo uses 19-inch (482.6 mm) wheels and has 15-inch (381.0 mm) Brembo disc brakes. The wheels are held by a single lug nut and fitted with Bridgestone Potenza Scuderia RE050A tyres.

Gear	1	2	3	4	5	6	Final drive
Ratio	3.15:1	2.18:1	1.57:1	1.19:1	0.94:1	0.76:1	4.1:1

=== Performance ===
The Enzo can accelerate to 97 km/h (60 mph) in 3.14 seconds and can reach 161 km/h (100 mph) in 6.6 seconds. The ¼-mile (~400 m) time is about 11 seconds, on skidpad it has reached 1.05g, and the top speed has been recorded to be as high as 355 km/h (221 mph). It is rated at 34 litres per 100 kilometres (6.9 mpg_{‑US}) in the city, 20 L/100 km (12 mpg_{‑US}) on the highway and 29 L/100 km (8.1 mpg_{‑US}) combined. Evo tested the Enzo on the famed Nordschleife Circuit and ran a 7:25.21 lap time. The Enzo in the test had a broken electronic damper. They also tested it at Bedford Autodrome West circuit, where it recorded a 1:21.3 lap time, which is 1.1 seconds slower than the Porsche Carrera GT, but faster than the Litchfield Type-25. Motor Trend tested the Enzo without the downhill or rollout and it ran 0-60 MPH in 3.3 seconds, with a quarter mile time of 11.1 seconds.

== Accolades ==
In 2004, American magazine Sports Car International named the Ferrari Enzo number three on their list of Top Sports Cars of the 2000s. American magazine Motor Trend Classic named the Enzo as number four in their list of the ten "Greatest Ferraris of all time". The Ferrari Enzo was also described as one of the "Fifty Ugliest Cars of the Past 50 Years", as Bloomberg Businessweek cited its superfluous curves and angles as too flashy, particularly the V-shaped hood, scooped-out doors, and bulbous windshield.

== Other media ==
Before being unveiled at the Paris Motor Show, the show car was flown from Italy to the United States to be filmed in Charlie's Angels: Full Throttle. It was driven on a beach by actress Demi Moore. After filming was complete, the Enzo was flown to France to be at the Motor Show.

== Gallery ==
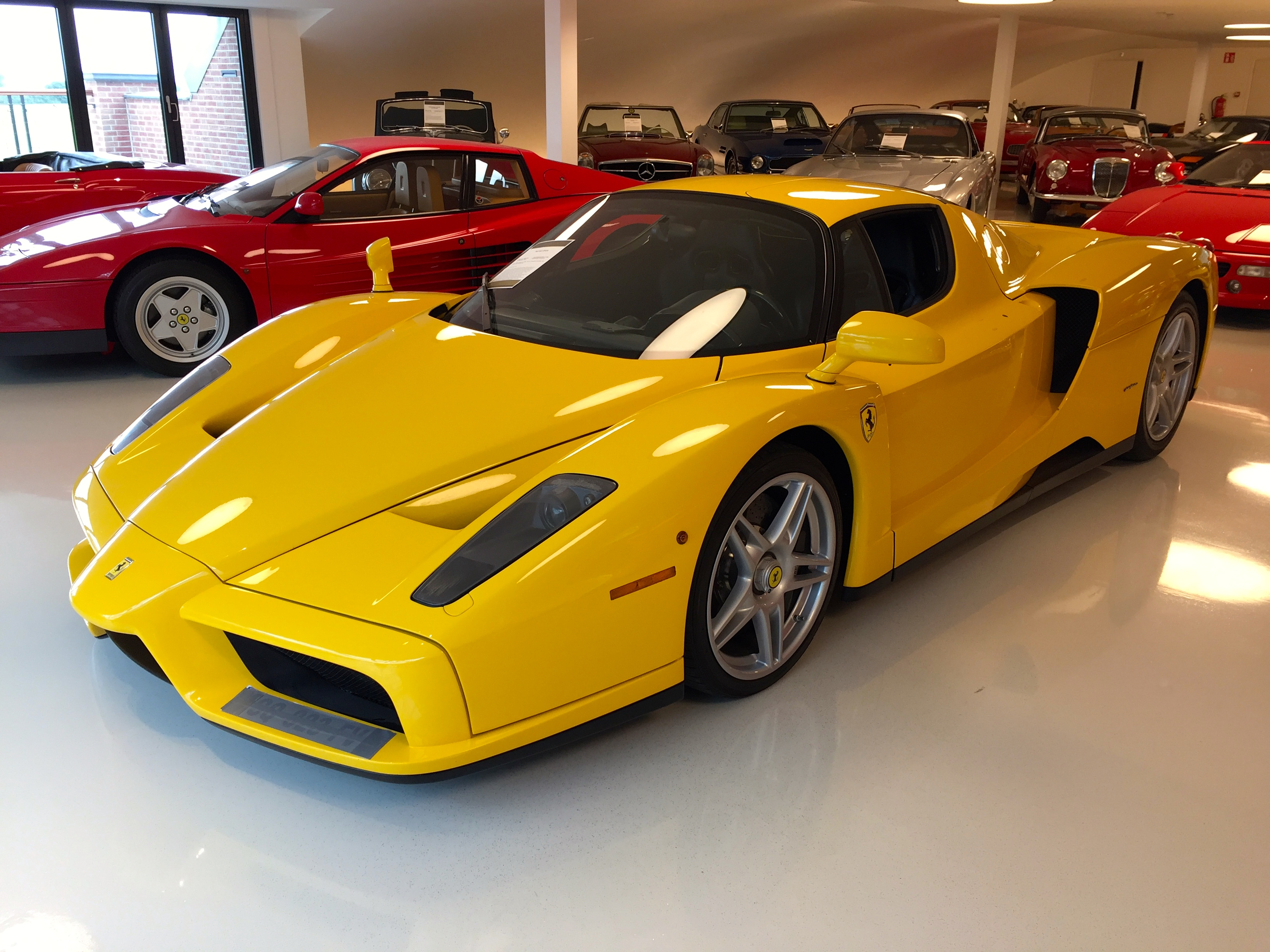
Giallo Modena

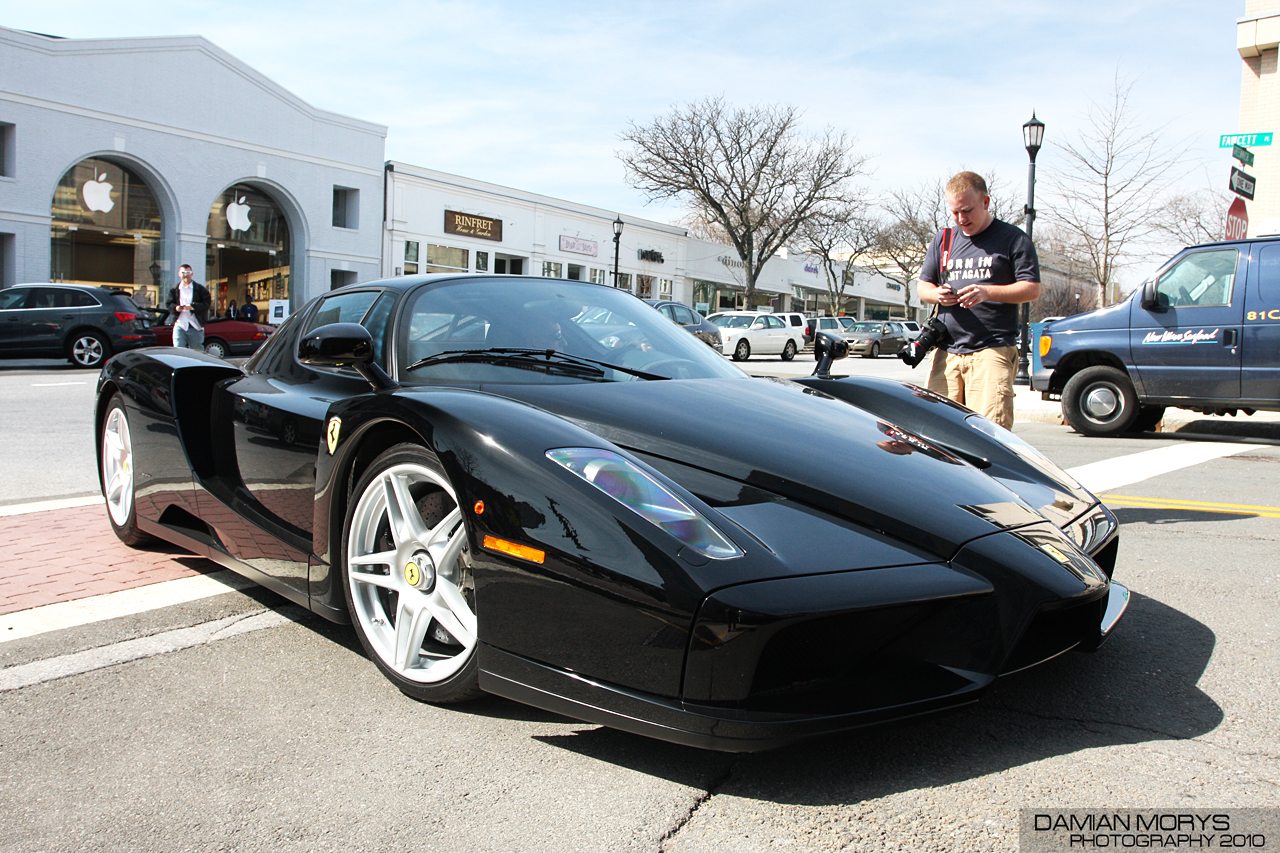
Nero

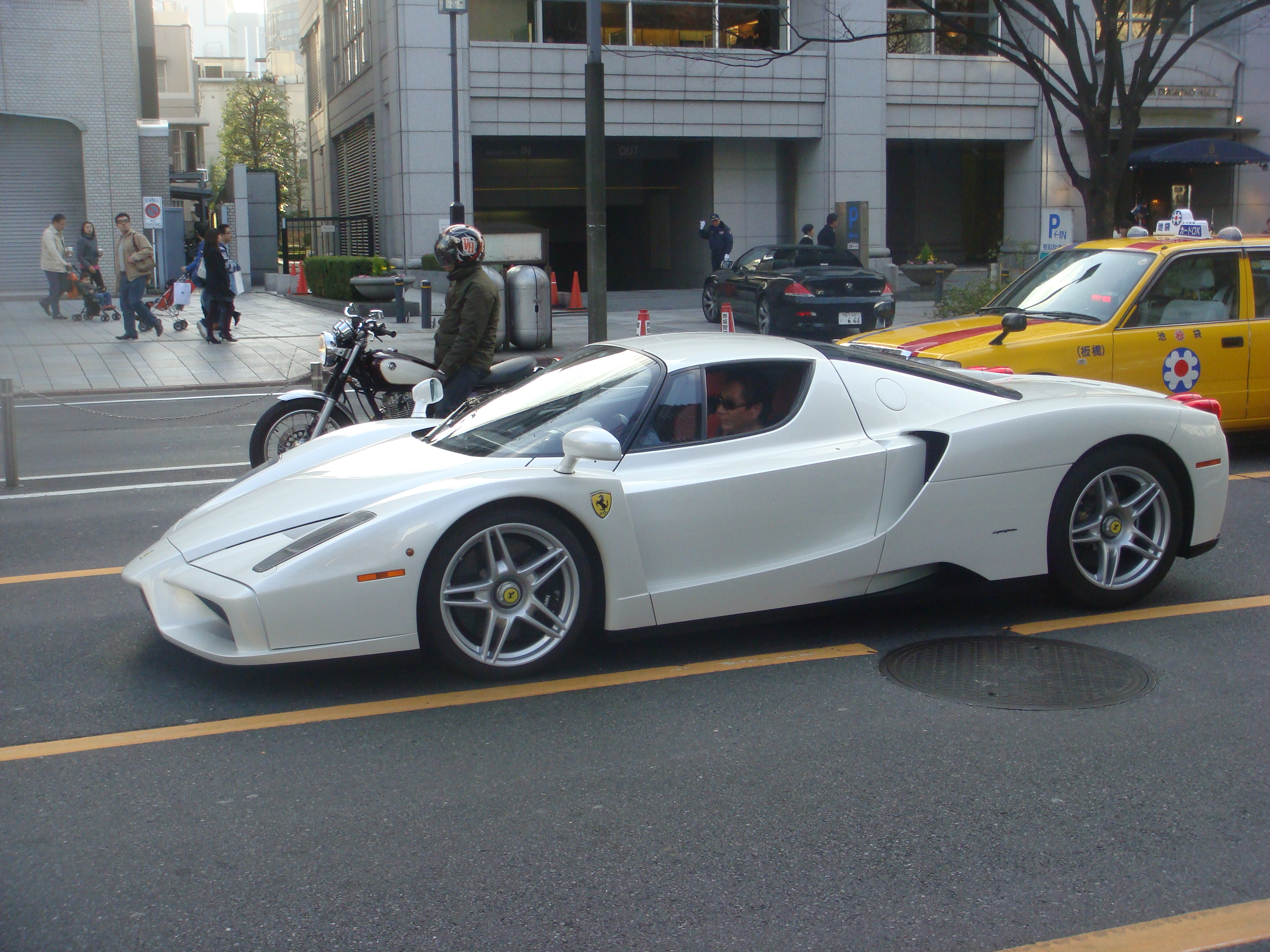
Bianco Fuji

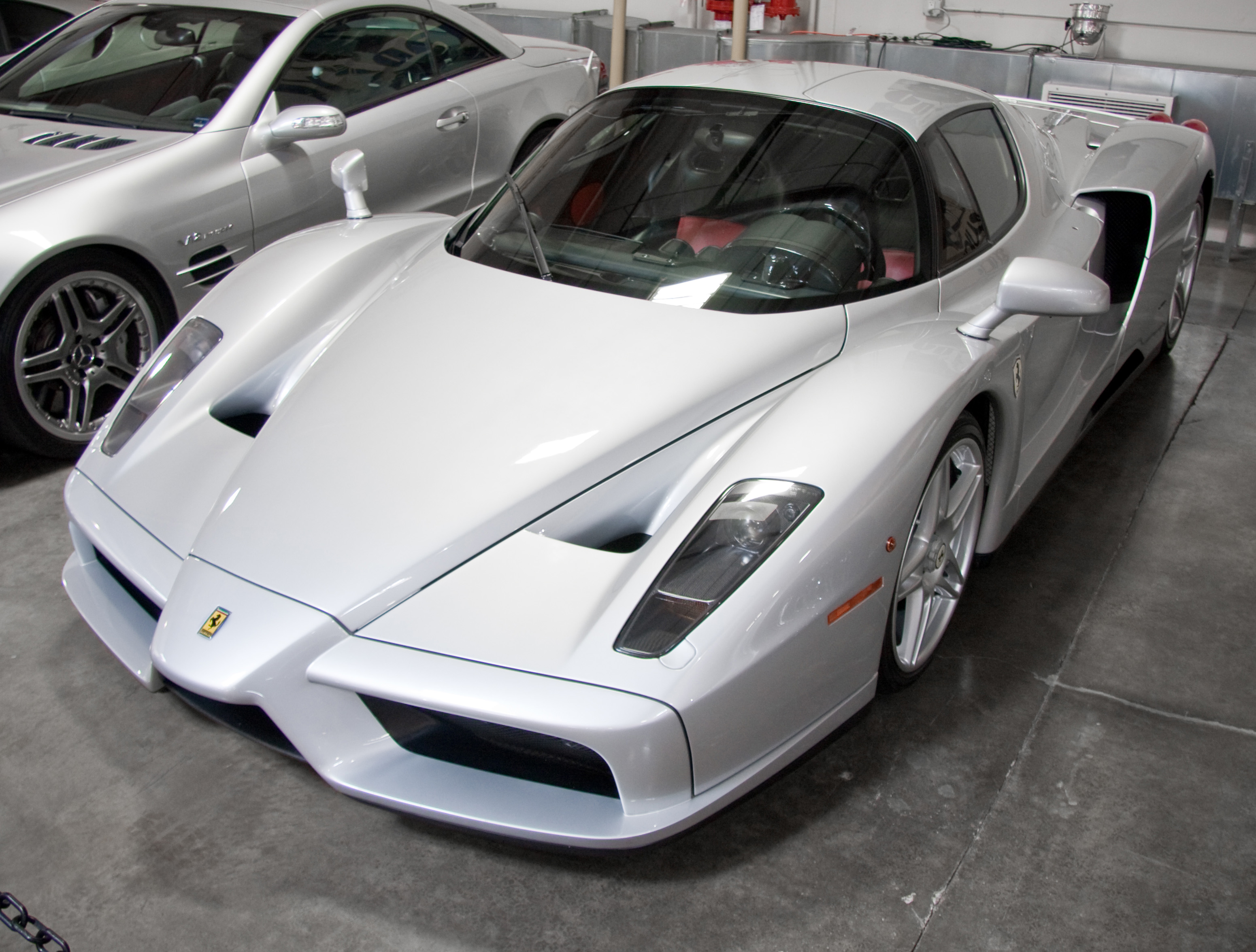
Argento Nurburgring

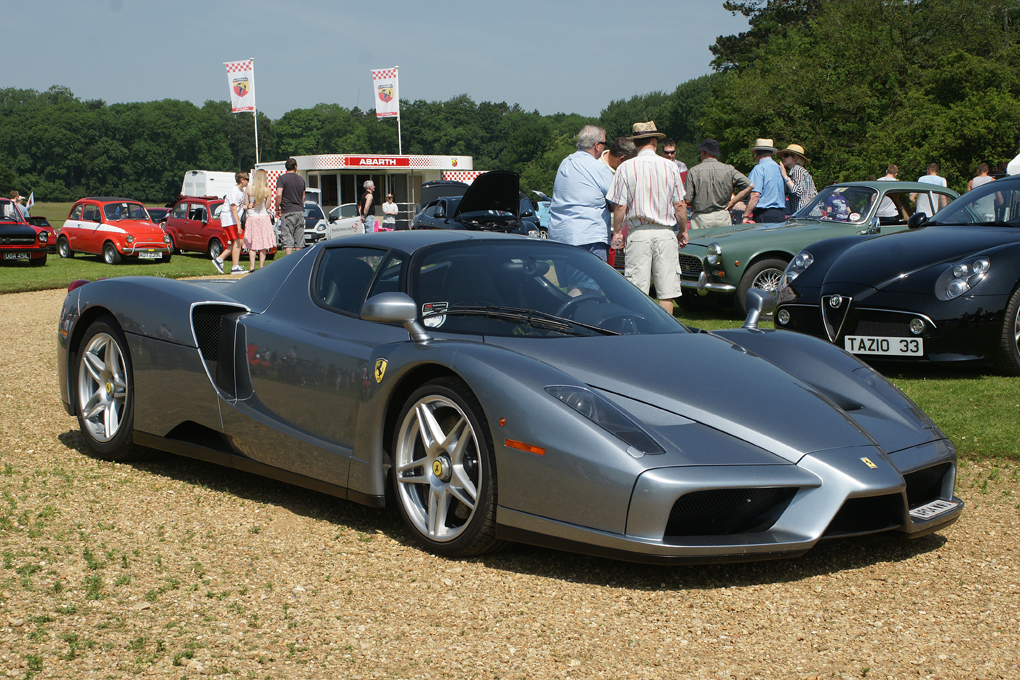
Grigio Titanio

== Related cars ==
=== Ferrari FXX ===
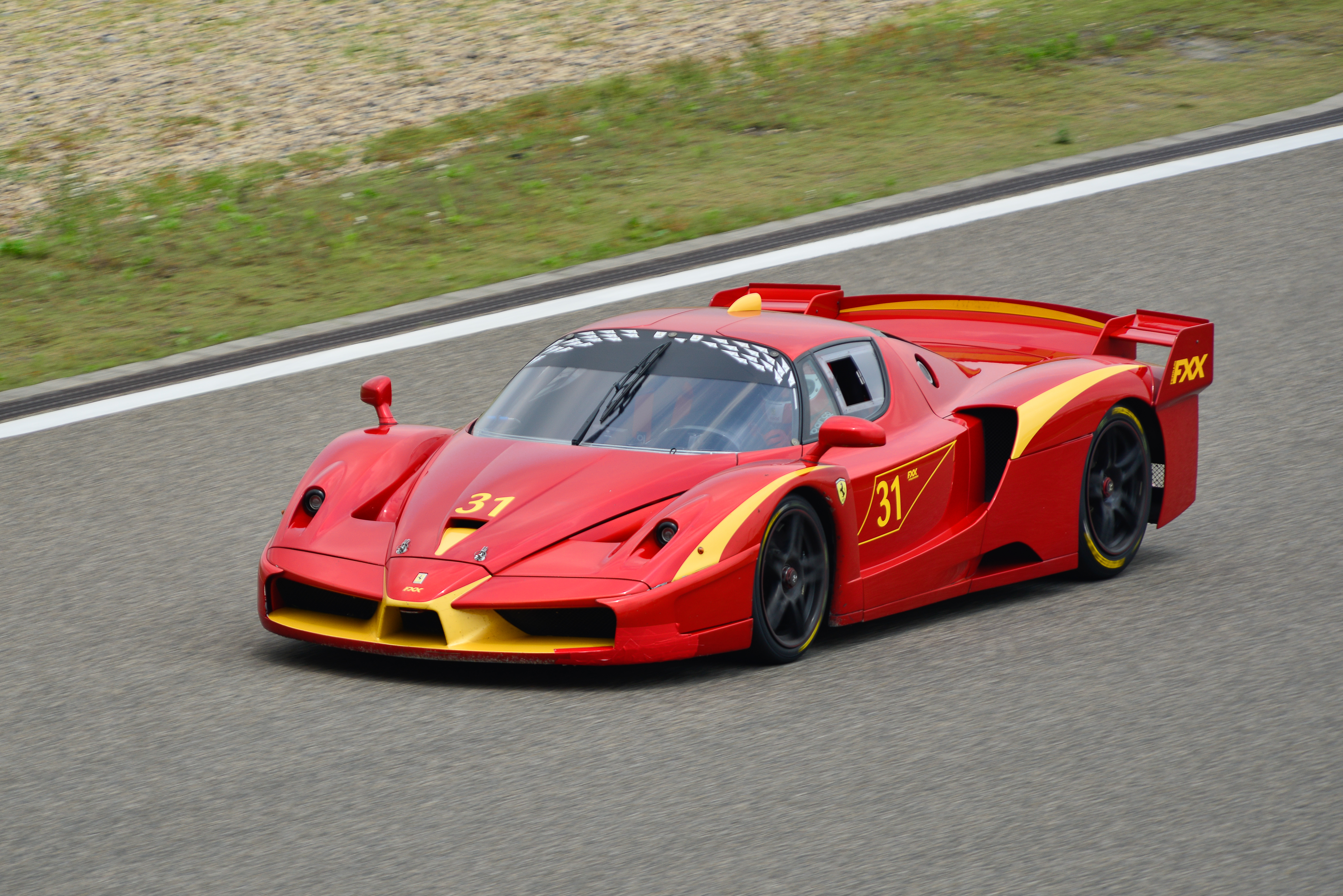
Ferrari FXX

Ferrari decided to use some of the technology developed for the Enzo in a small-scale program to get more feedback from certain customers for use in future car design as well as their racing program. The core of this program is the Ferrari FXX, introduced in 2005. It was loosely based on the Enzo's design with a highly tuned 6.3-liter version of the Enzo's engine generating a power output of approximately 800 PS (588 kW; 789 hp). The gearbox is specially developed for the car as well as the tires (custom-designed for this car by Bridgestone) along with the brakes (developed by Brembo). In addition, the car is fitted with extensive data-recording and telemetry systems to allow Ferrari to record the car's behavior. This information is used by Ferrari to develop their future sports cars. The FXX can do 0 to 97 km/h (0 to 60 mph) in 2.8 seconds.

Like the Enzo, the car was sold to specially selected existing clients of Ferrari only. The initial price was €1.3 million. The car was available for the client's use on various circuits as arranged by Ferrari and also during private track sessions. A famous example of this is when Ferrari allowed Top Gear to send it around their test track in 2009; however, as Ben Collins (then portraying The Stig) was not a specially selected client, Michael Schumacher was selected to wear the white race suit. In the FXX, he set a then new lap record of 1:10.7, a record which was then immediately taken off as the car is not expected to be suitable for road use. The Ferrari FXX program was continued until 2009 with the Ferrari FXX Evoluzione. Ferrari then followed up with the new 599XX a year later.

=== Ferrari P4/5 by Pininfarina ===
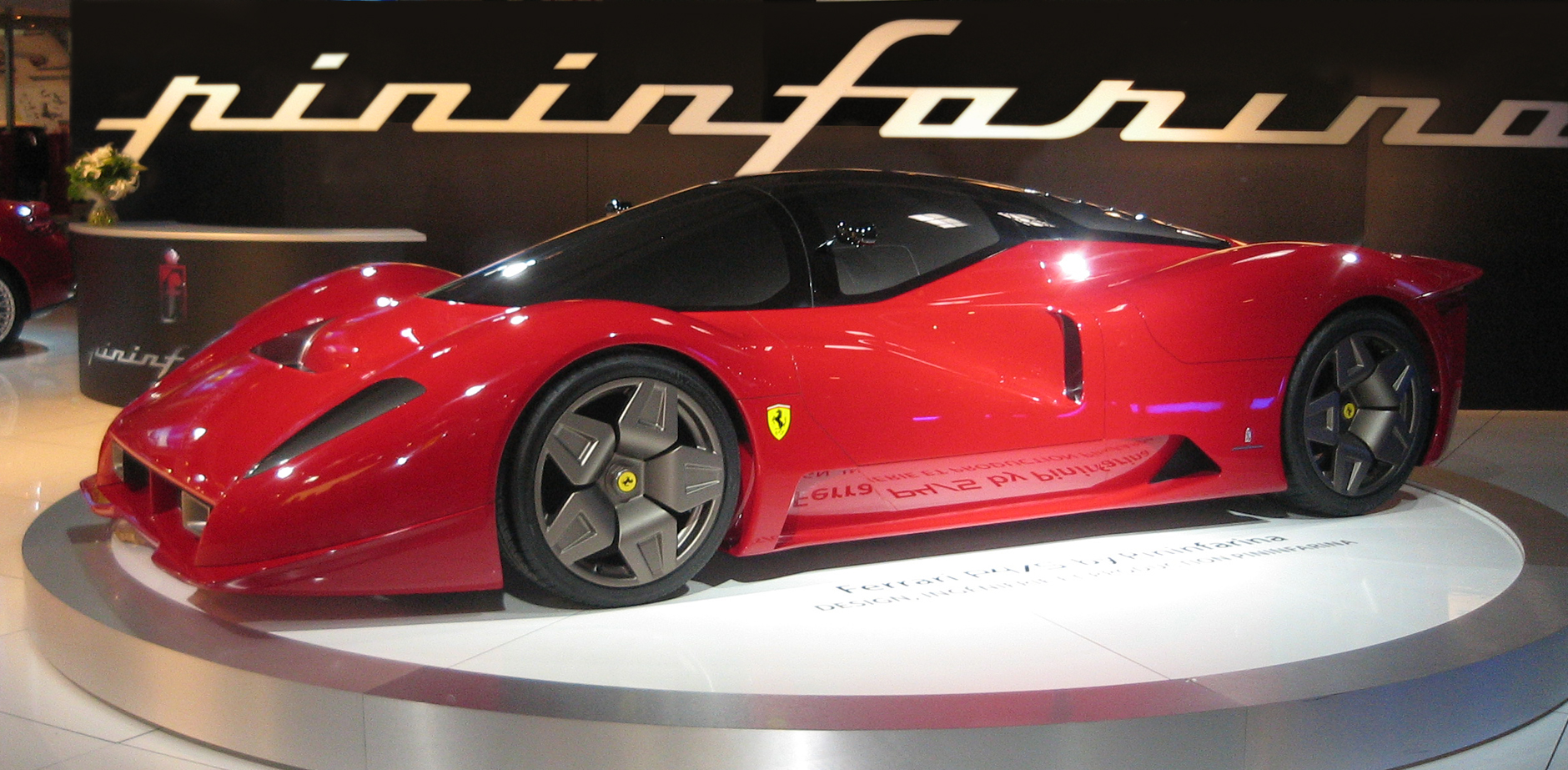
Ferrari P4/5

Italian design studio Pininfarina had wanted to make a special one-off sports car based on the Enzo Ferrari flagship and was looking for a backer. After sending out feelers to its clients, American Ferrari collector James Glickenhaus eventually agreed to back the project by commissioning his car as a modern homage to great Ferrari sports racing cars such as the 330 P3/4, 512 S, 312 P, and 333 SP on the last unregistered U.S.-spec Enzo chassis. The car was named the Ferrari P4/5 by Pininfarina, and retains the Enzo's drivetrain and vehicle identification number. The car was unveiled at the 2006 Pebble Beach Concours d'Elegance and appeared in the September issue of Car and Driver. After its unveiling at Pebble Beach, the P4/5 returned to Europe for high-speed testing, press days, and an appearance at the Paris Auto Show in September 2006. Upon seeing the P4/5, the then Ferrari president Luca di Montezemolo felt that the car deserved to be officially badged as a Ferrari and along with Andrea Pininfarina and James Glickenhaus agreed that its official name would be "Ferrari P 4/5 by Pininfarina". Ted West wrote an article in Car and Driver about how this came to be "The Beast of Turin".

=== Maserati MC12 ===
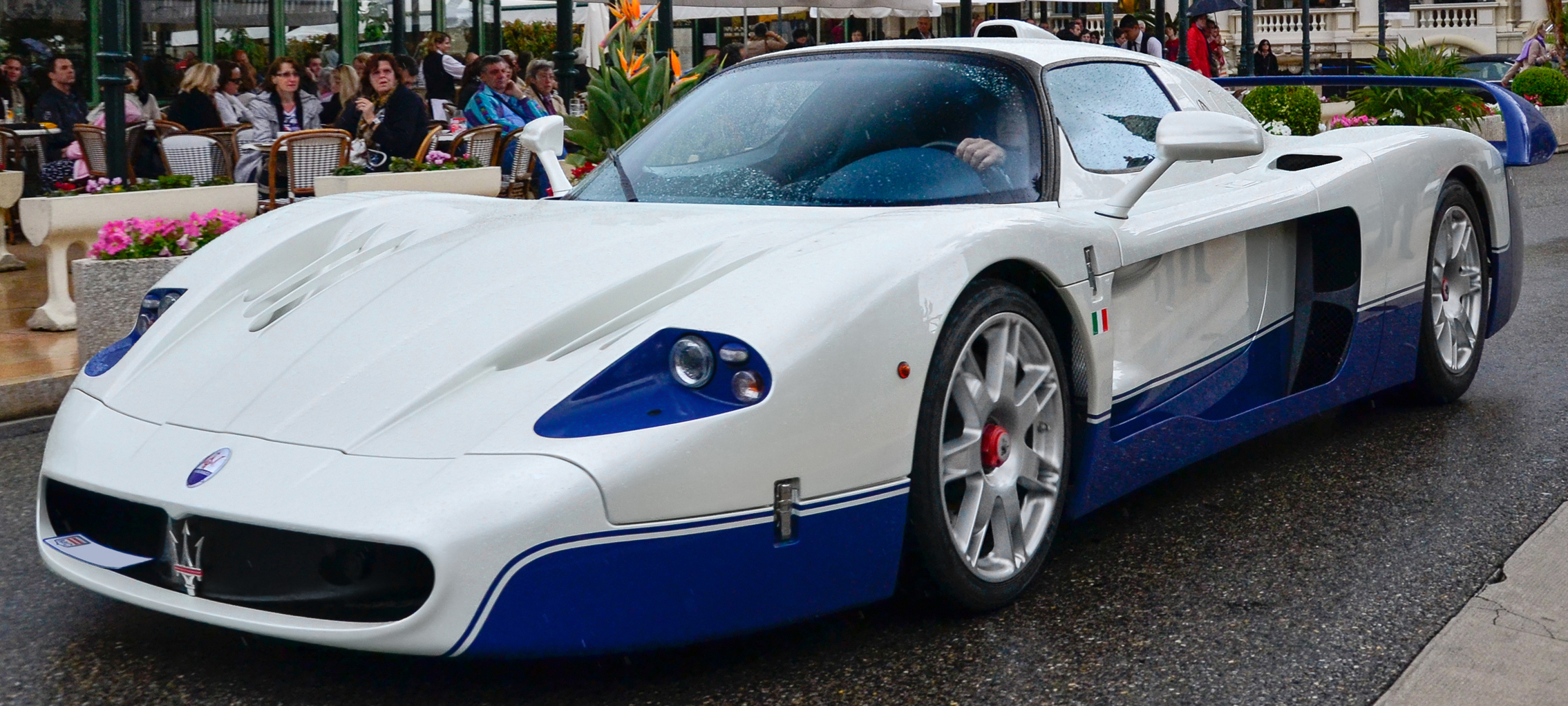
Maserati MC12

The Maserati MC12 is a two-seat mid-engine sports car that is a derivative of the Enzo Ferrari developed by Maserati while under the control of Ferrari. It was developed specifically to be homologated for racing in the FIA GT Championship, with a minimum requirement of 25 road versions to be produced before the car could be allowed to compete. Maserati built 50 units, all of which were presold to selected customers. A track-only variation, the MC12 Corsa was later developed, similar to the Ferrari FXX. The Maserati MC12 has the same engine, chassis, and gearbox as the Enzo but the only externally visible component from the Enzo is the windshield. The MC12 is slower in acceleration (0–100 km/h or 0–62 mph being achieved in 3.8 seconds), and has a lower top speed of 330 km/h (205 mph) due to engine tuning and less drag coefficient (due to a sharper nose and smoother curves) than the Enzo Ferrari; however, the MC12 has lapped race tracks faster than the Enzo before, specifically on the UK motoring show Top Gear, and the Nurbürgring Nordschleife. This could be attributed to the MC12's Pirelli P-Zero Corsa tires which have more grip than the Enzo's Bridgestone Scuderia tires.

=== Maserati Birdcage 75th ===
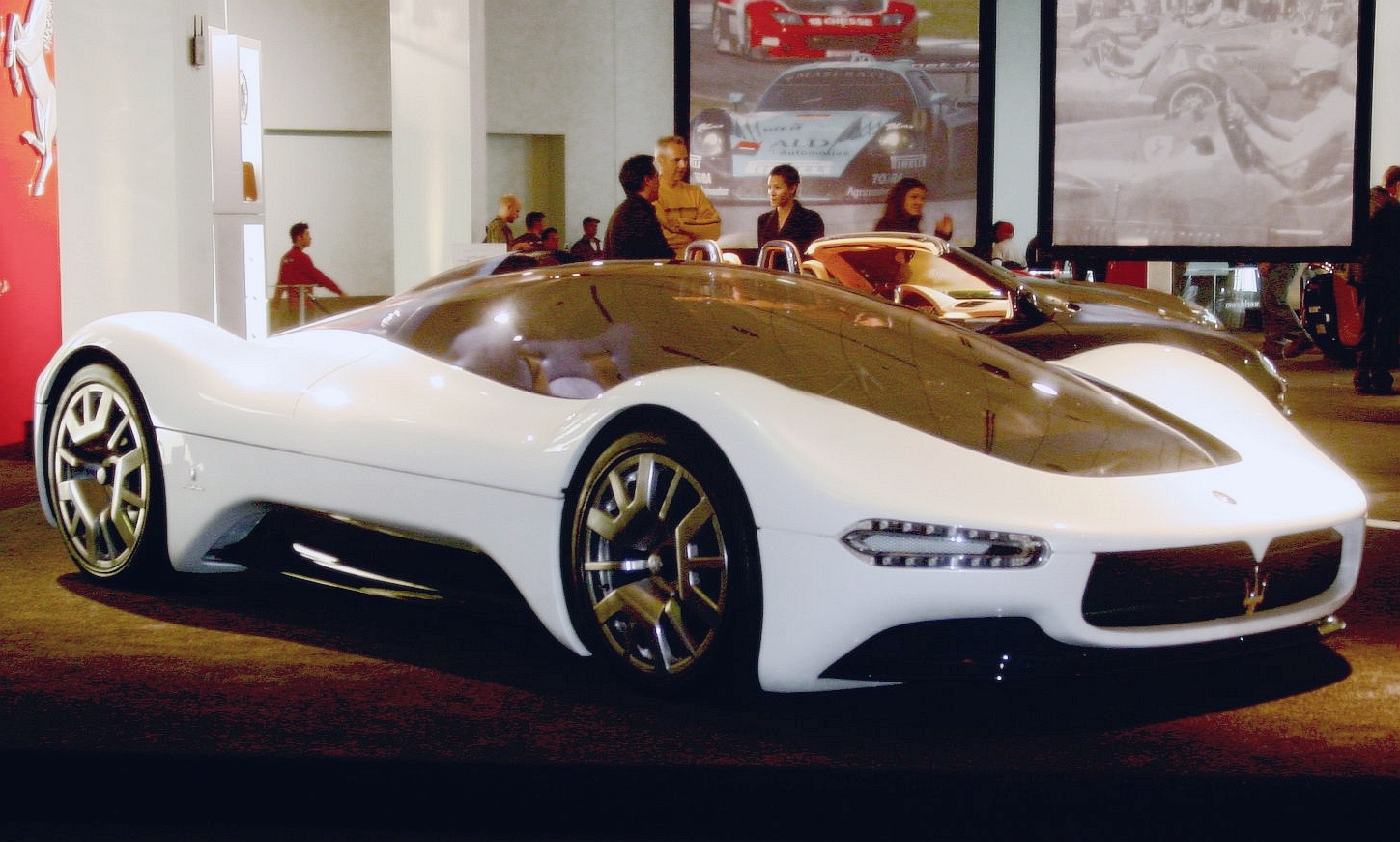
The Maserati Birdcage 75th at the 2006 LA Auto Show

The Maserati Birdcage 75th is a concept car created by automobile manufacturer Maserati and designed by Pininfarina, as a celebration of Pininfarina's 75th anniversary, and was introduced at the 2005 Geneva Auto Show. It is an evolution of the MC12 and draws inspiration from the Maserati Tipo Birdcages of the 1960s. There were rumors that Maserati was going to produce the car as the MC13, for which Maserati confirmed to have plans, but they were cancelled due to problems with Pininfarina giving Maserati total control over the design of the car.

=== Maserati MC12 Versione Corse ===
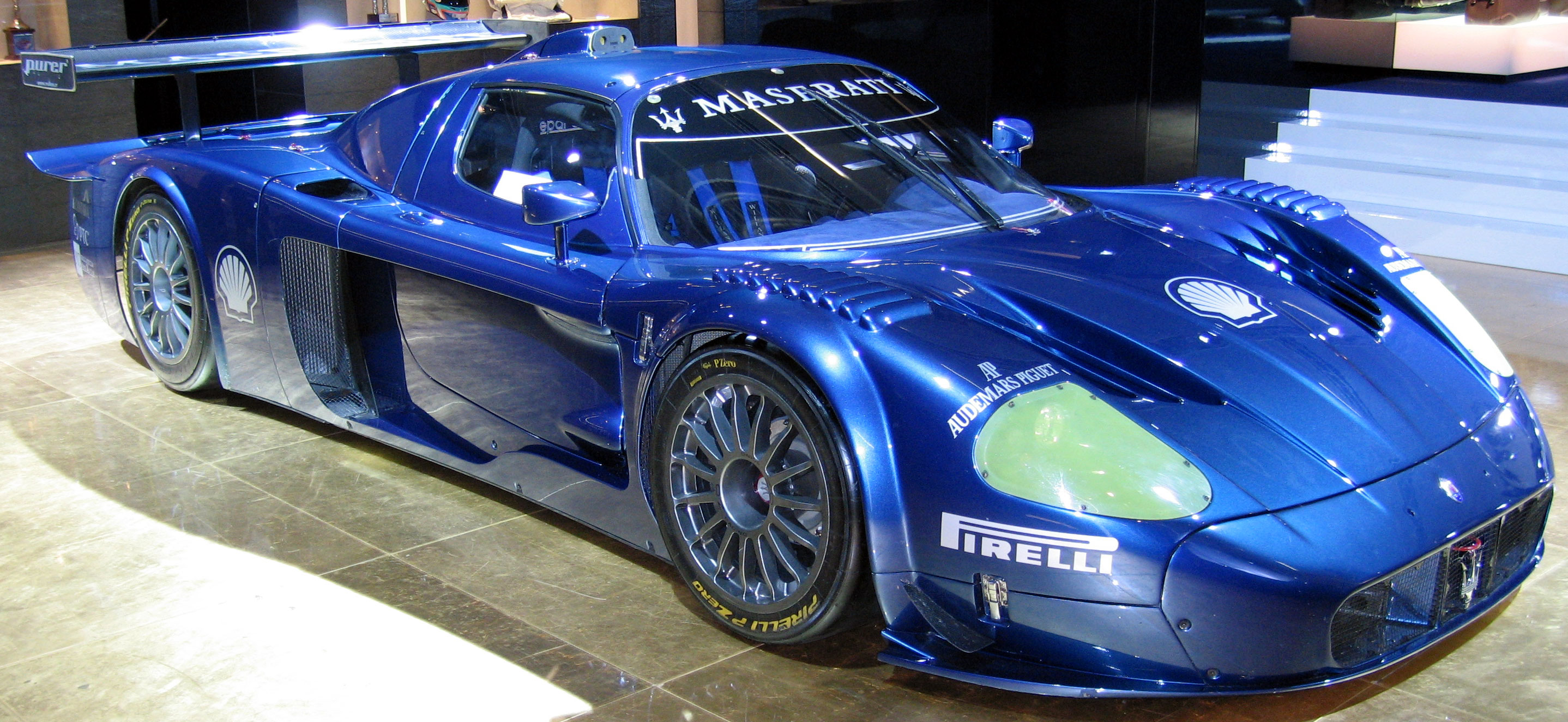
Maserati MC12 Versione Corse at the IAA 2007

The Maserati MC12 Versione Corse is a variant of the MC12 intended for racetrack use. In contrast to the race version of the MC12, of which street-legal versions were produced for homologation purposes, the MC12 Versione Corse is intended for private use, albeit restricted to the track, as the Versione Corse's modifications make it illegal to drive on the road.

The Versione Corse was developed directly from the MC12 GT1, which won the 2005 FIA GT Manufacturers Cup. The car was released in mid-2006, "in response to the customer demand to own the MC12 racing car and fueled by the growth in track days, where owners can drive their cars at high speeds in the safety of a race track", as stated by Edward Butler, General Manager for Maserati in Australia and New Zealand. In similar fashion to the Ferrari FXX, although the owners are private individuals, Maserati is responsible for the storage, upkeep, and maintenance of the cars, and they are only driven on specially organized track days. Unlike the FXX, the MC12 Corsa is not intended for research and development, and is used only for entertainment. A single MC12 Versione Corse has been modified by its owner to make it street-legal the conversion was carried out by German tuning firm Edo Competition.

Only twelve MC12 Versione Corses were sold to selected customers, each of whom paid €1 million (US$1.47 million) for the privilege. Another three vehicles were produced for testing and publicity purposes. The Versione Corse shares its engine with the MC12 GT1; the power plant produces 755 PS (555 kW; 745 hp) at 8,000 rpm, 122 PS (90 kW; 120 hp) more than the road-legal MC12. The MC12 Versione Corse shares the GT1's shortened nose, which was a requirement for entry into the American Le Mans Series. The car was available in a single standard colour, named "Blue Victory", though the car's paint could be customized upon request. The MC12 Versione Corse possesses steel/carbon racing brakes, but is not fitted with an anti-lock braking system.

=== Ferrari Millechili ===
Millechili, Italian for one thousand (mille) kilograms (chili), is the code name for a prototype sports car to be manufactured by Ferrari. It was a lightweight version of the Enzo Ferrari that would borrow features from Formula One race cars, using the F430's aluminium space frame on a 104.3-inch (2,650 mm) wheelbase. The hybrid power train utilising a V10 engine used in the car would exceed 610 PS (449 kW; 602 hp). The car was mainly a technological concept with no intention of production. The Millechili was developed in collaboration with the University of Modena and Reggio Emilia, faculty of Mechanical Engineering. Millechili Lab is a cross-project in which students are working on light-weight car design.

=== Ferrari FXX Evoluzione ===
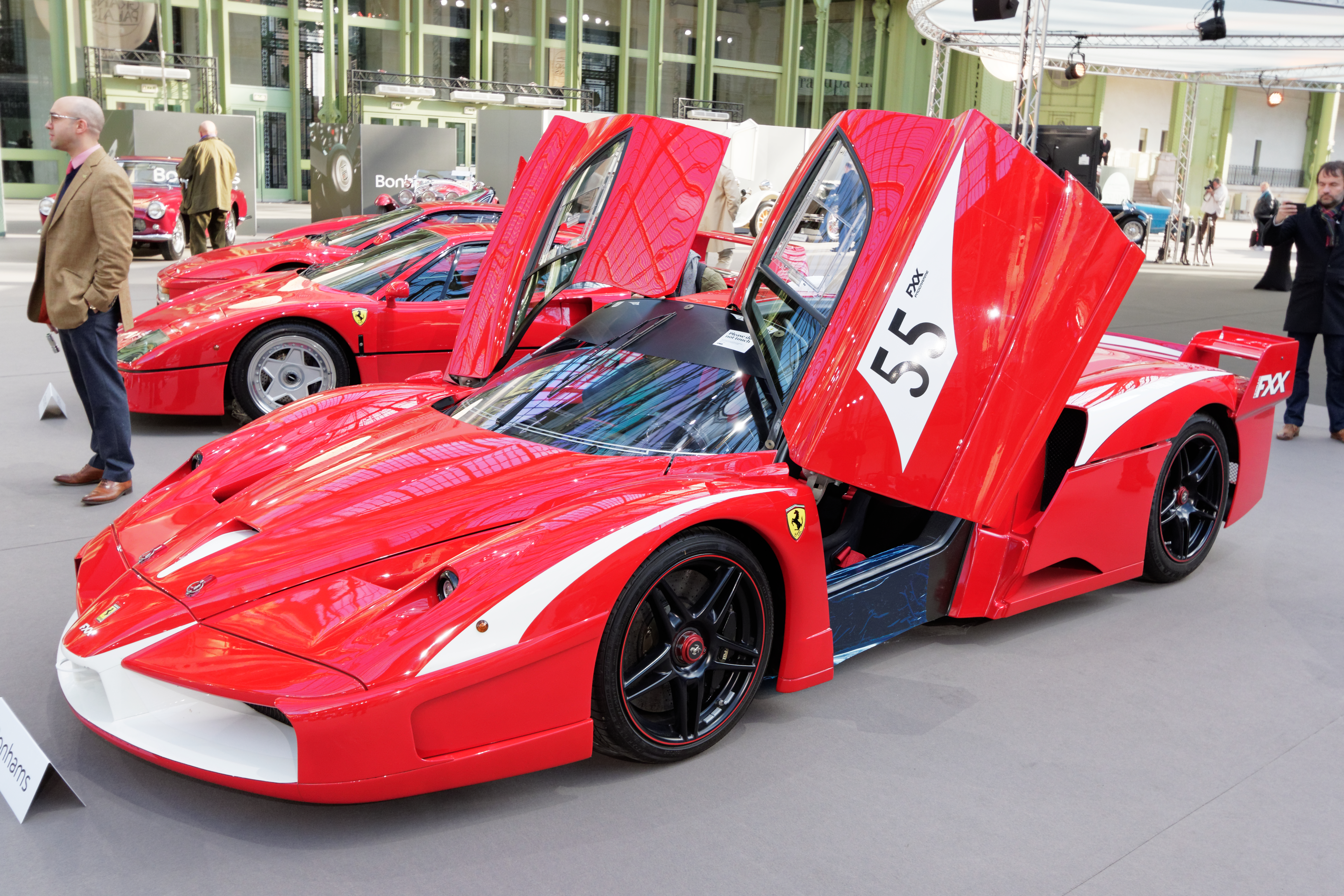
Ferrari FXX Evoluzione

The Ferrari FXX program continued until 2009. The car continued to be improved under the Evoluzione kit, which continually adjusts specifics to generate more power and quicker gear changes, along with reducing the car's aerodynamic drag. The V12 engine under the Evoluzione kit generates 860 PS (633 kW; 848 hp) at 9,500 rpm and enables the car to accelerate from 0 to 100 km/h (0 to 62 mph) in 2.5 seconds. Certain changes were made to the gearbox in order to reduce the shift time to 60 milliseconds per shift, a reduction of 20 milliseconds over the original FXX. The car also underwent aerodynamic changes and improvements to the traction control system were made in order to make the car more responsive around the track. The modifications also allow the Evoluzione to reach a top speed of 365 km/h (227 mph).
