= Edmonton Aviators =

Canadian soccer team

- Full name: Edmonton Aviators Soccer Club
- Nickname: Aviators
- Founded: 2003 (as Edmonton Aviators)
- Dissolved: 2004 (as Edmonton F.C.)
- Stadium: Commonwealth Stadium; Clarke Stadium
- Owner: Edmonton Professional Soccer Limited (EPSL); United Soccer Leagues
- Coach: Ross Ongaro
- League: USL A-League

The Edmonton Aviators were a soccer club based in Edmonton, Alberta, Canada. The club was founded in 2003 as a member of the United Soccer League's A-League and folded after playing only one season in 2004. Midway through the season, with the club in financial trouble, the league took it over to save it from folding. The renamed Edmonton F.C. only lasted until the end of the year.

== History ==
Expectations that Edmonton could support an A-League team were high, as the city had recently hosted the inaugural FIFA U-20 Women's World Championship at Commonwealth Stadium to tremendous success and similarly had success in hosting a number of the Canadian men's international games.

The group that brought the Aviators to Edmonton claimed that they were in it for the long haul, believing that they could keep the team in Edmonton for three years at a minimum, offering both men's and women's soccer to the city of Edmonton. However, the owners were planning for average crowds of 11,000 at Commonwealth Stadium, which some members of the local press held as unrealistic. This would have placed the Aviators, a mere expansion team, near the top of the A-League in attendance. On April 29, 2004, they announced their men's roster, including former Drillers Kurt Bosch, Rick Titus, Nikola Vignjevic, Eric Munoz, and Sipho Sibiya, as well as a number of highly regarded local players such as U-20 National Team player Chris Lemire. To round out the roster, internationals Claudio Salinas, Jaime Lopresti, and Jose Luis Campi were added. There was great hope and optimism for the local team's success.

=== Franchise failure ===
The team was dogged by a number of problems:

According to the local press, one of the main problems was the venue. Commonwealth Stadium was the home of the Canadian national soccer teams, but with a seating capacity over 60,000 people, the smaller crowds were utterly dwarfed by the large stadium. Rent was extremely high, and the Edmonton Eskimos had priority with Commonwealth's facilities. As a result, the Aviators were constantly restricted in what they could do at Commonwealth. Smaller Clarke Stadium was just across the street, but the Aviators did not move there until late in the season. Also, as a result of the venue choice, the Aviators were unsuccessful at getting weekend dates for their games. Only 3 out of 11 matches were scheduled for the weekend, owing to previous bookings for the Edmonton Eskimos, the local CFL football team, and the international rugby tournament, the Churchill Cup.

Moreover, the men's team had the worst performance in the league, as might be expected for a new team, but still to the displeasure of Edmonton sports fans. The team's performance was not helped by difficulties between the players and the team's administration. Rick Titus, one of the veteran players, encountered some friction between him and the former president Wylie Stafford, through to head coach Ross Ongaro, and on down to several teammates. According to the Edmonton Sun (July 4, 2004), the centre of this dispute was the requirement that approximately half of the team had to consist of local players. As a consequence, Titus was released by the Aviators in mid-season, eventually joining the Toronto Lynx. Shortly thereafter, Titus attempted to amend this area of difficulty but as was reported, Joe Petrone, then heading the club, maintained that the damage was done and that the player was not going to be accepted back. In the same atmosphere, as noted in the Edmonton Sun (July 6, 2004), Waldemar Dutra, a promising local goal-scorer who trained with the Aviators, left for Schweinfurt, a Third Division team in Germany.

Further, as cited in the Edmonton Journal (July 20, 2004, p. A4), the business plan of the team's owners was a source of some concern for local soccer officials. As noted in the press, with lower attendance than expected and higher costs than anticipated, the owners returned their franchise on August 15, after it failed to meet its revenue expectations for the three months it existed. The club's ownership group, Edmonton Professional Soccer (EPSL) Ltd admitted to the league that the business plan, put in place at the start of the franchise, was flawed. With ticket sales much closer to the league average of 3000 people, the EPSL was suffering large operating losses. The club's 19-person ownership refused to provide immediate cash injection to keep both the men and women's teams afloat, and chose to see the franchise fold. As a consequence, the league took over operation of the Aviators, renaming the team Edmonton F.C. as the old owners took the rights to the Aviators name with them. The team was run on a shoestring budget, transferring away what few skilled players the Aviators had acquired and moving to the much smaller Foote Field where, incidentally, attendance was noticeably better.

The team was folded by the league after the 2004 season. After the club's folding was announced, it was speculated by some in the local press that the team could have worked if a better business model was arranged from the outset.

The team's only coach was Ross Ongaro. Steve O'Boyle The Team 1260 now TSN 1260 would announce games before the franchise's demise. copyrighted

== Players ==
=== Final squad ===
vs. Toronto Lynx, 26 August 2004

Note: Flags indicate national team as defined under FIFA eligibility rules; some limited exceptions apply. Players may hold more than one non-FIFA nationality.

No.	Pos.	Nation	Player
0	GK	CAN	Robert Stankov
1	GK	CAN	Nick Stankov
2	DF	CAN	Chris Devlin
3	MF	CAN	Robin Hart
5	DF	CAN	Liam da Silva
7	FW	CAN	Sean Fraser
8	MF	CAN	Carmelo Rago
10	FW	RSA	Sipho Sibiya

No.	Pos.	Nation	Player
11	DF	CAN	Kurt Bosch
13	MF	CAN	Eric Munoz
14	MF	LBR	Freddy Akok
17	MF	ENG	Daniel Drummond
18	DF	CAN	Simon Kassaye
20	MF	CAN	Desmond Tachie
28	MF	CAN	Gordon Chin

== Year-by-year ==
Year	Division	League	Reg. season	Playoffs	Open Cup	Avg. attendance
2004	2	USL A-League	6th, Western	Did not qualify	Did not qualify	1,478

== See also ==
- FC Edmonton
