= Jaime Lo Presti =

Chilean footballer (born 1974)

Jaime Lopresti
Personal information
- Full name: Jaime Julio Lopresti Travanic
- Date of birth: 27 January 1974 (age 52)
- Place of birth: Vancouver, British Columbia, Canada
- Height: 1.80 m (5 ft 11 in)
- Position: Defender

Youth career
- Universidad Católica

Senior career*
Years	Team	Apps	(Gls)
1992–1994	Universidad Católica		
1994	→ Coquimbo Unido (loan)		
1995	Coquimbo Unido		
1996–1997	Unión Española		
1998–1999	Deportes Iquique		
2000–2002	Colo-Colo		
2002–2003	Unión Española		
2004	Edmonton Aviators		

International career
1995	Chile	1	(0)
- * Club domestic league appearances and goals

Jaime Julio Lopresti Travanic (born 27 January 1974) is a Chilean former professional footballer who played as a defender.

== Club career ==
In 1992 Lopresti started his professional career for Universidad Católica at the age of 17. His pro debut was against Argentinian club Independiente de Avellaneda in August 1992. In 1994, Lopresti was loaned to Coquimbo Unido where he scored three goals playing in the right back position. Coquimbo Unido renewed his contract for the following 1995 season. In 1996, he signed with Unión Española and also renewed for the 1997 season. From 1998 to 1999 Lopresti travelled up to northern Chile to play for Deportes Iquique where he managed to be named top defender and scored five goals. His speed and strength caught the interest with the powerful Colo-Colo where he spent three seasons from 2000 to 2003. In 2004 Lopresti once again signed for Union Española and later that same year travelled to his native Canada to join the newly formed Edmonton Aviators of the USL A-League scoring two goals.

== International career ==
In 1995 Lopresti first caught the eye of the Chile men's national coach Xabier Azkargorta. That same year he made his first appearance in the Chilean men's team against Canada. In 2003, Lopresti was called again by the Chile Men’s National team coach Juvenal Olmos.
