= 1988 Winnipeg Blue Bombers season =

Canadian football team season

- General manager: Cal Murphy
- Head coach: Mike Riley
- Home stadium: Winnipeg Stadium

Results
- Record: 9–9
- Division place: 2nd, East
- Playoffs: Won Grey Cup

The 1988 Winnipeg Blue Bombers finished in second place in the East Division with a 9–9 record. They won the Grey Cup 22–21 over the favoured BC Lions, becoming the first team ever to win the Grey Cup with only a .500 record.

== Offseason ==
=== CFL draft ===
Round	Pick	Player	Position	School

== Preseason ==
Week	Date	Opponent	Result	Record
A	June 26	at Saskatchewan Roughriders	L 6–41	0–1
B	June 29	at Ottawa Rough Riders	W 30–25	1–1
C	July 5	vs. Toronto Argonauts	L 22–26	1–2

== Regular season ==
=== Standings ===
East Division
Pos	Team	Pld	W	L	T	PF	PA	PD	Pts	Div	Stk
1	Toronto Argonauts (C, Q)	18	14	4	0	571	326	245	28	8–2	W7
2	Winnipeg Blue Bombers (Q)	18	9	9	0	407	458	−51	18	3–3	L3
3	Hamilton Tiger-Cats (Q)	18	9	9	0	478	465	13	18	6–4	L1
4	Ottawa Rough Riders	18	2	16	0	278	618	−340	4	1–9	L2

Source: "1988 Regular Season Standings". Archived from the original on 2011-12-01.
(C) First round bye; (Q) Qualified for playoffs

=== Schedule ===
Week	Date	Opponent	Result	Record
1	July 12	at BC Lions	L 3–36	0–1
2	July 21	vs. Hamilton Tiger-Cats	W 21–9	1–1
3	July 29	at Saskatchewan Roughriders	L 18–46	1–2
4	Aug 6	vs. BC Lions	W 38–21	2–2
5	Aug 13	vs. Ottawa Rough Riders	L 17–28	2–3
6	Aug 19	at Edmonton Eskimos	L 21–46	2–4
7	Aug 24	at Calgary Stampeders	W 12–11	3–4
8	Aug 31	vs. Saskatchewan Roughriders	W 38–35	4–4
9	Sept 4	at Saskatchewan Roughriders	L 19–29	4–5
10	Sept 11	vs. BC Lions	W 34–8	5–5
11	Sept 17	vs. Calgary Stampeders	L 14–20	5–6
12	Sept 24	at Ottawa Rough Riders	W 31–0	6–6
13	Oct 2	vs. Saskatchewan Roughriders	W 32–20	7–6
14	Oct 10	vs. Edmonton Eskimos	W 21–17	8–6
15	Oct 16	at Hamilton Tiger-Cats	W 35–29	9–6
16	Oct 23	at Toronto Argonauts	L 13–36	9–7
17	Oct 30	vs. Toronto Argonauts	L 16–22	9–8
18	Nov 5	at BC Lions	L 24–45	9–9

== Playoffs ==
=== East Semi-Final ===
Team	Q1	Q2	Q3	Q4	Total
Hamilton Tiger-Cats	11	0	9	8	28
Winnipeg Blue Bombers	3	15	7	10	35

=== East Final ===
Team	Q1	Q2	Q3	Q4	Total
Winnipeg Blue Bombers	4	7	7	9	27
Toronto Argonauts	0	3	8	0	11

=== Grey Cup ===
Team	Q1	Q2	Q3	Q4	Total
Winnipeg Blue Bombers	4	10	5	3	22
BC Lions	7	8	4	2	21

== Roster ==
1988 Winnipeg Blue Bombers final roster
Quarterbacks: 7 Tom Muecke; 12 Sean Salisbury; 2 Lee Saltz; Running backs: 31 Terry Cochrane; 5 Tim Jessie; 23 Tony Johns; 74 Vernon Pahl; Receivers: 73 Randy Fabi; 21 James Murphy; 32 Buster Rhymes; 70 Paul Shorten; 80 Jeff Smith; 22 Perry Tuttle; 26 Ken Winey; 39 Darren Yewchyn	Offensive linemen: 65 Nick Bastaja G; 59 Lyle Bauer C; 51 David Black T; 60 Eddie McQuarters G; 60 Bob Molle G; 66 Steve Rodehutskors T; 61 Brad Tierney G; 63 Chris Walby T; Defensive linemen: 76 Romel Andrews DE; 79 Willie Fears DE; 52 Mike Gray DE; 44 Leon Hatziioannou DT; 79 Stan Mikawos DT; 52 Rob Prodanovic DT	Linebackers: 34 Greg Battle; 53 Aaron Brown; 48 Rod Calloway; 72 Delbert Fowler; 58 James West; 35 Dan Wicklum; Defensive backs: 33 Michael Allen; 29 Paul Clatney; 24 Ken Hailey; 10 Rod Hill; 20 James Jefferson; 8 Ken Pettway; 30 Darryl Sampson; 37 Bennie Thompson; Special teams: 6 Bob Cameron P; 3 Trevor Kennerd K; Italics indicate American player
