= 1988 Hamilton Tiger-Cats season =

Season of Canadian Football League team the Hamilton Tiger-Cats

- Head coach: Al Bruno
- Home stadium: Ivor Wynne Stadium

Results
- Record: 9–9
- Division place: 3rd, East
- Playoffs: Lost East Semi-Final
- Team MOP: Earl Winfield
- Team MOC: Rocky DiPietro
- Team MOR: Darrell Corbin

Uniform

The 1988 Hamilton Tiger-Cats season was the 31st season for the team in the Canadian Football League (CFL) and their 39th overall. The Tiger-Cats finished in third place in the East Division with a 9–9 record and lost the East Semi-Final to the Winnipeg Blue Bombers. Earl Winfield tied Steve Stapler's record for most touchdowns in one season with 13 (which Tony Champion broke the year later). It would be Stapler's final season with the Tiger-Cats, and he finished ranked fourth all-time in franchise history in touchdowns. Paul Osbaldiston would set a franchise record (which he would break on three separate occasions) for the most converts in one season with 49 made.

== Preseason ==
Week	Date	Opponent	Result	Record	Venue	Attendance
B	June 28	at Toronto Argonauts	L 12–16	0–1	Exhibition Stadium	
C	July 6	vs. Ottawa Rough Riders	L 34–36	0–2	Ivor Wynne Stadium	

== Regular season ==
=== Season standings ===
East Division
Pos	Team	Pld	W	L	T	PF	PA	PD	Pts	Div	Stk
1	Toronto Argonauts (C, Q)	18	14	4	0	571	326	245	28	8–2	W7
2	Winnipeg Blue Bombers (Q)	18	9	9	0	407	458	−51	18	3–3	L3
3	Hamilton Tiger-Cats (Q)	18	9	9	0	478	465	13	18	6–4	L1
4	Ottawa Rough Riders	18	2	16	0	278	618	−340	4	1–9	L2

Source: "1988 Regular Season Standings". Archived from the original on 2011-12-01.
(C) First round bye; (Q) Qualified for playoffs

=== Season schedule ===
Week	Date	Opponent	Result	Record	Venue	Attendance
1	July 16	vs. Toronto Argonauts	W 29–24	1–0	Ivor Wynne Stadium	
2	July 21	at Winnipeg Blue Bombers	L 9–21	1–1	Winnipeg Stadium	
3	July 30	at Calgary Stampeders	W 45–20	2–1	McMahon Stadium	
4	Aug 5	vs. Calgary Stampeders	L 14–38	2–2	Ivor Wynne Stadium	
5	Aug 12	vs. Edmonton Eskimos	W 22–14	3–2	Ivor Wynne Stadium	
6	Aug 16	at Toronto Argonauts	L 5–19	3–3	Exhibition Stadium	
7	Aug 27	vs. Ottawa Rough Riders	W 51–24	4–3	Ivor Wynne Stadium	
8	Sept 1	at Ottawa Rough Riders	W 46–20	5–3	Lansdowne Park	
8	Sept 5	vs. Toronto Argonauts	W 56–28	6–3	Ivor Wynne Stadium	
9	Sept 11	at Edmonton Eskimos	L 13–37	6–4	Commonwealth Stadium	
10	Sept 18	vs. Ottawa Rough Riders	W 35–25	7–4	Ivor Wynne Stadium	
11	Sept 25	at Saskatchewan Roughriders	L 24–26	7–5	Taylor Field	
12	Oct 1	vs. BC Lions	L 23–24	7–6	Ivor Wynne Stadium	
13	Oct 6	at BC Lions	L 21–25	7–7	BC Place	
14	Oct 16	vs. Winnipeg Blue Bombers	L 29–35	7–8	Ivor Wynne Stadium	
15	Oct 21	vs. Saskatchewan Roughriders	W 24–21	8–8	Ivor Wynne Stadium	
16	Oct 29	at Ottawa Rough Riders	W 23–15	9–8	Lansdowne Park	
17	Nov 6	at Toronto Argonauts	9–49	9–9	Exhibition Stadium	

== Postseason ==
=== Schedule ===
Game	Date	Opponent	Result	Record	Venue	Attendance
East Semi-Final	Nov 13	at Winnipeg Blue Bombers	L 28–35	0–1	Winnipeg Stadium	

== Roster ==
1988 Hamilton Tiger-Cats final roster
Quarterbacks: 5 Terry Andrysiak; 8 Tom Porras; Running backs: 74 Steve Jackson; 24 Johnnie Jones; 27 Martin Sartin; 35 Jed Tommy; 22 Ken Zachary; Wide receivers: 87 Tony Champion; 85 Jacques Chapdelaine; 71 Richard Estell; 80 Steve Stapler; 1 Earl Winfield; 21 Wally Zatylny; Tight ends: 23 Rocky Dipietro; 25 Lee Knight	Offensive linemen: 55 Doug Davies T/G; 68 Mike Derks C/T; 62 Lloyd Fairbanks T; 66 Miles Gorrell T; 56 Jason Riley G; 56 Dale Sanderson C; 67 Ralph Scholz G; Defensive linemen: 77 Grover Covington DE; 64 Tim Lorenz DT; 79 Mark Napiorkowski DE; 88 Dale Sauve DE; 59 Rod Skillman DT; 61 Mike Walker DT; Special teams: 3 Paul Osbaldiston K/P; Injured List: 2 Mike Kerrigan QB	Linebackers: 30 Keith Castello; 40 Toney Catchings; 38 Darrell Corbin; 39 Ed Gataveckas; 90 Pete Giftopoulos; 78 Darrell Patterson; 43 Frank Robinson; 33 Mike Robinson; Defensive backs: 29 Alvin Bailey; 16 Howard Fields; 14 Scott Flagel; 7 Donnohue Grant; 20 Arnold Grevious; 6 Jim Rockford; 28 Lance Shields; 13 King Simmons; Italics indicate American players

== Awards and honours ==
- Ralph Sazio was elected into the Canadian Football Hall of Fame as a Builder on March 5, 1988.
- CFL's Most Outstanding Defensive Player Award – Grover Covington (DE)

=== 1988 CFL All-Stars ===
- DE – Grover Covington
- DB – Howard Fields
- DT – Mike Walker
- ST – Earl Winfield
