= 1988 BC Lions season =

Canadian football team season

- General manager: Joe Galat
- Head coach: Larry Donovan
- Home stadium: BC Place Stadium

Results
- Record: 10–8
- Division place: 3rd, West
- Playoffs: Lost Grey Cup

Uniform

The 1988 BC Lions finished in third place in the West Division with a 10–8 record. They appeared in the 76th Grey Cup as the team favoured to win, but they lost to the Winnipeg Blue Bombers 22–21.

== Offseason ==
=== CFL draft ===
Round	Pick	Player	Position	School

== Preseason ==
Game	Date	Opponent	Results		Venue	Attendance
Game	Date	Opponent	Score	Record	Venue	Attendance
A	Tue, June 28	vs. Calgary Stampeders	L 27–39	0–1	BC Place	30,492
B	Tue, July 5	at Saskatchewan Roughriders	W 46–27	1–1	Taylor Field	

== Regular season ==
=== Season standings ===
West Division
Pos	Team	Pld	W	L	T	PF	PA	PD	Pts	Div	Stk
1	Edmonton Eskimos (C, Q)	18	11	7	0	477	408	69	22	6–4	W1
2	Saskatchewan Roughriders (Q)	18	11	7	0	525	452	73	22	5–3	W1
3	BC Lions (Q)	18	10	8	0	489	417	72	20	4–4	W3
4	Calgary Stampeders	18	6	12	0	395	476	−81	12	3–7	L1

Source: "CFL.ca". Archived from the original on 2009-10-20.
(C) First round bye; (Q) Qualified for playoffs

=== Season schedule ===
Week	Game	Date	Opponent	Results		Venue	Attendance
Week	Game	Date	Opponent	Score	Record	Venue	Attendance
1	1	Tue, July 12	vs. Winnipeg Blue Bombers	W 36–3	1–0	BC Place	38,347
2	2	Fri, July 22	vs. Calgary Stampeders	W 44–31	2–0	BC Place	33,147
3	3	Thu, July 28	at Toronto Argonauts	L 21–26	2–1	Exhibition Stadium	21,846
4	4	Sat, Aug 6	at Winnipeg Blue Bombers	L 21–38	2–2	Winnipeg Stadium	24,854
5	5	Thu, Aug 11	vs. Toronto Argonauts	L 12–24	2–3	BC Place	29,621
6	6	Thu, Aug 18	at Ottawa Rough Riders	W 27–20	3–3	Lansdowne Park	24,598
7	7	Thu, Aug 25	vs. Edmonton Eskimos	W 28–10	4–3	BC Place	33,825
8	8	Thu, Sept 1	at Edmonton Eskimos	L 9–17	4–4	Commonwealth Stadium	34,157
9	9	Tue, Sept 6	vs. Ottawa Rough Riders	W 24–11	5–4	BC Place	25,504
10	10	Sun, Sept 11	at Winnipeg Blue Bombers	L 8–34	5–5	Winnipeg Stadium	23,281
11	11	Fri, Sept 16	vs. Saskatchewan Roughriders	L 32–36	5–6	BC Place	33,088
12	12	Fri, Sept 23	at Calgary Stampeders	L 22–40	5–7	McMahon Stadium	17,578
13	13	Sat, Oct 1	at Hamilton Tiger-Cats	W 24–23	6–7	Ivor Wynne Stadium	14,207
14	14	Fri, Oct 7	vs. Hamilton Tiger-Cats	W 25–21	7–7	BC Place	28,019
15	15	Sun, Oct 16	at Saskatchewan Roughriders	L 25–28	7–8	Taylor Field	27,649
16	16	Sun, Oct 23	at Edmonton Eskimos	W 35–15	8–8	Commonwealth Stadium	30,030
17	17	Sat, Oct 29	vs. Edmonton Eskimos	W 51–16	9–8	BC Place	32,234
18	18	Sat, Nov 5	vs. Winnipeg Blue Bombers	W 45–24	10–8	BC Place	35,063

== Awards and records ==
- CFL's Most Outstanding Player Award – David Williams (WR)
- Jeff Nicklin Memorial Trophy – David Williams (WR)

=== 1988 CFL All-Stars ===
- QB – Matt Dunigan, CFL All-Star
- RB – Anthony Cherry, CFL All-Star
- WR – David Williams, CFL All-Star
- OG – Gerald Roper, CFL All-Star
- OT – Jim Mills, CFL All-Star
- LB – Greg Stumon, CFL All-Star

== Playoffs ==
=== West Semi-Final ===
Team	Q1	Q2	Q3	Q4	Total
Saskatchewan Roughriders	10	7	0	1	18
BC Lions	7	11	10	14	42

=== West Final ===
Team	Q1	Q2	Q3	Q4	Total
Edmonton Eskimos	11	4	1	3	19
BC Lions	10	7	3	17	37

=== Grey Cup ===
Team	Q1	Q2	Q3	Q4	Total
Winnipeg Blue Bombers	4	10	5	3	22
BC Lions	7	8	4	2	21

== Roster ==
1988 BC Lions final roster
Quarterbacks: 16 Matt Dunigan; 1 Rickey Foggie; 12 Willie Gillus; Running backs: 24 Tony Cherry; 21 Wes Cooper; 35 Kevin Dixon; 19 Anthony Parker; 23 Jamie Taras; 26 Reggie Taylor; Receivers: 27 Jan Carinci; 34 Scott Lecky; 33 Andrew Murray; 80 Eric Streater; 6 Mark Waterman; 2 David Williams	Offensive linemen: 69 Jamie Buis G/T; 67 Larry Clarkson T; 62 John Coflin C/G; 66 Jim Mills T; 65 Gerald Roper G; 55 Ian Sinclair C; 54 Rob Smith T; 50 Pieter Vanden Bos G; Defensive linemen: 79 Walter Ballard DE; 64 Brian Belway DT; 70 Dwayne Derban DE/DT; 91 Gino Mingo DE; 78 Mack Moore DT; 40 James Parker DE; 72 Mark Turner DT	Linebackers: 44 Jeff Braswell; 7 Bernie Glier; 31 Kevin Konar; 36 Rob Moretto; 53 Mark Smith; 45 Gregg Stumon; 76 John Ulmer; Defensive backs: 28 Larry Crawford; 39 Anthony Drawhorn; 14 Andre Francis; 18 Keith Gooch; 8 Rick Ryan; 38 Marcus Thomas; 32 Todd Wiseman; Special teams: 5 Lui Passaglia K/P; Italics indicate International player
