= 1988 Saskatchewan Roughriders season =

Season of the Canadian Football League

- General manager: Bill Baker
- Head coach: John Gregory
- Home stadium: Taylor Field

Results
- Record: 11–7
- Division place: 2nd, West
- Playoffs: Lost West Semi-Final

Uniform

The 1988 Saskatchewan Roughriders season was the club's 79th year of operation, 74th season of play, and its 31st season in the Canadian Football League. The team qualified for the CFL playoffs for the first time since 1976, finishing in second place in the CFL West Division with an 11–7 record. The Roughriders hosted the West Semi-Final, their first home playoff game since the 1976 CFL Western Final, but were defeated by the B.C. Lions 42–18.

== Offseason ==
=== CFL draft ===
Round	Pick	Player	Position	School
1	2	Jeff Fairholm	WR/SB	Arizona
1	6	Pete Giftopoulos	LB	Penn State
2	9	Ken Evraire	WR	Wilfrid Laurier
2	10	Peter Mangold	FB	Western Ontario
3	18	Jim Jauch	DB	North Carolina
5	37	John Hoffman	TB/P	Saskatchewan
6	42	Darrell Harle	T	Eastern Michigan
7	50	Hugh Alexander	T	Utah
8	58	Floyd Collins	TB	Boise State

== Preseason ==
Game	Date	Opponent	Results		Venue	Attendance
Game	Date	Opponent	Score	Record	Venue	Attendance
A	Sun, June 26	vs. Winnipeg Blue Bombers	W 41–6	1–0	Gordie Howe Bowl	5,100
B	Tues, July 5	vs. BC Lions	L 27–46	1–1	Taylor Field	17,600

== Regular season ==
=== Standings ===
West Division
Pos	Team	Pld	W	L	T	PF	PA	PD	Pts	Div	Stk
1	Edmonton Eskimos (C, Q)	18	11	7	0	477	408	69	22	6–4	W1
2	Saskatchewan Roughriders (Q)	18	11	7	0	525	452	73	22	5–3	W1
3	BC Lions (Q)	18	10	8	0	489	417	72	20	4–4	W3
4	Calgary Stampeders	18	6	12	0	395	476	−81	12	3–7	L1

Source: "CFL.ca". Archived from the original on 2009-10-20.
(C) First round bye; (Q) Qualified for playoffs

Edmonton finished ahead of Saskatchewan in the standings by winning their 2-game head-to-head series by a point total of 58–53.

=== Schedule ===
Week	Game	Date	Opponent	Results		Venue	Attendance
Week	Game	Date	Opponent	Score	Record	Venue	Attendance
1	1	Fri, July 15	at Ottawa Rough Riders	W 48–21	1–0	Lansdowne Park	22,565
2	2	Sat, July 23	vs. Edmonton Eskimos	W 26–15	2–0	Taylor Field	22,682
3	3	Fri, July 29	vs. Winnipeg Blue Bombers	W 46–18	3–0	Taylor Field	24,301
4	4	Thu, Aug 4	at Edmonton Eskimos	L 27–43	3–1	Commonwealth Stadium	35,383
5	5	Wed, Aug 10	at Calgary Stampeders	L 10–48	3–2	McMahon Stadium	23,120
6	6	Sat, Aug 20	vs. Calgary Stampeders	W 24–21	4–2	Taylor Field	24,265
7	7	Fri, Aug 26	vs. Toronto Argonauts	L 21–23	4–3	Taylor Field	24,662
8	8	Wed, Aug 31	at Winnipeg Blue Bombers	L 35–38	4–4	Winnipeg Stadium	26,177
8	9	Sun, Sept 4	vs. Winnipeg Blue Bombers	W 29–19	5–4	Taylor Field	29,438
9	10	Fri, Sept 9	at Toronto Argonauts	W 14–13	6–4	SkyDome	23,498
10	11	Fri, Sept 16	at BC Lions	W 36–32	7–4	BC Place	33,088
11	12	Sun, Sept 25	vs. Hamilton Tiger-Cats	W 26–24	8–4	Taylor Field	28,171
12	13	Sun, Oct 2	at Winnipeg Blue Bombers	L 20–32	8–5	Winnipeg Stadium	27,356
13	14	Sun, Oct 9	vs. Calgary Stampeders	W 47–17	9–5	Taylor Field	23,234
14	15	Sun, Oct 16	vs. BC Lions	W 28–25	10–5	Taylor Field	27,649
15	16	Fri, Oct 21	at Hamilton Tiger-Cats	L 21–24	10–6	Ivor Wynne Stadium	13,702
16	17	Sun, Oct 30	at Calgary Stampeders	L 22–28	10–7	McMahon Stadium	18,863
17	18	Sun, Nov 6	vs. Ottawa Rough Riders	W 45–11	11–7	Taylor Field	24,615

== Postseason ==
=== Schedule ===
Round	Date	Opponent	Results		Venue	Attendance
Round	Date	Opponent	Score	Record	Venue	Attendance
West Semi-Final	Sun, Nov 13	vs. BC Lions	L 18–42	0–1	Taylor Field	26,229

== Roster ==
1988 Saskatchewan Roughriders final roster
Quarterbacks: 5 Kent Austin; 1 Jeff Bentrim; 16 Tom Burgess; Running backs: 37 David Conrad; 30 Denny Ferdinand; 32 Milson Jones; 14 Tim McCray; Receivers: 83 Rob Bresciani; 81 Ray Elgaard; 85 James Ellingson; 18 Jeff Fairholm; 86 Ray McDonald; 80 Don Narcisse	Offensive linemen: 44 Roger Aldag G; 66 Mike Anderson C; 63 Bill Henry C; 61 Bryan Illerbrun G; 64 Ken Moore T; 57 Bob Poley T; 62 Vic Stevenson T; 54 Mark Urness G; Defensive linemen: 78 James Curry DT; 70 Vince Goldsmith DE; 71 Bobby Jurasin DE; 90 Rick Klassen DT; 79 Gary Lewis DT; 75 Greg McCormack DE	Linebackers: 39 Dave Albright; 38 Steve Crane; 48 June James; 42 Eddie Lowe; 74 Dan Rashovich; Defensive backs: 4 Albert Brown; 7 Richie Hall; 24 Joe Fuller; 28 Mike McGruder; 26 Harry Skipper; 27 Glen Suitor; 21 Jeff Treftlin; 2 Eddie Ray Walker; Special teams: 10 Terry Baker P; 36 Dave Ridgway K; Italics indicate American player
