= 1988 Edmonton Eskimos season =

Canadian football team season

- General manager: Hugh Campbell
- Head coach: Joe Faragalli
- Home stadium: Commonwealth Stadium

Results
- Record: 11–7
- Division place: 1st, West
- Playoffs: Lost West Final

Uniform

The 1988 Edmonton Eskimos season was the 31st season for the team in the Canadian Football League (CFL) and their 40th overall. The Eskimos finished the season in first place with an 11–7 record. They appeared in the West Final where they lost to the BC Lions.

The Eskimos offense had 496 points for, while the defense had 445 points allowed. During the season, Tracy Ham emerged as the team's starting quarterback for the next five seasons.

== Off-season ==
=== CFL draft ===
Round	Pick	Player	Position	School
1	8	Brian Forde	LB	Washington State
2	16	Branko Vincic	DL	Eastern Michigan
3	24	Greg Nyte	DB	Simon Fraser
4	32	Todd Middleton	LB	Dickinson State
5	40	Greg Kratzer	WR	Dickinson State
6	48	Terry Ainge	DB	British Columbia
7	56	Stephen Kasowski	P/K-WR	Alberta
8	64	Neil Ferguson	DB	Alberta

== Regular season ==
=== Standings ===
West Division
Pos	Team	Pld	W	L	T	PF	PA	PD	Pts	Div	Stk
1	Edmonton Eskimos (C, Q)	18	11	7	0	477	408	69	22	6–4	W1
2	Saskatchewan Roughriders (Q)	18	11	7	0	525	452	73	22	5–3	W1
3	BC Lions (Q)	18	10	8	0	489	417	72	20	4–4	W3
4	Calgary Stampeders	18	6	12	0	395	476	−81	12	3–7	L1

Source: "CFL.ca". Archived from the original on 2009-10-20.
(C) First round bye; (Q) Qualified for playoffs

Edmonton finished ahead of Saskatchewan in the standings by winning their 2-game head-to-head series by a point total of 58–53.

Edmonton set the CFL record for most consecutive seasons, .500 or better (17), breaking the record of 16 Saskatchewan set from 1962-1977.

=== Season schedule ===
Week	Game	Date	Opponent	Results		Venue	Attendance
Week	Game	Date	Opponent	Score	Record	Venue	Attendance
1	1	July 14	vs. Calgary Stampeders	W 33–0	1–0	Commonwealth Stadium	27,889
2	2	July 23	at Saskatchewan Roughriders	L 15–26	1–1	Taylor Field	22,682
3	3	July 27	at Ottawa Rough Riders	W 35–28	2–1	Lansdowne Park	19,947
4	4	Aug 4	vs. Saskatchewan Roughriders	W 43–27	3–1	Commonwealth Stadium	35,383
5	5	Aug 12	at Hamilton Tiger-Cats	L 14–22	3–2	Ivor Wynne Stadium	13,127
6	6	Aug 19	vs. Winnipeg Blue Bombers	W 46–21	4–2	Commonwealth Stadium	30,172
7	7	Aug 25	at BC Lions	L 10–28	4–3	BC Place	33,825
8	8	Sept 1	vs. BC Lions	W 17–9	5–3	Commonwealth Stadium	34,157
8	9	Sept 5	at Calgary Stampeders	W 27–11	6–3	McMahon Stadium	27,768
9	10	Sept 11	vs. Hamilton Tiger-Cats	W 37–13	7–3	Commonwealth Stadium	29,984
10	11	Sept 18	vs. Toronto Argonauts	W 38–21	8–3	Commonwealth Stadium	33,549
11	12	Sept 25	at Toronto Argonauts	L 22–35	8–4	Varsity Stadium	24,104
12	13	Oct 2	vs. Ottawa Rough Riders	W 40–12	9–4	Commonwealth Stadium	28,052
13	14	Oct 10	at Winnipeg Blue Bombers	L 17–21	9–5	Winnipeg Stadium	26,298
14	15	Oct 16	at Calgary Stampeders	W 32–29	10–5	McMahon Stadium	29,430
15	16	Oct 23	vs. BC Lions	L 15–35	10–6	Commonwealth Stadium	30,030
16	17	Oct 29	at BC Lions	L 16–51	10–7	BC Place	32,334
17	18	Nov 6	vs. Calgary Stamepders	W 20–19	11–7	Commonwealth Stadium	27,499

Total attendance: 276,715
Average attendance: 30,746 (51.2%)

== Statistics ==
=== Punt Returns ===
Player	Games Played	Number	Yards	Long	Touchdowns
Henry Gizmo Williams	17	96	964	100	2

=== Kickoff Returns ===
Player	Games Played	Number	Yards	Long	Touchdowns
Henry Gizmo Williams	17	15	379	34	0

=== Missed Field Goal Returns ===
Player	Games Played	Number	Yards	Long	Touchdowns
Henry Gizmo Williams	17	5	90	22	0

== Awards ==
- CFLPA's Most Outstanding Community Service Award - Hector Pothier (OT)
- Norm Fieldgate Trophy - Danny Bass (LB)

== Playoffs ==
=== Schedule ===
Week	Date	Opponent	Results		Venue	Attendance
Week	Date	Opponent	Score	Record	Venue	Attendance
Division Final	Nov 20	vs. BC Lions	L 19–37	0–1	Commonwealth Stadium	27,055

The West Final was the first time the Eskimos lost a playoff game at Commonwealth Stadium. The loss also ended the CFL's longest ever home playoff winning streak (12).

== Roster ==
1988 Edmonton Eskimos final roster
Quarterbacks: 9 Damon Allen; 8 Tracy Ham; 18 Greg Vavra; 15 Rick Worman; Running backs: 83 Chris Johnstone; 22 Blake Marshall; 35 Chris Skinner; 34 Brian Walling; Receivers: 27 Marco Cyncar; 31 Rick House; 78 Stephen Jones; 89 Greg Kratzer; 25 Tom Richards; 7 Jim Sandusky; 2 Gizmo Williams; 74 Slater Zaleski	Offensive linemen: 66 Trevor Bowles T; 67 Rod Connop C; 50 Blake Dermott G; 55 Andrew McConnell C/T; 63 Hector Pothier T; 68 Kevin Powell G; 51 Dave Richardson T; 62 Bill Stevenson G; 54 Pierre Vercheval G; Defensive linemen: 36 Stewart Hill DE; 95 Dan Kearns DE; 75 John Mandarich DT; 94 Lloyd Mumphrey DT; 98 Gary Palumbis DT; 91 Brett Williams DE/DT	Linebackers: 30 Danny Bass; 45 Mike McLean; 38 Brian Warren; 47 Larry Wruck; Defensive backs: 24 Steve Benjamin; 5 Stanley Blair; 3 Darryl Gaines; 28 Ron Howard; 23 Mark Norman; 11 Junior Robinson; 19 Danny Taylor; 6 Cliff Toney; 20 Don Wilson; Special teams: 4 Jerry Kauric K/P; Italics indicate International player
