= Gerald Alphin =

American football player (born 1964)

No. 86
- Positions: Wide receiver, slotback

Personal information
- Born: May 21, 1964 (age 62); Portland, Oregon, U.S.
- Listed height: 6 ft 3 in (1.91 m)
- Listed weight: 220 lb (100 kg)

Career information
- High school: University City (University City, Missouri)
- College: Kansas State
- NFL draft: 1986: undrafted

Career history
- Los Angeles Raiders (1986)*; Montreal Alouettes (1986); Ottawa Rough Riders (1987–1989); New Orleans Saints (1990–1991); Dallas Cowboys (1992)*; Winnipeg Blue Bombers (1992–1995); Baltimore Stallions/Montreal Alouettes (1995–1996)
- * Offseason or practice squad member only

Awards and highlights
- Grey Cup champion (1995); CFL East All-Star 1988; Second-team All-Big Eight (1985)
- Stats at Pro Football Reference

Gerald Alan Alphin (born May 21, 1964) is an American former professional football player who was a wide receiver and slotback for eight seasons in the Canadian Football League (CFL) from 1986 to 1996, mainly for the Ottawa Rough Riders and the Winnipeg Blue Bombers. Alphin played college football for the Kansas State Wildcats. Alphin recorded four 1,000-yard receiving seasons, including a period of three consecutive 1,000-yard seasons with the Rough Riders during which he was considered one of the best receivers playing in the CFL. He was named an East all-star in 1988.

Alphin briefly played in the National Football League (NFL) for the New Orleans Saints from 1991 to 1992. He also signed with the Los Angeles Raiders and Dallas Cowboys of the NFL during his career, although he did not play any games for them. In his final season in the CFL, Alphin became a Grey Cup champion with the Baltimore Stallions before being cut from the team and retiring when the Stallions moved to Montreal to become the Montreal Alouettes. Alphin ended his CFL career with 414 catches for 7,315 yards and 52 touchdowns in regular season games.

== Early life ==
Alphin was born in Portland, Oregon on May 21, 1964. He played high school football at University City High School in University City, Missouri, where he played both tight end and safety. In February 1982, Alphin signed to play for the Kansas State Wildcats in college. In his first year at Kansas State University, Alphin was converted to a wide receiver. As a junior in 1984, Alphin caught 14 passes for 256 yards, (Note: In 1984, Alphin caught a total of 14 passes. The combined number of yards that he gained from these catches was 256.) including three catches for 130 yards in a game against the Missouri Tigers in October. Receivers coach Jim Otto cited Alphin as a "leader" going into his senior season, but Alphin missed a month of play to start the season due to a sprained shoulder suffered in the preseason. In October, Alphin caught a touchdown pass in the Wildcats' only win of the season. Alphin was named an honorable mention for the AP All-America team in his final season with the Wildcats.

== Professional career ==
=== Career beginnings ===
Alphin went undrafted in the 1986 NFL draft. The Los Angeles Raiders of the National Football League signed Alphin before the 1986 season as an unrestricted free agent but cut him in early August before the start of the regular season. Alphin later signed with the Montreal Alouettes of the Canadian Football League and played in the latter half of their 1986 season. In Montreal, Alphin was played at the position of slotback. He recorded 20 catches for 409 yards over six regular season games, including two touchdowns in a November loss to the Toronto Argonauts.

=== Ottawa Rough Riders ===
Alphin remained with the Alouettes through training camp in 1987, but the Alouettes folded before the start of the regular season. The Ottawa Rough Riders signed Alphin shortly after. In a July win over the Argonauts, Alphin caught seven passes for 100 yards and two touchdowns. By mid-August, the media regarded Alphin as "[one] of Ottawa's finest players" as he continued to perform well. His season was briefly halted by a hand injury in late August, which caused him to miss playing time. By late September, Alphin was the top receiver for the Rough Riders, with head coach Fred Glick describing his game plan as "run the ball a lot and pass to Gerald Alphin". He finished the season with 1,029 yards off 67 catches with eight touchdowns. Alphin was also used sporadically as a kick returner in 1987.

Playing in 15 regular season games in 1988, Alphin recorded his second 1,000-yard season with 1,307 receiving yards on 64 catches for five touchdowns. Described as a "legitimate deep-threat receiver" by the Toronto Star, Alphin gave several noteworthy performances throughout the season. In a mid-August win over the Winnipeg Blue Bombers, Alphin caught three touchdowns, although two were invalidated by offensive penalties. He caught six passes for 163 yards in an early September loss to the Hamilton Tiger-Cats before recording 161 receiving yards and two touchdowns against the Tiger-Cats later that same month. Alphin finished the season as one of the CFL's leading receivers and was named an East Division all-star.

Alphin continued in his role as Ottawa's leading receiver in 1989. The Rough Riders briefly played Alphin at wide receiver during the season, but he returned to the slotback position by early October, where "coaches [felt] he [was] most effective". He caught two touchdown passes among eight catches for 174 yards in an August 31 win against the BC Lions. By late September, Alphin led the CFL in receiving yards. In the penultimate game of the season, Alphin passed for a touchdown on an option, but he broke his hand during the play. This forced him to miss the final game of the season. He finished with 68 catches for 1,471 yards and 10 touchdowns, all career highs. His yardage total was the second highest in the CFL for 1989. He also recorded an average of 21.6 yards per reception, another career high. He was named the best Ottawa Rough Riders player of the season. While Alphin was named on every all-star ballot, he failed to make the all-star team because the votes he received were split between the wide receiver and slotback positions.

=== NFL career ===
Prior to the 1990 season, Alphin's contract with Ottawa was due to expire. The Rough Riders offered Alphin a contract, but he declined in order to pursue a career in the National Football League. In March 1990, the New Orleans Saints signed Alphin to a two-year contract. Alphin played a limited amount of time in the preseason, but he was effective when on the field. The Saints kept Alphin on the roster going into the regular season as a backup wide receiver. During the regular season, Alphin was active in eleven games, recording four catches for 57 yards. The Saints released Alphin in February 1991 but signed him back to the team just months later in July. He played in five regular season games for the Saints in 1991 before being released from the team in October.

In early 1992, the Dallas Cowboys signed Alphin to a two-year contract. He was released in the final cuts before the start of the regular season.

=== Winnipeg Blue Bombers ===
Immediately after Alphin was released by the Cowboys, the Rough Riders expressed interest in returning Alphin to Ottawa. Alphin instead signed with the Winnipeg Blue Bombers after being recruited by head coach Urban Bowman, who had been on the Ottawa coaching staff while Alphin played there. The Rough Riders were sharply criticized by local sports media for losing Alphin to their division rivals, with the Ottawa Citizen describing the situation as "a major coup for Winnipeg". In October, Alphin stated in an interview that he signed with the Blue Bombers because their initial salary offer was substantially stronger compared to the Rough Riders.

Alphin debuted for the Blue Bombers in a September 13 game against the Saskatchewan Roughriders, recording five catches for 91 yards. He finished the 1992 regular season with 26 catches for 507 yards and two touchdowns over ten games. He also caught a touchdown in an East Final win against the Hamilton Tiger-Cats. The Blue Bombers lost to the Calgary Stampeders 24–10 in the 80th Grey Cup. In the Grey Cup match, Alphin caught five passes for 103 yards and a touchdown.

In his first full season with the Blue Bombers, Alphin played in 16 regular season games. He struggled with injuries early in the season, dealing with both a knee and leg injury in late July and early August. Alphin had his fourth 1,000 yard season with 1,052 yards from 55 catches along with four touchdowns. In November, Blue Bombers receiver David Williams stated in interviews that Edmonton Eskimos safety Dan Murphy tried to intentionally injure Alphin earlier in the season by targeting his knees. Alphin was also the center of a brief controversy in the middle of the postseason when multiple news outlets reported that he and Williams were discontent with the number of passes thrown to them by quarterback Sammy Garza. Both Alphin and head coach Cal Murphy denied the reports. Alphin appeared in his second Grey Cup against the Eskimos. He caught three passes for 55 yards in the 23–33 loss.

Alphin returned to the Blue Bombers in 1994. He caught two touchdown passes while playing an August game against his former team, the Ottawa Rough Riders. Alphin was named CFL player of the week for tying a season single-game high with four receiving touchdowns against the Shreveport Pirates in early October. He finished the regular season with 994 yards on a career-high 73 catches with eighteen touchdowns, also a career-high. The Blue Bombers went on to lose in the East Final to the Baltimore CFL Colts.

In the offseason prior to the 1995 season, the Blue Bombers considered signing free agent receiver Jock Climie, a Canadian who could replace Alphin while having a favorable effect on the Blue Bombers' import ratio. (Note: CFL rules stipulate that all teams must have a certain numbers of Canadians (or non-imports) on their rosters.) This signing did not occur, however. After Alphin struggled with dropped passes in the early season, the Blue Bombers looked to trade him and eventually released him in mid-September. Alphin finished his partial season with the Blue Bombers with 417 yards on 32 catches.

=== Baltimore Stallions ===
By the end of September, Alphin was signed onto the practice squad of the Baltimore CFL Colts, now renamed the Baltimore Stallions. The Baltimore Stallions signed Alphin to provide more depth at receiver following injuries to Reggie Perry and Robert Clark. He played in four regular season games with the Stallions, recording nine catches for 129 yards and two touchdowns. In his third Grey Cup appearance, Alphin became a Grey Cup champion when the Stallions defeated the Stampeders 37–20 in the 83rd Grey Cup. The Baltimore Stallions franchise was relocated to Montreal to become the Montreal Alouettes in 1996 after the CFL withdrew from the United States. Alphin made the move with the team but was cut in the preseason.

=== CFL season statistics ===
			Receiving					Rushing					Kick returns					Misc	
Year	Team	GP	Rec	Yds	Avg	Long	TD	Att	Yds	Avg	Long	TD	KR	Yds	Avg	Long	TD	Fumbles	Tackles
1986	MTL	6	20	409	20.5	55	2	0	0	0.0	0	0	0	0	0.0	0	0	1	0
1987	OTT	14	67	1,029	15.4	57	8	4	12	3.0	9	0	10	189	18.9	32	0	4	2
1988	OTT	15	64	1,307	20.4	61	5	1	−2	−2.0	−2	0	0	0	0.0	0	0	2	0
1989	OTT	17	68	1,471	21.6	78	10	3	9	3.0	14	0	0	0	0.0	0	0	0	4
1992	WPG	9	26	507	19.5	73	2	0	0	0.0	0	0	0	0	0.0	0	0	0	3
1993	WPG	16	55	1,052	19.1	54	4	0	0	0.0	0	0	1	0	0.0	0	0	2	2
1994	WPG	18	73	994	19.1	50	18	0	0	0.0	0	0	0	0	0.0	0	0	2	4
1995	WPG	9	32	417	13.0	33	0	0	0	0.0	0	0	0	0	0.0	0	0	0	1
1995	BAL	4	9	129	14.3	26	2	0	0	0.0	0	0	0	0	0.0	0	0	0	1
Total		108	414	7,315	17.7	78	52	8	19	2.4	14	0	11	189	17.2	32	0	11	17

== Later life ==
In 1990, Alphin founded Omnipotent Investment with two classmates from high school. Omnipotent was a real estate investment firm, which Alphin considered a backup plan to professional football at the time. Omnipotent Investment was led by one of its co-founders until it folded in 2009.

As of 2017, Alphin is a real estate investor with HouseJerk.
