= Romel Andrews =

American football player (born 1963)

No. 76
- Position: Defensive end

Personal information
- Born: July 4, 1963 (age 63); Ripley, Tennessee, U.S.
- Listed height: 6 ft 4 in (1.93 m)
- Listed weight: 230 lb (104 kg)

Career information
- High school: Ripley (TN)
- College: Tennessee–Martin

Career history
- 1986–1988: Hamilton Tiger-Cats
- 1988–1989: Winnipeg Blue Bombers
- 1990: Washington Redskins*
- 1990–1995: Hamilton Tiger-Cats
- * Offseason or practice squad member only

Awards and highlights
- 2× Grey Cup champion (1986, 1988)

Career CFL statistics
- Tackles: 91
- Quarterback sacks: 31
- Fumbles recovered: 2

Romel Andrews (born July 4, 1963) is an American former professional football defensive end who played eight seasons in the Canadian Football League (CFL) with the Hamilton Tiger-Cats and Winnipeg Blue Bombers. He played college football at the University of Tennessee at Martin.

== Early life ==
Andrews played high school football at Ripley High School in Ripley, Tennessee. He also participated in track and field for the Tigers.

== College career ==
Andrews played for the Tennessee Pacers from 1981 to 1985, earning All-Conference All-Star honors.

== Professional career ==
Andrews was signed by the Hamilton Tiger-Cats in August 1986 and released by the team in August 1988.

Andrews played for the Winnipeg Blue Bombers from 1988 to 1989.

Andrews signed with the Washington Redskins in March 1990. He was released by the Redskins during training camp.

Andrews was signed by the Tiger-Cats in September 1990 and played for the team from 1990 to 1994. He became a free agent in February 1995.
