= Tom Muecke =

American gridiron football player (1963–2016)

No. 7, 15
- Position: Quarterback

Personal information
- Born: August 20, 1963; Waco, Texas, U.S.
- Died: April 23, 2016 (aged 52); Friendswood, Texas, U.S.
- Listed height: 6 ft 1 in (1.85 m)
- Listed weight: 195 lb (88 kg)

Career information
- High school: Angleton (TX)
- College: Baylor

Career history
- 1986–1988: Winnipeg Blue Bombers
- 1990: Calgary Stampeders*
- 1990: Houston Oilers*
- 1991–1994: Edmonton Eskimos
- 1994: Shreveport Pirates
- * Offseason or practice squad member only

Awards and highlights
- 3× Grey Cup champion (1988, 1990, 1993)

Career CFL statistics
- Comp. / Att.: 311 / 612
- Passing yards: 4,298
- TD–INT: 33–28
- Rushing TDs: 2

Thomas Warren Muecke, Jr. (pronounced Mickey; August 20, 1963 – April 23, 2016) was an American professional football quarterback who played seven seasons in the Canadian Football League (CFL) with the Winnipeg Blue Bombers, Edmonton Eskimos and Shreveport Pirates. He played college football at Baylor University. He was also a member of the Houston Oilers and Calgary Stampeders.

== Early life ==
Muecke played high school football at Angleton High School in Angleton, Texas. He led the team to a 10–0 season.

== College career ==
Muecke played for the Baylor Bears from 1982 to 1985. He graduated with a bachelor's degree in business administration. He was inducted into the Baylor Athletic Hall of Fame in 2015.

== Professional career ==
Muecke signed with the CFL's Winnipeg Blue Bombers in August 1986 and played for the team from 1986 to 1988. He was signed by the Calgary Stampeders of the CFL in 1990 but retired before the start of the 1990 CFL season. He then began selling insurance in Waco, Texas. Muecke came out of retirement for a tryout with the Houston Oilers of the National Football League in June 1990 and signed with the team in July 1990. He was later signed to the Oilers' practice squad in October 1990. He was released by the Oilers in August 1991. Muecke was signed by the Edmonton Eskimos of the CFL in September 1991. He was released by the Eskimos in June 1994. He signed with the CFL's Shreveport Pirates in July 1994. Muecke was released by the Pirates in August 1994.

== Personal life ==
Muecke graduated with a Doctor of Optometry degree from the University of Houston College of Optometry after his football career. He spent time working as an optometrist.

He died of a heart attack on April 23, 2016.
