= 1988 Toronto Argonauts season =

CFL team season

- Head coach: Bob O'Billovich
- Home stadium: Exhibition Stadium

Results
- Record: 14–4
- Division place: 1st, East
- Playoffs: Lost East Final

Uniform

The 1988 Toronto Argonauts finished in first place in the East Division with a 14–4 record. The Argos' appeared in the East Final but lost to the Winnipeg Blue Bombers 27–11. The 1988 season was the team's last season at Exhibition Stadium, they would move into their new stadium, SkyDome, the following year.

== Offseason ==
The Toronto Argonauts drafted the following players in the 1988 CFL draft.

Round	Pick	Player	Position	School
2	15	Paul Masotti	WR	Acadia
3	23	Tommy Kane	WR	Syracuse
4	31	Floyd Salazar	CB/HB	McGill
5	39	Chris Munford	S	Simon Fraser
6	47	Tim Karbonick	SB/TE	Calgary
7	55	Frank Paradiso	ILB	York
8	63	Jamie Williamson	HB	York

== Regular season ==
=== Standings ===
East Division
Pos	Team	Pld	W	L	T	PF	PA	PD	Pts	Div	Stk
1	Toronto Argonauts (C, Q)	18	14	4	0	571	326	245	28	8–2	W7
2	Winnipeg Blue Bombers (Q)	18	9	9	0	407	458	−51	18	3–3	L3
3	Hamilton Tiger-Cats (Q)	18	9	9	0	478	465	13	18	6–4	L1
4	Ottawa Rough Riders	18	2	16	0	278	618	−340	4	1–9	L2

Source: "1988 Regular Season Standings". Archived from the original on 2011-12-01.
(C) First round bye; (Q) Qualified for playoffs

=== Schedule ===
Week	Game	Date	Opponent	Results		Venue	Attendance
Week	Game	Date	Opponent	Score	Record	Venue	Attendance
1	1	July 16	at Hamilton Tiger-Cats	L 24–29	0–1	Ivor Wynne Stadium	13,157
2	2	July 20	vs. Rough Riders	W 34–11	1–1	Exhibition Stadium	20,114
3	3	July 28	vs. BC Lions	W 26–21	2–1	Exhibition Stadium	21,846
4	4	Aug 2	at Ottawa Rough Riders	W 41–7	3–1	Lansdowne Park	24,322
5	5	Aug 11	at BC Lions	W 24–12	4–1	BC Place	29,621
6	6	Aug 16	vs. Hamilton Tiger-Cats	W 19–5	5–1	Exhibition Stadium	25,103
7	7	Aug 26	at Saskatchewan Roughriders	W 23–21	6–1	Taylor Field	24,662
8	8	Aug 31	vs. Calgary Stampeders	W 33–17	7–1	Exhibition Stadium	24,210
8	9	Sept 5	at Hamilton Tiger-Cats	L 28–56	7–2	Ivor Wynne Stadium	18,300
9	10	Sept 9	vs. Saskatchewan Roughriders	L 13–14	7–3	Exhibition Stadium	23,498
10	11	Sept 18	at Edmonton Eskimos	L 21–38	7–4	Commonwealth Stadium	33,549
11	12	Sept 25	vs. Edmonton Eskimos	W 35–22	8–4	Exhibition Stadium	24,104
12	13	Sept 30	at Calgary Stampeders	W 42–25	9–4	McMahon Stadium	18,281
13	14	Oct 8	at Ottawa Rough Riders	W 52–3	10–4	Lansdowne Park	18,527
14	15	Oct 14	vs. Ottawa Rough Riders	W 49–7	11–4	Exhibition Stadium	21,713
15	16	Oct 23	vs. Winnipeg Blue Bombers	W 36–13	12–4	Exhibition Stadium	23,324
16	17	Oct 30	at Winnipeg Blue Bombers	W 22–16	13–4	Winnipeg Stadium	23,557
17	18	Nov 6	vs. Hamilton Tiger-Cats	W 49–9	14–4	Exhibition Stadium	24,503

== Postseason ==
Round	Date	Opponent	Results		Venue	Attendance
Round	Date	Opponent	Score	Record	Venue	Attendance
East Final	November 20	vs. Winnipeg Blue Bombers	L 11–27	0–1	Exhibition Stadium	26,091

== Roster ==
1988 Toronto Argonauts final roster
Quarterbacks: 11 Danny Barrett; 16 John Congemi; 14 Gilbert Renfroe; Running backs: 6 Gill Fenerty; 31 George Ganas; 33 Lorenzo Graham; 34 Ryan Hanson; 37 Warren Hudson; Receivers: 80 Jeff Boyd; 30 Dwight Edwards; 88 Paul Masotti; 75 Pernell Moore; 85 Lee Morris; 25 Paul Nastasiuk; 76 James Noble; 1 Darrell Smith	Offensive linemen: 51 Randy Ambrosie G; 56 Ian Beckstead C; 69 Dan Ferrone G; 63 Jim Kardash T; 66 Kelvin Pruenster T; 65 Chris Schultz T; 64 Bob Skemp G/C; Defensive linemen: 74 Don Baldwin DE; 99 Jearld Baylis DT; 70 Harold Hallman DT; 77 Rodney Harding DT/DE; 68 Glenn Kulka DE; 79 Blaine Schmidt DT; Special teams: 4 Lance Chomyc K; 8 Hank Ilesic P/K	Linebackers: 35 Bruce Elliott; 38 Nolan Harper; 58 Bruce Holmes; 36 Don Moen; 32 Willie Pless; 90 Tony Visco; 38 Ben Zambiasi; Defensive backs: 13 Ed Berry; 7 Carl Brazley; 15 Laurent DesLauriers; 26 Selwyn Drain; 27 Doran Major; 29 Terry Noble; 2 Reggie Pleasant; 18 Floyd Salazar; 24 Jake Vaughan; Italics indicate International player
