= Paul Nastasiuk =

Canadian football player (born 1963)

No. 36, 31, 25
- Position: Slotback

Personal information
- Born: July 11, 1963 (age 63); Newmarket, Ontario, Canada
- Listed height: 6 ft 0 in (1.83 m)
- Listed weight: 195 lb (88 kg)

Career information
- University: Wilfrid Laurier
- CFL draft: 1986: 1st round, 9th overall pick

Career history
- BC Lions (1986–1987); Ottawa Rough Riders (1988); Toronto Argonauts (1988); BC Lions (1989); Toronto Argonauts (1990–1992)

Awards and highlights
- Grey Cup champion (1991)

Paul Gerard Nastasiuk (born July 11, 1963) is a Canadian former professional football player.

Nastasiuk played seven seasons in the Canadian Football League. He won the Grey Cup as a member of the 1991 Toronto Argonauts team.

Nastasiuk was inducted into the Wilfrid Laurier University Golden Hawk Hall of Fame in 2000, and into the Barrie Sports Hall of Fame 2008.

== Family ==
His son, Zach Nastasiuk (born March 30, 1995), was drafted by the Detroit Red Wings in the 2013 NHL Draft, being drafted 48th overall. Zach played junior hockey in the Ontario Hockey League with the Owen Sound Attack, and has played for several minor pro teams.
