= 1988 Calgary Stampeders season =

Canadian football team season

- General manager: Norman Kwong
- Head coach: Larry Kuharich
- Home stadium: McMahon Stadium

Results
- Record: 6–12
- Division place: 4th, West
- Playoffs: did not qualify

The 1988 Calgary Stampeders finished in fourth place in the West Division with a 6–12 record and missed the playoffs.

The next season in which the Stampeders would miss the playoffs would be in 2002.

== Offseason ==
=== CFL draft ===
Round	Pick	Player	Position	School
1	4	Poly Georganos	Tackle	Bishop's
2	12	Chris Bleue	Tight end	Washburn
2	13	Wayne Yearwood	Wide receiver	West Virginia
3	20	Mark McLoughlin	Kicker	South Dakota
4	28	Wally Zatylny	Wide receiver	Bishop's
5	36	Jeff Yausie	Halfback	Saskatchewan
6	44	Steve Watts	Cornerback	Toronto
7	52	Jordan Gagner	Quarterback	UBC
8	60	Ian James	Linebacker	Calgary

== Preseason ==
Game	Date	Opponent	Results		Venue	Attendance
Game	Date	Opponent	Score	Record	Venue	Attendance
A	Tue, June 28	at BC Lions	W 39–27	1–0	BC Place	30,492
B	Tue, July 5	vs. Edmonton Eskimos	L 25–44	1–1	McMahon Stadium	16,676

== Regular season ==
=== Season standings ===
West Division
Pos	Team	Pld	W	L	T	PF	PA	PD	Pts	Div	Stk
1	Edmonton Eskimos (C, Q)	18	11	7	0	477	408	69	22	6–4	W1
2	Saskatchewan Roughriders (Q)	18	11	7	0	525	452	73	22	5–3	W1
3	BC Lions (Q)	18	10	8	0	489	417	72	20	4–4	W3
4	Calgary Stampeders	18	6	12	0	395	476	−81	12	3–7	L1

Source: "CFL.ca". Archived from the original on 2009-10-20.
(C) First round bye; (Q) Qualified for playoffs

=== Season schedule ===
Week	Game	Date	Opponent	Results		Venue	Attendance
Week	Game	Date	Opponent	Score	Record	Venue	Attendance
1	1	Thu, July 14	at Edmonton Eskimos	L 0–33	0–1	Commonwealth Stadium	27,889
2	2	Fri, July 22	at BC Lions	L 31–44	0–2	BC Place	33,147
3	3	Sat, July 30	vs. Hamilton Tiger-Cats	L 20–45	0–3	McMahon Stadium	24,437
4	4	Fri, Aug 5	at Hamilton Tiger-Cats	W 38–14	1–3	Ivor Wynne Stadium	18,112
5	5	Wed, Aug 10	vs. Saskatchewan Roughriders	W 48–10	2–3	McMahon Stadium	23,437
6	6	Sat, Aug 20	at Saskatchewan Roughriders	L 21–24	2–4	Taylor Field	24,265
7	7	Wed, Aug 24	vs. Winnipeg Blue Bombers	L 11–12	2–5	McMahon Stadium	21,012
8	8	Wed, Aug 31	at Toronto Argonauts	L 17–33	2–6	Exhibition Stadium	24,210
8	9	Mon, Sept 5	vs. Edmonton Eskimos	L 11–27	2–7	McMahon Stadium	27,768
9	10	Sat, Sept 10	vs. Ottawa Rough Riders	W 17–16	3–7	McMahon Stadium	16,969
10	11	Sat, Sept 17	at Winnipeg Blue Bombers	W 20–14	4–7	Winnipeg Stadium	25,587
11	12	Fri, Sept 23	vs. BC Lions	W 40–22	5–7	McMahon Stadium	17,578
12	13	Fri, Sept 30	vs. Toronto Argonauts	L 25–42	5–8	McMahon Stadium	18281
13	14	Sun, Oct 9	at Saskatchewan Roughriders	L 17–47	5–9	Taylor Field	23,224
14	15	Sun, Oct 16	vs. Edmonton Eskimos	L 29–32	5–10	McMahon Stadium	29,430
15	16	Sat, Oct 22	at Ottawa Rough Riders	L 3–19	5–11	Lansdowne Park	16,237
16	17	Sun, Oct 30	vs. Saskatchewan Roughriders	W 28–22	6–11	McMahon Stadium	18,863
17	18	Sun, Nov 6	at Edmonton Eskimos	L 19–20	6–12	Commonwealth Stadium	27,499

== Roster ==
1988 Calgary Stampeders final roster
Quarterbacks: 11 Carl Fodor; 18 Erik Kramer; Running backs: 22 Shawn Faulkner; 33 Jeff Johnson; 34 Andy McVey; 12 Tim Petros; 23 John Williams; Receivers: 71 Jay Christensen; 81 Stacey Dawsey; 88 Tony Dennis; 9 Mike Siroishka; 19 Emanuel Tolbert; 76 Marshall Toner; 89 Larry Willis	Offensive linemen: 59 Leo Blanchard T; 51 Rodney Lossow G; 69 Sean McKeown T; 65 Mike Palumbo C; 67 Rudy Phillips T; 61 Tom Spoletini G; 64 Craig Watson G; Defensive linemen: 84 Gene Belliveau DE; 75 Stu Laird DT; 74 Mitchell Price DT; 79 Greg Reynard DT; 93 Kent Warnock DT; 91 Quency Williams DE; Special teams: 6 Glenn Harper P; 13 Mark McLoughlin K	Linebackers: 49 Frank Balkovec; 37 Matt Finlay; 97 Kenny Ford; 95 Lemont Jeffers; 38 Doug Landry; Defensive backs: 39 Bruno Geremia; 14 Larry Hogue; 15 Ron Hopkins; 32 Darcy Kopp; 20 Chris Major; 3 David McCrary; 24 Greg Peterson; 21 Derrick Taylor; 36 Jeff Yausie; Injured list: 72 Bernie Morrison LB; Italics indicate International player
