= Leo Ezerins =

Canadian gridiron football player (born 1956)

No. 72
- Position: Linebacker/Tight end

Personal information
- Born: August 10, 1956 (age 70); Winnipeg, Manitoba, Canada

Career information
- College: Whitworth University

Career history
- 1978–1982: Winnipeg Blue Bombers
- 1983–1987: Hamilton Tiger-Cats

Awards and highlights
- Grey Cup champion (1986); CFL East All-Star (1986)

Career CFL statistics
- Games played: 173
- Sacks: 13
- Interceptions: 25
- Receptions: 23

Leo Ezerins (born August 10, 1956) was a linebacker who played ten seasons in the Canadian Football League (CFL) for the Winnipeg Blue Bombers and the Hamilton Tiger-Cats.

== Background ==
Ezerins is a graduate of Whitworth College in Spokane, Washington graduating with a BA in Economics and Business. He was a conference all-star four times and an NAIA All American. His head coach was CFL legend, Hugh Campbell.

He was also a three-time Canadian Champion Speed Skating Champion, Provincial High School basketball All-Star twice, played on the Isaac Brock Provincial Little League Championship team, and the Winnipeg Hawkeyes Juvenile Little Grey Cup Championship team.

== Professional career ==
Ezerins is currently the all-time interception leader for Canadian linebackers and fifth overall for all CFL linebackers with 25 interceptions. He also has 23 receptions as a tight end. He was an integral member of the Tiger-Cats 1986 Grey Cup winning team. He recovered the first fumble of the game caused by Grover Covington which set the pace for an incredible defensive onslaught of the heavily favored Edmonton Eskimos. That year, he was named a CFL Eastern All-Star.

== Awards ==
- Named – #46 Globe and Mail Sports Power 50 – 2011
- Named – Honorary Member Princess Patricia Canadian Light Infantry – 2011
- Named- Leo Ezerins Award – Isaac Brock Community Center, Winnipeg, MB - 2010

== Life After Retirement ==
Ezerins is the poster boy for a University Health Network study on the effect of head hits on CFL players to be studied for long term concussion effects. Ezerins helps promote concussion awareness for all sports.

== Personal ==
A Winnipeg native, Ezerins now calls Hamilton Home with his life partner Sandra Shields. He has two adult children, Katie and Dillon. Recently he was named to the Globe and Mail's Power 50, a Member of the 100th Grey Cup Steering Committee, Honorary Member of the PPCLI Foundation, Member of the Canadian Sports Concussion Research Project (Chaired by Dr. Charles Tator), a nominee to the Hamilton Tiger-Cats All Time Team and Manitoba Football Hall of Fame inductee.
