= Tony Hunter (wide receiver) =

American football player (born 1963)

No. 88, 6, 80
- Positions: Wide receiver, return specialist

Personal information
- Born: July 15, 1963 (age 63); Reno, Nevada, U.S.
- Listed height: 5 ft 8 in (1.73 m)
- Listed weight: 160 lb (73 kg)

Career information
- High school: Hug (Reno)
- College: Boise State
- NFL draft: 1986: undrafted

Career history
- Montreal Alouettes (1986)*; Edmonton Eskimos (1989); Calgary Stampeders (1990); BC Lions (1990–1991); Edmonton Eskimos (1992)*; BC Lions (1993)*
- * Offseason or practice squad member only

Awards and highlights
- CFL All-Star (1989); CFL West All-Star (1989)

Anthony Hunter (born July 15, 1963) is an American former professional football wide receiver who played in the Canadian Football League (CFL). He played college football at Boise State.

== Early life ==
Anthony Hunter was born on July 15, 1963, in Reno, Nevada. He attended Hug High School in Reno.

== College career ==
Hunter first played college football for the Nevada Wolf Pack of the University of Nevada, Reno in 1982. He returned a kickoff 84 yards in the 1982 season opener but his playing time soon decreased. He played at Merced Junior College in 1983.

Hunter was then a two-year letterman for the Boise State Broncos from 1984 to 1985. He finished his two-year Boise State career with totals of 57 receptions for 996 yards and 12 touchdowns, 19 kick returns for 453 yards, and 12 punt returns for 43 yards.

== Professional career ==
After going undrafted in the 1986 NFL draft, Hunter signed with the Montreal Alouettes of the Canadian Football League (CFL). He was released on June 20, 1986.

After being cut by Montreal, Hunter returned to school and also began working as a computer analyst. He signed with the CFL's Edmonton Eskimos after being discovered at a free agent camp in Los Angeles. He replaced Gizmo Williams as the team's return specialist. Williams spent the 1989 season with the Philadelphia Eagles. Hunter dressed in 17 games for the Eskimos in 1989, returning 118 punts for a CFL single-season record 1,181 yards. He also returned 20 kickoffs for 441 yards, and caught 16 passes for 335 yards and three touchdowns. He earned both CFL All-Star and CFL West All-Star honors for his special teams play during the 1989 season. He was also named the CFL special teams player of the year. He was nicknamed "The Wiz" while with the Eskimos, in reference to Gizmo Williams' nickname of "The Giz". Williams returned to the Eskimos in 1990 and Hunter was released on July 6, 1990, before the start of the regular season.

The Winnipeg Sun reported that Hunter was in attendance at a Blue Bombers game and it was believed that he would soon sign with the team. However, a few days later, he instead signed with the Calgary Stampeders, surprising Blue Bombers head coach Mike Riley. Williams reportedly signed with Calgary to get more playing time at wide receiver. He played in two games for the Stampeders, recording two receptions for 17 yards, 12 punt returns for 110 yards, and seven kickoff returns for 157 yards. He was released in early September 1990 after hogging the ball on kick returns from fellow returner Derrick Crawford.

Hunter then signed with the BC Lions of the CFL on September 18, 1990. He returned a punt 108 yards for a touchdown and started at receiver in relief of Larry Willis. Hunter dressed in seven games overall for BC during the 1990 season, catching 14 passes for 149 yards and two touchdowns while also returning 35 punts for 409 yards and one touchdown and nine kickoffs for 149 yards. Hunter started at receiver for the Lions in the 1991 season opener, totaling five receptions for 138 yards and two touchdowns, three kickoff returns for 62 yards, and nine punt returns for 39 yards. However, he also muffed a punt and had a potential punt return touchdown called back due to holding as BC lost to Calgary 39–34. He dressed in four games overall for BC in 1991, recording 12 receptions for 186 yards and two touchdowns, five kickoff returns for 120 yards, and 11 punt returns for 48 yards. Hunter was released in early September 1991 after dropping passes.

Hunter was signed to the Eskimos' practice roster in October 1992. He signed with the Lions' again in 1993 but was released in July before the start of the 1993 regular season.
