= Darren Yewchyn =

American football wide receiver (born 1965)

No. 39
- Position: Wide receiver / Slotback

Personal information
- Born: September 15, 1965 (age 61); Windsor, Ontario, Canada
- Listed height: 5 ft 11 in (1.80 m)
- Listed weight: 195 lb (88 kg)

Career information
- College: Siskiyous (1985–1986)

Career history
- 1987–1989: Winnipeg Blue Bombers

Awards and highlights
- Grey Cup champion (1988)

Darren Yewchyn (born September 15, 1965) is a Canadian former professional football wide receiver who played two seasons with the Winnipeg Blue Bombers of the Canadian Football League (CFL). He played college football at College of the Siskiyous.

== Early life and college ==
Darren Yewchyn was born on September 15, 1965, in Windsor, Ontario. For high school, he first attended Miles Macdonell Collegiate in Winnipeg, Manitoba before transferring to River East Collegiate in Winnipeg.

He played college football at the College of the Siskiyous from 1985 to 1986, spending time at both tailback and outside linebacker.

== Professional career ==
Yewchyn signed with the Winnipeg Blue Bombers of the Canadian Football League (CFL) on May 19, 1987. He began the 1987 season on the practice roster but was later activated to play special teams. Overall, he played in six games for the Blue Bombers that year, recovering a blocked punt for 22 yards and returning one kick for one yard before fumbling the ball. His blocked punt recovery set up the game-winning field goal in the 24–23 victory over the Toronto Argonauts on November 1, 1987. Yewchyn was initially listed as a slotback that season before switching to safety.

Yewchyn played in 14 games during the 1988 season, totaling one tackle and one fumble recovery for 17 yards. He was listed as a wide receiver that season. The Blue Bombers finished the year with a 9–9 record and eventually advanced to the 76th Grey Cup, where they beat the BC Lions by a score of 22–21.

Yewchyn did not appear in any games in 1989, spending time on both the injured list and practice roster. He was released by the Blue Bombers in late June 1990 before the start of the 1990 CFL season.

== Personal life ==
After his football career, Yewchyn entered the food truck industry and opened a successful hot dog cart business in Winnipeg.
