= James Hood (disambiguation) =

James Hood (1942–2013), one of the first two African Americans to enroll at the University of Alabama in 1963.

James Hood may also refer to:

- James Hood (Canadian football) (born 1961), American, played in the Canadian Football League
- Jimmy Hood (1948–2017), British politician
- Jim Hood (born 1962), American politician
- James Walker Hood (1831–1918), American Methodist bishop
