= Bryan Illerbrun =

Canadian football player

Profile
- Position: Offensive tackle

Personal information
- Born: April 20, 1957; Gainsborough, Saskatchewan, Canada
- Died: May 16, 2013 (aged 56)

Career history
- 1978–1983: Saskatchewan Roughriders
- 1984–1986: BC Lions
- 1986–1989: Saskatchewan Roughriders
- 1990–1991: Ottawa Rough Riders

Awards and highlights
- 2× Grey Cup champion (1985, 1989)

Bryan Illerbrun (April 20, 1957 - May 16, 2013) was a professional Canadian football offensive lineman who played fourteen seasons in the Canadian Football League (CFL) for three teams. He was a part of the BC Lions' Grey Cup victory in 1985 and the Saskatchewan Roughriders' Grey Cup victory in 1989.
