= Tim Jessie =

American football player (born 1963)

No. 21
- Position: Running back

Personal information
- Born: March 1, 1963 (age 63); Opp, Alabama, U.S.
- Listed height: 5 ft 11 in (1.80 m)
- Listed weight: 190 lb (86 kg)

Career information
- College: Auburn
- NFL draft: 1987: 11th round, 305 (By the Chicago Bears)th overall pick

Career history
- 1987: Washington Redskins
- 1988–1992: Winnipeg Blue Bombers

Awards and highlights
- 2× Grey Cup champion (1988, 1990)
- Stats at Pro Football Reference

Timothy LaWayne Jessie (born March 1, 1963) is a former gridiron football running back in the National Football League (NFL) for the Washington Redskins and in the Canadian Football League (CFL) for the Winnipeg Blue Bombers. He played college football at Auburn University and was drafted by the Chicago Bears in the eleventh round of the 1987 NFL draft with the 305th overall pick.

Pre-draft measurables
| Height | Weight | Arm length | Hand span | Bench press |
|---|---|---|---|---|
| 5 ft 11 1/4 in (1.81 m) | 190 lb (86 kg) | 31 1/4 in (0.79 m) | 9 1/2 in (0.24 m) | 12 reps |
All values from NFL Combine
