= Bennie Thompson (gridiron football) =

American gridiron football player and coach (born 1963)

No. 37, 46
- Positions: Safety, special teamer

Personal information
- Born: February 10, 1963 (age 63); New Orleans, Louisiana, U.S.
- Listed height: 6 ft 0 in (1.83 m)
- Listed weight: 220 lb (100 kg)

Career information
- High school: John McDonogh (New Orleans, Louisiana)
- College: Grambling State (1981–1984)
- NFL draft: 1985: undrafted

Career history

Playing
- Kansas City Chiefs (1985)*; Winnipeg Blue Bombers (1986–1988); New Orleans Saints (1989–1991); Kansas City Chiefs (1992–1993); Cleveland Browns (1994–1995); Baltimore Ravens (1996–1999)
- * Offseason or practice squad member only

Coaching
- Baltimore Ravens (2000–2005) Assistant special teams coach

Awards and highlights
- Super Bowl champion (XXXV); 2× First-team All-Pro (1991, 1998); 2× Pro Bowl (1991, 1998); CFL All-star (1988)

Career NFL statistics
- Tackles: 162
- Interceptions: 7
- Fumble recoveries: 5
- Stats at Pro Football Reference

Bennie Thompson (born February 10, 1963) is an American former professional football player who was a safety in the National Football League (NFL) and Canadian Football League (CFL). He went to the Pro Bowl after the 1991 and 1998 seasons as a special teams player. Thompson played for the Winnipeg Blue Bombers of the CFL and the New Orleans Saints, Kansas City Chiefs, Cleveland Browns, and Baltimore Ravens of the NFL. Thompson is best known for his special teams contributions.

== College career ==
He played at Grambling.

== Professional career ==
=== New Orleans Saints ===
He signed with the team after his three-year stint in the Canadian Football League. In 1991, he was selected to the Pro Bowl as a special teamer.

=== Kansas City Chiefs ===
He spent two seasons in Kansas City. In 1992, Thompson recorded a career high 4 interceptions.

=== Cleveland Browns ===
He played in Cleveland for two seasons and was coached by Bill Belichick. He tied for the team lead in special teams tackles with 21 in 1994.

=== Baltimore Ravens ===
He played in Baltimore in four seasons. In 1998, he was selected to the Pro Bowl as a special teamer. It was his second career Pro Bowl selection.

In 1999, he led the team with 24 special teams tackles.
