= Ian Beckstead =

Canadian gridiron football player (born 1957)

Profile
- Position: Centre

Personal information
- Born: September 7, 1957 (age 69); Ottawa, Ontario, Canada

Career information
- High school: Ridgemont High School (Ottawa)
- CJFL: Ottawa Sooners
- College: Richmond
- CFL draft: 1981

Career history
- 1981–1983: Ottawa Rough Riders
- 1983–1985: Toronto Argonauts
- 1987–1992: Toronto Argonauts

Awards and highlights
- 2× Grey Cup champion (1983, 1991); CFL All-Star (1988)

Ian Beckstead (born September 7, 1957) is a former Canadian Football League (CFL) offensive lineman who played eleven seasons in the CFL. He was part of the Grey Cup championship-winning Toronto Argonauts in 1983 and 1991. He won the Leo Dandurand Trophy in 1988.

Beckstead was originally drafted by the Ottawa Rough Riders in 1981, and was subsequently traded to the Toronto Argonauts in 1983. He sat out part of the 1985 season and all of 1986 to complete his Master of Business Administration degree and begin working in business, but returned to the Argonauts in the 1987 season and played with them for the remainder of his career until retiring after the 1992 season. He was named an East Division All-Star in 1987 and 1988, and a league all-star in 1988. In the latter year, he won the Leo Dandurand Trophy as the Outstanding Offensive Lineman in the East, but lost to West Division's Roger Aldag for the league-wide award.
