= Fred Glick =

American football player and coach (born 1937)

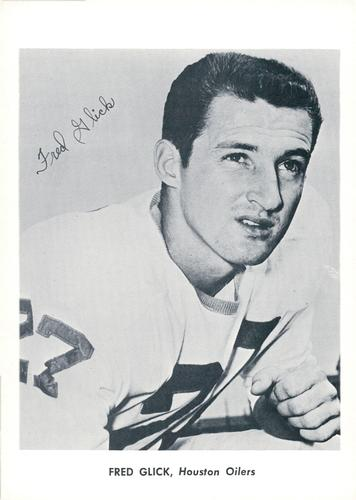

No. 33, 27
- Position: Safety

Personal information
- Born: February 25, 1937 (age 89); Aurora, Colorado, U.S.
- Listed height: 6 ft 1 in (1.85 m)
- Listed weight: 195 lb (88 kg)

Career information
- High school: Poudre (Fort Collins, Colorado)
- College: Colorado State
- NFL draft: 1959: 23rd round, 266th overall pick

Career history

Playing
- Chicago / St. Louis Cardinals (1959–1960); Houston Oilers (1961-1966)

Coaching
- Norfolk Neptunes (1967) Assistant coach; St. Louis Cardinals (1978–1979) Defensive backs coach; New Orleans Saints (1980) Defensive backs coach; New York Giants (1981–1982) Defensive backs coach; Winnipeg Blue Bombers (1983–1986) Linebackers coach; Ottawa Rough Riders (1987–1988) Head coach

Awards and highlights
- AFL champion (1961); Grey Cup champion (1984); 3× AFL All-Star (1962, 1963, 1964); Colorado State University Athletics Hall of Fame

Career NFL/AFL statistics
- Interceptions: 30
- Touchdowns: 1
- Sacks: 6.5
- Stats at Pro Football Reference

Head coaching record
- Regular season: 3–18–0 (.143)

Frederick Couture Glick Jr. (born February 25, 1937) is an American former football player and coach. Glick played professionally as a safety in the National Football League (NFL) for the Chicago/St. Louis Cardinals and the American Football League (AFL) with the Houston Oilers. He played college football for the Colorado State Rams. He set the AFL record for most interceptions in a season with 12 in 1963; and is generally believed to hold the AFL record for most tackles in a single game with 27 in 1962.

== Early life ==
Glick was born on February 25, 1937, in Aurora, Colorado. Glick was the youngest of four brothers (Ivan, Gary and Leon). Gary Glick would go on to play professional football. After some time spent in Lakewood, Colorado, the family moved to a dairy farm in Laporte, Colorado when Glick was in the fourth grade, located near Fort Collins, Colorado. He attended Laporte High School (which later merged into Poudre High School in Fort Collins).

He starred in football, basketball and track in high school. He played quarterback on Laporte's football team from 1952 to 1954. His brother Leon played on the same team in 1952, at fullback. The 1952 team won their conference football championship, and reached the state Class B semifinals. As a senior quarterback in 1954, Fred Glick was 6 ft 1 in (1.85 m) 158 lb (71.7 kg).

== College career ==
Glick entered college in 1955, at the Colorado State College of Agricultural and Mechanic Arts (then known as Colorado A&M and later Colorado State University) in Fort Collins. Laporte's proximity to Fort Collins made it the place Glick wanted to play football, and his brothers Ivan (class of 1951), Gary (class of 1956) and Leon (class of 1957) went before him in attending Colorado State and playing football for the Aggies. He was on the varsity football team from 1956 to 1958. He played his final two years at quarterback, and was also an outstanding defensive back during his years on Colorado State's team.

As a sophomore running back in 1956, he had only eight rushing attempts, and one 43 yard pass reception. In 1957, Glick's junior year, the school's name was changed to Colorado State University. He shared quarterback duties that season, passing for 173 yards and rushing for 97 yards. The team was 3–7.

As a senior in 1958, Glick was the primary quarterback, leading the team to a 6–4 record. He passed for 380 yards, with four touchdowns and three interceptions, while also rushing for 213 yards and three touchdowns.

On November 22, 1958, Glick led Colorado State to a last-minute upset win over their heavily favored archrival, the Colorado University Buffaloes, 15–14. The teams' rivalry stretched back to 1892, having met 58 times before the 1958 game, with Colorado winning 43 of those games. In 1955, Gary Glick had scored all 10 points in the Aggies shutout of the Buffaloes, their only other win of the decade against the Buffaloes. Fred Glick played on both offense, as quarterback, as well as defensive back in the 1958 game. His passing led the team on an 80-yard touchdown drive in the final four minutes, the touchdown coming on a 24-yard touchdown pass. He was also the game's standout defensive player. The 1958 rivalry game against Colorado was the last of original version of the game played for 25 years, as the two teams did not meet again until 1983.

He was selected to play in the 1958 Copper Bowl.

== Football career ==
=== National Football League ===
The Chicago Cardinals selected Glick in the 23rd round of the 1959 NFL draft, 266th overall. He appeared in one game for the Cardinals in 1959, and then four games for the St. Louis Cardinals in 1960, starting one. The Cardinals had moved to St. Louis in March 1960. That was his last season with the Cardinals. He joined the Minnesota Vikings in their 1961 training camp, but was released in early September 1961 before their inaugural season began.

=== Houston Oilers ===
At the end of September 1961, the American Football League's (AFL) Houston Oilers signed Glick. He played the remainder of his career (1961-66) with the Oilers. In 1961, Glick appeared in 12 Oilers games, starting eight at free safety. Glick had four interceptions and 2.5 quarterback sacks during the season. The Oilers defeated the San Diego Chargers in the 1961 AFL Championship Game, 10–3. In the championship game, Glick intercepted a pass in the end zone thrown by future Hall of Fame quarterback Jack Kemp, stopping any scoring opportunity on that drive by the Chargers.

In 1962, Glick started 14 games at strong safety. He had three interceptions. In addition, he returned 12 punts for 79 yards, and returned one kickoff. He was selected to play in the 1962 AFL All-Star Game. In a 1962 game against the Buffalo Bills, he was credited with 27 tackles, which is most likely the AFL single game record. The Oilers again reached the AFL Championship Game, losing to the Dallas Texans (later the Kansas City Chiefs), 20–17.

Glick's best season came in 1963. He started all 14 games at free safety, with 12 interceptions, and three fumble recoveries. In the season's second game, against the Denver Broncos, he had a 15-yard interception return for a touchdown. His 12 interceptions are an AFL single season record, tied for the most in AFL history with Dainard Paulson (12 interceptions with the 1964 New York Jets); and tied for third most in NFL history.

Glick returned 19 punts for 171 yards and 14 kickoffs for 451 yards in 1963. His 9.0 yards per punt return was third best in the AFL and his 22.6 yards per kickoff return was sixth best in the AFL. He was again named an All-Star. Glick was selected first-team All-AFL by The Sporting News, the Associated Press (AP), United Press International (UPI) and the Newspaper Enterprise Association (NEA), among other entities. He was described that season as a “deadly tackler” and the best in the AFL at the safety blitz.

Glick again started all 14 games at free safety in 1964. He had five interceptions and one sack. He returned six punts for 32 yards, and returned one kickoff. He was selected to play in the AFL All-Star game for a third consecutive year. He was named first-team All-AFL by The Sporting News, and second-team All-AFL by the NEA. He was selected the Oilers' most valuable player in 1964.

In 1965 and 1966, Glick (defensive) was elected along with George Blanda (offensive) as Oilers co-captains. In 1965, he started 10 games at free safety, with two interceptions, and returned seven punts for 44 yards. In 1966, he started nine games at free safety, with four interceptions, one fumble recovery and one sack. He missed the last three games of the 1966 season after suffering an injury.

After suffering a back injury in the 1966 season, Glick had back surgery in late January 1967. Just a few weeks later, the 29-year old Glick announced his retirement as a player. Glick told Oilers' coach Wally Lemm that his physical condition precluded future play.

Glick was among the eight team representatives that formed the first AFL players association in January 1964. Glick served as the Oilers' player representative for three years.

== Legacy and honors ==
In May 1959, Colorado State University presented Glick with the Nye Trophy, given to the school's top senior athlete. Gary Glick had been awarded this honor in 1956.

In 1991, Glick joined his brother Gary in the Colorado State University Athletics Hall of Fame.

In 2009, Glick was voted by the fans as the starting safety on the "All-Time Houston Oilers Dream Team". In 2019, the NFL's 100th season, one poll ranked Glick as the 52nd best player in Houston Oilers/Tennessee Titans history.

== Coaching career ==
Glick's first coaching job came in 1967 as an assistant coach/defensive coordinator with the Norfolk Neptunes of the Continental Football League. His college coaching career began as the defensive backfield coach at New Mexico State University in 1968. In 1969, Glick was hired as a defensive backfield coach by University of Arizona head coach Bob Weber, who was Glick's classmate at Colorado State in 1956. Glick coached at Arizona from 1969 to 1972. Gary Glick joined the Arizona coaching staff in 1972, as an offensive backs coach. In January 1973, Glick was hired as a defensive backfield coach by Frank Kush at Arizona State University (ASU). He coached at ASU until 1977.

Glick began his NFL coaching career in April 1978 when he was hired by St. Louis Cardinals' head coach Bud Wilkinson to join his staff as a defensive backs coach. Glick held that position in 1978 and 1979. Wilkinson was replaced by Jim Hanifan in early 1980, and Hanifan did not retain Glick. Glick was then hired as defensive backs coach by the New Orleans Saints in 1980. He was next hired as the defensive backs coach for the New York Giants in 1981 and 1982, under head coach Ray Perkins and defensive coordinator Bill Parcells. While with the Giants, Glick also coached on the defensive side with Bill Belichick, who was the Giants special teams coach and a defensive assistant coach to Parcells and Perkins.

From 1983 to 1986, Glick was the linebackers coach of the Winnipeg Blue Bombers of the Canadian Football League (CFL). He also served briefly as interim head coach in 1985. Glick was head coach for the CFL's Ottawa Rough Riders from 1987 to 1988.

== Personal life ==
At the time he graduated Colorado State, Glick was married with three children.

By the 1970s, while still coaching, he and brother Gary were partners in the Glick Brothers Trailer Park in Fort Collins, and owners of other properties in Colorado and Wyoming. After coaching, he returned to Fort Collins to help run the family business.

== See also ==
- List of American Football League players
