= Brothers Green =

Sibling cooking duo

Brothers Green was the Brooklyn-based cooking duo of brothers Josh and Mike Greenfield. Brothers Green formerly hosted an online cooking show Brothers Green Eats on YouTube and a cooking and music TV show with MTV international that airs in over 90 countries around the world. In 2019, Brothers Green announced their split as a creative team, with Josh starting a new, less food-focused YouTube channel and Mike keeping and rebranding the Brothers Green channel.

== Origins ==
Josh (born 1985) and Mike (born 1988) grew up in Philadelphia, Pennsylvania in a Jewish family.

Josh was a high school football star but declined to play college football so that he could focus on his studies. He attended University of Delaware and graduated in 2007. He formed a band, The Canon Logic, with his friends and relocated to Brooklyn. After college, Josh began providing custom weekly cuisines to friends and neighbors.

Meanwhile, Mike was attending the University of Pittsburgh where he was studying architecture, and began to host catered events and small dinner parties for his friends to test his skills and hone his craft.

After graduation, Mike moved to Brooklyn with Josh where they started Brothers Green.

== Blogging and vlogging ==
Mike and Josh started documenting their culinary jobs and experiments online. Mike started taking photographs of his daily food creations on Everyday Appetite while Josh was writing about his various food experiences on his blog called YIEatN which covered such topics as creative cooking and music.

Their comical attitude and chemistry in the kitchen lent itself to home videos, and with the help of their film-making roommate, became their first cooking show, YuNork which parodied the opening credits to Dexter.

== Success ==
In 2011 Rachael Ray approached Brothers Green for a burger cook-off on her show where they competed for Nick Jonas. In the summer of 2012, Brothers Green was profiled by DnaInfo.

Followed by New York Magazine's Grub Street. In 2012, Mike and Josh executed contracts to star in their own cooking show on YouTube's Hungry Channel. On November 19, 2013 Josh and Mike competed in Food Network's Chopped. Josh was eliminated in the appetizer round, Mike was eliminated in the entree round.

The Brothers Green finished taping their first television show with MTV international which came out in the spring of 2015.
