= Jason Riley (Canadian football) =

Canadian football player (born 1958)

No. 58
- Position: Guard

Personal information
- Born: October 4, 1958 (age 68); Scarborough, Ontario, Canada
- Listed height: 6 ft 3 in (1.91 m)
- Listed weight: 290 lb (132 kg)

Career information
- University: British Columbia
- CFL draft: 1983: 1st round, 7th overall pick

Career history
- 1983: Winnipeg Blue Bombers
- 1984: Saskatchewan Roughriders
- 1984–1993: Hamilton Tiger-Cats

Awards and highlights
- Grey Cup champion (1986); CFL All-Star (1989); 4× CFL East All-Star (1986, 1988, 1989, 1992); Charlotte Simmons Humanitarian Award (1986); Tiger-Cats Walk of Fame Inductee (1995)

Jason Riley (born October 4, 1958) is a Canadian former professional football offensive lineman.

Riley played college football at the University of British Columbia. Riley played eleven seasons in the Canadian Football League (CFL) for three different teams. He was named CFL All-Star in 1989, and was a part of a Grey Cup championship team with the Hamilton Tiger-Cats in 1986. He also won the award for the Ticats Most Outstanding linesman in 1989 and 1992. He retired from the CFL in 1993.

After his retirement Riley taught at Notre Dame High School in Burlington, Ontario. Riley has coached offensive line at McMaster University for 18 yrs. Riley is married and has 3 children. Riley was named Master Instructor of Offensive Line for Ontario by the Ontario Football Alliance in 2010.
