= James Hood (Canadian football) =

American gridiron football player (born 1961)

Profile
- Position: Wide receiver

Personal information
- Born: September 9, 1961 (age 65); Los Angeles, California, USA

Career information
- College: Arizona State University

Career history
- 1985: Winnipeg Blue Bombers
- 1986: Montreal Alouettes
- 1987: Ottawa Rough Riders
- 1988: Saskatchewan Roughriders

Awards and highlights
- CFL All-Star (1986); Jeff Russel Memorial Trophy (1986)

James Hood is a former award-winning receiver in the Canadian Football League.

A graduate of Arizona State University, Hood came to Canada in 1985 and played with the Winnipeg Blue Bombers where he caught 25 passes in 5 games. He moved to the Montreal Alouettes in 1986, where in 18 games he caught 95 passes for 1411 yards and two touchdowns, winning the Jeff Russel Memorial Trophy as best player in the East and was named an all star. 1987 found him with the Ottawa Rough Riders, where in 9 games he hauled in 39 passes. He finished his career in 1988 with the Saskatchewan Roughriders.
