= 1988 CFL season =

Canadian Football League season

- Duration: July 12 – November 6, 1988
- East champions: Winnipeg Blue Bombers
- West champions: BC Lions

76th Grey Cup
- Date: November 27, 1988
- Venue: Lansdowne Park, Ottawa
- Champions: Winnipeg Blue Bombers

CFL seasons
- ← 1987 1989 →

Canadian Football League team locations: West, East

The 1988 CFL season is considered to be the 35th season in modern-day Canadian football, although it is officially the 31st Canadian Football League season.

== CFL news in 1988 ==
The Canadian Football Network reached an agreement with the CFL to extend its network for two more seasons.

Game rosters were revised to consist of 20-Non Imports, 14-Imports and 2-Quarterbacks. The reserve list was lowered from 4 players to 2 players. In addition, if a team decided to dress 14-Imports, one of those imports had to be designated as a special teams player.

On June 23, the CFL All-Stars defeated the Edmonton Eskimos in the CFL All-Star Game in Edmonton, 17–4. Although the contest attracted an All-Star record 27,573 fans, no such game has been held since then.

On Monday, December 12, the CFL Board of Governors appointed Roy McMurty as Chairman/Chief Executive Officer and Bill Baker as President/Chief Operating Officer, succeeding Douglas Mitchell as the league's commissioner (both McMurtry and Baker served as the league's de facto co-commissioners for the 1989 season). Their appointments were confirmed on Sunday, January 1, 1989. The CFL Board of Governors also approved the sale of the Toronto Argonauts from Carling O'Keefe Breweries to Harry Ornest.

== Regular season standings ==
=== Final regular season standings ===
West Division
Pos	Team	Pld	W	L	T	PF	PA	PD	Pts	Div	Stk
1	Edmonton Eskimos (C, Q)	18	11	7	0	477	408	69	22	6–4	W1
2	Saskatchewan Roughriders (Q)	18	11	7	0	525	452	73	22	5–3	W1
3	BC Lions (Q)	18	10	8	0	489	417	72	20	4–4	W3
4	Calgary Stampeders	18	6	12	0	395	476	−81	12	3–7	L1

Source: "CFL.ca". Archived from the original on October 20, 2009.
(C) First round bye; (Q) Qualified for playoffs

East Division
Pos	Team	Pld	W	L	T	PF	PA	PD	Pts	Div	Stk
1	Toronto Argonauts (C, Q)	18	14	4	0	571	326	245	28	8–2	W7
2	Winnipeg Blue Bombers (Q)	18	9	9	0	407	458	−51	18	3–3	L3
3	Hamilton Tiger-Cats (Q)	18	9	9	0	478	465	13	18	6–4	L1
4	Ottawa Rough Riders	18	2	16	0	278	618	−340	4	1–9	L2

Source: "1988 Regular Season Standings". Archived from the original on December 1, 2011.
(C) First round bye; (Q) Qualified for playoffs

Edmonton and Toronto have first round byes.

== Grey Cup playoffs ==
The Winnipeg Blue Bombers are the 1988 Grey Cup champions, defeating the BC Lions 22–21, at Ottawa's Lansdowne Park. This was the first Grey Cup game between two teams from west of Ontario, and the first to be won by a team which had only a .500 season. The Blue Bombers' James Murphy (WR) was named the Grey Cup's Most Valuable Player on Offence and Michael Gray (DT) was named Grey Cup's Most Valuable Player on Defence, while Bob Cameron (P) was named the Grey Cup's Most Valuable Canadian.

=== Playoff bracket ===
November 13: Division Semifinals
East
E3	Hamilton Tiger-Cats	28
E2	Winnipeg Blue Bombers	35
West
W3	BC Lions	42
W2	Saskatchewan Roughriders	18

November 20: Division Finals
E2	Winnipeg Blue Bombers	27
E1	Toronto Argonauts	11
W3	BC Lions	37
W1	Edmonton Eskimos	19

November 27: 76th Grey Cup @ Lansdowne Park – Ottawa, ON
E2	Winnipeg Blue Bombers	22
W3	BC Lions	21

== CFL leaders ==
- CFL passing leaders
- CFL rushing leaders
- CFL receiving leaders

== 1988 CFL All-Stars ==
=== Offence ===
- QB – Matt Dunigan, BC Lions
- RB – Anthony Cherry, BC Lions
- RB – Gill Fenerty, Toronto Argonauts
- SB – Ray Elgaard, Saskatchewan Roughriders
- SB – Emanuel Tolbert, Calgary Stampeders
- WR – David Williams, BC Lions
- WR – James Murphy, Winnipeg Blue Bombers
- C – Ian Beckstead, Toronto Argonauts
- OG – Roger Aldag, Saskatchewan Roughriders
- OG – Gerald Roper, BC Lions
- OT – Chris Schultz, Toronto Argonauts
- OT – Jim Mills, BC Lions

=== Defence ===
- DT – Mike Walker, Hamilton Tiger-Cats
- DT – Brett Williams, Edmonton Eskimos
- DE – Grover Covington, Hamilton Tiger-Cats
- DE – Bobby Jurasin, Saskatchewan Roughriders
- LB – Danny Bass, Edmonton Eskimos
- LB – Greg Stumon, BC Lions
- LB – Willie Pless, Toronto Argonauts
- CB – Stanley Blair, Edmonton Eskimos
- CB – Reggie Pleasant, Toronto Argonauts
- DB – Selwyn Drain, Toronto Argonauts
- DB – Howard Fields, Hamilton Tiger-Cats
- DS – Bennie Thompson, Winnipeg Blue Bombers

=== Special teams ===
- P – Bob Cameron, Winnipeg Blue Bombers
- K – Dave Ridgway, Saskatchewan Roughriders
- ST – Earl Winfield, Hamilton Tiger-Cats

== 1988 Eastern All-Stars ==
=== Offence ===
- QB – Gilbert Renfroe, Toronto Argonauts
- RB – Orville Lee, Ottawa Rough Riders
- RB – Gill Fenerty, Toronto Argonauts
- SB – Gerald Alphin, Ottawa Rough Riders
- SB – Darrell Smith, Toronto Argonauts
- WR – Earl Winfield, Hamilton Tiger-Cats
- WR – James Murphy, Winnipeg Blue Bombers
- C – Ian Beckstead, Toronto Argonauts
- OG – Nick Bastaja, Winnipeg Blue Bombers
- OG – Jason Riley, Hamilton Tiger-Cats
- OT – Chris Schultz, Toronto Argonauts
- OT – Miles Gorrell, Hamilton Tiger-Cats

=== Defence ===
- DT – Mike Walker, Hamilton Tiger-Cats
- DT – Rodney Harding, Toronto Argonauts
- DE – Grover Covington, Hamilton Tiger-Cats
- DE – Glen Kulka, Toronto Argonauts
- LB – James West, Winnipeg Blue Bombers
- LB – Don Moen, Toronto Argonauts
- LB – Willie Pless, Toronto Argonauts
- CB – James Jefferson, Winnipeg Blue Bombers
- CB – Reggie Pleasant, Toronto Argonauts
- DB – Selwyn Drain, Toronto Argonauts
- DB – Howard Fields, Hamilton Tiger-Cats
- DS – Bennie Thompson, Winnipeg Blue Bombers

=== Special teams ===
- P – Bob Cameron, Winnipeg Blue Bombers
- K – Lance Chomyc, Toronto Argonauts
- ST – Earl Winfield, Hamilton Tiger-Cats

== 1988 Western All-Stars ==
=== Offence ===
- QB – Matt Dunigan, BC Lions
- RB – Anthony Cherry, BC Lions
- RB – Anthony Parker, BC Lions
- SB – Ray Elgaard, Saskatchewan Roughriders
- SB – Emanuel Tolbert, Calgary Stampeders
- WR – David Williams, BC Lions
- WR – Larry Willis, Calgary Stampeders
- C – Mike Anderson, Saskatchewan Roughriders
- OG – Roger Aldag, Saskatchewan Roughriders
- OG – Gerald Roper, BC Lions
- OT – Hector Pothier, Edmonton Eskimos
- OT – Jim Mills, BC Lions

=== Defence ===
- DT – Gary Lewis, Saskatchewan Roughriders
- DT – Brett Williams, Edmonton Eskimos
- DE – Vince Goldsmith, Saskatchewan Roughriders
- DE – Bobby Jurasin, Saskatchewan Roughriders
- LB – Danny Bass, Edmonton Eskimos
- LB – Greg Stumon, BC Lions
- LB – Ken Ford, Calgary Stampeders
- CB – Stanley Blair, Edmonton Eskimos
- CB – Larry Crawford, BC Lions
- DB – Richie Hall, Saskatchewan Roughriders
- DB – Chris Major, Calgary Stampeders
- DS – Don Wilson, Edmonton Eskimos

=== Special teams ===
- P – Jerry Kauric, Edmonton Eskimos
- K – Dave Ridgway, Saskatchewan Roughriders
- ST – Henry Williams, Edmonton Eskimos

== 1988 CFL awards ==
- CFL's Most Outstanding Player Award – David Williams (WR), BC Lions
- CFL's Most Outstanding Canadian Award – Ray Elgaard (SB), Saskatchewan Roughriders
- CFL's Most Outstanding Defensive Player Award – Grover Covington (DE), Hamilton Tiger-Cats
- CFL's Most Outstanding Offensive Lineman Award – Roger Aldag (OG), Saskatchewan Roughriders
- CFL's Most Outstanding Rookie Award – Orville Lee (RB), Ottawa Rough Riders
- CFLPA's Outstanding Community Service Award – Hector Pothier (OT), Edmonton Eskimos
- CFL's Coach of the Year – Mike Riley, Winnipeg Blue Bombers
