= Tony Cherry =

Libyan gridiron football player (born 1963)

No. 23, 24, 4, 20, 10
- Position: Running back

Personal information
- Born: February 8, 1963 (age 63); Tripoli, Libya
- Listed height: 5 ft 7 in (1.70 m)
- Listed weight: 187 lb (85 kg)

Career information
- High school: Victor Valley (Victorville, California, U.S.)
- College: Oregon
- NFL draft: 1986: 9th round, 240th overall pick

Career history
- San Francisco 49ers (1986–1987); BC Lions (1988–1989); Ottawa Rough Riders (1990); Calgary Stampeders (1990); Edmonton Eskimos (1991)

Awards and highlights
- Eddie James Memorial Trophy (1988); CFL All-Star (1988)

Career NFL statistics
- Rushing yards: 107
- Rushing average: 4.5
- Touchdowns: 1
- Stats at Pro Football Reference

Anthony Earl Cherry (born February 8, 1963) is a Libyan former professional football running back who played in the Canadian Football League (CFL) with the B.C. Lions. He was selected in the 1986 NFL draft by the San Francisco 49ers in the ninth round (240th pick) out of the University of Oregon. He is distinguished as being the first Libyan to play in the National Football League (NFL). Cherry's height is 5'7".
