= Earl Winfield =

American gridiron football player (born 1961)

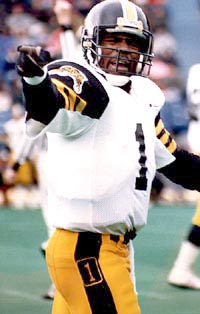
- Photographed at Exhibition Stadium, Toronto, by Mike F. Campbell

No. 1
- Position: Wide receiver

Personal information
- Born: August 6, 1961 (age 65); Petersburg, Virginia, U.S.

Career information
- College: North Carolina

Career history
- 1987–1997: Hamilton Tiger-Cats

Awards and highlights
- 2× CFL All-Star (1988, 1995); 2× CFL East All-Star (1988, 1994); First-team All-ACC (1985)
- Canadian Football Hall of Fame (Class of 2013)

Earl Winfield (born August 6, 1961) is a former Canadian Football League (CFL) wide receiver for the Hamilton Tiger-Cats who, in an 11-year career from 1987 to 1997, caught 573 passes for 10,119 yards and 75 touchdowns.

Winfield played college football at the University of North Carolina at Chapel Hill from 1982 to 1985. He left as the all-time Tar Heel career leader in receptions, with 107.

On February 21, 2013 the Canadian Football Hall of Fame announced that Winfield would be inducted as a player at a ceremony in Edmonton in September, 2013.
