= Bob Cameron (Canadian football) =

Canadian football player (born 1954)

No. 6
- Position: Punter

Personal information
- Born: July 18, 1954 (age 72); Ancaster, Ontario, Canada
- Listed height: 6 ft 0 in (1.83 m)
- Listed weight: 185 lb (84 kg)

Career information
- University: Acadia
- CFL draft: 1977: 1st round, 6th overall pick

Career history
- 1977–1979: Edmonton Eskimos*
- 1980–2002: Winnipeg Blue Bombers
- * Offseason or practice squad member only

Awards and highlights
- 3× Grey Cup champion (1984, 1988, 1990); Dick Suderman Trophy (1988); Manitoba's Male Athlete of the Year (1988); Hec Crighton Trophy (1976); 4× CFL All-Star (1988, 1989, 1990, 1993); 4× CFL East All-Star (1988, 1989, 1990, 1993); CFL West All-Star (1984); CFL record: Most consecutive games played, regular season (353 games, 1980–2000)
- Canadian Football Hall of Fame (Class of 2010)

Robert Cameron (born July 18, 1954) is a Canadian former professional football player who played 23 seasons (1980–2002) with the Winnipeg Blue Bombers of the Canadian Football League (CFL).

Cameron was a quarterback at Acadia University. He won the Hec Crighton Trophy (most outstanding college football player in Canada). Cameron was drafted by the Edmonton Eskimos in the first round of the 1977 College Draft. He was converted to a punter with the Blue Bombers.

Bob Cameron remains the CFL's all-time leading punter with 134,301 regular season punting yards. He was a CFL all-star 4 times, a divisional all-star 6 times, and helped the Bombers to three Grey Cup victories. In the 1988 Grey Cup Cameron was named the game's Most Valuable Canadian for his effective punting in windy conditions. Cameron is also considered the CFL's "iron man" by setting the record for consecutive games played with 353 in a row. One game more than the NFL record of 352 held by Jeff Feagles. In 2005, he was named one of the Blue Bombers 20 All-Time Greats. He was elected into the Canadian Football Hall of Fame in 2010 and the Manitoba Sports Hall of Fame in 2011.

Cameron is the oldest player to play in a gridiron football game at 48 years and 122 days old when he played in his final game (his Bombers lost to the Edmonton Eskimos 30-33 in Edmonton) on November 17, 2002, breaking the record held by George Blanda by thirteen days.
