= David Williams (wide receiver) =

American football player (born 1963)

Profile
- Position: Wide receiver

Personal information
- Born: June 10, 1963 (age 63); Los Angeles, California, U.S.
- Listed height: 6 ft 3 in (1.91 m)
- Listed weight: 190 lb (86 kg)

Career information
- High school: Junípero Serra (Gardena, California)
- College: Illinois
- NFL draft: 1986: 3rd round, 82nd overall pick

Career history
- 1986: Chicago Bears
- 1986: Tampa Bay Buccaneers
- 1987: Los Angeles Raiders
- 1988–1989: BC Lions
- 1990: Ottawa Rough Riders
- 1991: Edmonton Eskimos
- 1991–1992: Toronto Argonauts
- 1993–1995: Winnipeg Blue Bombers

Awards and highlights
- Grey Cup champion (1991); CFL's Outstanding Player Award (1988); Jeff Nicklin Memorial Trophy (1988); CFL All-Star (1988); 2× CFL East All-Star (1991, 1993); 2× CFL West All-Star (1988,1989); 2× Unanimous All-American (1984, 1985); 2× First-team All-Big Ten (1984, 1985); Second-team All-Big Ten (1983)
- Stats at Pro Football Reference
- Canadian Football Hall of Fame
- College Football Hall of Fame

David Lamar Williams (born June 10, 1963) is an American former professional football player who was a wide receiver in the National Football League (NFL) and Canadian Football League (CFL). Williams was named a unanimous All-American twice playing college football for the Illinois Fighting Illini, and is an inducted member of the College Football Hall of Fame as well as the Canadian Football Hall of Fame.

Williams was inducted into the College Football Hall of Fame in 2005.

Williams attended Serra High School in Gardena, California. Williams attended Los Angeles Harbor College where he was a junior college All-American.

== University of Illinois ==
=== Career at Illinois ===
Williams played at Illinois from 1983 to 1985. Under the prolific passing offense of coach Mike White, Williams set many Illinois receiving records, and was a consensus two-time First-team All-American.

In Williams' first season, the 1983 Fighting Illini finished the regular season with a record of 10–1, including a 9–0 mark in Big Ten games. Williams caught 59 passes for 870 yards, with six touchdowns. As Big Ten champions, the Fighting Illini played UCLA in the 1984 Rose Bowl. Williams caught 10 passes for 88 yards in a 45–9 loss.

In 1984, Williams led all NCAA Division I receivers with 101 receptions, 1278 receiving yards, and 9.2 receptions per game. His 101 receptions made Williams the second player in NCAA history to have more than 100 receptions in a season. Williams was a consensus First-team All-American

Williams was again a consensus First-team All-American in 1985. He caught 85 passes for 1047 yards and had eight touchdown receptions in the regular season. Illinois played Army in the 1985 Peach Bowl, and Williams caught seven passes for 109 yards, including touchdown catches of 15 and 54 yards, although Illinois lost by the score of 31–29.

Williams finished his collegiate career as the second leading receiver in NCAA history. In 1990, Williams was named to Illinois' 25-man All-Century Team, chosen as part of the celebration of 100 years of Illinois football.

=== Trivia ===
- Williams is one of three brothers to have played wide receiver at the University of Illinois; along with his brothers Oliver Williams and Steven Williams.
- Williams' position coach at Illinois was future NFL head coach Brad Childress.

=== Awards and recognitions ===
- 1984 First-team All-American by the Associated Press, UPI, American Football Coaches Association, Football Writers Association of America, the Walter Camp Foundation, the Sporting News, and Football News
- 1985 First-team All-American by the Associated Press, UPI, American Football Coaches Association, Football Writers Association of America, the Walter Camp Foundation, and the Sporting News
- 1983 Second-team All-Big Ten by the AP and UPI
- 1984 First-team All-Big Ten by the AP and UPI
- 1985 First-team All-Big Ten by the AP and UPI
- 1984 Illinois Team MVP
- 1985 Illinois Team MVP

=== Illinois records ===
As of 2005 Illinois Football Media Guide

- Most receptions, one game: 16, vs Purdue, October 12, 1985
- Most receptions, season: 101, 1984
- Most receptions, career: 262
- Most receiving yards, season: 1278, 1984
- Most receiving yards, career: 3392
- Most touchdown receptions, season: 10, 1985
- Most touchdown receptions, career: 24
- Most 100-receiving yard games, season: 6, 1984 & 1985 (shared with Brandon Lloyd)
- Most 100-receiving yard games, career: 16
- Most receptions, bowl game: 10, vs UCLA, 1984 Rose Bowl

=== NCAA Division I all-time rankings ===
As of 2005 NCAA Division I Football Record Book

- Career receptions per game: 10th, 7.4
- Season receptions per game: 21st, 9.2, 1984
- Career receptions: 21st, 245
- Season receptions: 24th, 101, 1984

Note: the NCAA does not recognize postseason statistics prior to 2002 in the official records.

=== Illinois statistics ===
Including bowl games

| Season | Receptions | Yards | Touchdowns | Yards/Reception |
|---|---|---|---|---|
| 1983 | 69 | 958 | 6 | 15.7 |
| 1984 | 101 | 1278 | 8 | 12.7 |
| 1985 | 92 | 1156 | 10 | 12.6 |
| Total | 262 | 3392 | 24 | 12.9 |

== National Football League ==
Williams was taken in the third round of the 1986 NFL draft by the Chicago Bears, with the 82nd overall selection. He has the rare distinction of being a 3rd round pick who was cut before the season started. Williams would play two seasons in the National Football League. Williams played for the Tampa Bay Buccaneers in 1986 and the Los Angeles Raiders in 1987, and would finish his NFL career with 10 catches for 195 yards.

== Canadian Football League ==
Williams played seven seasons in the Canadian Football League. He played for the BC Lions in 1988 and 1989, the Ottawa Rough Riders in 1990, the Edmonton Eskimos in 1991, the Toronto Argonauts in 1991 and 1992 and the Winnipeg Blue Bombers from 1993 to 1995. He won the CFL's Outstanding Player Award in 1988, and played in the classic 76th Grey Cup game in 1988, scoring one touchdown. He won a Grey Cup title for the Toronto Argonauts in 1991.

Williams was inducted into the Canadian Football Hall of Fame in 2019.
