= Howard Fields (gridiron football) =

American gridiron football player (born 1958)

Profile
- Position: Cornerback

Personal information
- Born: March 15, 1958 (age 68); Chickasha, Oklahoma, U.S.

Career information
- College: Baylor
- NFL draft: 1980: 12th round, 329th overall pick

Career history
- Hamilton Tiger-Cats (1981–1988); Calgary Stampeders (1989)

Awards and highlights
- Grey Cup champion (1986); 2× CFL All-Star (1985, 1988)

Howard Fields (born March 15, 1958) is an American former professional football cornerback who played in the Canadian Football League (CFL) for nine years. Fields played for the Hamilton Tiger-Cats and Calgary Stampeders from 1981 to 1989. He was a CFL All-Star in 1985 and 1988, and also won the Grey Cup with the Tiger-Cats in 1986. He played college football at Baylor University. He was selected 329th overall by the Philadelphia Eagles in the twelfth round of the 1980 NFL draft.
