= Hector Pothier =

Canadian football player (born 1954)

No. 63
- Position: Offensive tackle

Personal information
- Born: June 12, 1954 (age 72); St. Catharines, Ontario, Canada
- Listed height: 6 ft 3 in (1.91 m)
- Listed weight: 290 lb (132 kg)

Career information
- College: McGill / St. Mary's

Career history
- 1978–1989: Edmonton Eskimos

Awards and highlights
- 6× Grey Cup champion (1978–1982, 1987); CFL All-Star (1981); 4× CFL West All-Star (1981, 1987, 1988, 1989); Tom Pate Memorial Award (1988); J. P. Metras Trophy (1975)

Hector Mark Pothier (born June 12, 1954) is a Canadian former professional football player with the Canadian Football League (CFL)'s Edmonton Eskimos. After playing college football at McGill University and at St. Mary's University (Halifax), Pothier spent his entire 12 year CFL career as an offensive lineman. He was named a CFL All-Star 2 times and was a part of six Grey Cup championship teams with the Eskimos.

During his university career, he was known by his middle name, Mark, to distinguish himself from his father, who was also named Hector, but later decided to use his first name in his father's memory.
