= Brett Williams (defensive lineman) =

American gridiron football player (born 1958)

Profile
- Positions: Defensive end, Defensive tackle

Personal information
- Born: May 23, 1958 (age 68); Norfolk, Virginia, U.S.

Career information
- College: Austin Peay State

Career history
- 1983: Birmingham Stallions – (USFL)
- 1984: Memphis Showboats – (USFL)
- 1985: Montreal Concordes
- 1986: Montreal Alouettes
- 1987: BC Lions
- 1988–1991: Edmonton Eskimos
- 1992–1993: Hamilton Tiger-Cats
- 1994: Shreveport Pirates

Awards and highlights
- James P. McCaffrey Trophy (1986); 3× CFL All-Star (1986, 1988, 1991); CFL East All-Star (1986); 2× CFL West All-Star (1988, 1991)

Brett "the Toaster" Williams (born May 23, 1958) is a former Canadian Football League defensive end who played ten seasons for five different teams, as well as in the now defunct USFL, with Birmingham and Memphis. He was a CFL All-Star three times. He was nicknamed "the Toaster" because he also played offense in short yardage situations, thus he would "burn you on both sides" (of the football). Also after William Perry became famous in late 1985, appliance or kitchen-style nicknames became very popular for athletes such as Gerald McNeil being known as the Ice Cube and NBA player Vinnie Johnson being called the Microwave.
