= Gerald Roper =

Canadian gridiron football player (born 1959)

Profile
- Position: Guard

Personal information
- Born: November 7, 1959 (age 66); Vancouver, British Columbia, Canada

Career information
- College: Arizona

Career history
- 1982–1989, 1992: BC Lions
- 1989–1991: Ottawa Rough Riders

Awards and highlights
- Grey Cup champion (1985); CFL All-Star (1988); CFL East All-Star (1990); 2× CFL West All-Star (1987, 1988)

Gerald Roper (born November 7, 1959) is a Canadian former professional football offensive lineman who played 11 seasons in the Canadian Football League (CFL) for two different teams. He was a part of the BC Lions Grey Cup victory in 1985.
