= Mike Walker (Canadian football) =

American gridiron football player (born 1958)

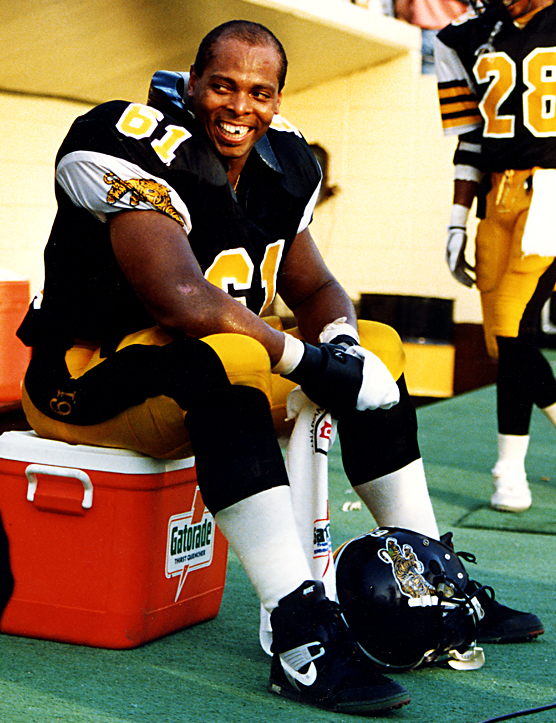
- Walker with the Hamilton Tiger-Cats

Profile
- Position: Defensive tackle

Personal information
- Born: July 5, 1958 (age 68); Indianapolis, Indiana, U.S.

Career information
- College: Washington State

Career history

Playing
- 1982–1989: Hamilton Tiger-Cats
- 1990–1991: Edmonton Eskimos

Coaching
- 2010: Edmonton Eskimos (DL coach)

Awards and highlights
- Grey Cup champion (1986); 3× CFL All-Star (1987, 1988, 1989); 3× CFL East All-Star (1987, 1988, 1989)
- Canadian Football Hall of Fame (Class of 2021)

Mike Walker (born July 5, 1958) is an American former professional football defensive tackle who played ten seasons in the Canadian Football League (CFL). He was a CFL All-Star three times. He was a part of the Hamilton Tiger-Cats 1986 Grey Cup winning team. Since retiring he has been a defensive line coach for the Washington State Cougars, Toronto Argonauts, Edmonton Eskimos and Saskatchewan Roughriders.

He was inducted into the Canadian Football Hall of Fame as a player in 2021.
