= Leo Blanchard =

Canadian football player (born 1955)

No. 59
- Position: Guard

Personal information
- Born: March 12, 1955 (age 71); Edmonton, Alberta, Canada
- Listed height: 6 ft 4 in (1.93 m)
- Listed weight: 260 lb (118 kg)

Career information
- University: Alberta

Career history
- 1979–1987: Edmonton Eskimos
- 1988: British Columbia Lions
- 1988–1991: Calgary Stampeders

Awards and highlights
- 5× Grey Cup champion (1979, 1980, 1981, 1982, 1987); 2× CFL All-Star (1983, 1986); 5× CFL West All-Star (1981, 1982, 1983, 1986, 1990)

Career CFL statistics
- Fumble Recoveries: 2

Leo Blanchard (born March 12, 1955) is a Canadian former professional football offensive lineman who played between 1979 and 1991 in the Canadian Football League (CFL), mainly for the Edmonton Eskimos, but also for the Calgary Stampeders. Blanchard grew up in Edmonton, and played football in high school at Queen Elizabeth Composite High School. Blanchard played Canadian university football for the Alberta Golden Bears between 1977-78. He played for the Eskimos from 1979-87. He was named CFL All-Star every year from 1982 to 1986 and was a part of five Grey Cup championship teams with the Eskimos. He later worked as offensive line coach for the junior Victoria Rebels.
