= Bob Poley =

Canadian football player

No. 57
- Position: Centre

Personal information
- Born: November 15, 1955 (age 70); Saskatoon, Saskatchewan, Canada

Career history
- 1978–1984: Saskatchewan Roughriders
- 1985–1988: Calgary Stampeders
- 1988–1992: Saskatchewan Roughriders

Awards and highlights
- Grey Cup champion (1989); DeMarco–Becket Memorial Trophy (1987); CFL All-Star (1986)

Robert "Pole Cat" or "Polecat" Poley (born November 15, 1955) is a Canadian former professional football offensive lineman who played fifteen seasons in the Canadian Football League (CFL) for two teams. He was named CFL All-Star in 1986. Most of his early life was spent in Prairie River, Saskatchewan, where he first started playing high school football in nearby Hudson Bay, Saskatchewan. He has four children and eight grandchildren.
