= Grover Covington =

American gridiron football player (born 1956)

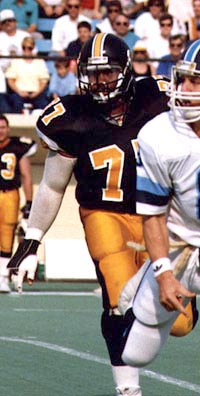
- Covington with the Hamilton Tiger-Cats

No. 77
- Position: Defensive end

Personal information
- Born: March 25, 1956 (age 70); Monroe, North Carolina, U.S.
- Listed height: 6 ft 2 in (1.88 m)
- Listed weight: 235 lb (107 kg)

Career information
- College: Johnson C. Smith

Career history
- 1981–1991: Hamilton Tiger-Cats

Awards and highlights
- Grey Cup champion (1986); Grey Cup Defensive MVP (1986); James P. McCaffrey Trophy (1988); CFL's Most Outstanding Defensive Player Award (1988); 4× CFL All-Star (1985, 1986, 1988, 1989); 4× CFL East All-Star (1985, 1986, 1988, 1989)
- Canadian Football Hall of Fame (Class of 2000)

Grover Covington (born March 25, 1956) is an American former professional football defensive end who played for the Hamilton Tiger-Cats of the Canadian Football League (CFL). He is a member of the Canadian Football Hall of Fame.

== Professional career ==
Covington's career began in 1981 as a free agent signing by the Montreal Alouettes. However a pre-season trade that year sent him to the Hamilton Tiger-Cats, where he played his entire career. Covington was a seven-time CFL All-Star and often led the league in quarterback sacks. He won the Schenley Award for Most Outstanding Defensive Player once and also led the Tiger-Cats to a Grey Cup victory in 1986. He finished his career with 157 sacks, a CFL record. In 1995 Covington was inducted along with former teammate Chet Grimsley into the Johnson C. Smith University Sports Hall of Fame. (Grimsley's 2011 book The White Golden Bull: How Faith in God Transcended Racial Barriers includes a chapter on the relationship between the author, a white student at the historically black university, and Covington.) Covington was inducted into the Canadian Football Hall of Fame in 2000 and, in November 2006, was voted one of the CFL's Top 50 players (#28) of the league's modern era by Canadian sports network TSN.

== Personal life ==
His son, Christian Covington, is also a football player.
