= 1988 Ottawa Rough Riders season =

Canadian football team season

- Head coach: Fred Glick; Bob Weber
- Home stadium: Lansdowne Park

Results
- Record: 2–16
- Division place: 4th, East
- Playoffs: did not qualify

Uniform

The 1988 Ottawa Rough Riders finished the season in fourth place in the East Division with a 2–16 record and failed to qualify for the post-season. In terms of winning percentage (0.111), this was the worst season the franchise had endured since the formation of the Canadian Football League. Additionally, it was the worst record for a Grey Cup host city team as Ottawa hosted the 76th Grey Cup this year. The Rough Riders, which prior to the start of the season promised their fans good things for the coming year, had dubbed the 1988 season "Super season '88".

== Offseason ==
=== CFL draft ===
Rd	Pick	Player	Position	School
1	1	Orville Lee	RB	Simon Fraser
3	22	Leon Hatziioannou	DL	Simon Fraser
4	26	Sheridon Baptiste	WR/HB	Queen's
5	33	Sieg Will	OT/DE	Guelph
5	34	Christopher Rick	OLB	Queen's
6	41	Brent Matich	P/K	Calgary
7	49	Scott Warr	OT	McGill
8	57	Ray Goerke	OT	Weber State

=== Preseason ===
Game	Date	Opponent	Results		Venue	Attendance
Game	Date	Opponent	Score	Record	Venue	Attendance
A	June 29	vs. Winnipeg Blue Bombers	L 25–30	0–1		17,647
B	July 6	at Hamilton Tiger-Cats	W 36–34	1–1		

== Regular season ==
=== Standings ===
East Division
Pos	Team	Pld	W	L	T	PF	PA	PD	Pts	Div	Stk
1	Toronto Argonauts (C, Q)	18	14	4	0	571	326	245	28	8–2	W7
2	Winnipeg Blue Bombers (Q)	18	9	9	0	407	458	−51	18	3–3	L3
3	Hamilton Tiger-Cats (Q)	18	9	9	0	478	465	13	18	6–4	L1
4	Ottawa Rough Riders	18	2	16	0	278	618	−340	4	1–9	L2

Source: "1988 Regular Season Standings". Archived from the original on 2011-12-01.
(C) First round bye; (Q) Qualified for playoffs

=== Schedule ===
Game	Date	Opponent	Results		Venue	Attendance
Game	Date	Opponent	Score	Record	Venue	Attendance
1	July 15	vs. Saskatchewan Roughriders	L 21–48	0–1		22,565
2	July 20	at Toronto Argonauts	L 11–34	0–2		20,114
3	July 27	vs. Edmonton Eskimos	L 28–35	0–3		19,947
4	Aug 2	vs. Toronto Argonauts	L 7–41	0–4		24,322
5	Aug 13	at Winnipeg Blue Bombers	W 28–17	1–4		23,293
6	Aug 18	vs. BC Lions	L 20–27	1–5		24,598
7	Aug 27	at Hamilton Tiger-Cats	L 24–51	1–6		15,067
8	Sept 1	vs. Hamilton Tiger-Cats	L 20–46	1–7		22,535
9	Sept 6	at BC Lions	L 11–24	1–8		25,504
10	Sept 10	at Calgary Stampeders	L 16–17	1–9		16,969
11	Sept 18	at Hamilton Tiger-Cats	L 25–35	1–10		13,024
12	Sept 24	vs. Winnipeg Blue Bombers	L 0–31	1–11		18,523
13	Oct 2	at Edmonton Eskimos	L 12–40	1–12		28,052
14	Oct 8	vs. Toronto Argonauts	L 3–52	1–13		18,527
15	Oct 14	at Toronto Argonauts	L 7–49	1–14		21,513
16	Oct 22	vs. Calgary Stampeders	W 19–3	2–14		16,237
17	Oct 29	vs. Hamilton Tiger-Cats	L 15–23	2–15		16,402
18	Nov 6	at Saskatchewan Roughriders	L 11–45	2–16		25,615

== Roster ==
1988 Ottawa Rough Riders final roster
Quarterbacks: 9 Roy Dewalt; 8 Mike Greenfield; 7 Jeff Wickersham; Running backs: 22 Orville Lee; 33 Larry Mohr; 32 Jim Reid; 19 Robert Reid; Wide receivers: 86 Gerald Alphin; 29 Jerome Erdman DB; 17 Ken Evraire; 84 Darnell Graham; 88 Reggie Ward; 82 Louis Watson; 81 Remi Watson; Tight ends: 73 Mike Hudson	Offensive linemen: 63 Marv Allemang C; 68 Nick Benjamin G; 54 Irv Daymond T; 57 Brad Fawcett T; 53 Leo Groenewegen G; 51 Mark Moors G; 52 Rae Robirtis C; 69 Kari Yli-Renko T; Defensive linemen: 61 Hasson Arbubakrr DE; 83 Michel Bourgeau DT; 89 Mike Cline DE; 43 Johnny Lewis DT; 76 Loyd Lewis DE; 75 Lynn Madsen DE; 24 Dan Sellers DE; 78 Robert Weir DT	Linebackers: 41 Ken Braden; 25 Zeke Gadson; 20 Ben Hummel; 38 Rob Paven; 23 Alex Troop; 35 Pat Wayne; 28 Anthony Woodson; Defensive backs: 27 Rod Brown; 30 Kyle Hall; 21 Will Lewis; 6 Tyrone Pope; 31 Derrick White; 26 Troy Wilson; Special teams: 3 Tom Dixon; Injured list: 79 Rick Wolkensperg SB; Italics indicate International player

== Awards and honours ==
=== CFL awards ===
- CFL's Most Outstanding Rookie Award – Orville Lee (RB)

=== CFL All-Stars ===
- Rod Brown-replacement player
