= 1989 CFL season =

Canadian Football League season

- Duration: July 12 – November 5, 1989
- East champions: Hamilton Tiger-Cats
- West champions: Saskatchewan Roughriders

77th Grey Cup
- Date: November 26, 1989
- Venue: SkyDome, Toronto
- Champions: Saskatchewan Roughriders

CFL seasons
- ← 1988 1990 →

Canadian Football League team locations: West, East

The 1989 CFL season is considered to be the 36th season in modern-day Canadian football, although it is officially the 32nd Canadian Football League season.

== CFL news in 1989 ==
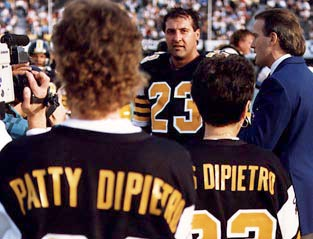
Rocky Dipietro - 1989

The CFL Board of Governors approved the sale of the Hamilton Tiger-Cats from Harold Ballard (of Maple Leaf Gardens Limited) to David Braley on Friday, February 24. In April, the CFL announced a two-year television agreement with Carling O'Keefe Breweries for $12 million plus an additional $3 million for club promotional support.

The CFL hosted both its Annual Meetings and the Canadian College Draft for the second straight year in Hamilton.

The Toronto Argonauts played their first game at the SkyDome. The SkyDome also was the host of the 77th Annual Grey Cup game, on Sunday, November 26, when the Saskatchewan Roughriders defeated the Hamilton Tiger-Cats 43–40.

On September 7, the BC Lions were purchased by Murray Pezim.

The Canadian Interuniversity Athletic Union decided to change the location of the Vanier Cup game, from Varsity Stadium to the SkyDome. The University of Western Ontario defeated the University of Saskatchewan, 35–10 in the Vanier Cup's silver anniversary game.

On Sunday, December 31, Bill Baker decided to resign as the President and Chief Operating Officer of the CFL.

== Regular season standings ==
=== Final regular season standings ===
West Division
Pos	Team	Pld	W	L	T	PF	PA	PD	Pts
1	Edmonton Eskimos (C, Q)	18	16	2	0	644	302	+342	32
2	Calgary Stampeders (Q)	18	10	8	0	495	466	+29	20
3	Saskatchewan Roughriders (Q)	18	9	9	0	547	567	−20	18
4	BC Lions	18	7	11	0	521	557	−36	14

Source: "CFL.ca - Official Site of the Canadian Football League". Archived from the original on November 7, 2009.
(C) First round bye; (Q) Qualified for playoffs

East Division
Pos	Team	Pld	W	L	T	PF	PA	PD	Pts	Div	Stk
1	Hamilton Tiger-Cats (C, Q)	18	12	6	0	519	517	2	24	9–1	W4
2	Toronto Argonauts (Q)	18	7	11	0	369	428	−59	14	5–5	L2
3	Winnipeg Blue Bombers (Q)	18	7	11	0	408	462	−54	14	3–7	L7
4	Ottawa Rough Riders	18	4	14	0	426	630	−204	8	3–7	W2

Source: "CFL.ca - Official Site of the Canadian Football League". Archived from the original on November 7, 2009.
(C) First round bye; (Q) Qualified for playoffs

Edmonton and Hamilton have first round byes.

== Grey Cup playoffs ==
The Saskatchewan Roughriders are the 1989 Grey Cup champions, defeating the Hamilton Tiger-Cats 43–40, at Toronto's SkyDome. This was Saskatchewan's first championship since 1966. The Roughriders' Kent Austin (QB) was named the Grey Cup's Most Valuable Player on Offence and Chuck Klingbeil (DT) was named Grey Cup's Most Valuable Player on Defence, while Dave Ridgway (K) was named the Grey Cup's Most Valuable Canadian.

=== Playoff bracket ===
November 12: Division Semifinals
East
E3	Winnipeg Blue Bombers	30
E2	Toronto Argonauts	7
West
W3	Saskatchewan Roughriders	33
W2	Calgary Stampeders	26

November 19: Division Finals
E3	Winnipeg Blue Bombers	10
E1	Hamilton Tiger-Cats	14
W3	Saskatchewan Roughriders	32
W1	Edmonton Eskimos	21

November 26: 77th Grey Cup @ SkyDome – Toronto, Ontario
E1	Hamilton Tiger-Cats	40
W3	Saskatchewan Roughriders	43

== CFL leaders ==
- CFL passing leaders
- CFL rushing leaders
- CFL receiving leaders

== 1989 CFL All-Stars ==
=== Offence ===
- QB – Tracy Ham, Edmonton Eskimos
- RB – Tim McCray, Saskatchewan Roughriders
- RB – Reggie Taylor, Edmonton Eskimos
- SB – Rocky DiPietro, Hamilton Tiger-Cats
- SB – Craig Ellis, Edmonton Eskimos
- WR – Tony Champion, Hamilton Tiger-Cats
- WR – Don Narcisse, Saskatchewan Roughriders
- C – Rod Connop, Edmonton Eskimos
- OG – Jason Riley, Hamilton Tiger-Cats
- OG – Roger Aldag, Saskatchewan Roughriders
- OT – Miles Gorrell, Hamilton Tiger-Cats
- OT – Chris Walby, Winnipeg Blue Bombers

=== Defence ===
- DT – Harold Hallman, Toronto Argonauts
- DT – Mike Walker, Hamilton Tiger-Cats
- DE – Grover Covington, Hamilton Tiger-Cats
- DE – Stewart Hill, Edmonton Eskimos
- LB – Danny Bass, Edmonton Eskimos
- LB – Eddie Lowe, Saskatchewan Roughriders
- LB – James West, Winnipeg Blue Bombers
- CB – Stanley Blair, Edmonton Eskimos
- CB – Rod Hill, Winnipeg Blue Bombers
- DB – Don Wilson, Edmonton Eskimos
- DB – Enis Jackson, Edmonton Eskimos
- DS – Scott Flagel, Ottawa Rough Riders

=== Special teams ===
- P – Bob Cameron, Winnipeg Blue Bombers
- K – Dave Ridgway, Saskatchewan Roughriders
- ST – Anthony Hunter, Edmonton Eskimos

== 1989 Eastern All-Stars ==
=== Offence ===
- QB – Mike Kerrigan, Hamilton Tiger-Cats
- RB – Gil Fenerty, Toronto Argonauts
- RB – Derrick McAdoo, Hamilton Tiger-Cats
- SB – Rocky DiPietro, Hamilton Tiger-Cats
- SB – Darrell Smith, Toronto Argonauts
- WR – Tony Champion, Hamilton Tiger-Cats
- WR – James Murphy, Winnipeg Blue Bombers
- C – Dale Sanderson, Hamilton Tiger-Cats
- OG – Jason Riley, Hamilton Tiger-Cats
- OG – David Black, Winnipeg Blue Bombers
- OT – Miles Gorrell, Hamilton Tiger-Cats
- OT – Chris Walby, Winnipeg Blue Bombers

=== Defence ===
- DT – Harold Hallman, Toronto Argonauts
- DT – Mike Walker, Hamilton Tiger-Cats
- DE – Grover Covington, Hamilton Tiger-Cats
- DE – Mike Gray, Winnipeg Blue Bombers
- LB – Greg Battle, Winnipeg Blue Bombers
- LB – Frank Robinson, Hamilton Tiger-Cats
- LB – James West, Winnipeg Blue Bombers
- CB – Reggie Pleasant, Toronto Argonauts
- CB – Rod Hill, Winnipeg Blue Bombers
- DB – Ed Berry, Toronto Argonauts
- DB – Stephen Jordan, Hamilton Tiger-Cats
- DS – Scott Flagel, Ottawa Rough Riders

=== Special teams ===
- P – Bob Cameron, Winnipeg Blue Bombers
- K – Paul Osbaldiston, Hamilton Tiger-Cats
- ST – Wally Zatylny, Hamilton Tiger-Cats

== 1989 Western All-Stars ==
=== Offence ===
- QB – Tracy Ham, Edmonton Eskimos
- RB – Tim McCray, Saskatchewan Roughriders
- RB – Reggie Taylor, Edmonton Eskimos
- SB – Jeff Fairholm, Saskatchewan Roughriders
- SB – Craig Ellis, Edmonton Eskimos
- WR – David Williams, BC Lions
- WR – Don Narcisse, Saskatchewan Roughriders
- C – Rod Connop, Edmonton Eskimos
- OG – Dan Ferrone, Calgary Stampeders
- OG – Roger Aldag, Saskatchewan Roughriders
- OT – Blake Dermott, Edmonton Eskimos
- OT – Hector Pothier, Edmonton Eskimos

=== Defence ===
- DT – Brett Williams, Edmonton Eskimos
- DT – James Curry, Saskatchewan Roughriders
- DE – Bobby Jurasin, Saskatchewan Roughriders
- DE – Stewart Hill, Edmonton Eskimos
- LB – Danny Bass, Edmonton Eskimos
- LB – Eddie Lowe, Saskatchewan Roughriders
- LB – Larry Wruck, Edmonton Eskimos
- CB – Stanley Blair, Edmonton Eskimos
- CB – Andre Francis, Edmonton Eskimos
- DB – Don Wilson, Edmonton Eskimos
- DB – Enis Jackson, Edmonton Eskimos
- DS – Glen Suitor, Saskatchewan Roughriders

=== Special teams ===
- P – Brent Matich, Calgary Stampeders
- K – Dave Ridgway, Saskatchewan Roughriders
- ST – Anthony Hunter, Edmonton Eskimos

== 1989 CFL awards ==
- CFL's Most Outstanding Player Award – Tracy Ham (QB), Edmonton Eskimos
- CFL's Most Outstanding Canadian Award – Rocky DiPietro (SB), Hamilton Tiger-Cats
- CFL's Most Outstanding Defensive Player Award – Danny Bass (LB), Edmonton Eskimos
- CFL's Most Outstanding Offensive Lineman Award – Rod Connop (C), Edmonton Eskimos
- CFL's Most Outstanding Rookie Award – Stephen Jordan (DB), Hamilton Tiger-Cats
- CFLPA's Outstanding Community Service Award – Matt Dunigan (QB), BC Lions
- CFL's Coach of the Year – John Gregory, Saskatchewan Roughriders
