= Roger Aldag =

Canadian football offensive lineman (born 1953)

No. 44
- Positions: Guard, Center

Personal information
- Born: October 6, 1953 (age 73); Gull Lake, Saskatchewan, Canada

Career information
- CJFL: Regina Rams

Career history
- 1976–1992: Saskatchewan Roughriders

Awards and highlights
- Grey Cup champion (1989); 2× CFL's Most Outstanding Offensive Lineman Award (1986, 1988); 2× DeMarco–Becket Memorial Trophy (1986, 1988); 5× CFL All-Star (1986–1990); 5× CFL West All-Star (1986–1990); Saskatchewan Roughriders No. 44 retired

Career CFL statistics
- Games played: 271
- Total tackles: 10
- Fumble recoveries: 1
- Canadian Football Hall of Fame (Class of 2002)

Roger Aldag (born October 6, 1953) is a Canadian former professional football offensive lineman who played for the Saskatchewan Roughriders of the Canadian Football League (CFL) from 1976 through 1992. He was part of the Grey Cup championship-winning Roughriders in 1989. Aldag currently holds the Roughrider record for games played with 271 regular season games and 5 play-off games.

Aldag played for the Regina Rams in the Canadian Junior Football League from 1972 to 1975, during which time the Rams won two National Junior Football Championships (1973 and 1975). He was twice named the Rams Most Valuable Player.

During Aldag's time as a member of the Roughriders, he was named to the CFL's Western All-Star team 8 times. He twice received the Schenley Award as the CFL's Outstanding Offensive Lineman. He was also awarded the Mack Truck "Bulldog" award four times. The Mack Truck "Bulldog" award is voted on by opposing players.

Aldag was inducted into the Roughrider Plaza of Honour in 1993. He is a member of the Canadian Football Hall of Fame. His jersey #44 was retired by the team, making him one of only eight players so honoured. He was inducted into the Saskatchewan Sports Hall of Fame in 2006. Aldag was voted one of the CFL's top 50 players (#32) in a poll conducted by Canadian sports network TSN.

Aldag was mentioned in the May 9, 2008 "Get Fuzzy" cartoon by Darby Conley. Satchel notices that Bucky is wearing a CFL hat. (Although not mentioned specifically in the strip, Bucky is wearing a Hamilton Tiger-Cats toque.) Bucky replies that all sports in Canada are puck based. Satchel informs him that football is huge in Canada, and then asks Bucky if he had ever heard of Roger Aldag, since Aldag can't walk down the street in Saskatchewan. Bucky replies that nobody can walk down the street in Saskatchewan since it is covered in ice.

On July 1, 2008 Aldag accompanied the Grey Cup to Kandahar, Afghanistan for the Canada Day celebrations. Members of the Canadian Forces were reportedly thrilled to meet Aldag.

Roger Aldag worked for SaskEnergy in Regina as head of the Land Services department to the delight and humour of his coworkers, who often saw his bobblehead figurine around the office.
