= Stanley Blair =

American gridiron football player (born 1964)

Profile
- Position: Defensive back

Personal information
- Born: July 4, 1964 (age 62); Pine Bluff, Arkansas, U.S.

Career information
- College: Southeastern Oklahoma State University

Career history
- 1986: New Orleans Saints*
- 1987–89: Edmonton Eskimos
- 1990: Phoenix Cardinals
- 1991: San Francisco 49ers*
- * Offseason or practice squad member only

Awards and highlights
- Grey Cup champion (1987); Jackie Parker Trophy (1987); 2× CFL All-Star (1988, 1989)
- Stats at Pro Football Reference

Stanley Blair (born July 4, 1964) is a former all-star and Grey Cup champion Canadian Football League (CFL) cornerback.

Coming out of the Southeastern Oklahoma State University football program, Blair joined the Edmonton Eskimos in 1987 and took the CFL by storm, capturing the Jackie Parker Trophy as best rookie in the West and winning a Grey Cup. His blocked kick in the 75th Grey Cup classic was instrumental. He played two more seasons in Edmonton and was selected as an all-star in each. He was courted by many National Football League teams, but signed with the Phoenix Cardinals and played only 5 games with them before injuries ended his career.
