= 1986 CFL season =

Canadian Football League season

- Duration: June 24 – November 9, 1986
- East champions: Hamilton Tiger-Cats
- West champions: Edmonton Eskimos

74th Grey Cup
- Date: November 30, 1986
- Venue: BC Place, Vancouver
- Champions: Hamilton Tiger-Cats

CFL seasons
- ← 1985 1987 →

Canadian Football League team locations: West, East

The 1986 CFL season is considered to be the 33rd season in modern-day Canadian football, although it is officially the 29th Canadian Football League season.

== CFL news in 1986 ==
The CFL decided that all nine teams will play 18 games each, in the regular season. The playoff structure was revised to allow a fourth place team from one of the divisions to qualify for the playoffs if that fourth place team has earned more points in the regular season standings than the third place team from the other division. Until 1992, however, that team stayed in its own division for the playoffs (the league began American expansion in 1993, changing the rules along the way). The four qualifiers in one division played semi-finals and a final while the two qualifiers in the other division playing a home-and-home, total-points, 2-game playoff (this playoff format was last used in 1972). This was somewhat unfair to the first place team, who might no longer receive a first-round bye based simply on what happened at the bottom of its own division. (The current format, which began in 1997 after the league ceased its American operations, sees a fourth-place qualifier cross-over to the other division, essentially becoming the third-place team in that division.) As it turned out, 1986 was the only year this playoff format was needed.

The Canadian Football League and the Canadian Football League Players Association agreed on a new three-year agreement.

The Concordes changed their name to the Alouettes, coinciding with the 40th anniversary of the founding of the original Montreal Alouettes.

The Sports Network started to carry live coverage of the first round of the 1986 Canadian College Draft from coast-to-coast.

The Winnipeg Blue Bombers and the Montreal Alouettes played the first CFL pre-season game at Canada Games Stadium in Saint John, New Brunswick. Winnipeg won the game, 35–10.

The CFL also amended the quota to the teams 35-man roster to include 13 imports, 19 non-imports and 3 quarterbacks. The designated import rule was eliminated.

On the field, the end zones were reduced to 20 yards from 25 yards (in response to the popularity of the shortened end zones first used at BC Place in 1983).

The amateur Canadian Football Association changed its name to Football Canada in June; the Football Canada name had long been used in French.

The CTV Television Network ceased CFL broadcasts after this season; it had aired CFL games since 1962. The league-run syndicated Canadian Football Network took its place the next season.

== Regular season standings ==
=== Final regular season standings ===
West Division
Pos	Team	Pld	W	L	T	PF	PA	PD	Pts
1	Edmonton Eskimos (Q)	18	13	4	1	540	365	+175	27
2	BC Lions (Q)	18	12	6	0	441	410	+31	24
3	Winnipeg Blue Bombers (Q)	18	11	7	0	545	387	+158	22
4	Calgary Stampeders (Q)	18	11	7	0	484	380	+104	22
5	Saskatchewan Roughriders	18	6	11	1	382	517	−135	13

Source: "1986 Regular Season Standings". Archived from the original on October 16, 2009.
(Q) Qualified for playoffs

East Division
Pos	Team	Pld	W	L	T	PF	PA	PD	Pts	Div	Stk
1	Toronto Argonauts (Q)	18	10	8	0	417	441	−24	20	7–1	W2
2	Hamilton Tiger-Cats (Q)	18	9	8	1	405	366	39	19	5–3	W3
3	Montreal Alouettes	18	4	14	0	320	500	−180	8	1–7	L3
4	Ottawa Rough Riders	18	3	14	1	346	514	−168	7	3–5	L1

Source: "1986 Regular Season Standings". Archived from the original on October 16, 2009.
(Q) Qualified for playoffs

== Grey Cup playoffs ==
The Hamilton Tiger-Cats are the 1986 Grey Cup champions, defeating the Edmonton Eskimos 39–15, at Vancouver's BC Place Stadium. This was Hamilton's first Grey Cup victory since 1972. The Tiger-Cats' Mike Kerrigan (QB) was named the Grey Cup's Most Valuable Player on Offence and Grover Covington (DE) was named Grey Cup's Most Valuable Player on Defence, while Paul Osbaldiston (K/P) was named the Grey Cup's Most Valuable Canadian.

=== Playoff bracket ===
November 16: Division Semifinals/East Game 1
East
E2	Hamilton Tiger-Cats	17
E1	Toronto Argonauts	31
W3	Winnipeg Blue Bombers	14
W2	BC Lions	21
West
W4	Calgary Stampeders	18
W1	Edmonton Eskimos	27

November 23: Division Finals/East Game 2
E1	Toronto Argonauts	25
E2	Hamilton Tiger-Cats	42
W2	BC Lions	5
W1	Edmonton Eskimos	41

November 30: 74th Grey Cup @ BC Place Stadium – Vancouver, BC
E2	Hamilton Tiger-Cats	39
W1	Edmonton Eskimos	15

- Hamilton won their 2 game total-point series against Toronto by outscoring them 59–56. The Tiger-Cats advanced to the Grey Cup Championship game.

== CFL leaders ==
- CFL passing leaders
- CFL rushing leaders
- CFL receiving leaders

== 1986 CFL All-Stars ==
=== Offence ===
- QB – Rick Johnson, Calgary Stampeders
- RB – Gary Allen, Calgary Stampeders
- RB – Bobby Johnson, Saskatchewan Roughriders
- SB – Joe Poplawski, Winnipeg Blue Bombers
- SB – Rocky DiPietro, Hamilton Tiger-Cats
- WR – James Murphy, Winnipeg Blue Bombers
- WR – James Hood, Montreal Alouettes
- C – Bob Poley, Calgary Stampeders
- OG – Roger Aldag, Saskatchewan Roughriders
- OG – Leo Blanchard, Edmonton Eskimos
- OT – Chris Walby, Winnipeg Blue Bombers
- OT – Rudy Phillips, Edmonton Eskimos

=== Defence ===
- DT – Harold Hallman, Calgary Stampeders
- DT – Brett Williams, Montreal Alouettes
- DE – James "Quick" Parker, BC Lions
- DE – Grover Covington, Hamilton Tiger-Cats
- LB – Danny Bass, Edmonton Eskimos
- LB – Tyrone Jones, Winnipeg Blue Bombers
- LB – Willie Pless, Toronto Argonauts
- CB – Roy Bennett, Winnipeg Blue Bombers
- CB – Less Browne, Hamilton Tiger-Cats
- DB – Larry Crawford, BC Lions
- DB – Mark Streeter, Hamilton Tiger-Cats
- S – Scott Flagel, Winnipeg Blue Bombers

=== Special teams ===
- P – Hank Ilesic, Toronto Argonauts
- K – Lance Chomyc, Toronto Argonauts
- ST – Gary Allen, Calgary Stampeders

== 1986 Eastern All-Stars ==
=== Offence ===
- QB – Mike Kerrigan, Hamilton Tiger-Cats
- RB – Walter Bender, Hamilton Tiger-Cats
- RB – Jim Reid, Ottawa Rough Riders
- SB – Mark Barousse, Ottawa Rough Riders
- SB – Rocky DiPietro, Hamilton Tiger-Cats
- WR – Tony Champion, Hamilton Tiger-Cats
- WR – James Hood, Montreal Alouettes
- C – Marv Allemang, Hamilton Tiger-Cats
- OG – Jason Riley, Hamilton Tiger-Cats
- OG – Dan Ferrone, Toronto Argonauts
- OT – Lloyd Fairbanks, Montreal Alouettes
- OT – Miles Gorrell, Hamilton Tiger-Cats

=== Defence ===
- DT – Mike Walker, Hamilton Tiger-Cats
- DT – Brett Williams, Montreal Alouettes
- DE – Rodney Harding, Toronto Argonauts
- DE – Grover Covington, Hamilton Tiger-Cats
- LB – Ben Zambiasi, Hamilton Tiger-Cats
- LB – Leo Ezerins, Hamilton Tiger-Cats
- LB – Willie Pless, Toronto Argonauts
- CB – Terry Irvin, Montreal Alouettes
- CB – Less Browne, Hamilton Tiger-Cats
- DB – Carl Brazley, Toronto Argonauts
- DB – Mark Streeter, Hamilton Tiger-Cats
- S – Rick Ryan, Montreal Alouettes

=== Special teams ===
- P – Hank Ilesic, Toronto Argonauts
- K – Lance Chomyc, Toronto Argonauts
- ST – Jeff Treftlin, Montreal Alouettes

== 1986 Western All-Stars ==
=== Offence ===
- QB – Rick Johnson, Calgary Stampeders
- RB – Gary Allen, Calgary Stampeders
- RB – Bobby Johnson, Saskatchewan Roughriders
- SB – Joe Poplawski, Winnipeg Blue Bombers
- SB – Emanuel Tolbert, Calgary Stampeders
- WR – James Murphy, Winnipeg Blue Bombers
- WR – Ray Alexander, Calgary Stampeders
- C – Bob Poley, Calgary Stampeders
- OG – Roger Aldag, Saskatchewan Roughriders
- OG – Leo Blanchard, Edmonton Eskimos
- OT – Chris Walby, Winnipeg Blue Bombers
- OT – Rudy Phillips, Edmonton Eskimos

=== Defence ===
- DT – Harold Hallman, Calgary Stampeders
- DT – James Zachery, Edmonton Eskimos
- DE – James "Quick" Parker, BC Lions
- DE – Stewart Hill, Edmonton Eskimos
- LB – Danny Bass, Edmonton Eskimos
- LB – Tyrone Jones, Winnipeg Blue Bombers
- LB – Billy Jackson, Saskatchewan Roughriders
- CB – Roy Bennett, Winnipeg Blue Bombers
- CB – Mel Jenkins, Calgary Stampeders
- DB – Larry Crawford, BC Lions
- DB – Richie Hall, Calgary Stampeders
- S – Scott Flagel, Winnipeg Blue Bombers

=== Special teams ===
- P – Tom Dixon, Edmonton Eskimos
- K – J. T. Hay, Calgary Stampeders
- ST – Gary Allen, Calgary Stampeders

== 1986 CFL awards ==
- CFL's Most Outstanding Player Award – James Murphy (WR), Winnipeg Blue Bombers
- CFL's Most Outstanding Canadian Award – Joe Poplawski (SB), Winnipeg Blue Bombers
- CFL's Most Outstanding Defensive Player Award – James "Quick" Parker (DE), BC Lions
- CFL's Most Outstanding Offensive Lineman Award – Roger Aldag (OG), Saskatchewan Roughriders
- CFL's Most Outstanding Rookie Award – Harold Hallman (DT), Calgary Stampeders
- CFLPA's Outstanding Community Service Award – Tyrone Crews (LB), BC Lions
- CFL's Coach of the Year – Al Bruno, Hamilton Tiger-Cats
