= 76th Grey Cup =

1988 Canadian Football championship game

Winnipeg Blue Bombers	BC Lions
(9–9)	(10–8)
22	21
Head coach: Mike Riley	Head coach: Larry Donovan
	1	2	3	4	Total
Winnipeg Blue Bombers	4	10	5	3	22
BC Lions	7	8	4	2	21
- Date: November 27, 1988
- Stadium: Frank Clair Stadium
- Location: Ottawa
- Most Valuable Player: Offence: James Murphy, WR (Blue Bombers); Defence: Michael Gray, DT (Blue Bombers)
- Most Valuable Canadian: Bob Cameron, P (Blue Bombers)
- Referee: Jake Ireland
- Attendance: 50,604

Broadcasters
- Network: CBC, Canadian Football Network, SRC
- Announcers: CBC: Don Wittman, Ron Lancaster, Brian Williams, Steve Armitage, Scott Oake. CFN: Bob Irving, Neil Lumsden, Dave Hodge, Tom Larscheid. SRC: N/A.

The 76th Grey Cup was the 1988 Canadian Football League championship game that was played at Lansdowne Park in Ottawa, between the BC Lions and the Winnipeg Blue Bombers. The Blue Bombers defeated the favoured Lions 22–21. This was the first Grey Cup game between two teams from west of Ontario, and the first to be won by a team which had only a .500 season.

== Game summary ==
Winnipeg Blue Bombers (22) - TDs, James Murphy; FGs, Trevor Kennerd (4); cons., Kennerd; singles, Trevor Kennerd, Bob Cameron (2).

BC Lions (21) - TDs, Anthony Cherry, David Williams; FGs, Lui Passaglia; cons., Passaglia (2); singles, Passaglia (2); safety touch.

The Lions jumped to a 7-1 lead in the opening quarter as running back Anthony Cherry scored on a 14-yard run. Kennerd kicked a 22-yard field goal to pull the Bombers within three.

With the wind at his back in the second quarter, Kennerd tied the score with a 43-yard field goal. But Lions quarterback Matt Dunigan connected with David Williams on a 26-yard scoring play, giving BC a 14-7 advantage.

The Bombers got that one back on their next possession. Quarterback Sean Salisbury threw a 35-yard touchdown strike to James Murphy to pull Winnipeg even. BC's Lui Passaglia failed on a 41-yard field goal attempt near the end of the half, but it did give the Lions a 15-14 lead at intermission.

Passaglia and Kennerd exchanged field goals in the third quarter. The game was deadlocked at 19 heading into the final 15 minutes.

With 2:55 remaining, Trevor Kennerd kicked a 30-yard field goal to put the Bombers in front for the first time in the game. With the score 22-19 in favour of the Bombers, the Lions marched 75 yards downfield to the Winnipeg seven-yard line. Dunigan's pass was batted down and intercepted in the end zone by Winnipeg's Mike Gray to snuff out the drive.

The BC defence held and Winnipeg head coach Mike Riley elected to give up a safety in favour of better field position, cutting the margin to just one. The ensuing kickoff was returned by BC's Anthony Drawhorn 38 yards to the BC 45-yard line, but the ball was brought back to the 30 when Cherry was flagged for an unnecessary roughness penalty. The Lions then went three and out and turned the ball over on downs and the Bombers ran out the clock for the win.

== Trivia ==
The 50,604 in attendance was the largest crowd to witness a football game in Ottawa until the 2004 Grey Cup.

== 1988 CFL Playoffs ==
=== West Division ===
- Semi-final (November 13 @ Regina, Saskatchewan) BC Lions 42-18 Saskatchewan Roughriders
- Final (November 20 @ Edmonton, Alberta) BC Lions 37-19 Edmonton Eskimos

=== East Division ===
- Semi-final (November 13 @ Winnipeg, Manitoba) Winnipeg Blue Bombers 35-28 Hamilton Tiger-Cats
- Final (November 20 @ Toronto, Ontario) Winnipeg Blue Bombers 27-11 Toronto Argonauts
