= 1987 BC Lions season =

Canadian football team season

- General manager: Joe Galat
- Head coach: Don Matthews; Larry Donovan (Interim)
- Home stadium: BC Place Stadium

Results
- Record: 12–6
- Division place: 1st, West
- Playoffs: Lost West Final

Uniform

The 1987 BC Lions finished in first place in the West Division with a 12–6 record. They appeared in the West Final.

== Offseason ==
=== CFL draft ===
Round	Pick	Player	Position	School

== Preseason ==
Game	Date	Opponent	Results		Venue	Attendance
Game	Date	Opponent	Score	Record	Venue	Attendance
A	Thu, June 11	at Winnipeg Blue Bombers	L 14–35	0–1	Winnipeg Stadium	19,730
B	Tue, June 16	vs. Edmonton Eskimos	W 31–15	1–1	BC Place	28,384

== Regular season ==
=== Season standings ===
West Division
Pos	Team	Pld	W	L	T	PF	PA	PD	Pts	Div	Stk
1	BC Lions (C, Q)	18	12	6	0	502	370	132	24	6–3	W4
2	Edmonton Eskimos (Q)	18	11	7	0	617	462	155	22	5–4	W1
3	Calgary Stampeders (Q)	18	10	8	0	453	517	−64	20	5–3	L2
4	Saskatchewan Roughriders	18	5	12	1	364	529	−165	11	2–7	L3

Source: "CFL.ca". Archived from the original on 2009-10-16.
(C) First round bye; (Q) Qualified for playoffs

=== Season schedule ===
Week	Game	Date	Opponent	Results		Venue	Attendance
Week	Game	Date	Opponent	Score	Record	Venue	Attendance
1	1	Sun, June 28	vs. Saskatchewan Roughriders	W 44–1	1–0	BC Place	30,157
2	2	Wed, July 1	at Calgary Stampeders	W 40–15	2–0	McMahon Stadium	22,239
3	Bye						
4	3	Sat, July 18	vs. Edmonton Eskimos	W 26–18	3–0	BC Place	43,772
5	4	Sat, July 25	vs. Ottawa Rough Riders	W 21–1	4–0	BC Place	33,771
6	5	Fri, July 31	at Hamilton Tiger-Cats	L 20–21	4–1	Ivor Wynne Stadium	18,088
7	6	Sat, Aug 8	at Winnipeg Blue Bombers	L 22–30	4–2	Winnipeg Stadium	29,296
8	7	Thu, Aug 13	vs. Toronto Argonauts	W 30–23	5–2	BC Place	37,843
9	8	Thu, Aug 20	at Calgary Stampeders	L 26–31	5–3	McMahon Stadium	24,377
10	9	Sun, Aug 30	vs. Winnipeg Blue Bombers	W 24–23	6–3	BC Place	38,338
11	Bye						
12	10	Fri, Sept 11	at Ottawa Rough Riders	W 55–16	7–3	Lansdowne Park	19,201
13	11	Sun, Sept 20	vs. Winnipeg Blue Bombers	W 30–20	8–3	BC Place	39,859
14	12	Sun, Sept 27	at Saskatchewan Roughriders	L 20–35	8–4	Taylor Field	24,682
15	13	Sun, Oct 4	at Toronto Argonauts	L 14–33	8–5	Exhibition Stadium	26,232
16	14	Sun, Oct 11	vs. Calgary Stampeders	L 6–34	8–6	BC Place	31,244
17	15	Sat, Oct 17	vs. Hamilton Tiger-Cats	W 25–11	9–6	BC Place	34,909
18	16	Sun, Oct 25	at Calgary Stampeders	W 32–12	10–6	McMahon Stadium	25,233
19	17	Sun, Nov 1	at Edmonton Eskimos	W 33–32	11–6	Commonwealth Stadium	40,414
20	18	Sun, Nov 8	vs. Saskatchewan Roughriders	W 34–14	12–6	BC Place	38,370

== Awards and records ==
- CFL's Most Outstanding Defensive Player Award – Greg Stumon (DE)

=== 1987 CFL All-Stars ===
- WR – Jim Sandusky, CFL All-Star
- DE – Greg Stumon, CFL All-Star
- LB – Kevin Konar, CFL All-Star
- DB – Larry Crawford, CFL All-Star

== Playoffs ==
=== West Final ===
Team	Q1	Q2	Q3	Q4	Total
Edmonton Eskimos	14	7	3	7	31
BC Lions	3	4	0	0	7

== Roster ==
1987 BC Lions final roster
Quarterbacks: 9 Roy Dewalt; 11 Condredge Holloway; Running backs: 25 Ray Crouse; 35 Kevin Dixon; 19 Anthony Parker; 2 Freddie Sims; 23 Jamie Taras; Receivers: 6 Byron Willimas; 27 Jan Carinci; 26 Joe Germain; 82 Jon Horton; 34 Scott Lecky; 36 Paul Nastasiuk; 21 John Pankratz; 3 Jim Sandusky	Offensive linemen: 68 John Blain T; 69 Jamie Buis G/T; 64 Tim Burnham G/T; 62 John Coflin C/G; 61 Dan Hurley G/T; 66 Jim Mills T; 65 Gerald Roper G; 55 Ian Sinclair C; 50 Pieter Vanden Bos G; Defensive linemen: 78 Walter Ballard DE; 70 Dwayne Derban DT; 90 Rick Klassen DT; 45 Gregg Stumon DE; 71 Brett Williams DT/DE; Special teams: 5 Lui Passaglia K/P	Linebackers: 7 Bernie Glier; 37 Glen Jackson; 31 Kevin Konar; 16 Rob Moretto; 76 John Ulmer; Defensive backs: 10 Melvin Byrd; 28 Larry Crawford; 14 Andre Francis; 18 Keith Gooch; 33 Darryl Hemphill; 4 Nelson Martin; 38 Marcus Thomas; 32 Todd Wiseman; Injured list: 91 Tyrone Crews LB; 40 James Parker DE; Italics indicate International player
