= 1987 Winnipeg Blue Bombers season =

Canadian football team season

- General manager: Cal Murphy
- Head coach: Mike Riley
- Home stadium: Winnipeg Stadium

Results
- Record: 12–6
- Division place: 1st, East
- Playoffs: Lost East Final

The 1987 Winnipeg Blue Bombers finished in first place in the East Division with a 12–6 record. They hosted the East Final, but lost to the Toronto Argonauts. This was the Blue Bombers first season in the East Division, having been moved from the West Division to replace the Montreal Alouettes, who folded just prior to the regular season.

== Offseason ==
=== CFL draft ===
Rd	Pick	Player	Position	School

== Preseason ==
Game	Date	Opponent	Results		Venue	Attendance
Game	Date	Opponent	Score	Record	Venue	Attendance
A	Sat, June 6	at Saskatchewan Roughriders	L 14–27	0–1	Taylor Field	17,381
B	Thu, June 11	vs. BC Lions	W 35–14	1–1	Winnipeg Stadium	19,730

== Regular season ==
=== Standings ===
East Division
Pos	Team	Pld	W	L	T	PF	PA	PD	Pts	Div	Stk
1	Winnipeg Blue Bombers (C, Q)	18	12	6	0	554	409	145	24	5–2	L1
2	Toronto Argonauts (Q)	18	11	6	1	484	427	57	23	6–4	W1
3	Hamilton Tiger-Cats (Q)	18	7	11	0	470	509	−39	14	4–5	L2
4	Ottawa Rough Riders	18	3	15	0	377	598	−221	6	2–6	L1

Source: "1987 Regular Season Standings". Archived from the original on 2009-10-16.
(C) First round bye; (Q) Qualified for playoffs

=== Schedule ===
Game	Date	Opponent	Results		Venue	Attendance
Game	Date	Opponent	Score	Record	Venue	Attendance
1	Fri, June 25	at Toronto Argonauts	W 38–30	1–0	Exhibition Stadium	33,412
2	Fri, July 3	vs. Ottawa Rough Riders	W 51–24	2–0	Winnipeg Stadium	23,121
3	Fri, July 10	vs. Calgary Stampeders	W 38–22	3–0	Winnipeg Stadium	22,808
4	Thu, July 16	at Calgary Stampeders	W 21–14	4–0	McMahon Stadium	20,553
5	Fri, July 24	vs. Edmonton Eskimos	L 28–42	4–1	Winnipeg Stadium	29,260
6	Bye					
7	Sat, Aug 8	vs. BC Lions	W 30–22	5–1	Winnipeg Stadium	29,296
8	Fri, Aug 14	at Hamilton Tiger-Cats	L 14–26	5–2	Ivor Wynne Stadium	18,503
9	Sat, Aug 22	vs. Saskatchewan Roughriders	W 35–6	6–2	Winnipeg Stadium	28,591
10	Sun, Aug 30	at BC Lions	L 23–24	6–3	BC Place	38,338
11	Sun, Sept 6	at Saskatchewan Roughriders	W 29–25	7–3	Taylor Field	27,457
12	Sun, Sept 13	vs. Calgary Stampeders	W 40–5	8–3	Winnipeg Stadium	25,549
13	Sun, Sept 20	at BC Lions	L 20–30	8–4	BC Place	39,859
14	Sat, Sept 26	at Ottawa Rough Riders	W 36–13	9–4	Lansdowne Park	17,101
15	Sun, Oct 4	vs. Hamilton Tiger-Cats	W 47–14	10–4	Winnipeg Stadium	31,655
16	Mon, Oct 12	vs. Edmonton Eskimos	W 38–20	11–4	Winnipeg Stadium	24,999
17	Bye					
18	Sun, Oct 25	at Edmonton Eskimos	L 24–39	11–5	Commonwealth Stadium	33,376
19	Sun, Nov 1	vs. Toronto Argonauts	W 24–23	12–5	Winnipeg Stadium	26,288
20	Sun, Nov 8	at Toronto Argonauts	L 18–20	12–6	Exhibition Stadium	21,042

== Playoffs ==
=== East Final ===
Team	Q1	Q2	Q3	Q4	Total
Toronto Argonauts	0	8	1	10	19
Winnipeg Blue Bombers	0	3	0	0	3

== Roster ==
1987 Winnipeg Blue Bombers final roster
Quarterbacks: 2 Tom Clements; 7 Tom Muecke; Running backs: 25 Lester Brown; 33 Pat Cantner; 74 Vernon Pahl; 38 Willard Reaves; Receivers: 79 Nick Arakgi; 70 Jeff Boyd; 73 Randy Fabi; 5 Sheldon Gaines; 21 James Murphy; 22 Perry Tuttle; 26 Ken Winey; 39 Darren Yewchyn	Offensive linemen: 65 Nick Bastaja G; 59 Lyle Bauer C; 51 David Black T; 64 Eddie McQuarters G; 60 Bob Molle G; 66 Steve Rodehutskors T; 63 Chris Walby T; Defensive linemen: 52 Mike Gray DE; 75 Stan Mikawos DT; 52 Rob Prodanovic DT; 57 Mark Seale DE; Special teams: 6 Bob Cameron P; 3 Trevor Kennerd K	Linebackers: 34 Greg Battle; 72 Delbert Fowler; 35 Tyrone Jones; 76 Darrell Patterson; 55 Rob Pavan; 58 James West; Defensive backs: 23 Roy Bennett; 14 Scott Flagel; 24 Ken Hailey; 20 James Jefferson; 9 Ken Pettway; 30 Darryl Sampson; 37 Bennie Thompson; Italics indicate American player
