= 1987 Edmonton Eskimos season =

Canadian football team season

- General manager: Hugh Campbell
- Head coach: Jackie Parker, Joe Faragalli
- Home stadium: Commonwealth Stadium

Results
- Record: 11–7
- Division place: 2nd, West
- Playoffs: Won Grey Cup

Uniform

The 1987 Edmonton Eskimos finished in second place in the West Division with an 11–7 record and defeated the Toronto Argonauts to win the 75th Grey Cup.

== Pre-season ==
=== Schedule ===
Week	Date	Opponent	Result	Record	Venue	Attendance
A	June 6	vs. Calgary Stampeders	W 39–33	1–0		34,501
C	June 16	at BC Lions	L 15–31	1–1		28,384

== Regular season ==
=== Season standings ===
West Division
Pos	Team	Pld	W	L	T	PF	PA	PD	Pts	Div	Stk
1	BC Lions (C, Q)	18	12	6	0	502	370	132	24	6–3	W4
2	Edmonton Eskimos (Q)	18	11	7	0	617	462	155	22	5–4	W1
3	Calgary Stampeders (Q)	18	10	8	0	453	517	−64	20	5–3	L2
4	Saskatchewan Roughriders	18	5	12	1	364	529	−165	11	2–7	L3

Source: "CFL.ca". Archived from the original on 2009-10-16.
(C) First round bye; (Q) Qualified for playoffs

=== Season schedule ===
Week	Game	Date	Opponent	Result	Record	Venue	Attendance
1	1	June 27	vs. Calgary Stampeders	W 54–16	1–0		29,930
2	2	July 5	at Hamilton Tiger-Cats	W 36–33	2–0		15,720
3	3	July 12	vs. Hamilton Tiger-Cats	L 30–40	2–1		32,265
4	4	July 18	at BC Lions	L 18–26	2–2		43,772
5	5	July 24	at Winnipeg Blue Bombers	W 42–28	3–2		29,260
6	6	Aug 1	vs. Saskatchewan Roughriders	W 38–28	4–2		30,399
7	7	Aug 7	at Toronto Argonauts	L 20–23	4–3		30,264
8	Bye						
9	8	Aug 23	vs. Ottawa Rough Riders	W 45–24	5–3		32,167
10	9	Aug 28	at Saskatchewan Roughriders	W 39–13	6–3		24,000
11	10	Sept 7	at Calgary Stampeders	L 20–29	6–4		33,842
12	11	Sept 12	vs. Toronto Argonauts	W 42–20	7–4		40,486
13	12	Sept 19	vs. Saskatchewan Roughriders	W 34–13	8–4		31,862
14	Bye						
15	13	Oct 2	vs. Ottawa Rough Riders	W 34–19	9–4		31,331
16	14	Oct 12	at Winnipeg Blue Bombers	L 20–38	9–5		24,999
17	15	Oct 18	at Saskatchewan Roughriders	L 25–34	9–6		24,282
18	16	Oct 25	vs. Winnipeg Blue Bombers	W 39–24	10–6		33,376
19	17	Nov 1	vs. BC Lions	L 32–33	10–7		40,414
20	18	Nov 7	at Ottawa Rough Riders	W 39–21	11–7		15,107

Total attendance: 302,230
Average attendance: 33,581 (55.9%)

== Playoffs ==
Round	Date	Opponent	Result	Record	Venue	Attendance
Division Semi-Final	Nov 15	vs. Calgary Stampeders	W 30–16	1–0	Commonwealth Stadium	26,809
Division Final	Nov 22	at BC Lions	W 31–7	2–0	BC Place	44,385
Grey Cup	Nov 29	vs. Toronto Argonauts	W 38–36	3–0	BC Place	59,478

=== Grey Cup ===
Teams	1 Q	2 Q	3 Q	4 Q	Final
Toronto Argonauts	3	21	3	9	36
Edmonton Eskimos	10	7	4	17	38

=== Awards and honours ===
- Dick Suderman Trophy – Milson Jones
- Grey Cup Most Valuable Player (Offence) – Damon Allen
- Grey Cup Most Valuable Player (Defence) – Stewart Hill
- Jeff Nicklin Memorial Trophy – Brian Kelly

== Roster ==
1987 Edmonton Eskimos final roster
Quarterbacks: 9 Damon Allen; 16 Matt Dunigan; 8 Tracy Ham; Running backs: 83 Chris Johnstone; 34 Milson Jones; 22 Blake Marshall; 35 Chris Skinner; Receivers: 27 Marco Cyncar; 31 Rick House; 78 Stephen Jones; 70 Brian Kelly; 25 Tom Richards; 2 Gizmo Williams	Offensive linemen: 59 Leo Blanchard G; 66 Trevor Bowles T; 67 Rod Connop C; 50 Blake Dermott C/G; 68 Rudy Phillips G/T; 63 Hector Pothier G; 62 Bill Stevenson T; Defensive linemen: 36 Stewart Hill DE; 95 Dan Kearns DE; 75 John Mandarich DT; 98 Gary Palumbis DT; 92 James Zachery DE/DT; Special teams: 4 Jerry Kauric K/P	Linebackers: 49 Frank Balkovec; 30 Danny Bass; 45 Mike McLean; 43 Craig Shaffer; 44 Brian Warren; 47 Larry Wruck; Defensive backs: 24 Steve Benjamin; 5 Stanley Blair; 28 Ron Howard; 84 Mark Norman; 11 Junior Robinson; 29 Mike Thurman; 6 Cliff Toney; 20 Don Wilson	Injured list: 15 Laurent DesLauriers WR; Italics indicate American player
