= Bill Quinter =

American and Canadian football player and coach

No. 74
- Positions: Defensive end, Tight end, Linebacker

Personal information
- Born: September 2, 1939; Takoma Park, Maryland, U.S.
- Died: April 12, 2014 (aged 75); West Kelowna, British Columbia, Canada
- Listed height: 6 ft 2 in (1.88 m)
- Listed weight: 238 lb (108 kg)

Career information
- College: Indiana

Career history

Playing
- 1962: Washington Redskins*
- 1963–1966: Ottawa Rough Riders
- 1967: Dallas Cowboys*
- 1967: Atlanta Falcons*
- * Offseason or practice squad member only

Coaching
- 1968: Indiana State (OL coach)
- 1969–1970: Pittsburgh (Freshmen coach)
- 1971–1972: Pittsburgh (WR Coach)
- 1973–1974: Toronto Argonauts (Asst)
- 1976: Calgary Stampeders (Asst)
- 1977–1982: BC Lions (DL Coach)

Operations
- 1983–1984: BC Lions (Dir. of Player Development)
- 1985–1986: Saskatchewan Roughriders (GM)
- 1988–1989: Winnipeg Blue Bombers (Dir. of Player Personnel)
- 1990–1995: BC Lions (Dir. of Player Personnel)
- 1996–1997: Seattle Seahawks (Scout)
- 1998–1999: Seattle Seahawks (Dir. of Pro Scouting)
- 2000–2008: New Orleans Saints (Pro scout)

Bill Quinter was an American and Canadian football player, coach, and executive who served as Saskatchewan Roughriders.

== Early life ==
Quinter was born on September 2, 1939, in Takoma Park, Maryland. A tight end and linebacker, he played high school football in Wheaton, Maryland, and college football for the Indiana Hoosiers. He signed with the Washington Redskins in 1962, but was cut after the preseason. He then signed with the Ottawa Rough Riders, where he spent four seasons as a defensive lineman. In 1967 he signed with the Dallas Cowboys, but was cut before the season began. He spent some time that season on the Atlanta Falcons taxi squad.

== Coaching ==
Quinter began his coaching career in 1968 as the offensive line coach at Indiana State. In 1969, he joined Pittsburgh as freshman football coach. In 1971 he was moved to receivers coach. In 1973 he became an assistant with the Toronto Argonauts. In 1976 he was a defensive assistant for the Calgary Stampeders. In 1977 he joined the BC Lions as defensive line coach.

== Football executive ==
After the 1982 season, Lions head coach Vic Rapp was fired and Quinter was reassigned to the front office as director of player development. He helped recruit Kevin Konar, Rick Klassen, Nick Hebeler, and John Pankratz to the team and was involved in the creation of the CFL's scouting combine and yearly player development camp for Canadian college players.

On December 5, 1984, he was named general manager of the Saskatchewan Roughriders. During his tenure with Saskatchewan, the team had an 11-22-2 record and did not make the playoffs. He and head coach Jack Gotta were fired on December 8, 1986, even though they each had a year remaining on their contracts. According to team president Tom Shepherd, their dismissals were necessary to end internal feuding between the two. During his time in Saskatchewan, Quinter signed a number of players who would help the team win the 1989 Grey Cup, including Bobby Jurasin, Gary Lewis, Dave Albright, Tim McCray, Ken Moore, and Harry Skipper.

In 1987, Quinter joined the Winnipeg Blue Bombers as director of player personnel. He was with the Bombers when they won the 76th Grey Cup. In 1990 he returned to the BC Lions as director of player personnel. The Lions won the 1994 Grey Cup, however Quinter was fired the following May due to conflict with general manager Eric Tillman. He joined the Seattle Seahawks as a scout in 1996 and was promoted to director of pro scouting in 1998. He was fired in May 1999. From 2000 to 2008, Quinter was a pro scout with the New Orleans Saints.

Quinter died on April 12, 2014, at his home in West Kelowna.
