= 1987 Calgary Stampeders season =

Canadian football team season

- General manager: Earl Lunsford
- Head coach: Bob Vespaziani; Larry Kuharich
- Home stadium: McMahon Stadium

Results
- Record: 10–8
- Division place: 3rd, West
- Playoffs: Lost West Semi-Final

The 1987 Calgary Stampeders finished in third place in the West Division with a 10–8 record. The Stampeders were defeated in the West Semi-Final by the Edmonton Eskimos 30–16.

== Roster ==
1987 Calgary Stampeders final roster
Quarterbacks: 11 Carl Fodor; 16 Rick Johnson; 17 Rick Worman; Running backs: 23 Gary Allen; 33 Mass Geremia; 28 Andy McVey; 12 Tim Petros; 25 Kirby Warren; Receivers: 71 Jay Christensen; 35 Tony Pierson; 19 Emanuel Tolbert; 76 Marshall Toner; 89 Larry Willis	Offensive linemen: 51 Donavan Fann T; 65 Mike Palumbo G/C; 57 Bob Poley C; 59 Rocco Romano G/T; 54 Rob Smith G; 50 Lee Spivey T; 61 Tom Spoletini G; 68 Kari Yli-Renko T; Defensive linemen: 84 Gene Belliveau DE; 78 Vince Goldsmith DE; 99 Harold Hallman DT; 75 Stu Laird DT; 93 Kent Warnock DT; 91 Quency Williams DE	Linebackers: 85 Mike Emery; 37 Matt Finlay; 38 Bruce Green; 95 Lemont Jeffers; 72 Bernie Morrison; Defensive backs: 39 Bruno Geremia; 27 Richie Hall; 14 Larry Hogue; 15 Ron Hopkins; 32 Darcy Kopp; 20 Chris Major; 3 David McCrary; 24 Greg Peterson; Special teams: 6 Glenn Harper P; 2 J. T. Hay K; Italics indicate International player

== Preseason ==
Date	Opponent	Score	Result

== Regular season ==
=== Season standings ===
West Division
Pos	Team	Pld	W	L	T	PF	PA	PD	Pts	Div	Stk
1	BC Lions (C, Q)	18	12	6	0	502	370	132	24	6–3	W4
2	Edmonton Eskimos (Q)	18	11	7	0	617	462	155	22	5–4	W1
3	Calgary Stampeders (Q)	18	10	8	0	453	517	−64	20	5–3	L2
4	Saskatchewan Roughriders	18	5	12	1	364	529	−165	11	2–7	L3

Source: "CFL.ca". Archived from the original on 2009-10-16.
(C) First round bye; (Q) Qualified for playoffs

=== Season schedule ===
Week	Game	Date	Opponent	Results		Venue	Attendance
Week	Game	Date	Opponent	Score	Record	Venue	Attendance
	1		Saskatchewan Roughriders	W 29–28	1–0		
	2		Edmonton Eskimos	L 16–54	1–1		
	3	July 1	BC Lions	L 15–40	1–2		
	4		Winnipeg Blue Bombers	L 22–38	1–3		
	5		Winnipeg Blue Bombers	L 14–21	1–4		
	6		Toronto Argonauts	L 16–26	1–5		
	7		Toronto Argonauts	L 13–32	1–6		
	8		Ottawa Rough Riders	W 39–38	2–6		
	9		BC Lions	W 31–26	3–6		
	10	September 7	Edmonton Eskimos	W 29–20	4–6	McMahon Stadium	
	11		Winnipeg Blue Bombers	L 5–40	4–7		
	12		Ottawa Rough Riders	W 41–19	5–7		
	13		Hamilton Tiger-Cats	W 33–17	6–7		
	14		Saskatchewan Roughriders	W 28–11	7–7		
	15		BC Lions	W 34–6	8–7		
	16		BC Lions	L 12–32	8–8		
	17		Hamilton Tiger-Cats	W 34–33	9–8		
	18		Hamilton Tiger-Cats	W 42–36	10–8		

== Playoffs ==
=== West Semi-Final ===
Team	Q1	Q2	Q3	Q4	Total
Calgary Stampeders	?	?	?	?	16
Edmonton Eskimos	?	?	?	?	30
