= 1987 Saskatchewan Roughriders season =

Season of the Canadian Football League

- General manager: Bill Baker
- Head coach: John Gregory
- Home stadium: Taylor Field

Results
- Record: 5–12–1
- Division place: 4th, West

The 1987 Saskatchewan Roughriders season was the club's 78th year of operation, 73rd season of play, and its 30th season in the Canadian Football League.

== Roster ==
1987 Saskatchewan Roughriders final roster
Quarterbacks: 5 Kent Austin; 1 Jeff Bentrim; 16 Tom Burgess; Running backs: 33 Walt Bender; 31 Terry Cochrane; 37 David Conrad; 30 Denny Ferdinand; 14 Tim McCray; Receivers: 87 Tron Armstrong; 82 Albert Brown; 84 Todd Brown; 88 Tony Dennis; 81 Ray Elgaard; 85 James Ellingson; 86 Ray McDonald; 80 Don Narcisse	Offensive linemen: 44 Roger Aldag G; 66 Mike Anderson C; 61 Bryan Illerbrun G; 64 Ken Moore T; 68 Lawrie Skolrood T; 62 Vic Stevenson T; 54 Mark Urness G/C; Defensive linemen: 78 James Curry DT; 77 Al Johns DT; 71 Bobby Jurasin DE; 79 Gary Lewis DT; 76 Lynn Madsen DE; Special teams: 10 Terry Baker P; 36 Dave Ridgway K	Linebackers: 39 Dave Albright; 38 Steve Crane; 45 Billy Jackson; 42 Eddie Lowe; 74 Dan Rashovich; Defensive backs: 25 Rod Fisher; 24 Joe Fuller; 28 Mike McGruder; 22 Dave Sidoo; 26 Harry Skipper; 27 Glen Suitor; Injured list: 12 John Hufnagel QB; Italics indicate American player

== Standings ==
West Division
Pos	Team	Pld	W	L	T	PF	PA	PD	Pts	Div	Stk
1	BC Lions (C, Q)	18	12	6	0	502	370	132	24	6–3	W4
2	Edmonton Eskimos (Q)	18	11	7	0	617	462	155	22	5–4	W1
3	Calgary Stampeders (Q)	18	10	8	0	453	517	−64	20	5–3	L2
4	Saskatchewan Roughriders	18	5	12	1	364	529	−165	11	2–7	L3

Source: "CFL.ca". Archived from the original on 2009-10-16.
(C) First round bye; (Q) Qualified for playoffs

== Awards and honours ==
=== CFL All-Stars ===
- OG – Roger Aldag
- DE – Bobby Jurasin
- K – Dave Ridgway

=== Western All-Stars ===
- RB – Walter Bender
- SB – Ray Elgaard
- OG – Roger Aldag
- DT – James Curry
- DE – Bobby Jurasin
- CB – Harry Skipper
- K – Dave Ridgway
