= 1987 Montreal Alouettes season =

Sports season

- Owner: Charles Bronfman
- Head coach: Joe Faragalli
- Home stadium: Olympic Stadium (scheduled)

Results
- Record: 0–2 (exhibition)
- Division place: Folded
- Playoffs: ceased operations

Uniform

The 1987 Montreal Alouettes played two preseason games before folding on June 24, 1987, just one day before their scheduled regular-season opener against the Toronto Argonauts.

The once-proud franchise had suffered both on and off the field since Sam Berger sold the Alouettes in 1981. Even a rebranding as the Concordes from 1982 to 1985 did not reversed the team's fortunes. In the previous six years, the team had only played .500 ball once (in 1985) and made the playoffs twice (winning the Eastern Semi-Final in 1985). From 1982 to 1986, the Concordes/Alouettes attracted a crowd of better than 30,000 only once, and for much of 1986, the club played in a near-empty Olympic Stadium, attracting an average of just 11,121 per contest (including only 9,045 in what would be the original Als last-ever game, a 37–16 loss to Toronto on November 9).

Owner Charles Bronfman had lost $15 million since rescuing the team in 1982, and was unwilling to stomach further losses without increased season ticket sales. When the increased sales didn't materialize, Bronfman put the team on the market. However, there were no credible buyers in the Montreal area, and no prospective candidates in other cities had a stadium that was adequate even for temporary use. Ultimately, Bronfman and the CFL euthanized the team just a day before the start of the season.

The team never played a single game at Olympic Stadium in 1987; both of their preseason games prior to their folding were played on the road (their first preseason game was moved from Olympic Stadium to Canada Games Stadium in Saint John, New Brunswick).

The CFL had been well aware of the Alouettes' troubles, and already had a contingency plan already in place. The Winnipeg Blue Bombers moved to the East Division to balance out the divisions and played the Argonauts that day instead.

== Preseason ==
Game	Date	Opponent	Results		Venue	Attendance
Game	Date	Opponent	Score	Record	Venue	Attendance
A	Sat, June 6	Hamilton Tiger-Cats	L 13–14	0–1	Canada Games Stadium (Saint John, New Brunswick)	4,000
B	Mon, June 15	Ottawa Rough Riders	L 15–18	0–2	Lansdowne Park	16,320

== Regular season ==
=== Standings ===
East Division
Team	GP	W	L	T	PF	PA	Pts
Winnipeg Blue Bombers	18	12	6	0	554	409	24
Toronto Argonauts	18	11	6	1	484	427	23
Hamilton Tiger-Cats	18	7	11	0	470	509	14
Ottawa Rough Riders	18	3	15	0	377	598	6

=== Schedule ===
- Regular season was cancelled.
