= 1987 Toronto Argonauts season =

CFL team season

- Head coach: Bob O'Billovich
- Home stadium: Exhibition Stadium

Results
- Record: 11–6–1
- Division place: 2nd, East
- Playoffs: Lost Grey Cup

Uniform

The 1987 Toronto Argonauts finished in second place in the East Division with an 11–6–1 record. They appeared in the Grey Cup game but lost to the Edmonton Eskimos 38–36. As of 2024, this was the most recent season where the Argonauts lost in the Grey Cup, winning the next 8 Grey Cups they appeared in.

== Offseason ==
The Toronto Argonauts drafted the following players in the 1987 CFL draft.

| Round | Pick | Player | Position | School |
|---|---|---|---|---|
| 3 | 21 | Jake Vaughan | DB | Bishop's |
| 4 | 31 | Scott Lesperance | OL | Colgate |
| 5 | 40 | Veron Stiliadis | DL/LB | Wilfrid Laurier |
| 6 | 49 | Ron Klein | DB | Wilfrid Laurier |
| 7 | 58 | Rob Raycroft | OL | Toronto |
| 8 | 67 | Dave Kohler | LB | Wifrid Laurier |

== Regular season ==
=== Standings ===
East Division
| Pos | Team | Pld | W | L | T | PF | PA | PD | Pts | Div | Stk |
|---|---|---|---|---|---|---|---|---|---|---|---|
| 1 | Winnipeg Blue Bombers (C, Q) | 18 | 12 | 6 | 0 | 554 | 409 | 145 | 24 | 5–2 | L1 |
| 2 | Toronto Argonauts (Q) | 18 | 11 | 6 | 1 | 484 | 427 | 57 | 23 | 6–4 | W1 |
| 3 | Hamilton Tiger-Cats (Q) | 18 | 7 | 11 | 0 | 470 | 509 | −39 | 14 | 4–5 | L2 |
| 4 | Ottawa Rough Riders | 18 | 3 | 15 | 0 | 377 | 598 | −221 | 6 | 2–6 | L1 |

Source: "1987 Regular Season Standings". Archived from the original on 2009-10-16.
(C) First round bye; (Q) Qualified for playoffs

=== Schedule ===
| Game | Game | Date | Opponent | Results | | Venue | Attendance |
| Game | Game | Date | Opponent | Score | Record | Venue | Attendance |
|---|---|---|---|---|---|---|---|
| 1 | Bye | | | | | | |
| 2 | 1 | June 25 | vs. Winnipeg Blue Bombers | L 30–38 | 0–1 | Exhibition Stadium | 33,412 |
| 3 | 2 | July 4 | at Saskatchewan Roughriders | T 33–33 (OT) | 0–1–1 | Taylor Field | 23,927 |
| 4 | 3 | July 11 | at Ottawa Rough Riders | L 27–34 | 0–2–1 | Landsdowne Park | 19,699 |
| 5 | 4 | July 17 | at Hamilton Tiger-Cats | W 30–27 | 1–2–1 | Ivor Wynne Stadium | 18,214 |
| 6 | 5 | July 22 | vs. Calgary Stampeders | W 26–16 | 2–2–1 | Exhibition Stadium | 31,524 |
| 7 | 6 | Aug 2 | at Calgary Stampeders | W 32–13 | 3–2–1 | McMahon Stadium | 21,125 |
| 8 | 7 | Aug 7 | vs. Edmonton Eskimos | W 23–20 | 4–2–1 | Exhibition Stadium | 30,264 |
| 9 | 8 | Aug 13 | at BC Lions | L 23–30 | 4–3–1 | BC Place | 37,843 |
| 10 | 9 | Aug 21 | vs. Hamilton Tiger-Cats | L 25–28 | 4–4–1 | Exhibition Stadium | 33,648 |
| 11 | Bye | | | | | | |
| 12 | 10 | Sept 7 | at Hamilton Tiger-Cats | W 25–19 | 5–4–1 | Ivor Wynne Stadium | 24,770 |
| 13 | 11 | Sept 12 | at Edmonton Eskimos | L 20–42 | 5–5–1 | Commonwealth Stadium | 40,486 |
| 14 | 13 | Sept 20 | vs. Hamilton Tiger-Cats | W 39–29 | 6–5–1 | Exhibition Stadium | 26,619 |
| 15 | Bye | | | | | | |
| 16 | 13 | Oct 4 | vs. BC Lions | W 33–14 | 7–5–1 | Exhibition Stadium | 26,232 |
| 17 | 14 | Oct 9 | at Ottawa Rough Riders | W 30–22 | 8–5–1 | Lansdowne Park | 16,541 |
| 18 | 15 | Oct 16 | vs. Ottawa Rough Riders | W 20–17 | 9–5–1 | Exhibition Stadium | 21,127 |
| 19 | 16 | Oct 23 | vs. Saskatchewan Roughriders | W 25–3 | 10–5–1 | Exhibition Stadium | 22,329 |
| 20 | 17 | Nov 1 | at Winnipeg Blue Bombers | L 23–24 | 10–6–1 | Winnipeg Stadium | 26,288 |
| 21 | 18 | Nov 8 | vs. Winnipeg Blue Bombers | W 20–18 | 11–6–1 | Exhibition Stadium | 21,042 |

== Postseason ==
| Round | Date | Opponent | Results | | Venue | Attendance |
| Round | Date | Opponent | Score | Record | Venue | Attendance |
|---|---|---|---|---|---|---|
| East Semi-Final | Sun, Nov 15 | vs. Hamilton Tiger-Cats | W 29–13 | 1–0 | Exhibition Stadium | 21,339 |
| East Final | Sun, Nov 22 | at Winnipeg Blue Bombers | W 19–3 | 2–0 | Winnipeg Stadium | 32,946 |
| Grey Cup | Sun, Nov 29 | vs. Edmonton Eskimos | L 36–38 | 2–1 | BC Place | 59,478 |

=== Grey Cup ===
| Team | Q1 | Q2 | Q3 | Q4 | Total |
|---|---|---|---|---|---|
| Toronto Argonauts | 3 | 21 | 3 | 9 | 36 |
| Edmonton Eskimos | 10 | 7 | 4 | 17 | 38 |

== Roster ==
1987 Toronto Argonauts final roster
| Quarterbacks: 11 Danny Barrett; 16 John Congemi; 14 Gilbert Renfroe; Running backs: 20 Kevin Cummings; 6 Gill Fenerty; 31 George Ganas; 37 Warren Hudson; 23 Tony Johns; 33 Brian Walling; Receivers: 30 Dwight Edwards; 80 Ken Joiner; 25 Paul Pearson; 12 Mike Siroishka; 1 Darrell Smith; 88 Jeff Smith; 9 Gene Thomas | Offensive linemen: 51 Randy Ambrosie G; 56 Ian Beckstead C; 69 Dan Ferrone G; 63 Jim Kardash T; 65 Dan Petschenig G; 66 Kelvin Pruenster T; 67 Chris Schultz T; 64 Bob Skemp G/C; Defensive linemen: 99 Jearld Baylis DT; 77 Rodney Harding DT; 68 Glenn Kulka DE; 54 Blaine Schmidt DT/DE; 70 Dan Sellers DE | Linebackers: 35 Bruce Elliott; 39 Doug Landry; 36 Don Moen; 32 Willie Pless; Defensive backs: 10 Darnell Clash; 13 Dave Daniels; 26 Selwyn Drain; 27 Doran Major; 2 Reggie Pleasant; 29 Rick Ryan; 24 Jake Vaughan; Special teams: 4 Lance Chomyc K; 8 Hank Ilesic P/K; Italics indicate International player |
