= Paul Clatney =

Canadian football player (b. 1963)

No. 29
- Positions: Defensive back, Linebacker

Personal information
- Born: December 5, 1963 (age 62); Toronto, Ontario, Canada
- Listed height: 6 ft 2 in (1.88 m)
- Listed weight: 205 lb (93 kg)

Career information
- University: McMaster
- CFL draft: 1986: 8th round, 71st overall pick

Career history
- 1986–1987: Hamilton Tiger-Cats
- 1987–1989: Winnipeg Blue Bombers
- 1990–1992: Calgary Stampeders
- 1994: Ottawa Rough Riders
- 1994: Toronto Argonauts

Awards and highlights
- 3× Grey Cup champion (1986, 1988, 1992)

Paul Clatney (born December 5, 1963) is a Canadian former professional football defensive back and linebacker who played six seasons in the Canadian Football League (CFL) with the Winnipeg Blue Bombers, Calgary Stampeders, Ottawa Rough Riders and Toronto Argonauts. He was selected by the Hamilton Tiger-Cats in the eighth round of the 1986 CFL draft after playing CIAU football at McMaster University.

== College career ==
Clatney played 2 years of CIAU football for the McMaster Marauders. He was the Marauder’s rookie of the year in 1985, and an OUAA All-Star and CIAU All-Canadian in 1986. He also wrestled four years for the Marauders, winning Silver and Bronze medals at the CIAU Championships. Clatney was a member of Ontario University Athletic Association championship wrestling teams in 1985 and 1986. He was also on the CIAU championship team in 1985. He won one silver and two OUAA individual championships (gold). Clatney was inducted into McMaster University’s Athletic Hall of Fame in 2009 and once again in 2015 as a team member of the 1985 CIAU championship wrestling team.

== Professional career ==
Clatney was selected by the Hamilton Tiger-Cats in the eighth round with the 71st overall pick in the 1986 CFL draft. He participated in 2 exhibition games and spent the entire season on the practice roster, except for the months of September and October while he returned to University to play a second season for the McMaster Marauders. The Tiger-Cats won the 74th Grey Cup in 1986. Clatney began the 1987 season on Hamilton's practice roster.

He was signed to the Winnipeg Blue Bombers practice roster for the remainder of the 1987 season. He played in every game in 1988 and 1989, winning the 76th Grey Cup in 1988.

Clatney played for the Calgary Stampeders from 1990 to 1992, winning the 80th Grey Cup in 1992. He also set a CFL record in 1991 for the most special teams tackles in one game, with seven.

He dressed in nine games for the Ottawa Rough Riders in 1994. In mid-October 1994, the Toronto Argonauts acquired Clatney's rights from the Rough Riders. Clatney dressed in four games for Toronoto during the 1994 season; his last in the CFL.

== Other sports ==
Clatney was a member of the Canadian Bobsled team from 1988 to 1990, winning a bronze medal in the two-man event as a brakeman with driver Greg Haydenluck at the World Cup in Calgary in 1989.

Clatney played inline hockey for the Calgary Rad'z of Roller Hockey International in 1993. He also played ice hockey for the Madison Monsters of the Colonial Hockey League during the 1995–96 season.

== Personal life ==
Clatney has worked as a firefighter since his playing career. He, along with eight other former CFL players who were policeman or firemen, took part in the 100th Grey Cup festivities.
