= Larry Moore =

Larry Moore may refer to:

- Larry Moore (American football) (born 1975), professional football player
- Larry Moore (reporter) (born 1945), American television newscaster
- Larry Moore (basketball) (1942–2016), American professional basketball player

== See also ==
- Larry Mohr (born 1961), Canadian football running back
- Lawrence Mohr (disambiguation)
