= Lawrence Mohr =

Lawrence Mohr may refer to:

- Lawrence B. Mohr (born 1931), American political scientist
- Lawrence C. Mohr Jr., physician to the presidents Ronald Reagan, George H. W. Bush, and briefly Bill Clinton

== See also ==
- Larry Mohr (born 1961), Canadian football running back
- Larry Moore (disambiguation)
