= Marina High School =

Marina High School may refer to:

- Marina High School (Huntington Beach, California)
- Marina High School (Marina, California)
- Marina High School (San Leandro, California)
