= 1986 CFL draft =

Canadian football draft

The 1986 CFL draft composed of eight rounds where 72 Canadian football players were chosen from eligible Canadian universities and Canadian players playing in the NCAA.

== 1st round ==
= CFL Division All-Star	= CFL All-Star	= Hall of Famer

Pick #	CFL team	Player	Position	School
1	Calgary Stampeders	Kent Warnock	DE	Calgary
2	Saskatchewan Roughriders	Rueben Mayes	RB	Washington State
3	Toronto Argonauts	Markus Koch	DE	Boise State
4	Ottawa Rough Riders	Michael Schad	T	Queen's
5	Montreal Concordes	Matt Finlay	LB	Eastern Michigan
6	Edmonton Eskimos	John Coflinn	OL	Simon Fraser
7	Winnipeg Blue Bombers	Brian Belway	DL	Calgary
8	Hamilton Tiger-Cats	Jeff Watson	T	Saint Mary's
9	BC Lions	Paul Nastasiuk	RB	Wilfrid Laurier

== 2nd round ==
= CFL Division All-Star	= CFL All-Star	= Hall of Famer

Pick #	CFL team	Player	Position	School
10	Toronto Argonauts	Donohue Grant	DB	Simon Fraser
11	Saskatchewan Roughriders	James Ellingson	WR	British Columbia
12	Toronto Argonauts	Dwayne Derban	LB	British Columbia
13	Ottawa Rough Riders	Bob Harding	SB	York
14	Calgary Stampeders	Andy Stubbert	RB/FB	Queen's
15	Edmonton Eskimos	Jeff Volpe	DB	Guelph
16	Winnipeg Blue Bombers	Darryl Sampson	DB	York
17	Edmonton Eskimos	Blaine Schmidt	DE	Guelph
18	BC Lions	Mark Turner	DL	Miami (Ohio)

== 3rd round ==
Pick #	CFL team	Player	Position	School
19	Calgary Stampeders	Mike Torresan	G	British Columbia
20	Saskatchewan Roughriders	Dave McEachern	DB	Princeton
21	Calgary Stampeders	Dave Pappin	LB	McMaster
22	Toronto Argonauts	Mike Siroishka	WR	Calgary
23	Ottawa Rough Riders	Chuck Wust	DB	Acadia
24	Edmonton Eskimos	Greg McCormack	DL	Simon Fraser
25	British Columbia Lions	Ron Crick	LB	Idaho State
26	Hamilton Tiger-Cats	Greg Reynard	DL	Western Montana
27	British Columbia Lions	Bob Skemp	C	British Columbia

== 4th round ==
Pick #	CFL team	Player	Position	School
28	Calgary Stampeders	Steve Hudson	T/G	Queen's
29	Ottawa Rough Riders	Rob Taylor	DE/OL	Toronto
30	Saskatchewan Roughriders	Tony Brown	K	San Jose State University
31	Ottawa Rough Riders	Angus Donnelly	DE	Carleton
32	Montreal Concordes	Peter Hess	TE/SB	Mount Allison
33	Edmonton Eskimos	Michael Pauls	TB/FB	Simon Fraser
34	Winnipeg Blue Bombers	David Taylor	TE	Simon Fraser
35	Hamilton Tiger-Cats	Rick Lococo	C	York
36	British Columbia Lions	Scott Lecky	WR	Guelph

== 5th round ==
= CFL Division All-Star	= CFL All-Star	= Hall of Famer

Pick #	CFL team	Player	Position	School
37	Calgary Stampeders	Tyler Robinson	DB	Calgary
38	Saskatchewan Roughriders	Bill Henry	DL	British Columbia
39	Toronto Argonauts	Brian Cluff	G	Guelph
40	Winnipeg Blue Bombers	Ian McLellan	OT/FB	Simon Fraser
41	Montreal Concordes	Jim Spreadbrow	DE	Windsor
42	Edmonton Eskimos	Andrew Stephan	G	Alberta
43	Saskatchewan Roughriders	Glenn Harper	P	Washington State
44	Hamilton Tiger-Cats	Peter Curwin	DE	Saint Mary's
45	BC Lions	Peter Jeffrey	T	Simon Fraser

== 6th round ==
Pick #	CFL team	Player	Position	School
46	Calgary Stampeders	Albert Calaguiro	TB	Concordia
47	Saskatchewan Roughriders	Elio Geremia	TB	Calgary
48	Toronto Argonauts	Bruce Elliot	LB	Western Ontario
49	Ottawa Rough Riders	Richard Storey	DL	McMaster
50	Montreal Concordes	Dennis Touchette	DL	McGill
51	Edmonton Eskimos	Darrelle Monzer	DL	Alberta
52	Winnipeg Blue Bombers	Trevor Hollett	DB	Manitoba
53	Hamilton Tiger-Cats	Mike Jellema	LB	Simon Fraser
54	British Columbia Lions	Floyd Mingo	DB	Simon Fraser

== 7th round ==
= CFL Division All-Star	= CFL All-Star	= Hall of Famer

Pick #	CFL team	Player	Position	School
55	Calgary Stampeders	Keith Holliday	LB	Calgary
56	Saskatchewan Roughriders	Dave Ostertag	DB	Saskatchewan
57	Toronto Argonauts	Eric Jensen	T	York
58	Ottawa Rough Riders	Devon Hanson	DB	York
59	Montreal Concordes	Paul Johnson	WR	Mount Allison
60	Edmonton Eskimos	Stuart Bundy	OL	Western Kentucky
61	Winnipeg Blue Bombers	Craig Watson	DB	British Columbia
62	Hamilton Tiger-Cats	Steve Pozzobon	DE/LB	Cornell
63	BC Lions	Paul Osbaldiston	K/P	Western Montana

== 8th round ==
Pick #	CFL team	Player	Position	School
64	Calgary Stampeders	John Smith	LB	Calgary
65	Saskatchewan Roughriders	Calvin Sikorski	LB	Minot State
66	Toronto Argonauts	Steve Del Zotto	WR	York
67	Ottawa Rough Riders	Andre Van Vugt	T	Windsor
68	Montreal Concordes	Vince Salazar	CB	Toronto
69	Edmonton Eskimos	Gerald Telidetski	LB	Alberta
70	Winnipeg Blue Bombers	Jadrin Minaravic	K	St. Francis Xavier
71	Hamilton Tiger-Cats	Paul Clatney	DB	McMaster
72	British Columbia Lions	Steve Bernstein	DB	Simon Fraser
