= Canadian Football League Canada Day games =

Canadian Football League Canada Day games are an occasional part of the league's schedule and occur only when the league schedule begins on or before July 1. The games are not an annual occurrence, unlike the Labour Day or Thanksgiving Day games. As of the 2023 CFL season, there have been 24 games played on Canada Day.

== History ==
In 1984, the CFL played regular season games in June for the first time in league history. Consequently, the league also had its first Canada Day regular season game that year, with the Toronto Argonauts defeating the host Saskatchewan Roughriders 25–10. After the league expanded to an 18-game schedule in 1986, the chances of a Canada Day game became greater with an earlier start to the season and a second one was played in 1987. When the Montreal Alouettes franchise folded after the 1987 pre-season and the league reverted to eight teams, the regular season schedule didn't start until the second week of July.

When the league expended to 13 teams in 1995, scheduling difficulties necessitated an earlier start to the season, on June 28, 1995. Two games, one involving Canadian teams, were held on July 1. (While the San Antonio Texans hosted the Shreveport Pirates on July 1, 1995, this game was held between American teams in the United States, where Canada Day is not observed; no games were hosted in the U.S. on the Fourth of July.) Following the collapse of the CFL American teams and the Ottawa Rough Riders, the CFL was once again an eight-team league and typically started after July 1. The league did, however, have its first true Canada Day doubleheader in 1998, which was also the first time that the league began the regular season on Canada Day.

When the CFL returned to Ottawa in 2002, it again meant that the regular season schedule would begin in June and Canada Day games would return. Games were played on July 1 in 2003, 2005, and 2006, with the league originally scheduling the Montreal Alouettes and Ottawa Renegades to play in Ottawa in 2006. However, the Ottawa franchise again ceased operations, leaving the league to again start the season later. Despite previous trends of a later schedule start, the CFL made more of an effort to include Canada Day games, promoting a Canada Day season opener in 2009 that also featured the first Canada Day Grey Cup rematch. The league also played Canada Day games in 2009, 2010, 2011, and 2012, with the Calgary Stampeders hosting for four consecutive years.

As of the 2023 CFL season, Calgary has been the most frequent home team having hosted nine of 23 Canada Day games while never being a visitor. The Argonauts and Lions have never hosted a Canada Day game, but have been the visiting team on multiple occasions. Canada Day games have historically been played when Canada Day falls between Wednesday and Sunday, with the exception coming in 2003 when the Tuesday Canada Day game was played during a week that featured five games being played.

== Results ==
=== By year ===
Season	Day	Visiting team	Score	Home team	Source
1984	Sunday	Toronto Argonauts	25–10	Saskatchewan Roughriders	
1987	Wednesday	BC Lions	40–15	Calgary Stampeders	
1995	Saturday	Toronto Argonauts	23–45	Edmonton Eskimos	
1995	Saturday	San Antonio Texans	47–24	Shreveport Pirates	
1998	Wednesday	Montreal Alouettes	27–24	Winnipeg Blue Bombers	
1998	Wednesday	Hamilton Tiger-Cats	20–21	Calgary Stampeders	
2003	Tuesday	Edmonton Eskimos	12–14	Winnipeg Blue Bombers	
2003	Tuesday	Ottawa Renegades	12–32	Calgary Stampeders	
2005	Friday	Montreal Alouettes	36–39 (OT)	Ottawa Renegades	
2005	Friday	Toronto Argonauts	22–16	Calgary Stampeders	
2006	Saturday	Edmonton Eskimos	10–46	Winnipeg Blue Bombers	
2009	Wednesday	Toronto Argonauts	30–17	Hamilton Tiger-Cats	
2009	Wednesday	Montreal Alouettes	40–27	Calgary Stampeders	
2010	Thursday	Montreal Alouettes	51–54 (OT)	Saskatchewan Roughriders	
2010	Thursday	Toronto Argonauts	16–30	Calgary Stampeders	
2011	Friday	Winnipeg Blue Bombers	24–16	Hamilton Tiger-Cats	
2011	Friday	Toronto Argonauts	23–21	Calgary Stampeders	
2012	Sunday	Montreal Alouettes	10–38	Calgary Stampeders	
2016	Friday	BC Lions	28–3	Hamilton Tiger-Cats	
2016	Friday	Winnipeg Blue Bombers	22–36	Calgary Stampeders	
2017	Saturday	Winnipeg Blue Bombers	43–40 (2OT)	Saskatchewan Roughriders	
2019	Monday	Toronto Argonauts	7–32	Saskatchewan Roughriders	
2022	Friday	Edmonton Elks	29–25	Hamilton Tiger-Cats	
2023	Saturday	Winnipeg Blue Bombers	17–3	Montreal Alouettes	

=== By appearance ===
Appearances	Hosted	Team	Wins	Losses	Ties	Win %	Streak
9	9	Calgary Stampeders	5	4	0	0.556	W2
7	0	Toronto Argonauts	4	3	0	0.571	L1
7	3	Winnipeg Blue Bombers	5	2	0	0.714	W2
6	1	Montreal Alouettes	2	4	0	0.333	L3
5	4	Hamilton Tiger-Cats	0	5	0	0.000	L5
4	4	Saskatchewan Roughriders	2	2	0	0.500	W1
4	1	Edmonton Eskimos/Elks	2	2	0	0.500	W2
2	0	BC Lions	2	0	0	1.000	W2
2	1	Ottawa Renegades	1	1	0	0.500	W1
1	0	San Antonio Texans	1	0	0	1.000	W1
1	1	Shreveport Pirates	0	1	0	0.000	L1
