= Dave Albright =

American gridiron football player (1960–2023)

Profile
- Position: Linebacker

Personal information
- Born: January 25, 1960; Oakland, California, U.S.
- Died: January 26, 2023 (aged 63); Redondo Beach, California, U.S.
- Listed height: 6 ft 2 in (1.88 m)
- Listed weight: 235 lb (107 kg)

Career information
- High school: Marina HS
- College: San Jose State

Career history
- 1985: Memphis Showboats
- 1986–1991: Saskatchewan Roughriders

Awards and highlights
- Grey Cup champion (1989)

David J. Albright (January 25, 1960 – January 26, 2023) was an American gridiron football linebacker who played for the Saskatchewan Roughriders of the Canadian Football League (CFL). He played high school football for Marina High School and college football at Chabot College. He later transferred to San Jose State University and played for the Spartans. From 1986 to 1991, Albright recorded 377 tackles and 12 sacks with the Roughriders over 76 games.

== Professional career ==
In 1985, Albright played with the Memphis Showboats of the United States Football League (USFL) and helped them reach the semifinals. When the USFL folded the following year, the Saskatchewan Roughriders signed Albright. He played in eight regular season games as a rookie in the CFL, but he made no tackles. In 1987, Albright broke out with 118 tackles and two sacks, setting the record for most defensive tackles in a season. Albright continued to play a major role the following season with 92 tackles and five sacks.

Albright's 1989 season was hampered by injuries. In July, he pulled his leg muscles. He broke his left hand later in the season, but continued playing in a cast until he also broke his right arm. Albright's arm required surgery and he missed six games. While recovering, Albright also had knee surgery to remove damaged cartilage that had bothered him since the first game of the season. He returned in time for the playoffs and contributed to the Roughriders' championship run. In the West semifinal, Albright intercepted Calgary Stampeders quarterback Danny Barrett. He also recovered a fumble for a 62-yard touchdown in the West final and was credited by Toronto Star reporter Paul Hunter with "turn[ing] the momentum" against the Edmonton Eskimos in the 32–21 upset. The Roughriders went on to win the 77th Grey Cup against the Hamilton Tiger-Cats 43–40. Albright ended the regular season with 79 tackles.

In the 1990 season, Albright again missed substantial time due to injury after requiring foot surgery. He ended the season with 44 tackles after playing in eleven regular season games. Albright made 44 tackles and one sack across nine games in 1991 before retiring.

== Death ==
Albright died of a heart attack on January 26, 2023, the day after his 63rd birthday.

=== Season statistics ===
Year	Team	GP	Tkls	Sacks	FR	INT
1986	SAS	8	0	2	2	0
1987	SAS	18	118	2	2	0
1988	SAS	18	92	5	2	1
1989	SAS	12	79	1	2	0
1990	SAS	11	44	0	0	0
1991	SAS	9	44	2	0	0
Total		76	377	12	8	1
