= Joe Faragalli =

American gridiron football player and coach (1929–2006)

Profile
- Position: Guard

Personal information
- Born: April 18, 1929; Philadelphia, Pennsylvania, U.S.
- Died: April 10, 2006 (aged 76); Narragansett, Rhode Island, U.S.

Career information
- College: Villanova
- NFL draft: 1954: 12th round, 138th overall pick

Career history
- 1967–1969: Winnipeg Blue Bombers (OL)
- 1970–1972: Brown (OL)
- 1973: Marshall (OC)
- 1975: Oklahoma State (OL)
- 1976: Winnipeg Blue Bombers (OL)
- 1977–1980: Edmonton Eskimos (OL)
- 1981–1983: Saskatchewan Roughriders
- 1984: Cincinnati Bengals (WR/QB)
- 1985: Houston Oilers (OC)
- 1986: Buffalo Bills (TE)
- 1987: Montreal Alouettes
- 1987–1990: Edmonton Eskimos
- 1991: Ottawa Rough Riders
- 1991-1992: Montreal Machine (OC)

Awards and highlights
- 4× Grey Cup champion (1978, 1979, 1980, 1987); Annis Stukus Trophy (1981)

Joe Faragalli (April 18, 1929 – April 10, 2006) was an American gridiron football player and coach who had most of his success in the Canadian Football League (CFL). Faragalli played guard at Villanova University from 1950 to 1953, and was the team captain all four years. He was drafted by the Chicago Bears in the 12th round (138th overall pick) of the 1954 NFL draft. He served four years in Germany with the United States Army and went on to coach college football in the United States.

== Coaching career ==
Known affectionately throughout the CFL as "Papa Joe", Faragalli joined the Winnipeg Blue Bombers in 1967 as an offensive coach. In 1981, he became head coach of the Saskatchewan Roughriders and was awarded the Annis Stukus Trophy as Coach of the Year; the team, 2–14 in each of the preceding two seasons, finished with a 9–7 record in 1981. (Despite the improvement, the team narrowly missed the playoffs.) Faragalli was replaced by Reuben Berry after a 1–5 start to Saskatchewan's 1983 season.

Faragalli's greatest CFL coaching achievement, in 1987, almost never happened. He began that year as coach of the Montreal Alouettes, but the franchise ceased operations days before the start of the season. After Jackie Parker resigned as Edmonton Eskimos coach two games into the year for health reasons, Faragalli was hired to replace him, and led the team to a Grey Cup win against the Toronto Argonauts.

The Eskimos played in the 1990 Grey Cup game under Faragalli, but lost to Winnipeg. He coached the Ottawa Rough Riders in 1991. After departing from the Eskimos in 1990, he served as the offensive co-ordinator for the World League of American Football's Montreal Machine in 1991 and 1992, in between that one season in Ottawa.

During the 1980s and early 1990s, he worked as an assistant coach with the Cincinnati Bengals, Houston Oilers, Buffalo Bills and the WLAF's Montreal Machine. His son Mike also coached in the CFL.

Faragalli died in Narragansett, Rhode Island on April 10, 2006, of heart failure eight days before his 77th birthday and approximately one month before his 50th wedding anniversary.

== Head coaching record ==
=== CFL ===
Team	Year	Regular season					Postseason		
Team	Year	Won	Lost	Ties	Win %	Finish	Won	Lost	Result
SSK	1981	9	7	0	.563	4th in West Division	–	–	Missed playoffs
SSK	1982	6	9	1	.406	5th in West Division	–	–	Missed playoffs
SSK	1983	1	5	0	.167	5th in West Division	–	–	(fired)
SSK total		16	21	1	.377	0 West Division; Championships	-	-	0 Grey Cups
EDM	1987	9	7	0	.563	2nd in West Division	3	0	Won Grey Cup
EDM	1988	11	7	0	.611	1st in West Division	0	1	Lost in Division Finals
EDM	1989	16	2	0	.889	1st in West Division	0	1	Lost in Division Finals
EDM	1990	10	8	0	.556	2nd in West Division	2	1	Lost Grey Cup
EDM total		46	24	0	.657	2 West Division; Championships	5	3	1 Grey Cup
OTT	1991	7	11	0	.389	3rd in East Division	0	1	Lost in Division Semi-Finals
OTT total		7	11	0	.389	0 East Division; Championships	0	1	0 Grey Cups
Total		68	56	1	.571	2 West Division; Championships	5	4	1 Grey Cup'
