= Craig Shaffer =

American football player (born 1959)

No. 53, 55, 43, 23
- Position: Linebacker

Personal information
- Born: March 31, 1959 (age 67); Terre Haute, Indiana, U.S.
- Listed height: 6 ft 0 in (1.83 m)
- Listed weight: 230 lb (104 kg)

Career information
- High school: Terre Haute (IN) Schulte
- College: Indiana State
- NFL draft: 1982: 6th round, 150th overall pick

Career history
- St. Louis Cardinals (1982–1984); Denver Broncos (1984)*; Edmonton Eskimos (1985–1986); Ottawa Rough Riders (1987); Edmonton Eskimos (1987–1988)
- * Offseason or practice squad member only

Awards and highlights
- Grey Cup champion (1987)
- Stats at Pro Football Reference

Craig Shaffer (born March 31, 1959) is an American former professional football linebacker. He played for the St. Louis Cardinals from 1982 to 1984.
