= 1985 CFL draft =

Canadian football draft

The 1985 CFL draft composed of nine rounds where 81 Canadian football players were chosen from eligible Canadian universities and Canadian players playing in the NCAA. The 1985 draft was the first draft in Canadian Football League history wherein there were no territorial exemptions provided for teams to only draft players from the region in Canada where they were located.

== 1st round ==
Pick #	CFL team	Player	Position	School
1	Ottawa Rough Riders	Nicholas Benjamin	OL	Concordia
2	Calgary Stampeders	Randy Ambrosie	OL	Manitoba
3	BC Lions	John Ulmer	DE	North Dakota
4	Montreal Concordes	Tony Johnson	TB	Henderson State
5	Edmonton Eskimos	Peter Emsky	OL	Washington State
6	Winnipeg Blue Bombers	Pat Langdon	TE	Tennessee
7	BC Lions	Rick Ryan	DB	Weber State
8	Hamilton Tiger-Cats	Jed Tommy	TB	Guelph
9	Winnipeg Blue Bombers	Robert Molle	DE	Simon Fraser

== 2nd round ==
Pick #	CFL team	Player	Position	School
10	Ottawa Rough Riders	Tom Munroe	WR	British Columbia
11	Calgary Stampeders	Garrett Doll	LB	Alberta
12	Saskatchewan Roughriders	David Conrad	TE	Acadia
13	Montreal Concordes	Scott Robson	C	North Dakota
14	BC Lions	Bruce Barnett	DB	British Columbia
15	Calgary Stampeders	Tom Spoltenini	T	Calgary
16	BC Lions	Joe Pariselli	TB	York
17	Hamilton Tiger-Cats	Lance Thompson	LB	Carleton
18	Winnipeg Blue Bombers	Derron Vernon	TB	Eastern Michigan

== 3rd round ==
Pick #	CFL team	Player	Position	School
19	Ottawa Rough Riders	Neri Fratin	TB	Ottawa
20	Calgary Stampeders	Wes Cooper	TB	Weber State
21	Saskatchewan Roughriders	Gerald Lashyn	LB	Saskatchewan
22	BC Lions	Bob Jedicke	DL	Western Ontario
23	Edmonton Eskimos	Mark Horvath	DB	McMaster
24	Toronto Argonauts	Don Adamic	OL	British Columbia
25	Edmonton Eskimos	Renzo Passaretti	LB	Saint Mary's
26	BC Lions	Chris Spence	TB	Simon Fraser
27	Winnipeg Blue Bombers	Rob Prodanovic	DL	Calgary

== 4th round ==
Pick #	CFL team	Player	Position	School
28	Saskatchewan Roughriders	Tony Dennis	WR	Simon Fraser
29	Calgary Stampeders	Scott Bissessar	WR	Queen's
30	Saskatchewan Roughriders	Lloyd Clefstad	DT	Simon Fraser
31	Montreal Concordes	Mike O'Donnell	QB	Manitoba
32	Edmonton Eskimos	Clorindo Grilli	TB	McMaster
33	Toronto Argonauts	Kristen Keillor	T	Wilfrid Laurier
34	BC Lions	Kurt Wilchuck	LB	Oregon
35	Ottawa Rough Riders	Marty Palazeti	DE	Marshall
36	Hamilton Tiger-Cats	Dale Sanderson	C	Tennessee

== 5th round ==
Pick #	CFL team	Player	Position	School
37	Saskatchewan Roughriders	Steve Crane	DB	Acadia
38	Calgary Stampeders	Terry Cochrane	TB	British Columbia
39	Saskatchewan Roughriders	Rob Bresciani	WR	Saskatchewan
40	Montreal Concordes	Bloyce Bulman	DE	Mount Allison
41	Edmonton Eskimos	Tom Richards	TB	Alberta
42	Toronto Argonauts	Dan Petschenig	OL	Carleton
43	BC Lions	John Moffatt	WR	Western Ontario
44	Hamilton Tiger-Cats	Glen Miller	SB	McGill
45	Winnipeg Blue Bombers	Glenn Steele	TB	British Columbia

== 6th round ==
Pick #	CFL team	Player	Position	School
46	Ottawa Rough Riders	Lance Chomyc	K/P	Toronto
47	Calgary Stampeders	Joe Mahnic	TB	Saskatchewan
48	Saskatchewan Roughriders	Jerry Nash	DB	Alberta
49	Montreal Concordes	Mark Clatney	DT	Moorhead State
50	Edmonton Eskimos	Harold Riemer	OL	Alberta
51	Toronto Argonauts	Alex Troop	LB	Wilfrid Laurier
53	Hamilton Tiger-Cats	Lance Harry	G	Concordia
54	Winnipeg Blue Bombers	Greg Miller	LB	Concordia

== 7th round ==
Pick #	CFL team	Player	Position	School
55	Ottawa Rough Riders	George Ganas	TB	York
56	Calgary Stampeders	Roger DesLauriers	DB	British Columbia
57	Saskatchewan Roughriders	Mark Urness	G	Boise State
58	Montreal Concordes	Donovan Brown	DB	York
59	Edmonton Eskimos	Bill Starke	WR	Western Ontario
60	Toronto Argonauts	Andy Filipuik	WR	Toronto
61	Winnipeg Blue Bombers	Doug Campbell	LB	Alberta
62	Hamilton Tiger-Cats	John Lepore	TB	Guelph
63	Winnipeg Blue Bombers	Randy Saunders	TE	Simon Fraser

== 8th round ==
Pick #	CFL team	Player	Position	School
64	Ottawa Rough Riders	Morris Elfenbaum	OL	Minot State
65	Calgary Stampeders	James Whute	WR	Simon Fraser
66	Saskatchewan Roughriders	Roger Mayer	DL	Concordia
67	Montreal Concordes	David Binkle	LB	Panhandle State
68	Edmonton Eskimos	Dana Donald	DB	Alberta
69	Toronto Argonauts	Nolan Duke	C	Wilfrid Laurier
70	BC Lions	John Melvin	DL	British Columbia
71	Hamilton Tiger-Cats	Brian Bone	WR	Western Ontario
72	Winnipeg Blue Bombers	Randy Fabi	WR	Western Ontario

== 9th round ==
Pick #	CFL team	Player	Position	School
73	Ottawa Rough Riders	Craig Keenan	QB	Colorado
74	Calgary Stampeders	Robin Simpson	OL	Calgary
75	Saskatchewan Roughriders	Colum Armstrong	K	Acadia
76	Montreal Concordes	Denis Boisclair	K/P	Illinois
77	Edmonton Eskimos	Mike McLean	LB	Alberta
78	Toronto Argonauts	Kevin Reaume	TE	St. Francis Xavier
79	British Columbia Lions	Bob Ros	TE	British Columbia
80	Hamilton Tiger-Cats	Sean McKenna	LB	McMaster
81	Winnipeg Blue Bombers	Ron St. Mars	LB	Manitoba
