= 1979 CFL draft =

Canadian football draft

The 1979 CFL draft composed of seven rounds where 81 Canadian football players were chosen from eligible Canadian universities and Canadian players playing in the NCAA. A total of 18 players were selected as territorial exemptions, with all nine teams making at least one selection in this stage of the draft.

== Territorial exemptions ==
Toronto Argonauts Mike McTague WR North Dakota State

Saskatchewan Roughriders Al Johns DT Pacific University

Saskatchewan Roughriders Tim Hook G Montana

British Columbia Lions Nick Hebeler DT Simon Fraser

British Columbia Lions Ron Morehouse LB San Diego State

Hamilton Tiger-Cats John Priestner LB Western Ontario

Hamilton Tiger-Cats Jim Reid TB Wilfrid Laurier

Winnipeg Blue Bombers Rick Chernoff TE Manitoba

Winnipeg Blue Bombers Bill Yaworsky DE Manitoba

Ottawa Rough Riders Malcolm Inglis OT Carleton

Ottawa Rough Riders Pat Stoqua DB Carleton

Calgary Stampeders Tom Krebs G Utah

Calgary Stampeders Doug Battershill DB Weber State

Calgary Stampeders Rob Forbes FB Drake

Montreal Alouettes Nick Arakgi TE Bishop's

Montreal Alouettes Phil Colwell TB Wilfrid Laurier

Edmonton Eskimos Marco Cyncar DB Alberta

Edmonton Eskimos Kerry O'Connor TB Alberta

== 1st round ==
1. Toronto Argonauts Kevin Powell OT Utah State

2. Saskatchewan Roughriders Al Chorney DB British Columbia

3. British Columbia Lions Mark Houghton TB California State

4. Saskatchewan Roughriders Gerry Hornett OT Simon Fraser

5. Winnipeg Blue Bombers Rick House TB Simon Fraser

6. Ottawa Rough Riders Carman Cartieri LB Montana

7. Calgary Stampeders Darrell Moir WR Calgary

8. Calgary Stampeders Daryl Burko LB Saskatchewan

9. Edmonton Eskimos Dan Brown TE Calgary

== 2nd round ==
10. Toronto Argonauts Dan Huculak TB Simon Fraser

11. Saskatchewan Roughriders Bernie Crump DB British Columbia

12. British Columbia Lions Chris Curran DB Western Ontario

13. Hamilton Tiger-Cats Jim O'Keefe DB Wilfrid Laurier

14. Winnipeg Blue Bombers Jim Dziedzina TE Simon Fraser

15. Ottawa Rough Riders Al Dosant DB Windsor

16. Calgary Stampeders Ed Thomas DB Boise State

17. Hamilton Tiger-Cats Walt Payerl WR Western Ontario

18. Edmonton Eskimos Paul Shugart TE Queen's

== 3rd round ==
19. Montreal Alouettes Ed Szpytma DE McMaster

20. British Columbia Lions Kevin Aver DB St. Francis Xavier

21. British Columbia Lions Murray Watson DE Western Ontario

22. Winnipeg Blue Bombers Walt Passaglia WR Simon Fraser

23. Winnipeg Blue Bombers Doug Biggerstaff DE British Columbia

24. Montreal Alouettes Adrian Polesel T McMaster

25. Calgary Stampeders Jeff Inglis OT Guelph

26. Montreal Alouettes Jim Rutka WR Queen's

27. Edmonton Eskimos Dave Roberts LB Queen's

== 4th round ==
28. Toronto Argonauts Brent Racette DE British Columbia

29. Saskatchewan Roughriders Joe Sturby LB Saskatchewan

30. British Columbia Lions Torinado Panetta LB Carleton

31. Winnipeg Blue Bombers Chris Brewer DE Acadia

32. Winnipeg Blue Bombers Jim McHugh LB McMaster

33. Ottawa Rough Riders Dave Green TB Carleton

34. Calgary Stampeders Clay Richards DB Gavilan College

35. Montreal Alouettes Roland Mangold OG Northeast Missouri State

36. Edmonton Eskimos Blair Shier T Bishop's

== 5th round ==
37. Toronto Argonauts Mark Forsyth DB Wilfrid Laurier

38. Saskatchewan Roughriders Lyle Bauer OG Weber State

39. British Columbia Lions John Mackay TB British Columbia

40. Hamilton Tiger-Cats Mark Heidebrecht DT Springfield College

41. Winnipeg Blue Bombers Bob McEachern LB Weber State

42. Ottawa Rough Riders Blaine Shore K Queen's

43. Calgary Stampeders Dan Hagen TE Waterloo-Seneca

44. Montreal Alouettes Harry Webster OT Bishop's

45. Edmonton Eskimos Gary Simpson DB Carleton

== 6th round ==
46. Toronto Argonauts Peter Racey OT Simon Fraser

47. Saskatchewan Roughriders Paul Krepinski DT Utah State

48. British Columbia Lions Berry Muis WR British Columbia

49. Hamilton Tiger-Cats Jack Davis DT Wilfrid Laurier

50. Winnipeg Blue Bombers Gerry Hatherly LB Manitoba

51. Ottawa Rough Riders Scott Spurgeon DB St. Francis Xavier

52. Calgary Stampeders Ossie Wilson DB McMaster

53. Montreal Alouettes Richard Payne LB Wilfrid Laurier

54. Edmonton Eskimos Bob Colak LB Windsor

== 7th round ==
55. Toronto Argonauts John Goodrow TB Toronto

56. Saskatchewan Roughriders Lorne DeGroot DT Alberta

57. British Columbia Lions Paul Jaffe G Carleton

58. Hamilton Tiger-Cats Peter Hepburn DT Wilfrid Laurier

59. Winnipeg Blue Bombers Barry Safinuik TB Manitoba

60. Ottawa Rough Riders Dave Behm TB Ottawa

61. Calgary Stampeders George Fieber C Manitoba

62. Montreal Alouettes Keir Cutler WR McGill

63. Edmonton Eskimos Paul Shugart TE Queen's
