= Gary Hayes =

American gridiron football player (born 1957)

No. 27, 28
- Position: Defensive back

Personal information
- Born: August 19, 1957 (age 69); Tucson, Arizona, U.S.
- Listed height: 5 ft 10 in (1.78 m)
- Listed weight: 180 lb (82 kg)

Career information
- High school: El Cerrito
- College: Fresno State
- NFL draft: 1980: undrafted

Career history
- St. Louis Cardinals (1980)*; Edmonton Eskimos (1981–1983); Green Bay Packers (1984–1986)
- * Offseason or practice squad member only

Awards and highlights
- 2× Grey Cup champion (1981, 1982)

Career NFL statistics
- Punt returns: 5
- Return yards: 24
- Stats at Pro Football Reference

Gary Hayes (born August 19, 1957) is a former defensive back in the National Football League (NFL). He played three seasons with the Green Bay Packers. Previously, he played three seasons in the Canadian Football League (CFL) with the Edmonton Eskimos, winning two Grey Cup championships with them in 1981 and 1982.
