= Kevin Powell (Canadian football) =

Canadian gridiron football player (born 1955)

Profile
- Position: Offensive tackle

Personal information
- Born: September 13, 1955 (age 71); Trail, British Columbia, Canada

Career information
- College: Utah State

Career history
- 1979–1980: Toronto Argonauts
- 1981–1987: Ottawa Rough Riders
- 1988: Edmonton Eskimos
- 1989: British Columbia Lions
- 1990: Calgary Stampeders

Awards and highlights
- 4× CFL All-Star (1983, 1985, 1986, 1987)

Kevin Powell (born September 13, 1955) is a Canadian former professional football offensive lineman who played 12 seasons in the Canadian Football League for five different teams. Number one overall pick in 1979 CFL draft by the Toronto Argonauts.

Powell played college football at Utah State University, where he was named PCAA all conference selection 1978.

Powell was involved in one of the most significant quarterback trades in CFL history as the Toronto Argonauts sought future Hall of Famer Condredge Holloway for their sputtering offence and the Ottawa Rough Riders sought the promising young Powell and $100 000.

CFL All Star: 1983, 1985, 1986, 1987.

Selected to all time Ottawa team.
