= Terry Cochrane (Canadian football) =

Canadian football player (born 1963)

No. 31, 16
- Position: Running back

Personal information
- Born: January 22, 1963 (age 63); Regina, Saskatchewan, Canada
- Listed height: 5 ft 11 in (1.80 m)
- Listed weight: 190 lb (86 kg)

Career information
- CJFL: Regina Rams
- University: UBC
- CFL draft: 1985: 5th round, 38th overall pick

Career history
- 1985: Calgary Stampeders*
- 1987: Saskatchewan Roughriders
- 1988–1990: Winnipeg Blue Bombers
- * Offseason or practice squad member only

Awards and highlights
- 2× Grey Cup champion (1988, 1990)

Terry Cochrane (born January 22, 1963) is a Canadian former professional football running back who played four seasons in the Canadian Football League (CFL) with the Saskatchewan Roughriders and Winnipeg Blue Bombers. He was selected by the Calgary Stampeders in the fifth round of the 1985 CFL draft after playing CIS football at the University of British Columbia.

== Junior football ==
Cochrane played junior football for the Regina Rams of the Canadian Junior Football League. He was named PJFC Outstanding Offensive Back and Rookie of the Year in 1982. He was also named PJFC Most Valuable Player, Outstanding Offensive Back and CJFL Outstanding Offensive Player in 1983.

== University career ==
Cochrane played CIAU football for the UBC Thunderbirds. He was named MVP of the CIAU Central Bowl and helped the Thunderbirds win the 22nd Vanier Cup in 1986 after returning for his final year of CIAU eligibility following his being drafted by the Calgary Stampeders of the CFL.

== Professional career ==
Cochrane was selected by the Calgary Stampeders with the 38th pick in the 1985 CFL draft and signed with the team.

He was signed by the Saskatchewan Roughriders in 1987 and played for them during the 1987 season.

He played for the Winnipeg Blue Bombers from 1988 to 1990, winning the 76th Grey Cup in 1988 and the 78th Grey Cup in 1990.
