= 1987 Ottawa Rough Riders season =

Canadian football team season

- Head coach: Fred Glick
- Home stadium: Lansdowne Park

Results
- Record: 3–15
- Division place: 4th, East
- Playoffs: did not qualify

Uniform

The 1987 Ottawa Rough Riders finished the season in fourth place in the East Division with a 3–15 record and failed to qualify for the post-season.

== Offseason ==
=== CFL draft ===
Rd	Pick	Player	Position	School
1	1	Leo Groenewegen	OL	British Columbia
2	10	Kyle Hall	DB	Western Ontario
2	12	Patrick Wayne	LB	Simon Fraser
4	28	Rae Robirtis	OC	British Columbia
5	37	Brent Lewis	LB	Western Ontario
6	46	Gary Lehmberg	DL	Simon Fraser
7	55	Rick Wolkensperg	WR	Western Ontario
8	64	David Waterhouse	OT	Ottawa

=== Preseason ===
Date	Opponent	Final Score	Result	Attendance	Record
June 9	at Toronto Argonauts	29–14	Win	23,156	2–0
June 15	vs. Montreal Alouettes	18–15	Win		2–0

== Regular season ==
=== Standings ===
East Division
Pos	Team	Pld	W	L	T	PF	PA	PD	Pts	Div	Stk
1	Winnipeg Blue Bombers (C, Q)	18	12	6	0	554	409	145	24	5–2	L1
2	Toronto Argonauts (Q)	18	11	6	1	484	427	57	23	6–4	W1
3	Hamilton Tiger-Cats (Q)	18	7	11	0	470	509	−39	14	4–5	L2
4	Ottawa Rough Riders	18	3	15	0	377	598	−221	6	2–6	L1

Source: "1987 Regular Season Standings". Archived from the original on 2009-10-16.
(C) First round bye; (Q) Qualified for playoffs

=== Schedule ===
Week	Date	Opponent	Score	Result	Attendance	Record
1	June 26	vs. Hamilton Tiger-Cats	36–32	Win	20,129	1–0
2	July 3	at Winnipeg Blue Bombers	51–24	Loss	23,121	1–1
3	July 11	vs. Toronto Argonauts	34–27	Win	19,699	2–1
4	July 19	vs. Montreal Alouettes	Canceled			
4	July 19	vs. Saskatchewan Roughriders	27–23	Loss	20,006	2–2
5	July 25	at BC Lions	21–1	Loss	33,771	2–3
6	July 30	at Montreal Alouettes	Canceled			
6	Bye					
7	Aug 9	vs. Calgary Stampeders	39–38	Loss	21,036	2–4
8	Aug 16	at Saskatchewan Roughriders	36–33	Loss	24,346	2–5
9	Aug 23	at Edmonton Eskimos	45–24	Loss	32,167	2–6
10	Aug 29	at Hamilton Tiger-Cats	28–23	Loss	17,447	2–7
11	Sept 3	at Montreal Alouettes	Canceled			
11	Bye					
12	Sept 11	vs. BC Lions	55–16	Loss	19,201	2–8
13	Sept 18	at Calgary Stampeders	41–19	Loss	21,483	2–9
14	Sept 26	vs. Winnipeg Blue Bombers	36–13	Loss	17,101	2–10
15	Oct 2	at Edmonton Eskimos	34–19	Loss	31,331	2–11
16	Oct 9	vs. Toronto Argonauts	30–22	Loss	16,541	2–12
17	Oct 16	at Toronto Argonauts	20–17	Loss	21,127	2–13
18	Oct 24	vs. Hamilton Tiger-Cats	28–2	Loss	16,370	2–14
19	Oct 30	at Saskatchewan Roughriders	12–9	Win	21,773	3–14
20	Nov 7	vs. Edmonton Eskimos	39–21	Loss	15,107	3–15

== Roster ==
1987 Ottawa Rough Riders final roster
Quarterbacks: 8 Todd Dillon; 6 Joe Paopao; 16 Brad Taylor; Running backs: 21 Lester Brown; 24 Tim McCray; 33 Larry Mohr; 32 Jim Reid; 19 Robert Reid; Wide receivers: 86 Gerald Alphin; 29 Jerome Erdman DB; 81 Steve Howlett; 15 Marc Lewis; 79 Rick Wolkensperg; Tight ends: 73 Mike Hudson	Offensive linemen: 68 Nick Benjamin G; 65 Roger Cattelan T; 54 Irv Daymond T/C; 69 Jerry Dobrovolny G; 57 Brad Fawcett T; 53 Leo Groenewegen G; 50 Kevin Powell T; 52 Rae Robirtis C; Defensive linemen: 61 Hasson Arbubakrr DE; 83 Michel Bourgeau DT; 89 Mike Cline DE; 64 Ron Engleson DT; 76 Loyd Lewis DE; 66 Greg Marshall DE; 67 Robert Weir DT	Linebackers: 34 Steve Harrison; 39 Bob Sebring; 23 Alex Troop; 35 Pat Wayne; 28 Anthony Woodson; Defensive backs: 27 Rod Brown; 30 Kyle Hall; 21 Will Lewis; 18 Calvin Loveall; 37 Tommie Williams; 26 Troy Wilson; Special teams: 13 Ken Clark P; 3 Tom Dixon; 2 Dean Dorsey K	Injured list: 63 Marv Allemang C; 7 Jeff Wickersham QB

Italics indicate International player

== Awards and honours ==
=== CFL awards ===
- None

=== CFL All-Stars ===
- None
