= Chris Spence (educator) =

Canadian football player and educator (born 1962)

Christopher Spence

Director of Education, Toronto District School Board
- In office 2009–2013
- Preceded by: Gerry Connelly
- Succeeded by: Donna Quan

Director of Education, Hamilton-Wentworth District School Board
- In office 2004–2009
- Succeeded by: John Malloy

Personal details
- Born: 1962 (age 63–64) England
- Children: 3
- Education: York University; University of Toronto; Ontario Institute for Studies in Education; Simon Fraser University
- Occupation: educator, public servant
- Profession: football player

Christopher M. Spence is a retired former Canadian educator, author, and former Canadian football player. He is the former Director of Education of the Toronto District School Board and former Director of Education of the Hamilton-Wentworth District School Board.

== Biography ==
Born in England to Jamaican parents, Spence has lived in Canada since he was three years old and received his early education in Windsor, Ontario. He received a B.A. degree in criminology from Simon Fraser University in 1985. A running back, he was drafted by the BC Lions in the third round of the 1985 CFL draft, but his CFL career was ended in 1988 by an Achilles tendon injury. Spence received a B.Ed. degree from York University, an M.Ed. degree from the University of Toronto in 1993, and an Ed.D. degree from the University of Toronto's Ontario Institute for Studies in Education in 1996, which was later revoked due to plagiarism.

He became Director of Education for the Hamilton-Wentworth District School Board on September 1, 2004, and served until July 2009, when he became the Director of Education for the Toronto District School Board.

== Plagiarism, resignation and revoking of teaching license ==
On January 9, 2013, Spence apologized for plagiarizing several passages in an op-ed piece he wrote for the Toronto Star on extracurricular activities. The plagiarism was verified by the Star's public editor. Among the plagiarized material was this paragraph lifted from a 1989 opinion piece in The New York Times: "We are challenged through sport to use our minds in guiding our bodies through the dimensions of time and space on the field of play. Learning the skills of sport provides opportunity to experience success." On January 10, 2013, Spence tendered his resignation as director effective immediately after additional incidents of plagiarism in earlier articles and blog entries were uncovered.

Passages from his 1996 Ed.D. dissertation were also revealed to have been copied from other sources without attribution: sentences, paragraphs, whole pages were meticulously edited so as to obscure his plagiarism. On June 20, 2017, the University of Toronto investigated the allegations, found him guilty of academic dishonesty, and rescinded his degree.

On December 20, 2016, the Ontario College of Teachers announced that Spence's teaching license had been revoked as a result of the findings of the investigation.

In 2018, Spence lost his fight to keep his Ed.D. The appeals tribunal stated that the "nature and extent [of plagiarism] found in Spence's thesis is a very serious offence." The matter, however, is not yet settled. His lawyer, Darryl Singer, wrote in an email that Spence intends to seek judicial review of the decision in Ontario divisional court.

Spence successfully appealed the revocation of his teaching licence in 2018 on the grounds that his "'precarious' mental state was not adequately accounted for." A psychiatric report stated that Spence's ability to function had been affected by "depression and suicidal ideation related to the evaporation of his marriage and career."

== Works ==
- Skin I'm in: Racism, Sports and Education (Fernwood Publishing Company, 2000, ISBN 978-1-55266-017-1)
- On Time! On Task! On a Mission! (Fernwood Publishing Company, 2002, ISBN 978-1-55266-094-2).
