= Roy Bennett (gridiron football) =

American gridiron football player (born 1961)

No. 23, 20
- Position: Defensive back

Personal information
- Born: July 5, 1961 (age 65); Birmingham, Alabama, U.S.
- Listed height: 6 ft 2 in (1.88 m)
- Listed weight: 195 lb (88 kg)

Career information
- High school: Birmingham (AL) West End
- College: Jackson State
- NFL draft: 1984: undrafted

Career history
- Dallas Cowboys (1984)*; Winnipeg Blue Bombers (1985–1987); San Diego Chargers (1988–1989); Edmonton Eskimos (1991)
- * Offseason or practice squad member only

Career NFL statistics
- Interceptions: 4
- Touchdowns: 1
- Stats at Pro Football Reference

Career CFL statistics
- Interceptions: 26
- Touchdowns: 2

Roy Mitchell Bennett (born July 5, 1961) is a former American and Canadian football defensive back in the National Football League (NFL) and Canadian Football League (CFL). He played for the San Diego Chargers of the NFL and the Winnipeg Blue Bombers and Edmonton Eskimos of the CFL. Bennett played college football at Jackson State.
