= Jim Reid (Canadian football) =

Canadian football player (born 1957)

No. 32
- Position: Running back

Personal information
- Born: November 8, 1957 (age 68); Palmerston, Ontario, Canada

Career information
- College: Wilfrid Laurier

Career history
- 1979: Hamilton Tiger-Cats
- 1980–1988: Ottawa Rough Riders

Awards and highlights
- Peter Gorman Trophy (1976); CFL East All-Star (1986)

Jim Reid (born November 8, 1957) is a Canadian former professional football fullback who played in the Canadian Football League for most of his career with the Ottawa Rough Riders.

Reid played football at Wilfrid Laurier University where he won the Peter Gorman Trophy as Rookie of the Year. Reid was part of the Hamilton Tiger-Cats' territorial exemption in the 1979 CFL draft. He did not play the full 1979 season as a result of knee surgery. Because of the knee injury, Hamilton traded Reid along with Bill Banks to Ottawa in exchange for Ray Honey.
