= Scott Flagel =

Canadian gridiron football player (born 1961)

Profile
- Position: Defensive back

Personal information
- Born: September 26, 1961 (age 65); Winnipeg, Manitoba, Canada

Career information
- College: Arizona Western College

Career history
- 1982–1987: Winnipeg Blue Bombers
- 1988: Calgary Stampeders
- 1988–1989: Hamilton Tiger-Cats
- 1989–1991: Ottawa Rough Riders

Awards and highlights
- Grey Cup champion (1984); CFL's Most Outstanding Canadian Award (1987); Lew Hayman Trophy (1987); 3× CFL All-Star (1986, 1987, 1989); 3× CFL East All-Star (1986, 1987, 1989)

Career statistics
- Games played: 218
- Interceptions: 40
- Sacks: 7
- Canadian Football Hall of Fame (Class of 2025)

Scott Flagel (born September 26, 1961) is a Canadian former professional football defensive back who played ten seasons in the Canadian Football League (CFL) for four teams. He was inducted into the Canadian Football Hall of Fame in 2025.

== Professional career ==
Flagel was the winner of the CFL's Most Outstanding Canadian Award in 1987 and was a CFL All-Star three times. He won a Grey Cup title in 1984 with the Winnipeg Blue Bombers.

Flagel was announced as a member of the Canadian Football Hall of Fame 2025 class on June 12, 2025.
