= Bob Skemp =

Canadian football player (born 1963)

Profile
- Position: Right guard

Personal information
- Born: July 21, 1963 (age 63); La Crosse, Wisconsin, U.S.
- Listed height: 6 ft 2 in (1.88 m)
- Listed weight: 280 lb (127 kg)

Career information
- College: UBC
- CFL draft: 1986: 3rd round, 27th overall pick

Career history
- 1986: BC Lions
- 1987–1992: Toronto Argonauts

Awards and highlights
- Grey Cup champion (1991)

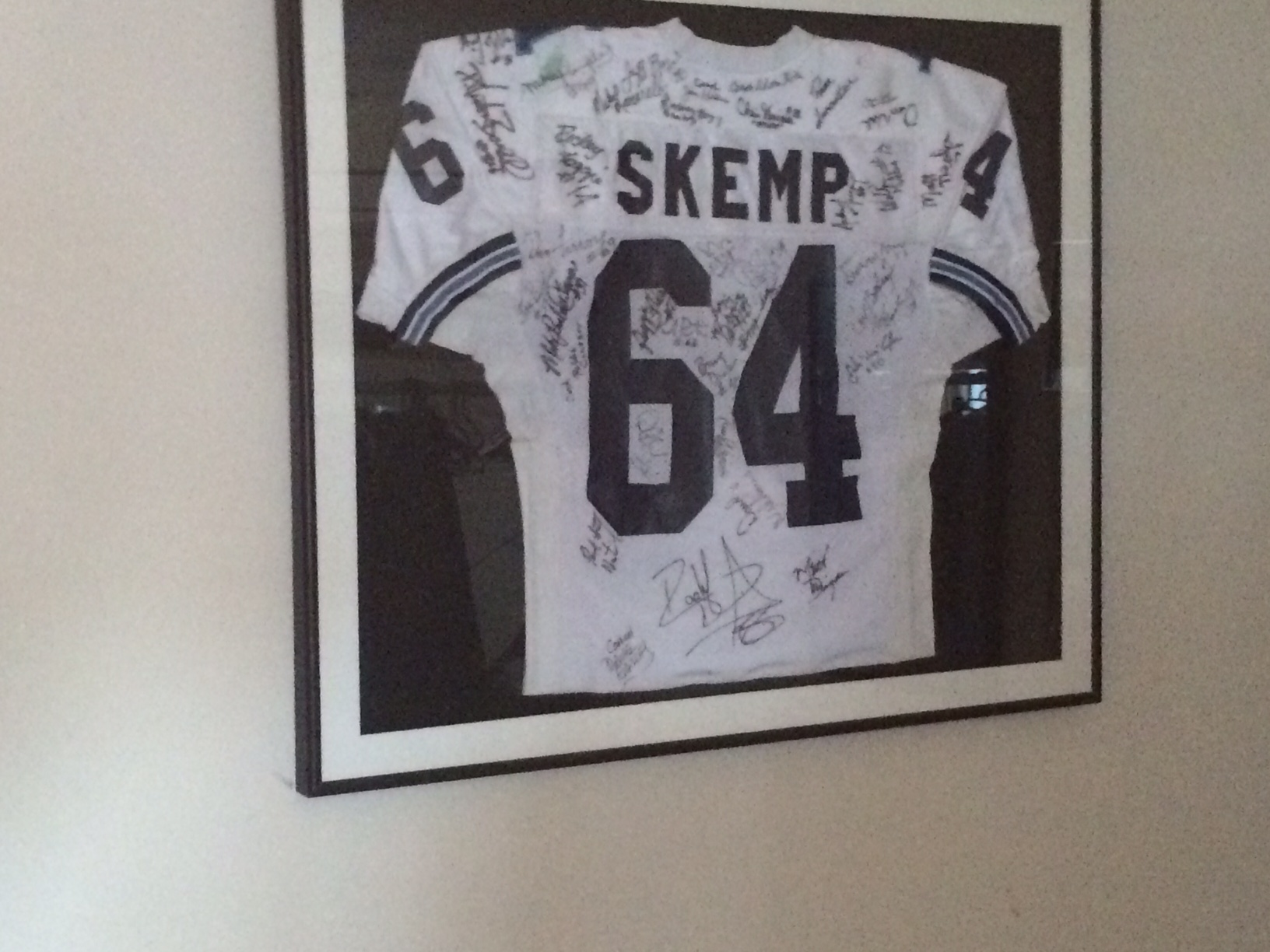
1991 Grey Cup Championship autographed jersey

Robert Skemp (born July 21, 1963) is a Canadian football player. Drafted in the third round, 27th overall, by the BC Lions, he played seven years in the CFL. He has been nominated as an honorable mention to the greatest CFL draft picks of all time

Growing up in Richmond, British Columbia Skemp, who still holds records in the CJFL, played his junior football with the Richmond Raiders, where his father Archie Skemp was head coach from 1984 - 1989. He later played with the UBC Thunderbirds.

During his first year in the CFL in 1986, Skemp was claimed as an unprotected player by the Montreal Alouettes as a non protected player. In 1987, during the equalization draft Bob was drafted by the Toronto Argonauts where he would continue to play for them until the 1992 season.

During the 1991 CFL year, Skemp was the starting right guard on the 1991 Grey Cup Toronto Argonauts football team.

On October 27, 2016, Skemp underwent spinal surgery. During surgery, his dural sac was nicked causing spinal fluid to leak. The surgery involved the replacement of two compressed discs in his neck at levels 5 and 6 of the spine. Once the dural sac was nicked, the procedure was stopped and only one disc (level 6) was replaced. Skemp's family established a crowd fundraising campaign to raise monies to pay for his medical needs.
