= Marco Cyncar =

Canadian football player (born 1958)

Profile
- Position: Wide receiver

Personal information
- Born: April 13, 1958 (age 68); Edmonton, Alberta, Canada
- Listed height: 6 ft 0 in (1.83 m)
- Listed weight: 187 lb (85 kg)

Career information
- University: Alberta
- CFL draft: 1979

Career history
- 1979: Edmonton Eskimos
- 1980: Hamilton Tiger-Cats
- 1981–1991: Edmonton Eskimos

Awards and highlights
- 4× Grey Cup champion (1979, 1981, 1982, 1987)

Career CFL statistics
- Receptions: 289
- Receiving yards: 4,345 (Avg: 15.0; TDs: 10; Lg: 58)
- Fumbles: 4
- Kickoff returns: 23 (Avg: 7.4; TDs: 0; Lg: 24)
- Punt returns: 26 (Avg: 6.1; TDs: 0; Lg: 18)

Marco Cyncar (born April 13, 1958) is a former Canadian Football League (CFL) wide receiver who played eleven seasons for the Edmonton Eskimos. He was a member of four Grey Cup Championship teams in Edmonton.

Cyncar played for the Edmonton Wildcats of the Canadian Junior Football League and also university football with the Alberta Golden Bears from 1976 to 1978. He was selected by the Eskimos in the 1979 CFL draft as a territorial exemption and won his first Grey Cup as a member of that year's squad.

An interesting deal in the 1980 CFL season saw the Eskimos "loan" Cyncar to the Hamilton Tiger-Cats for a single season (in which he played that season's Grey Cup game) after which he returned to the Eskimos for the 1981 CFL season. He completed his career in Edmonton gathering three more Grey Cup victories as part of the Eskimos dynasty of that period.
