= 1987 Hamilton Tiger-Cats season =

Season of Canadian Football League team the Hamilton Tiger-Cats

- Head coach: Al Bruno; Ted Schmitz
- Home stadium: Ivor Wynne Stadium

Results
- Record: 7–11
- Division place: 3rd, East
- Playoffs: Lost East Semi-Final
- Team MOP: Steve Stapler
- Team MOC: Rocky DiPietro
- Team MOR: Johnnie Jones

Uniform

The 1987 Hamilton Tiger-Cats season was the 30th season for the team in the Canadian Football League (CFL) and their 38th overall. The Tiger-Cats finished in third place in the East Division with a 7–11 record and lost the East Semi-Final to the Toronto Argonauts. Steve Stapler set a franchise record (broken in 1989) for most touchdowns in one season with 13.

== Preseason ==
Week	Date	Opponent	Result	Record
A	June 6	at Montreal Alouettes	W 14–13	1–0
C	June 16	vs. Toronto Argonauts	L 15–17	1–1

== Regular season ==
=== Season standings ===
East Division
Pos	Team	Pld	W	L	T	PF	PA	PD	Pts	Div	Stk
1	Winnipeg Blue Bombers (C, Q)	18	12	6	0	554	409	145	24	5–2	L1
2	Toronto Argonauts (Q)	18	11	6	1	484	427	57	23	6–4	W1
3	Hamilton Tiger-Cats (Q)	18	7	11	0	470	509	−39	14	4–5	L2
4	Ottawa Rough Riders	18	3	15	0	377	598	−221	6	2–6	L1

Source: "1987 Regular Season Standings". Archived from the original on 2009-10-16.
(C) First round bye; (Q) Qualified for playoffs

=== Season schedule ===
Week	Game	Date	Opponent	Result	Record
1	1	June 26	at Ottawa Rough Riders	L 32–36	0–1
2	2	July 5	vs. Edmonton Eskimos	L 33–36	0–2
3	3	July 12	at Edmonton Eskimos	W 40–30	1–2
4	4	July 17	vs. Toronto Argonauts	L 27–30	1–3
5	5	July 26	at Saskatchewan Roughriders	W 28–25	2–3
6	6	July 31	vs. BC Lions	W 21–20	3–3
7	Bye				
8	7	Aug 14	vs. Winnipeg Blue Bombers	W 26–14	4–3
9	8	Aug 21	at Toronto Argonauts	W 28–25	5–3
10	9	Aug 29	vs. Ottawa Rough Riders	W 28–23	6–3
11	10	Sept 7	vs. Toronto Argonauts	L 19–25	6–4
12	Bye				
13	11	Sept 20	at Toronto Argonauts	L 29–39	6–5
14	12	Sept 27	vs. Calgary Stampeders	L 17–33	6–6
15	13	Oct 4	at Winnipeg Blue Bombers	L 14–47	6–7
16	14	Oct 11	vs. Saskatchewan Roughriders	L 20–23	6–8
17	15	Oct 17	at BC Lions	L 11–25	6–9
18	16	Oct 24	at Ottawa Rough Riders	W 28–2	7–9
19	17	Nov 1	vs. Calgary Stampeders	L 33–34	7–10
20	18	Nov 6	at Calgary Stampeders	L 36–42	7–11

== Postseason ==
=== Schedule ===
Round	Date	Opponent	Result	Record
East Semi-Final	Nov 15	at Toronto Argonauts	L 13–29	0–1

== Awards and honours ==
- Harold Ballard was elected into the Canadian Football Hall of Fame as a Builder, May 2, 1987.
- Angelo Mosca was elected into the Canadian Football Hall of Fame as a player on, May 2, 1987. He played 15 CFL seasons, including nine times in the Grey Cup Game (emerging a winner five times). A CFL All-Star in 1963 and 1970, he was an Eastern All-Star Defensive Tackle five times.

=== 1987 CFL All-Stars ===
- DT – Mike Walker

== Roster ==
1987 Hamilton Tiger-Cats final roster
Quarterbacks: 4 Ken Hobart; 2 Mike Kerrigan; 8 Tom Porras; Running backs: 30 Dan Huclack; 18 Jeff Johnson; 24 Johnnie Jones; 21 Kenny King; 34 Greg Miller; Wide receivers: 87 Tony Champion; 85 Jacques Chapdelaine; 17 Wayne Lee; 80 Steve Stapler P; 1 Earl Winfield; Tight ends: 23 Rocky Dipietro; 74 Steve Jackson; 25 Lee Knight	Offensive linemen: 51 Pat Brady G; 68 Mike Derks C/T; 62 Lloyd Fairbanks T; 66 Miles Gorrell T; 62 John Malinosky G/T; 56 Jason Riley G; 56 Dale Sanderson C; 67 Ralph Scholz T; Defensive linemen: 77 Grover Covington DE; 69 Johnny Lewis DT; 79 Mark Napiorkowski DE; 88 Dale Sauve DE; 59 Rod Skillman DT; 61 Mike Walker DT; Special teams: 3 Paul Osbaldiston K/P	Linebackers: 72 Leo Ezerins; 39 Ed Gataveckas; 43 Frank Robinson; 33 Mike Robinson; 31 Ben Zambiasi; Defensive backs: 29 Alvin Bailey; 27 Paul Bennett; 15 Less Browne; 16 Howard Fields; 37 Terry Lehne; 6 Jim Rockford; 28 Lance Shields; 13 Keith Stanberry; 21 Jeff Treftlin; Injured List: 93 Romel Andrews DE; 20 Mark Streeter DB; 35 Jed Tommy RB; Italics indicate American players
