= Darnell Clash =

American gridiron football player (born 1962)

No. 1, 10
- Positions: Defensive back, RS

Personal information
- Born: June 18, 1962 (age 64); Cambridge, Maryland, U.S.
- Listed height: 5 ft 9 in (1.75 m)
- Listed weight: 170 lb (77 kg)

Career information
- College: Wyoming

Career history
- 1984–1987: BC Lions
- 1987: Toronto Argonauts

Awards and highlights
- Grey Cup champion (1985); CFL All-Star (1985); CFL East All-Star (1987); First-team All-WAC (1981)

Emory Darnell Clash (born June 18, 1962) is an American former professional football defensive back who played four seasons in the Canadian Football League (CFL) with the BC Lions and Toronto Argonauts. He played college football at the University of Wyoming.

== Early life and college ==
Emory Darnell Clash was born on June 18, 1962, in Cambridge, Maryland.

Clash played for the Wyoming Cowboys from 1980 to 1982. He set a school record for most career kick and punt returns with 153 and most combined kick and punt return yardage with 2,286. He earned All-Western Athletic Conference honors in 1981. Clash also recorded seven career interceptions.

== Professional career ==
Clash played in 39 games for the BC Lions from 1984 to 1987. He earned CFL All-Star honors in 1985. He played in sixteen games for the Toronto Argonauts during the 1987 season, garnering CFL East All-Star recognition.
