= James Ellingson =

Canadian football player (born 1963)

No. 85
- Position: Slotback

Personal information
- Born: May 18, 1963 (age 63); Calgary, Alberta, Canada
- Listed height: 6 ft 1 in (1.85 m)
- Listed weight: 205 lb (93 kg)

Career information
- College: British Columbia
- CFL draft: 1986: 2nd round, 11th overall pick

Career history
- 1986–1990: Saskatchewan Roughriders
- 1990–1996: Ottawa Rough Riders

Awards and highlights
- Grey Cup champion (1989)

James "Duke" Ellingson (born May 18, 1963) is a former Canadian Football League (CFL) slotback for the Saskatchewan Roughriders and the Ottawa Rough Riders from 1986 through 1996, including winning the 77th Grey Cup in 1989. During his career of 167 games, Ellingson recorded 255 catches for 3,502 yards and 19 touchdowns, with his best year being a 797 yard 9 touchdown campaign while with Ottawa in 1992.

Ellingson now co-hosts Pre/Post game Ottawa Redblacks Football coverage on TSN 1200.
