= Greg Stumon =

American gridiron football player (born 1963)

No. 45
- Positions: Defensive end, Linebacker

Personal information
- Born: May 26, 1963 (age 63); Plain Dealing, Louisiana, U.S.

Career information
- College: Southern Arkansas

Career history
- 1986–1988: BC Lions
- 1989: Edmonton Eskimos
- 1990–1992: Ottawa Rough Riders
- 1994–1995: Shreveport Pirates

Awards and highlights
- 3× CFL All-Star (1987, 1988, 1990); CFL East All-Star (1990); 2× CFL West All-Star (1987, 1988); CFL's Most Outstanding Defensive Player Award (1987)

Greg Stumon (born May 26, 1963) is a former award-winning defensive end and linebacker who played the Canadian Football League.

A native of Plain Dealing, Louisiana, he attended the Southern Arkansas University, and was inducted into that school's Sports Hall of Fame in 2003.

He began his CFL career with the BC Lions in 1986, playing until 1988. He won the CFL's Most Outstanding Defensive Player Award in 1987. He made the 1987 all-star team as a defensive end and the 1988 all-star team as an outside linebacker. After one season with the Edmonton Eskimos (1989) he moved on to the Ottawa Rough Riders (1990–92) where he made the 1990 all-star team as a defensive end. He later played with the expansion Shreveport Pirates for 1994 and 1995.

He trialled with the Dallas Cowboys in 1990 but was cut before the season started.
