= Lyle Bauer =

Canadian football player and executive (1958–2024)

No. 59
- Positions: Guard, Centre, CEO

Personal information
- Born: August 22, 1958; Saskatoon, Saskatchewan, Canada
- Died: April 27, 2024 (aged 65); Kelowna, British Columbia, Canada
- Listed height: 6 ft 3 in (1.91 m)
- Listed weight: 275 lb (125 kg)

Career information
- College: Weber State University
- CFL draft: 1979: 5th round, 38th overall pick

Career history

Playing
- 1982–1991: Winnipeg Blue Bombers

Operations
- 2000–2009: Winnipeg Blue Bombers
- 2010–2013: Calgary Stampeders

Awards and highlights
- 3× Grey Cup champion (1984, 1988, 1990); Blue Bombers Most Outstanding Lineman (1988); Blue Bomber Hall of Fame (1998)

Other information

Lyle Bauer (August 22, 1958 – April 27, 2024) was a Canadian professional football player and executive in the Canadian Football League (CFL). He played as an offensive lineman for the Winnipeg Blue Bombers from 1982 to 1991. After retiring he served in executive roles with the Blue Bombers and Calgary Stampeders.

Bauer played college football for the Weber State Wildcats before being drafted by the Saskatchewan Roughriders in 1979. He was ultimately cut from their roster and signed with the Winnipeg Blue Bombers in 1982, when he made his CFL debut. He was part of the franchise's Grey Cup-winning teams in 1984, 1988 and 1990. He retired after the 1991 season and subsequently worked as assistant general manager of the Blue Bombers from 1992 to 1995. After carrying on other business opportunities for five years, he returned to the Blue Bombers in 2000 as president and chief executive officer, playing a key role in steering the team out of financial trouble. He later served as president and chief operating officer of the Calgary Stampeders from 2010 to 2013. Outside of football, Bauer was noted for establishing the Never Alone Foundation to help individuals with cancer and their families, after surviving stage four throat cancer in 2004.

== Early life ==
Bauer was born in Saskatoon, Saskatchewan, on August 22, 1958. His father worked as a firefighter; his mother was a homemaker. He attended Mount Royal Collegiate in his hometown. He then studied business administration in the United States on an athletic scholarship at Weber State University in Ogden, Utah, where he played college football for the Wildcats as a guard and centre. Bauer was selected by the Saskatchewan Roughriders in the fifth round of the 1979 CFL draft. He subsequently signed with the team in mid-April of that same year.

== Playing career ==
During his brief stint with the Roughriders, Bauer was cut from their roster twice. He played for the Saskatchewan Huskies during the 1981 season in between those cuts, before signing with the Winnipeg Blue Bombers in March 1982 and making his debut with the franchise that season. In April 1984, he extended his contract with the Blue Bombers, who won the Grey Cup that year. Bauer's 1985 season was cut short due to torn knee ligaments, which he sustained in a 31–10 win against the BC Lions on October 11.

Bauer was named the Blue Bombers Most Outstanding Lineman in 1988, despite being part of the franchise's starting five tackles that conceded 67 sacks, the second worst in the league. Two years later, he was honoured as a division all-star. He was a member of the Blue Bombers Grey Cup-winning teams in 1988 and 1990. Bauer was inducted into the Blue Bomber Hall of Fame in 1998.

== Executive career ==
Upon retiring from professional football after the 1991 season, Bauer was appointed assistant general manager of the Blue Bombers. He held this role for three years before stepping down to pursue other business ventures, which led to him relocating to Calgary to become general manager of AgPro Grain. He was subsequently rehired by the Blue Bombers as president and chief executive officer in February 2000. At the time of his return, the team was languishing in financial debt of approximately C$5.45 million. Under Bauer's leadership, the Blue Bombers were able to initially reduce their debt to $300,000, before reportedly finishing with a positive balance of about C$5 million by the end of his tenure. He was also instrumental in securing hosting rights for Winnipeg in the 2006 Grey Cup. Bauer resigned his roles with the franchise on December 17, 2009. During his executive career, the Blue Bombers played in the Grey Cup four times (1992, 1993, 2001, and 2007).

In January 2010, the Calgary Stampeders announced that Bauer would be their new chief operating officer and president. He held these positions for three years before resigning in January 2013. He cited the change in team ownership as the reason for his departure, underscoring that it was not related to his health.

== Personal life ==
Bauer was married to Heidi for over four decades until his death. They met while studying at Weber State. Together, they had three children: Danni, Brodie, and Wesley. He resided close to Slocan Lake, British Columbia, during his later years, and maintained a winter home in St. George, Utah.

In December 2004, Bauer was diagnosed with stage four throat cancer, even though he never smoked or chewed tobacco. He underwent 28 sessions radiation treatments and chemotherapy until February of the following year, and continued to be present at CFL meetings despite being unable to speak. Although doctors had given Bauer only months to live, he eventually went into complete remission. He consequently established the Never Alone Foundation in 2006, in order to provide support to those affected by cancer as well as their families. By 2016, the charitable organization had raised over C$1 million towards numerous cancer programs. Bauer's battle with cancer also inspired his son Wesley to cycle across the country from Victoria, British Columbia, to Saint John, New Brunswick, over three months to raise awareness of cancer and money for the foundation.

Bauer died on April 27, 2024, in Kelowna. He was 65, and was hospitalized with an infection in the weeks prior to his death.
