= Alex Troop =

Canadian football player (born 1963)

Profile
- Position: Linebacker

Personal information
- Born: July 31, 1963 (age 63); Toronto, Ontario, Canada
- Listed height: 6 ft 2 in (1.88 m)
- Listed weight: 228 lb (103 kg)

Career information
- University: Wilfrid Laurier
- CFL draft: 1985: 6th round, 51st overall pick

Career history
- 1986–1988: Ottawa Rough Riders

Alex Troop (born July 31, 1963) is a retired Canadian football player who played for the Ottawa Rough Riders. He previously played at Wilfrid Laurier University.
