= Nelson Martin =

Canadian football player (born 1958)

Personal information
- Born: August 24, 1958 (age 68); Toronto, Ontario, Canada
- Listed height: 6 ft 0 in (1.83 m)
- Listed weight: 185 lb (84 kg)

Career information
- University: Simon Fraser; Seneca
- CFL draft: 1981: 1st round, 5th overall pick

Career history

Playing
- 1981–1987: BC Lions

Coaching
- 2003–2004: Ottawa Renegades (STC)
- 2007: Toronto Varsity Blues (DBC)
- 2009–2010: Saskatchewan Roughriders (DBC)
- 2011: Ottawa Gee-Gees (DBC)
- 2012: Hamilton Tiger-Cats (DBC)
- 2014: Winnipeg Blue Bombers (DBC)

Awards and highlights
- Grey Cup champion (1985); Dr. Beattie Martin Trophy (1987); CFL West All-Star (1987)

Nelson Martin (born August 24, 1958) is a Canadian former professional football defensive back in the Canadian Football League (CFL). He played for seven seasons with the BC Lions where he won the 73rd Grey Cup in 1985 and won the Dr. Beattie Martin Trophy as the West Division's most outstanding Canadian. He played college football for the Simon Fraser Clan. While at Simon Fraser, he broke his neck playing football and was warned by doctors that continuing to play could risk his life; he neglected these warnings before going on to star in the CFL. His best season was his final one, 1987, when he intercepted a career high 8 passes and was named a Western Division all star.

He is currently a mortgage agent for Trillium Mortgage Services in Toronto.
