= Dale Sanderson =

Canadian gridiron football player (born 1961)

No. 56
- Position: Centre

Personal information
- Born: December 12, 1961 (age 64); Hamilton, Ontario, Canada
- Listed height: 6 ft 3 in (1.91 m)
- Listed weight: 260 lb (118 kg)

Career information
- University: Tennessee
- CFL draft: 1985: 4th round, 36th overall pick

Career history
- 1985–1997: Hamilton Tiger-Cats

Awards and highlights
- Grey Cup champion (1986); CFL East All-Star (1989)

Dale Sanderson (born December 12, 1961) is a Canadian former professional football offensive lineman who played 13 seasons for the Hamilton Tiger-Cats. The Tiger-Cats selected him in the fourth round of the 1985 CFL draft with the 36th overall pick. He played college football at the University of Tennessee.
