= Nick Benjamin =

Canadian football player (1961–2007)

Profile
- Position: Guard

Personal information
- Born: May 29, 1961; Trinidad and Tobago
- Died: August 20, 2007 (aged 46); Winnipeg, Manitoba, Canada

Career information
- College: Concordia University
- CFL draft: 1985: 1st round, 1st overall pick

Career history
- 1985–1989: Ottawa Rough Riders
- 1989–1993: Winnipeg Blue Bombers
- 1994: Ottawa Rough Riders

Awards and highlights
- Grey Cup champion (1990); Frank M. Gibson Trophy (1985)

Nicholas Dexter Benjamin (May 29, 1961 – August 20, 2007) was a professional football player. Benjamin was an offensive lineman with the Ottawa Rough Riders and Winnipeg Blue Bombers from 1985 to 1993.

== College career ==
Nick Benjamin played for Concordia Stingers of Concordia University in Montreal, Quebec. He was twice named an All-Canadian and conference all-star. After his career he was inducted into the Concordia University Sports Hall of Fame.

== CFL career ==
Benjamin played with the Ottawa Rough Riders from 1985 to 1989 before joining the Winnipeg Blue Bombers in 1989. He retired after completing the 1993 season.

== Personal life ==
After his football career, he remained active in the Winnipeg community.

== Death ==
He was diagnosed with kidney disease. The disease eventually took his life in 2007 at the age of 46.
