= Marina High School (San Leandro, California) =

Location
- 15225 Wicks Blvd. San Leandro, California; United States
- Coordinates: 37.688354°N 122.162376°W

Information
- Type: Public
- Opened: 1964
- Closed: 1982
- School district: San Lorenzo Unified School District
- Principal: Forrest S. Lindsay (1964-1973); Roosevelt Bergmann (1974-1982)
- Grades: Freshman, Sophomore, Junior, Senior, 8th Graders came to Marina beginning in the 1979-80 school year
- Enrollment: 1200
- Colors: Royal blue, white, and red
- Team name: Titans
- Newspaper: The Thunderbolt
- Yearbook: The Timaran

Marina High School was a public high school located in the Washington Manor neighborhood of San Leandro, California, USA, that opened from 1964 to 1982. It was part of the San Lorenzo Unified School District.

It opened in September 1964 on Wicks Boulevard with only freshman, sophomore and junior classes. Donald Hayes was the architect of Marina High, which gave Marina its distinctive roofline. The students mostly came from the former Foothill High School in Hayward. The first graduating class at Marina was in 1966 and the last graduating class was in 1982. Marina mainly served the Washington Manor area of San Leandro, and approximately 1,200 students attended each year of its existence. Forrest S. Lindsay was the first principal from 1964 to 1973, and Roosevelt Bergmann was its second principal from 1974 to 1982.

Marina's athletic teams were known as The Titans, and the school colors were royal blue, white, and red. The Titans competed in the Hayward Area Athletic League (HAAL) in American football, baseball, basketball (the Titans had their first winning season in 1969-70), golf, badminton, gymnastics, soccer, softball, swimming, tennis, cross country, track, wrestling, G.A.A. baseball and G.A.A. basketball. The Titans Varsity Football team won the HAAL championship in 1974 and played Dublin High in the Turkey Bowl at Chabot College in Hayward. The Titans won that game 30-8. They were ranked 7th in Bay Area polls after the season. In Marina's final year open, Titans Varsity Softball team won the California Interscholastic Federation (CIF) championship in 1982, making them the last sports team to win a title for the school.

Clubs at Marina High School included Block "M" (boys' sports), G.A.A. (girls' sports), Megaphone Club (spirit club for the school), French Club, California Scholarship Federation, Latin Club, Future Business Leaders of America, the Virons, Rally Committee, Chess Club, Music Club, JV and Varsity Cheerleaders and Songgirls, Executive Council, Student Court Justices, Representative Assembly, Student Curriculum Council, Homemaking, Art Club, the Thunderbolt Staff (newspaper), and Timaran Staff (yearbook).

In 1982, the property was sold by the San Lorenzo Unified School District to the City of San Leandro, California. The school was subsequently demolished to make way for single-family, detached homes, but the Marina High School multi-purpose room, two art rooms and the cafeteria were saved and renamed The Marina Community Center, located at 15301 Wicks Boulevard. The City of San Leandro Library holds copies of Marina High School's yearbooks.

== Notable alumni ==
- Rick Kukulika, NFL football player for Miami Dolphins
- Dennis Netto, Radio's first ever "shock jock" DJ, he went by the name Dennis Erectus and had daily shows on KOME & KSJO Radio Stations
- Jimmy Lyon, musician
- Carl Potts, cartoonist and art editor of Marvel Comics
- Dave Albright, American football player
- Doug Padilla, long distance runner, 1984 & 1988 Summer Olympics
