= Walter Bender (Canadian football) =

American gridiron football player (born 1961)

No. 24, 34, 33, 25
- Position: Running back

Personal information
- Born: September 8, 1961 (age 65); Detroit, Michigan, U.S.
- Listed height: 5 ft 11 in (1.80 m)
- Listed weight: 195 lb (88 kg)

Career information
- High school: Northwestern (Detroit)
- College: Kent State
- NFL draft: 1984: undrafted

Career history
- 1984–1985: Toronto Argonauts
- 1986: Hamilton Tiger-Cats
- 1987: Saskatchewan Roughriders
- 1988: Winnipeg Blue Bombers
- 1989: Ottawa Rough Riders*
- * Offseason or practice squad member only

Awards and highlights
- 2× Grey Cup champion (1986, 1988); CFL East All-Star (1986)

Walter L. Bender (born September 8, 1961) is an American former professional football running back who played five seasons in the Canadian Football League (CFL) with the Toronto Argonauts, Hamilton Tiger-Cats, Saskatchewan Roughriders and Winnipeg Blue Bombers. He played college football at Tabor College and Kent State University.

== Early life and college ==
Walter L. Bender was born on September 8, 1961, in Detroit, Michigan. He attended Northwestern High School in Detroit.

Bender first played college football at Tabor College from 1980 to 1982. He transferred to Kent State University for the 1983 season.

== Professional career ==
Bender was signed by the Toronto Argonauts in 1984 and played for the team from 1984 to 1985. He was released by the team on June 21, 1986.

Bender signed with the Hamilton Tiger-Cats and played for them during the 1986 season, winning the 74th Grey Cup. He also earned CFL East All-Star honors after recording 618 yards on 8 rushing touchdowns in twelve games.

Bender played for the Saskatchewan Roughriders in 1987.

Bender played for the Winnipeg Blue Bombers in 1988, winning the 76th Grey Cup.

Bender signed with the Ottawa Rough Riders in 1989 but was released.
