= Brian Belway =

Canadian gridiron football player (born 1963)

Brian P. Belway (born May 28, 1963 in Ottawa, Ontario) is a former National Football League (NFL) defensive end.

Belway played one game for the Los Angeles Raiders in the 1987 season. He chose to cross the picket lines and play as a non union player during the NFL players strike while most of the union players (legitimate NFLers) chose not to play at that time.

Belway was drafted in the first round, seventh overall, by the Winnipeg Blue Bombers in 1986. Released by the Bombers, he was signed by the Calgary Stampeders in July 1986. Calgary released Belway in June 1987. After his stint with the Raiders, Belway was signed by the Saskatchewan Roughriders in February 1988. After being released, he signed with the BC Lions in July. He was signed by the Edmonton Eskimos.
