= James West (Canadian football) =

American gridiron football player (born 1955)

No. 58
- Position: Linebacker

Personal information
- Born: December 19, 1955 (age 70); Fort Worth, Texas, U.S.
- Listed weight: 230 lb (104 kg)

Career information
- College: Texas Southern

Career history
- 1982–1984: Calgary Stampeders
- 1985–1992: Winnipeg Blue Bombers
- 1993: BC Lions

Awards and highlights
- 2× Grey Cup champion (1988, 1990); James P. McCaffrey Trophy (1987); 2× CFL All-Star (1987, 1989); 2× CFL East All-Star (1987, 1989); Coaches All CFL-Team (1985)
- Canadian Football Hall of Fame (Class of 2016)

James West (born December 19, 1955) is a former linebacker who played twelve seasons in the Canadian Football League (CFL) for three teams. He won two Grey Cups for the Winnipeg Blue Bombers. Nicknamed Wild West, he played college football at Texas Southern University and trialled with the St. Louis Cardinals in 1984, before joining the Bombers during the 1985 season.

In 2016, he was inducted into the Canadian Football Hall of Fame.
