= Milson Jones =

Jamaican gridiron football player (born 1959)

No. 32, 34
- Position: Fullback

Personal information
- Born: August 14, 1959 (age 67); Linstead, Jamaica
- Listed height: 6 ft 0 in (1.83 m)
- Listed weight: 210 lb (95 kg)

Career information
- College: University of North Dakota

Career history
- 1982–83: Winnipeg Blue Bombers
- 1984–87: Edmonton Eskimos
- 1988–92: Saskatchewan Roughriders

Awards and highlights
- 2× Grey Cup champion (1987, 1989); Dick Suderman Trophy (1987)

Milson Jones (born August 14, 1959) is a former award winning and Grey Cup champion fullback in the Canadian Football League (CFL).

Born in Jamaica, Jones was a stand-out player at the University of North Dakota. He played at UND from 1979 to 1981 and was an All-American in 1980 and 1981. He joined the Winnipeg Blue Bombers in 1982. In 1984, he moved to the Edmonton Eskimos, where in 1987 he won the Grey Cup in a classic game, being named the Dick Suderman Trophy winner. His next stop was the Saskatchewan Roughriders in 1988, where he had his two best seasons, rushing for 730 yards in 1988 and 765 yards in 1990. He also won another Grey Cup, again a classic game in 1989. In 11 seasons he rushed for 4,930 yards and caught 359 passes for 3,873 yards.

Both Milson's sons (Devon and Tristan) became Canadian university football stars.
