= Bobby Jurasin =

American gridiron football player (born 1964)

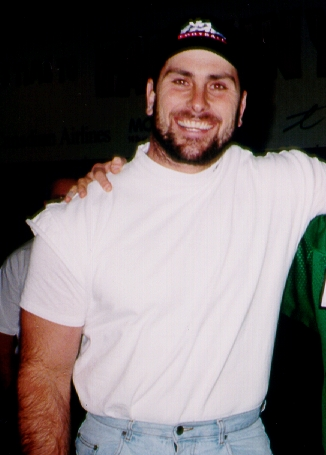

No. 71
- Position: Defensive end

Personal information
- Born: August 26, 1964 (age 62); Wakefield, Michigan, U.S.

Career information
- College: Northern Michigan

Career history
- 1986–1997: Saskatchewan Roughriders
- 1998: Toronto Argonauts
- 1999: Iowa Barnstormers

Awards and highlights
- Grey Cup champion (1989); 4× CFL All-Star (1987, 1988, 1992, 1997); 6× CFL West All-Star (1987, 1988, 1989, 1992, 1994, 1997)
- Canadian Football Hall of Fame (Class of 2006)

Bobby Jurasin souvenir bobblehead, included as a promotion with Corby Distilleries products sold in Saskatchewan during 2008.

Robert Jurasin (born August 26, 1964) is a former defensive lineman for the Saskatchewan Roughriders from 1986 to 1997 and the Toronto Argonauts in 1998. He was a CFL All-Star in 1987, 1988, 1992 and 1997. He was a part of the Roughriders 1989 Grey Cup winning team. He also won the Molson Cup Most Popular Player in 1987 and 1997.

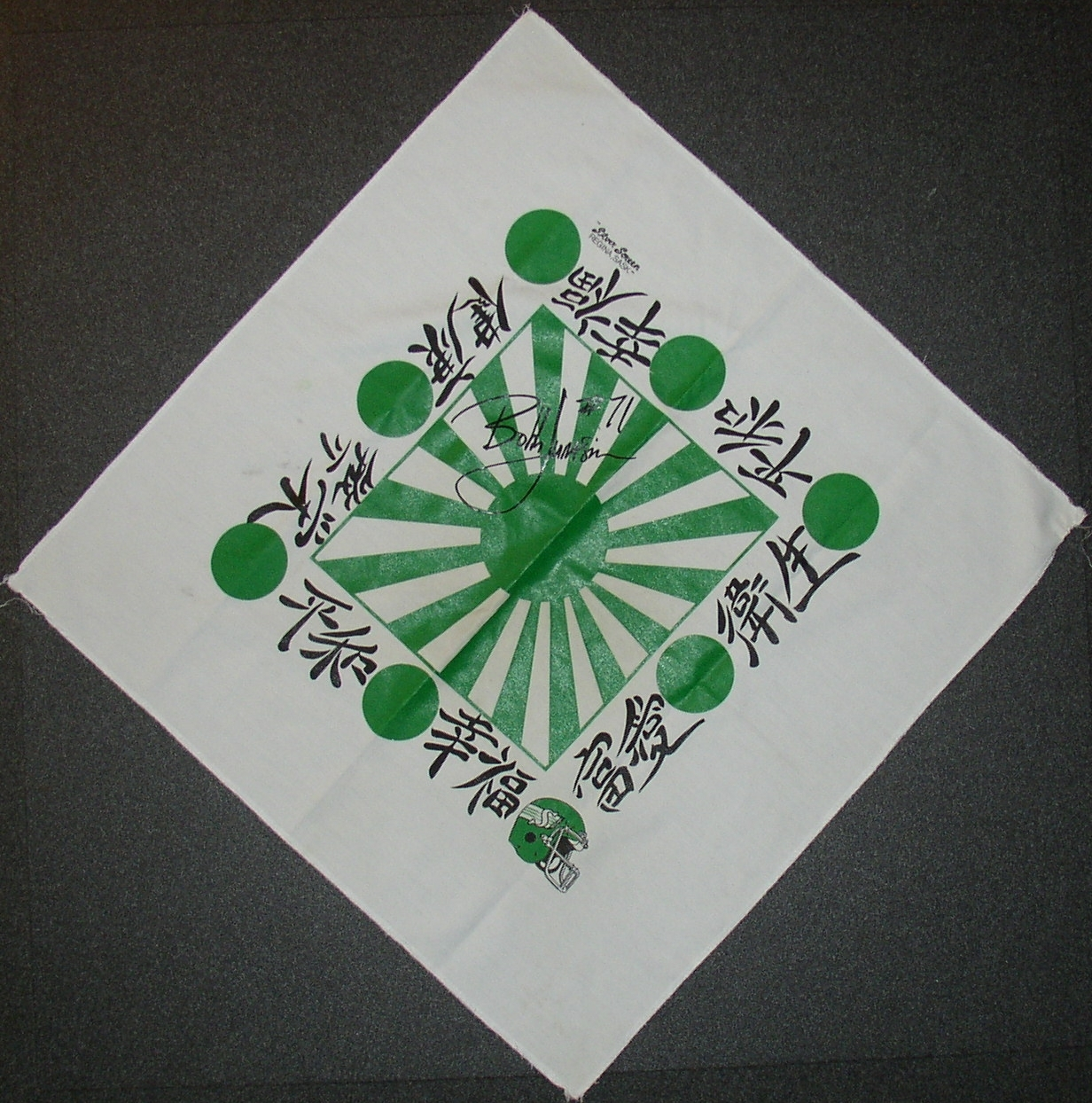
The Saskatchewan Roughriders' green and white souvenir Rising Sun bandana.

Jurasin is the Roughriders all-time leader in quarterback sacks with 142.

Jurasin also played in the Arena Football League with the Iowa Barnstormers. A neck injury in the AFL forced Jurasin into retirement.

After retiring as a player, he was a defensive line and strength conditioning coach at Northern Michigan University for six years and has been a guest coach at the University of Saskatchewan in Saskatoon.

He was honoured by being inducted in the Northern Michigan University Hall of Fame in 1998 and the U.P. Sports Hall of Fame in 2005. Jurasin was inducted into the Canadian Football Hall of Fame in 2006.

One of Jurasin's prominent accessories is the red-and-black Rising Sun bandana which he consistently wore under his helmet. CFL merchandise also offers a green-and-white version of the bandana.
