= 1987 CFL season =

Canadian Football League season

- Duration: June 21 – November 8, 1987
- East champions: Toronto Argonauts
- West champions: Edmonton Eskimos

75th Grey Cup
- Date: November 29, 1987
- Venue: BC Place, Vancouver
- Champions: Edmonton Eskimos

CFL seasons
- ← 1986 1988 →

Canadian Football League team locations: West, East

The 1987 CFL season is considered to be the 34th season in modern-day Canadian football, although it is officially the 30th Canadian Football League season.

== CFL news in 1987 ==
The Canadian Football League celebrated the 75th Annual Grey Cup game at BC Place Stadium on Sunday, November 29.

The Canadian Football Network, which was syndicated on Canadian television stations, was created by the league, taking the place of CTV, which ended its partnership with the CFL the previous season. The CFL experimented with their blackout policy by blacking out four televised games in both, Hamilton and Toronto (two in Hamilton and two in Toronto). The cable outlet TSN also began broadcasting the CFL in 1987, gaining the rights to games that had been passed on by CBC and CFN; TSN has aired CFL games ever since, eventually becoming the exclusive broadcaster in 2008. The CFL made money off the CBC and TSN agreements, money that largely covered the startup costs for CFN for the first year.

Game rosters were revised from 35 to 34 that included 19 Non-Imports, 13 Imports and 2 Quarterbacks. The reserve list was increased from three to four. Even with these reductions, all eight remaining CFL teams lost money.

After losing money for three years, Charles Bronfman sold the Concordes to Norm Kimball, who renamed them the Alouettes the previous year to renew interest in the team, but after losing money during the 1986 season, and playing before sparse Olympic Stadium crowds of less than 10,000, he, along with the CFL folded the Montreal Alouettes for the second time, this time for good on June 24 (the first week of the regular season), after the team played two preseason games on the road. With the team's demise the CFL (reduced to eight teams) revised the season schedule and moved the Winnipeg Blue Bombers to the East Division to balance out the divisions. The Alouettes, however, would return in 1996 when the CFL's American operations ended with the Baltimore Stallions moving to Montreal to become the third and current incarnation of the team.

In January 1987, the league rejected a proposal from Arizona Outlaws owner Bill Tatham to allow the Outlaws, then without a league after the collapse of the United States Football League, to play in the CFL.

The single-elimination Semi-Final/Final playoff format (in use since 1972) that was scrapped last season in favour of the "total point series" format was restored; the crossover playoff format was not revisited until 1997.

=== 1987 CFL dispersal draft ===
After the Alouettes folded just prior to the 1987 season - folding after the league's season opener, but before their first game - a dispersal draft was held among the remaining 8 teams. The draft took place on 26 June 1987, and 23 players were selected.

Round one

Pick #	Player	Position	Team
1	James Hood	WR	Ottawa Rough Riders
2	Brett Williams	DL	Saskatchewan Roughriders
3	Matt FInlay	LB	Toronto Argonauts
4	Rick Ryan	DB	Calgary Stampeders
5	Nick Arakgi	TE	Winnipeg Blue Bombers
6	Glenn Kulka	DL	British Columbia Lions
7	Steve Benjamin	DB	Edmonton Eskimos
8	Jacques Chapdelaine	WR	Hamilton Tiger Cats

Round two

Pick #	Player	Position	Team
9	Larry Mohr	RB	Ottawa Rough Riders
10	Dave Ridgway	K	Saskatchewan Roughriders
11	Bob Skemp	OL	Toronto Argonauts
12	Mike Palumbo	OL	Calgary Stampeders
13	Jeff Treftlin	DB	Winnipeg Blue Bombers
14	Dan Rashovich	LB	British Columbia Lions
15	William Mitchell	LB	Edmonton Eskimos
16	Lloyd Fairbanks	OL	Hamilton Tiger Cats

Round three

Pick #	Player	Position	Team
17	Doug Scott	DL	Ottawa Rough Riders
18	Brad Taylor	QB	Saskatchewan Roughriders
19	Calvin Taylor	DL	Toronto Argonauts
20	Pass		Calgary Stampeders
21	Don Wilson	DB	Winnipeg Blue Bombers
22	Pass		British Columbia Lions
23	Pass		Edmonton Eskimos
24	Sean McKeown	OL	Hamilton Tiger Cats

Round four

Pick #	Player	Position	Team
25	Pass		Ottawa Rough Riders
26	Jerry Gordon	WR	Saskatchewan Roughriders
27	Pass		Toronto Argonauts
28	Pass		Calgary Stampeders
29	Eric Emery	LB	Winnipeg Blue Bombers
30	Pass		British Columbia Lions
31	Pass		Edmonton Eskimos
32	Pass		Hamilton Tiger Cats

== Regular season standings ==
=== Final regular season standings ===
West Division
Pos	Team	Pld	W	L	T	PF	PA	PD	Pts	Div	Stk
1	BC Lions (C, Q)	18	12	6	0	502	370	132	24	6–3	W4
2	Edmonton Eskimos (Q)	18	11	7	0	617	462	155	22	5–4	W1
3	Calgary Stampeders (Q)	18	10	8	0	453	517	−64	20	5–3	L2
4	Saskatchewan Roughriders	18	5	12	1	364	529	−165	11	2–7	L3

Source: "CFL.ca". Archived from the original on October 16, 2009.
(C) First round bye; (Q) Qualified for playoffs

East Division
Pos	Team	Pld	W	L	T	PF	PA	PD	Pts	Div	Stk
1	Winnipeg Blue Bombers (C, Q)	18	12	6	0	554	409	145	24	5–2	L1
2	Toronto Argonauts (Q)	18	11	6	1	484	427	57	23	6–4	W1
3	Hamilton Tiger-Cats (Q)	18	7	11	0	470	509	−39	14	4–5	L2
4	Ottawa Rough Riders	18	3	15	0	377	598	−221	6	2–6	L1

Source: "1987 Regular Season Standings". Archived from the original on October 16, 2009.
(C) First round bye; (Q) Qualified for playoffs

BC and Winnipeg have first round byes.

== Grey Cup playoffs ==
The Edmonton Eskimos are the 1987 Grey Cup champions, defeating the Toronto Argonauts 38–36, at Vancouver's BC Place Stadium. This game eventually became the battle of the backups when starters, Matt Dunigan and Gilbert Renfroe became injured leaving backups Damon Allen and Danny Barrett to take over. The Eskimos' Damon Allen (QB) was named the Grey Cup's Most Valuable Player on Offence and Stewart Hill (DE) was named Grey Cup's Most Valuable Player on Defence, while Milson Jones (RB) was named the Grey Cup's Most Valuable Canadian.

=== Playoff bracket ===
November 15: Division Semifinals
East
E3	Hamilton Tiger-Cats	13
E2	Toronto Argonauts	29
West
W3	Calgary Stampeders	16
W2	Edmonton Eskimos	30

November 22: Division Finals
E2	Toronto Argonauts	19
E1	Winnipeg Blue Bombers	3
W2	Edmonton Eskimos	31
W1	BC Lions	7

November 29: 75th Grey Cup @ BC Place Stadium – Vancouver, BC
E2	Toronto Argonauts	36
W2	Edmonton Eskimos	38

== CFL leaders ==
- CFL passing leaders
- CFL rushing leaders
- CFL receiving leaders

== 1987 CFL All-Stars ==
=== Offence ===
- QB – Tom Clements, Winnipeg Blue Bombers
- RB – Willard Reaves, Winnipeg Blue Bombers
- RB – Gill Fenerty, Toronto Argonauts
- SB – Darrell Smith, Toronto Argonauts
- SB – Perry Tuttle, Winnipeg Blue Bombers
- WR – Brian Kelly, Edmonton Eskimos
- WR – Jim Sandusky, BC Lions
- C – Rod Connop, Edmonton Eskimos
- OG – Roger Aldag, Saskatchewan Roughriders
- OG – Dan Ferrone, Toronto Argonauts
- OT – Chris Walby, Winnipeg Blue Bombers
- OT – Chris Schultz, Toronto Argonauts

=== Defence ===
- DT – Mike Walker, Hamilton Tiger-Cats
- DT – Jerald Baylis, Toronto Argonauts
- DE – Greg Stumon, BC Lions
- DE – Bobby Jurasin, Saskatchewan Roughriders
- LB – James West, Winnipeg Blue Bombers
- LB – Tyrone Jones, Winnipeg Blue Bombers
- LB – Kevin Konar, BC Lions
- CB – Roy Bennett, Winnipeg Blue Bombers
- CB – James Jefferson, Winnipeg Blue Bombers
- DB – Larry Crawford, BC Lions
- DB – Ken Hailey, Winnipeg Blue Bombers
- S – Scott Flagel, Winnipeg Blue Bombers

=== Special teams ===
- P – Hank Ilesic, Toronto Argonauts
- K – Dave Ridgway, Saskatchewan Roughriders
- ST – Henry "Gizmo" Williams, Edmonton Eskimos

== 1987 Eastern All-Stars ==
=== Offence ===
- QB – Tom Clements, Winnipeg Blue Bombers
- RB – Willard Reaves, Winnipeg Blue Bombers
- RB – Gill Fenerty, Toronto Argonauts
- SB – Darrell Smith, Toronto Argonauts
- SB – Perry Tuttle, Winnipeg Blue Bombers
- WR – James Murphy, Winnipeg Blue Bombers
- WR – Steve Stapler, Hamilton Tiger-Cats
- C – Ian Beckstead, Toronto Argonauts
- OG – Nick Bastaja, Winnipeg Blue Bombers
- OG – Dan Ferrone, Toronto Argonauts
- OT – Chris Walby, Winnipeg Blue Bombers
- OT – Chris Schultz, Toronto Argonauts

=== Defence ===
- DT – Mike Walker, Hamilton Tiger-Cats
- DT – Jearld Baylis, Toronto Argonauts
- DE – Grover Covington, Hamilton Tiger-Cats
- DE – Rodney Harding, Toronto Argonauts
- LB – James West, Winnipeg Blue Bombers
- LB – Tyrone Jones, Winnipeg Blue Bombers
- LB – Frank Robinson, Hamilton Tiger-Cats
- CB – Roy Bennett, Winnipeg Blue Bombers
- CB – James Jefferson, Winnipeg Blue Bombers
- DB – Howard Fields, Hamilton Tiger-Cats
- DB – Ken Hailey, Winnipeg Blue Bombers
- S – Scott Flagel, Winnipeg Blue Bombers

=== Special teams ===
- P – Hank Ilesic, Toronto Argonauts
- K – Dean Dorsey, Ottawa Rough Riders
- ST – Darnell Clash, Toronto Argonauts

== 1987 Western All-Stars ==
=== Offence ===
- QB – Roy Dewalt, BC Lions
- RB – Gary Allen, Calgary Stampeders
- RB – Walter Bender (Canadian football), Saskatchewan Roughriders
- SB – Ray Elgaard, Saskatchewan Roughriders
- SB – Emanuel Tolbert, Calgary Stampeders
- WR – Brian Kelly, Edmonton Eskimos
- WR – Jim Sandusky, BC Lions
- C – Rod Connop, Edmonton Eskimos
- OG – Roger Aldag, Saskatchewan Roughriders
- OG – Gerald Roper, BC Lions
- OT – John Blain, BC Lions
- OT – Hec Pothier, Edmonton Eskimos

=== Defence ===
- DT – James Curry, Saskatchewan Roughriders
- DT – Harold Hallman, Calgary Stampeders
- DE – Greg Stumon, BC Lions
- DE – Bobby Jurasin, Saskatchewan Roughriders
- LB – Dan Bass, Edmonton Eskimos
- LB – Glen Jackson, BC Lions
- LB – Kevin Konar, BC Lions
- CB – Keith Gooch, BC Lions
- CB – Harry Skipper, Saskatchewan Roughriders
- DB – Larry Crawford, BC Lions
- DB – Melvin Byrd, BC Lions
- S – Nelson Martin, BC Lions

=== Special teams ===
- P – Glenn Harper, Calgary Stampeders
- K – Dave Ridgway, Saskatchewan Roughriders
- ST – Henry "Gizmo" Williams, Edmonton Eskimos

== 1987 CFL awards ==
- CFL's Most Outstanding Player Award – Tom Clements (QB), Winnipeg Blue Bombers
- CFL's Most Outstanding Canadian Award – Scott Flagel (DS), Winnipeg Blue Bombers
- CFL's Most Outstanding Defensive Player Award – Greg Stumon (DE), BC Lions
- CFL's Most Outstanding Offensive Lineman Award – Chris Walby (OT), Winnipeg Blue Bombers
- CFL's Most Outstanding Rookie Award – Gill Fenerty (RB), Toronto Argonauts
- CFLPA's Outstanding Community Service Award – Nick Arakgi (DE), Winnipeg Blue Bombers
- CFL's Coach of the Year – Bob O'Billovich, Toronto Argonauts
