= Steve Stapler =

American gridiron football player (born 1958)

Profile
- Position: Wide receiver

Personal information
- Born: June 28, 1958 (age 68); Los Angeles, California, U.S.

Career information
- College: San Diego State

Career history
- 1980: Toronto Argonauts
- 1981–1988: Hamilton Tiger-Cats

Awards and highlights
- Grey Cup champion (1986)

Career statistics
- Receptions: 353
- Receiving yards: 5,848
- Touchdowns: 40

Steve Stapler (born June 28, 1958) is an American former professional football wide receiver in the Canadian Football League (CFL). He played for the Toronto Argonauts and Hamilton Tiger-Cats, appearing in the Grey Cup final with the Ti-Cats in 1984, 1985, and winning in 1986. Stapler played college football at San Diego State.
