= James Jefferson (gridiron football) =

American football player (born 1963)

No. 26, 20
- Position: Cornerback

Personal information
- Born: November 18, 1963 (age 62); Portsmouth, Virginia, U.S.
- Listed height: 6 ft 1 in (1.85 m)
- Listed weight: 199 lb (90 kg)

Career information
- High school: Henrietta M. King (Kingsville, Texas)
- College: Texas A&I

Career history
- Winnipeg Blue Bombers (1986–1988); Seattle Seahawks (1989–1993); BC Lions (1994–1995); Winnipeg Blue Bombers (1995)

Awards and highlights
- 2× Grey Cup champion (1988, 1994)

Career statistics
- Interceptions: 2
- Sacks: 1
- Stats at Pro Football Reference

Career CFL statistics
- Interceptions: 17
- Touchdowns: 2

James Andrew Jefferson III (born November 18, 1963) is an American former professional football player who was a defensive back in the National Football League (NFL) and Canadian Football League (CFL). He played for the Seattle Seahawks of the NFL and the Winnipeg Blue Bombers and BC Lions of the CFL, and also won two Grey Cup championships, one with the Blue Bombers in 1988 and another with the Lions in 1994. Jefferson played college football for the Texas A&M–Kingsville Javelinas.
