= Kevin Konar =

Canadian football player (born 1958)

No. 31
- Position: Linebacker

Personal information
- Born: July 8, 1958 (age 68); Vancouver, British Columbia, Canada

Career information
- University: British Columbia
- CFL draft: 1980: 1st round, 5th overall pick

Career history
- 1980–1989: BC Lions

Awards and highlights
- Grey Cup champion (1985); 2× CFL All-Star (1985, 1987); Western All Star (2x); All Canadian-UBC

Kevin Konar (born July 8, 1958) is a Canadian former professional football linebacker for the BC Lions of the Canadian Football League (CFL).

After playing his university football with the University of British Columbia, Konar played play 10 years with the Lions, from 1980 to 1989, and three Grey Cups (1983, 1985 and 1988) and one championship (in 1985). He was inducted into the BC Lions Wall of Fame in 2008. He was a CFL All Star two times.

He currently works as an Investment Advisor at RBC. His son, Adam Konar, also plays in the CFL.
