= Larry Mohr =

Canadian football player (born 1961)

Profile
- Position: Running back

Personal information
- Born: May 5, 1961 (age 65); New Hamburg, Ontario, Canada
- Listed height: 6 ft 0 in (1.83 m)
- Listed weight: 212 lb (96 kg)

Career information
- University: Queen's

Career history
- 1986: Edmonton Eskimos
- 1987–1988: Ottawa Rough Riders

Awards and highlights
- Hec Crighton Trophy (1985)

Larry Mohr (born May 5, 1961) is a Canadian former professional football running back who played three seasons in Canadian Football League (CFL) for the Edmonton Eskimos and Ottawa Rough Riders. He played CIAU football at Queen's, winning the Hec Crighton Trophy in 1985.
