= Harry Skipper =

American gridiron football player (born 1960)

No. 26
- Position: Defensive back

Personal information
- Born: April 2, 1960 (age 66); Baxley, Georgia, U.S.

Career information
- College: South Carolina

Career history
- 1983–1985: Montreal Concordes
- 1986–1989: Saskatchewan Roughriders

Awards and highlights
- Grey Cup champion (1989); James P. McCaffrey Trophy (1984); 2× CFL All-Star (1983, 1984)

Harry Skipper (born April 2, 1960) is an American former football player in the Canadian Football League (CFL) for seven years. Skipper played defensive back for the Montreal Concordes and Saskatchewan Roughriders from 1983–1989. He played college football at the University of South Carolina. He now coaches football and track for Thomas County Central High, he also coached wrestling helping four students place 3rd, 4th, 5th, and 6th respectively in state in a 3-year span which is unheard of for this small town school.
