= 1986 BC Lions season =

Canadian football team season

- General manager: Joe Galat
- Head coach: Don Matthews
- Home stadium: BC Place Stadium

Results
- Record: 12–6
- Division place: 2nd, West
- Playoffs: Lost West Final

The 1986 BC Lions finished in second place in the West Division with a 12–6 record. They appeared in the West Final.

== Offseason ==
=== CFL draft ===
Round	Pick	Player	Position	School
1	9	Paul Nastasiuk	RB	Wilfrid Laurier
2	18	Mark Turner	DL	Miami (OH)
3	25	Ron Crick	LB	Idaho State
3	27	Bob Skemp	C	British Columbia, Richmond Raiders
4	36	Scott Lecky	WR	Guelph
5	45	Peter Jeffrey	T	Simon Fraser
6	54	Floyd Mingo	DB	Simon Fraser
7	63	Paul Osbaldiston	K/P	Western Montana
8	72	Steve Bernstein	DB	Simon Fraser

== Preseason ==
Game	Date	Opponent	Results		Venue	Attendance
Game	Date	Opponent	Score	Record	Venue	Attendance
A	Sat, June 7	at Saskatchewan Roughriders	W 41–21	1–0	Taylor Field	14,704
B	Tue, June 17	vs. Calgary Stampeders	L 20–41	1–1	BC Place	33,537
C	Sat, June 21	at Winnipeg Blue Bombers	L 18–28	1–2	Winnipeg Stadium	26,921

== Regular season ==
=== Season standings ===
West Division
Pos	Team	Pld	W	L	T	PF	PA	PD	Pts
1	Edmonton Eskimos (Q)	18	13	4	1	540	365	+175	27
2	BC Lions (Q)	18	12	6	0	441	410	+31	24
3	Winnipeg Blue Bombers (Q)	18	11	7	0	545	387	+158	22
4	Calgary Stampeders (Q)	18	11	7	0	484	380	+104	22
5	Saskatchewan Roughriders	18	6	11	1	382	517	−135	13

Source: "1986 Regular Season Standings". Archived from the original on 2009-10-16.
(Q) Qualified for playoffs

=== Season schedule ===
Week	Game	Date	Opponent	Results		Venue	Attendance
Week	Game	Date	Opponent	Score	Record	Venue	Attendance
1	1	Thu, June 26	vs. Winnipeg Blue Bombers	W 28–17	1–0	BC Place	41,704
2	2	Thu, July 3	at Edmonton Eskimos	L 13–36	1–1	Commonwealth Stadium	32,757
3	3	Fri, July 11	vs. Toronto Argonauts	W 28–17	2–1	BC Place	42,326
4	4	Sat, July 19	vs. Montreal Alouettes	W 27–20	3–1	BC Place	42,158
5	5	Fri, July 25	at Hamilton Tiger-Cats	W 36–21	4–1	Ivor Wynne Stadium	16,462
6	6	Thu, July 31	at Calgary Stampeders	W 18–17	5–1	McMahon Stadium	27,659
7	7	Sat, Aug 9	vs. Saskatchewan Roughriders	W 39–24	6–1	BC Place	48,984
8	8	Fri, Aug 15	at Ottawa Rough Riders	W 25–19	7–1	Lansdowne Park	23,177
9	9	Thu, Aug 21	vs. Calgary Stampeders	L 14–30	7–2	BC Place	49,147
10	Bye						
11	10	Thu, Sept 4	vs. Ottawa Rough Riders	W 40–10	8–2	BC Place	40,091
12	11	Sun, Sept 14	at Toronto Argonauts	W 34–24	9–2	Exhibition Stadium	29,714
13	12	Fri, Sept 19	vs. Edmonton Eskimos	L 3–32	9–3	BC Place	59,478
14	13	Fri, Sept 26	at Edmonton Eskimos	L 13–31	9–4	Commonwealth Stadium	41,570
15	14	Sun, Oct 5	at Montreal Alouettes	L 15–28	9–5	Olympic Stadium	10,826
16	Bye						
17	15	Sat, Oct 18	vs. Hamilton Tiger-Cats	L 17–23	9–6	BC Place	40,127
18	16	Sun, Oct 26	at Saskatchewan Roughriders	W 29–17	10–6	Taylor Field	16,388
19	17	Sun, Nov 2	at Winnipeg Blue Bombers	W 26–20	11–6	Winnipeg Stadium	31,817
20	18	Sat, Nov 8	vs. Winnipeg Blue Bombers	W 36–24	12–6	BC Place	54,723

== Awards and records ==
- CFL's Most Outstanding Defensive Player Award – James "Quick" Parker (DE)
- CFLPA's Most Outstanding Community Service Award – Tyrone Crews (LB)

=== 1986 CFL All-Stars ===
- DE – James "Quick" Parker, CFL All-Star
- DB – Larry Crawford, CFL All-Star

== Playoffs ==
=== West Semi-Final ===
Team	Q1	Q2	Q3	Q4	Total
BC Lions	11	10	0	0	21
Winnipeg Blue Bombers	0	0	0	14	14

=== West Final ===
Team	Q1	Q2	Q3	Q4	Total
Edmonton Eskimos	17	6	4	14	41
BC Lions	0	1	4	0	5

== Roster ==
1986 BC Lions final roster
Quarterbacks: 9 Roy Dewalt; 17 Greg Vavra; 6 Karlton Watson; Running backs: 25 Ray Crouse; 23 Keyvan Jenkins; 33 Chris Spence; 20 John Henry White; Receivers: 8 Ned Armour; 27 Jan Carinci K; 24 Mervyn Fernandez; 34 Scott Lecky; 36 Paul Nastasiuk; 21 John Pankratz; 3 Jim Sandusky	Offensive linemen: 68 John Blain T/G; 69 Jamie Buis T/C; 54 Glenn Leonhard G; 66 Jim Mills T; 65 Gerald Roper G; 55 Ian Sinclair G/C; 50 Bob Skemp G; 52 Al Wilson C; Defensive linemen: 78 Walter Ballard DE; 77 Mike Gray DT; 60 Bennie Jones DT; 90 Rick Klassen DT; 40 James Parker DE; 45 Gregg Stumon DE; Special teams: 5 Lui Passaglia K/P	Linebackers: 91 Tyrone Crews; 7 Bernie Glier; 37 Glen Jackson; 31 Kevin Konar; 42 Marty Palazeti; 76 John Ulmer; 51 Richard White; Defensive backs: 12 Bruce Barnett; 10 Melvin Byrd; 1 Darnell Clash; 28 Larry Crawford; 14 Andre Francis; 18 Keith Gooch; 32 Andre Jones; 4 Nelson Martin; 26 Darrell Slater; Italics indicate International player
