= 1986 Hamilton Tiger-Cats season =

Season of Canadian Football League team the Hamilton Tiger-Cats

- Head coach: Al Bruno
- Home stadium: Ivor Wynne Stadium

Results
- Record: 9–8–1
- Division place: 2nd, East
- Playoffs: Won Grey Cup
- Team MOP: Less Browne
- Team MOC: Rocky DiPietro
- Team MOR: Paul Osbaldiston

Uniform

The 1986 Hamilton Tiger-Cats season was the 29th season for the team in the Canadian Football League (CFL) and their 37th overall. The Tiger-Cats finished in second place in the East Division with a 9–8–1 record and won the Grey Cup over the Edmonton Eskimos.

Tiger-Cats owner Harold Ballard claimed to be losing a million dollars a year as owner of the Tiger-Cats. In 1986, Ballard publicly called the Tiger-Cats a bunch of overpaid losers. After the Tiger Cats beat the Toronto Argonauts in the 1986 Eastern Final, Ballard said "You guys may still be overpaid, but after today, no one can call you losers." A few days later, the Tiger-Cats won the 1986 Grey Cup by beating the Edmonton Eskimos 39–15 and Ballard said it was worth every penny.

Mike Kerrigan and Paul Osbaldiston were in their first years with the Tiger-Cats.

== Preseason ==
Game	Date	Opponent	Results		Venue	Attendance
Game	Date	Opponent	Score	Record	Venue	Attendance
A	June 11	vs. Toronto Argonauts	W 21–7	1–0	Ivor Wynne Stadium	17,750
B	June 18	at Ottawa Rough Riders	L 16–23	1–1	Lansdowne Park	13,621

== Regular season ==
=== Season standings ===
East Division
Pos	Team	Pld	W	L	T	PF	PA	PD	Pts	Div	Stk
1	Toronto Argonauts (C, Q)	18	10	8	0	417	441	−24	20	7–1	W2
2	Hamilton Tiger-Cats (Q)	18	9	8	1	405	366	39	19	5–3	W3
3	Montreal Alouettes (Q)	18	4	14	0	320	500	−180	8	1–7	L3
4	Ottawa Rough Riders	18	3	14	1	346	514	−168	7	3–5	L1

(C) First round bye; (Q) Qualified for playoffs

=== Season schedule ===
Week	Game	Date	Opponent	Results		Venue	Attendance
Week	Game	Date	Opponent	Score	Record	Venue	Attendance
1	1	June 26	at Toronto Argonauts	L 20–21	0–1	Exhibition Stadium	23,100
2	2	July 3	vs. Ottawa Rough Riders	L 2–18	0–2	Ivor Wynne Stadium	15,877
3	3	July 12	vs. Winnipeg Blue Bombers	W 28–11	1–2	Ivor Wynne Stadium	13,664
4	4	July 18	at Calgary Stampeders	L 21–23	1–3	McMahon Stadium	26,201
5	5	July 25	vs. BC Lions	L 21–36	1–4	Ivor Wynne Stadium	16,462
6	Bye						
7	6	Aug 7	at Winnipeg Blue Bombers	L 30–36	1–5	Winnipeg Stadium	25,982
8	7	Aug 16	vs. Saskatchewan Roughriders	W 23–21	2–5	Ivor Wynne Stadium	14,907
9	8	Aug 21	at Montreal Alouettes	W 28–23	3–5	Olympic Stadium	12,158
10	9	Sept 1	vs. Montreal Alouettes	W 42–7	4–5	Ivor Wynne Stadium	23,185
11	10	Sept 7	at Toronto Argonauts	L 23–25	4–6	Exhibition Stadium	28,531
12	11	Sept 14	at Saskatchewan Roughriders	T 21–21	4–6–1	Taylor Field	18,565
13	12	Sept 21	vs. Calgary Stampeders	W 20–15	5–6–1	Ivor Wynne Stadium	15,105
14	13	Sept 27	at Ottawa Rough Riders	W 31–11	6–6–1	Lansdowne Park	17,192
15	14	Oct 4	vs. Edmonton Eskimos	L 23–24	6–7–1	Ivor Wynne Stadium	17,352
16	15	Oct 10	at Edmonton Eskimos	L 3–30	6–8–1	Commonwealth Stadium	38,385
17	16	Oct 18	at BC Lions	W 23–17	7–8–1	BC Place	40,127
18	17	Oct 26	vs. Toronto Argonauts	W 20–10	8–8–1	Ivor Wynne Stadium	24,430
19	Bye						
20	18	Nov 7	vs. Ottawa Rough Riders	W 20–19	9–8–1	Ivor Wynne Stadium	14,101

== Playoffs ==
=== Schedule ===
Round	Date	Opponent	Results		Venue	Attendance
Round	Date	Opponent	Score	Record	Venue	Attendance
Eastern Final #1	Nov 16	vs. Toronto Argonauts	L 17–31	0–1	Ivor Wynne Stadium	23,126
Eastern Final #2	Nov 23	at Toronto Argonauts	W 42–25	1–1	Exhibition Stadium	32,041
Grey Cup	Nov 30	vs. Edmonton Eskimos	W 39–15	2–1	BC Place	59,621

==== Grey Cup ====
Teams	Q1	Q2	Q3	Q4	Final
Edmonton Eskimos	0	0	7	8	15
Hamilton Tiger-Cats	17	12	7	3	39

== Roster ==
1986 Hamilton Tiger-Cats final roster
Quarterbacks: 4 Ken Hobart; 2 Mike Kerrigan; 8 Tom Porras; Running backs: 34 Walt Bender; 30 Dan Huclack; 19 Johnny Shepherd; 35 Jed Tommy; 21 Ken Zachary; Wide receivers: 1 Tony Champion; 75 Ron Ingram; 17 Wayne Lee; 80 Steve Stapler P; Tight ends: 23 Rocky Dipietro; 74 Steve Jackson	Offensive linemen: 63 Marv Allemang C; 51 Pat Brady G; 68 Mike Derks C/T; 66 Miles Gorrell T; 62 John Malinosky T; 56 Jason Riley G; 56 Dale Sanderson T/C; 67 Ralph Scholz G/T; Defensive linemen: 93 Romel Andrews DE; 77 Grover Covington DE; 64 Leon Lyszkiewicz DT; 79 Mark Napiorkowski DT/DE; 65 Mitchell Price DT; 59 Rod Skillman DE; 61 Mike Walker DT; Special teams: 3 Paul Osbaldiston K/P	Linebackers: 72 Leo Ezerins; 41 Greg Gary; 39 Ed Gataveckas; 36 John Priestner; 43 Frank Robinson; 33 Mike Robinson; 31 Ben Zambiasi; Defensive backs: 14 Calvin Adams; 27 Paul Bennett; 15 Less Browne; 16 Howard Fields; 37 Terry Lehne; 6 Jim Rockford; 28 Lance Shields; 20 Mark Streeter; Injured list: 10 Bernie Ruoff K/P; 88 Dave Sauve DE; Italics indicate American players
