= Vancouver Technical Secondary School =

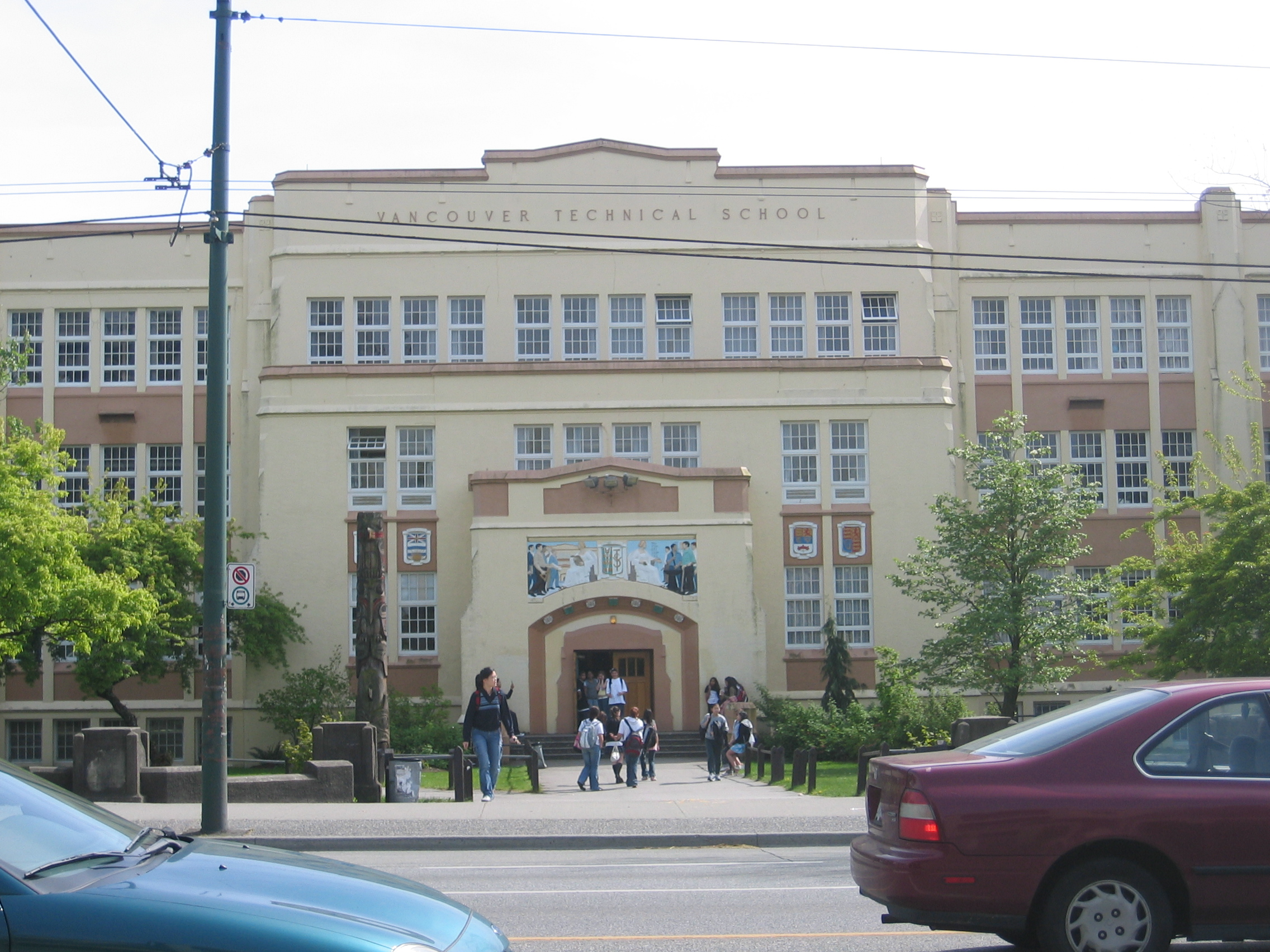
- Vancouver Technical Secondary from East Broadway

Location
- 2600 East Broadway; Vancouver, British Columbia, V5M 1Y5; Canada; 49.2614°N 123.0517°W

Information
- School type: Secondary school
- Motto: "Semper Sursum" (Ever Upwards)
- Founded: 1916
- School board: School District 39 Vancouver
- Superintendent: Helen McGregor
- Area trustee: Alfred Chien
- School number: 03939011
- Principal: Roberto Moro
- Grades: 8-12
- Enrollment: 1620 Students
- Language: English, French immersion
- Area: Mount Pleasant; Grandview-Woodland; Hastings-Sunrise; Renfrew-Collingwood
- Colours: Forest Green and Gold
- Mascot: Talisman
- Team name: Van Tech Talismen
- Public transit access: 7, 9, 16, Millennium Line (Skytrain), 27, 99 - (Select Trips Only)
- Website: vantech.vsb.bc.ca
- Last updated: March 2020

Vancouver Technical Secondary School, often referred to as Van Tech, is a public secondary school located on the East Side of Vancouver, British Columbia, Canada. Vancouver Technical currently offers Advanced Placement, Summit, Flex Humanities, and French Immersion programs.

== History ==
Vancouver Technical School opened in September 1916 as a boys-only school and was located in the basement of King Edward High School at 12th and Oak. It was the province's first vocational school and was led by J. George Lister, who would later be called the "Founder of Technical Education in BC. The school then moved to the Labour Temple, located on the corner of Homer and Dunsmuir.

As enrollment grew, plans were developed for a modern technical school along Broadway. The building was designed by architects Townley and Matheson to include large technical shops, laboratories, cafeteria, auditorium, gymnasium, and swimming pool. However, the swimming pool was never completed due to lack of funds. The school moved to the new building in 1928, where it is located to this day. Girls were admitted into the school starting in 1940 and were given their own wing on the eastern side of the school.

Major seismic upgrades to the school's five buildings began in 2005 and was completed in 2008 at a cost of $40 million. The seismic upgrades reduced the available floorspace, leading to the relocation of classroom and workshops. Classrooms and workshops were relocated or replaced during the upgrade as there was less floor space available. this reduced the school's capacity from 2,100 students to 1,700. The auditorium's interior was also renovated during the upgrade, with the funds being raised by students' parents.

One of the school's founders (and principal from 1930 until 1944), James George Sinclair, is also the great-grandfather of 23rd Canadian Prime Minister Justin Trudeau.

== Mini Schools ==
Vancouver Technical offers two mini school programs.

Summit is a five-year mini school program as of 2018, which focuses on enriching the four academic courses: Math, Science, Social Studies and English. The Summit program offers accelerated sciences and mathematics, with students completing Chemistry 11 and Pre-Calculus 11 in grade 10. Students in the Summit program engage in many extra-curricular activities including a three-day camp at the beginning of the school year, and opportunities to travel to Europe.

Flex Humanities is a mini-school that integrates Philosophy, World Literature, History, Fine Arts, Film and Media Studies, and Integrated Arts and Technology from grades 8 – 12. In grade 12, the students have the opportunity to participate in a major culminative field study; in past years, this trip has involved Quebec City/Montreal or New York.

== Facilities ==
With its seismic upgrade from 2005 - 2008, many classrooms were moved and their 500 wing was demolished. With this, Vancouver Technical was a recipient to a $1,000,000 artificial turf field that was approved in 2006. Tennis courts were built off Slocan Street. and Vancouver Technical is set to receive Vancouver's first regulation Track and Field Training Facility as of May 2020.

== Notable alumni ==
- Greg Joy, Olympic Silver Medalist - track and field
- Lori Fung, Olympic Gold Medalist - rhythmic gymnastics
- Dale Mitchell (soccer), member of the Canadian Soccer and BC Sports Hall of Fame, former national team and Vancouver Whitecaps soccer player and coach
- Sam Sullivan, former mayor of the city of Vancouver, former MLA for Vancouver False Creek
- Bowinn Ma, MLA for North Vancouver-Lonsdale
- John Ferguson (1938–2007), NHL player/coach
- Dean Malkoc, NHL player for the Vancouver Canucks, Boston Bruins, and New York Islanders
- Julia Grosso, Soccer player for Canadian women's national team and 2020 Olympic Gold Medalist
- Milton Wong, Member of the Order of Canada, Order of British Columbia, Chancellor, Simon Fraser University, Business Laureates of British Columbia Hall of Fame, philanthropist
- Dave Easley - played and coached in the BC Lions. Dave Easley

== Popular culture ==
- Exterior shots of the school were used in the CW's television series Smallville to represent Smallville High School, Clark Kent's alma mater during adolescence. The school was also used as a filming location in Scary Movie, Paycheck, Supernatural, iZombie, Psych, Supergirl, Air Bud Returns,The Killing, She's the Man starring Amanda Bynes and Channing Tatum, and Ernest Goes to School. The school's gymnasium was also used in the Diary of a Wimpy Kid (film series) live-action films.
