= Dave Easley =

Canadian football player

Profile
- Position: Defensive back

Personal information
- Born: August 12, 1947 (age 79); Vancouver, British Columbia, Canada

Career information
- College: none - Vancouver Blue Bombers (Jr.)

Career history

Playing
- 1969–72: BC Lions
- 1973–76: Hamilton Tiger-Cats
- 1976: Edmonton Eskimos

Coaching
- 1982: Vancouver Trojans
- 1983–87: UBC Thunderbirds
- 1987–88: Adelaide Eagles
- 1989–90: UBC Thunderbirds
- 1991–92: Toronto Argonauts
- 1993–99: BC Lions
- 2000–01: Montreal Alouettes
- 2002–04: Ottawa Renegades
- 2005: Winnipeg Blue Bombers
- 2006: Manitoba Bisons
- 2008–10: Hamilton Tiger-Cats

Awards and highlights
- Dr. Beattie Martin Trophy (1969)

Dave Easley is a former award-winning defensive back who played in the Canadian Football League from 1969 to 1976.

A native of Vancouver, Easley played junior football with the Vancouver Blue Bombers and graduated to the BC Lions in 1969. His 4 interceptions and 50 punt returns for 359 yards won him the Dr. Beattie Martin Trophy as best Canadian rookie in the west. He played 4 seasons and 69 games with the Lions. He later played 4 seasons with the Hamilton Tiger-Cats and finished his playing career in 1976 with the Edmonton Eskimos. He had 15 interceptions for 1 touchdown.

After his playing days Easley took up coaching. Dave started coaching junior football and led the Vancouver Trojans to the National Championship in 1982. He later became defensive coach for the UBC Thunderbirds from 1983 to 1987 and 1989 to 1990 (with time spent as head coach of the Adelaide Eagles in Australia in 1987 and 1988) including the Vanier Cup Championship in 1986. Dave joined the professional coaching ranks with the Toronto Argonauts for the 1991 and 1992 seasons as linebacker coach (where he earned his first Grey Cup ring).

He had gained CFL coaching experience as a guest coach with the Saskatchewan Roughriders in 1984 and with the Lions in 1985 and 1986. In 1993, he joined Lions as defensive line coach. In 1994 and 1995 he coached the linebackers as well as special teams, earning his second Grey Cup ring. In 1996 and 1998 to 1999 he coached the defensive backs and special teams and was defensive coordinator in 1997.

He joined the Montreal Alouettes as special teams coordinator in 2000–2001 and would make a stop in Ottawa in 2002 when he was named defensive coordinator of the Ottawa Renegades. He spent another two seasons in Ottawa as the team's special teams coordinator before joining the Winnipeg Blue Bombers as their defensive backs coach in 2005. Easley spent 2006 with the University of Manitoba, serving as the Bisons’ advisor to the defensive backs coach and special teams coaches. Most recently he was special teams coordinator with the Hamilton Tiger-Cats, until 2010

Easley is the only coach in Canadian football history to capture national championships at the junior, university and professional levels.
