= 1986 Edmonton Eskimos season =

- General manager: Hugh Campbell
- Head coach: Jackie Parker
- Home stadium: Commonwealth Stadium

Results
- Record: 13–4–1
- Division place: 1st, West
- Playoffs: Lost Grey Cup

The 1986 Edmonton Eskimos finished in first place in the West Division with a 13–4–1 record. The Eskimos offense had 623 points for, while the defense had 427 points allowed. They lost in the 74th Grey Cup.

== Preseason ==
Week	Game	Date	Opponent	Results		Venue	Attendance
Week	Game	Date	Opponent	Score	Record	Venue	Attendance
	1	June 9	at Winnipeg Blue Bombers	L 7–22	0–1	Winnipeg Stadium	21,526
	2	June 16	Saskatchewan Roughriders	W 34–18	1–1	Commonwealth Stadium	29,604

== Regular season ==
=== Standings ===
West Division
Pos	Team	Pld	W	L	T	PF	PA	PD	Pts
1	Edmonton Eskimos (Q)	18	13	4	1	540	365	+175	27
2	BC Lions (Q)	18	12	6	0	441	410	+31	24
3	Winnipeg Blue Bombers (Q)	18	11	7	0	545	387	+158	22
4	Calgary Stampeders (Q)	18	11	7	0	484	380	+104	22
5	Saskatchewan Roughriders	18	6	11	1	382	517	−135	13

Source: "1986 Regular Season Standings". Archived from the original on 2009-10-16.
(Q) Qualified for playoffs

=== Schedule ===
Week	Game	Date	Opponent	Results		Venue	Attendance
Week	Game	Date	Opponent	Score	Record	Venue	Attendance
	1	June 24	at Calgary Stampeders	W 21–20	1–0	McMahon Stadium	27,120
	2	July 3	BC Lions	W 36–13	2–0	Commonwealth Stadium	32,757
	3	July 12	at Saskatchewan Roughriders	W 31–19	3–0	Taylor Field	16,494
	4	July 17	Ottawa Rough Riders	W 49–39	4–0	Commonwealth Stadium	33,922
	5	August 1	Toronto Argonauts	L 34–35	4–1	Commonwealth Stadium	38,672
	6	August 7	at Montreal Alouettes	L 6–17	4–2	Olympic Stadium	11,203
	7	August 15	Winnipeg Blue Bombers	W 33–5	5–2	Commonwealth Stadium	40,617
	8	August 23	at Toronto Argonauts	L 20–26	5–3	Exhibition Stadium	28,833
	9	September 1	at Calgary Stampeders	W 42–19	6–3	McMahon Stadium	33,626
	10	September 7	Montreal Alouettes	W 37–22	7–3	Commonwealth Stadium	37,332
	11	September 19	at BC Lions	W 32–3	8–3	BC Place	59,478
	12	September 26	BC Lions	W 31–13	9–3	Commonwealth Stadium	41,570
	13	October 4	at Hamilton Tiger-Cats	W 24–23	10–3	Ivor Wynne Stadium	17,352
	14	October 10	Hamilton Tiger-Cats	W 28–9	11–3	Commonwealth Stadium	38,385
	15	October 19	Calgary Stampeders	W 38–13	12–3	Commonwealth Stadium	53,504
	16	October 25	at Winnipeg Blue Bombers	L 20–42	12–4	Winnipeg Stadium	32,946
	17	November 1	at Ottawa Rough Riders	T 16–16 OT	12–4–1	Lansdowne Park	13,936
	18	November 9	Saskatchewan Roughriders	W 42–14	13–4–1	Commonwealth Stadium	44,121

==== Postseason ====
Round	Date	Opponent	Results		Venue	Attendance
Round	Date	Opponent	Score	Record	Venue	Attendance
1	November 16	vs. Calgary Stampeders	W 27–18	1–0	Commonwealth Stadium	24,064
2	November 23	vs. BC Lions	W 41–5	2–0	Commonwealth Stadium	32,490
3	November 30	vs. Hamilton Tiger-Cats	L 15–39	2–1	BC Place	59,621

=== Player stats ===
==== Passing ====
Player	Games Played	Attempts	Completions	Yards	Pct.	Interceptions	Long	Touchdowns
Matt Dunigan	18	485	275	3648	56.7	14	68	25

==== Punt Returns ====
Player	Games Played	Number	Yards	Long	Touchdowns
Henry Gizmo Williams	8	37	423	74	1

==== Kickoff Returns ====
Player	Games Played	Number	Yards	Long	Touchdowns
Henry Gizmo Williams	8	9	210	35	0

=== Awards and honors ===
- Dave Dryburgh Memorial Trophy – Tom Dixon
