= 1986 Winnipeg Blue Bombers season =

Canadian football team season

- General manager: Cal Murphy
- Head coach: Cal Murphy
- Home stadium: Winnipeg Stadium

Results
- Record: 11–7
- Division place: 3rd, West
- Playoffs: Lost West Semi-Final

The 1986 Winnipeg Blue Bombers finished in third place in the West Division with an 11–7 record. They played in the West Semi-Final but lost to the BC Lions.

== Preseason ==
Game	Date	Opponent	Results		Venue	Attendance
Game	Date	Opponent	Score	Record	Venue	Attendance
A	Sat, June 7	vs. Montreal Alouettes	W 35–10	1–0	Canada Games Stadium	11,463
B	Sun, June 9	vs. Edmonton Eskimos	W 22–7	2–0	Winnipeg Stadium	21,526
C	Fri, June 13	at Calgary Stampeders	W 17–15	3–0	McMahon Stadium	25,557
D	Sat, June 21	at BC Lions	W 28–18	4–0	BC Place	26,921

== Regular season ==
=== Standings ===
West Division
Pos	Team	Pld	W	L	T	PF	PA	PD	Pts
1	Edmonton Eskimos (C, Q)	18	13	4	1	540	365	+175	27
2	BC Lions (Q)	18	12	6	0	441	410	+31	24
3	Winnipeg Blue Bombers (Q)	18	11	7	0	545	387	+158	22
4	Calgary Stampeders	18	11	7	0	484	380	+104	22
5	Saskatchewan Roughriders	18	6	11	1	382	517	−135	13

Source: "1986 Regular Season Standings". Archived from the original on 2009-10-16.
(C) First round bye; (Q) Qualified for playoffs

=== Schedule ===
Week	Game	Date	Opponent	Results		Venue	Attendance
Week	Game	Date	Opponent	Score	Record	Venue	Attendance
1	1	Thu, June 26	at BC Lions	L 17–28	0–1	BC Place	41,704
2	2	Sat, July 5	vs. Saskatchewan Roughriders	W 56–0	1–1	Winnipeg Stadium	26,746
3	3	Sat, July 12	at Hamilton Tiger-Cats	L 11–28	1–2	Ivor Wynne Stadium	13,664
4	Bye						
5	4	Thu, July 24	vs. Calgary Stampeders	W 25–20	2–2	Winnipeg Stadium	25,197
6	5	Fri, Aug 1	at Montreal Alouettes	W 37–10	3–2	Olympic Stadium	14,127
7	6	Thu, Aug 7	vs. Hamilton Tiger-Cats	W 36–30	4–2	Winnipeg Stadium	25,982
8	7	Fri, Aug 15	at Edmonton Eskimos	L 5–33	4–3	Commonwealth Stadium	40,617
9	8	Fri, Aug 22	vs. Ottawa Rough Riders	W 46–14	5–3	Winnipeg Stadium	23,918
10	9	Sun, Aug 31	at Saskatchewan Roughriders	L 30–34	5–4	Taylor Field	25,274
11	10	Fri, Sept 5	vs. Saskatchewan Roughriders	W 38–14	6–4	Winnipeg Stadium	24,996
12	11	Thu, Sept 11	at Calgary Stampeders	L 27–38	6–5	McMahon Stadium	26,184
13	12	Thu, Sept 18	vs. Montreal Alouettes	W 39–14	7–5	Winnipeg Stadium	21,899
14	13	Sun, Sept 28	at Toronto Argonauts	W 26–16	8–5	Exhibition Stadium	25,300
15	14	Sun, Oct 5	vs. Toronto Argonauts	W 48–20	9–5	Winnipeg Stadium	28,356
16	15	Mon, Oct 13	at Ottawa Rough Riders	W 18–16	10–5	Lansdowne Park	13,572
17	Bye						
18	16	Sat, Oct 25	vs. Edmonton Eskimos	W 42–20	11–5	Winnipeg Stadium	32,946
19	17	Sun, Nov 2	vs. BC Lions	L 20–26	11–6	Winnipeg Stadium	31,817
20	18	Sat, Nov 8	at BC Lions	L 24–36	11–7	BC Place	54,723

== Playoffs ==
=== West Semi-Final ===
Team	Q1	Q2	Q3	Q4	Total
Winnipeg Blue Bombers	0	0	0	14	14
BC Lions	11	10	0	0	21

== Roster ==
1986 Winnipeg Blue Bombers final roster
Quarterbacks: 2 Tom Clements; 12 John Hufnagel; 9 Homer Jordan; 8 Tom Muecke; Running backs: 25 Lester Brown; 33 Pat Cantner; 39 Sean Kehoe; 38 Willard Reaves; 10 James Sykes; Receivers: 70 Jeff Boyd; 73 Randy Fabi K; 21 James Murphy; 71 Joe Poplawski K; 79 David Taylor; 22 Perry Tuttle	Offensive linemen: 65 Nick Bastaja G; 59 Lyle Bauer G; 51 David Black T; 44 Mike Hameluck C; 60 Bob Molle G; 50 Mark Moors G/C; 62 Richard Nemeth T; 63 Chris Walby T; Defensive linemen: 60 Hasson Arbubakrr DE; 75 Stan Mikawos DT; 55 Tony Norman DE; 52 Rob Prodanovic DT; 57 John Sturdivant DE; Special teams: 6 Bob Cameron P; 3 Trevor Kennerd K	Linebackers: 72 Delbert Fowler; 35 Tyrone Jones; 61 Tracey Mack; 74 Vernon Pahl; 76 Darrell Patterson; 58 James West; Defensive backs: 23 Roy Bennett; 14 Scott Flagel; 24 Ken Hailey; 20 James Jefferson; 27 Lyndell Jones; 30 Darryl Sampson; 36 David Shaw; 37 Bennie Thompson; Italics indicate International player
