= 1986 Calgary Stampeders season =

Canadian football team season

- General manager: Earl Lunsford
- Head coach: Bob Vespaziani
- Home stadium: McMahon Stadium

Results
- Record: 11–7
- Division place: 4th, West
- Playoffs: Lost West Semi-Final

The 1986 Calgary Stampeders finished in fourth place in the West Division with a 11–7 record. They made the playoffs due to a new rule, in which a fourth place team from one division can qualify for the playoffs as long as they earned more points than the third place team from the opposing division. However, the Stampeders would remain in the West division throughout the playoffs. They faced division rival Edmonton Eskimos in the West Semi-Finals, where they lost 27–18.

== Offseason ==
=== CFL Draft - Stampeders Picks ===
Rd	Pick	Player	Position	School
1	1	Kent Warnock	DE	Calgary
2	14	Andy Stubbert	RB/FB	Queen's
3	19	Mike Torresan	G	British Columbia
3	21	Dave Pappin	LB	McMaster
4	28	Steve Hudson	T/G	Queen's
5	37	Tyler Robinson	DB	Calgary
6	46	Albert Calaguiro	TB	Concordia
7	55	Keith Holiday	LB	Calgary
8	64	John Smith	LB	Calgary

== Preseason ==
Date	Opponent	Score	Result
June 13	Winnipeg Blue Bombers	15-17	Blue Bombers Win
June 17	at BC Lions	41-20	Stampeders Win

== Regular season ==
=== Season standings ===
West Division
Pos	Team	Pld	W	L	T	PF	PA	PD	Pts
1	Edmonton Eskimos (Q)	18	13	4	1	540	365	+175	27
2	BC Lions (Q)	18	12	6	0	441	410	+31	24
3	Winnipeg Blue Bombers (Q)	18	11	7	0	545	387	+158	22
4	Calgary Stampeders (Q)	18	11	7	0	484	380	+104	22
5	Saskatchewan Roughriders	18	6	11	1	382	517	−135	13

Source: "1986 Regular Season Standings". Archived from the original on 2009-10-16.
(Q) Qualified for playoffs

=== Season schedule ===
Week	Game	Date	Opponent	Results		Venue	Attendance
Week	Game	Date	Opponent	Score	Record	Venue	Attendance
	1	June 24	Edmonton Eskimos	L 20–21	0–1	McMahon Stadium	27,120
	2	June 29	at Saskatchewan Roughriders	L 14–28	0–2	Taylor Field	16,937
	3	July 10	at Ottawa Rough Riders	W 31–15	1–2	Lansdowne Park	21,266
	4	July 18	Hamilton Tiger-Cats	W 23–21	2–2	McMahon Stadium	26,201
	5	July 24	at Winnipeg Blue Bombers	L 20–25	2–3	Winnipeg Stadium	25,197
	6	July 31	BC Lions	L 17–18	2–4	McMahon Stadium	27,659
	7	August 8	at Toronto Argonauts	W 31–26	3–4	Exhibition Stadium	25,752
	8	August 14	Montreal Alouettes	W 21–10	4–4	McMahon Stadium	28,063
	9	August 21	at BC Lions	W 30–14	5–4	BC Place	49,147
	10	September 1	Edmonton Eskimos	L 19–42	5–5	McMahon Stadium	33,626
	11	September 11	Winnipeg Blue Bombers	W 28–27	6–5	McMahon Stadium	26,184
	12	September 21	at Hamilton Tiger-Cats	L 15–20	6–6	Ivor Wynne Stadium	15,105
	13	September 28	at Saskatchewan Roughriders	W 39–24	7–6	Taylor Field	25,078
	14	October 3	Ottawa Rough Riders	W 41–21	8–6	McMahon Stadium	26,074
	15	October 13	Toronto Argonauts	W 37–14	9–6	McMahon Stadium	25,939
	16	October 19	at Edmonton Eskimos	L 13–38	9–7	Commonwealth Stadium	53,504
	17	October 24	at Montreal Alouettes	W 32–12	10–7	Olympic Stadium	9,665
	18	October 31	Saskatchewan Roughriders	W 36–4	11–7	McMahon Stadium	24,704

== Playoffs ==
=== West Semi-Final ===
Team	Q1	Q2	Q3	Q4	Total
Calgary Stampeders	?	?	?	?	18
Edmonton Eskimos	?	?	?	?	27

== Roster ==
1986 Calgary Stampeders final roster
Quarterbacks: 16 Rick Johnson; 9 Jeff Tedford; 17 Rick Worman; Running backs: 21 Gary Allen; 20 Dwight Beverly; 7 Greg Fieger; 12 Tim Petros; 33 Ryan Potter; Receivers: 88 Ray Alexander; 71 Jay Christensen; 81 Jamie Harris; 34 Kevin Neiles; 23 Tag Rome; 19 Emanuel Tolbert; 76 Marshall Toner; 89 Larry Willis; 11 Tony Woodruff	Offensive linemen: 51 Randy Ambrosie T; 56 John Coflin C; 63 George Gilbert G; 69 Dave Kirzinger G/T; 65 Sean McKeown T; 57 Bob Poley C; 54 Rob Smith G; 61 Tom Spoletini G; 68 Kari Yli-Renko T; Defensive linemen: 84 Gene Belliveau DE; 64 Brian Belway DT; 78 Vince Goldsmith DE; 60 Harold Hallman DT; 75 Stu Laird DT; 62 David Ponder DT	Linebackers: 40 Garrett Doll; 35 Eric Emery; 85 Mike Emery; 72 Bernie Morrison; 13 Alvis Satele; 96 Anthony Woodson; Defensive backs: 27 Richie Hall; 14 Larry Hogue; 15 Ron Hopkins; 28 Melvin Jenkins; 32 Darcy Kopp; 24 Greg Peterson; 36 Robert Turner; Special teams: 6 Glenn Harper P; 2 J. T. Hay K; Italics indicate International player
