= Cory Philpot =

Canadian football player and coach (born 1970)

Langley Rams
- Title: Head coach

Personal information
- Born: May 15, 1970 (age 56); Melbourne, Florida, U.S.
- Listed height: 5 ft 9 in (1.75 m)
- Listed weight: 186 lb (84 kg)

Career information
- Position: Running back
- College: Mississippi

Career history

Playing
- 1993–1997: BC Lions
- 1999–2000: Winnipeg Blue Bombers

Coaching
- 2004: North Delta Longhorns (VMFL)
- 2005: South Fraser Rams (CJFL)
- 2006–2009: Vancouver Trojans (HC) (CJFL)
- 2018–2020: Langley Rams (AC) (CJFL)
- 2021–present: Langley Rams (HC) (CJFL)

Awards and highlights
- Grey Cup champion (1994); 2× Eddie James Memorial Trophy (1994, 1995); CFL All-Star (1995); First-team All-SEC (1992)

Cory Philpot (born May 15, 1970) is a Canadian football coach and a former professional running back who is currently the head coach for the Langley Rams of the Canadian Junior Football League (CJFL). He played for eight seasons in the Canadian Football League (CFL) for the BC Lions and Winnipeg Blue Bombers. He played on the Lions' winning Grey Cup team in 1994.

== College career ==
Philpot played junior college football at Itawamba Community College in 1989 and 1990 and college football at the University of Mississippi for the Rebels from 1990 to 1992.

== Professional career ==
Philpot joined the BC Lions for the 1993 season. In his sophomore year, he played in 15 regular season games where he had 201 carries for 1,451 yards and 13 touchdowns. He won a Grey Cup championship as the Lions defeated Baltimore in the 82nd Grey Cup game in 1994.

In 1995, Philpot set the CFL record for most touchdowns in a season with 22, a record that was broken by Milt Stegall in the 2003 CFL season. He was a two-time winner of the Eddie James Memorial Trophy for top rusher (Western Division) in 1994 and 1995. Philpot's nickname while playing for the Lions was "Quick Six" which alluded to the number 6 jersey that he wore, and even more so his ankle breaking moves that were sure to put up a quick 6 on the scoreboard.

== Coaching career ==
Philpot coached in the CJFL for South Fraser Rams in 2005 before joining the Vancouver Trojans in 2006 where he served as head coach for four years.

In 2010, he joined the Board of Directors for the BC Football Conference as a Game Commissioner and the Conference Head Coach. In 2015, he became the first President of the BC Provincial Football Association (BCPFA).

In 2018, Philpot returned to coaching as an assistant coach for the Langley Rams. On August 11, 2021, he was promoted to head coach of the Rams. In his first season, he led the team to their first national championship in their Canadian Bowl win over the London Beefeaters. February 4th 2025 transfers to Seaquam Secondary to assume role as Head Coach in a high-school football league.

== Personal life ==
Philpot has two sons, twins Jalen Philpot and Tyson Philpot, both play in the CFL as wide receivers.
