= South Australian Gridiron Association =

American football SA
- Current season, competition or edition: 2024/2025
- Sport: American football
- Founded: 1985
- President: Ernesto Covino
- No. of teams: 4
- Country: Australia
- Most recent champion: Seniors: Adelaide Hogs Juniors: UniSA Eagles (2025)
- Website: https://www.americanfootballsa.org.au

American Football South Australia (formerly the South Australian Gridiron Association until 1990), also known as American Football SA or AFSA, is the governing body for American football (gridiron) in the state of South Australia, Australia. There are currently four teams registered in the league.

== Venues ==
Since its establishment, the association has utilised several venues across South Australia:

Norwood Oval (1985–1988)

Thebarton Oval (1989–1996)

Distinctive Homes Hockey Stadium (1997–2009)

Thebarton Oval (2010–2011)

Richmond Oval (from 2012)

Laverton Oval

Currently all games are held at Dry Creek Reserve.

== Current Operations ==
AFSA currently holds a lease agreement with the Port Adelaide Enfield Council and conducts all competition games between September and December at its home ground, Dry Creek Reserve.

The venue includes clubhouse facilities, change rooms, a canteen, and spectator amenities.

== Competitions ==
AFSA operates multiple divisions within its competition structure:

Youth Program – for participants aged 6–12

Junior Program – for participants aged 13–18

Senior Competition – for players aged 18 and over

Several players from the league have represented Australia at national level, while others have progressed to compete in the NCAA college system in the United States, as well as in European and Canadian leagues.

== League members ==
- UNISA Eagles
- Adelaide Uni Hogs
- South City Chiefs
- Port Adelaide Spartans

Past League Teams:

Southern District Oilers ,Brighton Breakers ,Elizabeth Lions

== See also ==
- Gridiron Australia
