= South City Chiefs =

Chiefs
- Full name: South City Chiefs; American Football Club
- Nickname: Chiefs
- Sport: Gridiron
- Founded: 1988
- First season: 1988
- Based in: Adelaide, SA
- Home ground: Marion Sports & Community Club, 262 Sturt Rd Marion, SA 5043
- President: Howard Browne
- Head coach: Michael Terizakis
- 90/91, 05/06, 08/09, 2009, 2010, 2012 & 2016: Runner Up
- Main sponsor: Club Marion

Strip
- Red / White / Blue Trim

The South City Chiefs American Football Club is a sporting club, based in Marion, SA, competing in the South Australian Gridiron Association league.

== History ==
The South City Chiefs were formed in June 1988 by founding members Lyn and Trevor Dean, Bill Maye, Bob McPherson, Glen Michell and Mark Szolga. The club was originally based in the inner southern suburbs of Adelaide South Australia at Forestville/Millswood, to where it is currently at the Marion Sports and Community Club (A.K.A. Club Marion). The Chiefs colours are red, white and blue and the official club logo is an Indian Chief Head.

The Chiefs have had a proud history, with the senior team winning one championship in the 98/99 season and were runners up in 90/91, 05/06, 08/09, 2009, 2010, 2012, 2013, 2014 and 2016.

The Chiefs Juniors have won eight championships: 2007, 2008, 2011, 2013, 2018, 2022, 2023, 2024 going undefeated in all games. We're very proud of our Juniors Program and look forward to them joining us at a Senior level.

We have produced a number of players that have represented South Australia and Australia and we are proud to have the only player (Andrew Hurcombe) in Australian history to run for over 12,000 yards.

Most recently the following Chiefs where inducted into the South Australian Hall of Fame. Andrew Hurcombe, Christopher de Mello, David Sedgwick, Lynn & Dawn Mayman, Shaun McKeough, Trevor & Lyn Dean.

Again, in 2017 we had more Chiefs inducted to the South Australian Hall of Fame:

#23 Paul Welsh

#45 Jacob Moroney

We look forward to the future, as the club has an abundance of veterans complemented by very talented players in their prime and an exciting crop of youngsters.

== See also ==
- American Football Association of South Australian
