= 2025 AdFL season =

2025 premiership season
- Date: 5 April - 20 September
- Premiers: Division 1: Port District; Division 2: Tea Tree Gully; Division 3: Westminster OS; Division 4: Plympton; Division 5: Marion; Division 6: Fitzroy; Division 7: Elizabeth
- Best and fairest: Division 1: Jake Pitman (Golden Grove); Division 2: Mitchell Grigg (Athelstone); Division 3: Mark Rowe (North Haven) & Jock van Kempen (PHOS Camden); Division 4: Nick Hankin (Morphettville Park); Division 5: Fraser Gehirch (Woodville South); Division 6: Mason Pitt (Ingle Farm); Division 7: Brayden Abbott (Elizabeth)
- Leading goalkicker: Division 1: Lachlan Pascoe (Golden Grove); Division 2: Caleb Barton (Athelstone); Division 3: Jake Sutcliffe (Unley Mercedes Jets); Division 4: Luke Paparella (Plympton); Division 5: Steven Clark (Greenacres); Division 6: Dion Doolan (Fitzroy); Division 7: Trent Payne (Brahma Lodge)

The 2025 AdFL season was the 107th season of the Adelaide Footy League (AdFL). The season began on 5 April and concluded on 20 September.

There were 7 Men's Divisions with Seniors and Reserves, as well as 7 C-grade Divisions. There were 6 Women's Divisions, with Seniors and Reserves for Division 1 only.

== Team Changes ==
Division	Promoted to Division	Relegated to Division
Division 1	Rostrevor OC, Salisbury North	N/A
Division 2	Henley, Lockleys	Brighton, Tea Tree Gully
Division 3	Kilburn, Westminster OS	PHOS Camden
Division 4	Colonel Light Gardens, Mitcham	CBC OC
Division 5	Eastern Park, Salisbury	Gaza, Pooraka
Division 6	O'Sullivan Beach/Lonsdale, Para Hills	Blackfriars OS, West Croydon
Division 7	N/A	Central United, Elizabeth

=== Locations ===
Colours indicate club's highest level of competition
Red = Division 1
Orange= Division 2
Yellow = Division 3
Green = Division 4
Light blue = Division 5
Blue = Division 6
Pink= Division 7
Purple = Women only

== Men ==
=== Division 1 ===
Broadview, Glenunga, Golden Grove, Payneham Norwood Union, Port District, Prince Alfred OC, Rostrevor OC, Sacred Heart OC, Salisbury North, St Peters OC

==== Seniors ====
===== Ladder =====
Pos	Team	Pld	W	L	D	PF	PA	PP	Pts
1	Port District	18	14	4	0	1474	1021	59.08	28
2	Golden Grove	18	14	4	0	1690	1191	58.66	28
3	St. Peter's O.C.	18	12	5	1	1427	1089	56.72	25
4	Rostrevor O.C.	18	12	6	0	1363	1075	55.91	24
5	Sacred Heart O.C.	18	12	6	0	1327	1188	52.76	24
6	Salisbury North	18	10	7	1	1478	1293	53.34	21
7	Glenunga	18	6	12	0	1292	1448	47.15	12
8	Payneham Norwood Union	18	5	13	0	1168	1599	42.21	10
9	Prince Alfred O.C.	18	4	14	0	1070	1467	42.18	8
10	Broadview	18	0	18	0	839	1757	32.32	0

source: PlayHQ

===== Finals =====
====== Week 1 ======
	Elimination and Qualifying Finals
Saturday, 30 August (2:00 pm)	Golden Grove 19.6 (120)	def.	St. Peters OC 10.10 (70)	Harpers Field	Report
Saturday, 30 August (2:30 pm)	Rostrevor OC 8.13 (61)	def.	Sacred Heart OC 6.13 (49)	Campbelltown Memorial Oval	Report

====== Semi Finals ======
	Semi Finals
Saturday, 6 September (2:30 pm)	Port District 10.11 (71)	def.	Golden Grove 7.13 (55)	Largs Reserve	Report
Saturday, 6 September (2:15 pm)	St Peters OC 7.12 (54)	def. by	Rostrevor 11.9 (75)	St Peters College	Report

====== Preliminary Final ======
	Preliminary Final
Saturday, 13 September (2:30 pm)	Golden Grove 12.11 (83)	def.	Rostrevor OC 11.7 (73)	Richmond Oval (South Australia)	Report

====== Grand Final ======
Saturday, 20 September (2:30 pm)	Port District	def.	Golden Grove	Norwood Oval	Report
5.3 (33); 8.5 (53); 9.7 (61); 14.8 (92)	Q1; Q2; Q3; Final	1.1 (7); 2.2 (14); 3.4 (22); 6.5 (41)	Umpires: Matt Harris, Frank Manikas; Best on ground medal: #5 Sam Gray (Port District)
Kenneth Karpany 3, Thomas Carter 2, Jordan Dorizzi 2, Harry Dwyer 2, Louis Sharrad 2, Cooper Gaffney, Sam Gray, Tom Gray	Goals	Lachlan Pascoe 3, Michael Cavallaro, Cameron Shenton, Liam Verity
Sam Gray, Joseph Haines, Kenneth Karpany, Louis Sharrad, Liam Modystach	Best	Cameron Shenton, Mitchell Payne, Noah McDonald, Michael Cavallaro, Aidan Thatcher

2025 Men's Team of The Year
B:	Jesse Temme (Glenunga)	Aidan Thatcher (Golden Grove)	Joseph Haines (Port District)
HB:	Cooper Gaffney (Port District)	Darci Best (Rostrevor OC)	Craig Pitt (Prince Alfred OC)
C:	Hunter Window (Sacred Heart OC)		Henry Nelligan (St. Peters OC)
HF:	Joshua Glenn (Golden Grove)	Anthony Hellebaut (Salisbury North)	Malachy Carruthers (St. Peters OC)
F:	Scott Bedford (St. Peters OC)	Lachlan Pascoe (Golden Grove)	Xavier Tranfa (Rostrevor OC)
Foll:	Scott Lycett (Port District)	James Warton (Rostrevor OC)	Jake Pitman (Golden Grove)
Foll:	Jordan O'Brien (Salisbury North)		
Int:	Jacob Russo (Salisbury North)	Matthew Nunn (Payneham NU)	Tyran Hill (Broadview)
Int:	Ethan Moore (Sacred Heart OC)		
Coach:	Joshua Ramsey (Port District)		

==== Reserves ====
===== Ladder =====
Pos	Team	Pld	W	L	D	PF	PA	PP	Pts
1	Sacred Heart O.C.	18	17	1	0	1451	735	66.38	34
2	St. Peter's O.C.	18	14	4	0	1165	836	58.22	28
3	Port District	18	13	5	0	1269	770	62.24	26
4	Golden Grove	18	12	6	0	1287	999	56.30	24
5	Glenunga	18	8	10	0	926	1078	46.21	16
6	Salisbury North	18	7	11	0	992	1097	47.49	14
7	Rostrevor O.C.	18	6	12	0	924	1198	43.54	12
8	Payneham Norwood Union	18	6	12	0	861	1136	43.11	12
9	Prince Alfred O.C.	18	4	14	0	869	1267	40.68	8
10	Broadview	18	3	15	0	764	1392	35.44	6

source:PlayHQ

===== Finals =====
====== Week 1 ======
	Elimination and Qualifying Finals
Saturday, 30 August (12:00 pm)	St. Peter's O.C. 4.8 (32)	def. by	Port District 16.6 (102)	Harpers Field 2	Report
Saturday, 30 August (12:00 pm)	Golden Grove 13.5 (83)	def.	Glenunga 4.7 (31)	Harpers Field 1	Report

====== Semi Finals ======
	Semi Finals
Saturday, 6 September (12:15 pm)	St. Peter's O.C. 6.2 (38)	def. by	Golden Grove 16.11 (107)	Caterer Oval, St Peter's College	Report
Saturday, 6 September (12:30 pm)	Sacred Heart O.C. 10.7 (67)	def. by	Port District 13.5 (83)	Largs Reserve	Report

====== Preliminary Final ======
	Preliminary Final
Saturday, 13 September (12:30 pm)	Sacred Heart O.C. 10.7 (67)	def. by	Golden Grove 11.5 (71)	Richmond Oval	Report

====== Grand Final ======
Grand Final
Saturday, 20 September (12:05 pm)	Port District	def.	Golden Grove	Norwood Oval	Report
3.3 (21); 5.7 (37); 9.10 (64); 10.12 (72)	Q1; Q2; Q3; Final	2.1 (13); 3.3 (21); 3.7 (25); 5.10 (40)	Umpires: Joel DeGilio, Cody Rowston; Best on ground medal: #15 Ollie Siney (Port District)
H. Angove, B. Beswick, A. Charles, M. Iuliano, O. Kilpatrick, J. McKinnon, J. Nolan, D. Passaniti, Z. Rose, J. Thompson	Goals	J. Horskins 3, J. Esposito, J. Stevenson
Oliver Siney, Daniel Passaniti, Dominic Denton, Brodan Hawkins, LOGAN ROSE	Best	Kane Blades, Luke Scott, Benjamin Hockley, Danyle Dobie, Brad Morris

=== Division 2 ===
Adelaide Uni, Athelstone, Brighton Bombers, Flinders Park, Goodwood Saints, Henley, Lockleys, Modbury, Old Ignatians, Tea Tree Gully

==== Seniors ====
===== Ladder =====
Pos	Team	Pld	W	L	D	PF	PA	PP	Pts
1	Tea Tree Gully	18	16	2	0	1682	882	65.60	32
2	Athelstone	18	16	2	0	1920	1028	65.13	32
3	Henley	18	12	6	0	1509	1064	58.65	24
4	Goodwood Saints	18	11	7	0	1559	1228	55.94	22
5	Flinders Park	18	8	10	0	1252	1267	49.70	16
6	Old Ignatians	18	7	11	0	1141	1364	45.55	14
7	Brighton Bombers	18	7	11	0	1095	1403	43.84	14
8	Modbury	18	6	12	0	1061	1551	40.62	12
9	Adelaide University	18	4	14	0	1105	1735	38.91	8
10	Lockleys	18	3	15	0	1078	1880	36.44	6

source: PlayHQ

===== Finals =====
====== Week 1 ======
	Elimination and Qualifying Finals
Saturday, 30 August (2:15 pm)	Athelstone 17.11 (113)	def.	Henley 10.7 (67)	Max Amber Sportsfield	Report
Saturday, 30 August (2:15 pm)	Goodwood Saints 12.10 (82)	def.	Flinders Park 12.9 (81)	Goodwood Oval	Report

====== Semi Finals ======
	Semi Finals
Saturday, 6 September (2:30 pm)	Tea Tree Gully 7.11 (53)	def.	Athelstone 6.11 (47)	Pertaringa Oval	Report
Saturday, 6 September (2:00 pm)	Henley 13.18 (96)	def.	Goodwood Saints 9.13 (67)	Henley Memorial Oval	Report

====== Preliminary Final ======
	Preliminary Final
Saturday, 13 September (2:15 pm)	Athelstone 13.12 (90)	def.	Henley 10.9 (69)	Norwood Oval	Report

====== Grand Final ======
Saturday, 20 September (2:30 pm)	Tea Tree Gully	def.	Athelstone	Richmond Oval (South Australia)	Report
5.1 (31); 11.6 (72); 14.9 (93); 16.13 (109)	Q1; Q2; Q3; Final	4.1 (25); 4.3 (27); 6.4 (40); 7.5 (47)	Best on ground medal: #23 Ryan Spittle (Tea Tree Gully)
B. Latham 5, R. Spittle 4, T. West 2, W. Cansdell, N. Hyde, B. Penney, P. Persinos, J. White	Goals	L. Rander 4, M. Grigg, K. Nurton, C. O'Brien
Ryan Spittle, Christopher Olsson, Brodie Latham, James White, Luke Brown	Best	Luke Rander, Dominic Sangermano, Aaron Stewart, Kane Nurton, Christopher Lodovici

==== Reserves ====
===== Ladder =====
Pos	Team	Pld	W	L	D	PF	PA	PP	Pts
1	Flinders Park	18	15	2	1	1341	715	65.22	31
2	Athelstone	18	13	3	2	1478	763	65.95	28
3	Henley	18	14	4	0	1348	719	65.22	28
4	Goodwood Saints	18	12	6	0	1112	953	53.85	24
5	Tea Tree Gully	18	11	7	0	1209	749	61.75	22
6	Old Ignatians	18	10	8	0	1230	1023	54.59	20
7	Brighton Bombers	18	6	11	1	870	1120	43.72	13
8	Modbury	18	3	15	0	795	1338	37.27	6
9	Adelaide University	18	3	15	0	641	1576	28.91	6
10	Lockleys	18	1	17	0	539	1607	25.12	2

source:PlayHQ

===== Finals =====
====== Week 1 ======
	Elimination and Qualifying Finals
Saturday, 30 August (12:15 pm)	Athelstone 10.12 (72)	def.	Henley 1.10 (16)	Max Amber Sportsfield	Report
Saturday, 30 August (12:15 pm)	Goodwood Saints 7.3 (45)	def. by	Tea Tree Gully 7.9 (51)	Goodwood Oval	Report

====== Semi Finals ======
	Semi Finals
Saturday, 6 September (11:30 am)	Flinders Park 8.11 (59)	def. by	Athelstone 11.10 (76)	Modbury Oval	Report
Saturday, 6 September (12:30 pm)	Henley 9.7 (61)	def.	Tea Tree Gully 6.6 (42)	Pertaringa Oval	Report

====== Preliminary Final ======
	Preliminary Final
Saturday, 13 September (12:15 pm)	Flinders Park 5.3 (33)	def. by	Henley 10.10 (70)	Norwood Oval	Report

====== Grand Final ======
Saturday, 20 September (12:15 pm)	Athelstone	def. by	Henley	Richmond Oval	Report
1.0 (6); 3.2 (20); 5.5 (53); 6.6 (42)	Q1; Q2; Q3; Final	4.4 (28); 6.5 (41); 6.7 (43); 7.11 (53)	Best on ground medal: #2 James Redden (Henley)

=== Division 3 ===
Edwardstown, Hope Valley, Kilburn, North Haven, PHOS Camden, Pembroke OS, Scotch OC, Seaton Ramblers, Unley Mercedes Jets, Westminster OS

==== Seniors ====
===== Ladder =====
Pos	Team	Pld	W	L	D	PF	PA	PP	Pts
1	Westminster O.S.	18	16	2	0	1644	998	62.23	32
2	Unley Mercedes Jets	18	14	4	0	1670	1006	62.41	28
3	Pembroke O.S.	18	12	6	0	1484	937	61.30	24
4	Kilburn	18	11	7	0	1647	1178	58.30	22
5	PHOS Camden	18	11	7	0	1391	1292	51.84	22
6	North Haven	18	10	8	0	1279	1174	52.14	20
7	Seaton Ramblers	18	7	11	0	1158	1448	44.44	14
8	Edwardstown	18	6	12	0	1157	1178	49.55	12
9	Scotch O.C.	18	2	16	0	819	1648	33.20	4
10	Hope Valley	18	1	17	0	971	2361	29.14	2

source: PlayHQ

===== Finals =====
====== Week 1 ======
	Elimination and Qualifying Finals
Saturday, 30 August (2:00 pm)	Unley Mercedes Jets 17.15 (117)	def.	Pembroke OS 9.7 (61)	Kingswood Oval	Report
Saturday, 30 August (2:30 pm)	Kilburn 11.18 (84)	def.	PHOS Camden 3.8 (26)	Blair Athol Reserve	Report

====== Semi Finals ======
	Semi Finals
Saturday, 6 September (2:15 pm)	Westminster OS 12.12 (84)	def.	Unley Mercedes Jets 6.11 (47)	Glandore Oval	Report
Saturday, 6 September (2:15 pm)	Pembroke OS 19.16 (130)	def.	Kilburn 9.7 (61)	Haslam Oval	Report

====== Preliminary Final ======
	Preliminary Final
Saturday, 13 September (2:15 pm)	Unley Mercedes Jets 19.10 (124)	def.	Pembroke OS 9.12 (66)	Campbelltown Memorial Oval	Report

====== Grand Final ======
Saturday, 20 September (2:30 pm)	Westminster OS	def.	Unley Mercedes Jets	Payneham Oval	Report
3.2 (20); 5.3 (33); 6.5 (41); 9.8 (62)	Q1; Q2; Q3; Final	1.1 (7); 1.1 (7); 6.3 (39); 7.8 (50)	Best on ground medal: Aidan Ross (Westminster OS)
N. Leck, C. Blackwell, A. Bradley, R. Drum, T. Edwards, K. Phillips, E. Viles	Goals	A. Khabbaz 2, M. Adams, L. Fox, L. Heaslip, F. Kempe, E. Miller
Aidan Ross, Harrison Lienert, Isaac Willits, riley drum, Nicholas Leck	Best	Luke Heaslip, Lachie Fox, Josh Stevens, Mitch Duval, Rhett Calnan

==== Reserves ====
===== Ladder =====
Pos	Team	Pld	W	L	D	PF	PA	PP	Pts
1	Kilburn	18	16	2	0	1563	801	66.12	32
2	Pembroke O.S.	18	15	3	0	1433	703	67.09	30
3	PHOS Camden	18	13	5	0	1605	876	64.69	26
4	Westminster O.S.	18	13	5	0	1329	814	62.02	26
5	Edwardstown	18	10	8	0	1374	1022	57.35	20
6	Unley Mercedes Jets	18	8	10	0	1132	928	54.95	16
7	Scotch O.C.	18	7	11	0	1072	1138	48.51	14
8	North Haven	18	6	12	0	1018	1245	44.98	12
9	Seaton Ramblers	18	2	16	0	781	1413	35.60	4
10	Hope Valley	18	0	18	0	444	2811	13.64	0

source:PlayHQ

===== Finals =====
====== Week 1 ======
	Elimination and Qualifying Finals
Saturday, 30 August (12:00 pm)	Pembroke O.S. 7.10 (52)	def. by	PHOS Camden 9.5 (59)	Kingswood Oval	Report
Saturday, 30 August (12:30 pm)	Westminster O.S. 10.7 (67)	def. by	Edwardstown 10.10 (70)	Carol Martin Reserve (Blair Athol Reserve)	Report

====== Semi Finals ======
	Semi Finals
Saturday, 6 September (12:15 pm)	Kilburn 7.7 (49)	def. by	PHOS Camden 16.10 (106)	Glandore Oval Reserve	Report
Saturday, 6 September (12:15 pm)	Pembroke O.S. 9.9 (61)	def.	Edwardstown 8.11 (59)	Haslam Oval	Report

====== Preliminary Final ======
	Preliminary Final
Saturday, 13 September (12:15 pm)	Kilburn 5.5 (35)	def. by	Pembroke O.S. 12.13 (85)	Campbelltown Memorial Oval	Report

====== Grand Final ======
Saturday, 20 September (12:15 pm)	PHOS Camden	def.	Pembroke O.S.	Payneham Oval	Report
2.2 (14); 4.6 (30); 5.9 (39); 9.11 (65)	Q1; Q2; Q3; Final	2.0 (12); 3.2 (20); 5.3 (33); 6.4 (40)	Best on ground medal: Fergus Agnew (PHOS Camden)

=== Division 4 ===
CBCOC, Colonel Light Gardens, Gepps Cross, Hectorville, Kenilworth, Mitcham, Morphettville Park, Plympton, SMOSH West Lakes, Walkerville

==== Seniors ====
===== Ladder =====
Pos	Team	Pld	W	L	D	PF	PA	PP	Pts
1	Plympton	18	16	2	0	2068	840	71.11	32
2	Morphettville Park	18	14	4	0	1692	1038	61.98	28
3	Walkerville	18	14	4	0	1702	1119	60.33	28
4	Hectorville	18	12	6	0	1493	1121	57.12	24
5	Colonel Light Gardens	18	8	9	1	1245	1237	50.16	17
6	Mitcham	18	8	9	1	1500	1517	49.72	17
7	Gepps Cross	18	8	10	0	1214	1677	41.99	16
8	Christian Brothers College O.C.	18	7	11	0	1250	1408	47.03	14
9	SMOSH West Lakes	18	1	17	0	888	1998	30.77	2
10	Kenilworth	18	1	17	0	813	1910	29.86	2

source: PlayHQ

===== Finals =====
====== Week 1 ======
	Elimination and Qualifying Finals
Saturday, 30 August (2:30 pm)	Morphettville Park 14.11 (95)	def.	Walkerville 9.12 (66)	Kellett Reserve Oval	Report
Saturday, 30 August (2:00 pm)	Hectorville 13.12 (90)	def.	Colonel Light Gardens 11.8 (74)	Daly Oval	Report

====== Semi Finals ======
	Semi Finals
Saturday, 6 September (2:15 pm)	Plympton 8.7 (55)	def.	Morphettville Park 5.5 (35)	Plympton Oval	Report
Saturday, 6 September (2:15 pm)	Walkerville 18.16 (124)	def.	Hectorville 13.9 (87)	Walkerville	Report

====== Preliminary Final ======
	Preliminary Final
Saturday, 13 September (2:15 pm)	Morphettville Park 6.11 (47)	def. by	Walkerville 9.9 (63)	Blair Athol Reserve	Report

====== Grand Final ======
Saturday, 20 September (2:30 pm)	Plympton	def.	Walkerville	Woodville Oval	Report
1.3 (9); 5.7 (37); 8.9 (57); 11.12 (78)	Q1; Q2; Q3; Final	1.1 (7); 1.2 (8); 3.3 (21); 6.4 (40)	Best on ground medal: Brodie McLeod (Plympton)
Goals	J. Bowden, J. Griffith, M. Hahn, S. Kuerschner, J. Smith
Brodie Mcleod, Stuart Taverner, Harry Phelan, Nathan Caruso, Kieren NELSON	Best	Jordan Smith, Noah Sims, Jack McKay, Jackson Bowden, Zac Elliott

=== Reserves ===
==== Ladder ====
Pos	Team	Pld	W	L	D	PF	PA	PP	Pts
1	Plympton	18	16	2	0	1827	528	77.58	32
2	Walkerville	18	16	2	0	1559	651	70.54	32
3	Mitcham	18	13	5	0	1415	848	62.53	26
4	Colonel Light Gardens	18	12	6	0	1479	1029	58.97	24
5	Morphettville Park	18	10	8	0	1510	1030	59.45	20
6	Hectorville	18	10	8	0	1094	964	53.16	20
7	Gepps Cross	18	5	13	0	788	1423	35.64	10
8	SMOSH West Lakes	18	4	14	0	848	1280	39.85	8
9	Kenilworth	18	2	16	0	647	1639	28.30	4
10	Christian Brothers College O.C.	18	2	16	0	467	2242	17.24	4

source:PlayHQ

==== Finals ====
===== Week 1 =====
	Elimination and Qualifying Finals
Saturday, 30 August (12:00 pm)	Walkerville 3.5 (23)	def. by	Mitcham 8.3 (51)	Daly Oval	Report
Saturday, 30 August (12:30 pm)	Colonel Light Gardens 12.9 (81)	def. by	Morphettville Park 13.5 (83)	Kellett Reserve Oval	Report

===== Semi Finals =====
	Semi Finals
Saturday, 6 September (12:15 pm)	Plympton 13.8 (86)	def.	Mitcham 3.2 (20)	Plympton Oval	Report
Saturday, 6 September (12:15 pm)	Walkerville 8.10 (58)	def.	Morphettville Park 7.10 (52)	Walkerville Oval	Report

===== Preliminary Final =====
	Preliminary Final
Saturday, 13 September (12:15 pm)	Mitcham 5.4 (34)	def. by	Walkerville 14.9 (93)	Carol Martin Reserve (Blair Athol Reserve)	Report

===== Grand Final =====
Saturday, 20 September (12:15 pm)	Plympton	def. by	Walkerville	Woodville Oval	Report
3.3 (21); 3.4 (22); 3.6 (24); 5.7 (37)	Q1; Q2; Q3; Final	3.2 (20); 5.3 (33); 7.5 (47); 10.5 (65)	Best on ground medal: Eddie Grover (Walkerville)

=== Division 5 ===
Eastern Park, Gaza, Greenacres, Marion, Pooraka, Portland, Pulteney, Salisbury, Trinity OS, Woodville South

==== Seniors ====
===== Ladder =====
Pos	Team	Pld	W	L	D	PF	PA	PP	Pts
1	Marion	18	17	1	0	1944	925	67.76	34
2	Eastern Park	18	11	7	0	1715	1609	51.59	22
3	Greenacres	18	11	7	0	1598	1530	51.09	22
4	Pulteney	18	9	9	0	1453	1469	49.73	18
5	Woodville South	18	9	9	0	1453	1514	48.97	18
6	Portland	18	9	9	0	1524	1749	46.56	18
7	Pooraka	18	8	10	0	1368	1511	47.52	16
8	Salisbury	18	6	12	0	1183	1484	44.36	12
9	Gaza	18	5	13	0	1326	1410	48.46	10
10	Trinity O.S.	18	5	13	0	1177	1540	43.32	10

source: PlayHQ

===== Finals =====
====== Week 1 ======
	Elimination and Qualifying Finals
Saturday, 30 August (2:15 pm)	Eastern Park 16.8 (104)	def. by	Greenacres 19.12 (126)	Dwight Reserve	Report
Saturday, 30 August (2:30 pm)	Pulteney 11.9 (75)	def.	Woodville South 4.11 (35)	Morgan Oval (Park 20)	Report

====== Semi Finals ======
	Semi Finals
Saturday, 6 September (2:15 pm)	Marion 12.14 (86)	def.	Greenacres 5.8 (38)	Marion Oval	Report
Saturday, 6 September (2:15 pm)	Eastern Park 14.12 (96)	def. by	Pulteney 19.10 (124)	Dwight Reserve	Report

====== Preliminary Final ======
	Preliminary Final
Saturday, 13 September (2:15 pm)	Greenacres 3.15 (33)	def. by	Pulteney 14.9 (93)	Woodville Oval	Report

====== Grand Final ======
Saturday, 20 September (2:30 pm)	Marion	def.	Pulteney	Blair Athol Reserve	Report
1.5 (11); 3.5 (23); 8.7 (55); 13.10 (88)	Q1; Q2; Q3; Final	5.1 (31); 7.4 (46); 9.4 (58); 12.8 (80)	Best on ground medal: Liam Bunn (Marion)
T. Stewart 4, L. Bunn 2, H. Elkins 2, W. Cavallo, L. Eichner, C. Fleetwood, H. LeFournour, J. Mitchell	Goals	J. Aish 6, T. Currie 2, L. Kennewell 2, L. Jarvis, A. Taverner
Liam Bunn, Hudson Elkins, Tim Stewart, adam beaumont, Seb Fairlie	Best	Joel Aish, Nicholas Worrall, Matthew Weistra, Jayden Rea, Cameron Kelly

=== Reserves ===
==== Ladder ====
Pos	Team	Pld	W	L	D	PF	PA	PP	Pts
1	Gaza	18	14	4	0	1681	783	68.22	28
2	Woodville South	18	14	4	0	1642	843	66.08	28
3	Marion	18	12	6	0	1490	867	63.22	24
4	Trinity O.S.	18	12	6	0	1541	901	63.10	24
5	Salisbury	18	12	6	0	1406	881	61.48	24
6	Greenacres	18	10	8	0	1531	859	64.06	20
7	Pulteney	18	7	10	1	1299	1140	53.26	15
8	Eastern Park	18	5	12	1	1152	1129	50.50	11
9	Pooraka	16	3	13	0	571	2210	20.53	6
10	Portland	18	0	18	0	175	2875	5.74	0

source:PlayHQ

==== Finals ====
===== Week 1 =====
	Elimination and Qualifying Finals
Saturday, 30 August (12:15 pm)	Trinity O.S. 8.5 (53)	def. by	Salisbury 10.4 (64)	Dwight Reserve	Report
Saturday, 30 August (12:30 pm)	Woodville South 12.7 (79)	def.	Marion 7.13 (55)	Morgan Oval (Park 20)	Report

===== Semi Finals =====
	Semi Finals
Saturday, 6 September (12:15 pm)	Gaza 4.10 (34)	def. by	Woodville South 9.10 (64)	Dwight Reserve	Report
Saturday, 6 September (12:15 pm)	Marion 10.4 (64)	def.	Salisbury 7.5 (47)	Marion Oval	Report

===== Preliminary Final =====
	Preliminary Final
Saturday, 13 September (12:15 pm)	Gaza 5.13 (43)	def.	Marion 5.5 (35)	Woodville Oval	Report

===== Grand Final =====
Saturday, 20 September (12:15 pm)	Woodville South	def. by	Gaza	Carol Martin Reserve (Blair Athol Reserve)	Report
1.0 (6); 2.1 (13); 2.1 (13); 2.2 (14)	Q1; Q2; Q3; Final	3.2 (20); 6.3 (39); 6.6 (42); 7.9 (51)	Best on ground medal: Jack Sandland (Gaza)

=== Division 6 ===
Adelaide Lutheran, Blackfriars OS, Fitzroy, Houghton Districts, Ingle Farm, OSB Lonsdale, Para Hills, Rosewater, St Paul's OS, West Croydon

==== Seniors ====
===== Ladder =====
Pos	Team	Pld	W	L	D	PF	PA	PP	Pts
1	Fitzroy	18	15	3	0	1876	1019	64.80	30
2	St. Paul's O.S.	18	14	4	0	1714	1391	55.20	28
3	Ingle Farm	18	13	5	0	1816	1205	60.11	26
4	Rosewater	18	11	7	0	1599	1183	57.48	22
5	O'Sullivan Beach-Lonsdale	18	10	8	0	1714	1257	57.69	20
6	Para Hills	18	9	9	0	1541	1313	53.99	18
7	Houghton Districts	18	9	9	0	1647	1608	50.60	18
8	Blackfriars O.S.	18	7	11	0	1290	1413	47.72	14
9	Adelaide Lutheran	18	1	17	0	880	1986	30.70	2
10	West Croydon	18	1	17	0	823	2525	24.58	2

source: PlayHQ

===== Finals =====
====== Week 1 ======
	Elimination and Qualifying Finals
Saturday, 30 August (2:30 pm)	St Paul's OS 7.11 (53)	def. by	Ingle Farm 10.14 (74)	St Pauls College	Report
Saturday, 30 August (2:15 pm)	Rosewater 11.12 (78)	def.	O'Sullivan Beach Lonsdale 9.10 (64)	Eric Sutton Reserve	Report

====== Semi Finals ======
	Semi Finals
Saturday, 6 September (2:15 pm)	Fitzroy 14.13 (97)	def.	Ingle Farm 10.14 (74)	Sam Johnson Sportsground	Report
Saturday, 6 September (2:15 pm)	St Paul's OS 13.14 (92)	def.	Rosewater 10.12 (72)	St Pauls College	Report

====== Preliminary Final ======
	Preliminary Final
Saturday, 13 September (2:15 pm)	Ingle Farm 6.15 (51)	def. by	St Paul's OS 8.14 (62)	Elizabeth Oval	Report

====== Grand Final ======
Saturday, 20 September (2:30 pm)	Fitzroy	def.	St Paul's OS	Campbelltown Memorial Oval	Report
2.6 (18); 9.11 (65); 11.11 (77); 15.15 (105)	Q1; Q2; Q3; Final	0.1 (1); 3.3 (21); 6.7 (43); 8.9 (57)	Best on ground medal: Ronald Carbine Jnr (Fitzroy)
D. Richardson 6, H. Wanganeen 3, K. Garrett 2, L. Diorio, D. Doolan, J. Henry, T. Pickett-Carbine	Goals	L. Falco 2, N. Papaioannou 2, A. Wills-Dwair 2, T. Ahern, J. Wurfel
Ronald Carbine Jnr, Dylan Richardson, Aiden Rogers, Lucas Diorio, Trasen Pickett-Carbine	Best	Riley Henriks, Jordan Wurfel, Jake Buckerfield, Tyson Soulsby, Glenn Gibbs

=== Reserves ===
==== Ladder ====
Pos	Team	Pld	W	L	D	PF	PA	PP	Pts
1	Rosewater	18	16	2	0	1641	680	70.70	32
2	Adelaide Lutheran	18	15	2	1	1691	798	67.94	31
3	Ingle Farm	18	13	5	0	1548	885	63.63	26
4	Houghton Districts	18	13	5	0	1501	871	63.28	26
5	St. Paul's O.S.	18	9	9	0	1226	1138	51.86	18
6	Fitzroy	18	7	10	1	1295	1225	51.39	15
7	Para Hills	18	7	11	0	1108	1265	46.69	14
8	Blackfriars O.S.	17	6	11	0	1026	1468	41.14	12
9	O'Sullivan Beach-Lonsdale	18	2	16	0	900	1545	36.81	4
10	West Croydon	18	1	17	0	477	2538	15.82	2

source:PlayHQ

==== Finals ====
===== Week 1 =====
	Elimination and Qualifying Finals
Saturday, 30 August (12:00 pm)	Adelaide Lutheran 7.10 (52)	def.	Ingle Farm 3.6 (24)	Eric Sutton Reserve	Report
Saturday, 30 August (12:15 pm)	Houghton Districts 16.11 (107)	def.	St. Paul's O.S. 6.7 (43)	St. Paul's College	Report

===== Semi Finals =====
	Semi Finals
Saturday, 6 September (12:15 pm)	Rosewater 9.10 (64)	def.	Adelaide Lutheran 7.10 (52)	St. Paul's College	Report
Saturday, 6 September (12:15 pm)	Ingle Farm 8.6 (54)	def. by	Houghton Districts 10.5 (65)	Sam Johnson Sportsground	Report

===== Preliminary Final =====
	Preliminary Final
Saturday, 13 September (12:15 pm)	Adelaide Lutheran 7.10 (52)	def.	Houghton Districts 5.4 (34)	Elizabeth Oval	Report

===== Grand Final =====
Saturday, 20 September (12:15 pm)	Rosewater	def. by	Adelaide Lutheran	Campbelltown Memorial Oval	Report
1.3 (9); 3.4 (22); 5.5 (35); 6.6 (42)	Q1; Q2; Q3; Final	2.3 (15); 2.6 (18); 3.9 (27); 6.11 (47)	Best on ground medal: Joe French (Adelaide Lutheran)

=== Division 7 ===
Brahma Lodge, Central United, Elizabeth, Flinders Uni, Hackham, Mawson Lakes, Mitchell Park, Smithfield

==== Seniors ====
===== Ladder =====
Pos	Team	Pld	W	L	D	PF	PA	PP	Pts
1	Elizabeth	17	17	0	0	2435	573	80.85	34
2	Brahma Lodge	17	11	6	0	1312	1175	52.75	22
3	Central United	17	10	7	0	1695	1324	56.14	20
4	Hackham	17	8	9	0	1312	1276	50.69	16
5	Mitchell Park	17	7	10	0	1476	1520	49.26	14
6	Mawson Lakes	17	7	10	0	1121	1416	44.18	14
7	Flinders University	17	7	10	0	1040	1888	35.51	14
8	Smithfield	17	1	16	0	1061	2280	31.75	2

source: PlayHQ

===== Finals =====
====== Week 1 ======
	Elimination and Qualifying Finals
Saturday, 30 August (2:30 pm)	Brahma Lodge 5.8 (38)	def. by	Central United 10.12 (72)	Brahma Lodge Oval	Report
Saturday, 30 August (1:45 pm)	Hackham 15.9 (99)	def.	Mitchell Park 10.10 (70)	Hackham Oval	Report

====== Semi Finals ======
	Semi Finals
Saturday, 6 September (2:15 pm)	Elizabeth 29.15 (189)	def.	Central United 3.10 (28)	Argana Park	Report
Saturday, 6 September (2:15 pm)	Brahma Lodge 8.15 (63)	def.	Hackham 6.16 (52)	Brahma Lodge	Report

====== Preliminary Final ======
	Preliminary Final
Saturday, 13 September (2:00 pm)	Central United 15.15 (105)	def.	Brahma Lodge 7.5 (47)	Payneham Oval	Report

====== Grand Final ======
Saturday, 20 September (2:30 pm)	Elizabeth	def.	Central United	Elizabeth Oval	Report
5.2 (32); 8.4 (52); 13.12 (90); 15.16 (106)	Q1; Q2; Q3; Final	1.2 (8); 3.5 (23); 6.5 (41); 8.7 (55)	Best on ground medal: Braden Owen (Elizabeth)
P. Dempsey 3, J. Upton 3, B. Ewing 2, B. Owen 2, K. Shaw 2, B. Abbott 1, A. Hann 1, A. Stephenson 1	Goals	K. Silvy 2, T. Baron 1, S. Burns 1, S. Eeles 1, T. Hugo-Davis 1, J. Palmer 1, J. Symons 1
Braden Owen, Adam Hann, Jarrod Upton, Peter Dempsey, Jai Bunker	Best	Rory McMillan, Steven Burns, Jack Veness, Thomas Woods, Jake Gevers

=== Reserves ===
==== Ladder ====
Pos	Team	Pld	W	L	D	PF	PA	PP	Pts
1	Hackham	17	14	3	0	1292	783	62.27	28
2	Brahma Lodge	17	11	6	0	1342	918	59.38	22
3	Mawson Lakes	17	10	7	0	1190	871	57.74	20
4	Central United	17	10	7	0	1247	1014	55.15	20
5	Mitchell Park	17	9	8	0	1201	963	55.50	18
6	Elizabeth	17	9	8	0	1164	989	54.06	18
7	Flinders University	17	4	13	0	780	1276	37.94	8
8	Smithfield	17	1	16	0	545	1947	21.87	2

source:PlayHQ

==== Finals ====
===== Week 1 =====
	Elimination and Qualifying Finals
Saturday, 30 August (11:45 am)	Central United 10.8 (68)	def.	Mitchell Park 6.13 (49)	Hackham Oval	Report
Saturday, 30 August (12:30 pm)	Brahma Lodge 9.6 (60)	def.	Mawson Lakes 7.12 (54)	Brahma Lodge Oval	Report

===== Semi Finals =====
	Semi Finals
Saturday, 6 September (12:15 pm)	Hackham 11.12 (78)	def.	Brahma Lodge 6.10 (46)	Brahma Lodge Oval	Report
Saturday, 6 September (12:15 pm)	Mawson Lakes 8.7 (55)	def. by	Central United 10.10 (70)	Argana Park	Report

===== Preliminary Final =====
	Preliminary Final
Saturday, 13 September (12:00 pm)	Brahma Lodge 10.12 (72)	def.	Central United 4.12 (36)	Payneham Oval	Report

===== Grand Final =====
Saturday, 20 September (12:15 pm)	Hackham	def. by	Brahma Lodge	Elizabeth Oval	Report
2.1 (13); 4.2 (26); 5.4 (34); 6.6 (42)	Q1; Q2; Q3; Final	1.2 (8); 3.3 (21); 5.6 (36); 7.10 (52)	Best on ground medal: Adam Burckett (Brahma Lodge)

=== C Grade ===
==== C1 ====
===== Ladder =====
Pos	Team	Pld	W	L	D	PF	PA	PP	Pts
1	Sacred Heart O.C.	18	17	1	0	2131	583	78.52	34
2	Port District	18	15	3	0	2279	490	82.30	30
3	Prince Alfred O.C.	18	15	3	0	1914	605	75.98	30
4	Rostrevor O.C.	18	12	6	0	1663	840	66.44	24
5	Golden Grove	18	11	7	0	1650	975	62.86	22
6	Payneham Norwood Union	18	7	11	0	1086	1953	35.74	14
7	St. Peter's O.C.	18	5	13	0	944	1441	39.58	10
8	Glenunga	17	5	12	0	806	1891	29.89	10
9	Broadview	17	3	14	0	653	1808	26.53	6
10	Salisbury North	18	0	18	0	232	2772	7.72	0

source:PlayHQ

===== Finals =====
====== Week 1 ======
	Elimination and Qualifying Finals
Saturday, 30 August (10:00 am)	Rostrevor O.C. 7.6 (48)	def. by	Golden Grove 9.8 (62)	Harpers Field 2	Report
Saturday, 30 August (10:30 am)	Port District 6.7 (43)	def. by	Prince Alfred O.C. 8.6 (54)	Campbelltown Memorial Oval	Report

====== Semi Finals ======
	Semi Finals
Saturday, 6 September (10:00 am)	Sacred Heart O.C. 7.7 (49)	def.	Prince Alfred O.C. 4.13 (37)	Sacred Heart Senior School Oval (Marcellin War Memorial Oval)	Report
Saturday, 6 September (10:30 am)	Port District 6.4 (40)	def.	Golden Grove 2.4 (16)	Largs Reserve	Report

====== Preliminary Final ======
	Preliminary Final
Saturday, 13 September (10:30 am)	Prince Alfred O.C. 3.14 (32)	def. by	Port District 5.9 (39)	Richmond Oval	Report

====== Grand Final ======
Saturday, 20 September (9:50 am)	Sacred Heart O.C.	def.	Port District	Norwood Oval	Report
6.9 (45)	Q1; Q2; Q3; Final	3.11 (29)	Umpires: Chris Rasch, Tony Symons; Best on ground medal: #21 Charlie Jones (Sacred Heart OC)

==== C2 ====
===== Ladder =====
Pos	Team	Pld	W	L	D	PF	PA	PP	Pts
1	Goodwood Saints	18	15	3	0	1480	761	66.04	30
2	Henley	18	12	6	0	1312	980	57.24	24
3	Modbury	18	11	7	0	1267	1031	55.13	22
4	Tea Tree Gully	18	10	7	1	1217	940	56.42	21
5	Adelaide University	18	9	8	1	1289	1089	54.21	19
6	Old Ignatians	18	9	8	1	1119	1011	52.54	19
7	Athelstone	18	9	9	0	975	1019	48.90	18
8	Flinders Park	18	8	10	0	1007	1060	48.72	16
9	Lockleys	18	4	14	0	966	1339	41.91	8
10	Brighton Bombers	18	1	16	1	564	1966	22.29	3

source:PlayHQ

===== Finals =====
====== Week 1 ======
	Elimination and Qualifying Finals
Saturday, 30 August (10:15 am)	Henley 9.8 (62)	def. by	Modbury 14.7 (91)	Max Amber Sportsfield	Report
Saturday, 30 August (10:15 am)	Tea Tree Gully 9.7 (61)	def.	Adelaide University 7.12 (54)	Goodwood Oval	Report

====== Semi Finals ======
	Semi Finals
Saturday, 6 September (10:00 am)	Goodwood Saints 10.11 (71)	def.	Modbury 5.1 (31)	Henley Memorial Oval	Report
Saturday, 6 September (10:30 am)	Henley 12.3 (75)	def.	Tea Tree Gully 9.5 (59)	Pertaringa Oval	Report

====== Preliminary Final ======
	Preliminary Final
Saturday, 13 September (10:15 am)	Modbury 8.6 (54)	def. by	Henley 8.9 (57)	Norwood Oval	Report

====== Grand Final ======
Saturday, 20 September (10:00 am)	Goodwood Saints	def.	Henley	Richmond Oval	Report
3.3 (21); 5.8 (38); 8.13 (61); 12.15 (87)	Q1; Q2; Q3; Final	0.1 (1); 1.2 (8); 2.2 (14); 4.3 (27)	Best on ground medal: #10 Jayden Geddie (Goodwood Saints)

==== C3 ====
===== Ladder =====
Pos	Team	Pld	W	L	D	PF	PA	PP	Pts
1	PHOS Camden	18	17	1	0	1728	573	75.10	34
2	Pembroke O.S.	18	16	2	0	1562	646	70.74	32
3	Edwardstown	18	12	6	0	1306	879	59.77	24
4	Scotch O.C.	17	10	7	0	1064	1136	48.36	20
5	Kilburn	18	9	9	0	1060	1170	47.53	18
6	Westminster O.S.	18	8	10	0	1076	911	54.15	16
7	Seaton Ramblers	18	7	11	0	1036	1286	44.62	14
8	Unley Mercedes Jets	16	6	10	0	674	1417	32.23	12
9	Hope Valley	16	4	12	0	1008	1602	38.62	8
10	North Haven	16	1	15	0	726	1620	30.95	2

source:PlayHQ

===== Finals =====
====== Week 1 ======
	Elimination and Qualifying Finals
Saturday, 30 August (10:00 am)	Pembroke O.S. 13.6 (84)	def.	Edwardstown 6.7 (43)	Kingswood Oval	Report
Saturday, 30 August (10:30 am)	Scotch O.C. 8.12 (60)	def. by	Kilburn 11.13 (79)	Carol Martin Reserve (Blair Athol Reserve)	Report

====== Semi Finals ======
	Semi Finals
Saturday, 6 September (10:00 am)	PHOS Camden 11.10 (76)	def.	Pembroke O.S. 5.5 (35)	Haslam Oval	Report
Saturday, 6 September (10:15 am)	Edwardstown 7.5 (47)	def.	Kilburn 4.9 (33)	Glandore Oval Reserve	Report

====== Preliminary Final ======
	Preliminary Final
Saturday, 13 September (10:15 am)	Pembroke O.S. 16.15 (111)	def.	Edwardstown 4.4 (28)	Campbelltown Memorial Oval	Report

====== Grand Final ======
Saturday, 20 September (10:00 am)	PHOS Camden	def.	Pembroke O.S.	Payneham Oval	Report
2.4 (16); 5.5 (35); 7.10 (52); 11.11 (77)	Q1; Q2; Q3; Final	1.1 (7); 2.3 (15); 3.3 (21); 4.7 (31)	Best on ground medal: Max Scott (PHOS Camden)

==== C4 ====
===== Ladder =====
Pos	Team	Pld	W	L	D	PF	PA	PP	Pts
1	Plympton	18	17	1	0	2213	502	81.51	34
2	Walkerville	18	17	1	0	1881	460	80.35	34
3	Colonel Light Gardens	18	13	5	0	1543	672	69.66	26
4	SMOSH West Lakes	18	12	6	0	1695	723	70.10	24
5	Mitcham	18	10	8	0	1123	1159	49.21	20
6	Morphettville Park	17	8	9	0	1080	1183	47.72	16
7	Hectorville	18	7	11	0	734	1510	32.71	14
8	Gepps Cross	18	3	15	0	662	2068	24.25	6
9	Kenilworth	7	2	5	0	385	859	30.95	4
10	Christian Brothers College O.C.	14	1	13	0	192	2372	7.49	2

source:PlayHQ

===== Finals =====
====== Week 1 ======
	Elimination and Qualifying Finals
Saturday, 30 August (10:00 am)	SMOSH West Lakes 10.10 (70)	def.	Mitcham 6.3 (39)	Daly Oval	Report
Saturday, 30 August (10:30 am)	Walkerville 9.11 (65)	def.	Colonel Light Gardens 3.2 (20)	Kellett Reserve Oval	Report

====== Semi Finals ======
	Semi Finals
Saturday, 6 September (10:15 am)	Plympton 9.9 (63)	def.	Walkerville 4.11 (35)	Plympton Oval	Report
Saturday, 6 September (12:00 pm)	Colonel Light Gardens 5.8 (38)	def. by	SMOSH West Lakes 12.5 (77)	Mortlock Park	Report

====== Preliminary Final ======
	Preliminary Final
Saturday, 13 September (10:15 am)	Walkerville 7.6 (48)	def. by	SMOSH West Lakes 7.7 (49)	Carol Martin Reserve (Blair Athol Reserve)	Report

====== Grand Final ======
Saturday, 20 September (10:00 am)	Plympton	def.	SMOSH West Lakes	Woodville Oval	Report
2.2 (14); 5.3 (33); 6.4 (40); 7.7 (49)	Q1; Q2; Q3; Final	1.1 (7); 2.1 (13); 3.2 (20); 3.8 (26)	Best on ground medal: Reece Oliver (Plympton)

==== C5 ====
===== Ladder =====
Pos	Team	Pld	W	L	D	PF	PA	PP	Pts
1	Prince Alfred O.C.	18	16	2	0	1738	546	76.09	32
2	Henley	18	16	2	0	2055	646	76.08	32
3	Adelaide University	18	15	3	0	1862	724	72.00	30
4	Eastern Park	18	11	7	0	1469	1081	57.61	22
5	Marion	18	10	8	0	1246	1192	51.11	20
6	Gaza	17	9	8	0	957	1137	45.70	18
7	Woodville South	18	5	13	0	864	1485	36.78	10
8	Greenacres	18	4	14	0	748	1889	28.37	8
9	Trinity O.S.	17	3	14	0	656	1489	30.58	6
10	Salisbury	18	1	17	0	537	1943	21.65	2

source:PlayHQ

===== Finals =====
====== Week 1 ======
	Elimination and Qualifying Finals
Saturday, 30 August (10:00 am)	Eastern Park 9.6 (60)	def. by	Marion 10.12 (72)	Dwight Reserve	Report
Saturday, 30 August (12:15 pm)	Henley 10.11 (71)	def.	Adelaide University 4.2 (26)	Henley Memorial Oval	Report

====== Semi Finals ======
	Semi Finals
Saturday, 6 September (10:15 am)	Adelaide University 12.8 (80)	def.	Marion 9.5 (59)	Marion Oval	Report
Saturday, 6 September (12:00 pm)	Prince Alfred O.C. 15.5 (95)	def.	Henley 7.10 (52)	Henley Memorial Oval	Report

====== Preliminary Final ======
	Preliminary Final
Saturday, 13 September (10:15 am)	Henley 10.6 (66)	def.	Adelaide University 4.7 (31)	Woodville Oval	Report

====== Grand Final ======
Saturday, 20 September (10:00 am)	Prince Alfred O.C.	def. by	Henley	Carol Martin Reserve (Blair Athol Reserve)	Report
4.2 (26); 7.2 (44); 10.3 (63); 11.5 (71)	Q1; Q2; Q3; Final	0.1 (1); 2.3 (15); 6.4 (40); 11.7 (73)	Best on ground medal: Tim Broadbent (Henley)

==== C6 ====
===== Ladder =====
Pos	Team	Pld	W	L	D	PF	PA	PP	Pts
1	Golden Grove	18	18	0	0	3247	257	92.67	36
2	Adelaide University	18	16	2	0	2394	528	81.93	32
3	Modbury	18	13	5	0	1806	625	74.29	26
4	Lockleys	18	12	6	0	1185	893	57.03	24
5	Adelaide Lutheran	18	9	9	0	1464	1394	51.22	18
6	Rosewater	17	8	9	0	866	1660	34.28	16
7	Houghton Districts	18	7	11	0	1038	1364	43.21	14
8	Ingle Farm	18	5	13	0	721	1927	27.23	10
9	Para Hills	17	2	15	0	481	2026	19.19	4
10	Eastern Park	18	0	18	0	333	2861	10.43	0

source:PlayHQ

===== Finals =====
====== Week 1 ======
	Elimination and Qualifying Finals
Saturday, 30 August (10:00 am)	Adelaide University 15.15 (105)	def.	Modbury 4.4 (28)	University Oval (Park 12)	Report
Saturday, 30 August (10:00 am)	Lockleys 13.5 (83)	def.	Adelaide Lutheran 5.6 (36)	Eric Sutton Reserve	Report

====== Semi Finals ======
	Semi Finals
Saturday, 6 September (10:15 am)	Golden Grove 5.8 (38)	def. by	Adelaide University 9.12 (66)	Harpers Field 1	Report
Saturday, 6 September (1:30 pm)	Modbury 10.9 (69)	def.	Lockleys 8.10 (58)	Modbury Oval	Report

====== Preliminary Final ======
	Preliminary Final
Saturday, 13 September (10:15 am)	Golden Grove 18.10 (118)	def.	Modbury 2.3 (15)	Elizabeth Oval	Report

====== Grand Final ======
Saturday, 20 September (10:00 am)	Adelaide University	def. by	Golden Grove	Campbelltown Memorial Oval	Report
2.6 (18); 2.8 (20); 4.9 (33); 6.12 (48)	Q1; Q2; Q3; Final	0.1 (1); 4.1 (25); 6.3 (39); 10.4 (64)	Best on ground medal: Todd Sheppard (Golden Grove)

==== C7 ====
===== Ladder =====
Pos	Team	Pld	W	L	D	PF	PA	PP	Pts
1	Tea Tree Gully	16	15	1	0	1382	585	70.26	30
2	Adelaide University Black	16	12	4	0	1105	686	61.70	24
3	Sacred Heart O.C.	15	10	5	0	966	578	62.56	20
4	Rostrevor O.C.	16	9	7	0	991	821	54.69	18
5	Port District	16	8	8	0	810	784	50.82	16
6	Prince Alfred O.C.	16	7	9	0	856	769	52.68	14
7	Walkerville	16	7	9	0	922	934	49.68	14
8	Adelaide University Grey	16	4	12	0	765	1205	38.83	8
9	Golden Grove	16	0	16	0	378	1813	17.25	0

source:PlayHQ

===== Finals =====
====== Week 1 ======
	Elimination and Qualifying Finals
Saturday, 30 August (12:00 pm)	Adelaide University Black 4.10 (34)	def.	Sacred Heart O.C. 3.7 (25)	University Oval (Park 12)	Report
Saturday, 30 August (12:30 pm)	Rostrevor O.C. 5.6 (36)	def.	Port District 4.6 (30)	Campbelltown Memorial Oval	Report

====== Semi Finals ======
	Semi Finals
Saturday, 6 September (10:15 am)	Sacred Heart O.C. 10.6 (66)	def.	Rostrevor O.C. 9.5 (59)	Walkerville Oval	Report
Saturday, 6 September (12:00 pm)	Tea Tree Gully 7.7 (49)	def.	Adelaide University Black 5.8 (38)	Bulkana Oval	Report

====== Preliminary Final ======
	Preliminary Final
Saturday, 13 September (10:00 am)	Adelaide University Black 5.11 (41)	def. by	Sacred Heart O.C. 7.10 (52)	Payneham Oval	Report

====== Grand Final ======
Saturday, 20 September (10:00 am)	Tea Tree Gully	def.	Sacred Heart O.C.	Walkerville Oval	Report
0.4 (4); 3.7 (25); 5.10 (40); 7.13 (55)	Q1; Q2; Q3; Final	1.3 (9); 2.5 (17); 2.7 (19); 3.8 (26)	Best on ground medal: Daniel Golding (Tea Tree Gully)

== Women ==
=== Division 1 ===
==== Seniors ====
===== Ladder =====
Pos	Team	Pld	W	L	D	PF	PA	PP	Pts
1	Payneham NU	14	13	0	1	895	423	67.90	27
2	Henley	14	9	4	1	930	407	69.55	19
3	Morphettville Park	14	8	6	0	748	512	59.36	16
4	Broadview	14	7	7	0	455	519	46.71	14
5	Happy Valley	14	7	7	0	393	597	39.69	14
6	Goodwood Saints	14	6	8	0	540	465	53.73	12
7	Hectorville	14	5	9	0	479	659	42.09	10
8	Golden Grove	14	0	14	0	215	1073	16.69	0

source:PlayHQ

===== Finals =====
====== Semi Finals ======
	Semi Finals
Saturday, 9 August (3:15 pm)	Payneham Norwood Union 6.4 (40)	def.	Henley 4.3 (27)	Payneham Oval	Report
Saturday, 9 August (3:15 pm)	Morphettville Park 9.9 (63)	def.	Broadview 4.4 (28)	Kellett Reserve Oval	Report

====== Preliminary Final ======
	Preliminary Final
Saturday, 16 August (3:50 pm)	Henley 4.3 (27)	def. by	Morphettville Park 6.2 (38)	Price Memorial Oval	Report

====== Grand Final ======
Saturday, 23 August (3:50 pm)	Payneham Norwood Union	def. by	Morphettville Park	St Marys Park	Report
1.3 (9); 3.5 (23); 3.5 (23); 3.5 (23)	Q1; Q2; Q3; Final	0.0 (0); 1.1 (7); 4.2 (26); 5.3 (33)	Best on ground medal: Jiarna Zerella (Morphettville Park)

==== Reserves ====
===== Ladder =====
Pos	Team	Pld	W	L	D	Forf	PF	PA	PP	Pts
1	Henley	14	11	3	0	0	636	324	66.25	22
2	Goodwood Saints	14	10	4	0	0	880	253	77.66	20
3	Morphettville Park	14	10	4	0	0	658	420	61.03	20
4	Broadview	14	9	5	0	0	620	271	69.58	18
5	Happy Valley	14	7	7	0	0	486	488	49.89	14
6	Payneham NU	14	6	8	0	0	443	497	47.12	12
7	Hectorville	14	2	7	0	5	268	697	27.77	4
8	Golden Grove	14	1	10	0	3	68	1109	5.77	2

source:PlayHQ

===== Finals =====
====== Semi Finals ======
	Semi Finals
Saturday, 9 August (1:30 pm)	Henley 3.9 (27)	def. by	Goodwood Saints 5.3 (33)	Payneham Oval	Report
Saturday, 9 August (1:30 pm)	Morphettville Park 5.4 (34)	def. by	Broadview 6.1 (37)	Kellett Reserve Oval	Report

====== Preliminary Final ======
	Preliminary Final
Saturday, 16 August (1:55 pm)	Henley 4.6 (30)	def.	Broadview 3.2 (20)	Price Memorial Oval	Report

====== Grand Final ======
Saturday, 23 August (1:55 pm)	Goodwood Saints	def.	Henley	St Marys Park	Report
0.3 (3); 2.4 (16); 4.5 (29); 5.7 (37)	Q1; Q2; Q3; Final	0.2 (2); 2.3 (15); 2.7 (19); 2.8 (20)	Best on ground medal: Brianna Pullen (Goodwood Saints)

=== Division 2 ===
==== Ladder ====
Pos	Team	Pld	W	L	D	Forf	PF	PA	PP	Pts
1	Angle Vale	14	14	0	0	0	876	298	74.61	28
2	Tea Tree Gully	14	11	3	0	0	1006	345	74.46	22
3	Hope Valley	14	9	5	0	0	508	392	56.44	18
4	Old Ignatians	14	7	7	0	0	410	494	45.35	14
5	Eastern Park	14	5	9	0	0	456	504	47.50	10
6	Brighton Bombers	14	5	8	0	1	380	628	37.69	10
7	Lockleys	14	4	10	0	0	349	655	34.76	8
8	SMOSH West Lakes	14	1	12	0	1	216	885	19.61	2

source:PlayHQ

==== Finals ====
===== Semi Finals =====
	Semi Finals
Saturday, 9 August (3:15 pm)	Angle Vale 6.12 (48)	def. by	Tea Tree Gully 6.13 (49)	Angle Vale Oval #2	Report
Saturday, 9 August (3:15 pm)	Hope Valley 4.7 (31)	def.	Old Ignatians 4.5 (29)	Hope Valley Sporting Club	Report

===== Preliminary Final =====
	Preliminary Final
Saturday, 16 August (11:50 am)	Angle Vale 7.9 (51)	def.	Hope Valley 5.5 (35)	Price Memorial Oval	Report

===== Grand Final =====
Saturday, 23 August (11:55 am)	Tea Tree Gully	def. by	Angle Vale	St Marys Park	Report
1.1 (7); 1.2 (8); 1.3 (9); 3.5 (23)	Q1; Q2; Q3; Final	3.1 (19); 5.1 (31); 5.3 (33); 7.4 (46)	Best on ground medal: Charlotte Maurits (Angle Vale)

=== Division 3 ===
==== Ladder ====
Pos	Team	Pld	W	L	D	PF	PA	PP	Pts
1	Port District	14	13	1	0	755	170	81.62	26
2	Mitcham	14	10	3	1	613	185	76.81	21
3	Westminster OS	14	9	5	0	472	275	63.18	18
4	Pembroke OS	14	7	6	1	476	393	54.77	15
5	Scotch OC	14	6	8	0	340	500	40.47	12
6	Flinders Park	14	5	9	0	277	492	36.02	10
7	Adelaide University	14	4	10	0	297	517	36.48	8
8	Pulteney	14	1	13	0	134	832	13.87	2

source:PlayHQ

==== Finals ====
===== Semi Finals =====
	Semi Finals
Saturday, 2 August (1:15 pm)	Port District 9.13 (67)	def.	Mitcham 3.0 (18)	Largs Reserve	Report
Saturday, 2 August (4:45 pm)	Westminster OS 3.5 (23)	def. by	Pembroke OS 5.2 (32)	Glandore Oval Reserve	Report

===== Preliminary Final =====
	Preliminary Final
Saturday, 9 August (1:40 pm)	Mitcham 3.3 (21)	def. by	Pembroke O.S. 4.3 (27)	Carol Martin Reserve (Blair Athol Reserve)	Report

===== Grand Final =====
Saturday, 16 August (1:50 pm)	Port District	def.	Pembroke O.S.	St Marys Park	Report
3.3 (15); 4.4 (28); 5.7 (37); 7.8 (50)	Q1; Q2; Q3; Final	0.0 (0); 0.2 (2); 0.4 (4); 1.4 (10)	Best on ground medal: Ruby Matthews (Port District)

=== Division 4 ===
==== Ladder ====
Pos	Team	Pld	W	L	D	Forf	PF	PA	PP	Pts
1	Modbury	14	14	0	0	0	660	134	83.12	28
2	Glenunga	14	9	5	0	0	432	385	52.87	18
3	Athelstone	14	8	6	0	0	399	326	55.03	16
4	Gepps Cross	14	7	7	0	0	418	365	53.38	14
5	Loreto OS	14	6	7	1	0	357	374	48.83	13
6	Woodville South	14	5	8	1	0	248	280	46.96	11
7	Edwardstown	14	5	9	0	0	297	480	38.22	10
8	Salisbury	14	1	10	0	3	229	696	24.75	2

source:PlayHQ

==== Finals ====
===== Semi Finals =====
	Semi Finals
Saturday, 2 August (3:15 pm)	Athelstone 4.1 (25)	def.	Gepps Cross 3.5 (23)	Max Amber Sportsfield	Report
Saturday, 2 August (4:45 pm)	Modbury 3.5 (23)	def.	Glenunga 2.4 (16)	Modbury Oval	Report

===== Preliminary Final =====
	Preliminary Final
Saturday, 9 August (11:50 am)	Glenunga 4.6 (30)	def.	Athelstone 2.4 (16)	Carol Martin Reserve (Blair Athol Reserve)	Report

===== Grand Final =====
Saturday, 16 August (11:55 am)	Modbury	def. by	Glenunga	St Marys Park	Report
0.1 (1); 1.1 (7); 2.3 (15); 2.3 (15)	Q1; Q2; Q3; Final	2.0 (12); 4.1 (25); 5.1 (31); 7.2 (44)	Best on ground medal: Riley Carroll (Glenunga)

=== Division 5 ===
==== Ladder ====
Pos	Team	Pld	W	L	D	Forf	PF	PA	PP	Pts
1	Salisbury North	14	13	1	0	0	1104	195	84.98	26
2	Kilburn	14	12	2	0	0	913	289	75.95	24
3	Marion	14	9	5	0	0	743	259	74.15	18
4	St Peters OCW	14	8	6	0	0	679	279	70.87	16
5	Houghton Districts	14	8	6	0	0	637	366	63.50	16
6	North Haven	14	4	9	0	1	461	688	40.12	8
7	O'Sullivan Beach Lonsdale	14	1	13	0	0	135	1290	9.47	2
8	Adelaide University	14	1	13	0	0	85	1391	5.75	2

source:PlayHQ

==== Finals ====
===== Semi Finals =====
	Semi Finals
Saturday, 2 August (10:15 am)	Salisbury North 8.4 (52)	def.	Kilburn 2.6 (18)	Salisbury North Oval	Report
Saturday, 2 August (3:15 pm)	Marion 4.5 (29)	def.	St Peters OCW 2.1 (13)	Marion Oval	Report

===== Preliminary Final =====
	Preliminary Final
Saturday, 9 August (10:00 am)	Kilburn 3.7 (25)	def. by	Marion 4.2 (26)	Carol Martin Reserve (Blair Athol Reserve)	Report

===== Grand Final =====
Saturday, 16 August (10:00 am)	Salisbury North	def. by	Marion	St Marys Park	Report
0.1 (1); 0.3 (3); 0.7 (7); 2.7 (19)	Q1; Q2; Q3; Final	1.0 (6); 2.1 (13); 2.1 (13); 3.3 (21)	Best on ground medal: Sienna Perry (Marion)

=== Division 6 ===
==== Ladder ====
Pos	Team	Pld	W	L	D	Forf	PF	PA	PP	Pts
1	Seaton Ramblers	15	14	1	0	0	1493	144	91.20	28
2	Tea Tree Gully	15	13	2	0	0	1026	196	83.96	26
3	Ingle Farm	15	8	7	0	0	539	493	52.22	16
4	Hope Valley	15	6	8	1	0	641	654	49.49	13
5	West Croydon	15	2	11	1	1	373	833	30.92	5
6	Smithfield	15	1	14	0	0	74	1826	3.89	2

source:PlayHQ

==== Finals ====
===== Semi Finals =====
	Semi Finals
Saturday, 9 August (4:45 pm)	Seaton Ramblers 5.4 (34)	def.	Tea Tree Gully 4.5 (29)	Pedlar Reserve	Report
Saturday, 9 August (4:45 pm)	Ingle Farm 5.10 (40)	def.	Hope Valley 2.3 (15)	Rowe Park	Report

===== Preliminary Final =====
	Preliminary Final
Saturday, 16 August (10:00 am)	Tea Tree Gully 14.11 (95)	def.	Ingle Farm 1.0 (6)	Price Memorial Oval	Report

===== Grand Final =====
Saturday, 23 August (10:00 am)	Seaton Ramblers	def.	Tea Tree Gully	St Marys Park	Report
2.0 (12); 2.0 (12); 4.0 (24); 4.1 (25)	Q1; Q2; Q3; Final	1.2 (8); 1.4 (10); 2.4 (16); 2.5 (17)	Best on ground medal: Kate Walsh (Seaton Ramblers)

== Medalists ==
=== Men's ===
==== Best and Fairest ====
- M1 - BTR Excavations | Keith Sims Medal - Jake Pitman - Golden Grove 35 Votes
- M1R - BTR Excavations | EA Davoren Medal - Declan Tomney - Golden Grove 18 Votes
- M2 - Breakthrough Mental Health | FA Bloch Medal - Mitchell Grigg - Athelstone 34 Votes
- M2R - Breakthrough Mental Health | G Palasis Medal - Austinn Horner - Old Ignatians 20 Votes
- M3 - 9News | GS Heard Medal - Mark Rowe North Haven & Jock van Kempen - PHOS Camden 24 Votes
- M3R - 9News | DG McKay Medal - Paul Wootton - Scotch OC 17 Votes
- M4 - Police Credit Union | JW Schulz Medal - Nick Hankin - Morphettville Park 18 Votes
- M4R - Police Credit Union | RB Lambert Medal - Josh Denton - Hectorville 19 Votes
- M5 - FIVEAA | JB Dicker Medal - Fraser Gehirch - Woodville South 27 Votes
- M5R - FIVEAA | JR Wilson Medal - Elijah Luke - Marion - 25 Votes
- M6 - Vili's | AG Bert Medal - Mason Pitt - Ingle Farm 27 Votes
- M6R - Vili's | AEC Treloar Medal - Benjamin De Gasperis - Adelaide Lutheran 20 Votes
- M7 - Adelaide Footy League | RA Stennett Medal - Brayden Abbott - Elizabeth 24 Votes
- M7R - Adelaide Footy League | FJ Monten Medal - Dale Johns - Hackham 23 Votes
- C1 - Adelaide Footy League | P Collins Medal - Luke Nicholls - Port District 32 Votes
- C2 - Adelaide Footy League | JA Burchell Medal - Jack Carter - Goodwood Saints 29 Votes
- C3 - Adelaide Footy League | CG Tideman Medal - Martin Neddermeyer - Edwardstown 17 Votes
- C4 - Adelaide Footy League | HD Naylor Medal - Cory Selfe - Plympton 18 Votes
- C5 - Adelaide Footy League | CC Sando Medal - Matthew Paul - Eastern Park 30 Votes
- C6 - Adelaide Footy League | HV Millard Medal - Todd Sheppard - Golden Grove 31 Votes
- C7 - Adelaide Footy League | RH Elix Medal - Dylan Thredgold - Adelaide University 26 Votes

==== Leading Goal Kickers ====
- Men's Division 1 | Drew Lister Medal - Lachlan Pascoe - Golden Grove 84 Goals
- League Goal Kicker M1R - Joel Horskins - Golden Grove 59 Goals
- League Goal Kicker M2 - Caleb Barton - Athelstone 55 Goals
- League Goal Kicker M2R - Nathan Richards - Athelstone 49 Goals
- League Goal Kicker M3 - Jake Sutcliffe - Unley Mercedes Jets 57 Goals
- League Goal Kicker M3R - Harry Parker - Edwardstown 56 Goals
- League Goal Kicker M4 - Luke Paparella - Plympton 70 Goals
- League Goal Kicker M4R - Paul McInerney - Colonel Light Gardens 64 Goals
- League Goal Kicker M5 - Steven Clark - Greenacres 52 Goals
- League Goal Kicker M5R - Matthew Perry - Trinity OS 75 Goals
- League Goal Kicker M6 - Dion Doolan - Fitzroy 96 Goals
- League Goal Kicker M6R - Jaiya Warrior - Adelaide Lutheran 78 Goals
- League Goal Kicker M7 - Trent Payne - Brahma Lodge 79 Goals
- League Goal Kicker M7R - Shane Cosenza - Central United 49 Goals
- League Goal Kicker C1 -Will Dalwood - Prince Alfred OC 64 Goals
- League Goal Kicker C2 - Dylan Bingos - Modbury 77 Goals
- League Goal Kicker C3 - Matthew Moore - Kilburn & Colby Whitbourne - Scotch OC 44 Goals
- League Goal Kicker C4 - Giorgio Kastrappi - Plympton 68 Goals
- League Goal Kicker C5 - Joel Chapman - Henley 126 Goals
- League Goal Kicker C6 - Dashiell Ravlich - Golden Grove 101 Goals
- League Goal Kicker C7 - Mitch Lloyd - Adelaide University 33 Goals

=== Women's ===
==== Best and Fairest ====
- Gina Dutschke Medal - Jessica Chyer, Goodwood Saints - 22 Votes
- Louise Crowe Medal - Emma Cornish, Payneham NU - 18 Votes
- Catherine Mulvihill Medal - Brittany Perry, Angle Vale - 23 Votes
- Narelle Smith Medal - Indira Panelli, Pembroke OS - 21 Votes
- Stephen Baxter & Jules Smith Medal - Nicole Hall, Athelstone - 20 Votes
- Anni Sergent Medal - Talana Knaggs, Kilburn - 28 Votes
- Georgi Iley Medal - Rhiannan Murphy, Seaton Ramblers - 18 Votes

==== Leading Goal Kicker ====
- Trudy Glazbrook Award - Women's Division 1 - Teagan Dunbar, Henley - 47 Goals
- League Leading Goal Kicker - Women's Division 1 Reserves - Elizabeth Probyn-Shingles, Morphettville Park - 18 Goals
- League Leading Goal Kicker - Women's Division 2 - Tamara Clapton, Angle Vale & Laura Mitchell, Tea Tree Gully - 35 Goals
- League Leading Goal Kicker - Women's Division 3 - Jasmine White, Port District - 24 Goals
- League Leading Goal Kicker - Women's Division 4 - Kia Bascomb, Glenunga - 20 Goals
- League Leading Goal Kicker - Women's Division 5 - Madeline-Rose Agius, Kilburn - 63 Goals
- Leagues Leading Goal Kicker - Women's Division 6 - Grace Grierson, Seaton Ramblers - 56 Goals
