= Milton Wong =

Canadian businessman, financier and philanthropist

Milton Wong OC OBC (born February 12, 1939 - December 31, 2011) was a Canadian businessman, financier, and philanthropist. Wong became one of Canada's most prolific money managers and was the Chairman of HSBC. Many of his peers consider him one of the most innovative and tenacious financiers of his generation. Combined with his business acumen, Milton mentored and enabled an entire community of businessmen and investors.

== Early life ==
Milton was born to Chinese immigrant parents Wong Kung Lai and Wong Chu Man. He was the second-youngest of a family with four daughters and five sons. His father started a shop which was named Modernize Tailors in 1913. He was raised in Vancouver's Chinatown. After graduating from high school at Vancouver Technical Secondary, he went on to study economics and political science at the University of British Columbia.

== Career ==
Wong's foray in finance started after graduating from University in 1963 and together with co-founder Doug Knight, Milton started his financial management company, M.K. Wong and associates. He later sold this firm to HSBC and became the head of HSBC Asset Manager (Canada) Ltd where took on managing billions of dollars within global assets.

In addition to being a financier, he was an active venture capitalist and invested in numerous start-ups which include Nurse Next Door (a home care company) and Perceptronix Medical Inc. (a company that specializes in early cancer detection testing). He was a significant shareholder and director in a local medical imaging technology company named ALI Technologies Ltd, which was acquired by McKesson Corporation for $530 million US on May 3, 2002. After the acquisition closed, ALI Technologies was renamed to McKesson Medical Imaging and maintains a significant R&D presence in Richmond, British Columbia.

In 1986, Milton collaborated with Murray Leith Sr and Michael Ryan to fund and establish the Portfolio Management Foundation program at UBC's Sauder School of Business. This program is now home to the largest student run investment portfolio in Canada (valued at over 9 million CAD) and has many notable alumni and mentors. Its influence on Vancouver's investment community has been significant.

He was also a friend of former B.C. premier Mike Harcourt and a driving force behind Vancouver's Science World and a broker of British Columbia's first modern-day land claims agreement.

Wong had Christian roots.

== Boards and memberships ==
In addition to being active in the world of Canadian finance, he has been on the boards of a myriad of organizations.

- Simon Fraser University Chancellor
- BC Cancer Foundation Co-chair
- co-founder of the International Dragon Boat Festival
- Salvation Army
- YMCA
- Canadian Red Cross
- David Suzuki Foundation
- Vancouver General Hospital
- Founder of the Laurier Institution
- Rio Tinto Alcan
- Genome British Columbia

== Death and legacy ==
He died on December 31, 2011, at the age of 72 from complications of pancreatic cancer.

He won the Freedom of the City Award of Vancouver for his outstanding contributions to the city. He has been honoured with numerous awards such as the Order of Canada and the Order of British Columbia and has been commended by numerous Vancouver politicians such as Gregor Robertson and B.C. NDP Leader Adrian Dix for his business acumen, financial impact, civic leadership, and contributions to Canada. In 2013 the Canadian International Dragon Boat Festival Society established the Milton K Wong Legacy Project to honour his memory.

Two years prior to his death, a theatre was named in his and his wife's honour, Fei and Milton Wong Experimental Theatre.
