= 1986 Montreal Alouettes season =

Canadian football team season

- Owner: Charles Bronfman
- Head coach: Gary Durchik
- Home stadium: Olympic Stadium

Results
- Record: 4–14
- Division place: 3rd, East
- Playoffs: Did not qualify

Uniform

The 1986 Montreal Alouettes finished the season in third place in the East Division with a 4–14 record and missed the playoffs. The Montreal Concordes were renamed the Alouettes following the 1985 season to mark the 40th anniversary of the founding of the Alouettes. The Montreal Alouettes were facing severe financial difficulty, having lost close to $15 million between 1982–86, so having the CFL give a fourth place team in one division a playoff spot if its record was better than the third-place finisher in the other division was a disaster. When Calgary got a playoff spot over the Alouettes, the lost revenue for a playoff game further crippled the franchise, contributing to its demise shortly after the start of the following season. General manager Joe Galat left the team prior to the end of the season to take a position with the B.C. Lions on August 1. President Norm Kimball took over as GM until the end of the season

== Preseason ==
Game	Date	Opponent	Results		Venue	Attendance
Game	Date	Opponent	Score	Record	Venue	Attendance
A	June 7	vs. Winnipeg Blue Bombers	L 10–35	0–1	Canada Games Stadium	11,463
B	June 12	vs. Ottawa Rough Riders	W 17–16	1–1	Olympic Stadium	8,675
C	June 17	vs. Toronto Argonauts	L 13–24	1–2	Exhibition Stadium	21,780

== Regular season ==
=== Standings ===
East Division
Pos	Team	Pld	W	L	T	PF	PA	PD	Pts	Div	Stk
1	Toronto Argonauts (C, Q)	18	10	8	0	417	441	−24	20	7–1	W2
2	Hamilton Tiger-Cats (Q)	18	9	8	1	405	366	39	19	5–3	W3
3	Montreal Alouettes (Q)	18	4	14	0	320	500	−180	8	1–7	L3
4	Ottawa Rough Riders	18	3	14	1	346	514	−168	7	3–5	L1

Source: "1986 Regular Season Standings". Archived from the original on 2009-10-16.
(C) First round bye; (Q) Qualified for playoffs

=== Schedule ===
Week	Game	Date	Opponent	Results		Venue	Attendance
Week	Game	Date	Opponent	Score	Record	Venue	Attendance
1	1	June 27	at Ottawa Rough Riders	L 11–20	0–1	Lansdowne Park	17,409
2	2	July 4	vs. Toronto Argonauts	L 12–20	0–2	Olympic Stadium	13,281
3	Bye						
4	3	July 19	vs. BC Lions	L 20–27	0–3	BC Place	42,158
5	4	July 24	at Ottawa Rough Riders	W 29–28	1–3	Lansdowne Park	20,156
6	5	Aug 1	vs. Winnipeg Blue Bombers	L 10–37	1–4	Olympic Stadium	14,127
7	6	Aug 7	vs. Edmonton Eskimos	W 17–6	2–4	Olympic Stadium	11,203
8	7	Aug 14	at Calgary Stampeders	L 10–21	2–5	McMahon Stadium	28,063
9	8	Aug 21	vs. Hamilton Tiger-Cats	L 23–28	2–6	Olympic Stadium	12,158
10	9	Sept 1	at Hamilton Tiger-Cats	L 7–42	2–7	Ivor Wynne Stadium	23,185
11	10	Sept 7	at Edmonton Eskimos	L 22–37	2–8	Commonwealth Stadium	37,332
12	11	Sept 12	vs. Ottawa Rough Riders	L 28–29	2–9	Olympic Stadium	11,399
13	12	Sept 18	vs. Winnipeg Blue Bombers	L 14–39	2–10	Winnipeg Stadium	21,899
14	Bye						
15	13	Oct 5	BC Lions	W 28–15	3–10	Olympic Stadium	5,200
16	14	Oct 12	at Saskatchewan Roughriders	L 11–29	3–11	Taylor Field	17,422
17	15	Oct 17	vs. Saskatchewan Roughriders	W 29–28	4–11	Olympic Stadium	9,204
18	16	Oct 24	vs. Calgary Stampeders	L 12–32	4–12	Olympic Stadium	9,665
19	17	Nov 2	at Toronto Argonauts	L 21–25	4–13	Exhibition Stadium	23,488
20	18	Nov 9	vs. Toronto Argonauts	L 16–37	4–14	Olympic Stadium	9,045

== Roster ==
1986 Montreal Alouettes final roster
Quarterbacks: 7 Joe Barnes; 8 Steve Calabria; 14 Walter Lewis; 6 Brian Ransom; 10 Mark Stevens; Running backs: 22 Wes Cooper; 36 Shawn Faulkner; 21 Tony Johns; 26 Ricky Porter; Wide receivers: 86 Gerald Alphin; 24 Steve Bird; 89 Ray Caissie; 88 Jacques Chapdelaine; 82 Greg Holmes; 80 James Hood; 85 Gill Stegall	Offensive linemen: 67 Trevor Bowles T; 66 Lloyd Fairbanks T; 58 Glenn Keeble C; 51 Bob Lubig G; 61 Kevin Molle G; 60 Blake Nill T; 65 Mike Palumbo G/C; 55 Scott Robson G; Defensive linemen: 81 Sandy Armstrong DE; 69 Rayford Cooks DT; 68 Glenn Kulka DE; 90 Tony Lawson DT; 99 Steve Raquet DE; 70 Doug Scott DT; 71 Brett Williams DT; Special teams: 3 Zenon Andrusyshyn K/P	Linebackers: 75 Ken Ciancone; 43 Will Cokeley; 37 Matt Finlay; 42 Paul Gray; 77 Mark Hopkins; 72 Lemont Jeffers; 31 William Mitchell; Defensive backs: 2 Steve Benjamin; 24 Wayne Cadogan; 23 Dave Daniels; 15 Brian Dudley; 32 Terry Irvin; 4 David Martin; 27 Rick Ryan; 29 Jeff Treftlin; Injured list: 79 Nick Arakgi TE; 5 Roy Kurtz K/P; Italics indicate American players
