= 1986 Toronto Argonauts season =

CFL team season

- Head coach: Bob O'Billovich
- Home stadium: Exhibition Stadium

Results
- Record: 10–8
- Division place: 1st, East
- Playoffs: Lost East Final

Uniform

The 1986 Toronto Argonauts finished in first place in the East Division with a record of 10 wins and 8 losses. The Argos' appeared in the Eastern playoffs losing to the Hamilton Tiger Cats 42–25.

== Offseason ==
The Toronto Argonauts drafted the following players in the 1986 CFL draft.

Round	Pick	Player	Position	School
1	3	Markus Koch	DE	Boise State
2	10	Donohue Grant	DB	Simon Fraser
2	12	Dwayne Derban	LB	UBC
3	22	Mike Siroishka	WR	Calgary
5	39	Brian Cluff	G	Guelph
6	48	Bruce Elliot	LB	Western Ontario
7	57	Eric Jensen	T	York
8	66	Scott Del Zotto	WR	York

== Roster ==
1986 Toronto Argonauts final roster
Quarterbacks: 14 Tim Cowan; 7 Condredge Holloway; 9 Norman Gibbs; 10 Jeff Joslin; 6 J. C. Watts; Running backs: 34 Bob Bronk; 37 Warren Hudson; 33 William Miller; 20 Cedric Minter; Receivers: 72 Keith Baker; 1 Steve Cox; 23 Dwight Edwards; 80 Ken Joiner; 16 David Pearson; 25 Paul Pearson; 12 Mike Siroishka; 74 Darrell Smith; 30 Geoff Townsend; 85 Chris Woods	Offensive linemen: 54 Tony Antunovic G; 56 Jeff Arp G; 69 Dan Ferrone G; 63 Jim Kardash T; 68 Dave Kirzinger G; 51 Mark Napolitan C; 65 Dan Petschenig G; 66 Kelvin Pruenster T; 67 Chris Schultz T; 61 Willie Thomas C; 75 Jeff Watson G/C; Defensive linemen: 99 Jearld Baylis DT; 57 Steve Del Col DE; 64 Brad Fojtik DT; 77 Rodney Harding DE; 90 Marlon Jones DE; 76 Mark Seale DT	Linebackers: 73 David Marshall; 36 Don Moen; 58 Gary Moten; 32 Willie Pless; 35 Dan Rashovich; Defensive backs: 2 Carl Brazley; 21 Marcellus Greene; 20 Donnohue Grant; 15 Cliff Hewitt; 3 Darrell Moir; 18 Jerry Nash; 17 Kerry Parker; 28 Paul Tripoli; 13 Darrell Wilson; Special teams: 4 Lance Chomyc K; 8 Hank Ilesic P/K; Injured list: 50 Tom Trifaux T; Italics indicate International player

== Regular season ==
=== Standings ===
East Division
Pos	Team	Pld	W	L	T	PF	PA	PD	Pts	Div	Stk
1	Toronto Argonauts (Q)	18	10	8	0	417	441	−24	20	7–1	W2
2	Hamilton Tiger-Cats (Q)	18	9	8	1	405	366	39	19	5–3	W3
3	Montreal Alouettes	18	4	14	0	320	500	−180	8	1–7	L3
4	Ottawa Rough Riders	18	3	14	1	346	514	−168	7	3–5	L1

Source: "1986 Regular Season Standings". Archived from the original on 2009-10-16.
(Q) Qualified for playoffs

=== Schedule ===
Week	Game	Date	Opponent	Results		Venue	Attendance
Week	Game	Date	Opponent	Score	Record	Venue	Attendance
1	1	June 26	vs. Hamilton Tiger-Cats	W 21–20	1–0	Exhibition Stadium	24,100
2	2	July 4	at Montreal Alouettes	W 20–12	2–0	Olympic Stadium	13,281
3	3	July 11	at BC Lions	L 17–28	2–1	BC Place Stadium	42,326
4	4	July 17	vs. Saskatchewan Roughriders	L 14–21	2–2	Exhibition Stadium	23,500
5	5	July 26	at Saskatchewan Roughriders	W 27–17	3–2	Taylor Field	18,307
6	6	Aug 1	at Edmonton Eskimos	W 35–34	4–2	Commonwealth Stadium	38,672
7	7	Aug 8	vs. Calgary Stampeders	L 26–31	4–3	Exhibition Stadium	25,752
8	Bye						
9	8	Aug 23	vs. Edmonton Eskimos	W 26–20	5–3	Exhibition Stadium	28,833
10	9	Aug 29	at Ottawa Rough Riders	W 25–12	6–3	Lansdowne Park	22,357
11	10	Sept 7	vs. Hamilton Tiger-Cats	W 25–23	7–3	Exhibition Stadium	28,531
12	11	Sept 14	vs. BC Lions	L 24–34	7–4	Exhibition Stadium	29,714
13	Bye						
14	12	Sept 28	vs. Winnipeg Blue Bombers	L 16–26	7–5	Exhibition Stadium	25,300
15	13	Oct 5	at Winnipeg Blue Bombers	L 20–48	7–6	Winnipeg Stadium	28,356
16	14	Oct 13	at Calgary Stampeders	L 14–37	7–7	McMahon Stadium	25,939
17	15	Oct 19	vs. Ottawa Rough Riders	W 35–21	8–7	Exhibition Stadium	27,320
18	16	Oct 26†	at Hamilton Tiger-Cats	L 10–20	8–8	Ivor Wynne Stadium	24,430
19	17	Nov 2	vs. Montreal Alouettes	W 25–21	9–8	Exhibition Stadium	23,488
20	18	Nov 9	at Montreal Alouettes	W 37–16	10–8	Olympic Stadium	9,045

- † Canadian Football Hall of Fame Game

== Postseason ==
Round	Date	Opponent	Results		Venue	Attendance
Round	Date	Opponent	Score	Record	Venue	Attendance
East Final Game 1	Sun, Nov 16	at Hamilton Tiger-Cats	W 31–17	1–0	Ivor Wynne Stadium	23,126
East Final Game 2	Sun, Nov 23	vs. Hamilton Tiger-Cats	L 25–42	1–1	Exhibition Stadium	32,041
