= Tyrone Crews =

American gridiron football player (born 1956)

Profile
- Position: Linebacker

Personal information
- Born: June 17, 1956 (age 70); New York, New York, U.S.

Career information
- College: Kansas State University

Career history
- 1981–87: BC Lions

Awards and highlights
- Grey Cup champion (1985); Tom Pate Memorial Award (1986)

Tyrone Crews (born June 17, 1956) is a former linebacker in the Canadian Football League (CFL) playing seven seasons with the BC Lions.

A graduate of Kansas State University, Crews joined the Leos in 1981 and was part of their 1985 Grey Cup championship team. He was winner of the Tom Pate Memorial Award for community service. In 2010, he was elected into the BC Lions Wall of Fame.

In 1995, Crews became head coach of the Vancouver Trojans and coached them for six seasons, compiling a 14 win, 42 loss and 2 tie record. In 1997, he was named BCFC Coach of the Year and was winner of the Gord Currie CJFL Coach of the Year Award.
