= Adelaide University Eagles American Football Club =

Australian sporting club

- Full name: Adelaide University Eagles; American Football Club
- Sport: Gridiron (American football)
- Founded: 1986
- League: South Australian Gridiron Association
- Home ground: University Parade, Mawson Lakes SA 5095
- Colours: Black/White/Purple
- Championships: 2012, 2014, 2021

The Adelaide University Eagles American Football Club is a sporting club competing in the American Football South Australia league. The organisation was created in 1986 and was originally known as the Adelaide Eagles American Football Club until 2014, when a partnership was made with the University of South Australia which led to the club becoming the UniSA Eagles. The merger of UniSA and the University of Adelaide created Adelaide University in 2026, at which time the club became known as the Adelaide University American Football Club.

== History ==
The Eagles first fielded a team in the 1986/87 season, which was the second year of competitive gridiron in South Australia. The Eagles' first game ended with a 14–12 win over the Port Adelaide Magpies, On the way to a berth in the play-offs, they scored a historic 54–0 win over the Southern Long Horns (known as the Southern Districts Oilers). During the 1990s, the club struggled with a shortage of players, coaches and general support. Although they had limited on-field success, the UNISA Eagles maintained their competitive spirit and strong sense of pride.

The 2000–2001 season was the beginning of a period of re-building for the Eagles. The player roster was boosted by the recruitment of a number of experienced players from other clubs, talented rookies, and significantly, some players from the United States of America. One of these players, Lloyd Gubler returned to play and coach for the Eagles for three consecutive seasons.

In 2001–2002, the Eagles had a record number of registered players for any one team in the league. They made it into the play-offs, and 13 Eagles players were selected for the League's All Star team. The club also saw the return of Eagle Cheerleaders and a growing number of sponsors and supporters.

Although the 2003–04 season was seen as having lackluster on-field performance, the Eagles were still one of the strongest clubs in the league for player numbers and growing strength in supporters. With their strong presence around the league they had many players represent the state at the National Championships held in Adelaide. Along with state representation, they also had two players represent Australia.

The 2024–2025 season was widely considered disappointing for the Senior Team, struggling throughout the season. The Junior Team, however, went undefeated in the regular season and went to a Grand Final, facing the South City Chiefs in a rivalry game. The result of the game was 36-44 and ended in double overtime, ending with an interception in the end zone.

== See also ==
- South Australian Gridiron Association
