= Calvin Adams =

American gridiron football player (born 1962)

Profile
- Position: Cornerback

Personal information
- Born: January 4, 1962 (age 64); Guilford County, North Carolina, U.S.
- Listed height: 5 ft 9 in (1.75 m)
- Listed weight: 170 lb (77 kg)

Career information
- High school: High Point HS
- College: East Carolina

Career history
- 1986: Hamilton Tiger-Cats

Awards and highlights
- Grey Cup champion (1986)

Calvin Adams (born January 4, 1962) is a Canadian football cornerback who played for the Hamilton Tiger-Cats of the Canadian Football League (CFL). He played in four games for the Tiger-Cats during the 1986 season, catching two interceptions and fumbling once. He became a Grey Cup champion that year after the Tiger-Cats defeated the Edmonton Eskimos 39–15 in the 74th Grey Cup.
