= Vancouver Trojans =

Canadian Junior Football team

- Sport: Canadian football
- Founded: 1974
- League: Canadian Junior Football League
- Division: BC Football Conference
- Based in: Vancouver, British Columbia
- Stadium: Burnaby Lake Sports Complex; Swangard Stadium
- Colours: Scarlet red, old gold, and white

The Vancouver Trojans were a Canadian Junior Football team based in Vancouver, British Columbia. The Trojans play in the eight-team B.C. Football Conference, which itself is part of the Canadian Junior Football League (CJFL) and competes annually for the national title known as the Canadian Bowl. The Trojans were founded in 1974, and won the Canadian Bowl as CJFL champions in 1982.

The team was originally called the Renfrew Trojans, but changed their name in 1993. The Trojans practice facility is at Renfrew Park in Vancouver, but play their games in neighbouring Burnaby at either the Burnaby Lake Sports Complex or at Swangard Stadium.

In 2009 the Vancouver Trojans Junior Football team entered non-playing status with the BC Football Conference. There is currently no plan to revive the team.

== Coach ==
Former B.C. Lions running back Cory Philpot

Former B.C. Lions linebacker Tyrone Crews
