= 1986 Ottawa Rough Riders season =

Canadian football team season

- Head coach: Joe Moss; Tom Dimitroff (Interim)
- Home stadium: Lansdowne Park

Results
- Record: 3–14–1
- Division place: 4th, East
- Playoffs: did not qualify

Uniform

The 1986 Ottawa Rough Riders finished the season in fourth place in the East Division with a 3–14–1 record, thereby failing to qualify for the post-season. Head coach Joe Moss was fired after posting a 3–10 record and replaced with Director of Player Personnel Tom Dimitroff on an interim basis.

== Offseason ==
=== CFL draft ===
Rd	Pick	Player	Position	School
1	4	Michael Schad	OT	Queen's
2	13	Bob Harding	TE	York
3	23	Chuck Wust	DB	Acadia
4	29	Rob Taylor	DE/OL	Toronto
4	31	Angus Donnelly	DE	Carleton
6	49	Richard Storey	DL	McMaster
7	58	Devon Hanson	DB	York
8	67	Andre Van Vugt	OT	Windsor

=== Preseason ===
Date	Opponent	Final Score	Result	Attendance	Record
June 12	at Montreal Alouettes	17–16	Loss	8,675	0–1
June 18	vs. Hamilton Tiger-Cats	23–16	Win	13,621	1–1

== Regular season ==
=== Standings ===
East Division
Pos	Team	Pld	W	L	T	PF	PA	PD	Pts	Div	Stk
1	Toronto Argonauts (Q)	18	10	8	0	417	441	−24	20	7–1	W2
2	Hamilton Tiger-Cats (Q)	18	9	8	1	405	366	39	19	5–3	W3
3	Montreal Alouettes	18	4	14	0	320	500	−180	8	1–7	L3
4	Ottawa Rough Riders	18	3	14	1	346	514	−168	7	3–5	L1

Source: "1986 Regular Season Standings". Archived from the original on 2009-10-16.
(Q) Qualified for playoffs

=== Schedule ===
Week	Date	Opponent	Score	Result	Attendance	Record
1	June 27	vs. Montreal Alouettes	20–11	Win	17,409	1–0
2	July 3	at Hamilton Tiger-Cats	18–2	Win	15,877	2–0
3	July 10	vs. Calgary Stampeders	31–15	Loss	21,266	2–1
4	July 17	at Edmonton Eskimos	49–39	Loss	33,922	2–2
5	July 24	vs. Montreal Alouettes	29–28	Loss	20,156	2–3
6	Aug 4	at Saskatchewan Roughriders	33–14	Loss	18,024	2–4
7	Bye					
8	Aug 15	vs. BC Lions	25–19	Loss	23,177	2–5
9	Aug 22	at Winnipeg Blue Bombers	46–14	Loss	23,918	2–6
10	Aug 29	vs. Toronto Argonauts	25–12	Loss	22,347	2–7
11	Sept 4	at BC Lions	40–10	Loss	40,091	2–8
12	Sept 12	at Montreal Alouettes	29–28	Win	11,399	3–8
13	Sept 20	vs. Saskatchewan Roughriders	34–24	Loss	15,390	3–9
14	Sept 27	vs. Hamilton Tiger-Cats	31–11	Loss	17,192	3–10
15	Oct 3	at Calgary Stampeders	41–21	Loss	26,074	3–11
16	Oct 13	vs. Winnipeg Blue Bombers	18–16	Loss	13,572	3–12
17	Oct 19	at Toronto Argonauts	35–21	Loss	27,320	3–13
18	Bye					
19	Nov 1	vs. Edmonton Eskimos	16–16	Tie	13,936	3–13–1
20	Nov 7	at Hamilton Tiger-Cats	20–19	Loss	14,101	3–14–1

== Roster ==
1986 Ottawa Rough Riders final roster
Quarterbacks: 16 Tom Burgess; 8 Todd Dillon; 7 Gilbert Renfroe; Running backs: 23 Brad Calip; 32 Jim Reid; 26 Robert Reid; Wide receivers: 9 Mark Barousse; 29 Reggie Butts; 27 Jerome Erdman DB; 26 Clorindo Grilli; 3 Kelley Johnson; 5 Mark Lewis; 31 Glenn Steele; Tight ends: 20 Bob Harding; 73 Mike Hudson	Offensive linemen: 68 Nick Benjamin G; 65 Roger Cattelan T; 55 Irv Daymond G/T; 69 Jerry Dobrovolny G/T; 57 Brad Fawcett T; 54 Ross Francis G; 53 Gerry Hornett G; 63 Billy Kidd C; 50 Kevin Powell T; 51 Pieter Vanden Bos G/C; Defensive linemen: 83 Michel Bourgeau DT; 67 Mike Cline DE; 78 James Curry DT/DE; 64 Ron Engleson DT; 61 Tony Fitzpatrick DT; 76 Loyd Lewis DE; 66 Greg Marshall DE; Special teams: 13 Ken Clark P; 2 Dean Dorsey K	Linebackers: 34 Steve Harrison; 10 Greg Miller; 75 Rick Sowieta; 59 Roy Swoape; 42 Henry Taylor; 79 Alex Troop; 17 Al Washington; Defensive backs: 25 Ricky Barden; 14 Gerald Bess; 14 Dennis Clay; 24 Darryl Hall; 21 Will Lewis; 18 Calvin Loveall; 39 Mike McIntyre; 33 Lamont Meacham; 38 Chris Sigler; 36 Treg Songy; 15 Dale Thompson; 28 Wylie Turner; Italics indicate International player

== Awards and honours ==
=== CFL awards ===
- None

=== CFL All-Stars ===
- None
