= Foudy =

Foudy is a surname. Notable people with the surname include:

- Jean-Luc Foudy (born 2002), Canadian ice hockey player
- Julie Foudy (born 1971), American soccer player
- Liam Foudy (born 2000), Canadian ice hockey player
- Sean Foudy (born 1966), Canadian football player
