= 1989 Winnipeg Blue Bombers season =

Canadian football team season

- General manager: Cal Murphy
- Head coach: Mike Riley
- Home stadium: Winnipeg Stadium

Results
- Record: 7–11
- Division place: 3rd, East
- Playoffs: Lost East Final

The 1989 Winnipeg Blue Bombers finished in third place in the East Division with a 7–11 record.

== Offseason ==
=== CFL draft ===
Round	Pick	Player	Position	School

== Preseason ==
Game	Date	Opponent	Results		Venue	Attendance
Game	Date	Opponent	Score	Record	Venue	Attendance
A	Sun, June 25	at Saskatchewan Roughriders	L 7–37	0–1	Gordie Howe Bowl	3,000
B	Thu, June 29	at Toronto Argonauts	L 16–17	0–2	SkyDome	28,176
C	Wed, July 5	vs. Hamilton Tiger-Cats	L 16–23	0–3	Winnipeg Stadium	20,305

== Regular season ==
=== Standings ===
East Division
Pos	Team	Pld	W	L	T	PF	PA	PD	Pts	Div	Stk
1	Hamilton Tiger-Cats (C, Q)	18	12	6	0	519	517	2	24	9–1	W4
2	Toronto Argonauts (Q)	18	7	11	0	369	428	−59	14	5–5	L2
3	Winnipeg Blue Bombers (Q)	18	7	11	0	408	462	−54	14	3–7	L7
4	Ottawa Rough Riders	18	4	14	0	426	630	−204	8	3–7	W2

Source: "CFL.ca - Official Site of the Canadian Football League". Archived from the original on 2009-11-07.
(C) First round bye; (Q) Qualified for playoffs

=== Season schedule ===
Week	Date	Opponent	Result	Record
1	July 14	vs. Ottawa Rough Riders	W 29–24	1–0
2	July 20	at Hamilton Tiger-Cats	L 22–28	1–1
3	July 25	at Ottawa Rough Riders	W 43–32	2–1
4	Aug 2	vs. Saskatchewan Roughriders	L 27–29	2–2
5	Aug 10	at Toronto Argonauts	L 12–20	2–3
6	Aug 16	vs. Calgary Stampeders	W 27–24	3–3
7	Aug 22	at Calgary Stampeders	L 10–31	3–4
8	Aug 29	vs. Toronto Argonauts	W 34–6	4–4
9	Sept 3	at Saskatchewan Roughriders	W 28–20	5–4
10	Sept 10	vs. BC Lions	W 53–34	6–4
11	Sept 16	at BC Lions	W 24–20	7–4
12	Sept 22	vs. Hamilton Tiger-Cats	L 19–20	7–5
13	Oct 1	vs. Toronto Argonauts	L 17–24	7–6
14	Oct 9	at Edmonton Eskimos	L 7–45	7–7
15	Oct 15	at Hamilton Tiger-Cats	L 21–29	7–8
16	Oct 22	vs. Edmonton Eskimos	L 11–34	7–9
17	Oct 29	vs. Ottawa Rough Riders	L 14–18	7–10
18	Nov 5	at Ottawa Rough Riders	L 10–24	7–11

== Playoffs ==
=== East Semi-Final ===
Team	Q1	Q2	Q3	Q4	Total
Winnipeg Blue Bombers	1	10	8	11	30
Toronto Argonauts	0	0	7	0	7

=== East Final ===
Team	Q1	Q2	Q3	Q4	Total
Winnipeg Blue Bombers	7	1	1	1	10
Hamilton Tiger-Cats	3	1	7	3	14

== Roster ==
1989 Winnipeg Blue Bombers final roster
Quarterbacks: 9 Sammy Garza; 2 Lee Saltz; Running backs: 23 Ricky Blake; 31 Terry Cochrane; 5 Tim Jessie; 32 Matt Pearce; Receivers: 37 Rob Crifo; 73 Randy Fabi; 16 Rick House; 20 William MacKall; 21 James Murphy; 80 Jeff Smith; 22 Perry Tuttle; 26 Ken Winey	Offensive linemen: 59 Lyle Bauer C; 68 Nick Benjamin G; 51 David Black T; 64 Bob Molle G; 69 Scott Redl T/C; 57 Steve Rodehutskors T; 60 Dave Vankoughnett G; 63 Chris Walby T; Defensive linemen: 76 Romel Andrews DE; 99 Jeff Croonen DE; 52 Mike Gray DE; 44 Leon Hatziioannou DT; 75 Stan Mikawos DT; Special teams: 6 Bob Cameron P; 3 Trevor Kennerd K	Linebackers: 34 Greg Battle; 36 Tyrone Jones; 56 Paul Randolph; 58 James West; 43 Quency Williams; Defensive backs: 14 Moustafa Ali; 33 Michael Allen; 15 Less Browne; 29 Paul Clatney; 7 Burt Cummings; 24 Ken Hailey; 10 Rod Hill; 8 Ken Pettway; 30 Darryl Sampson; Injured list: 39 Darren Yewchyn WR; Italics indicate International player
