= 1989 Hamilton Tiger-Cats season =

Season of Canadian Football League team the Hamilton Tiger-Cats

- Head coach: Al Bruno
- Home stadium: Ivor Wynne Stadium

Results
- Record: 12–6
- Division place: 1st, East
- Playoffs: Lost Grey Cup
- Team MOP: Tony Champion
- Team MOC: Rocky DiPietro
- Team MOR: Stephen Jordan

Uniform

The 1989 Hamilton Tiger-Cats season was the 32nd season for the team in the Canadian Football League (CFL) and their 40th overall. The Tiger-Cats finished in first place in the East Division with a 12–6 record and played in the 77th Grey Cup game. The team lost the highest scoring Grey Cup game in the trophy's history to the Saskatchewan Roughriders by a score of 43–40. Tony Champion set a franchise record for most touchdowns in one season with 15 and was the team's nominee for Most Outstanding Player. Paul Osbaldiston nearly matched his franchise record for most converts in a single season. Osbaldiston had 47 converts, two fewer than he scored in 1988.

== Offseason ==
=== CFL draft ===
Round	Pick	Player	Position	School
2	11	Curtis Bell	WR	Washington
2	12	Ernie Schramayr	FB	Purdue
3	19	Wayne Drinkwalter	LB	Thunder Bay Giants
4	27	Mark Brus	TB	Tulsa
5	35	Steve Blyth	DT	San Diego State
6	43	Sam Loucks	TB	McMaster
7	51	Pete Buchanan	LB	Nebraska
8	59	Bill Scollard	P	Saint Mary's

== Preseason ==
Week	Date	Opponent	Results		Venue	Attendance
Week	Date	Opponent	Score	Record	Venue	Attendance
B	June 28	vs. Ottawa Rough Riders	W 41–7	1–0		
C	July 5	at Winnipeg Blue Bombers	W 23–16	2–0		

== Regular season ==
=== Season standings ===
East Division
Pos	Team	Pld	W	L	T	PF	PA	PD	Pts	Div	Stk
1	Hamilton Tiger-Cats (C, Q)	18	12	6	0	519	517	2	24	9–1	W4
2	Toronto Argonauts (Q)	18	7	11	0	369	428	−59	14	5–5	L2
3	Winnipeg Blue Bombers (Q)	18	7	11	0	408	462	−54	14	3–7	L7
4	Ottawa Rough Riders	18	4	14	0	426	630	−204	8	3–7	W2

Source: "CFL.ca - Official Site of the Canadian Football League". Archived from the original on 2009-11-07.
(C) First round bye; (Q) Qualified for playoffs

=== Season schedule ===
Week	Game	Date	Opponent	Results		Venue	Attendance
Week	Game	Date	Opponent	Score	Record	Venue	Attendance
1	1	July 12	at Toronto Argonauts	W 24–15	1–0		
2	2	July 20	vs. Winnipeg Blue Bombers	W 28–22	2–0		
3	3	July 28	at Saskatchewan Roughriders	W 34–17	3–0		
4	4	Aug 4	vs. BC Lions	W 44–38	4–0		
5	5	Aug 10	at Calgary Stampeders	L 8–40	4–1		
6	6	Aug 18	vs. Saskatchewan Roughriders	W 46–40	5–1		
7	7	Aug 23	at Edmonton Eskimos	L 14–37	5–2		
7	8	Aug 28	vs. Calgary Stampeders	L 22–34	5–3		
8	9	Sept 4	vs. Toronto Argonauts	W 23–18	6–3		
9	10	Sept 10	at Ottawa Rough Riders	L 23–40	6–4		
10	11	Sept 17	vs. Ottawa Rough Riders	W 52–34	7–4		
11	12	Sept 22	at Winnipeg Blue Bombers	W 20–19	8–4		
12	13	Sept 29	vs. Edmonton Eskimos	L 12–33	8–5		
13	14	Oct 6	at BC Lions	L 27–46	8–6		
14	15	Oct 15	vs. Winnipeg Blue Bombers	W 29–21	9–6		
15	16	Oct 22	at Ottawa Rough Riders	W 32–22	10–6		
16	17	Oct 29	vs. Toronto Argonauts	W 45–14	11–6		
17	18	Nov 4	at Toronto Argonauts	W 36–27	12–6		

== Postseason ==
=== Schedule ===
Round	Date	Opponent	Results		Venue	Attendance
Round	Date	Opponent	Score	Record	Venue	Attendance
East Final	Nov 19	vs. Winnipeg Blue Bombers	W 14–10	1–0		
Grey Cup	Nov 26	vs. Saskatchewan Roughriders	L 40–43	1–1		

=== Grey Cup ===
Teams	1 Q	2 Q	3 Q	4 Q	Final
Hamilton Tiger-Cats	13	14	3	10	40
Saskatchewan Roughriders	1	21	12	9	43

== Roster ==
1989 Hamilton Tiger-Cats final roster
Quarterbacks: 5 Terry Andrysiak; 19 Todd Dillon; 2 Mike Kerrigan; Running backs: 74 Steve Jackson; 32 Sam Loucks; 19 Derrick McAdoo; 34 Ernie Schramayr; 35 Jed Tommy; 24 Tony Truelove; Wide receivers: 87 Tony Champion; 89 Richard Estell; 1 Earl Winfield; 21 Wally Zatylny; Tight ends: 23 Rocky Dipietro; 25 Lee Knight	Offensive linemen: 68 Mike Derks T; 66 Miles Gorrell T; 63 Darrell Harle G; 60 Bill Henry C; 51 Mark Moors C/G; 56 Jason Riley G; 52 Rae Robirtis C; 56 Dale Sanderson T; Defensive linemen: 77 Grover Covington DE; 62 Ronnie Glanton DT; 64 Tim Lorenz DE; 79 Mark Napiorkowski DE; 59 Rod Skillman DT; 61 Mike Walker DT; Special teams: 3 Paul Osbaldiston K/P	Linebackers: 30 Keith Castello; 38 Darrell Corbin; 39 Ed Gataveckas; 90 Pete Giftopoulos; 78 Darrell Patterson; 43 Frank Robinson; 44 Mark Wallace; Defensive backs: 18 Sonny Gordon; 7 Donnohue Grant; 8 Harold Hicks; 12 Stephen Jordan; 20 Will Lewis; 22 Chris Munford; 6 Jim Rockford; 28 Lance Shields; Injured List: 67 Ralph Scholz G; Italics indicate American players

== Awards and honours ==
- Jerry Keeling was elected into the Canadian Football Hall of Fame as a Player on June 3, 1989.
- CFL's Most Outstanding Canadian Award – Rocky DiPietro (SB)
- CFL's Most Outstanding Rookie Award – Stephen Jordan (DB)

=== 1989 CFL All-Stars ===
- Tony Champion, Wide Receiver
- Rocky DiPietro, Slotback
- Miles Gorrell, Offensive Tackle
- Jason Riley, Offensive Guard
