= 1989 Saskatchewan Roughriders season =

CFL team season

- General manager: Alan Ford
- Head coach: John Gregory
- Home stadium: Taylor Field

Results
- Record: 9–9
- Division place: 3rd, West
- Playoffs: Won Grey Cup

Uniform

The 1989 Saskatchewan Roughriders was the club's 80th year of operation, 75th season of play, and its 32nd season in the Canadian Football League. The team finished in third place in the CFL West Division with a 9–9 record. The Roughriders defeated the Calgary Stampeders in the West Semi-Final and then defeated the heavily-favoured Edmonton Eskimos who had finished with a CFL-record 16 regular season wins. Due to their West Final win, the Roughriders qualified for their first Grey Cup game since the club's loss in the 1976 championship game.

In the 77th Grey Cup, the team faced the 12–6 Hamilton Tiger-Cats who had already defeated the Roughriders in both regular season matches. However, the Roughriders kept it a close game and ultimately won with a Dave Ridgway field goal to win the championship. It was Saskatchewan's first Grey Cup win in 23 years (since the 1966 Grey Cup), and only their second in team history.

== Offseason ==
=== CFL draft ===
Round	Pick	Player	Position	School
1	2	Kevin Smellie	RB	Massachusetts
1	3	Andrew Thomas	CB	Massachusetts
1	4	Donovan Wright	CB	Slippery Rock
2	9	Dan Payne	DT	Simon Fraser
5	36	Rob Zimmerman	FB	Calgary
7	52	Kelly Trithart	LB	Saskatchewan
8	60	Greg Galan	QB	Saskatchewan

== Preseason ==
Game	Date	Opponent	Results		Venue	Attendance
Game	Date	Opponent	Score	Record	Venue	Attendance
A	Sun, June 25	vs. Winnipeg Blue Bombers	W 37–7	1–0	Gordie Howe Bowl	1,500
B	Wed, June 28	vs. Edmonton Eskimos	W 28–24	1–0	Winnipeg Stadium	18,988
C	Tues, July 4	at BC Lions	L 13–30	1–1	BC Place	38,492

== Regular season ==
=== Standings ===
West Division
Pos	Team	Pld	W	L	T	PF	PA	PD	Pts
1	Edmonton Eskimos (C, Q)	18	16	2	0	644	302	+342	32
2	Calgary Stampeders (Q)	18	10	8	0	495	466	+29	20
3	Saskatchewan Roughriders (Q)	18	9	9	0	547	567	−20	18
4	BC Lions	18	7	11	0	521	557	−36	14

Source: "CFL.ca - Official Site of the Canadian Football League". Archived from the original on 2009-11-07.
(C) First round bye; (Q) Qualified for playoffs

=== Schedule ===
Week	Game	Date	Opponent	Results		Venue	Attendance
Week	Game	Date	Opponent	Score	Record	Venue	Attendance
1	1	Wed, July 12	vs. Calgary Stampeders	W 32–29	1–0	Taylor Field	21,595
2	2	Tues, July 18	at BC Lions	W 42–37	2–0	BC Place	41,427
3	3	Fri, July 28	vs. Hamilton Tiger-Cats	L 17–34	2–1	Taylor Field	25,996
4	4	Wed, Aug 2	at Winnipeg Blue Bombers	W 29–27	3–1	Winnipeg Stadium	21,753
5	5	Mon, Aug 7	vs. Ottawa Rough Riders	W 58–22	4–1	Taylor Field	22,194
6	6	Fri, Aug 18	at Hamilton Tiger-Cats	L 40–46	4–2	Ivor Wynne Stadium	19,336
7	7	Thu, Aug 24	vs. BC Lions	L 25–37	4–3	Taylor Field	23,544
8	8	Wed, Aug 30	at Edmonton Eskimos	L 19–45	4–4	Commonwealth Stadium	31,667
8	9	Sun, Sept 3	vs. Winnipeg Blue Bombers	L 20–28	4–5	Taylor Field	28,315
9	10	Sat, Sept 9	at Toronto Argonauts	W 29–24	5–5	SkyDome	35,281
10	11	Sun, Sept 17	vs. Edmonton Eskimos	W 48–35	6–5	Taylor Field	24,776
11	12	Sun, Sept 24	at Ottawa Rough Riders	L 27–36	6–6	Lansdowne Stadium	17,284
12	13	Sat, Sept 30	vs. BC Lions	L 30–32	6–7	Taylor Field	25,013
13	14	Sun, Oct 8	at Calgary Stampeders	W 39–26	7–7	McMahon Stadium	30,174
14	15	Sun, Oct 15	vs. Toronto Argonauts	W 24–18	8–7	Taylor Field	20,953
15	16	Sun, Oct 22	vs. Calgary Stampeders	L 17–23	8–8	Taylor Field	25,200
16	17	Sun, Oct 29	at Calgary Stampeders	W 34–19	9–8	McMahon Stadium	20,754
17	18	Sun, Nov 5	at Edmonton Eskimos	L 17–49	9–9	Commonwealth Stadium	27,242

== Postseason ==
=== Schedule ===
Round	Date	Opponent	Results		Venue	Attendance
Round	Date	Opponent	Score	Record	Venue	Attendance
West Semi-Final	Sun, Nov 12	at Calgary Stampeders	W 33–26	1–0	McMahon Stadium	16,286
West Final	Sun, Nov 19	at Edmonton Eskimos	W 32–21	2–0	Commonwealth Stadium	35,112
77th Grey Cup	Sun, Nov 26	vs. Hamilton Tiger-Cats	W 43–40	3–0	SkyDome	54,088

=== Grey Cup ===
Teams	1 Q	2 Q	3 Q	4 Q	Final
Hamilton Tiger-Cats	13	14	3	10	40
Saskatchewan Roughriders	1	21	12	9	43

==== Grey Cup aftermath ====
For the Grey Cup celebrations, 18,000 fans showed up at Taylor Field, in minus 10 degree Celsius weather to welcome back the club. A few weeks later, it was revealed that the playoff run nearly bankrupted the team. Instead of a projected $85,000 profit, the Riders lost $195,000 due to the cost of the three road games. General Manager Al Ford declared that the team's debt increased to 1.6 million dollars.

== Roster ==
1989 Saskatchewan Roughriders final roster
Quarterbacks: 5 Kent Austin; 1 Jeff Bentrim; 16 Tom Burgess; Running backs: 33 Shawn Daniels; 32 Milson Jones; 14 Tim McCray; 20 Lionel Vital; 35 Brian Walling; Receivers: 25 Rob Bresciani; 81 Ray Elgaard; 85 James Ellingson; 18 Jeff Fairholm; 9 Mark Guy; 80 Don Narcisse; 84 Slater Zaleski	Offensive linemen: 44 Roger Aldag G; 66 Mike Anderson C; 64 Ken Moore T; 51 Dan Payne T; 57 Bob Poley G/C; 62 Vic Stevenson T; 54 Mark Urness G; Defensive linemen: 78 James Curry DT; 77 Wayne Drinkwalter DE; 70 Vince Goldsmith DE; 71 Bobby Jurasin DE; 99 Chuck Klingbeil DT; 79 Gary Lewis DT; Special teams: 10 Terry Baker P; 36 Dave Ridgway K	Linebackers: 39 Dave Albright; 91 Tuineau Alipate; 42 Eddie Lowe; 74 Dan Rashovich; 47 Kelly Trithart; 22 Donovan Wright; Defensive backs: 4 Albert Brown; 7 Richie Hall; 19 John Hoffman; 3 Larry Hogue; 26 Harry Skipper; 27 Glen Suitor; 21 Jeff Treftlin; 24 Steve Wiggins; Injured list: 75 Greg McCormack DE; Italics indicate American player

== Awards and honours ==
- CFL's Coach of the Year, John Gregory
- Grey Cup's Most Valuable Player, Offence: Kent Austin
- Grey Cup's Most Valuable Player, Defence: Chuck Klingbeil
- Grey Cup's Most Valuable Canadian, Dave Ridgway

=== 1989 CFL All-Stars ===
- WR – Don Narcisse
- LB – Eddie Lowe
- K – Dave Ridgway

=== 1989 Western All-Stars ===
- RB – Tim McCray
- SB – Jeff Fairholm
- WR – Don Narcisse
- OG – Roger Aldag
- DT – James Curry
- DE – Bobby Jurasin
- LB – Eddie Lowe
- DS – Glen Suitor
- K – Dave Ridgway
