= 1989 Ottawa Rough Riders season =

Canadian football team season

- Head coach: Steve Goldman
- Home stadium: Lansdowne Park

Results
- Record: 4–14
- Division place: 4th, East
- Playoffs: did not qualify

Uniform

The 1989 Ottawa Rough Riders finished the season in fourth place in the East Division with a 4–14 record and failed to qualify for the post-season.

== Offseason ==
=== CFL draft ===
Rd	Pick	Player	Position	School
1	1	Gerald Wilcox	TE	Weber State
3	17	Sean Foudy	HB	York
4	25	Tom Schimmer	P	Boise State
5	33	Nenad Radulovich	Y	Western Ontario
6	41	Trent Brown	DB	Alberta
7	49	Gord Weber	LB	Ottawa
8	57	Bob Forest	LB	Carleton

=== Preseason ===
Date	Opponent	Result	Record	Attendance
June 28	at Hamilton Tiger-Cats	L 7–41	0–1	
July 4	vs. Toronto Argonauts	L 11–23	0–2	13,776

== Regular season ==
In a game against the Ottawa Rough Riders on October 9, 1989, Pinball Clemons scored his first CFL touchdown.

=== Standings ===
East Division
Pos	Team	Pld	W	L	T	PF	PA	PD	Pts	Div	Stk
1	Hamilton Tiger-Cats (C, Q)	18	12	6	0	519	517	2	24	9–1	W4
2	Toronto Argonauts (Q)	18	7	11	0	369	428	−59	14	5–5	L2
3	Winnipeg Blue Bombers (Q)	18	7	11	0	408	462	−54	14	3–7	L7
4	Ottawa Rough Riders	18	4	14	0	426	630	−204	8	3–7	W2

Source: "CFL.ca - Official Site of the Canadian Football League". Archived from the original on 2009-11-07.
(C) First round bye; (Q) Qualified for playoffs

=== Schedule ===
Week	Date	Opponent	Result	Record	Venue	Attendance
1	July 14	at Winnipeg Blue Bombers	L 24–29	0–1		22,232
2	July 19	vs. Toronto Argonauts	L 17–21	0–2		23,016
3	July 25	vs. Winnipeg Blue Bombers	L 32–43	0–3		23,695
4	Aug 1	at Calgary Stampeders	L 29–35	0–4		18,853
5	Aug 7	at Saskatchewan Roughriders	L 22–58	0–5		22,194
6	Aug 17	vs. Edmonton Eskimos	L 4–39	0–6		21,413
7	Aug 21	at Toronto Argonauts	L 17–22	0–7		33,060
8	Aug 31	vs. BC Lions	L 30–39	0–8		18,576
9	Sept 5	at BC Lions	L 32–49	0–9		31,069
10	Sept 10	vs. Hamilton Tiger-Cats	W 40–23	1–9		16,942
11	Sept 17	at Hamilton Tiger-Cats	L 34–52	1–10		14,327
12	Sept 24	vs. Saskatchewan Roughriders	W 36–27	2–10		17,284
13	Oct 1	vs. Calgary Stampeders	L 13–33	2–11		21,643
14	Oct 9	at Toronto Argonauts	L 21–49	2–12		31,116
15	Oct 15	at Edmonton Eskimos	L 11–55	2–13		30,920
16	Oct 22	vs. Hamilton Tiger-Cats	L 22–32	2–14		14,416
17	Oct 29	at Winnipeg Blue Bombers	W 18–14	3–14		20,541
18	Nov 5	vs. Winnipeg Blue Bombers	W 24–10	4–14		13,757

== Roster ==
1989 Ottawa Rough Riders final roster
Quarterbacks: 9 Damon Allen; 4 Willie Gillus; 3 Ken Hobart; 1 Tony Kimbrough; Running backs: 25 David Conrad; 22 Orville Lee; 19 Robert Reid; 36 Chris Skinner; 33 Anthony Stafford; Receivers: 86 Gerald Alphin; 84 Stacey Dawsey; 17 Ken Evraire; 32 Steve Howlett; 16 Dan Johnston; 88 Ray McDonald; 8 Cornelius Redick; 85 Tyrone Thurman; 87 Gerald Wilcox	Offensive linemen: 52 Brian Hutchings T; 54 Irv Daymond C; 57 Brad Fawcett T; 56 Michel Lamy G/T; 58 Rocco Romano G; 65 Gerald Roper G; 55 Brad Tierney G; 69 Kari Yli-Renko T; Defensive linemen: 96 Alex Carter DE; 72 John Kropke DT; 76 Loyd Lewis DE; 67 Barry Moton DE; 98 Gary Palumbis DT; 74 Joe Seumalo DE; 78 Robert Weir DT; Special teams: 2 Dean Dorsey K; 5 Tom Schimmer P	Linebackers: 44 Bob Forest; 53 Bruce Holmes; 29 Paul McGowan; 34 Charles Merritt; 38 Pat Miller; 35 Pat Wayne; Defensive backs: 14 Scott Flagel; 15 Sean Foudy; 30 Kyle Hall; 91 Darrel Hopper; 27 Daniel Hunter; 6 Tyrone Pope; 31 Derrick White; 26 Troy Wilson; 39 Jeff Yausie; 21 Brett Young; Italics indicate International player

== Awards and honours ==
=== CFL awards ===
- None

=== CFL All-Stars ===
- DS – Scott Flagel
