= 1989 Edmonton Eskimos season =

Canadian football team season

- General manager: Hugh Campbell
- Head coach: Joe Faragalli
- Home stadium: Commonwealth Stadium

Results
- Record: 16–2
- Division place: 1st, West
- Playoffs: Lost West Final

Uniform

The 1989 Edmonton Eskimos season was the 32nd season for the team in the Canadian Football League (CFL) and their 41st overall. The Eskimos finished the season in first place with a CFL record 16 wins and a 16–2 record. They appeared in the West Final where they lost to the Saskatchewan Roughriders.

The 16–2 record-breaking regular season record was eventually matched by the Toronto Argonauts in 2023.

== Pre-season ==
=== Schedule ===
Week	Date	Opponent	Results		Venue	Attendance
Week	Date	Opponent	Score	Record	Venue	Attendance
B	June 28	at Saskatchewn Roughriders	L 24–28	0–1		N/A
C	July 5	vs. Calgary Stampeders	W 41–10	1–1		37,192

== Regular season ==
=== Standings ===
West Division
Pos	Team	Pld	W	L	T	PF	PA	PD	Pts
1	Edmonton Eskimos (C, Q)	18	16	2	0	644	302	+342	32
2	Calgary Stampeders (Q)	18	10	8	0	495	466	+29	20
3	Saskatchewan Roughriders (Q)	18	9	9	0	547	567	−20	18
4	BC Lions	18	7	11	0	521	557	−36	14

Source: "CFL.ca - Official Site of the Canadian Football League". Archived from the original on 2009-11-07.
(C) First round bye; (Q) Qualified for playoffs

=== Season schedule ===
Week	Game	Date	Opponent	Results		Venue	Attendance
Week	Game	Date	Opponent	Score	Record	Venue	Attendance
1	1	July 13	vs. BC Lions	W 20–15	1–0		30,041
2	2	July 21	at Calgary Stampeders	W 54–4	2–0		21,235
3	3	July 27	at Toronto Argonauts	L 17–21	2–1		34,840
4	4	Aug 3	vs. Toronto Argonauts	W 22–21	3–1		28,238
5	5	Aug 9	at BC Lions	W 33–13	4–1		32,158
6	6	Aug 17	at Ottawa Rough Riders	W 39–4	5–1		21,413
7	7	Aug 23	vs. Hamilton Tiger-Cats	W 37–14	6–1		28,861
8	8	Aug 30	vs. Saskatchewan Roughriders	W 45–19	7–1		31,667
8	9	Sept 4	at Calgary Stampeders	W 31–14	8–1		33,139
9	10	Sept 8	vs. Calgary Stampeders	W 28–27	9–1		44,327
10	11	Sept 17	at Saskatchewan Roughriders	L 35–48	9–2		24,776
11	12	Sept 24	vs. BC Lions	W 32–25	10–2		30,173
12	13	Sept 29	at Hamilton Tiger-Cats	W 33–12	11–2		16,387
13	14	Oct 9	vs. Winnipeg Blue Bombers	W 45–7	12–2		28,869
14	15	Oct 15	vs. Ottawa Rough Riders	W 55–11	13–2		30,920
15	16	Oct 22	at Winnipeg Blue Bombers	W 34–11	14–2		23,590
16	17	Oct 28	at BC Lions	W 25–19	15–2		27,116
17	18	Nov 5	vs. Saskatchewan Roughriders	W 49–17	16–2		27,471

Total attendance: 280,567
Average attendance: 31,174 (51.9%)

=== CFL Single Season Records Set ===
- Wins - 16 (since tied by Toronto 2023)
- Games over .500 - 14 (since tied by Toronto 2023)
- Home wins - 9 (since tied by several teams)
- Points scored - 644 (since surpassed)
- 1-point converts - 70 (since surpassed)
- Yards net offence - 7951 (since surpassed)
- First downs - 478 (since surpassed)
- Kickoffs - 113 (since surpassed)
- Turnovers forced - 84 (since surpassed)

== Playoffs ==
=== Schedule ===
Round	Date	Opponent	Results		Venue	Attendance
Round	Date	Opponent	Score	Record	Venue	Attendance
Division Final	Nov 19	vs. Saskatchewan Roughriders	L 21–32	0–1	Commonwealth Stadium	35,112

== Roster ==
1989 Edmonton Eskimos final roster
Quarterbacks: 8 Tracy Ham; 10 Steve Taylor; 15 Rick Worman; Running backs: 83 Chris Johnstone; 22 Blake Marshall; 32 Michael Soles; 26 Reggie Taylor; Receivers: 81 Randy Bec; 27 Marco Cyncar K; 33 Craig Ellis; 88 Tony Hunter; 84 Walter Murray; 25 Tom Richards; 81 Todd Smith; 71 Keith Wright	Offensive linemen: 57 Randy Ambrosie G; 66 Trevor Bowles T; 67 Rod Connop C; 50 Blake Dermott G; 55 Andrew McConnell C; 63 Hector Pothier T; 51 Dave Richardson T; 60 Todd Storme T; 54 Pierre Vercheval G; Defensive linemen: 94 Michel Bourgeau DT; 36 Stewart Hill DE; 75 John Mandarich DT; 46 Greg Stumon DE; 91 Brett Williams DE/DT; Special teams: 4 Jerry Kauric K/P	Linebackers: 30 Danny Bass; 41 Leroy Blugh; 44 Jeff Braswell; 45 Mike McLean; 38 Brian Warren; 47 Larry Wruck; Defensive backs: 5 Stanley Blair; 19 Jerome Erdman; 14 Andre Francis; 24 Mike Hildebrand; 29 Enis Jackson; 13 Mark Mathis; 23 Mark Norman; 20 Don Wilson; Injured list: 6 Warren Jones; Italics indicate American player

== Awards ==
- CFL's Most Outstanding Player Award – Tracy Ham
- Dave Dryburgh Memorial Trophy – Jerry Kauric
- Jeff Nicklin Memorial Trophy – Tracy Ham
- Norm Fieldgate Trophy – Danny Bass
