= 1989 BC Lions season =

Canadian football team season

- Owner: Community Ownership, then Murray Pezim starting September 7
- General manager: Joe Galat
- Head coach: Larry Donovan; Joe Galat (Interim)
- Home stadium: BC Place Stadium

Results
- Record: 7–11
- Division place: 4th, West
- Playoffs: did not qualify

Uniform

The 1989 BC Lions finished in fourth place in the West Division with a 7–11 record and failed to make to playoffs.

The Lions had been community owned throughout their history. The team became privately owned when Murray Pezim purchased it on September 7.

== Offseason ==
=== CFL draft ===
Round	Pick	Player	Position	School

== Preseason ==
Game	Date	Opponent	Results		Venue	Attendance
Game	Date	Opponent	Score	Record	Venue	Attendance
A	Thu, June 29	at Calgary Stampeders	W 25–7	1–0	McMahon Stadium	21,547
B	Tue, July 4	vs. Saskatchewan Roughriders	W 30–13	2–0	BC Place	

== Regular season ==
=== Season standings ===
West Division
Pos	Team	Pld	W	L	T	PF	PA	PD	Pts
1	Edmonton Eskimos (C, Q)	18	16	2	0	644	302	+342	32
2	Calgary Stampeders (Q)	18	10	8	0	495	466	+29	20
3	Saskatchewan Roughriders (Q)	18	9	9	0	547	567	−20	18
4	BC Lions	18	7	11	0	521	557	−36	14

Source: "CFL.ca - Official Site of the Canadian Football League". Archived from the original on 2009-11-07.
(C) First round bye; (Q) Qualified for playoffs

=== Season schedule ===
Week	Game	Date	Opponent	Results		Venue	Attendance
Week	Game	Date	Opponent	Score	Record	Venue	Attendance
1	1	Thu, July 13	at Edmonton Eskimos	L 15–20	0–1	Commonwealth Stadium	30,041
2	2	Tue, July 18	vs. Saskatchewan Roughriders	L 37–42	0–2	BC Place	41,472
3	3	Wed, July 26	vs. Calgary Stampeders	L 26–28	0–3	BC Place	27,342
4	4	Fri, Aug 4	at Hamilton Tiger-Cats	L 38–44	0–4	Ivor Wynne Stadium	17,433
5	5	Wed, Aug 9	vs. Edmonton Eskimos	L 13–33	0–5	BC Place	32,158
6	6	Tue, Aug 15	vs. Toronto Argonauts	W 16–11	1–5	BC Place	27,436
7	7	Thu, Aug 24	at Saskatchewan Roughriders	W 37–25	2–5	Taylor Field	23,544
8	8	Thu, Aug 31	at Ottawa Rough Riders	W 39–30	3–5	Lansdowne Park	18,576
9	9	Tue, Sept 5	vs. Ottawa Rough Riders	W 49–32	4–5	BC Place	31,069
9	10	Sun, Sept 10	at Winnipeg Blue Bombers	L 34–53	4–6	Winnipeg Stadium	26,689
10	11	Sun, Sept 16	vs. Winnipeg Blue Bombers	L 20–24	4–7	BC Place	49,093
11	12	Mon, Sept 24	at Edmonton Eskimos	L 25–32	4–8	Commonwealth Stadium	30,173
12	13	Sun, Sept 30	at Saskatchewan Roughriders	W 32–30	5–8	Taylor Field	25,013
13	14	Fri, Oct 6	vs. Hamilton Tiger-Cats	W 46–27	6–8	BC Place	27,021
14	15	Sat, Oct 14	at Calgary Stampeders	L 11–51	6–9	McMahon Stadium	16,355
15	16	Sat, Oct 21	at Toronto Argonauts	L 18–29	6–10	SkyDome	34,267
16	17	Sat, Oct 28	vs. Edmonton Eskimos	L 19–25	6–11	BC Place	27,116
17	18	Sat, Nov 4	vs. Calgary Stampeders	W 46–21	7–11	BC Place	23,452

== Roster ==
1989 BC Lions final roster
Quarterbacks: 16 Matt Dunigan; 1 Rickey Foggie; Running backs: 4 Tony Cherry; 21 Wes Cooper; 19 Anthony Parker; 23 Jamie Taras; 25 Darrell Wallace; Receivers: 26 Mike Bellefontaine; 27 Jan Carinci DB; 34 Scott Lecky; 13 John MacDonald; 33 Andrew Murray; 20 Paul Nastasiuk; 80 Eric Streater; 2 David Williams	Offensive linemen: 69 Jamie Buis G/T; 67 Larry Clarkson T; 62 John Coflin G/C; 53 Leo Groenewegen G; 66 Jim Mills T; 55 Ian Sinclair C; 54 Rob Smith G/T; 50 Pieter Vanden Bos G; Defensive linemen: 79 Walter Ballard DE; 70 Jerry Beasley DE; 76 Rayford Cooks DT; 79 Derek MacCready DT; 90 Rick Klassen DT; 78 Mack Moore DT; 40 James Parker DE; 60 Mark Turner DT; 77 Steve Wilburn DE	Linebackers: 42 Wayne England; 7 Bernie Glier; 44 Alondra Johnson; 31 Kevin Konar; 45 Filipo Mokofisi; 36 Rob Moretto; 35 Paul Wetmore; Defensive backs: 9 Robin Belanger; 6 Anthony Drawhorn; 17 Stacey Gilcrest; 18 Keith Gooch; 10 Ron Howard; 12 Art Malone; 8 Rick Ryan; 3 Ken Watson; Special teams: 5 Lui Passaglia K/P; Italics indicate International player

== Awards and records ==
- CFLPA's Most Outstanding Community Service Award – Matt Dunigan (QB)
- Matt Dunigan, CFL passing leader (331-for-597 for 4,509 yards)

=== 1989 CFL All-Stars ===
None
