= 1989 CFL draft =

Canadian football draft

The 1989 CFL draft composed of eight rounds where 64 Canadian football players were chosen from eligible Canadian universities and Canadian players playing in the NCAA.

== 1st round ==
= CFL Division All-Star	= CFL All-Star	= Hall of Famer

Pick #	CFL team	Player	Position	School
1	Ottawa Rough Riders	Gerald Wilcox	SB	Weber State
2	Saskatchewan Roughriders	Kevin Smellie	RB	Massachusetts
3	Saskatchewan Roughriders	Andrew Thomas	CB	Massachusetts
4	Saskatchewan Roughriders	Donovan Wright	CB	Slippery Rock
5	Edmonton Eskimos	Michael Soles	RB	McGill
6	BC Lions	Derek MacCready	DE	Ohio State
7	Edmonton Eskimos	Leroy Blugh	LB	Bishop's
8	Winnipeg Blue Bombers	John O'Brien	LB	York

== 2nd round ==
= CFL Division All-Star	= CFL All-Star	= Hall of Famer

Pick #	CFL team	Player	Position	School
9	Saskatchewan Roughriders	Dan Payne	DT	Simon Fraser
10	Toronto Argonauts	Mike Campbell	DT	Slippery Rock
11	Hamilton Tiger-Cats	Curtis Bell	WR	Washington
12	Hamilton Tiger-Cats	Ernie Schramayr	FB	Purdue
13	Edmonton Eskimos	Randy Beckles	SB	Calgary
14	Toronto Argonauts	Craig Keller	SB	British Columbia
15	BC Lions	Paul Wetmore	LB	Acadia
16	Winnipeg Blue Bombers	Moustafa Ali	CB	Carleton

== 3rd round ==
17. Ottawa Rough Riders Sean Foudy TB York

18.Calgary Stampeders Louie Cafazzo DE Western Ontario

19. Hamilton Tiger-Cats Wayne Drinkwalter LB Thunder Bay Giants

20. Calgary Stampeders Richard McCrory T Concordia

21. Edmonton Eskimos Derek Schumann S Bishop's

22. Toronto Argonauts Dave Kinzie DE Bowling Green

23. British Columbia Lions Matt Pearce FB British Columbia

24. Winnipeg Blue Bombers Bertrand Joyel TE Bishop's

== 4th round ==
25. Ottawa Rough Riders Tom Schimmer P Boise State

26. Calgary Stampeders Sroko Zizakovic LB Ohio State

27. Hamilton Tiger-Cats Mark Brus TB Tulsa

28. Calgary Stampeders Brent Pollock T Fresno State

29. Edmonton Eskimos Louis Olsacher G Saint Mary's

30. Toronto Argonauts Mike Cote T Colgate

31. British Columbia Lions Rohan Dove CB Wilfrid Laurier

32. Winnipeg Blue Bombers Matt Pearce FB British Columbia

== 5th round ==
33. Ottawa Rough Riders Nenad Radulovich T Western Ontario

34. Calgary Stampeders Harald Hasselbach DT Washington

35. Hamilton Tiger-Cats Steve Blyth DT San Diego State

36. Saskatchewan Roughriders Rob Zimmerman FB Calgary

37. Edmonton Eskimos Brent Korte DE Alberta

38. Toronto Argonauts Derrick Joseph DT Bishop's

39. British Columbia Lions Pat Nield LB Guelph

40. Winnipeg Blue Bombers Jeff Croonen LB Western Ontario

== 6th round ==
41. Ottawa Rough Riders Trent Brown DB Alberta

42. Calgary Stampeders Dave Mossman S Hawaii

43. Hamilton Tiger-Cats Sam Loucks TB McMaster

44. Edmonton Eskimos Shaun Gardiner LB Saskatchewan

45. Edmonton Eskimos Rob Davidson DT Toronto

46. Toronto Argonauts Roger Dietrich DT Simon Fraser

47. British Columbia Lions Wayne England LB Guelph

48. Winnipeg Blue Bombers Lance Scranton T Dickinson State

== 7th round ==
49. Ottawa Rough Riders Gord Weber LB Ottawa

50. Calgary Stampeders Travis Dunkle DB Calgary

51. Hamilton Tiger-Cats Pete Buchanan LB Nebraska

52. Saskatchewan Roughriders Kelly Trithart LB Saskatchewan

53. Edmonton Eskimos Mike Hildebrand DB Calgary

54. Toronto Argonauts Brian Beckles C Wilfrid Laurier

55. British Columbia Lions Dave Shaw LB Waterloo

56. Winnipeg Blue Bombers Paul Hitchcock SB Acadia

== 8th round ==
57. Ottawa Rough Riders Bob Forest LB Carleton

58. Calgary Stampeders Brian Stiedle T Simon Fraser

59. Hamilton Tiger-Cats Bill Scollard P Saint Mary's

60. Saskatchewan Roughriders Greg Galan QB Saskatchewan

61. Edmonton Eskimos Bruce McDonald S British Columbia

62. Toronto Argonauts Dave Hjarr LB Carleton

63. British Columbia Lions Mark Nykolaichuk TB British Columbia

64. Winnipeg Blue Bombers Ron Bresch T Manitoba
