= 1989 Toronto Argonauts season =

CFL team season

- Head coach: Bob O'Billovich
- Home stadium: SkyDome

Results
- Record: 7–11
- Division place: 2nd, East
- Playoffs: Lost East Semi-Final

Uniform

The 1989 Toronto Argonauts finished in second place in the East Division with a 7–11 record. They appeared in the East Semi-Final. This was the first season at the SkyDome for the Argonauts.

== Regular season ==
In a game against the Ottawa Rough Riders on October 9, 1989, Pinball Clemons scored his first CFL touchdown.

=== Standings ===
East Division
Pos	Team	Pld	W	L	T	PF	PA	PD	Pts	Div	Stk
1	Hamilton Tiger-Cats (C, Q)	18	12	6	0	519	517	2	24	9–1	W4
2	Toronto Argonauts (Q)	18	7	11	0	369	428	−59	14	5–5	L2
3	Winnipeg Blue Bombers (Q)	18	7	11	0	408	462	−54	14	3–7	L7
4	Ottawa Rough Riders	18	4	14	0	426	630	−204	8	3–7	W2

Source: "CFL.ca - Official Site of the Canadian Football League". Archived from the original on 2009-11-07.
(C) First round bye; (Q) Qualified for playoffs

=== Schedule ===
Week	Game	Date	Opponent	Results		Venue	Attendance
Week	Game	Date	Opponent	Score	Record	Venue	Attendance
1	1	July 12	vs. Hamilton Tiger-Cats	L 15–24	0–1	SkyDome	32,527
2	2	July 19	at Ottawa Rough Riders	W 21–17	1–1	Lansdowne Park	18,818
3	3	July 27	vs. Edmonton Eskimos	W 21–17	2–1	SkyDome	34,840
4	4	Aug 3	at Edmonton Eskimos	L 21–22	2–2	Commonwealth Stadium	28,238
5	5	Aug 10	vs. Winnipeg Blue Bombers	W 20–12	3–2	SkyDome	34,549
6	6	Aug 15	at BC Lions	L 11–16	3–3	BC Place	27,436
6	7	Aug 21	vs. Ottawa Rough Riders	W 22–17	4–3	SkyDome	33,060
7	Bye						
8	8	Aug 29	at Winnipeg Blue Bombers	L 6–34	4–4	Winnipeg Stadium	24,459
8	9	Sept 4	at Hamilton Tiger-Cats	L 18–23	4–5	Ivor Wynne Stadium	25,968
9	10	Sept 9	vs. Saskatchewan Roughriders	L 24–29	4–6	SkyDome	35,281
10	11	Sept 15	at Calgary Stampeders	L 16–36	4–7	McMahon Stadium	19,131
11	12	Sept 23	vs. Calgary Stampeders	L 13–20	4–8	SkyDome	35,776
12	13	Oct 1	at Winnipeg Blue Bombers	W 24–17	5–8	Winnipeg Stadium	22,189
13	14	Oct 9	vs. Ottawa Rough Riders	W 49–21	6–8	SkyDome	31,116
14	15	Oct 15	at Saskatchewan Roughriders	L 18–24	6–9	Taylor Field	20,953
15	16	Oct 21	vs. BC Lions	W 29–18	7–9	SkyDome	34,267
16	17	Oct 29	at Hamilton Tiger-Cats	L 14–45	7–10	Ivor Wynne Stadium	17,428
17	18	Nov 4	vs. Hamilton Tiger-Cats	L 27–36	7–11	SkyDome	44,209

== Postseason ==
Round	Date	Opponent	Results		Venue	Attendance
Round	Date	Opponent	Score	Record	Venue	Attendance
East Semi-Final	Nov 12	vs. Winnipeg Blue Bombers	L 7–30	0–1	SkyDome	22,758

== Roster ==
1989 Toronto Argonauts final roster
Quarterbacks: 16 John Congemi; 8 Rick Johnson; 9 Bobby McAllister; 14 Gilbert Renfroe; Running backs: 31 Michael Clemons; 6 Gill Fenerty; 34 Ryan Hanson; 37 Warren Hudson; 20 Peter Mangold; 33 Terry Underwood; Receivers: 10 Brian Bedford; 71 Curtis Bell; 80 Jeff Boyd; 84 Darnell Graham; 23 Eric Hoskins; 88 Paul Masotti; 1 Darrell Smith; 19 Emanuel Tolbert	Offensive linemen: 56 Ian Beckstead C; 63 Jim Kardash T; 51 Dave Kinzie T; 65 Sean McKeown G; 66 Kelvin Pruenster T; 54 Blaine Schmidt G; 67 Chris Schultz T; 64 Bob Skemp G/C; Defensive linemen: 99 Jearld Baylis DT; 69 Mike Campbell DT; 74 Willie Fears DE; 70 Harold Hallman DT; 77 Rodney Harding DE; 68 Glenn Kulka DE; 61 Branko Vincic DT	Linebackers: 35 Bruce Elliott; 38 Chris Gaines; 36 Don Moen; 32 Willie Pless; 90 Tony Visco; Defensive backs: 13 Ed Berry; 21 Reggie Berry; 7 Carl Brazley; 27 Doran Major; 2 Reggie Pleasant; 18 Floyd Salazar; 26 Todd Wiseman; Special teams: 4 Lance Chomyc K/P; 11 Glenn Harper P; Italics indicate International player
