= 1989 Calgary Stampeders season =

Canadian football team season

- General manager: Norman Kwong
- Head coach: Larry Kuharich
- Home stadium: McMahon Stadium

Results
- Record: 10–8
- Division place: 2nd, West
- Playoffs: Lost West Semi-Final

The 1989 Calgary Stampeders finished in second place in the West Division with a 10–8 record. They were defeated in the West Semi-Final by the Saskatchewan Roughriders.

This season started the following streaks for the Stampeders:

- 12 consecutive seasons above .500 (1989-2000)
- 12 consecutive seasons .500 or better (1989-2000)
- 12 consecutive seasons 10+ wins (1989-2000)
- 13 consecutive seasons making the playoffs (1989-2001)
- 13 consecutive seasons hosting at least one playoff game (1989-2001)

== Offseason ==
=== CFL draft ===
Round	Pick	Player	Position	School
3	18	Louie Cafazzo	DE	Western Ontario
3	20	Richard McCrory	T	Concordia
4	26	Sroko Zizakovic	LB	Ohio State
4	28	Brent Pollock	T	Fresno State
5	34	Harald Hasselbach	DT	Washington
6	42	Dave Mossman	S	Hawaii
7	50	Travis Dunkle	DB	Calgary
8	58	Brian Stiedle	T	Simon Fraser

== Preseason ==
Week	Date	Opponent	Result	Attendance	Record
A	Thu, June 29	vs. BC Lions	L 7–25	0–1	21,547
B	Wed, July 5	at Edmonton Eskimos	L 10–41	0–2	37,192

== Regular season ==
=== Season standings ===
West Division
Pos	Team	Pld	W	L	T	PF	PA	PD	Pts
1	Edmonton Eskimos (C, Q)	18	16	2	0	644	302	+342	32
2	Calgary Stampeders (Q)	18	10	8	0	495	466	+29	20
3	Saskatchewan Roughriders (Q)	18	9	9	0	547	567	−20	18
4	BC Lions	18	7	11	0	521	557	−36	14

Source: "CFL.ca - Official Site of the Canadian Football League". Archived from the original on 2009-11-07.
(C) First round bye; (Q) Qualified for playoffs

=== Season schedule ===
Week	Game	Date	Opponent	Results		Venue	Attendance
Week	Game	Date	Opponent	Score	Record	Venue	Attendance
1	1	Wed, July 12	at Saskatchewan Roughriders	L 29–32	0–1	Taylor Field	21,595
2	2	Fri, July 21	vs. Edmonton Eskimos	L 4–54	0–2	McMahon Stadium	21,235
3	3	Wed, July 26	at BC Lions	W 28–26	1–2	BC Place	27,342
4	4	Tue, Aug 1	vs. Ottawa Rough Riders	W 35–29	2–2	McMahon Stadium	18,853
5	5	Thu, Aug 10	vs. Hamilton Tiger-Cats	W 40–8	3–2	McMahon Stadium	19,031
6	6	Wed, Aug 16	at Winnipeg Blue Bombers	L 24–27	3–3	Winnipeg Stadium	23,582
7	7	Tue, Aug 22	vs. Winnipeg Blue Bombers	W 31–10	4–3	McMahon Stadium	19,631
7	8	Mon, Aug 28	at Hamilton Tiger-Cats	W 34–22	5–3	Ivor Wynne Stadium	14,291
8	9	Mon, Sep 4	vs. Edmonton Eskimos	L 14–31	5–4	McMahon Stadium	33,139
9	10	Fri, Sep 8	at Edmonton Eskimos	L 27–38	5–5	Commonwealth Stadium	44,327
10	11	Fri, Sep 15	vs. Toronto Argonauts	W 36–16	6–5	McMahon Stadium	19,131
11	12	Sat, Sept 23	at Toronto Argonauts	W 20–12	7–5	SkyDome	35,776
12	13	Sun, Oct 1	at Ottawa Rough Riders	W 33–13	8–5	Lansdowne Park	21,643
13	14	Sun, Oct 8	vs. Saskatchewan Roughriders	L 26–39	8–6	McMahon Stadium	30,174
14	15	Sat, Oct 14	vs. BC Lions	W 51–11	9–6	McMahon Stadium	16,355
15	16	Sun, Oct 22	at Saskatchewan Roughriders	W 23–17	10–6	Taylor Field	25,200
16	17	Sun, Oct 29	vs. Saskatchewan Roughriders	L 19–34	10–7	McMahon Stadium	20,754
17	18	Sat, Nov 4	at BC Lions	L 21–46	10–8	BC Place	23,452

== Playoffs ==
=== West Semi-Final ===
Team	Q1	Q2	Q3	Q4	Total
Saskatchewan Roughriders	?	?	?	?	33
Calgary Stampeders	?	?	?	?	26

== Roster ==
1989 Calgary Stampeders final roster
Quarterbacks: 8 Danny Barrett; 9 Terrence Jones; Running backs: 26 Willie Caston; 33 Lorenzo Graham; 28 Kennard Martin; 34 Andy McVey; 12 Tim Petros; 27 Tony Spoletini; Receivers: 1 Andre Alexander; 87 Jacques Chapdelaine; 71 Jay Christensen; 85 Brock Smith; 76 Marshall Toner; 89 Larry Willis; 11 Marc Zeno	Offensive linemen: 59 Leo Blanchard T; 69 Lou Cafazzo T; 62 Lloyd Fairbanks T; 66 Dan Ferrone G; 65 Mike Palumbo C; 53 Greg Reynard G; 61 Tom Spoletini G; 64 Craig Watson G; Defensive linemen: 84 Gene Belliveau DE; 90 Flint Fleming DE; 91 Will Johnson DE; 75 Stu Laird DT; 74 Mitchell Price DT; 93 Kent Warnock DT; Injured list: 95 Lemont Jeffers LB	Linebackers: 37 Matt Finlay; 97 Kenny Ford; 41 Ian James; 39 Doug Landry; 45 Vernell Quinn; 35 Dan Wicklum; Defensive backs: 16 Howard Fields; 15 Ron Hopkins; 30 Jim Jauch; 32 Darcy Kopp; 20 Chris Major; 3 David McCrary; 24 Greg Peterson; 2 Junior Thurman; Special teams: 4 Brent Matich P; 13 Mark McLoughlin K; Italics indicate International player
