= Liam Foudy =

Canadian ice hockey player (born 2000)

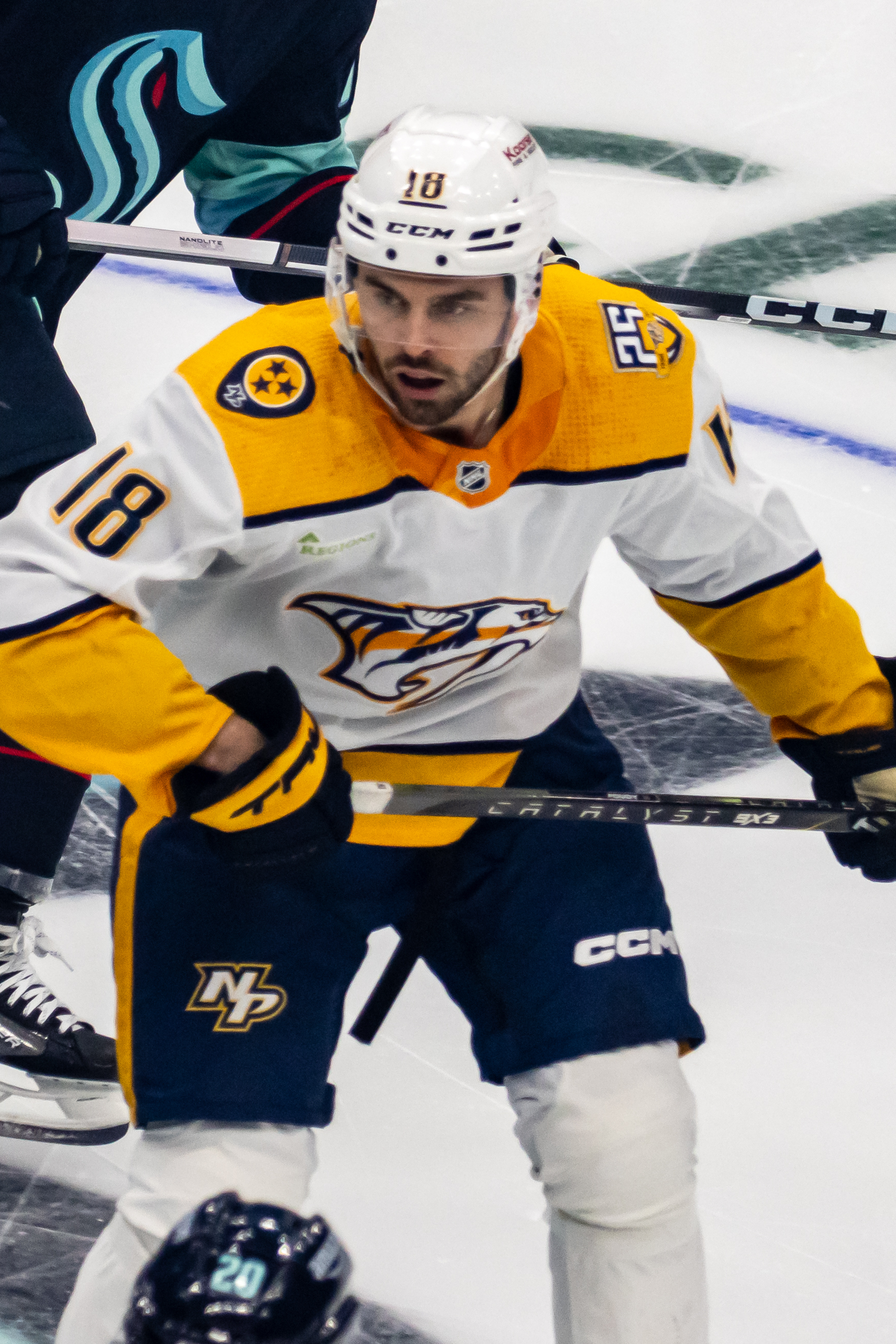
- Born: February 4, 2000 (age 26) Toronto, Ontario, Canada
- Height: 6 ft 1 in (185 cm)
- Weight: 186 lb (84 kg; 13 st 4 lb)
- Position: Forward
- Shoots: Left
- NHL team (P) Cur. team Former teams: New York Islanders; Hamilton Hammers (AHL); Columbus Blue Jackets; Nashville Predators
- National team: Canada
- NHL draft: 18th overall, 2018; Columbus Blue Jackets
- Playing career: 2019–present

Liam Foudy (born February 4, 2000) is a Canadian professional ice hockey player who is a forward for the Hamilton Hammers of the American Hockey League (AHL) while under contract to the New York Islanders of the National Hockey League (NHL). He was selected 18th overall by the Columbus Blue Jackets in the 2018 NHL entry draft.

== Playing career ==
=== Junior ===
==== London Knights ====
Foudy was selected 18th overall in the 2016 OHL Priority Selection by the London Knights.

Foudy made his OHL debut on September 21, 2016, as he had no points in a 4–1 loss to the Sarnia Sting. In his next game two days later, Foudy earned his first career OHL point, an assist, in a 6–2 victory over the Erie Otters. On November 12, Foudy recorded his first career OHL goal, as he scored against Liam Herbst of the Guelph Storm in a 4–1 win. On February 26, 2017, Foudy recorded the first multi-point game of his OHL career, as he scored a goal and an assist in an 8–1 win over the Guelph Storm. Overall, Foudy finished the 2016–17 season with nine goals and 15 points in 58 games for the Knights. On March 24, 2017, Foudy appeared in his first career OHL playoff game, as he had no points in a 4–3 overtime loss to the Windsor Spitfires. In thirteen post-season games, Foudy did not record a point.

In his second season with the Knights in 2017–18, Foudy saw an increase in his offensive production. On January 5, 2018, Foudy recorded his first career multi-goal game, scoring twice against Jake McGrath of the Sudbury Wolves in a 5–1 victory. Overall, in 65 games during the season, Foudy scored 24 goals and 40 points. On March 22, 2018, Foudy earned his first career OHL playoff point, an assist, in a 5–4 loss to the Owen Sound Attack. One week later, Foudy scored his first career OHL playoff goal, scoring against Olivier Lafreniere of the Attack, in a 2–1 loss. In four post-season games, Foudy scored a goal and two points.

Foudy returned to London after being reassigned to the Knights following training camp with the Columbus Blue Jackets for the 2018–19 season. On November 23, 2018, Foudy recorded his first career three point game in the OHL, as he scored a goal and two assists in a 7–2 win over the Owen Sound Attack. In his next game two days later, Foudy scored two goals and an assist in a 4–2 win over the Windsor Spitfires for back-to-back three point games. Later in the season, on January 25, Foudy recorded his first career four point game, as he scored a goal and three assists in a 7–0 win over the Windsor Spitfires. In 62 games during the regular season, Foudy scored 36 goals and 68 points. On March 26, 2019, Foudy recorded his first multi-point game in the post-season, scoring a goal and an assist in a 6–3 win over the Windsor Spitfires. In 11 post-season games, Foudy scored six goals and 12 points.

Foudy joined the Knights for a fourth season in 2019–20 after being reassigned to the team by the Columbus Blue Jackets. On November 21, Foudy recorded his second career four point game, as he scored two goals and two assists in a 5–2 win over the Mississauga Steelheads. Foudy concluded the season on a career high 18 game point streak, as he scored 13 goals and 34 points during this streak. In 45 games, Foudy scored 28 goals and tied his career high with 68 points.

=== Professional ===
==== Columbus Blue Jackets ====
After two seasons with the Knights, Foudy was selected 18th overall by the Columbus Blue Jackets in the 2018 NHL entry draft. On July 30, 2018, Foudy was signed to a three-year, entry-level contract with the Blue Jackets.

Following the completion of his season with the London Knights of the Ontario Hockey League (OHL), the Blue Jackets assigned Foudy to their American Hockey League (AHL) affiliate, the Cleveland Monsters, for the 2019 Calder Cup playoffs. On April 19, 2019, Foudy appeared in his first career professional game, as he was held to no points in a 5–3 win over the Syracuse Crunch. On April 25, Foudy scored his first career professional goal, against Edward Pasquale of the Syracuse Crunch. Foudy scored a second goal in the game, as he helped the Monsters defeat the Crunch 3–0. In eight playoff games with Cleveland, Foudy scored two goals.

Foudy played in his NHL debut against the Tampa Bay Lightning on February 10, 2020, as he was recalled by the Blue Jackets on an emergency basis. He was held off the score sheet in his first game. In his second game, Foudy earned an assist on a goal scored by Boone Jenner in a 4–3 loss to the Buffalo Sabres on February 13.

Foudy scored his first career NHL goal in Game 5 of the Qualifying Round of the 2020 Stanley Cup playoffs in a 3–0 victory against the Toronto Maple Leafs.

==== Nashville Predators ====
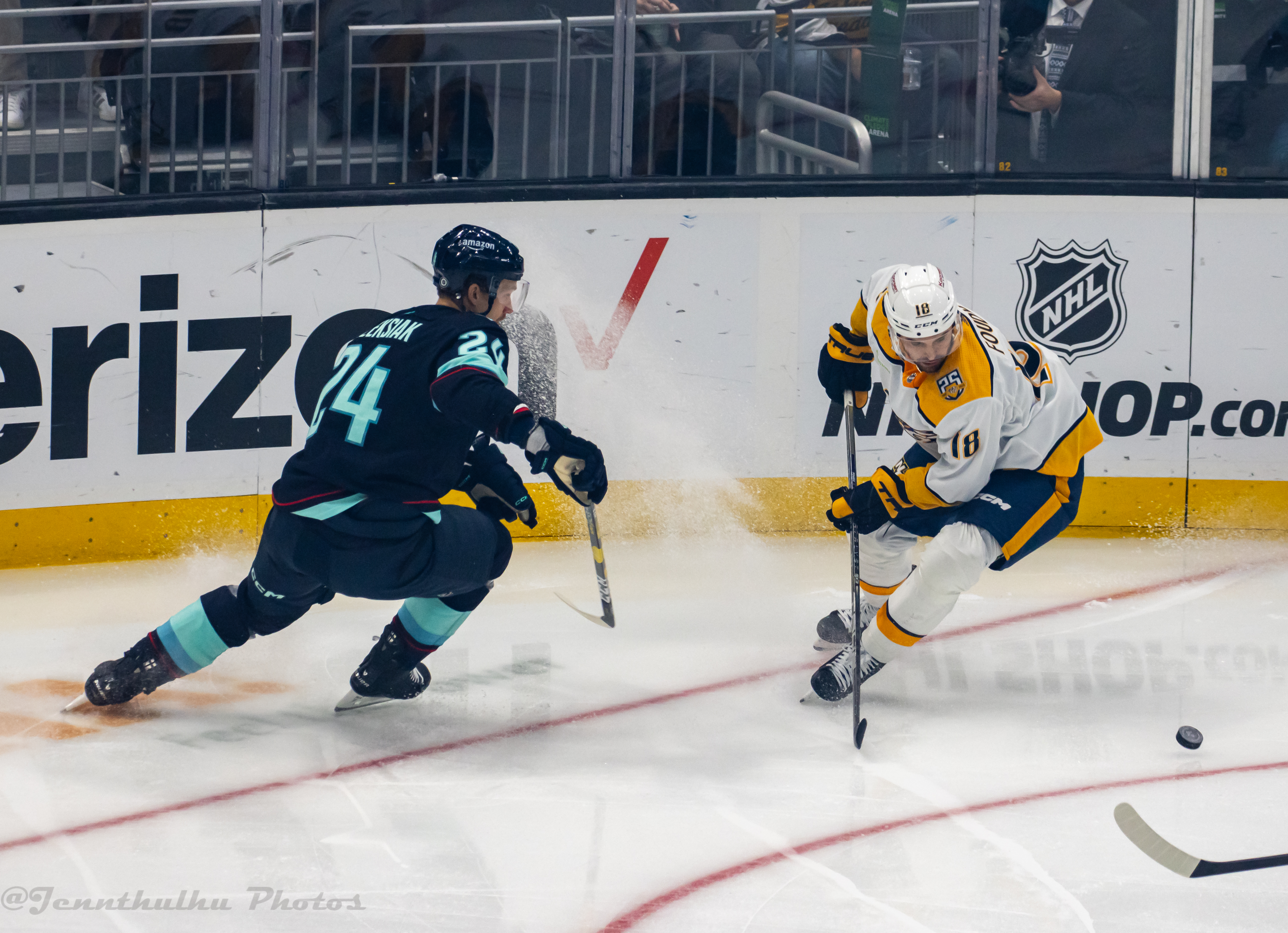
Foudy (right) and Jamie Oleksiak of the Seattle Kraken in 2023.

On October 21, 2023, Foudy was claimed off waivers by the Nashville Predators. He made his Predators debut in a 3-2 overtime victory against the Toronto Maple Leafs on October 28. On December 7, after 12 appearances with the Predators, he was placed on waivers. The following day he cleared and was assigned to the Milwaukee Admirals of the American Hockey League (AHL). He featured with the Admirals for the remainder of the season, posting 10 goals and 16 points through 28 games.

==== New York Islanders ====
As a free agent from the Predators, Foudy was signed to a one-year, two-way contract with the New York Islanders on July 10, 2024. On June 29, 2025, he was re-signed to a one-year, two-way contract by the Islanders. New York then re-signed Foudy to a one-year, two-way contract on May 26, 2026.

== International play ==
Medal record

Men's ice hockey

Representing Canada

World Championships
Gold medal – first place	2021 Latvia	

World Junior Championships
Gold medal – first place	2020 Czech Republic	

Foudy was selected to represent Canada under-18 team at the 2018 World U18 Championships.

== Personal life ==
Foudy's parents were both athletes: his mother France Gareau was an Olympic sprinter who won a silver medal at the 1984 Summer Olympics and his father Sean Foudy played in the Canadian Football League for the Ottawa Rough Riders and BC Lions from 1989 to 1994. His brother, Jean-Luc, was selected by the Colorado Avalanche in the third round, 75th overall, of the 2020 NHL entry draft.

== Career statistics ==
=== Regular season and playoffs ===
			Regular season					Playoffs
Season	Team	League	GP	G	A	Pts	PIM	GP	G	A	Pts	PIM
2015–16	Markham Majors	GTMMHL	32	19	19	38	14	—	—	—	—	—
2016–17	London Knights	OHL	58	9	6	15	19	13	0	0	0	0
2017–18	London Knights	OHL	65	24	16	40	22	4	1	1	2	0
2018–19	London Knights	OHL	62	36	32	68	32	11	6	6	12	12
2018–19	Cleveland Monsters	AHL	—	—	—	—	—	8	2	0	2	2
2019–20	London Knights	OHL	45	28	40	68	24	—	—	—	—	—
2019–20	Columbus Blue Jackets	NHL	2	0	1	1	0	10	1	1	2	0
2020–21	Columbus Blue Jackets	NHL	24	0	4	4	6	—	—	—	—	—
2020–21	Cleveland Monsters	AHL	12	3	13	16	0	—	—	—	—	—
2021–22	Cleveland Monsters	AHL	29	7	12	19	6	—	—	—	—	—
2021–22	Columbus Blue Jackets	NHL	1	0	0	0	0	—	—	—	—	—
2022–23	Columbus Blue Jackets	NHL	62	7	7	14	8	—	—	—	—	—
2023–24	Columbus Blue Jackets	NHL	1	0	0	0	0	—	—	—	—	—
2023–24	Nashville Predators	NHL	12	0	3	3	2	—	—	—	—	—
2023–24	Milwaukee Admirals	AHL	28	10	6	16	14	7	0	0	0	6
2024–25	Bridgeport Islanders	AHL	70	20	25	45	24	—	—	—	—	—
2024–25	New York Islanders	NHL	2	0	0	0	0	—	—	—	—	—
2025–26	Bridgeport Islanders	AHL	60	26	21	47	14	2	0	0	0	0
2025–26	New York Islanders	NHL	1	0	0	0	0	—	—	—	—	—
NHL totals			105	7	15	22	16	10	1	1	2	0

=== International ===
Year	Team	Event	Result	GP	G	A	Pts	PIM
2016	Canada White	U17	4th	6	0	3	3	0
2018	Canada	U18	5th	5	2	2	4	0
2020	Canada	WJC	1st place, gold medalist(s)	7	3	1	4	4
2021	Canada	WC	1st place, gold medalist(s)	10	0	2	2	0
Junior totals				18	5	6	11	4
Senior totals				10	0	2	2	0

Awards and achievements
Preceded by Pierre-Luc Dubois	Columbus Blue Jackets first-round draft pick 2018	Succeeded by Egor Chinakhov
