= Stephen Jordan (Canadian football) =

American football player (born 1966)

Profile
- Position: Defensive back

Personal information
- Born: August 27, 1966 (age 60); Sacramento, California, U.S.

Career information
- College: Illinois

Career history
- 1989–1990: Hamilton Tiger-Cats
- 1991–1992: Edmonton Eskimos

Awards and highlights
- CFL Rookie of the Year (1989); CFL East All-Star (1989)

Stephen Jordan (born August 27, 1966) is an American former professional football player who was a defensive back in the Canadian Football League (CFL).

Jordan played college football for the Illinois Fighting Illini. His professional career began with the Hamilton Tiger-Cats in 1989, the year he won the CFL's Most Outstanding Rookie Award. After another year in Hamilton, he finished his career after two seasons with the Edmonton Eskimos.
