= Derek MacCready =

Canadian gridiron football player (born 1967)

No. 79
- Position: Defensive Tackle/End

Personal information
- Born: May 4, 1967 (age 59); Montreal, Quebec, Canada

Career information
- College: Waldorf College/ The Ohio State University
- NFL draft: 1989: Picked by the Detroit Lions 9th round, 226th overall pick
- CFL draft: 1989: Picked by the BC Lions 1st round, 6th overall pick

Career history
- 1989–1993: BC Lions
- 1994–1995: Ottawa Rough Riders
- 1996–1998: Edmonton Eskimos
- 1999: Hamilton Tiger-Cats

Awards and highlights
- 1985-1986 NJCAA All American, 1990’s Edmonton All Decade Team, 1997 Eskimos nomination for Most Outstanding Canadian: Grey Cup champion (1999)

Derek MacCready (born May 4, 1967) is a Canadian former professional football defensive tackle who played eleven seasons for four teams from 1989 to 1999 in the Canadian Football League (CFL).
