= Jean-Luc Foudy =

Canadian ice hockey player (born 2002)

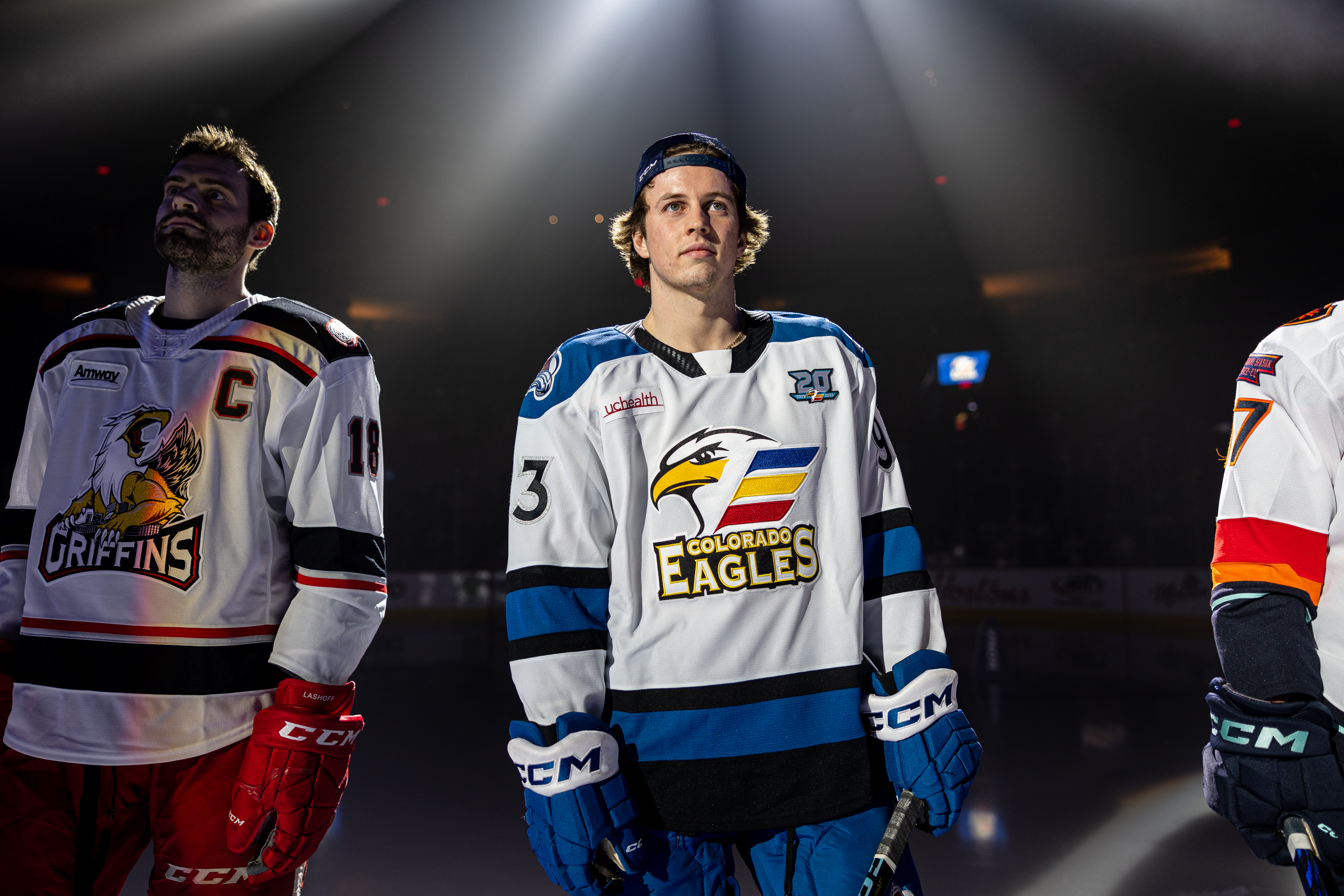
- Foudy with the Colorado Eagles in 2023
- Born: May 13, 2002 (age 24) Toronto, Ontario, Canada
- Height: 5 ft 11 in (180 cm)
- Weight: 177 lb (80 kg; 12 st 9 lb)
- Position: Forward
- Shoots: Right
- DEL team Former teams: Eisbären Berlin; Colorado Avalanche
- NHL draft: 75th overall, 2020; Colorado Avalanche
- Playing career: 2020–present

Jean-Luc Foudy (born May 13, 2002) is a Canadian professional ice hockey player who is a forward for Eisbären Berlin of the Deutsche Eishockey Liga (DEL). He was selected in the third round, 75th overall, by the Colorado Avalanche in the 2020 NHL entry draft.

== Playing career ==
=== Junior ===
Foudy played as a junior in Ontario, Canada with the Toronto Titans Minor Midget AAA's in the Greater Toronto Hockey League (GTHL), posting 25 goals and 35 assists through 52 game before he was selected 10th overall by the Windsor Spitfires of the Ontario Hockey League (OHL) in the 2018 OHL Priority Selection Draft.

In committing to the Spitfires, Foudy joined the team for the 2018–19 season and was immediately relied upon as an offensive threat, leading the team and the league as a rookie with 41 assists. On the Spitfires top-line, Foudy finished with eight goals and 41 assists through 63 regular season games.

In his draft-eligible 2019–20 season, Foudy continued his development by posting 15 goals and 28 assists through 59 regular season games before the playoffs were cancelled due to the beginning of the COVID-19 pandemic. After he was rated the 33rd North American skater by the NHL Central Scouting Bureau, on October 8, 2020, Foudy was selected in the third round, 75th overall, of the 2020 NHL entry draft by the Colorado Avalanche.

=== Professional ===
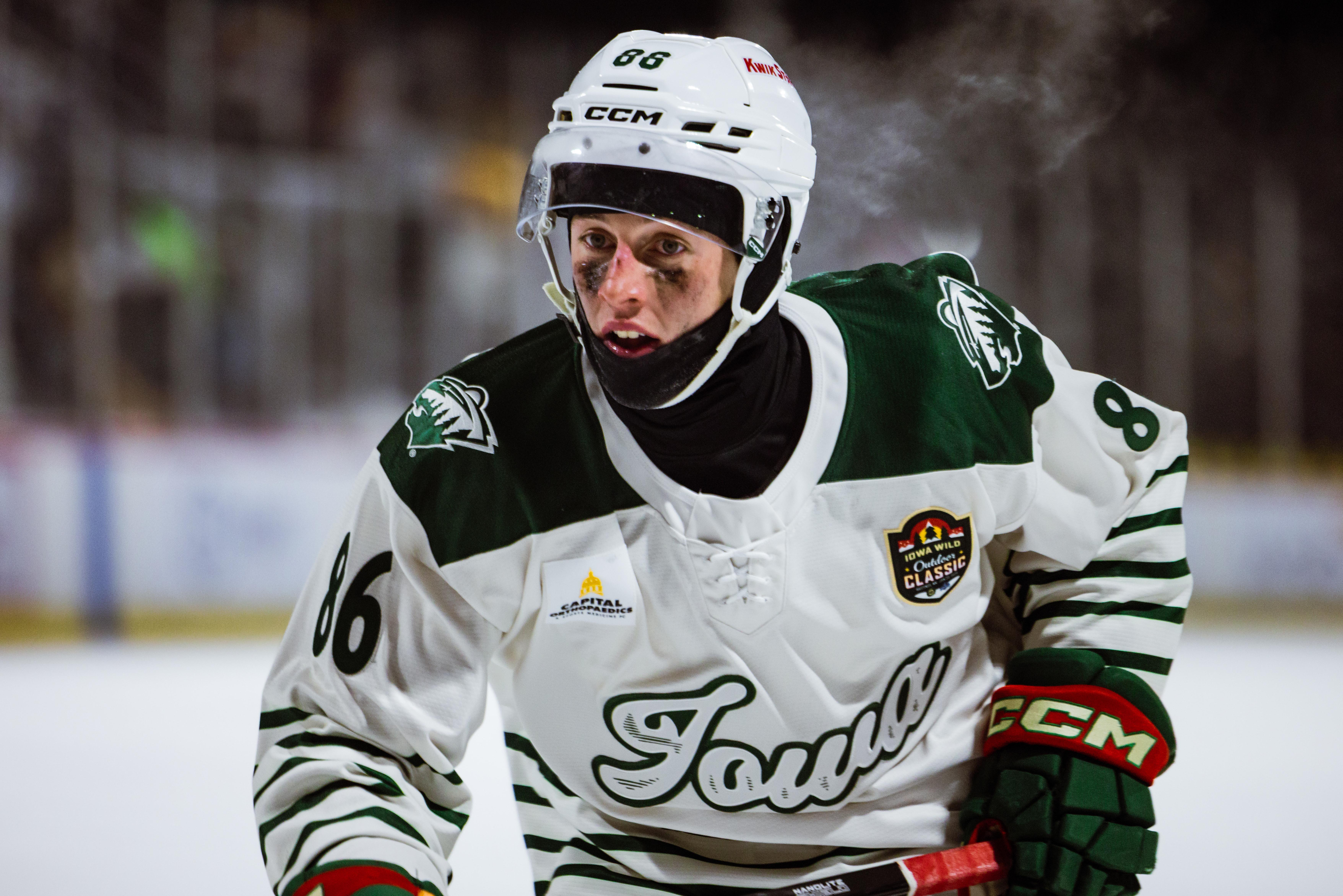
Foudy with the Iowa Wild in January 2026

With the impact of the ongoing pandemic affecting the commencement of the OHL, Foudy opted to continue his development in accepting a loan assignment by the Spitfires to join Swedish third-tier club Mörrums GoIS of the Hockeyettan on November 27, 2020. In making his professional debut, Foudy featured in 10 games, collecting three points before ending his brief tenure in the HockeyEttan to return to North America signing an amateur tryout (ATO) contract to attend the training camp of the Avalanche's American Hockey League (AHL) affiliate, the Colorado Eagles, on January 16, 2021.

With the OHL later confirming the cancellation of the season, Foudy remained with the Eagles for the duration of the 2020–21 season, recording three goals and 11 assists in 34 games, finishing fourth on the team in points and second in assists. He added one point in two postseason contests, as Colorado were defeated in the final game of the Pacific Division's play-in tournament.

On May 26, 2021, Foudy was signed by the Avalanche to a three-year, entry-level contract. With his junior career completed due to an exemption to continue his development in the AHL following the interruption of the COVID-19 pandemic, Foudy continued to show his offensive potential in the 2021–22 season, increasing his output with nine goals and 17 assists for 26 points through 65 regular season games. He broke out in the playoffs for the Eagles, notching four goals and seven points through nine contests.

In returning for his third season with the Eagles in 2022–23, Foudy secured a top-line scoring role and was among the team leaders with 14 points through 18 games before he received his first recall to the injury-plagued Avalanche on November 28, 2022. In joining the Avalanche on the road, Foudy made his NHL debut the following day in a 5–0 loss to the Winnipeg Jets on November 29, 2022.

After five seasons within the Avalanche organization, Foudy was not tendered a qualifying offer and was released as a free agent. Approaching the 2025–26 season, Foudy remained unsigned before accepting a tryout to attend the Minnesota Wild training camp. He was later released from training camp and reassigned on a professional tryout (PTO) agreement to join their AHL affiliate, the Iowa Wild, for the beginning of the season on October 8, 2025.

On September 21, 2026, Foudy was signed to a one-year contract by Eisbären Berlin of the Deutsche Eishockey Liga (DEL).

== Personal life ==
Foudy's parents were both athletes – his mother France Gareau was an sprinter who won a silver medal at the 1984 Summer Olympics and his father Sean Foudy played in the Canadian Football League (CFL) for the Ottawa Rough Riders and BC Lions from 1989 to 1994. His older brother, Liam is a professional ice hockey player for the New York Islanders of the NHL.

== Career statistics ==
=== Regular season and playoffs ===
			Regular season					Playoffs
Season	Team	League	GP	G	A	Pts	PIM	GP	G	A	Pts	PIM
2017–18	Toronto Titans	GTHL	52	25	35	60	40	—	—	—	—	—
2018–19	Windsor Spitfires	OHL	63	8	41	49	16	4	0	1	1	2
2019–20	Windsor Spitfires	OHL	59	15	28	43	12	—	—	—	—	—
2020–21	Mörrums GoIS	SWE.3	10	2	1	3	6	—	—	—	—	—
2020–21	Colorado Eagles	AHL	34	3	11	14	12	2	0	1	1	0
2021–22	Colorado Eagles	AHL	65	9	17	26	28	9	4	3	7	2
2022–23	Colorado Eagles	AHL	46	11	25	36	34	—	—	—	—	—
2022–23	Colorado Avalanche	NHL	9	0	0	0	6	—	—	—	—	—
2023–24	Colorado Eagles	AHL	26	4	10	14	18	3	0	0	0	2
2023–24	Colorado Avalanche	NHL	4	1	0	1	0	—	—	—	—	—
2024–25	Colorado Eagles	AHL	48	5	14	19	20	6	1	0	1	2
2025–26	Iowa Wild	AHL	68	5	20	25	32	—	—	—	—	—
NHL totals			13	1	0	1	6	—	—	—	—	—

=== International ===
Year	Team	Event	Result	GP	G	A	Pts	PIM
2018	Canada Black	U17	5th	5	1	3	4	2
2019	Canada	HG18	2nd place, silver medalist(s)	5	2	2	4	2
Junior totals				10	3	5	8	4

== Awards and honours ==
Award	Year	Ref
AHL
All-Star Game	2023	
