= Matt Pearce =

Profile
- Position: Fullback

Personal information
- Born: 22 April 1967; Prince George, British Columbia, Canada
- Died: 23 January 2016 (aged 48); Prince George, British Columbia, Canada
- Listed height: 6 ft 2 in (1.88 m)
- Listed weight: 202 lb (92 kg)

Career information
- University: British Columbia
- CFL draft: 1989: 3rd round, 23rd overall pick

Career history
- 1989–1995: Winnipeg Blue Bombers

Awards and highlights
- Grey Cup champion (1990)

Matthew Pearce (22 April 1967 – 23 January 2016) was a Canadian professional football player who played for the Winnipeg Blue Bombers and Montreal Concordes. Prior to his career in the Canadian Football League (CFL), he played at the University of British Columbia. After his career, he was a teacher in his hometown of Prince George, British Columbia, also serving with the Prince George District Teachers' Association at one point. He died of an apparent heart attack in 2016.
