= Moustafa Ali =

Canadian football player (1965–2025)

Profile
- Position: Defensive back

Personal information
- Born: December 30, 1965; Alexandria, Egypt
- Died: December 2, 2025 (aged 59); Ottawa, Ontario, Canada
- Listed height: 6 ft 3 in (1.91 m)
- Listed weight: 200 lb (91 kg)

Career information
- High school: Confederation HS
- University: Carleton
- CFL draft: 1989: 2nd round, 16th overall pick

Career history
- 1989–1990: Winnipeg Blue Bombers
- 1990: Hamilton Tiger-Cats*
- 1990: Calgary Stampeders
- 1991: Winnipeg Blue Bombers*
- 1993: Ottawa Rough Riders*
- * Offseason or practice squad member only

Moustafa Ali (Arabic: مصطفى على; December 30, 1965 – December 2, 2025) was an Egyptian-born Canadian football defensive back who played for the Winnipeg Blue Bombers and Calgary Stampeders of the Canadian Football League (CFL). After being selected in the second round of the 1989 CFL draft, he played in 25 regular season games and recorded 21 tackles and two interceptions from 1989 to 1990. In the early 1990s, Ali participated on the practice squads of multiple teams.

== Professional career ==
Ali was selected in the second round of the 1989 CFL Draft by the Winnipeg Blue Bombers with the 16th overall pick. The Blue Bombers used Ali primarily as a safety due to weaknesses in their secondary coverage. Ali missed time due to an injury in October 1989. During his rookie season, Ali made 21 tackles and caught two interceptions over 17 games.

In 1990, the Blue Bombers released Ali as part of their final cuts before the regular season and signed him to their practice squad. The Hamilton Tiger-Cats signed Ali in July 1990, but he was never activated to play with the Tiger-Cats. Ali went on to play eight games with the Calgary Stampeders during the 1990 season between stints on the Stampeders' practice roster. He spent time on the practice squads of the Blue Bombers in 1991 and the Ottawa Rough Riders in 1993. Ali received a tryout for the Ottawa Rough Riders in 1994 but did not make the team.

== Later life and death ==
Ali worked as a financial planner of the Investors Group after finishing his career in the CFL. After retiring from professional football, Ali played rugby union for the Ottawa Beavers of the Ontario Rugby Union (1997–1999) and the Ottawa Harlequins of the Rugby Canada Super League (2000).

Ali died from complications from amyotrophic lateral sclerosis on December 2, 2025, at the age of 59.
