= Wayne Drinkwalter =

Canadian football player (born 1966)

No. 77, 64, 51
- Position: Defensive lineman

Personal information
- Born: April 23, 1966 (age 60); Thunder Bay, Ontario, Canada
- Listed height: 6 ft 3 in (1.91 m)
- Listed weight: 265 lb (120 kg)

Career information
- CJFL: Thunder Bay Giants
- CFL draft: 1989: 3rd round, 19th overall pick

Career history
- 1989: Hamilton Tiger-Cats
- 1989–1995: Saskatchewan Roughriders
- 1996: Calgary Stampeders
- 1997: BC Lions

Awards and highlights
- Grey Cup champion (1989)

Wayne Drinkwalter (born April 23, 1966) is a Canadian former professional football defensive lineman who played nine seasons in the Canadian Football League (CFL) with the Saskatchewan Roughriders, Calgary Stampeders and BC Lions. He was selected by the Hamilton Tiger-Cats in the third round of the 1989 CFL draft.

== Early life ==
Wayne Drinkwalter was born on April 23, 1966, in Thunder Bay, Ontario. He did not play college football and instead played for the Thunder Bay Giants of the Canadian Junior Football League (CJFL).

== Professional career ==
Drinkwalter was selected by the Hamilton Tiger-Cats with the nineteenth pick in the 1989 CFL draft.

He was traded to the Saskatchewan Roughriders in July 1989 for offensive lineman Darrel Harle. The Roughriders won the 77th Grey Cup against the Hamilton Tiger-Cats on November 26, 1989. He played for the Roughriders until 1995 and was released before the start of the 1996 CFL season.

Drinkwalter played for the Calgary Stampeders in 1996.

He played his final season for the BC Lions in 1997.

Drinkwalter was traded to the Winnipeg Blue Bombers for a fifth round draft pick but never played for the team.
