= Sean Foudy =

Canadian football player (born 1966)

No. 22
- Position: Defensive back

Personal information
- Born: October 25, 1966 (age 60); Toronto, Ontario, Canada
- Listed height: 6 ft 3 in (1.91 m)
- Listed weight: 193 lb (88 kg)

Career information
- University: York
- CFL draft: 1989: 3rd round, 17th overall pick

Career history

Playing
- 1989–1992: Ottawa Rough Riders
- 1993–1994: BC Lions

Coaching
- 2014–2014: York Lions

Awards and highlights
- Grey Cup champion (1994)

Sean Foudy (born October 25, 1966) is a Canadian former professional football defensive back who played six seasons in the Canadian Football League (CFL) with the Ottawa Rough Riders and BC Lions. He was selected by the Rough Riders in the third round of the 1989 CFL draft. He played CIS football at York University.

== College career ==
Foudy participated in football and track for the York Lions from 1986 to 1991. He helped the track team win silver and bronze team medals at the national championships and, individually, he won four CIAU and five OUAA medals in the 60m hurdles and relays. He also earned second-team all-star honors in football in 1988. Foudy was named York’s male athlete of the year in 1989 and was inducted into the York University Sport Hall of Fame in 2006.

== Professional career ==
Foudy was selected by the Ottawa Rough Riders of the CFL with the 17th pick in the 1989 CFL draft. He played for the Rough Riders from 1989 to 1992. He played for the CFL's BC Lions from 1993 to 1994, winning the 82nd Grey Cup in 1994. Foudy retired in 1994 after only playing in 13 regular season games the previous two years due to injuries, including seven shoulder dislocations.

== Coaching career ==
Foudy became special teams coordinator of the York Lions in 2014.

== Personal life ==
Foudy is married to former sprinter France Gareau. His sons Liam and Jean-Luc have both played in the NHL.
