= List of Canadian Football League records (team) =

This is a list of Canadian Football League regular season records by teams that played in the Canadian Football League as well as the Interprovincial Rugby Football Union and the Western Interprovincial Football Union that preceded it.

== Streaks ==
Longest winning streak, overall

- Calgary Stampeders 22 (Aug 25, 1948 to Oct 15, 1949)
- Edmonton Eskimos 14 (Oct 16, 1954 to Sep 26, 1955)
- BC Lions 14 (Oct 17, 2004 to Sep 17, 2005)
- Calgary Stampeders 14 (Jul 21, 2016 to Oct 21, 2016)
- Winnipeg Blue Bombers 12 (Aug 3, 2001 to Oct 20, 2001)

Longest winning streak, home

- Calgary Stampeders 27 (Sep 20, 1992 to Aug 6, 1995)
- Montreal Alouettes 20 (Nov 8, 1953 to Oct 20, 1956)
- Edmonton Eskimos 17 (Oct 4, 1954 to Sep 22, 1956)
- Toronto Argonauts 17 (Jul 17, 1996 to Oct 18, 1997)
- Calgary Stampeders 17 (Oct 31, 2015 to Sept 29, 2017)

Longest winning streak, away

- Winnipeg Blue Bombers 20 (Aug 11, 1960 to Sep 24, 1962)
- Calgary Stampeders 13 (Sep 3, 1948 to Aug 26, 1950)
- Winnipeg Blue Bombers 9 (Sep 15, 1951 to Oct 4, 1952)
- Saskatchewan Roughriders 9 (Sep 10, 1969 to Aug 26, 1970)
- Ottawa Rough Riders 8 (Nov 6, 1948 to Sep 9, 1950)
- BC Lions 8 (Sept 28, 1984, to Sept 20, 1985)
- Calgary Stampeders 8 (Nov 5, 1994 to Oct 9, 1995)
- BC Lions 8 (Oct 4, 1998, to Sept 12, 1999)
- Montreal Alouettes 8 (Sept 23, 2023 to Aug 16, 2024)

Longest unbeaten streak, overall

- Calgary Stampeders 22–0–0 (Aug 25, 1948 to Oct 15, 1949)
- Calgary Stampeders 15–0–1 (Jul 1, 2016 to Oct 21, 2016)
- Edmonton Eskimos 14–0–1 (Jul 26, 1981 to Jul 17, 1982)
- Edmonton Eskimos 14–0–0 (Oct 16, 1954 to Oct 1, 1955)
- BC Lions 14–0–0 (Oct 17, 2004 to Sep 17, 2005)

Longest winning streak, in one regular season

- Calgary Stampeders 14 (2016)
- Calgary Stampeders 12 (1948)
- Winnipeg Blue Bombers 12 (2001)
- BC Lions 11 (2005)
- Calgary Stampeders 11 (2017)

Longest winning streak, to start regular season

- Calgary Stampeders 12 (1948)
- BC Lions 11 (2005)
- Edmonton Eskimos 10 (1955)
- Winnipeg Blue Bombers 10 (1960)

Longest winning streak, to end regular season

- Calgary Stampeders 12 (1948)
- Hamilton Tiger-Cats 10 (1972)
- Edmonton Eskimos 8 (1982)
- BC Lions 8 (2007)
- Edmonton Eskimos 8 (2015)

Longest losing streak, overall

- Ottawa Senators/Rough Riders 25 (Nov 10, 1928 to Nov 12, 1932)
- Ottawa Redblacks 22 (Sept 12, 2025 to Oct 16, 2026)
- Hamilton Wildcats 16 (Oct 17, 1948 to Nov 5, 1949)
- Shreveport Pirates 14 (Jul 6, 1994 to Oct 8, 1994)
- BC Lions 13 (Oct 19, 1957 to Sep 29, 1958)
- Edmonton Eskimos 13 (Sep 21, 1963 to Aug 28, 1964)
- Winnipeg Blue Bombers 13 (Aug 18, 1964 to Nov 1, 1964)
- Ottawa Rough Riders 13 (Jul 19, 1987 to Oct 24, 1987)
- Hamilton Tiger-Cats 13 (Oct 27, 2002 to Sep 6, 2003)
- Montreal Alouettes 13 (Aug 19, 2017 to Jun 22, 2018)
- Edmonton Elks 13 (Oct 1, 2022 to Aug 10, 2023)

Longest losing streak, to start regular season

- Ottawa Redblacks 16 (Jun 6, 2026 to Oct 2, 2026)
- Shreveport Pirates 14 (Jul 6, 1994 to Oct 8, 1994)
- Hamilton Wildcats 12 (Sep 3, 1949 to Nov 5, 1949)
- Saskatchewan Roughriders 12 (Jul 11, 1979 to Oct 7, 1979)
- Hamilton Tiger-Cats 12 (Jun 20, 2003 to Sep 6, 2003)

Longest losing streak, to end regular season

- Winnipeg Blue Bombers 13 (Aug 18, 1964 to Nov 1, 1964)
- Hamilton Wildcats 12 (Sep 3, 1949 to Nov 5, 1949)
- Montreal Alouettes 11 (Aug 19, 2017 to Nov 3, 2017)
- Ottawa Redblacks 11 (Aug 9, 2019 to Nov 1, 2019)

Longest losing streak, home

- Edmonton Eskimos/Elks 22 (October 26, 2019 to August 10, 2023)
- Ottawa Rough Riders 14 (Jul 19, 1987 to Oct 8, 1988)
- Ottawa Redblacks 13 (Oct 16, 2021 to June 15, 2023)
- Ottawa Rough Riders 12 (Oct 13, 1928 to Nov 5, 1932)
- Ottawa Redblacks 11 (July 5, 2019 to Sep 22, 2021)
- Ottawa Redblacks 11 (Sep 20, 2025 to Oct 2, 2026)

Longest losing streak, away

- Montreal Alouettes 22 (Oct 5, 1980 to Sep 5, 1983)
- Toronto Argonauts 18 (Jul 9, 1992 to Nov 7, 1993)
- Ottawa Rough Riders 18 (Oct 1, 1994 to Aug 24, 1996)
- Ottawa Rough Riders 15 (Aug 27, 1988 to Oct 15, 1989)
- Saskatchewan Roughriders 14 (Oct 9, 1998 to Aug 3, 2000)

Most consecutive seasons, 10+ wins

- Edmonton Eskimos 13 (1985 to 1997)
- Calgary Stampeders 12 (1989 to 2000)
- Calgary Stampeders 12 (2008 to 2019)
- Winnipeg Blue Bombers 9 (2016 to 2025)
- BC Lions 7 (2002 to 2008)
- Winnipeg Blue Bombers 6 (1957 to 1962)

Most consecutive seasons, above .500

- Edmonton Eskimos 14 (1984 to 1997)
- Calgary Stampeders 14 (2008 to 2022)
- Calgary Stampeders 12 (1989 to 2000)
- Edmonton Eskimos 11 (1972 to 1982)
- Toronto Argonauts 11 (1933 to 1947)

Most consecutive seasons, .500 or better

- Edmonton Eskimos 27 (1972 to 1998)
- Saskatchewan Roughriders 16 (1962 to 1977)
- Toronto Argonauts 15 (1929 to 1947)
- Calgary Stampeders 14 (2008 to 2022)
- Edmonton Eskimos 12 (1950 to 1961)
- BC Lions 12 (1977 to 1988)
- Calgary Stampeders 12 (1989 to 2000)

Most consecutive seasons, .500 or less

- Ottawa Rough Riders/Renegades/Redblacks 22 (1980 to 1996, 2002 to 2005, 2014)
- BC Lions 12 (1965 to 1976)
- Calgary Stampeders 12 (1950 to 1961)
- Toronto Argonauts 8 (1974 to 1981)

Most consecutive playoffs appearances

			West	East	North	South
34	**Edmonton Eskimos	1972-2005	33	0	1	0
20	^BC Lions	1997-2016	16	4	0	0
19	Montreal Alouettes	1996-2014	0	19	0	0
18	Calgary Stampeders	2005-2023	18	0	0	0
17	^^Winnipeg Blue Bombers	1980-1996	8	8	0	1

*Active Streak

**In 1995, Edmonton was in the North Division.

^BC was in the West Division for all 20 years, but qualified for the Crossover to the East Division Playoffs in 1997, 2003, 2009, and 2014.

^^Winnipeg was in the East Division from 1987 to 1994. In 1995, Winnipeg was in the North Division, but qualified for the Crossover to the South Division Playoffs.

=== Most consecutive Grey Cup appearances ===
- 6 - Edmonton Eskimos (1977 to 1982)
- 5 - Regina Roughriders (1928 to 1932)
- 5 - Hamilton Tiger-Cats (1961 to 1965)
- 5 - Winnipeg Blue Bombers (2019 to 2024)

=== Most consecutive Grey Cup wins ===
- 5 - Edmonton Eskimos (1978 to 1982)
- 3 - University of Toronto Varsity Blues (1909 to 1911)
- 3 - Queen's University (1922 to 1924)
- 3 - Toronto Argonauts (1945 to 1947)
- 3 - Edmonton Eskimos (1954 to 1956)

== Standings ==
Most wins, season

- Edmonton Eskimos 16 (1989)
- Toronto Argonauts 16 (2023)
- Calgary Stampeders 15 (1993, 1994, 1995, 2014, 2016)
- Baltimore Stallions 15 (1995)
- Toronto Argonauts 15 (1996, 1997)
- Montreal Alouettes 15 (2009)
- Hamilton Tiger-Cats 15 (2019)
- Winnipeg Blue Bombers 15 (2022)

Highest winning percentage (minimum 12-game season)

- Calgary Stampeders 1.000 (12–0–0) (1948)
- Calgary Stampeders .929 (13–1–0) (1949)
- Ottawa Rough Riders .917 (11–1–0) (1949)
- Edmonton Eskimos .906 (14–1–1) (1981)
- Edmonton Eskimos .889 (16–2–0) (1989)
- Toronto Argonauts .889 (16–2–0) (2023)

Most losses, season

- Hamilton Tiger-Cats 17 (2003)
- Ottawa Redblacks 17 (2026)
- Ottawa Rough Riders 16 (1988)
- Hamilton Tiger-Cats 16 (1997)
- Ottawa Redblacks 16 (2014)

== Scoring ==
Most points for in a season

- Calgary Stampeders 698 (1994)
- Toronto Argonauts 689 (1990)
- Edmonton Eskimos 671 (1991)
- BC Lions 661 (1991)
- Toronto Argonauts 660 (1997)

Most points allowed in a season

- Saskatchewan Roughriders 710 (1991)
- Ottawa Rough Riders 685 (1995)
- BC Lions 667 (1992)
- Shreveport Pirates 662 (1994)
- Winnipeg Blue Bombers 653 (1995)

Fewest points allowed in a seasons (minimum 12 games) Note: Touchdowns were worth 5 points instead of 6 prior to 1956

- Calgary Stampeders 61 (1948)
- Calgary Stampeders 77 (1949)
- Saskatchewan Roughriders 102 (1949)
- Ottawa Rough Riders 103 (1947)
- Edmonton Eskimos 117 (1955)

Fewest points allowed (minimum 18 games)

- Edmonton Eskimos 302 (1989)
- Montreal Alouettes 324 (2009)
- Toronto Argonauts 326 (1988)
- Toronto Argonauts 327 (1997)
- Toronto Argonauts 336 (2007)

Most points scored, one team, one game

- Montreal Alouettes 82 vs Hamilton (14) (Oct 20, 1956)
- Toronto Argonauts 70 vs Calgary (18) (Sep 20, 1990)
- Toronto Argonauts 68 vs BC (43, had combined single game scoring record of 111 points) (Sep 1, 1990)
- Winnipeg Blue Bombers 68 vs Hamilton (14) (Oct 19, 1991)
- Edmonton Eskimos 68^ vs Winnipeg (7) (Nov 10, 1996)

^ - Western semi-final

Most points scored, losing team, one game

- Edmonton Eskimos 52* vs Saskatchewan (54) (Oct 28, 2000)
- Montreal Alouettes 51** at Saskatchewan (54) (Jul 1, 2010)
- Las Vegas Posse 50*** at Ottawa (54) (Sep 3, 1994)
- Winnipeg Blue Bombers 49 at Edmonton (51) (Jul 21, 2000)

Notes:

- Score at the end of regulation was tied 30-30, Saskatchewan outscored Edmonton 24-22 in overtime
  - Score at the end of regulation was tied 40-40, Saskatchewan outscored Montreal 14-11 in overtime
    - Score at the end of regulation was tied 44-44, Ottawa outscored Las Vegas 10-7 in overtime

Fewest points scored, winning team, one game

- Montreal Alouettes 1 vs Ottawa (0) (Oct 30, 1966)

Largest victory margin

- Montreal Alouettes 82 vs Hamilton 14 (+68) (Oct 20, 1956)
- Edmonton Eskimos 63 vs Ottawa 3 (+60) (Aug 27, 1995)
- Calgary Stampeders 60 vs Hamilton 1 (+59) (Jul 29, 2017)
- Winnipeg Blue Bombers 58 vs Montreal 2 (+56) (Aug 8, 1981)
- Winnipeg Blue Bombers 56 vs Saskatchewan 0 (+56) (Jul 5, 1986)

Largest shutout

- Winnipeg Blue Bombers 56 vs Saskatchewan 0 (Jul 5, 1986)
- Edmonton Eskimos 55 vs Saskatchewan 0 (Aug 24, 1959)
- Toronto Argonauts 53 vs Winnipeg 0 (Oct 8, 1967)
- Saskatchewan Roughriders 52 vs Winnipeg 0 (Sep 2, 2012)
