= 2008 Edmonton Eskimos season =

Canadian football team season

- General manager: Danny Maciocia
- Head coach: Danny Maciocia
- Home stadium: Commonwealth Stadium

Results
- Record: 10–8
- Division place: 4th, West
- Playoffs: Lost East Final
- Team MOP: Ricky Ray, QB
- Team MOC: Kamau Peterson, WR
- Team MOR: Tristan Jackson, KR/DB

Uniform

The 2008 Edmonton Eskimos season was the 51st season for the team in the Canadian Football League (CFL) and their 60th overall. The Eskimos finished fourth in the West Division, but made the playoffs because of the "crossover" rule. Edmonton became the first West team to win the East Semi-Final. The Eskimos attempted to win their 14th Grey Cup championship, but they lost the East Final to the Montreal Alouettes.

== Offseason ==
=== CFL draft ===
In the 2008 CFL Draft, 48 players were chosen from among 752 eligible players from Canadian universities across the country, as well as Canadian players playing in the NCAA. The first two rounds were broadcast on TSN.ca with host Rod Black.

Round	Pick	Player	Position	School/club team
2	11 (via Calgary)	Greg Wojt	OL	Central Michigan
3	19 (via Calgary)	Tim St. Pierre	LB	Saint Mary's
3	23 (via BC Lions via Winnipeg)	Justin Cooper	DL	Manitoba
4	25 (via Hamilton)	Sammy Okpro	DB	Concordia
4	26	Jonathan Hood	DB	St.FX
5	34	Dante Luciani	REC	Laurier

=== Transactions ===
Date	Type	Incoming	Outgoing	Team
February 8, 2008	Trade	Fred Perry (DE); *2nd-round pick in 2008 CFL draft – Fernand Kashama (DE)	Steven Jyles (QB); 2nd-round pick in 2008 CFL draft – Jonathan St-Pierre (OL)	Saskatchewan Roughriders
February 13, 2008	Trade	Brock Ralph (WR)	Michael Botterill (LB); Chris Thompson (LB)	Hamilton Tiger-Cats
February 15, 2008	Trade	Jordan Younger (DB)	Tyler Ebell (RB); T. J. Acree (WR)	Toronto Argonauts
March 20, 2008	Trade	Rob Pikula (K/P); 3rd-round pick in 2008 CFL draft – Justin Cooper (DL)	3rd-round pick in 2008 CFL draft – Justin Shaw (DL)	British Columbia Lions
April 30, 2008	Trade	John Comiskey (OL); Kevin Challenger (WR); 2nd-round pick in 2008 CFL draft – Greg Wojt (OL); 3rd-round pick in 2008 CFL draft – Tim St. Pierre (OL)	1st-round pick in 2008 CFL draft – Dimitri Tsoumpas (OL); 2nd-round pick in 2008 CFL draft – Fernand Kashama (DE)	Calgary Stampeders
May 27, 2008	Trade	Duncan O'Mahony (P)	4th-round pick in 2009 CFL draft – Spencer Armstrong (WR)	Calgary Stampeders
May 31, 2008	Trade	Noel Prefontaine (K/P)	**1st-round pick in 2009 CFL draft – James Yurichuk (LB); 2nd-round pick in 2010 CFL draft – Grant Shaw (DB/K)	Toronto Argonauts

- *Later traded to the Calgary Stampeders
- **Later traded to the BC Lions

== Preseason ==
=== Schedule ===
#	Date	Visitor	Score	Home	OT	Attendance	Record	Pts
A	June 13	Edmonton Eskimos	14–39	Calgary Stampeders		27,580	0–1	0
B	June 19	Saskatchewan Roughriders	7–37	Edmonton Eskimos		33,508	1–1	2

== Roster ==
2008 Edmonton Eskimos final roster
Quarterbacks: 17 Stefan LeFors; 12 Jason Maas; 15 Ricky Ray; Running backs: 30 Mathieu Bertrand; 22 Chris Ciezki; 34 A. J. Harris; 19 Mike Maurer; 31 Calvin McCarty; 35 Pierre-Luc Yao; Receivers: 71 Kelly Campbell; 84 Kevin Challenger; 86 Maurice Mann; 88 Andrew Nowacki; 8 Kamau Peterson; 2 Fred Stamps	Offensive linemen: 59 Calvin Armstrong G/T; 64 Tim Bakker C/T; 67 Dan Comiskey G; 62 John Comiskey C; 66 Garrick Jones T; 56 Patrick Kabongo G; Defensive linemen: 90 Adrian Baird DE; 92 Tyler Clutts DE; 97 Justin Cooper DE; 41 Brandon Guillory DE; 95 Montez Murphy DE; 94 Dario Romero DT; 79 Eric Taylor DT; 93 Clinton Wayne DT; Special teams: 52 Taylor Inglis LS; 7 Noel Prefontaine K/P	Linebackers: 39 Agustín Barrenechea; 24 Scott Coe; 44 Kenny Onatolu; 41 Fred Perry; 28 Siddeeq Shabazz; 48 Tim St. Pierre; Defensive backs: 25 Jonté Buhl; 23 Shannon Garrett; 4 Jason Goss; 38 Tristan Jackson; 9 Lenny Williams; 26 Jordan Younger; Reserve roster: 51 Aaron Fiacconi C; 82 Greg Prator SB; 16 Bradley Robinson DB; 75 Derek Schiavone K/P	Practice roster: 57 Thaddeus Coleman T; 27 Airabin Justin DB; 89 Dante Luciani WR; 5 Ron McClendon RB; 10 Sammy Okpro DB; 85 Jamaica Rector WR; 3 Trey Young DB; Injured list: 32 Damien Anderson RB; 91 Adam Braidwood DE; 90 Jim Davis DE/DT; 45 Derrick Doggett LB; 43 J. R. LaRose DB; 63 Joe McGrath T; 80 Brock Ralph WR; 20 Wale Dada DB; 83 Jason Tucker SB; Suspended: -- Tremayne Kirkland WR; Italics indicate American player. Roster updated 2026-04-14

== Regular season ==
=== Season standings ===
West Division
Pos	Team	Pld	W	L	T	PF	PA	PD	Pts
1	Calgary Stampeders (C, Q)	18	13	5	0	595	420	+175	26
2	Saskatchewan Roughriders (Q)	18	12	6	0	500	471	+29	24
3	BC Lions (Q)	18	11	7	0	559	479	+80	22
4	Edmonton Eskimos (Q)	18	10	8	0	512	536	−24	20

Source: "2008 Regular Season Standings". Canadian Football League. Archived from the original on 2009-02-05.
(C) First round bye; (Q) Qualified for playoffs

=== Season schedule ===
Week	Date	Visitor	Score	Home	OT	Attendance	Record	Pts
1	June 28	Edmonton Eskimos	13–34	Saskatchewan Roughriders		28,800	0–1–0	0
2	July 3	Calgary Stampeders	31–34	Edmonton Eskimos		32,706	1–1–0	2
3	July 10	Toronto Argonauts	28–47	Edmonton Eskimos		31,707	2–1–0	4
4	July 20	Edmonton Eskimos	31–35	Toronto Argonauts		28,522	2–2–0	4
5	July 25	Edmonton Eskimos	19–13	Hamilton Tiger-Cats		21,402	3–2–0	6
6	July 31	BC Lions	24–35	Edmonton Eskimos		35,008	4–2–0	8
7	August 8	Edmonton Eskimos	34–40	BC Lions		30,863	4–3–0	8
8	Bye						4–3–0	8
9	August 21	Saskatchewan Roughriders	10–27	Edmonton Eskimos		48,808	5–3–0	10
10	September 1	Edmonton Eskimos	37–16	Calgary Stampeders		35,650	6–3–0	12
11	September 5	Calgary Stampeders	38–33	Edmonton Eskimos		46,014	6–4–0	12
12	September 13	Hamilton Tiger-Cats	33–38	Edmonton Eskimos		37,500	7–4–0	14
13	September 21	Edmonton Eskimos	4–40	Montreal Alouettes		20,202	7–5–0	14
14	September 26	Edmonton Eskimos	23–30	Winnipeg Blue Bombers		29,794	7–6–0	14
15	October 4	Winnipeg Blue Bombers	22–36	Edmonton Eskimos		40,453	8–6–0	16
16	October 10	Edmonton Eskimos	27–20	BC Lions		34,778	9–6–0	18
17	October 17	BC Lions	43–28	Edmonton Eskimos		34,342	9–7–0	18
18	October 25	Edmonton Eskimos	9–55	Saskatchewan Roughriders		30,945	9–8–0	18
19	October 31	Montreal Alouettes	14–37	Edmonton Eskimos		29,911	10–8–0	20

Total attendance: 336,449
Average attendance: 37,383 (62.8%)

=== Ron Lancaster ===
On Thursday, September 18, Ron Lancaster, 69, died from an apparent heart attack, less than two months after being diagnosed with lung cancer. Despite working in television, Lancaster returned to football as the Eskimos' head coach in 1991. During his seven-season tenure as Edmonton's head coach, the Eskimos won the 1993 Grey Cup. Lancaster resigned as the Eskimos' head coach after the 1997 season to become the Hamilton Tiger-Cats' head coach and director of football operations.

== Player stats ==
= Indicates team leader

=== Passing ===
Player	GP	Att	Comp	%	Yds	LG	TDs	INT	Rating
Ricky Ray (QB)	18	605	422	69.8	5,661	66	26	17	101.8
Jason Maas (QB)	3	44	26	59.1	340	80	0	1	74.1
Noel Prefontaine (K/P)	1	1	1	100.0	19	19	0	0	158.3
Stefan LeFors (QB)	17	4	1	25.0	9	9	0	1	71.9

=== Rushing ===
Player	GP	Att	Yds	LG	Avg.	TD	Fumbles
A. J. Harris (RB)	11	99	557	36	5.6	6	1
Calvin McCarty (RB)	18	88	490	34	5.6	4	4
Ricky Ray (QB)	18	75	258	15	3.4	5	13
Ronald McClendon (RB)	2	13	64	19	4.9	1	0
Damien Anderson (RB)	2	17	57	16	3.4	0	1
Jason Maas (QB)	3	3	30	16	10.0	0	1
Mathieu Bertrand (FB)	17	13	28	4	2.2	4	0
Tristan Jackson (CB)	17	2	18	13	9.0	0	3
Kamau Peterson (SB)	18	1	13	13	13.0	0	0
Noel Prefontaine (K/P)	17	1	10	10	10.0	0	0
Kelly Campbell (WR)	15	1	6	6	6.0	0	0
Stefan LeFors (QB)	1	1	2	2	2.0	0	0
Kamau Peterson (SB)	18	0	0	0	0.0	0	3
Tyler Clutts (DE)	18	0	0	0	0.0	0	1
Jason Goss (HB)	17	0	0	0	0.0	0	3
Noel Prefontaine (K/P)	17	0	0	0	0.0	0	3
Kelly Campbell (WR)	15	0	0	0	0.0	0	3
Andrew Nowacki (WR)	13	0	0	0	0.0	0	1

=== Receiving ===
Player	GP	No.	Yds	Avg.	LG	TD
Kamau Peterson (SB)	18	101	1,315	13.0	66	4
Kelly Campbell (WR)	15	54	1,223	22.6	53	7
Fred Stamps (SB)	14	50	751	15.0	46	6
Calvin McCarty (RB)	18	70	583	8.3	27	1
A. J. Harris (RB)	11	37	422	11.4	39	0
Maurice Mann (SB)	7	31	420	13.5	44	4
Andrew Nowacki (WR)	13	28	369	13.2	31	2
Jason Tucker (WR)	5	14	235	16.8	36	2
Kevin Challenger (WR)	5	8	166	20.8	80	0
Brock Ralph (WR)	6	13	164	12.6	46	0
Mathieu Bertrand (FB)	17	22	161	7.3	29	0
Greg Prator (WR)	3	7	96	13.7	27	0
Ronald McClendon (RB)	2	8	67	8.4	14	0
Damien Anderson (RB)	2	7	57	8.1	15	0

=== Defence ===
Player	GP	TKL	STT	KD	Sacks	Ints	Int Yds	Int LG	Int TD	Fumb R.	Fumb Yds	Fumb LG	Fumb TD	Fumb F.
Agustin Barrenechea (LB)	18	68	2	1	3	2	16	12	0	0	0	0	0	0
Siddeeq Shabazz (LB)	18	63	6	0	3	1	4	4	0	1	3	3	0	2
Kenny Onatolu (LB)	14	60	8	3	3	0	0	0	0	2	3	3	0	1
Jason Goss (HB)	17	52	0	6	1	5	182	94	2	3	55	34	0	0
Jordan Younger (CB)	15	52	0	8	0	1	5	5	0	0	0	0	0	0
Jonté Buhl (CB/HB)	16	49	4	4	1	4	46	27	0	0	0	0	0	0
Shannon Garrett (DB)	18	45	1	4	1	1	30	30	0	1	25	25	1	0
Keith Williams (DB)	6	36	1	1	0	1	9	9	0	1	0	0	0	1
Lenny Williams (HB)	9	35	2	1	0	2	23	16	0	0	0	0	0	3
Dario Romero (DT)	16	30	0	0	6	0	0	0	0	1	0	0	0	1
Jim Davis (DE)	14	26	0	3	6	0	0	0	0	0	0	0	0	1
Montez Murphy (DE)	12	24	0	4	3	0	0	0	0	0	0	0	0	0
Brandon Guillory (DE)	13	21	0	2	6	0	0	0	0	0	0	0	0	0
Tyler Clutts (DE)	18	21	16	2	0	0	0	0	0	1	2	2	0	0
Fred Perry (DE)	7	17	0	1	1	0	0	0	0	1	0	0	0	1
Eric Taylor (DT)	6	17	0	1	1	0	0	0	0	1	0	0	0	0
Bradley Robinson (DB)	7	14	1	2	0	3	52	30	0	0	0	0	0	0
Tristan Jackson (CB)	17	11	1	4	0	2	123	89	1	0	0	0	0	1
Joe Anoa'i (DT)	3	9	0	0	0	0	0	0	0	0	0	0	0	1
Scott Coe (LB)	12	6	1	1	0	0	0	0	0	0	0	0	0	0
Darrell Robertson (LB)	2	6	0	1	0	0	0	0	0	0	0	0	0	0
Trey Young (LB)	2	5	0	0	0	1	0	0	0	0	0	0	0	1
Kamau Peterson (SB)	18	4	0	0	0	0	0	0	0	0	0	0	0	0
Wale Dada (CB)	3	4	1	0	0	0	0	0	0	0	0	0	0	0
Calvin Armstrong (OG)	17	4	0	0	0	0	0	0	0	0	0	0	0	0
A. J. Harris (RB)	11	4	0	0	0	0	0	0	0	0	0	0	0	0
Calvin McCarty (RB)	18	3	11	0	0	0	0	0	0	0	0	0	0	0
Patrick Kabongo (OG)	18	2	0	0	0	0	0	0	0	0	0	0	0	0
Ricky Ray (QB)	18	2	0	0	0	0	0	0	0	0	0	0	0	0
John Comiskey (OG)	18	2	0	0	0	0	0	0	0	0	0	0	0	0
Patrick Kabongo (OG)	18	2	0	0	0	0	0	0	0	0	0	0	0	0
Kelly Campbell (WR)	15	2	0	0	0	0	0	0	0	0	0	0	0	0
Brock Ralph (WR)	6	2	0	0	0	0	0	0	0	0	0	0	0	0
Justin Cooper (DE)	18	1	12	0	0	0	0	0	0	0	0	0	0	0
Pierre-Luc Yao (RB)	18	1	8	0	0	0	0	0	0	0	0	0	0	0
Mathieu Bertrand (FB)	17	1	21	0	0	0	0	0	0	0	0	0	0	0
Andrew Nowacki (WR)	13	1	1	0	0	0	0	0	0	0	0	0	0	0
Fred Stamps (SB)	14	1	0	0	0	0	0	0	0	0	0	0	0	0
Dan Comiskey (C)	8	1	0	0	0	0	0	0	0	0	0	0	0	0
Maurice Mann (SB)	7	1	0	0	0	0	0	0	0	0	0	0	0	0
Jason Tucker (WR)	5	1	0	0	0	0	0	0	0	0	0	0	0	0
Jason Maas (QB)	3	1	0	0	0	0	0	0	0	0	0	0	0	0
Chris Ciezki (FB)	18	0	24	0	0	0	0	0	0	2	4	4	0	1
Adrian Baird (DE)	18	0	14	0	0	0	0	0	0	0	0	0	0	2
Derrick Doggett (LB)	4	0	7	0	0	0	0	0	0	0	0	0	0	0
Noel Prefontaine (K/P)	17	0	5	0	0	0	0	0	0	0	0	0	0	0
Taylor Inglis (LS)	18	0	4	0	0	0	0	0	0	0	0	0	0	0
Tim St. Pierre (LB)	18	0	3	0	0	0	0	0	0	0	0	0	0	0
Mike Maurer (FB)	2	0	3	0	0	0	0	0	0	0	0	0	0	0
J. R. LaRose (DB)	8	0	2	1	0	0	0	0	0	0	0	0	0	0
Kevin Challenger (WR)	18	0	1	0	0	0	0	0	0	0	0	0	0	0

=== Kickoffs ===
Player	GP	KO Att.	Yds	KO Avg.	LG	Singles
Noel Prefontaine (K/P)	17	77	4,636	60.2	73	0
Derek Schiavone (K/P)	1	5	258	51.6	53	0

=== Kicking ===
Player	GP	FG	FG Att.	FG%	LG	SG	XP	XP Att.	XP%	PTS
Noel Prefontaine (K/P)	17	35	46	76.1	54	7	48	48	100.0	160
Derek Schiavone (K/P)	1	3	3	100.0	28	0	4	4	100.0	13
Calvin McCarty (RB)	18	0	1	0.0	0	0	0	0	0.0	1

=== Punting ===
Player	GP	Punts	Yds	Avg.	SG	LG
Noel Prefontaine (K/P)	17	103	4,831	46.9	11	75
Derek Schiavone (K/P)	1	3	109	36.3	0	41

=== Returning ===
Player	GP	K. Ret.	KR Yds	KR Avg.	KR TD	KR LG	P. Ret.	PR Yds	PR Avg.	PR TD	PR LG	MFG Ret.	MFG Yds	MFG Avg.	MFG LG	MFG TD
Tristan Jackson (CB)	17	35	839	24.0	1	94	79	809	10.2	2	67	5	142	28.4	64	0
Fred Stamps (SB)	14	14	297	21.2	0	49	0	0	0.0	0	0	0	0	0.0	0	0
Kelly Campbell (WR)	15	13	291	22.4	0	51	1	0	0.0	0	0	0	0	0.0	0	0
Tyler Clutts (DE)	18	6	37	6.2	0	12	0	0	0.0	0	0	0	0	0.0	0	0
Lenny Williams (HB)	9	4	99	24.8	0	39	0	0	0.0	0	0	0	0	0.0	0	0
Bradley Robinson (DB)	7	4	59	14.8	0	24	6	33	5.5	0	9	0	0	0.0	0	0
Damien Anderson (RB)	2	3	56	18.7	0	20	0	0	0.0	0	0	0	0	0.0	0	0
Mathieu Bertrand (FB)	17	3	34	11.3	0	16	0	0	0.0	0	0	0	0	0.0	0	0
Jason Goss (HB)	17	0	0	0.0	0	0	1	5	5.0	0	5	0	0	0.0	0	0

== Awards and records ==
- Kamau Peterson (WR), Edmonton Eskimos – CFL's Most Outstanding Canadian Award
- Ricky Ray, Led CFL, Passing Yards (5,861)
- Ricky Ray, Led West Division, Passing Attempts (605)
- Ricky Ray, Led West Division, Passing Completions (422)
- Ricky Ray, Led CFL, Passing Completion (69.8%)

=== All-Star selections ===
- Patrick Kabongo, CFL Western All-Star, Offence
- Kamau Peterson, CFL Western All-Star, Offence
- Dario Romero, CFL Western All-Star, Defence

== Playoffs ==
The Eskimos advanced to the East Division playoffs as a "crossover" being that they had a better record than Toronto. By defeating Winnipeg, Edmonton became the first crossover team from the West to win an Eastern semi-final.

Week	Date	Visitor	Score	Home	OT	Attendance
Division Semi-Final	Nov 8	Edmonton Eskimos	29–21	Winnipeg Blue Bombers		27,493
Division Final	Nov 15	Edmonton Eskimos	26–36	Montreal Alouettes		38,132

=== East semi-final ===
Date and time: Saturday, November 8, 12:00 PM Central Standard Time
Venue: Canad Inns Stadium, Winnipeg, Manitoba

Team	Q1	Q2	Q3	Q4	Total
Edmonton Eskimos	3	18	8	0	29
Winnipeg Blue Bombers	8	7	0	6	21

=== East final ===
Date and time: Saturday, November 15, 1:00 PM Eastern Standard Time
Venue: Olympic Stadium, Montreal, Quebec

Team	Q1	Q2	Q3	Q4	Total
Edmonton Eskimos	7	6	0	13	26
Montreal Alouettes	3	16	10	7	36
