= 2009 Edmonton Eskimos season =

Canadian football team season

- General manager: Danny Maciocia
- Head coach: Richie Hall
- Home stadium: Commonwealth Stadium

Results
- Record: 9–9
- Division place: 3rd, West
- Playoffs: Lost West Semi-Final
- Team MOP: Fred Stamps, WR
- Team MOC: Patrick Kabongo, OL
- Team MOR: Arkee Whitlock, RB

Uniform

The 2009 Edmonton Eskimos season was the 52nd season for the team in the Canadian Football League (CFL) and their 61st overall. The Eskimos finished the season in third place with a 9–9 record. They appeared in the West Semi-Final where they lost to the Calgary Stampeders.

== Off-season ==
=== CFL draft ===
The 2009 CFL draft took place on May 2, 2009. Due to trades, the Eskimos did not have a pick until the second round, when they selected tackle Gordon Hinse, eleventh overall from the University of Alberta.

Round	Pick	Player	Position	School/Club team
2	11	Gordon Hinse	OT	Alberta
2	12	Dee Stirling	DL	Queen's
3	20	Andrea Bonaventura	LB	Calgary
5	36	Eric Lee	RB	Weber State
6	44	Jason Kosec	LB	Western Ontario

=== Notable transactions ===
Date	Type	Incoming	Outgoing	Team
January 21, 2009	Trade	2nd round pick in 2009 CFL draft – Gordon Hinse (OT); *4th round pick in 2010 CFL draft – Akeem Foster (WR)	Stefan LeFors (QB)	Winnipeg Blue Bombers
February 16, 2009	Trade	Kai Ellis (DE)	Siddeeq Shabazz (DB)	Winnipeg Blue Bombers
February 17, 2009	Trade	Jason Nugent (DB); **2nd round pick in 2010 CFL draft – Cory Watson (WR)	Brock Ralph (WR)	Winnipeg Blue Bombers
April 1, 2009	Trade	Anthony Malbrough (DB); **5th round pick in 2011 CFL draft – Carl Volny (RB)	Kelly Butler (OL)	Winnipeg Blue Bombers
May 6, 2009	Trade	Gerald Davis (OL)	Conditional pick in 2010 CFL draft	Hamilton Tiger-Cats
May 15, 2009	Trade	Kitwana Jones (LB)	Juan Joseph (QB)	Saskatchewan Roughriders
May 15, 2009	Trade	Kelly Malveaux (DB)	Fred Perry (DE)	Winnipeg Blue Bombers
June 11, 2009	Trade	Joe McGrath (OL)	*1st round pick in 2010 CFL draft – Danny Watkins (OT)	Saskatchewan Roughriders
June 15, 2009	Trade	Willie Amos (DB)	Thaddeus Coleman (OL)	Winnipeg Blue Bombers

*Later traded to the BC Lions
**Later traded back to the Winnipeg Blue Bombers

=== Pre-season ===
#	Date	Visitor	Score	Home	OT	Attendance	Record	Pts
A	June 17	Saskatchewan Roughriders	12–45	Edmonton Eskimos		34,793	1–0	2
B	June 24	Edmonton Eskimos	31–19	BC Lions		23,217	2–0	4

== Regular season ==
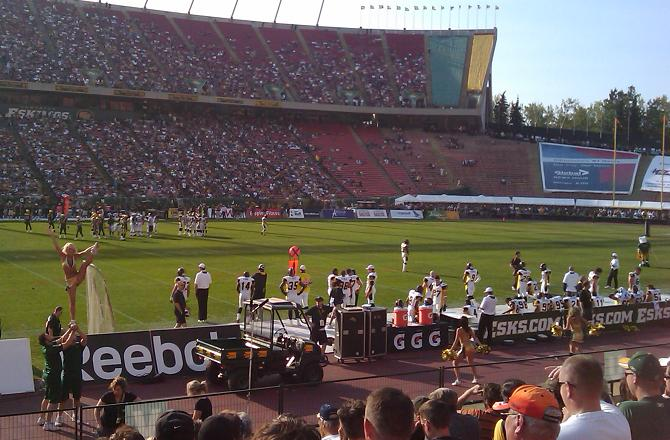
hosting Hamilton on August 29

=== Standings ===
West Division
Team	GP	W	L	T	PF	PA	Pts	
Saskatchewan Roughriders	18	10	7	1	514	484	21	Details
Calgary Stampeders	18	10	7	1	514	443	21	Details
Edmonton Eskimos	18	9	9	0	469	502	18	Details
BC Lions	18	8	10	0	431	502	16	Details

=== Season schedule ===
#	Date	Visitor	Score	Home	OT	Attendance	Record	Pts
1	July 2	Winnipeg Blue Bombers	17–19	Edmonton Eskimos		30,650	1–0–0	2
2	July 9	Edmonton Eskimos	16–50	Montreal Alouettes		20,202	1–1–0	2
3	July 16	BC Lions	40–22	Edmonton Eskimos		33,661	1–2–0	2
4	July 25	Edmonton Eskimos	38–33	Saskatchewan Roughriders		30,945	2–2–0	4
5	July 30	Montreal Alouettes	19–33	Edmonton Eskimos		33,206	3–2–0	6
6	Aug 8	Edmonton Eskimos	21–28	Hamilton Tiger-Cats		19,206	3–3–0	6
7	Aug 13	Calgary Stampeders	35–38	Edmonton Eskimos		33,065	4–3–0	8
8	Bye						4–3–0	8
9	Aug 29	Hamilton Tiger-Cats	30–31	Edmonton Eskimos		35,036	5–3–0	10
10	Sept 7	Edmonton Eskimos	8–32	Calgary Stampeders		40,729	5–4–0	10
11	Sept 11	Calgary Stampeders	35–34	Edmonton Eskimos		46,212	5–5–0	10
12	Sept 20	Edmonton Eskimos	31–27	Saskatchewan Roughriders		30,945	6–5–0	12
13	Sept 26	Saskatchewan Roughriders	23–20	Edmonton Eskimos		62,517*	6–6–0	12
14	Oct 2	Edmonton Eskimos	17–27	Winnipeg Blue Bombers		21,965	6–7–0	12
15	Oct 9	BC Lions	34–31	Edmonton Eskimos		30,120	6–8–0	12
16	Oct 16	Edmonton Eskimos	22–19	Toronto Argonauts		26,515	7–8–0	14
17	Oct 23	Edmonton Eskimos	7–30	Calgary Stampeders		35,650	7–9–0	14
18	Oct 30	Toronto Argonauts	10–36	Edmonton Eskimos		30,012	8–9–0	16
19	Nov 6	Edmonton Eskimos	45–13	BC Lions		31,515	9–9–0	18

*Top attendance in CFL

Total attendance: 334,479
Average attendance: 37,164 (62.4%)

== Roster ==
2009 Edmonton Eskimos final roster
Quarterbacks: 12 Jason Maas; 15 Ricky Ray; 5 Jared Zabransky; Running backs: 24 Graeme Bell; 30 Mathieu Bertrand; 22 Chris Ciezki; 31 Calvin McCarty; 36 Arkee Whitlock; Receivers: 81 Jason Barnes; 84 Kevin Challenger; 87 Skyler Green; 80 Efrem Hill; 88 Andrew Nowacki; 8 Kamau Peterson; 2 Fred Stamps	Offensive linemen: 59 Calvin Armstrong T; 62 John Comiskey C/T; 51 Aaron Fiacconi C; 56 Patrick Kabongo G; 61 Kyle Koch G; 63 Joe McGrath T; 50 Adam Rogers G; Defensive linemen: 93 Kai Ellis DE; 97 Justin Cooper DE; 99 Jerome Haywood DT; 90 Greg Peach DE; 96 Dee Sterling DT; 79 Eric Taylor DT	Linebackers: 40 Rod Davis; 18 T. J. Hill; 47 Maurice Lloyd; 44 Mark Restelli; 48 Tim St. Pierre; Defensive backs: 10 Randee Drew; 26 Scott Gordon; 4 Jason Goss; 20 Anthony Malbrough; 27 Kelly Malveaux; 13 Jason Nugent; 23 Byron Parker; 9 Lenny Williams	Special teams: 52 Taylor Inglis LS; 7 Noel Prefontaine K/P; Reserve roster: 6 Reggie Hunt LB; 85 Jamaica Rector WR; 17 Derek Schiavone K/P; Practice roster: 95 Justin Brown DT; 45 Frantz Joseph LB; 11 Elliott Richardson DB; 25 Ramonce Taylor RB; 77 Greg Whelan LB; 6 Gemara Williams DB; 73 Kevin Wuthrich WR	Injured list: -- Willie Amos DB; 91 Adam Braidwood DE; 39 Lamar Herron DB; 57 Gord Hinse C; 38 Tristan Jackson DB; 66 Garrick Jones T; 28 Jesse Lumsden RB; 86 Maurice Mann WR; 42 Shaun Richardson DE; 16 Bradley Robinson DB; 94 Dario Romero DT; 69 Greg Wojt T; Suspended: -- Ryan Glasper DB; 19 Mike Maurer FB; Italics indicate Import player Roster updated 2026-04-26

== Playoffs ==
=== Schedule ===
Week	Date	Visitor	Score	Home	OT	Attendance
Division Semi-Final	Nov 15	Edmonton Eskimos	21–24	Calgary Stampeders		31,356

=== Bracket ===
November 15: Division Semifinals
East
W4	BC Lions	34*
E2	Hamilton Tiger-Cats	27
West
W3	Edmonton Eskimos	21
W2	Calgary Stampeders	24

November 22: Division Finals
W4	BC Lions	18
E1	Montreal Alouettes	56
W2	Calgary Stampeders	17
W1	Saskatchewan Roughriders	27

November 29: 97th Grey Cup; McMahon Stadium – Calgary
E1	Montreal Alouettes	28
W1	Saskatchewan Roughriders	27

*-Team won in Overtime.

=== West Semi-Final ===
Date and time: Sunday, November 15, 4:30 PM Mountain Standard Time
Venue: McMahon Stadium, Calgary, Alberta

Team	Q1	Q2	Q3	Q4	Total
Edmonton Eskimos	0	7	7	7	21
Calgary Stampeders	0	9	7	8	24
