= 2007 Edmonton Eskimos season =

Canadian football team season

- General manager: Danny Maciocia
- Head coach: Danny Maciocia
- Home stadium: Commonwealth Stadium

Results
- Record: 5–12–1
- Division place: 4th, West
- Playoffs: did not qualify
- Team MOP: Ricky Ray, QB
- Team MOC: Kamau Peterson, WR
- Team MOR: Tyler Ebell, RB

Uniform

The 2007 Edmonton Eskimos season, saw the team finish fourth in the West Division with a 5–12–1 record and fail to make the playoffs. It marked the first time since 1962–65 that the team missed the playoffs in consecutive years.

== Offseason ==
=== CFL draft ===
Round	Pick	Player	Position	School/Club team
1	2	Warren Kean	K	Concordia
2	10	Jason Nedd	DB	Akron
4	26	Micheal Jean-Louis	DL	Laval
4	27	Calvin McCarty	RB	Western Washington
6	42	Forfeit Pick		

=== Transactions ===
Date	Type	Incoming	Outgoing	Team
January 15, 2007	Trade	*2nd round pick in 2007 CFL draft – Eric Ince (OL)	Glen Carson (OL)	Toronto Argonauts
February 13, 2007	Trade	Jason Goss (DB)	Richard Alston (WR); Nicolas Bisaillon (WR); Timmy Chang (QB); 2nd round pick in 2007 CFL draft – Eric Ince (OL)	Hamilton Tiger-Cats
February 23, 2007	Trade	Jon Landon (OL)	Future considerations	Toronto Argonauts
April 11, 2007	Trade	Ron Warner (DL); 4th round pick in 2007 CFL draft – Calvin McCarty (RB)	Jason Nugent (DB); **5th round pick in 2007 CFL draft – Reggie Bradshaw (RB)	Winnipeg Blue Bombers
June 13, 2007	Trade	Patrick Johnson (WR)	**2nd round pick in 2008 CFL draft – Jonathan St. Pierre (OL)	Toronto Argonauts
September 5, 2007	Trade	Aaron Fiacconi (OL)	3rd round pick in 2008 CFL draft – Daryl Stephenson (RB)	Winnipeg Blue Bombers
September 11, 2007	Trade	Agustin Barrenechea (LB); 4th round pick in 2008 CFL draft – Sammy Okpro (LB)	Jason Nedd (DB)	Hamilton Tiger-Cats

*Later traded to the Hamilton Tiger-Cats
**Later traded to the Saskatchewan Roughriders

== Preseason ==
=== Schedule ===
#	Date	Visitor	Score	Home	OT	Attendance	Record	Pts
B	June 15	Edmonton Eskimos	3–28	Calgary Stampeders		25,877	0–1	0
C	June 21	BC Lions	12–18	Edmonton Eskimos		31,650	1–1	2

== Regular season ==
=== Season standings ===
West Division
Team	GP	W	L	T	PF	PA	Pts	
BC Lions	18	14	3	1	542	379	29	Details
Saskatchewan Roughriders	18	12	6	0	530	432	24	Details
Calgary Stampeders	18	7	10	1	473	527	15	Details
Edmonton Eskimos	18	5	12	1	399	509	11	Details

=== Season schedule ===
#	Date	Visitor	Score	Home	OT	Attendance	Record	Pts
1	June 28	Winnipeg Blue Bombers	39–39	Edmonton Eskimos	OT	33,038	0–0–1	1
2	July 6	Edmonton Eskimos	9–29	BC Lions		32,893	0–1–1	1
3	July 13	Edmonton Eskimos	19–15	Winnipeg Blue Bombers		29,533	1–1–1	3
4	July 20	Saskatchewan Roughriders	20–21	Edmonton Eskimos		46,704	2–1–1	5
5	July 28	Edmonton Eskimos	14–54	Saskatchewan Roughriders		26,840	2–2–1	5
6	Aug 4	Calgary Stampeders	34–32	Edmonton Eskimos		32,644	2–3–1	5
7	Aug 11	Hamilton Tiger-Cats	17–19	Edmonton Eskimos		35,750	3–3–1	7
8	Aug 18	Edmonton Eskimos	32–39	Saskatchewan Roughriders		28,800	3–4–1	7
9	Bye						3–4–1	7
10	Sept 3	Edmonton Eskimos	24–35	Calgary Stampeders		35,650	3–5–1	7
11	Sept 7	Calgary Stampeders	20–17	Edmonton Eskimos		42,329	3–6–1	7
12	Sept 14	Montreal Alouettes	28–47	Edmonton Eskimos		36,280	4–6–1	9
13	Sept 23	Edmonton Eskimos	16–10	Montreal Alouettes		20,202	5–6–1	11
14	Sept 28	Toronto Argonauts	18–11	Edmonton Eskimos		31,056	5–7–1	11
15	October 6	Edmonton Eskimos	8–33	Toronto Argonauts		28,354	5–8–1	11
16	Oct 13	BC Lions	24–18	Edmonton Eskimos		33,663	5–9–1	11
17	Oct 20	Edmonton Eskimos	26–37	BC Lions		37,011	5–10–1	11
18	Oct 26	Saskatchewan Roughriders	36–29	Edmonton Eskimos	OT	40,127	5–11–1	11
19	Nov 3	Edmonton Eskimos	19–21	Hamilton Tiger-Cats		20,411	5–12–1	11

Total attendance: 331,591
Average attendance: 36,843 (61.3%)

== Player stats ==
= Indicates team leader

=== Passing ===
Player	Att	Comp	%	Yards	TD	RBI	Rating

=== Rushing ===
Player	Att	Yards	Avg.	TD	Fumbles

=== Receiving ===
Player	No.	Yards	Avg.	Long	TD

== Roster ==
2007 Edmonton Eskimos final roster
Quarterbacks: 7 Steven Jyles; 17 Stefan LeFors; Running backs: 32 Damien Anderson; 30 Mathieu Bertrand; 22 Mike Bradley; 19 Mike Maurer; 28 Calvin McCarty; Receivers: 85 Trevor Gaylor; 87 Mike Lindstrom; 86 Maurice Mann; 80 Quentin McCord; 88 Andrew Nowacki; 8 Kamau Peterson; 4 Jean-Francois Romeo; 82 Fred Stamps; 83 Jason Tucker	Offensive linemen: 64 Tim Bakker C; 57 Trey Darilek G/T; 51 Aaron Fiacconi G; 56 Patrick Kabongo T; 63 Joe McGrath T; 58 Raleigh Roundtree G; Defensive linemen: 92 Zach Anderson DE/DT; 94 Robert Brown DT; 49 Tim Cheatwood DE; 93 Michael Jean-Louis DT; 99 Ron Warner DE; Special teams: 11 Sean Fleming K/P; 52 Taylor Inglis LS; 3 Warren Kean K	Linebackers: 39 Agustín Barrenechea; 34 Mike Botterill; 77 A. J. Gass; 42 Rob Hitchcock; 45 Kenneth Hollis; 29 Siddeeq Shabazz; Defensive backs: 20 Jason Flowers; 23 Shannon Garrett; 12 Jason Goss; 43 J. R. LaRose; 18 Will Loftus; 2 Omarr Morgan; 24 Chris Thompson; 9 Lenny Williams	Reserve roster: 27 Tyler Ebell RB; 50 Rhett McLane G; Injured list: 84 T. J. Acree WR; 91 Adam Braidwood DE; 25 Jonté Buhl DB; 67 Dan Comiskey G/T; 90 Antico Dalton LB; 41 Brandon Guillory DE; 96 Isaac Keys LB; 65 Kevin Lefsrud C/G; 24 Ron McClendon RB; 15 Ricky Ray QB; 10 Stanford Samuels DB; Suspended: -- Ronnie Heard DB; 31 Joey Thomas DB; Italics indicate International player

== Awards and records ==
None

=== All-Star selections ===
None
