= 2006 Edmonton Eskimos season =

Canadian football team season

- General manager: Paul Jones
- Head coach: Danny Maciocia
- Home stadium: Commonwealth Stadium

Results
- Record: 7–11
- Division place: 4th, West
- Playoffs: did not qualify
- Team MOP: Ricky Ray, QB
- Team MOC: Dan Comiskey, OL
- Team MOR: Adam Braidwood, DL

Uniform

The 2006 Edmonton Eskimos finished fourth in the West Division with a 7–11 record and failed to make the playoffs. This marked the end of their 34 year streak of making the playoffs, the longest such streak in North American sports history.

== Offseason ==
=== CFL draft ===
Round	Pick	Player	Position	School/Club team
1	1	Adam Braidwood	DE	Western Washington
2	17	Jason Nugent	DB	Rutgers
3	21	Dwayne Mundle	LB	West Virginia
3	25	Mike Williams	DE	Boise State
4	26	Andrew Brown	LB	Lafayette
4	34	Jean Phillipe Abraham	LB	Laval
5	42	Nicolas Bisaillon	RB	Laval
6	50	Greig Longchamps	OL	Montreal

=== Transactions ===
Date	Type	Incoming	Outgoing	Team
December 2, 2005	Trade	Danny McManus (QB); Tim Bakker (OL); *Imokhai Atogwe (DB); 1st round pick in 2006 CFL draft – Adam Braidwood (DL)	Jason Maas (QB); *6th round pick in 2006 CFL draft – Greig Longchamps (OL)	Hamilton Tiger-Cats
February 18, 2006	Trade	Robert Brown (DL); Reggie Durden (DB)	Davis Sanchez (DB)	Montreal Alouettes
March 8, 2006	Trade	4th round pick in 2006 CFL draft – Andrew Brown (LB)	Kwame Cavil (SB)	Hamilton Tiger-Cats
April 1, 2006	Trade	3rd round pick in 2006 CFL draft – Dwayne Mundle (LB)	Danny McManus	Calgary Stampeders
July 3, 2006	Trade	Michael Botterill (LB)	3rd round pick in 2007 CFL draft – Chris Van Zeyl (DL)	Montreal Alouettes

*Portion of the trade was reversed due to Atogwe's long-term injury

== Preseason ==
=== Schedule ===
#	Date	Visitor	Score	Home	OT	Attendance	Record	Pts
A	June 3	Edmonton Eskimos	8–14	Saskatchewan Roughriders		25,114	0–1	0
B	June 9	Saskatchewan Roughriders	22–7	Edmonton Eskimos		27,840	0–2	0

== Regular season ==
=== Season standings ===
West Division
Pos	Team	Pld	W	L	T	PF	PA	PD	Pts
1	BC Lions (Q)	18	13	5	0	555	355	+200	26
2	Calgary Stampeders (Q)	18	10	8	0	477	426	+51	20
3	Saskatchewan Roughriders (Q)	18	9	9	0	465	434	+31	18
4	Edmonton Eskimos	18	7	11	0	399	468	−69	14

Source: "2006 Regular Season Standings". Canadian Football League. Archived from the original on 2008-09-21.
(Q) Qualified for playoffs

=== Season schedule ===
#	Date	Visitor	Score	Home	OT	Attendance	Record	Pts
1	June 17	Edmonton Eskimos	14–24	Calgary Stampeders		25,895	0–1–0	0
2	June 24	Calgary Stampeders	14–18	Edmonton Eskimos		40,491	1–1–0	2
3	July 1	Edmonton Eskimos	10–46	Winnipeg Blue Bombers		23,521	1–2–0	2
4	July 7	BC Lions	20–27	Edmonton Eskimos		35,035	2–2–0	4
5	Bye						2–2–0	4
6	July 20	Winnipeg Blue Bombers	25–22	Edmonton Eskimos		37,611	2–3–0	4
7	July 28	Montreal Alouettes	21–13	Edmonton Eskimos		32,411	2–4–0	4
8	Aug 4	Edmonton Eskimos	17–34	BC Lions		27,312	2–5–0	4
9	Aug 11	Saskatchewan Roughriders	18–24	Edmonton Eskimos		39,599	3–5–0	6
10	Aug 18	Edmonton Eskimos	28–30	BC Lions		33,589	3–6–0	6
11	Bye						3–6–0	6
12	Sept 4	Edmonton Eskimos	23–44	Calgary Stampeders		35,744	3–7–0	6
13	Sept 8	Calgary Stampeders	26–45	Edmonton Eskimos		47,965	4–7–0	8
14	Sept 16	Edmonton Eskimos	22–27	Hamilton Tiger-Cats		25,107	4–8–0	8
15	Sept 22	Hamilton Tiger-Cats	20–18	Edmonton Eskimos		36,406	4–9–0	8
16	Sept 30	Edmonton Eskimos	30–25	Saskatchewan Roughriders		27,894	5–9–0	10
17	Oct 9	Edmonton Eskimos	23–28	Toronto Argonauts		26,891	5–10–0	10
18	Oct 14	Toronto Argonauts	28–25	Edmonton Eskimos		39,533	5–11–0	10
19	Oct 21	Edmonton Eskimos	30–20	Montreal Alouettes		45,607	6–11–0	12
20	Oct 27	Saskatchewan Roughriders	18–20	Edmonton Eskimos		31,779	7–11–0	14

Total attendance: 340,830
Average attendance: 37,870 (63.0%)

== Roster ==
2006 Edmonton Eskimos final roster
Quarterbacks: 16 Jason Johnson; 7 Steven Jyles; 15 Ricky Ray; Running backs: 30 Mathieu Bertrand; 19 Mike Maurer; 24 Ron McClendon; 35 Jarred Winkel; Receivers: 86 Richard Alston; 89 Deitan Dubuc TE; 81 Ed Hervey; 3 Robert LeBlanc; 88 Andrew Nowacki; 4 Jean-Francois Romeo; 14 Tony Tompkins; 83 Jason Tucker; 6 Pat Woodcock	Offensive linemen: 64 Tim Bakker C; 67 Dan Comiskey G/T; 56 Patrick Kabongo T; 63 Joe McGrath T; 50 Rhett McLane G; 58 Raleigh Roundtree G; Defensive linemen: 91 Adam Braidwood DE; 94 Robert Brown DE/DT; 98 Steve Charbonneau DT; 41 Brandon Guillory DE; 92 Jabari Issa DT; Special teams: 11 Sean Fleming K/P; 52 Taylor Inglis LS	Linebackers: 34 Mike Botterill; 90 Antico Dalton; 77 A. J. Gass; 45 Quincy Stewart; 40 Marcus Winn; Defensive backs: 26 Donny Brady; 25 Jonté Buhl; 10 Malcolm Frank; 23 Shannon Garrett; 43 J. R. LaRose; 18 Will Loftus; 27 Singor Mobley; Reserve roster: 61 Glenn Carson G; 28 Keyuo Craver DB; 32 Troy Davis RB; 85 Trevor Gaylor WR	Injured list: 95 Charles Alston DE; 22 Mike Bradley RB; 5 Reggie Durden DB; 13 Steven Marsh DB; 87 Derrell Mitchell SB; 20 Jason Nugent DB; 96 Andre Sommersell LB; 76 Randy Spencer DT; 37 Roosevelt Williams DB; 31 Kelly Wiltshire DB; 9 Toby Zeigler WR; Suspended: Milt Collins DB; Matt Miller T; Darrell Rideaux DB; Italics indicate International player
