= 2004 Edmonton Eskimos season =

Canadian football team season

- General manager: Tom Higgins
- Head coach: Tom Higgins
- Home stadium: Commonwealth Stadium

Results
- Record: 9–9
- Division place: 2nd, West
- Playoffs: Lost West Semi-Final
- Team MOP: Jason Maas, QB
- Team MOC: Sean Fleming, P/K
- Team MOR: Mathieu Bertrand, FB

Uniform

The 2004 Edmonton Eskimos finished second in the West Division with a 9–9 record winning the tie-breaker with the Saskatchewan Roughriders, who also finished 9–9–0, and denying them a home playoff date. The Roughriders defeated the Eskimos in the West Semi-Final, ending their season and a chance to defend their Grey Cup title.

== Offseason ==
=== CFL draft ===
Round	Pick	Player	Position	School/Club team
1	9	Amarpreet Sanghera	OL	British Columbia
2	10	Gilles Lezi	FB	Northwestern
2	17	Rhett McLane	OL	Saskatchewan
3	26	Andrew Nowacki	WR	Murray State
4	35	Chad Rempel	WR	Saskatchewan
5	44	Martin Gagnon	DB	Laval
6	53	David Thorne	OL	Mount Allison

== Preseason ==
=== Schedule ===
#	Date	Visitor	Score	Home	OT	Attendance	Record	Pts
A	May 30	Edmonton Eskimos	17–27	Saskatchewan Roughriders		22,645	0–1	0
B	Bye							
C	June 11	Calgary Stampeders	19–22	Edmonton Eskimos		30,082	1–1	2

== Regular season ==
=== Season standings ===
West Division
Pos	Team	Pld	W	L	T	PF	PA	PD	Pts
1	BC Lions (C, Q)	18	13	5	0	584	436	+148	26
2	Edmonton Eskimos (Q)	18	9	9	0	532	472	+60	18
3	Saskatchewan Roughriders (Q)	18	9	9	0	476	444	+32	18
4	Winnipeg Blue Bombers	18	7	11	0	448	507	−59	14
5	Calgary Stampeders	18	4	14	0	396	522	−126	8

Source: "2004 Regular Season Standings". Archived from the original on 2011-11-10.
(C) First round bye; (Q) Qualified for playoffs

=== Season schedule ===
Week	Date	Visitor	Score	Home	OT	Attendance	Record	Pts
1	June 19	Edmonton Eskimos	9–33	Montreal Alouettes		20,202	0–1–0	0
2	June 26	BC Lions	41–34	Edmonton Eskimos		35,367	0–2–0	0
3	July 2	Edmonton Eskimos	15–44	Ottawa Renegades		22,843	0–3–0	0
4	July 9	Edmonton Eskimos	25–9	BC Lions		22,227	1–3–0	2
5	July 17	Hamilton Tiger-Cats	30–51	Edmonton Eskimos		35,728	2–3–0	4
6	Bye						2–3–0	4
7	July 30	Winnipeg Blue Bombers	24–41	Edmonton Eskimos		38,363	3–3–0	6
8	Aug 8	Edmonton Eskimos	39–14	Toronto Argonauts		23,897	3–4–0	6
9	Aug 12	Edmonton Eskimos	14–25	Winnipeg Blue Bombers		23,998	3–5–0	6
10	Aug 20	Saskatchewan Roughriders	7–31	Edmonton Eskimos		42,399	4–5–0	8
11	Aug 29	Ottawa Renegades	16–57	Edmonton Eskimos		37,109	5–5–0	10
12	Sept 6	Edmonton Eskimos	25–7	Calgary Stampeders		35,651	6–5–0	12
13	Sept 10	Calgary Stampeders	44–12	Edmonton Eskimos		50,366	7–5–0	14
14	Sept 18	Edmonton Eskimos	33–36	BC Lions	OT	29,704	7–6–0	14
15	Sept 25	Toronto Argonauts	26–17	Edmonton Eskimos		41,113	7–7–0	14
16	Oct 1	Edmonton Eskimos	27–30	Hamilton Tiger-Cats		27,884	7–8–0	14
17	Oct 11	Montreal Alouettes	19–39	Edmonton Eskimos		37,708	8–8–0	16
18	Oct 17	Edmonton Eskimos	16–40	Saskatchewan Roughriders		30,087	8–9–0	16
19	Oct 24	Winnipeg Blue Bombers	34–40	Edmonton Eskimos		33,131	9–9–0	18
20	Bye						9–9–0	18

Total attendance: 351,284
Average attendance: 39,031 (65.0%)

== Playoffs ==
Week	Date	Visitor	Score	Home	OT	Attendance
Division Semi-Final	Nov 7	Saskatchewan Roughriders	14–6	Edmonton Eskimos		37,359

=== West Semi-Final ===
Team	Q1	Q2	Q3	Q4	Total
Saskatchewan Roughriders	0	7	0	7	14
Edmonton Eskimos	0	3	2	1	6

== Roster ==
2004 Edmonton Eskimos final roster
Quarterbacks: 17 Bart Hendricks; 18 Jason Johnson; 12 Jason Maas; Running backs: 30 Mathieu Bertrand; 22 Mike Bradley; 32 Gilles Lezi; 34 Mike Pringle; Receivers: 81 Ed Hervey; 87 Derrell Mitchell; 9 Winston October; 80 Brock Ralph; 86 Scott Robinson; 83 Jason Tucker; 3 Terry Vaughn	Offensive linemen: 61 Glenn Carson T; 67 Dan Comiskey G; 65 Kevin Lefsrud G/C; 50 Joe McGrath T; 60 Chris Morris T; 51 Carlo Panaro G; 68 Devin Rodger C; Defensive linemen: 90 Rahim Abdullah DE; 96 Jabari Issa DE; 97 Rashad Jeanty DE; 95 Albert Reese DT; 76 Randy Spencer DT; 93 Clinton Wayne DT	Linebackers: 99 Sheldon Benoit; 77 A. J. Gass; 31 Roger Reinson; 44 Sean Spender; 55 Glen Young; Defensive backs: 26 Donny Brady; 4 Darrel Crutchfield; 10 Malcolm Frank; 23 Shannon Garrett; 8 Robert Grant; 13 Steven Marsh; 27 Singor Mobley; Special teams: 11 Sean Fleming K/P	Injured list: 5 Imokhai Atogwe DB; 91 Dorian Boose DE; 98 Steve Charbonneau DT; 82 Scott Cloman WR; 25 Quincy Coleman DB; 85 Trevor Gaylor WR; 45 Olanzo Jarrett LB; 56 Patrick Kabongo G; 97 Kelvin Kinney DE; -- Rhett McLane G; 33 Troy Mills RB; 37 Harold Nash DB; 88 Andrew Nowacki WR; 53 Tim Prinsen C; 57 Amar Sanghera T; 20 Reggie White RB; 54 Antonio Wilson LB; Italics indicate American player
