= 2007 CIS football season =

- Duration: August 31, 2007 – October 27, 2007
- Hardy Cup champions: Manitoba Bisons
- Yates Cup champions: Western Ontario Mustangs
- Dunsmore Cup champions: Laval Rouge et Or
- Loney Bowl champions: Saint Mary's Huskies
- Mitchell Bowl champions: Manitoba Bisons
- Uteck Bowl champions: Saint Mary's Huskies

Vanier Cup
- Date: November 23, 2007
- Venue: Rogers Centre, Toronto
- Champions: Manitoba Bisons

CIS football seasons seasons
- 2006 2008

The 2007 CIS football season began on August 31, 2007, and concluded with the 43rd Vanier Cup national championship on November 23 at the Rogers Centre in Toronto, Ontario, with the Manitoba Bisons winning their third championship. Twenty-seven universities across Canada competed in CIS football this season, the highest level of amateur play in Canadian football, under the auspices of Canadian Interuniversity Sport (CIS).

== Schedule ==
2007 marked the first year that the Vanier Cup and Grey Cup were played on the same weekend where they both took place in Toronto's Rogers Centre as part of the 95th Grey Cup celebrations. Dating back to 1973, previous Vanier Cups had always been played the week following the Grey Cup.

== Awards and records ==
=== Awards ===
- Hec Crighton Trophy – Erik Glavic, Saint Mary's
- Presidents' Trophy – Mat Nesbitt, Regina
- Russ Jackson Award – Clovis Langlois-Boucher, Sherbrooke
- J. P. Metras Trophy – Scott Evans, Wilfrid Laurier
- Peter Gorman Trophy – Liam Mahoney, Concordia

== All-Canadian team ==
=== First Team ===
Offence
Erik Glavic, QB, Saint Mary's
Jamall Lee, RB, Bishop's
Michael Giffin, RB, Queen's
Mike Bradwell, SB, McMaster
Laurent Lavigne-Masse, SB, Laval
Samuel Giguere, WR, Sherbrooke
Charles-Antoine Sinotte, WR, McGill
Tim O'Neill, C, Calgary
Luc Brodeur-Jourdain, G, Laval
Adam Rogers, G, Acadia
Scott Evans, T, Wilfrid Laurier
Jean-François Morin-Roberge, T, Montreal

Defence
Martin Gagné, DE, Montreal
Justin Cooper, DE, Manitoba
Chris Van Zeyl, DT, McMaster
Simon Patrick, DT, Manitoba
Mat Nesbitt, LB, Regina
Eric Maranda, LB, Laval
Dan Bass, LB, Alberta
Paul Woldu, CB, Saskatchewan
Jean Petit-Frere, CB, Laval
Sammy Okpro, HB, Concordia
David Timmons, HB, Ottawa
Dylan Barker, FS, Saskatchewan

Special Teams
Ara Tchobanian, K, Ottawa
Derek Schiavone, P, Western
Gary Ross, RET, Mount Allison

=== Second Team ===
Offence
Joshua Sacobie, QB, Ottawa
Anthony Woodson, RB, Calgary
Pierre-Luc Yao, RB, Laval
Erik Galas, SB, McGill
Rob Bagg, SB, Queen's
Aaron Holba, WR, Alberta
Rob Serviss, WR, McMaster
Kevin Kelly, C, Ottawa
Brendon LaBatte, G, Regina
Frank Spera, G, Ottawa
Simeon Rottier, T, Alberta
Cody Kennedy, T, Queen's

Defence
Daniel Kennedy, DE, Ottawa
Osinachi Ukwuoma, DE, Queen's
Daniel Schutte, DT, Saint Mary's
Sebastien Treault, DT, Ottawa
Mike Sheridan, LB, Ottawa
Tim St. Pierre, LB, Saint Mary's
Anthony Maggiacomo, LB, Wilfrid Laurier
Jeff Zelinski, CB, Saint Mary's
Taurean Allen, CB, Wilfrid Laurier
Brady Browne, HB, Manitoba
Jean-Philip Provencher, HB, Montreal
Elliott Richardson, FS, Acadia

Special Teams
Hugh O'Neill, K, Alberta
Hugh O'Neill, P, Alberta
Duane John, RET, Laval

== Results ==
=== Regular season standings ===
Note: GP = Games Played, W = Wins, L = Losses, PF = Points For, PA = Points Against, Pts = Points

Canada West
Team	GP	W	L	PF	PA	Pts
**Manitoba**	8	8	0	206	110	16
**Regina**	8	6	2	257	195	12
**Saskatchewan**	8	5	3	213	131	10
**Calgary**	8	4	4	233	180	8
UBC	8	3	5	167	198	6
Alberta	8	2	6	166	204	4
Simon Fraser	8	0	8	70	294	0

Ontario
Team	GP	W	L	PF	PA	Pts
**Ottawa**	8	8	0	310	108	16
**Laurier**	8	7	1	279	112	14
**Queen's**	8	6	2	229	117	12
**McMaster**	8	5	3	230	221	10
**Guelph**	8	4	4	248	173	8
**Western**	8	4	4	223	127	8
Waterloo	8	3	5	123	255	6
Windsor	8	2	6	156	262	4
York	8	1	7	90	279	2
Toronto	8	0	8	111	345	0

Quebec
Team	GP	W	L	PF	PA	Pts
**Laval**	8	8	0	312	120	16
**Concordia**	8	5	3	182	172	10
**Bishop's**	8	5	3	218	176	10
**Montreal**	8	4	4	151	149	8
Sherbrooke	8	4	4	233	189	8
McGill	8	0	8	144	289	0

Atlantic
Team	GP	W	L	PF	PA	Pts
**Saint Mary's**	8	7	1	352	171	14
**StFX**	8	3	5	157	284	6
**Acadia**	8	3	5	182	286	6
Mount Allison	8	1	7	199	294	2

Teams in bold earned playoff berths.

=== Top 10 ===
CIS Top 10 Rankings
	01	02	03	04	05	06	07	08	09	10
Acadia Axemen	12	14	12	NR	14	NR	NR	NR	NR	NR
Alberta Golden Bears	NR	NR	NR	NR	NR	NR	NR	NR	NR	NR
Bishop's Gaiters	NR	NR	NR	11	9	8	7	6	9	9
Calgary Dinos	15	12	11	NR	NR	NR	NR	NR	NR	12
Concordia Stingers	6	6	7	6	8	7	10	10	10	8
Guelph Gryphons	NR	15	NR	14	12	11	11	11	NR	11
Laurier Golden Hawks	8	7	6	5	4	4	4	5	5	5
Laval Rouge et Or	1	1	1	1	1	1	1	1	1	1
Manitoba Bisons	4	4	4	4	3	3	3	3	3	3
McGill Redmen	NR	NR	NR	NR	NR	NR	NR	NR	NR	NR
McMaster Marauders	9	10	9	13	13	NR	13	12	11	NR
Montreal Carabins	5	5	5	8	NR	NR	NR	NR	NR	14
Mount Allison Mounties	NR	NR	NR	NR	NR	NR	NR	NR	NR	NR
Ottawa Gee-Gees	3	3	3	3	2	2	2	2	2	2
Queen's Golden Gaels	NR	13	10	8	7	9	9	9	8	13
Regina Rams	11	NR	NR	14	10	10	8	7	7	6
Saint Mary's Huskies	10	8	8	7	6	6	6	4	4	4
Saskatchewan Huskies	2	2	2	2	5	5	5	8	6	7
Sherbrooke Vert et Or	16	NR	NR	NR	NR	NR	14	NR	NR	NR
St. Francis Xavier X-Men	NR	NR	NR	NR	NR	NR	NR	NR	NR	NR
Simon Fraser Clan	NR	NR	NR	NR	NR	NR	NR	NR	NR	NR
Toronto Varsity Blues	NR	NR	NR	NR	NR	NR	NR	NR	NR	NR
UBC Thunderbirds	13	NR	NR	12	NR	NR	12	NR	NR	NR
Waterloo Warriors	NR	NR	NR	10	11	NR	NR	NR	NR	NR
Western Mustangs	7	11	NR	NR	NR	NR	NR	NR	NR	10
Windsor Lancers	14	9	NR	NR	NR	NR	NR	NR	NR	NR
York Lions	NR	NR	NR	NR	NR	NR	NR	NR	NR	NR

Ranks in italics are teams not ranked in the top 10 poll but received votes. NR = Not ranked, received no votes.

=== Championships ===
The Vanier Cup is played between the champions of the Mitchell Bowl and the Uteck Bowl, the national semi-final games. In 2007, according to the rotating schedule, the winners of the Canada West conference Hardy Trophy meet the Ontario conference's Yates Cup champion for the Mitchell Bowl. The winners of the Dunsmore Cup Quebec championship travel to the Atlantic conference Loney Bowl championship team for the Uteck Bowl.

=== Vanier Cup ===
==== Playoff bracket ====
Conference Quarter-finals
**Guelph Gryphons**	**25**
McMaster Marauders	21
**Western Ontario Mustangs**	**27**
Queen's Golden Gaels	19

Conference Semi-finals
Montreal Carabins	16
**Laval Rouge et Or**	**28**
Bishop's Gaiters	18
**Concordia Stingers**	**34**
Acadia Axemen	17
**St. Francis Xavier X-Men**	**38**
Calgary Dinos	5
**Manitoba Bisons**	**27**
Saskatchewan Huskies	13
**Regina Rams**	**19**
**Guelph Gryphons**	**38**
Laurier Golden Hawks	31
**Western Ontario Mustangs**	**23**
Ottawa Gee-Gees	16

Conference Championships
Concordia Stingers	10
**Laval Rouge et Or**	**35**
St. Francis Xavier X-Men	24
**Saint Mary's Huskies**	**25**
Regina Rams	5
**Manitoba Bisons**	**48**
**Western Ontario Mustangs**	**34**
Guelph Gryphons	21

National Semi-finals
Laval Rouge et Or	2
**Saint Mary's Huskies**	**24**
Western Ontario Mustangs	20
**Manitoba Bisons**	**52**

43rd Vanier Cup
Saint Mary's Huskies	14
**Manitoba Bisons**	**28**
