= List of Edmonton Elks seasons =

This is a complete list of seasons competed by the Edmonton Elks (formerly the Edmonton Eskimos), a Canadian Football League team. While the team was founded in 1949, they did not join the CFL until it was founded in 1958. Throughout their history, Edmonton has won 15 Grey Cups.

Grey Cup Championships †	West Division Championships *	Regular season Championships ^

League season	Club season	League	Division	Finish	Wins	Losses	Ties	Playoffs
1949	1949	WIFU	–	3rd	4	10	0	
1950	1950	WIFU	–	3rd	7	7	0	Won W.I.F.U. Semi-Final (Roughriders) 21–1; Lost W.I.F.U. Finals (Blue Bombers) 1–2 series
1951	1951	WIFU	–	2nd	8	6	0	Won W.I.F.U. Semi-Final (Blue Bombers) 4–1; Lost W.I.F.U. Finals (Roughriders) 1–2 series
1952	1952	WIFU*	–	2nd	9	6	1	Won W.I.F.U. Semi-Finals (Stampeders) 1–1 series (42–38 points); Won W.I.F.U. Finals (Blue Bombers) 2–1 series Lost Grey Cup (Argonauts) 21–11
1953	1953	WIFU	–	1st^	12	4	0	Lost West Finals (Blue Bombers) 1–2 series
1954	1954	WIFU†*	–	1st^	11	5	0	Won West Finals (Blue Bombers) 2–1 series Won Grey Cup (Alouettes) 25–24
1955	1955	WIFU†*	–	1st^	14	2	0	Won West Finals (Blue Bombers) 2–0 series Won Grey Cup (Alouettes) 34–19
1956	1956	WIFU†*	–	1st^	11	5	0	Won West Finals (Roughriders) 2–1 series Won Grey Cup (Alouettes) 50–27
1957	1957	WIFU	–	1st^	14	2	0	Lost W.I.F.U. Finals (Blue Bombers) 1–2 series
1958	1958	CFL	W.I.F.U.	2nd	9	6	1	Won W.I.F.U. Semi-Finals (Roughriders) 2–0 series Lost W.I.F.U. Finals (Blue Bombers) 1–2 series
1959	1959	CFL	W.I.F.U.	2nd	10	6	0	Won West Semi-Finals (Lions) 2–0 series Lost W.I.F.U. Finals (Blue Bombers) 0–2 series
1960	1960	CFL	W.I.F.U.*	2nd	10	6	0	Won West Semi-Finals (Stampeders) 2–0 series Won West Finals (Blue Bombers) 2–1 series Lost Grey Cup (Rough Riders) 16–6
1961	1961	CFL	West	2nd	10	5	1	Lost West Semi-Finals (Stampeders) 1–1 series (27–26 points)
1962	1962	CFL	West	5th	6	9	1	
1963	1963	CFL	West	5th	2	14	0	
1964	1964	CFL	West	4th	4	12	0	
1965	1965	CFL	West	5th	5	11	0	
1966	1966	CFL	West	3rd	6	9	1	Lost West Semi-Final (Blue Bombers) 16–8
1967	1967	CFL	West	3rd	9	6	1	Lost West Semi-Final (Roughriders) 21–5
1968	1968	CFL	West	3rd	8	7	1	Lost West Semi-Final (Stampeders) 29–13
1969	1969	CFL	West	4th	5	11	0	
1970	1970	CFL	West	2nd	9	7	0	Lost West Semi-Finals (Stampeders) 16–9
1971	1971	CFL	West	5th	6	10	0	
1972	1972	CFL	West	2nd	10	6	0	Lost West Semi-Finals (Roughriders) 8–6
1973	1973	CFL	West*	1st^	9	5	2	Won West Final (Roughriders) 25–23; Lost Grey Cup (Rough Riders) 22–18
1974	1974	CFL	West*	1st^	10	5	1	Won West Final (Roughriders) 31–27; Lost Grey Cup (Alouettes) 20–7
1975	1975	CFL†	West*	1st^	12	4	0	Won West Final (Roughriders) 30–18; Won Grey Cup (Alouettes) 9–8
1976	1976	CFL	West	3rd	9	6	1	Won West Semi-Final (Blue Bombers) 14–12; Lost West Final (Roughriders) 23–13
1977	1977	CFL	West*	1st^	10	6	0	Won West Final (Lions) 38–1; Lost Grey Cup (Alouettes) 41–6
1978	1978	CFL†	West*	1st^	10	4	2	Won West Final (Stampeders) 26–13; Won Grey Cup (Alouettes) 20–13
1979	1979	CFL†	West*	1st^	12	2	2	Won West Final (Stampeders) 19–17; Won Grey Cup (Alouettes) 17–9
1980	1980	CFL†	West*	1st^	13	3	0	Won West Final (Blue Bombers 34–24; Won Grey Cup (Tiger-Cats) 48–10
1981	1981	CFL†	West*	1st^	14	1	1	Won West Final (Lions) 22–16; Won Grey Cup (Rough Riders) 26–23
1982	1982	CFL†	West*	1st^	11	5	0	Won West Final (Blue Bombers) 24–21; Won Grey Cup (Argonauts) 32–16
1983	1983	CFL	West	3rd	8	8	0	Lost West Semi-Final (Blue Bombers) 49–22
1984	1984	CFL	West	3rd	9	7	0	Lost West Semi-Final (Blue Bombers) 55–20
1985	1985	CFL	West	3rd	10	6	0	Lost West Semi-Final (Blue Bombers) 22–15
1986	1986	CFL	West*	1st^	13	4	1	Won West Semi-Final (Stampeders) 27–18; Won West Final (Lions) 41–5; Lost Grey Cup (Tiger-Cats) 39–15
1987	1987	CFL†	West*	2nd	11	7	0	Won West Semi-Final (Stampeders) 30–16; Won West Final (Lions) 31–7; Won Grey Cup (Argonauts) 38–36
1988	1988	CFL	West	1st^	11	7	0	Lost West Final (Lions) 37–19
1989	1989	CFL	West	1st^	16	2	0	Lost West Final (Roughriders) 32–21
1990	1990	CFL	West*	2nd	10	8	0	Won West Semi-Final (Roughriders) 43–27; Won West Final (Stampeders) 43–23; Lost Grey Cup (Blue Bombers) 50–11
1991	1991	CFL	West	1st^	12	6	0	Lost West Final (Stampeders) 38–36
1992	1992	CFL	West	2nd	10	8	0	Won West Semi-Final (Roughriders) 22–20; Lost West Final (Stampeders) 23–22
1993	1993	CFL†	West*	2nd	12	6	0	Won West Semi-Final (Roughriders) 51–13; Won West Final (Stampeders) 29–15; Won Grey Cup (Blue Bombers) 33–23
1994	1994	CFL	West	2nd	13	5	0	Lost West Semi-Final (Lions) 24–23
1995	1995	CFL	North	2nd	13	5	0	Won North Semi-Final (Lions) 26–15; Lost North Final (Stampeders) 37–4
1996	1996	CFL	West*	2nd	11	7	0	Won West Semi-Final (Blue Bombers) 68–7; Won West Final (Stampeders) 15–12; Lost Grey Cup (Argonauts) 43–37
1997	1997	CFL	West	1st^	12	6	0	Lost West Final (Roughriders) 31–30
1998	1998	CFL	West	2nd	9	9	0	Won West Semi-Final (Lions) 40–33; Lost West Final (Stampeders) 33–10
1999	1999	CFL	West	3rd	6	12	0	Lost West Semi-Final (Stampeders) 30–17
2000	2000	CFL	West	2nd	10	8	0	Lost West Semi-Final (Lions) 34–32
2001	2001	CFL	West	1st^	9	9	0	Lost West Final (Stampeders) 34–16
2002	2002	CFL	West*	1st^	13	5	0	Won West Final (Blue Bombers) 33–30; Lost Grey Cup (Alouettes) 25–16
2003	2003	CFL†	West*	1st^	13	5	0	Won West Final (Roughriders) 30–23; Won Grey Cup (Alouettes) 34–22
2004	2004	CFL	West	2nd	9	9	0	Lost West Semi-Final (Roughriders) 14–6
2005	2005	CFL†	West*	3rd	11	7	0	Won West Semi-Final (Stampeders) 33–26; Won West Final (Lions) 28–23; Won Grey Cup (Alouettes) 38–35
2006	2006	CFL	West	4th	7	11	0	
2007	2007	CFL	West	4th	5	12	1	
2008	2008	CFL	West	4th	10	8	0	Won East Semi-Final (Blue Bombers) 29–21; Lost East Final (Alouettes) 36–26
2009	2009	CFL	West	3rd	9	9	0	Lost West Semi-Final (Stampeders) 24–21
2010	2010	CFL	West	4th	7	11	0	
2011	2011	CFL	West	2nd	11	7	0	Won West Semi-Final (Stampeders) 33–19; Lost West Final (Lions) 40–23
2012	2012	CFL	West	4th	7	11	0	Lost East Semi-Final (Argonauts) 42–26
2013	2013	CFL	West	4th	4	14	0	
2014	2014	CFL	West	2nd	12	6	0	Won West Semi-Final (Roughriders) 18–10; Lost West Final (Stampeders) 43–18
2015	2015	CFL†	West*	1st^	14	4	0	Won West Final (Stampeders) 45–31; Won Grey Cup (Redblacks) 26–20
2016	2016	CFL	West	4th	10	8	0	Won East Semi-Final (Tiger-Cats) 24–21; Lost East Final (Redblacks) 35–23
2017	2017	CFL	West	3rd	12	6	0	Won West Semi-Final (Blue Bombers) 39–32; Lost West Final (Stampeders) 32–28
2018	2018	CFL	West	5th	9	9	0	
2019	2019	CFL	West	4th	8	10	0	Won East Semi-Final (Alouettes) 37–29; Lost East Final (Tiger-Cats) 36–16
2020	2020	CFL	West	Season cancelled due to the COVID-19 pandemic				
2021	2021	CFL	West	5th	3	11	0	
2022	2022	CFL	West	5th	4	14	0	
2023	2023	CFL	West	5th	4	14	0	
2024	2024	CFL	West	4th	7	11	0	
2025	2025	CFL	West	5th	7	11	0	
2026	2026	CFL†	West*	1st^	13	5	0	Won West Final (Lions) 28–16; Won Grey Cup (Alouettes) 37–30
Regular Season Totals (1949–2026)					723	561	18	
Playoff Totals (1949–2026)					59	47		
Grey Cup Totals (1949–2026)					15	9		
