= AJ Harris =

AJ Harris may refer to:

- Andrew Harris (cricketer, born 1973), English cricketer, commonly known as A. J. Harris
- A. J. Harris (running back) (born 1984), Canadian football running back
- A. J. Harris (cornerback), American football defensive back
