= Dante Luciani =

Canadian football player (born 1985)

No. 3
- Position: Wide receiver

Personal information
- Born: September 1, 1985 (age 41); Oakville, Ontario, Canada
- Listed height: 6 ft 0 in (1.83 m)
- Listed weight: 180 lb (82 kg)

Career information
- University: Wilfrid Laurier Golden Hawks
- CFL draft: 2005: 5th round, 34th overall pick

Career history
- 2008–2009: Edmonton Eskimos*
- 2009: Montreal Alouettes*
- 2009: Winnipeg Blue Bombers
- * Offseason or practice squad member only

Awards and highlights
- 2005 Vanier Cup champion
- Stats at CFL.ca

Dante Luciani
Medal record

Men's American football

Representing Canada

World Championship
Silver medal – second place	2011 Austria	Team competition

Dante Luciani (born September 1, 1985) is a Canadian former professional football wide receiver. He was drafted by the Edmonton Eskimos in the fifth round of the 2008 CFL draft. He played CIS football for the Wilfrid Laurier Golden Hawks.

Luciani's 17-yard catch near the end of the 2005 Vanier Cup on a third down and fifteen-yard gamble set up a come-from-behind 24 to 23 victory for the Golden Hawks.

He was signed to the Eskimos practice roster for the 2008 Edmonton Eskimos season and returned for the 2009 pre-season but was released on cut-down day before the regular season.

On September 18, 2009, he was signed to the Montreal Alouettes practice roster. He was released on September 22 and signed by the Winnipeg Blue Bombers on September 23 to their practice roster.
