= Jonte =

Jonte may refer to:

- Jonte (river), a tributary of the Tarn in Southern France

People

- Jonté Buhl (born 1982), a professional Canadian football cornerback free agent
- Jonte Willis (born 1983), an American heavyweight boxer
- Antonio Álvarez Jonte (1784–1820), an Argentine politician
