= Ciezki =

Ciezki is a surname. Notable people with the surname include:

- Chris Ciezki (born 1982), Canadian football player
- Jurgen Ciezki (1952–2001), German weightlifter
- Shay Ciezki (born 2003), American basketball player
