= Tim St. Pierre =

Canadian football player (born 1986)

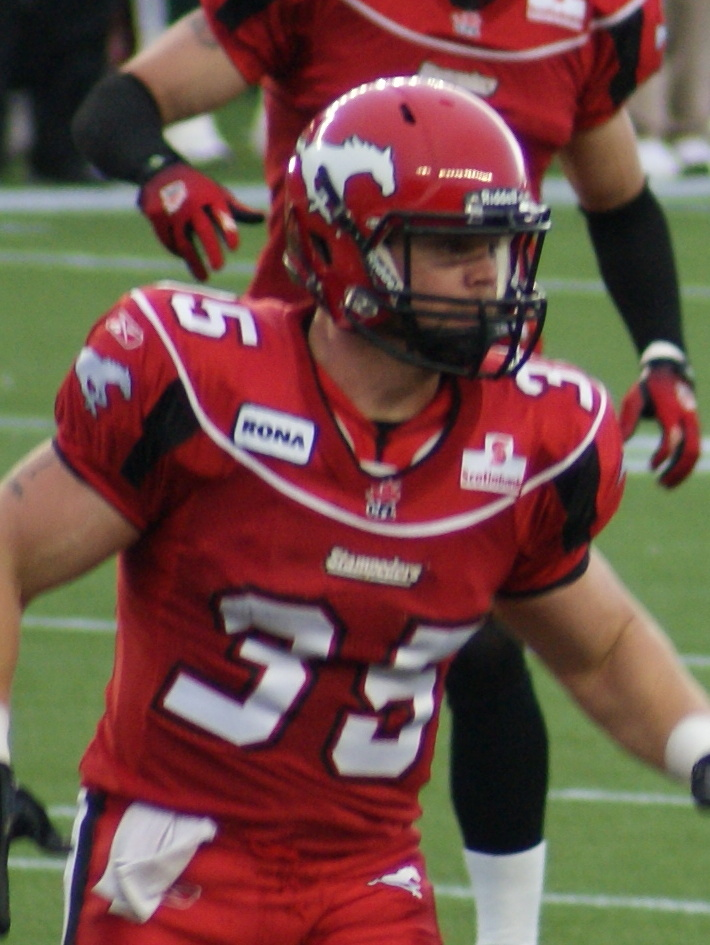
- St. Pierre with the Calgary Stampeders in 2011

No. 35
- Positions: Fullback, Long snapper

Personal information
- Born: April 18, 1986 (age 40); Hamilton, Ontario, Canada
- Listed height: 6 ft 1 in (1.85 m)
- Listed weight: 235 lb (107 kg)

Career information
- High school: Westdale
- University: Saint Mary's
- CFL draft: 2008: 3rd round, 19th overall pick

Career history
- 2008–2010: Edmonton Eskimos
- 2011–2016: Calgary Stampeders

Awards and highlights
- Grey Cup champion (2014); Eskimos' Most Outstanding Special Teams Player (2010)
- Stats at CFL.ca

Tim St. Pierre (born April 18, 1986) is a Canadian former professional football fullback and long snapper. He was drafted by the Edmonton Eskimos in the third round of the 2008 CFL draft. He played CIS football for the Saint Mary's Huskies.

== Professional career ==
=== Edmonton Eskimos ===
Eskimos 2008 Season

Tim St.Pierre was drafted as a Linebacker / Long snapper by the Edmonton Eskimos via (Calgary Stampeders) of the Canadian Football League in the third round (19th overall) of the 2008 CFL Canadian Draft. "He's blue collar," said Eskimos head coach Danny Maciocia "All business. He's a kid we think is going to be an impact special-teams player."

During his rookie season Tim wore jersey #48 and made his CFL debut on June 28 at Mosaic Stadium against the Saskatchewan Roughriders and saw his first action as a long snapper on October 4 against the Winnipeg Blue Bombers. St.Pierre played in all 18 regular season games, the Eastern Division semi-final at Canad Inns Stadium versus the Winnipeg Blue Bombers and the Eastern Division Finals against the Montreal Alouettes in Olympic Stadium. Tim recorded his first career special teams tackle on July 10 at Commonwealth Stadium against the Toronto Argonauts with a total of 3 tackles on the season.

Eskimos 2009 Season

St.Pierre started the year wearing #48, changing his jersey to #55 in week 5, played in all 18 regular season games and the Western Division semi-final at McMahon Stadium against the Calgary Stampeders. Tim recorded his first defensive tackle on August 8 at Ivor Wynne Stadium against the Hamilton Tiger-Cats, had a career high of 3 defensive tackles versus the Saskatchewan Roughriders on August 20 and recovered his first career fumble on October 30 at Commonwealth Stadium against the Toronto Argonauts. St.Pierre finished the year with 11 defensive tackles, 17 special teams tackles, a recovered fumble and 2 special teams tackles in the western semi-final.

Eskimos 2010 Season

"Tim St.Pierre played valuable snaps for us last year at linebacker and is going to be our long-snapper." announced Eskimos head coach Richie Hall saying the decision to make Tim the starting long snapper "was to get versatility in all our personnel." St.Pierre changed his jersey to #53 in the off season, played in 17 regular season games and finished the year with 1 defensive tackle, 13 special teams tackles, a recovered fumble and was named the Eskimos Most Outstanding Special Teams Player Nominee for 2010.

=== Calgary Stampeders ===
Stampeders 2011 Season

Tim St.Pierre became an eligible CFL Free Agent on February 16, 2011, after failing to come to terms on a new agreement with Eric Tillman, general manager and vice-president of football operations for the Edmonton Eskimos. The General manager and Head coach, John Hufnagel of the Calgary Stampeders announced on the same day that they had signed Tim to the club and believed, “He will provide excellent depth for our football team". On June 14, 2016, St. Pierre was released by the Stampeders.
