= John Comiskey (Canadian football) =

Canadian football player (born 1980)

Profile
- Position: Centre

Personal information
- Born: November 17, 1980 (age 45); Prince Albert, Saskatchewan, Canada
- Listed height: 6 ft 4 in (1.93 m)
- Listed weight: 299 lb (136 kg)

Career information
- University: Windsor
- CFL draft: 2005: 3rd round, 19th overall pick

Career history
- 2005–2007: Calgary Stampeders
- 2008–2009: Edmonton Eskimos
- 2010: Calgary Stampeders

Awards and highlights
- Eskimos' Outstanding Offensive Lineman (2008)
- Stats at CFL.ca

John Comiskey (born November 17, 1980) is a Canadian former professional football centre in the Canadian Football League.

== Early life ==
Comiskey played for the Windsor AKO Fratmen of the Canadian Junior Football League, where he was an all-star and part of the 1999 National Junior Champions. He played at Rutgers University in 2000 as a freshman. Following the footsteps of his older brother Dan Comiskey, John then played for the Windsor Lancers in 2002 and 2003 and acted as the team captain in 2002.

== Professional career ==
The Calgary Stampeders chose Comiskey 19th overall in the third round of the 2005 CFL draft and he played seven games of the 2005 CFL season and all 18 games of the 2006 CFL season for the Stampeders. Comiskey played 13 regular season games of the 2007 CFL season for Calgary and the West Semi-Final game, missing five games due to a shoulder nerve injury.

Comiskey was traded to the Edmonton Eskimos along with Kevin Challenger and the 11th and 19th overall picks in the 2008 CFL draft in exchange for the Eskimos' second and tenth overall picks in the 2008 draft. The trade allowed him to play alongside his older brother Dan Comiskey on the offensive line. He started all 18 games for the Eskimos at centre and was Edmonton's nominee for the CFL's Most Outstanding Offensive Lineman Award. He re-signed with the Eskimos on December 4, 2008, for two years plus an optional year.

Comiskey re-signed with the Stampeders in 2010 but retired May 13, 2010, due to a knee injury.
