= Jim Davis (gridiron football) =

American gridiron football player (born 1981)

No. 99
- Position: Defensive end

Personal information
- Born: October 4, 1981 (age 45); Highland Springs, Virginia, U.S.
- Listed height: 6 ft 4 in (1.93 m)
- Listed weight: 276 lb (125 kg)

Career information
- College: Virginia Tech

Career history
- 2005-2006: Jacksonville Jaguars
- 2008: Edmonton Eskimos
- 2009: Calgary Stampeders

Awards and highlights
- Second-team All-ACC (2004)
- Stats at Pro Football Reference
- Stats at CFL.ca (archive)

James Edward Davis Jr. (born October 4, 1981) is a former professional Canadian football defensive end.

== Early life ==
Davis played four seasons of college football as a defensive end for the Virginia Tech Hokies recording 131 tackles, 19 sacks, one fumble recovery, and one interception in 48 games.

== Professional career ==
Davis first signed as an undrafted free agent with the Jacksonville Jaguars of the National Football League in 2005 and appeared in one game before being released in February 2007.

The Edmonton Eskimos signed Davis as a free agent on May 8, 2008, and started and played 14 games in the 2008 CFL season. For his first 11 games, he started at defensive tackle and then switched to defensive end in October. He recording 26 defensive tackles, three knockdowns, six sacks, three tackles for losses (10 yards), and a forced fumble in his first CFL season. He was a final cut on June 25, 2009.

Davis signed with the Calgary Stampeders on August 21, 2009, and was assigned to their practice roster.
