= Keith Williams (cornerback) =

American gridiron football player (born 1983)

Profile
- Position: Cornerback

Personal information
- Born: December 12, 1983 (age 42); Mount Vernon, New York, U.S.
- Listed height: 5 ft 9 in (1.75 m)
- Listed weight: 190 lb (86 kg)

Career information
- College: Florida A&M
- NFL draft: 2007: undrafted

Career history
- 2007: Montreal Alouettes*
- 2008: Edmonton Eskimos
- 2008: Montreal Alouettes
- * Offseason or practice squad member only
- Stats at CFL.ca

Keith Williams (born December 12, 1983) is an American former professional football cornerback. He was signed as an undrafted free agent by the Montreal Alouettes in 2007. He played college football for the Florida A&M Rattlers.

Williams also played for the Edmonton Eskimos and Montreal Alouettes.
