= Ryan Glasper =

American gridiron football player (born 1985)

Profile
- Position: Safety

Personal information
- Born: June 15, 1985 (age 41); New Britain, Connecticut, U.S.
- Listed height: 5 ft 11 in (1.80 m)
- Listed weight: 215 lb (98 kg)

Career information
- High school: Southington High School
- College: Boston College
- NFL draft: 2007: undrafted

Career history
- Hamilton Tiger-Cats (2007–2008); Toronto Argonauts (2008)*; Edmonton Eskimos (2008)*; Hartford Colonials (2010)
- * Offseason or practice squad member only
- Stats at CFL.ca (archive)

Ryan E. Glasper (born June 15, 1985) is a former professional Canadian football and American football safety. He was signed as a street free agent by the Hamilton Tiger-Cats in 2007. He played college football for the Boston College Eagles.

Glasper was also a member of the Toronto Argonauts, Edmonton Eskimos and Hartford Colonials.

== Early life ==
Ryan Glasper was born in New Britain, Connecticut. At the age of 14, his mother signed legal custody of him over to his then high school football coach, Jude Kelly.

Ryan attended Southington High School in Southington, Connecticut. He started on the varsity squad his sophomore year and played a pivotal role on the offense as a receiver and running back. Catching passes from quarterback Dan Bruetsch, he became a dangerous offensive weapon and showed his potential. Glasper helped the Blue Knights win the CCC South crown. As a junior, he progressed to have a greater role in the offense, as he started at wide receiver, at running back, and on special teams. Glasper helped lead his team to another CCC South title. In the beginning of his senior campaign he was asked to play quarterback with the graduation of strong-armed quarterback Doug Fink (who was later drafted by the Boston Red Sox in the 29th round of the 2003 draft). Glasper eagerly took on the role and was progressing well until an ankle injury sidelined him. It was during this time that Glasper signed his letter of intent with Boston College to play safety on their defense. After signing his letter of intent, Glasper moved over to the defensive backfield full-time. While mentoring young sophomore quarterback Aaron Canterbury, Glasper helped lead the Blue Knights to a share of the CCC South title.

Glasper was voted part of the tri-captain squad during his senior year with Dan Bird and John Vose.

During his high school career, Glasper also returned punts and kickoffs. He set school records for longest punt return (92 yards), longest kickoff return (98 yards) and longest play from scrimmage (97 yards). He earned SuperPrep All-American honors as a senior defensive back and was voted to the All-State Class LL team, as well as 2001 New Haven Register All-State, for his outstanding play.

Glasper also played varsity basketball and was on the track team in high school.

== College career ==
Glasper was not redshirted his freshman year at Boston College, eventually making a total of 29 starts and appearing in 45 total collegiate contests. He ended his college career with 177 career tackles, including 100 unassisted stops. He finished with six interceptions, eight pass breakups, 5.5 tackles for loss and 1.0 sack in his career. Glasper won 2 awards for the Boston College Eagles. He was awarded the Paul Cavanagh Award, for the player whose collective on and off the field accomplishments speak volumes about his commitment to balance, a level-headed and realistic outlook on life, and his wholesome perspective on volunteerism, ethics and the community; a football player whose accomplishments on the field distinguish him as an achiever and as a contributor in many ways. He was also awarded the Jay McGillis Scholarship Award, given in recognition of a defensive back who best exemplifies the personal qualities of team dedication and leadership by example, an extraordinary competitive spirit, and personal concern for family, friends and teammates.

In January 2006, during 7-on-7 drills with teammates, Glasper took a false step and tore his labrum and cartilage in his left hip, requiring surgery three months later. He was not granted a medical red-shirt by the BC coaching and medical staff, forcing him to miss the first 5 games of the season or not play at all and have his college career be over. He eventually returned but was never at 100% during the season but he still was a force on the defense. By the time BC's bowl game came around on December 30, Glasper was back down to his playing weight of 212 pounds (96 kg) and notched his best game of the season. With help from his agent, Glasper got a late invitation to the Hula Bowl in January. Despite getting to Hawaii on Tuesday night, when most of the team had been there since Saturday, Glasper was tabbed as a starter after just one meeting and one practice.

== Professional career ==
=== NFL ===
Glasper worked out at the Boston College Pro Day on March 21, 2007. He had a relatively good showing running his 40-yard dash in 4.59 seconds. He ran a 20-yard dash in 2.66 seconds and a 10-yard dash in 1.56 seconds. Ryan also ran the 20 yard shuttle run in 4.15 seconds and maneuvered the 3-cone drill in 6.86 seconds. Ryan bench pressed a standard 225 pounds (102 kg) 14 times, had a vertical leap of 34.5 inches (88 cm), and had a leap of 9 feet 5 inches (2.87 m) in the broad jump.

Glasper went undrafted but attended the New York Giants rookie camp as a try-out, but was not signed to a contract.

=== CFL ===
In 2007, Glasper was signed by the Hamilton Tiger-Cats. The Ti-Cats converted Glasper from a strong safety to an outside linebacker. The move proved to be successful, as he served as a starter for the Hamilton defense. Glasper made his CFL debut on July 7 of that year. He completed the season playing in eight games, recording 27 defensive tackles, 10 special teams tackles, one forced fumble, 2 tackles for losses, and two pass knockdowns.

In 2008, Glasper dressed in the first 10 games of the Tiger-Cats' season, recording 30 defensive tackles and five special teams tackles. He was eventually released by the Tiger-Cats on September 30, 2008. On October 15, Glasper was signed by the Toronto Argonauts to a practice roster agreement.

He was signed by the Edmonton Eskimos on May 4, 2009. He was released on June 25, 2009.

=== UFL ===
Glasper was signed by the Hartford Colonials on June 15, 2010. He was released on November 6.
