= Kenny Onatolu =

American football player (born 1982)

No. 55, 56
- Position: Linebacker

Personal information
- Born: October 8, 1982 (age 44); Chicago, Illinois, U.S.
- Listed height: 6 ft 1 in (1.85 m)
- Listed weight: 235 lb (107 kg)

Career information
- High school: Papillion-La Vista (Papillion, Nebraska)
- College: Nebraska–Omaha
- NFL draft: 2007: undrafted

Career history
- Edmonton Eskimos (2007−2008); Minnesota Vikings (2009−2011); Carolina Panthers (2012)

Career NFL statistics
- Total tackles: 49
- Stats at Pro Football Reference
- Stats at CFL.ca (archive)

Olayiwola Kehinde "Kenny" Onatolu (born October 8, 1982) is an American former professional football player who played linebacker in the National Football League (NFL) and Canadian Football League (CFL). He was signed by the Edmonton Eskimos as an undrafted free agent in 2007. He played college football for the Nebraska–Omaha Mavericks.

Onatolu also played for the Minnesota Vikings and Carolina Panthers.

== Early life ==
Onatolu was born in Chicago, but spent 3 years as a child in his parents' home country of Nigeria.

== College career ==
At the University of Nebraska Omaha, Onatolu earned Division II All-America honors as a junior and senior by Collegesportsreport.com, and recorded 324 career total tackles in his collegiate career, fifth in school history. He was named All-North Central Conference after each of his 4 seasons (2nd team his sophomore year), and captured team's Outstanding LB award in 2005 and Defensive MVP award in 2006. Onatolu was also a member of the Super 6 comedy team.

== Professional career ==
=== Edmonton Eskimos ===
After going undrafted in 2007, Onatolu attended an Edmonton Eskimos minicamp after his twin brother Taiwo had a similar experience. He was invited to training camp and eventually made the team.

During his rookie season in the CFL, Onatolu recorded eight tackles and a sack. The following season in 2008, he recorded 59 tackles, three sacks and two fumble recoveries.

=== Minnesota Vikings ===
Onatolu was signed to a future contract by the Minnesota Vikings on December 31, 2008. He made the team as a backup linebacker and was one of the leaders on special teams for the Vikings.

=== Carolina Panthers ===
Onatolu was signed to a three-year contract by the Carolina Panthers on March 16, 2012. After playing in just four games in the 2012 season, Onatolu was released by the Panthers on April 16, 2013.

== Personal life ==
Onatolu earned a bachelor's degree in communications at the University of Nebraska-Omaha, and aspires to have a career in broadcasting. He has an identical twin brother named Taiwo, who was his teammate at Nebraska-Omaha.
