= Scott Evans (Canadian football) =

Canadian football player (born 1983)

No. 58
- Position: Offensive tackle

Personal information
- Born: December 15, 1983 (age 42); Sudbury, Ontario, Canada
- Listed height: 6 ft 6 in (1.98 m)
- Listed weight: 305 lb (138 kg)

Career information
- College: Wilfrid Laurier University
- NFL draft: 2008: undrafted

Career history
- Toronto Argonauts (2008–2009)

Awards and highlights
- J. P. Metras Trophy (2007)
- Stats at CFL.ca (archive)

Scott Evans (born December 15, 1983) is a Canadian former professional football offensive tackle. He also played CIS Football at Wilfrid Laurier. Evans first signed with the Toronto Argonauts as an undrafted free agent in 2007 and attended training camp, but returned to school after its conclusion. He re-signed with the Argonauts in 2008, and remained on their practice roster for the first seven weeks of the 2008 CFL season, then returned to Wilfrid Laurier for his final year of eligibility on August 16, 2008. Evans re-joined the Argonauts for the start of the 2009 pre-season training camp, but was cut by the team, only to rejoin the Argonauts on October 16, 2009 under a practice roster agreement. On June 11, 2010, Evans was released by the Argonauts.
