= Lamar Herron =

American football player (born 1984)

No. 39
- Position: Defensive back

Personal information
- Born: October 27, 1984 (age 42); Alameda, California, U.S.
- Listed height: 6 ft 0 in (1.83 m)
- Listed weight: 207 lb (94 kg)

Career information
- High school: Natomas (Sacramento, California)
- College: Texas Southern
- NFL draft: 2008: undrafted

Career history
- 2009: Edmonton Eskimos
- Stats at CFL.ca (archive)

Lamar Tremane Herron (born October 27, 1984) is a former professional Canadian football defensive back for the Edmonton Eskimos of the Canadian Football League. He was signed by the Eskimos as a street free agent in 2009. He played college football at Oregon State and Texas Southern.

Born in Alameda, Herron graduated from Natomas High School in Sacramento, California. He attended Oregon State University and played for the Oregon State Beavers from 2004 to 2005 before transferring to Texas Southern University.

As a senior at Texas Southern in 2007, Herron led the team in total tackles (68).
