= Steven Jyles =

American gridiron football player (born 1982)

No. 7, 3, 9
- Position: Quarterback

Personal information
- Born: September 25, 1982 (age 44); Independence, Louisiana, U.S.
- Listed height: 6 ft 1 in (1.85 m)
- Listed weight: 211 lb (96 kg)

Career information
- College: UL Monroe (2002–2005)
- NFL draft: 2006: undrafted

Career history
- 2006–2007: Edmonton Eskimos
- 2008–2009: Saskatchewan Roughriders
- 2010: Winnipeg Blue Bombers
- 2011: Toronto Argonauts
- 2012: Edmonton Eskimos
- 2014: BC Lions*
- * Offseason or practice squad member only

Awards and highlights
- Sun Belt Player of the Year (2005); Sun Belt Offensive Player of the Year (2005); First-team All-Sun Belt (2005)

Career CFL statistics
- Passing attempts: 908
- Passing completions: 541
- Completion percentage: 59.6%
- TD–INT: 37–35
- Passing yards: 7,075
- Passer rating: 81.7
- Stats at CFL.ca (archive)

Steven Jyles (born September 25, 1982) is an American former football quarterback who played in the Canadian Football League (CFL). He played college football for the UL Monroe Indians and was signed as an undrafted free agent by the Edmonton Eskimos in 2006. Jyles was also a member of the Saskatchewan Roughriders, the Winnipeg Blue Bombers, the Toronto Argonauts, and the BC Lions.

== Professional football ==
=== Edmonton Eskimos (first stint) ===
Steven Jyles signed with the Edmonton Eskimos prior to the 2006 CFL season on March 23, 2006. He dressed in all 18 games and scored his first CFL touchdown on October 21, 2006 against the Montreal Alouettes in Olympic Stadium. He again dressed for all 18 games as the third-string quarterback in 2007, seeing limited playing time behind Ricky Ray and Stefan LeFors.

=== Saskatchewan Roughriders ===
On February 8, 2008, Jyles was traded, along with Edmonton's 2008 2nd round CFL draft choice, to the Saskatchewan Roughriders for Fred Perry and Saskatchewan's 2008 2nd round draft choice. He made his first career start against his former team, the Eskimos, on October 25, 2008 in a 55–9 win (although Jyles would be pulled at halftime). He completed his first professional touchdown pass against the BC Lions in week 2 to Andy Fantuz in a 26–16 win.

In 2009, he competed against Darian Durant for the open quarterback position, following Michael Bishop's off-season release. Durant would win this battle and he would not relinquish the role as he started all 18 games that season. Subsequently, Jyles saw little playing time.

=== Winnipeg Blue Bombers ===
Jyles signed as a free agent with the Winnipeg Blue Bombers on February 23, 2010, joining his former Saskatchewan offensive co-ordinator, Paul LaPolice, who had been hired as the Blue Bombers' head coach. It was initially thought that Jyles would have an excellent chance to be the starting quarterback for the team after they had released incumbent Michael Bishop, but two months later, the team announced that they had signed Buck Pierce, meaning Jyles would be relegated to backup duty.

Pierce started the 2010 season as the starter, but was injured in game 3, meaning that Jyles would get the next start, again against Edmonton. After winning his first game as a Bomber against Edmonton, he would lose his next two before Pierce returned from injury to start game 7 against the Hamilton Tiger-Cats. However, Pierce was again injured in that game, so Jyles started the next game against Montreal. Pierce came back for the Labour Day Classic against the Saskatchewan Roughriders, but, for his third consecutive start, was injured in the game. Jyles was declared the starter for the remainder of the season, but he himself was injured in week 17 against the Toronto Argonauts, effectively ending his season and the Bombers' playoff hopes that year.

=== Toronto Argonauts ===
On March 30, 2011 Jyles was traded to the Toronto Argonauts in exchange for a 1st round selection (4th overall) in the 2011 CFL draft and a conditional draft choice in 2012. Jyles spent the first nine games of the 2011 season on the nine-game injured list after he continued to recover from the injury he sustained during the previous season. After incumbent starting quarterback Cleo Lemon was released on September 6, 2011, Jyles was named the starter for the team's game against the BC Lions on September 10, 2011. Jyles would go on to start the following eight games of the season, having sat out the last regular season game due to injury.

=== Edmonton Eskimos (second stint) ===
Jyles was again traded in the offseason, this time to the Eskimos on December 12, 2011, along with Grant Shaw and a 2012 first round draft pick, for Ricky Ray. On June 24, Jyles was declared the starting quarterback for 2012. Jyles started the first eight games of the season for the Eskimos before he was demoted to 2nd and 3rd string for the remainder of the season. Ray went on to win the 100th Grey Cup with the Toronto Argonauts and Jyles was released by the Eskimos on January 21, 2013.

=== BC Lions ===
On April 7, 2014, Jyles was signed by the BC Lions to compete for a back-up role to entrenched starter, Travis Lulay. He retired from the CFL before the start of training camp.

== CFL statistics ==
		Passing									Rushing
Year	Team	Games	Started	Att	Comp	Pct	Yards	TD	Int	Rating	Att	Yards	Avg	Long	TD	Fumb
2006	EDM	18	0	11	6	54.5	48	0	0	65.7	3	7	2.3	4	1	0
2007	EDM	18	0	40	19	47.5	214	0	3	32.7	20	80	4.0	23	3	0
2008	SSK	18	1	61	42	68.9	533	4	6	76.7	14	114	8.1	22	0	1
2009	SSK	18	0	40	25	62.5	290	1	2	71.9	24	102	4.3	21	4	1
2010	WPG	16	11	318	196	61.6	2,804	19	7	100.9	65	452	7.0	32	4	8
2011	TOR	8	8	218	124	56.9	1,430	7	11	66.5	53	429	8.1	24	1	5
2012	EDM	9	9	220	109	58.6	1,756	6	6	81.9	18	112	6.2	15	0	3
CFL totals		105	29	908	541	59.6	7,075	37	35	81.7	197	1,296	6.6	32	13	18
