= Greg Whelan =

Canadian football player (born 1983)

No. 54
- Position: Linebacker

Personal information
- Born: December 21, 1983 (age 42); Edmonton, Alberta, Canada
- Listed height: 6 ft 1 in (1.85 m)
- Listed weight: 210 lb (95 kg)

Career information
- High school: Holy Trinity
- University: Alberta

Career history
- 2009–2010: Edmonton Eskimos
- Stats at CFL.ca

Gregory Whelan (born December 21, 1983) is a Canadian former professional football linebacker for the Edmonton Eskimos of the Canadian Football League. He was signed by the Eskimos as an undrafted free agent in 2009. He played CIS football for the Alberta Golden Bears.
