= Shaun Richardson =

American gridiron football player (born 1985)

No. 42
- Position: Linebacker

Personal information
- Born: May 21, 1985 (age 41); St. Louis, Missouri, U.S.
- Listed height: 6 ft 3 in (1.91 m)
- Listed weight: 250 lb (113 kg)

Career information
- High school: Cleveland ROTC
- College: Tennessee State University
- NFL draft: 2008: undrafted

Career history
- 2008: San Francisco 49ers*
- 2009: Edmonton Eskimos
- 2012: Kansas City Command
- * Offseason or practice squad member only

Shaun Richardson (born May 21, 1985) is an American former professional football linebacker. He was signed by the San Francisco 49ers as an undrafted free agent in 2008. He played college football for the Tennessee State Tigers. He played three games for the Edmonton Eskimos in 2009. Richardson also played for the Kansas City Command of the Arena Football League.
