= Danny Maciocia =

Canadian Football League general manager

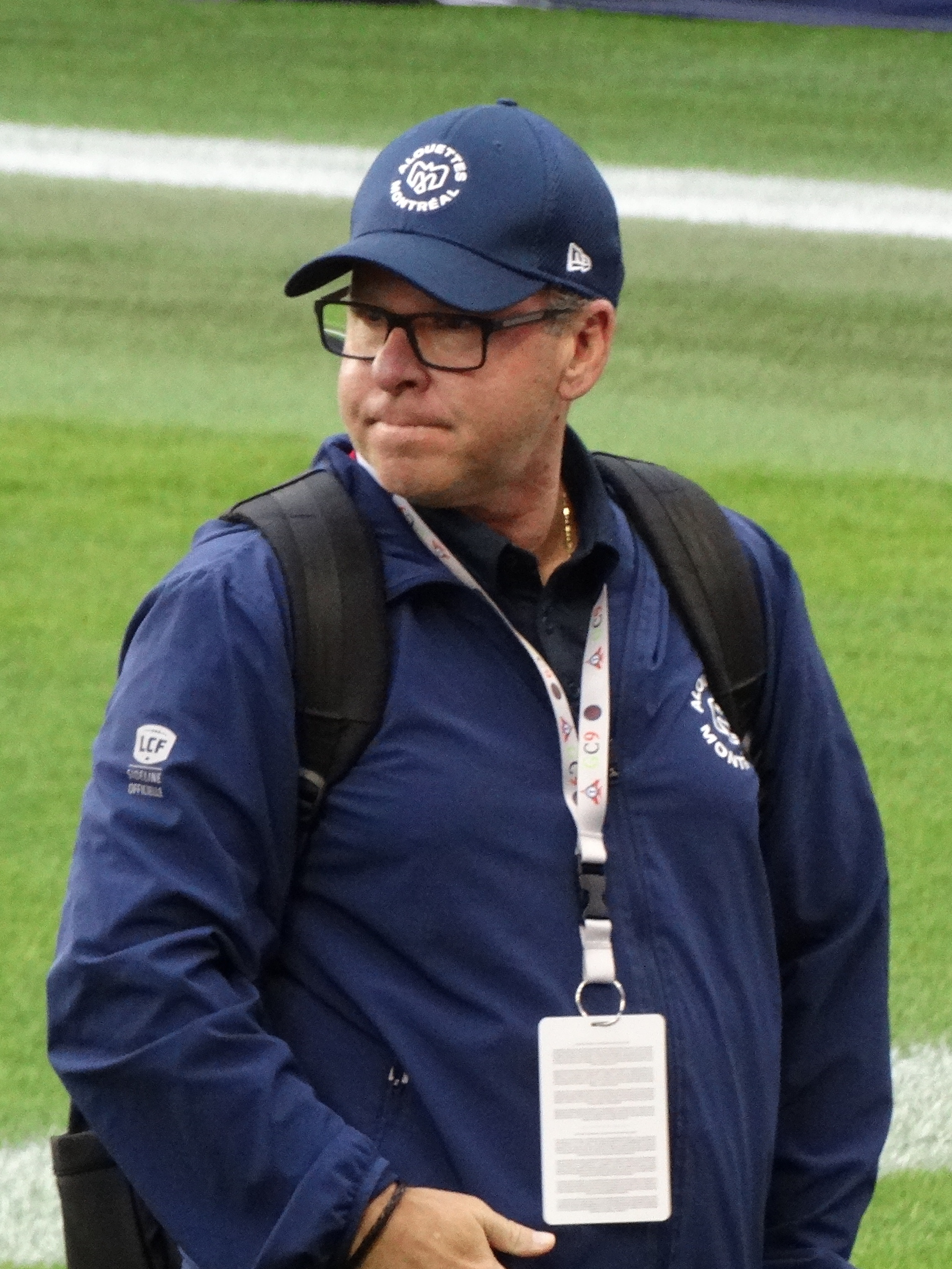
- Maciocia with the Montreal Alouettes in 2024

Montreal Alouettes
- Title: General manager

Personal information
- Born: May 26, 1967 (age 59); Montreal, Quebec, Canada

Career information
- High school: Laurier Macdonald

Career history

Coaching
- 1994: St. Leonard Cougars (OC)
- 1995: St. Leonard Cougars (HC)
- 1996: Montreal Alouettes (Quality control coach)
- 1997–1999: Montreal Alouettes (RB coach)
- 2000: Montreal Alouettes (Assistant OC)
- 2001: Montreal Alouettes (OC)
- 2002–2004: Edmonton Eskimos (OC)
- 2005–2008: Edmonton Eskimos (HC)
- 2010: André-Grasset Phénix (OC)
- 2011–2019: Université de Montréal (HC)
- 2022: Montreal Alouettes (HC)

Operations
- 2007: Edmonton Eskimos (Director of football operations)
- 2008–2010: Edmonton Eskimos (GM & Director of football operations)
- 2020–present: Montreal Alouettes (GM)

Awards and highlights
- 3× Grey Cup champion (2003, 2005, 2023); Vanier Cup champion (2014)

Danny Maciocia (born May 26, 1967) is a Canadian professional football coach who is the current general manager of the Montreal Alouettes of the Canadian Football League (CFL). He was previously head coach of the Université de Montréal Carabins football team. He is also the former general manager and director of football operations of the CFL's Edmonton Eskimos and former offensive coordinator with the André-Grasset Phénix, a CEGEP team in Montreal.

== Early life ==
Maciocia grew up in the Saint-Leonard neighbourhood of suburban Montreal. He attended Laurier Macdonald High School, where he played football and graduated in 1984, and then worked in the family insurance business.

== Coaching and managerial career ==
=== Early years ===
Maciocia began his professional coaching career in 1993 when he took a job as an assistant coach with the Canadian junior national football team. In 1995, he moved into the ranks of the CJFL as offensive coordinator of the St. Leonard Cougars, who won the championship of the league in Maciocia's first year.

=== Montreal Alouettes ===
In 1998, Maciocia entered the CFL as the running backs coach of the Montreal Alouettes. In 2001, he became offensive coordinator in Montreal, then took the same position in Edmonton the following season. Maciocia was also the head coach of the 2004 edition of the Canadian junior football team for the eighth NFL Global Junior Championship.

=== Edmonton Eskimos ===
Maciocia was announced as the offensive coordinator for the Edmonton Eskimos on February 19, 2002. He served in that role for three years where the Eskimos appeared in two Grey Cup games, including his first championship win in the 91st Grey Cup game. He was appointed as head coach of the Eskimos after the firing of former coach Tom Higgins following 2004 CFL season. Maciocia became the first Quebec-born head coach in CFL history and the first Canadian head coach of the Eskimos since Annis Stukus in 1951. In 2005, Maciocia guided the Eskimos to a championship victory in the 93rd Grey Cup, the thirteenth in franchise history. He was also the first Canadian-born head coach in Eskimos history to win the Grey Cup with the team.

The 2006 season was not successful for Maciocia and the Eskimos. The team missed the play-offs for the first time in 34 years, ending a record streak for consecutive post-season appearances among North American professional sports teams. Rumours abounded of Maciocia being on the hotseat after the 2006 campaign, but during the off-season he was surprisingly given a promotion. In addition to coach, Maciocia became director of football operations. As a result, he had a high degree control over decisions on player personnel. Despite Maciocia taking more control, the Eskimos finished with an even worse record in 2007 and once again missed the play-offs. He resigned as head coach while continuing on as head of football operations following the end of the 2008 CFL season, where the Eskimos managed to make the playoffs with a 10–8 record, defeated the Winnipeg Blue Bombers in the East Semi-Final, and lost the East Final against the Montreal Alouettes. On July 31, 2010, Maciocia was fired by the Eskimos after the first win in a 1–4 start to the 2010 season.

=== Montreal Carabins ===
Maciocia served as a volunteer coach for Collège André-Grasset for the 2010 season helping them to a Quebec junior college (CEGEP) championship. He was later named head coach of the Montreal Carabins football team of the Université de Montréal on November 17, 2010. In the 2014, as the Carabins won the 50th Vanier Cup. On their way there, they defeated the Laval Rouge et Or to win their first Dunsmore Cup, the Manitoba Bisons in the Uteck Bowl and then the McMaster Marauders in the Vanier Cup final. In the 2015, the Carabins once again returned to the national title game with Maciocia at the helm, only to be defeated this time by the UBC T-Birds, 16–13.

=== Montreal Alouettes ===
Maciocia was briefly considered a candidate for the Montreal Alouettes vacant general manager position in December 2016, following the mutual termination of Jim Popp's contract. The job instead went to Kavis Reed. In early January 2020 he was once-again rumoured to be a top-candidate to replace Kavis Reed after the team was sold to Sid Spiegel and Gary Stern. After much speculation, Maciocia was named general manager of the Montreal Alouettes on January 13, 2020. In his first season as general manager, in 2021, the team finished in third place in the East Division with a 7–7 record and lost the East Semi-Final.

After the first four games of the 2022 season, the team's head coach Khari Jones was fired and replaced by Maciocia. Maciocia finished the year with an 8–6 record and a second-place finished as the Alouettes lost the East Final to the Toronto Argonauts. In the off-season, he hired Jason Maas to become the team's head coach. Maas led the team to an 11–7 record and a victory in the 110th Grey Cup, bringing Maciocia his first Grey Cup championship as a general manager. He then signed a four-year contraction extension on December 20, 2023, that would keep him with the Alouettes through to the 2027 season.

== CFL GM record ==
| Team | Year | Regular season | | | | | Postseason | | |
| Team | Year | Won | Lost | Ties | Win % | Finish | Won | Lost | Result |
|---|---|---|---|---|---|---|---|---|---|
| EDM | 2007 | 5 | 12 | 1 | .294 | 4th in West Division | - | - | Failed to Qualify |
| EDM | 2008 | 10 | 8 | 0 | .556 | 4th in West Division | 1 | 1 | Lost in East Final |
| EDM | 2009 | 9 | 9 | 0 | .500 | 3rd in West Division | 0 | 1 | Lost in West Semi-Final |
| EDM | 2010 | 1 | 4 | 0 | .200 | 4th in West Division | - | - | (Fired Mid-Season) |
| MTL | 2021 | 7 | 7 | 0 | .500 | 3rd in East Division | 0 | 1 | Lost in East Semi-Final |
| MTL | 2022 | 9 | 9 | 0 | .500 | 2nd in East Division | 1 | 1 | Lost in East Final |
| MTL | 2023 | 11 | 7 | 0 | .588 | 2nd in East Division | 3 | 0 | Won Grey Cup |
| MTL | 2024 | 12 | 5 | 1 | .694 | 1st in East Division | 0 | 1 | Lost in East Final |
| MTL | 2025 | 10 | 8 | 0 | .556 | 2nd in East Division | 2 | 1 | Lost in Grey Cup |
| MTL | 2026 | 14 | 4 | 0 | .778 | 1st in East Division | 1 | 1 | Lost in Grey Cup |
| Total | | 87 | 73 | 2 | .543 | 2 Division Championships | 8 | 7 | 1 Grey Cup |

== CFL coaching record ==
| Team | Year | Regular season | | | | | Postseason | | |
| Team | Year | Won | Lost | Ties | Win % | Finish | Won | Lost | Result |
|---|---|---|---|---|---|---|---|---|---|
| EDM | 2005 | 11 | 7 | 0 | .611 | 3rd in West Division | 3 | 0 | Won Grey Cup |
| EDM | 2006 | 7 | 11 | 0 | .389 | 4th in West Division | - | - | Failed to Qualify |
| EDM | 2007 | 5 | 12 | 1 | .306 | 4th in West Division | - | - | Failed to Qualify |
| EDM | 2008 | 10 | 8 | 0 | .556 | 4th in West Division | 1 | 1 | Lost East Final |
| MTL | 2022 | 8 | 6 | 0 | .571 | 2nd in East Division | 1 | 1 | Lost East Final |
| Total | | 41 | 44 | 1 | .476 | 0 Division Championships | 5 | 2 | 1 Grey Cup |

== Personal life ==
Maciocia and his wife Sandra Vaz have three daughters. Maciocia is fluent in English, French, and Italian.

| Preceded by Pinball Clemons | Grey Cup–winning head coach 93rd Grey Cup, 2005 | Succeeded by Wally Buono |
