= Dee Sterling =

Canadian football player (born 1986)

No. 96
- Position: Defensive lineman

Personal information
- Born: February 3, 1986 (age 40); Kingston, Ontario, Canada
- Listed height: 6 ft 3 in (1.91 m)
- Listed weight: 261 lb (118 kg)

Career information
- High school: Frontenac
- University: Queen's
- CFL draft: 2009: 2nd round, 12th overall pick

Career history
- 2009–2011: Edmonton Eskimos
- Stats at CFL.ca

Dee Sterling (born February 3, 1986) is a Canadian former professional football defensive lineman who played for the Edmonton Eskimos of the Canadian Football League (CFL). He was selected by the Eskimos in the second round of the 2009 CFL draft. He played CIS football for the Queen's Golden Gaels.

He was released by the Eskimos on May 23, 2012.
