= Adam Rogers (Canadian football) =

Canadian football player (born 1985)

Profile
- Position: Offensive lineman

Personal information
- Born: December 9, 1985 (age 40); Woodville, Ontario, Canada
- Listed height: 6 ft 5 in (1.96 m)
- Listed weight: 310 lb (141 kg)

Career information
- University: Acadia
- CFL draft: 2008: undrafted

Career history
- 2008–2010: Edmonton Eskimos
- 2011: Hamilton Tiger-Cats
- Stats at CFL.ca

Adam Rogers (born December 9, 1985) is a Canadian former professional football offensive lineman. He was signed by the Edmonton Eskimos as an undrafted free agent in 2008. He played CIS football for the Acadia Axemen.
