= Calvin Armstrong =

American football player (born 1982)

No. 76, 59
- Position: Offensive lineman

Personal information
- Born: March 31, 1982 (age 44); Centralia, Washington, U.S.
- Listed height: 6 ft 7 in (2.01 m)
- Listed weight: 320 lb (145 kg)

Career information
- High school: Centralia
- College: Washington State
- NFL draft: 2005: 6th round, 211th overall pick

Career history
- 2005: Philadelphia Eagles
- 2006: Green Bay Packers*
- 2006–2007: Washington Redskins*
- 2008: Arizona Rattlers*
- 2008–2010: Edmonton Eskimos
- 2010: Toronto Argonauts
- * Offseason or practice squad member only

Awards and highlights
- CFL West All-Star (2009); 2× First-team All-Pac-10 (2002, 2004)

Calvin Armstrong (born March 31, 1982) is an American former professional football player who was an offensive lineman in the Canadian Football League (CFL). He played college football for the Washington State Cougars and was selected by the Philadelphia Eagles of the National Football League (NFL) in the sixth round of the 2005 NFL draft. He was also a member of the Green Bay Packers, Washington Redskins, Arizona Rattlers, Edmonton Eskimos and Toronto Argonauts.

== College career ==
At Washington State University, Armstrong was a two-time All-Pac-10 player and an integral member of 2002 WSU Rose Bowl team and 2003 Holiday Bowl team.
