= Agustín Barrenechea =

Canadian football player (born 1979)

No. 39
- Positions: Linebacker, Fullback

Personal information
- Born: May 20, 1979 (age 47); Mar del Plata, Argentina
- Listed height: 6 ft 2 in (1.88 m)
- Listed weight: 235 lb (107 kg)

Career information
- University: Calgary
- CFL draft: 2003: 4th round, 30th overall pick

Career history
- 2004–2007: Hamilton Tiger-Cats
- 2007–2008: Edmonton Eskimos
- 2009–2011: Hamilton Tiger-Cats

Career CFL statistics
- Quarterback sacks: 7
- Interceptions: 5
- Fumble recoveries: 3
- Stats at CFL.ca (archive)

Agustín "Auggie" Barrenechea (born May 20, 1979) is an Argentine-born retired Canadian football linebacker who played for eight years with the Hamilton Tiger-Cats and Edmonton Eskimos of the Canadian Football League (CFL). In 120 regular season games, Barrenechea racked up 240 defensive tackles, 55 special teams tackles, seven quarterback sacks and five interceptions. He secured the starting Middle Linebacker role his rookie year and proceeded to lead the Hamilton Defense in tackles in 2005 recording the franchise's 3rd highest single season defensive tackles. During his time in Edmonton he once again secured the starting Middle Linebacker position leading the Edmonton Eskimos in defensive tackles.

He was selected in the first round with the 10th pick by the Tiger-Cats in the 2003 CFL draft. Barrenechea announced his retirement on March 7, 2012. He played CIS Football with the University of Calgary.

Other accomplishments include in 2010 the Hamilton Tiger-Cats nominee for the Jake Gaudaur Veterans' Award which recognizes a CFL player who best demonstrates leadership attributes of Canada's Veterans; 2005 the Hamilton Tiger-Cats Most Outstanding Canadian; University of Calgary Dino Football Team Hec Crighton Trophy-Most Outstanding Player and President's Award-Top Defensive Player.
