= Michael Botterill =

Canadian football player (born 1980)

Profile
- Position: Linebacker

Personal information
- Born: November 9, 1980 (age 45); Belleville, Ontario
- Listed height: 6 ft 3 in (1.91 m)
- Listed weight: 225 lb (102 kg)

Career information
- University: McMaster
- CFL draft: 2003: 6th round, 51st overall pick

Career history
- 2003–2005: Montreal Alouettes
- 2006–2007: Edmonton Eskimos
- 2008: Hamilton Tiger-Cats
- Stats at CFL.ca (archive)

Michael James Botterill (born November 9, 1980) is a Canadian former professional football linebacker. He was selected in the sixth round with the 51st pick by the Montreal Alouettes in the 2003 CFL draft.

He played CIS football for the McMaster Marauders. Botterill also played for the Edmonton Eskimos and Hamilton Tiger-Cats.
