= Garrick Jones =

American gridiron football player (born 1978)

No. 66
- Position: Offensive tackle

Personal information
- Born: December 2, 1978 (age 47); Little Rock, Arkansas, U.S.
- Listed height: 6 ft 5 in (1.96 m)
- Listed weight: 312 lb (142 kg)

Career information
- College: Arkansas State

Career history
- 2002*: Jacksonville Jaguars
- 2002: Winnipeg Blue Bombers
- 2003*: Kansas City Chiefs
- 2003–2005: Houston Texans
- 2006*: Atlanta Falcons
- 2006: Winnipeg Blue Bombers
- 2007: Calgary Stampeders
- 2008–2009: Edmonton Eskimos
- Stats at CFL.ca

Garrick Jones (born December 2, 1978) is a former professional Canadian football offensive tackle. He was signed by the Jacksonville Jaguars as an undrafted free agent in 2002. He played college football for the Arkansas State Red Wolves

Jones has been a member of the Winnipeg Blue Bombers, Kansas City Chiefs, Houston Texans, Atlanta Falcons, Calgary Stampeders and Edmonton Eskimos.

Jones is now Commissioner & CEO of the States Developmental Football League who is a veteran of three professional football leagues. Garrick is also President of the Huddle Up Foundation of Houston and played five seasons in the National Football League and five seasons in the Canadian Football League, which was highlighted by signing his first NFL contract after forgoing his senior season at Arkansas States University due to personal issues. Garrick currently sits on the Board of Directors for the NFLPA Houston Chapter and the Advisory Board for IMPACT Sports LLC, which is a company focused on the development of concussion reducing helmets for all athletes.
