= A. J. Harris (running back) =

American gridiron football player (born 1984)

No. 32
- Position: Running back

Personal information
- Born: August 8, 1984 (age 42); Wheaton, Illinois, U.S.
- Listed height: 6 ft 1 in (1.85 m)
- Listed weight: 230 lb (104 kg)

Career information
- High school: Wheaton North
- College: Northern Illinois

Career history
- 2006: Washington Redskins*
- 2007: Cologne Centurions
- 2007: Seattle Seahawks*
- 2008: Edmonton Eskimos
- 2009: BC Lions
- 2010: Arkansas Diamonds
- * Offseason or practice squad member only

A. J. Harris (born August 8, 1984) is an American former gridiron football running back.

Harris played 44 games over four years at Northern Illinois University, rushing 342 times for 1,616 yards and 12 touchdowns. He also caught 31 passes for 197 yards. He signed as an undrafted free-agent with the Washington Redskins in 2006 and was released during pre-season, spent the spring of 2007 in NFL Europe playing for the Cologne Centurions, and attended training camp with the Seattle Seahawks in 2007. A. J. graduated from Wheaton North High School.

Harris signed as a free agent with the Edmonton Eskimos on February 7, 2008.

On August 3, 2009, Harris signed with the BC Lions.

On October 10, 2010, Harris signed with the Hamilton Tiger-Cats.
