= Dario Romero =

American gridiron football player (born 1978)

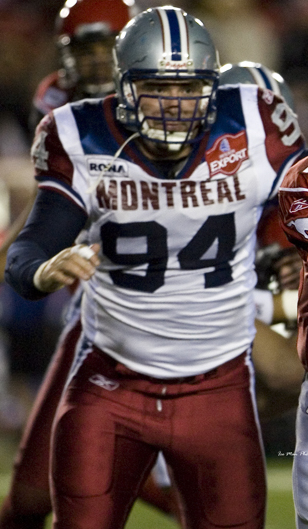
- Romero with the Montreal Alouettes in 2007

No. 94
- Position: Defensive tackle

Personal information
- Born: April 13, 1978 (age 48); Spokane, Washington, U.S.
- Listed height: 6 ft 3 in (1.91 m)
- Listed weight: 300 lb (136 kg)

Career information
- High school: Lewis and Clark High School (Spokane, Washington)
- College: Eastern Washington

Career history
- 2001: Edmonton Eskimos
- 2002–2004: Miami Dolphins
- 2006–2007: Montreal Alouettes
- 2008–2010: Edmonton Eskimos
- 2011: Saskatchewan Roughriders

Awards and highlights
- 2× CFL West All-Star (2008, 2009); 2× All-Big Sky (1999–2000)
- Stats at Pro Football Reference
- Stats at CFL.ca

Dario Romero (born April 13, 1978) is an American former professional football defensive tackle who played in the National Football League (NFL) and Canadian Football League (CFL). He was signed by the Edmonton Eskimos of the CFL as a free agent in 2001. He played college football at Eastern Washington.

== College career ==
Romero was a two-time All-Big Sky Conference player at Eastern Washington. Romero finished his college career with 22 quarterback sacks, ranking him fifth in school history.

== Professional career ==
Romero signed with the Edmonton Eskimos of the Canadian Football League as a free agent in 2001. After a year in Edmonton, Romero was signed by the Miami Dolphins of the National Football League in 2002. Romero spent three seasons with the Dolphins, appearing in 22 games with two starts and recording 3.5 sacks.

Romero did not play football in 2005, but signed as a free agent in 2006 with the Montreal Alouettes. He played in 31 regular season games for Montreal over two seasons while also playing in the 2006 Grey Cup. Romero signed with the Eskimos again in 2008 and played three more seasons in Edmonton while being named a CFL West All-Star in both 2008 and 2009.

In April, 2011, Romero signed a free agent contract with the Saskatchewan Roughriders. On April 19, 2012, he was released by the Riders. He has a son named Dario Romero (DJ) who currently lives in Spokane, Washington.
