= Pierre-Luc Yao =

Canadian football player (born 1982)

No. 35
- Position: Running back

Personal information
- Born: November 4, 1982 (age 44); Quebec City, Quebec, Canada
- Listed height: 5 ft 10 in (1.78 m)
- Listed weight: 205 lb (93 kg)

Career information
- University: Laval
- CFL draft: 2007: undrafted

Career history
- 2008: Edmonton Eskimos
- Stats at CFL.ca (archive)

Pierre-Luc Yao (born November 4, 1982) is a Canadian former professional football running back. He played five years of CIS football for the Laval Rouge et Or and won the Vanier Cup three times (2003, 2004, 2006). In 2008, Yao was signed by the Edmonton Eskimos as an undrafted free agent. He played the 18 games of the 2008 with the special teams and registered 8 tackles. He was released by the Eskimos prior to the 2009 season.
