= Bradley Robinson (Canadian football) =

American gridiron football player (born 1985)

No. 16
- Position: Defensive back

Personal information
- Born: January 24, 1985 (age 41); Duncan, South Carolina, U.S.
- Listed height: 5 ft 8 in (1.73 m)
- Listed weight: 180 lb (82 kg)

Career information
- High school: James F. Brynes
- College: Middle Tennessee State
- NFL draft: 2008: undrafted

Career history
- 2008–2009: Edmonton Eskimos
- Stats at CFL.ca

Bradley Robinson (born January 24, 1985) is a Canadian former professional football defensive back who played for the Edmonton Eskimos of the Canadian Football League. He was signed as a street free agent by the Eskimos in 2008. He played college football for the Middle Tennessee Blue Raiders.
