= Lenny Williams (Canadian football) =

American gridiron football player (born 1981)

No. 9
- Position: Cornerback

Personal information
- Born: December 16, 1981 (age 44); Lake Charles, Louisiana, U.S.
- Listed height: 5 ft 9 in (1.75 m)
- Listed weight: 190 lb (86 kg)

Career information
- High school: Lake Charles-Boston
- College: Southern
- NFL draft: 2004: 7th round, 252nd overall pick

Career history
- 2004–2005: Dallas Cowboys
- 2007–2009: Edmonton Eskimos

Lenny Williams (born December 16, 1981) is an American former professional football cornerback. He was selected 252nd overall in the seventh round of the 2004 NFL draft by the Tampa Bay Buccaneers. He played college football at Southern University. Williams later played for the Edmonton Eskimos of the Canadian Football League (CFL).
