= J. R. LaRose =

Canadian football player (born 1984)

No. 27
- Position: Safety

Personal information
- Born: February 27, 1984 (age 42); Edmonton, Alberta, Canada
- Listed height: 6 ft 0 in (1.83 m)
- Listed weight: 200 lb (91 kg)

Career information
- High school: Strathcona High School
- CJFL: Edmonton Huskies

Career history
- 2005–2008: Edmonton Eskimos
- 2010–2014: BC Lions

Awards and highlights
- Grey Cup champion (2011)
- Stats at CFL.ca (archive)

J. R. (Alozie) LaRose (born February 27, 1984) is a Canadian former professional football safety. He originally signed with the Edmonton Eskimos in 2005 as a territorial protected junior. He played for the Canadian Junior Football League's Edmonton Huskies; his team won the Canadian Bowl in 2005. He then played in the Canadian Football League for the Edmonton Eskimos and the BC Lions; his team won the Grey Cup in 2011. He continued playing in the CFL until retiring in 2014.

== Personal life ==
LaRose is a member of the Cree nation and is registered to the One Arrow First Nation in Saskatchewan. He was raised by his mother, Barbara, in Edmonton, Alberta. LaRose never met his Nigerian father as he was deported back to his home country before he was born. He now has two children and is married.

== Professional career ==
LaRose was a professional football player in the Canadian Football League for nine years. He played four seasons with the Edmonton Eskimos. In his final season with the team (2008), he severely broke his leg and ended his career with the Eskimos. In 2010, LaRose tried out for the BC Lions and made it as a backup safety, although within playing 15 games with the team he broke the same leg again. After rehabilitation he was able to play in the 2011 season as starting safety, but in the last pre-season game he broke his forearm. LaRose was able make it back for playoffs of the 2011 season and help his team to victory, winning the 2011 Grey Cup. He played two more seasons with the Lions, which included what is said to be his best season of his career. In 2013, LaRose started all 18 regular seasons games as well as picking off his first interception. After his 2013 season, he set his consecutive games played streak to 44, and beat many of his personal best records for tackles, knockdowns and fumbles.
