= Brock Ralph =

Canadian football player (born 1980)

Profile
- Positions: Wide receiver, Slotback

Personal information
- Born: July 16, 1980 (age 46); Raymond, Alberta, Canada
- Listed height: 6 ft 3 in (1.91 m)
- Listed weight: 190 lb (86 kg)

Career information
- High school: Raymond
- College: Wyoming
- CFL draft: 2002: 2nd round, 13th overall pick

Career history
- 2003–2004: Edmonton Eskimos
- 2005: Hamilton Tiger-Cats
- 2005: Edmonton Eskimos
- 2006–2007: Hamilton Tiger-Cats
- 2008: Edmonton Eskimos
- 2009–2011: Winnipeg Blue Bombers

Awards and highlights
- Grey Cup champion (2003, 2005)
- Stats at CFL.ca

Brock Ralph (born 7 July 1980) is a Canadian former professional football slotback and wide receiver.

== Early life ==
Ralph was born to Jim and Shelly Ralph in Raymond, Alberta, and attended Raymond High School, where his junior and senior football teams won consecutive provincial titles with a 25–1 record and Ralph was named the league's Most Valuable Player. He is the older brother to retired Calgary Stampeders slotback Brett Ralph. In addition to football, he played basketball and was the provincial champion in the 100 metres and triple jump. In addition to Basketball, Ralph also played Baseball and was drafted in the 15th round by the Baltimore Orioles in the 1999 Major League Baseball draft.
