= Chris Ciezki =

Canadian football player (born 1981)

Profile
- Position: Fullback

Personal information
- Born: January 6, 1981 (age 45); Edmonton, Alberta, Canada
- Listed height: 5 ft 11 in (1.80 m)
- Listed weight: 220 lb (100 kg)

Career information
- High school: Archbishop Jordan; Chaparral (Scottsdale, Arizona)
- University: British Columbia
- CFL draft: 2007: undrafted

Career history
- 2007: BC Lions*
- 2008–2010: Edmonton Eskimos
- * Offseason or practice squad member only
- Stats at CFL.ca (archive)

Chris Ciezki (born January 6, 1981) is a Canadian former professional football fullback for the Edmonton Eskimos of the Canadian Football League. In 2004 Ciezki was awarded the Wally Buono Award recognizing Canada's top junior football player. He was signed by the BC Lions as an undrafted free agent in 2007. He played CIS football for the UBC Thunderbirds. Chris retired in April 2011.
