= Brandon Guillory =

American gridiron football player (born 1983)

Profile
- Position: Defensive end

Personal information
- Born: June 28, 1983 (age 43); New Orleans, Louisiana, U.S.
- Listed height: 6 ft 4 in (1.93 m)
- Listed weight: 253 lb (115 kg)

Career information
- College: UL Monroe
- NFL draft: 2006: undrafted

Career history
- Kansas City Chiefs (2006)*; Edmonton Eskimos (2006–2008); Hamilton Tiger-Cats (2009)*
- * Offseason or practice squad member only

Awards and highlights
- 2× First-team All-Sun Belt (2004, 2005)
- Stats at CFL.ca (archive)

Brandon Guillory (June 28, 1983) is a former professional Canadian football defensive end. He was signed as an undrafted free agent by the Kansas City Chiefs in 2006. He played college football at UL Monroe. Guillory was also a member of the Edmonton Eskimos and Hamilton Tiger-Cats.
