= Justin Cooper (Canadian football) =

Canadian football player (born 1982)

No. 97
- Position: Defensive end

Personal information
- Born: July 7, 1982 (age 44); Red Deer, Alberta, Canada
- Listed height: 6 ft 0 in (1.83 m)
- Listed weight: 250 lb (113 kg)

Career information
- High school: Lindsay Thurber
- University: Manitoba
- CFL draft: 2008: 3rd round, 23rd overall pick

Career history
- 2008–2010: Edmonton Eskimos
- Stats at CFL.ca (archive)

Justin Cooper (born July 7, 1982) is a Canadian former professional football defensive end. He most recently played for the Edmonton Eskimos of the Canadian Football League (CFL).

== Early life ==
Cooper played for the Edmonton Huskies of the Canadian Junior Football League and attended the Calgary Stampeders training camps in 2004 and 2005. He then attended the University of Manitoba to play CIS football for the Manitoba Bisons from 2005 through 2007, where he was a Canada West All-Star in 2006 and 2007, 2007 first team All-Canadian, 2007 Canada West Most Outstanding Lineman, and 2007 East West Bowl Defensive Most Valuable Player. His Manitoba Bisons were also the 2007 national championship Vanier Cup winners.

== Professional career ==
Cooper was drafted 23rd overall by the Eskimos in the 2008 CFL draft and played in all 18 regular season games of the 2008 CFL season including one start and scored his first CFL touchdown in the first quarter of the East Final against Montreal when he blocked a punt, which forced a fumble that he recovered in the end zone.
