= Derek Schiavone =

Canadian football player (born 1985)

Profile
- Positions: Kicker, Punter

Personal information
- Born: May 9, 1985 (age 41); Fort Erie, Ontario, Canada
- Listed height: 6 ft 0 in (1.83 m)
- Listed weight: 205 lb (93 kg)

Career information
- High school: Lakeshore
- University: Western Ontario
- CFL draft: 2008: undrafted

Career history
- 2008–2012: Edmonton Eskimos
- 2012–2013: Montreal Alouettes
- 2014: Ottawa Redblacks*
- * Offseason or practice squad member only
- Stats at CFL.ca

Derek Schiavone (born May 9, 1985) is a Canadian former professional football kicker and punter who played in the Canadian Football League (CFL). He was signed by the Edmonton Eskimos as an undrafted free agent in 2008. He also played for the Montreal Alouettes. He played CIS football for the Western Ontario Mustangs. He was released by the Ottawa Redblacks on April 16, 2014.
