= Glenn Carson (Canadian football) =

Canadian football player (born 1978)

Glenn Carson (born August 19, 1978 in Melfort, Saskatchewan) is a former Canadian football offensive lineman. He was last a member of the Toronto Argonauts.

He was traded to Toronto from Edmonton on January 15, 2007 in exchange for the Argos' 2nd round (13th overall) selection in the 2007 CFL draft.
