= Jason Goss =

American gridiron football player (born 1979)

Profile
- Position: Defensive back

Personal information
- Born: October 4, 1979 (age 47); Fort Worth, Texas, U.S.
- Listed height: 5 ft 10 in (1.78 m)
- Listed weight: 183 lb (83 kg)

Career information
- High school: O. D. Wyatt
- College: Texas Christian

Career history
- 2003: Chicago Bears*
- 2003: Arizona Cardinals
- 2004–2006: Hamilton Tiger-Cats
- 2007–2010: Edmonton Eskimos
- * Offseason or practice squad member only

Awards and highlights
- CFL All-Star (2008); CFL West All-Star (2008); 2× Eskimos' Most Outstanding Defensive Player (2007, 2008); Eskimos records: Most interception return yards – game (144) - September 2008; Most interception return touchdowns – game (2) - September 2008
- Stats at Pro Football Reference
- Stats at CFL.ca

Jason Goss (born October 4, 1979) is an American former professional football defensive back who played in the National Football League (NFL) and Canadian Football League (CFL). He has played five seasons in the CFL and was named CFL All-Star in 2008.

Goss was released by the Eskimos on December 16, 2010.
