= Kamau Peterson =

American gridiron football player and coach (born 1978)

No. 8
- Position: Wide receiver

Personal information
- Born: September 16, 1978 (age 48); Los Angeles, California, U.S.
- Listed height: 6 ft 1 in (1.85 m)
- Listed weight: 195 lb (88 kg)

Career information
- High school: Sandwich
- College: New Hampshire
- CFL draft: 2001: 1st round, 6th overall pick

Career history

Playing
- 2001–2003: Calgary Stampeders
- 2004–2005: Winnipeg Blue Bombers
- 2005–2006: Hamilton Tiger-Cats
- 2007–2010: Edmonton Eskimos
- 2011: BC Lions

Coaching
- 2014–2016: York Lions (RC/Associate OC)
- 2017–2019: York Lions (OC)

Awards and highlights
- Grey Cup champion (2001); CFL Most Outstanding Canadian (2008); Dr. Beattie Martin Trophy (2008); 2× CFL West All-Star (2007–2008)
- Stats at CFL.ca

Kamau Peterson (born September 16, 1978) is a former professional Canadian football wide receiver and formerly the offensive coordinator for the York Lions football team. He last played for the BC Lions of the Canadian Football League. He was originally drafted sixth overall by the Calgary Stampeders in the 2001 CFL draft and won the 89th Grey Cup with the team that year. Although he was born in Los Angeles, California, United States, Peterson grew up in Detroit, Michigan, but was schooled in LaSalle, Ontario, so he counts as a non-import in the CFL.

Kamau transitioned into his post-football career by founding PlaymakerU which trained young athletes in many sports but especially football. Based in Sherwood Park, Alberta he operated out of a new facility there. Peterson entered into coaching in 2012, serving as receivers coach on Team Canada's Jr. National (U19) Team from 2012 through 2016, earning 2 golds and a silver medal in world championship play. (Texas 2012, Kuwait 2014, Harbin 2016) From there he joined the York University football staff as receivers coach and assistant OC in 2014, taking over as offensive coordinator from 2017 through 2019 before moving on from York in 2020. During his time at York, Peterson spearheaded the resurgence of the York Offence, as well as served as their strength and conditioning coach.
