= Jason Nugent =

Canadian football player (born 1982)

Profile
- Position: Defensive back

Personal information
- Born: May 18, 1982 (age 44); Scarborough, Ontario
- Listed height: 6 ft 0 in (1.83 m)
- Listed weight: 210 lb (95 kg)

Career information
- High school: St. Thomas Aquinas
- College: Rutgers
- CFL draft: 2006: 2nd round, 17th overall pick

Career history
- 2006: Edmonton Eskimos
- 2007–2008: Winnipeg Blue Bombers
- 2009–2010: Edmonton Eskimos
- 2011: Winnipeg Blue Bombers
- 2011: Calgary Stampeders*
- * Offseason or practice squad member only
- Stats at CFL.ca

Jason Nugent (born May 18, 1982) is a Canadian former professional football defensive back. He most recently played for the Calgary Stampeders of the Canadian Football League. He was drafted by the Edmonton Eskimos in the second round of the 2006 CFL draft. He played college football at Rutgers.
