= Kevin Challenger =

Canadian football player (born 1982)

No. 84
- Position: Wide receiver

Personal information
- Born: May 4, 1982 (age 44); Montreal, Quebec
- Listed height: 5 ft 8 in (1.73 m)
- Listed weight: 178 lb (81 kg)

Career information
- College: Boston College, Vanier College
- CFL draft: 2007: 2nd round, 14th overall pick

Career history
- 2007–2008: Calgary Stampeders
- 2009–2010: Edmonton Eskimos
- Stats at CFL.ca (archive)

Kevin Challenger (born May 4, 1982) is a Canadian former professional football wide receiver. He was released by the Edmonton Eskimos of the Canadian Football League on June 24, 2010. He was drafted by the Calgary Stampeders in the second round of the 2007 CFL draft. He played college football for the Boston College Eagles. Before that, he played for the Vanier College Cheetahs. Kevin Challenger also holds an annual football camp for up and coming football players in Montreal, Quebec it is held for 2 days.
