= Taylor Inglis =

Canadian football player

Profile
- Position: Long snapper

Personal information
- Born: November 4, 1983 (age 43); Edmonton, Alberta, Canada
- Listed height: 6 ft 2 in (1.88 m)
- Listed weight: 252 lb (114 kg)

Career information
- CJFL: Edmonton Wildcats
- University: Alberta
- CFL draft: 2005: undrafted

Career history
- 2005–2010: Edmonton Eskimos
- 2010: Winnipeg Blue Bombers
- 2011: Edmonton Eskimos

Awards and highlights
- Grey Cup champion (2005)
- Stats at CFL.ca

Taylor Inglis (born November 4, 1983) is a Canadian former professional football long snapper who played in the Canadian Football League with the Winnipeg Blue Bombers and Edmonton Eskimos. He played in the CJFL for the Edmonton Wildcats.

He announced his retirement from football on May 10, 2012.
