= Mike Bradley (Canadian football) =

Canadian football player (born 1978)

Mike Bradley (born September 16, 1978 in Richmond Hill, Ontario) is a former Canadian Football League (CFL) running back for the Edmonton Eskimos. He attended Haliburton Highlands Secondary School (HHSS). In Bradley's senior year, he ran a 10:84 in the 100m which remains the school's record to this day. He is a graduate from the University of Waterloo, where he started in 1997. He is now a Durham Regional Police Staff Sergeant.

== See also ==
- List of University of Waterloo people
