= Andrew Nowacki =

Canadian football player (born 1980)

No. 88
- Position: Wide receiver

Personal information
- Born: October 10, 1980 (age 46); Stoney Creek, Ontario Canada
- Listed height: 6 ft 0 in (1.83 m)
- Listed weight: 198 lb (90 kg)

Career information
- College: Murray State
- CFL draft: 2004: 3rd round, 26th overall pick

Career history
- 2004–2011: Edmonton Eskimos

Awards and highlights
- Grey Cup champion (2005)
- Stats at CFL.ca (archive)

Andrew Nowacki (born October 10, 1980) is a Canadian former professional football wide receiver. He last played for the Edmonton Eskimos of the Canadian Football League. He was selected by the Eskimos in the third round of the 2004 CFL draft. He played college football for the Murray State Racers.

== College career ==
Nowacki began his collegiate career at Scottsdale Community College before transferring after two seasons to Murray State University. From 2001 to 2003, Nowacki played in 24 games recording 53 receptions for 608 receiving yards. He led the Racers in receiving as a redshirt senior with 43 catches for 477 yards.

== Professional career ==
Nowacki was selected in the third round (26th overall) by the Edmonton Eskimos in the 2004 CFL draft. As a rookie, Nowacki rarely played only recording one catch for seven yards. Entering 2005, Nowacki's roster spot was in jeopardy before the Eskimos final season against the Winnipeg Blue Bombers. He ended up on the team's inactive list to begin the season. He was activated on July 14 after running back Mike Bradley suffered a knee injury. After making a few appearances, Nowacki suffered a finger injury causing him to miss a few games. He was re–activated on September 29. In 2005, Nowacki recorded 18 catches for a total of 151 yards. Following the selection of Pat Woodcock by Edmonton in the CFL Dispersal Draft, Nowacki was possibly going to lose his job as the Eskimos fifth receiver. Despite the Woodcock selection, Nowacki recorded 17 catches for 147 yards in 2006. He was re-signed by Edmonton on January 11, 2007. In the Eskimos first preseason game on June 16, 2007, Nowacki recorded four receptions for a total of 46 yards. After a few injuries to the Eskimos receivers to begin the season, Nowacki began to take a bigger role in the offense. On August 13, 2007, in a game against the Hamilton Tiger-Cats, Nowacki caught his first career touchdown pass. On the following possession for Hamilton their receiver Jason French also a Murray State University graduate, caught a touchdown. The two touchdown catches for Nowacki and French came one minute apart. In the game where quarterback Ricky Ray broke Warren Moon's Eskimos record for most passing yards in Eskimos history, Nowacki caught a five-yard touchdown pass. In 2007, Nowacki had 47 receptions for 465 yards with two touchdowns. In 2008, Nowacki played in every game recording 28 catches for 369 yards with two touchdowns. He started the West Semi-Final and caught three passes for 27 yards.

== Personal life ==
He married his girlfriend Erica on February 14, 2009. His sister Renata coaches volleyball at Southeast Missouri State University.
