= Shannon Garrett =

American gridiron football player and coach (born 1972)

Profile
- Positions: Linebacker, Defensive back

Personal information
- Born: January 24, 1972 (age 54); Bay St. Louis, Mississippi, U.S.
- Listed height: 5 ft 10 in (1.78 m)
- Listed weight: 195 lb (88 kg)

Career information
- College: Mississippi College

Career history

Playing
- 1995–1997: Winnipeg Blue Bombers
- 1998–1999: Saskatchewan Roughriders
- 2000–2008: Edmonton Eskimos

Coaching
- 2013–2014: Alberta Golden Bears (DB coach)

Awards and highlights
- 2× Grey Cup champion (2003, 2005); 2× CFL West All-Star (2001, 2003); Mississippi College Hall of Fame (2008)
- Stats at CFL.ca

Shannon Garrett (born January 24, 1972) is a former professional Canadian football defensive back and linebacker who played fourteen seasons in the Canadian Football League.

== Early life ==
Garrett was born on January 24, 1972, in Bay St. Louis, Mississippi. He was a four-year college football starter at Mississippi College and was nominated as an All-American, All-Gulf South Conference (GSC), and ALL-GSC Academic. He was inducted into the Mississippi College Hall of Fame in April 2008.

== Professional career ==
Garrett began his pro career with the Winnipeg Blue Bombers in the 1995 CFL season and played three seasons there before moving on to the Saskatchewan Roughriders for the 1998 and 1999 CFL seasons. After being released following a training camp try-out with the New Orleans Saints of the National Football League in 2000, Garrett joined the Edmonton Eskimos in September of the 2000 CFL season and remained with the organisation until his retirement in March 2009.
