= Jonté Buhl =

American gridiron football player (born 1982)

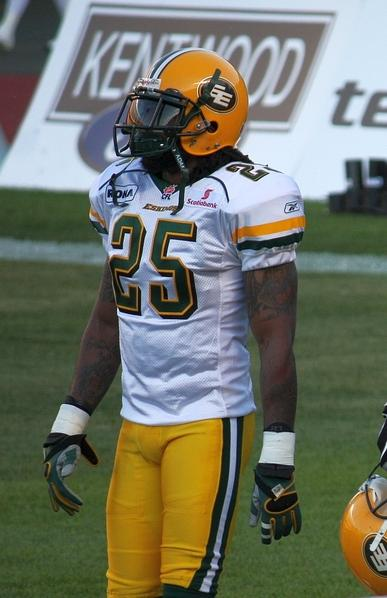
- Buhl with the Edmonton Eskimos

No. 25
- Position: Cornerback

Personal information
- Born: April 4, 1982 (age 44); San Antonio, Texas, U.S.
- Listed height: 5 ft 9 in (1.75 m)
- Listed weight: 170 lb (77 kg)

Career information
- High school: Connally (Pflugerville, Texas)
- College: Texas A&M
- NFL draft: 2005: undrafted

Career history
- 2005: Atlanta Falcons*
- 2006: Tampa Bay Buccaneers*
- 2006–2009: Edmonton Eskimos
- * Offseason or practice squad member only
- Stats at CFL.ca (archive)

Jonté Buhl (born April 4, 1982) is an American former professional football cornerback who played four seasons for the Edmonton Eskimos of the Canadian Football League (CFL). He played college football at Texas A&M University and originally signed with the Atlanta Falcons of the National Football League.

== Early life ==
Buhl attended John B. Connally High School in Pflugerville, Texas, where he was a high school All-American and played both defense and offense positions. As a senior, he had 60 tackles and 5 interceptions and rushed for 682 yards and 10 touchdowns. In addition to football, he was on the basketball and track teams and was one of the nation's top prep quarter-milers, posting the nation's top indoor 400-meter time (46.77) in 2000.

== College career ==
Buhl finished his collegiate career at Texas A&M with 144 tackles, three interceptions, 16 knockdowns, two forced fumbles and two fumble recoveries, including a school-record 98-yard fumble return for a touchdown against Texas his senior year. After his senior year, he was named to the 2004 Associated Press Honorable Mention All-Big 12 Team. Buhl's cousin, Detron Smith, also played for the Aggies and later for the Denver Broncos.

Buhl also competed in track for the Aggies, As a freshman, he ran for the indoor 4x400-meter relay that placed seventh at nationals. He placed eighth in the indoor 400 in his first conference meet and improved to sixth at the Big 12 outdoor meet. He was the team's top entry in the 400 with a best time of 48.21 indoors and 47.03 outdoors. After his freshman year, he was named an All-American, but did not compete in track for two years while concentrating on football. Buhl had a successful return to the oval, running on the NCAA champion 1600m relay as a senior.

== Professional career ==
Buhl was signed as an undrafted free agent by the Atlanta Falcons on May 16, 2005. He was later released on September 4, 2005.

Buhl signed a reserve/future contract with the Tampa Bay Buccaneers on January 11, 2006. He was released on February 23, 2006.

Buhl signed with the Edmonton Eskimos in 2006 and played in 15 games (13 starts) for the Eskimos that year, recording 35 defensive tackles, four special teams tackles, one tackle for a loss, six knockdowns, one interception two forced fumbles and two fumble returns for 19 yards.

In 2007, Buhl started the first three games of the season before suffering a season-ending injury when he broke his wrist in Winnipeg on July 13. He recorded nine defensive tackles, one forced fumble and a 19-yard interception.

In the 2008 season, Buhl started in all 18 games, recording 18 tackles, four special teams tackles, four knockdowns, four interceptions returned for 46 yards, and one quarterback sack. He also started in both playoff games, compiling a total of two tackles.

Buhl signed a multi-year contract extension with the Eskimos in January 2009.
