= Dan Comiskey =

Canadian football player (born 1972)

No. 67
- Position: Guard

Personal information
- Born: June 30, 1972 (age 54); Windsor, Ontario, Canada
- Listed height: 6 ft 5 in (1.96 m)
- Listed weight: 302 lb (137 kg)

Career information
- University: Windsor
- CFL draft: 1997: 6th round, 42nd overall pick

Career history
- 1997–2001: Saskatchewan Roughriders
- 2002–2004: Edmonton Eskimos
- 2005: Hamilton Tiger-Cats
- 2005–2008: Edmonton Eskimos
- 2010: Calgary Stampeders

Awards and highlights
- 2× Grey Cup champion (2003, 2005); 2× CFL West All-Star (2003, 2006); Eskimos' Most Outstanding Canadian Player (2006)
- Stats at CFL.ca

Dan Comiskey (born June 30, 1972) is a Canadian former professional football offensive lineman, turned professional speaker, who played 13 seasons for the Saskatchewan Roughriders, Hamilton Tiger-Cats, Edmonton Eskimos, and Calgary Stampeders of the Canadian Football League (CFL). He was drafted in the fifth round of the 1997 CFL draft by the Roughriders. He played CIS football for the Windsor Lancers.

On Tuesday, May 18, 2010 it was announced that Comiskey had signed a contract with the Calgary Stampeders.
