= Patrick Kabongo =

Gridiron football player (born 1979)

No. 56
- Position: G

Personal information
- Born: June 27, 1979 (age 47); Kinshasa, Zaire
- Listed height: 6 ft 6 in (1.98 m)
- Listed weight: 364 lb (165 kg)

Career information
- High school: Vanier College
- College: Nebraska
- CFL draft: 2003: 3rd round, 19th overall pick

Career history
- 2004: Detroit Lions*
- 2004: Ottawa Renegades*
- 2004–2011: Edmonton Eskimos
- 2012–2013: BC Lions
- * Offseason or practice squad member only

Awards and highlights
- Grey Cup champion (2005); CFL All-Star (2008); Eskimos' Most Outstanding Canadian Player (2009); Eskimos' Most Outstanding Offensive Lineman (2009); 2× CFLPA Pro Player All Star Team (2007, 2008)
- Stats at CFL.ca

Watshidimba "Patrick" Kabongo (born June 27, 1979) is a former professional Canadian football offensive lineman who played for 10 seasons in the Canadian Football League with the Edmonton Eskimos and BC Lions. He signed as a free agent with the Detroit Lions before joining the Ottawa Renegades practice roster. He then joined the Eskimos where he was part of their 93rd Grey Cup championship team in 2005. After his release from Edmonton in January 2012, he signed with the BC Lions on June 4, 2012. He also played defensive tackle for Nebraska.
