= Trinity League =

High school athletic league in California

The Trinity League is a high school athletic conference in Southern California, part of the CIF Southern Section. The League is regarded as one of the most competitive high school leagues in the United States. Most famous for football, the Trinity League is extremely competitive in its other sports as well. Baseball, tennis, and water polo players are top recruits and are some of the most talented Division 1 players in the nation. This makes the Trinity League the toughest league in high school sports. For the fall 2023 season, High School Football America rated it the toughest league in the nation, with the top two nationally ranked teams and five out of the six ranked the top 300. In 2021, three of the six programs had been ranked in the top 10 in the country, with five in the top 200.

== Members ==
The league currently includes six high schools, five in Orange County and one in Los Angeles County. Orange Lutheran, which joined in 2006, is the only member which is not a Catholic school.

School	City	Founded	Enrollment	Nickname
JSerra Catholic High School	San Juan Capistrano, California	2003	1,150	Lions
Mater Dei High School	Santa Ana, California	1950	2,100	Monarchs
Orange Lutheran High School	Orange, California	1973	1,322	Lancers
Santa Margarita High School	Rancho Santa Margarita, California	1987	1,700	Eagles
Servite High School	Anaheim, California	1958	920	Friars
St. John Bosco High School	Bellflower, California	1940	820	Braves

== History ==
=== Angelus League ===
The Trinity League is the latest iteration of what was originally known as the Angelus League, founded in 1961 to match Catholic high schools—the Angelus is a Catholic devotion. The founding members were Servite (Anaheim), Mater Dei (Santa Ana), St. Paul (Santa Fe Springs), Cantwell (Montebello), and Salesian (Los Angeles). Cantwell and Salesian soon dropped out of the league, due to its competitiveness, and were replaced by St. John Bosco (Bellflower) and Verbum Dei (Los Angeles).

From the outset, the league was marked by intense football rivalries, notably between Mater Dei, Servite, and St. Paul. Some games drew crowds in excess of 10,000 people, and violence was not uncommon. The intensity increased even further in 1967, when St. John Bosco and Verbum Dei dropped out and were replaced by Bishop Amat (La Puente) and Pius X (Downey). Along with St. Anthony (Long Beach), the iconic members of the Angelus League were now set.

Things shifted again in the late 1970s. St. Anthony dropped in 1977 and was replaced by Bishop Montgomery (Torrance). Pius X dropped in 1980, then Bishop Montgomery in 1981. In 1982, Pius X returned and a new member, Serra (Gardena) joined. Serra dropped in 1984 and was replaced by Bishop Montgomery again. In 1986 Pius X was gone and replaced by St. Bernard, which only lasted two years, dropping in 1988.

The 1980s saw the league produce future NFLers like Ed Luther (St. Paul), John Sciarra (Bishop Amat), Paul McDonald (Bishop Amat), Turk Schonert (Servite), Derek Brown (Servite), and Steve Beuerlein, who led Servite to the first of five consecutive CIF championships. Todd Marinovich also played for Mater Dei for two years, before transferring to Capistrano Valley. Major boys' basketball rivalries also emerged in the 1980s, with Mater Dei becoming a powerhouse and Bishop Montgomery capturing multiple California State Championships. Girls' sports were introduced, replacing the former Sunrise League, with St. Joseph's (Lakewood) and Rosary (Fullerton) joining the league.

=== Breakup ===
In 1989 Bishop Montgomery and founding member St. Paul dropped and were replaced by Loyola High School and St. John Bosco. Santa Margarita, which had opened its doors in 1987, joined the in 1990, but this would mark the beginning of the end for the Angelus League.

As the only member in South Orange County, Santa Margarita faced longer distances to travel for away games than any other school, and their principal sought to get them admitted to a more local public school league. The public high schools strongly opposed the move, observing that their recruitment was limited to their school district, whereas the private schools had no geographic restrictions on recruitment. Nevertheless, the push to "regionalize" Catholic school sports won out, and the Angelus League was disbanded at the end of the 1991–92 school year. Angelus League teams had won 30 Southern Section championships in its 31 years, including 11 in football.

Starting fall 1992, Bishop Amat, St. John Bosco, and Loyola entered the Del Rey League, joining other Catholic schools in Los Angeles County. The others members were dispersed among public school leagues in Orange County: Santa Margarita to the Sea View League, Servite and Rosary the Sunset League before moving to the Golden West League, and Mater Dei the South Coast League.

=== Serra League ===
In 1999, the league was re-formed as a football-only league called the Serra League (named for Catholic missionary Junípero Serra), with Servite, Mater Dei, St. John Bosco, and Santa Margarita at its core. In 2001, the Southern Section council approved Bishop Amat and Loyola to join the league, in essence reconstituting the old Angelus League.

This lasted until 2006, when Loyola and Bishop Amat were moved to the Mission League and were replaced by Orange Lutheran and JSerra. The post-realignment conference was renamed the Trinity League.

=== Reconfiguration ===
In 2008, Rosary Academy became the only all-girls school in the conference. St. Margaret's Episcopal School joined the league as a lacrosse affiliate in 2005, winning the Trinity League title from 2007-2013 before its departure in 2015.

In May 2023, high school athletic directors in Orange County and neighboring areas approved a controversial realignment for 2024–25 that would create football-only leagues, based on each school's recent performance as rated by the website CalPreps.com. The Trinity League was exempted from the system in the final proposal submitted to CIF-SS. As part of the realignment, however, Rosary Academy was set to leave the Trinity League to join the new Pacific Coast Conference, leaving the Trinity League at 4 schools for girls.

== Champions ==
=== Football ===
The Trinity League is one of the most competitive high school football leagues in the country. St. John Bosco was declared winner of the 2022 and 2019 High School Football America National Championship, and Mater Dei were national champions in 1994, 1996, 2017, 2018, 2020, 2021, 2023, and 2024. From 2016 to 2021, these two schools alone sent 130 players to NCAA Division I football programs, and their rivalry and recruiting efforts have been compared to the D1 level.

The league was named the toughest in the nation by MaxPreps in 2019, and the second toughest in 2013 and 2010. MaxPreps also named Mater Dei, St. John Bosco, and Servite as the teams with the second, third, and fifth toughest schedules in the nation for the 2022 season.

Year	Team	Record
2026	Santa Margarita	5-0-0
2025	Santa Margarita/Mater Dei/St. John Bosco	4-1-0
2024	Mater Dei	5-0-0
2023	Mater Dei	5-0-0
2022	St. John Bosco	4-1-0
2021	Mater Dei	5-0-0
2020	Mater Dei	5-0-0
2019	St. John Bosco	5–0–0
2018	Mater Dei	5–0–0
2017	Mater Dei	5–0–0
2016	Mater Dei	5–0–0
2015	St. John Bosco	5–0–0
2014	St. John Bosco	5–0–0
2013	St. John Bosco	5–0–0
2012	St. John Bosco	5–0–0
2011	Servite	5–0–0
2010	Servite	5–0–0
2009	Servite	5–0–0
2008	Servite/Mater Dei	4–1–0
2007	Servite	4–1–0
2006	Orange Lutheran	4–1–0

=== Basketball ===
Mater Dei, Santa Margarita and St. John Bosco are the only schools to have won a Trinity League title in basketball, with Mater Dei having won 16 outright championships as well as a split with St. John Bosco. St. John Bosco has won one sole title and split one with Mater Dei. Santa Margarita won their first in 2025 with a split title with the Braves of St. John Bosco. Beginning in 2026 the champion was determined by a Trinity League Tournament. Santa Margarita beat St. John Bosco in the inaugural event 57-56 after both going 4-1 in league play.

Year	Team	Record
2026	Santa Margarita	4-1
2025	Santa Margarita/St. John Bosco	8-2
2024	Mater Dei	9-1
2023	St. John Bosco	9-1
2022	Mater Dei	9-0
2021	Mater Dei	9-1
2020	Mater Dei	9-1
2019	St. John Bosco/Mater Dei	4-1
2018	Mater Dei	9-1
2017	Mater Dei	10-0
2016	Mater Dei	10-0
2015	Mater Dei	10-0
2014	Mater Dei	10-0
2013	Mater Dei	10-0
2012	Mater Dei	10-0
2011	Mater Dei	9-1
2010	Mater Dei	10-0
2009	Mater Dei	10-0
2008	Mater Dei	10-0
2007	Mater Dei	10-0

== Notable athletic alumni ==
=== JSerra ===
- Nick Harris (2015), current NFL offensive lineman for the Seattle Seahawks
- Austin Hedges (2011), current MLB catcher for the Cleveland Guardians
- Royce Lewis (2017), first overall pick in the 2017 Major League Baseball draft, currently with Minnesota Twins
- Dante Pettis (2014), current NFL wide receiver
- Chase Strumpf (2016), a second baseman in the Chicago Cubs organization
- Davis Wendzel (2016), a third baseman in the Texas Rangers organization
- Avery Williams (2016), NFL running back for the Atlanta Falcons

=== Mater Dei ===
- Matt Barkley (2009), NFL quarterback for the San Francisco 49ers
- Colt Brennan (2002), former NFL quarterback for the Oakland Raiders and Washington Redskins
- LeRon Ellis (1987), former NBA power forward and center for the Miami Heat, Charlotte Hornets, and Los Angeles Clippers
- Danny Espinosa (2005), current MLB second baseman for the Washington Nationals
- Reggie Geary (1992), former NBA guard for the San Antonio Spurs and Cleveland Cavaliers
- Tiki Ghosn (1995), defensive back on the undefeated National Championship team in 1995; professional mixed martial arts fighter, at one time competing in Strikeforce MMA, the WEC, and the Ultimate Fighting Championship
- Matt Grootegoed (2000), former NFL linebacker for the Detroit Lions and Tampa Bay Buccaneers
- Vince Hizon (1988), American-born former Philippine Basketball Association player
- Khaled Holmes (2008), former NFL Center for the Indianapolis Colts
- Mike Hopkins (1988), former NCAA basketball guard, former assistant coach at Syracuse University and current head coach at Washington Huskies
- John Huarte (1960), Heisman Trophy winner (1964) at Notre Dame and former NFL quarterback for the Bears, Chiefs, Eagles, Patriots, and Jets
- Chris Jackson (1988), former NFL Wide receiver for the Dolphins, Packers, Titans, Seahawks, & Buccaneers
- Stanley Johnson (2014), No. 1 F/G recruit commits to play at Arizona Wildcats.
- Taylor King (2007), former NCAA basketball forward for Villanova University
- Matt Leinart (2001), Heisman Trophy winner (2004) and former NFL quarterback
- Bobby Meacham (1978), current MLB First-Base Coach for the Houston Astros and former shortstop for the New York Yankees
- Kaleena Mosqueda-Lewis (2011), current NCAA women's basketball guard for the University of Connecticut Huskies
- Robbie Rogers (2005), former MLS winger for the Los Angeles Galaxy
- Jamal Sampson (2001), former NBA forward-center for the Bucks, Lakers, Hornets, Kings, and Nuggets
- Sergio Santos (2002), current MLB relief pitcher for the Toronto Blue Jays
- Miles Simon (1994), current NCAA basketball analyst for ESPN and former NBA guard for the Orlando Magic
- D. J. Strawberry (2003), former NBA point guard for the Phoenix Suns
- Matt Treanor (1994), current MLB catcher for the Los Angeles Dodgers
- David Wear (2009), former NCAA basketball forward for the UCLA Bruins
- Travis Wear (2009), former NCAA Basketball forward for the UCLA Bruins
- Larry Williams, NFL player
- Max Wittek (2011), former NCAA football quarterback for the USC Trojans
- Greg Woepse silver medalist at the 1979 Pan Am Games in the pole vault
- JT Daniels (2017) Current Starting Quarterback for the Georgia Bulldogs after transferring from the USC Trojans
- Amon-Ra St. Brown (2018) Current Wide Receiver for the Detroit Lions
- Bryce Young (2020) Current Quarterback for the Carolina Panthers

=== Servite ===
- Steve Beuerlein (1983), Former Notre Dame and NFL quarterback.
- Derek Brown (1989), NFL running back
- Steve Buechele (1979), MLB third baseman.
- Patrick Cantlay (2010), golfer
- Sean Estrada (2003), University of Pennsylvania, San Francisco 49ers Offensive lineman.
- Cody Fajardo (2010), quarterback at the University of Nevada
- Ben Francisco (1999), MLB outfielder for the Philadelphia Phillies
- Chris Galippo (2007), Middle Linebacker at University of Southern California and US Army Bowl MVP
- Ryan Garko (1999), MLB first baseman for the Seattle Mariners
- A. J. Gass (1993), former CFL player.
- Dennis Sean Houlton (1997), MLB pitcher
- Cole Irvin (2012), MLB pitcher for the Oakland Athletics
- Frank Kalil (1977), NFL & USFL center
- Ryan Kalil (2003), Offensive lineman at the University of Southern California starting center for the Carolina Panthers.
- Matt Kalil (2008), offensive tackle at USC and member of the Minnesota Vikings
- Blaine Nye (1964), former NFL offensive lineman, and economics consultant.
- Chris Pontius, (2005) soccer player, D.C. United midfielder
- Marc Rzepczynski (2003), Major League Baseball pitcher
- Turk Schonert (1975), former Stanford and NFL quarterback, former Buffalo Bills offensive coordinator
- Matt Slater (2003), NFL wide receiver for the New England Patriots
- Kurt Vollers (1997), former NFL tackle
- Matt Willis (2002), NFL Wide receiver for the Denver Broncos
- Mike Witt (1978), MLB pitcher, pitched perfect game September 30, 1984.
- Mason Graham (2022) Current Defensive Lineman for the Cleveland Browns
- Tetairoa McMillan (2022) Current Wide Receiver for the Carolina Panthers

=== St. John Bosco ===
- Josh Rosen (2014), former UCLA and current Miami Dolphins quarterback
- Steve Carfino (1980), former basketball player for the Iowa Hawkeyes and Australian National Basketball League
- James Cotton (1992), former NBA player with the Seattle SuperSonics
- Joe Cowan (2003), holds numerous school records in track and field as well as football; played for the UCLA Bruins' football program.
- Patrick Cowan (2004), former starting quarterback for the UCLA Bruins; signed but released by the New Orleans Saints
- Tim DeRuyter (1981), American football coach
- Nomar Garciaparra (1991), former MLB player with the Boston Red Sox, Chicago Cubs, Los Angeles Dodgers, and Oakland Athletics; most famous for his tenure with Boston Red Sox as a member of the "Holy Trinity of Shortstop", along with Derek Jeter and Alex Rodriguez.
- Jelani Gardner (1992), former McDonald's All American basketball player for Cal and Pepperdine
- Todd Husak (1996), former Stanford University and NFL quarterback
- Dennis Lamp (1971), former MLB pitcher for the Chicago Cubs (1977–80), Chicago White Sox (1981–83), Toronto Blue Jays (1984–86), Oakland Athletics (1987), Boston Red Sox (1988–91) and Pittsburgh Pirates.
- Evan Longoria (2003), San Francisco Giants third baseman.
- Leon McFadden (2009), Cleveland Browns cornerback
- Keith Price (2009), starting quarterback for the Washington Huskies football team
- Bud Smith (1996), MLB pitcher for the St. Louis Cardinals during the 2001–2002 season. He is noted for being one of only 18 pitchers in MLB history since 1900 to throw a no-hitter during their rookie season
- Bryce Treggs (2012), former wide receiver for Cal and in the NFL with the San Francisco 49ers, Cleveland Browns and Philadelphia Eagles

=== Santa Margarita Catholic ===
- Griffin Canning, pitcher for the New York Mets
- Gavin Escobar, National Football League tight end for the Dallas Cowboys
- Kris Farris, football player
- Erika Figge, member of the United States women's national water polo team, 2007 Pan American Games Gold medalist
- Brian Finneran, former National Football League wide receiver for the Atlanta Falcons
- Beau Hossler, Amateur golfer, finished 29th at 2012 U.S. Open
- Michael Hoyos, Argentine soccer player
- Jared Hughes, Former MLB pitcher for the Pittsburgh Pirates
- Katie McLaughlin, swimmer
- Carson Palmer, two-time Pro Bowl National Football League quarterback formerly played for Arizona Cardinals, 2002 Heisman Trophy winner
- Doug Reinhardt, American League baseball player and television personality.
- Mark Restelli, Canadian Football League linebacker currently playing for Edmonton Eskimos
- Chris Rix, starting quarterback for the Florida State Seminoles (2001–2004), now broadcast announcer for Fox Sports
- Amy Rodriguez, member of the United States women's national soccer team, 2008 Summer Olympics Gold medalist
- Jason Stiles – American football player
- Klay Thompson, 4x NBA champion, 5 all-star game appearances, 5x all pro for the Dallas Mavericks
- Mychel Thompson, former player for the Cleveland Cavaliers (NBA)
- Trayce Thompson, baseball player
- Max Tuerk, ( January 27, 1994 – June 20, 2020) chosen in the 2016–2017 NFL draft for the San Diego Chargers, played at USC and started all four years left tackle

=== Orange Lutheran ===
- Cole Winn, pitcher in the Texas Rangers organization. Top prospect and picked #15 overall.
- Garrett Mitchell, outfielder and top prospect in the Milwaukee Brewers organization. Picked in 1st round in 2020.
- Derrek Chan, NY Red Bulls II Goalkeeper
- Stanley Berryhill III, wide receiver for the Atlanta Falcons
- Jason Martin, outfielder for the Texas Rangers, Pittsburgh Pirates, and the Los Angeles Dodgers
- Gabe York, shooting guard for the Indiana Pacers. Played 4 years at the University of Arizona
- Gerrit Cole, pitcher for the New York Yankees, and previously the Pittsburgh Pirates and Houston Astros. Regarded Former #1 overall pick.
- Brandon Maurer, former MLB pitcher for the Seattle Mariners, San Diego Padres, and the Kansas City Royals
- Austin Pettis, former wide receiver for the St. Louis Rams and Boise State
- Aaron Corp, former top recruit of USC; finished college career at Richmond. Signed to practice squads for Buffalo Bills, Dallas Cowboys, and Miami Dolphins
- Andrew Thurman, former second round pick of the Houston Astros. Spent time in the Astros, Braves, and Dodgers organizations over his MLB career
- Hannes Daube, member of the Men's USA Water Polo team, competed in the 2020 Summer Olympics
- Amber Neben, cyclist for the US Cycling Team, competed in the 2008, 2012, 2016, and 2020 Summer Olympics
- Mikey Romero, first round MLB Draft Pick to the Boston Red Sox, brother to Sierra and Sydney Romero (professional softball players)
