= Keith Taylor (cornerback) =

American football player (born 1998)

Profile
- Position: Cornerback

Personal information
- Born: November 20, 1998 (age 27); Long Beach, California, U.S.
- Listed height: 6 ft 3 in (1.91 m)
- Listed weight: 195 lb (88 kg)

Career information
- High school: Servite (Anaheim, California)
- College: Washington (2017–2020)
- NFL draft: 2021: 5th round, 166th overall pick

Career history
- Carolina Panthers (2021–2022); Kansas City Chiefs (2023–2024); Atlanta Falcons (2025)*; Jacksonville Jaguars (2025)
- * Offseason or practice squad member only

Awards and highlights
- Super Bowl champion (LVIII)

Career NFL statistics as of 2025
- Total tackles: 78
- Forced fumbles: 1
- Fumble recoveries: 2
- Pass deflections: 6
- Stats at Pro Football Reference

Keith Taylor (born November 20, 1998) is an American professional football cornerback. He played college football for the Washington Huskies.

== Early life ==
Taylor grew up in Long Beach, California, and initially attended St. John Bosco High School before transferring to Servite High School after his sophomore year. He was named first-team All-Trinity League and second-team All-Orange County by the Orange County Register.

== College career ==
Taylor appeared in 12 games as a true freshman, playing on special teams and as a reserve defensive back. He started two games as a sophomore. He started all 13 of Washington's games as a junior and finished the year with 59 tackles with two tackles for loss and five passes broken up. Taylor started all four of the Huskies games in the 2020 season, which was abbreviated due to COVID-19.

== Professional career ==
Pre-draft measurables
Height	Weight	Arm length	Hand span	40-yard dash	10-yard split	20-yard split	20-yard shuttle	Three-cone drill	Vertical jump	Broad jump	Bench press
6 ft 2 1/4 in (1.89 m)	187 lb (85 kg)	31 1/8 in (0.79 m)	9 1/2 in (0.24 m)	4.53 s	1.58 s	2.64 s	4.27 s	6.85 s	33.5 in (0.85 m)	10 ft 7 in (3.23 m)	12 reps
All values from Pro Day

=== Carolina Panthers ===
Taylor was selected by the Carolina Panthers in the fifth round, 166th overall, of the 2021 NFL draft. He signed his four-year rookie contract on May 13, 2021.

On August 29, 2023, Taylor was waived by the Panthers.

=== Kansas City Chiefs ===
On August 31, 2023, Taylor was signed to the practice squad of the Kansas City Chiefs practice squad. Taylor became a Super Bowl champion when the Chiefs defeated the San Francisco 49ers in Super Bowl LVIII. Taylor signed a reserve/futures contract with Kansas City on February 14, 2024.

Taylor was waived by the Chiefs on August 27, 2024, and re-signed to the practice squad. He was promoted to the active roster on October 22.

=== Atlanta Falcons ===
On March 14, 2025, Taylor signed with the Atlanta Falcons. He was released on August 26 as part of final roster cuts, and re-signed to the practice squad on September 16.

=== Jacksonville Jaguars ===
On December 25, 2025, Taylor was signed by the Jacksonville Jaguars off of the Falcons practice squad.

On February 20, 2026, Taylor re-signed with the Jaguars. He was placed on injured reserve on June 4 after suffering a torn pectoral in the offseason. Taylor was released with an injury settlement on June 15.
