= Mayfair High School =

California public school

Coordinates: 33.8644°N 118.1156°W

Mayfair Middle/High School

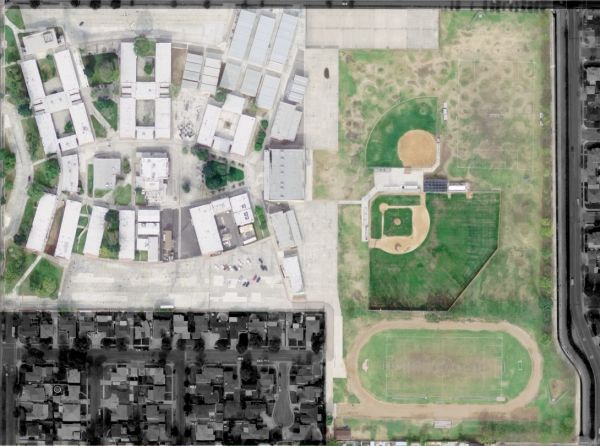

Location
- 6000 N. Woodruff Ave. Lakewood, California 90713

Information
- School type: Public high school
- Founded: 1959
- School district: Bellflower Unified School District
- Superintendent: Erin M. Simon
- Principal: Jennifer Morgan
- Teaching staff: 111.62 (on an FTE basis)
- Grades: 7–12
- Enrollment: 2,457 (2023–2024)
- Student to teacher ratio: 22.01
- Hours in school day: Mondays~5 (10:00)(3:35) Tuesday-Friday~7 (8:30)(3:35)
- Colors: White; Blue; Grey
- Mascot: Monsoons
- Rivals: Bellflower High School
- Accreditation: Western Association of Schools and Colleges (WASC)
- National ranking: 2,734
- Newspaper: The Windjammer
- Yearbook: Tradewinds
- Communities served: Lakewood, Bellflower, Cerritos
- Website: Mayfair High School website

Mayfair High School is a middle and high school in the Bellflower Unified School District in the city of Lakewood, California. The school first opened in 1959. The student population is approximately 2,500 in grades 7 through 12. Mayfair serves students in the cities of Lakewood, Bellflower, Cerritos, as well as other surrounding cities, though the students not from Cerritos, Bellflower, or Lakewood usually need special waivers to attend.

== School info ==
The school mascot is the "Monsoons" and the logo is a vortex. School colors are white, blue, and grey. The school newspaper is called The Windjammer and the yearbook Tradewinds.

=== Demographics ===
The student population racial makeup in 2022–23 was 57.0% Hispanic, 15.9% Black, 11.4% White, 11.4% Asian, 1.0% Native Hawaiian or Pacific Islander, 0.2% American Indian or Alaskan Native, and 3.0% Two or more races. The student population is approximately 2600 in grades 7 through 12. Mayfair serves students in the cities of Lakewood, Bellflower, and Cerritos.

== Athletics ==
Mayfair High School athletic teams participate in the Southern Section of CIF in the Suburban League with La Mirada, Norwalk, and Bellflower. The Monsoon athletic teams continue to be seen as dominant force within the Suburban League.

== Notable alumni ==
- Charles L. Beck (1971) – former Chief of the Los Angeles Police Department (LAPD).
- Geri Reischl (1978) – singer and actor best known for playing Jan Brady on The Brady Bunch Hour.
- Donna Turnbow (1979) – U.S. Women's Gymnastics All-Around Champion (1977).
- Jay Gibbons (1995) – Major League Baseball outfielder.
- Synyster Gates (1999) – lead guitarist of Avenged Sevenfold.
- Michael Bragg (1999) – defensive back in the NFL and CPIFL, played CFB for Texas A&M University–Kingsville
- Josh Childress (2001) – former NBA (NBA) basketball player for the Phoenix Suns. At Mayfair, Childress was selected as a McDonald's High School All-American.
- Justin Turner (2002) – former infielder for the Los Angeles Dodgers and a NL All-Star, currently playing for the Toronto Blue Jays as a designated hitter.
- Marque Richardson (2003) – USC alumni and an American actor/screenwriter.
- Alterraun Verner (2006) – NFL cornerback
- Fou Fonoti – American football player
- Patrick Christopher – NBA
- Keenon Daequan Ray Jackson (2008) – rapper known as YG
- Kyle Richardson (2009) – basketball player
- Vince Staples – rapper
- Corey Bojorquez – punter for the Cleveland Browns
- Josh Christopher (2020)] – basketball player in the Israeli Basketball Premier League, formerly in the NBA
