= John Frongillo =

American football player (born 1939)

- Frongillo with the Baylor Bears, c. 1961

No. 55
- Positions: Center, guard

Personal information
- Born: October 12, 1939 (age 87); Mansfield, Massachusetts, U.S.
- Listed height: 6 ft 3 in (1.91 m)
- Listed weight: 255 lb (116 kg)

Career information
- High school: Bellflower (Bellflower, California)
- College: Baylor
- NFL draft: 1961: 8th round, 111th overall pick
- AFL draft: 1961: 28th round, 223rd overall pick

Career history
- Houston Oilers (1962–1966)

Career AFL statistics
- Games played: 54
- Starts: 14
- Stats at Pro Football Reference

John Richard Frongillo (Pronounced: FRAHN-jill-oh) (born October 12, 1939) is an American former professional football player who was a center and guard for the Houston Oilers of the American Football League (AFL) from 1962 to 1966. He played college football for the Baylor Bears.
