= Bobby Lane =

American football player (born 1939)

- Lane with the Baylor Bears, c. 1961

No. 57
- Position: Linebacker

Personal information
- Born: October 30, 1939 (age 87); Wagoner, Oklahoma, U.S.
- Listed height: 6 ft 2 in (1.88 m)
- Listed weight: 222 lb (101 kg)

Career information
- High school: Bellflower (Bellflower, California)
- College: Cerritos (1958-1959); Baylor (1960-1961)
- NFL draft: 1961: 11th round, 144th overall pick
- AFL draft: 1961: 20th round, 158th overall pick

Career history
- Dallas Texans (1962)*; San Diego Chargers (1963–1964)
- * Offseason or practice squad member only

Awards and highlights
- AFL champion (1963)

Career AFL statistics
- Sacks: 1
- Stats at Pro Football Reference

Bobby Allen Lane (born October 30, 1939) is an American former professional football player who was a linebacker for two seasons with the San Diego Chargers of the American Football League (AFL). He was selected by the Dallas Texans in the 20th round of the 1961 AFL draft. Lane played college football at Cerritos College and Baylor University.

== Early life ==
Bobby Allen Lane was born on October 30, 1939, in Wagoner, Oklahoma. He attended Bellflower High School in Bellflower, California.

== College career ==
Lane first played college football at Cerritos College from 1958 to 1959. He was then a two-year letterman for the Baylor Bears from 1960 to 1961. He caught 18 passes for 248 yards and one touchdown in 1960 and 13 catches for 141 yards and three touchdowns.

== Professional career ==
Lane was selected by the Los Angeles Rams in the 11th round, with the 144th overall pick, of the 1961 NFL draft, and by the Dallas Texans in the 20th round, with the 158th overall pick, of the 1961 AFL draft. He signed with the Texans in 1962 but was released later that year on August 28, 1962.

Lane signed with the San Diego Chargers of the AFL in 1963. He played in seven games, starting one, for the Chargers during the 1963 season and recorded one sack. He also played in the 1963 AFL Championship Game, a 51–10 victory over the Boston Patriots. Lane appeared in one game for the Chargers in 1964. He was released in 1965.
