= Bellflower Unified School District =

School district in California, United States

Location
- Bellflower, California

District information
- Type: Public
- Grades: Pre K-12th
- Schools: 15

Other information
- Website: www.busd.k12.ca.us

The Bellflower Unified School District (BUSD) is a school district in Los Angeles County, California. It serves the city of Bellflower as well as portions of Cerritos and Lakewood.

== List of schools ==
=== Middle/High schools ===
- Bellflower High School
- Mayfair High School
- Somerset High School

=== Elementary schools ===
- Albert Baxter Elementary School
- Stephen Foster Elementary School
- Intensive Learning Center
- Thomas Jefferson Elementary School
- Las Flores Home Education Independent Study Academy
- Esther Lindstrom Elementary School
- Ernie Pyle Elementary School
- Ramona Elementary School
- Washington Elementary School
- Craig Williams Elementary School
- Frank E. Woodruff Elementary School

== Adult Schools ==
- Bellflower Adult School

== See also ==
- List of school districts in Los Angeles County, California
