= Somerset High School (Bellflower, California) =

Public High School in Bellflower, California

Location
- 9242 E. Laurel Street; Bellflower, California 90706; United States; 33°52′56″N 118°08′12″W

Information
- Other name: Somerset Continuation High School
- School district: Bellflower Unified School District
- NCES School ID: 060444000408
- Principal: Cliff Higgins
- Grades: 9–12
- Enrollment: 113 (2022-2023)
- Website: somersetsaints.org

Somerset High School is a continuation school located in Bellflower, California, as part of the Bellflower Unified School District (BUSD).

As of 2004, Somerset had 17 regular educations teachers and 16 classrooms serving 353 students from the communities of Lakewood and Bellflower. Average class size is 12.7 students.

== Demographics ==
Student population racial makeup (2010)
Race	Percentage of population
African-American	12.7
American Indian or Alaska Native	0.52
Asian	1.04
Filipino	1.56
Hispanic or Latino	62.97
Pacific Islander	2.34
White (Not Hispanic)	13.31
Multiple or No Response	5.48

California Standardized Testing Rankings for 2010 Data reported are the percent of students achieving at the Proficient or Advanced level (meeting or exceeding the state standards).
Subject	School	District	State
English-Language Arts	5	50	52
Mathematics	0	47	48
Science	5	56	54
History-Social Science	4	43	44

== Special Services ==
This school serves students that were referred from the other high schools in the district. Special services on this campus are a regional occupation program center and a child care facility for children of teen mothers.
