= Servite High School =

Location
- 1952 West La Palma Avenue; Anaheim, Orange County, California 92801; United States
- Coordinates: 33°50′47″N 117°56′58″W

Information
- Type: Private, All-Boys
- Motto: Latin: Credo ut Intelligam English: I believe so I may understand
- Religious affiliations: Roman Catholic, Servites Order (OSM)
- Established: 1958
- CEEB code: 050-088
- President: Stephen Walswick
- Principal: Nancy Windisch
- Grades: 9–12
- Gender: Boys
- Enrollment: 751 (2023–2024)
- Average class size: 21
- Student to teacher ratio: 16:1
- Campus size: 15-acre (61,000 m^{2})
- Campus type: Suburban
- Colors: Black, white and gold
- Song: Salve Regina
- Athletics conference: CIF Southern Section; Trinity League
- Mascot: Friar
- Team name: Friars
- Rival: Mater Dei
- Accreditation: Western Association of Schools and Colleges
- Newspaper: The Spokesman
- Yearbook: The Story
- Tuition: $20,945 (2025–26)
- Website: www.servitehs.org

Servite High School is a private, Catholic, all-boys college preparatory high school in Anaheim, California founded in 1958.

As of 2023, it enrolled 751 students and had nearly 10,000 alumni. While located within the Diocese of Orange, it is not a diocesan school; it is operated independently by the Order of Servants of Mary (OSM), also known as the Servite Order, after whom the school is named.

The schools is accredited by the Western Association of Schools and Colleges (WASC) and by the Western Catholic Educational Association (WCEA). In prep sports, it competes in the Trinity League of the California Interscholastic Federation Southern Section (CIF SS). Its mascot is the Friar and its colors are black and white, trimmed with gold.

== Academics ==
Servite's curriculum is designed so that its graduates meet entrance requirements for the University of California or California State University systems. The core curriculum including classes in English, fine arts, world languages, health and physical education, mathematics, theology, science, and social studies. Courses are designated as "College Preparatory," "Honors Placement," or "Advanced Placement" depending on their level of intellectual intensity.

The school's educational philosophy reflects the Catholic concept of formation, i.e. discovering and becoming the person God has intended one to be. The school motto Credo ut Intelligam ("I believe so I may understand") illustrates the emphasis the school places on developing leaders who are faith-filled men of God.

Since 2007, the student body has been grouped into eight student-led communities called "Priories," named after St. Philip Benizi and each of the Seven Holy Founders, and 48 smaller student-led homeroom communities. Each week, a block period is dedicated to student-led leadership activities. Additionally, students must perform 100 hours of "Christian service" over four years in order to graduate.

== History ==
In 1957, the Roman Catholic Archdiocese of Los Angeles invited the Servites to open a school. The school opened the following fall under principal Fr. Maurice Gillespie, OSM, who had previously served at St. Philip Basilica High School (closed 1970) in Chicago. As the academic buildings were not yet completed, some classes were taught at nearby St. Philip Benizi Elementary School, also operated by the Servites. The priory also being under construction, the priests lived on the second floor of the main building. The main building was officially dedicated by Cardinal McIntyre on February 12, 1959, the feast day of the Seven Holy Founders of the Servite Order.

From early on the school developed a strong athletic tradition. Its inaugural football team, fielded in 1960 and consisting of all sophomores and juniors, was CIF Southern Section co-champion in the Small Schools division. Head football coach George Dena created Servite's Hut Drill in 1961, a choreographed formation drill performed at the start and end of every football game, and one of the school's most noted football traditions. The same year, Servite joined the newly formed Angelus League with other Catholic schools in Los Angeles and Orange Counties; Mater Dei in Santa Ana would become its principal football rival.

Major campus expansions include a gym and aquatics facilities (in 1967), theater (1977), new classrooms (1984), and new science and library facility (1998). Servite's wrestling room was also a recent addition to the school on the campus' priory lawn (2006). In 2016 and 2017, the school constructed a new baseball complex, practice fields, weight pavilion, and new aquatics complex.

In 2017, the new $5.7 million aquatics facility opened and was dedicated to Fr. Kevin Fitzpatrick, who had worked at the school from 1970 to 1992 as swim and water polo coach as well as an algebra and religion teacher. After the passage of California AB 218, which gave a three-year window to file allegations of child sexual abuse beyond the statute of limitations, a former student brought suit in 2022 against the school claiming Fitzpatrick had abused him repeatedly. Lawsuits from other former students followed, and in July 2022 the school removed his name from the aquatics center.

== Admissions ==
Admission to Servite is based on academic aptitude and leadership potential as assessed through 7th and 8th grade academic transcripts, standardized test and entrance exam scores, separate parent and student interviews, and letters of recommendation.

Base tuition for the 2023–24 school year of $19,995 could be offset by discounts. Servite also offers need-based financial aid and merit scholarships; over half of students receive financial aid in some form.

== Sister schools ==
Servite's sister school is Rosary Academy, Fullerton, an all-girls Catholic institution. It also had a similar relationship with Cornelia Connelly High School in Anaheim before it closed in 2020.

Servite also has exchange programs with Servite schools around the world including Collège Notre-Dame des Servites (Ayer's Cliff, Quebec), Servite College (Perth, Western Australia), Blanche de Castille (Villemomble, France), Marian High School (Omaha, Nebraska), San Pelligrino (Misano, Italy), and Mary Star of the Sea (Zululand, South Africa).

== Athletics ==
Servite currently competes in the Trinity League in 13 CIF sports:

- Fall: cross country, football, water polo
- Winter: basketball, soccer, wrestling
- Spring: baseball, golf, lacrosse, swim, tennis, track & field, volleyball

Additionally, ice hockey and rugby are offered on a non-CIF, club sport basis, and all athletes are supported by sports medicine and strength and conditioning staff.

Servite's historic football rival is Mater Dei High School in Santa Ana, having played every year since 1961. In 2018, MaxPreps rated it the 22nd greatest high school rivalry in the United States, and "the best rivalry in the toughest league in the nation." In some years, there has been enough interest in the football game for it to be played at Angel Stadium.

=== State championships ===
- Football: 1982, 2009, 2023
- Track & Field: 2025
- Basketball: 1990
- Golf: 2011
- Cross Country: 2004
- Soccer: 2015, 2020, 2022, 2024

== Notable alumni ==
- Michael Bandy (2016), NFL wide receiver for the Denver Broncos
- Steve Beuerlein (1983), Notre Dame and NFL quarterback
- Derek Brown (1989), NFL running back
- Steve Buechele (1979), MLB third baseman
- Patrick Cantlay (2010), professional golfer
- Dale A. Drozd (1973), United States district judge of the United States District Court for the Eastern District of California and former chief United States magistrate judge of the same court.
- Sean Estrada (2003), University of Pennsylvania and San Francisco 49ers offensive lineman, NFL Attorney for Labor Relations
- Cody Fajardo (2010), quarterback for University of Nevada and CFL's Edmonton Elks
- Noah Fifita (2022), quarterback for the University of Arizona
- Ben Francisco (1999), former MLB outfielder for Philadelphia Phillies, Cleveland Indians
- Chris Galippo (2007), middle linebacker at USC and US Army Bowl MVP
- Ryan Garko (1999), MLB first baseman for Seattle Mariners, college baseball coach
- A. J. Gass (1993), former CFL football player
- Mason Graham (2022), Defensive tackle for the Cleveland Browns
- Dennis Sean Houlton (1997), Major League Baseball pitcher
- Cole Irvin (2012), former MLB pitcher for the Oakland Athletics, KBO pitcher for the Doosan Bears
- Travis Jonsen (2015), former NFL wide receiver
- Andy Jurgensen (2000), film editor
- Frank Kalil (1977), NFL and USFL center
- Ryan Kalil (2003), offensive lineman at USC, center for Carolina Panthers, author, filmmaker
- Matt Kalil (2008), former offensive tackle for USC and Carolina Panthers
- Craig A. Kelly (1972), former Ambassador of the United States to Chile
- Keiro Kitagami (1985) Japanese politician, a member of the House of Representatives in the Diet (national legislature).
- Brian Lee (1989), entrepreneur, founder LegalZoom.com, Shoedazzle.com and The Honest Company
- Rex Lee (1987), actor, Entourage
- Bruce Marchiano (1973), actor, filmmaker, and attorney
- Jacob Manu (2022), linebacker for the University of Washington
- James D. McCaffrey (1970), software research and author
- Mike McDonald (1983), comedian, actor
- John McEntee (2008), former political advisor
- Tetairoa McMillan (2022), wide receiver for the Carolina Panthers
- Richard McWilliam (1971), founder of Upper Deck Company
- Matt Moran (1980), NFL offensive tackle and high school football coach
- Troy Niklas (2011), former tight end for Notre Dame and NFL's Arizona Cardinals
- Father Brian Nunes (1978), Auxiliary Bishop-Elect of the Archdiocese of Los Angeles
- Blaine Nye (1964), former NFL offensive lineman, and economics consultant
- Chris Pontius (2005), former soccer player, D.C. United midfielder
- Michael A. Rice (1973), university professor and Rhode Island state representative
- Mike Robertson (1987), former MLB first baseman and left fielder
- Marc Rzepczynski (2003), former Major League Baseball pitcher for Seattle Mariners
- Vincent Bevins (2002), journalist for Washington Post, LA Times and Financial Times
- Joseph Sanberg (1997), founder CalEITC4Me and co-founder, Aspiration.com
- Turk Schonert (1975), Stanford and NFL quarterback, former Buffalo Bills offensive coordinator
- Matt Slater (2003), former captain and wide receiver for New England Patriots
- Equanimeous St. Brown (2015), former NFL wide receiver
- Keith Taylor (2017), NFL cornerback for the Atlanta Falcons
- Kurt Vollers (1997), former NFL tackle
- Patrick Warburton, (1982) actor (did not graduate; transferred out)
- Ed Whelan, (1978), American lawyer, legal activist, and political commentator.
- Matt Willis (2002), former wide receiver for UCLA and Denver Broncos
- Mike Witt (1978), MLB pitcher, pitched perfect game on September 30, 1984 for California Angels
