= Michael Bragg =

American football player (born 1981)

No. 3
- Position: Defensive back

Personal information
- Born: December 13, 1981 (age 44); Los Angeles, California, U.S.
- Listed height: 6 ft 1 in (1.85 m)
- Listed weight: 195 lb (88 kg)

Career information
- High school: Mayfair (Lakewood, California)
- College: Texas A&M-Kingsville
- NFL draft: 2005: undrafted

Career history
- New York Giants (2005)*; Kansas City Chiefs (2006); Colorado Crush (2008); Cleveland Gladiators (2010–2011); Laredo Rattlesnakes (2013); Dodge City Law (2014)
- * Offseason or practice squad member only

Awards and highlights
- First Team All-LSC (2004)

Career NFL statistics
- Tackles: 1
- Stats at Pro Football Reference

Career AFL statistics
- Tackles: 92
- Pass breakups: 13
- Interceptions: 8
- Stats at ArenaFan.com

Michael Dwayne Bragg (born December 13, 1981) is an American football defensive back. In 2006, he played in the National Football League with the Kansas City Chiefs at cornerback. Bragg played college football for Texas A&M University–Kingsville.

== Early life ==
Bragg was born in Los Angeles, California and graduated as a prep standout at Mayfair High School in Lakewood, California.

== College career ==
The California native was a three time All-American selection in the "Long Jump" after beginning his collegiate career at Cerritos College. Upon graduation from Cerritos, Bragg attended Texas A&M University–Kingsville where he completed his collegiate career with 36 tackles, 4 interceptions, 2 fumble recoveries, and 10 passes defended. He earned his first-team All-Lone Star Conference South Division honors as a senior. That year, he recorded 25 tackles, 3 interceptions, 1 fumble recovery and 9 passes were defended that year.

== Professional career ==
In 2005, Bragg entered the NFL as an undrafted free agent with the New York Giants. Following the Giants, Bragg spent the first four games of the 2006 season on the Kansas City Chiefs practice squad after originally signing with the club on February 21, 2006. He was promoted to the active 53 man roster and saw action in a game and also retained an injury.

In 2008, Bragg joined the Arena Football League with his first-team being the now non-existent team the Colorado Crush. After the league resumed, in 2010 Mike was signed to the Cleveland Gladiators as their starting Jack Linebacker.
