= Avery Williams (running back) =

American football player (born 1998)

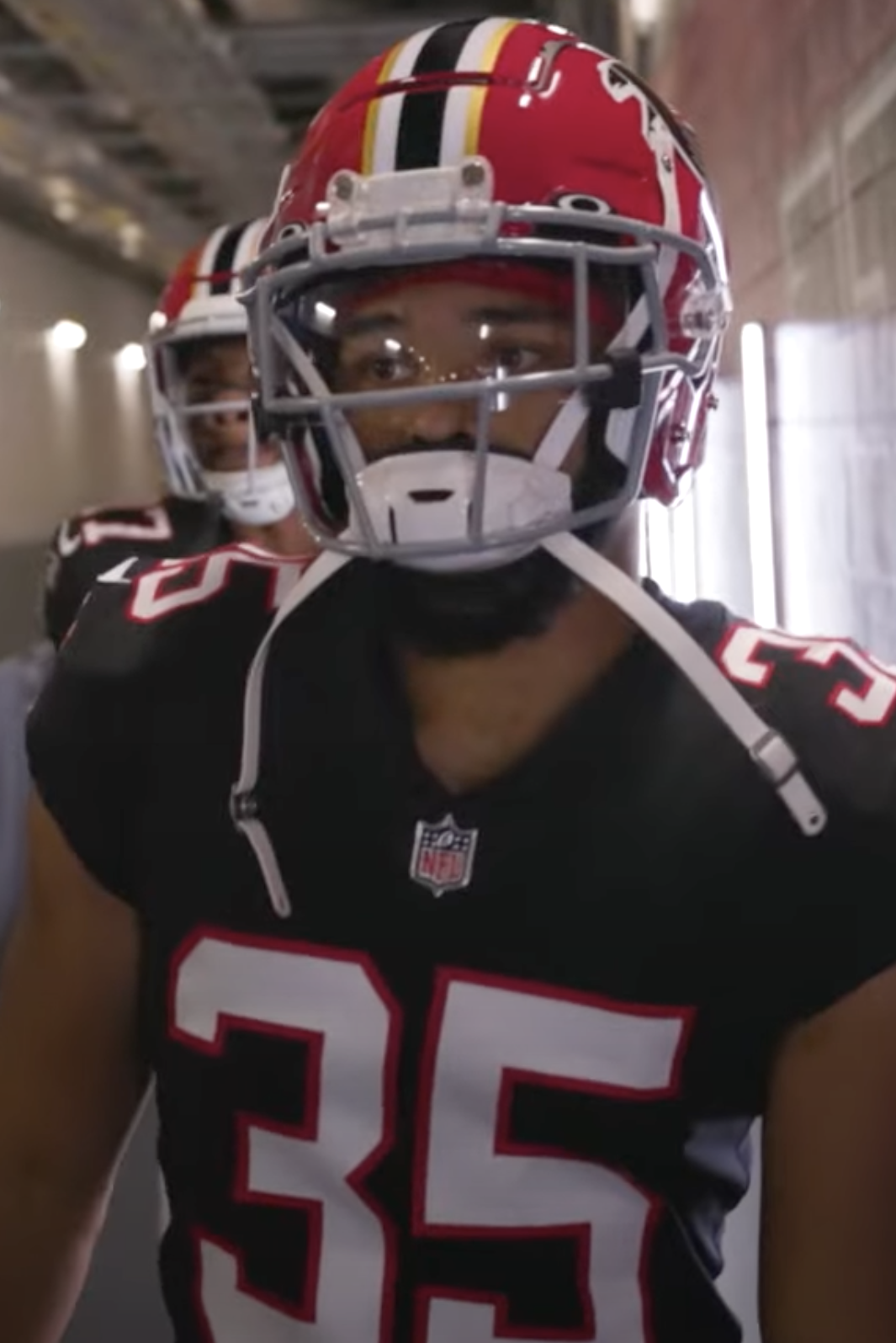
- Williams with the Atlanta Falcons in 2022

Profile
- Positions: Running back, return specialist

Personal information
- Born: July 15, 1998 (age 28); Pasadena, California, U.S.
- Listed height: 5 ft 9 in (1.75 m)
- Listed weight: 195 lb (88 kg)

Career information
- High school: JSerra Catholic (San Juan Capistrano, California)
- College: Boise State (2016–2020)
- NFL draft: 2021: 5th round, 183rd overall pick

Career history
- Atlanta Falcons (2021–2024); Philadelphia Eagles (2025)*; New York Jets (2025)
- * Offseason or practice squad member only

Awards and highlights
- Jet Award (2020); 2× MW Special Teams Player of the Year (2019, 2020); Consensus All-American (2020); First-team All-MW (2020); Second-team All-MW (2017)

Career NFL statistics
- Rushing yards: 109
- Rushing average: 5
- Receptions: 13
- Receiving yards: 61
- Return yards: 1,841
- Total touchdowns: 1
- Stats at Pro Football Reference

Avery Williams (born July 15, 1998) is an American professional football running back and return specialist. He played college football for the Boise State Broncos.

== Early life ==
Williams was born to Pam Veasey and Marvin Williams on July 15, 1998. He is of Mexican descent through a grandmother. He grew up in Pasadena, California and originally attended Saint Francis High School before transferring to JSerra Catholic High School before his senior year. As a senior, Williams was named Trinity League co-Most Valuable Player after rushing for 1,175 yards and 14 touchdowns on offense at running back and was also an All-Area selection at defensive back. He received no scholarship offers to play college football and enrolled at Boise State after being offered to join the team as a preferred walk-on.

== College career ==
Williams joined Boise State's football team as a walk-on and redshirted his true freshman season. He was named the Special Teams Scout Team Player of the Year during his redshirt year and awarded a scholarship during fall preseason training camp in 2017. Williams became the team's punt and kick returner as well as a starter at cornerback during his redshirt freshman season and finished the season with two interceptions and eight passes broken up and also returned two punts for touchdowns and was named second-team All-Mountain West Conference.

As a redshirt sophomore, Williams recorded 49 tackles with 11 passes defended, two interceptions and three forced fumbles and returned a kickoff for a touchdown and was named honorable mention All-Mountain West. He was again named honorable mention All-Mountain West after recording 39 tackles with four passes broken up and returning 22 punts for 290 yards and two touchdowns in his junior season. As a senior, Williams returned 19 kickoffs for 533 yards and two touchdowns and 15 punts for 229 yards and two touchdowns, tying the NCAA Division I career record with nine return touchdowns. He was named first-team All-Mountain West and the Conference Special Teams Player of the Year as a returner and was a consensus first-team All-American selection as an all-purpose player.

== Professional career ==
Pre-draft measurables
Height	Weight	Arm length	Hand span	40-yard dash	10-yard split	20-yard split	20-yard shuttle	Three-cone drill	Vertical jump	Broad jump	Bench press
5 ft 8 3/8 in (1.74 m)	187 lb (85 kg)	28 3/4 in (0.73 m)	9 in (0.23 m)	4.43 s	1.55 s	2.57 s	4.00 s	6.88 s	33.5 in (0.85 m)	10 ft 1 in (3.07 m)	19 reps
All values from Pro Day

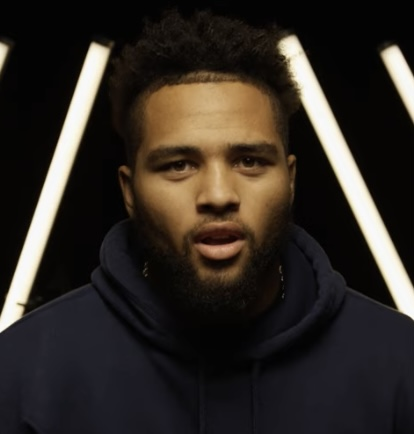
Williams in 2021

=== Atlanta Falcons ===
Williams was selected by the Atlanta Falcons in the fifth round (183rd overall) of the 2021 NFL draft. He signed his four-year rookie contract with Atlanta on June 15, 2021. He was the Falcons primary kick and punt returner as well as a core special teamer and gunner in 2021.

In the 2022 offseason, the Falcons moved Williams to running back, going back to his primary position in high school.

On June 7, 2023, head coach Arthur Smith announced that Williams tore his ACL while participating in the Falcons' organized team activities (OTAs) and would miss the entire season. He was placed on injured reserve on June 16.

=== Philadelphia Eagles ===
On March 15, 2025, Williams signed a one-year contract with the Philadelphia Eagles. He was released on August 26 as part of final roster cuts.

=== New York Jets ===
On October 3, 2025, Williams signed with the New York Jets' practice squad. He was released on October 14.
