= Taco Nazo =

American Mexican restaurant chain

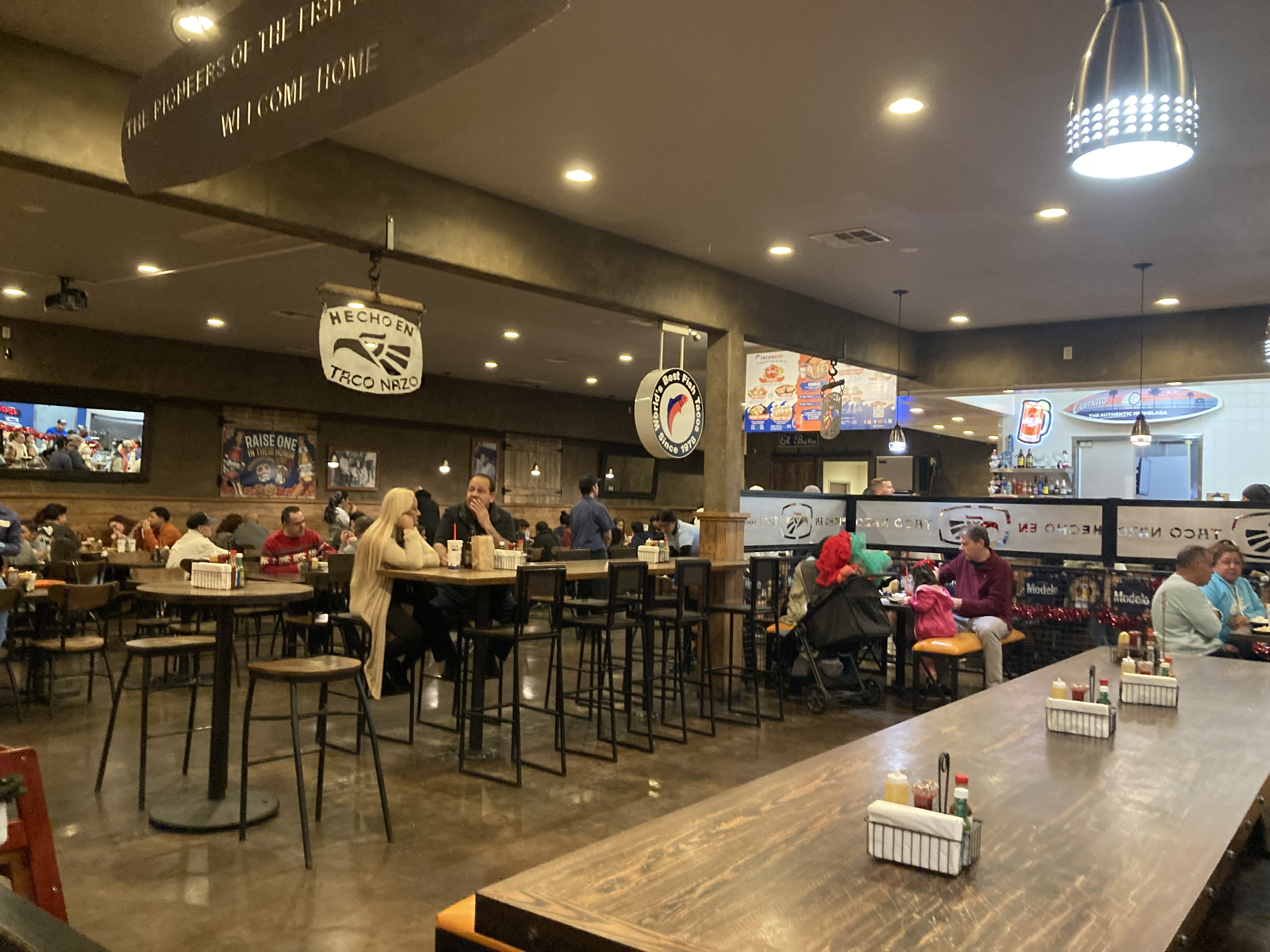
- Interior of the Bellflower, California location
- Company type: Private
- Industry: Foodservice
- Founded: 1978
- Founder: Gilberto Romero; Maria Romero
- Number of locations: 5 (2025)
- Area served: Southern California
- Website: taconazo.com

Taco Nazo is an American chain of Mexican restaurants based in Southern California. Founded in 1978, it has five locations and is known for its fish tacos, claiming it is the pioneer of the Baja-style of preparing them. The chain is also known for popularizing fish tacos in Southern California.

== History ==
The chain was founded by Gilberto and Maria Romero, who had moved to Los Angeles from Ensenada. The chain's first location, in La Puente, was originally a taco truck. In 2013, the chain appeared on noted food critic Jonathan Gold's top Baja-style tacos in Los Angeles.

== Menu ==
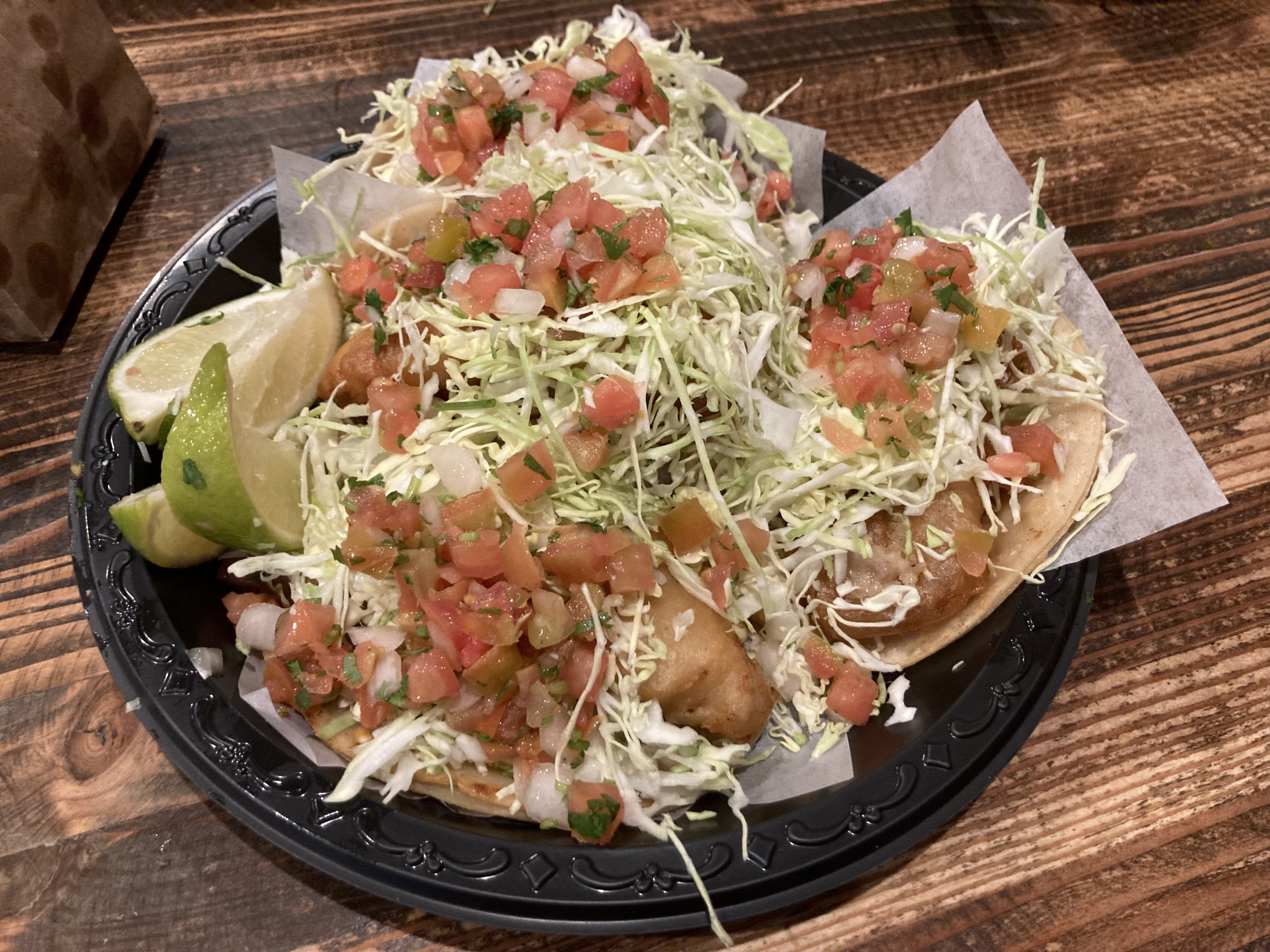
Fish tacos

The restaurant mainly offers fish tacos with a multitude of fillings, with different types of fish and meat available. They are of the Baja style; the chain claims it is the style's pioneer. Fish burritos and ceviches are also sold. Tortas, bowls, nachos, quesadillas, and tostadas are the other main options. Sides include refried beans, salsa, guacamole, cheese, and shrimp. Catering is offered.

== Locations ==
Taco Nazo has five locations, all in Southern California. They are in Bellflower, La Puente, South El Monte, La Habra, Walnut, and Santa Ana. Catering is also offered.
