= Bellflower High School =

Location
- 15301 McNab Avenue; Bellflower, California, 90706
- Coordinates: 33°53′34.62″N 118°6′53.46″W

Information
- Type: Public high school
- Established: 1951
- School district: Bellflower Unified School District
- Principal: Jessica Cummings
- Staff: 101.49 (FTE)
- Grades: 7–12
- Enrollment: 2,062 (2023–2024)
- Student to teacher ratio: 20.32
- Colors: Maroon; Gold
- Team name: Buccaneers
- Rival: Mayfair High School
- Website: https://bellflowerhigh.org/

Bellflower High School is a six-year public high school located in Bellflower, California, as part of the Bellflower Unified School District (BUSD).

== Demographics and class size ==
As of 2023, Bellflower High School serves 2,070 students from the communities of Lakewood, Bellflower, Downey, and Cerritos. Average class size is around 20 students.

Student population racial makeup (2010)
Race	Percentage of Enrollment
Black	10.70%
American Indian or Alaska Native	0.40%
Asian	2.30%
Filipino	3.10%
Hispanic/Latino	78.10%
Pacific Islander	0.50%
White (Not Hispanic)	3.30%
Multiple	1.20%

== Activities ==
The school mascot is the "Buccaneer"—illustrated as a pirate with an eyepatch. The school colors are maroon and gold.

The school produced digital format of yearbooks from 1951 to 2001 on Yearbook CDs.

== Notable alumni ==
- Dick Ackerman (born 1942), California State Senate Republican Leader
- Mike Benjamin (born 1965), former MLB player (San Francisco Giants, Philadelphia Phillies, Boston Red Sox, Pittsburgh Pirates)
- Chris Carter (born 1956), television screenwriter and producer. Creator of The X-Files
- Ed Dickson (born 1987), National Football League tight end, Super Bowl XLVII champion
- John Frongillo (born 1958), National Football League center and guard
- Anthony Gose (born 1990), MLB player (Toronto Blue Jays, Detroit Tigers, Cleveland Guardians)
- John Gesek (born 1963), National Football League offensive lineman, two-time Super Bowl champion, he transferred after his junior year.
- Daniel J. Kim (born 1976), CEO of frozen yogurt chain Red Mango
- Bobby Lane (born 1939), National Football League linebacker, 1963 AFL champion
- Bob Lee (born 1937), Major League Baseball player
- Eric Plunk, former MLB player (Oakland Athletics, New York Yankees, Cleveland Indians, Milwaukee Brewers)
- Billy Rohr (born 1945), Major League Baseball pitcher for Boston Red Sox and Cleveland Indians
- Ron Yary (born 1946), first selection of 1968 NFL/AFL draft, member of College and Pro Football Hall of Fames
