= JSerra Catholic High School =

Location
- 26351 Junipero Serra Road; San Juan Capistrano, California 92675; United States; 33.5211°N 117.6682°W

Information
- School type: Private High School
- Motto: Siempre Adelante (Always Forward)
- Religious affiliation: Roman Catholic
- Patron saint: St. Junipero Serra
- Established: 2003
- President: Richard T. Meyer
- Principal: Eric Stroupe
- Grades: 9-12
- Enrollment: 1300
- Colors: Crimson, black, and gold
- Athletics conference: CIF Southern Section; Trinity League
- Mascot: Lion
- Website: www.jserra.org

JSerra Catholic High School is a private coeducational Catholic high school located in San Juan Capistrano, California. Named after Saint Junípero Serra, the school was founded by parents in 2003 and is an independent school sanctioned by the Diocese of Orange.

The school is accredited by the Western Association of Schools and Colleges. In 2006, 2007, and 2008, the school was named one of the top 50 Catholic high schools in the United States by the Catholic High School Honor Roll of the Cardinal Newman Society.

== History ==
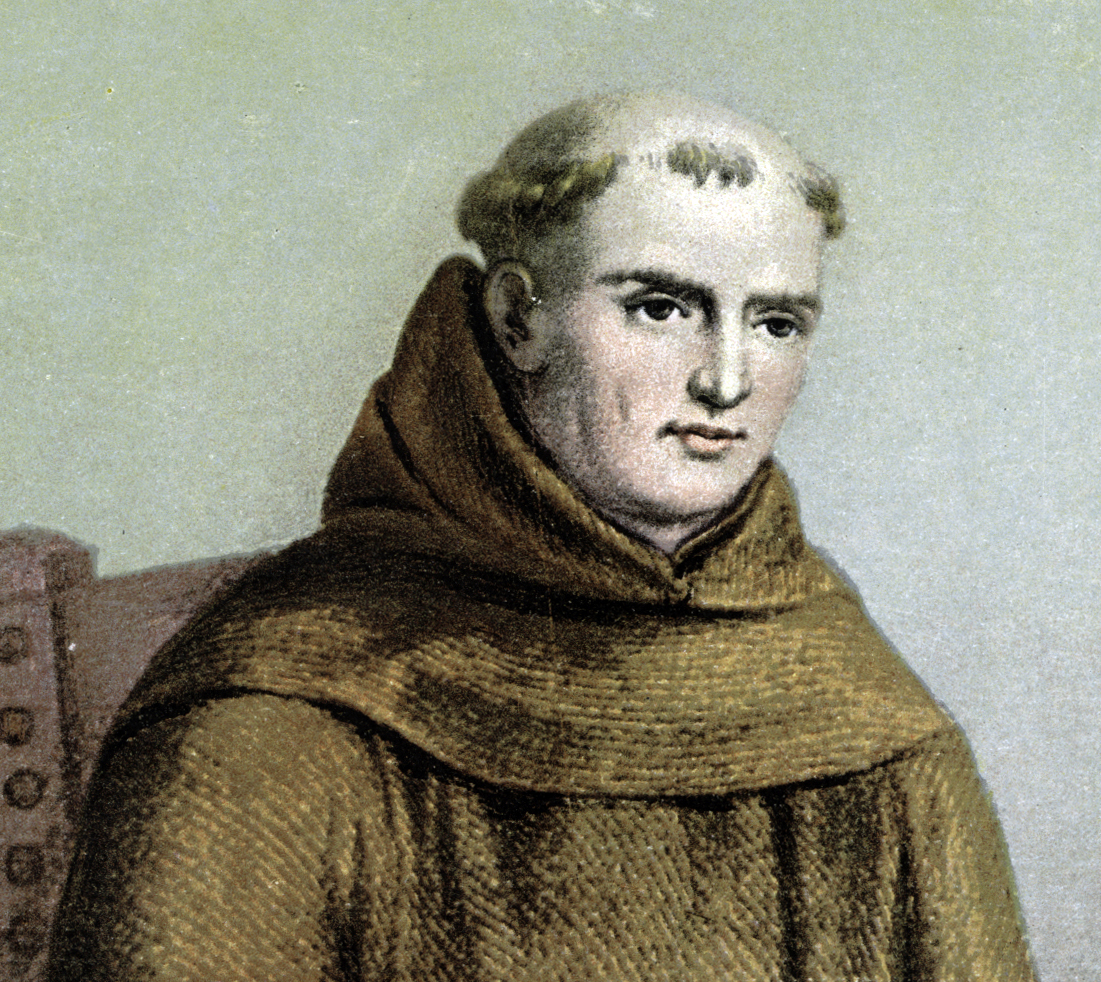
The school is named after Californian missionary Saint Junípero Serra.

Planning for a new Catholic high school to serve South Orange County began in 1998. Unlike most Catholic schools, which are established by dioceses or religious institutes, the effort was spearheaded by Catholic laity led by Marc Spizziri, a local car dealer, and Timothy Busch, a tax attorney. The original plan had been to build on 35 acres of land owned by Rancho Capistrano Ministries, founded by Robert A. Schuller and run by Crystal Cathedral Ministries, which had been donated by businessman John Crean. Negotiations failed, however, as Rancho Capistrano wanted to participate in teaching, but the high school would have excluded non-Catholic instructors from teaching religion.

They acquired a different parcel nearby, close to Interstate 5, where the current campus is located. The planned athletics fields, aquatics facilities, and performing arts center garnered stiff opposition from members of the Juaneño Band of Mission Indians, an organization that self-identifies as a Juaneño tribe. The land was the site of the former village of Putiidhem. Patricia Martz, a professor at California State University, Los Angeles who joined the opposition, estimated as many as 175 bodies could be buried there. Others, however, like local archaeologist Henry Koerper at Cypress College, cast doubt on those estimates, noting that only seven burial plots had been discovered. David Belardes, designated by the state of California to represent the Juaneño Band of Mission Indians, agreed to the plan so long as only fields, not buildings, were constructed, and that a monument be placed on the land. Other factions of the organization rejected Belardes' authority, however, and joined neighboring property owners and environmentalists in a group called Spirit of Capistrano to block the project. Adding further complications, the Capistrano Unified School District identified the site as its first choice for a new middle school, and considered using eminent domain to take possession of it.

Two lawsuits were filed, and opponents attempted to hold a public referendum on the project, though they failed to gather enough signatures. Picketers greeted students on the first day of school, September 3, 2003. Ultimately, the school district decided against the use of the property for its middle school. A last lawsuit, brought against the city of San Juan Capistrano for changing the zoning to allow the school's construction, was dismissed later in the month, and construction went forward as planned on November 18, to be completed for 2006.

== Athletics ==
JSerra competes in the Trinity League of the CIF Southern Section as the Lions. The school has sports rivalries with Santa Margarita Catholic High School and Mater Dei High School.

As of 2020, the JSerra athletic program offers soccer, volleyball, water polo, swimming, baseball and softball, golf, basketball, cross country, track and field, lacrosse, tennis, cheerleading, football, ice hockey, and rugby as well as an award-winning choral music program. The $40 million athletic complex occupies 29 acres adjacent to the academic campus and features a 2000-seat gymnasium, Olympic-class swimming pool, and various fields and courts all using artificial turf. The golf teams practice at Arroyo Trabuco Golf Club in Mission Viejo.

JSerra's athletics facility is the host of The TEN and other international Sound Running track and field meetings.

== Magnet programs ==
JSerra offers five unique magnet programs that serve as an introduction to potential careers in that field. Students can choose from Business, Engineering, Law and Medical Magnet programs. Each of the magnets offer different experiences to further the education of students.

== Controversies ==
In December 2011, Spanish teacher and girls junior varsity volleyball coach Ricardo Aldana was arrested on suspicion of a sex act involving a student under age 14. In a statement, the school said they were "outraged and sickened" by the charges; they cooperated fully with the investigation and dismissed Aldana. Aldana was subsequently convicted on three counts of sexual molestation and sentenced to three years and four months in state prison; he has been released since.

== Notable alumni ==
- General Booty - college football quarterback. Transferred after his junior year
- Ryan Campbell - Professional women's soccer player
- Izzy D'Aquila - Professional women's soccer player
- Ryder Dodd - member of the United States men's water polo team
- Julie Doyle - Professional women's soccer player
- Austin Faoliu - Professional football player. Transferred after his junior year
- Jazmin Grace Grimaldi - daughter of Albert II, Prince of Monaco
- Nick Harris - center for the Seattle Seahawks
- Austin Hedges - Major League Baseball player for the Cleveland Guardians, World Series Champion
- Gage Jump - professional baseball pitcher in the Athletics organization
- Gracie Kramer - artistic gymnast, part of the UCLA Bruins women's gymnastics team
- Royce Lewis - Minnesota Twins SS/2B/3B/OF. First overall selection in the 2017 Major League Baseball draft
- Lyle Lin - catcher in the Athletics organization
- Mason Murphy - offensive tackle for the New Orleans Saints
- Makena Sommer Partington - Business Woman and Personality, former athlete under Vladi Sapozhkov
- Dante Pettis - NFL wide receiver
- Kyler Pettis - Emmy Award-winning actor
- DJ Rodman - college basketball player for the USC Trojans
- Trinity Rodman - member of the United States women's national soccer team
- Chase Strumpf - second baseman/third baseman in the Chicago Cubs organization
- Luke Wattenberg - center for the Denver Broncos
- Davis Wendzel - third baseman for the Texas Rangers
- Avery Williams - running back for the Atlanta Falcons
