= Chris Galippo =

American football player (born 1989)

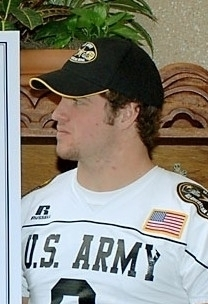
- Galippo in 2007

No. 54
- Position: Linebacker

Personal information
- Born: April 12, 1989 (age 37); Newport Beach, California, U.S.
- Listed height: 6 ft 2 in (1.88 m)
- Listed weight: 250 lb (113 kg)

Career information
- High school: Servite (Anaheim, California)
- College: Southern California
- NFL draft: 2012: undrafted

Career history
- Indianapolis Colts (2012)*
- * Offseason or practice squad member only

Awards and highlights
- Third-team All-Pac-10 (2009)

Chris Galippo (born April 12, 1989) is an American former football linebacker. He played for the University of Southern California. Galippo became the first defensive player to ever win the Pete Dawkins Trophy for being selected as the U.S. Army All-American Bowl's most valuable player. He was signed as an undrafted free agent by the Indianapolis Colts in 2012.

== Early life ==
Galippo played middle linebacker, running back and receiver at Servite High School in Anaheim, California, and was the 2005 Serra League co-defensive player of the year, as well as the Orange County Register Defensive Player of the Year. He was a 2005-2006 Unanimous Parade All-American, an ALL CIF-SS Division-1 first-team selection, and rated the #2 overall player in the United States by ESPN. Galippo finished with 161 tackles as a junior, a school record.

Alongside USC, Galippo was recruited by over 35 other top college football programs, including UCLA, Arizona State, Boston College, Notre Dame, Ohio State, Florida, and Ole Miss.

Galippo started 2007 by earning MVP honors at the nation's most recognized high school all-star game, the Army All-American Bowl. Galippo, who ended the game with more than a dozen tackles, contributed to the West team's 24-7 victory.

== College career ==
Galippo claimed that the level of engagement he received from the coaching staff was a major factor in his decision to choose USC. However his deciding factor was its location.

Chris played in the first three games of the 2007 season on special teams. He made two tackles against Washington State, four tackles against Nebraska, and two against Idaho. Galippo received a medical redshirt for the 2007 season due to a back surgery.

In October 2009, he was named a midseason All-American by The Sporting News.

== Professional career ==
On May 3, 2012, Galippo was signed by the Indianapolis Colts as an undrafted free agent. On July 10, 2012, he was waived by the Colts.

== Post-playing career ==
Chris has been a lead color analyst for the Fox Sports West Prep Zone High School football games of the week since 2012. He also appears as a guest analyst on the ABC post-game show SPORTSZONE hosted by Rob Fukuzaki.
