= Sean Estrada =

American football player (born 1985)

No. 60
- Positions: Guard, Center

Personal information
- Born: May 23, 1985 (age 41); Orange, California
- Listed height: 6 ft 4 in (1.93 m)
- Listed weight: 315 lb (143 kg)

Career information
- High school: Servite (Anaheim, California)
- College: Penn
- NFL draft: 2007: undrafted

Career history
- San Francisco 49ers (2007); San Jose SaberCats (2008); New York Sentinels (2009)

Awards and highlights
- Unanimous First-team All-Ivy League (2006); Team Captain (2006); All-Ivy League (2005)

Sean Estrada (born May 23, 1985) is an American former football guard and center who played for the San Francisco 49ers of the National Football League. He was originally signed by the 49ers as an undrafted free agent in 2007. He played college football at Pennsylvania. He attended Servite High School and graduated in 2003.

While at the University of Pennsylvania Sean lettered in football for 3 years. He was a two time All-Ivy League guard who was elected Unanimous First-team All-Ivy League his senior year. He also served as team captain for the Quakers in the 2006 season.

In 2008, Sean played with the San Jose SaberCats in the Arena Football League. The Sabercats lost in the ArenaBowl to the Philadelphia Soul that year. This was this last year of the AFL before it filed for bankruptcy.

In 2009, Sean played with the New York Sentinels in the inaugural season of the United Football League.
