= Frank Kalil =

American football player (born 1959)

No. 67
- Position: Center

Personal information
- Born: September 1, 1959 (age 67); Ajo, Arizona, U.S.
- Listed height: 6 ft 3 in (1.91 m)
- Listed weight: 260 lb (118 kg)

Career information
- High school: Servite (Anaheim, California)
- College: Arkansas (1978–1979); Arizona (1980–1981)
- NFL draft: 1982: 11th round, 298th overall pick

Career history
- Buffalo Bills (1982)*; Arizona Wranglers (1982–1983); Houston Gamblers (1984–1985)
- * Offseason or practice squad member only

Frank Kalil (born September 1, 1959) is an American former professional football center.

== Early life ==
Kalil played at Servite High School in Anaheim, CA.

== College career ==
Kalil started at the University of Arkansas in 1978 and 1979 but later transferred and graduated from the University of Arizona between 1980 and 1982.

== Professional career ==
Kalil was selected in the 11th round with the 298th overall pick in the 1982 NFL draft by the Buffalo Bills as an offensive guard. Kalil played professionally in the USFL. Kalil played for the Arizona Wranglers from 1982 to 1983 then later played for the Houston Gamblers from 1984 to 1985.

== Personal life ==
Kalil's son Ryan Kalil played collegiately for the USC Trojans before being selected in the second round of the 2007 NFL draft by the Carolina Panthers. USC coach Pete Carroll and USC offensive line coach Pat Ruel were both at Arkansas when Frank Kalil played there. His other son, Matt Kalil was a top prospect in high school and also played for USC before being drafted #4 overall by the Minnesota Vikings in the 2012 NFL draft.
