= A. J. Gass =

American gridiron football player and coach (born 1975)

Montreal Alouettes
- Title: Linebackers coach
- CFL status: American

Personal information
- Born: November 29, 1975 (age 50); Bellflower, California, U.S.
- Listed height: 6 ft 1 in (1.85 m)
- Listed weight: 200 lb (91 kg)

Career information
- Position: Linebacker (No. 77)
- High school: Servite (Anaheim, California)
- College: Fresno State

Career history

Playing
- 1998–2007: Edmonton Eskimos

Coaching
- 2008–2009: Edmonton Eskimos (Defensive assistant)
- 2010–2012: Servite High School (Assistant coach)
- 2013–2014: Servite High School (Head coach)
- 2015–2018: Garces Memorial High School (Head coach)
- 2019–2020: Edmonton Eskimos (Special teams coordinator)
- 2020: Edmonton Football Team (Linebackers coach)
- 2021–2025: Alberta Golden Bears (Special teams coordinator) (Linebackers coach)
- 2026–present: Montreal Alouettes (Linebackers coach)

Awards and highlights
- 2× Grey Cup champion (2003, 2005); 4× CFL All-Star

Career CFL statistics
- Games played: 130
- Defensive tackles: 440
- Special teams tackles: 91
- Sacks: 12
- Interceptions: 3
- Stats at CFL.ca (archived)

A. J. Gass (born November 29, 1975) is an American former professional football linebacker and is the linebackers coach for the Montreal Alouettes of the Canadian Football League (CFL). He played for ten seasons for the Edmonton Eskimos and is a two-time Grey Cup champion after winning in 2003 and 2005.

== Early life ==
Gass attended Servite High School and was the defensive MVP of the Sunset League, All CIF Southern Section and All State defensive back in 1992.

== College career ==
Gass attended Fresno State University and played for the Bulldogs football team. He was an all-conference first-team linebacker in 1996 and 1997, leading the conference in tackles in 1996 with 150.

== Professional career ==
Gass went undrafted in the National Football League and, on May 21, 1998, signed with the Edmonton Eskimos. He appeared in ten games in the 1998 CFL season, and soon established himself as a key member of the Eskimos' lineup. However, he battled a series of career-threatening injuries. In 2000, a ruptured artery in his hand sidelined Gass for 11 weeks. In 2001, 11 games into the season, Gass tore his ACL, MCL, and meniscus and required full reconstructive surgery. He battled back for his starting middle linebacker job in 2002, but in game 15 he tore the same ligaments in his other knee. Once again, Gass battled back again to start the 2003 season with braces on both knees. He went on to win his first championship that season, the 91st Grey Cup with the Eskimos. In 2005, Gass was a key cog in the Eskimos' victory in the 93rd Grey Cup.

Gass faced a suspension in 2007 after he ripped the helmet off Calgary Stampeders lineman John Comiskey during a scuffle, and threw it to the ground. Gass claimed the situation arose after Jeff Pilon had groped his groin. After appealing to an independent arbitrator, Gass avoided his suspension. Later, during team practice, Gass' teammate Sean Fleming made a prank on him by putting a note and a protective jock strap on Gass' stall. The note read, "Sorry for being so frisky. Please accept this gift (the jock strap) as a reminder of my admiration...best of luck with your appeal. Signed: Jeff Pilon, No. 64 (a.k.a. 'Cuddles')". Taped to a rung in the locker stall was a jock strap labelled 'The Pilon Protector.'

In 131 career games, Gass amassed 440 defensive tackles, 91 special teams tackles, 13 pass knockdowns, 12 quarterback sacks, eight forced fumbles, 22 tackles for losses, 11 fumble returns, and three interceptions. He was known for his hard-nosed play and punishing hits on defence and special teams, and was a leader and fan favorite at Commonwealth Stadium. On January 31, 2008, Gass announced his retirement as a player.

== Coaching career ==
On the same day of his retirement as a player, it was announced that Gass had joined the Edmonton Eskimos coaching staff as a defensive assistant. He served in that capacity for two years.

In the summer of 2010, Gass accepted a job and assistant coaching position at Servite High School in Southern California. In 2013, he was named head coach of varsity football for the Friars of the highly regarded Trinity League in the CIF-Southern Section's Pac-5 Division. In two seasons, Gass led Servite to the playoffs twice with an overall record of 10–13.

On January 21, 2020, it was announced that he had added the title of linebackers coach, but the 2020 CFL season was cancelled. On June 16, 2021, the newly named Edmonton Elks announced that Gass had departed the team for personal reasons.

On July 21, 2021, it was announced that Gass had joined the University of Alberta Golden Bears coaching staff as a defensive consultant. In 2022, he was made the team's defensive coordinator. He served in that role for four seasons which was highlighted by the team's 2023 second place finish and 6–2 record.

The Montreal Alouettes announced on February 4, 2026, that Gass had been hired as the team's linebackers coach.
