= Matt Kalil =

American football player (born 1989)

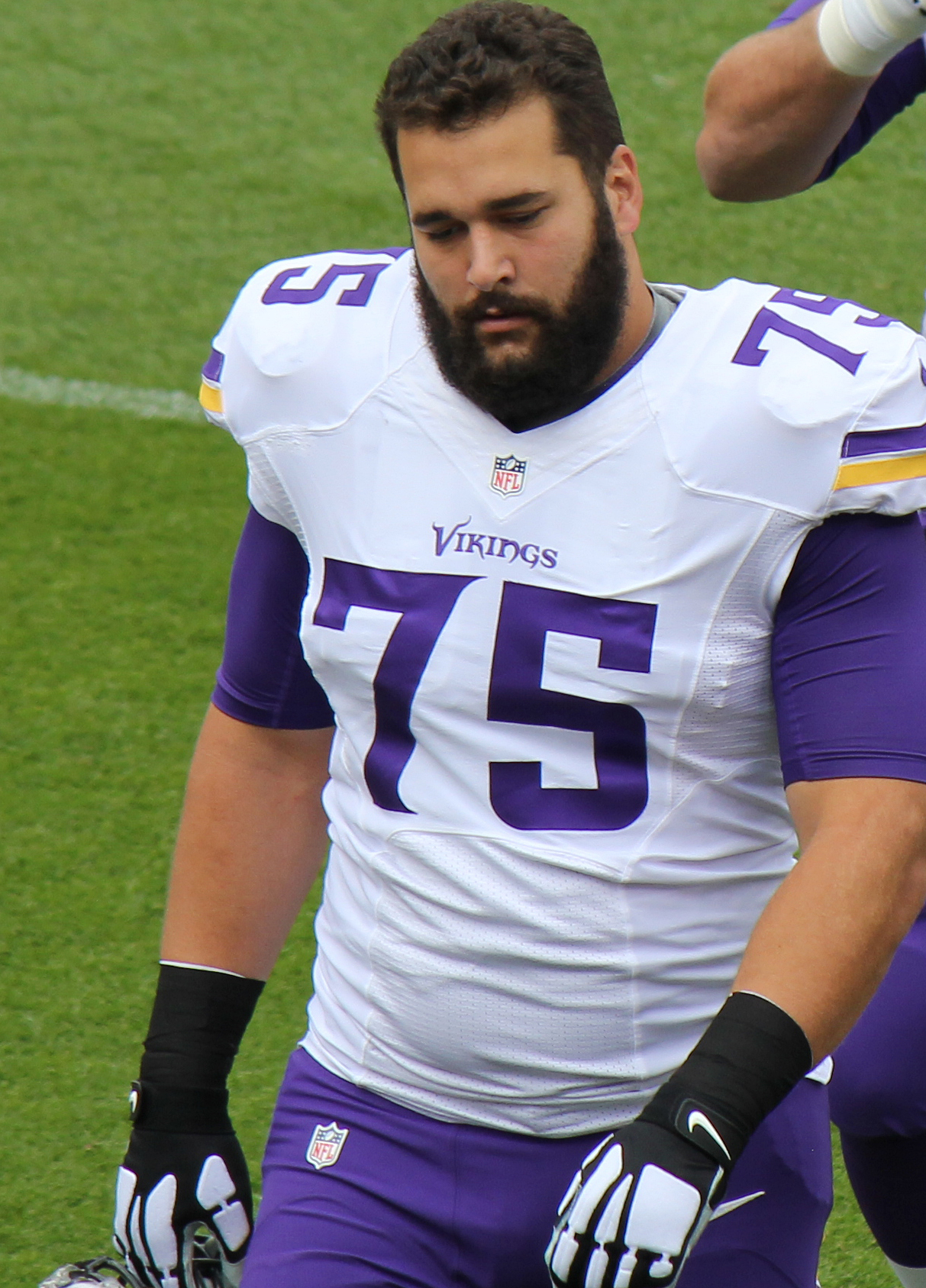
- Kalil with the Minnesota Vikings in 2015

No. 75
- Position: Offensive tackle

Personal information
- Born: July 6, 1989 (age 37); Corona, California, U.S.
- Listed height: 6 ft 7 in (2.01 m)
- Listed weight: 315 lb (143 kg)

Career information
- High school: Servite (Anaheim, California)
- College: USC (2008–2011)
- NFL draft: 2012: 1st round, 4th overall pick

Career history
- Minnesota Vikings (2012–2016); Carolina Panthers (2017–2018); Houston Texans (2019)*
- * Offseason or practice squad member only

Awards and highlights
- Pro Bowl (2012); PFWA All-Rookie Team (2012); Morris Trophy (2011); First-team All-American (2011); First-team All-Pac-12 (2011)

Career NFL statistics
- Games played: 82
- Games started: 82
- Stats at Pro Football Reference

Matthew Francis Kalil (born July 6, 1989) is an American former professional football player who was an offensive tackle in the National Football League (NFL). He played college football for the USC Trojans and was selected by the Minnesota Vikings fourth overall in the 2012 NFL draft. He was also a member of the Carolina Panthers and Houston Texans.

== Early life ==
Kalil attended Servite High School in Anaheim, California, where he played for the Servite Friars high school football team. He made the 2005 Cal-Hi Sports All-State Sophomore first-team.

As a junior in 2006, he made Cal-Hi Sports All-State first-team, Cal-Hi Sports All-State Underclass first-team, All-CIF Pac-5 Division first-team, Los Angeles Times All-Star and All-Trinity League Co-Lineman of the Year.

His 2007 senior season honors included Parade All-American, Super Prep All-American, Prep Star All-American, EA Sports All-American first-team, USA Today All-USA second-team, Scout.com All-American second-team, and ESPN 150, as a senior offensive and defensive lineman at Servite High in Anaheim. Kalil also participated in track & field at Servite, where he had top-throws of 13.55 meters (44 feet, 4 inches) in the shot put and 39.80 meters (130 feet, 5 inches) in the discus.

Considered a five-star recruit by Rivals.com, Kalil was listed as the No. 3 offensive tackle in the class of 2008. He played in the 2008 U.S. Army All-American Bowl on a West squad that featured fellow USC offensive lineman Tyron Smith.

== College career ==
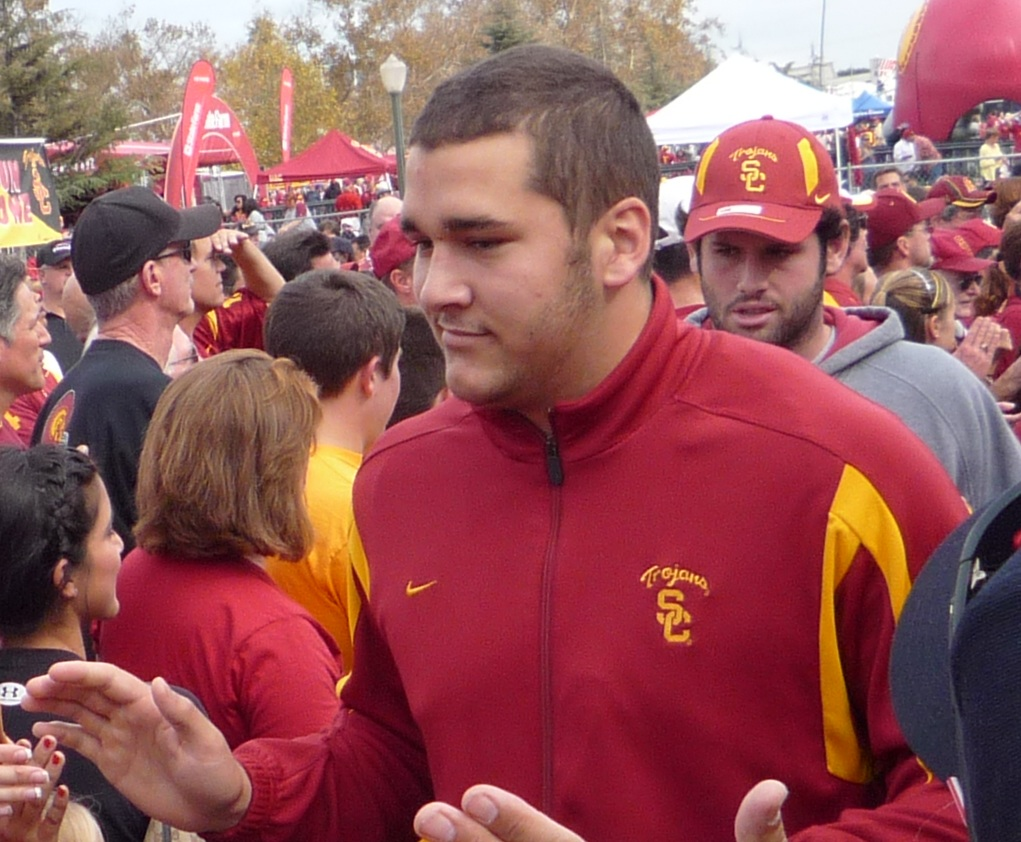
Kalil during the 2008 season.

After redshirting his initial year at USC, Kalil served as backup to Tyron Smith at right tackle. He started against Boston College and performed well, and saw limited action in 11 other games (all but Arizona State) and played primarily on special teams. In his sophomore year, Kalil beat Smith to replace Charles Brown at left tackle, where he started all 13 games. He also played on the defensive line for special teams and blocked a point after touchdown against Notre Dame.

As a junior, Kalil retained his starting left tackle spot, helping the Trojans average 456.8 yards of total offense. The Trojans' offensive line only allowed an FBS-low eight sacks of quarterback Matt Barkley, none of which were allowed by Kalil. For his effort, Kalil was named to several All-American teams, while also becoming the 12th Trojan offensive lineman to win the Morris Trophy. Kalil was also semifinalist for the 2011 Lombardi Award.

== Professional career ==
=== 2012 NFL draft ===
Kalil was regarded as the best offensive tackle prospect for the 2012 NFL draft. He declared for the draft on December 16. After a strong performance at the NFL Combine, Kalil was projected to be the No. 3 draft pick by the Minnesota Vikings. The Vikings eventually selected Kalil, but not until trading down to the fourth spot. They had not selected an offensive lineman in the first round since Bryant McKinnie in 2002.

Kalil was USC's fifth offensive lineman selected in the top-5 of an NFL draft, after Ron Yary in 1968, Marvin Powell in 1977, Anthony Muñoz in 1980, and Tony Boselli in 1995. With Tyron Smith having been selected ninth overall in 2011, it also made USC the first school with consecutive top-10 selected offensive lineman since Texas' Leonard Davis (2001) and Mike Williams (2002).

Pre-draft measurables
Height	Weight	Arm length	Hand span	Wingspan	40-yard dash	10-yard split	20-yard split	20-yard shuttle	Three-cone drill	Vertical jump	Bench press
6 ft 6 5/8 in (2.00 m)	306 lb (139 kg)	34 1/2 in (0.88 m)	10 3/8 in (0.26 m)	6 ft 9 3/8 in (2.07 m)	5.13 s	1.81 s	2.96 s	4.65 s	7.33 s	27.0 in (0.69 m)	30 reps
All values from NFL Combine

=== Minnesota Vikings ===
Kalil was signed to a four-year contract by the Minnesota Vikings on July 26, 2012. He was selected to attend the Pro Bowl after Washington Redskins offensive tackle Trent Williams was injured during a night club fight. He was named to the PFWA All-Rookie Team. In week 6 of the 2013 NFL season, he faced off against his brother, Ryan Kalil, and the visiting Carolina Panthers, in which the Panthers won 35–10. Also in that game, the Kalils' sister, Danielle Kalil, sang the national anthem.

On September 21, 2016, Kalil was placed on injured reserve with a hip injury.

=== Carolina Panthers ===
On March 10, 2017, Kalil signed a five-year, $55 million contract with the Carolina Panthers. He and his brother Ryan were the third set of brothers to play on the same offensive line in the NFL and the first set of brothers to do it in 24 years. In his first season with the Panthers, he started all 16 games at left tackle.

On September 2, 2018, Kalil was placed on injured reserve after undergoing a knee scope.

On March 14, 2019, Kalil was released by the Panthers.

=== Houston Texans ===
On March 22, 2019, Kalil signed with the Houston Texans. On September 1, 2019, Kalil was released by the Houston Texans.

== Personal life ==
Kalil's father is of Lebanese and Mexican descent.

Kalil's father, Frank, was a center at Arkansas and Arizona, and was drafted by the Buffalo Bills in 1982, before playing for the USFL's Arizona Wranglers in 1983 and Houston Gamblers in 1984. His brother Ryan was an All-American at Southern California, and was drafted by the Carolina Panthers in 2007. Their sister Danielle sang the national anthem at the Vikings–Panthers game, which featured both of her brothers, on October 13, 2013.

On July 8, 2015, Kalil married American model Haley Kalil in a ceremony in Kauai, Hawaii. The following year, on July 8, they renewed their vows in a formal ceremony with family and friends, celebrating a year of marriage. She filed for divorce on May 4, 2022. On January 6, 2026, Kalil filed a lawsuit against Haley, alleging that she disclosed intimate details about him during a livestream. On September 18, 2026, the judge dismissed the aforementioned case against Haley.

On April 13, 2024, he married model Keilani Asmus in a small ceremony in Las Vegas at the Little White Chapel.
