= Chase Strumpf =

American baseball player (born 1998)

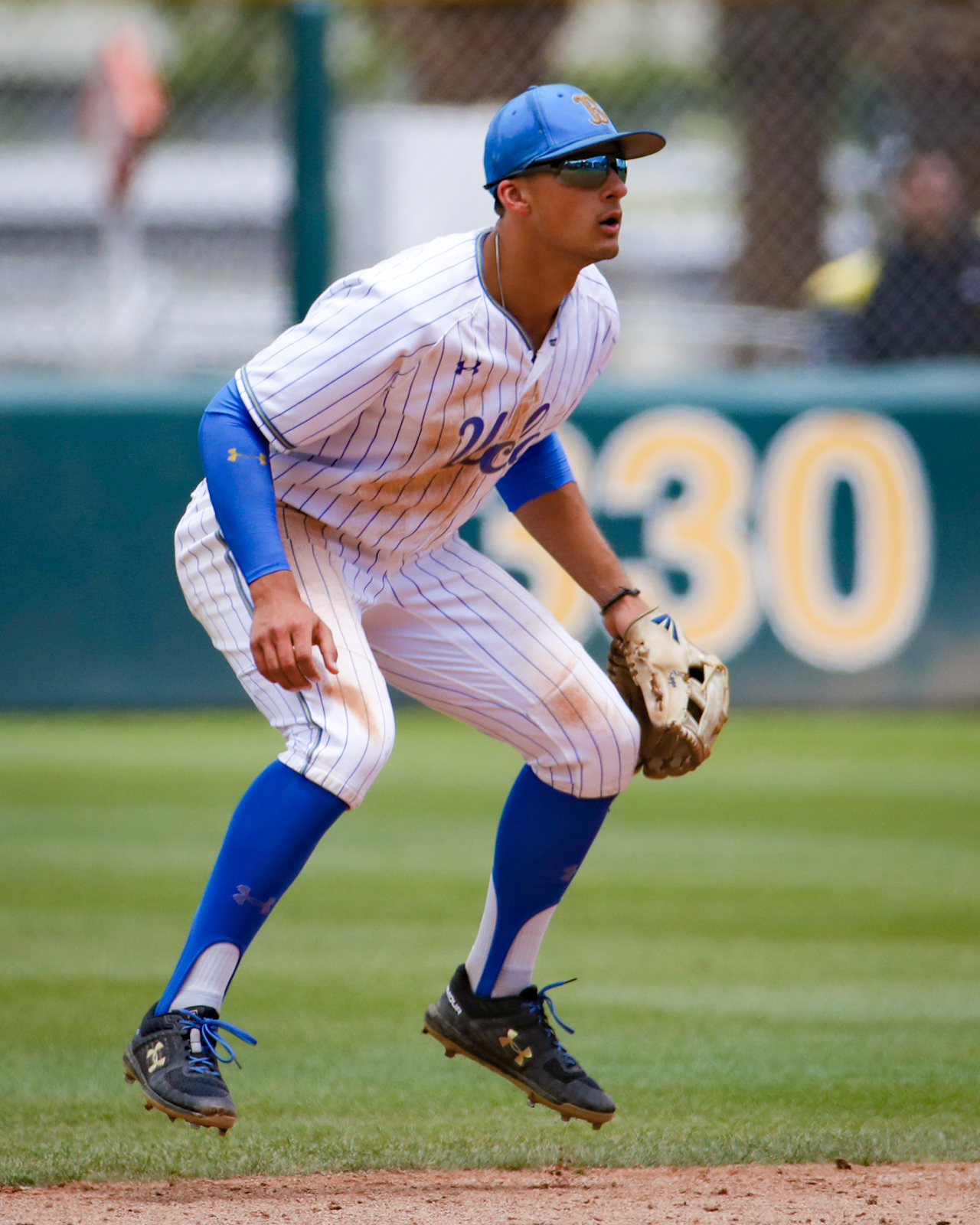
- Strumpf with UCLA in 2019
- Second baseman / Third baseman
- Born: March 8, 1998 (age 28); Atlanta, Georgia, U.S.
- Bats: Right Throws: Right

Chase Aaron Strumpf (born March 8, 1998) is an American former professional baseball second baseman and third baseman. He played college baseball at UCLA. Strumpf was selected by the Chicago Cubs in the second round of the 2019 Major League Baseball draft.

== Early life ==
Strumpf was born in Atlanta, Georgia, grew up in Dana Point, California, and is Jewish. His parents are Gregg and Nani Strumpf, and he has a sister named Chloe.

== Amateur career ==
=== High school ===
Strumpf attended JSerra Catholic High School in San Juan Capistrano, California. During his freshman year, he committed to play college baseball at UCLA. After his freshman year, he played on the USA Baseball 15U National Team, helping Team USA win a gold medal in Barranquilla, Colombia. He was a 2014 Perfect Game USA second team Underclass All-American, a 2015 Perfect Game USA first team Underclass All-American, and a 2016 Rawlings/Perfect Game Honorable Mention All-American. He was not drafted out of high school in the 2016 Major League Baseball draft, and enrolled at UCLA.

=== College ===
In 2017, Strumpf's freshman year at UCLA, playing second base he appeared in 55 games (making 54 starts), hitting .239/.315/.399 with seven home runs and 30 RBI. That summer, he played for the Duluth Huskies in the wood bat Northwoods League, where after playing primarily shortstop and batting .335/.425/.549 (ninth in the league) over 164 at-bats with six home runs, he was named a post-season All-Star. As a sophomore at UCLA in 2018, Strumpf started 58 games in which he slashed .363/.475/.633 with 59 runs, 23 doubles, 12 home runs, 53 RBI, and 45 walks, ranking second in doubles and third in on-base percentage while ranking in the top ten in the other statistics (except RBI) within the conference. He was top-50 in the NCAA in doubles (13th), on-base percentage (25th), total bases (36th), and slugging percentage (49th). He was named to the Pac-12 First Team, and was named D1Baseball, Collegiate Baseball, and Perfect Game All-American second team. After the season, he was selected to play for the USA Baseball Collegiate National Team, but was unable to participate due to injury.

Prior to his 2019 junior season, Strumpf was named a preseason All-American by D1Baseball, Perfect Game, Baseball America, Collegiate Baseball, and the National Collegiate Baseball Writers Association. He finished his junior year batting .279/.416/.472 in 233 at bats with nine home runs, 44 RBI, 48 walks (fifth in the conference), and eight hit by pitch (eighth) in 63 games. He was again named to the Pac-12 First Team. In his three-season college career he batted an aggregate .297/.409/.507, while playing second base where he had a .983 fielding percentage.

== Professional career ==
=== 2019–21 ===
Strumpf was considered one of the top prospects for the 2019 Major League Baseball draft. He was selected by the Chicago Cubs in the second round with the 64th overall pick, and signed for a signing bonus of $1.05 million.

Strumpf made his professional debut in 2019 with the Rookie-level Arizona League Cubs, and was promoted to the Eugene Emeralds of the Low-A Northwest League after seven games. After 26 games with Eugene, he was promoted to the South Bend Cubs of the Single-A Midwest League with whom he finished the year while playing through a back injury. Over 39 games between the three clubs, Strumpf slashed .244/.374/.400 in 135 at-bats with three home runs and 17 RBI, while playing second base. He was named a 2019 Northwest League Mid-Season All Star. He did not play a minor league game in 2020 due to the cancellation of the minor league season caused by the COVID-19 pandemic, but in the instructional league he batted .375/.414/.792.

To begin the 2021 season, Strumpf was assigned back to South Bend, now members of the High-A Central. On June 1, he was promoted to the Tennessee Smokies of the Double-A South. In late August, he was placed on the injured list and missed the remainder of the season. Over 78 games played between South Bend and Tennessee, Strumpf slashed .231/.352/.381 in 268 at-bats with 19 doubles, seven home runs, and 36 RBI. He played 56 games at third base and 18 games at second base.

=== 2022–26 ===
Strumpf returned to Tennessee for the 2022 season. Over 116 games and 393 at-bats, he slashed .234/.379/.461 with 73 runs (seventh in the league), 22 doubles, 21 home runs (seventh), 57 RBI, 73 walks (fifth), and 19 hit by pitch (second). In the field he played second base (59 games), third base (55 games), and first base (3 games). He was named an MiLB Organization All Star.

Strumpf returned to Tennessee to open the 2023 season, and hit .258/.401/.500. In late May, he was promoted to the Iowa Cubs of the Triple-A International League. Over 104 games between both affiliates, Strumpf hit .229/.373/.464 with 72 runs, 21 home runs, 66 RBI, and 72 walks in 349 at-bats. Between the two teams, in the field he played 45 games at third base, 43 games at second base, and seven games at first base.

Strumpf split the 2024 campaign between Iowa and the rookie-level Arizona Complex League Cubs, batting a cumulative .235/.346/.411 with 12 home runs and 37 RBI. Strumpf made 99 appearances for Triple-A Iowa in 2025, batting .221/.355/.405 with 13 home runs, 49 RBI, and 10 stolen bases. He elected free agency following the season on November 6, 2025.
