= Ryan Kalil =

American football player (born 1985)

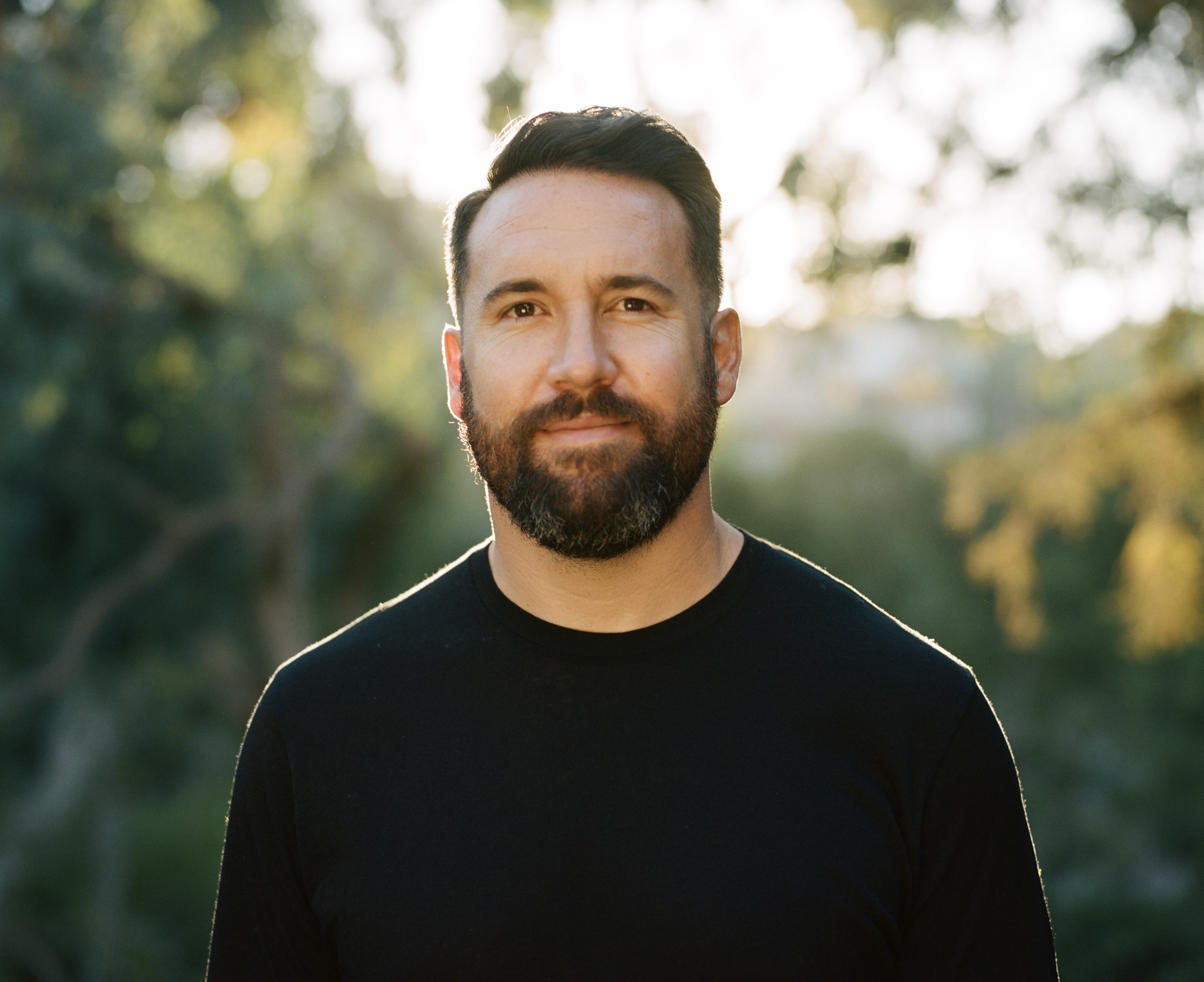
- Kalil in 2021
- Born: Ryan Joseph Kalil; March 29, 1985 (age 41); Tucson, Arizona, U.S.
- Education: University of Southern California
- Occupations: American football player; businessman; producer; writer
- Years active: 2003–2019 (football); 2016–present (media)
- Spouse: Natalie Nelson (m. 2008)
- Children: 4
- Relatives: Frank Kalil (father); Matt Kalil (brother)
- Football career

No. 65, 67, 55
- Position: Center

Personal information
- Listed height: 6 ft 2 in (1.88 m)
- Listed weight: 300 lb (136 kg)

Career information
- High school: Servite (Anaheim, California)
- College: USC (2003–2006)
- NFL draft: 2007: 2nd round, 59th overall pick

Career history
- Carolina Panthers (2007–2018); New York Jets (2019)

Awards and highlights
- 2× First-team All-Pro (2013, 2015); Second-team All-Pro (2011); 5× Pro Bowl (2009–2011, 2013, 2015); First-team All-American (2006); Morris Trophy (2006); 2× First-team All-Pac-10 (2005, 2006)

Career NFL statistics
- Games played: 155
- Games started: 152
- Stats at Pro Football Reference

Ryan Joseph Kalil (born March 29, 1985) is an American film and television producer and former professional football player. He played as a center in the National Football League (NFL), primarily with the Carolina Panthers. He was a three-time All-Pro, twice named to the first team, and a five-time Pro Bowl selection.

Kalil played college football for the USC Trojans, where he was a member of two national championship teams, was named a first-team All-American, and won the 2006 Morris Trophy. He was selected by the Panthers in the second round of the 2007 NFL draft, where he played for 12 seasons. He also played one season with the New York Jets. Kalil was selected to the Pro Bowl in 2009, 2010, 2011, 2013, and 2015.

== Early life ==
Kalil was born Ryan Joseph Kalil in 1985 to Frank and Cheryl Kalil. His father, Frank, played football for the University of Arkansas and the University of Arizona. He was selected by the National Football League Buffalo Bills in 1982 and later played in the United States Football League until 1984. His mother, Cheryl (Van Cleave), was Miss California in 1981. He is of Lebanese and Mexican heritage and has two siblings. His brother, Matt, is a former starting offensive tackle at USC and was drafted fourth overall by the Minnesota Vikings in 2012. They were the third set of brothers to play on the same offensive line in the NFL when Matt joined Ryan on the Panthers in 2017 and the first set of brothers to do it in 24 years. Their sister Danielle sang the national anthem at the Vikings–Panthers game, which featured both her brothers, on October 13, 2013.

== Early career ==
=== High school career ===
Born in Tucson, Arizona and raised in Corona, California, Kalil went to Servite High School in Anaheim, California, where he was teammates with future New England Patriots wide receiver/special teams and fellow NFL future All Pro Matthew Slater.

=== College career ===
Kalil attended the University of Southern California, where he played for the USC Trojans football team. He was a 2005 Sports Illustrated All-American, won the USC Trojans' Bob Chandler Award in 2005 and Courage Award in 2004, and was on the watch list for the Lombardi Award.

Kalil was on the official watch list for the Rimington Trophy for the top college football center and the Outland Trophy watch list for the best lineman. He was named to the 2005 and 2006 Pac-10 coaches and Rivals.com All-Pac-10 team First Team. He was a Pro Football Weekly All-American choice and a Rivals.com second-team All American and SI.com honorable mention All-American.

Kalil was voted "lineman of the year" by his Trojans teammates and won the 2006 Morris Trophy. He was invited to play in the Senior Bowl prior to the 2007 NFL Draft.

In 2003, Kalil and the Trojans finished the regular season 11–1 and ranked No. 1 in the AP and coaches' polls. However, USC was left out of the BCS championship game after finishing third in the BCS behind Oklahoma and LSU. The Trojans went to the Rose Bowl and played University of Michigan. That 2003 season saw split national champions, as LSU won the BCS title, while USC was crowned champion by the AP. Kalil appeared in two BCS Championship Games: 2005's win against the University of Oklahoma and 2006's loss to University of Texas.

== Professional football career ==
=== Pre-draft ===
Pre-draft measurables
Height	Weight	Arm length	Hand span	40-yard dash	10-yard split	20-yard split	20-yard shuttle	Three-cone drill	Vertical jump	Broad jump	Bench press
6 ft 2 3/4 in (1.90 m)	299 lb (136 kg)	31 1/2 in (0.80 m)	10 in (0.25 m)	5.01 s	1.77 s	2.91 s	4.34 s	7.50 s	26.0 in (0.66 m)	8 ft 8 in (2.64 m)	34 reps
All values from NFL Combine

Kalil ran the 40-yard dash in 4.94 seconds at the 2007 NFL Combine and bench pressed 225 pounds 34 times. His performances at the combine and the Senior Bowl impressed scouts and led many analysts to project he would be selected in the first or second round of the 2007 NFL draft.

=== Carolina Panthers ===
Kalil was selected in the second round of the draft with the 59th pick by the Carolina Panthers. He was the first center to be selected in the 2007 draft and joined his teammate from the USC Trojans, Dwayne Jarrett, who the Panthers also selected in the second round.

In 2007, Kalil started three games at center.

In 2008, Kalil was named the full-time starter at center. He started in all 12 games that he appeared, missing four games due to injury.

In the 2009 season, Kalil started in all 16 games. He was named as a Pro Bowler for the first time for the 2009 season.

Kalil started all 16 games in the 2010 season. He earned Pro Bowl honors for the second consecutive time with his performance in the 2010 season.

In 2011, Kalil received a franchise tag from the Panthers. On August 19, 2011, the Panthers signed Kalil to a six-year $49 million deal, making him the highest paid center in NFL history. He started all 16 games in the 2011 season. He was selected to the Pro Bowl as the starting center of the NFC team. He was ranked 99th by his fellow players on the NFL Top 100 Players of 2012.

In the 2012 season, Kalil started five games before going on injured reserve.

Kalil started all 16 regular season games and the Panthers' one postseason game in the 2013 season. He earned Pro Bowl and first team All-Pro honors for the 2013 season. He was ranked 93rd by his fellow players on the NFL Top 100 Players of 2014.

Kalil started all 16 regular season games and both of the Panthers' postseason games in the 2014 season.

He earned Pro Bowl and first team All-Pro honors for the 2015 season.

It was announced on December 23, 2015, that Kalil was one of ten players on the Carolina Panthers voted into the 2016 Pro Bowl, making it his fifth appearance. He could not play in the Pro Bowl due to the Panthers appearance in Super Bowl 50. For the 2015 season, PFF rated Kalil as the third-best run-blocking center in the NFL. On February 7, 2016, Kalil was part of the Panthers team that played in Super Bowl 50. In the game, the Panthers fell to the Denver Broncos by a score of 24–10. He was ranked 79th by his fellow players on the NFL Top 100 Players of 2016.

On June 6, 2016, Kalil signed a two-year extension with the Panthers. He had been dealing with a shoulder injury for several weeks before leaving the Week 11 game against the New Orleans Saints. He was placed on injured reserve on November 29, 2016, ending his season.

In 2017, Kalil started only six games after dealing with a neck injury for most of the season.

On December 31, 2018, Kalil announced his retirement from the NFL after 12 seasons. He started in all 16 games in the 2018 season.

=== New York Jets ===
On August 1, 2019, Kalil came out of his brief retirement to sign a one-year contract with the New York Jets. He was placed on injured reserve on November 16, 2019. He appeared in and started seven games in the 2019 season.

== In media ==
=== Film and television ===
Kalil has interests in the film industry, having made claymation films as a child. He interned at Legendary Pictures during offseasons.

He directed fellow USC-alumnus Will Ferrell on a football training spoof for the NFL Network and his short film, The Take Off, which premiered at The 34th Annual Santa Barbara International Film Festival on January 29, 2019.

Kalil founded Mortal Media in 2016 with friend Blake Griffin. The pair teamed up on the suggestion of Thomas Tull, who ran Legendary Pictures. Kalil and Griffin have sold eight movie and television projects, five of which are in active development, most notably Apple TV+'s Hello Tomorrow! and reboots of White Men Can't Jump and Disney's The Rocketeer.

=== Books ===
In June 2016, Deadline Hollywood announced he will serve as an executive producer along with Dwayne Johnson producing Sony Pictures film "Son of Shaolin." Kalil financed production of the underlying graphic novel.

Ryan Kalil, Shawn Kittelsen and Chris B. Murray created Savage Game, a Comixology Originals 60-page sci-fi graphic novel that is a high-tech version of The Island of Dr. Moreau.

Kalil also co-wrote The Rookie Handbook with former Carolina offensive line teammates Jordan Gross and Geoff Hangartner. The Rookie Handbook is a humorous and insightful look at the life of an NFL rookie. It's designed to give a behind the scenes glimpse at life in the big leagues for the legions of NFL fans.

=== Podcast network and production company ===
In March 2022, Kalil, along with Vince Vaughn and Greg Olsen, launched a podcast network and production company named Audiorama. The first podcast available from the network, called Youth, Inc., focuses on youth sports.

== Personal life ==
Kalil resides in Manhattan Beach, California, with his wife, Natalie, and their four children. Ryan started the Kalil Family Foundation with his wife, which works to greatly accelerate lupus research and improve life for people living with lupus. The foundation also supports pioneering solutions to end homelessness in the United States and abroad. He is Catholic.

Kalil was announced as one of the investors in an almost all-female group that was awarded a new franchise in the National Women's Soccer League, the top level of women's sport in the U.S. The new team, since unveiled as Angel City FC, is set to start play in 2022.
