= Kurt Vollers =

American football player (born 1979)

No. 78, 60
- Position: Tackle / Guard

Personal information
- Born: April 4, 1979 (age 47); San Gabriel, California, U.S.
- Listed height: 6 ft 7 in (2.01 m)
- Listed weight: 300 lb (136 kg)

Career information
- High school: Servite (Anaheim, California)
- College: Notre Dame
- NFL draft: 2002: undrafted

Career history
- Indianapolis Colts (2002)*; Dallas Cowboys (2002–2004); Indianapolis Colts (2005)
- * Offseason or practice squad member only

Awards and highlights
- All-Independent (2001)

Career NFL statistics
- Games played: 29
- Games started: 11
- Stats at Pro Football Reference

Kurt Fredrick Vollers (born April 4, 1979) is an American former professional football player who was an offensive tackle in the National Football League (NFL) for the Dallas Cowboys and Indianapolis Colts. He played college football for the Notre Dame Fighting Irish.

== Early life ==
Vollers attended Servite High School, where he played as a defensive tackle. As a senior, he registered 79 tackles and 8 sacks, while earning USA Today honorable-mention All-American and All-state honors. He contributed to his team winning league titles in 1995 and 1996.

He also practiced basketball, track and baseball. As a junior, he was the league champion in the discus throw and shot put.

== College career ==
Vollers accepted a football scholarship from the University of Notre Dame. He was converted into an offensive guard as a freshman. The next year, he played mainly on special teams until starting the last three games at left tackle in place of an injured Jordan Black.

As a junior, he became the regular starter at right tackle, helping the team finish the season 14th in the Nation in rushing (213.5 yards-per-game). As a senior, he started 9 games at right tackle and 2 at right guard, blocking for running backs Tony Fisher and Julius Jones.

== Professional career ==
Pre-draft measurables
| Height | Weight | Arm length | Hand span | 40-yard dash | 10-yard split | 20-yard split | Vertical jump | Bench press |
|---|---|---|---|---|---|---|---|---|
| 6 ft 7 1/8 in (2.01 m) | 321 lb (146 kg) | 34 in (0.86 m) | 9 3/4 in (0.25 m) | 5.40 s | 1.88 s | 3.11 s | 30.5 in (0.77 m) | 30 reps |
All values from NFL Combine

=== Indianapolis Colts (first stint) ===
Vollers was signed as an undrafted free agent by the Indianapolis Colts after the 2002 NFL draft on April 21. He was waived before the start of the season on September 1 and signed to the practice squad the next day.

=== Dallas Cowboys ===
On October 23, 2002, the Dallas Cowboys signed Vollers from the Colts' practice squad. The next year, he started 8 games at right tackle in place of an injured Ryan Young.

In 2004, he was passed on the depth chart by Torrin Tucker, until regaining his starter role at right tackle for the last 3 games of the season. The next year, a right wrist injury limited his playing time during training camp and was waived injured on September 3, 2005.

=== Indianapolis Colts (second stint) ===
On November 16, 2005, he was signed as a free agent by the Indianapolis Colts. He played in 2 games and was declared inactive in 6 contests. He was not re-signed at the end of the season.
