= Bellflower, California =

City in California, United States

- City
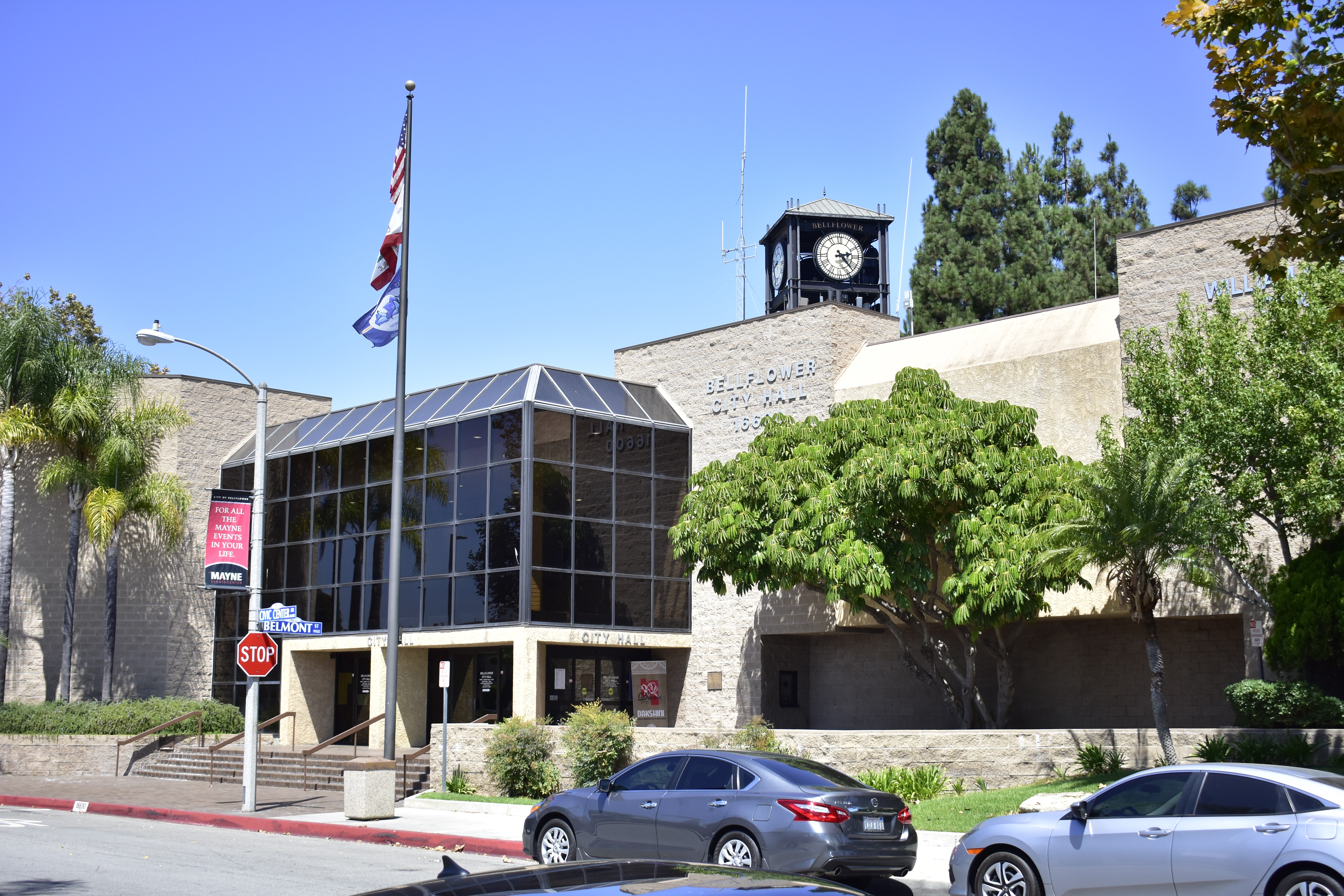

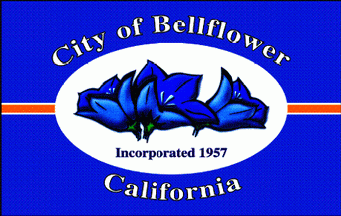
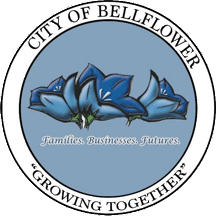
- Flag Seal
- Nickname: "The Friendly City"
- Motto: "Growing Together"
- Interactive map of Bellflower, California
- Location in the United States
- Coordinates: 33°53′17″N 118°7′39″W
- Country: United States
- State: California
- County: Los Angeles
- Founded: 1906
- Incorporated: September 3, 1957
- Named for: Yellow bellflower apple

Government
  - Mayor: Ray Dunton
  - Mayor Pro Tem: Sonny Santa Ines
  - City council: Dan Koops; Wendi Morse; Victor A. Sanchez
  - City Manager: Ryan C. Smoot

Area
  - Total: 6.17 sq mi (15.97 km^{2})
  - Land: 6.12 sq mi (15.84 km^{2})
  - Water: 0.050 sq mi (0.13 km^{2}) 0.86%
- Elevation: 72 ft (22 m)

Population (2020)
  - Total: 79,190
  - Density: 12,945.4/sq mi (4,998.23/km^{2})
- Time zone: UTC-8 (Pacific)
  - Summer (DST): UTC-7 (PDT)
- ZIP codes: 90706, 90707
- Area code: 562
- FIPS code: 06-04982
- GNIS feature IDs: 1652671, 2409822
- Website: www.bellflower.ca.gov

Bellflower is a city in southeastern Los Angeles County, California, United States, in the Los Angeles metropolitan area. It was founded in 1906 and incorporated on September 3, 1957. As of the 2020 census, the city had a total population of 79,190, up from 76,616 at the 2010 census. This made it the 65th-most densely populated city in the United States of cities over 50,000 residents (and the eighth-most densely populated city in California).

== History ==
The original title to the Bellflower area dates back to 1784 with one of the first Spanish land grants in California. The Bellflower area was a hunting and fishing spot due to an abundance of wild game, ducks and geese, carp and perch. The area was also used for cattle and grazing dairy cows but settlers moved away. Willow, bamboo, and underbrush, wild grape, blackberry, and rose bushes were grown along the river the name of The Willows and The Wilderness.

The site was formerly rich farmland watered by artesian wells and floodwaters of the now-contained San Gabriel River. In 1906, F.E. Woodruff, a local real estate investor, founded the first municipality on the site, which was named Somerset in 1909 when a post office was established there. However, the proponents of the name 'Bellflower' claimed that the US Post Office Department rejected the name 'Somerset' to prevent confusion with Somerset, Colorado. The present name is derived from the bellflower apple, which was grown in local orchards during the early 20th-century.

Originally settled by dairy farmers of Dutch, Japanese, and Portuguese descent, Bellflower and neighboring Paramount served first as the apple and later the milk production centers for Southern California, until soaring post-World War II property values forced most of the farmers to move several miles east to the Dairy Valley/Dairyland/Dairy City area (now the cities of Cerritos, La Palma, and Cypress). These farms were in turn converted into large housing subdivisions for Los Angeles's growing population that worked in the region's skilled industrial and service sectors. As a result, amongst the highly diverse backgrounds in Bellflower, there remains today a notable number of residents of Dutch descent; Bellflower is one of the only cities in the US to boast multiple Dutch grocery stores.

After Bellflower was incorporated in 1957, its gradual metamorphosis from agricultural center to residential suburb continued. From the 1950s through the late 1960s, Bellflower Boulevard, the city's main thoroughfare, was a thriving commercial strip for shopping. Numerous retail and franchise restaurant firms began on this street, which also featured middle- and high-end boutiques, arts and crafts shops, and other small shopkeeps alongside larger department stores and banks. Today, Bellflower is an urban community within greater Southeast Los Angeles, and ranks amongst the most densely populated cities in the United States. It is a sister city with Los Mochis, Sinaloa, Mexico.

== Geography ==
Bellflower is located at 33°53′17″N 118°07′39″W.

According to the United States Census Bureau, the city has a total area of 6.2 square miles (16 km^{2}), of which 6.1 square miles (16 km^{2}) is land and 0.1 square miles (0.26 km^{2}) (0.86%) is water.

Bellflower is bordered by Downey on the north and northwest, Norwalk and Cerritos on the east, Lakewood on the south, Long Beach on the southwest, and Paramount on the west. Bellflower is part of Southeast Los Angeles County and the "Gateway Cities Council of Governments" (GCOG).

== Demographics ==
Historical population
Census	Pop.	Note	%±
1960	45,909		—
1970	52,334		14.0%
1980	53,441		2.1%
1990	61,815		15.7%
2000	72,878		17.9%
2010	76,616		5.1%
2020	79,190		3.4%
U.S. Decennial Census; 1860–1870 1880-1890; 1900 1910 1920; 1930 1940 1950; 1960 1970 1980; 1990 2000 2010; 2020

Bellflower first appeared as a city in the 1960 U.S. census as part of the Downey-Norwalk census county division. Prior to 1960, the area was included in the unincorporated portion of the now defunct Downey Township (1950 pop. 109,659).

=== Racial and ethnic composition ===
Bellflower city, California – Racial and ethnic composition Note: the US Census treats Hispanic/Latino as an ethnic category. This table excludes Latinos from the racial categories and assigns them to a separate category. Hispanics/Latinos may be of any race.
Race / Ethnicity (NH = Non-Hispanic)	Pop 1980	Pop 1990	Pop 2000	Pop 2010	Pop 2020	% 1980	% 1990	% 2000	% 2010	% 2020
White alone (NH)	41,928	36,884	22,403	14,971	10,815	78.46%	59.67%	30.74%	19.54%	13.66%
Black or African American alone (NH)	810	3,742	9,239	10,374	10,131	1.52%	6.05%	12.68%	13.54%	12.79%
Native American or Alaska Native alone (NH)	414	392	280	229	183	0.77%	0.63%	0.38%	0.30%	0.23%
Asian alone (NH)	2,233	5,909	6,976	8,720	9,855	4.18%	9.56%	9.57%	11.38%	12.44%
Native Hawaiian or Pacific Islander alone (NH)	2,233	5,909	475	567	531	4.18%	9.56%	0.65%	0.74%	0.67%
Other race alone (NH)	113	112	188	163	376	0.21%	0.18%	0.26%	0.21%	0.47%
Mixed race or Multiracial (NH)	x	x	1,814	1,508	2,049	x	x	2.49%	1.97%	2.59%
Hispanic or Latino (any race)	7,943	14,776	31,503	40,085	45,250	14.86%	23.91%	43.23%	52.32%	57.14%
Total	53,441	61,815	72,878	76,616	79,190	100.00%	100.00%	100.00%	100.00%	100.00%

=== 2020 census ===
As of the 2020 census, Bellflower had a population of 79,190 and a population density of 12,945.9 inhabitants per square mile (4,998.4/km^{2}). The racial makeup of Bellflower was 21.5% White, 13.3% African American, 1.7% Native American, 12.8% Asian, 0.7% Pacific Islander, 33.3% from other races, and 16.6% from two or more races. Hispanic or Latino of any race were 57.1% of the population. 100.0% of residents lived in urban areas, while 0.0% lived in rural areas.

The age distribution was 23.4% under the age of 18, 10.2% aged 18 to 24, 29.2% aged 25 to 44, 25.0% aged 45 to 64, and 12.0% who were 65 years of age or older. The median age was 35.4 years. For every 100 females, there were 94.2 males, and for every 100 females age 18 and over there were 91.2 males age 18 and over.

The census reported that 98.6% of the population lived in households, 0.8% lived in non-institutionalized group quarters, and 0.6% were institutionalized. There were 24,631 households, of which 40.5% had children under the age of 18 living in them; 44.4% were married-couple households; 7.9% were cohabiting couple households; 29.8% had a female householder with no spouse or partner present; and 17.9% had a male householder with no spouse or partner present. About 18.4% of households were made up of individuals and 7.5% had someone living alone who was 65 years of age or older, and the average household size was 3.17. There were 18,728 families (76.0% of all households).

There were 25,220 housing units at an average density of 4,122.9 units per square mile (1,591.9 units/km^{2}), of which 24,631 (97.7%) were occupied; 2.3% were vacant, with a homeowner vacancy rate of 0.4% and a rental vacancy rate of 2.2%. Of the occupied units, 39.2% were owner-occupied and 60.8% were occupied by renters.

Racial composition as of the 2020 census
Race	Number	Percent
White	16,995	21.5%
Black or African American	10,552	13.3%
American Indian and Alaska Native	1,380	1.7%
Asian	10,104	12.8%
Native Hawaiian and Other Pacific Islander	582	0.7%
Some other race	26,393	33.3%
Two or more races	13,184	16.6%
Hispanic or Latino (of any race)	45,250	57.1%

In 2023, the US Census Bureau estimated that the median household income was $77,602, and the per capita income was $29,633. About 10.6% of families and 13.2% of the population were below the poverty line.

=== 2010 census ===
At the 2010 census Bellflower had a population of 76,616. The population density was 12,416.7 inhabitants per square mile (4,794.1/km^{2}). The racial makeup of Bellflower was 32,337 (42.2%) White (19.5% Non-Hispanic White), 10,760 (14.0%) African American, 731 (1.0%) Native American, 8,865 (11.6%) Asian, 615 (0.8%) Pacific Islander, 19,732 (25.8%) from other races, and 3,576 (4.7%) from two or more races. Hispanic or Latino of any race were 40,085 persons (52.3%).

The census reported that 75,877 people (99.0% of the population) lived in households, 399 (0.5%) lived in non-institutionalized group quarters, and 340 (0.4%) were institutionalized.

There were 23,651 households, 11,029 (46.6%) had children under the age of 18 living in them, 10,992 (46.5%) were opposite-sex married couples living together, 4,812 (20.3%) had a female householder with no husband present, 1,965 (8.3%) had a male householder with no wife present. There were 1,666 (7.0%) unmarried opposite-sex partnerships, and 170 (0.7%) same-sex married couples or partnerships. 4,618 households (19.5%) were one person and 1,540 (6.5%) had someone living alone who was 65 or older. The average household size was 3.21. There were 17,769 families (75.1% of households); the average family size was 3.67.

The age distribution was 21,749 people (28.4%) under the age of 18, 8,493 people (11.1%) aged 18 to 24, 22,418 people (29.3%) aged 25 to 44, 17,339 people (22.6%) aged 45 to 64, and 6,617 people (8.6%) who were 65 or older. The median age was 31.9 years. For every 100 females, there were 94.4 males. For every 100 females age 18 and over, there were 90.6 males.

There were 24,897 housing units at an average density of 4,034.9 per square mile, of the occupied units 9,459 (40.0%) were owner-occupied and 14,192 (60.0%) were rented. The homeowner vacancy rate was 1.7%; the rental vacancy rate was 5.1%. 31,897 people (41.6% of the population) lived in owner-occupied housing units and 43,980 people (57.4%) lived in rental housing units.

According to the 2010 United States Census, Bellflower had a median household income of $49,637, with 17.1% of the population living below the federal poverty line.

As of 2000, Mexican and German were the most common ancestries. Mexico and the Philippines were the most common foreign places of birth in 2000.

== Economy ==
=== Top employers ===
According to the city's 2021 Annual Comprehensive Financial Report, the top employers in the city are:

#	Employer	# of Employees
1	Kaiser Permanente Medical Group	419
2	Taco Nazo	196
3	City of Bellflower	192
4	Tulaphorn Inc (McDonald's franchisee)	157
5	George Chevrolet	148
6	Cerritos Vista Healthcare Center	134
7	Bel Tooren Villa Convalescent Hospital	114
8	Superior Grocers	106
9	Harbor Health Care	99
10	Norm's Restaurants, LLC	97

== Government ==
United States presidential election results for Bellflower, California
Year	Republican		Democratic		Third party(ies)	
Year	No.	%	No.	%	No.	%
2000	5,275	36.22%	8,776	60.27%	511	3.51%
2004	8,127	42.43%	10,723	55.99%	302	1.58%
2008	7,221	33.05%	14,137	64.70%	491	2.25%
2012	6,205	29.73%	14,217	68.13%	446	2.14%
2016	5,700	25.09%	15,778	69.45%	1,239	5.45%
2020	9,006	30.43%	19,875	67.15%	716	2.42%
2024	9,505	37.78%	14,947	59.42%	704	2.80%

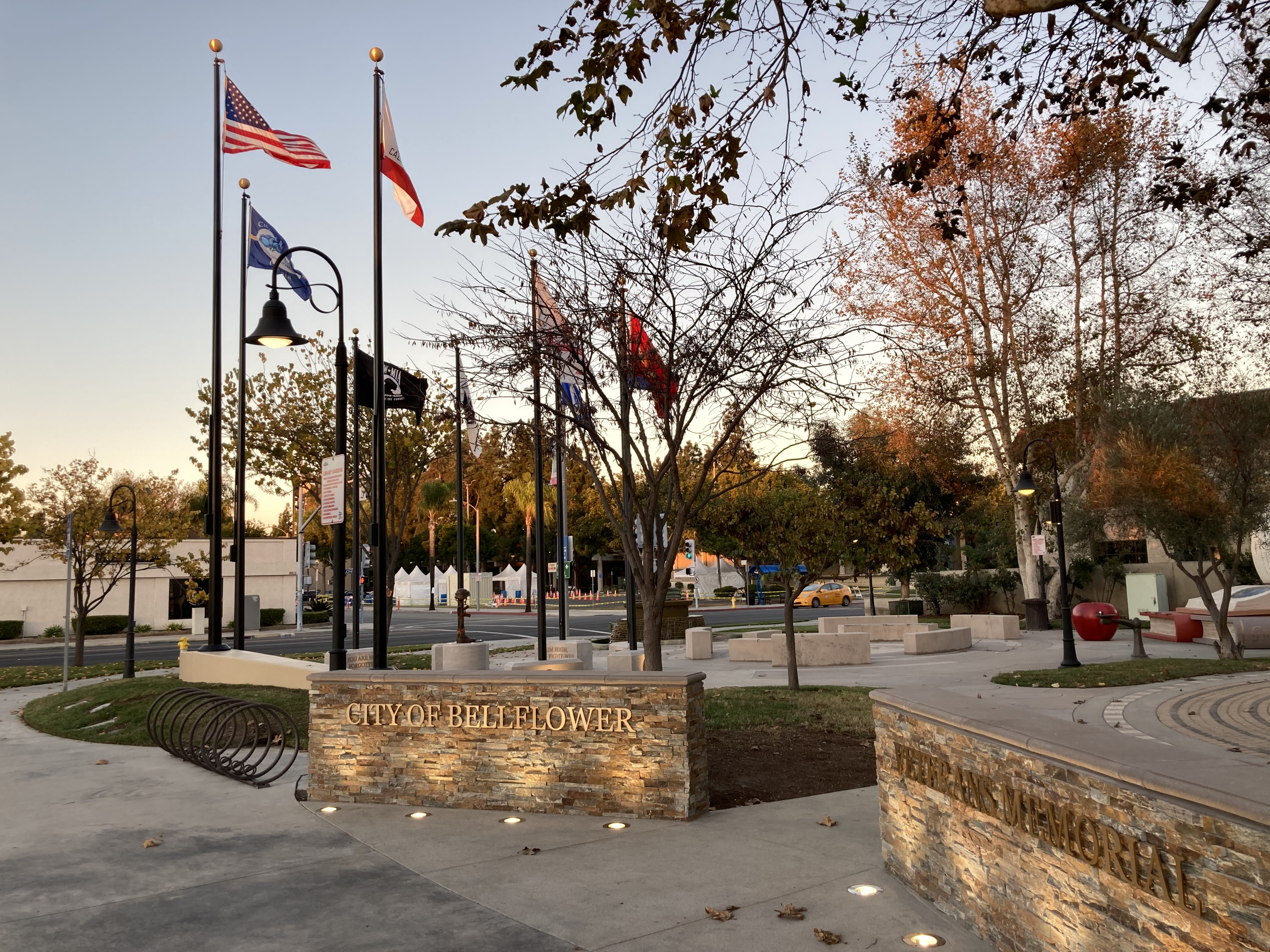
Veterans Memorial at Library Garden park

In the California State Legislature, Bellflower is in the 30th senatorial district, represented by Democrat Bob Archuleta. In the California State Assembly, it is in the 62nd Assembly district, represented by Democrat Jose Solache.

In the United States House of Representatives, Bellflower is mostly covered by the 42nd congressional district which is represented by Robert Garcia (D–Long Beach).

== Infrastructure ==
Fire protection in Bellflower is provided by the Los Angeles County Fire Department from stations 23 and 98. Ambulance transport is provided by Care Ambulance Service.

The Los Angeles County Sheriff's Department operates the Lakewood Station in Lakewood, serving Bellflower. In addition the sheriff's department operates the Bellflower Substation in Bellflower.

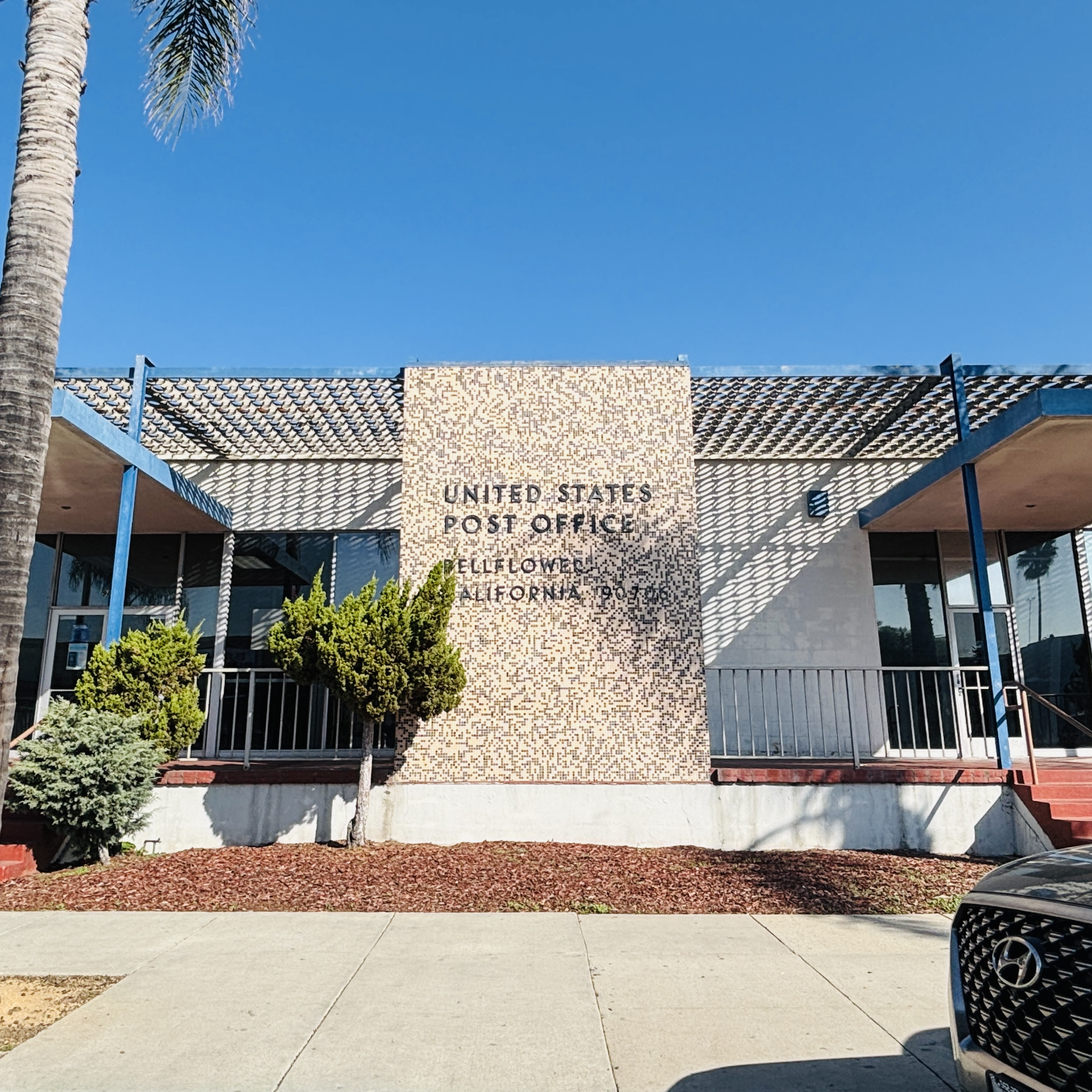
Bellflower post office

The United States Postal Service Bellflower Post Office is located at 9835 Flower Street. Los Cerritos Community News serves the city.

== Transportation ==
The Artesia Freeway (State Route 91) passes east–west through the southern portion of Bellflower, the San Gabriel River Freeway (Interstate 605) runs north–south just east of the city, and the Century Freeway (Interstate 105) runs east–west just north of the city.

Bellflower is served by bus service from Los Angeles County Metropolitan Transportation Authority (MTA) and Long Beach Transit. The city also operates Bellflower Bus, a fixed-route local bus.

Los Angeles Metro Rail is planned to reach Bellflower station, a former Pacific Electric station, via the Southeast Gateway Line around 2035.

== Education ==
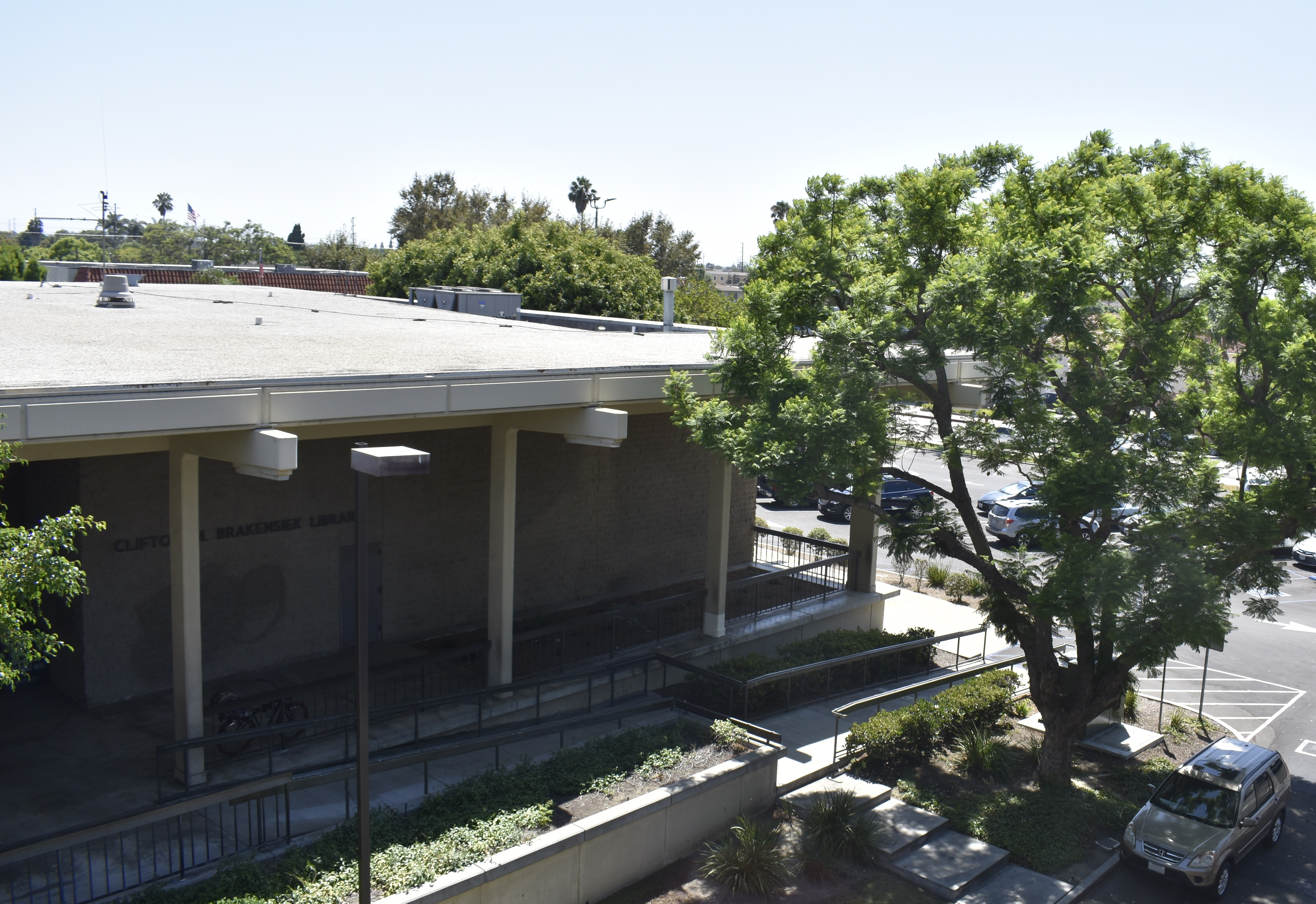
Clifton M. Brakensiek Library

Most of Bellflower is within the Bellflower Unified School District. Some of Bellflower is in the Downey Unified School District and some of it is in the Paramount Unified School District. BUSD has two secondary schools in Bellflower: Bellflower High School and Somerset High School.

St. John Bosco High School, and Valley Christian Elementary both privately run, are also in Bellflower.

The Clifton M. Brakensiek Library is a branch of the County of Los Angeles Public Library.

== Notable people ==
- Danny Barber (born 1971), indoor/outdoor soccer player
- Anthony Brown (born 1992), basketball player in the Israeli Basketball Premier League
- Chris Carter, television and film producer, director and writer, creator of The X-Files
- Zach Charbonnet, NFL player.
- Misty Copeland, principal ballet dancer from American Ballet Theatre
- Ronnie Correy, motorcycle speedway rider
- Savannah DeMelo, soccer player for Racing Louisville and the United States national team
- Suleman octuplets, a set of octuplets born to Nadya Suleman
- Aaron Embry, songwriter and record producer
- Kirk Fletcher, electric blues guitarist, singer and songwriter, was born in Bellflower in 1975.
- Nomar Garciaparra, Major League Baseball shortstop, 6-time All-Star, 2-time batting champion, TV commentator; attended St. John Bosco High School
- A.J. Gass, former Canadian Football League player
- Anthony Gose, Major League Baseball pitcher, currently in the Cleveland Guardians organization
- Shauna Grant (1963–1984), screen name of pornographic actress Colleen Applegate, was born here
- Don Hahn, producer of Disney's "Beauty and the Beast" and "The Lion King"
- Trevor Hoffman, Major League Baseball relief pitcher, 7-time All-Star, born in Bellflower
- Malcolm David Kelley American rapper and Singer songwriter
- Jeff Kent, Major League Baseball second baseman, 5-time All-Star, 2000 National League MVP; born in Bellflower
- Vanessa Lam, figure skater, 2012 Junior Grand Prix finalist
- Darryll Lewis, former National Football League player
- Adam Liberatore, Major League Baseball relief pitcher with Los Angeles Dodgers
- Evan Longoria, Major League Baseball third baseman, 3-time All-Star graduated from St. John Bosco High School in 2003
- Kimberly McCullough, actress, General Hospital
- Wendi McLendon-Covey, actress, appeared in film Bridesmaids, was born in Bellflower
- Bob Meusel, an MLB baseball player that played for the New York Yankees and the Cincinnati Reds.
- Art Olivier, mayor (1998-1999) and Libertarian politician
- Valentino Pascucci, professional baseball player, 2004–11
- Jerry Quarry, heavyweight boxer, former #1 ranked contender
- Carlos Quentin, Major League Baseball outfielder, 2-time All-Star
- Sergio Santos, Major League Baseball relief pitcher 2010-15
- Brandon Sermons, professional football player
- Anneliese van der Pol, actress; attended Ramona Elementary School and Bellflower High School
- Matt Welch, blogger and journalist
- Derrick Williams, professional basketball player with Maccabi Tel Aviv of the Israeli Basketball Premier League and the EuroLeague; formerly with five NBA teams, 2011 Pac-10 Player of the Year
- Ron Yary, professional football player in College and Pro Football Hall of Fame; graduated Bellflower High School in 1964

== See also ==
- List of cities in Los Angeles County, California
- List of cities and towns in California
