= 2015 Toronto Argonauts season =

CFL team season

- General manager: Jim Barker
- Head coach: Scott Milanovich
- Home stadium: Rogers Centre (5 games); Tim Hortons Field (2 games); TD Place Stadium (1 game); SMS Equipment Stadium (1 game)

Results
- Record: 10–8
- Division place: 3rd, East
- Playoffs: Lost East Semi-Final
- Team MOP: Trevor Harris
- Team MOC: Cleyon Laing
- Team MOR: Vidal Hazelton

Uniform

The 2015 Toronto Argonauts season was the 58th season for the team in the Canadian Football League (CFL) and their 143rd season overall. The Argonauts finished with a 10–8 record, but lost the East-Semi Final to the Hamilton Tiger-Cats.

The Argonauts spent much of the 2015 season as a traveling team due to a litany of schedule conflicts between the 2015 Pan American Games and the 2015 Toronto Blue Jays season; in the latter case, the Argonauts' attempt to backload their schedule with home games backfired when the Blue Jays unexpectedly made the playoffs and advanced to the American League Championship Series, forcing last-minute relocations for the Argonauts as the Blue Jays held priority on use of the Rogers Centre. For the third consecutive season, the Argonauts' home pre-season game was played at the University of Toronto's Varsity Stadium. The team played their regular season opener at SMS Equipment Stadium in Fort McMurray as the designated home team against the Edmonton Eskimos. This made the Argonauts the first CFL franchise to host regular season games in three different provinces (including New Brunswick for Touchdown Atlantic in 2010). In effect, the Argonauts played on the road for their first five games, with their home opener coming in week 7 against the Saskatchewan Roughriders, playing only 5 games in their host market during the regular season.

The team later had to shift their October 6 home game against Ottawa to TD Place Stadium, home of the Redblacks, and their October 17 and 23 home games were moved to Tim Hortons Field in Hamilton. If the Jays had advanced to the 2015 World Series, further Argonauts home games would have had to be relocated. The Argos did not fare well in the Hamilton "home" games; they lost both contests (knocking them out of contention to win the East division) and drew a combined attendance of 7,142.

The November 6 contest against Winnipeg (which drew 17,511) was their last game at Rogers Centre. Renovations to BMO Field were completed in time for the Argonauts to relocate to their new venue for the 2016 CFL season.

== Offseason ==
=== CFL draft ===
The 2015 CFL draft took place on May 12, 2015. The Argonauts had seven selections in the seven-round draft. They traded their sixth-round pick for Dwight Anderson and received a seventh-round pick for Josh Portis.

Round	Pick	Player	Position	School/Club team
1	3	Sean McEwen	OL	Calgary
2	12	Daryl Waud	DL	Western
3	21	Cameron Walker	DL	Guelph
4	30	Matt Norzil	WR	Laval
5	39	Dillon Campbell	RB	Wilfrid Laurier
7	55	Kevin Bradfield	WR	Toronto
7	56	Dan MacDonald	LS	Guelph

== Preseason ==
Week	Date	Kickoff	Opponent	Results		TV	Venue	Attendance	Summary
Week	Date	Kickoff	Opponent	Score	Record	TV	Venue	Attendance	Summary
A	Bye								
B	Tues, June 9	7:30 p.m. EDT	vs. Winnipeg Blue Bombers	L 27–34	0–1	None	Varsity Stadium	5,000	Recap
C	Thurs, June 18	7:30 p.m. EDT	at Montreal Alouettes	W 30–10	1–1	TSN2/RDS	Molson Stadium	16,325	Recap

# Games played with white uniforms.

== Regular season ==
=== Standings ===
East Division
Team	GP	W	L	PF	PA	Pts	
Ottawa Redblacks	18	12	6	464	454	24	Details
Hamilton Tiger-Cats	18	10	8	530	391	20	Details
Toronto Argonauts	18	10	8	438	499	20	Details
Montreal Alouettes	18	6	12	388	402	12	Details

=== Schedule ===
Win Loss Tie

Week	Date	Kickoff	Opponent	Results		TV	Venue	Attendance	Summary
Week	Date	Kickoff	Opponent	Score	Record	TV	Venue	Attendance	Summary
1	Sat, June 27	5:00 p.m. EDT	Edmonton Eskimos	W 26–11	1–0	TSN	SMS Equipment Stadium (in Fort McMurray)	4,900	Recap
2	Sun, July 5	3:30 p.m. EDT	@ Saskatchewan Roughriders	W 42–40 (2OT)	2–0	TSN/RDS2	Mosaic Stadium	31,907	Recap
3	Mon, July 13	9:00 p.m. EDT	@ Calgary Stampeders	L 20–25	2–1	TSN/RDS2	McMahon Stadium	26,741	Recap
4	Bye								
5	Fri, July 24	10:00 p.m. EDT	@ BC Lions	W 30–27	3–1	TSN/RDS2	BC Place	20,085	Recap
6	Mon, Aug 3	7:00 p.m. EDT	@ Hamilton Tiger-Cats	L 18–34	3–2	TSN/RDS2/ESPN2	Tim Hortons Field	24,135	Recap
7	Sat, Aug 8	7:00 p.m. EDT	Saskatchewan Roughriders	W 30–26	4–2	TSN	Rogers Centre	20,642	Recap
8	Fri, Aug 14	8:00 p.m. EDT	@ Winnipeg Blue Bombers	W 27–20	5–2	TSN	Investors Group Field	27,246	Recap
9	Sun, Aug 23	4:00 p.m. EDT	Ottawa Redblacks	W 30–24	6–2	TSN	Rogers Centre	14,748	Recap
10	Fri, Aug 28	9:00 p.m. EDT	@ Edmonton Eskimos	L 15–38	6–3	TSN/RDS/ESPN2	Commonwealth Stadium	31,573	Recap
11	Mon, Sept 7	1:00 p.m. EDT	@ Hamilton Tiger-Cats	L 12–42	6–4	TSN	Tim Hortons Field	24,390	Recap
12	Fri, Sept 11	7:30 p.m. EDT	Hamilton Tiger-Cats	L 27–35	6–5	TSN/RDS2	Rogers Centre	17,694	Recap
13	Bye								
14	Sat, Sept 26	7:00 p.m. EDT	@ Ottawa Redblacks	W 35–26	7–5	TSN/RDS2	TD Place Stadium	24,586	Recap
15	Bye								
16	Tues, Oct 6	7:30 p.m. EDT	Ottawa Redblacks	W 38–35	8–5	TSN/RDS2	TD Place Stadium^{1}	15,011	Recap
16	Mon, Oct 12	1:00 p.m. EDT	@ Montreal Alouettes	W 25–17	9–5	TSN/RDS	Molson Stadium	21,536	Recap
17	Sat, Oct 17	4:00 p.m. EDT	Calgary Stampeders	L 15–27	9–6	TSN	Tim Hortons Field^{1}	3,401	Recap
18	Fri, Oct 23	7:00 p.m. EDT	Montreal Alouettes	L 2–34	9–7	TSN/RDS2	Tim Hortons Field^{1}	3,741	Recap
19	Fri, Oct 30	7:00 p.m. EDT	BC Lions	L 25–27	9–8	TSN	Rogers Centre	14,236	Recap
20	Fri, Nov 6	7:30 p.m. EST	Winnipeg Blue Bombers	W 21–11	10–8	TSN/RDS2	Rogers Centre	17,511	Recap

^{1} Originally scheduled for the Rogers Centre but relocated due to schedule conflicts.

# Games played with colour uniforms.
# Games played with white uniforms.
# Games played with alternate uniforms.

== Post-season ==
=== Schedule ===
Game	Date	Kickoff	Opponent	Results		TV	Venue	Attendance	Summary
Game	Date	Kickoff	Opponent	Score	Record	TV	Venue	Attendance	Summary
East Semi-Final	Sun, Nov 15	1:00 p.m. EST	@ Hamilton Tiger-Cats	L 22–25	0–1	TSN/RDS	Tim Hortons Field	24,029	Recap

# Games played with white uniforms.

== Roster ==
2015 Toronto Argonauts final roster
Quarterbacks: 7 Trevor Harris; 6 Adrian McPherson; 15 Ricky Ray; Running backs: 43 Alexandre Dupuis; 45 Brendan Gillanders; 44 Chad Kackert; 3 Brandon Whitaker; Receivers: 11 Natey Adjei; 80 Phil Bates; 86 Kevin Bradfield; 1 Anthony Coombs; 21 Vidal Hazelton; 2 Chad Owens; 85 Diontae Spencer; 88 Dave Stala P/K	Offensive linemen: 65 Bruce Campbell T; 57 Tyler Holmes G; 67 Jeff Keeping C; 62 Scott Mitchell G/C; 52 Wayne Smith G; 62 Greg Van Roten T/G/C; 54 Chris Van Zeyl T; Defensive linemen: 94 Euclid Cummings DT; 95 Ricky Foley DE; 90 Cleyon Laing DT; 91 Tristan Okpalaugo DE; 75 Cameron Walker DE; 99 Daryl Waud DT; 93 Martin Wright DE	Linebackers: 27 Cory Greenwood; 28 Brandon Isaac; 53 Greg Jones; 48 Thomas Miles; 36 Brian Rolle; 47 James Yurichuk; Defensive backs: 23 Vince Agnew; 39 Matt Black; 5 Jermaine Gabriel; 25 Isaiah Green; 30 Travis Hawkins; 24 A. J. Jefferson; 9 Akwasi Owusu-Ansah	Special teams: 17 Justin Palardy K/P; 58 Jake Reinhart LS; 34 Swayze Waters P/K; Reserve roster: 81 Tori Gurley WR; 61 Jarriel King T; Practice roster: 33 Detrick Bonner LB; 69 Joe Circelli G; 16 Cody Fajardo QB; 20 Henry Josey RB; 56 Jeraill McCuller T; 35 Kevin Rutland DB; 26 Branden Smith DB; 38 Jonathan Truman LB; 37 Edward Whitley LB; 41 Jerod Zaleski LS	Injured list: 14 Anthony Alix P/K; 32 Andre Durie SB; 13 Kevin Elliott SB; 18 Jarred Fayson SB; 66 Fou Fonoti G; 8 Shane Herbert DB; 10 Logan Kilgore QB; 61 Jarriel King T; 87 Zander Robinson SB; 59 Matt Sewell T/G; 89 Kenny Shaw SB; 19 Devin Smith DB; 29 Curtis Steele RB; 40 Herve Tonye-Tonye LB; 97 Jason Vega DE; 4 Martez Wilson DE; Suspended: 69 Branndon Braxton T; 98 Tracy Robertson DT; 12 Brandon Underwood DB; Italics indicate international player Transactions (argonauts.ca); Transactions (cfl.ca)

== Coaching staff ==
2015 Toronto Argonauts staff
Front Office and Support staff: Owner – David Braley; President and ceo – Chris Rudge; Vice-Chair – Michael Clemons; General manager – Jim Barker; Director of football operations – Ian Sanderson; Director of player personnel – Chris Rossetti; US scouting coordinator – Demetri Betzios; Consultant, Football Operations – Nick Volpe; Equipment manager – Danny Webb; Assistant equipment manager – Tom Bryce; Head athletic therapist – Scott Shannon; Assistant athletic therapist – Josh Shewell; Head coaches: Head coach – Scott Milanovich; Offensive coaches: Offensive coordinator – Marcus Brady; Running backs – Anthony Ierullo; Receivers – Jaime Elizondo; Offensive line / assistant head coach – Jonathan Himebauch; Assistant offensive line – Mike Preston	Defensive coaches: Defensive coordinator – Casey Creehan; Inside linebackers – Peter Kuharchek; Outside linebackers – D.J. Wingate; Defensive backs – Jordan Younger; Special teams coaches: Special teams coordinator – Scott Downing; Assistant special teams – Mike Preston; → Coaching staff
