= Éric Lapointe =

Éric Lapointe may refer to:

- Éric Lapointe (Canadian football), running back in the Canadian Football League
- Éric Lapointe (singer), francophone singer from Quebec
