= Logan Kilgore =

American gridiron football player (born 1990)

Denver Broncos
- Title: Quarterbacks coach

Personal information
- Born: May 24, 1990 (age 36); Rocklin, California, U.S.
- Listed height: 6 ft 2 in (1.88 m)
- Listed weight: 213 lb (97 kg)

Career information
- Position: Quarterback
- High school: Jesuit (Carmichael, California)
- College: Bakersfield (2008–2009); Middle Tennessee State (2010–2013)
- NFL draft: 2014: undrafted

Career history

Playing
- New Orleans Saints (2014)*; Toronto Argonauts (2015–2017); Hamilton Tiger Cats (2017); Edmonton Eskimos (2019)
- * Offseason or practice squad member only

Coaching
- Bakersfield (2018) Quarterbacks coach & passing game coordinator; Arkansas State (2021) Offensive analyst; Isidore Newman HS (LA) (2022) Offensive coordinator & quarterbacks coach; Denver Broncos (2023–present); Offensive quality control coach (2023–2025); Quarterbacks coach (2026–present)

Career CFL statistics
- Passing attempts: 288
- Passing completions: 177
- Completion percentage: 61.4%
- TD–INT: 11–19
- Passing yards: 2,010
- Stats at CFL.ca

Logan Kilgore (born May 24, 1990) is an American professional football coach and former quarterback who is the quarterbacks coach for the Denver Broncos of the National Football League (NFL). Kilgore made his professional debut in 2016 for the Toronto Argonauts and remained with the Argonauts until 2017. He also spent a year each with the Hamilton Tiger Cats and Edmonton Eskimos. After ending his CFL career in 2019, Kilgore accumulated 2,010 yards and 11 touchdowns.

Before joining the CFL, Kilgore had 2,512 passing yards and 22 touchdowns while on the Bakersfield College football team in 2008. After transferring to Middle Tennessee the following year, Kilgore continued his football career with the Middle Tennessee Blue Raiders football team from 2010 to 2013. Following his passing yards season records for Middle Tennessee from 2011 to 2013, Kilgore had a career total of 8,059 offensive yards and 57 touchdowns with the Blue Raiders. He also played at the 2013 Armed Forces Bowl with Middle Tennessee. After his playing career, Kilgore was an assistant coach for the Arkansas State Red Wolves football team in 2021.

== Early life and college career ==
On May 24, 1990, Kilgore was born in Rocklin, California. After graduating from Jesuit High School, Kilgore went to Bakersfield College in 2009. At Bakersfield, he threw for 2,512 yards and 22 touchdowns. Kilgore was named the Northern Conference Offensive Player of the Year at Bakersfield College in 2009. He then transferred to Middle Tennessee in 2010, where he began playing for the Middle Tennessee Blue Raiders football team.

During his time with the Blue Raiders from 2010 to 2013, Kilgore was the first Blue Raider to have accumulated 2,000 yards in three consecutive seasons. At the 2013 Armed Forces Bowl, Kilgore and Middle Tennessee were defeated by the Navy Midshipmen. As a passer, Kilgore had 53 touchdowns and 7,489 passing yards during his career. With his combined statistics, Kilgore had a total of 8,059 offensive yards and 57 touchdowns. Kilgore held the passing yards season record for Middle Tennessee from 2011 to 2013.

== Professional career ==
Pre-draft measurables
Height	Weight	Arm length	Hand span	Wingspan	40-yard dash	10-yard split	20-yard split	20-yard shuttle	Three-cone drill	Vertical jump	Broad jump
6 ft 1 3/4 in (1.87 m)	213 lb (97 kg)	33 1/8 in (0.84 m)	10 1/4 in (0.26 m)	6 ft 3 3/4 in (1.92 m)	4.89 s	1.72 s	2.79 s	4.26 s	6.99 s	31.0 in (0.79 m)	9 ft 0 in (2.74 m)
All values from Pro Day

After going undrafted in the 2014 NFL draft Kilgore was signed to the New Orleans Saints as a free agent in 2014. He played at the Saints's training camp and was cut from the team in September 2014.

Kilgore signed with the Toronto Argonauts of the Canadian Football League (CFL) as was a member of their practice roster for the 2015 season. The following year, Kilgore became the Argos's starting quarterback after Ricky Ray was injured. Kilgore played in seven games, starting three, during the 2016 season, completing 55.3% of his passes for 728 yards and two touchdowns with 10 interceptions. Kilgore's time for the Argos ended in April 2017 when he was released from the team.

A few months later, Kilgore was signed to the Hamilton Tiger Cats in June 2017, but was subsequently released in August 2017.

In 2019, Kilgore joined the Edmonton Eskimos after not playing in the 2018 CFL season. Kilgore's first game with the Eskimos was a pre-season game during the 2019 CFL season, where he scored two touchdowns. Starting quarterback Trevor Harris missed the Eskimos Week 15 game due to an injury, which elevated Kilgore into the starting role. Despite a furious comeback attempt the Eskimos fell short losing 30–27 on a last second field goal. Kilgore then lead the Eskimos to a 21–16 victory over the Ottawa Redblacks in Week 16, before falling 42–12 to the Hamilton Tiger-Cats the following week.

== Coaching career ==
In 2021, Kilgore ended his playing career to become a coach with the Arkansas State Red Wolves football team. With Arkansas State, Kilgore was an assistant football coach for the offensive team. The following year, the Nashville Post said Kilgore will become both a quarterbacks coach and offensive coordinator for the Isidore Newman School. In 2023, Kilgore was named tight ends coach at Arkansas State, rejoining Butch Jones and his staff in Jonesboro.

After previously committing to Arkansas State, Kilgore joined the Denver Broncos as an offensive quality control coach on March 25, 2023. On February 2, 2026, Kilgore was promoted to serve as the Broncos' quarterbacks coach.
