= Rick Worman =

American gridiron football player and coach (born 1963)

Profile
- Position: Quarterback

Personal information
- Born: October 21, 1963 (age 63); Saratoga, California, U.S.
- Listed height: 6 ft 2 in (1.88 m)
- Listed weight: 200 lb (91 kg)

Career information
- High school: Saratoga
- College: Eastern Washington

Career history

Playing
- 1986–1988: Calgary Stampeders
- 1988–1989: Edmonton Eskimos
- 1990: Calgary Stampeders
- 1991: Saskatchewan Roughriders

Coaching
- 2001: Winnipeg Blue Bombers (OC)
- 2002: Fresno Frenzy
- 2007: Edmonton Eskimos (QB)
- 2008–2009: Edmonton Eskimos (OC/QB)
- 2011: Hamilton Tiger-Cats (RB)
- 2013: Mississippi Valley State (QB)
- 2014: Montreal Alouettes (OC)
- 2015: Mahoning Valley Brawlers (HC)
- 2016: Wilmington College (OC)
- 2017: Dixie State (TE)

Rick Worman (born October 21, 1963) is an American former football quarterback and coach. He played college football at Eastern Washington University. He then played for the Calgary Stampeders, Edmonton Eskimos and Saskatchewan Roughriders of the Canadian Football League. In 2015, Worman was hired as the head coach of the Mahoning Valley Brawlers of the Fall Experimental Football League but the team's 2015 season was canceled before it began.

CFL quarterback Ricky Ray credits Worman for getting him a tryout with the Edmonton Eskimos, while he was Ray's coach with the Fresno Frenzy.
