= Charles Alston (gridiron football) =

American gridiron football player (born 1978)

Profile
- Position: Defensive end

Personal information
- Born: June 8, 1978 (age 48); Washington, DC
- Listed height: 6 ft 5 in (1.96 m)
- Listed weight: 272 lb (123 kg)

Career information
- High school: Central HS
- College: Independence CC/ Bowie State

Career history
- 2003: Dallas Cowboys*
- 2003=2004: Atlanta Falcons*
- 2004: Amsterdam Admirals
- 2004: Tampa Bay Buccaneers*
- 2005–2007: Edmonton Eskimos
- 2008: Kansas City Brigade
- * Offseason or practice squad member only

Awards and highlights
- 93rd Grey Cup champion

Charles Alston (born June 8, 1978) is a former professional gridiron football player who was a defensive end for the Edmonton Eskimos of the Canadian Football League (CFL). Alston played college football and college basketball at Bowie State University, becoming the first NCAA player to play both a football and basketball game in the same day. In his first of two years with the Bulldogs, Alston was named to the All-Conference football team in his role as an offensive lineman. He later led the Bulldogs in his second year as the team captain. From 2003 to 2004, Alston attempted to break into the National Football League (NFL), spending time with three different teams in the preseason or as a practice squad player. He never played a regular season game in the NFL.

Alston joined the Edmonton Eskimos of the CFL in 2005, remaining with the team for three years. He played in 22 regular season games, recording 37 tackles, five sacks, and four forced fumbles. In the 93rd Grey Cup, Alston sacked the opposing quarterback in overtime, leading to a scoreless drive for the Montreal Alouettes and a 38–35 win for the Eskimos. Alston had several stints as a starting player for the Eskimos, but his role as a starter was never consistent, partially due to injuries. He was released by the Eskimos after the 2007 season.

== Early career ==
Alston attended Central High School in Washington, D.C. While a student at Central, Alston received accolades as both a high school football and high school basketball player. On the football team, Alston played as an offensive lineman and was selected for the 1995 All-County team as a junior. In the same academic year, Alston played as a center in basketball and was selected to the All-County second-team. Alston later studied at Marshall University before being recruited to the Bowie State Bulldogs of Bowie State University in 2001.

At Bowie State, Alston continued to play both football and basketball. Due to the September 11 attacks, the final football game of the Bulldogs' season was delayed to the same day as the first game of the basketball season. Alston played in both, becoming the first college athlete to play in both an NCAA football and basketball game in the same day. In November 2001, Alston was named to the Central Intercollegiate Athletic Association (CIAA) All-Conference team.

In 2002, Alston was named a pre-season Division II All-American and was also named as a team captain for Bowie State. Alston made a tackle for a loss on the final play of a post-season game against the Virginia State Trojans, resulting in the Bulldogs receiving the CIAA East Division title. The Bulldogs lost to the Fayetteville State Broncos in the CIAA title game. While the Bulldogs were invited to play in the Pioneer Bowl against the Tuskegee Golden Tigers, the bowl game was later cancelled due to funding issues. Alston finished the regular season in 2002 with over 60 tackles.

== Professional career ==
=== NFL career ===
Alston was eligible for the 2003 NFL draft but went undrafted. He was later signed by the Dallas Cowboys of the National Football League. He remained with the Cowboys through training camp but was cut in the preseason. Alston later tried out for the San Francisco 49ers but wasn't signed by the team.

The Atlanta Falcons signed Alston immediately after the end of the 2003 season and allocated him to the Amsterdam Admirals of NFL Europe. He found some success with the Admirals, being named the NFL Europe Defensive Player of the Week in May after recording four tackles and two sacks in a single game. In June, he also returned a fumble for a touchdown in a win against the Rhein Fire. Alston competed for a spot on the Falcons roster in training camp, but he was cut from the team in early September before the start of the 2004 regular season.

Alston spent four weeks on the practice squad of the Tampa Bay Buccaneers in October and November 2004. He worked out for the Washington Redskins in December 2004 but wasn't signed.

=== Edmonton Eskimos ===
The Edmonton Eskimos of the Canadian Football League signed Alston during the 2005 offseason. After making the active roster, Alston made his CFL debut on June 24, 2005, against the Ottawa Renegades. He was removed from the lineup the following week and later reported to have an undisclosed injury. Alston returned to the lineup and made his first career start in October, when he forced a fumble from Toronto Argonauts running back John Avery. The Eskimos continued to move Alston in and out of the lineup, and he played in one more regular season game for a total of three in his rookie season. Alston won "Best Lineman" honors in the West final win against the BC Lions, where he recorded seven tackles, a sack, and a pass knockdown. Among two tackles and two sacks in the 93rd Grey Cup, Alston sacked Montreal Alouettes quarterback Anthony Calvillo in overtime to take the Alouettes out of field goal range. This led to a 38–35 win for the Eskimos, making Alston a Grey Cup champion in his rookie season.

After his performance in the 2005 postseason, Alston was considered a "lock" to make the active roster. He started as a defensive end in the season opener. Alston's role on the team was more consistent in 2006, playing in 13 regular season games. In August, Alston sacked Saskatchewan Roughriders quarterback Kerry Joseph on their final drive, resulting in a 24–18 win. He was named lineman of the week later that month after recording two tackles and three sacks against the BC Lions. In early September, Alston recovered a Calgary Stampeders fumble for the only touchdown of his career. He finished the season with 21 tackles, four sacks, and two forced fumbles.

Before the 2007 season, Alston competed with Ron Warner and Jabari Issa for a starting role on the Eskimos. He made the active roster and originally split time with Warner and Robert Brown as a defensive lineman. In August, Alston replaced Adam Braidwood as the starting defensive end, but he was injured with a hip pointer in his first game in that role. He experienced nagging injury concerns for the remainder of the season. He finished the season with 11 tackles, a sack, and a forced fumble over six games. The Eskimos released Alston shortly after the end of the 2007. Head coach Danny Maciocia cited Alston's history of injuries as a factor in his release from the team.

=== Kansas City Brigade ===
In February 2008, Alston signed with the Kansas City Brigade of the Arena Football League, but he left the team later that same month.

== Personal life ==
Alston grew up with his mother while his father was incarcerated. Alston is married to Veronica Alston and has a son.
