= Jason Tucker =

American gridiron football player and coach (born 1976)

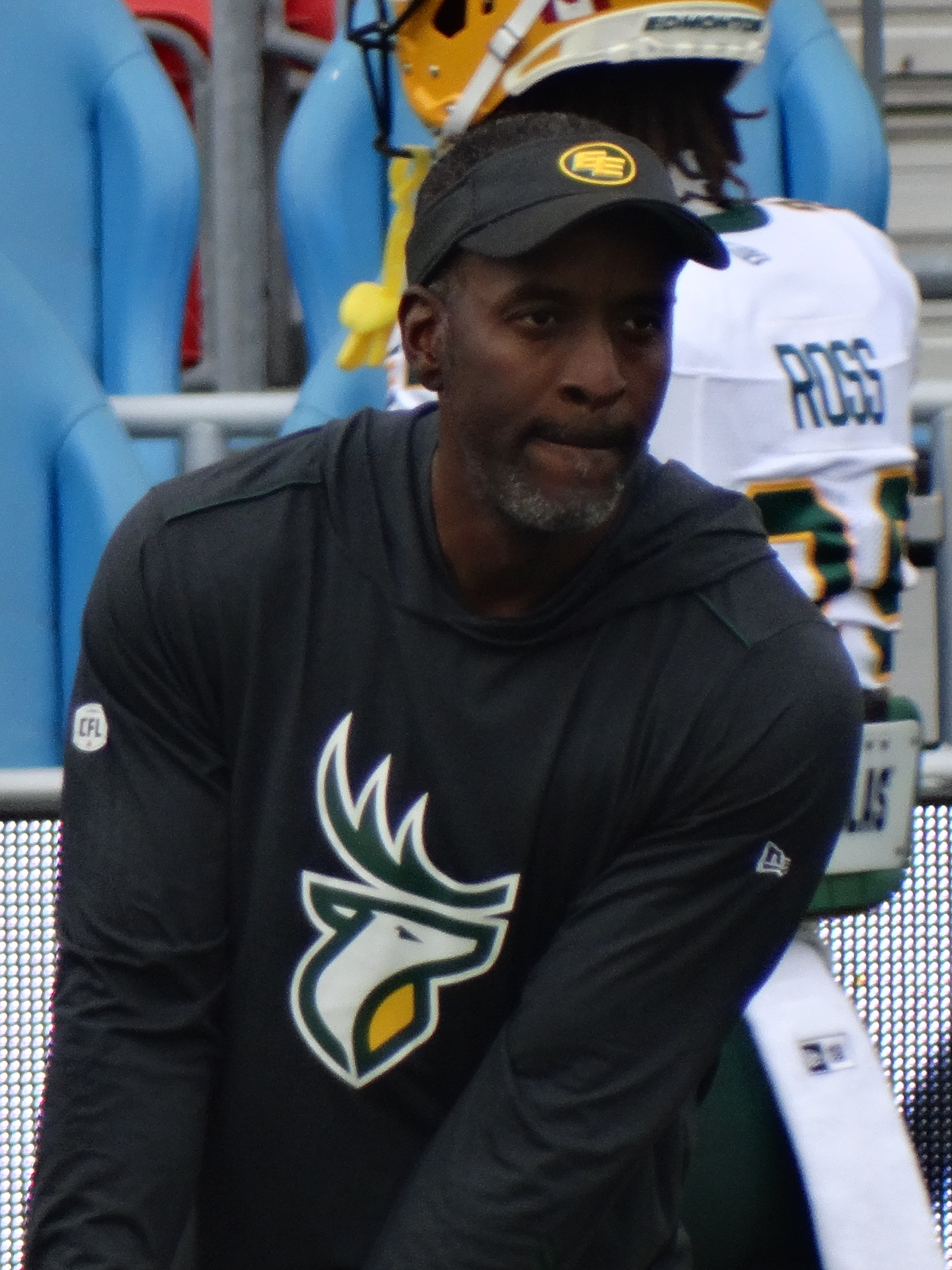
- Tucker with the Edmonton Elks in 2025

Edmonton Elks
- Title: Receivers coach

Personal information
- Born: June 24, 1976 (age 50); San Francisco, California, U.S.
- Listed height: 6 ft 2 in (1.88 m)
- Listed weight: 180 lb (82 kg)

Career information
- Position: Wide receiver (No. 87, 83)
- High school: Robinson (TX)
- College: TCU
- NFL draft: 1998: 6th round, 167th overall pick

Career history

Playing
- Cincinnati Bengals (1998)*; Green Bay Packers (1998)*; Rhein Fire (1999); Dallas Cowboys (1999–2000); Edmonton Eskimos (2002–2008)
- * Offseason or practice squad member only

Coaching
- Edmonton Eskimos (2009–2010) Wide receiver coach; Saskatchewan Roughriders (2012–2014) Wide receiver coach; Tennessee Titans (2015–2016) Asst. Wide receiver coach; Montreal Alouettes (2018–2019) Wide receiver coach; BC Lions (2020–2024) Wide receiver coach; Edmonton Elks (2025–present) Receivers coach

Awards and highlights
- 4× Grey Cup champion (2003, 2005, 2013, 2026); Grey Cup MVP (2003); 4× CFL All-Star (2002, 2004–2006); 4× CFL West All-Star (2002, 2004–2006)

Career NFL statistics
- Receptions: 36
- Receiving yards: 565
- Receiving touchdowns: 2
- Stats at Pro Football Reference
- Stats at CFL.ca

Jason Tucker (born June 24, 1976) is the receivers coach for the Edmonton Elks of the Canadian Football League (CFL). He is formerly a gridiron football wide receiver where he played for the Edmonton Eskimos of the CFL and the Dallas Cowboys in the National Football League (NFL). He played college football at Texas Christian University.

== Early life ==
Tucker attended Robinson High School, where he practiced football, basketball and track. He played on the freshman football team but made the varsity basketball and track team as a freshman.

In football, he was a two-way player as a wide receiver and defensive back. As a senior in 1993, he scored 2 touchdowns in the span of 30 seconds against the Troy Trojans. He was a two-time All-state selection, finishing with 81 receptions for 1,771 yards and 25 touchdowns.

In track, his best event was the long jump, in which he was a state finalist his junior and senior years. He competed in the 4 × 100 metres relay at the state finals in his senior year.

== College career ==
Tucker accepted a football scholarship from Texas Christian University. As a freshman, he was a backup wide receiver, tallying 8 receptions for 72 yards. As a sophomore, he was named a starter and played in 9 games, ranking second on the team with 31 receptions for 433 yards and one touchdown.

As a junior, he registered 39 receptions (tied for second on the team), 692 yards (led the team), a 17.7-yard average and 4 receiving touchdowns (led the team).

Better stats were expected for his senior year; however, he did not play after being suspended for unspecified off-field violations. He finished his college career with 78 receptions for 1,197 yards, a 15.3-yard average, and 5 touchdowns.

== Professional career ==
=== Cincinnati Bengals ===
Tucker was selected by the Cincinnati Bengals in the sixth round (167th overall) of the 1998 NFL draft. Despite missing the entire 1997 college season, Tucker continued to train on his own, as evidenced by his clocking a 4.48 second, 40 yard dash, and finishing in the top five in agility drills at the NFL Combine.

He played in the preseason opener against the New York Giants, catching one pass for six yards. After pulling his left hamstring in training camp, and reaching an injury settlement, he was placed on waivers on August 19.

=== Green Bay Packers ===
On October 28, 1998, he was signed to the Green Bay Packers' practice squad. He was released on December 16.

=== Dallas Cowboys ===
On January 7, 1999, he was signed as a free agent by the Dallas Cowboys. He was allocated to the Rhein Fire of NFL Europe, where he ranked second on the team behind Dialleo Burks, with 26 receptions for 454 yards and 3 touchdowns. He returned to the Cowboys and made the roster as the team's sixth wide receiver, one more than the usual number.

His first catch was a six-yarder, in week five against the Philadelphia Eagles, after Michael Irvin suffered his career-ending injury. By November he had moved up to third-string, after Wane McGarity suffered a dislocated shoulder. On December 5 against the New England Patriots, he was named a starter to replace Ernie Mills who had pulled a muscle while warming up.

Mills was supposed to return for the December 21st game against New Orleans Saints, but instead, Tucker got his fourth straight start and had his best game, becoming part of Cowboys lore. Playing at both wide receiver and kickoff returner, he produced one of the standout performances in team history, with a franchise record 331 combined net yards. His 203 kickoff return yards (six kicks for 22, 32, 34, 50, 35 and 30 yards) also set a franchise record, even though he had an apparent 97-yard return for a touchdown called back for a holding penalty. He also added 128 receiving yards and a touchdown on 7 catches.

The next week against the New York Giants, the Cowboys clinched a playoff spot behind 122 receiving yards from Tucker, including a 90-yard touchdown, a 79-yard opening kickoff return (plus a facemask penalty) and his 205 kickoff return yards (which broke his franchise record). His production earned him the NFC special teams player of the month for December.

He finished the season with 23 receptions for 439 yards, 2 touchdowns, 10 special teams tackles (tied for sixth on the team) and a 27.9-yard kickoff average, which ranked second in the NFL and fifth in team history.

In 2000, he underwent off-season surgery on both of his big toes, with the rehabilitation process extending into training camp. He also was limited with a groin injury. He set the team record with 51 kickoff returns in a single-season and his 1,099 kickoff return yards ranked second All-time. As a wide receiver he took a step back, posting 13 receptions for 126 yards and no touchdowns. On August 28, 2001, he was released to make room for wide receiver Darrin Chiaverini.

=== Edmonton Eskimos ===
In 2002, he was signed by the Edmonton Eskimos of the Canadian Football League's. In his first year as a Canadian Football League player, Tucker was the team's second-leading receiver behind Terry Vaughn, with 51 catches for 911 yards and 8 touchdowns.

In 2003, Tucker tallied 41 receptions (fourth on the team) for 744 yards (third on the team) and 9 touchdowns.. He was named the most valuable player of the 91st Grey Cup, with a 132-yard performance in the championship game.

In 2004, he broke the 1,000 yards receiving mark for the first time in his career, racking up 1,632 yards for the fourth-highest total in franchise history, while also making 67 receptions (second on the team) and 11 touchdowns.

In 2005, he was second on the team behind Derrell Mitchell with 89 receptions for 1,411 yards and 11 touchdowns, contributing to the team winning the 93rd Grey Cup. In 2006, he recorded 75 receptions (second on the team), 1,321 yards (led the team) and 12 touchdowns.

On July 25, 2008, Tucker was involved in a helmet-to-helmet hit with Hamilton Tiger-Cats defender Jykine Bradley that fractured his C6-C7 vertebrae. Although his spinal cord was not damaged, the injury would end his career.

== Coaching career ==
On January 28, 2009, Tucker announced his retirement as a football player and that he would join the Edmonton Eskimos coaching staff as their wide receivers coach.

On January 3, 2012, he joined the Saskatchewan Roughriders' coaching staff as their receivers coach. In 2015, he was named the Tennessee Titans' wide receiver assistant coach. In December 2017, Tucker was hired to the Montreal Alouettes coaching staff as the receivers coach. After two years with the Alouettes, Tucker was announced as the receivers coach for the BC Lions on January 6, 2020. He served in that capacity through to the 2024 season, but was not retained on the staff in 2025.

On January 10, 2025, the Edmonton Elks announced that Tucker was named the team's receivers coach.
