= Pacino Horne =

American gridiron football player (born 1983)

No. 4
- Position: Defensive back

Personal information
- Born: November 23, 1983 (age 42); Ypsilanti, Michigan, U.S.
- Listed height: 6 ft 0 in (1.83 m)
- Listed weight: 183 lb (83 kg)

Career information
- College: Central Michigan
- NFL draft: 2007: undrafted

Career history
- 2008: Detroit Lions*
- 2009: Detroit Lions*
- 2012: Bloomington Edge
- 2012: Toronto Argonauts
- 2013: Hamilton Tiger-Cats*
- * Offseason or practice squad member only

Awards and highlights
- Grey Cup champion (2012)
- Stats at CFL.ca (archive)

Pacino Horne (born November 23, 1983) is an American former professional football defensive back. He signed as a free agent with the Toronto Argonauts on May 30, 2012, and dressed for 14 games during the 2012 season. Horne was a member of the 100th Grey Cup winning team, recording a 25-yard interception return for a touchdown in that game. He also played college football for the Central Michigan Chippewas. On June 17, 2013, Horne was cut by the Argonauts.

On September 3, 2013, Horne signed a practice roster agreement with the Hamilton Tiger-Cats.

On September 5, 2013, Horne left the Ticats. "Pacino wasn't ready to commit completely to being here, wants to explore another potential opportunity," said head coach Kent Austin.
