= Chad Kackert =

American gridiron football player (born 1986)

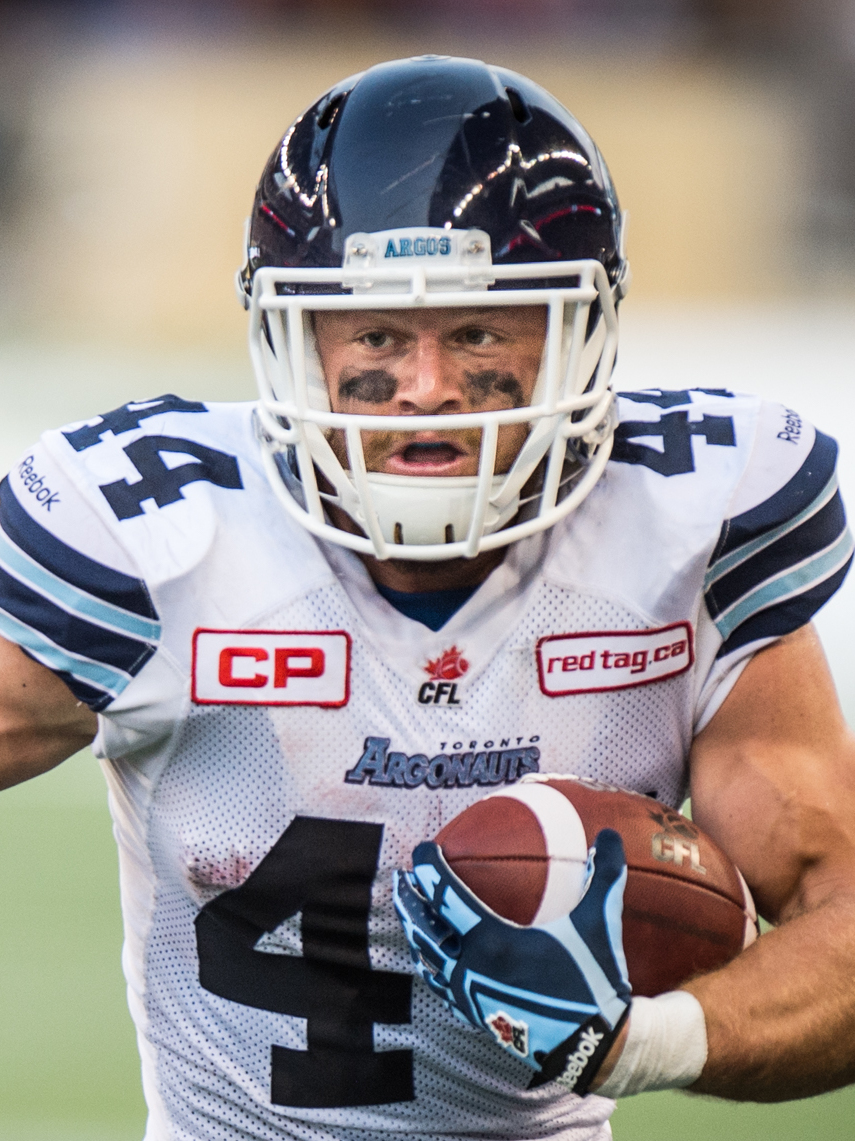
- Kackert with the Toronto Argonauts in 2015

Profile
- Position: Running back

Personal information
- Born: September 15, 1986 (age 40); Simi Valley, California, U.S.
- Listed height: 5 ft 8 in (1.73 m)
- Listed weight: 201 lb (91 kg)

Career information
- High school: Grace Brethren {Simi Valley}
- College: New Hampshire
- NFL draft: 2010: undrafted

Career history
- Jacksonville Jaguars (2010)*; Toronto Argonauts (2011–2016)
- * Offseason or practice squad member only

Awards and highlights
- Grey Cup champion (2012); Grey Cup's Most Valuable Player (2012)
- Stats at CFL.ca (archive)

Charles Kackert (born September 15, 1986) is an American former professional football running back who played for the Toronto Argonauts of the Canadian Football League (CFL). He played college football at New Hampshire. He was also a member of the Jacksonville Jaguars of the National Football League (NFL).

== Early life and college ==
Kackert played for Grace Brethren High School in Simi Valley, California, where his 3,437 yards rushing as a senior in 2004 rank #5 all-time in California high school football history. He was recruited by offensive coordinator Chip Kelly to play for the University of New Hampshire. While at UNH, he rushed for 2,587 career yards (#7 all-time at UNH) on 462 carries. As a senior in 2009, Kackert was All-CAA Second-team and earned the University's Bob Demers 12th Player Award after gaining 780 rushing yards and scoring 10 rushing TDs.

== Professional career ==
=== Combine ===
Kackert didn't perform at the NFL Combine (due to not getting an invite) but his performance at Jimmy Kibble's combine allowed him to get a tryout with the Jacksonville Jaguars which signed him to their practice squad.

=== Jacksonville Jaguars ===
Kackert signed with the Jacksonville Jaguars as an undrafted rookie following the 2010 NFL draft and participated in training camp, but was released prior to the start of the season.

=== Toronto Argonauts ===
Kackert signed with the Toronto Argonauts of the Canadian Football League on February 14, 2011. Partway through the 2012 CFL season the Argonauts released Cory Boyd, making Kackert the starting tailback. He would finish the season with 638 yards, 5 touchdowns and a rushing average of 6.3 yards per carry. On November 25, 2012, Kackert was named the Most Valuable Player of the 100th Grey Cup, where he helped the Argonauts defeat the Calgary Stampeders 35–22, rushing 20 times for 133 yards and adding 62 yards on 8 pass receptions. Despite rumours that he might try and sign with an NFL team, Kackert re-signed with the Argonauts at the start of free agency. During the 2013 season, Kackert suffered an ankle injury which eventually led to his retirement from football just prior to the start of the 2014 season. On the same date that he announced his retirement, Kackert was named the strength and conditioning coach for the Argonauts.

On September 27, 2014, Kackert came out of retirement, and was added to the Argonauts' practice roster. On Wednesday, October 15, 2014, the Toronto Argonauts released Kackert from the practice roster. He was released one week after suffering a right hamstring injury and was expected to miss the next 4–6 weeks. Upon his release, he re-assumed the role of Strength and Conditioning coach of the Toronto Argonauts.

On June 21, 2015, Kackert re-signed with the Argonauts and was added to their practice roster. He would ultimately play in 7 games, recording 235 rushing yards on 39 carries with no touchdowns, while also recording 10 catches for 76 receiving yards & no touchdowns.

In 2016, Kackert spent the entire season on the Argonauts' practice roster.

On May 26, 2017, Kackert announced his second and permanent retirement over Twitter.

=== Career statistics ===
Rushing		Regular season						Receiving
Year	Team	Games	Att.	Yards	Avg	Long	TD	Rec.	Yards	Avg	Long	TD
2011	TOR	7	57	349	6.1	24	5	4	58	14.5	53	1
2012	TOR	9	100	638	6.4	43	5	23	212	9.2	26	0
2013	TOR	8	71	480	6.8	57	3	23	184	8	48	1
2015	TOR	7	39	235	6	24	0	10	76	7.6	18	0
CFL totals		31	267	1,702	6.4	57	13	60	530	8.8	53	2
