= Ricky Foley =

Canadian gridiron football player (born 1982)

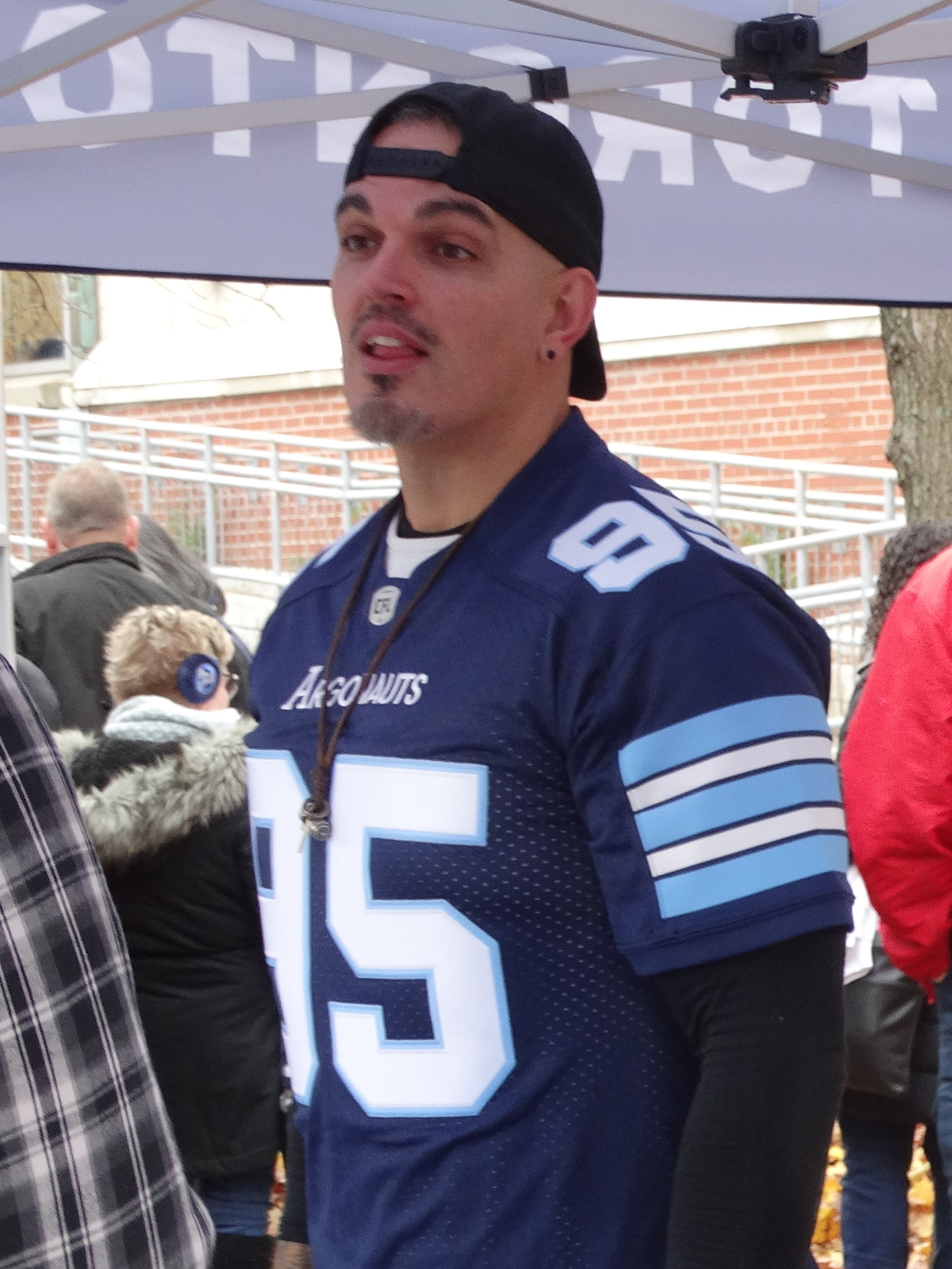
- Foley in 2022

No. 95, 9
- Position: Defensive end

Personal information
- Born: June 9, 1982 (age 44); Courtice, Ontario, Canada
- Listed height: 6 ft 2 in (1.88 m)
- Listed weight: 258 lb (117 kg)

Career information
- University: York
- CFL draft: 2006: 1st round, 4th overall pick

Career history
- Baltimore Ravens (2006)*; BC Lions (2006–2009); Seattle Seahawks (2010)*; New York Jets (2010)*; Toronto Argonauts (2010–2012); Saskatchewan Roughriders (2013–2014); Toronto Argonauts (2015–2016); BC Lions (2017)
- * Offseason or practice squad member only

Awards and highlights
- 3× Grey Cup champion (2006, 2012, 2013); CFL's Most Outstanding Canadian Award (2009); Dr. Beattie Martin Trophy (2009); Grey Cup's Most Valuable Canadian (2012)

Career CFL statistics
- Tackles: 396
- Sacks: 61
- Forced fumbles: 10
- Stats at CFL.ca

Ricky Foley (born June 9, 1982) is a Canadian former professional football defensive end who played in the Canadian Football League (CFL). He was selected by the BC Lions in the first round of the 2006 CFL draft. He is a three-time Grey Cup champion, having won in his rookie year in 2006 and also winning in 2012 and 2013. Foley won the CFL's Most Outstanding Canadian Award in 2009 and also the Grey Cup's Most Valuable Canadian award in 2012. He played CIS football for the York Lions.

Foley was also a member of the Baltimore Ravens, Seattle Seahawks and New York Jets of the National Football League, and the Toronto Argonauts and Saskatchewan Roughriders of the CFL.

== Early life ==
Foley was born in Courtice, Ontario Canada and was raised on a 200-acre farm near Toronto. His father was a farmer and growing up his family didn't have a lot of money. Foley and his family would have to fix things up for much of his youth. After Foley's brother left when he was 14, he was expected to take over farm duties for the family but started to play football, at Paul Dwyer High in Oshawa.

== University career ==
Foley played in college for York University. In his senior year, Foley was a Second team CIS All Canadian and during his college career with the Lions, he was twice named to ALL OUA honours.

== Professional career ==
=== Baltimore Ravens ===
Foley signed with the Baltimore Ravens on May 12, 2006. He was released on June 15, 2006.

=== BC Lions (first stint) ===
When he joined the BC Lions in 2006, Foley had served as a situational pass rusher but with the departure of Cam Wake following the 2008 BC Lions season, Foley earned the starting defensive end position. In 2009, Foley had his first career start at defensive end and subsequently started all 18 games that season, registering 51 defensive tackles, 12 quarterback sacks, and four tackles for a loss. He also had a total of two sacks in the Lions' two playoff games. At the end of the season, Foley won the CFL's Most Outstanding Canadian Award.

=== Seattle Seahawks ===
Foley signed with the Seattle Seahawks on February 13, 2010. He was waived on August 30.

=== New York Jets ===
On August 31, 2010, the New York Jets claimed Foley off waivers. Foley's tenure would be very brief as he was waived on September 3, 2010. Foley would be signed to the team's practice squad two days later only to be released from the squad on September 7, 2010.

=== Toronto Argonauts (first stint) ===
On September 14, 2010, Foley signed with the Toronto Argonauts of the Canadian Football League. His signing came amidst some controversy as the B.C. Lions had announced earlier in the day that they had agreed to terms with Foley. Foley was also interviewed that same morning by Vancouver radio station the Team 1040 where he discussed his return to the Lions. "When I chose B.C., it was like that's the team that I've won a Cup with, winning Canadian Player of the Year, leading the league in sacks, with my boys out there and the staff. It's where I know I've had success, and I love the city out there. They support the Lions so much out there." Lions head coach and general manager Wally Buono later confirmed that Foley had changed his mind and signed with the Argonauts instead of the Lions. "He's done an about face. We think the pressures from the family had a lot to do with it. We're not going to stand in the way if this is what he wants and we'll move on."

On November 25, 2012, Foley played in the 100th Grey Cup for the Argonauts who went on to win the Grey Cup championship. After the Grey Cup game, Foley was awarded the Dick Suderman Trophy as its "Most Valuable Canadian" player.

=== Saskatchewan Roughriders ===
Entering 2013 CFL free agency on February 15, 2013, Foley was one of the top free agents available to be signed. After being a free agent for ten days, Foley was signed by the Saskatchewan Roughriders on February 25, 2013. In his first season with the Roughriders Foley accumulated 45 tackles and 8 quarterback sacks: He also had a career high 4 fumble recoveries. To conclude the 2013 season the Riders won the 101st Grey Cup giving Foley his third Grey Cup in his career. Foley continued his strong play into the 2014 CFL season, tallying 54 tackles and 12 sacks. Foley was named the Saskatchewan Roughriders' Most Outstanding Canadian for the 2014 campaign. Following the season Foley signed a contract extension with the Roughriders. Ricky Foley was 32 years of age when he signed the contract extension.

=== Toronto Argonauts (second stint) ===
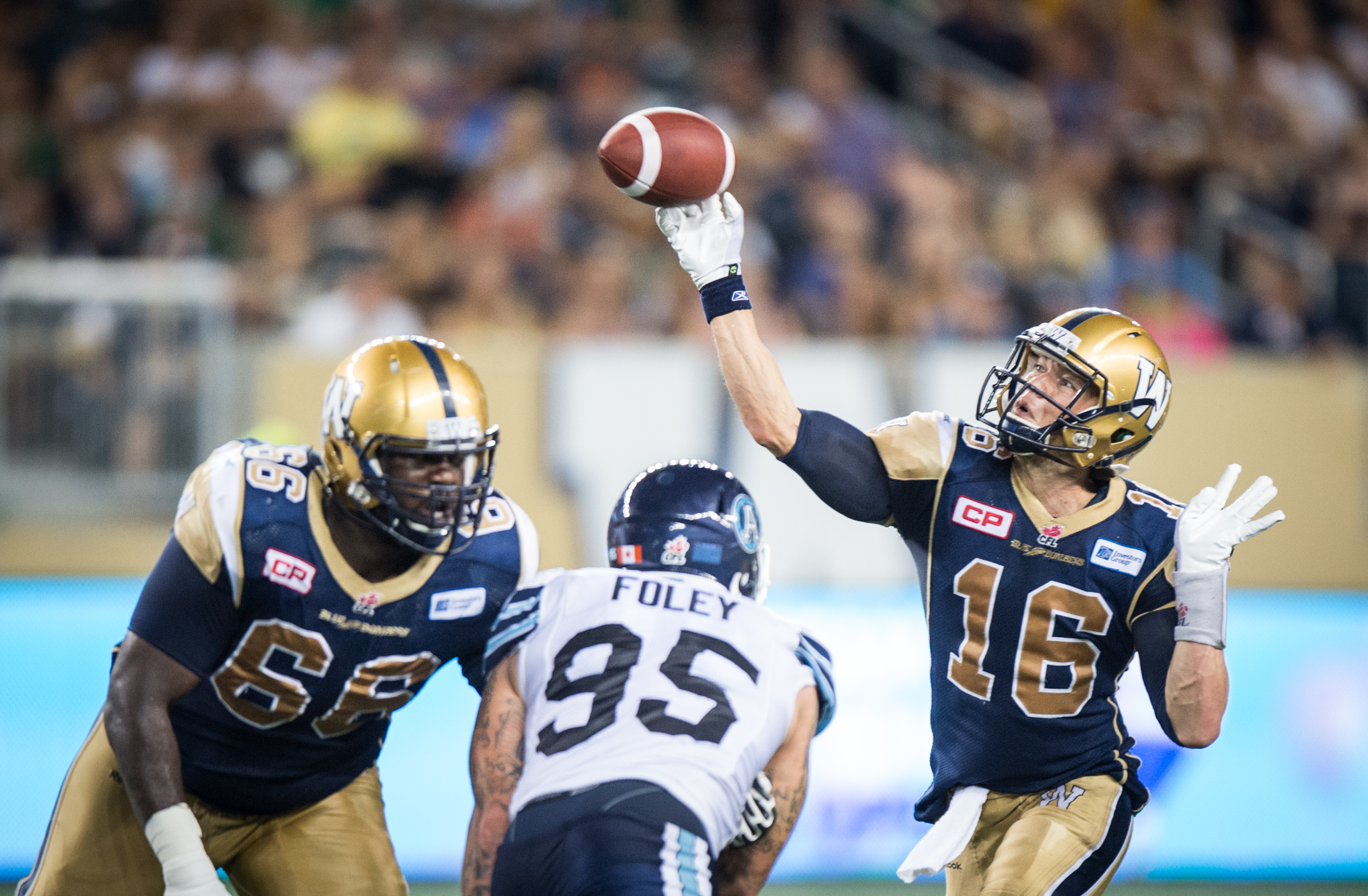
Foley pursuing Winnipeg quarterback Robert Marve as offensive lineman Stanley Bryant intervenes

On January 24, 2015, Foley was traded back to the Argonauts for LB Shea Emry. In his 10th season in the CFL Foley played in 16 games collecting 48 tackles 6 quarterback sacks and 1 forced fumble. To avoid becoming a free-agent in February 2016, Foley agreed to take a pay cut and resigned with the Argos in December 2015. Foley played in 14 games for the Argos in 2016, contributing 24 tackles and 4 quarterback sacks. On March 31, 2017, the Argos released Ricky Foley, one day before he was set to earn a roster bonus on April 1. Prior to his release the Argos requested that Foley restructure his contract for the upcoming season, but failure to do so resulted in his dismissal.

=== BC Lions (second stint) ===
On August 6, 2017, Foley signed with the Lions for a second tenure, with his contract carrying through to the end of the 2017 CFL season. He was, however, released by the organization in March 2018 following an unproductive 2017 Season.
