= Anthony Alix =

Canadian gridiron football player (born 1986)

No. 13
- Positions: Kicker, punter

Personal information
- Born: December 8, 1986 (age 39); Mont-Tremblant, Quebec, Canada
- Listed height: 6 ft 0 in (1.83 m)
- Listed weight: 187 lb (85 kg)

Career information
- University: St. Francis Xavier
- CFL draft: 2012: undrafted

Career history
- 2012: Toronto Argonauts
- 2015: Ottawa Redblacks
- 2015: Toronto Argonauts
- 2019: BC Lions*
- * Offseason or practice squad member only

Awards and highlights
- Grey Cup champion (2012)
- 'Stats at CFL.ca'Stats at CFL.ca (archive)

Anthony Alix (born December 8, 1986) is a Canadian former professional football placekicker and punter who played for three teams in the Canadian Football League (CFL).

== Early life ==
Alix played CIS football for the St. Francis Xavier X-Men.

== Professional football ==
=== Toronto Argonauts ===
Alix signed as a free agent with the Toronto Argonauts on June 2, 2012. Alix dressed in 3 games that season for the Argonauts, recording stats in 2 of the 3 games. In 2012, Alix made 2 of 3 field goals, punted 3 times for a total of 93 yards, 1 point after conversion, and 3 kickoffs for a total of 171 yards. The Argonauts would go on to win the 100th Grey Cup, though Alix did not dress for any of the team's playoff games. He was released by the Argonauts on June 17, 2013.

=== Ottawa RedBlacks ===
On May 30, 2015, Alix signed with the Ottawa Redblacks. In six games with the Redblacks, he punted 37 times for 1,569 yards for an average of 42.6 yards. Alix was released by the Redblacks on August 18, 2015.

=== Toronto Argonauts ===
On October 1, 2015, Alix was re-signed by the Argonauts. He played in two games for the Argos before being released in the following offseason.

=== BC Lions ===
On February 21, 2019, it was announced that Alix had signed with the BC Lions. However, he was released during training camp on June 9, 2019.
