= 93rd Grey Cup =

2005 Canadian Football championship game

Edmonton Eskimos	Montreal Alouettes
(11–7)	(10–8)
38	35
Head coach: Danny Maciocia	Head coach: Don Matthews
	1	2	3	4	OT	Total
Edmonton Eskimos	3	7	10	8	10	38
Montreal Alouettes	1	0	17	10	7	35
- Date: November 27, 2005
- Stadium: BC Place Stadium
- Location: Vancouver
- Most Valuable Player: Ricky Ray, QB (Eskimos)
- Most Valuable Canadian: Maven Maurer, (Note: Credited as Mike Maurer; The 93rd Grey Cup was played before Maurer came out as transgender and changed her name.) FB (Eskimos)
- National anthem: Jully Black
- Coin toss: Rt. Hon. Paul Martin
- Referee: Glen Johnson
- Halftime show: The Black Eyed Peas
- Attendance: 59,157

Broadcasters
- Network: CBC, RDS, CBCHD
- Announcers: (CBC) Steve Armitage, Darren Flutie, Greg Frers, Mark Lee, Chris Walby, Brian Williams
- Ratings: 4,031,000

The 93rd Grey Cup game was held on November 27, 2005, at B.C. Place Stadium in Vancouver, British Columbia, between the Edmonton Eskimos and the Montreal Alouettes, to decide the winner of the 2005 season of the Canadian Football League. The Eskimos prevailed over the Alouettes in a 38–35 overtime victory. It was the first time in 44 years that a Grey Cup went into overtime (it would happen again in 2016 and 2021). It was also the first Grey Cup to be presented in high-definition television.

== Festivities ==
The Grey Cup Parade was held the day before the game. Pamela Anderson served as Grand Marshal of the parade.

The Black Eyed Peas, who also performed during halftime of the Grey Cup game, appeared on scene and performed, marking the culmination of a large celebration to welcome the Grey Cup to British Columbia.

== Game summary ==
Edmonton Eskimos (38) – TDs, Ed Hervey, Tony Tompkins, Ricky Ray, Jason Tucker; FGs Sean Fleming (3); cons., Fleming (3); 2-point cons., Tucker (1).

Montreal Alouettes (35) – TDs, Éric Lapointe (2), Anthony Calvillo, Dave Stala; FGs Damon Duval (2); cons., Duval (4); singles, Duval (1).

First quarter
EDM—FG Fleming 18-yard field goal 8:03 3–0 EDM
MTL—Single Duval 56-yard kick went through end zone 0:18 3–1 EDM
Second quarter
EDM—TD Hervey 9-yard pass from Ray (Fleming convert) 11:11 10–1 EDM
Third quarter
MTL—TD Lapointe 1-yard run (Duval convert) 11:14 10–8 EDM
EDM—FG Fleming 35-yard field goal 4:04 13–8 EDM
MTL—TD Lapointe 1-yard run (Duval convert) 3:03 15–13 MTL
MTL—FG Duval 13-yard field goal 1:16 18–13 MTL
EDM—TD Tompkins 96-yard kickoff return (Fleming convert) 1:03 20–18 EDM
Fourth quarter
MTL—TD Calvillo 1-yard run (Duval convert) 9:34 25–20 MTL
EDM—TD Ray 1-yard run (Ray to Tucker – two point convert) 1:03 28–25 EDM
MTL—FG Duval 28-yard field goal 0:00 28–28
Overtime
MTL—TD Stala 30-yard pass from Calvillo (Duval convert) 35–28 MTL
EDM—TD Tucker 11-yard pass from Ray (Fleming convert) 35–35
EDM—FG Fleming 36-yard field goal 38–35 EDM

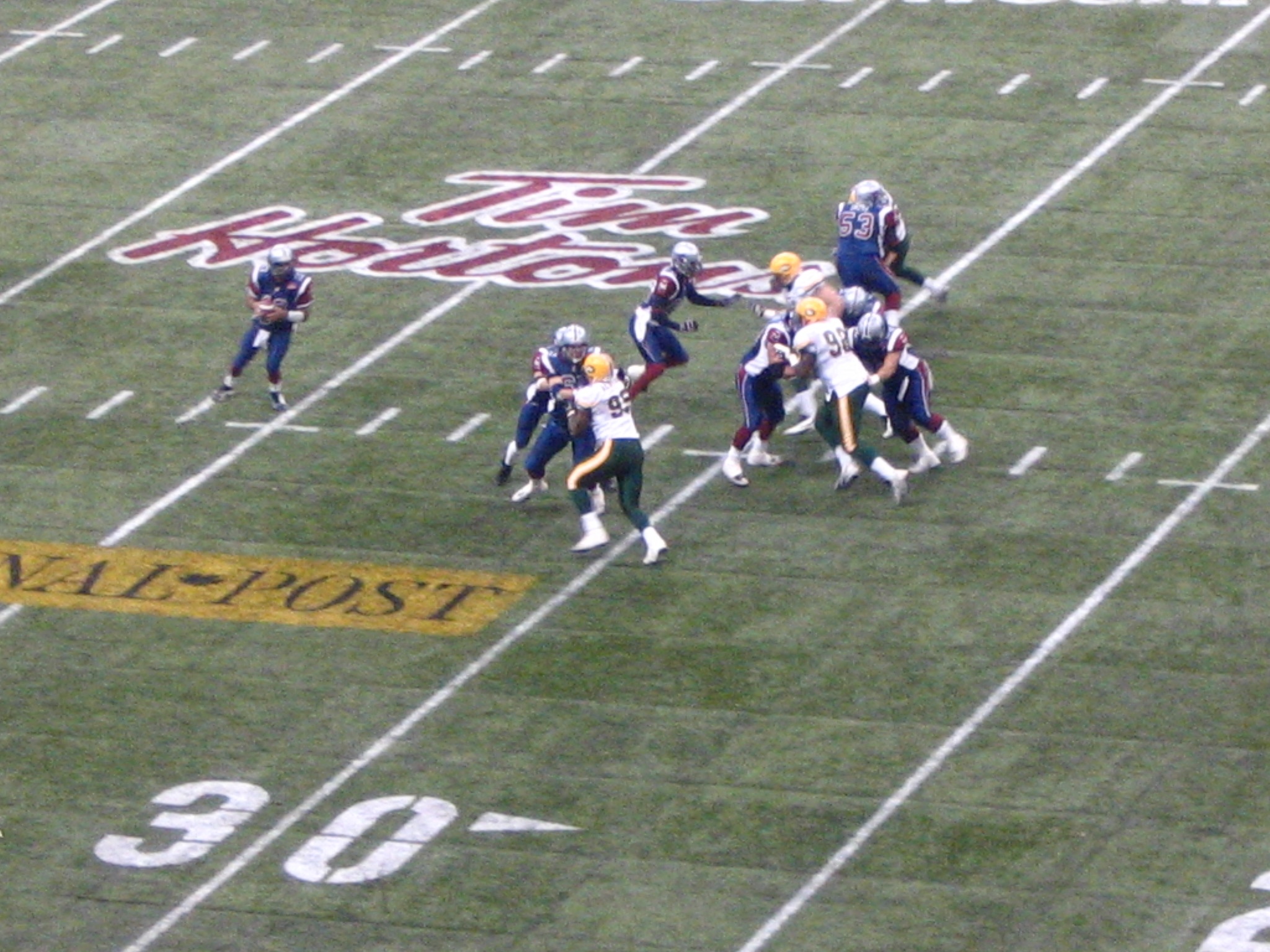
Montreal Alouettes quarterback Anthony Calvillo looks down field with the ball during the 93rd Grey Cup game.

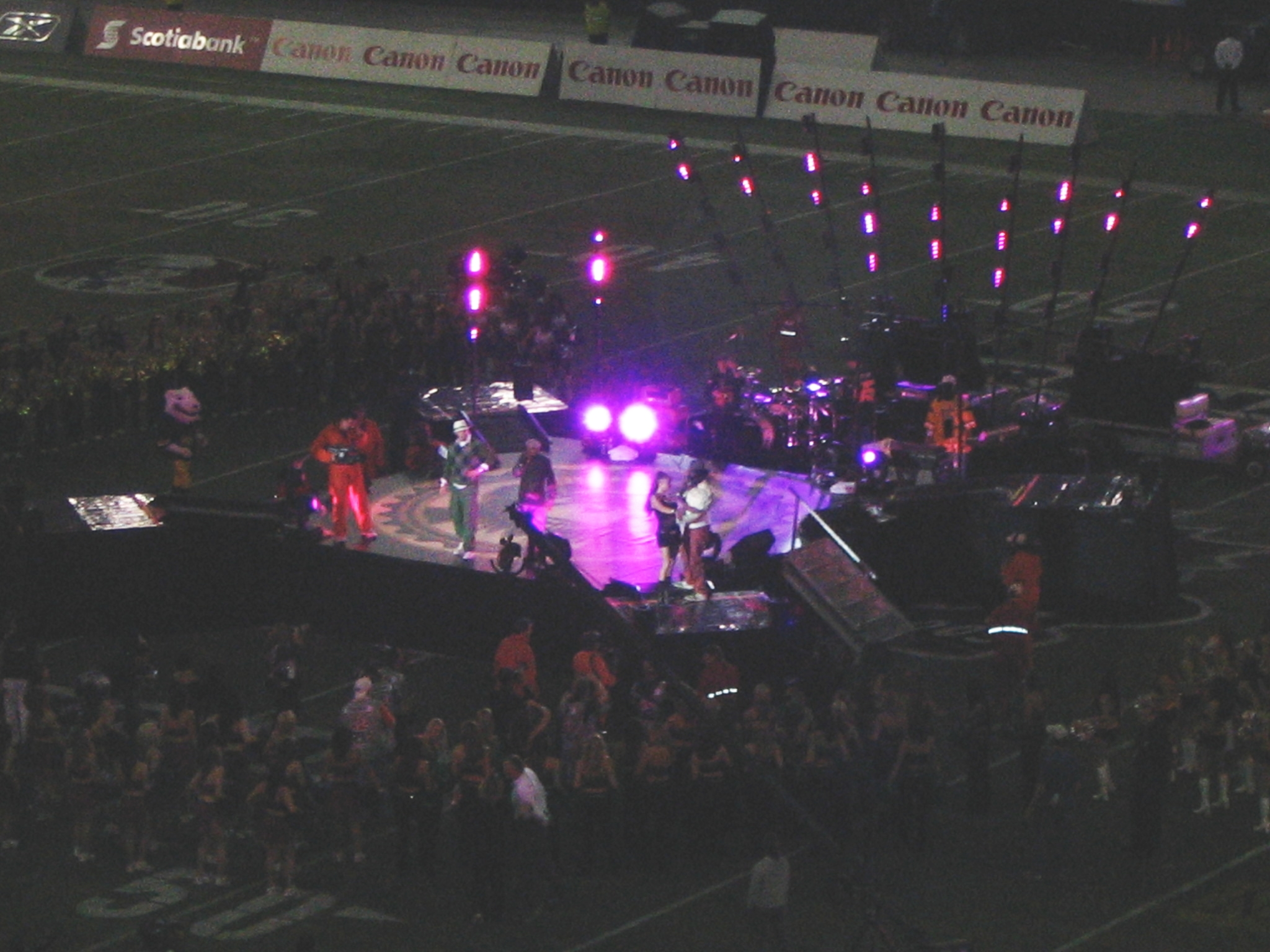
The Black Eyed Peas perform at halftime.

The game opened with a ceremonial coin toss by Prime Minister Paul Martin to determine who would start the game with possession of the football. As Martin came out to toss the coin, he was greeted with a rousing chorus of boos from the crowd, to which the prime minister responded with a smile and a wave to the crowd. Martin, a Liberal, was at the time embroiled in the sponsorship scandal.

The game got off to a slow start, with Edmonton holding a 10–1 lead going into half-time, thanks to a Sean Fleming field goal and a Ricky Ray touchdown pass to Ed Hervey. A rouge by Montreal kicker Damon Duval accounted for the Alouettes' point.

The second half was a back-and-forth affair. The Alouettes came on strong in the third quarter, scoring on a pair of goal-line plunges by backup running back Éric Lapointe, with the Eskimos notching a Fleming field goal in reply. After an Edmonton turnover, the Alouettes scored a Duval field goal giving them an 18–13 lead. On the ensuing kickoff Edmonton returner Tony Tompkins scored a 96-yard touchdown, the longest kickoff return in Grey Cup history. The third quarter ended with the Eskimos leading 20–18.

Montreal quarterback Anthony Calvillo scored on a one-yard bootleg that caught Eskimos linebacker Marcus Winn out of position. With the Alouettes leading 25–20, the Eskimos had one last chance to take the lead. Facing third-and-four in Montreal territory, Ray hit Derrell Mitchell on a deep out pattern to get a first down, and a trio of penalties left the Eskimos first-and-goal at the Alouettes' one-yard line. Ricky Ray punched it in for his second touchdown of the night. Then he hooked up with Jason Tucker to score a two-point conversion creating a 28–25 Edmonton lead with only a minute left.

The Alouettes struck back with a Duval field goal as time expired, tying the game at 28–28.

Montreal went first in the overtime shootout, and Calvillo passed to Dave Stala in the right corner of the endzone to give Montreal a 35–28 lead. Edmonton replied with Ray hitting Jason Tucker on an 11-yard score.

In the second overtime, the Eskimos were unable to score a touchdown on second and four. The kicker Fleming converted a field goal to bring the score to 38–35, with Montreal's turn in hand.

The second overtime featured an unusual if not illegal play. On first down, Calvillo faced a heavy Edmonton rush and tried to throw the ball away. Edmonton defensive end Joe Montford knocked the ball down at the line, but Calvillo was able to catch it. Calvillo then illegally threw the ball again into the endzone to wide receiver Kerry Watkins who, without an Eskimo within five yards, dropped the game winning (albeit illegal) pass. The play resulted in a 10-yard penalty against the Alouettes for an illegal forward pass, putting them on the 45-yard line. On 1st and 20, Calvillo was sacked by Charles Alston for a 13-yard loss, which pushed the ball out of Duval's field goal range. An incomplete pass on second down and a long injury break set the stage for third and 33. An Eskimos blitz forced Calvillo to scramble ten yards down the left sideline. Anticipating a tackle, Calvillo kicked the ball forward in order to keep Montreal's Grey Cup hopes alive, but the ball was recovered by Eskimo linebacker A. J. Gass.

== Most Valuable Players & trivia ==
In the presentation ceremony after the game, the Grey Cup Most Valuable Player award was given to Edmonton quarterback Ricky Ray, who completed 35 of 45 passes for 359 yards and two touchdowns. The Most Valuable Canadian was Edmonton backup fullback Maven Maurer (Note: Credited as Mike Maurer; The game was played before Maurer came out as transgender.) (substituting for the injured Mathieu Bertrand), who picked up 41 receiving yards on four catches.

Montreal and Edmonton have met in 11 Grey Cup clashes. The Alouettes prevailed in 1974, the Ice Bowl of 1977, and 2002. The Eskimos have won in 1954, 1955, 1956, 1975, 1978, 1979, 2003 and 2005.

== 2005 CFL playoffs ==
=== Division Semi-finals ===
November 13

==== East Semi-Final ====
Team	Q1	Q2	Q3	Q4	Total
Saskatchewan Roughriders	0	0	7	7	14
Montreal Alouettes	7	17	3	3	30

MONTREAL – The perennial powerhouse Alouettes boasted four 1,000-yard receivers for the second consecutive season (and second time in CFL history). But they finished a mere second in the East Division behind the defending champion Toronto Argonauts. As a result, they were forced to defend the hard surface at Olympic Stadium against the fourth-place team in the West Division, the Saskatchewan Roughriders, who took the third spot in the East Division after finishing higher than the Ottawa Renegades.

A remarkably low crowd of 31,199 turned out to watch the Alouettes stomp on the Roughriders in the first half, leaping out to a 24–0 lead on three Anthony Calvillo touchdown passes to Terry Vaughn, Ben Cahoon, Thyron Anderson and a Damon Duval field goal. By contrast, Saskatchewan quarterback Marcus Crandell struggled badly in the first half, after getting the start over Nealon Greene. The Roughriders offense helped the Alouettes by producing three turnovers.

After the embarrassing first half, Saskatchewan head coach Danny Barrett opted to leave Crandell in to start the third quarter. Crandell began to get over his struggles as the Alouettes sat back on their big lead, and threw a touchdown pass to Jamel Richardson early in the third quarter to give Roughriders fans some hope. But another touchdown pass to Jason French in the fourth quarter was the only other scoring the Roughriders could produce, and Duval hit two more field goals to send Montreal to Toronto for the East Final.

==== West Semi-Final ====
Team	Q1	Q2	Q3	Q4	Total
Edmonton Eskimos	0	12	4	17	33
Calgary Stampeders	9	14	0	3	26

CALGARY – Every advantage seemed to belong to the Calgary Stampeders in their Battle of Alberta playoff date against their rival, the Edmonton Eskimos. The Stampeders were playing at home and having won seven of their last eight games. Moreover, they had defeated Eskimos the previous week in a game that could have allowed the Eskimos to finish first in the West.

Sure enough, in front of a rabid home crowd, Calgary began to beat on Edmonton early. Three field goals by Calgary's leadfooted kicker Sandro DeAngelis put Calgary up 9–0 through the first quarter, while running back Joffrey Reynolds ate the Eskimos defense for lunch. The Eskimos allowed another fourteen points in the second quarter. In part, thanks to a massive 63-yard run by little-used Tony Stallings, who had 93 yards on only four carries. Reynolds scored the touchdown that Stallings set up, and quarterback Henry Burris added another on a goal-line plunge before the half.

The Eskimos would have been in deep trouble if not for kicker Sean Fleming, who nailed four field goals in the second quarter to give Edmonton a chance. But it was 23–12 Calgary at the break and things were not looking good for the Eskimos. Edmonton quarterback Ray had continued to struggle getting into the end zone, but the deficit was not his doing. The defense had let him down, he had not turned the ball over, and he had been victimized by dropped passes, particularly a would-be touchdown pass dropped by Trevor Gaylor. However, Edmonton coach Danny Maciocia tried to change the momentum by putting backup quarterback, and former starter, Jason Maas in for the second half (in contrast to Saskatchewan coach Barrett's decision to leave his quarterback in during the previous game).

With Maas under centre, the Eskimos began to claw back into the game. Calgary was held off the scoresheet in the third quarter while Fleming pounded his fifth field goal and added a rouge punt into the endzone. In the fourth quarter, Edmonton completed the comeback. The Eskimos started the fourth quarter with a devastating 93-yard clock-killing drive, finishing it up with a one-yard touchdown from fullback Mathieu Bertrand to tie the game at 23. The Stampeders began to roll on the next drive, but a fumble by Reynolds broke Calgary's back, and a touchdown pass from Maas to Jason Tucker gave the Eskimos their first lead. Deangelis and Fleming swapped field goals but Calgary could not come back, and the Eskimos advanced to the Western final.

=== Division Finals ===
November 20

==== East Final ====
Team	Q1	Q2	Q3	Q4	Total
Montreal Alouettes	0	6	14	13	33
Toronto Argonauts	14	0	3	0	17

TORONTO – During the 2004 CFL season, the Toronto Argonauts stunned Montreal at their own field, taking a 26–18 victory over the favoured Alouettes in the East final. The Argonauts went on to take the Grey Cup, and the Alouettes came into Toronto looking for revenge.

Early on, it looked like they would not get it. Toronto had come to party, as a team which has suffered attendance problems in recent seasons drew a near-sellout crowd of 44,211 through the turnstiles. The unusual fan attention may have motivated the Argonauts early, as their experienced quarterback Damon Allen started on a roll. First, Allen scored the first points of the game with a one-yard touchdown run. Then, he threw a strike to receiver R. Jay Soward, who went 43 yards to the endzone. He then went to the stands, grabbed a bag of popcorn, and shared it with teammate Robert Baker in a rather novel showboating touchdown celebration.

That would be the high-water mark of the game for the Argonauts. In the second quarter, Damon Duval hit two field goals to make the score 14–6 at the half. Devastatingly, for the Alouettes, starting running back Robert Edwards went down in the second quarter with a rib injury. Backup Éric Lapointe came into the game and would become the key cog of Montreal's offence in the second half.

Montreal's defence began to catch on to Allen in the second half and the Toronto quarterback began taking hits and throwing ill-advised passes. He ended up with two interceptions and a fumble, while the Argonauts added three other fumbles to make a total of six turnovers. Lapointe scored three second-half running touchdowns for Montreal while quarterback Anthony Calvillo put in a mediocre 190 yards for a team renowned for aerial pyrotechnics. Allen's 273 yards left Calvillo in the dust, but Montreal did not commit a single turnover in the game. Only a single Noel Prefontaine field goal in the third quarter accounted for Toronto scoring after the first half. Damon Duval hit four field goals to add to Lapointe's three touchdowns giving Montreal a Grey Cup berth and a 33–17 victory.

==== West Final ====
Team	Q1	Q2	Q3	Q4	Total
Edmonton Eskimos	14	7	0	7	28
BC Lions	3	7	11	2	23

VANCOUVER – On the heels of his benching against Calgary, it seemed likely that Edmonton head coach Danny Maciocia would leave Ricky Ray as the backup for the West final against the British Columbia Lions. However, Maciocia said mid-week that Ray would start, leaving Jason Maas on the bench. In B.C., Dave Dickenson unsurprisingly got the start over former Most Outstanding Player Casey Printers, leading some to joke that four of the CFL's best quarterbacks would be in this game.

In contrast to their previous game against Calgary, Edmonton started out strong against British Columbia. They racked up two Sean Fleming field goals, a rouge punt through the endzone, and a one-yard touchdown plunge by Ray to notch fourteen first-quarter points. This compared to a single Mark McLoughlin field goal for B.C. Another Ray touchdown run in the second quarter gave the Eskimos a 21–3 lead before Casey Printers, sent in on a short yardage situation, scored a one-yard touchdown run of his own to narrow the lead to 21–10 at the half.

Ray had looked good in the first half, but ran into trouble not always of his own making. He threw an interception to Barron Miles that bounced off Edmonton receiver Trevor Gaylor's shoulder pads and lost a fumble on a bad exchange. Two turnovers that produced ten points for the Lions. Meanwhile, Dickenson briefly got in a groove, nailing Geroy Simon with a ninety-yard touchdown toss, the longest in Lions playoff history. After another McLoughlin field goal and a rouge punt by Duncan O'Mahony, all of a sudden the game was tied at 21 after the third quarter.

To start the fourth quarter, Maciocia decided to make a quarterback change for the third consecutive game. He sent in Jason Maas to replace Ray, whose 17 of 28 for 207 yards, along with two rushing touchdowns, a fumble, and an interception, were acceptable but not fantastic.

Maas's arrival seemed to spur on the Edmonton defence, as they shut Dickenson down the rest of the way. Dickenson threw an interception directly into the hands of Edmonton linebacker Steven Marsh. It was only his sixth interception that season and set up a Maas 15-yard pass to Trevor Gaylor to make it 28–21. The far-from-sellout but boisterous crowd of 37,337 grew restless and British Columbia coach Wally Buono sent in his backup, Printers, to great applause.

However, aside from a dramatic 47-yard pass to Paris Jackson, Printers was ineffective. After the toss to Jackson, Printers promptly threw an interception to Keyou Craver at the goal line. The Eskimos went two-and-out and opted to have Derrell Mitchell concede a safety rather than have Sean Fleming punt out of his own endzone. This pulled the Lions to within five points. The game ended on a controversial non-call, in which Casey Printers threw the ball up for Geroy Simon, however, he was bumped on his way to the ball, and the pass ended up being incomplete. Some argue that the Edmonton defender was merely exercising his fair right to the ball. Others argue that he interfered with Simon, while some suggest that the ball was not catchable at all. Regardless, the referees did not throw a flag, and Edmonton went on to win the Grey Cup.
