= Fresno Frenzy =

Arena football team

Logo

General information
- Founded: 2001
- Folded: 2002
- Headquartered: Selland Arena in Fresno, California
- Colors: Blue, black, silver, white

Personnel
- President: Patrick Tenyenhius

Team history
- Fresno Frenzy (2002)

Home fields
- Selland Arena (2002)

League / conference affiliations
- af2 (2002): National Conference (2002); Western Division (2002)

The Fresno Frenzy were an expansion af2 team for the 2002 season. Fresno was joined by the Albany Conquest, Bakersfield Blitz, Cape Fear Wildcats, Hawaiian Islanders, Mobile Wizards, Mohegan Wolves, New Haven Ninjas, San Diego Riptide & the Wilkes-Barre/Scranton Pioneers. In 2002, they played their home games in Selland Arena, in which they finished 4–12, last place in the Western Division of the National Conference. Despite going an even 4–4 in Fresno, they bombshelled on the road, going 0-8 that season. After the 2002 season, they folded after one year in Fresno. Arena football would return later to Fresno in 2004, when the original Bakersfield Blitz moved to Fresno, and called themselves the Central Valley Coyotes.

The only big name to come out of Fresno was Ricky Ray, a former standout with Shasta High School (Redding, California), Shasta College (Redding, California) and Sacramento State University. Ray played seven games for the Frenzy before being signed by the Canadian Football League and winning four Grey Cup championships, two with the Edmonton Eskimos and two with the Toronto Argonauts.

== Season-by-season ==
ArenaCup Champions	ArenaCup Appearances	Division champions	Playoff berth

Season	League	Conference	Division	Regular season			Postseason results
Season	League	Conference	Division	Finish	Wins	Losses	Postseason results
Fresno Frenzy
2002	AF2	National	Western	4th	4	12	
