= Éric Lapointe (Canadian football) =

Canadian football player

No. 5
- Position: Running back

Personal information
- Born: September 13, 1974 (age 52); Montreal, Quebec, Canada
- Listed height: 5 ft 11 in (1.80 m)
- Listed weight: 208 lb (94 kg)

Career information
- University: Mount Allison
- CFL draft: 1999: 3rd round, 20th overall pick

Career history
- 1999: Edmonton Eskimos*
- 1999: Hamilton Tiger-Cats
- 2000: Toronto Argonauts
- 2001–2006: Montreal Alouettes
- * Offseason or practice squad member only

Awards and highlights
- 2× Grey Cup champion (1999, 2002); 2× Hec Crighton Trophy (1996, 1998); CIAU Rookie of the Year (1995); CIAU record: 1,619 rushing yards in a season (1996)
- Stats at CFL.ca (archive)
- Canadian Football Hall of Fame (Class of 2012)

Éric Lapointe (born September 13, 1974) is a Canadian former professional football player. He was a running back with the Montreal Alouettes in the Canadian Football League (CFL).

== Biography ==
A native of Brossard, Quebec, Lapointe is an alumnus of Mount Allison University, where he played football for the Mount Allison Mounties. While playing at the university level, he was Canada's Rookie of the Year, a three-time All-Canadian, and a two-time Hec Crighton Trophy winner as Most Outstanding Player in Canada (1996 and 1998), for which he received special congratulations by the Legislature of Nova Scotia. He was also a rushing leader for the Atlantic conference and nationally. In 1996, he rushed 1,619 yards in 7 games to break the record in Atlantic University Sport. In three and a half seasons, he rushed 4,666 yards, just 29 yards short of the CIAU all-time career rushing record. Despite being eligible to play for 5 years in Canadian university football, Lapointe graduated and opted to finish his university sports career after only 4 years. He still supports the team and often can be seen at their games in Quebec.

After graduation in 1999, Lapointe was selected in the third round (20th overall) of the CFL entry draft by the Edmonton Eskimos but was released shortly afterward to play for the Hamilton Tiger-Cats. As part of this 1999 Grey Cup winning team, Lapointe finished 11th in the league with 691 rushing yards while missing 6 games. He ran for 191 yard in his first CFL game, and was named CFL player of the week.

In 2000, Lapointe was traded to the Toronto Argonauts in a multi-player deal but languished and left the team during the 2001 off-season as a free agent to found his Financial Firm, closer to his home in Montreal.

Lapointe joined the Montreal Alouettes in February 2001 and played running back for the team during the 2001-2006 seasons; during the 2005 season he came into prominence after running for 115 yard and 3 touchdowns against the Toronto Argonautes in the Eastern Finals, being named the starting running back for the Alouettes in the 93rd Grey Cup where he scored two touchdowns and was the leading rusher (the Als lost 38-35 to the Esks in a thrilling overtime showdown).

Over an eight-season CFL career, Lapointe played in five Grey Cup finals, winning two.

In 2005, he was selected by Canadian university football fans as the best university football player of all time.

=== Retirement ===
Lapointe announced his retirement from the CFL following the 2006 season and is currently the owner of Heward Investment Management, and Invicta Family Office. In 2012, he became the second player elected into the Canadian Football Hall of Fame on the basis of his University/College career, being voted in for his time as a Mountie. On September 14, 2013, Lapointe had his #5 retired at Mount Allison's Homecoming Football Game.
