= 100th Grey Cup =

2012 Canadian Football championship game

Calgary Stampeders	Toronto Argonauts
(12–6)	(9–9)
22	35
Head coach: John Hufnagel	Head coach: Scott Milanovich
	1	2	3	4	Total
Calgary Stampeders	3	3	5	11	22
Toronto Argonauts	7	17	3	8	35
- Date: November 25, 2012
- Stadium: Rogers Centre
- Location: Toronto
- Most Valuable Player: Chad Kackert, RB (Argonauts)
- Most Valuable Canadian: Ricky Foley, DE (Argonauts)
- Favourite: Stampeders by 2
- National anthem: Burton Cummings
- Coin toss: Governor General David Johnston
- Referee: Glen Johnson
- Halftime show: Justin Bieber, Carly Rae Jepsen, Marianas Trench and Gordon Lightfoot. Pregame: Johnny Reid
- Attendance: 53,208

Broadcasters
- Network: (Canada) TSN, RDS (United States) NBC Sports Network
- Announcers: (TSN): Chris Cuthbert, Glen Suitor, Dave Randorf, Jock Climie, Matt Dunigan, Chris Schultz, Milt Stegall
- Ratings: 5.8 million (average); 13 million (total)

The 100th Grey Cup was a Canadian football game between the East Division champion Toronto Argonauts and the West Division champion Calgary Stampeders of the Canadian Football League to decide the Grey Cup champions of the 2012 season.

The game took place on Sunday, November 25, 2012, at Rogers Centre in Toronto, Ontario. This was the fourth (and last) Grey Cup game played at Rogers Centre (by the next Grey Cup game that Toronto hosted in 2016, it was played at BMO Field), and the 46th in the city of Toronto.

The Argonauts defeated the Stampeders 35–22 to win their 16th Grey Cup title.

This was the third meeting between Calgary and Toronto for the Grey Cup championship and the first since the 79th Grey Cup in 1991. This was also the second consecutive year that the Grey Cup game involved, and was won by, the team from the host city. The result of the game also meant that Argonauts owner David Braley became the first team owner to win back-to-back Grey Cups with two different teams; Braley also owned the 2011 champions, the BC Lions (Braley has since sold the Toronto Argonauts). Over 5.8 million viewers watched the game, with roughly 5.5 million originating from English Canada, making the game the most-watched Grey Cup ever recorded on English-language television.

Following the game, Toronto running back Chad Kackert was named the Most Valuable Player. His teammate, defensive end Ricky Foley received the Dick Suderman Trophy as the Most Valuable Canadian.

== Host city selection ==
On February 5, 2010, news agencies reported that the game had been awarded to Toronto. On June 11, 2010, it was officially announced by the CFL that the city of Toronto would host the game. Toronto hosted the first Grey Cup and has been the site of the most Grey Cup games. It was the 46th time that Toronto hosted the event (and 4th at Rogers Centre).

== 100th Grey Cup celebrations ==
The league promoted the 100th Grey Cup in several ways. The Grey Cup 100 Train Tour, with three CFL-themed railway coaches, criss-crossed Canada for ten weeks. Starting September 9 at Pacific Central Station in Vancouver, the Grey Cup was placed on board the train during an official ceremony. The coaches traveled east across Canada, visiting over 100 communities including all eight CFL cities as well as Ottawa, Quebec City, Moncton, and Halifax. It also made stops in Nunavut and Newfoundland and Labrador. The train arrived in Toronto on November 17, 2012. It featured a museum car, a railcar with contemporary memorabilia, and a car containing the Grey Cup itself.

Canada Post celebrated the 100th Grey Cup by issuing a series of commemorative postage stamps, designed by Bensimon Byrne of Toronto. Stamps have been produced for each team; every franchise chose one player in its history to be on the foreground of their team's stamp and the background features a historical moment from a past Grey Cup.

Team	Foreground	Background
BC Lions	Geroy Simon	Lui Passaglia
Edmonton Eskimos	Tom Wilkinson	Warren Moon
Calgary Stampeders	Wayne Harris	
Saskatchewan Roughriders	George Reed	Dave Ridgway
Winnipeg Blue Bombers	Ken Ploen	
Hamilton Tiger-Cats	Danny McManus	
Montreal Alouettes	Anthony Calvillo	Sonny Wade
Toronto Argonauts	Pinball Clemons	

In the week leading up to the game, the Canadian government recognized the historical significance of the Grey Cup at a ceremony at Varsity Stadium in Toronto, which hosted the Grey Cup game twenty-nine times between 1909 and 1957. Because of this recognition the Grey Cup will be placed in Canada's system of national historic sites, persons and events.

On November 22, the Queen of Canada, Elizabeth II, issued a message recognizing the hundredth edition of the game, as well as the 48th edition of the Vanier Cup, which was played two days prior to the Grey Cup. In her message, the Queen noted the monarchial ties of both championships and wished an enjoyable weekend for the teams, players and fans.

== Path to the Grey Cup ==
=== Calgary Stampeders ===
The Stampeders finished second in the West Division with a 12–6 record, including four consecutive victories leading into the playoffs. As a result, they hosted the third place Saskatchewan Roughriders in the West Semi-Final at McMahon Stadium. Calgary was led by running back Jon Cornish, whose total of 1,457 rushing yards during the season set a league record for most by a Canadian-born player. Stampeders' head coach John Hufnagel named first-string quarterback Drew Tate the starter even though it would be his first full game since suffering a shoulder injury on July 7 against Toronto. Tate excelled in the game; he completed 22 of 26 passes for 363 yards and was named the CFL's offensive player of the week to lead Calgary to a 36–30 victory in the game. The game ended in dramatic fashion as, after a Calgary field goal with 1:22 remaining in the game put the Stampeders up 29–23, Saskatchewan quarterback Darian Durant engineered a quick touchdown drive to give the Roughriders a one-point lead with one minute to play. However, Tate connected on a 68-yard touchdown pass to Romby Bryant with 19 seconds remaining to complete the Calgary victory.

The victory advanced the Stampeders to the West Final, played in Vancouver, against the 13–5 BC Lions. It was revealed in the days leading up to the November 18 game that Tate suffered a broken wrist late in the game against Saskatchewan that ended his season. Veteran backup Kevin Glenn, who was the team's primary quarterback for much of the season due to Tate's injuries, was named the starter against BC. Glenn threw three touchdown passes to lead the Stampeders to a 34–29 win over the defending champion Lions. Cornish rushed for 112 yards on 18 carries and caught two passes for 42 yards was named the CFL's top Canadian for the week.

=== Toronto Argonauts ===
The 9–9 Argonauts finished second in the East Division and hosted the division semi-final against the Edmonton Eskimos, who at 7–11 finished fourth in the West but crossed over by virtue of having a superior record to the third place team in the East, the Winnipeg Blue Bombers. Toronto quarterback Ricky Ray was the focus of the game, as he spent the first nine years of his CFL career as Edmonton's franchise quarterback until a trade prior to the 2012 season sent him to Toronto. Edmonton struggled throughout the season to replace him, and in the East Final, starter Kerry Joseph completed only four passes for 64 yards before being replaced at half time. Backup Matt Nichols replaced him until suffering a serious ankle injury in the second half. Ray, meanwhile, completed 23 of 30 passes for 239 yards and led the Argonauts offence to a team-record 31 points in the second quarter en route to a 42–26 victory.

The Argonauts then faced the division leading Montreal Alouettes (11–7) in the East Final. Toronto receiver Chad Owens, who led the CFL with 3,863 all-purpose yards, was a former Alouette who was traded by the team to Toronto in 2010. He led all players in the East Final with 207 receiving yards on 11 catches, and was named the league's most outstanding player of the week. Ray threw for 399 yards and Toronto took advantage of turnovers to defeat the favoured Alouettes 27–20.

=== Head-to-head ===
Calgary and Toronto met twice in the regular season, both games won by the Argonauts. The first, a 39–36 victory on July 7 in Toronto, was the game where Tate suffered the shoulder injury that forced him onto the injured list for 14 games. The second win came in Calgary, a 22–14 victory on August 18. Despite the outcome of their two regular season meetings, Calgary was named a two-point favourite over Toronto in the Grey Cup by sports betting agencies.

It was also the third meeting between the two teams in Grey Cup play. They first met in the 59th Grey Cup in 1971, when the Stampeders won a defensive battle 14–11. It was Calgary's first Grey Cup victory since their perfect season in 1948. The two teams met again 20 years later in the 79th Grey Cup. Calgary quarterback Danny Barrett set Grey Cup records of 39 pass completions and 56 attempts as the Stampeders more than doubled the Argonauts offensive production, 406 yards to 174. Special teams were the difference in the game however, as Barrett was intercepted three times and Toronto's Rocket Ismail ran an 87-yard kickoff return for a touchdown en route to a 36–21 Argonaut victory.

== Game summary ==
Calgary, being the designated away team, made the call of heads for the coin toss; the result was a tails, allowing Toronto to choose to receive the ball for the first half of the game. The roof of the Rogers Centre was closed for the entirety of the game.

On Toronto's first offensive play of the game, quarterback Ricky Ray attempted a long throw to Andre Durie but was intercepted by Quincy Butler. It was Ray's first interception since October 27. However, Calgary was unable to capitalize on the turnover and was forced to punt the football to end their first drive. Calgary committed their first turnover of the game on their next possession when running back Jon Cornish fumbled the ball on a handoff from quarterback Kevin Glenn. The ball was recovered by Ricky Foley. In his celebration, he kicked the ball into the crowd, and luckily did not receive a 10, 15, or 25-yard penalty for objectionable conduct. Toronto ended up opening up the scoring on the ensuing drive thanks to a five-yard touchdown run by the league's Most Outstanding Player Chad Owens.

The Stampeders responded to the touchdown with a field goal by Rene Paredes to cut the score down to 7–3 and they quickly regained possession of the ball, but the drive was cut short when Glenn was picked off by Toronto cornerback Pacino Horne, who ran the ball in for a touchdown to put the Argos up 14–3 early in the second quarter. On their following possession, Toronto found themselves at Calgary's 12-yard line following a 62-yard pass from Ray to Jason Barnes, but were forced to settle for a field goal by the Stampeders defence. Calgary responded with a field goal of their own to reduce the Argo lead to 17–6. Toronto would add another touchdown before halftime on a one-yard touchdown catch by Dontrelle Inman from Jarious Jackson.

Having received the ball at the start of the second half, Calgary moved the ball from their own 10-yard line to scoring range thanks to a 15-yard pass from Glenn to slotback Marquay McDaniel and a Toronto pass interference penalty. However, the Toronto defence again forced the Stampeders to kick a field goal, cutting the score to 24–9. Following a Toronto field goal midway through the third quarter, Calgary's Larry Taylor ran the ensuing kickoff 105 yards for an apparent touchdown, however the play was called back around midfield due to a holding penalty called against Keon Raymond. The penalty negated the score, and the Stampeders were again unable to overcome the Argonauts defence, punting the ball. On their next drive, the Stampeders were unable to capitalize despite a penalty to Toronto player Adriano Belli, who received a disqualification after an altercation with Calgary offensive lineman Jon Gott; Calgary was forced to punt the ball, but was able to force Toronto to concede a safety three plays later to end the third quarter.

The fourth quarter opened promisingly for Calgary. On a second-and-long play by the Stampeders, a pass interference penalty was called on Argos defensive back Ahmad Carroll to put them in scoring range. However, the Argonauts defence again prevented the Stampeders from reaching the end zone and Calgary settled for their fourth field goal of the game. With 5:56 left in the game, Ricky Ray threw his second touchdown pass of the night to put the Argos up 34–14. Stampeders receiver Maurice Price scored his team's lone touchdown of the game with twenty seconds remaining on the clock and followed up with the two-point conversion. After a failed onside kick, Toronto allowed the clock run down, winning the game by a final score of 35–22.

Toronto's Chad Kackert was named the Most Valuable Player of the Grey Cup after rushing the ball 20 times for 133 yards and adding 62 yards from 8 pass receptions. Defensive end Ricky Foley, a native of Courtice, Ontario, won the Dick Suderman Trophy as the game's top Canadian player after recovering a Calgary fumble early in the game and for helping to limit Calgary's Cornish to 57 yards rushing for the game.

=== Scoring summary ===
First Quarter
TOR – TD Owens 5 yd pass from Ray (Waters convert) (7:32) 7 – 0 TOR
CGY – FG Paredes 40 (4:09) 7 – 3 TOR
Second Quarter
TOR – TD Horne 25 yd interception return (Waters convert) (14:46) 14 – 3 TOR
TOR – FG Waters 16 (9:25) 17 – 3 TOR
CGY – FG Paredes 18 (2:33) 17 – 6 TOR
TOR – TD Inman 1 yd pass from Jackson (Waters convert) (0:22) 24 – 6 TOR
Third Quarter
CGY – FG Paredes 27 (6:29) 24 – 9 TOR
TOR – FG Waters 30 (3:01) 27 – 9 TOR
CGY – Safety (0:04) 27 – 11 TOR
Fourth Quarter
CGY – FG Paredes 19 (9:58) 27 – 14 TOR
TOR – TD Durie 7 yd pass from Ray (Waters convert) (5:56) 34 – 14 TOR
TOR – Single Prefontaine 53 yd punt (1:42) 35 – 14 TOR
CGY – TD Price 12 yd pass from Mitchell (Price 2-pt convert) (0:20) 35 – 22 TOR

== Ceremonies and associated events ==
A "fan parade", called the Sun Life Grey Cup Fan March, took place on November 25, moving from Varsity Stadium at the University of Toronto to Rogers Centre. The coin toss, using the first 100th Grey Cup commemorative coin struck by the Royal Canadian Mint, was executed by Governor General of Canada David Johnston, as was the ceremonial kickoff.

== Entertainment ==
The CFL unveiled an "all-Canadian, all-star lineup" of musical acts to perform the pre-game and halftime shows at the game. Burton Cummings, former lead singer of 1960s–1970s rock band The Guess Who, performed "O Canada", and country artist Johnny Reid performed as part of the pre-game show. The halftime show featured pop artists Justin Bieber and Carly Rae Jepsen, along with rock band Marianas Trench and balladeer Gordon Lightfoot. CFL commissioner Mark Cohon explained that the lineup spanned multiple generations of music, was "quintessentially Canadian and undoubtedly world class", and would "command a huge and diverse audience, entertaining our most loyal fans and attracting new ones to our game's greatest showcase."

Despite the CFL's endorsement, many questioned the league's choice of performers. In particular, the selection of Justin Bieber was criticized for his lack of appeal to the demographic attending the game. During the halftime show, Bieber was booed throughout his performance, whereas Gordon Lightfoot's shortened performance of "Canadian Railroad Trilogy" was met with raucous approval from the crowd. Burton Cummings also received criticism for accidentally omitting a line "God keep our land" from the national anthem.

== Television ==
The game was broadcast in Canada on TSN in English and its sister station, RDS, in French. TSN commissioned a documentary series, Engraved on a Nation, to commemorate the centennial. The game was televised in the United States by NBCSN. TSN's coverage was produced by Paul Graham, which he described as one of his "proudest achievements".

With an average of 5.5 million viewers for TSN, it was the most watched Grey Cup game of all-time on English television. Including RDS, viewership averaged 5.8 million, while over 13 million Canadians watched at least part of the contest. While these totals represented a 28% increase over the year before, both fell short of the all-time records of 6.1 million viewers on average and 14 million total set in the 97th Grey Cup in 2009. The half-time show averaged 6.1 million viewers.
