= Ricky Ray =

American football player (born 1979)

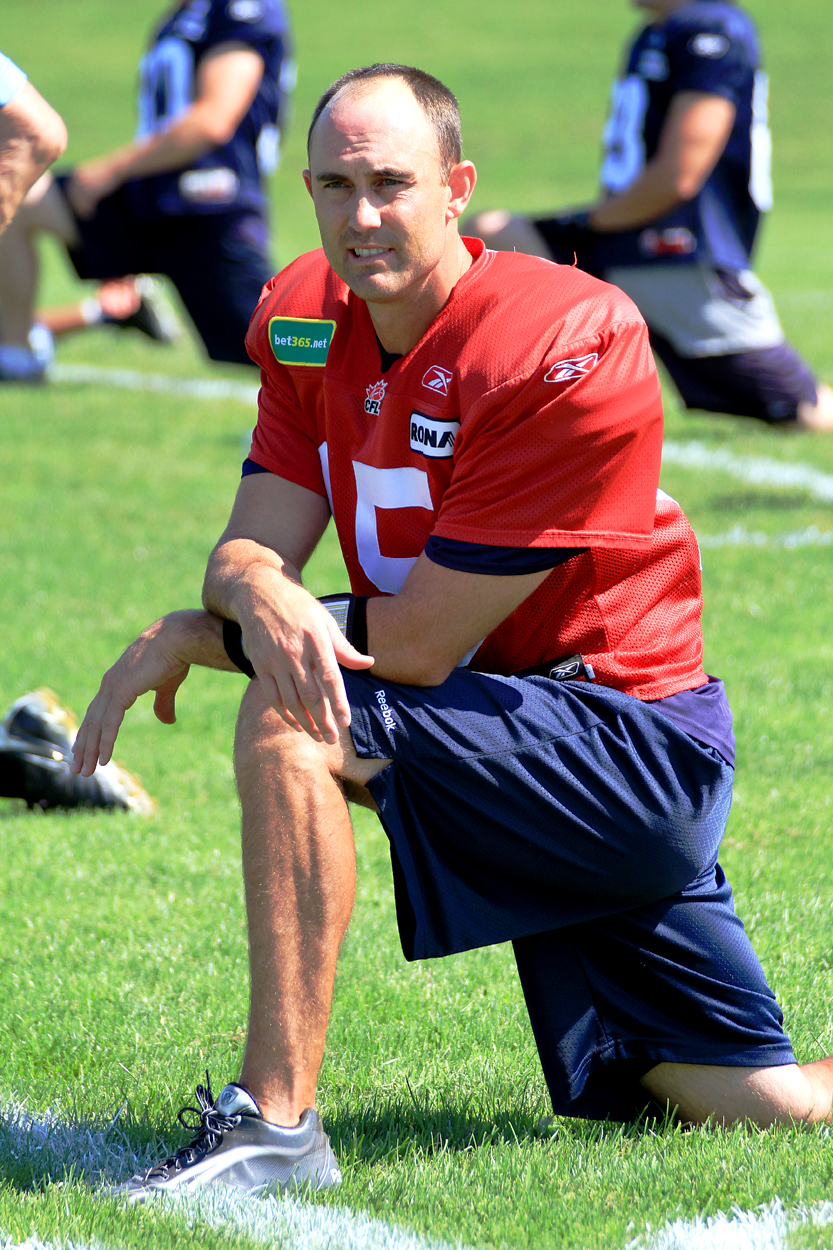
- Ray with the Toronto Argonauts in 2012

No. 15
- Position: Quarterback

Personal information
- Born: October 22, 1979 (age 47); Happy Camp, California, U.S.
- Listed height: 6 ft 3 in (1.91 m)
- Listed weight: 210 lb (95 kg)

Career information
- High school: Shasta (Redding, California)
- College: Sacramento State
- NFL draft: 2001: undrafted

Career history
- 2001: San Francisco 49ers*
- 2002: Fresno Frenzy
- 2002–2003: Edmonton Eskimos
- 2004: New York Jets
- 2005–2011: Edmonton Eskimos
- 2012–2018: Toronto Argonauts
- * Offseason or practice squad member only

Awards and highlights
- 4× Grey Cup champion (2003, 2005, 2012, 2017); Grey Cup MVP (2005); 3× Terry Evanshen Trophy (2013, 2014, 2017); Rogers Fans' Choice Award (2003); 3× CFL All-Star (2006, 2013, 2014); CFL West All-Star (2006); 3× CFL East All-Star (2013, 2014, 2017); 4× CFL passing yards leader (2006, 2008, 2009, 2014); CFL passing touchdowns leader (2014); 5× Eskimos' Most Outstanding Player (2003, 2005–2008); Second-Team CFL 2010s All-Decade Team; CFL records: Highest completion percentage in a single season (77.2); Highest completion percentage in a single game (95.0); Highest passer rating in a single season (126.4); Most Grey Cup wins by a starting quarterback (4)

Career CFL statistics
- Pass attempts: 7,247
- Pass completions: 4,942
- TD–INT: 325–177
- Passing yards: 60,429
- Passer rating: 98.4
- Stats at CFL.ca
- Canadian Football Hall of Fame (Class of 2022)

Richard Junior Ray (born October 22, 1979) is an American former professional football player who was a quarterback in the Canadian Football League (CFL) for the Edmonton Eskimos and Toronto Argonauts. He also briefly spent time in the af2, as well as with the San Francisco 49ers and New York Jets of the National Football League (NFL). Ray is the all-time leader in passing yardage, pass completions, and passing touchdowns for both the Edmonton Elks and Toronto Argonauts. He won the Grey Cup championship a record four times as a starting quarterback, in 2003, 2005, 2012, and 2017. He was inducted into the Canadian Football Hall of Fame in 2022.

== Early life ==
Richard Junior Ray was born on October 22, 1979, in Happy Camp, California. He attended Shasta High School in Redding, California.

== College career ==
In 1997, Ray made his debut for Shasta College, a two-year community college in Redding, California. He became a first-team All-American and state player of the year in 1998. He also set several school records during his time at Shasta, most notably throwing 199 consecutive pass attempts without allowing an interception. On December 20, 2014, Ricky was inducted into the Shasta County Sports Hall Of Fame.

Ray moved on to play NCAA college football with Sacramento State University. In 1999, Ray completed 179 of 291 passes for 2,422 yards and 20 touchdowns. In 2000, he completed 168 of 270 passes (62.2%) for 13 touchdowns with 6 interceptions. Ray is still in the top ten for many Sacramento State career passing records.

== Professional career ==
=== San Francisco 49ers ===
After his college career ended in 2000, Ray, having gone undrafted by the NFL, attended training camp with the NFL's San Francisco 49ers, but did not make the team and only dressed for a single pre-season game. He earned the nickname "Frito Ray" by teammates, as he was working as a delivery driver for Frito-Lay chips when he was called up for training camp.

=== Fresno Frenzy ===
Ray made his professional debut with the Fresno Frenzy of the Arena Football League's developmental league af2. He played seven games for the Frenzy, where he was coached by former CFL quarterback Rick Worman. He completed 116 passes for 1,296 yards, 25 touchdowns and 6 interceptions. Worman was instrumental in arranging a tryout with the Eskimos.

=== Edmonton Eskimos (first stint) ===
In 2002, Ray made the CFL's Edmonton Eskimos out of training camp. The Eskimos entered the season as a competitive West Division team and featured notable depth at the quarterback position. Starter Jason Maas had already established himself as a leading quarterback in the league. Ray started the season as the Eskimos' third-string quarterback.

Late in the fourth quarter of a Week Four game against the Saskatchewan Roughriders, Maas was knocked out of the game, and would not be available for the Week Five matchup against the rival BC Lions. Ray made his debut relieving Maas in the Saskatchewan game and his first start against the Lions, throwing for four touchdowns. Ray threw for 2,991 yards, 24 touchdowns, and nine interceptions with a quarterback rating of 101.3, highest in the league.

With Maas still recovering from injury, Ray led the Eskimos to the Grey Cup game against Montréal. Ray threw for 324 yards, but the Eskimos lost the 90th Grey Cup to the Alouettes 26–16 at home. Ray failed to convert on a vital two-point conversion late in the game that could have tied the affair at 18–18. The failure forced the Eskimos into an onside kick attempt, which failed as Montréal returned it for a touchdown and took a lead that they would not lose. During the year, Ray was named Offensive Player of the Week and Month, but was not eligible for the Offensive Rookie of the Year award following a brief stint in the NFL.

Maas returned for the 2003 season, setting up a quarterback duel between Maas and Ray during training camp. However, Maas sustained a back injury during the off-season, a condition that would require surgery. Ray remained the starter even after Maas returned.

Despite splitting time early in the year, Ray ended with a 67.6 completion percentage, 4,640 yards, 35 touchdowns and 13 interceptions and was a candidate for the Most Outstanding Player award. The Eskimos rebounded from their slow start and made the playoffs, defeating the Saskatchewan Roughriders in the Western final as Ray threw for 356 yards. The 91st Grey Cup in Regina, Saskatchewan featured the Eskimos against the Alouettes. The Eskimos defeated the Alouettes 34–22, for the team's first Grey Cup in a decade. Ray played exceptionally against Alouettes coach Don Matthews's renowned blitzing defense, completing 22 of 32 passes for 301 yards and two touchdowns.

=== New York Jets ===
After two years in Canada, Ray began to look south of the border. Former Eskimo Warren Moon, a legend in the NFL and CFL, advised Ray to stay in the CFL a little while longer to improve as a quarterback and receive a better shot at a starting job. But the lure of the league he had dreamed of in his youth proved too strong to keep Ray in Canada, and he signed with the New York Jets.

In the 2004 NFL season, Ray dressed for six games with the Jets. When starter Chad Pennington went down briefly with a rotator cuff injury, backup Quincy Carter came in and played well, relegating Ray to the bench. After the season concluded, Ray asked for his release by the Jets. Ray subsequently returned to the Eskimos.

=== Edmonton Eskimos (second stint) ===
Ray's return was accompanied by controversy. He became the favourite to take the starting job in Edmonton, but, once again, the team was deep at quarterback in 2005. In addition to Ray, Maas remained in Edmonton. While Ray had been in the NFL, Maas had been the starter and had played superbly, becoming only the second Eskimo to pass for 5,000 yards in a single season.

Ray received the starting job out of training camp in 2005. Maas, despite frequent trade rumours, was once again made his backup. Jason Johnson remained on the roster as the third quarterback. Ray started the 2005 season strongly, leading the league in completions and yardage. He set a pro football record with 479 completions in 2005. However, towards the end of the year, Ray's play faltered, concluding in him not throwing a touchdown in the season's last four games.

In the playoffs, Ray was benched twice more, both in the West Semi-Final against Calgary and the West Final against British Columbia, and both times Maas came on the field, threw very well, and recorded the winning points. Head coach Danny Maciocia, however, promised Ray the start in the 93rd Grey Cup, perhaps because of rumours that a trade of Maas to the Hamilton Tiger-Cats had already been arranged. This time, however, Ray seized the opportunity presented to him, throwing for 359 yards and two touchdowns while completing 35 of 45 passes. The Eskimos defeated the Montreal Alouettes 38–35 in overtime, and Ray was named most valuable player of the Grey Cup.

In 2006, Ray started for the Eskimos for every single game of the season, led the league in passing with exactly 5,000 yards, and was near the top in completion percentage at 65.7%, 21 touchdowns, and a passer rating of 89.8.

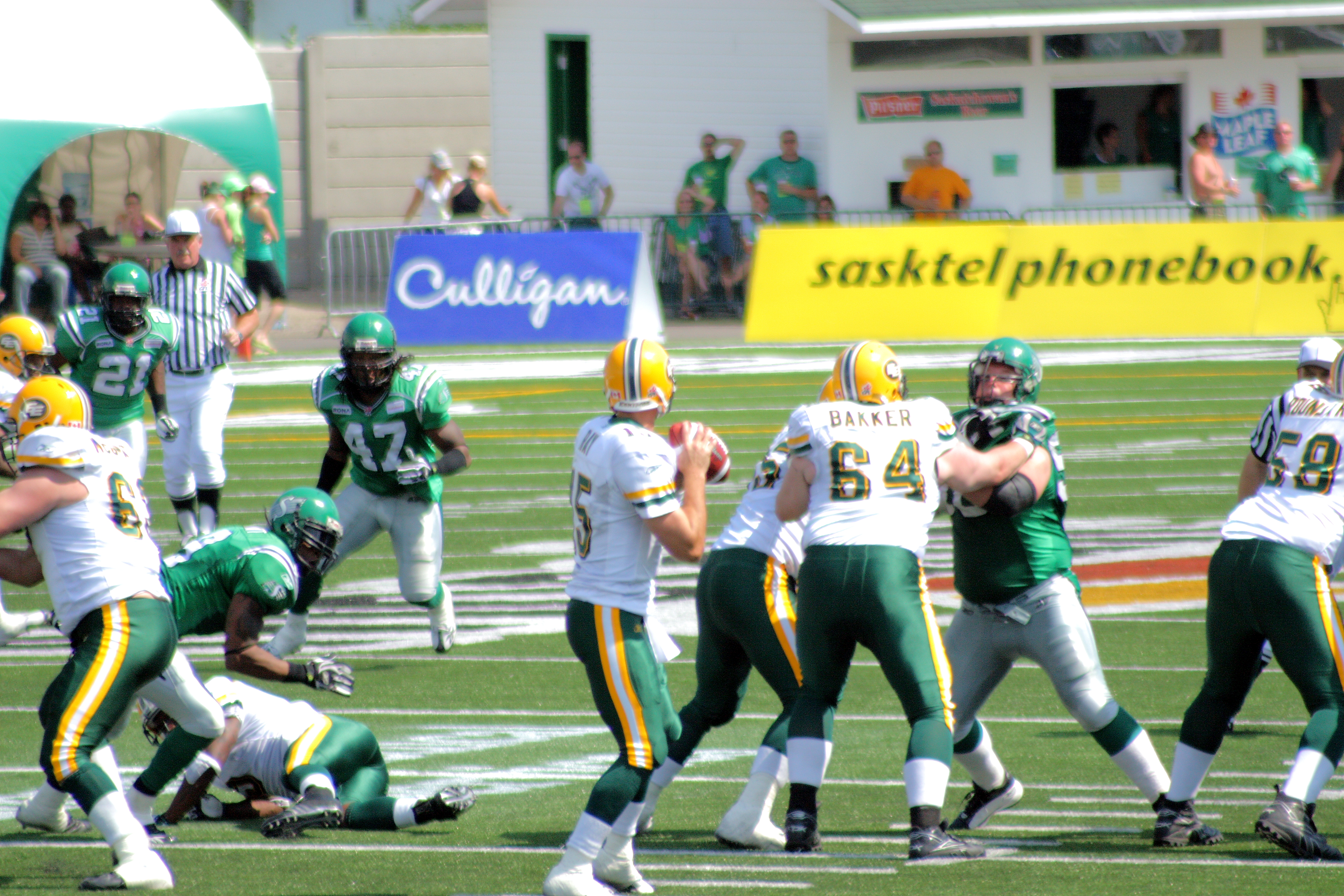
Ray (15) dropping back to pass against the Saskatchewan Roughriders in 2007.

On September 14, 2007, in a win against the Montreal Alouettes, Ray surpassed CFL and NFL hall-of-famer Warren Moon to capture the Eskimos' all-time record for career passing yards. On September 28, 2007, he suffered a separated shoulder at the hands of Toronto Argonauts safety Willie Pile, ending his season. Without Ray, the Eskimos lost their remaining five games and missed the playoffs for the second consecutive season.

In 2008, Ray completed 422 of 608 pass attempts (69.8% completion) for a league-leading, career-best, and single-season Eskimo record 5,661 yards. Ray threw for 26 touchdowns and 17 interceptions for a 101.8 quarterback rating. Ray also scrambled for 258 yards and 5 touchdowns. One of his best games of the season came in the final week of the season vs. the Alouettes when Ray broke the record for highest completion percentage in a single game (with a minimum of 20 passing attempts) when he went 23 of 25 for 92.0% for 302 yards and 2 touchdowns in only 3 quarters of play. He led the Esks to a win in the crossover playoff game in Winnipeg, but the team lost in the East finals to Montreal. The 2008 Eskimos were the first team to ever win a crossover game.

In 2009, Ray completed 401 of 596 pass attempts (67.3% completion) for a league leading 4,916 yards, 22 touchdowns and 12 interceptions for a 96.4 quarterback rating. Ray scrambled for 206 yards and 6 touchdowns. In a game versus the Saskatchewan Roughriders, Ray completed 20 consecutive passes before receiver Jamaica Rector dropped a pass, ending the streak. This remarkable performance left Ray 2nd all time behind teammate Jason Maas (who completed 22 straight passes on July 30, 2004), in the CFL record books for most consecutive pass completions in a single game.

In 2010, Ray completed 288 of 447 pass attempts (64.4% completion) for 3,565 yards, 11 touchdowns and 16 interceptions for an 82.3 quarterback rating. Additionally, Ray scrambled for 302 yards and three touchdowns. In Game 15, Ray had a career rushing performance, compiling 135 yards on 12 rushes and a touchdown. He started 16 of the 18 games. Statistically, it was the worst year of his career.

In 2011, Ray completed 343 of 526 pass attempts (65.2% completion) for 4,954 yards, 24 touchdowns and 11 interceptions for a 99.3 quarterback rating. Additionally, Ray scrambled for 258 yards and 1 touchdown. Ricky Ray had a bounce back season after struggling in 2010. His solid play earned him Offensive Player of the month for the month of September. Ray lead the Eskimos to a record of 11–7, qualifying for the Playoffs.

=== Toronto Argonauts ===
Ray was traded to the Toronto Argonauts on December 12, 2011, for quarterback Steven Jyles, placekicker Grant Shaw, and a 2012 first round draft pick. Ray went on to win the 100th Grey Cup as the Argonauts' starting quarterback. On May 31, 2013, the Argos extended Ray's contract through the 2015 CFL season.

In 2012, Ray completed 321 of 468 pass attempts (68.6% completion) for 4,059 yards, 20 touchdowns and 11 interceptions for a 99.8 quarterback rating. Rays 68.59% completion rate was a new team record breaking the previous mark of 67.25% set by Kerwin Bell in 1998. Ray injured his knee in the third quarter of a Week 4 win against the Blue Bombers. He missed the Week 5 game and then returned to the starting lineup in Week 7, following a bye in Week 6. Ray was averaging over 300 yards passing per game compiling a total of 3,341 yards in his first 11 games before suffering a knee injury in the 1st quarter of a game against Montreal. Ray would return for the final two games of the season completing 20 of 33 passes for 383 yards, 4 touchdowns and no interceptions vs Winnipeg and 24 of 30 passes for 305 yards, 4 touchdowns and 1 interceptions against Saskatchewan, earning offensive player of the week honors for the latter performance and helping the Argos clinch a playoff spot.

In the 2012 East division semi-final Ray completed 23 of 30 passes for 239 yards, 2 touchdowns no interceptions and a rushing touchdown as they defeated Edmonton 42–26. In the process Ray helped the team set a new CFL playoff record for the most points in a single quarter with 31. In the East division final, Ray completed 28 of 37 passes for 399 yards 1 touchdowns and no interceptions as the team beat Montreal on the road 27–20 in advancing to the finals. The Argos would ultimately emerge victorious in the 100th Grey Cup held at home, beating Calgary 35–22. Ray would finish the game 18 for 30 for 231 yards, 2 touchdowns and 1 interception.

In the 2013, Ray had a phenomenal year setting multiple CFL, pro football and team records, despite suffering a shoulder injury in the first quarter of a game against Calgary in Week 7 which forced him to sit out six games. Ray would return before the end of the season helping the Argos clinch first in the east before sitting out the final game of the season.

Ray completed 234 of 303 for 2,878 yards in 10 games and had a 77.23% completion percentage which broke the previous CFL and pro football single season record of 73.98% set by Dave Dickenson in 2005 and his own Argo record of 68.59% set last year. Ray finished with 21 touchdowns and just 2 interceptions, resulting in a 10.5 to 1 touchdown to interception ratio, breaking the single season CFL record of 6 to 1 set by Dave Dickenson in 2000. Ray also set the CFL record for lowest percentage of passes intercepted in a single season with a 0.66% breaking the previous CFL record of 1.09% set by Anthony Calvillo in 2009. Ray had a streak of 222 consecutive pass attempts without throwing an interception to begin the year, going back to the previous year the streak was 247 pass attempts, before throwing his first interception on his last pass of a game in Week 16 against Hamilton. This figure is possibly a CFL record as the Argo team itself set a league record for most consecutive passes without an interception by a team. Ray finished the year with a record passer efficiency rating of 126.37, surpassing the previous pro football record of 122.46 set by Aaron Rodgers in 2011 and the CFL record of 118.77 set by Dave Dickenson in 2005. On July 19, 2013, Ray completed 19 of 20 passes against Winnipeg setting a new single game CFL and pro football completion percentage record of 95.0%, beating the previous record of 94.74% set by Alex Smith in 2012, his own CFL record of 92.0% set in 2008 and the Argos team record of 87.1% set by Condredge Holloway in 1985. In the same game, he tied the Argo record for most consecutive pass completions held by Mike Rae with 17. Only to surpass that mark in his final game of the season against Winnipeg. Ray set a new team record with 21 consecutive pass completions, the second longest such streak in CFL history, falling one shy of the record of 22 held by Jason Maas. In the same game Ray also set a new personal high for passing yards with 505. It was the first time in his career that he had passed for over 500 yards and the third highest single game total in Argos history. Ray did however break a 53-year-old Argo record for most completions in a single game with 39 besting the previous record of 38 set by Tobin Rote in 1960. It was also the 9th time in his career and 2nd time in the year that he had passed for over 400 yards in a game. In addition to the numerous records Ray set, he was named offensive player of the month for September and also named offensive player of week three times. In the first game of the season against Hamilton, Ray complete 24 of 34 passes for 368 yards, 4 touchdowns and no interceptions, earning him offensive player of the week honors. Ray would earn his second offensive player of the week honors after completed 30 of 35 passes for 413 yards with 3 touchdowns and no interceptions against Edmonton in game 6. And lastly for his aforementioned performance against Winnipeg, where he completed 39 of 45 passes for 505 yards, three touchdowns and no interceptions.

In spite of the personal spectacular regular season, Ricky Ray leading the Argonauts to a first-place finish in the East would be ruined by Henry Burris and the Hamilton Tiger-Cats defeating Ray and the Argonauts 36–24 in the 2013 East Division final held at the Rogers Centre, Toronto.

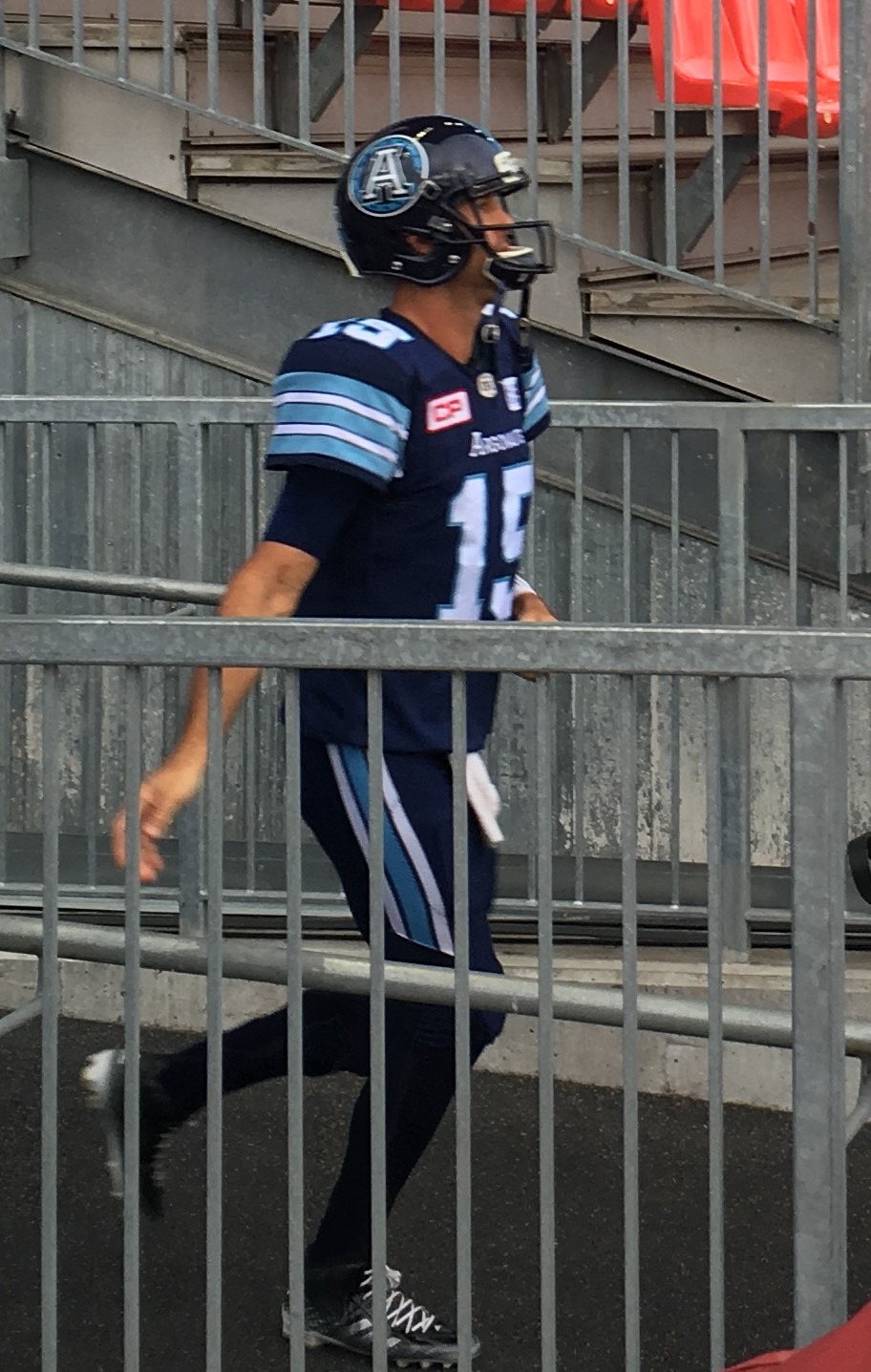
Ray before a home game against the BC Lions in 2017.

Ricky Ray played in all but one of the 18 regular season games during the 2014 CFL season, however the Argos were unable to qualify for the postseason, finishing with a record of 8–10. Ray had one of his highest volume seasons as a passing quarterback in his career during the 2014 campaign. His 425 pass completions was the second highest of his career, trailing only his 2003 season with the Eskimos when he completed 479 passes. Ray attempted 620 passes over the course of the season, which was the 4th most attempts in his career, and the most since 2008. He racked up a league-leading 4,595 passing yards, his most yards in a season since 2009.

In November 2014, following the conclusion of the Argos season, Ray had surgery to repair a torn labrum in his right (throwing) shoulder and a small tear in his right rotator cuff. The recovery time for the surgery was estimated to be around six months, which would allow Ray to return action in time for CFL training camp in the spring of 2015. However, Ray's recovery went slower than expected: As a result, the Argos placed Ray on the six-game injured list during the preseason. Ray missed the first 16 games of the 2015 CFL season, making his first start of the season in Week 19 against the BC Lions. At the time of his return, the Argos were 8–8, having clinched a playoff berth, they were fighting for a home playoff game (which they lost when they were defeated by the Lions). Ray played in the final regular season game and also the Eastern Semi-Final against the Hamilton Tiger-Cats. In the playoff game Ray completed 22 of 34 pass attempts for 220 yards with 1 touchdown and 1 interception; however Justin Medlock kicked a 47-yard field goal with no time on the clock to eliminate the Argos, thus ending their season. On December 3, 2015, Ray and the Argos agreed on a contract extension; preventing him from becoming a free-agent in February 2015. Entering the 2016 season Ray was finally 100% healed from his shoulder injury which had plagued him since November 2014. Ray started the first five games of the season before sustaining a knee injury as defensive lineman Vaughn Martin rolled up into him in the third quarter. Following the game Ricky Ray was diagnosed with a sprained MCL, and was expected to miss between three and six weeks. Ray missed three games over the following five weeks before returning to play in the Labour Day weekend games against the BC Lions and Hamilton Tiger-Cats. Following their Labour Day game against the Tiger-Cats, reports surfaced suggesting Ray would miss the remainder of the 2016 CFL season with a punctured lung. The following day, it was announced that Ray would miss between four and six weeks with a partially deflated lung. This was Ray's second significant injury in 2016 and he has only played one full season since 2011. After missing six weeks recovering from a partially deflated lung Ray returned to the starting lineup in Week 18 of the regular season. However, he was unable to best the league-leading Stampeders and as a result the Argos were eliminated from playoff contention, falling to a record of 5–12.

On February 28, 2017, at his introductory press conference, newly appointed head coach Marc Trestman declared Ray the Argos starting quarterback for the 2017 season: Despite Ray having only started 12 games over the previous two seasons. In the opening game of the season, Ray threw for a career-high 506 yards in a 32–15 win over the rival Tiger-Cats. On July 29, 2017, Ray surpassed Condredge Holloway to become the franchise leader in passing yards. Holloway threw for 16,616 yards between 1981 and 1986. On August 19, 2017, Ray became the Argonauts' all-time passing touchdown leader with his 99th touchdown pass, surpassing Holloway's 98. In that same game, he threw for his 100th touchdown pass as an Argonaut, becoming the first player in CFL history to throw at least 100 touchdown passes for two franchises. On October 21, 2017, Ray reached the 60,000 career passing-yard mark, becoming just the fourth player in CFL history to accomplish the milestone. In that same game, he also hit 5,000 passing yards for the season, joining Doug Flutie and Anthony Calvillo as the only players to pass for 5,000 yards at least four times in their careers. That game also marked the 12th time he eclipsed the 300-yard mark that season, which is an Argonauts record. The Argonauts finished the season 1st in the East with a 9–9 record, the only .500 team in the division. For his performance, Ray finished as runner-up to Edmonton quarterback Mike Reilly for the CFL's Most Outstanding Player Award. He would go on and win his fourth Grey Cup against the Calgary Stampeders in the 105th Grey Cup game. His four Grey Cups wins are most in CFL history for a starting quarterback. One day after the Argos Grey Cup parade, Ray conveyed to reporters that he was "seriously considering retirement". Ray, 38 years of age, who was a pending free agent for the 2018 season, said there was no timetable for a decision. On February 2, 2018, Ray and the Argos agreed to a one-year contract extension.

In 2018, Ray was carted off the field in the second half of the Argos Week 2 loss to the Calgary Stampeders after being awkwardly tackled between a pair of Stampeder defensive linemen. Ray was hospitalized, and the following day the team confirmed that Ray did indeed have feeling in all of his extremities. Given his age (38), and the severity of the injury, Ray's future as a quarterback was placed in doubt. Only a couple days later team doctors advised Ray to not play again in 2018. On September 24, 2018, Head Coach Marc Trestman confirmed that Ray would not return to the Argos for the 2018 season. In early November 2018 Ray was still considering his options, leaving the door open for a possible return in 2019. By early March Ray had not informed the Argos of his intentions for the 2019 season, and still needed to be cleared by doctors before returning to the field. General manager Jim Popp hinted that if Ray were to return to the Argos it would be as a backup quarterback, possibly transitioning to a coaching role in the future. On May 8, 2019, Ray held a press conference to officially announce his retirement.

Ray was announced as a member of the Canadian Football Hall of Fame 2022 class on June 21, 2022.

== Career statistics ==
=== CFL ===
==== Regular season ====
Year	Team	Games			Passing							Rushing					Fumbles
Year	Team	GD	GS	Record	Cmp	Att	Pct	Yds	TD	Int	Rtg	Att	Yds	Avg	Lng	TD	Fum
2002	EDM	18	11	8–3	227	359	63.2	2,991	24	9	101.3	44	232	5.3	32	1	9
2003	EDM	18	18	13–5	348	515	67.6	4,640	35	13	108.1	62	352	5.7	35	2	9
2005	EDM	18	18	11–7	479	715	67.0	5,510	25	24	87.7	83	353	4.3	26	9	13
2006	EDM	18	18	7–11	406	618	65.7	5,000	21	18	89.7	92	469	5.1	27	9	6
2007	EDM	13	13	5–7–1	311	445	69.9	3,652	22	10	101.6	41	232	5.7	26	0	8
2008	EDM	18	18	10–8	422	605	69.8	5,663	26	17	101.8	75	258	3.4	15	5	13
2009	EDM	18	18	9–9	401	596	67.3	4,916	22	12	96.4	47	206	4.4	27	6	3
2010	EDM	17	16	5–11	288	448	64.3	3,565	11	16	82.1	36	302	8.4	45	3	9
2011	EDM	18	18	11–7	343	526	65.2	4,594	24	11	99.3	41	258	6.3	27	1	13
2012	TOR	14	14	7–7	321	468	68.6	4,059	20	11	99.8	17	84	4.9	12	0	7
2013	TOR	11	10	6–4	234	303	77.2	2,878	21	2	126.4	11	61	5.5	18	2	3
2014	TOR	17	17	7–10	425	620	68.5	4,595	28	15	95.1	41	216	5.3	15	1	5
2015	TOR	9	2	1–1	47	65	72.3	423	2	1	93.3	2	5	2.5	4	0	1
2016	TOR	9	9	3–6	222	298	74.5	2,397	15	6	106.1	14	54	3.9	19	0	1
2017	TOR	17	17	9–8	474	668	71.0	5,546	28	11	102.9	8	52	6.5	10	0	7
2018	TOR	2	2	0–2	34	54	63.0	307	0	1	70.5	1	8	8.0	8	0	0
CFL totals		235	219	112–106–1	4,982	7,303	68.2	60,736	324	177	98.3	615	3,142	5.1	45	39	107

==== Playoffs ====
Year & game	Team	GP	GS	ATT	COMP	YD	TD	INT	RUSH	YD	TD
2002 West Final	EDM	1	1	34	19	269	1	1	5	24	0
2003 West Final	EDM	1	1	32	23	358	1	0	7	49	1
2005 West Semi-Final	EDM	1	1	21	12	99	0	0	2	12	0
2005 West Final	EDM	1	1	28	17	207	0	1	8	17	2
2008 *East Semi-Final	EDM	1	1	37	27	303	0	0	4	25	0
2008 *East Final	EDM	1	1	49	26	339	1	0	0	-	-
2009 West Semi-Final	EDM	1	1	30	18	162	0	0	4	17	1
2011 West Semi-Final	EDM	1	1	27	19	245	1	0	3	31	0
2011 West Final	EDM	1	1	40	21	297	2	2	3	36	0
2012 East Semi-Final	TOR	1	1	30	23	239	2	2	3	16	1
2012 East Final	TOR	1	1	37	28	399	1	1	1	3	0
2013 East Final	TOR	1	1	32	22	329	2	0	1	6	0
2015 East Semi-Final	TOR	1	1	34	22	220	1	1	3	15	0
2017 East Final	TOR	1	1	39	28	266	1	1	0	-	-
Totals		14	14	470	303	3,732	13	9	44	251	5

*team qualified for crossover

==== Grey Cup ====
Year	Team	GP	GS	ATT	COMP	YD	TD	INT	RUSH	YD	TD
2002	EDM	1	1	46	24	324	2	1	7	25	0
2003	EDM	1	1	32	22	301	2	0	7	13	1
2005	EDM	1	1	45	35	359	2	0	4	18	1
2012	TOR	1	1	30	18	231	2	1	0	-	-
2017	TOR	1	1	32	19	297	1	0	0	-	-
Totals		5	5	185	118	1,512	9	2	18	56	2

==== AF2 ====
Year	Team	Games			Passing								Rushing			
Year	Team	GP	GS	Record	Cmp	Att	Pct	Yds	Y/A	TD	Int	Rtg	Att	Yds	Avg	TD
2002	Fresno	8	8	3–5	130	225	57.8	1,555	6.9	32	6	103.5	26	99	3.8	7
Career		8	8	3–5	130	225	57.8	1,555	6.9	32	6	103.5	26	99	3.8	7

=== College ===
==== CCCAA ====
Year	Team	GP	Passing								Rushing			
Year	Team	GP	Cmp	Att	Pct	Yds	Y/A	TD	Int	Rtg	Att	Yds	Avg	TD
1997	Shasta	10	162	281	57.7	1,873	6.7	17	11	125.8	38	–78	–0.5	2
1998	Shasta	10	189	307	61.6	2,759	9.0	28	7	162.6	72	116	1.6	7
CCCAA career		20	351	588	59.7	4,632	7.9	45	18	145.9	110	38	0.3	9

==== NCAA Division I-AA ====
Year	Team	GP	Passing								Rushing			
Year	Team	GP	Cmp	Att	Pct	Yds	Y/A	TD	Int	Rtg	Att	Yds	Avg	TD
1999	SAC ST	10	182	291	62.5	2,422	8.3	20	8	149.6	51	58	1.1	5
2000	SAC ST	11	168	270	62.2	2,200	8.1	13	6	142.1	100	189	1.9	10
NCAA career		21	350	561	62.3	4,622	8.2	33	14	145.5	151	247	1.6	15

== See also ==
- List of Canadian Football League records (individual)
- List of gridiron football quarterbacks passing statistics
