= Kevin Bradfield =

Canadian football player (born 1993)

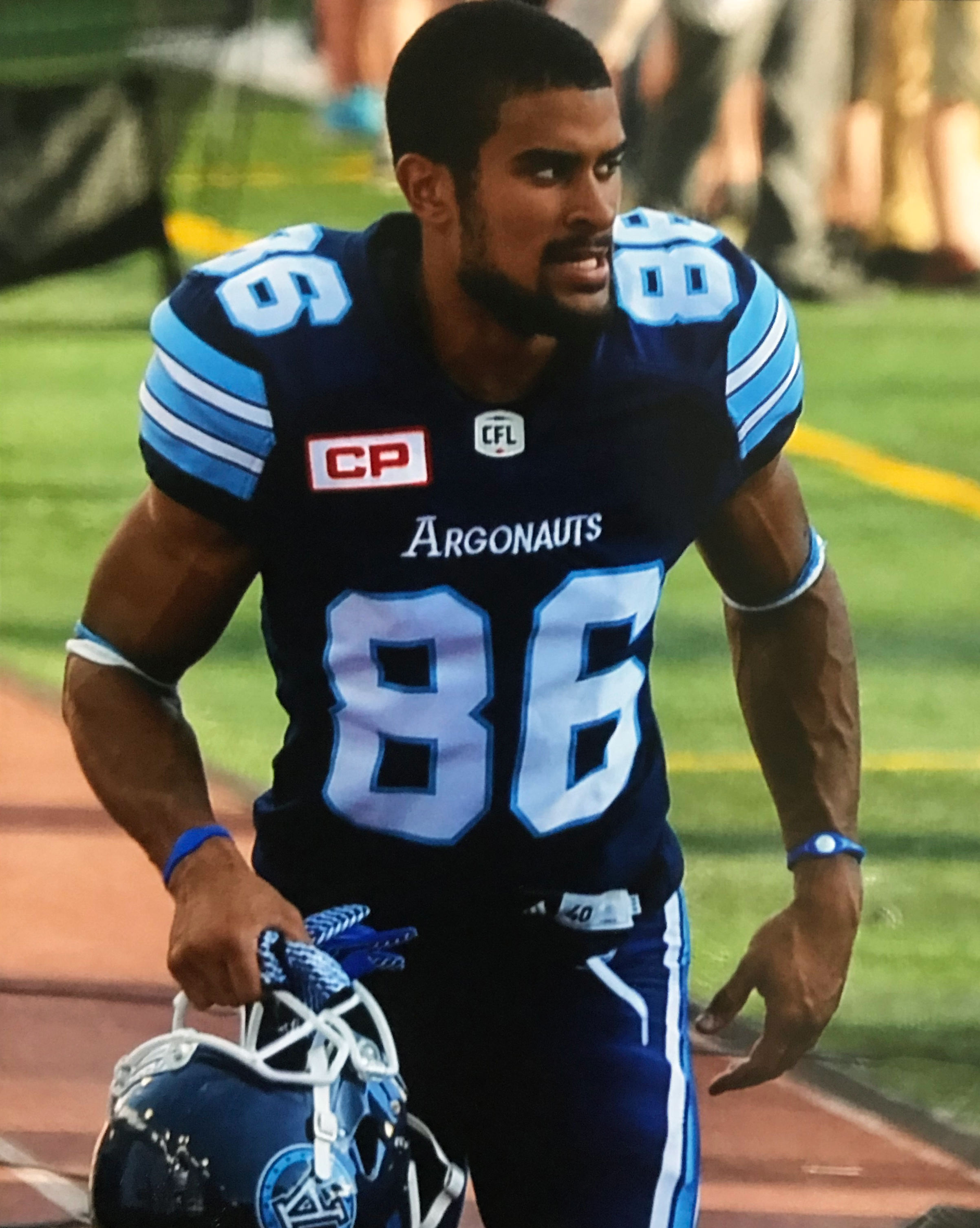
- Bradfield with the Toronto Argonauts

No. 86
- Position: Wide receiver

Personal information
- Born: March 19, 1993 (age 33); Toronto, Ontario, Canada
- Listed height: 6 ft 1 in (1.85 m)
- Listed weight: 190 lb (86 kg)

Career information
- College: Toronto
- NFL draft: 2015: 7th round, 55th overall pick

Career history
- Toronto Argonauts (2015–2016)
- Stats at CFL.ca

Kevin Jalao Bradfield (born March 19, 1993) is a Canadian former professional football wide receiver who played for the Toronto Argonauts of the Canadian Football League (CFL). He was selected by the Argonauts in the seventh round of the 2015 CFL draft. He played CIS football at the University of Toronto from 2011 to 2014.

== Early life ==
Bradfield was born in Toronto, Ontario, Canada. He started his football career in high school at Woodbridge College, where he was a York Region and GTA all star at quarterback and safety. In high school, Bradfield was named the most valuable player of the basketball, football, volleyball, baseball, and tennis teams.

Bradfield was also an Ontario Varsity Football League (OVFL) all-star receiver as a member of the Etobicoke Eagles.

== College career ==
Bradfield went on to play four seasons of college football for the Toronto Varsity Blues. In 2012, Bradfield led the OUA and CIS in kick return yardage. In 2013, Bradfield set the University of Toronto all time record for most punt return yardage in a single season (734). That statistic also etched Bradfield into the CIS record book at 6th all time for punt return yards in a single season (734). That same year he was named a CIS first-team All-Canadian and OUA All-Star at returner. In 2014, Bradfield finished the year with 48 receptions for 603 yards, rushed 15 times for 100 yards, while adding 498 kick return yards on 37 returns. Bradfield finished his college career as the Toronto Varsity Blues all time record holder for most punt return yardage in a career (1287). Bradfield also goes down in the Toronto Varsity Blues record books as second all time in kickoff return yardage in both a single season and career.

== Professional career ==
Bradfield was selected by the Toronto Argonauts in the seventh round, with the 55th overall, of the 2015 CFL draft, and signed with the club on May 22, 2015. In his first season he played in 8 regular season games, recording 5 kickoff returns for 80 yards, and one special teams tackle. He made his postseason debut in the team’s East Division semi-final loss to the Hamilton Tiger-Cats on November 15, 2015. In 2016, Bradfield played in 6 regular season games, recording four special teams tackles and one reception for 4 yards.
