= 2010 Edmonton Eskimos season =

Canadian football team season

- General manager: Danny Maciocia - 1-4-0 (Jun-Jul); Paul Jones - 1-4-0 (Aug-Sep); Eric Tillman - 5-3-0 (Sep-Nov)
- Head coach: Richie Hall
- Home stadium: Commonwealth Stadium

Results
- Record: 7–11
- Division place: 4th, West
- Playoffs: did not qualify
- Team MOP: Fred Stamps, WR
- Team MOC: Calvin McCarty, RB
- Team MOR: Daniel Porter, RB

Uniform

The 2010 Edmonton Eskimos season was the 53rd season for the team in the Canadian Football League (CFL) and their 62nd overall. After the Eskimos lost the final game of the season, they were eliminated from playoff contention, despite winning five of their last seven games.

This is also the first time since 2004 that a Grey Cup host city has failed to qualify for the playoffs.

== Off-season ==
=== CFL draft ===
Round	Pick	Player	Position	School/Club team
1	6	Brian Bulcke	DL	Stanford
2	12	Saleem Borhot	DB	Saint Mary's
5	35	Scott Ferguson	OL	St. Cloud State
6	43	Corbin Sharun	QB	St. Francis Xavier

=== Notable transactions ===
Date	Type	Incoming	Outgoing	Team
February 10, 2010	Trade	Andre Talbot (WR); Brad Smith (WR)	Eric Taylor (DL); *4th round pick in 2011 CFL draft – Renaldo Sagesse (DL)	Toronto Argonauts
February 16, 2010	Trade	Chris Thompson (DB)	Maurice Mann (WR)	Hamilton Tiger-Cats
May 2, 2010	Trade	2nd round pick in 2010 CFL draft – Saleem Borhot (DB)	3rd round pick in 2010 CFL draft – Samuel Fournier (RB); 4th round pick in 2010 CFL draft – Chris Rwabukamba (DB)	Hamilton Tiger-Cats
May 2, 2010	Trade	1st round pick in 2010 CFL draft – Brian Bulcke (DL)	2nd round pick in 2010 CFL draft – Cory Watson (WR); **3rd round pick in 2010 CFL draft – Eddie Steele (DT)	Winnipeg Blue Bombers
September 7, 2010	Trade	Kelly Bates (OL)	Draft pick in 2014 CFL draft	Saskatchewan Roughriders
October 12, 2010	Trade	Étienne Légaré (DL); Damaso Munoz (LB)	Noel Prefontaine (K/P)	Toronto Argonauts

*Later traded to the Montreal Alouettes
**Later traded to the Hamilton Tiger-Cats

=== Pre-season ===
#	Date	Visitor	Score	Home	OT	Attendance	Record
A	June 13	Calgary Stampeders	23–21	Edmonton Eskimos		33,708	0–1
B	June 20	Edmonton Eskimos	36–32	BC Lions		24,763	1–1

== Regular season ==
=== Standings ===
West Division
Team	GP	W	L	T	PF	PA	Pts	
Calgary Stampeders	18	13	5	0	626	459	26	Details
Saskatchewan Roughriders	18	10	8	0	497	488	20	Details
BC Lions	18	8	10	0	466	466	16	Details
Edmonton Eskimos	18	7	11	0	382	545	14	Details

=== Season schedule ===
The September 26 game was played in Moncton, New Brunswick where the Argonauts were the designated home team.

#	Date	Visitor	Score	Home	OT	Attendance	Record	Pts
1	July 4	BC Lions	25–10	Edmonton Eskimos		32,439	0–1	0
2	July 11	Montreal Alouettes	33–23	Edmonton Eskimos		30,442	0–2	0
3	July 17	Edmonton Eskimos	20–24	Saskatchewan Roughriders		30,048	0–3	0
4	July 24	Edmonton Eskimos	21–47	Winnipeg Blue Bombers		26,041	0–4	0
5	July 30	BC Lions	25–28	Edmonton Eskimos		32,281	1–4	2
6	Aug 6	Toronto Argonauts	29–28	Edmonton Eskimos		31,888	1–5	2
7	Aug 15	Edmonton Eskimos	15–56	Calgary Stampeders		30,242	1–6	2
8	Bye						1–6	2
9	Aug 28	Saskatchewan Roughriders	14–17	Edmonton Eskimos		47,829	2–6	4
10	Sept 6	Edmonton Eskimos	5–52	Calgary Stampeders		34,559	2–7	4
11	Sept 10	Calgary Stampeders	36–20	Edmonton Eskimos		35,349	2–8	4
12	Sept 19	Edmonton Eskimos	14–31	Montreal Alouettes		25,012	2–9	4
13	Sept 26	Edmonton Eskimos	24–6	Toronto Argonauts		20,725	3–9	6
14	Oct 3	Hamilton Tiger-Cats	35–37	Edmonton Eskimos		34,479	4–9	8
15	Oct 8	Edmonton Eskimos	11–36	Hamilton Tiger-Cats		20,791	4–10	8
16	Oct 16	Edmonton Eskimos	31–28	BC Lions	OT	21,414	5–10	10
17	Oct 23	Saskatchewan Roughriders	24–39	Edmonton Eskimos		38,325	6–10	12
18	Oct 30	Winnipeg Blue Bombers	13–16	Edmonton Eskimos	OT	32,192	7–10	14
19	Nov 6	Edmonton Eskimos	23–31	Saskatchewan Roughriders		30,048	7–11	14

Total attendance: 315,224
Average attendance: 35,205 (58.8%)

== Roster ==
2010 Edmonton Eskimos final roster
Quarterbacks: 12 Jason Maas; 15 Ricky Ray; 5 Jared Zabransky; Running backs: 30 Mathieu Bertrand; 28 Samuel Fournier; 31 Calvin McCarty; 32 Daniel Porter; Receivers: 3 Jason Armstead; 84 Derick Armstrong; 88 Andrew Nowacki; 85 Jamaica Rector; 86 Brad Smith; 2 Fred Stamps; 9 Andre Talbot	Offensive linemen: 63 Patrick Afif T; 52 Kelly Bates G; 51 Aaron Fiacconi C; 57 Gord Hinse C/T; 56 Patrick Kabongo G; 61 Kyle Koch G/C; 50 Adam Rogers G; 66 Greg Wojt T; Defensive linemen: 91 Adam Braidwood DT; 97 Justin Cooper DE; 95 Étienne Légaré DT; 90 Greg Peach DE; 99 Kenny Pettway DE; 94 Dario Romero DT	Linebackers: 40 Rod Davis; 6 Javier Glatt; 18 T. J. Hill; 47 Maurice Lloyd; 44 Mark Restelli; 48 Tim St. Pierre LS; Defensive backs: 35 Weldon Brown; 10 Randee Drew; 19 Lawrence Gordon; 4 Jason Goss; 13 Jason Nugent; 11 Elliott Richardson; 39 Corbin Sharun; 29 Chris Thompson	Special teams: 17 Derek Schiavone K/P; Reserve roster: 93 Kai Ellis DE; 78 Walter Curry DT; 7 Justin Medlock K/P; Practice roster: 82 Nate Binder WR; 34 Pascal Fils RB; 58 Antonio Hall T; 70 Efrem Hill WR; 65 Neil Puffer LS; 80 Tyler Scott WR; 72 Mike Stadnyk DE; 37 Rod Williams DB	Injured list: 81 Jason Barnes SB (9 Game); 24 Graeme Bell FB (9 Game); 92 Larry Birdine DE (1 Game); 23 Saleem Borhot DB (9 Game); 71 Kelly Campbell SB (1 Game); 22 Chris Ciezki FB (9 Game); 87 Skyler Green SB (9 Game); 25 Will Harris LB (1 Game); 38 Tristan Jackson DB (9 Game); 14 Kerry Joseph QB (1 Game); 89 Tremayne Kirkland SB (9 Game); 33 Brad Lester RB (1 Game); 69 Jeremy Parquet T (1 Game); 8 Kamau Peterson SB (9 Game); 96 Dee Sterling DT (9 Game); 27 Lenny Walls DB (9 Game); 36 Arkee Whitlock RB (9 Game); Suspended: Un'tavious Scott DE; Italics indicate International player

== Statistics ==
As of the end of Week 13 (Game 12):

=== Passing ===
Player	Att	Comp	%	Yards	TD	INT	Rating
Ricky Ray	447	288	64.4	3565	11	16	82.3
Jared Zabransky	104	53	51.0	609	4	10	41.7
Jason Maas	23	10	43.5	128	0	2	25.3
Noel Prefontaine	1	1	100.0	5	0	0	106.3
Fred Stamps	1	0	0.0	0	0	0	2.1

=== Rushing ===
Player	Att	Yards	Avg.	TD	Fumbles
Arkee Whitlock	118	689	5.8	4	0
Daniel Porter	86	603	7.0	2	0
Calvin McCarty	62	287	4.6	3	3
Ricky Ray	37	302	8.2	3	9
Jared Zabransky	28	209	7.5	1	4
Brad Lester	16	96	6.0	0	1
Kelly Campbell	5	37	7.4	0	0
Mathieu Bertrand	6	17	2.8	2	2

=== Receiving ===
Player	No.	Yards	Avg.	Long	TD
Fred Stamps	80	1223	15.3	51	5
Kelly Campbell	63	801	12.7	46	1
Jason Barnes	35	608	17.4	70	3
Andre Talbot	27	301	11.1	40	1
Calvin McCarty	36	278	7.7	22	2
Andrew Nowacki	21	259	12.3	49	0
Jamaica Rector	18	204	11.3	29	0
Derick Armstrong	11	121	11.0	28	1

== Awards ==
=== 2010 CFL All-Stars ===
Chris Thompson

=== CFL Western All-Stars ===
- WR – Fred Stamps, CFL Western All-Star
- DB – Chris Thompson, CFL Western All-Star

== Playoffs ==
After finishing last in the West division, the Eskimos failed to qualify for the 2010 CFL playoffs.
