= Calvin McCarty =

American gridiron football player and coach (born 1984)

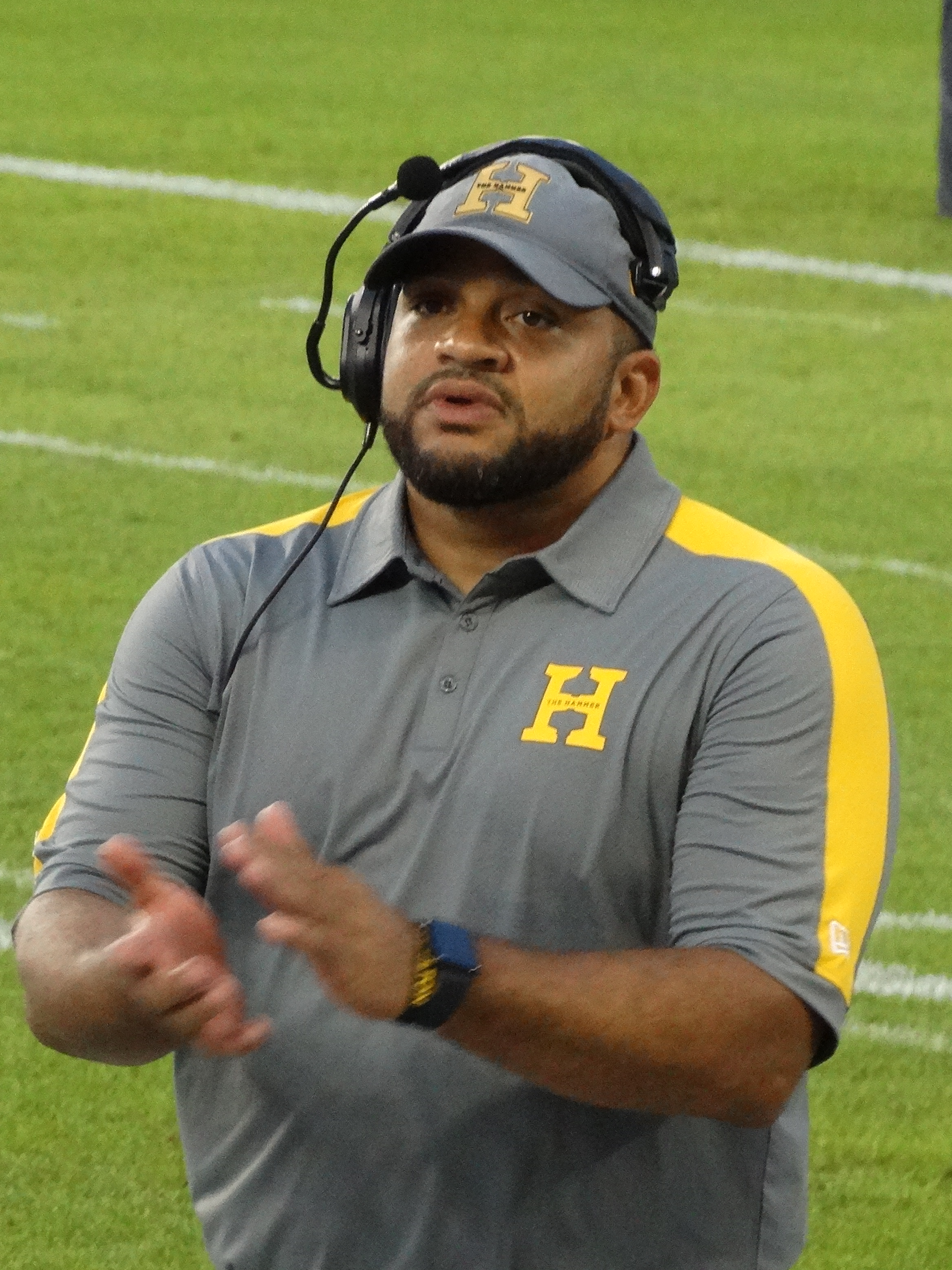
- McCarty with the Hamilton Tiger-Cats in 2024

No. 31
- Position: Fullback

Personal information
- Born: November 2, 1984 (age 42); Muskogee, Oklahoma, U.S.
- Listed height: 5 ft 10 in (1.78 m)
- Listed weight: 215 lb (98 kg)

Career information
- High school: Burnaby (BC) St. Thomas More
- College: Western Washington
- CFL draft: 2007: 4th round, 27th overall pick

Career history

Playing
- 2007–2021: Edmonton Eskimos
- 2021: Calgary Stampeders

Coaching
- 2024: Hamilton Tiger-Cats (Running backs coach)

Awards and highlights
- Grey Cup champion (2015); Canadian Player of the Month (July 2009); 3× Canadian Player of the Week; Most Outstanding Canadian Player nominee (2010)
- Stats at CFL.ca

Calvin McCarty (born November 2, 1984) is an American former professional football fullback who played in the Canadian Football League (CFL). He played as a tailback until 2014, when he became the starting fullback for the Edmonton Eskimos. McCarty was known for being able to fill many roles at his position, with TSN sportscaster Chris Schultz noting in 2010 that he is a "multi-purpose running back who catches the ball extremely well, blocks well and runs well". He is a Grey Cup champion after winning with the Edmonton Eskimos in 2015. He has also served as the running backs coach for the Hamilton Tiger-Cats.

Prior to being drafted by the Eskimos in the fourth round of the 2007 CFL draft, McCarty played high school football for the St. Thomas More Knights, where he broke multiple school records. He later played college football for the Western Washington Vikings. With the Vikings, McCarty developed into a dual threat, being used heavily as a rusher and receiver. McCarty spent the majority of his professional career with the Eskimos.

== Early life ==
McCarty played high school football for the St. Thomas More Knights in Burnaby, British Columbia beginning in 1998, playing as both a running back and middle linebacker on the Grade 8 team. He quickly became a key player on the team, including rushing for 185 yards and four touchdowns while adding 10 defensive tackles in the Grade 8 provincial semi-finals on November 24 against the Handsworth Royals. For that performance, he was named "Star of the Week" by The Vancouver Sun. The Knights went on to defeat the Vancouver College Fighting Irish 48–0 in the Grade 8 B.C. championship game, where McCarty scored another three touchdowns.

The following year, McCarty joined the senior team at St. Thomas More, skipping the junior team entirely. He continued in his role as a running back while switching to the secondary defensively. Despite being a rare Grade 9 player on the senior team, he was one of the Knights' two leading rushers that year. McCarty scored a touchdown in the AAA B.C. championship game, helping the Knights win their first senior title as they beat the Pinetree T-Wolves 29–6. While K.C. Steele, the Knights' coach, has a policy of not recording player statistics, it is estimated that McCarty finished 1999 with over 1,000 rushing yards and 15 touchdowns.

In 2000, McCarty played a significant role in the Knights' rushing and return game. He rushed for 150 yards and three touchdowns against the Burnaby Central Wildcats in the annual Burnaby Bowl, adding two punt returns for touchdowns. By the end of October, the Knights had compiled a perfect 6–0 record, and defensive coordinator and former CFL defensive back Lou Deslauriers called McCarty "the best player for his age and talent that we've ever had at our school". He recorded 238 yards and four consecutive touchdowns with only 23 carries in the Knights' 46–12 victory over the W. J. Mouat Hawks in the AAA championship game. For his role in earning the Knights their second AAA title, McCarty was named the game's MVP, becoming the youngest player to earn this award.

McCarty remained a presence on the field for the Knights in 2001, expanding his role by playing some snaps as a fullback. He rushed for 160 yards in that year's Burnaby Bowl, including three touchdowns as a halfback and one as a fullback. McCarty had another notable performance in a 67–7 blowout against the South Delta Sun Devils, running for 200 yards and three touchdowns. He also showed himself to be a capable receiver, including making five catches for 66 yards in a match against the Holy Cross Crusaders. McCarty also finished that game with 110 yards and two touchdowns on only three carries. Despite giving up only 19 points during the entire regular season, the Knights lost 32–26 in the quarter-finals of the playoffs against the Centennial Centaurs after McCarty was stopped one yard away from the endzone on the last play of the game.

As a senior, McCarty recorded 2,400 yards and scored 33 touchdowns in just nine games, averaging 266.7 yards and over three touchdowns per game. He ran for 380 yards and three touchdowns in a 21–20 loss against the W. J. Mouat Hawks in the quarter-finals of the AAA playoffs. He was named the 2002 Provincial Player of the Year for his performance and finished his four-year AAA career at St. Thomas More with 84 touchdowns, breaking a school record.

=== Other sports ===
McCarty played basketball and baseball during high school as well. He lettered in basketball with the Knights. At the 2001 Big League World Series, McCarty played for Team Canada as a shortstop and center fielder, helping the team to third place in the international competition. Despite being skilled as a baseball player, McCarty chose football over professional baseball due to the physicality of the former sport.

== College career ==
=== Boise State ===
McCarty originally committed to Boise State University and played for the Broncos. In 2003, he was given redshirt status and did not play. McCarty played a limited role the following year, but capitalized on the opportunities he was given, rushing for 104 yards on only 10 carries. His only touchdown came on a 7-yard carry in the October 24 game against the Fresno State Bulldogs. The Bulldogs finished with an 11–1 season in 2004.

=== Reedley ===
McCarty transferred to Reedley College and played for the Tigers in 2005. He ended the season with 620 rushing yards, 500 receiving yards, and 14 touchdowns, as the Tigers earned a 10–1 record along their way to the Central Valley Conference championship title. McCarty also played baseball at Reedley.

=== Western Washington ===
After his single season at Reedley, McCarty transferred to Western Washington University and played football for the Vikings. McCarty was immediately a significant factor in the Vikings' gameplan. In the season opener, he rushed for 139 yards and three touchdowns on 30 carries against the Humboldt State Lumberjacks. He also played a large role in the passing game early in the season, making eight receptions for 126 yards through the first two games. After starting the first seven games for the Vikings, McCarty broke his foot in a game against the South Dakota Hardrockers. At the time of his injury, he led the Vikings in rushing and receiving yards. He finished the season with 492 rushing yards and five touchdowns on 130 carries, as well as 30 receptions for 278 yards. McCarty was also named a second-team all-star of the North Central Conference.

== Professional career ==
=== Edmonton Eskimos ===
Following his only season at Western Washington, McCarty declared himself eligible for the 2007 CFL draft. He was selected in the fourth round of the draft by the Edmonton Eskimos with the 27th overall pick. He was re-signed on December 19, 2008 to a multiple-year contract, and again following the 2011 season.

==== 2007 season ====
McCarty made the active roster and played in all 18 regular season games his rookie season. He was used in the passing game and on the special teams, finishing with seven receptions for 99 yards and a touchdown as well as five special-teams tackles. McCarty made his CFL debut on June 28 in the season opener against the Winnipeg Blue Bombers. He received his first carry and reception in a Week 10 game against the Calgary Stampeders, where he was given two carries for one yard and caught one reception for 10 yards.

==== 2008 season ====
McCarty played a larger role in his second season with the Eskimos, especially as a receiver. On September 1 in a match against the Stampeders, starting running back A. J. Harris was injured, and McCarty rushed for 73 yards on 12 carries as a backup. Filling in again for the injured Harris on September 13 against the Montreal Alouettes, McCarty was named Canadian Player of the Week for the first time with 72 yards on only 9 carries and a touchdown. Receiving his first start of his career on October 4, McCarty rushed for 88 yards on 19 carries with a touchdown along with eight catches for 80 yards, earning him another Canadian Player of the Week award. He played in all 18 games and started three times in his second year, finishing with 490 yards and four touchdowns on 88 carries. He had 70 catches, the second-highest amount among running backs. He also continued his role on the special teams, ending the season with 11 special-teams tackles. During the season, head coach Danny Maciocia referred to McCarty as "the best fourth-round pick he'd ever been associated with".

==== 2009 season ====
McCarty split time with Arkee Whitlock in 2009. He rushed for two touchdowns in Week 4, being named the Canadian Player of the Week for the third time. He was also named the Canadian Player of the Month in July after continuing to play a large role in the rushing game. In August, McCarty injured his hamstring in a game against the Stampeders and missed several games. He briefly returned in mid-September before being sidelined again with recurring hamstring issues until late October. In Week 19, McCarty ran for 81 yards and a touchdown off of 10 carries, helping the Eskimos defeat the BC Lions in a 45–13 blowout. Despite having his season sidetracked by injuries, McCarty finished 2009 with 348 rushing yards and five touchdowns on 67 attempts, as well as seven special-teams tackles. He saw a significantly smaller role as a receiver, catching 20 passes for only 124 yards.

==== 2010 season ====
McCarty remained in a multi-purpose role in 2010 and was utilized more frequently in the passing game compared to the previous season. He made a reception for a first down following a fake punt in Week 6. He missed two games later in the season due to a hand injury. In a September 26 game against the Toronto Argonauts, McCarty rushed for 84 yards on 10 carries and two fourth-quarter touchdowns, including a 46-yard breakaway. McCarty was utilized about equally on the ground and in the air, ending his season with 287 rushing yards on 62 carries and 278 receiving yards on 36 catches as well as five total touchdowns. He continued to play on the special teams where he made eight tackles. He started in six of the 15 games he played, and the Eskimos nominated him for Most Outstanding Canadian.

==== 2011 season ====
In 2011, the Eskimos utilized a committee of running backs, with McCarty, Daniel Porter, and Jerome Messam all receiving significant playing time. McCarty was used mostly in short-yardage situations on the ground, while also being active as a receiver and on special teams. He played in 18 games, made eight starts, and finished with 209 yards on 52 carries with no touchdowns. He also caught 22 passes for 150 yards and a touchdown. McCarty played in both of the Eskimos' playoff games. In the West Semi-Finals against the Stampeders, he rushed for a goal-line touchdown, in addition to making three receptions and two special-teams tackles. McCarty played a more limited role in the West Finals against the BC Lions, where he was given only one carry for six yards, made one tackle on special teams, and caught two passes for a total of four yards.

==== 2012 season ====
McCarty played a limited role in 2012, both due to injuries and competition from other backs, including Cory Boyd, Hugh Charles, and Jerome Messam. McCarty missed six games due to a high ankle sprain suffered during the Labour Day Rematch. Playing in the other 12 games but starting in none, McCarty rushed only 12 times and made five receptions with a lone rushing touchdown. He added four special-teams tackles.

==== 2013 season ====
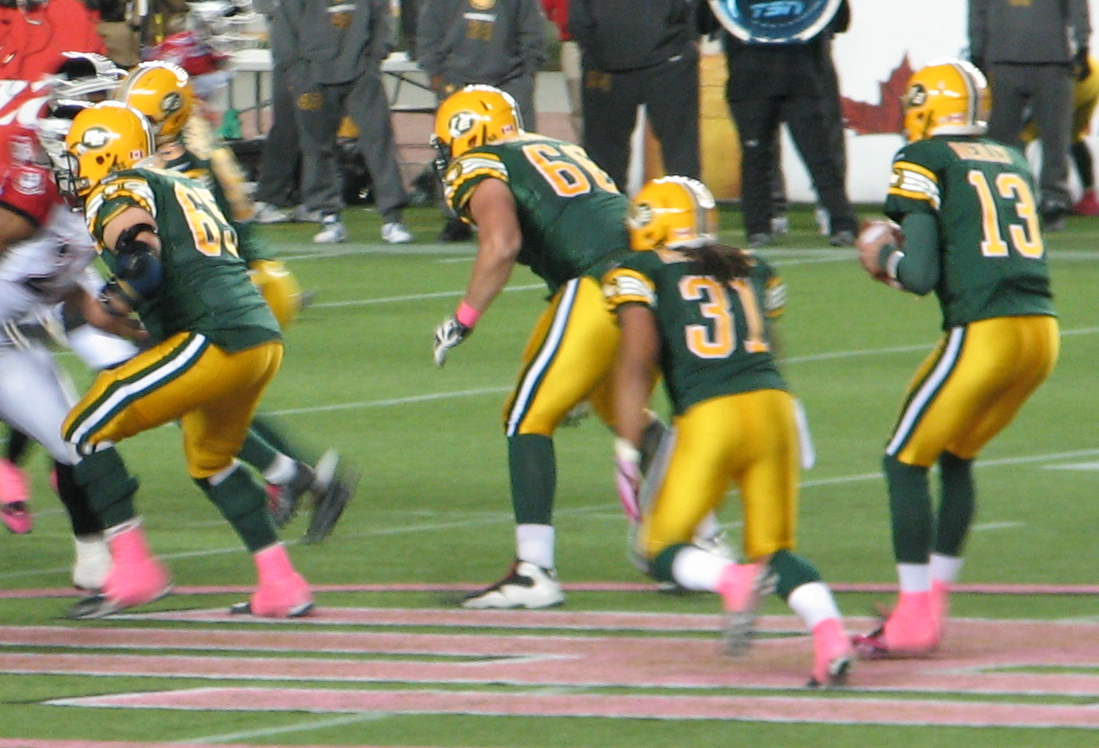
Calvin McCarty (#31) in a 2013 game against the Calgary Stampeders

McCarty played a role as a receiver and special teams player in 2013, but was almost entirely absent from the rushing game. He rushed for 48 yards on 9 carries, but caught 20 passes for 186 yards and two touchdowns. He continued to play on the special teams, and recorded nine special-teams tackles.

==== 2014 season ====
McCarty was shifted from playing mostly as a backup tailback to the fullback position, where he started all 18 regular season games. In his new position, McCarty was primarily used for blocking and remained involved on special teams and as a receiver. He continued his extremely limited role as a rusher, finishing the season with just eight carries. McCarty had 16 catches for 123 yards and two touchdowns, as well as a career-high 12 special-teams tackles.

==== 2015 season ====
McCarty was again used as a fullback and special teams player in 2015. After sustaining an unspecified injury in week 12, he missed several games and was placed on the six-game injured list. McCarty finished the season with only one carry and nine catches, his lowest total number of touches in any CFL season. With 12 starts, McCarty finished with one carry for 20 yards, nine receptions for 68 yards, as well as five special teams tackles and one kick return for 17 yards. McCarty played in the West Final and had one special teams tackle. He became a Grey Cup champion for the first time after rushing for three yards on a fake punt in the championship game versus the Redblacks.

=== Calgary Stampeders ===
On July 25, 2021, it was announced that McCarty had signed with the Calgary Stampeders. He became a free agent after the 2021 season. McCarty announced his retirement from football on March 14, 2021.

=== Season statistics ===
As of November 20, 2021		Rushing					Receiving					Defense	
Year	Team	Att	Yards	Avg	Long	TD	Catches	Yards	Avg	Long	TD	Tackles	STT
2007	EDM	6	13	2.2	11	0	7	99	14.1	44	1	1	5
2008	EDM	88	490	5.6	34	4	70	583	8.3	27	1	4	11
2009	EDM	67	348	5.2	37	5	20	124	6.2	17	2	1	7
2010	EDM	62	287	4.6	46	3	36	278	7.7	22	2	1	8
2011	EDM	52	209	4.0	53	0	22	150	6.8	22	1	1	9
2012	EDM	12	36	3.0	7	1	5	23	4.6	9	0	0	4
2013	EDM	9	48	5.3	23	0	20	186	9.3	23	2	3	9
2014	EDM	8	37	4.6	14	0	16	123	7.7	18	2	2	12
2015	EDM	1	20	20	20	0	9	68	7.6	26	0	0	6
2016	EDM	15	59	3.9	9	2	11	79	7.2	17	0	0	3
2017	EDM	13	56	4.3	9	0	23	143	6.2	14	1	0	3
2018	EDM	8	37	4.6	14	0	14	110	7.9	17	0	0	6
2019	EDM	3	8	2.7	6	2	10	39	3.9	7	0	0	2
2021	CGY	0	0	0.0	0	0	1	7	7.0	7	0	0	2
Total		337	1,615	4.8	53	18	264	2,012	7.6	44	12	13	87

== Coaching career ==
In April 2021, McCarty became the run game coordinator at Bellerose Composite High School.

In March 2024, he became the running backs coach for the Hamilton Tiger-Cats. He served in that capacity for one season.

== Personal life ==
McCarty grew up in Muskogee, Oklahoma with his mother, but when he was in grade six he was sent to Canada to live with his father in Surrey BC.

His mother was a college softball player for the NEO Lady Norse, while his father was a college basketball player for the Bacone Warriors and the Southeastern Oklahoma State Savage Storm. McCarty's siblings were also college athletes; Tiffany played softball for the McPherson Bulldogs while Jordan was a quarterback with the Reedley Tigers.
