= Abanikanda =

Abanikanda (Yoruba: Àbánikándá) is a Yoruba surname. Notable people with this surname include:

- Tumbo Abanikanda (born 1986), American Canadian football player
- Israel Abanikanda (born 2002), American football player
