= Mark Restelli =

American gridiron football player (born 1986)

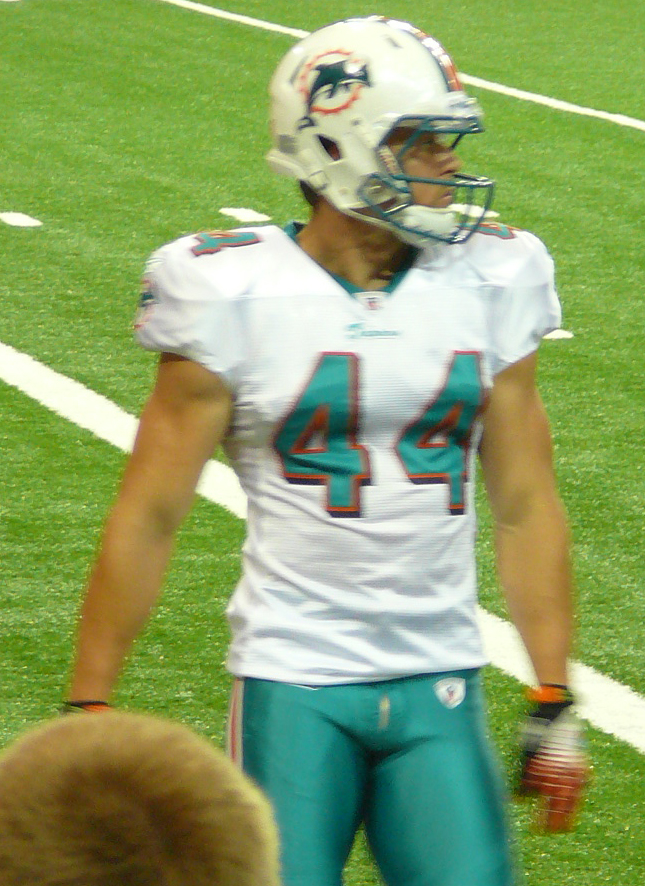
- Restelli with the Dolphins in 2011

Profile
- Position: Linebacker

Personal information
- Born: March 4, 1986 (age 40); Houston, Texas, U.S.
- Listed height: 6 ft 2 in (1.88 m)
- Listed weight: 215 lb (98 kg)

Career information
- High school: Santa Margarita Catholic (Rancho Santa Margarita, California)
- College: Cal Poly

Career history
- 2009–2010: Edmonton Eskimos
- 2011: Miami Dolphins*
- 2011: Edmonton Eskimos
- 2012: Montreal Alouettes*
- * Offseason or practice squad member only

Awards and highlights
- Honorable Mention All-Great West Conference
- Stats at Pro Football Reference

Mark Restelli (born March 4, 1986) is a former professional Canadian football linebacker. He most recently attended training camp with the Montreal Alouettes of the Canadian Football League (CFL). He was signed by the Edmonton Eskimos as a street free agent in 2009 and played until he was signed by the Miami Dolphins in 2011. Despite a strong preseason (which included 4 tackles and a defended pass in the fourth quarter of the final preseason game versus the Dallas Cowboys), on September 4, 2011, he was released by the Dolphins during their final roster cuts. On September 9, 2011, he announced that he would be resuming his football career in the Canadian Football League with the Edmonton Eskimos. He played college football for the Cal Poly Mustangs.

== College career ==
Restelli was a four-year starter at Cal Poly and never missed a game. He had 267 tackles, three sacks, three interceptions, two fumble recoveries and a forced fumble. Restelli ranks in the top ten lifetime in tackles at Cal Poly. In 2007, he was named Honorable Mention All-Great West. As a senior, he was named Defensive Team Captain. Restelli majored in agricultural business and viticulture.

== Professional career ==
=== Edmonton Eskimos ===
Restelli signed with the Edmonton Eskimos on April 29, 2009, after attending an Eskimos free-agent tryout camp in Long Beach, California. After the release of Derrick Doggett on June 10, Restelli's main competition for the starting weakside linebacker spot was fellow import rookie Tumbo Abanikanda. Restelli debuted for Edmonton on June 17 in a preseason game against the Saskatchewan Roughriders and recorded one tackle and an interception while Abanikanda recorded three tackles. Eskimos head coach Richie Hall has called Restelli and Abanikanda's battle the closest one in camp so far. Hall also stated that he hoped, "one player outperforms the other player" in Edmonton's next preseason game against the BC Lions on June 21." Eskimos general manager Danny Maciocia said that Restelli "plays as if his hair is on fire." In his three seasons with the Eskimos Restelli recorded 74 defensive tackles, 21 special teams tackles, and 4 sacks.

=== Miami Dolphins ===
In January 2011, Restelli signed a contract with the Miami Dolphins of the National Football League. He spent the training camp and preseason of the 2011 season playing on special teams. Despite a strong preseason performance (in the final preseason game versus the Dallas Cowboys, Restelli recorded four tackles and a defended pass), Restelli was released in the final round of cuts on September 3.

=== Return to the Edmonton Eskimos ===
Following his release by the Dolphins, Restelli returned to the Edmonton Eskimos of the Canadian Football League. He spent the remainder of the 2011 CFL season as a backup linebacker.

=== Montreal Alouettes ===
On February 15, 2012, Mark Restelli became a free agent after playing out his option year for the Edmonton Eskimos. On February 21, 2012, the Montreal Alouettes announced that they had signed Restelli. On June 16, 2012, he was released by the Alouettes along with eight other players. Restelli was injured for most of Montreal's training camp.

== Entrepreneur ==
Restelli retired from football in 2013 after a career-ending foot injury sustained during his time playing with the Dolphins. He underwent four surgeries over three years to get his foot back into functional shape. Medical marijuana played a critical role in his post-surgical recovery. Restelli continues to use medical marijuana and cannabidiol to treat a lifetime of sports injuries. He began his post-football career by starting a software company that serves this newly legal cannabis industry.

=== CannTrade ===
Established in 2016, CannTrade provides software tools that allow legal cannabis cultivators, manufacturers, distributors, and retailers to better manage their supply chain. CannTrade's parent company Trimpakt Inc was co-founded by Mark Restelli, Adam Holub, Brian Holub, and Drew Harmon. Restelli and CannTrade appeared on season 3 of The Marijuana Show.

== BlitzCraft ==
BlitzCraft is an American sports technology company focused on developing software tools for football coaches, leagues, players, referees, and sports organizations. The company specializes in digital coaching systems, game management platforms, statistical tracking, and sports-focused artificial intelligence tools.

BlitzCraft was co-founded by entrepreneur and football coach Mark Restelli, who serves in a leadership role focused on product vision, coaching systems, and platform development. The company's mission centers on modernizing football operations and making advanced coaching technology more accessible to youth and amateur sports programs.

BlitzCraft's primary product is FlagSnap.

== FlagSnap ==
FlagSnap is a football operations and coaching platform developed by BlitzCraft. The software is designed specifically for flag football organizations and combines play creation, team management, scorekeeping, statistical tracking, and film analysis into a single platform.

FlagSnap allows coaches to create animated football plays, organize digital playbooks, build game plans, and share content with teams. The platform also includes tools for live scoreboards, referee game management, tournament brackets, and player statistics.

One of FlagSnap's notable features is its experimental voice-to-stat technology, which allows users to verbally describe game actions while the software automatically logs statistics and play outcomes.

The platform also includes “The Film Room,” a developing video analysis system designed to connect game film with statistical data and scouting tools.

FlagSnap's slogan is:

“Everything in flag football starts with a snap.”

== Personal ==
Even though Restelli is from California, he claims that he does not surf. During the Edmonton Eskimos 2009 training camp, after being asked about it, Restelli responded: "You've got to be like the 10th person to ask it."

Restelli's first football job came on the Santa Margarita Catholic High School football sidelines as a 10-year-old waterboy alongside future New York Jets quarterback Mark Sanchez. Restelli and Sanchez played on the same Pop Warner team for three years. They shagged footballs on the Santa Margarita practice field for quarterback Carson Palmer, who went on to win the 2002 Heisman Trophy and become the top overall selection in the 2003 NFL draft.
