= Osborne High School (Georgia) =

Public high school in Marietta, Georgia, United States

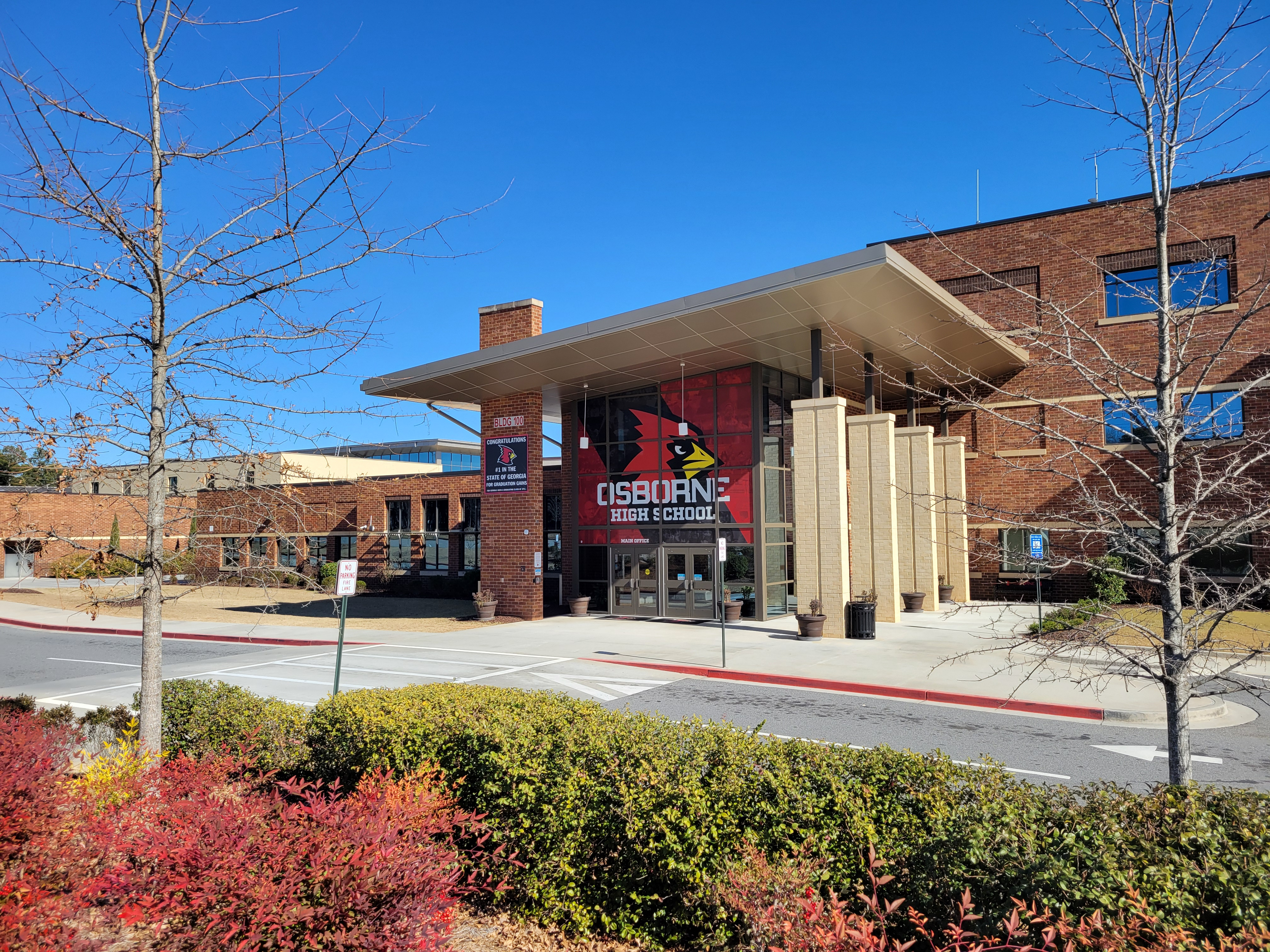

Location
- 2451 Favor Road Southwest; Marietta, Georgia address 30060; United States; 33°53′31″N 84°33′58″W

Information
- Type: Public school
- Established: 1892; 134 years ago
- School district: Cobb County School District
- Principal: Troy Jones
- Grades: 9–12
- Enrollment: 2,790 (2024-25)
- Student to teacher ratio: 16.84 (2024-25)
- Colors: Red and white
- Mascot: Cardinal
- Rival: Campbell High School
- Website: www.cobbk12.org/Osborne/
- National Center for Education Statistics

Robert L. Osborne High School is a public high school located in unincorporated Cobb County, Georgia, United States, north of Atlanta and with a Marietta postal address. It is the oldest high school in Cobb County. For the 2024–2025 school year, 2,790 students were enrolled. The school mascot is the cardinal, and the school colors are red and white.

== History ==
Established as Olive Springs Consolidated School in 1884, the building consisted of a single room serving grades one through eight. In 1892 the school became part of the Cobb County School System and was housed in the Olive Springs Baptist Church, little is known about the history of the community school until 1919.

As a member of a faculty of only three, Robert L. Osborne became the principal of Olive Springs Community School in 1919. Over the next nine years, Osborne worked tirelessly to serve a growing population. In 1928, the school moved from its original location at Olive Springs Baptist Church to Joyner Avenue. As the new school opened on September 10, 1928, it employed ten teachers and served 350 students in grades one through nine. In 1936, recognizing and honoring Osborne's commitment to the community, Olive Springs School was renamed Robert L. Osborne School.

In 1938, R. L. Osborne became a fully accredited senior high school. Its first graduating class in 1939 boasted 25 members, 13 boys and 12 girls. As the school moved to its present location on Favor Road in 1962, Mr. Osborne retired.

In 2018, to prepare for the incoming Cobb Innovative Technical Academy, the old school building was demolished. For two years, students learned out of either mobile classrooms and the remaining buildings.

In 2020, after two years of construction, the newly rebuilt Osborne High School was opened alongside the Cobb Innovative Technical Academy. This building houses Cobb County's 6th and newest magnet school.

== Demographics ==
The demographic breakdown of the 2,790 students enrolled for 2024-2025 was:

- Male - 53.3%
- Female - 46.6%
- Native American/Alaskan - 0.1%
- Asian - 1.2%
- Black - 25.6%
- Hispanic - 66.5%
- Native Hawaiian/Pacific Islanders - 0.1%
- White - 4.2%
- Multiracial - 2.1%

== Athletics ==
The following sports are offered:

- Football
- Baseball
- Boys' tennis
- Girls' tennis
- Boys' track
- Girls' track
- Cross country
- Volleyball
- Wrestling
- Boys' basketball
- Girls' basketball
- Fastpitch softball
- Boys' soccer
- Girls' soccer
- eSports

== Notable alumni ==
- Tokumbo Abanikanda, former Southern Miss linebacker and current scout for the Atlanta Falcons
- K Camp, rapper, real name Kristopher Campbell
- Jason Jones, former professional baseball player (Texas Rangers)
- Todd Jones, former professional baseball player (Houston Astros, Detroit Tigers, Minnesota Twins, Colorado Rockies, Boston Red Sox, Cincinnati Reds, Philadelphia Phillies, Florida Marlins)
