= Richie Hall =

American gridiron football player and coach (born 1960)

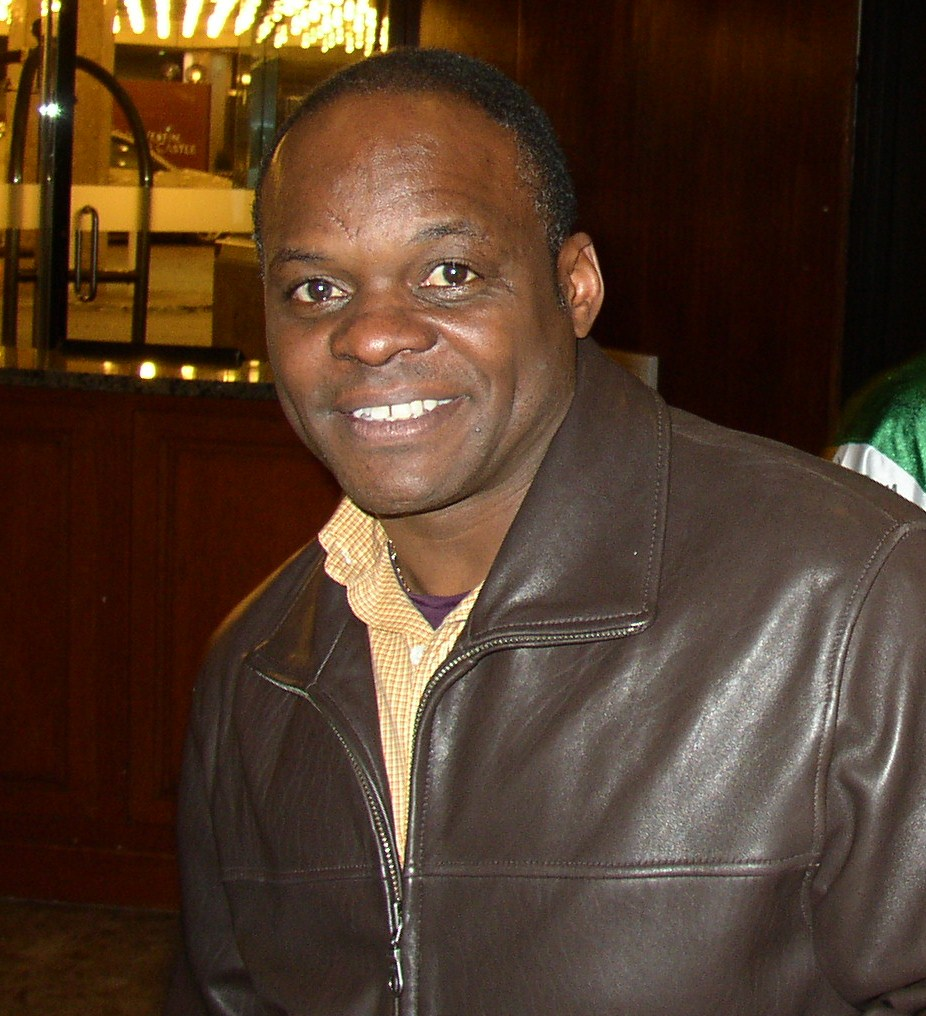
- Hall in 2007

Winnipeg Blue Bombers
- Title: Defensive coach

Personal information
- Born: October 4, 1960 (age 66); San Antonio, Texas, U.S.
- Listed height: 5 ft 6 in (1.68 m)
- Listed weight: 160 lb (73 kg)

Career information
- Position: Defensive back (No. 7)
- College: Colorado State

Career history

Playing
- 1983–1987: Calgary Stampeders
- 1988–1991: Saskatchewan Roughriders

Coaching
- 1994–2000: Saskatchewan Roughriders (Defensive secondary)
- 2001–2008: Saskatchewan Roughriders (Defensive coordinator)
- 2009–2010: Edmonton Eskimos (Head coach)
- 2010: Edmonton Eskimos (Defensive coordinator)
- 2011–2014: Saskatchewan Roughriders (Defensive coordinator)
- 2015–2023: Winnipeg Blue Bombers (Defensive coordinator)
- 2024–present: Winnipeg Blue Bombers (Defensive coach)

Awards and highlights
- As player: Grey Cup champion (1989); CFL All-Star (1983); 4× CFL West All-Star (1983, 1986, 1988, 1990); Tom Pate Memorial Award (1990); As coach: 4× Grey Cup champion (2007, 2013, 2019, 2021)

Richie Hall (born October 4, 1960) is a defensive assistant coach for the Winnipeg Blue Bombers of the Canadian Football League (CFL). He played professionally as a Canadian football defensive back for nine seasons for the Calgary Stampeders and Saskatchewan Roughriders where he was a CFL All-Star in 1983 and a four-time divisional All-Star. He is a five-time Grey Cup champion, once as a player and four times as a defensive coordinator. He was formerly the head coach of the Edmonton Eskimos from 2009 to 2010.

== Early life ==
Hall was born October 4, 1960, in San Antonio, Texas. He was in a car accident as a child that catapulted him through the windshield of the car and nearly killed him, leaving him with permanent scars above his right eye.

He was a star two-way American football player in high school despite his height of just 5 feet 6 inches (1.68 m).

== College career ==
Hall was a walk on college football player at Colorado State University, where he majored in social work. He played for the Rams from 1980 to 1982.

== Professional career ==
=== Calgary Stampeders ===
Hall originally signed with the Calgary Stampeders in May 1983 and, in his rookie season, was a CFL All-Star defensive back, playing in 16 games recording four interceptions and two fumble recoveries. He also returned 50 punts on special teams for 561 yards including one touchdown and one kickoff return for 12 yards. He earned West Division All-Star honours in the 1986 CFL season for his defensive work recording four sacks, eight interceptions for 116 yards, and one fumble recovery for 50 yards. He also returned 16 punts that year for 260 yards.

=== Saskatchewan Roughriders ===
Hall was traded to the Saskatchewan Roughriders in May 1988 for a fourth-round pick in the 1989 CFL draft and returned as a 1988 CFL season and 1990 CFL season West Division All-Star. He won his first Grey Cup championship in 1989.

In all, he appeared in 153 career regular-season games between 1983 and 1991 playing both defensive back and punt returner, was a four-time West Division all-star, a League All-Star in 1983, and was selected for the Tom Pate Memorial Award in 1990.

After being released by the Roughriders, Hall used his social work degree and got a job at Regina's Cornwall Alternative School for high-risk kids and joined Regina's Archbishop M.C. O'Neill High School football coaching staff in 1993 before embarking on his professional coaching career.

== Coaching career ==
=== Saskatchewan Roughriders ===
In 1994, Hall was hired by the Saskatchewan Roughriders to coach their defensive backfield and worked his way up to defensive coordinator by 2000. He gained a reputation as one of the top minds for defensive schemes in the CFL and served as Saskatchewan's defensive coordinator for eight years including the 95th Grey Cup victory for Saskatchewan in 2007. His 2008 Saskatchewan Roughriders defence finished the season with the best in fewest yards allowed (354 per game), second in pass defence (266 yards per game) and fewest passing TDs allowed (28) and third in fewest TDs (44) and points allowed (25.1 per game).

=== Edmonton Eskimos ===
Hall interviewed for at least seven head coaching positions beginning after the 2004 CFL season and, on December 17, 2008, Hall was hired as the head coach for the Edmonton Eskimos, the first black head coach in the Edmonton Eskimos history. When looking for a new coach, Eskimos General Manager Danny Maciocia said he asked his quarterbacks to name the toughest defensive co-ordinator they've played against and was given the unanimous response of Richie Hall.

Hall has said that he wants his players to enjoy the game, work hard, appreciate everything, and take nothing for granted. "I want our players to have a selfless attitude. I want them to be there for each other," Hall said. "I like to think football is a way for them to live their lives."

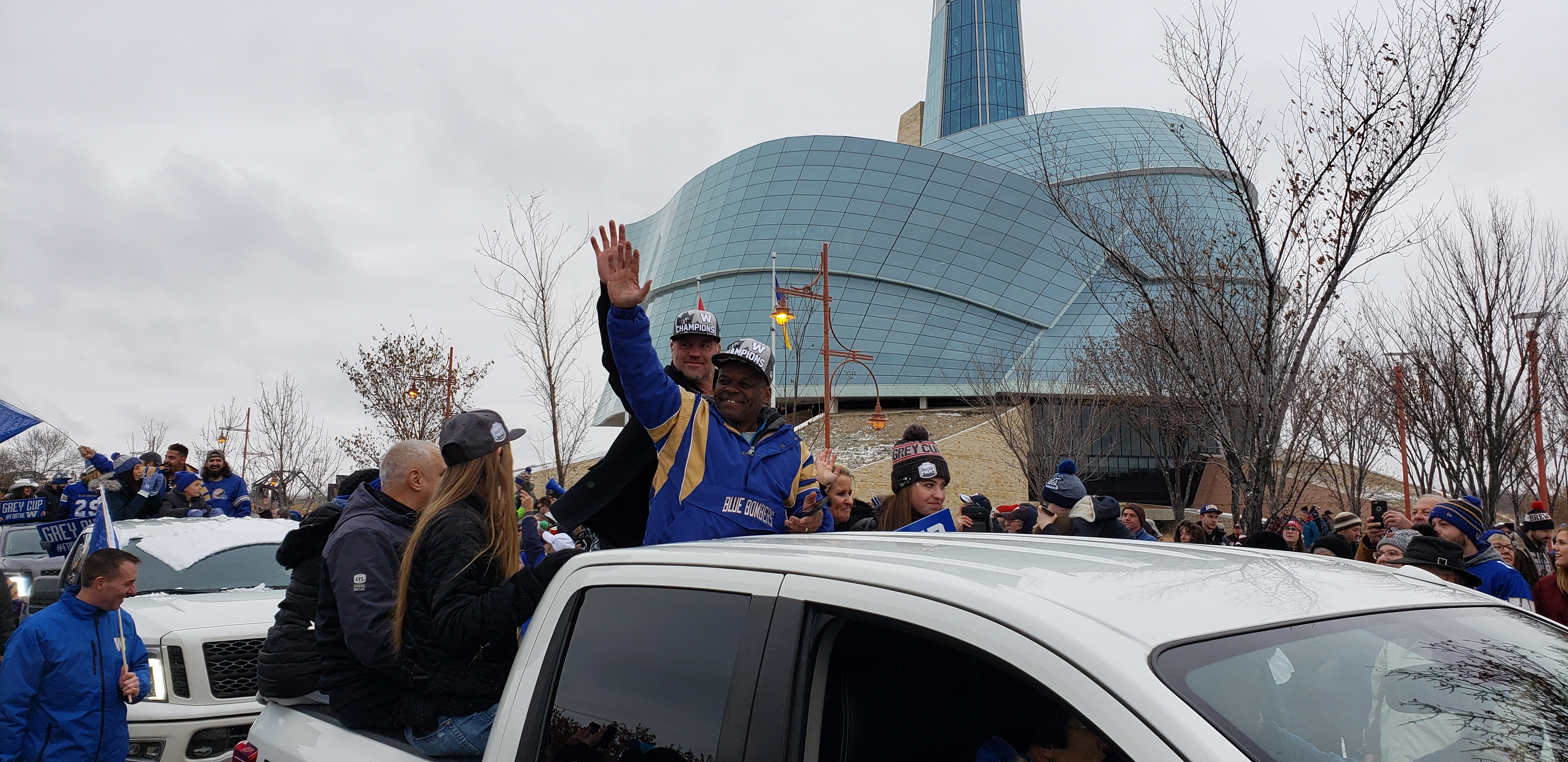
Richie Hall at the Winnipeg Blue Bombers 2019 Grey Cup parade.

During his first training camp as head coach, arguably the most competitive battle was between Tumbo Abanikanda and Mark Restelli for the starting weakside linebacker spot. Hall stated that he hoped the battle would end when,"one player outperforms the other player". Eventually, Abanikanda was released with Restelli winning the job.

On November 12, 2010, Hall was fired as the Eskimos head coach after two seasons coaching the team.

=== Saskatchewan Roughriders (II) ===
On February 1, 2011, it was announced that Hall had rejoined the Roughriders as their defensive coordinator. He won his third Grey Cup following the team's victory in the 101st Grey Cup in 2013.

=== Winnipeg Blue Bombers ===
Hall was hired as the defensive coordinator for the Winnipeg Blue Bombers on January 20, 2015. After missing the playoffs in 2015, the Blue Bombers made the playoffs for each season that Hall served as defensive coordinator, and played in four consecutive Grey Cups, including two championship victories in 2019 and 2021. On January 8, 2024, it was announced that Jordan Younger had been promoted to defensive coordinator, but that Hall would remain on the defensive coaching staff.

== CFL coaching record ==
Team	Year	Regular season					Postseason		
Team	Year	Won	Lost	Ties	Win %	Finish	Won	Lost	Result
EDM	2009	9	9	0	.500	3rd in West Division	0	1	Lost West Semi-Final
EDM	2010	7	11	0	.388	4th in West Division	–	–	Missed playoffs
Total		16	20	0	.444	0 West Division; Championships	0	1	0 Grey Cups
