= Tumbo Abanikanda =

American gridiron football player (born 1986)

Profile
- Position: Linebacker

Personal information
- Born: December 25, 1986 (age 39); Atlanta, Georgia, U.S.
- Listed height: 5 ft 11 in (1.80 m)
- Listed weight: 225 lb (102 kg)

Career information
- High school: Marietta (GA) Osborne
- College: Southern Miss
- NFL draft: 2009: undrafted

Career history
- 2009: Edmonton Eskimos*
- * Offseason or practice squad member only
- Stats at CFL.ca (archive)

Tokumbo "Tumbo" Abanikanda (pronounced: A-banna-conda) (born December 25, 1986) is an American former football linebacker. He was signed by the Edmonton Eskimos as a street free agent in 2009. He played college football for the Southern Miss Golden Eagles.

== Early life ==
Abanikanda attended Osborne High School in Marietta, Georgia. Coming out of high school, he was two star recruit. According to Rivals.com, Abanikanda ran a 4.62 forty yard dash, benched 330 pounds, with 20 repetitions. Abanikanda was headed to Illinois until a final push from Southern Miss changed his mind.

== College career ==
In 2008, as a senior at the University of Southern Mississippi, Abanikanda recorded 94 tackles, 11 tackles for a loss, three forced fumbles, two sacks, a pass broken up and one interception.

== Professional career ==
After going undrafted in the 2009 NFL draft, Abanikanda was invited to the Tampa Bay Buccaneers rookie camp, but was not signed.

Following his backup plan, Abanikanda signed with the Edmonton Eskimos on May 26, 2009. After the release of Derrick Doggett on June 10, Abanikanda's main competition for the starting weakside linebacker spot is fellow import rookie Mark Restelli also in his first year with Edmonton. Abanikanda debuted for Edmonton on June 17 in a preseason game against the Saskatchewan Roughriders and recorded three tackles while Restelli had one tackle and an interception. Eskimos head coach Richie Hall has called Abanikanda and Restelli's battle the closest one in camp so far. Hall also stated that he hoped, "one player outperforms the other player" in Edmonton's next preseason game against the BC Lions on June 21." During training camp, his head coach called him "T. A." because he couldn't pronounce his name. Eventually, he was released on June 25, 2009, as a final cut with Restelli winning the job, however he could end up on the Eskimos' practice roster. He was re-signed to the practice roster on June 29, 2009, only to be released again on July 12.

== Scouting career ==
Abanikanda has spent time as a scout for the Atlanta Falcons of the National Football League.
