= 2001 Big League World Series =

Tournament details
- Country: United States
- City: Easley, South Carolina
- Dates: 4–11 August 2001
- Teams: 9

Final positions
- Champions: Westminster, California
- Runners-up: Valencia, Venezuela

The 2001 Big League World Series youth baseball tournament took place from August 4–11, 2001 in Easley, South Carolina, U.S. Westminster, California, U.S., defeated Valencia, Venezuela, in the championship game.

This was the first BLWS held in Easley.

== Teams ==
United States	International
(South Carolina) Easley, South Carolina; District 1 Host	Surrey, Canada; District 3 Canada
(Indiana) Jefferson, Indiana; District 5 Central	(Ukraine) Kyiv, Ukraine; Khymelnytskiy; Europe
(Pennsylvania) Williamsport, Pennsylvania; District 12; East	(Northern Mariana Islands) Saipan, Northern Mariana Islands; CNMI; Far East
(Florida) Dunedin, Florida; District 12; South	(Venezuela) Valencia, Venezuela; Flor Amarillo; Latin America
(California) Westminster, California; District 62; West	

== Results ==
United States Pool

Team	W	L	Rs	Ra
California	3	1	21	13
South Carolina	3	1	29	17
Florida	3	1	27	18
Pennsylvania	1	3	18	24
Indiana	0	4	8	29

	(California)	(Florida)	(Indiana)	(Pennsylvania)	(South Carolina)
California	–	1–2	7–6	7–1	6–4
Florida	2–1	–	9–2	8–4	8–11
Indiana	1–7	2–9	–	4–6	1–7
Pennsylvania	6–7	4–8	6–4	–	2–5
South Carolina	4–6	11–8	7–1	5–2	–

International Pool

Team	W	L	Rs	Ra
Venezuela	3	0	21	1
Canada	2	1	12	15
Ukraine	1	2	13	23
Northern Mariana Islands	0	3	7	14

	(Canada)	(Northern Mariana Islands)	(Ukraine)	(Venezuela)
Canada	–	3–2	8–7	1–6
Northern Mariana Islands	2–3	–	5–6	0–5
Ukraine	7–8	6–5	–	0–10
Venezuela	6–1	5–0	10–0	–

Consolation round

—
0–4	Indiana	7
0–3	Northern Mariana Islands	5

—
1–3	Pennsylvania	3
1–2	Ukraine	1

Elimination Round

Semifinals
3–1	California	2
3–1	South Carolina	1
3–0	Venezuela	2
2–1	Canada	1

World championship
4–1	California	5
4–0	Venezuela	4
Third-place game
3–2	South Carolina	1
2–2	Canada	7

2001 Big League World Series Champions
California District 62
Westminster, California
