= The Marijuana Show =

Reality television series

- Genre: Reality
- Presented by: Wendy Robbins; Karen Paull
- Country of origin: United States
- Original language: English
- No. of seasons: 3

Production
- Running time: 30 minutes

Original release
- Network: Hulu
- Release: November 19, 2014

The Marijuana Show is an online series focused on businesses in the legal cannabis industry. The show's logo depicts George Washington with a joint.
