= Jason Barnes =

American gridiron football player (born 1984)

Profile
- Position: Wide receiver

Personal information
- Born: April 11, 1984 (age 42); San Jose, California, U.S.
- Listed height: 6 ft 3 in (1.91 m)
- Listed weight: 185 lb (84 kg)

Career information
- High school: Del Campo (Fair Oaks, California)
- College: Sacramento State
- NFL draft: 2008: undrafted

Career history
- 2007–2008: Central Valley Coyotes
- 2009–2011: Edmonton Eskimos
- 2012–2014: Toronto Argonauts

Awards and highlights
- Grey Cup champion (2012)
- Stats at CFL.ca (archive)

Jason Barnes (born April 11, 1984) is an American former professional football player who was a wide receiver in the Canadian Football League (CFL). He was originally signed by the Central Valley Coyotes as a free agent in 2007. He then played for three seasons with the Edmonton Eskimos, followed by another three seasons with the Toronto Argonauts. He played college football for the Sacramento State Hornets.

== Personal life ==
His older brother, Matt Barnes, is a former NBA player. On November 27, 2007, his mother Anne died from stage 4 lung cancer.
