= Samuel Fournier =

Canadian football player (born 1986)

Profile
- Position: Fullback

Personal information
- Born: January 28, 1986 (age 40); Mont-Tremblant, Quebec, Canada
- Listed height: 6 ft 0 in (1.83 m)
- Listed weight: 238 lb (108 kg)

Career information
- University: Laval
- CFL draft: 2010: 3rd round, 19th overall pick

Career history
- 2010: Hamilton Tiger-Cats*
- 2010–2011: Edmonton Eskimos
- 2012: Hamilton Tiger-Cats
- 2014–2015: Montreal Alouettes
- * Offseason or practice squad member only

Awards and highlights
- Team Canada Junior MVP Houston 2004; Team Canada Junior MVP Detroit 2006; Laval University Rookie of the year in 2006; 2004 Houston World Junior Championship All-Star Team Running Back; 2006 Detroit World Junior Championship All-Star Team Running Back; All Time Rushing Record in Collegial AA in 2004. 1534 rushing yards in 261 carries in 8 games
- Stats at CFL.ca (archive)

Samuel Fournier (born January 28, 1986) is a Canadian former professional football fullback who played in the Canadian Football League (CFL). He drafted 19th overall by the Hamilton Tiger-Cats in the 2010 CFL draft. Fournier was also a member of the Edmonton Eskimos and Montreal Alouettes. He played college football for the Laval Rouge et Or.

Samuel Fournier signed with the Tiger- Cats as a free agent on June 2, 2012. He spent the entire 2011 season on the Eskimos injured list. In 2010 Samuel was selected by the Tiger-Cats in the third round (19th overall) of the CFL Canadian Draft. He joined the Laval Rouge et Or in 2006 and was named Rookie of the Year and won the Vanier Cup in both 2006 and 2008. He played in the East-West Bowl in 2009. Over four seasons, Fournier played in 45 of the team's 46 games. He carried the ball 97 times for 621 yards and eight touchdowns and also had 14 receptions for 141 yards. He started his football career in Saint-Jean-sur-Richelieu, Québec, joining the Les Géants du Cégep St-Jean where he broke the all-time rushing record with 1534 yards in eight games in 2004. He was his team MVP and league MVP in 2004–2005. During those same years, he played with Team Canada Junior to represent his country at the NFL Global Junior Championships. He won the World Title twice in 2005 and 2006 and was twice named Team Canada MVP in 2004 and 2006.
