= Derrick Doggett =

American gridiron football player (born 1984)

Profile
- Position: Linebacker

Personal information
- Born: December 31, 1984 (age 41); San Diego, California, U.S.
- Listed height: 6 ft 3 in (1.91 m)
- Listed weight: 210 lb (95 kg)

Career information
- College: Oregon State
- NFL draft: 2008: undrafted

Career history
- Edmonton Eskimos (2008); Winnipeg Blue Bombers (2009); Pittsburgh Steelers (2010)*; Carolina Panthers (2010)*
- * Offseason or practice squad member only

Awards and highlights
- 3× Second-team All-Pac-10 (2005–2007); Emerald Bowl Defensive MVP (2007)

Career CFL statistics
- Tackles: 33
- Forced fumbles: 1
- Interceptions: 1
- Stats at CFL.ca (archived)

Derrick Doggett (born December 31, 1984) is an American former professional football linebacker. He was signed by the Edmonton Eskimos as a street free agent in 2008. He played college football at Oregon State, after graduating from University City High School.

Doggett was also a member of the Winnipeg Blue Bombers, Pittsburgh Steelers, and Carolina Panthers.
