= Arkee Whitlock =

American gridiron football player (born 1984)

No. 24, 36
- Position: Running back

Personal information
- Born: May 10, 1984 (age 42); Rock Hill, South Carolina, U.S.
- Listed height: 5 ft 9 in (1.75 m)
- Listed weight: 203 lb (92 kg)

Career information
- High school: Rock Hill (Rock Hill, South Carolina)
- College: Southern Illinois

Career history
- 2007: Minnesota Vikings*
- 2007: San Francisco 49ers*
- 2007–2008: Minnesota Vikings*
- 2009–2011: Edmonton Eskimos
- * Offseason or practice squad member only

Awards and highlights
- 3× All-Gateway Conference (2004–2006); I-AA All-American (2006); Walter Payton Award finalist (2006); Eskimos' Most Outstanding Rookie (2009)

Arkee Whitlock (born May 10, 1984) is an American former professional football running back who played for the Edmonton Eskimos of the Canadian Football League. He was signed by the Minnesota Vikings as an undrafted free agent in 2007. He played college football with the Southern Illinois Salukis, where he finished the 2007 season third in voting for the Walter Payton Award.

Whitlock was also a member of the San Francisco 49ers.

== Professional career ==
He was signed as an undrafted free agent following the 2007 NFL draft by the Minnesota Vikings, and was subsequently cut during training camp. Whitlock briefly signed with the San Francisco 49ers, and was able to see playing time during the preseason. After he was waived by the 49ers, he again signed with the Vikings, where he was allocated to their practice squad.

Whitlock was signed by the Edmonton Eskimos on April 23, 2009. He was released on July 31, 2011.
