= Daniel Porter (Canadian football) =

American football player (born 1987)

No. 32, 23
- Position: Running back

Personal information
- Born: July 31, 1987 (age 39); Baton Rouge, Louisiana, U.S.
- Listed height: 5 ft 9 in (1.75 m)
- Listed weight: 197 lb (89 kg)

Career information
- High school: Istrouma (Baton Rouge)
- College: Louisiana Tech (2006–2009)
- NFL draft: 2010: undrafted

Career history
- Carolina Panthers (2010)*; Edmonton Eskimos (2010–2011); Hamilton Tiger-Cats (2011)
- * Offseason or practice squad member only

Daniel Porter (born July 31, 1987) is an American former professional football running back who played in the Canadian Football League (CFL) with the Edmonton Eskimos and Hamilton Tiger-Cats. He played college football at Louisiana Tech.

== Early life ==
Daniel Porter was born on July 31, 1987, in Baton Rouge, Louisiana. He attended Istrouma High School in Baton Rouge.

== College career ==
Porter was a four-year letterman for the Louisiana Tech Bulldogs from 2006 to 2009. He rushed for career totals of 3,352 yards and 28 touchdowns, including over 1,000 yards in both his junior and senior seasons. He also caught 53 passes for 433 yards and two touchdowns.

== Professional career ==
After going undrafted in the 2010 NFL draft, Porter signed with the Carolina Panthers on April 30, 2010. He was released on June 17, 2010.

Porter signed with the Edmonton Eskimos of the Canadian Football League (CFL) on September 15, 2010. He had been doing odd jobs prior to signing with the Eskimos. He rushed for 603 yards and two touchdowns in only six games (four starts) during the 2010 season. Porter only dressed in five games (no starts) in 2011, rushing for 89 yards and two touchdowns, before being released on September 12, 2011.

Porter was signed to the practice roster of the CFL's Hamilton Tiger-Cats on October 26, 2011. He was later promoted to the active roster and played in one game for Hamilton during the 2011 season, recording eight carries for 24 yards, two receptions for 23 yards, and four kickoff returns for 89 yards.
