= Mannix (disambiguation) =

Mannix is an American television show that aired between 1967 and 1975.

Mannix may also refer to:

== Surname ==
- Adrian Mannix (born 1988), Irish hurler
- Alan Mannix (born 1947), Australian rules footballer
- Brian Mannix (born 1961), Australian rock singer and actor
- Daniel Mannix (1864–1963), longtime Catholic Archbishop of Melbourne
- Daniel P. Mannix (1911–1997), author and journalist
- David Mannix (born 1985), English retired footballer
- Eddie Mannix (1891–1963), American film studio executive and "fixer"
- Edward Mannix (1928–1995), American voice actor, author and journalist
- Elizabeth A. Mannix, Cornell University management professor
- Emily Mannix (born 1994), Australian netball player
- Fred Mannix (born 1942), Canadian billionaire businessman
- Fred Mannix Jr. (born 1983/84), Canadian polo player, son of Fred Mannix
- Frederick S. Mannix (1881–1951), Canadian entrepreneur, grandfather of Fred Mannix
- Gareth Mannix (born 1977), Irish record producer
- Sir Henry Mannix, 1st Baronet (1740–1822), Anglo-Irish magistrate
- Jack Mannix (1920–1994), Australian politician
- Kevin Mannix (born 1949), American politician
- Richard E. Mannix (1928–2011), American politician
- Simon Mannix (born 1971), New Zealand rugby union football coach and former player
- Tom Mannix (born 1963), Irish Gaelic footballer
- Toni Mannix (1906–1983), American actress, dancer and wife of Eddie Mannix
- William Francis Mannix (died 1920), author and forger.

== Given name ==
- Mannix Dalipe (born 1973), Filipino politician
- Mannix Flynn (born 1957), Irish author and artist
- Mannix Joyce (1924–2006), Irish local historian and writer
- Mannix Román (born 1983), Puerto Rican volleyball player

== Other uses ==
- Mannix (album), the 1969 soundtrack for the television show
- Mannix College (Monash University), an Australian residential college named after Daniel Mannix
- Mannix Contractors, former name of Loram Maintenance of Way
