= Frederick Mannix =

Frederick Mannix may refer to:

- Frederick S. Mannix (1881–1951), Canadian businessman and the founder of the Mannix family
- Fred Mannix (Frederick Philip Mannix, born 1942), Canadian billionaire businessman
- Fred Mannix Jr. (born 1984), Canadian polo player
