= Clair Warner =

Canadian football player and executive

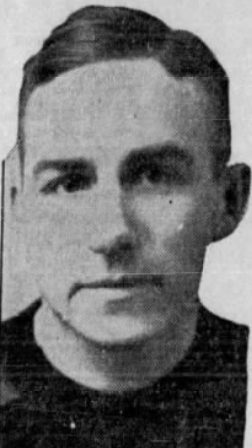
- Warner in the early 1930s

Profile
- Position: End

Personal information
- Born: March 30, 1903; Pierre, South Dakota, U.S.
- Died: November 18, 1970 (aged 67); Regina, Saskatchewan, Canada

Career history

Playing
- 1924–1928 1931–1932: Saskatchewan Roughriders

executive
- 1934–1970: Saskatchewan Roughriders

Awards and highlights
- Regina Sportsman of the Year (1966)
- Canadian Football Hall of Fame (Class of 1965)

Clair Joseph Warner (March 30, 1903 – November 18, 1970) was an American-born Canadian football player and executive. He played seven seasons with the Saskatchewan Roughriders, before starting an executive career that spanned 37 seasons until his death in 1970. He was a 1965 inductee to the Canadian Football Hall of Fame.

== Early life ==
Warner was born on March 30, 1903, in Pierre, South Dakota. His family moved to Canada in 1917, when Warner was 14. He moved to Regina, Saskatchewan, two years later, and played juvenile football that year.

== Playing career ==
From 1920 to 1924, Warner played junior football in Regina, before joining the Saskatchewan Roughriders in late 1924. He played the end position, and spent 1924 to 1928, then again from 1931 to 1932 with the team, before retiring in 1933. He appeared in four Grey Cup games with Saskatchewan, but did not win any.

== Executive career ==
After retiring, Warner accepted a position as a Western Interprovincial Football Union (WIFU) executive. He re-joined the Roughriders one year later as general manager, while keeping the other position. In 1941, Warner became the president of the Roughrider organization. He gave his general manager position to Greg Grassick, a former teammate of his, in 1950, but regained the role in 1951. From 1961 until his death in 1970, he served on the Roughrider management committee.

Warner also served for five years on the rules committee of the Canadian Rugby Union, and was WIFU president in 1948.

In 1956, he was awarded the Canadian Rugby Union Plaque for his "outstanding contributions to football." In 1965, he was inducted into the Canadian Football Hall of Fame. In 1966, Warner was the first recipient of the Regina Sportsman of the Year award.

== Personal life and death ==
From 1920 to 1921, Warner worked for the Union Bank, and afterwards was employed at Robert Simpson Western Ltd. In 1926, he joined Northwestern Electric Company, where he was employed until his retirement in 1962.

During World War II, Warner served in the reserve army with the Regina Rifle Regiment.

Warner was also active in several different organizations, with the Canadian Club, Regina Chamber of Commerce, Electric Service League, and Cathedral Men's Club of Holy Rosary Church. He also spent time with the Wascana Golf and Country Club, Assiniboia Club, the Saskatchewan chapter of the Telephone Pioneers of America, the Wascana Winter Club, and was in the Regina United Appeal.

With his wife, Nellie, Warner had one child. He died on November 18, 1970, at the age of 67, in Regina.
