= Henry Dorsch =

Canadian football player (1940–2016)

Hank Dorsch
Profile
- Position: Fullback

Personal information
- Born: November 27, 1940; Glaslyn, Saskatchewan, Canada
- Died: December 10, 2016 (aged 76); Regina, Saskatchewan, Canada
- Listed height: 5 ft 11 in (1.80 m)
- Listed weight: 190 lb (86 kg)

Career history
- 1964–1971: Saskatchewan Roughriders

Awards and highlights
- Grey Cup champion (1966)

Henry Carl Dorsch (November 27, 1940 – December 10, 2016) was a Canadian professional football player who played for the Saskatchewan Roughriders of the Canadian Football League (CFL). He won the Grey Cup with Saskatchewan in 1966. Born in Weyburn, Saskatchewan, he previously played for the University of Tulsa. He died in 2016 at the age of 76.
