= Robert A. Kramer =

Robert Alphonso Kramer (July 31, 1906 – June 28, 1991) was an American-born Canadian football executive who was president of the Saskatchewan Roughriders from 1951 to 1953 and 1961 to 1965.

== Early life ==
Kramer was born in Petaluma, California on July 31, 1906 to Albert Edward and Catherine Henrietta (Hughes) Kramer. The family moved to Canada in 1917 and settled on a farm near Lethbridge. Kramer became a naturalized Canadian citizen in 1922. Kramer graduated from St. Mary's High School in Calgary. On August 9, 1925, he married Alice Mannix, daughter of Frederick S. Mannix. They had five children.

== Business ==
Kramer's first job was teaching. He then spent 18 years with Mannix Co., a Calgary construction firm, where he rose from apprentice to construction supervisor to partner. In 1944, the company was sold to an American group.

On June 1, 1944, Kramer became a dealer for Caterpillar Inc. in Regina, Saskatchewan. He formed Kramer-Church Tractor Co. with his brother, Thomas, and Clarence Church. Church died three years later and the company was renamed the Kramer Tractor Company. By 1964, the company had 200 employees and $7.5 million in sales. Kramer retired in 1980 and was succeeded as president by his son, Donald.

== Saskatchewan Roughriders ==
Kramer became president of the Saskatchewan Roughriders in 1951. During his first season, he made a recruiting trip to New York City, where he signed a number of players, including future Canadian Football Hall of Famer Martin Ruby. The Roughriders lost that year's Grey Cup to the Ottawa Rough Riders. In 1960, Kramer was president of Western Interprovincial Football Union. He returned to the Roughriders presidency in 1961 and along with general manager Ken Preston, hired a new coaching staff, led by Steve Owen, and signed future Hall of Famers Ron Lancaster and George Reed. The Roughriders made 15 consecutive playoff appearances and won their first Grey Cup in 1966. Kramer was inducted into the Canadian Football Hall of Fame in 1987.
