= Mike Cassidy (Canadian football) =

American football player (1926–2011)

Profile
- Positions: Tackle, Guard

Personal information
- Born: April 21, 1926; Ohio, United States
- Died: March 30, 2011 (aged 84); Florida, United States
- Listed height: 6 ft 3 in (1.91 m)
- Listed weight: 210 lb (95 kg)

Career information
- College: Alabama

Career history
- 1948–1955: Saskatchewan Roughriders

Awards and highlights
- 5× CFL West All-Star (1948, 1949, 1950, 1953, 1954)

Francis Quinn "Mike" Cassidy (April 21, 1926 – March 30, 2011) was an American professional football player for the Saskatchewan Roughriders of the Western Interprovincial Football Union. A native of Bellaire, Ohio, Cassidy played college football for the Alabama Crimson Tide. In 1994, he was included on the Roughriders' Plaza of Honour. He lived in Neffs, Ohio.
