= Jim Hopson =

Canadian football player (1951–2024)

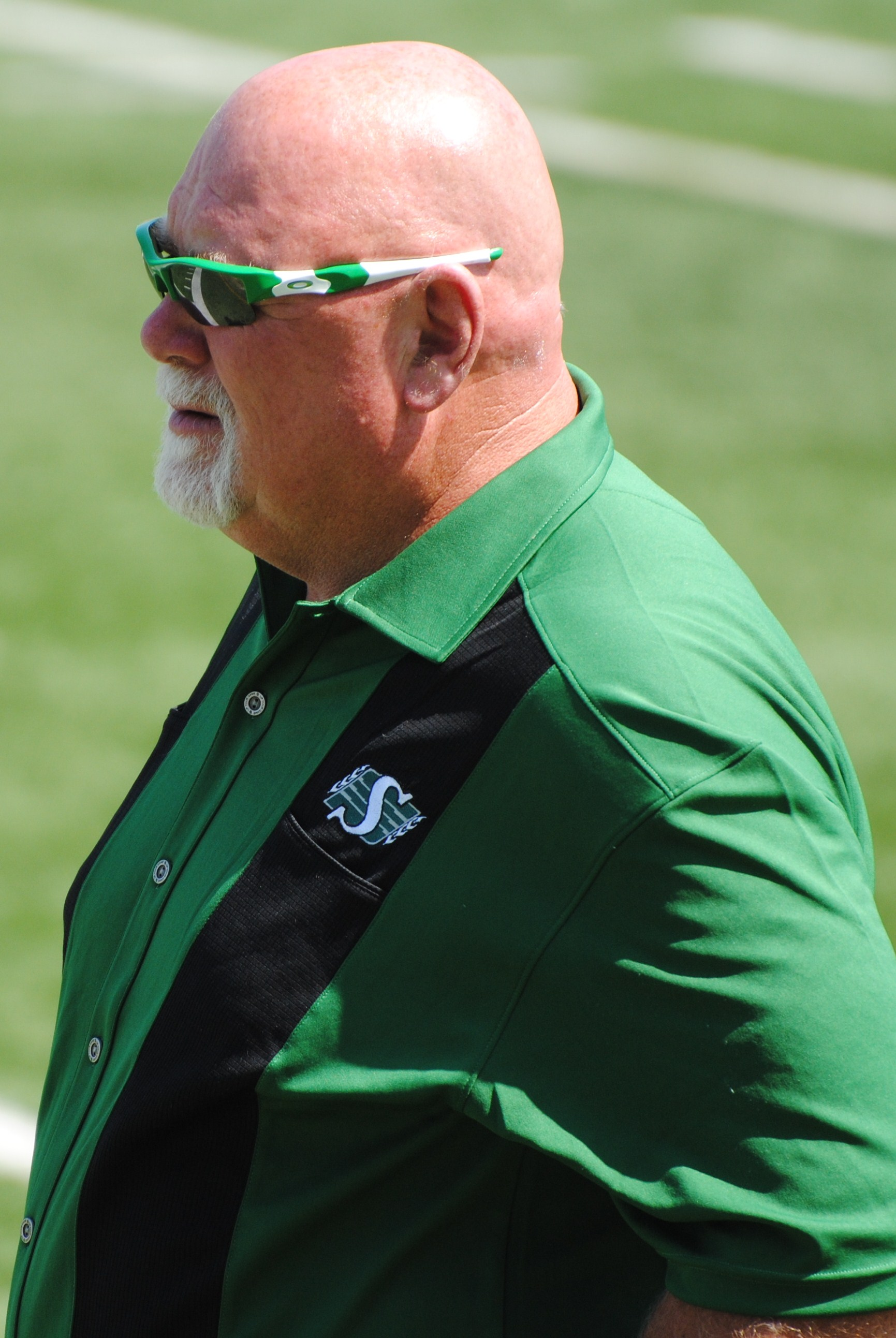
- Hopson in 2010

Profile
- Positions: Guard, Offensive tackle

Personal information
- Born: March 1, 1951; Regina, Saskatchewan, Canada
- Died: April 2, 2024 (aged 73)

Career information
- High school: Thom Collegiate
- CJFL: Regina Rams

Career history
- 1973–1976: Saskatchewan Roughriders
- Canadian Football Hall of Fame (Class of 2019)

James Douglas Hopson (March 1, 1951 – April 2, 2024) was a Canadian professional football player and executive. After playing as an offensive lineman, he served as the president and chief executive officer for the Saskatchewan Roughriders of the Canadian Football League (CFL). Hopson served in the latter role from 2005 until 2014. Under his stewardship, the Roughriders captured the Grey Cup in 2007 and 2013, and the team recorded record profits.

Born in Regina, Saskatchewan, Hopson was involved with football in Saskatchewan for much of his life. He played high school football for Thom Collegiate in Regina, and then joined the Regina Rams to play junior football. After completing his junior career, Hopson joined the Roughriders in 1973. He became a starter on the offensive line for the Roughriders in 1974, when his career overlapped with Roughrider greats Ron Lancaster and George Reed. During 1975 and 1976, Hopson played professional football while teaching in Lumsden, Saskatchewan. After the 1976 Grey Cup, which Saskatchewan lost to the Ottawa Rough Riders, Hopson retired to focus on his teaching career.

Hopson graduated from the University of Regina with a degree in education and went on to receive a master's degree from the University of Oregon. Divorced with two grown children, as of September 2010, he was engaged to marry Brenda Edwards. In 2021, Hopson was diagnosed with stage 4 colon cancer. He died from the disease on April 2, 2024, at the age of 73.
