= Bill Clarke (Canadian football) =

Canadian football player (1932–2000)

No. 60
- Positions: Defensive tackle, Offensive tackle

Personal information
- Born: November 25, 1932; Regina, Saskatchewan, Canada
- Died: December 20, 2000 (aged 68); Regina, Saskatchewan, Canada
- Listed height: 6 ft 4 in (1.93 m)
- Listed weight: 235 lb (107 kg)

Career information
- Junior team: Regina Dales

Career history
- 1951–1964: Saskatchewan Roughriders

Awards and highlights
- 2× CFL West All-Star (1961, 19630; Sask. Sports Hall of Fame (1979); Roughriders' Plaza of Honour (1988); 2× Stack Tibitts Trophy (1959, 1961)
- Canadian Football Hall of Fame (Class of 1996)

Norman Edwin William Clarke (November 25, 1932 – December 20, 2000) was a Canadian professional football player who played both defensive tackle and offensive tackle for the Saskatchewan Roughriders from 1951 through 1964. Clarke also was a curler, and won the inaugural Canadian schoolboy championships for Saskatchewan in 1950.

== Early life ==
Bill Clarke was born in Regina on November 25, 1932, to parents G.W.R. (Bill) and Ruth L. Clarke. He played junior football with the Regina Dales (later to become the Regina Rams) before turning professional with the Saskatchewan Roughriders in 1951.

== Professional career ==
Clarke became one of the longest-serving members of the Roughriders, playing 14 seasons as both an offensive and defensive tackle, including 8 seasons serving as the captain of the defence squad. He was awarded the Stack Tibitts Trophy as the Roughriders most valuable Canadian in 1959 and 1961 and was named to the Western Football Conference's All-Star team as a defensive tackle in 1961 and 1963. The 1963 Riders defence was notable for playing five games without yielding a touchdown.

Clarke's longtime dedication to the club was honoured with a life membership in 1963 and he was inducted into the Roughriders' Plaza of Honour in 1988. He retired from play following the 1964 CFL season.

== Post-football ==
After football, Clarke began a career as a public servant. In 1966, he was executive director of Sport and Recreation for Saskatchewan and from 1982 to 1987, he served as Deputy Minister of what is now the Department of Culture, Youth and Recreation. In addition, he was a member of numerous boards and committees including the Saskatchewan Games Council, the Canada Games Council, and Hockey Canada. As an advocate for the Special Olympics and the United Way, he also organised charity curling bonspiels and golf tournaments to raise money for Parkinson's disease research, a disease with which he was afflicted.

Clarke was admitted to the Saskatchewan Sports Hall of Fame in 1979 and the Canadian Football Hall of Fame in 1996. He received an honorary Doctorate of Law from the University of Regina in 1995.

He died December 20, 2000, in Regina, from Parkinson's disease.
