= Larry Dumelie =

Canadian football player

Profile
- Position: Defensive back

Personal information
- Born: December 7, 1936 (age 89); Lafleche, Saskatchewan, Canada

Career information
- College: Arizona

Career history
- 1960–1967: Saskatchewan Roughriders

Awards and highlights
- Grey Cup champion (1966)

Larry Dumelie (born December 7, 1936) is a former Canadian football defensive back who played for the Saskatchewan Roughriders of the Canadian Football League from 1960 to 1967. He was a member of their Grey-Cup winning team of 1966.

Larry Dumelie played college football at the University of Arizona for 3 years. Dumelie joined the Saskatchewan Roughriders in 1960 and played with them during his entire CFL career lasting 8 years, mostly as a defensive back. Playing between 11 and 16 games throughout his career, he intercepted 13 balls, 6 in 1964. He also served as a punt and kick returner, averaging 4.9 and 22.0 yards respectively, but never scored a touchdown . He was a member of the Roughriders' first Grey-Cup winning team of 1966.
