= Art McEwan =

Canadian football player (1924–1989)

Profile
- Position: Guard

Personal information
- Born: August 11, 1924; Montreal, Quebec
- Died: August 23, 1989 (aged 65); Surrey, British Columbia
- Listed height: 5 ft 10 in (1.78 m)
- Listed weight: 200 lb (91 kg)

Career history
- 1947–1954: Saskatchewan Roughriders

Arthur Billings McEwan (August 11, 1924 – August 23, 1989) was a Canadian professional football player who played for the Saskatchewan Roughriders. He played junior football in Montreal.
