= Walt Posadowski =

Canadian Football League coach

Personal information
- Born: c. 1937

Career information
- College: Villanova

Career history
- 1963–66: Bishop McDevitt HS (Head coach)
- 1967–68: Villanova (Part-time assistant)
- 1969–75: Villanova (Offensive line coach)
- 1976: Idaho State (Assistant coach)
- 1977–78: Saskatchewan Roughriders (Offensive line coach)
- 1978: Saskatchewan Roughriders (HC)
- 1980–81: Calgary Stampeders (assistant coach)

Walter Posadowski (born c. 1937) is a former Canadian Football League (CFL) coach who served as the head coach of the Saskatchewan Roughriders during the 1978 season.

== Playing career ==
Posadowski played at Villanova University from 1957 to 1959.

== Coaching career ==
Posadowski's coaching career began at Bishop McDevitt High School, where he compiled a 17-15-5 in four season as head football coach. He spent two seasons as a part-time assistant at Villanova before becoming the Wildcats offensive line coach in 1969. Posadowski spent one season (1976) as an assistant at Idaho State University.

Posadowski joined the Saskatchewan Roughriders in 1977 as offensive line coach. After a 0–5 start to the 1978 season, head coach Jim Eddy was fired and Posadowski was named head coach. The Roughriders finished the season 4-11-1 and Posadowski was replaced by retiring quarterback Ron Lancaster.

Following Lancaster's hiring, Posadowski was moved from the head coaching position to director of scouting and recruiting. Posadowski's final coaching position was as an assistant with the Calgary Stampeders.
