= Gord Barwell =

Canadian football player

Profile
- Positions: End, Wide receiver

Personal information
- Born: 1944; Saskatoon, Saskatchewan, Canada
- Died: April 21, 1988 (aged 43); Toronto, Ontario, Canada
- Listed height: 6 ft 0 in (1.83 m)
- Listed weight: 185 lb (84 kg)

Career history
- 1964–1973: Saskatchewan Roughriders

Awards and highlights
- Grey Cup champion (1966)

Gordon Keith Barwell (1944 – April 21, 1988) was a Canadian professional football player who played for the Saskatchewan Roughriders. In his 10 seasons with the Saskatchewan Roughriders, he amassed 242 catches, 4,314 yards, and 32 touchdowns. He won a Grey Cup as a member of the team in 1966. He previously played football on the Saskatoon Hilltops junior football team. In 1988, he died of brain cancer. He was a minister in his later years. Today, the Gord Barwell Award is awarded each year to a CFL player who exhibits exemplary Christian conduct and leadership both on and off the field.
