= Frederick S. Mannix =

Canadian businessman

Frederick Stephen Mannix
- Born: 3 February 1881; Stonewall, Manitoba, Canada
- Died: 14 July 1951 (aged 70); Calgary, Alberta, Canada
- Resting place: St Mary's Cemetery, Calgary
- Spouse: Byryid Helen Fitzpatrick (m. 1907; died 1931)
- Children: Frederick Charles Mannix

Frederick Stephen Mannix (3 February 1881 – 14 July 1951) was a Canadian businessman and the founder of Alberta's dynastic Mannix family. In 1898, Mannix started a contracting business and by the end of his life had built it into one of the largest construction firms in western Canada. Upon his death, the family business passed to his son Frederick Charles Mannix. The Mannix family business interests are now worth around $3.3 billion and are controlled by third-generation members Frederick Philip Mannix and Ronald Neil Mannix.

== Biography ==
Frederick Stephen Mannix was born on 3 February 1881 on a farm near Stonewall, Manitoba, to George Charles Mannix (1845–1934) and Frances Bunn (1849–1918).

Mannix's father, George Charles Mannix (1845 – 1934), was born in Courtmacsherry, County Cork, Ireland, and had come to Canada before Confederation with his two brothers. George fought with the Canadian Militia in both the Fenian raids and the Red River Rebellion, and then began homesteading in Manitoba.

In 1872, George married Frances Bunn (1849–1918). On her father's side, Bunn's great-grandfather was the Hudson's Bay Company fur trader William Sinclair (1794–1868). On her mother's side Bunn was descended from HBC officials Robert Campbell (1808–1894) and William McGillivray (1764–1825). Mannix and Bunn had three children together in addition to Frederick: William Alfred Victor (1875–1960), Leonard Nial (1887–1959), and Frances Alicia (1891–1976).

Frederick Stephen left school after the fourth grade to work on the family farm. In 1895, aged 14, he left home. In 1898 Mannix borrowed $200 from a stranger and used it to purchase four horses and a scraper. This purchase allowed Mannix to begin working in railway construction. In 1905 Mannix moved to Edmonton and took night courses to improve his education, while continuing to build his business. Having started in railway construction, Mannix expanded his business to road construction. In 1917 he moved to Calgary where he formed a partnership with W. A. Dutton (father of Norman "Red" Dutton). Mannix continued to grow his business and took on several heavy construction projects including the Lake Minnewanka Dam and Seebe Dam. In 1936 he formed the firm Fred Mannix & Co. Limited.

During World War II, the Mannix family struggled to acquire capital, and consequently, in 1943 they sold a 51% controlling interest in Fred Mannix & Co. to the Idaho company Morrison–Knudsen. The condition of the sale was that Frederick C. Mannix would remain president of the company. Over the next several years Frederick C. continued to amass wealth and in 1951, shortly before his father's death, he repurchased the company from the Americans.

In the 1930s Mannix was diagnosed with diabetes and in the early 1940s lost both legs. Frederick Stephen Mannix died on 14 July 1951 at age 70 at the Holy Cross Hospital. He is buried in St Mary's Cemetery in Calgary. At the time of his death Frederick Stephen's estate was worth approximately $1 million.

== Family ==
In 1907, Mannix married Byryid Helen Fitzpatrick (1890–1931). Fitzpatrick grew up on a farm near Stony Plain and was the daughter of Irish Catholics who had come to Canada in the 1870s. Frederick and Byryid had six children: Eleanor (1908 – 1935), Byryid Alicia (1909 – 2004), Margaret Nellie (1911 – 1997), Frederick Charles (1913 – 1995), Florence Evelyn (1915 – 2006), and Luella (1918 – 2006). In 1926 Byryid Mannix was diagnosed with cancer and died five years later at age 41. Frederick remarried to an American, Grace O'Hanlon. The marriage ended in divorce after eight years.

Frederick Stephen's son Frederick Charles made the Mannixes the first Alberta family worth over a billion dollars. After Frederick Charles's death in 1995, the family business interests passed to his sons Frederick Philip and Ronald Neil. Frederick Philip's son Frederick Howard is Canada's highest ranked polo player.

=== Descendants ===
- Frederick Stephen Mannix (1881–1951) ⚭ Byryid Helen Fitzpatrick (1890–1931)
  - Eleanor Mannix (1908–1935) ⚭ John J. Lynch (1908–1990)
  - Byryid Alicia Mannix (1909–2004) ⚭ Robert Alphonso Kramer (1906–1991)
  - Margaret Nellie Mannix (1911–1997) ⚭ Neil Robert Walsh (1909–2001)
  - Frederick Charles Mannix (1913–1995) ⚭ Margaret Ruth Broughton (1916–1979)
    - Frederick Philip Mannix (1942–) ⚭ Li-Anne Smith
      - Frederick Howard Mannix (1984–) ⚭ Kelsea Forzani
    - Maureen Gail Mannix ⚭ Edmond Eberts
    - Ronald Neil Mannix (1948–) ⚭ Diane Deacon
  - Dora Evelyn Florence Mannix (1915–2006) ⚭ Norman Peter Ostrem Pallesen (1914–1994)
  - Luella Mannix (1918–2006) ⚭ Eric Donald Wilson (1917–2007)
