= Elizabeth A. Mannix =

American management academic

Elizabeth A. Mannix is the professor of Management and Organizations at Cornell University's Johnson Graduate School of Management, and the Director of the Institute for the Social Sciences at Cornell University. She obtained her PhD from the University of Chicago.

Professor Mannix's research and teaching interests include: effective performance in organizational teams, power and alliances, negotiation and conflict, organizational change and leadership. Recently, she has been studying the effects of informal power in teams, and the multi-faceted effects of diversity on performance in organizational groups.

== Published work ==
Professor Mannix's work has been published in such journals as: Administrative Science Quarterly, Organizational Behavior and Human Decision Processes, Journal of Experimental Social Psychology, Journal of Personality and Social Psychology, Journal of Applied Psychology, and the Academy of Management Journal. She is the co-editor of the book series Research on Managing Groups and Teams, now in its 9th volume. Mannix is also an associate editor of the Academy of Management Review. She received the 2000-2001 Clifford H. Whitcomb Faculty Fellowship, as well as the 2001 EMBA Globe Award for Excellence in teaching.

Selected publications include:

- Mannix, E. A., M. Neale, M., and S. Blount-Lyon, Eds. (2004). Research in Managing Groups and Teams: Temporal Issues. Oxford: Elsevier Science Press.
- Lovaglia, M., Mannix, E., Samuelson, C., Sell, J., & Wilson, R. (2004). "Conflict, power and status in groups" in M. S. Poole & A. B. Hollingshead (Eds). Theories of Small Groups: Interdisciplinary Perspectives. Sage Publications: Thousand Oaks, CA.
- Jackson, K., E. Mannix, R. Peterson and W. Trochim (2004), A Multi-Faceted Approach to Intra-Group Conflict: Issues of Theory and Measure. Ithaca, Center for Leadership - JGSM Cornell.
- Jackson, K., R. Peterson, E. Mannix and W. Trochim (2004), Exploring Conflict Resolution Strategies: Building Towards a Theory and Measurement. Ithaca, Center for Leadership - JGSM Cornell.
- Mannix, E. and K. A. Jehn (2004). "Let's Storm and Norm, but Not Right Now: Investigating Models of Group Development and Performance" in Research on Managing Groups and Teams: Temporal Issues. Oxford: Elsevier Science Press. 6.
