= Fred Mannix =

Canadian billionaire businessman

Fred Mannix OC AOE
- Born: Frederick Philip Mannix; February 24, 1942 (age 84)
- Occupation: Businessman
- Title: Chairman, Mancal Corporation
- Spouse: Li-Anne Smith
- Children: 5, including Fred Mannix Jr.

Frederick Philip Mannix OC AOE (born February 24, 1942) is a Canadian billionaire businessman, and the chairman of the privately held Mancal Group, which is active in real estate, ranching, coal, oil and gas.

== Early life ==
Fred Mannix was born on February 24, 1942. He is the eldest son of Frederick Charles Mannix and Margaret Mannix, and the grandson of Frederick Stephen Mannix. He has a brother, Ron, and a sister, Maureen. In 1966, he earned a bachelor's degree from the University of Alberta.

== Career ==
In 2018, Canadian Business estimated the joint net worth of Fred and Ron Mannix at CA$3.3 billion.

== Honours ==
In 2005, Mannix was made an Officer of the Order of Canada. In 2014, he was made a Member of the Alberta Order of Excellence.

== Personal life ==
In 1982, he married Li-Anne Smith, and they have five children, including Fred Mannix Jr., a leading polo player.
