= Fred Mannix Jr. =

Canadian polo player

- Born: 1983 or 1984 (age 41–42)
- Occupation: Polo player
- Parent(s): Fred Mannix; Li-Anne Smith

Fred Mannix Jr. (born 1984) is a Canadian polo player.

He grew up in Calgary, the son of billionaire businessman Fred Mannix.

Mannix is the highest ranked Canadian polo player on the world polo tour. He is the first Canadian in 65 years to take part in all three legs of Polo's Triple Crown, and believed to be only the second Canadian to play in the Argentine Open.
