= List of Calgary Stampeders seasons =

This is a complete list of seasons competed by the Calgary Stampeders, a Canadian Football League team. The team was founded in 1945. Throughout their history, the Stampeders have won eight Grey Cups.

Grey Cup Championships †	West Division Championships *	Regular season championships ^

League season	Club season	League	Division	Finish	Wins	Losses	Ties	Playoffs
Calgary Stampeders
1945	1945	WIFU	–	No season play				Won W.I.F.U. Semi-Finals (Roughriders) 2–0 series Lost W.I.F.U. Final (Blue Bombers) 9–6
1946	1946	WIFU	–	1st^	5	3	0	Lost W.I.F.U. Finals (Blue Bombers) 1–1 series
1947	1947	WIFU	–	2nd	4	4	0	Lost W.I.F.U. Finals (Blue Bombers) 1–2 series
1948	1948	WIFU†*	–	1st^	12	0	0	Won W.I.F.U. Finals (Roughriders) 1–0–1 series Won Grey Cup (Rough Riders) 12–7
1949	1949	WIFU*	–	1st^	13	1	0	Won W.I.F.U. Finals (Roughriders) 1–1 series Lost Grey Cup (Alouettes) 28–15
1950	1950	WIFU	–	4th	4	10	0	
1951	1951	WIFU	–	4th	4	10	0	
1952	1952	WIFU	–	3rd	7	9	0	Lost W.I.F.U. Semi-Finals (Eskimos) 1–1 series
1953	1953	WIFU	–	4th	3	12	1	
1954	1954	WIFU	–	4th	8	8	0	
1955	1955	WIFU	–	5th	4	12	0	
1956	1956	WIFU	–	5th	4	12	0	
1957	1957	WIFU	–	3rd	6	10	0	Lost W.I.F.U. Semi-Finals (Blue Bombers) 0–1–1 series
1958	1958	CFL	W.I.F.U.	4th	6	9	1	
1959	1959	CFL	W.I.F.U.	4th	8	8	0	
1960	1960	CFL	W.I.F.U.	3rd	6	8	2	Lost West Semi-Finals (Eskimos) 0–2 series
1961	1961	CFL	West	3rd	7	9	0	Won West Semi-Finals (Eskimos) 1–1 series Lost West Finals (Blue Bombers) 0–2 series
1962	1962	CFL	West	2nd	9	6	1	Won West Semi-Finals (Roughriders) 2–0 series Lost West Finals (Blue Bombers) 1–2 series
1963	1963	CFL	West	2nd	10	4	2	Lost West Finals (Roughriders) 1–1 series
1964	1964	CFL	West	2nd	12	4	0	Won West Semi-Finals (Roughriders) 1–1 series Lost West Finals (Lions) 1–2 series
1965	1965	CFL	West	1st^	12	4	0	Lost West Finals (Blue Bombers) 1–2 series
1966	1966	CFL	West	4th	6	9	1	
1967	1967	CFL	West	1st^	12	4	0	Lost West Finals (Roughriders) 1–2 series
1968	1968	CFL	West*	2nd	10	6	0	Won West Semi-Final (Eskimos) 29–13; Won West Finals (Roughriders) 2–0 series Lost Grey Cup (Rough Riders) 24–21
1969	1969	CFL	West	2nd	9	7	0	Won West Semi-Final (Lions) 35–21; Lost West Finals (Roughriders) 0–2 series
1970	1970	CFL	West*	3rd	9	7	0	Won West Semi-Final (Eskimos) 16–9; Won West Finals (Roughriders) 2–1 series Lost Grey Cup (Alouettes) 23–10
1971	1971	CFL†	West*	1st^	9	6	1	Won West Finals (Roughriders) 2–0 series Won Grey Cup (Argonauts) 14–11
1972	1972	CFL	West	4th	6	10	0	
1973	1973	CFL	West	4th	6	10	0	
1974	1974	CFL	West	5th	6	10	0	
1975	1975	CFL	West	4th	6	10	0	
1976	1976	CFL	West	5th	2	12	2	
1977	1977	CFL	West	5th	4	12	0	
1978	1978	CFL	West	2nd	9	4	3	Won West Semi-Final (Blue Bombers) 38–4; Lost West Final (Eskimos) 26–13
1979	1979	CFL	West	2nd	12	4	0	Won West Semi-Final (Lions) 37–2; Lost West Finals (Eskimos) 19–7
1980	1980	CFL	West	3rd	9	7	0	Lost West Semi-Final (Blue Bombers) 32–14
1981	1981	CFL	West	5th	6	10	0	
1982	1982	CFL	West	3rd	9	6	1	Lost West Semi-Final (Blue Bombers) 24–3
1983	1983	CFL	West	4th	8	8	0	
1984	1984	CFL	West	5th	6	10	0	
1985	1985	CFL	West	5th	3	13	0	
1986	1986	CFL	West	4th	11	7	0	Lost West Semi-Final (Eskimos) 27–18
1987	1987	CFL	West	3rd	10	8	0	Lost West Semi-Final (Eskimos) 30–16
1988	1988	CFL	West	4th	6	12	0	
1989	1989	CFL	West	2nd	10	8	0	Lost West Semi-Final (Roughriders) 33–26
1990	1990	CFL	West	1st^	11	6	1	Lost West Final (Eskimos) 43–23
1991	1991	CFL	West*	2nd	11	7	0	Won West Semi-Final (Lions) 43–41; Won West Final (Eskimos) 38–36; Lost Grey Cup (Argonauts) 36–21
1992	1992	CFL†	West*	1st^	13	5	0	Won West Final (Eskimos) 23–22; Won Grey Cup (Blue Bombers) 24–10
1993	1993	CFL	West	1st^	15	3	0	Won West Semi-Final (Lions) 17–9; Lost West Final (Eskimos) 29–15
1994	1994	CFL	West	1st^	15	3	0	Won West Semi-Final (Roughriders) 36–3; Lost West Final (Lions) 37–36
1995	1995	CFL	North*	1st^	15	3	0	Won North Semi-Final (Tiger-Cats) 31–13; Won North Final (Eskimos) 37–4; Lost Grey Cup (Stallions) 37–20
1996	1996	CFL	West	1st^	13	5	0	Lost West Final (Eskimos) 15–12
1997	1997	CFL	West	2nd	10	8	0	Lost West Semi-Final (Roughriders) 33–30
1998	1998	CFL†	West*	1st^	12	6	0	Won West Final (Eskimos) 33–10; Won Grey Cup (Tiger-Cats) 26–24
1999	1999	CFL	West*	2nd	12	6	0	Won West Semi-Final (Eskimos) 30–17; Won West Final (Lions) 26–24; Lost Grey Cup (Tiger-Cats) 32–21
2000	2000	CFL	West	1st^	12	5	1	Lost West Final (Lions) 37–23
2001	2001	CFL†	West*	2nd	8	10	0	Won West Semi-Final (Lions) 28–19; Won West Final (Eskimos) 34–16; Won Grey Cup (Blue Bombers) 27–19
2002	2002	CFL	West	5th	6	12	0	
2003	2003	CFL	West	5th	5	13	0	
2004	2004	CFL	West	5th	4	14	0	
2005	2005	CFL	West	2nd	11	7	0	Lost West Semi-Final (Eskimos) 33–26
2006	2006	CFL	West	2nd	10	8	0	Lost West Semi-Final (Roughriders) 30–21
2007	2007	CFL	West	3rd	7	10	1	Lost West Semi-Final (Roughriders) 26–24
2008	2008	CFL†	West*	1st^	13	5	0	Won West Final (Lions) 22–18; Won Grey Cup (Alouettes) 22–14
2009	2009	CFL	West	2nd	10	7	1	Won West Semi-Final (Eskimos) 24–21; Lost West Final (Roughriders) 27–17
2010	2010	CFL	West	1st^	13	5	0	Lost West Final (Roughriders) 20–16
2011	2011	CFL	West	3rd	11	7	0	Lost West Semi-Final (Eskimos) 33–19
2012	2012	CFL	West*	2nd	12	6	0	Won West Semi-Final (Roughriders) 36–30; Won West Final (Lions) 34–29; Lost Grey Cup (Argonauts) 35–22
2013	2013	CFL	West	1st^	14	4	0	Lost West Final (Roughriders) 35–13
2014	2014	CFL†	West*	1st^	15	3	0	Won West Final (Eskimos) 43–18; Won Grey Cup (Tiger-Cats) 20–16
2015	2015	CFL	West	2nd	14	4	0	Won West Semi-Final (Lions) 35–9; Lost West Final (Eskimos) 45–31
2016	2016	CFL	West*	1st^	15	2	1	Won West Final (Lions) 42–15; Lost Grey Cup (Redblacks) 39–33
2017	2017	CFL	West*	1st^	13	4	1	Won West Final (Eskimos) 32–28; Lost Grey Cup (Argonauts) 27–24
2018	2018	CFL†	West*	1st^	13	5	0	Won West Final (Blue Bombers) 22–14; Won Grey Cup (Redblacks) 27–16
2019	2019	CFL	West	2nd	12	6	0	Lost West Semi-Final (Blue Bombers) 35–14
2020	2020	CFL	West	Season cancelled due to the COVID-19 pandemic				
2021	2021	CFL	West	3rd	8	6	0	Lost West Semi-Final (Roughriders) 33–30
2022	2022	CFL	West	3rd	12	6	0	Lost West Semi-Final (Lions) 30–16
2023	2023	CFL	West	3rd	6	12	0	Lost West Semi-Final (Lions) 41–30
2024	2024	CFL	West	5th	5	12	1	
2025	2025	CFL	West	3rd	11	7	0	Lost West Semi-Final (Lions) 33–30
2026	2026	CFL	West	5th	9	9	0	
Regular season Totals (1945–2026)					724	584	22	
Playoff Totals (1945–2026)					48	51	2	
Grey Cup Totals (1945–2026)					8	9		

== See also ==
- List of Calgary Bronks (football) seasons
