= 1946 Saskatchewan Roughriders season =

CFL team season

- Head coach: Ken Preston
- Home stadium: Taylor Field

Results
- Record: 2–6
- Division place: 3rd, West

The 1946 Saskatchewan Roughriders season was the 32nd season of the franchise. It was the first season under the name of Saskatchewan, as the team decided to change the name from Regina in the offseason, although the name change was not official until 1950.

== Standings ==
Western Interprovincial Football Union
Team	GP	W	L	T	PF	PA	Pts
Calgary Stampeders	8	5	3	0	60	37	10
Winnipeg Blue Bombers	8	5	3	0	69	46	10
Saskatchewan Roughriders	8	2	6	0	46	92	4

== Schedule ==
Game	Date	Opponent	Results		Venue
Game	Date	Opponent	Score	Record	Venue
1	September 2	at Calgary Stampeders	L 0–9	0–1	Mewata Stadium
2	September 7	vs. Calgary Stampeders	L 0–6	0–2	Taylor Field
3	September 14	vs. Winnipeg Blue Bombers	L 11–17	0–3	Taylor Field
4	September 21	at Calgary Stampeders	L 7–19	0–4	Mewata Stadium
5	September 28	at Winnipeg Blue Bombers	L 0–6	0–5	Osborne Stadium
6	October 5	vs. Calgary Stampeders	W 10–9	1–5	Taylor Field
7	October 14	vs. Winnipeg Blue Bombers	L 0–9	1–6	Taylor Field
8	October 19	at Winnipeg Blue Bombers	W 18–17	2–6	Osborne Stadium

== WIFU All-Stars ==
- HB – Sully Glasser
- E – Johnny Bell
- T – Andrew Nagy
