= 1952 Calgary Stampeders season =

Canadian football team season

- Head coach: Les Lear
- Home stadium: Mewata Stadium

Results
- Record: 7–9
- Division place: 3rd
- Playoffs: Lost W.I.F.U. Semi-Finals

The 1952 Calgary Stampeders finished in third place in the W.I.F.U. with a 7–9 record. They were defeated in the W.I.F.U. Semi-Finals by the Edmonton Eskimos.

== Regular season ==
=== Season standings ===
Western Interprovincial Football Union
Team	GP	W	L	T	PF	PA	Pts
Winnipeg Blue Bombers	16	12	3	1	394	211	25
Edmonton Eskimos	16	9	6	1	291	280	19
Calgary Stampeders	16	7	9	0	293	340	14
Saskatchewan Roughriders	16	3	13	0	216	363	6

=== Season schedule ===
Week	Game	Date	Opponent	Results		Venue	Attendance
Week	Game	Date	Opponent	Score	Record	Venue	Attendance
	1	Sat, Aug 23	at Winnipeg Blue Bombers	W 12–8	1–0	Osborne Stadium	10,000
	2	Mon, Aug 25	at Saskatchewan Roughriders	W 21–14	2–0	Taylor Field	1,000
	3	Sat, Aug 30	vs. Edmonton Eskimos	W 14–7	3–0	Mewata Stadium	12,000
	4	Mon, Sept 1	at Edmonton Eskimos	L 10–17	3–1	Clarke Stadium	13,172
	5	Sat, Sept 6	vs. Saskatchewan Roughriders	L 8–18	3–2	Mewata Stadium	12,000
	6	Mon, Sept 8	vs. Winnipeg Blue Bombers	L 6–7	3–3	Mewata Stadium	14,000
	7	Sat, Sept 13	at Saskatchewan Roughriders	W 30–20	4–3	Taylor Field	10,500
	8	Sat, Sept 20	at Edmonton Eskimos	L 18–35	4–4	Clarke Stadium	14,922
	9	Mon, Sept 22	vs. Edmonton Eskimos	L 9–10	4–5	Mewata Stadium	
	10	Sat, Sept 27	at Saskatchewan Roughriders	W 16–9	5–5	Taylor Field	12,000
	11	Mon, Sept 29	at Winnipeg Blue Bombers	L 28–39	5–6	Osborne Stadium	9,600
	12	Sat, Oct 4	vs. Winnipeg Blue Bombers	L 30–41	5–7	Mewata Stadium	12,000
	13	Mon, Oct 6	vs. Saskatchewan Roughriders	W 30–27	6–7	Mewata Stadium	11,000
	14	Sat, Oct 11	at Edmonton Eskimos	W 33–30	7–7	Clarke Stadium	13,000
	15	Mon, Oct 13	vs. Edmonton Eskimos	L 10–16	7–8	Mewata Stadium	12,000
	16	Sat, Oct 18	vs. Winnipeg Blue Bombers	L 18–42	7–9	Mewata Stadium	

== Playoffs ==
=== SEMI-FINALS ===
WIFU Semi-Finals – Game 1
Edmonton Eskimos @ Calgary Stampeders
Date	Away	Home
October 25?	Edmonton Eskimos 12	Calgary Stampeders 31

WIFU Semi-Finals – Game 2
Calgary Stampeders @ Edmonton Eskimos
Date	Away	Home
October 27?	Calgary Stampeders 7	Edmonton Eskimos 30

- Edmonton won the total-point series by 42–38. The Eskimos will play the Winnipeg Blue Bombers in the WIFU Finals.
