= 1959 Winnipeg Blue Bombers season =

Canadian football team season

- General manager: Jim Ausley
- President: Ralph Parliament
- Head coach: Bud Grant
- Home stadium: Winnipeg Stadium

Results
- Record: 12–4
- Division place: 1st, WIFU
- Playoffs: Won Grey Cup

The 1959 Winnipeg Blue Bombers finished in first place in the WIFU division with a 12–4 record. The Blue Bombers repeated as Grey Cup champions, having defeated the Hamilton Tiger-Cats once again to win the 47th Grey Cup.

== Preseason ==
Game	Date	Opponent	Results		Venue	Attendance
Game	Date	Opponent	Score	Record	Venue	Attendance
A	Aug 4	at Montreal Alouettes	W 39–34	1–0	McGill Stadium	21,739
A	Aug 6	vs. Hamilton Tiger-Cats	L 5–8	1–1	Winnipeg Stadium	18,073

== Regular season ==
=== Standings ===
Western Interprovincial Football Union
Team	GP	W	L	T	PF	PA	Pts
Winnipeg Blue Bombers	16	12	4	0	418	272	24
Edmonton Eskimos	16	10	6	0	370	221	20
BC Lions	16	9	7	0	306	301	18
Calgary Stampeders	16	8	8	0	356	301	16
Saskatchewan Roughriders	16	1	15	0	212	567	2

=== Schedule ===
Week	Game	Date	Opponent	Results		Venue	Attendance
Week	Game	Date	Opponent	Score	Record	Venue	Attendance
1	1	Thu, Aug 13	at BC Lions	W 42–20	1–0	Empire Stadium	29,425
1	2	Mon, Aug 17	at Calgary Stampeders	W 22–21	2–0	Mewata Stadium	16,200
2	3	Thu, Aug 20	vs. Calgary Stampeders	L 22–23	2–1	Winnipeg Stadium	18,333
3	4	Thu, Aug 27	vs. Edmonton Eskimos	L 1–16	2–2	Winnipeg Stadium	18,928
3	5	Sat, Aug 29	at Saskatchewan Roughriders	W 61–8	3–2	Taylor Field	12,000
4	6	Thu, Sept 3	vs. BC Lions	W 34–23	4–2	Winnipeg Stadium	18,003
4	7	Sat, Sept 5	at Edmonton Eskimos	W 16–8	5–2	Clarke Stadium	17,143
5	8	Sat, Sept 12	vs. Saskatchewan Roughriders	W 41–14	6–2	Winnipeg Stadium	15,962
6	9	Sat, Sept 19	at BC Lions	L 6–17	6–3	Empire Stadium	32,061
6	10	Mon, Sept 21	at Calgary Stampeders	W 15–10	7–3	Mewata Stadium	16,000
7	11	Mon, Sept 28	vs. Edmonton Eskimos	W 13–10	8–3	Winnipeg Stadium	17,707
8	12	Mon, Oct 5	vs. Calgary Stampeders	W 38–24	9–3	Winnipeg Stadium	15,813
9	13	Mon, Oct 12	at Saskatchewan Roughriders	W 27–14	10–3	Taylor Field	8,000
10	14	Sat, Oct 17	vs. BC Lions	W 31–6	11–3	Winnipeg Stadium	18,184
10	15	Mon, Oct 19	at Edmonton Eskimos	L 20–21	11–4	Clarke Stadium	15,500
11	16	Mon, Oct 26	vs. Saskatchewan Roughriders	W 2–0†	12–4	Winnipeg Stadium	14,279

^{†} Actual game was won by Saskatchewan 37–30 but was immediately forfeited under CFL rules; the Roughriders had no healthy quarterback and resorted to suiting up their coach, Frank Trupicka, who as an American national was ineligible to be added to the roster at such a late date in the season.

== Playoffs ==
Round	Date	Opponent	Results		Venue	Attendance
Round	Date	Opponent	Score	Record	Venue	Attendance
West Final #1	Wed, Nov 11	at Edmonton Eskimos	W 19–11	1–0	Clarke Stadium	19,000
West Final #2	Sat, Nov 14	vs. Edmonton Eskimos	W 16–8	2–0	Winnipeg Stadium	15,872
47th Grey Cup	Sun, Nov 28	Hamilton Tiger-Cats	W 21–7	3–0	Exhibition Stadium	33,133

=== Grey Cup ===
Team	Q1	Q2	Q3	Q4	Total
Winnipeg Blue Bombers	3	0	1	17	21
Hamilton Tiger-Cats	0	1	6	0	7
