= 1948 Calgary Stampeders season =

Canadian football team season

- Head coach: Les Lear
- Home stadium: Mewata Stadium

Results
- Record: 12–0
- Division place: 1st, W.I.F.U.
- Playoffs: Won Grey Cup

The 1948 Calgary Stampeders finished in first place in the W.I.F.U. with a perfect 12–0 record, went 2–0–1 in the playoffs and won the Grey Cup.

To date, this is still the only undefeated season in the history of Canadian professional football.

== Preseason ==
Game	Date	Opponent	Results		Venue	Attendance
Game	Date	Opponent	Score	Record	Venue	Attendance
A	Sat, Aug 21	vs. Toronto Beaches-Indians	W 16–7	1–0	Mewata Stadium	6,000

== Regular season ==
=== Season standings ===
Western Interprovincial Football Union
Team	GP	W	L	T	PF	PA	Pts
Calgary Stampeders	12	12	0	0	218	61	24
Regina Roughriders	12	3	9	0	133	137	6
Winnipeg Blue Bombers	12	3	9	0	81	234	6

=== Season schedule ===
Week	Game	Date	Opponent	Results		Venue	Attendance
Week	Game	Date	Opponent	Score	Record	Venue	Attendance
1	Bye						
2	1	Wed, Aug 25	vs. Regina Roughriders	W 12–1	1–0	Mewata Stadium	4,500
2	2	Mon, Aug 30	vs. Winnipeg Blue Bombers	W 30–0	2–0	Mewata Stadium	5,000
3	3	Fri, Sept 3	at Winnipeg Blue Bombers	W 10–5	3–0	Osborne Stadium	6,000
3	4	Mon, Sept 6	at Regina Roughriders	W 14–9	4–0	Taylor Field	6,000
4	5	Mon, Sept 13	vs. Winnipeg Blue Bombers	W 18–0	5–0	Mewata Stadium	7,200
5	Bye						
6	6	Sat, Sept 25	vs. Regina Roughriders	W 13–12	6–0	Mewata Stadium	7,000
7	7	Sat, Oct 2	at Regina Roughriders	W 12–11	7–0	Taylor Field	5,500
7	8	Mon, Oct 4	at Winnipeg Blue Bombers	W 26–6	8–0	Osborne Stadium	7,000
8	9	Sat, Oct 9	vs. Winnipeg Blue Bombers	W 35–3	9–0	Mewata Stadium	7,000
9	10	Sat, Oct 16	at Regina Roughriders	W 8–7	10–0	Taylor Field	5,000
9	11	Mon, Oct 18	at Winnipeg Blue Bombers	W 21–8	11–0	Osborne Stadium	4,000
10	12	Sat, Oct 23	vs. Regina Roughriders	W 19–0	12–0	Mewata Stadium	9,000

== Playoffs ==
=== Finals ===
WIFU Finals – Game 1
Calgary Stampeders @ Regina Roughriders
Date	Away	Home
November 6	Calgary Stampeders 4	Regina Roughriders 4

WIFU Finals – Game 2
Regina Roughriders @ Calgary Stampeders
Date	Away	Home
November 11	Regina Roughriders 6	Calgary Stampeders 17

- Calgary won the total-point series 21–10, thus advancing to the Grey Cup game.

=== Grey Cup ===
November 27 36th Annual Grey Cup Game: Varsity Stadium – Toronto, Ontario
WIFU Champion	IRFU Champion
Calgary Stampeders 12	Ottawa Rough Riders 7
The Calgary Stampeders are the 1948 Grey Cup Champions
