= 1945 Calgary Stampeders season =

Canadian football team season

- Head coach: Dean Griffing
- Home stadium: Mewata Stadium

Results
- Record: 0–0 (no regular season play)
- Playoffs: Lost W.I.F.U. Final

The 1945 Calgary Stampeders season was the first season for the team under the name "Stampeders" (They were previously known as the "Bronks") and their seventh overall. There was no regular season play in 1945. The W.I.F.U. suspended operations during World War II and did not return to action until the 1945 playoffs.

The new team was formed in the fall of 1945 by veteran football players and soldiers returning to civilian life.

The Stampeders were defeated in the W.I.F.U. Finals by the Winnipeg Blue Bombers.

== Regular season ==
During the Second World War, The W.I.F.U. decided to cancel its 1942 to 1945 seasons. However, in 1945, the war was over and the W.I.F.U. decided to hold playoffs for the year of 1945 despite the fact that no regular season games were played. All W.I.F.U. teams were automatically entered into the 1945 playoffs.

== Playoffs ==
Round	Date	Opponent	Results		Venue
Round	Date	Opponent	Score	Record	Venue
WIFU Semi-Finals Game 1	October 31	at Regina Roughriders	W 3–1	1–0	Taylor Field
WIFU Semi-Finals Game 2	November 3	vs. Regina Roughriders	W 12–0	2–0	Mewata Stadium
WIFU Finals	November 10	at Winnipeg Blue Bombers	L 4–9	2–1	Osborne Stadium
