= 1951 Toronto Argonauts season =

CFL team season

- Head coach: Frank Clair
- Home stadium: Varsity Stadium

Results
- Record: 7–5
- Division place: 3rd, IRFU
- Playoffs: Lost IRFU Semi-Final

The 1951 Toronto Argonauts finished in third place in the Interprovincial Rugby Football Union with a 7–5 record and appeared in the IRFU Semi-Final.

== Preseason ==
The Argos played a preseason game in Buffalo, New York.

| Week | Date | Opponent | Results | | Venue | Attendance |
| Week | Date | Opponent | Score | Record | Venue | Attendance |
|---|---|---|---|---|---|---|
| A | Sat, Aug 11 | vs. Hamilton Tiger-Cats | L 11–17 | 0–1 | Civic Stadium | 18,146 |
| B | Sat, Aug 18 | at Calgary Stampeders | W 36–35 | 1–1 | Mewata Stadium | 12,500 |
| B | Mon, Aug 20 | at Winnipeg Blue Bombers | L 1–13 | 1–2 | Osborne Stadium | 9,500 |

- Game vs. Hamilton Tiger-Cats was in Buffalo, New York.

== Regular season ==
=== Standings ===
Interprovincial Rugby Football Union
| Team | GP | W | L | T | PF | PA | Pts |
|---|---|---|---|---|---|---|---|
| Ottawa Rough Riders | 12 | 7 | 5 | 0 | 218 | 197 | 14 |
| Hamilton Tiger-Cats | 12 | 7 | 5 | 0 | 229 | 131 | 14 |
| Toronto Argonauts | 12 | 7 | 5 | 0 | 226 | 205 | 14 |
| Montreal Alouettes | 12 | 3 | 9 | 0 | 146 | 286 | 6 |

=== Schedule ===
| Week | Game | Date | Opponent | Results | | Venue | Attendance |
| Week | Game | Date | Opponent | Score | Record | Venue | Attendance |
|---|---|---|---|---|---|---|---|
| 1 | 1 | Sat, Sept 1 | at Ottawa Rough Riders | W 36–17 | 1–0 | Lansdowne Park | 15,000 |
| 1 | 2 | Mon, Sept 3 | at Hamilton Tiger-Cats | L 6–27 | 1–1 | Civic Stadium | 15,000 |
| 2 | 3 | Sat, Sept 8 | vs. Hamilton Tiger-Cats | L 2–21 | 1–2 | Varsity Stadium | 23,375 |
| 3 | 4 | Sat, Sept 15 | vs. Montreal Alouettes | L 6–8 | 1–3 | Varsity Stadium | 18,200 |
| 4 | 5 | Sat, Sept 22 | vs. Ottawa Rough Riders | W 17–10 | 2–3 | Varsity Stadium | 16,250 |
| 5 | Bye | | | | | | |
| 6 | 6 | Sat, Oct 6 | vs. Hamilton Tiger-Cats | L 6–22 | 2–4 | Varsity Stadium | 26,000 |
| 6 | 7 | Mon, Oct 8 | at Hamilton Tiger-Cats | W 10–0 | 3–4 | Civic Stadium | 14,000 |
| 7 | 8 | Sat, Oct 13 | at Ottawa Rough Riders | W 28–19 | 4–4 | Lansdowne Park | 15,000 |
| 8 | 9 | Sat, Oct 20 | vs. Montreal Alouettes | W 35–11 | 5–4 | Varsity Stadium | 16,623 |
| 8 | 10 | Sun, Oct 21 | at Montreal Alouettes | W 35–18 | 6–4 | Delorimier Stadium | 12,309 |
| 9 | 11 | Sun, Oct 28 | at Montreal Alouettes | L 22–34 | 6–5 | Delorimier Stadium | 9,215 |
| 10 | 12 | Sat, Nov 3 | vs. Ottawa Rough Riders | W 23–18 | 7–5 | Varsity Stadium | 21,844 |

== Postseason ==
| Round | Date | Opponent | Results | | Venue | Attendance |
| Round | Date | Opponent | Score | Record | Venue | Attendance |
|---|---|---|---|---|---|---|
| IRFU Semi-Final Game 1 | Nov 7 | vs. Hamilton Tiger-Cats | L 7–24 | 0–1 | Varsity Stadium | 12,200 |
| IRFU Semi-Final Game 2 | Nov 10 | at Hamilton Tiger-Cats | W 21–7 | 1–1 | Civic Stadium | 15,000 |
