= 1947 Calgary Stampeders season =

Canadian football team season

- Head coach: Unknown
- Home stadium: Mewata Stadium

Results
- Record: 4–4
- Division place: 2nd
- Playoffs: Lost W.I.F.U. Finals

The 1947 Calgary Stampeders finished in second place in the W.I.F.U. with a 4–4 record. They were defeated in the W.I.F.U. Finals by the Winnipeg Blue Bombers.

== Regular season ==
=== Season standings ===
Western Interprovincial Football Union
Team	GP	W	L	T	PF	PA	Pts
Winnipeg Blue Bombers	8	5	3	0	83	83	10
Calgary Stampeders	8	4	4	0	79	93	8
Regina Roughriders	8	3	5	0	78	64	6

=== Season schedule ===
Game	Date	Opponent	Result		Venue	Attendance
Game	Date	Opponent	Score	Record	Venue	Attendance
1	Mon, Sept 8	vs. Winnipeg Blue Bombers	L 11–13	0–1	Mewata Stadium	4,000
2	Sat, Sept 13	vs. Regina Roughriders	W 16–11	1–1	Mewata Stadium	3,000
3	Sat, Sept 27	at Regina Roughriders	L 7–12	1–2	Taylor Field	4,000
4	Mon, Sept 29	at Winnipeg Blue Bombers	L 0–16	1–3	Osborne Stadium	5,000
5	Sat, Oct 6	vs. Regina Roughriders	W 9–8	2–3	Mewata Stadium	3,000
6	Sat, Oct 11	vs. Winnipeg Blue Bombers	W 25–13	3–3	Mewata Stadium	3,000
7	Sat, Oct 25	at Regina Roughriders	W 6–5	4–3	Taylor Field	5,000
8	Mon, Oct 27	at Winnipeg Blue Bombers	L 5–15	4–4	Osborne Stadium	4,000

== Playoffs ==
Round	Date	Opponent	Result		Venue	Attendance
Round	Date	Opponent	Score	Record	Venue	Attendance
WIFU Finals Game 1	Sat, Nov 1	at Winnipeg Blue Bombers	L 4–6	0–1	Osborne Stadium	6,200
WIFU Finals Game 2	Sat, Nov 8	vs. Winnipeg Blue Bombers	W 15–3	1–1	Mewata Stadium	3,500
WIFU Finals Game 3	Sat, Nov 15	at Winnipeg Blue Bombers	L 3–10	1–2	Osborne Stadium	6,000

- Winnipeg won the total-point series by 29–22. Winnipeg advances to the Grey Cup game.
