= 1946 Montreal Alouettes season =

Canadian football team season

- Head coach: Lew Hayman
- Home stadium: Delorimier Stadium

Results
- Record: 7–3–2
- Division place: 1st, IRFU
- Playoffs: Lost IRFU Finals

Uniform

The 1946 Montreal Alouettes was the inaugural season of the team. They finished first in the Interprovincial Rugby Football Union with a 7–3–2 record. They lost in the IRFU Finals to the Toronto Argonauts.

== Preseason ==
Game	Date	Opponent	Results		Venue	Attendance
Game	Date	Opponent	Score	Record	Venue	Attendance
1	Aug 30	Winnipeg Blue Bombers	L 6–17	0–1	Osborne Stadium	6,000
2	Sept 2	Winnipeg Blue Bombers	W 24–0	1–1	Osborne Stadium	6,000

== Regular season ==
=== Standings ===
Interprovincial Rugby Football Union
Team	GP	W	L	T	PF	PA	Pts
Montreal Alouettes	12	7	3	2	211	118	16
Toronto Argonauts	12	7	3	2	140	124	16
Ottawa Rough Riders	12	6	4	2	175	128	14
Hamilton Tigers	12	0	10	2	78	234	2

=== Schedule ===
Week	Game	Date	Opponent	Results		Venue	Attendance
Week	Game	Date	Opponent	Score	Record	Venue	Attendance
1	1	Sept 7	Toronto Argonauts	T 10–10	0–0–1	Oakwood Stadium	9,000
2	2	Sept 14	at Ottawa Rough Riders	L 0–4	0–1–1	Lansdowne Park	10,000
3	3	Sept 21	at Hamilton Tigers	W 24–1	1–1–1	Civic Stadium	5,500
4	4	Sept 29	vs. Hamilton Tigers	W 12–6	2–1–1	Delorimier Stadium	13,522
5	5	Oct 5	at Ottawa Rough Riders	L 14–24	2–2–1	Lansdowne Park	10,000
5	6	Oct 6	vs. Ottawa Rough Riders	T 23–23	2–2–2	Delorimier Stadium	12,500
6	7	Oct 12	vs. Toronto Argonauts	W 28–6	3–2–2	Delorimier Stadium	8,000
7	8	Oct 18	at Hamilton Tigers	W 19–0	4–2–2	Civic Stadium	3,000
7	9	Oct 20	vs. Ottawa Rough Riders	W 25–15	5–2–2	Delorimier Stadium	17,308
8	10	Oct 27	vs. Hamilton Tigers	W 21–16	6–2–2	Delorimier Stadium	13,500
9	11	Nov 2	vs. Toronto Argonauts	L 8–9	6–3–2	Delorimier Stadium	12,200
10	12	Nov 7	at Toronto Argonauts	W 18–4	7–3–2	Varsity Stadium	19,500

== Postseason ==
Round	Date	Opponent	Results		Venue	Attendance
Round	Date	Opponent	Score	Record	Venue	Attendance
I.R.F.U. Final	Nov 16	Toronto Argonauts	L 6–12	0–1	Delorimier Stadium	21,800

== Awards and honours ==
None
