= Paul Rowe (Canadian football) =

Canadian gridiron football player (1917–1990)

Profile
- Position: Running back

Personal information
- Born: January 25, 1917; Victoria, British Columbia, Canada
- Died: August 28, 1990 (aged 73); Calgary, Alberta, Canada

Career information
- College: University of Oregon

Career history
- 1938–1940: Calgary Bronks
- 1945–1950: Calgary Stampeders

Awards and highlights
- Grey Cup champion (1948); Dave Dryburgh Memorial Trophy (1948); 5× CFL West All-Star (1939, 1940, 1946, 1947, 1948)
- Canadian Football Hall of Fame (Class of 1964)

Paul "Pappy" Rowe (January 25, 1917 – August 28, 1990) was a Canadian professional football fullback.

Born in Victoria, British Columbia, he played for the Calgary Bronks (1938–1940) and Calgary Stampeders (1945–1950). He was captain of the team when Calgary won the Grey Cup in 1948 and played in the finals in 1949. In 1948, he was awarded the Dave Dryburgh Memorial Trophy.

He is a member of the Canadian Football Hall of Fame, BC Sports Hall of Fame, Alberta Sports Hall of Fame, Canada's Sports Hall of Fame, and Greater Victoria Sports Hall of Fame.
