= 1951 Calgary Stampeders season =

Canadian football team season

- Head coach: Unknown
- Home stadium: Mewata Stadium

Results
- Record: 4–10
- Division place: 4th
- Playoffs: did not qualify

The 1951 Calgary Stampeders finished in fourth place in the W.I.F.U. with a 4–10 record and failed to qualify for the playoffs.

== Regular season ==
=== Season standings ===
Western Interprovincial Football Union
Team	GP	W	L	T	PF	PA	Pts
Saskatchewan Roughriders	14	8	6	0	277	219	16
Edmonton Eskimos	14	8	6	0	306	262	16
Winnipeg Blue Bombers	14	8	6	0	303	311	16
Calgary Stampeders	14	4	10	0	205	299	8

=== Season schedule ===
Game	Date	Opponent	Results		Venue	Attendance
Game	Date	Opponent	Score	Record	Venue	Attendance
1	Sat, Aug 25	at Saskatchewan Roughriders	L 1–8	0–1	Taylor Field	9,000
2	Mon, Aug 27	at Winnipeg Blue Bombers	L 24–34	0–2	Osborne Stadium	9,600
3	Sat, Sept 1	vs. Edmonton Eskimos	L 17–18	0–3	Mewata Stadium	8,000
4	Mon, Sept 3	at Edmonton Eskimos	L 0–5	0–4	Clarke Stadium	12,000
5	Sat, Sept 8	vs. Saskatchewan Roughriders	W 9–7	1–4	Mewata Stadium	8,000
6	Mon, Sept 10	vs. Winnipeg Blue Bombers	W 18–12	2–4	Mewata Stadium	9,000
7	Sat, Sept 15	vs. Edmonton Eskimos	L 15–30	2–5	Mewata Stadium	10,000
8	Sat, Sept 22	at Edmonton Eskimos	L 11–30	2–6	Clarke Stadium	10,000
9	Sat, Sept 29	vs. Winnipeg Blue Bombers	L 18–33	2–7	Mewata Stadium	8,000
10	Mon, Oct 1	vs. Saskatchewan Roughriders	L 12–22	2–8	Mewata Stadium	6,500
11	Sat, Oct 6	at Winnipeg Blue Bombers	W 18–16	3–8	Osborne Stadium	9,500
12	Mon, Oct 8	vs. Saskatchewan Roughriders	L 18–28	3–9	Taylor Field	10,000
13	Sat, Oct 13	at Edmonton Eskimos	L 18–31	3–10	Clarke Stadium	10,000
14	Sat, Oct 20	vs. Edmonton Eskimos	W 26–25	4–10	Mewata Stadium	4,000
