= Norm Carter =

Profile
- Position: Guard

Personal information
- Born: January 1, 1928; Alberta, Canada
- Died: October 16, 1953 (aged 25); Calgary, Alberta, Canada
- Listed height: 5 ft 11 in (1.80 m)
- Listed weight: 194 lb (88 kg)

Career history
- 1948–1951: Calgary Stampeders

Awards and highlights
- Grey Cup champion (1948)

Herbert Norman Carter (January 1, 1928 – October 16, 1953) was a Canadian professional football player who played for the Calgary Stampeders. He won the Grey Cup with them in 1948. Playing his junior football in Calgary, Carter was a blacksmith's apprentice. He died in a hunting accident in Calgary in 1953 at the age of 25.
