= Harry Langford =

Canadian football player (1929–2022)

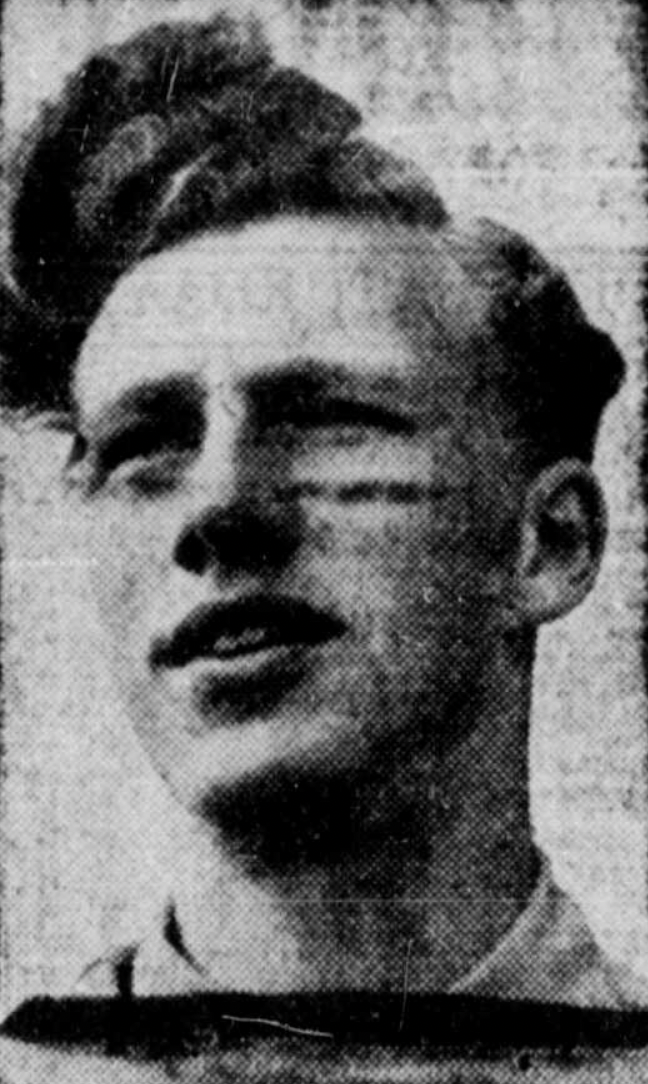
- Langford c. 1946

Profile
- Positions: Guard, Tackle

Personal information
- Born: December 6, 1929; Winnipeg, Manitoba, Canada
- Died: September 19, 2022 (aged 92); Nanaimo, British Columbia, Canada
- Listed height: 6 ft 2 in (1.88 m)
- Listed weight: 235 lb (107 kg)

Career history
- 1950–1958: Calgary Stampeders

Awards and highlights
- 5× CFL West All-Star (1952, 1955–1958)

Other information

Harry Langford (December 6, 1929 – September 19, 2022) was a Canadian professional football lineman who played for the Calgary Stampeders. He was noted for playing 135 consecutive games for the franchise from 1950 to 1958.

== Early life ==
Langford was born in Winnipeg, Manitoba, on December 6, 1929. He completed his primary education at Cecil Rhodes School in Weston, before attending the Daniel McIntyre Collegiate Institute. There, he played for the Daniel McIntyre Maroons from 1945 to 1946 and was selected to both the defensive and offensive all-star teams. He then became an assistant to the Maroons' head coach for three years, while simultaneously playing junior football for the Weston Wildcats. He was named a two-way all-star in all three seasons, was honoured as the league's most valuable player in 1949, and eventually became captain. From his high school years onward, he missed only one game when he fainted after being elbowed in the forehead and receiving a concussion. Although he was hospitalized, he still turned up for practice the following day.

== Career ==
Langford made his debut for the Calgary Stampeders during the 1950 season. The franchise did not qualify for the playoffs during his first two seasons. He played mainly as a guard, though his versatility meant that he could play several positions at both offence and defence. He received All-Star selections in 1952 and from 1955 to 1958, and was appointed captain for the 1958 Shrine Game. He went on to play 135 consecutive regular-season games during his nine seasons with the Stampeders. When including pre-season and playoff games, this totalled to 158 consecutive games, which established a new record at the time. In order to supplement his meagre income from football, Langford worked as a print lithographer and owned a gas station.

== Personal life ==
Langford was married to Muriel until her death in November 2012. They first met when he was 13 years old.

After retiring from professional football, Langford stayed in Calgary for several years and was appointed coach of the Calgary Colts in 1965. He was also a player-coach with the intermediate Drumheller Miners for three seasons. He later relocated to Nanaimo, where he resided until his death. He was honoured by the Stampeders on their Wall of Fame in 1992, before being inducted into the Manitoba Sports Hall of Fame and Museum two decades later in November 2012. Langford died on the morning of September 19, 2022, at age 92.
