= 1949 Calgary Stampeders season =

Canadian football team season

- Head coach: Les Lear
- Home stadium: Mewata Stadium

Results
- Record: 13–1
- Division place: 1st
- Playoffs: Lost Grey Cup

The 1949 Calgary Stampeders finished in first place in the W.I.F.U. with a 13–1 record. They appeared in the Grey Cup and attempted to repeat as champions but they lost to the Montreal Alouettes. On October 22, 1949, the Stampeders recorded their first loss in almost two years (last loss was October 27, 1947) against the Saskatchewan Roughriders. They established a CFL record for the most consecutive regular season wins with a 22-game winning streak from August 25, 1948, to October 22, 1949.

== Regular season ==
=== Season standings ===
Western Interprovincial Football Union
| Team | GP | W | L | T | PF | PA | Pts |
|---|---|---|---|---|---|---|---|
| Calgary Stampeders | 14 | 13 | 1 | 0 | 270 | 77 | 26 |
| Saskatchewan Roughriders | 14 | 9 | 5 | 0 | 235 | 102 | 18 |
| Edmonton Eskimos | 14 | 4 | 10 | 0 | 93 | 235 | 8 |
| Winnipeg Blue Bombers | 14 | 2 | 12 | 0 | 74 | 258 | 4 |

=== Season schedule ===
| Game | Date | Opponent | Result | Record |
|---|---|---|---|---|
| 1 | Sept 5 | at Edmonton Eskimos | W 20–6 | 1–0 |
| 2 | Sept 10 | vs. Saskatchewan Roughriders | W 22–19 | 2–0 |
| 3 | Sept 12 | vs. Winnipeg Blue Bombers | W 32–7 | 3–0 |
| 4 | Sept 17 | at Winnipeg Blue Bombers | W 20–1 | 4–0 |
| 5 | Sept 19 | at Saskatchewan Roughriders | W 13–1 | 5–0 |
| 6 | Sept 24 | vs. Edmonton Eskimos | W 41–5 | 6–0 |
| 7 | Oct 1 | at Edmonton Eskimos | W 12–8 | 7–0 |
| 8 | Oct 8 | at Saskatchewan Roughriders | W 10–3 | 8–0 |
| 9 | Oct 10 | at Winnipeg Blue Bombers | W 3–0 | 9–0 |
| 10 | Oct 15 | vs. Edmonton Eskimos | W 31–6 | 10–0 |
| 11 | Oct 22 | vs. Saskatchewan Roughriders | L 6–9 | 10–1 |
| 12 | Oct 24 | vs. Winnipeg Blue Bombers | W 22–11 | 11–1 |
| 13 | Oct 29 | vs. Edmonton Eskimos | W 27–0 | 12–1 |
| 14 | Oct 31 | at Edmonton Eskimos | W 11–1 | 13–1 |

== Playoffs ==
=== Finals ===
WIFU Finals – Game 1
Calgary Stampeders @ Saskatchewan Roughriders
| Date | Away | Home |
|---|---|---|
| November 5 | Calgary Stampeders 18 | Saskatchewan Roughriders 12 |

WIFU Finals – Game 2
Saskatchewan Roughriders @ Calgary Stampeders
| Date | Away | Home |
|---|---|---|
| November 11 | Saskatchewan Roughriders 9 | Calgary Stampeders 4 |

- Calgary won the total-point series by 22–21. The Stampeders will advance to the Grey Cup game.

=== Grey Cup ===
November 26 37th Annual Grey Cup Game: Varsity Stadium – Toronto, Ontario
| WIFU Champion | IRFU Champion |
|---|---|
| Calgary Stampeders 15 | Montreal Alouettes 28 |
The Montreal Alouettes are the 1949 Grey Cup Champions
