= 1950 Winnipeg Blue Bombers season =

Canadian football team season

- Head coach: Frank Larson
- Home stadium: Osborne Stadium

Results
- Record: 10–4
- Division place: 1st, WIPU
- Playoffs: Lost Grey Cup

The 1950 Winnipeg Blue Bombers was the 18th season of the franchise.

== Regular season ==
Western Interprovincial Football Union
Team	GP	W	L	T	PF	PA	Pts
Winnipeg Blue Bombers	14	10	4	0	221	156	20
Saskatchewan Roughriders	14	7	7	0	207	177	14
Edmonton Eskimos	14	7	7	0	201	197	14
Calgary Stampeders	14	4	10	0	152	251	8

== Playoffs ==
=== Finals ===
WIFU Finals – Game 1
Winnipeg Blue Bombers @ Edmonton Eskimos
Date	Away	Home
November 4	Winnipeg Blue Bombers 16	Edmonton Eskimos 17

WIFU Finals – Game 2
Edmonton Eskimos @ Winnipeg Blue Bombers
Date	Away	Home
November 11	Edmonton Eskimos 12	Winnipeg Blue Bombers 22

WIFU Finals – Game 3
Edmonton Eskimos @ Winnipeg Blue Bombers
Date	Away	Home
November 13	Edmonton Eskimos 6	Winnipeg Blue Bombers 29

- Winnipeg won the total-point series by 67–35. The Blue Bombers advance to the Grey Cup game.

=== Grey Cup ===
Team	Q1	Q2	Q3	Q4	Total
Winnipeg Blue Bombers	0	0	0	0	0
Toronto Argonauts	1	6	6	0	13
