= 1950 Calgary Stampeders season =

Canadian football team season

- Head coach: Les Lear
- Home stadium: Mewata Stadium

Results
- Record: 4–10
- Division place: 4th
- Playoffs: did not qualify

The 1950 Calgary Stampeders finished in fourth place in the W.I.F.U. with a 4–10 record and failed to qualify for the playoffs.

== Regular season ==
=== Season standings ===
Western Interprovincial Football Union
| Team | GP | W | L | T | PF | PA | Pts |
|---|---|---|---|---|---|---|---|
| Winnipeg Blue Bombers | 14 | 10 | 4 | 0 | 221 | 156 | 20 |
| Saskatchewan Roughriders | 14 | 7 | 7 | 0 | 207 | 177 | 14 |
| Edmonton Eskimos | 14 | 7 | 7 | 0 | 201 | 197 | 14 |
| Calgary Stampeders | 14 | 4 | 10 | 0 | 152 | 251 | 8 |

=== Season schedule ===
| Week | Game | Date | Opponent | Results | | Venue | Attendance | Source |
| Week | Game | Date | Opponent | Score | Record | Venue | Attendance | Source |
|---|---|---|---|---|---|---|---|---|
| | 1 | Sat, Aug 26 | at Saskatchewan Roughriders | L 12–25 | 0–1 | Taylor Field | 8,000 | |
| | 2 | Mon, Aug 28 | at Winnipeg Blue Bombers | L 4–7 | 0–2 | Osborne Stadium | 7,700 | |
| | 3 | Sat, Sept 2 | vs. Edmonton Eskimos | L 13–19 | 0–3 | Mewata Stadium | 8,500 | |
| | 4 | Mon, Sept 4 | at Edmonton Eskimos | L 8–18 | 0–4 | Clarke Stadium | 10,000 | |
| | 5 | Sat, Sept 9 | vs. Saskatchewan Roughriders | L 11–16 | 0–5 | Mewata Stadium | 9,500 | |
| | 6 | Mon, Sept 11 | vs. Winnipeg Blue Bombers | W 13–6 | 1–5 | Mewata Stadium | 8,000 | |
| | 7 | Sat, Sept 16 | vs. Edmonton Eskimos | L 22–29 | 1–6 | Mewata Stadium | 8,500 | |
| | 8 | Sat, Sept 23 | at Edmonton Eskimos | L 8–33 | 1–7 | Clarke Stadium | 10,000 | |
| | 9 | Sat, Sept 30 | vs. Winnipeg Blue Bombers | L 0–22 | 1–8 | Mewata Stadium | 6,500 | |
| | 10 | Mon, Oct 2 | vs. Saskatchewan Roughriders | W 16–13 | 2–8 | Mewata Stadium | 7,000 | |
| | 11 | Sat, Oct 7 | at Winnipeg Blue Bombers | L 13–25 | 2–9 | Osborne Stadium | 8,000 | |
| | 12 | Mon, Oct 9 | at Saskatchewan Roughriders | L 0–21 | 2–10 | Taylor Field | 8,000 | |
| | 13 | Sat, Oct 14 | at Edmonton Eskimos | W 19–12 | 3–10 | Clarke Stadium | 7,500 | |
| | 14 | Sat, Oct 21 | vs. Edmonton Eskimos | W 13–7 | 4–10 | Mewata Stadium | 2,000 | |
