= 1946 Calgary Stampeders season =

Canadian football team season

- Head coach: Unknown
- Home stadium: Mewata Stadium

Results
- Record: 5–3
- Division place: 1st, W.I.F.U.
- Playoffs: Lost W.I.F.U. Finals

The 1946 Calgary Stampeders finished in first place in the W.I.F.U. with a 5–3 record. They were defeated in the W.I.F.U. Finals by the Winnipeg Blue Bombers.

== Regular season ==
=== Season standings ===
Western Interprovincial Football Union
Team	GP	W	L	T	PF	PA	Pts
Calgary Stampeders	8	5	3	0	60	37	10
Winnipeg Blue Bombers	8	5	3	0	69	46	10
Regina Roughriders	8	2	6	0	46	92	4

=== Season schedule ===
Week	Game	Date	Opponent	Results		Venue	Attendance
Week	Game	Date	Opponent	Score	Record	Venue	Attendance
1	1	Sat, Aug 31	vs. Regina Roughriders	W 9–0	1–0	Mewata Stadium	4,500
2	2	Sat, Sept 7	at Regina Roughriders	W 6–0	2–0	Taylor Field	3,500
2	3	Mon, Sept 9	at Winnipeg Blue Bombers	W 3–1	3–0	Osborne Stadium	5,000
3	4	Mon, Sept 16	vs. Winnipeg Blue Bombers	L 5–13	3–1	Mewata Stadium	5,000
4	5	Sat, Sept 21	vs. Regina Roughriders	W 19–7	4–1	Mewata Stadium	
5	6	Sat, Oct 5	at Regina Roughriders	L 9–10	4–2	Taylor Field	2,000
5	7	Mon, Oct 7	at Winnipeg Blue Bombers	L 3–6	4–3	Osborne Stadium	3,000
6	8	Sat, Oct 12	vs. Winnipeg Blue Bombers	W 6–0	5–3	Mewata Stadium	3,000

== Playoffs ==
=== Finals ===
WIFU Finals – Game 1
Winnipeg Blue Bombers @ Calgary Stampeders
Date	Away	Home
October 26	Winnipeg Blue Bombers 18	Calgary Stampeders 21

WIFU Finals – Game 2
Calgary Stampeders @ Winnipeg Blue Bombers
Date	Away	Home
November 2	Calgary Stampeders 0	Winnipeg Blue Bombers 12

- Winnipeg won the total-point series by 30–21. Winnipeg advances to the Grey Cup game.
