= 1959 BC Lions season =

Canadian football team season

- General manager: Herb Capozzi
- Head coach: Wayne Robinson
- Home stadium: Empire Stadium

Results
- Record: 9–7
- Division place: 3rd, West
- Playoffs: Lost Western Semi-Final

The BC Lions finished the 1959 CFL season in third place in the W.I.F.U. with a 9–7 record and made the playoffs for the first time in franchise history. After hiring new coach Wayne Robinson and signing University of Iowa stars Randy Duncan (#1 overall pick in the NFL draft) and Willie Fleming, the Lions were a much different team compared to the one a year before.

The battle for a playoff spot came down to the last game of the season against the Calgary Stampeders, with both clubs holding 8–7 records, the loser would be out of the playoffs. The Lions won the game 10–8 and secured the first playoff spot in franchise history as well as the first home playoff game (the first in a two-game series). The Lions season would come to an end in the combined 61–15 West semi-finals loss to Edmonton, but the foundation had been laid for future success.

The Lions changed their uniforms to a primarily Black scheme for the first time and introduced a "1930s-style" winged football helmet design.

== Regular season ==
=== Season standings ===
Western Interprovincial Football Union
Team	GP	W	L	T	PF	PA	Pts
Winnipeg Blue Bombers	16	12	4	0	418	272	24
Edmonton Eskimos	16	10	6	0	370	221	20
BC Lions	16	9	7	0	306	301	18
Calgary Stampeders	16	8	8	0	356	301	16
Saskatchewan Roughriders	16	1	15	0	212	567	2

=== Season schedule ===
Game	Date	Opponent	Results	
Game	Date	Opponent	Score	Record
1	Aug 13	vs. Winnipeg Blue Bombers	L 20–42	0–1
2	Aug 17	at Edmonton Eskimos	W 12–0	1–1
3	Aug 20	vs. Saskatchewan Roughriders	W 36–21	2–1
4	Aug 24	at Calgary Stampeders	L 17–29	2–2
5	Aug 31	vs. Edmonton Eskimos	W 8–7	3–2
6	Sept 3	at Winnipeg Blue Bombers	L 23–34	3–3
7	Sept 7	at Saskatchewan Roughriders	W 35–17	4–3
8	Sept 14	vs. Calgary Stampeders	W 14–8	5–3
9	Sept 19	vs. Winnipeg Blue Bombers	W 17–6	6–3
10	Sept 21	at Edmonton Eskimos	L 7–29	6–4
11	Sept 26	at Calgary Stampeders	W 28–10	7–4
12	Oct 5	vs. Saskatchewan Roughriders	L 14–15	7–5
13	Oct 10	vs. Edmonton Eskimos	L 14–38	7–6
14	Oct 17	at Winnipeg Blue Bombers	L 6–31	7–7
15	Oct 19	at Saskatchewan Roughriders	W 45–6	8–7
16	Oct 24	vs. Calgary Stampeders	W 10–8	9–7

== Playoffs ==
=== Semi-finals ===
Western semi-finals – Game 1
Edmonton Eskimos @ BC Lions
Date	Away	Home
Oct 31	Edmonton Eskimos 20	BC Lions 8

Western semi-finals – Game 2
BC Lions @ Edmonton Eskimos
Date	Away	Home
November 4	BC Lions 7	Edmonton Eskimos 41

- Edmonton won the total-point series by 61–15. The Eskimos will play the Winnipeg Blue Bombers in the Western Finals.

=== Offensive leaders ===
Player	Passing yds	Rushing yds	Receiving yds	TD
Randy Duncan	2746	123	0	0
Willie Fleming		774	517	7
Ed Vereb		648	544	4
Don Vicic		802	83	6
Jerry Janes		0	936	6
Bruce Claridge		0	519	4

== 1959 CFL awards ==
None
