= 1947 Toronto Argonauts season =

CFL team season

- Head coach: Teddy Morris
- Home stadium: Varsity Stadium

Results
- Record: 7–4–1
- Division place: 2nd, IRFU
- Playoffs: Won Grey Cup

The 1947 Toronto Argonauts season was the 58th season for the team since the franchise's inception in 1873. The team finished in second place in the Interprovincial Rugby Football Union with a 7–4–1 record and qualified for the playoffs for the ninth consecutive season. The Argonauts defeated the Ottawa Rough Riders in a two-game total-points IRFU Final series before winning the Eastern Final over the Ottawa Trojans. The two-time defending Grey Cup champion Argonauts faced the Winnipeg Blue Bombers for the third time in a row in the Grey Cup game. Toronto won their eighth Grey Cup championship by a score of 10–9 for the first three-peat in franchise history.

== Preseason ==
Game	Date	Opponent	Results		Venue	Attendance
Game	Date	Opponent	Score	Record	Venue	Attendance
B	Sat, Aug 30	at Winnipeg Blue Bombers	W 16–9	1–0	Osborne Stadium	5,900
B	Mon, Sept 1	at Winnipeg Blue Bombers	W 11–0	2–0	Osborne Stadium	4,600

== Regular season ==
=== Standings ===
Interprovincial Rugby Football Union
Team	GP	W	L	T	PF	PA	Pts
Ottawa Rough Riders	12	8	4	0	170	103	16
Toronto Argonauts	12	7	4	1	140	122	15
Montreal Alouettes	12	6	6	0	164	164	12
Hamilton Tigers	12	2	9	1	119	204	5

=== Schedule ===
Week	Game	Date	Opponent	Results		Venue	Attendance
Week	Game	Date	Opponent	Score	Record	Venue	Attendance
1	1	Sat, Sept 6	at Ottawa Rough Riders	L 6–23	0–1	Lansdowne Park	12,000
2	2	Sat, Sept 13	vs. Montreal Alouettes	L 7–15	0–2	Varsity Stadium	14,000
3	3	Wed, Sept 17	at Hamilton Tigers	W 34–25	1–2	Civic Stadium	12,000
3	4	Sat, Sept 20	vs. Hamilton Tigers	W 2–0	2–2	Varsity Stadium	13,000
4	5	Sat, Sept 27	vs. Ottawa Rough Riders	W 8–0	3–2	Varsity Stadium	19,000
5	6	Sat, Oct 4	at Montreal Alouettes	W 10–6	4–2	Delorimier Stadium	13,400
6	7	Sat, Oct 11	at Hamilton Tigers	W 13–1	5–2	Civic Stadium	8,500
6	8	Mon, Oct 13	vs. Hamilton Tigers	T 6–6	5–2–1	Varsity Stadium	15,000
7	9	Sat, Oct 18	vs. Montreal Alouettes	W 25–3	6–2–1	Varsity Stadium	16,000
8	10	Sat, Oct 25	at Montreal Alouettes	L 12–17	6–3–1	Delorimier Stadium	8,600
9	11	Sat, Nov 1	vs. Ottawa Rough Riders	L 5–15	6–4–1	Varsity Stadium	16,000
10	12	Sat, Nov 8	at Ottawa Rough Riders	W 12–11	7–4–1	Lansdowne Park	8,500

== Postseason ==
Round	Date	Opponent	Results		Venue	Attendance
Round	Date	Opponent	Score	Record	Venue	Attendance
IRFU Final Game 1	Tue, Nov 11	at Ottawa Rough Riders	W 3–0	1–0	Lansdowne Park	10,000
IRFU Final Game 2	Sat, Nov 15	vs. Ottawa Rough Riders	W 21–0	2–0	Varsity Stadium	19,500
Eastern Final	Sat, Nov 22	vs. Ottawa Trojans	W 22–1	3–0	Varsity Stadium	16,000
Grey Cup	Sat, Nov 29	vs. Winnipeg Blue Bombers	W 10–9	4–0	Varsity Stadium	18,885

=== Grey Cup ===
November 29 @ Varsity Stadium (Attendance: 18,885)

Team	Q1	Q2	Q3	Q4	Total
Winnipeg Blue Bombers	6	3	0	0	9
Toronto Argonauts	0	1	6	3	10
