= 1945 Winnipeg Blue Bombers season =

Canadian football team season

- General manager: Lou Adelman
- Home stadium: Osborne Stadium

Results
- Record: No league play
- Playoffs: Lost Grey Cup

The 1945 Winnipeg Blue Bombers was the 13th season of the franchise and the first since 1941, as the Interprovincial Rugby Football Union and the Western Interprovincial Football Union each returned to play with the end of World War II.

== Regular season ==
No league play occurred.

== Playoffs ==
WIFU Finals
Winnipeg Blue Bombers @ Calgary Stampeders
Date	Away	Home
November 10	Winnipeg Blue Bombers 9	Calgary Stampeders 6

- Winnipeg advances to the Grey Cup game.

=== Grey Cup ===
Team	Q1	Q2	Q3	Q4	Total
Winnipeg Blue Bombers	0	0	0	0	0
Toronto Argonauts	12	0	12	11	35
