= 1946 Toronto Argonauts season =

CFL team season

- Head coach: Teddy Morris
- Home stadium: Varsity Stadium

Results
- Record: 7–3–2
- Division place: 2nd, IRFU
- Playoffs: Won Grey Cup

The 1946 Toronto Argonauts season was the 57th season for the team since the franchise's inception in 1873. The team finished in second place in the Interprovincial Rugby Football Union with a 7–3–2 record and qualified for the playoffs for the eighth consecutive season. The Argonauts defeated the Montreal Alouettes in the IRFU Final before winning the Eastern Final over the Toronto Balmy Beach Beachers. The defending Grey Cup champion Argonauts faced the Winnipeg Blue Bombers in a rematch of the 33rd Grey Cup game. Toronto prevailed as they won their seventh Grey Cup championship by a score of 28–6.

== Preseason ==
Game	Date	Opponent	Results		Venue	Attendance
Game	Date	Opponent	Score	Record	Venue	Attendance
A	Sat, Aug 31	vs. Toronto Balmy Beach Beachers	W 17–7	1–0	Oakwood Stadium	5,000

== Regular season ==
=== Standings ===
Interprovincial Rugby Football Union
Team	GP	W	L	T	PF	PA	Pts
Montreal Alouettes	12	7	3	2	211	118	16
Toronto Argonauts	12	7	3	2	140	124	16
Ottawa Rough Riders	12	6	4	2	175	128	14
Hamilton Tigers	12	0	10	2	78	234	2

=== Schedule ===
Week	Game	Date	Opponent	Results		Venue	Attendance
Week	Game	Date	Opponent	Score	Record	Venue	Attendance
1	1	Sat, Sept 7	vs. Montreal Alouettes	T 10–10	0–0–1	Oakwood Stadium	9,000
2	2	Sat, Sept 14	vs. Hamilton Tigers	W 31–8	1–0–1	Oakwood Stadium	7,600
3	3	Sat, Sept 21	vs. Ottawa Rough Riders	W 13–12	2–0–1	Oakwood Stadium	8,500
4	4	Wed Sept 25	at Hamilton Tigers	T 15–15	2–0–2	Civic Stadium	6,200
4	5	Sat, Sept 28	at Ottawa Rough Riders	W 12–6	3–0–2	Lansdowne Park	12,000
5	6	Sat, Oct 5	vs. Hamilton Tigers	W 22–0	4–0–2	Varsity Stadium	15,000
6	7	Sat, Oct 12	at Montreal Alouettes	L 6–28	4–1–2	Delorimier Stadium	8,000
6	8	Mon, Oct 14	at Hamilton Tigers	W 7–2	5–1–2	Civic Stadium	7,000
7	9	Sat, Oct 19	vs. Ottawa Rough Riders	L 3–12	5–2–2	Varsity Stadium	17,000
8	10	Sat, Oct 26	at Ottawa Rough Riders	W 8–5	6–2–2	Lansdowne Park	12,000
9	11	Sat, Nov 2	at Montreal Alouettes	W 9–8	7–2–2	Delorimier Stadium	12,220
10	12	Sat, Nov 9	vs. Montreal Alouettes	L 4–18	7–3–2	Varsity Stadium	19,500

== Postseason ==
Round	Date	Opponent	Results		Venue	Attendance
Round	Date	Opponent	Score	Record	Venue	Attendance
IRFU Final	Sat, Nov 16	at Montreal Alouettes	W 12–6	1–0	Delorimier Stadium	21,800
Eastern Final	Sat, Nov 23	vs. Toronto Balmy Beach Beachers	W 22–12	2–0	Varsity Stadium	19,960
Grey Cup	Sat, Nov 30	Winnipeg Blue Bombers	W 28–6	3–0	Varsity Stadium	18,960

=== Grey Cup ===
November 30 @ Varsity Stadium (Attendance: 18,960)

Team	Q1	Q2	Q3	Q4	Total
Winnipeg Blue Bombers	0	0	0	6	6
Toronto Argonauts	0	16	6	6	28
