= Tom Brook (businessman) =

Thomas Lloyd Brook (January 27, 1908 – August 2, 1981) was an American-born Canadian businessman who was president of Asamera Oil Corporation and the Calgary Stampeders.

== Early life ==
Brook was born on January 27, 1908 in Pelham, New York to John Thomas and Fanny (Dean) Brook. He graduated from Amherst College and began working for an investment business on Wall Street in 1927. In 1936, he moved to Toronto.

== Asamera Oil ==
In 1941, Brook became associated with the New British Dominion Oil Company of Calgary. He bought into the company and refinanced and reorganized it. He became president of New British Dominion Oil in 1943. The company acquired a number of gas wells the Peace River Country, oil and gas wells in Central Alberta, gas wells in southeastern Alberta, and oil wells in the United States. By 1955, New British Dominion had 175 billion cubic feet of gas reserves.

In 1956, Brook was elected president of Northwest Nitro-Chemicals, a joint venture between New British Dominion and Commercial Solvents Corporation that constructed and operated a chemical plant in Medicine Hat that sold some of New British Dominion's gas as fertilizer. He resigned the following year to resume full-time duties at New British Dominion.

In 1957, New British Dominion entered a deal with Sea Oil and General Corp., a subsidiary of Baud Corp. N.V., to work on oil exploration in Indonesia. As a part of the deal, New British Dominion was renamed Asamera Oil Co. and Baud was given shares in the company in exchange for its oil rights in Indonesia. In 1961, Asamera became the first foreign company to secure a production sharing contract in Indonesia since that country's independence.

== Calgary Stampeders ==
In 1948, Brook was elected president of the Calgary Stampeders. He hired Les Lear to coach and personally guaranteed the players’ salaries. The team went undefeated in 1948 and won the 36th Grey Cup. The Stampeders returned to the Grey Cup in 1949, but lost to the Montreal Alouettes. At a 1949 Canadian Rugby Union meeting, Brook successfully lobbied against a proposal by Lew Hayman to turn the Grey Cup into a two game home-and-home series with total points determining a champion. Brook was elected into the Canadian Football Hall of Fame in 1975.

== Later life ==
On May 3, 1977, Brook announced his retirement as chairman and chief executive officer of the Asamera Oil Corporation. Later that month, Asmera disclosed to the United States Securities and Exchange Commission that Brook had a secret bank account in Bermuda which contained over $1 million in company funds. Brook agreed to pay $845,513 in exchange for an Asamera subsidiary and its two partners agreeing not to pursue legal action. In 1978, the Supreme Court of Canada unanimously ruled that Brook owed Baud Corp N.V. $812,500 in damages for failing to return 125,000 Asamera shares that Baud loaned him in 1957. He died on August 2, 1981.
