= 1947 Winnipeg Blue Bombers season =

Canadian football team season

- Head coach: Charles A. West
- Home stadium: Osborne Stadium

Results
- Record: 5–3
- Division place: 1st, WIPU
- Playoffs: Lost Grey Cup

The 1947 Winnipeg Blue Bombers was the 15th season of the franchise.

== Regular season ==
Western Interprovincial Football Union
Team	GP	W	L	T	PF	PA	Pts
Winnipeg Blue Bombers	8	5	3	0	83	83	10
Calgary Stampeders	8	4	4	0	79	93	8
Regina Roughriders	8	3	5	0	78	64	6

== Playoffs ==
=== Finals ===
WIFU Finals – Game 1
Calgary Stampeders @ Winnipeg Blue Bombers
Date	Away	Home
November 1	Calgary Stampeders 4	Winnipeg Blue Bombers 16

WIFU Finals – Game 2
Winnipeg Blue Bombers @ Calgary Stampeders
Date	Away	Home
November 11	Winnipeg Blue Bombers 3	Calgary Stampeders 15

WIFU Finals – Game 3
Calgary Stampeders @ Winnipeg Blue Bombers
Date	Away	Home
November 15	Calgary Stampeders 3	Winnipeg Blue Bombers 10

- Winnipeg won the total-point series by 29–22. Winnipeg advances to the Grey Cup game.

=== Grey Cup ===
Team	Q1	Q2	Q3	Q4	Total
Winnipeg Blue Bombers	6	3	0	0	9
Toronto Argonauts	0	1	6	3	10
