= Stu Laird =

Canadian football player (born 1960)

Profile
- Positions: Defensive tackle, defensive end

Personal information
- Born: July 8, 1960 (age 66); Assiniboia, Saskatchewan, Canada

Career information
- University: Calgary

Career history

Playing
- 1984–1996: Calgary Stampeders

Operations
- 2001–2012: CFLPA President

Awards and highlights
- Grey Cup champion (1992); CFL West All-Star (1994); Tom Pate Memorial Award (1991); 3× Stampeders Presidents Ring Award (1988, 1992, 1995); Calgary Stampeders Wall of Fame (2014)

Stuart Laird (born July 8, 1960) is a Canadian former professional football defensive tackle who played thirteen seasons for the Calgary Stampeders of the Canadian Football League (CFL). He is a graduate of the University of Calgary where he was a five-year starter with the Calgary Dinosaurs from 1978 to 1982, and earned a bachelor of arts degree in Economics.

Laird's playing achievements include 1985 Stampeder special teams player of the year, 1988 and 1991 CFLPA outstanding defensive line, 1992 Grey Cup Champion, 1995 CFL West All-Star and retired with the most QB sacks by a Canadian born player in CFL history (now 3rd). His number 75 jersey was retired in 1996.

Laird ranks 3rd on the Stamps all-time sack list and was inducted onto the Stampeders Wall of Fame in September 2014. Laird was also recognized by the Stampeders in 1988, 1992 and again in 1995 when Stu became the recipient of their prestigious President’s Ring, one of only two players to win the Ring three times.

In 2001, five years after he retired from the CFL, Laird was elected the eighth President of the Canadian Football League Players' Association, serving until 2012.

In 2005, Laird was a recipient of the Alberta Centennial Medal. The medal celebrates Alberta's first 100 years by paying tribute to Albertans whose achievements have benefited their fellow citizens, their community and their province.

On July 3, 2020, Laird was selected to the TSN CFL2020 Calgary Stampeder All-Time team.

In 2022, Laird was selected by 3rd Down Nation as the "Greatest CFL player" ever from the University of Calgary.

Laird worked as a full-time firefighter, promoted to the position of Battalion Chief with the Calgary Fire Department before retiring in 2020.
