= 1947 Ottawa Rough Riders season =

Canadian football team season

- Head coach: Sammy Fox
- Home stadium: Lansdowne Park

Results
- Record: 8–4
- Division place: 1st, IRFU
- Playoffs: Lost in IRFU Final

The 1947 Ottawa Rough Riders finished in first place in the Interprovincial Rugby Football Union with an 8–4 record but lost the IRFU Finals to the Toronto Argonauts.

== Preseason ==
Game	Date	Opponent	Results		Venue	Attendance
Game	Date	Opponent	Score	Record	Venue	Attendance
A	Sat, Aug 23	at Toronto Indians	W 13–1	1–0	Oakwood Stadium	3,200
B	Sat, Aug 30	vs. Regina Roughriders	W 54–0	2–0	Lansdowne Park	5,000

== Regular season ==
=== Standings ===
Interprovincial Rugby Football Union
Team	GP	W	L	T	PF	PA	Pts
Ottawa Rough Riders	12	8	4	0	170	103	16
Toronto Argonauts	12	7	4	1	140	122	15
Montreal Alouettes	12	6	6	0	164	164	12
Hamilton Tigers	12	2	9	1	119	204	5

=== Schedule ===
Week	Game	Date	Opponent	Results		Venue	Attendance
Week	Game	Date	Opponent	Score	Record	Venue	Attendance
1	1	Sat, Sept 6	vs. Toronto Argonauts	W 23–6	1–0	Lansdowne Park	12,000
2	2	Sat, Sept 13	at Hamilton Tigers	W 8–2	2–0	Civic Stadium	12,000
3	3	Sat, Sept 20	vs. Montreal Alouettes	W 28–23	3–0	Lansdowne Park	12,000
3	4	Sun, Sept 21	at Montreal Alouettes	W 8–3	4–0	Delorimier Stadium	19,102
4	5	Sat, Sept 27	vs. Toronto Argonauts	L 0–8	4–1	Varsity Stadium	19,000
5	6	Sat, Oct 4	at Hamilton Tigers	W 33–12	5–1	Lansdowne Park	10,000
6	7	Sat, Oct 11	vs. Montreal Alouettes	L 1–7	5–2	Lansdowne Park	9,586
6	8	Sun, Oct 12	at Montreal Alouettes	W 22–3	6–2	Delorimier Stadium	14,000
7	9	Sat, Oct 18	vs. Hamilton Tigers	W 13–8	7–2	Lansdowne Park	9,089
8	10	Sun, Oct 26	at Hamilton Tigers	L 8–14	7–3	Civic Stadium	7,500
9	11	Sat, Nov 1	at Toronto Argonauts	W 15–5	8–3	Varsity Stadium	16,000
10	12	Sat, Nov 8	vs. Toronto Argonauts	L 11–12	8–4	Lansdowne Park	8,500

== Postseason ==
=== Playoffs ===
Round	Date	Opponent	Results		Venue	Attendance
Round	Date	Opponent	Score	Record	Venue	Attendance
IRFU Final #1	Tue, Nov 11	vs. Toronto Argonauts	L 0–3	0–1	Lansdowne Park	10,000
IRFU Final #2	Sat, Nov 15	at Toronto Argonauts	L 0–21	0–2	Varsity Stadium	19,500
