= 1959 Calgary Stampeders season =

Canadian football team season

- General manager: Jim Finks
- Head coach: Otis Douglas
- Home stadium: Mewata Stadium

Results
- Record: 8–8
- Division place: 4th, West
- Playoffs: did not qualify

The 1959 Calgary Stampeders finished in fourth place in the W.I.F.U. with an 8–8 record and failed to make the playoffs.

This was the Stamps last season at Mewata Stadium. They would move into their new home McMahon Stadium a year later.

== Regular season ==
=== Season standings ===
Western Interprovincial Football Union
Team	GP	W	L	T	PF	PA	Pts
Winnipeg Blue Bombers	16	12	4	0	418	272	24
Edmonton Eskimos	16	10	6	0	370	221	20
BC Lions	16	9	7	0	306	301	18
Calgary Stampeders	16	8	8	0	356	301	16
Saskatchewan Roughriders	16	1	15	0	212	567	2

=== Season schedule ===
Game	Date	Opponent	Results		Venue	Attendance
Game	Date	Opponent	Score	Record	Venue	Attendance
1		Saskatchewan Roughriders	W 28–8	1–0		
2		Winnipeg Blue Bombers	L 21–22	1–1		
3		Winnipeg Blue Bombers	W 23–21	2–1		
4		BC Lions	W 29–17	3–1		
5		Saskatchewan Roughriders	W 28–10	4–1		
6		Edmonton Eskimos	L 10–16	4–2		
7		Edmonton Eskimos	L 20–27	4–3		
8		BC Lions	L 8–14	4–4		
9		Winnipeg Blue Bombers	L 10–15	4–5		
10		BC Lions	L 10–28	4–6		
11		Saskatchewan Roughriders	W 18–15	5–6		
12		Winnipeg Blue Bombers	L 24–28	5–7		
13		Saskatchewan Roughriders	W 43–13	6–7		
14		Edmonton Eskimos	W 41–23	7–7		
15		Edmonton Eskimos	W 25–24	8–7		
16		BC Lions	L 8–10	8–8		

== Awards and records ==
- None
