= 1951 Ottawa Rough Riders season =

Canadian football team season

- Head coach: Clem Crowe
- Home stadium: Lansdowne Park

Results
- Record: 7–5
- Division place: 1st, IRFU
- Playoffs: Won Grey Cup

The 1951 Ottawa Rough Riders finished in first place in the Interprovincial Rugby Football Union with a 7–5 record and won the Grey Cup.

== Preseason ==
Game	Date	Opponent	Results		Venue	Attendance
Game	Date	Opponent	Score	Record	Venue	Attendance
A	Sat, Aug 4	vs. Toronto Balmy Beach Beachers	W 61–0	1–0	Lansdowne Park	4,000
B	Sat, Aug 11	vs. New York Giants	L 18–41	1–1	Lansdowne Park	18,000
C	Sat, Aug 18	at Hamilton Tiger-Cats	L 17–38	1–2	Civic Stadium	11,000

== Regular season ==
=== Standings ===
Interprovincial Rugby Football Union
Team	GP	W	L	T	PF	PA	Pts
Ottawa Rough Riders	12	7	5	0	218	197	14
Hamilton Tiger-Cats	12	7	5	0	229	131	14
Toronto Argonauts	12	7	5	0	226	205	14
Montreal Alouettes	12	3	9	0	146	286	6

=== Schedule ===
Week	Game	Date	Opponent	Results		Venue	Attendance
Week	Game	Date	Opponent	Score	Record	Venue	Attendance
1	1	Sat, Sept 1	vs. Toronto Argonauts	L 17–36	0–1	Lansdowne Park	15,000
2	2	Sat, Sept 8	vs. Montreal Alouettes	W 13–9	1–1	Lansdowne Park	14,166
2	3	Sun, Sept 9	at Montreal Alouettes	W 33–8	2–1	Delorimier Stadium	21,812
3	4	Sat, Sept 15	at Hamilton Tiger-Cats	L 6–11	2–2	Civic Stadium	15,000
4	5	Sat, Sept 22	at Toronto Argonauts	L 10–17	2–3	Varsity Stadium	16,250
5	5	Sat, Sept 29	vs. Toronto Argonauts	W 20–18	3–3	Lansdowne Park	18,000
6	7	Sat, Oct 6	vs. Montreal Alouettes	W 25–13	4–3	Lansdowne Park	13,521
6	8	Mon, Oct 8	at Montreal Alouettes	W 12–9	5–3	Delorimier Stadium	15,322
7	9	Sat, Oct 13	vs. Toronto Argonauts	L 19–28	5–4	Lansdowne Park	15,000
8	10	Sat, Oct 20	at Hamilton Tiger-Cats	W 32–16	6–4	Lansdowne Park	14,000
9	11	Sat, Oct 27	vs. Hamilton Tiger-Cats	W 13–9	7–4	Lansdowne Park	14,794
10	12	Sat, Nov 3	at Toronto Argonauts	L 18–23	7–5	Varsity Stadium	21,844

== Postseason ==
=== Playoffs ===
Game	Date	Opponent	Results		Venue	Attendance
Game	Date	Opponent	Score	Record	Venue	Attendance
IRFU Final #1	Wed, Nov 14	vs. Hamilton Tiger-Cats	W 17–7	1–0	Civic Stadium	9,000
IRFU Final #2	Sat, Nov 17	at Hamilton Tiger-Cats	W 11–9	2–0	Lansdowne Park	17,000
Eastern Final	Wed, Nov 21	vs. Sarnia Imperials	W 43–17	3–0	Lansdowne Park	17,000
Grey Cup	Sat, Nov 24	Saskatchewan Roughriders	W 21–14	4–0	Varsity Stadium	27,341

==== Grey Cup ====
Teams	1 Q	2 Q	3 Q	4 Q	Final
Saskatchewan Roughriders	2	0	0	12	14
Ottawa Rough Riders	0	12	7	2	21
