= George Hansen (Canadian football) =

Canadian gridiron football player (1934–2017)

Profile
- Position: Tackle

Personal information
- Born: April 22, 1934; Calgary, Alberta
- Died: July 6, 2017 (aged 83); Calgary, Alberta
- Listed height: 6 ft 2 in (1.88 m)
- Listed weight: 245 lb (111 kg)

Career information
- College: Georgia

Career history
- 1959–1966: Calgary Stampeders

George Ernest Hansen (April 22, 1934 – July 6, 2017) was a Canadian professional football player who played for the Calgary Stampeders. He previously played at the University of Georgia. He was included on the Stampeders' Wall of Fame in 1999.

Hansen died on July 6, 2017, at age 83.
