= Keith Spaith =

American gridiron football player (1923–1976)

Profile
- Positions: Quarterback, Punter

Personal information
- Born: April 8, 1923; Dinuba, California
- Died: March 17, 1977 (aged 53); Dinuba, California

Career information
- College: Saint Mary's; USC

Career history
- 1947: Hawaiian Warriors
- 1948–54: Calgary Stampeders

Awards and highlights
- Grey Cup champion (1948); 2× Jeff Nicklin Memorial Trophy (1948, 1949); 2× CFL All-Star (1948, 49)

Robert Keith Spaith (April 8, 1923 – March 19, 1977) was an American Canadian football player for the Calgary Stampeders from 1948 to 1954.

== Early life ==
Spaith was born in Dinuba, California. He played college football with Saint Mary's College of California and later transferred to University of Southern California.

== Career ==
In 1947, Spaith played one season in the Pacific Coast Professional Football League, with the Hawaiian Warriors. His team finished 7–2 and won the league title, though it was later discovered that players had bet on games. Spaith was one of 14 suspended.

=== Western Interprovincial Football Union ===
Spaith joined the Calgary Stampeders in 1948. In his rookie season he led the Stamps to an undefeated 12–0 record (the last team in Canadian professional football to do so) while being named an All-Star and being named the best player in the Western Division with the Jeff Nicklin Memorial Trophy. In the 36th Grey Cup, he played all 60 minutes and even intercepted a pass. In 1949 the Cowboys went 13–1 and Spaith was awarded All-Star honors again to go along with winning the Nicklin Trophy. In the 37th Grey Cup, they lost to the Montreal Alouettes.

Spaith played five more seasons with Calgary. He completed 555 of 1166 passes for 8906 yards, with 23 touchdown passes and 52 interceptions. He also punted 397 times.

After his football career, he returned to the United States and worked in the construction business.

== Personal life ==
On February 3, 1949, Spaith married Dorothy Elizabeth Roenisch (1924–2010) at Christ Church in Calgary. They had three children: Robert Keith Jr., Douglas Walter (1952–1984), and Dorothy Brent. His oldest son, Robert Jr., is a well-known sculptor in Calgary. Keith and Dorothy later divorced. On August 21, 1971 in Reno, Spaith remarried to Mary Eileen Womack (1913–2010). Spaith died on March 19, 1977 at age 53. In 2002, he was inducted into the Stampeders Alumni Wall of Fame.
