= 1946 Winnipeg Blue Bombers season =

Canadian football team season

- Head coach: Charles A. West
- Home stadium: Osborne Stadium

Results
- Record: 5–3
- Division place: 2nd, WIPU
- Playoffs: Lost Grey Cup

The 1946 Winnipeg Blue Bombers was the 14th season of the franchise.

== Regular season ==
Western Interprovincial Football Union
Team	GP	W	L	T	PF	PA	Pts
Calgary Stampeders	8	5	3	0	60	37	10
Winnipeg Blue Bombers	8	5	3	0	69	46	10
Regina Roughriders	8	2	6	0	46	92	4

== Playoffs ==
WIFU Finals – Game 1
Winnipeg Blue Bombers @ Calgary Stampeders
Date	Away	Home
October 26	Winnipeg Blue Bombers 18	Calgary Stampeders 21

WIFU Finals – Game 2
Calgary Stampeders @ Winnipeg Blue Bombers
Date	Away	Home
November 2	Calgary Stampeders 0	Winnipeg Blue Bombers 12

- The Winnipeg Blue Bombers won the total-point series by 30–21. Winnipeg advances to the Grey Cup game.

=== Grey Cup ===
Team	Q1	Q2	Q3	Q4	Total
Winnipeg Blue Bombers	0	0	0	6	6
Toronto Argonauts	0	16	6	6	28
