= 1946 Ottawa Rough Riders season =

Canadian football team season

- Head coach: George Fraser
- Home stadium: Lansdowne Park

Results
- Record: 6–4–2
- Division place: 3rd, IRFU
- Playoffs: Did not qualify

The 1946 Ottawa Rough Riders finished in third place in the Interprovincial Rugby Football Union with a 6–4–2 record and failed to qualify for the playoffs.

== Preseason ==
Game	Date	Opponent	Results		Venue	Attendance
Game	Date	Opponent	Score	Record	Venue	Attendance
A	Sat, Aug 31	vs. Ottawa Trojans	W 27–10	1–0	Lansdowne Park	5,000

== Regular season ==
=== Standings ===
Interprovincial Rugby Football Union
Team	GP	W	L	T	PF	PA	Pts
Montreal Alouettes	12	7	3	2	211	118	16
Toronto Argonauts	12	7	3	2	140	124	16
Ottawa Rough Riders	12	6	4	2	175	128	14
Hamilton Tigers	12	0	10	2	78	234	2

=== Schedule ===
Week	Game	Date	Opponent	Results		Venue	Attendance
Week	Game	Date	Opponent	Score	Record	Venue	Attendance
1	1	Sat, Sept 7	at Hamilton Tigers	W 34–17	1–0	Civic Stadium	7,000
2	2	Sat, Sept 14	vs. Montreal Alouettes	W 4–0	2–0	Lansdowne Park	10,000
3	3	Sat, Sept 21	at Toronto Argonauts	L 12–13	2–1	Oakwood Stadium	8,500
4	4	Sat, Sept 28	vs. Toronto Argonauts	L 6–12	2–2	Lansdowne Park	12,000
5	5	Sat, Oct 5	vs. Montreal Alouettes	W 24–14	3–2	Lansdowne Park	10,000
5	6	Sun, Oct 6	at Montreal Alouettes	T 23–23	3–2–1	Delorimier Stadium	12,500
6	7	Sat, Oct 12	vs. Hamilton Tigers	T 6–6	3–2–2	Lansdowne Park	4,000
7	8	Sat, Oct 19	at Toronto Argonauts	W 12–3	4–2–2	Varsity Stadium	17,000
7	9	Sun, Oct 20	at Montreal Alouettes	L 15–25	4–3–2	Delorimier Stadium	17,308
8	10	Sat, Oct 26	vs. Toronto Argonauts	L 5–8	4–4–2	Lansdowne Park	12,000
9	11	Sat, Nov 2	at Hamilton Tigers	W 11–1	5–4–2	Civic Stadium	2,000
10	12	Sat, Nov 9	vs. Hamilton Tigers	W 23–6	6–4–2	Lansdowne Park	8,000
