= Tony Anselmo (Canadian football) =

Canadian businessman

- Born: Anthony Garry Anselmo; March 13, 1918; Michel, British Columbia, Canada
- Died: November 10, 2009 (aged 91); Calgary, Alberta, Canada
- Occupations: President and CEO of Canada Safeway
- Spouse: Minerva Anselmo

Anthony Garry Anselmo, CM (March 14, 1918 – November 10, 2009) was a community builder for the Calgary Stampeders Football Club of the Canadian Football League and was involved with the team from 1973 until 2009.

In 1978, he was made a Member of the Order of Canada "in recognition of his numerous services to Calgary". He was inducted into the Canadian Football Hall of Fame as a builder in 2009.
