= Sammy Fox =

American football player and coach (1918–2004)

No. 70
- Position: End

Personal information
- Born: May 4, 1918; Washington D.C., U.S.
- Died: April 11, 2004 (aged 85); Kendall, Florida, U.S.
- Listed height: 6 ft 2 in (1.88 m)
- Listed weight: 215 lb (98 kg)

Career information
- High school: Central (DC)
- College: Ohio State

Career history

Playing
- New York Giants (1945); Jersey City Giants (1946); Paterson Panthers (1946)

Coaching
- Ottawa Rough Riders (1947) Head coach
- Stats at Pro Football Reference

Samuel Simon Fox (May 4, 1918 – April 11, 2004) was an American football end who played one season for the New York Giants. He was the head coach of the Ottawa Rough Riders in 1947.

== Early life ==
Sammy Fox was born on May 4, 1918, in Washington D.C. He went to high school at Central (DC).

== College career ==
He went to college at Ohio State.

== Professional career ==
New York Giants

In 1945, he played for the New York Giants. He played in 8 games and had 10 catches for 120 yards. He also had 2 touchdowns.

Jersey City Giants

In 1946, he played 1 game for the minor league Jersey City Giants.

Paterson Panthers

In the same year, he played 5 games for the Paterson Panthers. He had one touchdown.

== Coaching career ==
Ottawa Rough Riders

In 1947, he coached the Ottawa Rough Riders. They had a 8–4 record.

== Later life ==
He died on April 11, 2004. He was 85 at the time of his death.
