= Pete Karpuk =

Canadian football player

Profile
- Positions: Halfback, End

Personal information
- Born: c. 1927; Toronto, Ontario, Canada
- Died: March 4, 1985 (aged 58); Toronto, Ontario, Canada
- Listed height: 5 ft 11 in (1.80 m)
- Listed weight: 175 lb (79 kg)

Career history
- 1948–1953, 1955: Ottawa Rough Riders
- 1954: Hamilton Tiger-Cats
- 1956–1957: Montreal Alouettes

Awards and highlights
- Grey Cup champion (1951)

Pete Karpuk (c. 1927 – March 4, 1985) was a Canadian professional football player who played for the Ottawa Rough Riders, Hamilton Tiger-Cats and Montreal Alouettes.

In the last game of the 1951 Big Four regular season, Ulysses Curtis of the Toronto Argonauts had intercepted the ball and had a clear run for a touchdown when Karpuk rushed off the Ottawa Rough Riders bench to tackle him at the Ottawa 24-yard line. After a 15-minute delay, the referee ruled that Toronto could not be awarded a touchdown or a new play at the 1-yard line, but would have to take their next play from the 12-yard line with a man advantage—a rule that Karpuk knew because he had discussed it in the past. The tactic was afterwards called "a Karpuk" by at least one commentator when it was used again in American football.

He won the Grey Cup with the Rough Riders that year.

Ten years later he was broke and was sentenced to three months in jail after pleading guilty to stealing $110 from a store; but the conviction was quashed on appeal.

He died of a heart attack in 1985.
