= Les Lear =

American gridiron football player and coach (1918–1979)

Profile
- Position: Offensive tackle

Personal information
- Born: August 22, 1918; Grafton, North Dakota, U.S.
- Died: January 5, 1979 (aged 60); Los Angeles, California, U.S.

Career information
- University: Manitoba

Career history

Playing
- 1938–1943: Winnipeg Blue Bombers
- 1944–1946: Cleveland/L.A. Rams
- 1947: Detroit Lions
- 1948–1950: Calgary Stampeders

Coaching
- 1948–1950: Calgary Stampeders (HC)

Awards and highlights
- NFL champion (1945); 3× Grey Cup champion (1939, 1941, 1948); Manitoba Sports Hall of Fame (2019); CFL All-Star - 1941, 1943
- Canadian Football Hall of Fame (Class of 1974)

Other information
- Horse racing career
- Occupations: Trainer and owner
- Sport: Horse racing

Major racing wins
- Major U.S. wins: Suwannee River Stakes (1962); Saratoga Special Stakes (1964); Laurel Futurity Stakes (1964); Garden State Stakes (1964); Sorority Stakes (1965); Kentucky Oaks (1966) Major Canadian Wins: Highlander Stakes (1960); Marine Stakes (1961); Manitoba Derby (1971); Toronto Cup Stakes (1971); Jockey Club Cup Handicap (1971)

Leslie Lear (August 22, 1918 – January 5, 1979) was a National Football League (NFL) and Canadian Football League (CFL) player and coach as well as an owner and trainer of Thoroughbred race horses.

== Football ==
He grew up in Manitoba, Canada, where he played guard at the University of Manitoba. Lear started his professional football career with the Winnipeg Blue Bombers of the Canadian Football League and helped the team to two Grey Cup victories. In 1944, he signed with the Cleveland Rams of the NFL becoming the first Canadian-trained player to play in the NFL. He would play a total of 4 seasons in the NFL. After his stint in the NFL, Lear returned to Canada where he coached the Grey Cup champion Calgary Stampeders to an undefeated season in 1948- the only CFL team to go undefeated in a season.

=== CFL coaching record ===
Team	Year	Regular season					Postseason		
Team	Year	Won	Lost	Ties	Win %	Finish	Won	Lost	Result
CGY	1948	12	0	0	1.000	1st in Western Interprovincial Football Union	3	0	Won Grey Cup
CGY	1949	13	1	0	.929	1st in Western Interprovincial Football Union	2	1	Lost in Grey Cup
CGY	1950	4	10	0	.286	4th in Western Interprovincial Football Union			
Total		29	11	0	.725		5	1	1 Grey Cup

== Horse racing ==
Following his retirement from football, Les Lear became involved in Thoroughbred horse racing both as a horse trainer and an owner.

== Later life and death ==
Lear was elected into the Canadian Football Hall of Fame in 1974. He died of kidney failure on January 5, 1979.

Lear was posthumously inducted into the Manitoba Sports Hall of Fame in 2019.
