= 36th Grey Cup =

1948 Canadian Football championship game

Calgary Stampeders	Ottawa Rough Riders
(12–0)	(10–2)
12	7
Head coach: Les Lear	Head coach: Walt Masters
	1	2	3	4	Total
Calgary Stampeders	0	6	0	6	12
Ottawa Rough Riders	1	0	6	0	7
- Date: November 27, 1948
- Stadium: Varsity Stadium
- Location: Toronto
- National anthem: None (a marching band played God Save The King instead)
- Attendance: 20,013

The 36th Grey Cup was played on November 27, 1948, before 20,013 fans at Varsity Stadium at Toronto.

The Calgary Stampeders defeated Ottawa Rough Riders 12–7. Calgary was the first team west of Winnipeg to win the Grey Cup.

The game is remembered fondly for being the year in which Calgary fans brought pageantry to the Grey Cup, as much as it was Calgary's first Grey Cup victory. Stamps fans created a party atmosphere by staging pancake breakfasts on the steps of City Hall, riding horses into the lobby of the prestigious Royal York Hotel, and starting parades, dances and parties everywhere.

== Game summary ==
The Calgary defence was able to stop the favoured Rough Rider drives at the 8, 10 and 22 yard lines and hold them scoreless. On one of these Ottawa had successfully faked a punt. On the next possession they ran the fake punt again but Howie Turner was stopped short and Calgary took over at their 46-yard line.

They quickly drove into Ottawa territory and scored on a "sleeper play" pass from Keith Spaith to Norm Hill in the end zone, which meant that Hill ran over to the far sidelines and flopped on the field, essentially hiding. Everybody in the stadium, except the Rough Riders on the field, saw this coming. Hill slipped before he had possession of the ball but he fell on his back and the ball dropped into his hands. Hill's score is sometimes called the "sit-down touchdown".

Bob Paffrath scored a touchdown for the Riders and they also scored a single.

In the final quarter Ottawa's Pete Karpuk fumbled a lateral. Calgary's Woody Strode recovered and returned it to the Ottawa eleven yard line. Karpuk did not attempt to recover his own fumble, believing that the whistle had blown. Pete Thodos scored the winning touchdown on an end rush that opened a large hole in the Ottawa defence while Dave "Baldy" Tomlinson successfully punted in the last winning points.

== Victory celebration ==
The summary of the victory celebration by Calgary Stampeders supporters at the Royal York Hotel after the game was reported by journalist Jim Coleman.

"The football game for the Grey Cup was contested officially in the stadium and was continued unofficially in the hotel lobby. At 5:01 p.m. the goalposts were borne triumphantly through the front doors and were erected against the railings of the mezzanine. At 5:02 p.m. two platoons of bellboys circumspectly removed the potted palms, flower vases and anything that weighed less than three thousand pounds. The gaudily caparisoned Calgary supporters were boisterous and noisy but well-behaved and courteously declined to ride their horses into the elevators. Any minor untoward incidents were occasioned by youthful local yahoos who suffered from the delusion that the consumption of two pints of ale and the acquisition of a pseudo-western twang entitled them to ride the range astride any convenient chesterfield".

— Jim Coleman, November 28, 1948

== Facts ==
- The "sleeper play" was made illegal in the CFL in 1961.
- The Calgary Stampeders were undefeated in all 15 games that they played this season, and as of 2024, the only team in the history of what is now the CFL to do so.
- Calgary's line up was: Archie McGillis (Manager), Woody Strode, Dave Tomlinson, Johny Aguirre, Paul Rowe, Keith Spaith, Dave Berry, Chick Chikowsky, Bill Pullar, Harry Anderson, Jim Mitchener, Chuck Anderson, Rod Pantages, Jack McGill, Jack Grogan (Past President), Rube Ludwig, Bert Iannone, Harry Hood, Fritz Hanson, Normie Kwong, Tom Brook (President), Les Lear (Coach), Pete Thodos, Bill Wusylk, Cliff Kliewer, Dave Adams, Rudy Singer, Bob Leatham, Fred Wilmot, Frank Porteous (Trainer), Bill Sherriff (Equipment Manager), Harold Geddes (Asst. Equipment Manager), Norm Carter, Cedric Gyles, Norm Hill, Jim Dobbin, Harry Irving.
- Among members of the Stampeders who went on to notoriety outside football, Normie Kwong served as Lieutenant Governor of Alberta from 2006 to 2010, and Woody Strode became an actor, appearing in films such as The Man Who Shot Liberty Valance.
