= Mewata Stadium =

Former multipurpose stadium in Calgary, Canada

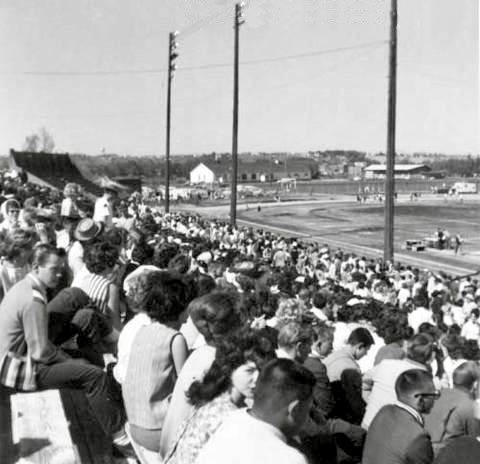
- Interactive map of Mewata Stadium
- Full name: Mewata Stadium
- Location: Calgary, Alberta, Canada
- Coordinates: 51°02′46″N 114°05′30″W
- Capacity: 10,000
- Surface: Grass

Construction
- Opened: 1906
- Closed: 1999
- Demolished: 1999

Tenants
- Calgary Bronks (1935-1940); Bronks returned after WWII as Calgary Stampeders (1945-1959); Calgary Mustangs (1983); Calgary Kickers (1987–1989)

Mewata Stadium (/məˈwɑːtə/ mə-WAH-tə) was a multi-purpose stadium in Calgary, Alberta, Canada. It was the home stadium of the Calgary Stampeders, both before and after the formation of the Canadian Football League in 1958, until they moved to McMahon Stadium for the 1960 season, where the team still plays.

The land for Mewata Park was a gift from the Government of Canada. The Mewata Stadium opened in 1906, and by 1919 (if not earlier) had bleachers with a seating capacity of 10,000.

The stadium was closed and demolished in 1999 and replaced with Shaw Millennium Park, including a greenspace and skateboard park.

== Other uses ==
Mewata Stadium was briefly the home of two Calgary soccer teams, the Calgary Mustangs of the Canadian Professional Soccer League in 1983 and the Calgary Kickers of the Canadian Soccer League from 1987 through 1989.

During World War II, 1st Battalion, The Calgary Highlanders, used the bleachers at Mewata Stadium to pose for unit photographs before departing for overseas service. The Highlanders had mobilized 1st Battalion for war service on 1 September 1939 and garrisoned at the adjacent Mewata Armouries until the summer of 1940. The Highlanders used the stadium for training purposes.
