= Calgary Stampeders =

Professional Canadian football team

- Current season
- Logo
- Uniforms

General information
- Founded: January 24, 1945
- Stadium: McMahon Stadium
- Headquartered: Calgary, Alberta, Canada
- Colours: Red, white, black
- Fight song: Ye Men of Calgary
- Mascot: Ralph the Dog
- Website: stampeders.com

Personnel
- Owner: Calgary Sports and Entertainment
- General manager: Dave Dickenson
- Head coach: Dave Dickenson

Nicknames
- Stamps, Horsemen

Home fields
- Mewata Park Stadium (1945–1959); McMahon Stadium (1960–present)

League / conference affiliations
- Canadian Football League: West Division

Championships
- Grey Cup wins: 8 (1948, 1971, 1992, 1998, 2001, 2008, 2014, 2018)

The Calgary Stampeders are a professional Canadian football team based in Calgary. The Stampeders compete in the West Division of the Canadian Football League (CFL). The club plays its home games at McMahon Stadium and are the fifth oldest active franchise in the CFL. The Stampeders were officially founded in 1945, although there were clubs operating in Calgary since the 1890s.

The Calgary Stampeders have won eight Grey Cups, most recently in 2018, from their appearances in 17 Grey Cup Championship games. They have won 20 Western Division Championships and one Northern Division Championship in the franchise's history. The team has a provincial rivalry with the Edmonton Elks, as well as fierce divisional rivalries with the Saskatchewan Roughriders and the BC Lions.

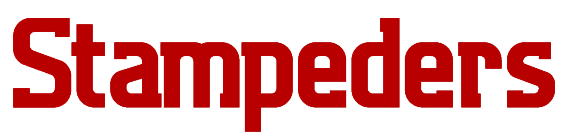
Team wordmark

== History ==
=== 1891–1940: Football in Calgary ===
Prior to the formation of the Stampeders in 1945, football in Calgary can be dated back as early as 1891, when Edmonton defeated Calgary 6–5 in the Alberta Total-point Challenge Series. A team from Edmonton (actually the outlying community of Fort Saskatchewan) had a picture taken of themselves after they defeated a Calgary team (in Calgary,) declaring themselves Champions of Alberta; the picture has two dates on it, being taken in either 1893 or 1895.

The Calgary Rugby Foot-ball Club played for the Alberta championship in 1907, became the Calgary Tigers and joined the Calgary Rugby Football Union in 1908 and the Alberta Rugby Football Union in 1911. The ensuing decades saw Calgary based teams come and go; including the Calgary Canucks, the 50th Battalion, the Tigers again, the Calgary Altomahs, and finally the Calgary Bronks of the Western Interprovincial Football Union. These teams were a dominant force in Alberta football, winning the AFRU championship 15 times over the next 25 years. World War II and 1940 brought a halt to football in Calgary, the final year for the Bronks.

None of these earlier Calgary based teams are part of the Stampeders official history or records.

=== 1945–1959: The early years and an undefeated season ===
The WIFU returned to Calgary on September 29, 1945, with the formation of the Calgary Stampeders. In their first game played on October 20 at Mewata Stadium they beat the Regina Roughriders 12–0 before 4,000 fans in attendance. It was a victory under the direction of head coach Les Lear and the athletes such as Woody Strode, Paul Rowe, Keith Spaith, Dave Berry, Normie Kwong and Ezzert "Sugarfoot" Anderson.

The year 1948 was perhaps the greatest season in Stamps history, achieving a perfect regular season of 12–0 and capping the year a 2-0-1 record in the playoffs including a Grey Cup victory over the Ottawa Rough Riders at Toronto's Varsity Stadium, memorable for the team's scoring a touchdown on a "sleeper play". It was also during that same Grey Cup festival that Calgary fans brought pageantry to the game and made it into a national celebration, featuring pancake breakfasts on the steps of City Hall, starting the Grey Cup parade and even riding a horse in the lobby of the Royal York Hotel.

They returned to the Grey Cup the following year (1949), with a 13–1 record but lost to the Montreal Alouettes 28–15 in the title game. It was 19 years until Calgary once again reached the Grey Cup, losing 24–21 to Ottawa in the 1968 final and not until 1971 when they were crowned champions, defeating the Toronto Argonauts 14–11. The Stampeders, like all the teams playing in the WIFU and IRFU, joined the newly formed Canadian Football League in 1958.

=== 1960–1971: A New Stadium ===
The year 1960 brought the Stampeders a new home, McMahon Stadium. Their first game in their new stadium was on August 15, 1960, a 38–23 loss to the Winnipeg Blue Bombers.

From 1968 to 1971, the Stampeders made it to the Grey Cup game three out of those four years (missing in 1969), winning it in 1971.

=== 1972–1989: Save Our Stamps ===
After having some great years at the end of the 1960s which culminated in their 1971 Grey Cup championship, 1972 started a long period of struggles for the Stampeders. In the 18 seasons from 1972 to 1989, the Stampeders made the playoffs only 7 times, and although they reached the Western Final in 1978 and 1979 under Jack Gotta (which were their only two playoff wins and appearances for the rest of the 1970s) losing both times to their provincial rivals in Edmonton, who were in the midst of an unprecedented five-year Grey Cup victory run at the time), the next decade was less than kind to the team. During the 1980s, the Stampeders were the only CFL team that did not win a playoff game (the team made five appearances during the decade, all but one of which came on the road and all resulting in losses in the West Semi-Final).

The Stampeders nearly folded after the 1985 season due to years of declining attendance, financial woes and a poor 3–13 record. However, a successful Save Our Stamps campaign in 1986 resulted in season ticket sales of 22,400, additional funds and stability that translated to improved on-field play which laid the groundwork for both their first playoff win since 1979 in 1990, and back-to-back Grey Cup berths in 1991 and 1992 when they won the title over Winnipeg.

=== 1990–2002: Wally Buono era ===
Wally Buono took over the head coaching duties in 1990 (after having served as an assistant coach for the previous three years). Late in the 1991 season, the team, after being community-owned since its inception, went private when Larry Ryckman purchased the team. The next 13 years were some of the most successful years in Stampeders history. Led by quarterbacks Doug Flutie, Jeff Garcia and Dave Dickenson, receivers Allen Pitts, Terry Vaughn and Dave Sapunjis, and a rock-steady defence led by Western All Stars Alondra Johnson, Stu Laird, and Will Johnson the Stampeders racked up a 153–79–2 record during these years. They reached the Grey Cup six times, winning in 1992, 1998, and 2001, losing in 1991, 1995, and 1999. In 1996, Ryckman was found by the Alberta Securities Commission to have run a stock manipulation scheme, was fined $492,000 and was forced to give up the Stampeders, who were subsequently purchased by Sig Gutsche via a receivership court for $1.6 million on April 3. Gutsche helped rectify the team's debts and made the team profitable again. The team finished the 1990s having made the playoffs in every year that decade.

On October 8, 2001, Sig Gutsche sold the team to California businessman Michael Feterik. Unlike previous owners, Feterik was intimately involved in the club's football operations. Feterik's most notorious move was to give the starting quarterback position to his son Kevin Feterik, angering both fans and Buono. Buono left to join the BC Lions after the 2002 CFL season.

=== 2003–2007: Coaching carousel ===
After Wally Buono departed from the Stampeders, the team went through three different head coaches in three years. Jim Barker succeeded Buono in 2003, but was let go after a 5–13 season, and he was replaced by Matt Dunigan, who fared no better in his lone season in 2004, going 4–14. The coaching carousel ended with Tom Higgins taking over in 2005, who brought the team back to respectability led by Henry Burris at quarterback and Joffrey Reynolds at running back, but lost in three straight years in the 2005, 2006, and 2007 Western semi-final games in that span. During this time, the team lost money, and in January 2005, Feterik sold the team to a group led by Ted Hellard, Doug Mitchell and former Stampeder John Forzani, and the Calgary Flames Limited Partnership, the organization that represents the NHL's Calgary Flames.

=== 2008–2015: Hufnagel years ===
In 2008, one-time Stamps QB John Hufnagel took the coaching reins, and the Stampeders ended their playoff victory drought en route to winning the team's sixth Grey Cup 22–14 against the Montreal Alouettes. Burris was named the Grey Cup Most Valuable Player with DeAngelis being the top Canadian for their efforts. John Hufnagel had been interviewed by several NFL and college football teams, but is still the team's general manager to this day. Hufnagel was also the team's head coach until the end of the 2015 season, when he turned over the head coaching duties to former Stampeder and BC Lions star Dave Dickenson.

Between 2009 and 2014, the Stampeders reached the Western Final every year except 2011, when the team lost the semi-final game to the Eskimos in Edmonton, 33–19. The following year, the organization by now known as Calgary Sports and Entertainment became the majority owner of the team; the company previously only had a 5% stake in the team. They were able to reach the Grey Cup game that year only to come up short against the Argonauts, falling by a score of 35–22. Following another defeat in the Western Final in 2013, the Stampeders were once again able to reach the Grey Cup the following year. This time, they came out on top with the franchise's seventh championship, defeating the Hamilton Tiger-Cats 20–16.

=== 2016–present: Dave Dickenson at the helm ===
After the 2015 season, Hufnagel stepped down from his dual responsibility as head coach and general manager, becoming purely a general manager and handing the coaching reins to former Stamps QB Dave Dickenson. The Stamps continued their success in 2016, winning the West Division again with a 15–2–1 record, but falling to the third-year Ottawa Redblacks in the 104th Grey Cup in overtime.

In 2017, the Stampeders finished 13-4-1 (with the league's best record for the season) and made their second straight Grey Cup appearance, but lost to the Toronto Argonauts again, just as they did five years earlier.

In 2018, the Stampeders finished 13-5 and made a third straight Grey Cup appearance, winning the title over the Redblacks 27–16 in Edmonton. Bo Levi Mitchell won Most Outstanding Player at the 2018 CFL Awards as well as the Grey Cup Most Valuable Player. Lemar Durant was named the game's Most Valuable Canadian. The Calgary Stampeders quest for a fourth consecutive Grey Cup appearance came to an abrupt end in 2019, as the team lost a step, finishing second in the West with a 12–6 record, falling to the eventual Grey Cup champion Winnipeg Blue Bombers in the West Semi-Final 35–14.

The CFL went on hiatus in 2020, but returned in 2021, and the Stampeders finished one game back of the Saskatchewan Roughriders in the shortened 2021 season with an 8–6 record. The team met an early playoff exit at the hands of the Riders in the West Semi-Final in an overtime heartbreaker, 33–30. The team reached the playoffs again in 2022 with a 12–6 record, but fell to the second place BC Lions in the West Semi-Final 30–16. On December 12, 2022, it was announced that Dickenson had been named the team's new general manager in addition to retaining his head coaching duties.

== Grey Cup championships ==
Year	Winning team	Score	Losing team	Title	Location
1948	Calgary Stampeders	12–7	Ottawa Rough Riders	36th Grey Cup	Varsity Stadium, Toronto
1971	Calgary Stampeders	14–11	Toronto Argonauts	59th Grey Cup	Empire Stadium, Vancouver
1992	Calgary Stampeders	24–10	Winnipeg Blue Bombers	80th Grey Cup	SkyDome, Toronto
1998	Calgary Stampeders	26–24	Hamilton Tiger-Cats	86th Grey Cup	Winnipeg Stadium, Winnipeg
2001	Calgary Stampeders	27–19	Winnipeg Blue Bombers	89th Grey Cup	Olympic Stadium, Montreal
2008	Calgary Stampeders	22–14	Montreal Alouettes	96th Grey Cup	Olympic Stadium, Montreal
2014	Calgary Stampeders	20–16	Hamilton Tiger-Cats	102nd Grey Cup	BC Place, Vancouver
2018	Calgary Stampeders	27–16	Ottawa Redblacks	106th Grey Cup	Commonwealth Stadium, Edmonton

== Honoured players ==
=== Canadian Football Hall of Famers ===
Calgary Stampeders in the Canadian Football Hall of Fame
Players
No.	Name	Inducted	Position(s)	Tenure
22	Paul Rowe	1964	RB	1945 - 1950
-	Dean Griffing	1965	C	1945 - 1947
95	Norman Kwong	1969	RB	1948 - 1950
55	Wayne Harris	1976	LB	1961 - 1972
21	Harvey Wylie	1980	DB	1956 - 1964
27	Earl Lunsford	1983	RB	1956, 1959–1963
77	John Helton	1986	DT	1969 - 1978
62	Don Luzzi	1986	OT / DT	1958 - 1969
56	Tony Pajaczkowski	1988	OG	1955 - 1965
76	Herman Harrison	1993	LB / TE	1964 - 1972
15	Larry Robinson	1998	DB / K	1961 - 1975
10	Willie Burden	2001	RB	1974–1981
18	Allen Pitts	2006	WR	1990–2000
59	Rocco Romano	2007	OG	1987, 1992 - 2000
20	Doug Flutie	2008	QB	1992–1996
51	Alondra Johnson	2009	LB	1991 - 2003
15	Dave Dickenson	2015	QB	1996–2000, 2009
32	Kelvin Anderson	2017	RB	1996–2002
9	Jon Cornish	2019	RB	2007–2015
Coaches and Contributors
Name		Inducted	Position(s)	Tenure
Dean Griffing		1965	Coach, Owner	1945 - 1947
A.G. "Tony" Anselmo		2009	President	1973–1974

=== Retired numbers ===
5	Harry Hood
10	Willie Burden
13	Mark McLoughlin
18	Allen Pitts
22	Tom Forzani
55	Wayne Harris
75	Stu Laird

=== The Presidents' Ring ===
The Presidents' Ring was established in 1967 by Calgary Stampeders Football Club team president George McMahon and general manager Rogers Lehew. Formerly presented to the team's most valuable player, it is currently awarded to the player who best demonstrates leadership ability. As of 2012, 29 players have won the award, including three-time winners Henry Burris, Danny Barrett and Stu Laird.

- 1967 Wayne Harris
- 1968 Herm Harrison
- 1969 Jerry Keeling
- 1970 Wayne Harris
- 1971 Jerry Keeling
- 1972 Larry Robinson
- 1973 Rudy Linterman
- 1974 John Helton
- 1975 Willie Burden
- 1976 Tom Forzani
- 1977 Willie Burden
- 1978 James Sykes
- 1979 Ed McAleney
- 1980 James Sykes
- 1981 Lloyd Fairbanks
- 1982 Ed McAleney
- 1983 Danny Bass
- 1984 Lyall Woznesensky
- 1985 Bernie Morrison
- 1986 Bob Poley
- 1987 Bernie Morrison
- 1988 Stu Laird
- 1989 Danny Barrett
- 1990 Danny Barrett
- 1991 Lloyd Fairbanks
- 1992 Stu Laird
- 1993 Andy McVey
- 1994 Allen Pitts
- 1995 Stu Laird
- 1996 Danny Barrett
- 1997 Rocco Romano
- 1998 Mark McLoughlin
- 1999 Allen Pitts
- 2000 Dave Dickenson
- 2001 Alondra Johnson
- 2002 Alondra Johnson
- 2003 Joe Fleming
- 2004 Jamie Crysdale
- 2005 Jay McNeil
- 2006 Jay McNeil
- 2007 Henry Burris
- 2008 Henry Burris
- 2009 Henry Burris
- 2010 Rob Lazeo
- 2011 Keon Raymond
- 2012 Keon Raymond
- 2013 Rob Cote
- 2014 Corey Mace
- 2015 Rob Cote
- 2016 Deron Mayo
- 2017 Josh Bell
- 2018 Micah Johnson

=== Wall of Fame ===
The Stampeders Wall of Fame recognizes the greatest players and most important off-field contributors in Stampeders history; it was Instituted in 1985.

Players:
- 1985 Paul Rowe 1945–50
- 1985 Wayne Harris 1961–72
- 1985 John Helton 1969–78
- 1986 Don Luzzi 1958–69
- 1986 Larry Robinson 1961–74
- 1988 Herm Harrison 1964–72
- 1988 Harvey Wylie 1956–64
- 1990 Jerry Keeling 1961–72
- 1990 Sugarfoot Anderson 1949–54
- 1992 Willie Burden 1974–81
- 1992 Harry Langford 1950–58
- 1994 Tom Forzani 1973–83
- 1994 Earl Lunsford 1956, 1959–63
- 1996 Tony Pajaczkowski 1955–65
- 1996 Lloyd Fairbanks 1975–82, 1989–91
- 1999 Lovell Coleman 1960–67
- 1999 George Hansen 1959–66
- 2002 Peter Liske 1966–68, 1973–74
- 2002 Keith Spaith 1948–54
- 2004 Allen Pitts 1990–2000
- 2006 Dave Sapunjis 1990–96
- 2006 J.T. Hay 1979–88
- 2008 Doug Flutie 1992–95
- 2008 Frank Andruski 1966–73
- 2008 Rocco Romano 1987, 1992–2000
- 2010 Alondra Johnson 1991–2003
- 2010 Will Johnson 1989–96
- 2010 Bernie Morrison 1978–88
- 2012 Kelvin Anderson 1996–2002
- 2012 Jeff Garcia 1994–98
- 2012 Rudy Linterman 1968–77
- 2012 Gerry Shaw 1965–74
- 2014 Ron Allbright 1956–67
- 2014 Jamie Crysdale 1993-2005
- 2014 Stu Laird 1984-96
- 2014 James Skyes 1978-83

Builders:

- 2001 Tony Anselmo
- 2001 Tom Brook
- 2001 Roy Jennings
- 2001 George L. McMahon
- 2001 Frank McMahon
- 2004 Rogers Lehew
- 2004 Stan Schwartz
- 2006 Dr. Vince Murphy
- 2010 Jim Finks
- 2012 Normie Kwong
- 2012 Sig Gutsche
- 2014 Pat Clayton
- 2014 George Hopkins

== Front office ==
=== Builders of note ===
Builders honoured as of 2012

- 2001: Tony Anselmo
- 2001: Tom Brook
- 2001: Roy Jennings
- 2001: George L. McMahon
- 2001: Frank McMahon
- 2004: Rogers Lehew
- 2004: Stan Schwartz
- 2006: Dr. Vince Murphy
- 2010: Jim Finks
- 2012: Sig Gutsche
- 2012: Norman Kwong

=== Head coaches ===
- Dean Griffing (1945–1947)
- Les Lear (1948–1952)
- Bob Snyder (1953)
- Larry Siemering (1954)
- Jack Hennemier (1955–1956)
- Otis Douglas (1956–1960) (Douglas resigned August 19, 1960 with the Stampeders 0–2–1)
- Jim Finks (1960) (GM Finks acted as co-ordinator of the coaching staff for the August 22 loss to the BC Lions.)
- Steve Owen (1960) (Owen was hired August 23, 1960 with the Stampeders 0–3–1)
- Bobby Dobbs (1961–1964)
- Jerry Williams (1965–1968, 1981)
- Jim Duncan (1969–1973)
- Jim Wood (1973–1975)
- Bob Baker (1975–1976)
- Joe Tiller (1976)
- Jack Gotta (1977–1979, 1982–1983)
- Ardell Wiegandt (1980–1981)
- Steve Buratto (1984–1985)
- Bud Riley (1985)
- Bob Vespaziani (1986–1987)
- Lary Kuharich (1987–1989)
- Wally Buono (1990–2002)
- Jim Barker (2003)
- Matt Dunigan (2004)
- Tom Higgins (2005–2007)
- John Hufnagel (2008–2015)
- Dave Dickenson (2016–Present)

=== General managers ===
- Bob Robinett (1953–1955)
- Bob Masterson (1956–1957)
- Jim Finks (1957–1964)
- Pat Mahoney (1964)
- Rogers Lehew (1965–1973)
- Gary Hobson (1974–1976)
- Jack Gotta (1977–1983)
- Steve Buratto (1984)
- Earl Lunsford (1985–1987)
- Vern Siemens (1987) Interim
- Norm Kwong (1988–1991)
- Wally Buono (1992–2002)
- Fred Fateri (2003)
- Mark McLoughlin (2003)
- Matt Dunigan (2004)
- Jim Barker (2005–2007)
- John Hufnagel (2008–2022)
- Dave Dickenson (2022–present)

=== Majority Owners ===
- Community Ownership (1945 to October 23, 1991)
- Larry Ryckman (October 23, 1991 to April 3, 1996)
- Sig Gutsche (April 3, 1996 to October 8, 2001)
- Michael Feterik (October 8, 2001 to January 2005)
- Local Private Ownership (January 2005 to March 29, 2012)
- Calgary Sports and Entertainment (March 29, 2012 to present)

== Current coaching staff ==
Calgary Stampeders staff
Front office: President – Jay McNeil; General manager – Dave Dickenson; Director of Player Personnel – Brendan Mahoney; Director of U.S. Scouting – Cole Hufnagel; Football Administration Director – Molly Campbell; Director of Football Operations – Nick Bojda; CFL Draft Coordinator – Dwayne Cameron; Head coach: Head coach – Dave Dickenson; Offensive coaches: Offensive Coordinator and Running Backs – Pat DelMonaco; Quarterbacks – Jarious Jackson; Receivers – Markus Howell; Offensive Line – Ucambre Williams; Offensive and Special Teams Assistant – Colton Hunchak	Defensive coaches: Defensive Coordinator – Bob Slowik; Linebackers and Run Game Coordinator – Marcus Klund; Defensive Line – John Bowman; Defensive Backs – Barron Miles; Special teams coaches: Special Teams Coordinator – Craig Dickenson; Strength and conditioning: Strength and Conditioning – Daryl Chambers; → Coaching Staff → More CFL staffs

== Current roster ==
Calgary Stampeders roster
**Quarterbacks**: 3 Vernon Adams; 12 Josh Love; 19 Quincy Vaughn; **Receivers**: 89 Ajou Ajou; 80 Damien Alford; 14 Clark Barnes; 17 Dejon Brissett; 87 Erik Brooks; 82 Jesulayomi Ojutalayo; 85 Jalen Philpot; **Running backs**: 28 Ludovick Choquette; 34 Tyreik McAllister; 26 Dedrick Mills; **Fullbacks**: None	**Offensive linemen**: 63 Brad Ashmore; 66 Bryce Bell; 60 D'Antne Demery; 57 Chris Fortin; 65 Christy Nkanu; 67 Zack Williams; **Defensive linemen**: 90 Miles Brown; 92 Savio Frazier; 1 Clarence Hicks; 96 Jaylon Hutchings; 47 George Idoko; 50 Khairi Manns; 98 Tristan Marois; 7 Folarin Orimolade; 77 Kelon Thomas	**Linebackers**: 51 Kelechi Anyalebechi; 8 Marquel Lee; 48 R. J. Moten; 41 Eric Rascoe; 42 Micah Teitz; 2 Kyle Wilson; **Defensive backs**: 33 Zy Alexander; 25 Jaydon Grant; 0 Adrian Greene; 44 Anthony Johnson; 29 Ben Labrosse; 6 Derrick Moncrief; 27 Godfrey Onyeka; 9 Damon Webb; **Special teams**: 43 Jason MacGougan LS; 30 René Paredes K; 15 Mark Vassett P	**Reserve**: 4 Tevin Jones WR; 16 Ben Wooldridge QB; **1-game injured**: 31 Anton Haie DB; **6-game injured**: 38 Sheldon Arnold DB; 84 Reggie Begelton WR; 21 Bailey Devine-Scott DB; 94 Elijah Hills DL; 99 Daniel Joseph DL; 52 Preston Nichols OL; 97 Justin Sambu DL; 93 Charles Wiley DL	**Practice roster**: 61 William Barnes OL; 45 Lance Boykin DB; 54 Bakyne Coly OL; 36 Terrence Ganyi LB; 58 Daniel Grzesiak DL; 83 Jeremiah Hunter WR; 35 BoPete Keyes DB; 91 Collin Kornelson DL; 37 Jude McAtamney K; 20 Deonta McMahon RB; 24 Ashton Miller-Melancon DB; 40 Jackson Sombach DB; 59 Matthew Stokman OL; **Suspended**: 32 Ike Larsen DB
Italics indicate American player • **Bold** indicates Global player • 45 Active, 2 Reserve, 9 Injured, 13 Practice, 1 Suspended; Roster updated 2026-09-07 • Depth chart • Transactions • More CFL rosters

== See also ==
- Calgary Stampeders all-time records and statistics
