= Osborne Stadium =

Multi-sport outdoor stadium in Winnipeg, Manitoba

- Interactive map of Osborne Stadium
- Former names: Bomber Stadium (1936–1937)
- Location: Winnipeg, Manitoba, Canada
- Coordinates: 49.8835057°N 97.1500182°W
- Owner: City of Winnipeg
- Capacity: 7,800 (football); 5,000 (baseball)
- Surface: Grass

Construction
- Built: 1932
- Demolished: 1956

Tenants
- Winnipeg Blue Bombers (CFL) (1935–1952); Mandak League (1950–1956)

Osborne Stadium was a multi-sport outdoor stadium in Winnipeg, Manitoba, Canada. It operated from 1932 until 1956, and hosted Canadian football home games for the Winnipeg Blue Bombers and baseball games in the Mandak League. The stadium was also home to local high school football, soccer, baseball and softball games.

== History ==
Opening night for Osborne Stadium was on May 19, 1932, with an admission price of 25 Canadian cents to see both a girls' softball game and a men's soccer game. The opening ceremony included music by the Princess Patricia's Canadian Light Infantry marching band from CFB Shilo; and local dignitaries, Ralph Webb the Mayor of Winnipeg, John Bracken the Premier of Manitoba, and members of the Legislative Assembly of Manitoba.

The stadium was located on the west side of Osborne Street North opposite of the Manitoba Legislative Building, and hosted games for Canadian football, high school football, soccer, baseball, and softball. It was constructed with a floodlight system for nighttime games, had a permanent seating capacity of 4,000 which included 2,600 seats on the east side and 1,400 seats on the west side, and temporarily added 2,500 seats for special events. Construction of the stadium required the removal of houses in the residential West Broadway neighbourhood, and the stadium was later enlarged to include 7,800 permanent seats as of 1935.

The stadium was home the Winnipeg Blue Bombers from 1935 until 1952. Local sports executive Jimmy Dunn presided over both the Greater Winnipeg Senior Girls' Softball League and the Greater Winnipeg Senior Baseball League played at the stadium, and was a regular behind the microphone entertaining spectators during baseball games. The Manitoba Senior Baseball League began play at the stadium in 1948, then became the international Mandak League in 1950. The 1950 Red River flood inundated the stadium which postponed the beginning of that year's baseball season.

The Blue Bombers relocated to Winnipeg Stadium for the 1953 football season. Osborne Stadium was demolished in 1956, and the site is now occupied by the Canada Life building.
