= West Division (CFL) =

Regional division of the Canadian Football League

- Formerly: Western Canada Rugby Football Union (1911–1935); Tri-City Rugby Football League (de facto, 1928); Western Interprovincial Football Union (1936–1960); Western Football Conference (1961–1980)
- League: Canadian Rugby Union (1921–1958); Canadian Football Council (1956–1958); Canadian Football League (1958–1994, (Note: All Canadian teams competed in the North Division in 1995, although the teams still played all of their traditional regional opponents twice in the expanded league. Two Western teams (Calgary and Edmonton) ultimately reached the North final.) 1996–present)
- Sport: Canadian football
- Founded: 1911; 115 years ago (as WCRFU); 1981; 45 years ago (current name and organizational structure)
- No. of teams: 5
- Most recent champion: Saskatchewan Roughriders (29th title)
- Most titles: Edmonton Elks (23 titles)

The West Division is one of the two regional divisions of the Canadian Football League (CFL), its counterpart being the East Division. Although the CFL was not founded until 1958, the West Division and its clubs are descended from earlier leagues.

With a few exceptions, a senior men's football championship has been contested in Western Canada since 1911, and with a few additional exceptions the Western champion has played the Eastern champion for the Grey Cup. Although its teams have been members of the CFL since 1958, the then-Western Football Conference remained a distinct legal entity until 1981.

The five teams in the West Division are the BC Lions, Calgary Stampeders, Edmonton Elks, Saskatchewan Roughriders, and Winnipeg Blue Bombers. The now-defunct Las Vegas Posse and Sacramento Gold Miners from the mid 1990s United States expansion of the CFL also played in the West Division. Additionally, the Winnipeg Blue Bombers have played three separate stints in the East Division, during seasons in which the divisions needed to be rebalanced due to league expansion, contraction, or reorganization.

== History ==
=== Pre–1936 ===
The first organized football club in Western Canada was the Winnipeg Rugby Football Club which was founded in 1879. At the time the sport was generally called rugby or rugby football because its rules were similar to rugby union's, although this would change drastically in the coming decades. The first organized competition in the West was formed in 1888. Winnipeg Rugby Football Club, St.John's Rugby Football Club and the Royal School of Infantry / 90th Regiment formed the Manitoba Rugby League, later re-organized as the Manitoba Rugby Football Union. Football was being played in what was to become Alberta and Saskatchewan by 1890, and by 1907 the new provinces had organized their own respective competitions and agreed to adopt the rules of the national governing body, the Canadian Rugby Union.

Initially, interest in rugby football was mostly confined to the prairie provinces. As is the case today, ice hockey was Western Canada's most popular sport, and the presence of what were recognized to be "major league" professional circuits in Western Canada initially served to limit the resources which the fledgling senior football unions on the prairies could muster. The collapse of the last such "major" Western hockey league in 1926 opened a void that was quickly filled by football, with a provincial union finally being formed in British Columbia that same year. The four rugby unions in the West were named the Manitoba Rugby Football Union, Saskatchewan Rugby Football Union, Alberta Rugby Football Union and the British Columbia Rugby Football Union.

Until the mid-1930s, the Western provincial unions usually maintained separate regular season schedules. However, they soon set out to create a unified Western Canadian playoff structure involving the respective provincial champions, with the view that the Western champion ought to be allowed to challenge for the Canadian Rugby Union's new championship trophy, the Grey Cup. To this end, the Manitoba, Saskatchewan and Alberta unions formed the Western Canada Rugby Football Union in 1911, with the Calgary Tigers winning the first Western championship later that year. The format often changed from year to year, in large part because provincial champions often declined to participate in the Western playoffs while during the latter years of World War I the competition was suspended altogether. In the years following the establishment of the BCRFU, the Western playoffs usually took the form of a four-team bracket – on these occasions, to reduce travel costs the BCRFU champion usually played the ARFU champion while the SRFU champion played the MRFU champion, with the winners of those games competing in the Western Final.

Initially, Western champions were not permitted to compete for the Grey Cup, because the CRU believed the calibre of the Western clubs to be inferior to those in the East. Such perceptions were reinforced in 1913 when the Hamilton Tigers toured Western Canada for a series of exhibition games, as Hamilton easily defeated all four Western opponents they faced. It was not until 1921 that a Western team was finally allowed to compete in the Grey Cup game, when the Edmonton Eskimos lost 23–0 to the Toronto Argonauts. Initial challenges for the trophy met with futility – a large factor in this lack of success was the requirement that the Western champion travel to the East to compete in the championship game, but the main reason was that clubs in the larger Eastern markets were able to make the transition from amateur to professional status more quickly.

The first attempt to create a unified Western circuit came in 1928 when Regina, Moose Jaw and two Winnipeg sides formed the Tri-City Rugby Football League. This experiment was abandoned after one year due to travel expenses. However, the league notably introduced the concept (then established in hockey, but unheard of in gridiron football) of an automatic end-of-season playoff between the regular season winner and runner-up. This postseason format would later be adopted when the western unions merged permanently.

Finally in 1935 a Western team, the Winnipeg Pegs (soon to be known as the present-day Blue Bombers) captured the Grey Cup, after they defeated the Hamilton Tigers (one of the forerunner teams to the modern Hamilton Tiger-Cats) 18–12. However, despite Winnipeg's national title (or perhaps even indirectly because of it) football in Western Canada was in crisis by the mid-1930s. The Great Depression, which had caused serious financial difficulties for professional sports across North America, hit Western Canada particularly hard. Making matters worse was the existence of massive disparity between teams within the provincial unions. For example, by 1935 the Regina Roughriders had won fourteen consecutive SRFU titles, mostly by lopsided margins. Moreover, by the 1930s the top Western teams had begun to tap the massive U.S. talent pool, signing American players who had been passed over by the National Football League and its rivals south of the border. While the presence of American players (later called "imports" and today officially known as "internationals") would play a decisive role in bringing the calibre of the top Western teams to a level approaching that of the top clubs in the East, it further exacerbated the disparity within the Western provincial unions.

=== Western Interprovincial Football Union (1936–1960) ===
In a bid to stabilize and improve the quality of the game in Western Canada, the Winnipeg Blue Bombers of the MRFU, the Regina Roughriders of the SRFU and the Calgary Bronks of the ARFU decided to break away from their provincial unions and form a new elite competition, the Western Interprovincial Football Union.

The MRFU ceased operations almost immediately. However, the SRFU, ARFU and WCRFU all initially resisted the formation of the new league. The WCRFU insisted that Western teams could only compete for the Grey Cup by remaining in their respective provincial unions – meaning that the new WIFU faced the threat of being branded an "outlaw" league. Calgary and Regina reluctantly agreed to play in both the WIFU and their respective provincial unions for the 1936 season, with both clubs fielding weaker "B" sides in provincial competition. Regina would go on to win the first Western championship following the formation of the WIFU, only to find themselves barred by the CRU from competing in the Grey Cup. The WIFU had ignored a rule implemented by the CRU immediately following Winnipeg's first Grey Cup win strictly limiting the use of American players in Canadian football.

By the following season, the ARFU and SRFU had both collapsed. The North Western League was organized in an effort to replace the Albertan and Saskatchewan unions, leaving the BCRFU as the only purely provincial union operating in Western Canada. The WCRFU subsequently agreed to a format whereby the BCRFU and NWL champions would have the right to challenge the WIFU champion for the right to represent the West in the Grey Cup. Ultimately, no such challenge would be issued by either league, neither of which survived World War II. The WIFU expanded to four teams when the Edmonton Eskimos joined in 1938. The Eskimos lasted only two years before withdrawing following the outbreak of the war. The Bronks left the following year, but were replaced by the Vancouver Grizzlies following the collapse of the BCRFU. This arrangement lasted only one season, with the WIFU suspending operations altogether for the duration of the war in 1942.

During this time, the WIFU's relationship with the CRU remained strained. Teams in the Western league continued to push for rule changes intended in part to make the game more attractive to U.S. players familiar with the American game. This came to a head in 1940 when the CRU again barred the Western champion Blue Bombers from the Grey Cup on the grounds that the West had played using rules that differed from those in the East.

Perhaps the most important pre-war development, implemented in both East and West on a permanent basis for the 1936 season, was the introduction of automatic divisional playoffs. Other than the aforementioned short-lived Tri-City League, prior to the formation of the WIFU, the playoff format in Western Canadian football was similar to the format used in U.S. professional leagues right up to the introduction of the Super Bowl in that playoff qualification was limited to union winners and intra-provincial playoffs were only used (when necessary) to break ties in the standings. However, the founders of the WIFU had come to recognize the popularity of the Western playoffs as well as the need to ensure as many regular season games as possible were meaningful so as to encourage fans to attend games, and therefore decided that a multi-team playoff was necessary for the league to remain solvent. The playoffs consisted of the top two teams until Edmonton joined the league in 1938, when they were expanded to three teams, reverting again to two teams after Edmonton dropped out of the WIFU.

Following the war, the league resumed play in 1945 with Winnipeg, Regina and the newly formed Calgary Stampeders. In 1945, the three teams competed in a playoff in lieu of a regular season, but the competition was fully resumed by 1946. The Regina Roughriders became the Saskatchewan Roughriders in 1948, the Edmonton Eskimos (renamed to Elks in 2021) permanently rejoined the league in 1949, and in 1950 the third-place team was once again granted a playoff berth. The regular season schedule was also expanded, from eight games per team in 1946 to 12 in 1948 and 14 in 1949 before settling on a 16-game schedule in 1952. The West's schedule remained longer than any other regular season schedule in professional football for more than two decades. The expansion of the schedule coincided with the WIFU's gradual transition into a professional competition. However, players were paid under the table well into the 1940s in order to keep up the pretense of amateurism, though it was an open secret that the WIFU had become professional. The WIFU's increasing professionalism, combined with the growing use of air travel in Canada, made expansion to Vancouver a more feasible option. In 1954, the BC Lions joined the league, thus giving the West the same five teams that compete in the modern CFL.

By the end of World War II, the WIFU had upgraded its quality of play to a level almost equal to that of the strongest Eastern union, the Interprovincial Rugby Football Union (Big Four). From 1945 onward, the WIFU champion regularly faced the Big Four champion for the Grey Cup. An important turning point came during the 1948 Grey Cup in which fans of the Western and eventual Grey Cup champion Stampeders brought pageantry to the event for the first time, with pancake breakfasts at Toronto City Hall, riding a horse through the lobby of the Royal York Hotel, and the first Grey Cup parade. This development proved decisive in turning the national football championship into big business, and the Big Four and WIFU quickly dropped all pretense of amateurism.

Despite this, the Big Four was reluctant to accept the WIFU as an equal. Well into the 1950s, long after the Big Four champion got an automatic berth to the Grey Cup, the WIFU champion was often obliged to play the champion of the Ontario Rugby Football Union — the only purely amateur union still playing for the title — in a Grey Cup semi-final. However, as the 1950s wore on, the ORFU found it increasingly difficult to compete in the new environment. The ORFU stopped challenging for the Grey Cup after the 1954 season, and the Grey Cup has been an East vs. West contest since. Although the amateurs would not be formally locked out of Grey Cup play for another four years, 1954 is usually viewed as the start of the modern era of Canadian football.

In 1956, these two leagues agreed to form the Canadian Football Council as an umbrella organization. In 1958, the CFC withdrew from the CRU and renamed itself the Canadian Football League. The new league also assumed control of the Grey Cup, though it had been the de facto professional championship of Canadian football for four years before then.

=== Western Football Conference (1961–1980) ===
The WIFU was officially renamed the Western Football Conference on February 8, 1961. However, it had become known informally as the Western Conference or Western Football Conference in the media for some years before then. Also in 1961, the WFC agreed to a partial interlocking schedule with what was by then known as the Eastern Football Conference. Although the WFC was part of the CFL, its merger with the EFC was only a partial merger for the next two decades. During this time, the conferences maintained considerable autonomy, much like the two Major League Baseball leagues operated in the 20th century. For example, the West had a different playoff format until 1973 and a longer schedule until 1974. During this time, attendances increased substantially for most clubs and television revenue gained prominence and importance. However, by the start of the 1980s rising player salaries had caused considerable financial losses for some teams. In an effort to bolster the league's stability, CFL clubs decided to proceed with a complete merger of the two regional conferences.

=== West Division (1981–1994, 1996–present) ===
In 1981, the CFL's two conferences agreed to a full merger and a full interlocking schedule. Although the WFC has carried on since that time as the CFL's West Division, full authority was now vested within the CFL itself. The decision to create a full interlocking schedule meant that the teams were playing fewer divisional games, consequently the league decided to add two extra divisional games per team, thus extending the schedule to the current 18 games per team starting in 1986.

The West Division has undergone major changes since the dissolution of the WFC. In 1987 an East Division team, the Montreal Alouettes, folded. Consequently, Winnipeg, the easternmost city in the West Division, was transferred to the East Division to keep the divisions equal in size. This led to the first "all-Western" Grey Cup in 1988 when the Blue Bombers won the East Division championship for the first time.

In 1993, the CFL decided to expand to the United States, leading to the addition of the league's first American-based team, the Sacramento Gold Miners. In 1994, the division added a sixth team, the Las Vegas Posse. Following the 1994 season, the Posse folded while the Gold Miners moved to San Antonio and became the Texans. For the 1995 season, all eight Canadian teams competed in the North Division, although the championship game was still an East–West affair as the Baltimore Stallions of the South Division defeated Calgary to become the only U.S. team to claim the Grey Cup.

Prior to the 1996 season, however, all of the American clubs disbanded, with the Stallions ownership establishing a revived Alouettes franchise in Montreal. The pre-1987 divisional alignment was restored, only to see Winnipeg return to the East after one season when the Ottawa Rough Riders folded. The Blue Bombers returned to the West in 2002 after an expansion franchise named the Renegades was granted in the nation's capital. With the suspension of the Ottawa Renegades for the 2006 season, the Blue Bombers moved back to the East. With the launch of the Ottawa Redblacks in 2014, the league briefly considered temporarily leaving Winnipeg in the East in an effort to keep the divisions relatively equal in strength, but the Blue Bombers successfully lobbied to be moved back to the West immediately.

=== Grey Cup record ===
Prior to 1954, Western clubs found limited success in the Grey Cup. Since 1954, however, the West has generally been on an equal footing and in recent decades has often dominated the East in the regular season. From 1954 to 2015, the West has won 35 Grey Cups and lost 26. This is not counting the 1995 season. Additionally two of the West's Grey Cup losses were to the Blue Bombers, who have played in the West for most of their history.

The West was particularly dominant from 1978 to 1989, winning all but three Cups in that period (Winnipeg, traditionally a West team, won as an East team in 1988).

== Playoff format ==
For most seasons since 1950, the top three teams in the West have made the playoffs. For many years, the semi-final and final was a two-game or even a best-of-three-game series, but this was abandoned in the 1970s in favour of a single-elimination format. Quite often a fourth-place team in the West had a better record than the third-place team in the East, with the West team out of the playoffs.

This was rectified beginning in 1986 when the CFL instituted a rule that permitted a fourth-place team in one division to make the playoffs provided it had more points in the standings than the third-place team in the other division. That year in the West the first-place Eskimos (13–4–1) defeated the fourth-place Stampeders (11–7–0) by a score of 27–18. The second-place Lions (12–6–0) defeated the third-place Blue Bombers (11–7–0) by a score of 21–14. The Eskimos then demolished the Lions in the West Final 41–5 and advanced to the Grey Cup. In the East the first-place Argonauts (10–8–0) played a two-game total point series against the second-place Tiger-Cats (9–8–1). The Argonauts won the first game 31–17, but the Tiger-Cats won the second game by a score of 42–25—and with it, a berth in the Grey Cup final. The Tiger-Cats, in their third consecutive Grey Cup game, were victorious over the Eskimos 39–15.

With the demise of the Montreal Alouettes on the eve of the 1987 season the playoff format reverted to the top three teams in the respective divisions making the playoffs (as it happened, no fourth place team achieved the league's sixth best record prior to U.S. expansion), while four teams qualified for the playoffs in 1993 and 1994. In 1997, the present cross-over rule was implemented, allowing the fourth-place team from one division to take the play-off place of the third-place team in the other division, should the fourth-place team earn a better record. From 1997 to 2016, the fourth place team in the West has taken advantage of the cross-over rule nine times, including four times when there were equal teams in the divisions. However, it was not until 2008 that a West team (Edmonton) advanced to the East Final, and only four other teams (the 2009 BC Lions, 2016 Eskimos, 2017 Saskatchewan Roughriders and 2019 Eskimos) have won a game since. Neither crossover team won more than one playoff game. As of 2022, no team from the East has crossed over into the West playoffs.

== List of Western champions ==
- Clubs in italics (starting with the inaugural season of the WIFU in 1936) finished in first place during the regular season.
- Clubs in **bold** won the Grey Cup (except where noted, all Western champions in the tables subsequently played in the Grey Cup championship game).

=== Champions of the Western Canada Rugby Football Union ===
Year	Champion	Runner-up
1911	Calgary Tigers (Note: Western champions were not allowed to play for the Grey Cup until 1921.)	Winnipeg Rowing Club
1912	Regina Rugby Club	Winnipeg Rowing Club
1913	Regina Rugby Club	Winnipeg Rowing Club
1914	Regina Rugby Club	Winnipeg Rowing Club
1915	Regina Rugby Club	Calgary Canucks
1916	No season: World War I	
1917	No season: World War I	
1918	No season: World War I	
1919	Regina Rugby Club	Calgary Canucks
1920	Regina Rugby Club	Calgary Tigers
1921	Edmonton Eskimos	Winnipeg Victorias
1922	Edmonton Elks	Winnipeg Victorias
1923	Regina Roughriders	Winnipeg Victorias
1924	Winnipeg Victorias (Note: Winnipeg did not challenge for the Grey Cup in 1923, and Regina did not challenge for the Grey Cup in 1926 and 1927.)	Calgary 50th Battalion
1925	Winnipeg Tammany Tigers	Regina Roughriders
1926	Regina Roughriders	University of Alberta
1927	Regina Roughriders	University of British Columbia
1928 (Note: For the 1928 season only, the top teams in Saskatchewan and Manitoba competed in the Tri-City Rugby Football League. Unusually for the era, the short-lived league held a championship game between the regular season winner and runner up, even though the teams were not tied for first place. The Albertan and British Columbian unions still had the right to challenge for the Western championship, but declined to do so, making the TCRFU championship game the de facto Western final.)	Regina Roughriders	St.John's Rugby Football Club
1929	Regina Roughriders	Calgary Tigers
1930	Regina Roughriders	Vancouver Meralomas
1931	Regina Roughriders	Calgary Altomahs-Tigers
1932	Regina Roughriders	Calgary Altomahs
1933	Winnipeg 'Pegs (Note: Winnipeg was defeated in the 1933 Grey Cup semi-final and did not advance to the championship game.)	Calgary Altomahs
1934	Regina Roughriders	Vancouver Meralomas
1935	**Winnipeg 'Pegs**	Calgary Bronks

=== Champions of the Western Interprovincial Football Union ===
Year	Champion	Runner-up
1936	Regina Roughriders (Note: Regina and Winnipeg were disqualified from 1936 and 1940 Grey Cup games respectively due to rules disputes with the CRU.)	Winnipeg Blue Bombers (Note: After Regina won the inaugural WIFU playoffs, they were subsequently challenged under WCRFU rules for the Western championship by Calgary, which had finished last in the WIFU but nevertheless won the ARFU title with their "B" side. Regina accepted the challenge and subsequently defeated Calgary, thus becoming the undisputed Western champion, but creating some uncertainly as to whether Winnipeg or Calgary should be considered Western runners-up.)
1937	Winnipeg Blue Bombers	Calgary Bronks
1938	Winnipeg Blue Bombers	Calgary Bronks
1939	**Winnipeg Blue Bombers**	Calgary Bronks
1940	Winnipeg Blue Bombers	Calgary Bronks
1941	**Winnipeg Blue Bombers**	Regina Roughriders
1942	No season: World War II (Note: Military teams competed for the Grey Cup in 1942, 1943 and 1944. The Winnipeg RCAF Bombers, which fielded several players formerly on the Blue Bombers roster, played in and lost the Grey Cup games in 1942 and 1943.)	
1943	No season: World War II	
1944	No season: World War II	
1945 (Note: No regular season was played in 1945.)	Winnipeg Blue Bombers	Calgary Stampeders
1946	Winnipeg Blue Bombers	Calgary Stampeders
1947	Winnipeg Blue Bombers	Calgary Stampeders
1948	**Calgary Stampeders**	Saskatchewan Roughriders
1949	Calgary Stampeders	Saskatchewan Roughriders
1950	Winnipeg Blue Bombers	Edmonton Eskimos
1951	Saskatchewan Roughriders	Edmonton Eskimos
1952	Edmonton Eskimos	Winnipeg Blue Bombers
1953	Winnipeg Blue Bombers	Edmonton Eskimos
1954	**Edmonton Eskimos**	Winnipeg Blue Bombers
1955	**Edmonton Eskimos**	Winnipeg Blue Bombers
1956	**Edmonton Eskimos**	Saskatchewan Roughriders
1957	Winnipeg Blue Bombers	Edmonton Eskimos
1958	**Winnipeg Blue Bombers**	Edmonton Eskimos
1959	**Winnipeg Blue Bombers**	Edmonton Eskimos
1960	Edmonton Eskimos	Winnipeg Blue Bombers

=== Champions of the Western Football Conference ===
Year	Champion	Runner-up
1961	**Winnipeg Blue Bombers**	Calgary Stampeders
1962	**Winnipeg Blue Bombers**	Calgary Stampeders
1963	BC Lions	Saskatchewan Roughriders
1964	**BC Lions**	Calgary Stampeders
1965	Winnipeg Blue Bombers	Calgary Stampeders
1966	**Saskatchewan Roughriders**	Winnipeg Blue Bombers
1967	Saskatchewan Roughriders	Calgary Stampeders
1968	Calgary Stampeders	Saskatchewan Roughriders
1969	Saskatchewan Roughriders	Calgary Stampeders
1970	Calgary Stampeders	Saskatchewan Roughriders
1971	**Calgary Stampeders**	Saskatchewan Roughriders
1972	Saskatchewan Roughriders	Winnipeg Blue Bombers
1973	Edmonton Eskimos	Saskatchewan Roughriders
1974	Edmonton Eskimos	Saskatchewan Roughriders
1975	**Edmonton Eskimos**	Saskatchewan Roughriders
1976	Saskatchewan Roughriders	Edmonton Eskimos
1977	Edmonton Eskimos	BC Lions
1978	**Edmonton Eskimos**	Calgary Stampeders
1979	**Edmonton Eskimos**	Calgary Stampeders
1980	**Edmonton Eskimos**	Winnipeg Blue Bombers

=== Champions of the West Division ===
Year	Champion	Runner-up
1981	**Edmonton Eskimos**	BC Lions
1982	**Edmonton Eskimos**	Winnipeg Blue Bombers
1983	BC Lions	Winnipeg Blue Bombers
1984	**Winnipeg Blue Bombers**	BC Lions
1985	**BC Lions**	Winnipeg Blue Bombers
1986	Edmonton Eskimos (Note: Under the modern playoff format in which three teams have usually competed in the playoff bracket for each division, the first place teams in each division automatically host the division finals. However, four teams qualified for the Western playoff bracket under the modified format used in 1986, and again during the U.S. expansion era in 1993 and 1994. Four teams also contested the North Division playoff bracket in 1995, the final year of the U.S. expansion era. In each of these playoffs, the first place team defeated the fourth place team in the semi-final to advance to the division final.)	BC Lions
1987	**Edmonton Eskimos**	BC Lions
1988 (Note: Winnipeg won two Grey Cups (in 1988 and 1990) while in the East Division.)	BC Lions	Edmonton Eskimos
1989	**Saskatchewan Roughriders**	Edmonton Eskimos
1990	Edmonton Eskimos	Calgary Stampeders
1991	Calgary Stampeders	Edmonton Eskimos
1992	**Calgary Stampeders**	Edmonton Eskimos
1993	**Edmonton Eskimos**	Calgary Stampeders
1994	**BC Lions**	Calgary Stampeders
1995	Calgary Stampeders	Edmonton Eskimos
1996	Edmonton Eskimos	Calgary Stampeders
1997	Saskatchewan Roughriders	Edmonton Eskimos
1998	**Calgary Stampeders**	Edmonton Eskimos
1999	Calgary Stampeders	BC Lions
2000	**BC Lions**	Calgary Stampeders
2001	**Calgary Stampeders**	Edmonton Eskimos
2002	Edmonton Eskimos	Winnipeg Blue Bombers
2003	**Edmonton Eskimos**	Saskatchewan Roughriders
2004	BC Lions	Saskatchewan Roughriders
2005	**Edmonton Eskimos**	BC Lions
2006	**BC Lions**	Saskatchewan Roughriders
2007	**Saskatchewan Roughriders**	BC Lions
2008	**Calgary Stampeders**	BC Lions
2009	Saskatchewan Roughriders	Calgary Stampeders
2010	Saskatchewan Roughriders	Calgary Stampeders
2011	**BC Lions**	Edmonton Eskimos
2012	Calgary Stampeders	BC Lions
2013	**Saskatchewan Roughriders**	Calgary Stampeders
2014	**Calgary Stampeders**	Edmonton Eskimos
2015	**Edmonton Eskimos**	Calgary Stampeders
2016	Calgary Stampeders	BC Lions
2017	Calgary Stampeders	Edmonton Eskimos
2018	**Calgary Stampeders**	Winnipeg Blue Bombers
2019	**Winnipeg Blue Bombers**	Saskatchewan Roughriders
2020	No season: COVID-19 pandemic	
2021	**Winnipeg Blue Bombers**	Saskatchewan Roughriders
2022	Winnipeg Blue Bombers	BC Lions
2023	Winnipeg Blue Bombers	BC Lions
2024	Winnipeg Blue Bombers	Saskatchewan Roughriders
2025	**Saskatchewan Roughriders**	BC Lions

== Total playoff berths while in the CFL West ==
This reflects Winnipeg Blue Bombers results only while in the West Division since its creation in 1930. The Sacramento Gold Miners played in the division from 1993–1994 and the Las Vegas Posse played in the division in 1994.

Team	Division titles	Playoff berths	West Division championships	Grey Cup championships
Edmonton Elks	23	56	23	14
Calgary Stampeders	22	60	17	8
Saskatchewan Roughriders	9	52	13	5
Winnipeg Blue Bombers (Note: Played in the West Division from 1930 to 1986, 1996, 2002 to 2005, and 2014 to present.)	16	47	20	9
BC Lions	13	43	10	6
Sacramento Gold Miners	0	0	0	0
Las Vegas Posse	0	0	0	0
