= List of Winnipeg Blue Bombers seasons =

List of Canadian football team seasons

This is a complete list of seasons competed by the Winnipeg Blue Bombers, a Canadian Football League team. While the team was founded in 1930, they did not join the CFL until it was founded in 1958. Throughout their history, the Blue Bombers have won 12 Grey Cups. They are also the only team in the West Division to have faced off with their fellow West opponents in a Grey Cup, beating BC and Edmonton.

Grey Cup Championships†	West/East Championships*	Regular season championships^

League Season	Team Season	League	Division	Finish	Wins	Losses	Ties	Playoffs
Winnipegs
1930	1930	MRFU	–	2nd	0	4	0	
1931	1931	MRFU*	–	2nd	1	3	0	
1932	1932	MRFU*	–	2nd	2	3	1	
1933	1933	MRFU*	–	1st^	2	0	0	Won Western Semi-Final (Roughriders) 11-1; Won Western Title Game (Altomahs) 15-1; Lost Grey Cup Semi-Final (Argonauts) 13–0
1934	1934	MRFU	–	1st^	2	0	0	Lost Western Semi-Final (Roughriders) 8-0
1935	1935	MRFU†*	–	1st^	3	0	0	Won Western Semi-Final (Roughriders) 13-6; Won Western Title Game (Bronks) 7-0; Won Grey Cup (Tigers) 18-12†
1936	1936	WIFU	–	1st^	5	2	1	Lost W.I.F.U. Semi-Finals (Roughriders) 1–1 series (24-12 points)
Winnipeg Blue Bombers
1937	1937	WIFU*	–	2nd	4	4	0	Won W.I.F.U. Finals (Bronks) 1–1 series (19-14 points); Lost Grey Cup (Argonauts) 4-3
1938	1938	WIFU*	–	2nd	6	2	0	Won W.I.F.U. Semi-Finals (Roughriders) 13-0; Won W.I.F.U. Finals (Bronks) 2–0 series (25-9 points); Lost Grey Cup (Argonauts) 30-7
1939	1939	WIFU†*	–	1st^	10	2	0	Won W.I.F.U. Finals (Bronks) 1–1 series (35-20 points); Won Grey Cup (Rough Riders) 8-7†
1940	1940	WIFU*	–	1st^	6	2	0	Won W.I.F.U. Finals (Bronks) 2–0 series (30-2 points); Were refused to enter Grey Cup game by the Canadian Rugby Union.
1941	1941	WIFU†*	–	1st^	6	2	0	Won W.I.F.U. Finals (Roughriders) 2–1 series (32-22 points); Won Grey Cup (Rough Riders) 18-16†
1942	1942	season cancelled (World War II)						
1943	1943	season cancelled (World War II)						
1944	1944	season cancelled (World War II)						
1945	1945	WIFU*	–	No season play				Won W.I.F.U. Finals (Stampeders) 9-6; Lost Grey Cup (Argonauts) 35-0
1946	1946	WIFU*	–	2nd	5	3	0	Won W.I.F.U. Finals (Stampeders) 1–1 series (30-21 points); Lost Grey Cup (Argonauts) 28-5
1947	1947	WIFU*	–	1st^	5	3	0	Won W.I.F.U. Finals (Stampeders) 2–1 series (29-22 points); Lost Grey Cup (Argonauts) 10-9
1948	1948	WIFU	–	3rd	3	9	0	
1949	1949	WIFU	–	4th	2	12	0	
1950	1950	WIFU*	–	1st^	10	4	0	Won W.I.F.U. Finals (Eskimos) 2–1 series (67-35 points); Lost Grey Cup (Argonauts) 13-0
1951	1951	WIFU	–	3rd	8	6	0	Lost W.I.F.U. Semi-Final (Eskimos) 4-1
1952	1952	WIFU	–	1st^	12	3	1	Lost W.I.F.U. Finals (Eskimos) 1–2 series (51–52 points)
1953	1953	WIFU*	–	3rd	8	8	0	Won W.I.F.U. Semi-Finals (Roughriders) 1–1 series (60-23 points); Won W.I.F.U. Finals (Eskimos) 2–1 series (58–66 points); Won Grey Cup Semi-Final (Balmy Beach Beachers) 24-4; Lost Grey Cup (Tiger-Cats) 12-6
1954	1954	WIFU	–	3rd	8	6	2	Won W.I.F.U. Semi-Finals (Roughriders) 1-0-1 series (27-25 points); Lost W.I.F.U. Finals (Eskimos) 1–2 series (20–25 points)
1955	1955	WIFU	–	3rd	7	9	0	Won W.I.F.U. Semi-Finals (Roughriders) 1–1 series (24-16 points); Lost W.I.F.U. Finals (Eskimos) 0–2 series (12–55 points)
1956	1956	WIFU	–	3rd	9	7	0	Lost W.I.F.U. Semi-Finals (Roughriders) 1–1 series (26–50 points)
1957	1957	WIFU*	–	2nd	12	4	0	Won W.I.F.U. Semi-Finals (Stampeders) 1-0-1 series (28-16 points); Won W.I.F.U. Finals (Eskimos) 2–1 series (40-14 points); Lost Grey Cup (Tiger-Cats) 32-7
1958	1958	CFL†	W.I.F.U.*	1st^	13	3	0	Won W.I.F.U. Finals (Eskimos) 2–1 series (60-44 points); Won Grey Cup (Tiger-Cats) 35-28†
1959	1959	CFL†	W.I.F.U.*	1st^	12	4	0	Won West Finals (Eskimos) 2–0 series (35-19 points); Won Grey Cup (Tiger-Cats) 21-7†
1960	1960	CFL	W.I.F.U.	1st^	14	2	0	Lost West Finals (Eskimos) 1–2 series (29–30 points)
1961	1961	CFL†	West*	1st^	13	3	0	Won West Finals (Stampeders) 2–0 series (57-15 points); Won Grey Cup (Tiger-Cats) 21-14†
1962	1962	CFL†	West*	1st^	11	5	0	Won West Finals (Stampeders) 2–1 series (45-38 points); Won Grey Cup (Tiger-Cats) 28-27†
1963	1963	CFL	West	4th	7	9	0	
1964	1964	CFL	West	5th	1	14	1	
1965	1965	CFL	West*	2nd	11	5	0	Won West Semi-Final (Roughriders) 15-9; Won West Final (Stampeders) 2–1 series (43–50 points); Lost Grey Cup (Tiger-Cats) 22-16
1966	1966	CFL	West	2nd	8	7	1	Won West Semi-Final (Eskimos) 16-8; Lost West Final (Roughriders) 0–2 series (26–35 points)
1967	1967	CFL	West	4th	4	12	0	
1968	1968	CFL	West	5th	3	13	0	
1969	1969	CFL	West	5th	3	12	1	
1970	1970	CFL	West	5th	2	14	0	
1971	1971	CFL	West	3rd	7	8	1	Lost West Semi-Final (Roughriders) 34-23
1972	1972	CFL	West	1st^	10	6	0	Lost West Finals (Roughriders) 27-24
1973	1973	CFL	West	5th	4	11	1	
1974	1974	CFL	West	4th	8	8	0	
1975	1975	CFL	West	3rd	6	8	2	Lost West Semi-Final (Roughriders) 42-24
1976	1976	CFL	West	2nd	10	6	0	Lost West Semi-Final (Eskimos) 14-12
1977	1977	CFL	West	3rd	10	6	0	Lost West Semi-Final (Lions) 33-32
1978	1978	CFL	West	3rd	9	7	0	Lost West Semi-Final (Stampeders) 38-4
1979	1979	CFL	West	4th	4	12	0	
1980	1980	CFL	West	2nd	10	6	0	Won West Semi-Final (Stampeders) 32-14; Lost West Final (Eskimos) 34-24
1981	1981	CFL	West	2nd	11	5	0	Lost West Semi-Final (Lions) 15-11
1982	1982	CFL	West	2nd	11	5	0	Won West Semi-Final (Stampeders) 24-3; Lost West Final (Eskimos) 24-21
1983	1983	CFL	West	2nd	9	7	0	Won West Semi-Final (Eskimos) 49-22; Lost West Final (Lions) 39-21
1984	1984	CFL†	West*	2nd	11	4	1	Won West Semi-Final (Eskimos) 55-20; Won West Final (Lions) 31-14; Won Grey Cup (Tiger-Cats) 47-17†
1985	1985	CFL	West	2nd	12	4	0	Won West Semi-Final (Eskimos) 22-15; Lost West Final (Lions) 42-22
1986	1986	CFL	West	3rd	11	7	0	Lost West Semi-Final (Lions) 21-14
1987	1987	CFL	East	1st^	12	6	0	Lost East Final (Argonauts) 19-3
1988	1988	CFL†	East*	2nd	9	9	0	Won East Semi-Final (Tiger-Cats) 35-28; Won East Final (Argonauts) 27-11; Won Grey Cup (Lions) 22-21†
1989	1989	CFL	East	3rd	7	11	0	Won East Semi-Final (Argonauts) 30-7; Lost East Final (Tiger-Cats) 14-10
1990	1990	CFL†	East*	1st^	12	6	0	Won East Final (Argonauts) 20-17; Won Grey Cup (Eskimos) 50-11†
1991	1991	CFL	East	2nd	9	9	0	Won East Semi-Final (Rough Riders) 26-8; Lost East Final (Argonauts) 42-3
1992	1992	CFL	East*	1st^	11	7	0	Won East Final (Tiger-Cats) 59-11; Lost Grey Cup (Stampeders) 24-10
1993	1993	CFL	East*	1st^	14	4	0	Won East Final (Tiger-Cats) 20-19; Lost Grey Cup (Eskimos) 33-23
1994	1994	CFL	East	1st^	13	5	0	Won East Semi-Final (Rough Riders) 26-16; Lost East Final (Baltimore CFLers) 14-12
1995	1995	CFL	North	5th	7	11	0	Lost South Semi-Final (Stallions) 36-21
1996	1996	CFL	West	3rd	9	9	0	Lost West Semi-Final (Eskimos) 68-7
1997	1997	CFL	East	3rd	4	14	0	
1998	1998	CFL	East	4th	3	15	0	
1999	1999	CFL	East	4th	6	12	0	
2000	2000	CFL	East	3rd	7	10	1	Won East Semi-Final (Tiger-Cats) 22-20; Lost East Final (Alouettes) 35-24
2001	2001	CFL	East*	1st^	14	4	0	Won East Final (Tiger-Cats) 28-13; Lost Grey Cup (Stampeders) 27-19
2002	2002	CFL	West	2nd	12	6	0	Won West Semi-Final (Lions) 30-3; Lost West Final (Eskimos) 33-30
2003	2003	CFL	West	2nd	11	7	0	Lost West Semi-Final (Roughriders) 37-21
2004	2004	CFL	West	4th	7	11	0	
2005	2005	CFL	West	5th	5	13	0	
2006	2006	CFL	East	3rd	9	9	0	Lost East Semi-Final (Argonauts) 31-27
2007	2007	CFL	East*	2nd	10	7	1	Won East Semi-Final (Alouettes) 24-22; Won East Final (Argonauts) 19-9; Lost Grey Cup (Roughriders) 23-19
2008	2008	CFL	East	2nd	8	10	0	Lost East Semi-Final (Eskimos) 29-21
2009	2009	CFL	East	3rd	7	11	0	
2010	2010	CFL	East	4th	4	14	0	
2011	2011	CFL	East*	1st^	10	8	0	Won East Final (Tiger-Cats) 19-3; Lost Grey Cup (Lions) 34-23
2012	2012	CFL	East	3rd	6	12	0	
2013	2013	CFL	East	4th	3	15	0	
2014	2014	CFL	West	5th	7	11	0	
2015	2015	CFL	West	4th	5	13	0	
2016	2016	CFL	West	3rd	11	7	0	Lost West Semi-Final (Lions) 32-31
2017	2017	CFL	West	2nd	12	6	0	Lost West Semi-Final (Eskimos) 39-32
2018	2018	CFL	West	3rd	10	8	0	Won West Semi-Final (Roughriders) 23-18; Lost West Final (Stampeders) 22-14
2019	2019	CFL†	West*	3rd	11	7	0	Won West Semi-Final (Stampeders) 35-14; Won West Final (Roughriders) 20-13; Won Grey Cup (Tiger-Cats) 33-12
2020	2020	CFL	West	Season cancelled due to the COVID-19 pandemic				
2021	2021	CFL†	West*	1st^	11	3	0	Won West Final (Roughriders) 21-17; Won Grey Cup (Tiger-Cats) 33-25
2022	2022	CFL	West*	1st^	15	3	0	Won West Final (Lions) 28-20; Lost Grey Cup (Argonauts) 24-23
2023	2023	CFL	West*	1st^	14	4	0	Won West Final (Lions) 24-13; Lost Grey Cup (Alouettes) 28-24
2024	2024	CFL	West*	1st^	11	7	0	Won West Final (Roughriders) 38-22; Lost Grey Cup (Argonauts) 41-24
2025	2025	CFL	West	4th	10	8	0	Lost East Semi-Final (Alouettes) 42-33
2026	2026	CFL	West	4th	9	9	0	Won East Semi-Final (Argonauts) 25-22; Lost East Final (Alouettes) 33-23
Regular season Totals (1930–2026)					732	652	15	
Playoff Totals (1930–2026)					74	56	2	
Grey Cup Totals (1930–2026)					12	17		
