= List of Calgary Bronks (football) seasons =

This is a complete list of seasons competed by the Calgary Bronks, a Canadian football team. The team was founded in 1935 of the Alberta Rugby Football Union. They joined the Western Interprovincial Football Union, in 1936. They suspended operations in 1941.

Grey Cup Championships †	West Division Championships *	Regular season championships ^

League season	Club season	League	Division	Finish	Wins	Losses	Ties	Playoffs
Calgary Bronks
1935	1935	ARFU	–	1st^	2	0	0	Won Alberta Rugby Football Union championship Won Western Semi-Final (Meralomas) 14-0; Lost Western Title Game (Winnipegs) 7-0
1936	1936	ARFU	–	1st^	6	2	0	"B" side - Won Alberta Rugby Football Union championship Won W.I.F.U Semi-Finals (Vancouver Athletic Club) Forfeit; Lost W.I.F.U Finals (Roughriders) 8-1
1936	1936	WIFU	–	3rd	1	5	0	
1937	1937	WIFU	–	1st^	5	3	0	Lost W.I.F.U Finals (Blue Bombers) 19-14
1938	1938	WIFU	–	1st^	6	2	0	Lost W.I.F.U. Finals (Blue Bombers) 0-2 series
1939	1939	WIFU	–	3rd	4	7	0	Won W.I.F.U. Semi-Final (Roughriders) 24-17; Lost W.I.F.U. Finals (Blue Bombers) 1-1 series
1940	1940	WIFU	–	2nd	4	4	0	Lost W.I.F.U. Finals (Blue Bombers) 0-2 series
1941	1941	did not participate						
1942	1942	season cancelled (World War II)						
1943	1943	season cancelled (World War II)						
1944	1944	season cancelled (World War II)						

== See also ==
- Alberta Rugby Football Union champions
