= 1940 in Canadian football =

The only two-game total point series in Grey Cup history was played between the Ottawa Rough Riders and the Toronto Balmy Beach Beachers. It was Ottawa's first Grey Cup championship since the Senators won back-to-back titles in 1925 and 1926. It was Balmy Beach's fourth and final appearance at a Grey Cup, winning two times in four opportunities.

The Canadian Rugby Union arranged the series after it refused to allow the WIFU winners, the Winnipeg Blue Bombers to compete in the final. The reason for the refusal was based on the WIFU season being played under rules that varied from IRFU rules.

== Regular season ==
=== Final regular season standings ===
Note: GP = Games played, W = Wins, L = Losses, T = Ties, PF = Points for, PA = Points against, Pts = Points

**Western Interprovincial Football Union**
Team	GP	W	L	T	PF	PA	Pts
**Winnipeg Blue Bombers**	8	6	2	0	108	58	12
**Calgary Bronks**	8	4	4	0	79	76	8
Regina Roughriders	8	2	6	0	39	92	4

**Interprovincial Rugby Football Union**
Team	GP	W	L	T	PF	PA	Pts
**Ottawa Rough Riders**	6	5	1	0	116	40	10
**Toronto Argonauts**	6	4	2	0	58	79	8
Hamilton Tigers	6	2	4	0	45	73	4
Montreal Football Club (Bulldogs)	6	1	5	0	39	66	2

Ontario Rugby Football Union
Team	GP	W	L	T	PF	PA	Pts
**Toronto Balmy Beach**	6	6	0	0	75	12	12
**Sarnia 2/26 Battery**	6	4	2	0	59	36	8
Hamilton Alerts	5	1	4	0	16	49	2
Camp Borden	5	0	5	0	7	60	0

*Bold text means that they had clinched the playoffs.

A tie game between the Hamilton Alerts and Camp Borden was ordered to be replayed but was cancelled.

BCRFU - Three V League
Team	GP	W	L	T	PF	PA	Pts
**Victoria Revellers**	4	4	0	0	44	14	8
University of British Columbia Thunderbirds	4	1	3	0	25	42	2
Vancouver Bulldogs	4	1	3	0	14	27	2

== Grey Cup playoffs ==
Note: All dates in 1940

=== Division finals ===
WIFU Finals – Game 1
Winnipeg Blue Bombers @ Calgary Bronks
Date	Away	Home
November 2	Winnipeg Blue Bombers 7	Calgary Bronks 0

WIFU Finals – Game 2
Calgary Bronks @ Winnipeg Blue Bombers
Date	Away	Home
November 9	Calgary Bronks 2	Winnipeg Blue Bombers 23

- Winnipeg won the total-point series by 30–2. Winnipeg would have advanced to the Grey Cup game, but were refused by the Canadian Rugby Union. They instead went to the United States at the beginning of the 1941 season to play the Columbus Bullies, the champions of the American Football League, in a three-game series. The Bullies defeated the Blue Bombers 2 games to 1, with scores of 12–19, 6–0, and 31–1.

ORFU Finals – Game 1
Sarnia 2/26 Battery @ Toronto Balmy Beach
Date	Away	Home
November 16	Sarnia 2/26 Battery 0	Toronto Balmy Beach 12

ORFU Finals – Game 2
Toronto Balmy Beach @ Sarnia 2/26 Battery
Date	Away	Home
November 23	Toronto Balmy Beach 24	Sarnia 2/26 Battery 0

- Toronto Balmy Beach won the total-point series by 36–0.

IRFU Finals – Game 1
Toronto Argonauts @ Ottawa Rough Riders
Date	Away	Home
November 16	Toronto Argonauts 1	Ottawa Rough Riders 12

IRFU Finals – Game 2
Ottawa Rough Riders @ Toronto Argonauts
Date	Away	Home
November 23	Ottawa Rough Riders 8	Toronto Argonauts 1

- Ottawa won the total-point series by 20–2. Ottawa will play Toronto Balmy Beach (ORFU Champions) in the Grey Cup game.

== Grey Cup Championship ==
November 30 28th Annual Grey Cup Game – Game 1: Varsity Stadium – Toronto, Ontario
Ottawa Rough Riders @ Toronto Balmy Beach Beachers (ORFU)
Away	Home
Ottawa Rough Riders 8	Toronto Balmy Beach Beachers (ORFU) 2

December 7 28th Annual Grey Cup Game – Game 2: Lansdowne Park – Ottawa, Ontario
Toronto Balmy Beach Beachers (ORFU) @ Ottawa Rough Riders
Away	Home
Toronto Balmy Beach Beachers (ORFU) 5	Ottawa Rough Riders 12
Ottawa won the total-point series by 20–7. The Ottawa Rough Riders are the 1940 Grey Cup Champions

== 1940 Interprovincial Rugby Football Union All-Stars ==
Note: During this time most players played both ways, so the All-Star selections do not distinguish between some offensive and defensive positions.

- QB – Bobby Coulter, Toronto Argonauts
- FW – Andy Tommy, Ottawa Rough Riders
- HB – Tony Golab, Ottawa Rough Riders
- HB – Gordon Noseworthy, Montreal Bulldogs
- HB – Sammy Sward, Ottawa Rough Riders
- E – Eddie Burton, Montreal Bulldogs
- E – Bernie Thornton, Toronto Argonauts
- C – Doug Turner, Hamilton Tigers
- G – George Fraser, Ottawa Rough Riders
- G – Len Staughton, Ottawa Rough Riders
- T – Bunny Wadsworth, Ottawa Rough Riders
- T – Dave Sprague, Ottawa Rough Riders

== 1940 Western Interprovincial Football Union All-Stars ==
Note: During this time most players played both ways, so the All-Star selections do not distinguish between some offensive and defensive positions.

- QB – Greg Kabat, Winnipeg Blue Bombers
- FW – Jeff Nicklin, Winnipeg Blue Bombers
- HB – Fritz Hanson, Winnipeg Blue Bombers
- HB – Art Stevenson, Winnipeg Blue Bombers
- FB – Raul Rowe, Calgary Bronks
- E – Larry Haynes, Calgary Bronks
- E – Ches McCance, Winnipeg Blue Bombers
- E – Bud Marquardt, Winnipeg Blue Bombers
- C – Dean Griffing, Regina Roughriders
- G – Maurice Williams, Regina Roughriders
- G – Bill Ceretti, Winnipeg Blue Bombers
- T – Gord Gellhaye, Calgary Bronks
- T – Toar Springstein, Regina Roughriders

== 1940 Ontario Rugby Football Union All-Stars ==
Note: During this time most players played both ways, so the All-Star selections do not distinguish between some offensive and defensive positions.

- QB – Bobby Porter, Toronto Balmy Beach Beachers
- FW – Ralph Perry, Sarnia Imperials
- HB – Don Crowe, Toronto Balmy Beach Beachers
- HB – Eddie Thompson, Camp Borden
- DB – Frank Seymour, Toronto Balmy Beach Beachers
- E – Jim Butler, Sarnia 2/26 Battery
- E – Syd Reynolds, Toronto Balmy Beach Beachers
- C – Nick Paithouski, Sarnia 2/26 Battery
- G – Bob Reid, Toronto Balmy Beach Beachers
- G – Bruce Barron, Toronto Balmy Beach Beachers
- T – Gord Shields, Toronto Balmy Beach Beachers
- T – Dick Norris, Sarnia 2/26 Battery

== 1940 Canadian football awards ==
- Jeff Russel Memorial Trophy (IRFU MVP) – Andy Tommy (FW), Ottawa Rough Riders
- Imperial Oil Trophy (ORFU MVP) - Nick Paithouski - Sarnia 2/26 Battery
