= List of Calgary Stampeders head coaches =

The Calgary Stampeders are a professional Canadian football team based in Calgary, Alberta, and are members of the West Division in the Canadian Football League (CFL).

The Stampeders were founded in 1935 (as the Calgary Bronks), although the team was inactive from 1941 to 1944.

== Key ==
General
| # | Number of coaches^{[a]} |
| † | Elected to the Canadian Football Hall of Fame in the builders category |
| Achievements | Achievements during their Calgary head coaching tenure |

Regular season
| GC | Games coached | T | Ties = 1 point |
| W | Wins = 2 points | PTS | Points |
| L | Losses = 0 points | Win% | Winning percentage^{[b]} |

Playoffs and Grey Cup
| PGC | Games coached |
| PW | Wins |
| PL | Losses |
| PT | Ties |
| PWin% | Winning percentage |

== Head coaches ==
Note: Statistics are current through the end of the 2026 CFL season.

| # | Name | Term^{[b]} | GC | W | L | T | PTS | Win% | PGC | PW | PL | PT | PWin% | Achievements |
|---|---|---|---|---|---|---|---|---|---|---|---|---|---|---|
| 1 | Carl Cronin | 1935–1938 | 24 | 14 | 10 | 0 | 28 | .583 | 7 | 2 | 5 | 0 | .286 | |
| 2 | Dick Haughian | 1939 | 11 | 4 | 7 | 0 | 8 | .364 | 3 | 2 | 1 | 0 | .667 | |
| 3 | Larry Haynes | 1940 | 8 | 4 | 4 | 0 | 8 | .500 | 2 | 0 | 2 | 0 | .000 | |
| 4 | Dean Griffing† | 1945–1947 | 16 | 9 | 7 | 0 | 18 | .562 | 8 | 4 | 4 | 0 | .500 | |
| 5 | Les Lear | 1948–1952 | 70 | 40 | 30 | 0 | 80 | .571 | 8 | 4 | 3 | 1 | .571 | 32nd Grey Cup championship |
| 6 | Bob Snyder | 1953 | 16 | 3 | 12 | 1 | 6 | .200 | – | – | – | – | – | |
| 7 | Larry Siemering | 1954 | 16 | 8 | 8 | 0 | 16 | .500 | – | – | – | – | – | |
| 8 | Jack Hennemier | 1955–1956 | 25 | 6 | 19 | 0 | 12 | .240 | – | – | – | – | – | |
| 9 | Otis Douglas | 1957–1960 | 51 | 20 | 29 | 2 | 42 | .412 | 2 | 0 | 1 | 1 | .000 | |
| 10 | Jim Finks | 1960 | 1 | 0 | 1 | 0 | 0 | .000 | – | – | – | – | – | |
| 11 | Steve Owen | 1960 | 12 | 6 | 5 | 1 | 13 | .542 | 2 | 0 | 2 | 0 | .000 | |
| 12 | Bobby Dobbs | 1961–1964 | 64 | 38 | 23 | 3 | 79 | .622 | 16 | 7 | 9 | 0 | .437 | |
| 13 | Jerry Williams | 1965–1968 | 64 | 40 | 23 | 1 | 81 | .634 | 10 | 5 | 5 | 0 | .500 | 1967 Annis Stukus Trophy winner |
| 14 | Jim Duncan | 1969–1973 | 77 | 38 | 38 | 1 | 77 | .500 | 11 | 7 | 4 | 0 | .636 | 59th Grey Cup championship |
| 15 | Jim Wood | 1973–1975 | 29 | 10 | 19 | 0 | 20 | .344 | – | – | – | – | – | |
| 16 | Bob Baker | 1975–1976 | 16 | 3 | 12 | 1 | 7 | .200 | – | – | – | – | – | |
| 17 | Joe Tiller | 1976 | 6 | 2 | 3 | 1 | 4 | .400 | – | – | – | – | – | |
| 18 | Jack Gotta | 1977–1979 | 48 | 25 | 20 | 3 | 53 | .555 | 4 | 2 | 2 | 0 | .500 | 1978 Annis Stukus Trophy winner |
| 19 | Ardell Wiegandt | 1980–1981 | 28 | 14 | 14 | 0 | 28 | .500 | 1 | 0 | 1 | 0 | .000 | |
| — | Jerry Williams | 1981 | 4 | 1 | 3 | 0 | 2 | .250 | – | – | – | – | – | |
| — | Jack Gotta | 1982–1983 | 32 | 17 | 14 | 1 | 35 | .531 | 1 | 0 | 1 | 0 | .000 | |
| 20 | Steve Buratto | 1984–1985 | 21 | 6 | 15 | 0 | 12 | .285 | – | – | – | – | – | |
| 21 | Bud Riley | 1985 | 11 | 3 | 8 | 0 | 6 | .272 | – | – | – | – | – | |
| 22 | Bob Vespaziani | 1986–1987 | 26 | 13 | 13 | 0 | 26 | .500 | 1 | 0 | 1 | 0 | .000 | |
| 23 | Lary Kuharich | 1987–1989 | 46 | 24 | 22 | 0 | 48 | .521 | 2 | 0 | 2 | 0 | .000 | |
| 24 | Wally Buono† | 1990–2002 | 234 | 153 | 79 | 2 | 306 | .659 | 24 | 15 | 9 | 0 | .625 | 1992 Annis Stukus Trophy winner 1993 Annis Stukus Trophy winner 80th Grey Cup championship 86th Grey Cup championship 89th Grey Cup championship |
| 25 | Jim Barker | 2003 | 18 | 5 | 13 | 0 | 10 | .277 | – | – | – | – | – | |
| 26 | Matt Dunigan | 2004 | 18 | 4 | 14 | 0 | 8 | .222 | – | – | – | – | – | |
| 27 | Tom Higgins | 2005–2007 | 54 | 28 | 25 | 1 | 53 | .528 | 3 | 0 | 3 | 0 | .000 | 2005 Annis Stukus Trophy winner |
| 28 | John Hufnagel† | 2008–2015 | 144 | 102 | 41 | 1 | 205 | .712 | 14 | 8 | 6 | 0 | .571 | 2008 Annis Stukus Trophy winner 96th Grey Cup championship 102nd Grey Cup championship |
| 29 | Dave Dickenson | 2016–present | 158 | 104 | 69 | 3 | 211 | .599 | 11 | 4 | 7 | 0 | .364 | 2016 Annis Stukus Trophy winner 106th Grey Cup championship |

== Notes ==
- ^{a} A running total of the number of coaches of the Stampeders. Thus, any coach who has two or more separate terms as head coach is only counted once.
- ^{b} Each year is linked to an article about that particular CFL season.
