= 1941 Winnipeg Blue Bombers season =

Canadian football team season

- General manager: Joe Ryan
- President: Frank Hannibal
- Head coach: Reg Threlfall
- Home stadium: Osborne Stadium

Results
- Record: 6–2
- Division place: 1st, WIFU
- Playoffs: Won Grey Cup

The 1941 Winnipeg Blue Bombers was the 12th season in franchise history. They finished in first place in the WIFU with a 6–2 record. The Blue Bombers won their third Grey Cup championship by defeating the Ottawa Rough Riders 18–16. This would be the last official Blue Bomber season until 1945 due to the suspension of operations of both the Interprovincial Rugby Football Union and the Western Interprovincial Football Union because of World War II; star halfback Jeff Nicklin had elected to enlist in the Royal Winnipeg Rifles of the Canadian Army in the summer of 1940 and served abroad until his death in 1945. The Winnipeg Football club would establish a city league that had three teams, one with civilian Bomber players on it. The 1942 Grey Cup would be played with a team called the Winnipeg RCAF Bombers that was composed of all-stars from each of the teams.

== Exhibition games ==
Date	Opponent	Score	Result	Record
Sat, May 24	vs. University of North Dakota Sioux	25–5	Loss	0–1
Tues, Aug 26	vs. Columbus Bullies	19–12	Win	1–1
Mon, Sept 1	vs. Columbus Bullies	6–0	Loss	1–2
Wed, Sept 10	vs. Columbus Bullies	31–1	Loss	1–3
Sat, Oct 4	vs. Kenosha Cardinals	18–16	Loss	1–4
Sun, Nov 2	at. Kenosha Cardinals	35–6	Loss	1–5

== Regular season ==
=== Standings ===
Western Interprovincial Football Union
Team	GP	W	L	T	PF	PA	Pts
Winnipeg Blue Bombers	8	6	2	0	92	19	14
Regina Roughriders	8	5	3	0	64	43	8
Vancouver Grizzlies	8	1	7	0	15	109	2

=== Schedule ===
Week	Date	Opponent	Score	Result	Record
1	Sat, Sept 6	vs. Regina Roughriders	11–0	Win	1–0
2	Bye				
3	Mon, Sept 22	vs. Vancouver Grizzlies	18–0	Win	2–0
4	Thurs, Sept 25	vs. Vancouver Grizzlies	12–5	Win	3–0
	League Bye				
5	Sat, Oct 11	at Regina Roughriders	9–0	Loss	3–1
5	Mon, Oct 13	at Vancouver Grizzlies	17–0	Win	4–1
6	Wed, Oct 15	at Vancouver Grizzlies	12–0	Win	5–1
6	Sat, Oct 18	at Regina Roughriders	15–1	Win^{[A]}	5–2
7	Sat, Oct 25	vs. Regina Roughriders	7–4	Win	6–2

A. Winnipeg forfeited this game for using an ineligible player, Ken Preston.

== Playoffs ==
Game	Date	Opponent	Score	Result
WIFU Final #1	Nov 8	at Regina Roughriders	8–6	Loss
WIFU Final #2	Nov 11	vs. Regina Roughriders	18–12	Win
WIFU Final #3	Nov 15	vs. Regina Roughriders	8–2	Win
29th Grey Cup	Nov 29	Ottawa Rough Riders	18–16	Win

=== Grey Cup ===
Team	Q1	Q2	Q3	Q4	Total
Winnipeg Blue Bombers	3	6	9	0	18
Ottawa Rough Riders	6	3	6	1	16
