= 1953 Hamilton Tiger-Cats season =

Season of Canadian Football League team the Hamilton Tiger-Cats

- Head coach: Carl Voyles
- Home stadium: Civic Stadium

Results
- Record: 8–6
- Division place: 2nd, East
- Playoffs: Won Grey Cup

The 1953 Hamilton Tiger-Cats finished in second place in the East Division with an 8–6 record and won the Grey Cup over the Winnipeg Blue Bombers. This was their first Grey Cup as the Hamilton Tiger-Cats and the eighth won by teams based in Hamilton.

== Preseason ==
| Week | Date | Opponent | Result | Record | Attendance |
|---|---|---|---|---|---|
| A | Aug 14 | Calgary Stampeders | L 18–19 | 0–1 | 12,500 |
| A | Aug 17 | Saskatchewan Roughriders | W 21–12 | 1–1 | 10,000 |

== Regular season ==
=== Season standings ===
Interprovincial Rugby Football Union
| Team | GP | W | L | T | PF | PA | Pts |
|---|---|---|---|---|---|---|---|
| Montreal Alouettes | 14 | 8 | 6 | 0 | 292 | 229 | 16 |
| Hamilton Tiger-Cats | 14 | 8 | 6 | 0 | 229 | 243 | 16 |
| Ottawa Rough Riders | 14 | 7 | 7 | 0 | 266 | 238 | 14 |
| Toronto Argonauts | 14 | 5 | 9 | 0 | 172 | 249 | 10 |

=== Season schedule ===
| Week | Date | Opponent | Result | Record | Attendance |
|---|---|---|---|---|---|
| 1 | Aug 29 | vs. Ottawa Rough Riders | W 14–10 | 1–0 | 12,000 |
| 2 | Sept 7 | vs. Toronto Argonauts | W 14–12 | 2–0 | 17,000 |
| 3 | Sept 11 | at Montreal Alouettes | L 0–17 | 2–1 | 13,215 |
| 4 | Sept 16 | vs. Toronto Argonauts | L 20–21 | 2–2 | |
| 4 | Sept 19 | at Toronto Argonauts | W 12–9 | 3–2 | 20,382 |
| 5 | Sept 26 | vs. Montreal Alouettes | W 20–15 | 4–2 | 16,000 |
| 6 | Oct 3 | at Ottawa Rough Riders | L 6–31 | 4–3 | 15,500 |
| 7 | Oct 10 | at Toronto Argonauts | W 26–0 | 5–3 | |
| 8 | Oct 12 | Toronto Argonauts | L 12–30 | 5–4 | 19,069 |
| 9 | Oct 17 | at Ottawa Rough Riders | W 33–24 | 6–4 | 13,500 |
| 10 | Oct 24 | at Toronto Argonauts | L 5–17 | 6–5 | 19,437 |
| 11 | Oct 31 | vs. Montreal Alouettes | W 31–18 | 7–5 | 17,000 |
| 12 | Nov 8 | at Montreal Alouettes | L 18–31 | 7–6 | 12,085 |
| 13 | Nov 14 | vs. Ottawa Rough Riders | W 18–8 | 8–6 | 18,000 |

== Playoffs ==
=== Schedule ===
| Week | Date | Opponent | Result | Attendance |
|---|---|---|---|---|
| IRFU Final #1 | Nov 18 | vs. Montreal Alouettes | W 37–12 | 16,000 |
| IRFU Final #2 | Nov 22 | at Montreal Alouettes | W 22–11 | 18,070 |
| Grey Cup | Nov 28 | vs. Winnipeg Blue Bombers | W 12–6 | 27,313 |

==== Grey Cup ====
| Teams | Q1 | Q2 | Q3 | Q4 | Final |
|---|---|---|---|---|---|
| Winnipeg Blue Bombers | 0 | 0 | 6 | 0 | 6 |
| Hamilton Tiger-Cats | 6 | 0 | 6 | 0 | 12 |
