= 1935 Winnipeg Winnipegs season =

Canadian football team season

- General manager: Joe Ryan
- President: Frank Hannibal
- Head coach: Bob Fritz
- Home stadium: Osborne Stadium

Results
- Record: 3–0
- Division place: 1st, MRFU
- Playoffs: Won Grey Cup

The 1935 Winnipeg Winnipegs finished in first place in the Manitoba Rugby Football Union with a 3–0 division record. The Winnipegs became the first Western Canada team to win the Grey Cup, with a victory over the Hamilton Tigers.

== Exhibition games ==
Date	Opponent	Score	Result	Record
Sept 14	at Concordia Cobbers	26–0	Win	1–0
Sept 21	vs. Sarnia Imperials	3–1	Win	2–0
Sept 28	at Minnesota All-Stars	21–13	Win	3–0
Oct 24	vs. University of North Dakota Sioux	23-7	Win	4-0
Dec 2	at Assumption College	17-0	Win	5–0

== Regular season ==
=== Standings ===
Manitoba Rugby Football Union
Team	GP	W	L	T	PF	PA	Pts
Winnipegs	3	3	0	0	97	4	6
Victorias	3	0	3	0	4	97	0

=== Schedule ===
Date	Opponent	Score	Result	Record
Oct 5	Victoria Bisons	29–3	Win	1–0
Oct 12	Victoria Bisons	29–0	Win	2–0
Oct 19	Victoria Bisons	39–1	Win	3–0

== Playoffs ==
Round	Date	Opponent	Result	Record
Western Semi-Final	Nov 2	vs. Regina Roughriders	W 13–6	1–0
Western Title Game	Nov 9	vs. Calgary Bronks	W 7–0	2–0
Grey Cup	Dec 7	Hamilton Tigers	W 18–12	3–0

=== Grey Cup ===
Team	Q1	Q2	Q3	Q4	Total
Winnipegs	5	7	6	0	18
Hamilton Tigers	3	1	6	2	12
