= Lionel Conacher Award =

Annual award to a Canadian male athlete

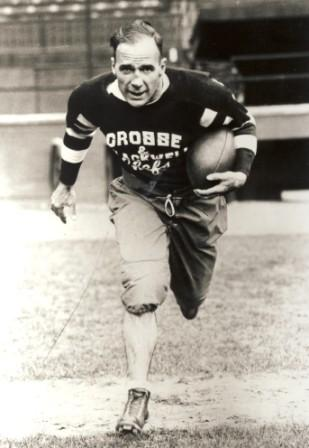
Named Canada's male athlete of the half-century in 1950, Lionel Conacher won both the Grey Cup and Stanley Cup during his career as well as championships in baseball, lacrosse and boxing.

The Lionel Conacher Award is an annual award given to Canada's male athlete of the year. The sports writers of the Canadian Press (CP) first conducted a poll to determine the nation's top athlete, of either gender, in 1932. Separate polls for the best male and female athletes were conducted beginning the following year. The CP formalized the poll into an award in 1978, presenting their winner a plaque. It was named after Lionel Conacher, a multi-sport champion whom the news organization had named its top athlete of the half-century in 1950. The award is separate from the Northern Star Award, in which a select panel of sports writers vote for their top overall athlete.

The poll was suspended for four years during the Second World War after the CP decided it could not name a sporting "hero" at a time when Canadian soldiers were fighting in Europe. Football player Joe Krol became the first repeat winner following the war, earning top spot in both 1946 and 1947. Hockey star Maurice Richard was the first three-time winner in 1958, and baseball pitcher Ferguson Jenkins the first four-time winner in 1974. Hockey Hall of Famer Wayne Gretzky has won the most Lionel Conacher Awards, finishing top of the poll six times in the 1980s, and in 1999 was named the Canadian Press Athlete of the Century.

The most recent winner is basketball player Shai Gilgeous-Alexander.

== Voting ==
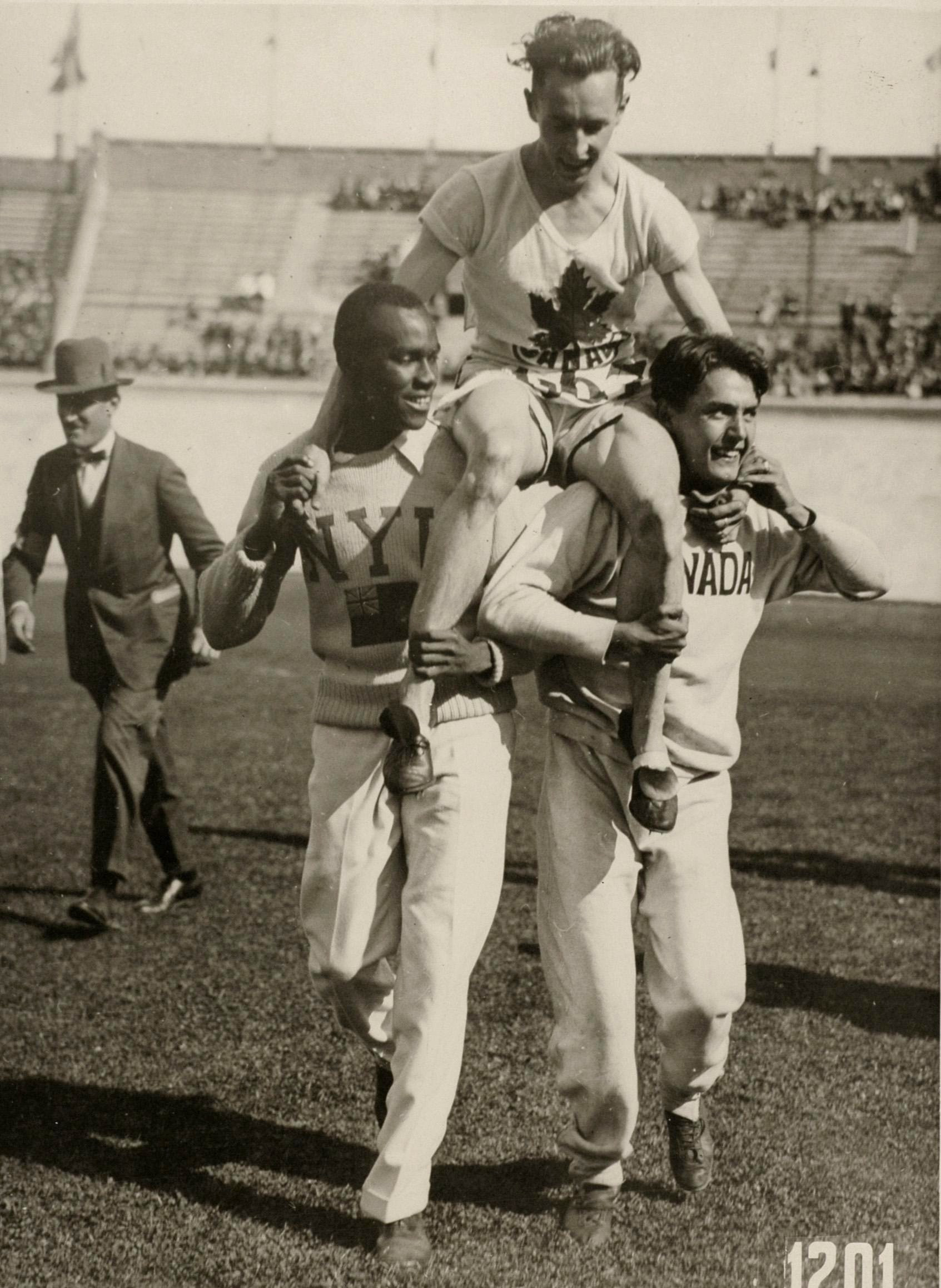
Phil Edwards (left) won in 1936.

The winner was originally selected following a straight vote of each writer's top choice. Golfer Ross Somerville won the inaugural poll after becoming the first Canadian to win the United States Amateur Championship. By 1936, the poll was conducted via a points system where each writer ranked their top three choices. Their first choice received three points, second choice two, and third choice one point. This points system has remained since. In 2001 golfer Mike Weir defeated hockey player Joe Sakic by two points in one of the closest votes in the award's history. He did so despite earning 13 fewer first place votes than Sakic.

Historically, the poll has not been limited to Canadians. Foreign-born athletes who were outstanding performers in Canadian sport have also gained consideration. Football player Fritz Hanson, a native of Minnesota, was named top athlete in 1939, while American Don Jones finished fourth in voting in 1971 on the strength of his performances with the Winnipeg Blue Bombers of the Canadian Football League. The poll became increasingly dominated by professional athletes since the 1960s – only three amateurs won the award between 1965 and 1984.

Winners have represented a broad spectrum of sports. Individual sport winners include weightlifter Doug Hepburn in 1953, figure skater Kurt Browning in 1990 and 1991, and most recently, gymnast Kyle Shewfelt in 2004. Participants in one of North America's "major league" team sports won each year between 2005 and 2010. National Hockey League player Sidney Crosby and National Basketball Association player Steve Nash have each won three times overall and Major League Baseball player Justin Morneau won in 2008. Overall, hockey players have finished at the top of the annual polls the most times at 26. Track and field is second with 13 winners and football third with 10.

== List of winners ==
Year	Winner	Sport	Win #	Achievement
1932	Ross Somerville	Golf	1	First Canadian winner of the United States Amateur Championship
1933	Dave Komonen	Track and field	1	Canadian and American champion, second place in the Boston Marathon
1934	Harold Webster	Track and field	1	Winner of the marathon at the 1934 British Empire Games
1935	Scotty Rankine	Track and field	1	Winner of marathon in Berwick, Pennsylvania despite suffering from hernia
1936	Phil Edwards^{[a]}	Track and field	1	Bronze medal winner in 800 metre race at the 1936 Summer Olympics
1937	Syl Apps	Hockey	1	National Hockey League rookie of the year
1938	Bummer Stirling	Football	1	Top-scorer in Eastern Canada
1939	Fritz Hanson	Football	1	Led the Winnipeg Blue Bombers to championship in the 27th Grey Cup
1940	Gérard Côté^{[a]}	Track and field	1	Winner of the Boston Marathon and United States Amateur Athletic Union title
1941	Tony Golab	Football	1	Led Ottawa Rough Riders to appearance in the 29th Grey Cup game
1942	No award (Second World War)^{[b]}			
1943	No award (Second World War)^{[b]}			
1944	No award (Second World War)^{[b]}			
1945	No award (Second World War)^{[b]}			
1946	Joe Krol^{[a]}	Football	1	Led Toronto Argonauts to championship in the 34th Grey Cup
1947	Joe Krol	Football	2	Led Toronto Argonauts to third consecutive Grey Cup championship
1948	Buddy O'Connor	Hockey	1	First player to be named both most valuable and most sportsmanlike player in National Hockey League history
1949	Frank Filchock	Football	1	Led Montreal Alouettes to championship in the 37th Grey Cup
1950	Lionel Conacher; Athlete of the half-century^{[c]}	Multiple	—	Also football player of half-century; Member of Grey Cup, Stanley Cup, and Little World Series championship teams, Canadian light-heavyweight boxing champion
1951	No award			
1952	Maurice Richard	Hockey	1	Broke Nels Stewart's National Hockey League record of 344 goals
1953	Doug Hepburn^{[a]}	Weightlifting	1	Canadian, British Empire and World champion at 90+ kg
1954	Rich Ferguson	Track and field	1	Bronze medal winner and Canadian record breaker in the "Miracle Mile" race at the 1954 British Empire and Commonwealth Games
1955	Normie Kwong	Football	1	Broke four Western Interprovincial Football Union records during season
1956	Jean Béliveau	Hockey	1	Led Montreal Canadiens to Stanley Cup championship
1957	Maurice Richard^{[a]}	Hockey	2	Scored 500th career National Hockey League goal
1958	Maurice Richard	Hockey	3	Returned from severe Achilles injury to lead Montreal Canadiens to Stanley Cup championship
1959	Russ Jackson	Football	1	Starting quarterback for the Ottawa Rough Riders
1960	Ron Stewart	Football	1	Set Canadian football record with 287 rushing yards in one game
1961	Bruce Kidd^{[a]}	Track and field	1	Broke numerous Canadian and American track records
1962	Bruce Kidd	Track and field	2	Won gold and bronze medals at the 1962 British Empire and Commonwealth Games
1963	Gordie Howe	Hockey	1	Broke Maurice Richard's National Hockey League record of 544 career goals
1964	Bill Crothers	Track and field	1	Silver medalist in 800 metre race at 1964 Summer Olympics
1965	Bobby Hull	Hockey	1	Voted most valuable and most gentlemanly player in the National Hockey League
1966	Bobby Hull	Hockey	2	Set National Hockey League records with 54 goals and 97 points in one season
1967	Ferguson Jenkins	Baseball	1	First Canadian pitcher to win 20 Major League Baseball games in 50 years
1968	Ferguson Jenkins	Baseball	2	Second consecutive 20-win season
1969	Russ Jackson^{[a]}	Football	2	Canadian Football League's most outstanding player and Canadian, led the Ottawa Rough Riders to championship in the 57th Grey Cup
1970	Bobby Orr^{[a]}	Hockey	1	National Hockey League's most valuable player in both the regular season and playoffs, top defenceman and scoring leader
1971	Ferguson Jenkins	Baseball	3	First Canadian winner of Major League Baseball's Cy Young Award
1972	Phil Esposito^{[a]}	Hockey	1	National Hockey League scoring champion and led Team Canada to victory over the Soviet Union in the Summit Series
1973	Phil Esposito	Hockey	2	Noted leader and goal scorer in the National Hockey League
1974	Ferguson Jenkins^{[a]}	Baseball	4	Seventh 20-win season in eight years, also named comeback player of the year
1975	Bobby Clarke^{[a]}	Hockey	1	National Hockey League's most valuable player and led Philadelphia Flyers to Stanley Cup championship
1976	Greg Joy	Track and field	1	Silver medalist in the high-jump at the 1976 Summer Olympics
1977	Guy Lafleur^{[a]}	Hockey	1	National Hockey League scoring leader and led Montreal Canadiens to Stanley Cup championship
1978	Graham Smith^{[a]}	Swimming	1	Won six gold medals at 1978 Commonwealth Games and won gold medal with world record performance at the world championship
1979	Gilles Villeneuve	Auto racing	1	Won three Formula One races and finished second in driver's championship
1980	Wayne Gretzky	Hockey	1	Named most valuable and most gentlemanly player in the National Hockey League
1981	Wayne Gretzky	Hockey	2	Set National Hockey League scoring records of 109 assists and 164 points in one season
1982	Wayne Gretzky^{[a]}	Hockey	3	Set National Hockey League scoring records of 92 goals, 120 assists, 212 points and fastest to 50 goals in league history
1983	Wayne Gretzky^{[a]}	Hockey	4	National Hockey League scoring leader
1984	Alex Baumann	Swimming	1	Double gold medalist and set two world records at the 1984 Summer Olympics
1985	Wayne Gretzky^{[a]}	Hockey	5	Led Edmonton Oilers to Stanley Cup championship
1986	Ben Johnson^{[a]}	Track and field	1	Double gold medalist at the 1986 Commonwealth Games and named "fastest man in the world"
1987	Ben Johnson^{[a]}	Track and field	2	Set world record in the 100 metre race at 1987 IAAF World Championships
1988	Mario Lemieux	Hockey	1	National Hockey League most valuable player and scoring leader
1989	Wayne Gretzky^{[a]}	Hockey	6	Broke Gordie Howe's National Hockey League record of 1850 career points
1990	Kurt Browning^{[a]}	Figure skating	1	Canadian and world champion
1991	Kurt Browning	Figure skating	2	Canadian and world champion
1992	Mark Tewksbury^{[a]}	Swimming	1	Gold and bronze medalist at the 1992 Summer Olympics
1993	Mario Lemieux^{[a]}	Hockey	2	Overcame Hodgkin's lymphoma to win National Hockey League scoring title
1994	Elvis Stojko	Figure skating	1	World Champion and silver medalist at the 1994 Winter Olympics
1995	Jacques Villeneuve^{[a]}	Auto racing	1	First Canadian to win the Indianapolis 500
1996	Donovan Bailey^{[a]}	Track and field	1	Double gold medalist and set 100 metre world record at 1996 Summer Olympics
1997	Jacques Villeneuve^{[a]}	Auto racing	2	Formula One World Champion
1998	Larry Walker^{[a]}	Baseball	1	National League batting champion
1999	Wayne Gretzky; Athlete of the Century^{[c]}	Hockey	—	National Hockey League's all-time leader in goals, assists and points, four time Stanley Cup champion, named most valuable player nine times, league scoring leader ten times
2000	Mike Weir	Golf	1	Winner of a World Golf Championships event
2001	Mike Weir	Golf	2	Winner of the PGA Tour Championship
2002	Steve Nash	Basketball	1	National Basketball Association All-Star and named to All-NBA Team
2003	Mike Weir^{[a]}	Golf	3	Winner of the Masters Tournament
2004	Kyle Shewfelt	Gymnastics	1	Gold medal winner at the 2004 Summer Olympics
2005	Steve Nash^{[a]}	Basketball	2	First Canadian to be named the National Basketball Association's most valuable player
2006	Steve Nash	Basketball	3	Second consecutive National Basketball Association Most Valuable Player Award
2007	Sidney Crosby^{[a]}	Hockey	1	National Hockey League's most valuable player
2008	Justin Morneau	Baseball	1	Second place in voting for American League Most Valuable Player Award
2009	Sidney Crosby^{[a]}	Hockey	2	Led the Pittsburgh Penguins to Stanley Cup championship
2010	Sidney Crosby	Hockey	3	Scored gold medal-winning goal at the 2010 Winter Olympics
2011	Patrick Chan^{[a]}	Figure skating	1	Finished 2011 undefeated in competition. He was the 2011 World Champion (setting three scoring records), Canadian Champion and he won an additional three ISU Grand Prix events.
2012	Ryder Hesjedal	Cycling	1	Became the first Canadian to win a Grand Tour when he won the Giro d'Italia
2013	Milos Raonic	Tennis	1	Became the first Canadian to reach the ATP's Top 10, help Canada Davis Cup team to reach first semifinal after 100 years, won two events and made the final of the Rogers Cup in Montreal.
2014	Milos Raonic	Tennis	2	At Wimbledon 2014 he made it to the final four; first Canadian to reach a Grand Slam semifinal.
2015	Carey Price^{[a]}	Hockey	1	Multiple NHL awards.
2016	Andre De Grasse	Track and field	1	Won three medals at the 2016 Summer Olympics.
2017	Denis Shapovalov	Tennis	1	Reached the semifinals at the Rogers Cup, Montreal's Masters 1000 event, and got to the fourth round of the US open.
2018	Mikael Kingsbury^{[a]}	Freestyle skiing	1	Gold medal in 2018 Winter Olympics, Men's Mogul.
2019	Mikael Kingsbury	Freestyle skiing	2	Dominating much of the 2019 World Cup circuit in moguls, including the world championship in both single and dual moguls
2020	Alphonso Davies^{[a]}	Soccer	1	Fullback for Bayern Munich. Won the 2019–20 Champions League, 2019–20 Bundesliga, Bundesliga Rookie of the Year Award and became the first North American player named to the FIFPRO World XI team
2021	Damian Warner^{[a]}	Track and Field	1	2020 Olympic decathlon champion, fourth decathlete in history to record a score above 9000 points, set a world decathlon best in the long jump.
2022	Félix Auger-Aliassime	Tennis	1	Won four ATP-tour titles plus the Davis Cup.
2023	Shai Gilgeous-Alexander^{[a]}	Basketball	1	Led Canada to its first-ever medal at the FIBA World Cup, and qualifying for the Summer Olympics for the first time in 24 years. Named to both the World Cup All-Tournament Team and the 2023 All-NBA Team.
2024	Ethan Katzberg	Track and Field	1	Became the first Canadian to win the Olympic gold medal in men's hammer throw at the 2024 Summer Olympics.
2025	Shai Gilgeous-Alexander^{[a]}	Basketball	2	Led the Oklahoma City Thunder to the NBA title, whilst being the top scorer in the regular season and winning both the NBA Most Valuable Player and NBA Finals Most Valuable Player awards.

== See also ==
- Bobbie Rosenfeld Award
- Canadian Press Team of the Year Award
- Velma Springstead Trophy

== Notes ==
^{a} Denotes athlete also won the Northern Star Award as Canadian athlete of the year.

^{b} According to the Canadian Press, the award was discontinued between 1942 and 1945 because "sports writers decided athletes cannot rate as heroes while young Canadian pilots, paratroopers and corvette gunners fought for freedom in the shadow of death".

^{c} No winner was announced for the years 1950 or 1999 as the Canadian Press instead voted for athlete of the half-century and century, respectively.
