= 1938 Calgary Bronks season =

- Head coach: Carl Cronin
- Home stadium: Mewata Stadium

Results
- Record: 6–2
- Division place: 1st, W.I.F.U.
- Playoffs: Lost W.I.F.U. Finals

The 1938 Calgary Bronks season was the fourth season in franchise history where the team finished in first place in the Western Interprovincial Football Union with a 6–2 record. The Bronks played in the WIFU Finals, but lost to the Winnipeg Blue Bombers in a two-game series by a total points score of 25–9.

== Regular season ==
=== Standings ===
Western Interprovincial Football Union
| Team | GP | W | L | T | PF | PA | Pts |
|---|---|---|---|---|---|---|---|
| Calgary Bronks | 8 | 6 | 2 | 0 | 50 | 27 | 12 |
| Winnipeg Blue Bombers | 8 | 6 | 2 | 0 | 114 | 63 | 12 |
| Regina Roughriders | 8 | 4 | 4 | 0 | 69 | 55 | 8 |
| Edmonton Eskimos | 8 | 0 | 8 | 0 | 29 | 117 | 0 |

=== Schedule ===
| Game | Date | Opponent | Results | | Venue | Attendance |
| Game | Date | Opponent | Score | Record | Venue | Attendance |
|---|---|---|---|---|---|---|
| 1 | Sept 3 | Winnipeg Blue Bombers | L 0–6 | 0–2 | | |
| 2 | Sept 5 | Regina Roughriders | L 0–9 | 0–2 | | |
Bye
| 3 | Sept 17 | Edmonton Eskimos | W 16–3 | 1–2 | | |
| 4 | Sept 24 | Edmonton Eskimos | W 5–3 | 2–2 | | |
Bye
| 5 | Oct 8 | Winnipeg Blue Bombers | W 14–0 | 3–2 | | |
| 6 | Oct 10 | Regina Roughriders | W 5–3 | 4–2 | | |
| 7 | Oct 15 | Edmonton Eskimos | W 6–3 | 5–2 | | |
| 8 | Oct 22 | Edmonton Eskimos | W 4–0 | 6–2 | | |

== Playoffs ==
| Round | Date | Opponent | Results | | Venue | Attendance |
| Round | Date | Opponent | Score | Record | Venue | Attendance |
|---|---|---|---|---|---|---|
| WIFU Finals | Nov 5 | Winnipeg Blue Bombers | L 7–12 | 0–1 | | |
| WIFU Finals | Nov 12 | Winnipeg Blue Bombers | L 2–13 | 0–2 | | |

- Winnipeg won the total-point series by 25–9. Winnipeg advances to the Grey Cup game.
