= 1940 Calgary Bronks season =

- Head coach: Larry Haynes
- Home stadium: Mewata Stadium

Results
- Record: 4–4
- Division place: 2nd, W.I.F.U.
- Playoffs: Lost W.I.F.U. Finals

The 1940 Calgary Bronks season was the sixth season in franchise history where the team finished in second place in the Western Interprovincial Football Union with a 4–4 record. The Bronks played in the WIFU Finals for the fifth consecutive year, but once again lost to the Winnipeg Blue Bombers in a two-game series by a total points score of 30–2.

== Regular season ==
=== Standings ===
Western Interprovincial Football Union
Team	GP	W	L	T	PF	PA	Pts
Winnipeg Blue Bombers	8	6	2	0	108	58	12
Calgary Bronks	8	4	4	0	79	76	8
Regina Roughriders	8	2	6	0	39	92	4

=== Schedule ===
Game	Date	Opponent	Results		Venue	Attendance
Game	Date	Opponent	Score	Record	Venue	Attendance
1	August 30	Winnipeg Blue Bombers	W 12–1	1–0		
Bye
2	September 14	Regina Roughriders	W 12–3	2–0		
3	September 16	Winnipeg Blue Bombers	L 3–22	2–1		
4	September 21	Regina Roughriders	W 17–3	3–1		
Bye
5	October 5	Winnipeg Blue Bombers	L 1–3	3–2		
6	October 12	Winnipeg Blue Bombers	L 19–26	3–3		
7	October 14	Regina Roughriders	L 0–17	3–4		
8	October 19	Regina Roughriders	W 7–1	4–4		
Bye

== Playoffs ==
Round	Date	Opponent	Results		Venue	Attendance
Round	Date	Opponent	Score	Record	Venue	Attendance
WIFU Finals Game 1	November 2	Winnipeg Blue Bombers	L 0–7	0–1		
WIFU Finals Game 2	November 9	Winnipeg Blue Bombers	L 2–23	0–2		

- Winnipeg won the total-point series by 30–2.
