= Bill Ceretti =

Canadian football player

Profile
- Positions: Guard, Defensive tackle

Personal information
- Born: March 10, 1912; Winnipeg, Manitoba, Canada
- Died: May 5, 1974 (aged 62); Winnipeg, Manitoba, Canada

Career history
- 1931–41, 46–48: Winnipeg Blue Bombers

Awards and highlights
- 3× Grey Cup champion (1935, 1939, 1941); 3× CFL All-Star (1938, 40, 46); Winnipeg Football Club Hall of Fame (1985); Manitoba Sports Hall of Fame (2001)

Bill Ceretti (March 10, 1912 – May 5, 1974), was an offensive and defensive lineman who played thirteen seasons for the Winnipeg Blue Bombers franchise. He was a three-time Grey Cup champion, having won in 1935, 1939, and 1941. In 1975, sportswriter Vince Leah called Ceretti "one of the finest Canadian-born linemen in the history of the game." In 2001, he was inducted into the Manitoba Sports Hall of Fame and Museum.
