= 1939 Winnipeg Blue Bombers season =

Canadian football team season

- General manager: Joe Ryan
- President: Wally Brown
- Head coach: Reg Threlfall
- Home stadium: Osborne Stadium

Results
- Record: 10–2
- Division place: 1st, WIFU
- Playoffs: Won Grey Cup

The 1939 Winnipeg Blue Bombers finished in first place in the WIFU with a 10–2 record. The Blue Bombers won their second Grey Cup championship by defeating the Ottawa Rough Riders 8–7.

== Regular season ==
=== Standings ===
Western Interprovincial Football Union
Team	GP	W	L	T	PF	PA	Pts
Winnipeg Blue Bombers	12	10	2	0	201	103	20
Regina Roughriders	12	6	6	0	84	136	12
Calgary Bronks	11	4	7	0	144	123	8
Edmonton Eskimos	11	3	8	0	80	147	6

=== Schedule ===
Week	Game	Date	Opponent	Result	Record
1	1	Fri, Aug 25	at Calgary Bronks	W 12–1	1–0
2	2	Fri, Sept 1	vs. Regina Roughriders	W 20–6	2–0
2	3	Mon, Sept 4	at Regina Roughriders	W 17–1	3–0
3	Bye				
4	4	Fri, Sept 15	vs. Calgary Bronks	W 19–18	4–0
4	5	Mon, Sept 18	vs. Edmonton Eskimos	W 14–7	5–0
5	6	Fri, Sept 22	at Edmonton Eskimos	W 18–0	6–0
6	7	Sat, Sept 30	vs. Calgary Bronks	W 25–6	7–0
7	8	Fri, Oct 6	at Calgary Bronks	W 19–17	8–0
7	9	Mon, Oct 9	at Edmonton Eskimos	L 11–30	8–1
8	10	Sat, Oct 14	vs. Edmonton Eskimos	W 18–1	9–1
9	11	Sat, Oct 21	at Regina Roughriders	L 12–16	9–2
10	12	Sat, Oct 28	vs. Regina Roughriders	W 16–0	10–2

== Playoffs ==
Round	Date	Opponent	Result	Record
WIFU Final #1	Nov 11	vs. Calgary Bronks	L 7–13	0–1
WIFU Final #2	Nov 18	at Calgary Bronks	W 28–7	1–1
Grey Cup	Dec 9	Ottawa Rough Riders	W 8–7	2–1

=== Grey Cup ===
Team	Q1	Q2	Q3	Q4	Total
Winnipeg Blue Bombers	5	1	0	2	8
Ottawa Rough Riders	6	0	0	1	7
