= 1971 Calgary Stampeders season =

Canadian football team season

- General manager: Rogers Lehew
- Head coach: Jim Duncan
- Home stadium: McMahon Stadium

Results
- Record: 9–6–1
- Division place: 1st, West
- Playoffs: Won Grey Cup

The 1971 Calgary Stampeders season was the 14th season for the team in the Canadian Football League (CFL) and their 27th overall. The team finished in first place in the Western Conference with a 9–6–1 record and won the franchise's second Grey Cup title with a 14–11 victory over the Toronto Argonauts in the 59th Grey Cup game.

== Preseason ==
| Game | Date | Opponent | Results | | Venue | Attendance |
| Game | Date | Opponent | Score | Record | Venue | Attendance |
|---|---|---|---|---|---|---|
| A | Bye | | | | | |
| B | Wed, July 7 | vs. Saskatchewan Roughriders | W 27–0 | 1–0 | McMahon Stadium | 18,910 |
| B | Mon, July 12 | at Montreal Alouettes | W 25–14 | 2–0 | Autostade | 12,529 |
| C | Fri, July 16 | at Edmonton Eskimos | L 21–24 | 2–1 | Clarke Stadium | 16,000 |
| D | Thu, July 22 | vs. Montreal Alouettes | W 41–8 | 3–1 | McMahon Stadium | 18,046 |

== Regular season ==
=== Season standings ===
Western Football Conference
| Team | GP | W | L | T | PF | PA | Pts |
|---|---|---|---|---|---|---|---|
| Calgary Stampeders | 16 | 9 | 6 | 1 | 290 | 218 | 19 |
| Saskatchewan Roughriders | 16 | 9 | 6 | 1 | 347 | 316 | 19 |
| Winnipeg Blue Bombers | 16 | 7 | 8 | 1 | 366 | 349 | 15 |
| BC Lions | 16 | 6 | 9 | 1 | 282 | 363 | 13 |
| Edmonton Eskimos | 16 | 6 | 10 | 0 | 237 | 305 | 12 |

=== Season schedule ===
| Week | Game | Date | Opponent | Results | | Venue | Attendance |
| Week | Game | Date | Opponent | Score | Record | Venue | Attendance |
|---|---|---|---|---|---|---|---|
| 1 | 1 | Fri, July 30 | at Saskatchewan Roughriders | W 21–0 | 1–0 | Taylor Field | 16,000 |
| 2 | 2 | Wed, Aug 4 | vs. Ottawa Rough Riders | W 9–8 | 2–0 | McMahon Stadium | 22,251 |
| 3 | 3 | Wed, Aug 11 | at Edmonton Eskimos | W 31–1 | 3–0 | Clarke Stadium | 23,049 |
| 3 | 4 | Mon, Aug 16 | vs. Winnipeg Blue Bombers | W 36–12 | 4–0 | McMahon Stadium | 23,425 |
| 4 | Bye | | | | | | |
| 5 | 5 | Tues, Aug 24 | vs. BC Lions | W 32–1 | 5–0 | McMahon Stadium | 23,616 |
| 6 | 6 | Wed, Sept 1 | at Winnipeg Blue Bombers | L 15–31 | 5–1 | Winnipeg Stadium | 22,553 |
| 6 | 7 | Mon, Sept 6 | vs. Edmonton Eskimos | W 23–7 | 6–1 | McMahon Stadium | 23,616 |
| 7 | 8 | Sun, Sept 12 | at BC Lions | W 25–10 | 7–1 | Empire Stadium | 30,660 |
| 8 | 9 | Wed, Sept 15 | vs. Winnipeg Blue Bombers | W 20–7 | 8–1 | McMahon Stadium | 23,616 |
| 9 | 10 | Wed, Sept 22 | at Montreal Alouettes | L 11–26 | 8–2 | Autostade | 30,821 |
| 9 | 11 | Sat, Sept 25 | at Toronto Argonauts | L 7–18 | 8–3 | Exhibition Stadium | 33,135 |
| 10 | 12 | Sun, Oct 3 | vs. Hamilton Tiger-Cats | W 17–1 | 9–3 | McMahon Stadium | 23,616 |
| 11 | 13 | Mon, Oct 11 | vs. Saskatchewan Roughriders | L 17–24 | 9–4 | McMahon Stadium | 23,616 |
| 12 | 14 | Sun, Oct 17 | at Saskatchewan Roughriders | T 7–7 | 9–4–1 | Taylor Field | 21,706 |
| 13 | 15 | Sat, Oct 23 | vs. Edmonton Eskimos | L 12–34 | 9–5–1 | McMahon Stadium | 19,549 |
| 14 | 16 | Sat, Oct 30 | at BC Lions | L 7–31 | 9–6–1 | Empire Stadium | 21,489 |

== Playoffs ==
=== West Final ===
Western Finals – Game 1
Saskatchewan Roughriders @ Calgary Stampeders
| Date | Away | Home |
|---|---|---|
| November 13 | Saskatchewan Roughriders 21 | Calgary Stampeders 30 |

Western Finals – Game 2
Calgary Stampeders @ Saskatchewan Roughriders
| Date | Away | Home |
|---|---|---|
| November 17 | Calgary Stampeders 23 | Saskatchewan Roughriders 21 |

- Calgary won best-of-three series 2–0, advancing to the Grey Cup Championship game.

=== Grey Cup ===
November 28 59th Annual Grey Cup Game: Empire Stadium – Vancouver, British Columbia
| Western Champion | Eastern Champion |
|---|---|
| Calgary Stampeders 14 | Toronto Argonauts 11 |
The Calgary Stampeders were 1971 Grey Cup Champions
Wayne Harris (LB), Calgary Stampeders – Grey Cup Most Valuable Player; Dick Suderman (DE), Calgary Stampeders – Grey Cup Most Valuable Canadian

== Awards and records ==
- CFL's Most Outstanding Lineman Award – Wayne Harris (LB)

=== 1971 CFL All-Stars ===
- OG – Granville Liggins, CFL All-Star
- DT – John Helton, CFL All-Star
- DE – Craig Koinzan, CFL All-Star
- LB – Wayne Harris, CFL All-Star
- DB – Frank Andruski, CFL All-Star
