= 1939 Ottawa Rough Riders season =

Canadian football team season

- Head coach: Ross Trimble
- Home stadium: Lansdowne Park

Results
- Record: 5–1
- Division place: 1st, IRFU
- Playoffs: Lost Grey Cup

The 1939 Ottawa Rough Riders finished in first place in the Interprovincial Rugby Football Union with a 5–1 record, but lost the 27th Grey Cup to the Winnipeg Blue Bombers.

== Regular season ==
=== Standings ===
Interprovincial Rugby Football Union
Team	GP	W	L	T	PF	PA	Pts
Ottawa Rough Riders	6	5	1	0	145	44	10
Toronto Argonauts	6	4	1	1	58	43	9
Hamilton Tigers	6	2	4	0	29	84	4
Montreal Royals	6	0	5	1	23	84	1

=== Schedule ===
Week	Date	Opponent	Results	
Week	Date	Opponent	Score	Record
1	Oct 7	vs. Hamilton Tigers	W 32–4	1–0
2	Oct 14	at Montreal Royals	W 35–13	2–0
3	Oct 21	at Toronto Argonauts	W 18–7	3–0
4	Oct 28	vs. Toronto Argonauts	L 8–13	3–1
5	Nov 4	vs. Montreal Royals	W 27–0	4–1
6	Nov 11	at Hamilton Tigers	W 25–7	5–1

== Postseason ==
Round	Date	Opponent	Results	
Round	Date	Opponent	Score	Record
IRFU Final #1	Nov 18	vs. Toronto Argonauts	W 11–0	1–0
IRFU Final #2	Nov 25	at Toronto Argonauts	W 28–6	2–0
Eastern Final	Dec 2	vs. Sarnia Imperials	W 23–1	3–0
Grey Cup	Dec 9	Winnipeg Blue Bombers	L 7–8	3–1
