= Paul Brothers (Canadian football) =

American gridiron football player (born 1945)

No. 15, 10
- Position: Quarterback

Personal information
- Born: April 18, 1945 (age 81); Rock Springs, Wyoming, U.S.
- Listed height: 6 ft 1 in (1.85 m)
- Listed weight: 190 lb (86 kg)

Career information
- High school: Roseburg (OR)
- College: Oregon State
- NFL draft: 1967: 16th round, 416th overall pick

Career history
- 1967: Eugene Bombers
- 1968–1971: BC Lions
- 1971–1972: Ottawa Rough Riders

Awards and highlights
- Second-team All-Pac-8 (1966)

Career CFL statistics
- Passing comp: 516
- Passing att: 1032
- Passing yards: 7332
- Passing TDs: 36

Paul Brothers (born April 18, 1945) is an American former football quarterback in the Canadian Football League (CFL) for the BC Lions and Ottawa Rough Riders. He was selected by the Dallas Cowboys in the sixteenth round of the 1967 NFL/AFL draft. He played college football at Oregon State University.

== Early life ==
Brothers was a two-time All-State quarterback at Roseburg High School, where he led the team to a football state championship in 1961. Following graduation in 1963, he stayed in state to play at Oregon State University in Corvallis.

== College career ==
Brothers accepted a football scholarship from Oregon State University to play under head coach Tommy Prothro. As a sophomore in 1964, he was named the starter at quarterback after a season-opening 3–7 loss at Northwestern. He led the Beavers to eight wins in the next nine games, the Pac-8 title, and the Rose Bowl, where they lost 7–34 to Michigan.

In his senior season in 1966, under second-year head coach Dee Andros, injuries forced Brothers to split time with sophomore Steve Preece. He finished his career as a three-year starter, recording 184 completions out of 404 attempts (45.5 avg.), 2,151 passing yards, 15 touchdowns, 17 interceptions, 376 carries for 1,090 yards (2.9-yard avg.) and 13 rushing touchdowns. At the time, Brothers ranked second in school history (behind Terry Baker) in total offense.

He was inducted into the OSU Athletics Hall of Fame in 1997 and the Oregon Sports Hall of Fame in 2010.

== Professional career ==
Brothers was selected by the Dallas Cowboys in the sixteenth round (416th overall) of the 1967 NFL/AFL draft, but opted not to sign with the team.

On March 14, 1967, he was signed by the BC Lions of the Canadian Football League, who already had veteran quarterback Joe Kapp, but did not know if he would re-sign. In July, Brothers was waived after the Lions had previously acquired Bernie Faloney to be their starting quarterback. On August 5, he was sent to the Eugene Bombers of the Continental Football League to gain more experience.

In 1968, Brothers was one of the three starters at quarterback that the Lions used during the season. Named the starter in 1969, he had 200 completions (tied for third in club history) out of 406 attempts, 2,671 passing yards, 14 touchdowns, and 33 interceptions. In 1970, Brothers posted 2,604 passing yards, 14 touchdowns, and 19 interceptions. On September 8, 1971, he was released after starting seven games with a 3–4 record; overall, he started 48 games for the Lions.

On September 14, 1971, Brothers began a five-game trial with the Ottawa Rough Riders, eventually earning a permanent role. On June 17, 1973, he announced his retirement to focus on his real estate business in Oregon.

== Coaching career ==
Back in Oregon, Brothers coached football and girls basketball at Marist High School in Eugene from 1975 to 1986 with a record of 196-139.

He joined the Willamette High School girls basketball program before the 1993-94 season, where he had a coaching record of 437-122, 17 consecutive postseason appearances, and won four Class 5A state championships (2007, 2009, 2013 and 2014). He retired in 2014.
