= Bud Marquardt =

American gridiron football player (1913–1989)

Profile
- Position: End

Personal information
- Born: December 15, 1913; Hettinger, North Dakota, U.S.
- Died: October 21, 1989 (aged 75); Winnipeg, Manitoba, Canada
- Listed height: 6 ft 5 in (1.96 m)
- Listed weight: 180 lb (82 kg)

Career information
- College: North Dakota State

Career history
- 1935–1941: Winnipeg Blue Bombers

Awards and highlights
- 3× Grey Cup champion (1935, 1939, 1941)

Wilbur Paul "Bud" Marquardt (December 15, 1913 – October 21, 1989) was a Canadian football player who played for the Winnipeg Blue Bombers. He won the Grey Cup with them in 1939 and 1941 and is a member of the Blue Bombers Hall of Fame. He attended North Dakota State University, where he is also a member of their hall of fame. In 2004, he was inducted into the Manitoba Sports Hall of Fame.
