= 1971 Hamilton Tiger-Cats season =

Season of Canadian Football League team the Hamilton Tiger-Cats

- Head coach: Al Dorow
- Home stadium: Ivor Wynne Stadium

Results
- Record: 7–7
- Division place: 2nd, East
- Playoffs: Lost Eastern Finals
- Team MOP: Garney Henley
- Team MOC: Bill Danychuk

The 1971 Hamilton Tiger-Cats season was the 14th season for the team in the Canadian Football League (CFL) and their 22nd overall. The Tiger-Cats finished in second place in the Eastern Conference with a 7–7 record, but lost the Eastern Finals to the Toronto Argonauts. On September 6, 1971, Joe Zuger and Dave Fleming set a franchise record with the longest single play passing yard, a 108-yard passing play against the Argonauts. Tony Gabriel's rookie season was with Hamilton in 1971, where he caught 20 passes for 285 yards.

== Roster ==
1971 Hamilton Tiger-Cats roster
Quarterbacks: Wally Gabler; John Manel; Running backs: Max Anderson; Dave Fleming; Receivers: Tommy Joe Coffey WR/K; Offensive linemen: Bill Danychuk G; Jon Hohman G	Defensive linemen Linebackers Defensive backs: Al Brenner; Jim Kates; Paul Johnson DB; Special teams: Joe Zuger P/QB	Injured List 6-Game Injured List	Practice Roster Suspended Active, Injured, Six-Game, Practice Roster, Suspended

== Regular season ==
=== Season standings ===
Eastern Football Conference
Team	GP	W	L	T	PF	PA	Pts
Toronto Argonauts	14	10	4	0	289	248	20
Hamilton Tiger-Cats	14	7	7	0	242	246	14
Ottawa Rough Riders	14	6	8	0	291	277	12
Montreal Alouettes	14	6	8	0	226	248	12

=== Season schedule ===
Week	Game	Date	Opponent	Results		Venue	Attendance
Week	Game	Date	Opponent	Score	Record	Venue	Attendance
1	1	July 29	vs. Edmonton Eskimos	W 17–15	1–0		
2	Bye						
3	2	Aug 11	at Ottawa Rough Riders	W 20–17	2–0		
4	Bye						
5	3	Aug 25	vs. Montreal Alouettes	L 8–12	2–1		
6	4	Aug 31	at Montreal Alouettes	L 24–25	2–2		
6	5	Sept 6	vs. Toronto Argonauts	W 30–17	3–2		
7	6	Sept 12	at Toronto Argonauts	L 14–23	3–3		
8	7	Sept 18	vs. Montreal Alouettes	W 10–9	4–3		
9	8	Sept 26	vs. Ottawa Rough Riders	W 19–7	5–3		
10	9	Oct 3	at Calgary Stampeders	L 1–17	5–4		
11	10	Oct 6	at Saskatchewan Roughriders	L 20–28	5–5		
11	11	Oct 11	vs. BC Lions	W 36–3	6–5		
12	12	Oct 17	at Winnipeg Blue Bombers	L 4–18	6–6		
13	13	Oct 23	vs. Ottawa Rough Riders	L 16–40	6–7		
14	14	Oct 31	at Toronto Argonauts	W 23–15	7–7		

== Post-season ==
Round	Date	Opponent	Results		Venue	Attendance
Round	Date	Opponent	Score	Record	Venue	Attendance
Eastern Semi-Final	Nov 7	vs. Ottawa Rough Riders	W 23–4	1–0		
Eastern Final #1	Nov 14	vs. Toronto Argonauts	L 8–23	1–1		
Eastern Final #2	Nov 20	at Toronto Argonauts	T 17–17	1–1–1		

== Awards and honours ==
- Garney Henley, CFL All-Star
- Leonard P. Back was elected into the Canadian Football Hall of Fame as a Builder, on November 25, 1971.
- Hal Patterson was elected into the Canadian Football Hall of Fame as a Player, on November 25, 1971
