= Fritz Hanson =

Canadian football player (1914–1996)

Profile
- Position: Halfback

Personal information
- Born: July 13, 1914; Perham, Minnesota, U.S.
- Died: February 14, 1996 (aged 81); Calgary, Alberta, Canada
- Listed weight: 145 lb (66 kg)

Career information
- College: North Dakota State

Career history
- 1935–1946: Winnipeg Winnipegs/Blue Bombers
- 1947–1948: Calgary Stampeders

Awards and highlights
- 4× Grey Cup champion (1935, 1939, 1941, 1948); 5× All-Western running back (1937–1941); Dave Dryburgh Memorial Trophy (1938); Lionel Conacher Award (1939); First-team Little All-American (1934); Most punt return yards in a Grey Cup game: 300 (1935)
- Canadian Football Hall of Fame (Class of 1963)

Melvin "Fritz" Hanson (July 13, 1914 – February 14, 1996) was a Canadian football player for the Winnipeg Blue Bombers and the Calgary Stampeders. Hanson was signed by the Blue Bombers for $125 a game and free room and board, which was a considerable sum in the cash-strapped dirty thirties. Nicknamed "the Galloping Ghost", "Twinkle Toes" and "the Perham Flash", Hanson was one of the pioneers of football in Western Canada and a huge star at the time. Although he weighed only 145 pounds (66 kg) he used his quickness to evade defenders. He helped lead the Blue Bombers to the first Grey Cup victory by a western Canadian team in 1935 and won again with the Bombers in 1939 and 1941. In the 1935 Grey Cup Game Hanson had 334 punt return yards on 13 returns, a record that still stands today, including a 78-yard return for the winning touchdown. He played with Winnipeg from 1935 through 1946 then spent two years playing for the Calgary Stampeders, where he won a fourth Grey Cup in 1948.

Hanson was elected into the Canadian Football Hall of Fame in 1963 and inducted into the Manitoba Sports Hall of Fame in 1980. He became a Canadian citizen in 1966 and, in 2005, Hanson was named one of the Blue Bombers 20 All-Time Greats. He died in Calgary on February 14, 1996, at the age of 81.

Hanson and his wife, Maxine, had four daughters.
