= 1936 Calgary Bronks season =

- Head coach: Carl Cronin
- Home stadium: Mewata Stadium

Results
- Record: 1–5 WIFU & 6–2 ARFU
- Division place: 3rd, WIFU & 1st, ARFU
- Playoffs: Lost WCRFU Finals

The 1936 season was the second season for the Calgary Bronks and it saw the team play a full schedule in both the Western Interprovincial Football Union and the Alberta Rugby Football Union. The Bronks finished third in the WIFU with a 1–5 record while they fared much better in the ARFU with a 6–2 record and a first-place finish. It was by virtue of the finish in the ARFU that the Calgary Bronks made the WCRFU playoffs.

== Regular season ==
=== WIFU ===
Due to prior commitments to play in the ARFU, the Calgary Bronks only had four weekends available to compete in the upstart Western Interprovincial Football Union. Two of the weekends available were the Labour Day and Thanksgiving Day long weekends. On the long weekends the Calgary Bronks played double headers against the Winnipegs. In an effort to bring fairness to the WIFU standings, Calgary's two remaining games against the Regina Roughriders were valued at 4 points in the standings.

=== ARFU ===
The Calgary Bronks played a full schedule in the Alberta Rugby Football Union including some games which conflicted with the WIFU schedule. For the open dates, the Bronks fielded the same team that was competing in the WIFU (5 games). For the remaining three games, the Bronks fielded a second team which was referred to as the Calgary Bronks 'B'. The final game of the regular season saw the Calgary Bronks square off against the University of Alberta Golden Bears. These teams were the two top teams in the ARFU so it was decided that in addition to being the final regular season game, the game would also determine the ARFU championship.

=== Standings ===
Note: GP = Games Played, W = Wins, L = Losses, T = Ties, PF = Points For, PA = Points Against, Pts = Points

Western Interprovincial Football Union
Team	GP	W	L	T	PF	PA	Pts
Winnipeg Blue Bombers	8	5	2	1	104	37	11
Regina Roughriders	6	3	2	1	52	42	9
Calgary Bronks	6	1	5	0	17	94	4

Alberta Rugby Football Union
Team	GP	W	L	T	PF	PA	Pts
Calgary Bronks "B" side	8	6	2	0	121	42	12
University of Alberta Golden Bears	6	4	2	0	30	20	8
Edmonton Hi-Grads	6	2	4	0	23	39	2
Lethbridge Lancers	6	1	5	0	14	87	2

- Calgary-Regina games were worth 4 points in the standings

=== WIFU schedule ===
Game	Date	Opponent	Results		Venue	Attendance
Game	Date	Opponent	Score	Record	Venue	Attendance
1	Sept 5	Winnipeg Blue Bombers	L 0–8	0–1		
2	Sept 7	Winnipeg Blue Bombers	L 0–26	0–2		
Bye
3	Sept 19	Regina Roughriders	L 2–18	0–3		
4	Sept 26	Regina Roughriders	W 9–3	1–3		
Bye
5	Oct 10	Winnipeg Blue Bombers	L 6–16	1–4		
6	Oct 12	Winnipeg Blue Bombers	L 0–23	1–5		

=== ARFU schedule ===
Game	Date	Opponent	Results		Venue	Attendance
Game	Date	Opponent	Score	Record	Venue	Attendance
1	Aug 29	Lethbridge Bulldogs	W 25–0	1–0		
2	Sept 12	Lethbridge Lancers	W 14–6	2–0		
3	Sept 19	Edmonton Hi-Grads	L 5–14	1–2		
4	Sept 30	Lethbridge Lancers	W 29–0	3–1		
5	Oct 3	Edmonton Hi-Grads	W 20–5	4–1		
6	Oct 12	Lethbridge Lancers	L 4–7	4–2		
7	Oct 17	Edmonton Hi-Grads	W 6–3	5–2		
8	Oct 24	University of Alberta	W 18–7	6–2		

== Playoffs ==
=== Qualifying for the WCFRU playoffs ===
Although the WIFU was considered to be top league in Western Canada, the WCRFU remained as the governing body for football in Western Canada. In years past, the playoffs saw the Alberta and British Columbia champions play each other in one semi final while the champions of Manitoba and Saskatchewan would play in the other semi final. In 1936, there were still provincial unions in BC, Alberta and Saskatchewan and the WCRFU declared that these teams had the right to compete for the Western Championship. When the 1936 season began, the WIFU wasn't a member of the WCRFU yet and these teams were not eligible to compete in the playoffs. An early season meeting of the WCRFU resulted in the existing playoff format carrying over for one more season with one amendment. The Regina Roughriders and Winnipegs would face each other in a playoff to determine who would fill hole vacated by the MRFU. It was also decided that if the Calgary Bronks were to qualify for the WCRFU playoffs, they would have to do so as champions of the ARFU. The decisions effectively rendered the WIFU regular season irrelevant as the WIFU league games would not affect whether a team made the playoffs. To give the WIFU season some significance, it was decided that if two WIFU teams met in the WCRFU playoffs that the points differential in the WIFU standings would carry forward into the playoff series. Thus, when the Calgary Bronks met the Regina Roughriders in the WCRFU final, the Roughriders began the game with a 5-0 lead. (The maximum amount that could be carried forward was converted touchdown or six points)

=== WCRFU playoffs ===
As champions of the ARFU, the Calgary Bronks were scheduled to play the BCRFU champions in the Alberta-British Columbia semi final on November 7, 1936. Unlike on the prairies where the season was moved forward into September to create a longer season, the BCRFU extended its season through November. As the semi-final was scheduled in the middle of the BCRFU season, the BCRFU decided to withdraw from competition. Calgary gained a free pass to the WCRFU final against the Regina Roughriders. For the WCRFU final, the Regina Roughriders began the game with a 5-0 lead due to the five point difference between the teams in the WIFU standings. Calgary had one chance to score points in the first quarter but they turned the ball over on third down as they needed a touchdown. The Regina Roughriders dominated the remainder of the game, outscoring the Calgary Bronks by a 3-1 margin. The final score was officially 8-1.

=== Results ===
Round	Date	Opponent	Results		Venue	Attendance
Round	Date	Opponent	Score	Record	Venue	Attendance
WCRFU Final	Nov 11	Regina Roughriders	L 1–8	0–1		

- Regina started the game with a 5-0 lead and outscored Calgary 3-1 during the game.
