= 1937 Calgary Bronks season =

- Head coach: Carl Cronin
- Home stadium: Mewata Stadium

Results
- Record: 5–3
- Division place: 1st, W.I.F.U.
- Playoffs: Lost W.I.F.U. Finals

The 1937 Calgary Bronks season marked the team's third season in franchise history, during which they finished in first place in the Western Interprovincial Football Union with a 5–3 record. The Bronks played in the WIFU Finals, but lost to the Winnipeg Blue Bombers in a two-game series by a total points score of 19–14.

== Regular season ==
=== Standings ===
Western Interprovincial Football Union
| Team | GP | W | L | T | PF | PA | Pts |
|---|---|---|---|---|---|---|---|
| Calgary Bronks | 8 | 5 | 3 | 0 | 47 | 70 | 10 |
| Winnipeg Blue Bombers | 8 | 4 | 4 | 0 | 57 | 47 | 8 |
| Regina Roughriders | 8 | 3 | 5 | 0 | 58 | 45 | 6 |

=== Schedule ===
| Game | Date | Opponent | Results | | Venue | Attendance |
| Game | Date | Opponent | Score | Record | Venue | Attendance |
|---|---|---|---|---|---|---|
| 1 | Sept 4 | Winnipeg Blue Bombers | W 13–8 | 1–0 | | |
| 2 | Sept 6 | Regina Roughriders | W 4–1 | 2–0 | | |
| 3 | Sept 11 | Winnipeg Blue Bombers | L 1–11 | 2–1 | | |
| 4 | Sept 18 | Regina Roughriders | W 8–7 | 3–1 | | |
Bye
| 5 | Oct 2 | Regina Roughriders | W 11–0 | 4–1 | | |
| 6 | Oct 11 | Winnipeg Blue Bombers | W 7–1 | 5–1 | | |
| 7 | Oct 16 | Winnipeg Blue Bombers | L 2–16 | 5–2 | | |
| 8 | Oct 23 | Regina Roughriders | L 1–26 | 5–3 | | |
Bye

== Playoffs ==
| Round | Date | Opponent | Results | | Venue | Attendance |
| Round | Date | Opponent | Score | Record | Venue | Attendance |
|---|---|---|---|---|---|---|
| WIFU Finals | Nov 6 | Winnipeg Blue Bombers | W 13–10 | 1–0 | | |
| WIFU Finals | Nov 11 | Winnipeg Blue Bombers | L 1–9 | 1–1 | | |

- Winnipeg won the total-point series by 19–14. Winnipeg advances to the Grey Cup game.
