= 1938 Winnipeg Blue Bombers season =

Canadian football team season

- General manager: Joe Ryan
- Head coach: Reg Threlfall
- Home stadium: Osborne Stadium

Results
- Record: 6–2
- Division place: 2nd, WIFU
- Playoffs: Lost Grey Cup

The 1938 Winnipeg Blue Bombers was the ninth season of the franchise. They finished second in the Western Interprovincial Football Union. It was the first under Reg Threlfall as head coach. They won the Union finals but lost in the Grey Cup.

== Regular season ==
=== Standings ===
Western Interprovincial Football Union
Team	GP	W	L	T	PF	PA	Pts
Calgary Bronks	8	6	2	0	50	27	12
Winnipeg Blue Bombers	8	6	2	0	114	63	12
Regina Roughriders	8	4	4	0	69	55	8
Edmonton Eskimos	8	0	8	0	29	117	0

== Playoffs ==
=== Semifinals ===
WIFU Semifinals
Date	Away	Home
October 29	Regina Roughriders 0	Winnipeg Blue Bombers 13

=== Finals ===
Western Finals
Game	Date	Away	Home
1	November 5	Winnipeg Blue Bombers 12	Calgary Bronks 7
2	November 12	Calgary Bronks 2	Winnipeg Blue Bombers 13

- Winnipeg won the total-point series by 25–9. Winnipeg advances to the Grey Cup game.

=== Grey Cup ===
Team	Q1	Q2	Q3	Q4	Total
Winnipeg Blue Bombers	4	3	0	0	7
Toronto Argonauts	0	5	1	24	30
