= 1971 Toronto Argonauts season =

CFL team season

- Head coach: Leo Cahill
- Home stadium: Exhibition Stadium

Results
- Record: 10–4
- Division place: 1st, East
- Playoffs: Lost Grey Cup

The 1971 Toronto Argonauts finished in first place in the Eastern Conference with a 10–4 record. They appeared in the Grey Cup.

== Regular season ==
=== Standings ===
Eastern Football Conference
Team	GP	W	L	T	PF	PA	Pts
Toronto Argonauts	14	10	4	0	289	248	20
Hamilton Tiger-Cats	14	7	7	0	242	246	14
Ottawa Rough Riders	14	6	8	0	291	277	12
Montreal Alouettes	14	6	8	0	226	248	12

=== Schedule ===
Week	Game	Date	Opponent	Results		Venue	Attendance
Week	Game	Date	Opponent	Score	Record	Venue	Attendance
1	1	Wed, July 28	vs. Winnipeg Blue Bombers	W 21–20	1–0	Exhibition Stadium	33,135
2	2	Fri, Aug 6	vs. Saskatchewan Roughriders	W 22–17	2–0	Exhibition Stadium	33,135
3	3	Thu, Aug 12	at Montreal Alouettes	W 26–14	3–0	Autostade	29,609
4	4	Thu, Aug 19	vs. Ottawa Rough Riders	W 30–28	4–0	Exhibition Stadium	33,135
5	5	Sun, Aug 29	vs. BC Lions	L 24–27	4–1	Empire Stadium	30,242
6	6	Wed, Sept 1	at Edmonton Eskimos	W 16–15	5–1	Clarke Stadium	22,261
6	7	Mon, Sept 6	at Hamilton Tiger-Cats	L 17–30	5–2	Ivor Wynne Stadium	34,535
7	8	Sun, Sept 12	vs. Hamilton Tiger-Cats	W 23–14	6–2	Exhibition Stadium	33,135
8	9	Sun, Sept 19	at Ottawa Rough Riders	W 26–17	7–2	Lansdowne Park	26,063
9	10	Sat, Sept 25	vs. Calgary Stampeders	W 18–7	8–2	Exhibition Stadium	33,135
10	11	Sun, Oct 3	at Ottawa Rough Riders	W 12–3	9–2	Lansdowne Park	21,868
11	12	Sun, Oct 10	at Montreal Alouettes	W 32–5	10–2	Autostade	22,470
12	13	Sun, Oct 17	vs. Montreal Alouettes	L 7–28	10–3	Exhibition Stadium	33,135
13	Bye						
14	14	Sun, Oct 31	vs. Hamilton Tiger-Cats	L 15–23	10–4	Exhibition Stadium	33,135

== Postseason ==
Round	Date	Opponent	Results		Venue	Attendance
Round	Date	Opponent	Score	Record	Venue	Attendance
East Final Game 1	Sun, Nov 14	at Hamilton Tiger-Cats	W 23–8	1–0	Ivor Wynne Stadium	33,392
East Final Game 2	Sat, Nov 20	vs. Hamilton Tiger-Cats	T 17–17	1–0–1	Exhibition Stadium	33,135
Grey Cup	Sun, Nov 28	vs. Calgary Stampeders	L 11–14	1–1–1	Empire Stadium	34,484

=== Grey Cup ===
Teams	Q1	Q2	Q3	Q4	Total
Calgary Stampeders	7	7	0	0	14
Toronto Argonauts	0	3	8	0	11

== Awards and honors ==
- Annis Stukus Trophy – Leo Cahill
- 1971 CFL All-Stars, RB – Leon McQuay
- 1971 CFL All-Stars, TE – Mel Profit
