= 1971 BC Lions season =

Canadian football team season

- General manager: Jackie Parker
- Head coach: Eagle Keys
- Home stadium: Empire Stadium

Results
- Record: 6–9–1
- Division place: 4th, West
- Playoffs: did not qualify

Uniform

The 1971 BC Lions finished in fourth place in the Western Conference, with a 6–9–1 record, and failed to make the playoffs.

On January 1, Eagle Keys was hired as head coach after coaching Saskatchewan to four consecutive 12+ win seasons, including a 14–2 record in 1970. However, the Lions did not have the talent that the Roughriders had accumulated, and the Lions had a second consecutive 6-win season.

Jim Evenson had another outstanding season and finally won the CFL rushing title, with 1247 yards rushing, and was the lone Lion on the CFL all-star team.

During the season rookie Don Moorhead gradually won the starting quarterback job due to injuries and performance issues with incumbent 3-year starter Paul Brothers (who was traded to Ottawa late in the season) and backup Tom Wilkinson.

Carl Weathers, who later became better known as an actor, joined the team as a linebacker and was on the Lions roster until 1973.

For the season, the Lions helmet had a special logo celebrating British Columbia's centennial. The Canadian Confederacy Centennial logo has three orange Cs linked with a small white Pacific dogwood flower at the centre.

== Offseason ==
=== CFL draft ===
Round	Pick	Player	Position	School

== Roster ==
1971 BC Lions roster
Quarterbacks: Howard Clark; Don Moorhead; Running backs Wide receivers Slotbacks	Offensive linemen: Max Huber T; Defensive linemen	Linebackers Defensive backs Special teams	Inactive list Practice roster Italics indicate import players.

== Preseason ==
Game	Date	Opponent	Results		Venue	Attendance
Game	Date	Opponent	Score	Record	Venue	Attendance

== Regular season ==
=== Season standings ===
Western Football Conference
Team	GP	W	L	T	PF	PA	Pts
Calgary Stampeders	16	9	6	1	290	218	19
Saskatchewan Roughriders	16	9	6	1	347	316	19
Winnipeg Blue Bombers	16	7	8	1	366	349	15
BC Lions	16	6	9	1	282	363	13
Edmonton Eskimos	16	6	10	0	237	305	12

=== Season schedule ===
Game	Date	Opponent	Results	
Game	Date	Opponent	Score	Record
1	July 27	vs. Saskatchewan Roughriders	L 10–14	0–1
2	Aug 4	at Edmonton Eskimos	L 19–20	0–2
3	Aug 9	at Winnipeg Blue Bombers	W 29–16	1–2
4	Aug 18	vs. Edmonton Eskimos	W 11–1	2–2
5	Aug 24	at Calgary Stampeders	L 1–32	2–3
6	Aug 29	vs. Toronto Argonauts	W 27–24	3–3
7	Sept 6	at Saskatchewan Roughriders	L 14–35	3–4
8	Sept 12	vs. Calgary Stampeders	L 10–25	3–5
9	Sept 19	at Winnipeg Blue Bombers	T 31–31	3–5–1
10	Sept 25	vs. Winnipeg Blue Bombers	W 25–18	4–5–1
11	Oct 2	vs. Montreal Alouettes	W 28–0	5–5–1
12	Oct 9	at Ottawa Rough Riders	L 21–45	5–6–1
13	Oct 11	at Hamilton Tiger-Cats	L 3–36	5–7–1
14	Oct 16	vs. Edmonton Eskimos	L 4–9	5–8–1
15	Oct 24	at Saskatchewan Roughriders	L 14–50	5–9–1
16	Oct 30	vs. Calgary Stampeders	W 31–7	6–9–1

=== Offensive leaders ===
Player	Passing yds	Rushing yds	Receiving yds	TD
Don Moorhead	1302	349	26	1
Jim Evenson		1237	77	8
Jim Young		220	593	7
Larry Highbaugh		327	488	5

== Awards and records ==
=== 1971 CFL All-Stars ===
- RB – Jim Evenson, CFL All-Star
