= Art Darch =

Canadian gridiron football player (1931–2013)

Profile
- Position: Guard

Personal information
- Born: October 15, 1931; Niagara Falls, Ontario, Canada
- Died: April 2, 2013 (aged 81); Hamilton, Ontario, Canada
- Listed height: 5 ft 10 in (1.78 m)
- Listed weight: 170 lb (77 kg)

Career history
- 1952–1960: Hamilton Tiger-Cats
- 1960–1961: Toronto Argonauts

Awards and highlights
- 2× Grey Cup champion (1953, 1957)

Arthur Clifford Darch (October 15, 1931 – April 2, 2013) was a Canadian professional football player who played for the Hamilton Tiger-Cats and Toronto Argonauts. He won the Grey Cup with Hamilton in 1953. He previously played football at Stamford Collegiate in his hometown of Niagara Falls.

After his football career he worked in the insurance industry and with CBC Television. He is a member of the Niagara Falls Sports Wall of Fame. Darch died in 2013 in Hamilton.
