= Art Stevenson =

American gridiron football player (1916–2000)

No. 52
- Position: Running back

Personal information
- Born: May 30, 1916; Gothenburg, Nebraska, U.S.
- Died: September 21, 2000 (aged 84); Phoenix, Arizona, U.S.

Career information
- College: Hastings College

Career history
- 1937–1941: Winnipeg Blue Bombers

Awards and highlights
- 2× Grey Cup champion( 1939, 1941); 4× CFL All-Star (1937, 38, 40, 41)
- Canadian Football Hall of Fame (Class of 1969)

Arthur C. Stevenson (May 30, 1916 – September 21, 2000) was an American professional football running back who played five seasons for the Winnipeg Blue Bombers of the Canadian Football League (CFL). He helped the Blue Bombers to Grey Cup championships in 1939 and 1941. Stevenson was inducted into the Canadian Football Hall of Fame in 1969.

Stevenson played for the Blue Bombers while attending the University of Manitoba College of Medicine. After limited playing time in his first two seasons, he became a starter in 1939. He was the team's leading passer and also punted. He suffered a leg injury in the 1941 western finals and missed that year's Grey Cup game, which Winnipeg won. He never played again, as the following year he enlisted in the Royal Canadian Army Medical Corps. He also coached the 1942 Manitoba Bisons football team. In 1943, he was transferred to Ottawa and was offered a chance to play with the Ottawa Combines, but he decided to stay retired.
