= 1935 Calgary Bronks season =

- Head coach: Carl Cronin
- Home stadium: Mewata Stadium

Results
- Record: 2–0
- Division place: 1st, ARFU
- Playoffs: Lost Western Title Game

The 1935 Calgary Bronks season was the first in franchise history where the team finished in first place in the Alberta Rugby Football Union with a 2–0 division record. The Bronks played in the Western Title game, but lost to the eventual Grey Cup champion, the Winnipegs.

== Exhibition games ==
| Date | Opponent | Results | | Venue | Attendance |
| Date | Opponent | Score | Record | Venue | Attendance |
|---|---|---|---|---|---|
| Sept 4 | vs. Sarnia Imperials (ORFU) | L 0–39 | 0–1 | | |
| Sept 11 | vs. Sarnia Imperials (ORFU) | L 2–17 | 0–2 | | |
| Sept 21 | vs. Regina Roughriders | L 1–7 | 0–3 | | |
| Oct 5 | at Regina Roughriders | L 0–23 | 0–4 | | |
| Oct 24 | vs. Edmonton Hi-Grads | W 31–3 | 1–4 | | |

== Regular season ==
=== Standings ===
Alberta Rugby Football Union
| Team | GP | W | L | T | PF | PA | Pts |
|---|---|---|---|---|---|---|---|
| Calgary Bronks | 2 | 2 | 0 | 0 | 66 | 10 | 4 |
| University of Alberta | 2 | 0 | 2 | 0 | 10 | 66 | 0 |

=== Schedule ===
| Date | Opponent | Results | | Venue | Attendance |
| Date | Opponent | Score | Record | Venue | Attendance |
|---|---|---|---|---|---|
| Oct 9 | vs. University of Alberta | W 26–0 | 1–0 | | |
| Oct 19 | at University of Alberta | W 40–10 | 2–0 | | |

== Playoffs ==
| Round | Date | Opponent | Results | | Venue | Attendance |
| Round | Date | Opponent | Score | Record | Venue | Attendance |
|---|---|---|---|---|---|---|
| Western Semi-Final | Nov 2 | vs. Vancouver Meralomas | W 14–0 | 1–0 | | |
| Western Title Game | Nov 9 | at Winnipeg Winnipegs | L 0–7 | 1–1 | | |

== See also ==
List of Calgary Bronks (football) seasons
