= 1971 Ottawa Rough Riders season =

Canadian football team season

- Owner: David Loeb
- General manager: Frank Clair
- Head coach: Jack Gotta
- Home stadium: Lansdowne Park

Results
- Record: 6–8
- Division place: 3rd, East
- Playoffs: Lost Eastern Semi-Final

Uniform

The 1971 Ottawa Rough Riders finished the season in third place in the Eastern Conference with a 6–8 record and lost in the Eastern Semi-Final game to the Hamilton Tiger-Cats.

== Preseason ==
Game	Date	Opponent	Results		Venue	Attendance
Game	Date	Opponent	Score	Record	Venue	Attendance
A	July 5	vs. Winnipeg Blue Bombers	L 17–19	0–1		
B	July 9	at Edmonton Eskimos	W 5–1	1–1		
B	July 12	at BC Lions	W 41–14	2–1		
C	July 19	vs. BC Lions	L 20–22	2–2		

== Regular season ==
=== Standings ===
Eastern Football Conference
Team	GP	W	L	T	PF	PA	Pts
Toronto Argonauts	14	10	4	0	289	248	20
Hamilton Tiger-Cats	14	7	7	0	242	246	14
Ottawa Rough Riders	14	6	8	0	291	277	12
Montreal Alouettes	14	6	8	0	226	248	12

=== Schedule ===
Week	Game	Date	Opponent	Results		Venue	Attendance
Week	Game	Date	Opponent	Score	Record	Venue	Attendance
1	1	July 27	vs. Edmonton Eskimos	W 22–11	1–0		
2	2	Aug 2	at Winnipeg Blue Bombers	W 28–22	2–0		
2	3	Aug 4	at Calgary Stampeders	L 8–9	2–1		
3	4	Aug 11	vs. Hamilton Tiger-Cats	L 17–20	2–2		
4	5	Aug 19	at Toronto Argonauts	L 28–30	2–3		
5	6	Aug 27	at Saskatchewan Roughriders	L 21–42	2–4		
6	7	Sept 6	vs. Montreal Alouettes	W 40–17	3–4		
7	8	Sept 11	at Montreal Alouettes	L 6–25	3–5		
8	9	Sept 19	vs. Toronto Argonauts	L 17–26	3–6		
9	10	Sept 26	at Hamilton Tiger-Cats	L 7–19	3–7		
10	11	Oct 3	vs. Toronto Argonauts	L 3–12	3–8		
11	12	Oct 9	vs. BC Lions	W 45–21	4–8		
12	Bye						
13	13	Oct 23	at Hamilton Tiger-Cats	W 40–16	5–8		
14	14	Oct 30	vs. Montreal Alouettes	W 9–7	6–8		

== Postseason ==
Round	Date	Opponent	Results		Venue	Attendance
Round	Date	Opponent	Score	Record	Venue	Attendance
East Semi-Final	Nov 7	at Hamilton Tiger-Cats	L 4–23	0–1		

=== Player stats ===
==== Passing ====
Player	Attempts	Completions	Pct.	Yards	Touchdowns	Interceptions
Rick Cassata	181	77	42.5	1100	7	14

=== Awards and honours ===
- Jerry Campbell, Linebacker, CFL All-Star
