= Toar Springstein =

Profile
- Positions: Tackle, Kicker

Personal information
- Born: December 11, 1918; Regina, Saskatchewan, Canada
- Died: April 10, 1987 (aged 68); Regina, Saskatchewan, Canada
- Listed height: 6 ft 2 in (1.88 m)
- Listed weight: 260 lb (118 kg)

Career information
- College: Manitoba

Career history
- 1939–1941: Saskatchewan Roughriders
- 1946–1952: Saskatchewan Roughriders

Awards and highlights
- 2× CFL West All-Star (1940, 1949)

Clarence Earl "Toar" Springstein (December 11, 1918 – April 10, 1987) was a Canadian professional football player who played for the Saskatchewan Roughriders. In 1990, he was included on the Roughriders' Plaza of Honour.
