= 1939 Toronto Argonauts season =

CFL team season

- Head coach: Lew Hayman
- Home stadium: Varsity Stadium

Results
- Record: 4–1–1
- Division place: 2nd, IRFU
- Playoffs: Lost IRFU Final

The 1939 Toronto Argonauts season was the 53rd season for the team since the franchise's inception in 1873. The team finished in second place in the Interprovincial Rugby Football Union with a 4–1–1 record and qualified for the playoffs, but lost the two-game total-points IRFU Final series to the Ottawa Rough Riders.

== Preseason ==
The Argonauts participated in the 1939 city of Toronto championship series, winning the competition with victories over Balmy Beach and the University of Toronto varsity team.

Game	Date	Opponent	Results		Venue	Attendance
Game	Date	Opponent	Score	Record	Venue	Attendance
A	September 23	Toronto Balmy Beach	W 24–12	1–0	Varsity Stadium	6,000
B	September 30	University of Toronto Blues	W 21–3	2–0	Varsity Stadium	3,000

== Regular season ==
=== Standings ===
Interprovincial Rugby Football Union
Team	GP	W	L	T	PF	PA	Pts
Ottawa Rough Riders	6	5	1	0	145	44	10
Toronto Argonauts	6	4	1	1	58	43	9
Hamilton Tigers	6	2	4	0	29	84	4
Montreal Royals	6	0	5	1	23	84	1

=== Schedule ===
Game	Date	Opponent	Results	
Game	Date	Opponent	Score	Record
1	Oct 7	vs. Montreal Royals	W 7–2	1–0
2	Oct 14	at Hamilton Tigers	W 16–1	2–0
3	Oct 21	vs. Ottawa Rough Riders	L 7–18	2–1
4	Oct 28	at Ottawa Rough Riders	W 13–8	3–1
5	Nov 4	vs. Hamilton Tigers	W 9–8	4–1
6	Nov 11	at Montreal Royals	T 6–6	4–1–1

== Postseason ==
Round	Date	Opponent	Results		Venue
Round	Date	Opponent	Score	Record	Venue
IRFU Final Game 1	Nov 18	at Ottawa Rough Riders	L 0–11	0–1	Lansdowne Park
IRFU Final Game 2	Nov 25	vs. Ottawa Rough Riders	L 6–28	0–2	Varsity Stadium
