= Sarnia 2/26 Battery =

Former Canadian football team in Sarnia, Canada

- Founded: 1940
- Folded: 1940
- Based in: Sarnia, Ontario
- League: Ontario Rugby Football Union

Sarnia 2/26 Battery was the name of a Canadian football team in Ontario Rugby Football Union. The team played in the 1940 season. The ORFU had several teams disband due to the war in 1940, and Sarnia 2/26 Battery was one of the teams quickly recruited for the 1940 season (at the instigation of Lt. Hugh Sterling.)

== Notable players ==
- Nick Paithouski

== ORFU season-by-season ==
Season	W	L	T	PF	PA	Pts	Finish	Playoffs
1940	4	2	0	59	36	8	2nd, ORFU	Lost Playoff
