= 1953 Calgary Stampeders season =

Canadian football team season

- Head coach: Bob Snyder
- Home stadium: Mewata Stadium

Results
- Record: 3–12–1
- Division place: 4th
- Playoffs: did not qualify

The 1953 Calgary Stampeders finished in fourth place in the W.I.F.U. with a 3–12–1 record and failed to make the playoffs.

== Regular season ==
=== Season standings ===
Western Interprovincial Football Union
| Team | GP | W | L | T | PF | PA | Pts |
|---|---|---|---|---|---|---|---|
| Edmonton Eskimos | 16 | 12 | 4 | 0 | 276 | 157 | 24 |
| Saskatchewan Roughriders | 16 | 8 | 7 | 1 | 243 | 239 | 17 |
| Winnipeg Blue Bombers | 16 | 8 | 8 | 0 | 226 | 226 | 16 |
| Calgary Stampeders | 16 | 3 | 12 | 1 | 190 | 313 | 7 |

=== Season schedule ===
| Week | Game | Date | Opponent | Results | | Venue | Attendance |
| Week | Game | Date | Opponent | Score | Record | Venue | Attendance |
|---|---|---|---|---|---|---|---|
| | 1 | Sat, Aug 29 | at Saskatchewan Roughriders | W 29–17 | 1–0 | Taylor Field | 14,000 |
| | 2 | Mon, Aug 31 | at Winnipeg Blue Bombers | L 10–16 | 1–1 | Winnipeg Stadium | 16,108 |
| | 3 | Sat, Sept 5 | vs. Edmonton Eskimos | L 6–18 | 1–2 | Mewata Stadium | 15,000 |
| | 4 | Mon, Sept 7 | at Edmonton Eskimos | L 5–19 | 1–3 | Clarke Stadium | 15,500 |
| | 5 | Sat, Sept 12 | vs. Winnipeg Blue Bombers | W 23–14 | 2–3 | Mewata Stadium | 12,000 |
| | 6 | Mon, Sept 14 | vs. Saskatchewan Roughriders | L 2–34 | 2–4 | Mewata Stadium | 14,000 |
| | 7 | Sat, Sept 19 | at Winnipeg Blue Bombers | L 15–16 | 2–5 | Winnipeg Stadium | 16,578 |
| | 8 | Sat, Sept 26 | at Edmonton Eskimos | L 6–15 | 2–6 | Clarke Stadium | 15,000 |
| | 9 | Mon, Sept 28 | vs. Edmonton Eskimos | L 12–21 | 2–7 | Mewata Stadium | 12,000 |
| | 10 | Sat, Oct 3 | at Winnipeg Blue Bombers | L 17–24 | 2–8 | Winnipeg Stadium | 16,548 |
| | 11 | Mon, Oct 5 | at Saskatchewan Roughriders | W 9–8 | 3–8 | Taylor Field | 11,116 |
| | 12 | Sat, Oct 10 | vs. Edmonton Eskimos | L 13–34 | 3–9 | Mewata Stadium | |
| | 13 | Mon, Oct 12 | at Edmonton Eskimos | L 6–22 | 3–10 | Clarke Stadium | 15,500 |
| | 14 | Sat, Oct 17 | vs. Saskatchewan Roughriders | L 18–24 | 3–11 | Mewata Stadium | 12,000 |
| | 15 | Mon, Oct 19 | vs. Winnipeg Blue Bombers | L 6–18 | 3–12 | Mewata Stadium | 10,000 |
| | 16 | Sat, Oct 24 | vs. Saskatchewan Roughriders | T 13–13 | 3–12–1 | Mewata Stadium | 10,000 |

== Awards and records ==
- Jeff Nicklin Memorial Trophy – John Henry Johnson
