= Frank Hannibal =

Francis John Hannibal (September 23, 1892 – March 26, 1959) was an English-born Canadian football executive who was president of the Winnipeg Rugby Football Club (now the Winnipeg Blue Bombers) from 1934 to 1936 and in 1941 and president of the Western Interprovincial Football Union from 1938 to 1939.

== Early life ==
Hannibal was born on September 23, 1892 in Bristol. His family immigrated to Canada in 1903 and settled in Toronto. During World War I, Hannibal was an officer with the Royal Regiment of Canadian Artillery. He served with the 12th Infantry Brigade and 2nd Canadian Infantry Brigade in France and was wounded during the Second Battle of Passchendaele. After the War, he worked a sales manager for Canada Bread Company, first in Ottawa, then in Winnipeg.

== Sports ==
Hannibal moved to Winnipeg in 1930 and began working with the Winnipeg Rugby Football Club soon thereafter. He became president of the team in 1934 and helped build the club that won the following year's Grey Cup. During the 1938 and 1939 seasons, he was president of Western Interprovincial Football Union. He returned to the Blue Bombers' presidency in 1941 and led the team to another Grey Cup victory. From 1942 to 1944, Hannibal was the president of the Manitoba Amateur Hockey Association.

Hannibal was inducted into the Canadian Football Hall of Fame in 1963 and the Winnipeg Blue Bombers Hall of Fame in 1984.

== Personal life ==
Hannibal married Johanna Gudrun Hjorleifson on June 26, 1937. They had one daughter. He died on March 26, 1959 while on vacation in Miami.
