= 1939 Calgary Bronks season =

- Head coach: Dick Haughian
- Home stadium: Mewata Stadium

Results
- Record: 4–7
- Division place: 3rd, W.I.F.U.
- Playoffs: Lost W.I.F.U. Finals

The 1939 Calgary Bronks season was the fifth season in franchise history where the team finished in third place in the Western Interprovincial Football Union with a 4–7 record. The Bronks played in the WIFU Finals, but lost to the Winnipeg Blue Bombers in a two-game series by a total points score of 35–20.

== Regular season ==
=== Standings ===
Western Interprovincial Football Union
Team	GP	W	L	T	PF	PA	Pts
Winnipeg Blue Bombers	12	10	2	0	201	103	20
Regina Roughriders	12	6	6	0	84	136	12
Calgary Bronks	11	4	7	0	144	123	8
Edmonton Eskimos	11	3	8	0	80	147	6

=== Schedule ===
Game	Date	Opponent	Results		Venue	Attendance
Game	Date	Opponent	Score	Record	Venue	Attendance
1	Aug 25	vs. Winnipeg Blue Bombers	L 1–12	0–1		
2	Sept 4	at Edmonton Eskimos	L 12–16	0–2		
3	Sept 8	vs. Edmonton Eskimos	W 16–3	1–2		
4	Sept 15	at Winnipeg Blue Bombers	L 18–19	1–3		
5	Sept 18	at Regina Roughriders	W 12–3	2–3		
6	Sept 22	vs. Regina Roughriders	W 24–0	3–3		
7	Sept 30	at Winnipeg Blue Bombers	L 6–25	3–4		
8	Oct 6	vs. Winnipeg Blue Bombers	L 17–19	3–5		
9	Oct 9	vs. Regina Roughriders	L 6–25	3–6		
10	Oct 14	at Regina Roughriders	L 11–12	3–7		
11	Oct 21	vs. Edmonton Eskimos	W 18–8	4–7		
12	Oct 28	at Edmonton Eskimos	Game canceled	4–7		

== Playoffs ==
Round	Date	Opponent	Results		Venue	Attendance
Round	Date	Opponent	Score	Record	Venue	Attendance
WIFU Semi-Final	Nov 4	Regina Roughriders	W 24–17	1–0		
WIFU Finals Game 1	Nov 11	Winnipeg Blue Bombers	W 13–7	2–0		
WIFU Finals Game 2	Nov 18	Winnipeg Blue Bombers	L 7–28	2–1		

- Winnipeg won the total-point series by 35–20. Winnipeg advances to the Grey Cup game.
