= John McKee (actor) =

American film and television actor

- Born: December 30, 1916; San Luis Obispo, California, U.S.
- Died: May 12, 2013 (aged 96); Vineland, New Jersey, U.S.
- Occupation: Actor
- Years active: 1945–1983
- Football career

Profile
- Position: Center

Career information
- High school: Audubon
- College: Villanova

Career history
- Calgary Bronks (1939)*
- * Offseason or practice squad member only

John R. McKee (December 30, 1916 – May 12, 2013) was an American film and television actor.

== Life and career ==
McKee was born in San Luis Obispo, California. He attended and graduated from Audubon High School. He played college football as a center for the Villanova Wildcats at Villanova University, and played for the Calgary Bronks in 1939. He served in the United States Army Air Corps during World War II. During his military service, he served as a lieutenant and was reported missing in 1943, but was later found in England. He was awarded a Purple Heart when the plane he piloted was shot down over France. He began his screen career in 1945, appearing in the film The House on 92nd Street. In 1947, he coached the Pittsburgh Pirates. In 1948, he appeared in the films Loaded Pistols and The Dark Past.

Later in his career, McKee guest-starred in numerous television programs including Bonanza, Wagon Train, Perry Mason, The Six Million Dollar Man, The Jack Benny Program, The Tall Man, Maverick, Cheyenne, Shotgun Slade, The High Chaparral, Leave It to Beaver and Bourbon Street Beat. He also appeared in numerous films Cape Fear, A Gathering of Eagles, The Shakiest Gun in the West, That Touch of Mink, The Gallant Hours, The Affairs of Dobie Gillis, Texans Never Cry, Twelve O'Clock High, Johnny Dark, Sunrise at Campobello and 40 Pounds of Trouble.

McKee retired from acting in 1983, last appearing in the television film Dempsey.

== Death ==
McKee died on May 12, 2013, in Vineland, New Jersey, at the age of 96.
