= Nick Paithouski =

Profile
- Position: Center

Personal information
- Born: c. 1918; Sarnia, Ontario
- Died: September 15, 1985 (aged 67); Ottawa, Ontario, Canada

Career information
- College: Queen's University

Career history
- 1940: Sarnia 2/26 Battery
- 1941: Saskatchewan Roughriders
- 1945–47: Hamilton Tigers

Awards and highlights
- CFL All-Star (1940); Imperial Oil Trophy (1940)

Nicholas Joseph Paithouski (c. 1918 – September 15, 1985) was a Canadian professional footballer who was an all-star center in the Ontario Rugby Football Union.

A graduate of Queen's University, he was a star player with the Golden Gaels, twice selected as a team MVP. In 1940 he joined the Sarnia 2/26 Battery team of the ORFU and it was a successful season: he was an all-star, and he won the Imperial Oil Trophy as MVP in the ORFU. He joined the Saskatchewan Roughriders for the 1941 season.

Paithouski joined the Royal Canadian Engineers and served during World War II, receiving a Bronze Star from the American Army. He also had the good fortune to play in the famed Tea Bowl for the Canadian Army football team against American Army team at White City Stadium on February 13, 1944 in London, England (the Canadians won 16–6).

After the war he played with the Hamilton Tigers for 3 seasons. He later worked as a civil engineer for the Federal government, living in Ottawa with his wife Barbara (1917-1976) and their two children, Janet and Joe. He was inducted into the Sarnia Lambton Sports Hall of Fame in 1984 and the Queen's University Football Hall of Fame in 1987. He died September 15, 1985 at the age of 67.
