= Bruce Barron =

American explorer and photographer

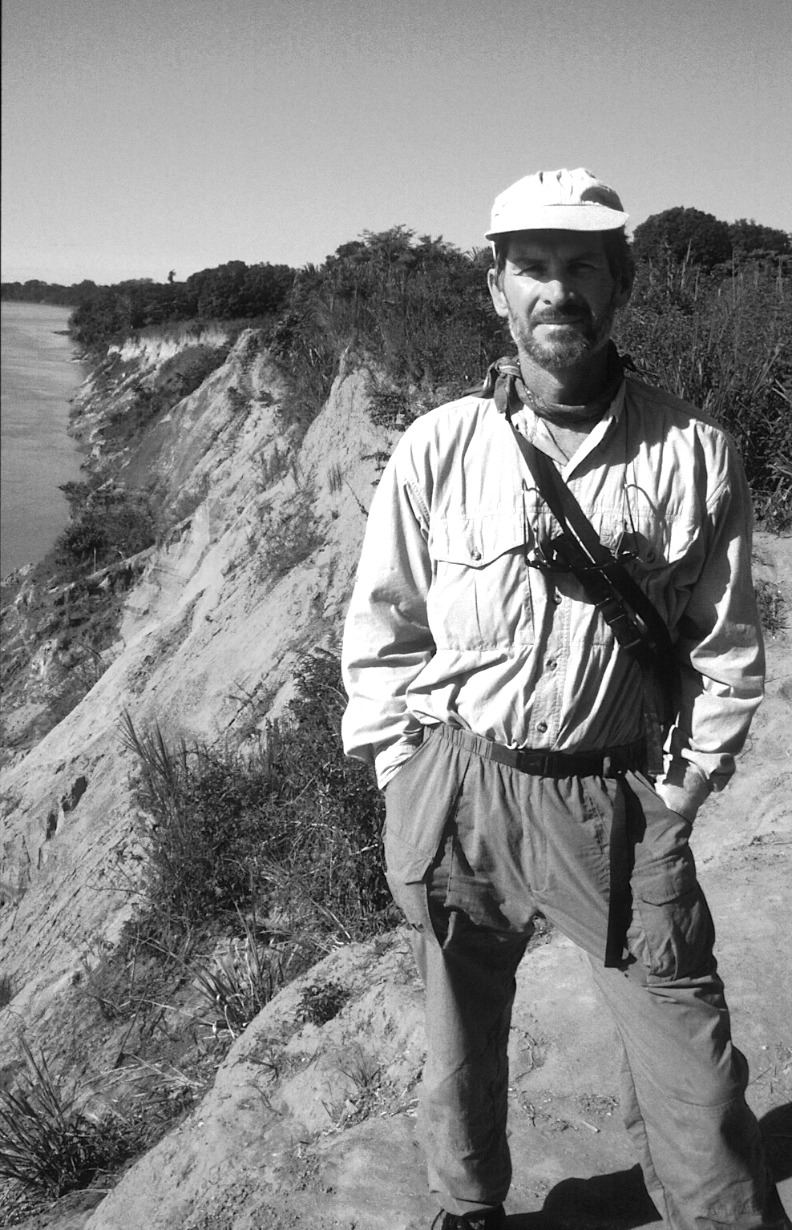
Bruce Barron, Heath River, Peru Amazon

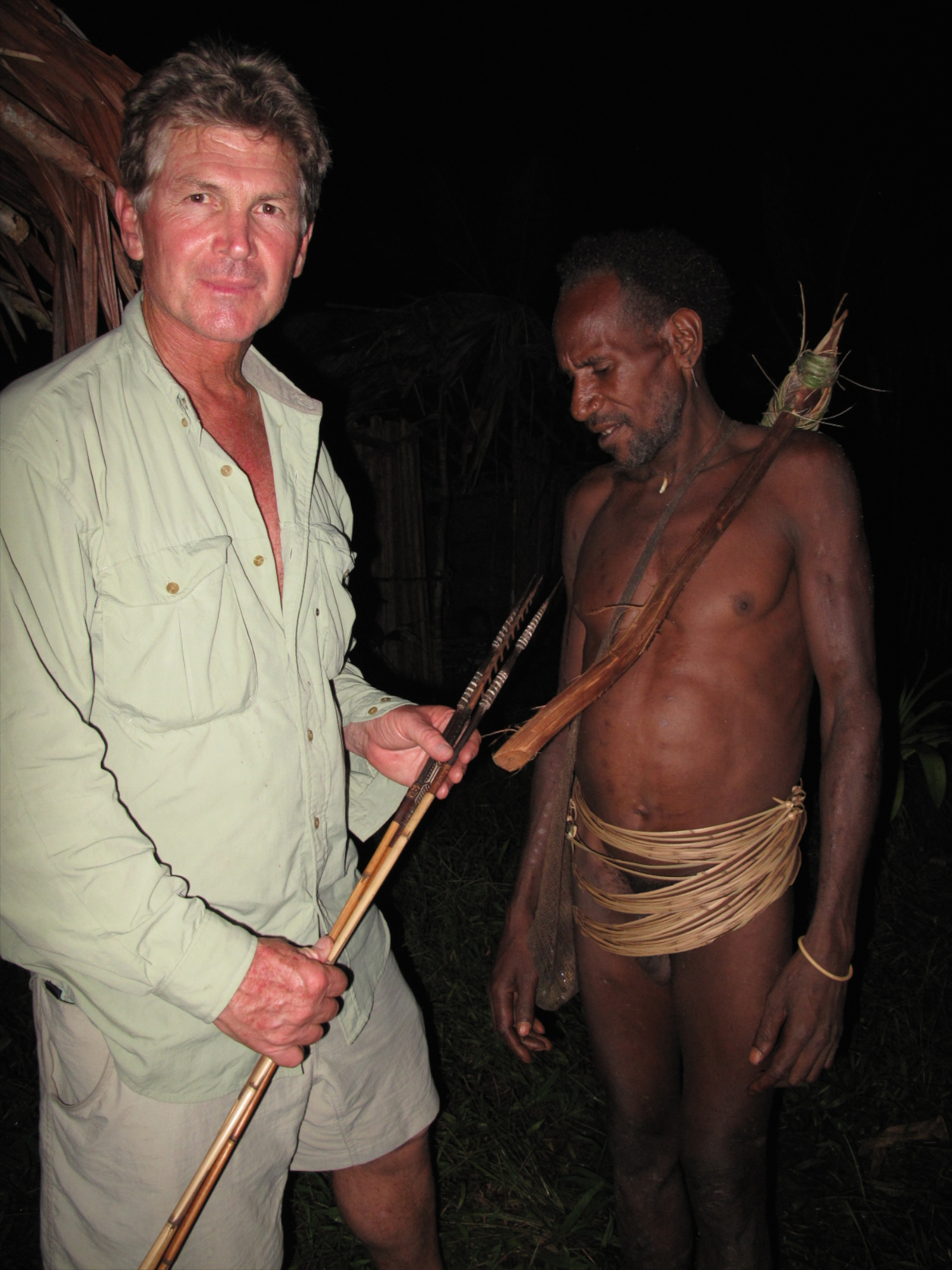
Barron, West Papua lowlands, New Guinea, 2014

Bruce Barron (born Long Beach, California) is a professional expedition guide, explorer, and photographer.

== Expeditions ==
Barron began guiding backpacking and mountaineering trips at the age of 15, and has since led explorations to the remote jungles, mountains, forests and deserts around the globe. He has explored uncharted areas in the Andes, Himalayas, Amazon Basin, and West Papua New Guinea.

Most notable is the Barron Pickard Heath River Expedition in 1996, which discovered the source of the Heath River in the Peru/Bolivia Amazon Basin. The Heath River delineates the border of Peru and Bolivia for 350 kilometers from the Amazon basin lowlands into the Amazon cloud forest. The expedition's objective was to follow South American explorer Colonel Percy Fawcett's 1910 Expedition route and then continue on to discover the unknown source of the Heath River and make the first river descent. Barron worked with the Royal Geographical Society in London researching Fawcett’s original maps and journals and in Peru with biologists, anthropologists and the Ese Ejja native tribe.

Following a lifelong interest with the lives of indigenous peoples and their connection with the natural world, Barron spent time or lived with the Huaorani, and Quijos-Quichua of Ecuador’s Amazon over many years and with the Dani, Lani, Sentani and Korowai tribes of West Papua, New Guinea, Gurung, Tamang, Newar and Sherpa of Nepal, Ngalop of Bhutan, Ladakhi and Tibetan of Northern India, Maasai of Tanzania and Kenya, Berber of Morocco, Quechua and Ese Ejja of Peru and Bolivia, Maya and Lacandon of Central America.

He established Barron Adventures, an expedition, adventure travel guiding and adventure leadership training company in 1985. He has guided ascents to many peaks, including Denali, Aconcagua, Matterhorn, Mont Blanc, Kilimanjaro etc.. Along with expedition guiding, Barron developed and implemented leadership and team training programs for organizations in the United States and internationally, including a leadership program in the early 1990s for the Russian Federation Education Committee with Dr. Evgeny Velikhov, chief science advisor for the Russian Federation, providing leadership training to leaders and educators throughout the country.

Barron’s adventure photography has been published in Esquire and Reader’s Digest. Barron's photo documentary book, HUAORANI: An Amazon Tribe in the 21st Century, about the Huaorani tribal people of Ecuador’s Amazon Basin was published in 2013. A 2012 documentary, Amazonia: A Perilous Journey, was produced about the Barron Pickard Heath River Expedition.

== Works ==
=== Books ===
- HUAORANI: An Amazon Tribe in the 21st Century Bruce Barron, 2013.

=== Film ===
- Amazonia: A Perilous Journey Mike DePrez / Karon Aghotte, 2012.
