= Andy Tommy =

Canadian football player (1911–1972)

Profile
- Positions: Halfback, Flying wing

Personal information
- Born: December 24, 1911; Hartland, New Brunswick, Canada
- Died: April 23, 1972 (aged 60); Wakefield, Quebec, Canada

Career history
- 1933–1941: Ottawa Rough Riders
- 1945: Toronto Argonauts
- 1946–1947: Ottawa Rough Riders

Awards and highlights
- Grey Cup champion (1940, 1945); Jeff Russel Memorial Trophy (1940); 2× CFL All-Star (1936, 1940); Canada's Sports Hall of Fame (1976)
- Canadian Football Hall of Fame (Class of 1989)

Andrew Bailey Tommy Sr. (December 24, 1911 – April 23, 1972) was a star professional Canadian football player for eleven seasons for the Ottawa Rough Riders and one season for the Toronto Argonauts. Tommy led his team to two Grey Cup wins, in 1940 and 1945. He was inducted into the Canadian Football Hall of Fame in 1989 and into the Canada's Sports Hall of Fame in 1976.

Andy Tommy was born on December 24, 1911, to Hum Yee Tommy and Mary Lavinge. Tommy's father immigrated to Canada from Kaiping, China, and settled in Woodstock, New Brunswick. The surname "Tommy" came as an anglicized version of Hum Yee's name.

He worked at the Dominion Bureau of Statistics.
