= 1930 Winnipeg Winnipegs season =

Canadian football team season

- President: Richard Mahoney
- Head coach: Jack Millidge
- Home stadium: Carruthers Park

Results
- Record: 0–4
- Division place: 2nd, MRFU

The 1930 Winnipeg Winnipegs was the inaugural season of the franchise. On June 10, 1930, under the direction of Richard Mahoney, the community-owned Winnipeg Football Club began operations as a community-owned team, following the reorganization of the Winnipeg Tammany Tigers, who had previously dissolved.

The team (unofficially known as the "Winnipegs") played their first game against St. John's Rugby Football Club on June 13, 1930 at Carruthers Park, losing 7–3.

== Regular season ==
=== Standings ===
Manitoba Rugby Football Union
Team	GP	W	L	T	PF	PA	Pts
Winnipeg St.John's	4	4	0	0	75	5	8
Winnipegs	4	0	4	0	5	75	0
