= Larry Haynes =

Canadian football player

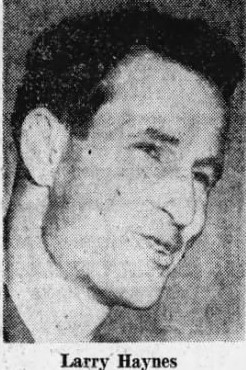

Profile
- Position: End

Personal information
- Born: December 30, 1911; Stavely, Alberta, Canada
- Died: March 1, 1994 (aged 82); Chadron, Nebraska, U.S.
- Listed height: 6 ft 0 in (1.83 m)
- Listed weight: 185 lb (84 kg)

Career information
- College: Washington State

Career history

Playing
- 1936–1940, 1946: Calgary Bronks
- 1941: Vancouver Grizzlies

Coaching
- 1940: Calgary Bronks
- 1940s: Vancouver

Laird H. "Larry" Haynes (December 30, 1911 – March 1, 1994) was a Canadian football end who played and coached the Calgary Bronks (now known as the Calgary Stampeders). He played from 1936 to 1940, and in 1946. Haynes was the head coach of the Bronks in 1940. He was named All-Western in 1936, 1937, and 1938 as well as All-Canada in 1939 and 1941 (he played with the Vancouver Grizzlies in 1941). In his one season as coach, he had a 4–4 record. He later coached the Vancouver Fighting Irish football and basketball teams before serving in World War II.

Haynes was the son of American-born Lester "Slim" Haynes, who was the pitcher of the Stavely, Alberta baseball team from 1919 to 1933. Larry Haynes later moved to United States where he farmed three miles southwest of Whitney, Nebraska. He died in Chadron, Nebraska in 1994 at the age of 82.
