= Joe Ryan (Canadian football) =

Canadian football manager

Personal information
- Born: April 11, 1902; Starbuck, Manitoba, Canada
- Died: June 2, 1979 (aged 77); Victoria, British Columbia, Canada

Career history
- 1931-41: Winnipeg Winnipegs (Manager)
- 1946-49: Montreal Alouettes (Manager)
- 1960-65: Edmonton Eskimos (GM)
- Canadian Football Hall of Fame (Class of 1968)

Joseph Bernard Ryan (11 April 1902 — 2 June 1979) was a Canadian football manager of the Winnipeg Winnipegs and Montreal Alouettes between the 1930s to 1940s. During his manager tenures, Ryan won the Grey Cup with Winnipeg in 1935, 1939 and 1941. He also won the Grey Cup with the Alouettes in 1949. With the Canadian Football League, Ryan worked as the general manager of the Edmonton Eskimos from 1960 to 1965. Ryan was inducted into the Canadian Football Hall of Fame in 1968, the Canada's Sports Hall of Fame in 1975 and the Manitoba Sports Hall of Fame in 1982.

== Early life and education ==
Ryan was born on 11 April 1902 in Starbuck, Manitoba. He attended a law program at the University of Manitoba before dropping out after the first year.

== Career ==
Ryan began his career at a lumber company in Chicago during the start of the 1920s. After moving to Winnipeg, he worked for Manitoba Pool Elevators from 1928 to 1930. Ryan shifted to rugby football in 1931 when he became manager of the Winnipeg Winnipegs. While with Winnipeg, the 'Pegs won the 1935 Grey Cup as manager. When the 'Pegs were renamed the Winnipeg Blue Bombers, Ryan won additional Grey Cups in 1939 and 1941.

Ryan went on to co-form the Montreal Hornets and the Montreal Alouettes in the mid 1940s. With the Alouettes, Ryan was a manager and a secretary until 1949. He also won the 1949 Grey Cup as the manager for the Alouettes. After a break from football, Ryan joined the Canadian Football League in 1960 to become the general manager of the Edmonton Eskimos. With the Eskimos, Ryan served as general manager from 1960 to 1965 and executive assistant in 1966. He ended his football career in 1967 and moved to Victoria, British Columbia. Outside of football, Ryan became a sportswriter for the Winnipeg Free Press in 1938 and worked at an Ottawa tax office in 1942.

== Awards and honours ==
Ryan was inducted into the Canadian Football Hall of Fame in 1968. In 1975, he was inducted into the Canada's Sports Hall of Fame. After his death, Ryan was posthumously named to the Manitoba Sports Hall of Fame in 1982. A few years later, he became a member of the Winnipeg Blue Bombers Hall of Fame in 1984.

== Death ==
On 2 June 1979, Ryan died from cancer in Victoria, British Columbia.

== Personal life ==
Ryan was married and had four children. One of his children Tim, is a sportscaster for NBC, CBS, Fox and the New York Islanders.
