= Vancouver Grizzlies (football) =

General information
- Founded: 1941; 85 years ago
- Folded: 1941; 85 years ago
- Stadium: Athletic Park
- Headquartered: Vancouver, British Columbia, Canada

League / conference affiliations
- Western Interprovincial Football Union

Championships
- League championships: 0; 0

The Vancouver Grizzlies were a Canadian football team that played a single season in 1941 in the Western Interprovincial Football Union, the forerunner of the Canadian Football League West Division. Journalist Jim Coleman was one of the team's co-founders. League play was suspended in 1942 due to the Second World War and the team did not return when WIFU resumed in 1946.

The Vancouver Grizzlies played in all-red uniforms and were created by Italo ‘Tiny’ Rader and journalist Jim Coleman as owners of the team. They played eight league games in 33 days and played four road games over a period of nine games. Their exhausting schedule played a strong role in their 1–7 season. Their only victory came on September 15 during a pouring rain against the Regina Roughriders. They won 7–6 on a touchdown by Jack Horne. They played their home games at old Athletic Park at West 5th Avenue and Hemlock Street in Vancouver.

== Record ==
Season	W	L	T	PF	PA	Pts	Finish	Playoffs
1941	1	7	0	15	109	2	Last place	-
