= 1953 Winnipeg Blue Bombers season =

Canadian football team season

- Home stadium: Winnipeg Stadium

Results
- Record: 8–8
- Division place: 3rd, WIPU
- Playoffs: Lost Grey Cup

The 1953 Winnipeg Blue Bombers was the 21st season of the franchise.

== Regular season ==
Western Interprovincial Football Union
Team	GP	W	L	T	PF	PA	Pts
Edmonton Eskimos	16	12	4	0	276	157	24
Saskatchewan Roughriders	16	8	7	1	243	239	17
Winnipeg Blue Bombers	16	8	8	0	226	226	16
Calgary Stampeders	16	3	12	1	190	313	7

== Playoffs ==
=== Semifinals ===
WIFU semifinals – game 1
Saskatchewan Roughriders @ Winnipeg Blue Bombers
Date	Away	Home
October 28	Saskatchewan Roughriders 5	Winnipeg Blue Bombers 43

WIFU semifinals – game 2
Winnipeg Blue Bombers @ Saskatchewan Roughriders
Date	Away	Home
October 31	Winnipeg Blue Bombers 17	Saskatchewan Roughriders 18

- Winnipeg won the total-point series by 60–23. The Blue Bombers will play the Edmonton Eskimos in the WIFU Finals.

=== Finals ===
WIFU Finals – Game 1
Winnipeg Blue Bombers @ Edmonton Eskimos
Date	Away	Home
November 7	Winnipeg Blue Bombers 7	Edmonton Eskimos 25

WIFU Finals – Game 2
Edmonton Eskimos @ Winnipeg Blue Bombers
Date	Away	Home
November 11	Edmonton Eskimos 17	Winnipeg Blue Bombers 21

WIFU Finals – Game 3
Winnipeg Blue Bombers @ Edmonton Eskimos
Date	Away	Home
November 14	Winnipeg Blue Bombers 30	Edmonton Eskimos 24

- Winnipeg wins the best of three series 2–1.

=== Grey Cup ===
Team	Q1	Q2	Q3	Q4	Total
Winnipeg Blue Bombers	0	0	6	0	6
Hamilton Tiger-Cats	6	0	6	0	12
