= Red Threlfall =

American sports coach (1903–1971)

Biographical details
- Born: June 2, 1903; Newton Highlands, Massachusetts, U.S.
- Died: February 14, 1971 (aged 67); Sun City, Arizona, U.S.

Playing career

Football
- 1924–1926: Purdue
- Position: Center

Coaching career (HC unless noted)

Football
- 1927–1928: Bates (assistant)
- 1934–1937: South Dakota State
- 1938–1944: Winnipeg Blue Bombers

Basketball
- 1930–1933: South Dakota State
- 1936–1937: South Dakota State

Administrative career (AD unless noted)
- 1934–1937: South Dakota State

Head coaching record
- Overall: 17–19–2 (college football); 25–32 (college basketball)

Reginald H. "Red" Threlfall (June 2, 1903 – February 14, 1971) was an American football, basketball and Canadian football coach. He served as the head football coach at South Dakota State University in Brookings, South Dakota, from 1934 to 1937, compiling a record of 17–19–2. Threlfall was the head coach of the Winnipeg Blue Bombers of the Canadian Football League (CFL) from 1938 to 1944.

== Athletic career ==
Threlfall played tackle for four years at Waltham High School in Waltham, Massachusetts. He enrolled at Purdue University in 1922, but financial difficulties forced him to leave. He returned to Purdue in 1923 and played on the freshman football team. He played tackle and center for the varsity team from 1924 to 1926. He was also a member of the school's wrestling team.

== Coaching career ==
During his senior year with the Boilermakers, Threlfall assisted coaching the team's linemen during spring practice. In 1927 he was hired as an assistant football coach at Bates College. He and head coach Carleton Wiggin left after the 1928 season. In 1930 he joined the athletic department at South Dakota State. From 1934 to 1937 he was the school's head football coach and athletic director. From 1938 to 1942 he coached the Winnipeg Blue Bombers to 28-8 regular season and five Grey Cup appearances, winning in 1939 and 1941. His .778 winning percentage is the highest in team history.

== Insurance ==
In 1940, Threlfall joined the Winnipeg branch of Sun Life. He then worked for the Great West Life Assurance Company. In 1953 he was appointed vice president and superintendent of agencies for Western States Life Insurance Company.

== Later life and death ==
In 1968, Threlfall retired and moved to Sun City, Arizona. He suffered a heart attack on February 3, 1971, and had a stroke six days later. He died on February 14, 1971.

== Head coaching record ==
=== College football ===
Year	Team	Overall	Conference	Standing	Bowl/playoffs
South Dakota State Jackrabbits (North Central Conference) (1934–1937)
1934	South Dakota State	6–4	2–2	4th	
1935	South Dakota State	4–4–1	1–3–1	5th	
1936	South Dakota State	3–6–1	1–4–1	7th	
1937	South Dakota State	4–5	2–3	6th	
South Dakota State:		17–19–2	6–12–2		
Total:		17–19–2			
