= 41st Grey Cup =

1953 Canadian Football championship game

Hamilton Tiger-Cats	Winnipeg Blue Bombers
(8–6)	(8–8)
12	6
Head coach: Carl M. Voyles	Head coach: George Trafton
	1	2	3	4	Total
Hamilton Tiger-Cats	6	0	6	0	12
Winnipeg Blue Bombers	0	0	6	0	6
- Date: 28 November 1953
- Stadium: Varsity Stadium
- Location: Toronto
- Referee: Paul Dojack
- Attendance: 27,313

Broadcasters
- Network: CBC - live on three stations

The 41st Grey Cup game was the Canadian football Championship in 1953. Hamilton Tiger-Cats defeated Winnipeg Blue Bombers 12–6 at Toronto's Varsity Stadium in a game which ended on a controversial pass incompletion.

== Pre-game background ==
Winnipeg coach George Trafton prepared for the championship game amid rumours that he would return to coaching in the National Football League. Trafton was coaching for the Los Angeles Rams until he left for Winnipeg in 1951.

The Grey Cup Parade on the morning of the game day featured 12 Miss Grey Cup contestants, 15 bands, 40 floats and 150,000 spectators.

== Game summary ==
The ceremonial game kickoff was made by Lester B. Pearson who was national minister of External Affairs at that time, assisted by Miss Grey Cup, Joanne Baird of Regina, Saskatchewan.

Hamilton had the only score of the first half, a short touchdown run by Ed Songin at 10:28, converted by Tip Logan, to cap a 53-yard drive in the first quarter. In the second quarter the Bombers' quarterback "Indian" Jack Jacobs engineered a 6 play, 92 yard drive which was snuffed out deep in Hamilton's end when Vito Ragazzo intercepted.

One fan death was reported before half time, that of Timmins resident Roderick Osborne who collapsed in the stadium seating area.

In the third quarter another Bomber drive faltered at the Hamilton 28 when Dick Brown intercepted a Jack Jacobs pass. Again the Bombers drove within scoring range but a field goal attempt by Bud Korchak produced no points. Finally the Bombers were able to capitalize on a 50-yard drive with a Gerry James run from the one yard line who touched down at 10:56, converted by Korchak. But the Ticats roared back. On the first play after the kickoff Lou Kusserow passed to Ralph Toohy for 21 yards. The Ticats lost a yard on the first down play, but on second down Songin made a short pass to Ragazzo. Bomber defender Geoff Crain went for the interception but missed, and Ragazzo had an open field for a 45-yard pass and run touchdown at 12:16, with Logan again providing the conversion point.

With the score 12-6 and time running out in the fourth quarter, Jacobs put together yet another long drive of 98 yards to the Hamilton two-yard line. On the final play of the game he passed to an apparently wide-open Tom Casey, standing on the goal line. But as the ball reached his hands Hamiton's Kusserow hit Casey and he dropped the ball. Winnipeg fans claimed pass interference and Hamilton fans called it a very well timed tackle. Even examination of the game films has not succeeded in resolving the dispute. However, the officials called no penalty and Hamilton won the game.
