= Carl Cronin =

American football player (1908–1983)

Profile
- Position: Quarterback

Personal information
- Born: 1908; Chicago, Illinois, U.S.
- Died: September 13, 1983 (aged 74); Vancouver, British Columbia, Canada

Career information
- College: University of Notre Dame

Career history
- 1932–1933: Winnipeg Pegs

Awards and highlights
- 2× National champion (1929, 1930)
- Canadian Football Hall of Fame (Class of 1967)

Carl Michael Cronin (1908 – September 13, 1983) was a quarterback who played two seasons in the Canadian Football League (CFL) for the Winnipeg Pegs. He then was a head coach for the Calgary Bronks for five seasons. In 1967, he was inducted into the Canadian Football Hall of Fame. He died in Vancouver in 1983.
