= 23rd Grey Cup =

1935 Canadian Football championship game

Winnipeg 'Pegs	Hamilton Tigers
(3–0)	(7–2)
18	12
Head coach: Bob Fritz	Head coach: Fred Veale
	1	2	3	4	Total
Winnipeg 'Pegs	5	7	6	0	18
Hamilton Tigers	3	1	6	2	12
- Date: December 7, 1935
- Stadium: Hamilton Amateur Athletic Association Grounds
- Location: Hamilton
- Attendance: 6,405

The 23rd Grey Cup was played on December 7, 1935, at Hamilton Amateur Athletic Association Grounds, with 6,405 fans in attendance. It marked the first time that a team from west of Ontario won the Grey Cup.

The Winnipeg 'Pegs defeated the Hamilton Tigers 18–12.

== Game summary ==
Winnipeg scored on the first play from scrimmage in the game. Hamilton kick returner Jack Craig failed to catch the Winnipeg kickoff and Winnipeg recovered. On the next play Bob Fritz completed a 15-yard touchdown pass to Bud Marquardt but the convert failed. Hamilton was able to respond with a field goal.

In the second quarter Winnipeg's Russ Rebholz completed a touchdown pass to Greg Kabat and this time the convert was good. Each team scored a single to make the halftime score 12-4.

In the third quarter Hamilton's Eddie Wright recovered a blocked kick and returned it to the Winnipeg 15 yard line. Wilf Patterson capped a four play drive to run in for the touchdown. The convert and a Frank Turville single brought Hamilton to within two points. With the score 12-10, ace Winnipeg punt returner Fritz Hanson who had 334 yards in punt returns on the day received a punt near his 30-yard line and returned it 78 yards for the touchdown.

Hamilton however forced Winnipeg to give up a safety leaving them a converted touchdown behind. The Tigers marched to the Winnipeg four. A running play went nowhere, so Hamilton tried an onside kick into the end zone. This failed but the Tigers retained possession and on the last play of the game again attempted the onside kick. This time Hanson recovered and ran the ball out of the end zone denying Hamilton even the rouge.

== Notable facts ==
This was the first Grey Cup game to feature a number of imported players. The Winnipegs had seven imports in the lineup including future Canadian Football Hall of Famers Hanson, Kabat and Rebholz.
