= Calgary Bronks =

Professional Canadian football team

General information
- Founded: 1935
- Folded: 1940
- Headquartered: Calgary, Alberta

League / conference affiliations
- Alberta Rugby Football Union (1935–1936); Western Canada Rugby Football Union; Western Interprovincial Football Union

Championships
- League championships: 0; 2 league championships

The Calgary Bronks were a professional Canadian football team based in Calgary, Alberta, that competed in the Alberta Rugby Football Union (ARFU) in 1935 and 1936, as well as the Western Interprovincial Football Union (WIFU) from 1936 and 1940, folding in that year.

== Notable players ==
Bronks player include Bob Cosgrove, John McKee, Paul Rowe and Bill Wusyk. Carl Cronin was head coach of the team from 1935 to 1938.

== Calgary Bronks seasons ==
List of Calgary Bronks (football) seasons
