= 27th Grey Cup =

1939 Canadian Football championship game

Winnipeg Blue Bombers	Ottawa Rough Riders
(10–2)	(5–1)
8	7
Head coach: Reg Threlfall	Head coach: Ross Trimble
	1	2	3	4	Total
Winnipeg Blue Bombers	5	1	0	2	8
Ottawa Rough Riders	6	0	0	1	7
- Date: December 9, 1939
- Stadium: Lansdowne Park
- Location: Ottawa
- Attendance: 11,738

The 27th Grey Cup was played on December 9, 1939, before 11,738 fans at Lansdowne Park at Ottawa.

The Winnipeg Blue Bombers defeated the Ottawa Rough Riders 8–7. The weekend of the match saw very low temperatures so the night before the game the groundskeepers attempted to warm the playing surface by lighting hundreds of litres of gasoline, nevertheless, the field was frozen again the next day.
