= 29th Grey Cup =

1941 Canadian Football championship game

Winnipeg Blue Bombers	Ottawa Rough Riders
(6–2)	(5–1)
18	16
Head coach: Reg Threlfall	Head coach: Ross Trimble
	1	2	3	4	Total
Winnipeg Blue Bombers	3	6	9	0	18
Ottawa Rough Riders	6	3	6	1	16
- Date: November 29, 1941
- Stadium: Varsity Stadium
- Location: Toronto
- Attendance: 19,065

The 29th Grey Cup was played on November 29, 1941, before 19,065 fans at Varsity Stadium at Toronto.

The Winnipeg Blue Bombers defeated the Ottawa Rough Riders 18–16.

== Trivia ==
- This was the last Grey Cup game for the civilian based teams before World War II the games were played by Provisional Military teams until 1945
