= Belichick (surname) =

Belichick is a surname, which is the Americanized form of the Croatian last name Biličić. Notable people with the name include:

- Bill Belichick (born 1952), American football coach
- Brian Belichick, American football coach, son of Bill
- Stephen Belichick (born 1987), American football coach, son of Bill
- Steve Belichick (1919–2005), American football player and coach, father of Bill
