= List of NFL head coaches by playoff record =

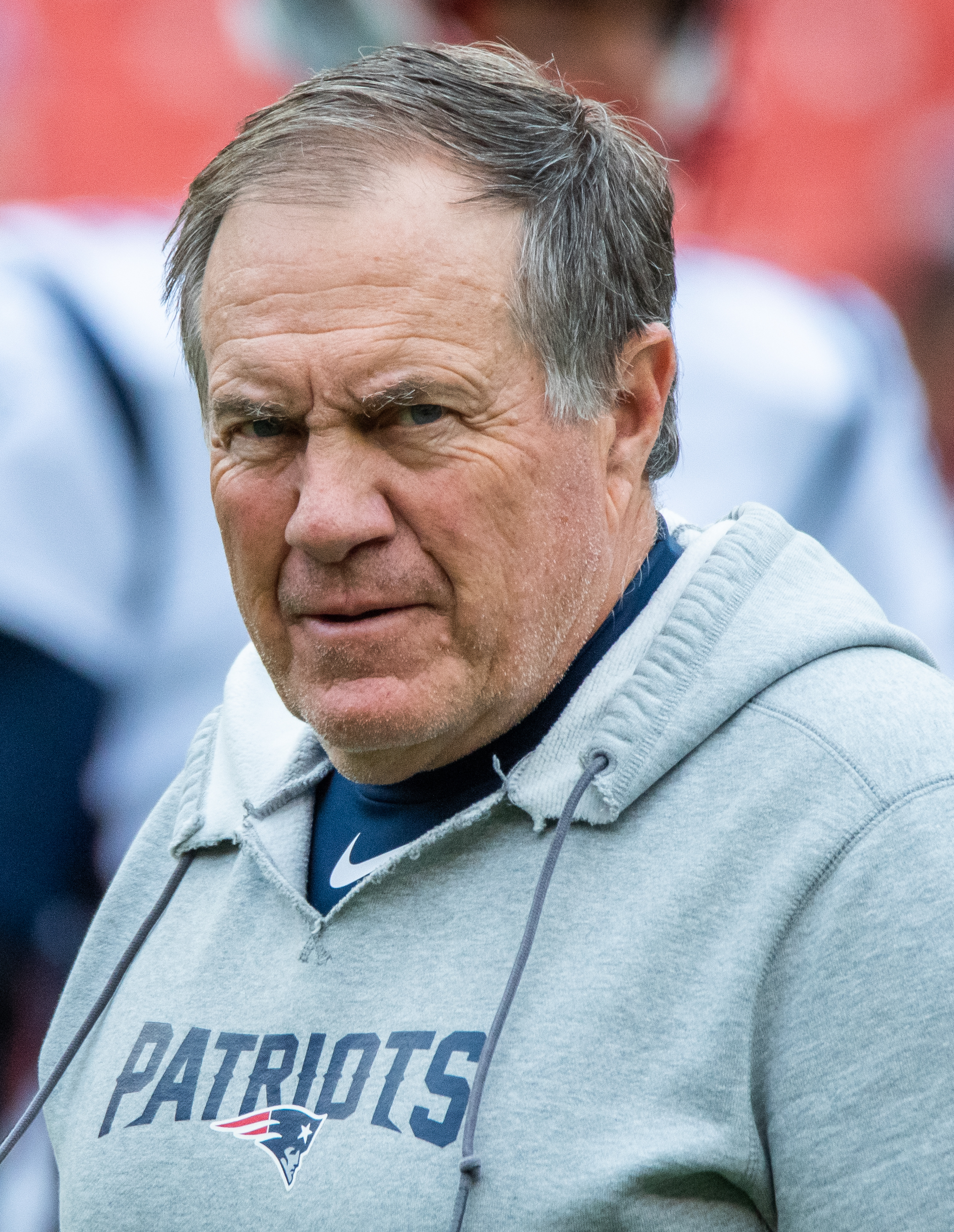
Bill Belichick is the all-time leader in playoff wins with 31. He gained the top spot with New England's win over the Indianapolis Colts in the 2014 AFC Championship Game.

The following table is a list of head coaches in the National Football League (NFL) listed by career playoff record and wins.

== Champion coaches ==
Since playoffs began in the 1933 NFL season, the following 60 coaches have led their team to an NFL, AFL, or AAFC title. On April 1, 2025 the NFL announced All-America Football Conference records and statistics will be recognized in its official records. Super Bowls before the 1970 AFL–NFL merger are not included in total championship count.

† is a member of the Pro Football Hall of Fame

**Bold** denotes an active coach	^ Won with 2 teams	♦1921 champion coach before playoff games began	♠1929, 1930, 1931 champion coach before playoff games began

Playoff Champion Coaches listed by number of wins, then year
Rank	Coach	Team	NFL Season		Total Playoff Championships
Rank	Coach	Team	NFL Champs	Super Bowls	Total Playoff Championships
1	Paul Brown†	Browns	AAFC 1946, 1947, 1948, 1949; NFL 1950, 1954, 1955		7
2	Bill Belichick	Patriots		2001, 2003, 2004, 2014, 2016, 2018	6
3	George Halas†♦	Bears	1933, 1940, 1941, 1946, 1963		5
3	Vince Lombardi†	Packers	1961, 1962, 1965, 1966, 1967	1966, 1967 (pre merger)	5
5	Chuck Noll†	Steelers		1974, 1975, 1978, 1979	4
6	Curly Lambeau†♠	Packers	1936, 1939, 1944		3
6	Weeb Ewbank† ^	Colts	1958, 1959		3
6	Weeb Ewbank† ^	Jets	AFL 1968	1968 (pre merger)	3
6	Hank Stram†	Dallas Texans / Chiefs	AFL 1962, 1966, 1969	1969 (pre merger)	3
6	Don Shula† ^	Colts	1968		3
6	Don Shula† ^	Dolphins		1972, 1973	3
6	Bill Walsh†	49ers		1981, 1984, 1988	3
6	Joe Gibbs†	Redskins		1982, 1987, 1991	3
6	**Andy Reid**	Chiefs		2019, 2022, 2023	3
13	Steve Owen†	Giants	1934, 1938		2
13	Ray Flaherty†	Redskins	1937, 1942		2
13	Greasy Neale†	Eagles	1948, 1949		2
13	Buddy Parker	Lions	1952, 1953		2
13	Lou Saban	Bills	AFL 1964, 1965		2
13	Tom Landry†	Cowboys		1971, 1977	2
13	Tom Flores†	Raiders		1980, 1983	2
13	Bill Parcells†	Giants		1986, 1990	2
13	George Seifert	49ers		1989, 1994	2
13	Jimmy Johnson†	Cowboys		1992, 1993	2
13	Mike Shanahan	Broncos		1997, 1998	2
13	Tom Coughlin	Giants		2007, 2011	2
25	Potsy Clark	Lions	1935		1
25	Hunk Anderson and co-coach Luke Johnsos	Bears	1943		1
25	Adam Walsh	Rams	1945		1
25	Jimmy Conzelman†	Cardinals	1947		1
25	Joe Stydahar†	Rams	1951		1
25	Jim Lee Howell	Giants	1956		1
25	George Wilson	Lions	1957		1
25	Buck Shaw	Eagles	1960		1
25	Lou Rymkus	Oilers	AFL 1960		1
25	Wally Lemm	Oilers	AFL 1961		1
25	Sid Gillman†	Chargers	AFL 1963		1
25	Blanton Collier	Browns	1964		1
25	John Rauch	Raiders	AFL 1967		1
25	Bud Grant†	Vikings	1969		1
25	Don McCafferty	Colts		1970	1
25	John Madden†	Raiders		1976	1
25	Mike Ditka†	Bears		1985	1
25	Barry Switzer	Cowboys		1995	1
25	Mike Holmgren	Packers		1996	1
25	Dick Vermeil†	Rams		1999	1
25	Brian Billick	Ravens		2000	1
25	Jon Gruden	Buccaneers		2002	1
25	Bill Cowher†	Steelers		2005	1
25	Tony Dungy†	Colts		2006	1
25	Mike Tomlin	Steelers		2008	1
25	**Sean Payton**	Saints		2009	1
25	**Mike McCarthy**	Packers		2010	1
25	**John Harbaugh**	Ravens		2012	1
25	Pete Carroll	Seahawks		2013	1
25	Gary Kubiak	Broncos		2015	1
25	Doug Pederson	Eagles		2017	1
25	Bruce Arians	Buccaneers		2020	1
25	**Sean McVay**	Rams		2021	1
25	**Nick Sirianni**	Eagles		2024	1
25	**Mike Macdonald**	Seahawks		2025	1

== Winning coaches ==
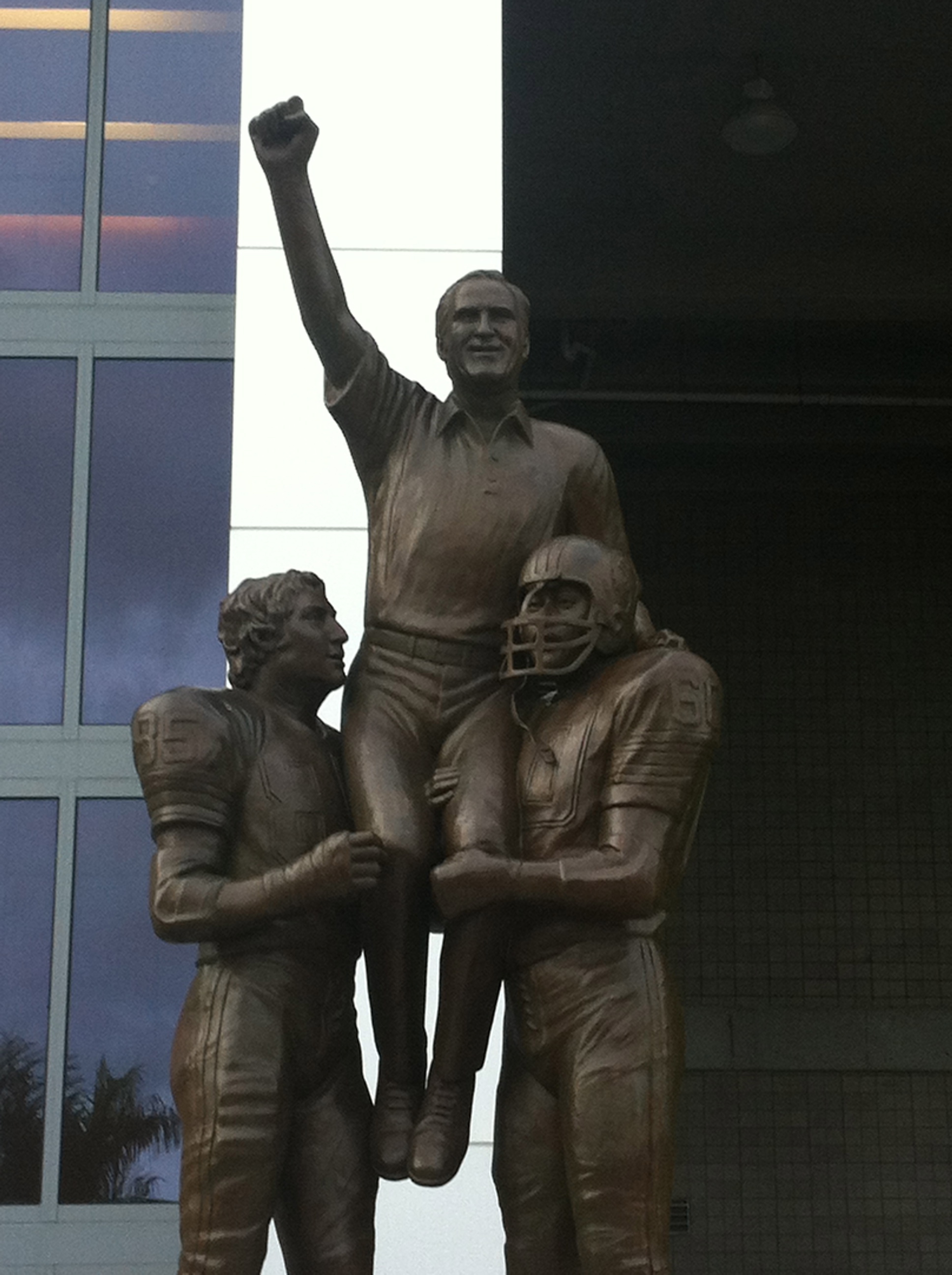
Don Shula won 3 playoff games in his 1972 perfect season.

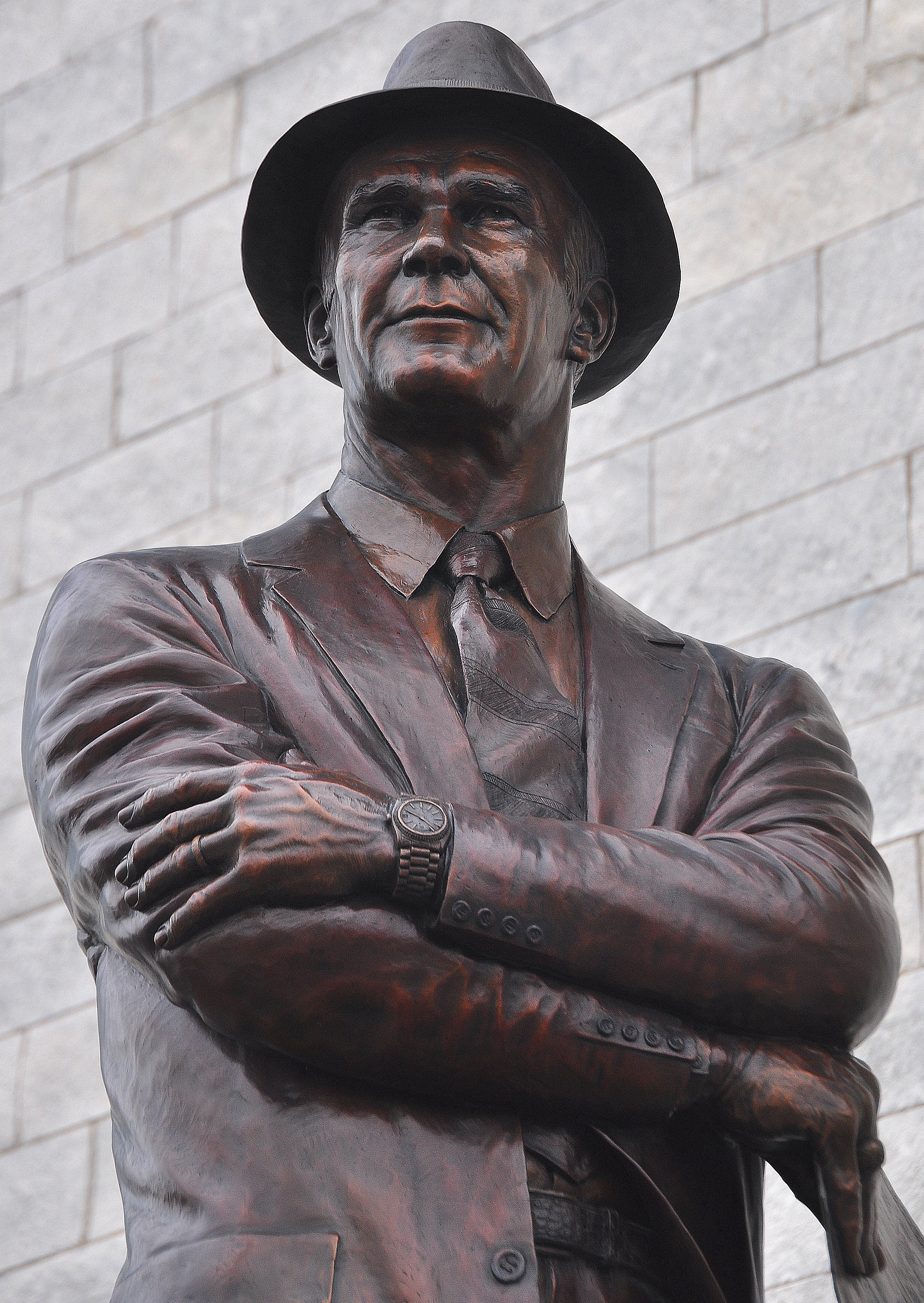
Tom Landry won 20 playoff games with the Cowboys.

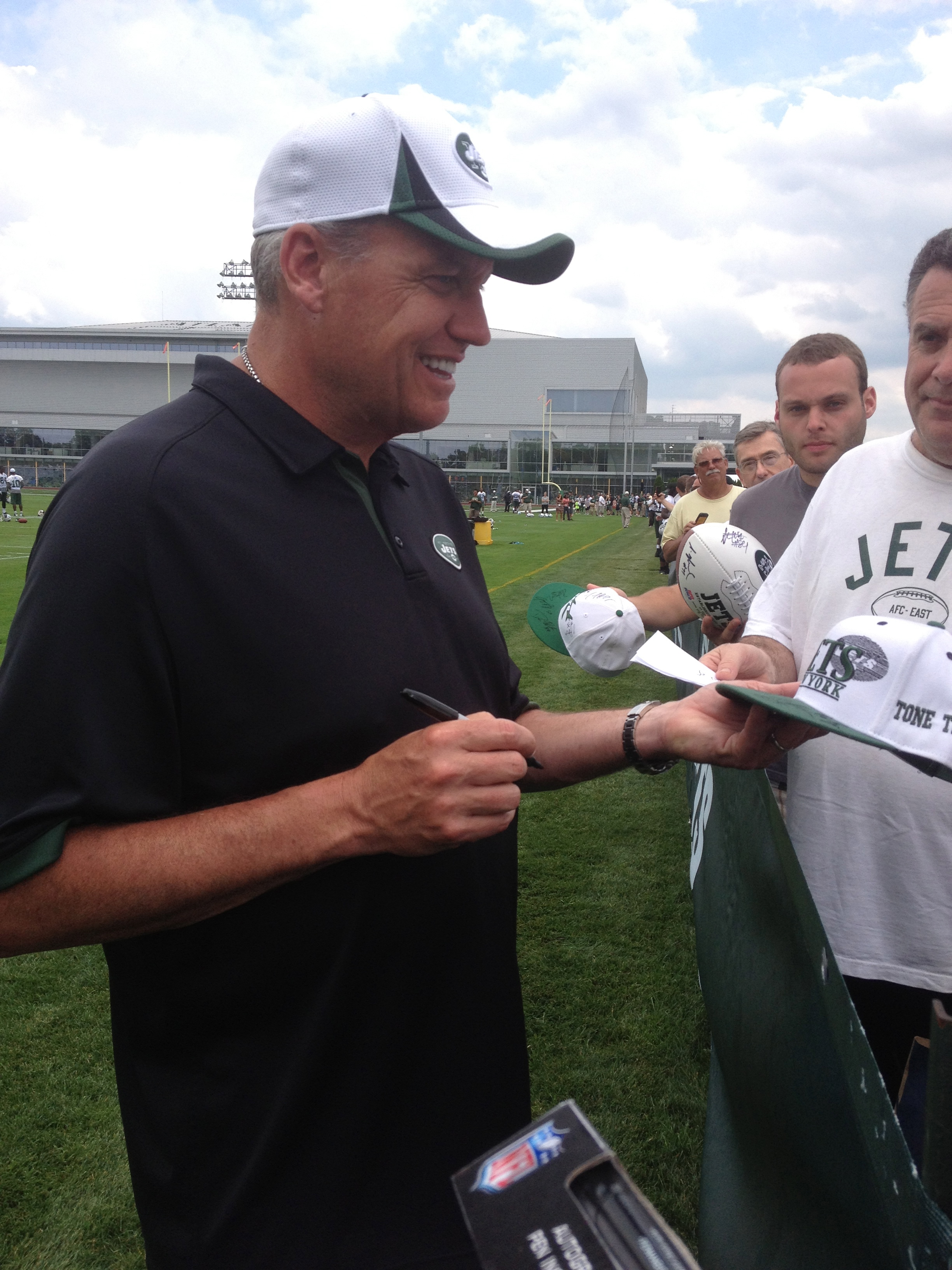
Rex Ryan coached the Jets to 2 AFC Championship games.

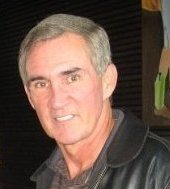
Mike Shanahan coached the Broncos to consecutive Super Bowl wins in 1997 and 1998.

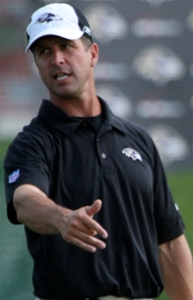
John Harbaugh coached the Ravens to the playoffs in his first five seasons, with a Super Bowl win in the 2012 season.

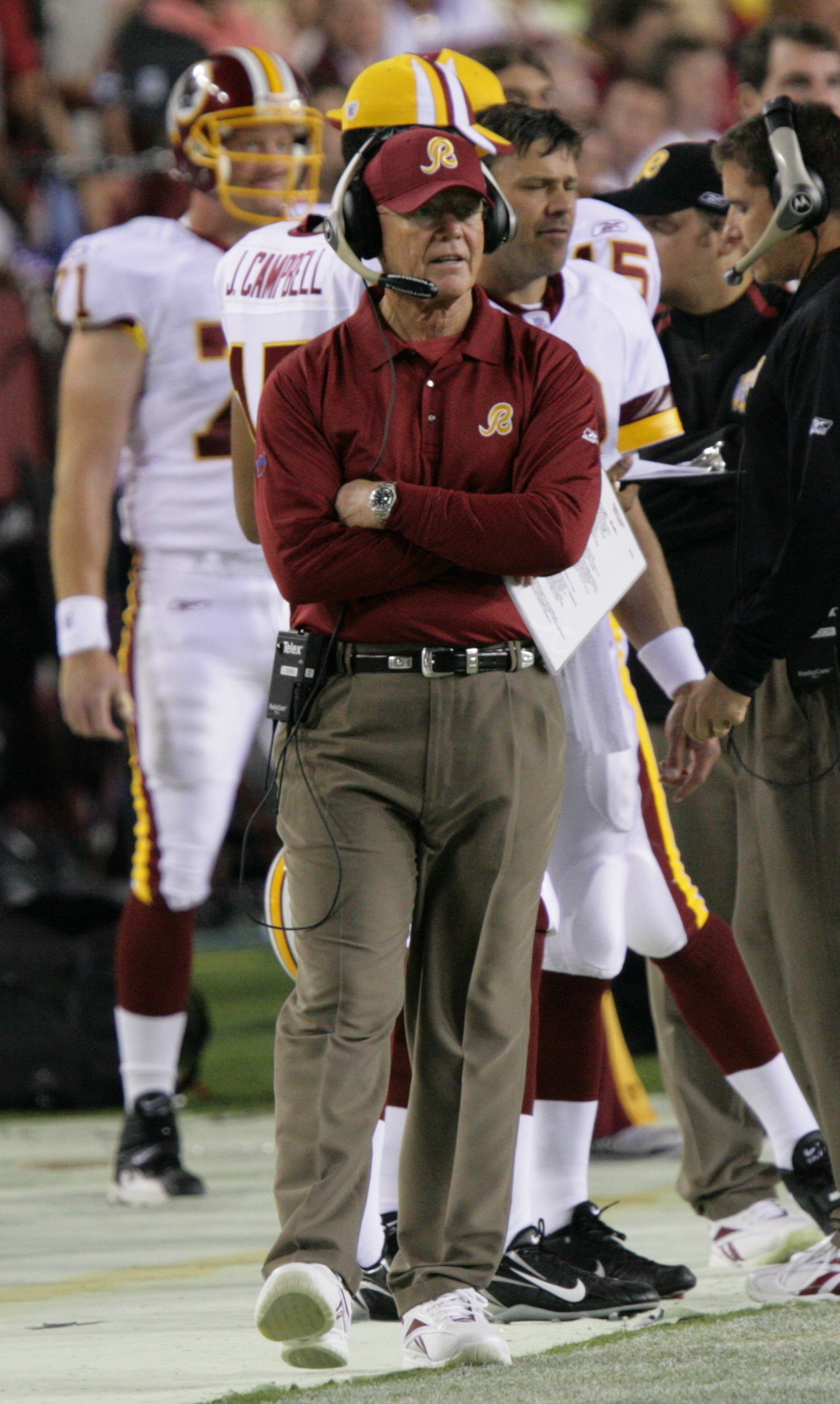
Hall of Famer Joe Gibbs led the Redskins to 3 championships.

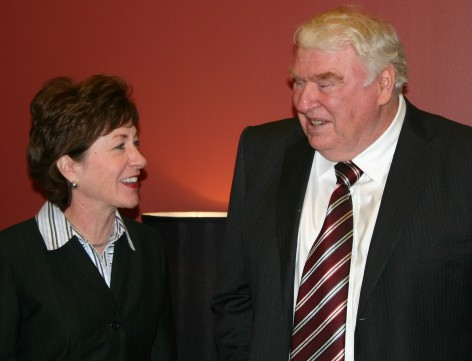
John Madden coached the Raiders to their first Super Bowl win.

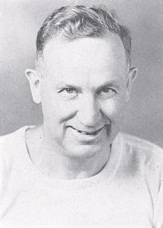
Potsy Clark coached the Lions to their first NFL crown in the 1935 season

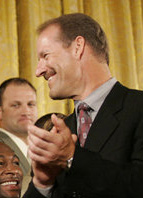
Bill Cowher was the second coach to lead the Steelers to a Super Bowl win.

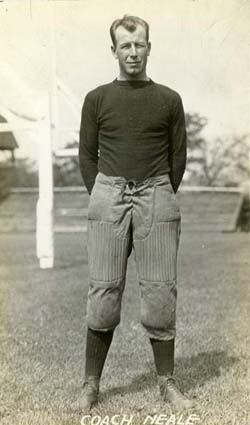
Greasy Neale coached the Eagles to their first two titles in 1948 and 1949.

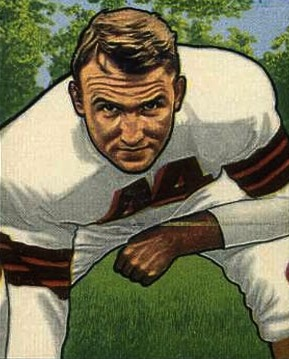
Lou Rymkus coached the first AFL champions, the 1960 Houston Oilers

Bill Belichick holds the current NFL record for most playoff wins by a head coach (31). The record for most games coached is held by Andy Reid (45). Vince Lombardi won 90% of his playoff appearances, the record for coaches with more than three games to their credit.

While many coaches have won playoff games for 2 teams, only two have won a championship for different franchises. Weeb Ewbank won the 1958 and 1959 NFL titles with the Baltimore Colts, then won the 1968 AFL crown and Super Bowl with the New York Jets. The other coach to win a championship with two teams was Don Shula. Shula was an NFL champion in 1968 with the Baltimore Colts, but lost in Super Bowl III to the AFL champs coached by Weeb Ewbank. Coach Shula then led the Miami Dolphins to titles in 1972 and 1973. So far, Shula has coached the only no-loss, no-tie perfect season in NFL history (1972).

This table lists every coach who has won a playoff game in the NFL or AFL.
If a coach has led multiple teams to the playoffs, the teams are listed in the order of his playoff appearances.

Sort chart by clicking on heading. Reload page to return to original form.
Sorting 'Teams' in ascending order will list all champion coaches for each team first and in the order they won the title game for their team.

**Bold** denotes an active coach
**Won a Super Bowl^{^}** or Championship
**Won 2 or more Super Bowls** ** or Championships

From 1960 to 1969, NFL and AFL Champs are listed.
From 1946 to 1949, NFL and AAFC Champs are listed
Super Bowls listed after the 1970 AFL–NFL merger.

†Coach is in the Hall of Fame as a player or a coach

Updated through the 2025-26 playoffs.

Coaches Sorted by 1st – Most Wins 2nd – Fewest Losses
Rank	Coach	Wins	Losses	Percent	Team(s) Listed in order coached	Championship Season(s)	Ref
1	Bill Belichick	31	13	.705	Browns (1–1) Patriots** (30–12)	2001, 2003, 2004, 2014, 2016, 2018	
2	**Andy Reid**	28	17	.622	Eagles (10–9) Chiefs ** (18–8)	2019, 2022, 2023	
3	Tom Landry†	20	16	.556	Cowboys**	1971, 1977	
4	Don Shula†	19	17	.528	Colts** (2–3)	1968	
4	Don Shula†	19	17	.528	Dolphins** (17–14)	1972, 1973	
5	Joe Gibbs†	17	7	.708	Redskins**	1982, 1987, 1991	
6	Chuck Noll†	16	8	.667	Steelers**	1974, 1975, 1978, 1979	
7	**John Harbaugh**	13	11	.542	Ravens ^	2012	
7	Mike Holmgren	13	11	.542	Packers ^ (9–5) Seahawks (4–6)	1996	
9	Tom Coughlin	12	7	.632	Jaguars (4–4) Giants** (8–3)	2007, 2011	
10	Bill Cowher†	12	9	.571	Steelers ^	2005	
11	Bill Parcells†	11	8	.579	Giants** (8–3) Patriots (2–2); Jets (1–1); Cowboys (0–2)	1986, 1990	
11	Marv Levy†	11	8	.579	Bills		
13	Dan Reeves	11	9	.550	Broncos (7–6); Giants (1–1); Falcons (3–2)		
14	Mike McCarthy	11	11	.500	Packers ^ (10–8) Cowboys (1–3)	2010	
14	Pete Carroll	11	11	.500	Patriots (1–2) Seahawks ^ (10–9)	2013	
16	Bill Walsh†	10	4	.714	49ers**	1981, 1984, 1988	
17	George Seifert	10	5	.667	49ers **	1989, 1994	
18	**Sean McVay**	10	6	.625	Rams ^	2021	
19	**Sean Payton**	10	10	.500	Saints ^ (9–8) Broncos (1–2)	2009	
20	Bud Grant†	10	12	.455	Vikings *	1969	
21	Vince Lombardi†	9	1	.900	Packers **	1961, 1962, 1965, 1966, 1967	
22	Jimmy Johnson†	9	4	.692	Cowboys** (7–1) Dolphins (2–3)	1992, 1993	
23	**Kyle Shanahan**	9	5	.643	49ers		
24	John Madden†	9	7	.563	Raiders ^	1976	
25	Paul Brown†	9	8	.529	Browns ** (9–5) Bengals (0–3)	AAFC 1946,1947,1948,1949; NFL 1950, 1954, 1955	
26	Tony Dungy†	9	10	.474	Buccaneers(2–4) Colts ^ (7–6)	2006	
27	Tom Flores†	8	3	.727	Raiders**	1980, 1983	
28	Mike Shanahan	8	6	.571	Broncos** (8–5) Redskins (0–1)	1997, 1998	
29	John Fox	8	7	.533	Panthers (5–3); Broncos (3–4)		
30	Sean McDermott	8	8	.500	Bills		
31	Mike Tomlin	8	12	.400	Steelers ^	2008	
32	Chuck Knox	7	11	.389	Rams (3–5); Bills (1–2); Seahawks (3–4)		
33	George Halas†	6	3	.667	Bears **	1933, 1940, 1941, 1946, 1963	
33	Bruce Arians	6	3	.667	Cardinals (1–2) Buccaneers ^ (5–1)	2020	
35	**Nick Sirianni**	6	4	.600	Eagles ^	2024	
36	Dick Vermeil†	6	5	.545	Eagles (3–4); Chiefs (0–1) Rams ^ (3–0)	1999	
37	Mike Ditka†	6	6	.500	Bears ^	1985	
38	Barry Switzer	5	2	.714	Cowboys ^	1995	
38	Gary Kubiak	5	2	.714	Texans (2–2) Broncos ^ (3–0)	2015	
38	**Zac Taylor**	5	2	.714	Bengals		
41	Hank Stram†	5	3	.625	Dallas Texans / Chiefs **	AFL 1962, 1966, 1969	
41	Brian Billick	5	3	.625	Ravens ^	2000	
41	Doug Pederson	5	3	.625	Eagles ^ (4–2) Jaguars (1–1)	2017	
41	**Dan Quinn**	5	3	.625	Falcons (3–2); Commanders (2–1)		
45	**Mike Vrabel**	5	4	.556	Titans (2–3); Patriots (3-1)		
46	Jon Gruden	5	5	.500	Raiders (2–3) Buccaneers ^ (3–2)	2002	
46	**Jim Harbaugh**	5	5	.500	49ers (5–3); Chargers (0–2)		
48	Jeff Fisher	5	6	.455	Oilers / Titans		
49	Marty Schottenheimer	5	13	.278	Browns (2–4); Chiefs (3–7); Chargers (0–2)		
50	Weeb Ewbank†	4	1	.800	Colts ** (2–0)	1958, 1959	
50	Weeb Ewbank†	4	1	.800	Jets ** (2–1)	AFL 1968	
50	Don McCafferty	4	1	.800	Colts ^	1970	
52	Ken Whisenhunt	4	2	.667	Cardinals		
52	Rex Ryan	4	2	.667	Jets		
54	Bum Phillips	4	3	.571	Oilers		
55	Norv Turner	4	4	.500	Redskins (1–1); Chargers (3–3)		
56	John Robinson	4	6	.400	Rams		
57	Dennis Green	4	8	.333	Vikings		
58	**Mike Macdonald**	3	0	1.000	Seahawks ^	2025	
59	Greasy Neale†	3	1	.750	Eagles **	1948, 1949	
59	Buddy Parker	3	1	.750	Lions **	1952, 1953	
61	Curly Lambeau†	3	2	.600	Packers **	1936, 1939, 1944	
61	Raymond Berry†	3	2	.600	Patriots		
61	Sam Wyche	3	2	.600	Bengals		
64	Lovie Smith	3	3	.500	Bears		
64	Jerry Burns	3	3	.500	Vikings		
64	Ray Malavasi	3	3	.500	Rams		
64	Chuck Pagano	3	3	.500	Colts		
64	**DeMeco Ryans**	3	3	.500	Texans		
69	Blanton Collier	3	4	.429	Browns ^	1964	
69	Jerry Glanville	3	4	.429	Oilers (2–3); Falcons (1–1)		
69	Steve Mariucci	3	4	.429	49ers		
69	Mike Martz	3	4	.429	Rams		
73	Bobby Ross	3	5	.375	Chargers (3–3); Lions (0–2)		
73	Ron Rivera	3	5	.375	Panthers (3–4); Commanders (0–1)		
75	Don Coryell†	3	6	.333	Cardinals (0–2); Chargers (3–4)		
75	**Matt LaFleur**	3	6	.333	Packers		
77	George Wilson	2	0	1.000	Lions ^	1957	
78	Buck Shaw	2	1	.667	49ers (1–1) Eagles ^ (1–0)	1960	
78	Joe Stydahar†	2	1	.667	Rams ^	1951	
78	Bill Callahan	2	1	.667	Raiders		
78	Doug Marrone	2	1	.667	Jaguars		
82	Lou Saban	2	2	.500	Bills **	AFL 1964, 1965	
82	Jim Lee Howell	2	2	.500	Giants ^	1956	
82	John Rauch	2	2	.500	Raiders ^	AFL 1967	
82	Forrest Gregg†	2	2	.500	Bengals		
82	Walt Michaels	2	2	.500	Jets		
82	**Dan Campbell**	2	2	.500	Lions		
88	Red Miller	2	3	.400	Broncos		
88	Dick Nolan	2	3	.400	49ers		
88	Art Shell†	2	3	.400	Raiders		
88	Jim Fassel	2	3	.400	Giants		
88	Dave Wannstedt	2	3	.400	Bears (1–1); Dolphins (1–2)		
88	Jason Garrett	2	3	.400	Cowboys		
88	Mike Zimmer	2	3	.400	Vikings		
95	Ray Flaherty†	2	4	.333	Redskins ** (2–2) NY Yankees (0–2)	1937, 1942	
95	Ted Marchibroda	2	4	.333	Colts		
95	Herman Edwards	2	4	.333	Jets (2–3); Chiefs (0–1)		
95	Mike Sherman	2	4	.333	Packers		
95	Jim Caldwell	2	4	.333	Colts (2–2); Lions (0–2)		
95	Bill O'Brien	2	4	.333	Texans		
101	George Allen†	2	7	.222	Rams (0–2); Redskins (2–5)		
102	Steve Owen†	2	8	.200	Giants **	1934, 1938	
103	Potsy Clark	1	0	1.000	Lions ^	1935	
103	Adam Walsh	1	0	1.000	Rams ^	1945	
103	Lou Rymkus	1	0	1.000	Oilers ^	AFL 1960	
106	Hunk Anderson and co-coach Luke Johnsos	1	1	.500	Bears ^	1943	
106	Jimmy Conzelman†	1	1	.500	Cardinals ^	1947	
106	Red Dawson	1	1	.500	Bills (AAFC defunct team)		
106	Mike Holovak	1	1	.500	Patriots		
106	Bart Starr†	1	1	.500	Packers		
106	Dom Capers	1	1	.500	Panthers		
106	Jim Haslett	1	1	.500	Saints		
106	Ray Perkins	1	1	.500	Giants		
106	Rich Kotite	1	1	.500	Eagles		
106	Mike Tice	1	1	.500	Vikings		
106	Jim L. Mora	1	1	.500	Falcons		
106	Vince Tobin	1	1	.500	Cardinals		
106	Bud Carson	1	1	.500	Browns		
106	Dutch Bergman	1	1	.500	Redskins		
106	Mike McCoy	1	1	.500	Chargers		
106	Mike Mularkey	1	1	.500	Titans		
106	Anthony Lynn	1	1	.500	Chargers		
106	Brian Daboll	1	1	.500	Giants		
106	**Ben Johnson**	1	1	.500	Bears		
125	Wally Lemm	1	2	.333	Oilers ^	AFL 1961	
125	Brad Childress	1	2	.333	Vikings		
125	Ray Rhodes	1	2	.333	Eagles		
125	Joe Walton	1	2	.333	Jets		
125	Frank Reich	1	2	.333	Colts		
125	Kevin Stefanski	1	2	.333	Browns		
131	Leeman Bennett	1	3	.250	Falcons		
131	John McKay	1	3	.250	Buccaneers		
131	Jack Del Rio	1	3	.250	Jaguars (1–2); Raiders (0–1)		
131	**Todd Bowles**	1	3	.250	Buccaneers		
135	Wayne Fontes	1	4	.200	Lions		
135	Mike Smith	1	4	.200	Falcons		
137	Sid Gillman†	1	5	.167	Rams (0–1) Chargers ^ (1–4)	AFL 1963	
137	Jack Pardee	1	5	.167	Bears (0–1); Oilers (1–4)		
137	Wade Phillips	1	5	.167	Broncos (0–1); Bills (0–2); Cowboys (1–2)		
Rank	Coach	Wins	Losses	Percent	Team(s) Listed in order coached	Championship Season(s)	Ref

== List of coaches with no playoff victories ==
This is a list of all those that have coached in playoff games that have no wins. All records can be verified at Pro Football Reference.com.

Updated through 2025–26 playoffs.

	**Bold** denotes an active coach
†	Member of the Pro Football Hall of Fame

1 Playoff Loss
Team	Coach
49ers	Frankie Albert
Bears	Neill Armstrong
Bears	Paddy Driscoll^{†}
Bears	Dick Jauron
Bills	Joe Collier
Bills (AAFC)	Clem Crowe
Browns	Butch Davis
Cardinals	Jim Hanifan
Cardinals	Kliff Kingsbury
Chargers	Brandon Staley
Chiefs	Todd Haley
Chiefs	John Mackovic
Colts	Lindy Infante
Colts (AAFC)	Cecil Isbell
Commanders	Dudley DeGroot
Commanders	Jay Gruden
Dolphins	Tony Sparano
Dolphins	Adam Gase
Eagles	Chip Kelly
Falcons	June Jones
Giants	Ben McAdoo
Jaguars	**Liam Coen**
Jets	Bruce Coslet
Jets	Eric Mangini
Lions	Joe Schmidt^{†}
Lions	Jim Schwartz
Packers	Dan Devine
Panthers	**Dave Canales**
Raiders	Rich Bisaccia
Rams	Hamp Pool
Rams	Clark Shaughnessy
Steelers	Jock Sutherland
Oilers	Pop Ivy
Vikings	Leslie Frazier
NY Yankees (AAFC)	Red Strader

2 Playoff Losses
Bears	Matt Nagy
Browns	Nick Skorich
Browns	Sam Rutigliano
Cowboys	Chan Gailey
Dolphins	Mike McDaniel
Lions	Monte Clark
Patriots	Chuck Fairbanks
Patriots; Colts	Ron Meyer
Vikings	**Kevin O'Connell**

3 Playoff Losses
Eagles	Buddy Ryan
Giants	Allie Sherman

6 Playoff Losses
Saints (0–4); Colts (0–2)	Jim Mora

7 Playoff Losses
Bengals	Marvin Lewis

== Playoff appearances ==
Below is a list of the most playoff appearances by an NFL or AAFC head coach (among those with 10 or more postseason appearances); those with the same number are listed based on when they first made the playoffs as a head coach. The most is Andy Reid, who holds the all-time record with 20 playoff appearances over 26 years of coaching the Philadelphia Eagles and the Kansas City Chiefs. In second place is Don Shula with 19 playoff appearances over 33 years of coaching both the Baltimore Colts and Miami Dolphins, and Bill Belichick, who's currently tied with Shula with 19 playoff appearances with 29 years of coaching the Cleveland Browns and the New England Patriots. The years listed are the years where the coaches listed below made the playoffs, not the entire span of the coach's career.

Championship appearances (Super Bowl starting in 1966) are also listed, with championship wins being in bold. Note the AAFC records are now recognized by the NFL as of April 2025, so those playoff seasons from the AAFC in Paul Brown's case are now included.

Key
^	Inducted into the Pro Football Hall of Fame
*	Denotes head coach who is still active in the NFL

Rank	Coach	Team(s)	# of Playoff apps	Years	Championship appearances	Refs
1	Andy Reid^{*}	Philadelphia Eagles (1999–2012); Kansas City Chiefs (2013–present)	20	2000–2004, 2006, 2008–2010, 2013, 2015–2024	2004, **2019**, 2020, **2022**, **2023**, 2024	
2	Don Shula^{^}	Baltimore Colts (1963–1969); Miami Dolphins (1970–1995)	19	1964, 1965, 1968, 1970–1974, 1978, 1979, 1981–1985, 1990, 1992, 1994, 1995	1968, 1971, **1972**, **1973**, 1982, 1984	
2	Bill Belichick	Cleveland Browns (1991–1995); New England Patriots (2000–2023)	19	1994, 2001, 2003–2007, 2009–2019, 2021	**2001**, **2003**, **2004**, 2007, 2011, **2014**, **2016**, 2017, **2018**	
4	Tom Landry^{^}	Dallas Cowboys (1960–1988)	18	1966–1973, 1975–1983, 1985	1970, **1971**, 1975, **1977**, 1978	
5	Paul Brown^{^}	Cleveland Browns (1946–1962); Cincinnati Bengals (1968–1975)	15	1946–1955, 1957, 1958, 1970, 1973, 1975	**1946**, **1947**, **1948**, **1949**, **1950**, 1951, 1952, 1953, **1954**, **1955**, 1957	
6	Marty Schottenheimer	Cleveland Browns (1984–1988); Kansas City Chiefs (1989–1998); Washington Redskins (2000); San Diego Chargers (2002–2006)	13	1985–1988, 1990–1995, 1997, 2004, 2006	None	
6	Mike Tomlin	Pittsburgh Steelers (2007–2025)	13	2007, 2008, 2010, 2011, 2014–2017, 2020, 2021, 2023–2025	**2008**, 2010	
8	Bud Grant^{^}	Minnesota Vikings (1967–1983, 1985)	12	1968–1971, 1973–1978, 1980, 1982	1969, 1973, 1974, 1976	
8	Chuck Noll^{^}	Pittsburgh Steelers (1969–1991)	12	1972–1979, 1982–1984, 1989	**1974**, **1975**, **1978**, **1979**	
8	Mike Holmgren	Green Bay Packers (1993–1998); Seattle Seahawks (1999–2008)	12	1993–1999, 2003–2007	**1996**, 1997, 2005	
8	Pete Carroll	New York Jets (1994); New England Patriots (1997–1999); Seattle Seahawks (2010–2023); Las Vegas Raiders (2025)	12	1997, 1998, 2010, 2012–2016, 2018–2020, 2022	**2013**, 2014	
8	Mike McCarthy	Green Bay Packers (2006–2018); Dallas Cowboys (2020–2024); Pittsburgh Steelers (2026–present)	12	2007, 2009–2016, 2021–2023	**2010**	
8	John Harbaugh^{*}	Baltimore Ravens (2008–2025); New York Giants (2026–present)	12	2008–2012, 2014, 2018–2020, 2022–2024	**2012**	
14	Chuck Knox	Los Angeles Rams (1973–1977, 1992–1994); Buffalo Bills (1978–1982); Seattle Seahawks (1983–1991)	11	1973–1977, 1980, 1981, 1983, 1984, 1987, 1988	None	
14	Tony Dungy^{^}	Tampa Bay Buccaneers (1996–2001); Indianapolis Colts (2002–2008)	11	1997, 1999–2008	**2006**	
14	Sean Payton^{*}	New Orleans Saints (2006–2011) & (2013–2021); Denver Broncos (2023–present)	11	2006, 2009–2011, 2013, 2017–2020, 2024–2025	**2009**	
17	Steve Owen^{^}	New York Giants (1930–1953)	10	1933–1935, 1938, 1939, 1941, 1943, 1944, 1946, 1950	1933, **1934**, 1935, **1938**, 1939, 1941, 1944, 1946	
17	Joe Gibbs^{^}	Washington Redskins (1981–1992, 2004–2007)	10	1982–1984, 1986, 1987, 1990–1992, 2005, 2007	**1982**, 1983, **1987**, **1991**	
17	Bill Parcells^{^}	New York Giants (1983–1990); New England Patriots (1993–1996); New York Jets (1997–1999); Dallas Cowboys (2003–2006)	10	1984–1986, 1989, 1990, 1994, 1996, 1998, 2003, 2006	**1986**, **1990**, 1996	
17	Bill Cowher^{^}	Pittsburgh Steelers (1992–2006)	10	1992–1997, 2001, 2002, 2004, 2005	1995, **2005**	

== See also ==
- List of current NFL head coaches
- List of NFL head coach wins leaders
- List of Super Bowl head coaches
