= 1956 BC Lions season =

Canadian football team season

- Head coach: Clem Crowe
- Home stadium: Empire Stadium

Results
- Record: 6–10
- Division place: 4th, W.I.F.U.
- Playoffs: did not qualify

Uniform

The 1956 BC Lions finished the season in fourth place in the W.I.F.U. with a 6–10 record and failed to make the playoffs.

Under former Ottawa bench boss Clem Crowe, the Lions matched their aggregate win total of the first two seasons (6), however, it was only good enough for 4th place in a tough WIFU. The Lions earned their first win over the Edmonton Eskimos on September 24. Fullback By Bailey scored the first kickoff return touchdown in Lions history against Winnipeg on September 17.

Receiver Dan Edwards, running back Ed Vereb on offence and safety Paul Cameron were WIFU all-stars.

The team altered its uniforms adding UCLA stripes on shoulders.

== Preseason ==
Game	Date	Opponent	Results		Venue	Attendance
Game	Date	Opponent	Score	Record	Venue	Attendance
A	Sat, Aug 5	vs. Edmonton Eskimos	L 21–35	0–1	Empire Stadium	23,566
B	Wed, Aug 8	vs. Hamilton Tiger-Cats	L 26–34	0–2	Empire Stadium	
C	Mon, Aug 13	vs. Toronto Argonauts	W 20–15	1–2	Empire Stadium	

== Regular season ==
=== Season standings ===
Western Interprovincial Football Union
Team	GP	W	L	T	PF	PA	Pts
Edmonton Eskimos	16	11	5	0	358	235	22
Saskatchewan Roughriders	16	10	6	0	353	272	20
Winnipeg Blue Bombers	16	9	7	0	315	228	18
BC Lions	16	6	10	0	251	361	12
Calgary Stampeders	16	4	12	0	229	410	8

=== Season schedule ===
Week	Game	Date	Opponent	Results		Venue	Attendance
Week	Game	Date	Opponent	Score	Record	Venue	Attendance
1	1	Sat, Aug 18	at Calgary Stampeders	W 17–14	1–0	Mewata Stadium	12,889
1	2	Mon, Aug 20	vs. Saskatchewan Roughriders	W 20–3	2–0	Empire Stadium	28,825
2	3	Mon, Aug 27	vs. Edmonton Eskimos	L 0–18	2–1	Empire Stadium	30,374
3	4	Fri, Aug 31	at Winnipeg Blue Bombers	L 1–3	2–2	Winnipeg Stadium	15,727
3	5	Mon, Sept 3	at Saskatchewan Roughriders	L 10–24	2–3	Taylor Field	13,000
4	6	Sat, Sept 8	vs. Calgary Stampeders	W 45–15	3–3	Empire Stadium	28,737
5	7	Sat, Sept 15	at Edmonton Eskimos	L 8–34	3–4	Clarke Stadium	21,737
5	8	Mon, Sept 17	vs. Winnipeg Blue Bombers	L 15–16	3–5	Empire Stadium	21,737
6	9	Mon, Sept 24	vs. Edmonton Eskimos	W 11–1	4–5	Empire Stadium	23,066
7	10	Sat, Sept 29	at Saskatchewan Roughriders	L 28–46	4–6	Taylor Field	14,000
7	11	Mon, Oct 1	at Winnipeg Blue Bombers	L 7–34	4–7	Winnipeg Stadium	16,467
8	12	Sat, Oct 6	vs. Calgary Stampeders	W 24–7	5–7	Empire Stadium	25,663
9	13	Sat, Oct 13	vs. Winnipeg Blue Bombers	L 8–30	5–8	Empire Stadium	26,300
9	14	Mon, Oct 15	at Calgary Stampeders	W 22–21	6–8	Mewata Stadium	10,000
10	15	Sat, Oct 20	vs. Saskatchewan Roughriders	L 22–25	6–9	Empire Stadium	18,239
10	16	Mon, Oct 22	at Edmonton Eskimos	L 13–54	6–10	Clarke Stadium	

=== Offensive leaders ===
Player	Passing yds	Rushing yds	Receiving yds	TD
Jerry Gustafson	1214	43	0	3
By Bailey		620	294	4
Paul Cameron	199	430	428	3
Dan Edwards		0	672	3
Ed Vereb		514	178	14
Al Pollard		468	86	2

== 1956 Canadian Football Awards ==
None
