= 1956 Calgary Stampeders season =

Canadian football team season

- General manager: Bob Masterson
- Head coach: Otis Douglas
- Home stadium: Mewata Stadium

Results
- Record: 4–12
- Division place: 5th
- Playoffs: did not qualify

The 1956 Calgary Stampeders finished in fifth place in the W.I.F.U. with a 4–12 record and failed to make the playoffs.

== Regular season ==
=== Season standings ===
Western Interprovincial Football Union
Team	GP	W	L	T	PF	PA	Pts
Edmonton Eskimos	16	11	5	0	358	235	22
Saskatchewan Roughriders	16	10	6	0	353	272	20
Winnipeg Blue Bombers	16	9	7	0	315	228	18
BC Lions	16	6	10	0	251	361	12
Calgary Stampeders	16	4	12	0	229	410	8

=== Season schedule ===
Week	Game	Date	Opponent	Results		Venue	Attendance
Week	Game	Date	Opponent	Score	Record	Venue	Attendance
	1	Sat, Aug 18	vs. BC Lions	L 14–17	0–1	Mewata Stadium	12,889
	2	Sat, Aug 25	at Edmonton Eskimos	L 22–23	0–2	Clarke Stadium	16,500
	3	Mon, Aug 27	at Winnipeg Blue Bombers	L 15–16	0–3	Winnipeg Stadium	16,687
	4	Sat, Sept 1	vs. Saskatchewan Roughriders	W 27–17	1–3	Mewata Stadium	12,000
	5	Sat, Sept 8	at BC Lions	L 15–45	1–4	Empire Stadium	28,737
	6	Mon, Sept 10	vs. Edmonton Eskimos	L 15–28	1–5	Mewata Stadium	12,000
	7	Sat, Sept 15	vs. Winnipeg Blue Bombers	W 16–6	2–5	Mewata Stadium	12,789
	8	Mon, Sept 17	at Saskatchewan Roughriders	L 1–18	2–6	Taylor Field	14,000
	9	Sat, Sept 22	at Edmonton Eskimos	L 0–52	2–7	Clarke Stadium	20,000
	10	Sat, Sept 29	vs. Winnipeg Blue Bombers	L 14–37	2–8	Mewata Stadium	12,000
	11	Sat, Oct 6	at BC Lions	L 7–24	2–9	Empire Stadium	25,663
	12	Mon, Oct 8	vs. Edmonton Eskimos	L 8–36	2–10	Mewata Stadium	11,261
	13	Mon, Oct 15	vs. BC Lions	L 21–22	2–11	Mewata Stadium	10,000
	14	Sat, Oct 20	at Winnipeg Blue Bombers	W 25–17	3–11	Winnipeg Stadium	15,922
	15	Mon, Oct 22	vs. Saskatchewan Roughriders	W 29–19	4–11	Mewata Stadium	9,000
	16	Sat, Oct 27	at Saskatchewan Roughriders	L 0–33	4–12	Taylor Field	8,000

== Awards and records ==
- None
