= 1953 Ottawa Rough Riders season =

Canadian football team season

- Head coach: Clem Crowe
- Home stadium: Lansdowne Park

Results
- Record: 7–7
- Division place: 3rd, IRFU
- Playoffs: Did not qualify

The 1953 Ottawa Rough Riders finished in third place in the IRFU with a 7–7 record and failed to qualify for the playoffs.

== Preseason ==
Week	Date	Opponent	Result	Record
A	Aug 15	at Winnipeg Blue Bombers	L 11–18	0–1
A	Aug 17	at Edmonton Eskimos	L 9–12	0–2

== Regular season ==
=== Standings ===
Interprovincial Rugby Football Union
Team	GP	W	L	T	PF	PA	Pts
Montreal Alouettes	14	8	6	0	292	229	16
Hamilton Tiger-Cats	14	8	6	0	229	243	16
Ottawa Rough Riders	14	7	7	0	266	238	14
Toronto Argonauts	14	5	9	0	172	249	10

=== Schedule ===
Week	Game	Date	Opponent	Result	Record
1	1	Aug 29	at Hamilton Tiger-Cats	L 10–14	0–1
2	2	Sept 5	vs. Montreal Alouettes	W 26–6	1–1
3	3	Sept 12	at Toronto Argonauts	W 20–16	2–1
4	4	Sept 16	vs. Montreal Alouettes	W 22–13	3–1
4	4	Sept 20	at Montreal Alouettes	L 21–37	3–2
5	6	Sept 26	vs. Toronto Argonauts	L 17–18	3–3
6	7	Oct 3	vs. Hamilton Tiger-Cats	W 31–6	4–3
7	8	Oct 10	vs. Montreal Alouettes	L 6–24	4–4
7	9	Oct 11	at Montreal Alouettes	L 18–26	4–5
8	10	Oct 17	vs. Hamilton Tiger-Cats	L 24–33	4–6
9	11	Oct 25	at Montreal Alouettes	W 30–15	5–6
10	12	Oct 31	at Toronto Argonauts	W 20–8	6–6
11	13	Nov 7	vs. Toronto Argonauts	W 13–4	7–6
12	14	Nov 14	at Hamilton Tiger-Cats	L 8–18	7–7
