= 1954 Ottawa Rough Riders season =

Canadian football team season

- Head coach: Clem Crowe
- Home stadium: Lansdowne Park

Results
- Record: 2–12
- Division place: 4th, IRFU
- Playoffs: Did not qualify

The 1954 Ottawa Rough Riders finished in fourth place in the IRFU with a 2–12 record and failed to qualify for the playoffs.

== Preseason ==
Week	Date	Opponent	Result	Record
A	Aug 13	vs. Winnipeg Blue Bombers	L 6–29	0–1
A	Aug 16	vs. Edmonton Eskimos	W 19–18	1–1

== Regular season ==
=== Standings ===
Interprovincial Rugby Football Union
Team	GP	W	L	T	PF	PA	Pts
Montreal Alouettes	14	11	3	0	341	148	22
Hamilton Tiger-Cats	14	9	5	0	275	207	18
Toronto Argonauts	14	6	8	0	212	265	12
Ottawa Rough Riders	14	2	12	0	129	337	4

=== Schedule ===
Week	Game	Date	Opponent	Result	Record
1	1	Aug 28	at Toronto Argonauts	L 6–13	0–1
2	2	Sept 4	at Montreal Alouettes	L 2–21	0–2
2	3	Sept 6	vs. Montreal Alouettes	L 11–20	0–3
3	4	Sept 11	at Toronto Argonauts	W 12–5	1–3
4	5	Sept 18	vs. Toronto Argonauts	L 6–34	1–4
5	6	Sept 25	vs. Hamilton Tiger-Cats	L 12–38	1–5
6	7	Oct 2	at Hamilton Tiger-Cats	L 0–45	1–6
7	8	Oct 9	vs. Montreal Alouettes	L 11–25	1–7
7	9	Oct 11	at Montreal Alouettes	L 6–24	1–8
8	10	Oct 16	vs. Toronto Argonauts	L 11–27	1–9
9	11	Oct 23	at Hamilton Tiger-Cats	L 17–25	1–10
10	12	Oct 30	vs. Hamilton Tiger-Cats	L 9–30	1–11
11	13	Nov 6	at Toronto Argonauts	L 12–18	1–12
12	14	Nov 13	vs. Montreal Alouettes	W 14–12	2–12
