= 1952 Ottawa Rough Riders season =

Canadian football team season

- Head coach: Clem Crowe
- Home stadium: Lansdowne Park

Results
- Record: 5–7
- Division place: 3rd, IRFU
- Playoffs: Did not qualify

The 1952 Ottawa Rough Riders finished in third place in the IRFU with a 5–7 record and failed to qualify for the playoffs.

== Preseason ==
Week	Date	Opponent	Result	Record
A	Aug 9	vs. Winnipeg Blue Bombers	L 6–24	0–1

== Regular season ==
=== Standings ===
Interprovincial Rugby Football Union
Team	GP	W	L	T	PF	PA	Pts
Hamilton Tiger-Cats	12	9	2	1	268	162	19
Toronto Argonauts	12	7	4	1	265	191	15
Ottawa Rough Riders	12	5	7	0	200	238	10
Montreal Alouettes	12	2	10	0	136	278	4

=== Schedule ===
Week	Game	Date	Opponent	Result	Record
1	1	Aug 27	at Montreal Alouettes	W 32–28	1–0
2	2	Sept 6	vs. Hamilton Tiger-Cats	L 8–30	1–1
3	3	Sept 13	at Toronto Argonauts	L 19–24	1–2
4	4	Sept 20	vs. Montreal Alouettes	W 8–7	2–2
5	5	Sept 27	at Hamilton Tiger-Cats	L 13–27	2–3
6	6	Oct 4	vs. Toronto Argonauts	W 25–21	3–3
7	7	Oct 11	vs. Montreal Alouettes	W 25–12	4–3
7	8	Oct 12	at Montreal Alouettes	W 23–6	5–3
8	9	Oct 18	vs. Toronto Argonauts	L 6–25	5–4
9	10	Oct 25	at Toronto Argonauts	L 14–20	5–5
10	11	Nov 1	at Hamilton Tiger-Cats	L 23–25	5–6
11	12	Nov 8	vs. Hamilton Tiger-Cats	L 4–13	5–7
