= Jordon Hudson =

American entrepreneur (born 2001)

- Born: Jordon Isabella Roosevelt Hudson; April 3, 2001 (age 25); Ellsworth, Maine, U.S.
- Education: Bridgewater State University (BA)
- Partner: Bill Belichick (2023–2025)

Jordon Isabella Roosevelt Hudson (born April 3, 2001) is an American pageant contestant and former cheerleader. She was the girlfriend of American football coach Bill Belichick from 2023 to 2025, the head coach for the North Carolina Tar Heels and former head coach for the New England Patriots. The age gap of 49 years between the couple and Hudson's role in Belichick's professional life was the subject of significant media coverage and public attention.

== Biography ==
Jordon Isabella Roosevelt Hudson was born on April 3, 2001, in Ellsworth, Maine to Lee and Heath Hudson. Her hometown is Hancock, Maine. Her parents owned Frenchmans Bay Fisheries, a mussel and seaweed farming business. Around 2010, Hudson moved with her mother and siblings to Provincetown, Massachusetts. While she was in high school, she started working at a salon in town. She graduated from Nauset Regional High School in 2019.

Hudson attended Bridgewater State University, graduating with a BA in philosophy in 2022. Hudson was a cheerleader at Bridgewater; her team won a National Cheerleaders Association Collegiate Championship in 2021.

Hudson and Bill Belichick have stated they met on a flight to Palm Beach. She and Belichick started appearing in public together in December 2024.

By 2023, Hudson has amassed a real estate portfolio estimated to be worth around US$8 million.

In 2024, Hudson competed for the title of Miss Maine USA. She was the first runner-up. In 2025, she again competed for the title, placing third.

In 2025, Belichick became the head coach of the North Carolina Tar Heels football team. During the first few months of his tenure, Hudson became a highly visible member of his public relations team. In February 2025, it was announced that Belichick was to be featured on the HBO docuseries Hard Knocks. The deal fell apart days later. Hudson was reported to have played a role in stopping the production. In March 2025, Belichick requested to a UNC administrator that Hudson be copied on certain emails.

In August 2025, Hudson filed several trademark applications, including for the phrase "gold digger," to use on jewelry and key chains.
