= 1956 Edmonton Eskimos season =

Canadian football team season

- General manager: Al Anderson
- Head coach: Pop Ivy
- Home stadium: Clarke Stadium

Results
- Record: 11–5
- Division place: 1st, WIFU
- Playoffs: Won Grey Cup

The 1956 Edmonton Eskimos finished in first place in the Western Interprovincial Football Union with an 11–5 record and won the 44th Grey Cup, completing the first Grey Cup three-peat in the modern era.

== Pre-season ==
=== Schedule ===
Game	Date	Opponent	Results		Venue	Attendance
Game	Date	Opponent	Score	Record	Venue	Attendance
A	Sat, Aug 4	at BC Lions	W 35–21	1–0	Empire Stadium	23,566
B	Wed, Aug 8	at Montreal Alouettes	L 0–33	1–1	McGill Stadium	
B	Fri, Aug 10	at Ottawa Rough Riders	L 13–33	1–2	Lansdowne Park	10,000

== Regular season ==
=== Season standings ===
Western Interprovincial Football Union
Team	GP	W	L	T	PF	PA	Pts
Edmonton Eskimos	16	11	5	0	358	235	22
Saskatchewan Roughriders	16	10	6	0	353	272	20
Winnipeg Blue Bombers	16	9	7	0	315	228	18
BC Lions	16	6	10	0	251	361	12
Calgary Stampeders	16	4	12	0	229	410	8

=== Season schedule ===
Week	Game	Date	Opponent	Results		Venue	Attendance
Week	Game	Date	Opponent	Score	Record	Venue	Attendance
1	1	Sat, Aug 18	vs. Saskatchewan Roughriders	W 15–3	1–0	Clarke Stadium	16,500
2	2	Sat, Aug 25	vs. Calgary Stampeders	W 23–22	2–0	Clarke Stadium	16,500
2	3	Mon, Aug 27	at BC Lions	W 18–0	3–0	Empire Stadium	30,374
3	4	Mon, Sept 3	vs. Winnipeg Blue Bombers	W 21–20	4–0	Clarke Stadium	15,000
4	5	Sat, Sept 8	at Saskatchewan Roughriders	L 4–31	4–1	Taylor Field	13,500
4	6	Mon, Sept 10	at Calgary Stampeders	W 28–15	5–1	Mewata Stadium	12,000
5	7	Sat, Sept 15	vs. BC Lions	W 34–8	6–1	Clarke Stadium	21,737
6	8	Sat, Sept 22	vs. Calgary Stampeders	W 52–0	7–1	Clarke Stadium	20,000
6	9	Mon, Sept 24	at BC Lions	L 1–11	7–2	Empire Stadium	23,066
7	10	Mon, Oct 1	vs. Saskatchewan Roughriders	L 7–33	7–3	Clarke Stadium	20,000
8	11	Sat, Oct 6	at Winnipeg Blue Bombers	L 7–10	7–4	Winnipeg Stadium	18,700
8	12	Mon, Oct 8	at Calgary Stampeders	W 36–8	8–4	Mewata Stadium	11,261
9	13	Sat, Oct 13	at Saskatchewan Roughriders	W 37–17	9–4	Taylor Field	14,500
9	14	Mon, Oct 15	vs. Winnipeg Blue Bombers	W 21–11	10–4	Clarke Stadium	20,000
10	15	Mon, Oct 22	vs. BC Lions	W 54–13	11–4	Clarke Stadium	
11	16	Sat, Oct 27	at Winnipeg Blue Bombers	L 0–33	11–5	Winnipeg Stadium	14,409

== Playoffs ==
Round	Date	Opponent	Results		Venue	Attendance
Round	Date	Opponent	Score	Record	Venue	Attendance
Western Final #1	Sat, Nov 10	at Saskatchewan Roughriders	L 22–23	0–1	Taylor Field	13,500
Western Final #2	Mon, Nov 12	vs. Saskatchewan Roughriders	W 20–12	1–1	Clarke Stadium	19,000
Western Final #3	Sat, Nov 17	vs. Saskatchewan Roughriders	W 51–7	2–1	Clarke Stadium	22,461
Grey Cup	Sat, Nov 24	vs. Montreal Alouettes	W 50–27	3–1	Varsity Stadium	27,425

=== Grey Cup ===
Teams	1 Q	2 Q	3 Q	4 Q	Final
Edmonton Eskimos	12	14	12	12	50
Montreal Alouettes	10	10	0	7	27
