= Clem Crowe =

American college football and basketball player and coach (1903–1983)

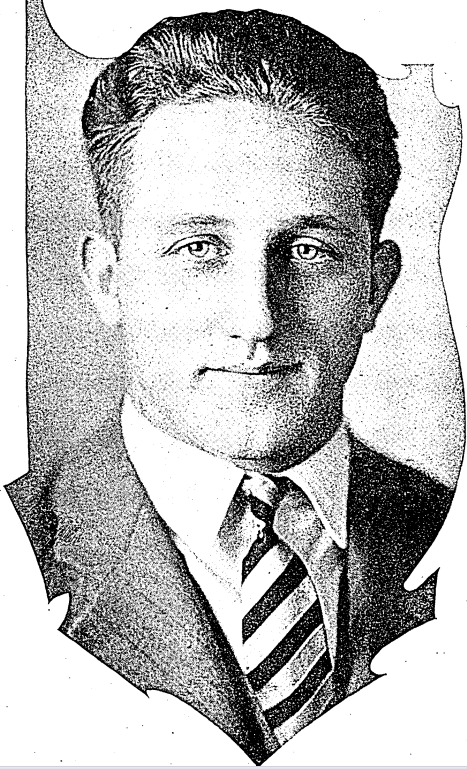
- Crowe in 1925

Biographical details
- Born: October 18, 1903; Lafayette, Indiana, U.S.
- Died: April 13, 1983 (aged 79); Rochester, New York, U.S.

Playing career

Football
- 1923–1925: Notre Dame

Basketball
- 1923–1926: Notre Dame
- Positions: End (football); Forward (basketball)

Coaching career (HC unless noted)

Football
- 1926–1931: Saint Vincent
- 1932–1935: Xavier (line)
- 1935–1943: Xavier
- 1944: Notre Dame (assistant)
- 1945: Iowa
- 1949: Buffalo Bills (AAFC)
- 1950: Baltimore Colts (NFL)
- 1951–1954: Ottawa Rough Riders (CFL)
- 1956–1958: BC Lions (CFL)

Basketball
- 1928–1932: Saint Vincent
- 1933–1943: Xavier
- 1944–1945: Notre Dame

Head coaching record
- Overall: 71–66–5 (college football); 152–115 (college basketball)

Clem F. Crowe (October 18, 1903 – April 13, 1983) was an American gridiron football and basketball player and coach. He served as the head football coach at Saint Vincent College (1926–1931), Xavier University (1936–1943), and the University of Iowa (1945), compiling a career college football record of 71–66–5. Crowe was also the head basketball coach at Saint Vincent College (1928–1932), Xavier (1933–1943), and the University of Notre Dame (1944–1945), tallying a career college basketball mark of 152–115.

He later coached professional football for the Buffalo Bills and Baltimore Colts of the All-America Football Conference (AAFC) and National Football League (NFL), and the Ottawa Rough Riders and BC Lions of the Canadian Football League (CFL).

== Playing career ==
Crowe played college football and basketball at the University of Notre Dame. He earned three letters in basketball and was a basketball All-American. He also earned three letters in football under Coach Knute Rockne. Crowe played football from 1923 to 1925 and was a two-time All-American. He played end for Notre Dame's "Seven Mule" team and was named Notre Dame's football captain in 1925.

== College coaching career ==
After graduation, Crowe took a position as a coach at Saint Vincent College in Latrobe, Pennsylvania. There he coached the football team from 1926 to 1931, compiling a record of 23–27–3, and the basketball team from 1928 to 1932, tallying a 41–31 mark in four seasons.

Crowe left Saint Vincent in 1932 and took a job at Xavier University. He coached the Xavier basketball team from 1933 to 1943 and had a 96–79 record in ten seasons. He also coached the Xavier football team from 1935 to 1943 and compiled a 46–32–2 record. In addition, Crowe was a baseball coach and a golf coach at Xavier. He was inducted into the Xavier University Athletics Hall of Fame in 1994.

Crowe left Xavier in 1943 and returned to his alma mater. He was an assistant football coach at Notre Dame in 1944 and the head basketball coach for the 1944–45 season.

In 1945, Crowe was hired on an interim basis as the 17th head football coach at the University of Iowa while Iowa's regular coach, Eddie Anderson, was serving with the U.S. Army Medical Corps during World War II. Following Crowe's one season, in which he had a 2–7 record, Anderson returned, and Crowe left the Iowa football program.

== Professional coaching career ==
Crowe resurfaced in 1949 as the head coach of the Buffalo Bills of the All-America Football Conference, going 4–1–1 after succeeding Red Dawson. When the Buffalo franchise folded, he left to coach the Baltimore Colts, an expansion team in the National Football League (NFL) in 1950. The team suffered a winless 7 game preseason before posting a 1–11 record in the regular campaign, leading to the termination of that franchise as well.

Art Donovan had this to say of Crowe, his coach during his 1950 rookie season with the Colts: "This sonofabitch was crazy, and my first training camp immediately became one of the worst experiences of my life. First of all, Crowe must have had 150 players in camp, and all we did was scrimmage. No drills. No chalk talk. No run-throughs of plays. Just hot, humid, bone-breaking, full-pad scrimmages.... For my first couple of days in camp I wasn't even issued pads."

Crowe then headed north to Canada and agreed to coach the Ottawa Rough Riders of the Canadian Football League in 1951. In his first season in Ottawa, he led the Rough Riders to the Grey Cup. He later left Ottawa for the BC Lions. He was a head coach in Vancouver from 1956 to 1958. Crowe died in Rochester, New York, on April 13, 1983, at age 79.

== Head coaching record ==
=== College football ===
Year	Team	Overall	Conference	Standing	Bowl/playoffs
Saint Vincent Bearcats (Independent) (1926–1931)
1926	Saint Vincent	3–5			
1927	Saint Vincent	1–6–1			
1928	Saint Vincent	6–3			
1929	Saint Vincent	4–4–1			
1930	Saint Vincent	4–6			
1931	Saint Vincent	5–3–1			
Saint Vincent:		23–27–3			
Xavier Musketeers (Independent) (1935–1943)
1935	Xavier	5–1 (Note: Joseph A. Meyer resigned after the first three games of the 1935 season. He was replaced by Crowe, who led the team for the final six games. Xavier finished the year with an overall record of 6–3.)			
1936	Xavier	6–4			
1937	Xavier	4–5–1			
1938	Xavier	7–2			
1939	Xavier	3–5–1			
1940	Xavier	7–3			
1941	Xavier	9–1			
1942	Xavier	4–5			
1943	Xavier	1–6			
Xavier:		46–32–2			
Iowa Hawkeyes (Big Ten Conference) (1945)
1945	Iowa	2–7	1–5	T–8th	
Iowa:		2–7	1–5		
Total:		71–66–5			

=== Professional football ===
Team	Year	Regular season					Postseason			
Team	Year	Won	Lost	Ties	Win %	Finish	Won	Lost	Win %	Result
BUF	1949	4	1	1	.750	3rd in AAFC	0	1	.000	Lost to Cleveland Browns in AAFC Divisional Playoffs.
AAFC total		4	1	1	.750		0	1	.000	–
BAL	1950	1	11	0	.083	13th in NFL	–	–	–	–
NFL total		1	11	0	.083		–	–	–	–
OTT	1951	7	5	0	.583	1st in IRFU	4	0	1.000	Won over Saskatchewan Roughriders in 39th Grey Cup.
OTT	1952	5	7	0	.417	3rd in IRFU	–	–	–	–
OTT	1953	7	7	0	.500	3rd in IRFU	–	–	–	–
OTT	1954	2	12	0	.143	4th in IRFU	–	–	–	–
OTT total		21	31	0	.404		4	0	1.000	–
BC	1956	6	10	0	.375	4th in W.I.F.U	–	–	–	–
BC	1957	4	11	1	.281	4th in W.I.F.U	–	–	–	–
BC	1958	0	5	0	.000	5th in W.I.F.U	–	–	–	–
BC total		10	26	1	.284		–	–	–	–
CFL total		31	57	1	.354		4	0	1.000	–
Total		36	69	2	.346		4	1	.800	–
