= Bill Belichick =

American football coach (born 1952)

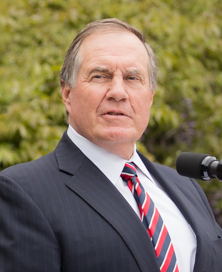
- Belichick in 2017

Current position
- Title: Head coach
- Team: North Carolina
- Conference: ACC
- Record: 9–14
- Annual salary: $10 million

Biographical details
- Born: April 16, 1952 (age 74); Nashville, Tennessee, U.S.

Playing career
- 1971–1974: Wesleyan
- Positions: Center; Tight end

Coaching career (HC unless noted)
- 1975: Baltimore Colts (special assistant)
- 1976: Detroit Lions (assistant ST)
- 1977: Detroit Lions (WR/TE)
- 1978: Denver Broncos (assistant ST/def. assistant)
- 1979: New York Giants (ST/def. assistant)
- 1980–1984: New York Giants (ST/LB)
- 1985–1990: New York Giants (DC)
- 1991–1995: Cleveland Browns
- 1996: New England Patriots (assistant HC/DB)
- 1997–1999: New York Jets (assistant HC/DC)
- 2000–2023: New England Patriots
- 2025–present: North Carolina

Administrative career (AD unless noted)
- 1992–1995: Cleveland Browns (De facto GM)
- 2000–2023: New England Patriots (De facto GM)

Head coaching record
- Overall: 9–14 (NCAA); 333–178 (NFL)
- Tournaments: 31–13 (NFL playoffs)

Accomplishments and honors

Championships
- As a head coach: 6× Super Bowl champion (XXXVI, XXXVIII, XXXIX, XLIX, LI, LIII); As an assistant coach: 2× Super Bowl champion (XXI, XXV)

Awards
- As a head coach: 3× AP NFL Coach of the Year (2003, 2007, 2010); Maxwell Club NFL Coach of the Year (2007); NFL 2000s All-Decade Team; NFL 2010s All-Decade Team; NFL 100th Anniversary All-Time Team; New England Patriots All-2000s Team; New England Patriots 50th Anniversary Team; New England Patriots All-2010s Team; New England Patriots All-Dynasty Team; As an executive: PFWA Executive of the Year (2021)

Records
- NFL records: Most Super Bowl wins: 8; Most Super Bowl wins as a head coach: 6; Most Super Bowl appearances: 12; Most Super Bowl appearances as a head coach: 9; Most playoff wins as a head coach: 31; Most playoff appearances as a head coach: 19 (tied); Most divisional championships as a head coach: 17

William Stephen Belichick (/ˈbɛlɪtʃɪk, -tʃɛk/ BEL-itch-ik, -ek; born April 16, 1952) is an American football coach who is the head coach for the North Carolina Tar Heels. Regarded as one of the greatest head coaches ever, he holds numerous coaching records, including the record of most Super Bowl wins (six) as a head coach, all with the New England Patriots, along with two more during his time as the defensive coordinator of the New York Giants, for a record eight total Super Bowl victories as coach and coordinator. A renowned American football historian, Belichick is often referred to as a "student of the game" with a deep knowledge of the intricacies of each player position. During his tenure with the Patriots, Belichick was a central figure as the head coach and de facto general manager during the team's dynasty from 2001 to 2019.

Belichick is a descendant of Bill Parcells's coaching tree. He began his coaching career in 1975 as an assistant for the Baltimore Colts and became the defensive coordinator for New York Giants head coach Parcells by 1985. Parcells and Belichick won two Super Bowls together before Belichick left to become the head coach of the Cleveland Browns in 1991. He remained in Cleveland for five seasons but was fired following the team's 1995 season. Belichick rejoined Parcells, first in New England, where the team lost Super Bowl XXXI, and later with the New York Jets. After being named head coach of the Jets, Belichick resigned after only one day on the job to accept the head coaching job for the Patriots on January 27, 2000. In 24 seasons under Belichick, the Patriots won 17 AFC East division titles, made 13 appearances in the AFC Championship Game, and appeared in nine Super Bowls, with a record six wins. Overall, Belichick has won eight Super Bowl titles (the most of any individual in NFL history) and finished as runner-up four times from his combined time as an assistant and head coach.

At the time Belichick left the Patriots, he was the NFL's longest-tenured active head coach. Belichick has the most playoff coaching wins all-time with 31 and ranks third in regular-season coaching wins in the NFL with 302. He is also in second place for combined regular-season and postseason wins, and also second place for most regular-season coaching wins with one franchise. Belichick is one of only three head coaches who have won six NFL titles. He was named the AP NFL Coach of the Year for the 2003, 2007, and 2010 seasons. Belichick has also been selected to the NFL 2000s All-Decade Team, NFL 2010s All-Decade Team, and the NFL 100th Anniversary All-Time Team.

== Early life and education ==
Belichick was born in Nashville, Tennessee, on April 16, 1952, the son of Jeannette (née Munn) and Steve Belichick. Belichick was named after College Football Hall of Fame coach Bill Edwards, who was his godfather. He is of Croatian ancestry; his paternal grandparents, Marija Barković and Ivan Biličić, emigrated from Draganić in 1897 and settled in Monessen, Pennsylvania, having changed their names to Mary and John Belichick at the suggestion of immigration officers.

Belichick was raised in Annapolis, Maryland, where his father was an assistant football coach at the United States Naval Academy. His father wrote Football Scouting Methods (1962), which his mother edited. Belichick has said his father is one of his most important football mentors, and Belichick often studied football with him. He reportedly learned to break down game films at a young age by watching his father and the Navy staff do their jobs. Belichick graduated from Annapolis High School in 1970, where he was a classmate of Sally Brice-O'Hara, who would later become the Vice Commandant of the Coast Guard. While there, Belichick played football and lacrosse, with the latter being his favorite sport. Belichick enrolled at Phillips Academy in Andover, Massachusetts, for a postgraduate year, with the intention of improving his grades and test scores to be admitted into a quality college. The school honored Belichick 40 years later by inducting him into its Athletics Hall of Honor in 2011.

Belichick attended Wesleyan University in Middletown, Connecticut, where he played center and tight end. In addition to being a member of the football team, Belichick played lacrosse and squash, serving as the captain of the lacrosse team during his senior season. A member of Chi Psi fraternity, Belichick earned a bachelor's degree in economics in 1975. Eventually, he was part of the inaugural induction class into the university's Athletics Hall of Fame in spring 2008.

== Coaching career ==
=== Early coaching positions ===
After graduating, Belichick took a $25-per-week job as an assistant to Baltimore Colts head coach Ted Marchibroda in 1975. In 1976, Belichick joined the Detroit Lions as their assistant special teams coach before adding tight ends and wide receivers to his coaching duties in 1977. Belichick was dismissed along with head coach Tommy Hudspeth and the rest of the coaching staff on January 9, 1978. He spent the 1978 season with the Denver Broncos as their assistant special teams coach and defensive assistant while also serving as director of films.

=== New York Giants (1979–1990) ===
In 1979, Belichick began a 12-year stint with the New York Giants alongside head coach Ray Perkins as a defensive assistant and special teams coach. Belichick added linebackers coaching to his duties in 1980 and was named defensive coordinator in 1985 under head coach Bill Parcells, who had replaced Perkins in 1983. The Giants won Super Bowl XXI and Super Bowl XXV following the 1986 and 1990 seasons. Belichick's defensive game plan from the New York Giants' 20–19 upset of the Buffalo Bills in Super Bowl XXV has been placed in the Pro Football Hall of Fame.

=== Cleveland Browns (1991–1995) ===
From 1991 until 1995, Belichick was the head coach of the Cleveland Browns. During his tenure in Cleveland, Belichick compiled a 36–44 record, leading the team to the playoffs in 1994, his only winning year with the team. Coincidentally, Belichick's lone playoff victory during his Browns tenure was achieved against the New England Patriots, who were coached by former Giants head coach Bill Parcells, in the Wild Card Round during that postseason. In Belichick's final season in Cleveland, the Browns finished 5–11 despite starting 3–1. One of his most controversial moves was cutting quarterback Bernie Kosar midway through the 1993 season. Kosar was signed by the Dallas Cowboys two days later and won a Super Bowl with the Cowboys in Super Bowl XXVIII as a backup. In November 1995, in the middle of the ongoing football season, Browns owner Art Modell had announced he would move his franchise to Baltimore after the season. After first being given assurances that he would coach the new team that would later become the Baltimore Ravens, Belichick was instead fired on February 14, 1996, a week after the shift was officially announced.

In the 2013 episode of A Football Life on the Cleveland Browns relocation controversy, many sports journalists who had covered the Browns at the time said that in retrospect, Belichick had laid the groundwork and set up the infrastructure for the Ravens' success in the ensuing decades, including their win in Super Bowl XXXV (with Cleveland holdovers Matt Stover and Rob Burnett still with the team at that point), by giving recently retired tight end Ozzie Newsome his first front-office job, and had also planned on drafting Ray Lewis in the 1996 NFL draft if Belichick and the team had stayed in Cleveland. (Indeed, the newly christened Ravens did draft Lewis, who went on to a 17-year Hall of Fame career with the team.) Those who had covered the Browns went on to state that if the original Browns had stayed in Cleveland, Belichick would have seen his work through. For his part, Belichick stated that he was able to learn from some mistakes he had made with the Browns while largely sticking to his blueprint from Cleveland when resurrecting the Patriots, such as factoring in off-the-field issues that can affect performance. Among those interviewed, the consensus was that Belichick's failure in Cleveland had more to do with Modell's financial struggles (even paying a young Scott Pioli only $14,000/year—equivalent to $32,447 in 2024—as a scout) that eventually led the NFL to force the sale of the Ravens to Steve Bisciotti than Belichick's own doing.

=== New England Patriots (1996) ===
After his dismissal by the Cleveland Browns, Belichick served under Parcells again as assistant head coach and defensive backs coach with the New England Patriots for the 1996 season. The Patriots finished with an 11–5 record and won the AFC Championship over the Jacksonville Jaguars, but they lost to the Green Bay Packers in Super Bowl XXXI amid rumors of Parcells's impending defection.

=== New York Jets (1997–1999) ===
Belichick had two stints as the head coach of the New York Jets without ever coaching a game.

In February 1997, Belichick, who had been an assistant coach under Bill Parcells with the New York Giants and New England Patriots, was named the Jets' interim head coach while the Jets and Patriots continued to negotiate compensation to release Parcells from his contract with the Patriots and allow Parcells to coach the Jets. Six days later, the Patriots and Jets reached an agreement that allowed Parcells to coach the Jets, and Belichick became the team's assistant head coach and defensive coordinator.

When Parcells stepped down as head coach after the 1999 season, he had already arranged with team management to have Belichick succeed him. However, Belichick was the Jets' head coach for only one day. On January 4, 2000, when Belichick was introduced as head coach to the media—the day after his hiring was publicized—he turned it into a surprise resignation announcement. Before taking the podium, Belichick scrawled a resignation note on a napkin that read, in its entirety, "I resign as HC of the NYJ." He then delivered a half-hour speech explaining his resignation to the assembled press corps.

Soon after this bizarre turn of events, Belichick was introduced as the Patriots' 12th full-time head coach, succeeding the recently fired Pete Carroll. The Patriots had inquired to the Jets about permission to interview him for their vacant spot at head coach just before Parcells stepping down. Parcells and the Jets claimed that Belichick was still under contract to the Jets, and demanded compensation from the Patriots. NFL Commissioner Paul Tagliabue agreed, and the Patriots gave the Jets a first-round draft pick in 2000 in exchange for the right to hire Belichick.

=== New England Patriots (2000–2023) ===
Soon after hiring Belichick, owner Robert Kraft gave him near-complete control over the team's football operations, making him the de facto general manager as well. Until 2009, Belichick split many of the duties normally held by a general manager at other clubs with player personnel director Scott Pioli. However, Belichick had the final say on football matters. Pioli left for the Kansas City Chiefs after the 2008 season.

The Patriots went 5–11 in the 2000 regular season and missed the playoffs.

==== First three Super Bowl wins: 2001–2004 ====
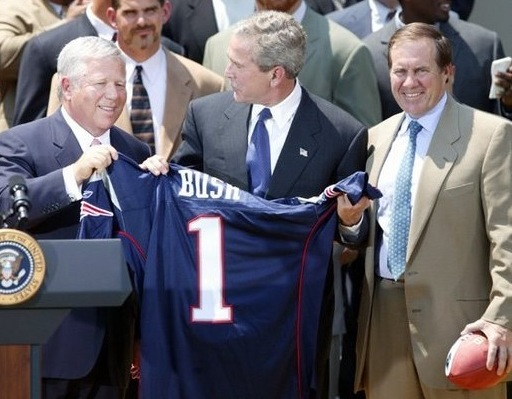
Belichick (right) during the Patriots' visit to the White House in 2004

In 2001, the Patriots went 11–5 in the regular season, and in the playoffs defeated the Oakland Raiders (in the "Tuck Rule Game") and Pittsburgh Steelers on the way to the Super Bowl. In Super Bowl XXXVI, Belichick's defense held the St. Louis Rams' offense, which had averaged 31 points during the season, to 17 points, and the Patriots won on a last-second field goal by Adam Vinatieri. The win was the first Super Bowl championship in Patriots history.

The following season (2002)—the first in Gillette Stadium—the Patriots went 9–7 and missed the playoffs. New England finished with the same record as the New York Jets and the Miami Dolphins. Still, the Jets won the AFC East title as a result of the third tiebreaker (record among common opponents).

The Patriots' 2003 season started with a 31–0 loss to the Buffalo Bills in Week 1, a few days after they released team defensive captain Lawyer Milloy. However, they dominated through the remainder of the season to finish 14–2, setting a new franchise record for wins in a season. In the final week of the regular season, the Patriots avenged their loss to the Bills by the same 31–0 score. They defeated the Tennessee Titans in the divisional round of the playoffs. Playing against the Indianapolis Colts and Co-MVP Peyton Manning in the AFC Championship Game (Steve McNair of the Titans was also Co-MVP), the Patriots recorded four interceptions, and advanced to Super Bowl XXXVIII, where they defeated the Carolina Panthers 32–29 on a late Adam Vinatieri field goal. Belichick was awarded the NFL Coach of the Year Award.

In 2004, the Patriots once again finished with a 14–2 record, and they defeated the Indianapolis Colts in the divisional round of the playoffs. They opened the season at 6–0, which combined with the 15 straight wins to end the previous season, gave New England 21 consecutive victories to break the record for most wins in a row formerly held by the Miami Dolphins with 18 straight victories in the 1972 and 1973 seasons. They defeated the Pittsburgh Steelers in the AFC Championship Game. In Super Bowl XXXIX, the Patriots beat the Philadelphia Eagles and became only the second team to win three Super Bowls in four years. Belichick is the only coach to accomplish the feat as the Dallas Cowboys had two head coaches in the stretch they won three of four from 1992 to 1995.

==== Perfect regular season and Brady's injury: 2005–2009 ====
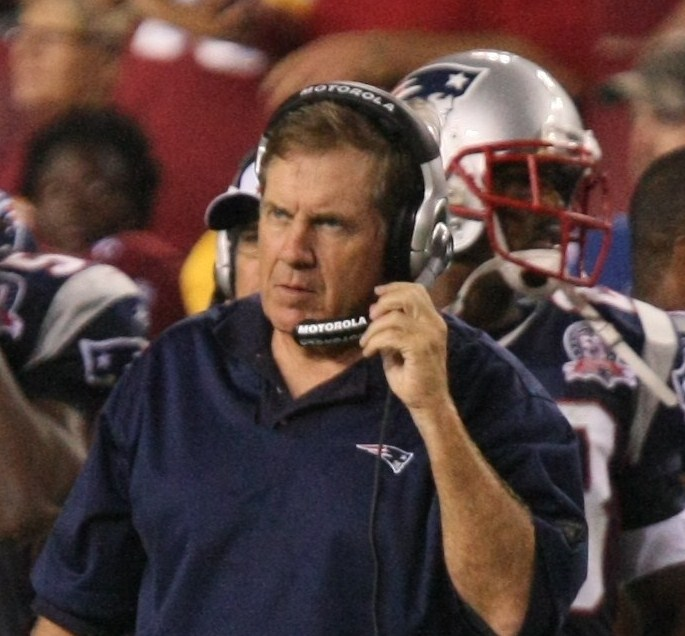
Belichick during preseason game against the Washington Redskins in August 2009

With a new defensive coordinator in Eric Mangini and no named offensive coordinator, the Patriots went 10–6 in the 2005 season and defeated the Jacksonville Jaguars in the Wild Card Round before losing to the Denver Broncos in the Divisional Round. Earlier, with a season-opening win over the Oakland Raiders, Belichick notched his 54th win with the Patriots, passing Mike Holovak as the winningest coach in Patriots history.

The Patriots finished with a 12–4 record in the 2006 season and defeated the New York Jets by a score of 37–16 in the Wild Card Round. They then beat the San Diego Chargers the next week in the Divisional Round, before losing to the eventual Super Bowl XLI champion Indianapolis Colts in the AFC Championship by a score of 38–34. The Patriots led 21–3 midway through the second quarter, but the Colts mounted one of the great comebacks in playoff history.

In 2007, Belichick led the Patriots to the first perfect regular season since the introduction of the 16-game regular-season schedule in 1978, only the fourth team to do so in National Football League history after the 1934 and 1942 Chicago Bears and 1972 Miami Dolphins. In the Divisional Round of the playoffs, they defeated the Jacksonville Jaguars by a score of 31–20. In the AFC Championship, the Patriots defeated the San Diego Chargers by a score of 21–12. The Patriots were upset in Super Bowl XLII 17–14 by the New York Giants, his former team, due to the defense allowing a famous play to David Tyree near the end of regulation. The Patriots' failure to attain a "perfect season" (undefeated and untied, including playoffs) preserved the Miami Dolphins as the sole team to do so, having finished their 1972 regular season at 14–0 and having won three games in the playoffs. Only two other teams in professional football have recorded a perfect season—the 1948 Cleveland Browns (14–0) of the then All-America Football Conference and the 1948 Calgary Stampeders (12–0) of the Canadian Football League. No team in the former American Football League ever had a perfect season.

During the Patriots' 2008 season-opener against the Kansas City Chiefs, quarterback Tom Brady sustained a season-ending injury in the first quarter. Backup quarterback Matt Cassel was named the starter for the remainder of the season. However, with a win in Week 2, the Patriots broke their own record for regular-season wins in a row with 21 (2006–08). After losing over 12 players to the injured reserve list, including Rodney Harrison, Adalius Thomas, and Laurence Maroney, the Patriots still managed their league-leading eighth consecutive season with a winning record, going 11–5. However, the Patriots, who finished second in the AFC East, missed the playoffs for the first time since 2002, losing on tiebreakers to the Miami Dolphins (who won the division on the fourth tiebreaker, better conference record) and the Baltimore Ravens (who beat out the Patriots for the last playoff spot due to a better conference record). The 1985 Denver Broncos are the only other 11-win team to miss the playoffs in a 16-game season.

In 2009, with a fully healthy Tom Brady back as the starting quarterback, Belichick was able to guide the Patriots to yet another AFC East division title with a 10–6 record. However, the Patriots lost to the Baltimore Ravens in the Wild Card Round.

==== Spygate ====
In an incident dubbed "Spygate", on September 9, 2007, NFL security caught a Patriots video assistant taping the New York Jets' defensive signals from the sidelines, which is not an approved location. The NFL rules state: "No video recording devices of any kind are permitted to be in use in the coaches' booth, on the field, or in the locker room during the game." Jets coach Eric Mangini, a former Patriots assistant, tipped off league officials that the Patriots might have been filming their signals. After the game, the Jets formally complained to the league.

On September 13, the NFL fined Belichick $500,000—the largest fine ever imposed on a coach in the league's 87-year history, and fined the Patriots $250,000. Additionally, the Patriots forfeited their first-round draft pick in the 2008 NFL draft. NFL Commissioner Roger Goodell, a former employee of the Jets, said that he fined the Patriots as a team because Belichick exercises so much control over the Patriots' on-field operations that "his actions and decisions are properly attributed to the club." Goodell considered suspending Belichick but decided that taking away draft picks would be more severe in the long run. Gary Myers, a columnist for New York's Daily News, stated Belichick should have been suspended by Goodell for the Patriots' next game against the Jets.

Belichick later issued the following statement:

I accept full responsibility for the actions that led to tonight's ruling. Once again, I apologize to the Kraft family and every person directly or indirectly associated with the New England Patriots for the embarrassment, distraction, and penalty my mistake caused. I also apologize to Patriots fans and would like to thank them for their support during the past few days and throughout my career. [...] As the Commissioner acknowledged, our use of sideline video had no impact on the outcome of last week's game. We have never used sideline video to obtain a competitive advantage while the game was in progress. [...] Part of my job as head coach is to ensure that our football operations are conducted in compliance of the league rules and all accepted interpretations of them. My interpretation of a rule in the Constitution and Bylaws was incorrect. [...] With tonight's resolution, I will not be offering any further comments on this matter. We are moving on with our preparations for Sunday's game.

The sanctions against Belichick were the harshest imposed on a head coach in league history until the New Orleans Saints' Sean Payton was suspended for the entire 2012 season for covering up a scheme in which bounties were paid for deliberately knocking opponents out of games.

Following the incident and its fallout, Belichick led the Patriots to a perfect 16–0 regular-season record, and was awarded the 2007 NFL Coach of the Year Award, as voted on by the Associated Press.

==== Making five Super Bowls and winning three, Gronkowski, and "We're on to Cincinnati": 2010–2019 ====
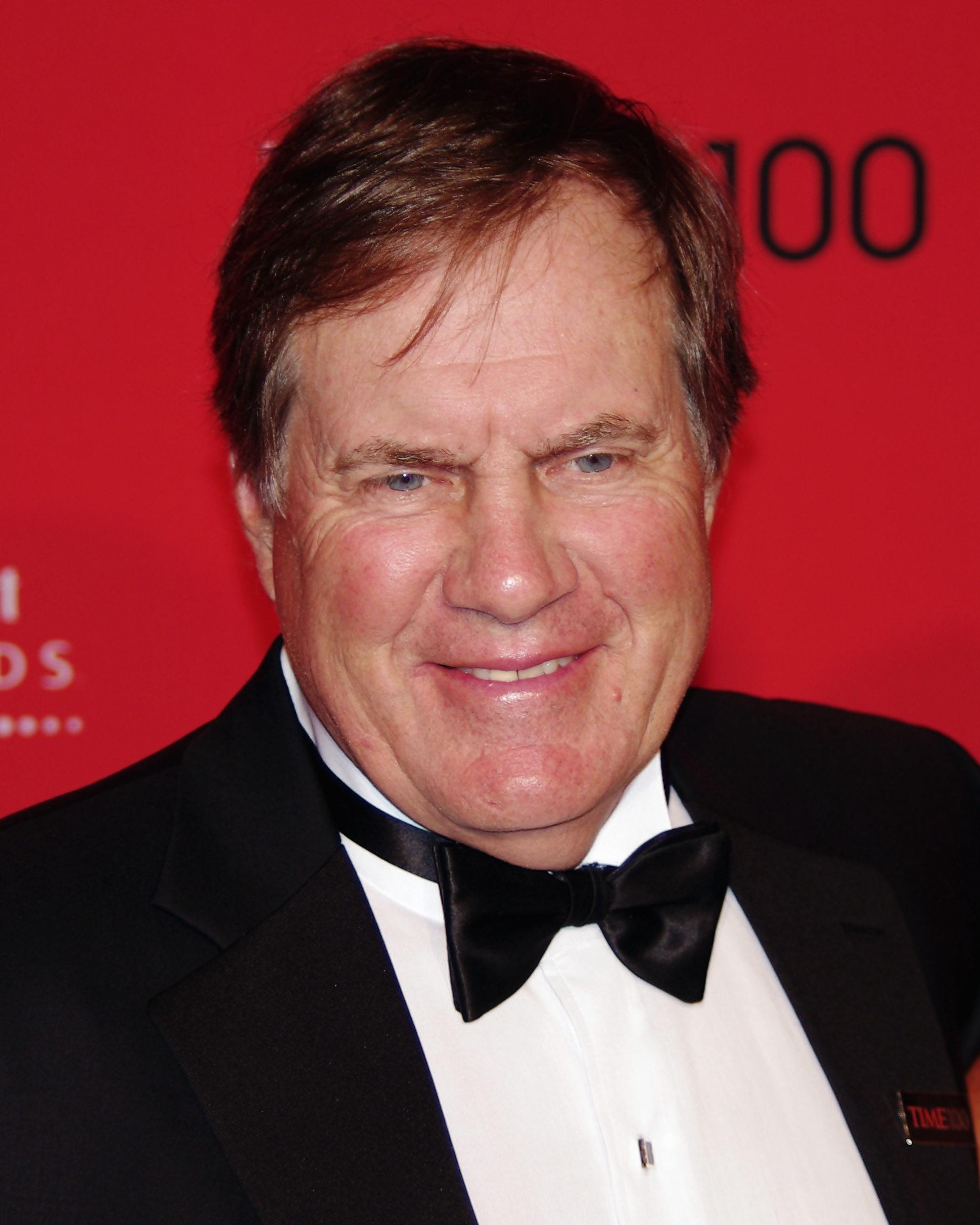
Belichick at the 2012 Time 100 gala

In the 2010 season, Belichick and the Patriots finished with a 14–2 record for the top seed in the AFC. However, their postseason ended quickly with a 28–21 loss to the New York Jets in the divisional round.

In the 2011 season, the Patriots topped the AFC with a 13–3 record. Following a victory over the Denver Broncos in the divisional round of the playoffs, the Patriots won the AFC Championship game, beating the Baltimore Ravens 23–20 when the Ravens failed to score a touchdown and Baltimore's kicker, Billy Cundiff, missed a routine 32-yard field goal attempt to tie the game and send it into overtime. This sent New England to their fifth Super Bowl under Belichick. In Super Bowl XLVI, the Patriots lost in the Super Bowl XLII rematch to the New York Giants by a score of 21–17.

On September 26, 2012, following a 31–30 loss to the Baltimore Ravens, Belichick was fined $50,000 for grabbing a replacement official's arm while asking for more specific clarity on a ruling after Baltimore had narrowly converted a last-second field goal attempt to secure the win. The Patriots finished the 2012 regular season with a 12–4 record. In the divisional round of the playoffs, they defeated the Houston Texans by a score of 41–28 and made it to the AFC Championship Game, where they lost to the eventual Super Bowl XLVII champion Baltimore Ravens by a score of 28–13, ending their season.

The Patriots began the 2013 season with much upheaval on the offensive side of the ball with the injury of Rob Gronkowski, the arrest and subsequent release of Aaron Hernandez, the departures of Wes Welker to the Denver Broncos and Danny Woodhead to the San Diego Chargers in free agency, and the release of Brandon Lloyd. To replace them, the Patriots signed Danny Amendola in free agency, drafted rookies Aaron Dobson and Josh Boyce, and signed undrafted rookie free agent Kenbrell Thompkins. The team finished the season with a 12–4 record, winning the AFC East and securing a playoff berth and a first-round bye, seeding second in the AFC standings. In the Divisional Round, they defeated the Indianapolis Colts by a score of 43–22. They lost to the Denver Broncos in the AFC Championship Game by a score of 26–16.

In the 2014 season, Belichick's Patriots started 2–2. At a mid-week press conference following a 41–14 loss to the Kansas City Chiefs, Belichick famously uttered, "We're on to Cincinnati" (referring to the Patriots' next opponent), several times in response to follow-up questions and criticisms of his team, Brady in particular. Ultimately, they recorded a 12–4 record for the third straight season. In the Divisional Round, they defeated the Baltimore Ravens by a score of 35–31. In the AFC Championship Game, which later gave rise to the Deflategate controversy, they defeated the Indianapolis Colts by a score of 45–7. They reached Super Bowl XLIX, where they defeated the Seattle Seahawks by a score of 28–24. With his fourth championship as head coach, Belichick tied Chuck Noll for most Super Bowl wins by a head coach.

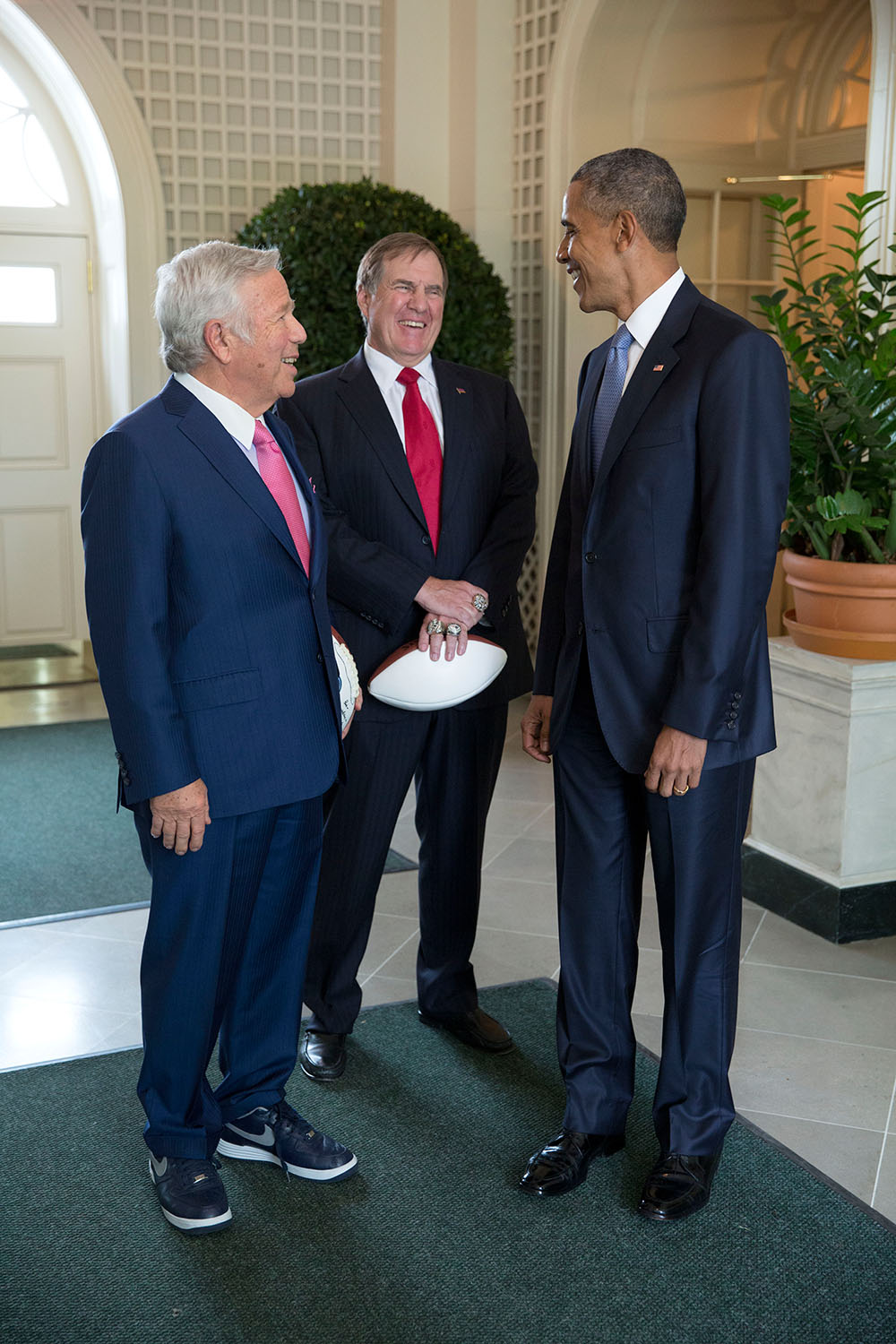
Belichick wearing an Armenian flag pin at the White House with President Barack Obama and Patriots' owner Robert Kraft in April 2015

In the 2015 season, the Patriots recorded a 12–4 record for the fourth straight season. They defeated the Kansas City Chiefs in the Divisional Round by a score of 27–20. During the AFC Championship Game, the Patriots narrowly lost to the eventual Super Bowl 50 champion Denver Broncos by a score of 20–18.

In the 2016 season, the Patriots recorded a 14–2 record, which earned them the #1 seed for the AFC playoffs. In the Divisional Round, they defeated the Houston Texans by a score of 34–16. During the AFC Championship Game, they defeated the Pittsburgh Steelers by a score of 36–17. They reached Super Bowl LI, where they defeated the Atlanta Falcons in a comeback victory by a score of 34–28 in overtime. The Patriots were down 28–3 at one point in the third quarter. With the victory, Belichick won his record fifth Super Bowl title as a head coach.

In the 2017 season, the Patriots went 13–3, setting an NFL record eighth consecutive 12-or-more-win seasons, capturing their ninth consecutive AFC East title and their 15th of the last 17 seasons. They defeated the Tennessee Titans in the Divisional Round by a score of 35–14 and the Jacksonville Jaguars in the AFC Championship Game by a score of 24–20, claiming their second consecutive AFC title, while also extending their record of consecutive AFC Championship Game appearances with seven. Super Bowl LII was Belichick's eighth title game as head coach and his eleventh overall in any capacity, which was also the Patriots' tenth appearance, all extending NFL records. The Ringer wrote that Belichick's "team is different from many of New England's famous teams from the previous decade: The first iteration of the Patriots dynasty relied on defense. This year, they are 29th in yards allowed (though fifth in points allowed) and instead have perfected the art of situational football." The latter Patriots teams were noted for mounting late comebacks in playoff games. However, the Patriots fell to the Philadelphia Eagles in Super Bowl LII, 41–33, as Eagles quarterback Nick Foles repeated his dominant NFC Championship Game performance and led Philadelphia to victory in a high-scoring game. The Patriots were down early, as they had been in most of their Super Bowl wins. However, they could not make a comeback this time, although they came very close. Eagles defensive end Brandon Graham strip-sacked Tom Brady to get the ball back with about two minutes to go in the fourth quarter. The Patriots did get the ball again before the end of the game, but they ran out of time to score.

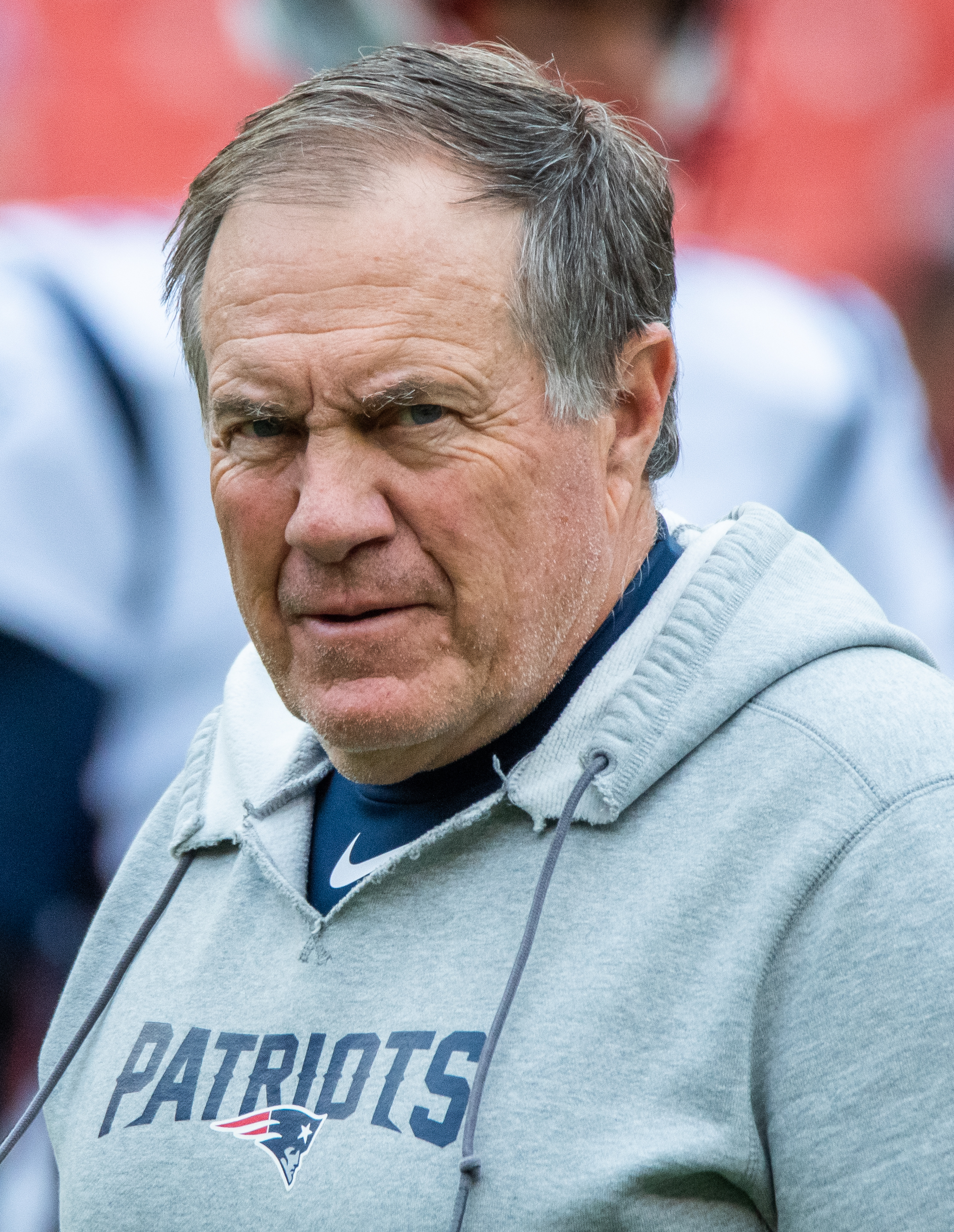
Belichick in 2019

In the 2018 season, the Patriots went 11–5, failing to win 12 or more games for the first time since 2009. Despite this, they still captured their 10th consecutive AFC East title and their 16th of the last 18 years. They defeated the Los Angeles Chargers in the Divisional Round by a score of 41–28 and the Kansas City Chiefs during the AFC Championship Game 37–31 in a challenging overtime game in Kansas City to advance to their third straight Super Bowl. In Super Bowl LIII, the Patriots defeated the Los Angeles Rams 13–3 to give Belichick his sixth Super Bowl championship as a head coach and his eighth overall to have the most Super Bowl rings in NFL history. His six championships matched both George Halas and Curly Lambeau for most championships as a head coach. The Patriots' defense held the high-scoring Rams offense to only 260 total yards.

On May 13, 2019, Belichick announced that he would assume another role as the Patriots' defensive play-caller starting the 2019 season to replace Brian Flores, who had left to become head coach of the Miami Dolphins. Flores' position as defensive coordinator would be left unfilled throughout the season. On October 27, 2019, with the Patriots' win over the Cleveland Browns, Belichick obtained his 300th win, regular and postseason combined, as a head coach. The Patriots finished the 2019 regular season with a 12–4 record, winning their 11th consecutive AFC East title. However, the Patriots were defeated in the Wild Card Round of the playoffs by the Tennessee Titans, led by former Patriots linebacker Mike Vrabel, by a score of 20–13.

==== Post-Brady era and final years in New England: 2020–2023 ====
Following the departure of Tom Brady to the Tampa Bay Buccaneers, Belichick and the Patriots were faced with an uncertain quarterback situation for the first time in nearly two decades. During the offseason, the Patriots signed former Carolina Panthers starter Cam Newton for the 2020 NFL season. The off-season routines and schedules, as well as the normal processes of regular season were severely disrupted by the worldwide COVID-19 pandemic. Despite the unanticipated difficulties and challenges of the pandemic, the Patriots were in the hunt for a playoff spot until late in the season, ultimately finishing 7–9. The 2020 season was Belichick's first losing season since his first year in New England.

In the 2021 NFL draft, the Patriots selected quarterback Mac Jones with the 15th overall pick. After Jones and Newton competed for the starting job during the preseason, Belichick made the decision to release Newton and name Jones the starter for the upcoming season. During Week 4, Brady's Tampa Bay Buccaneers visited the Patriots in his first trip to Gillette Stadium since signing with the Buccaneers. A missed 56-yard field goal by Patriots kicker Nick Folk allowed Tampa Bay to narrowly escape with a 19–17 victory. Immediately after the game, Brady and Belichick shared a quick embrace on the field before Brady greeted his former teammates and other members of the Patriots organization. Though fans criticized Belichick for his lack of warmth displayed towards his former quarterback, the two privately spoke at length in the Buccaneers locker room following the match. Belichick helped lead the Patriots to a 10–7 record in 2021. The team fell to the Buffalo Bills in the Wild Card Round by a score of 47–17.

Before the 2022 season began, Belichick would not name an offensive coordinator to replace the outgoing Josh McDaniels, who had left to coach the Las Vegas Raiders. This left both the offensive and defensive coordinator positions vacant throughout the season. Despite starting quarterback Mac Jones being injured in Week 3 and subsequently missing three more weeks, the Patriots remained in the hunt for a playoff spot until the last week, finishing with a record of 8–9. Jones would go through a noticeable regression throughout the year, and many pundits criticized the return of Joe Judge and Matt Patricia to the Patriots staff and cited their lack of coaching acumen as the reason for Jones' decline.

As the 2023 season began, Belichick was 19 wins behind Don Shula on the NFL's all-time wins list. He and Kraft agreed to designate inside linebackers coach Jerod Mayo, who played for New England from 2008 to 2015, as head coach in waiting. Initial plans called for Mayo to take over as head coach in 2025, giving Belichick ample time to pass Shula while grooming Mayo to succeed him. However, the season quickly came unraveled. In Week 4, the Patriots lost to the Dallas Cowboys by a score of 38–3. In doing so, Belichick suffered the worst loss of his coaching career (35 points). The following week, the Patriots lost to the Saints by a score of 34–0, giving Belichick his worst home loss of his career. Two weeks later, New England upset the Buffalo Bills 29–25 to earn Belichick his 300th career regular-season win as an NFL head coach. After a 10–6 loss to the Indianapolis Colts in Germany and subsequent bye week, Belichick named Bailey Zappe the team's starting quarterback. In the final game of the season, the Patriots lost to the New York Jets 17–3, snapping the team's 15-game winning streak over the Jets. The Patriots finished the season with a 4–13 record, the team's worst in Belichick's 24 seasons as head coach.

During the season, Belichick became increasingly withdrawn, and stopped speaking to all but a few of his assistants. Among those he cut off was Mayo. Relations with Kraft chilled dramatically as it became apparent that the season was all but finished. On January 11, 2024, Belichick and the Patriots mutually agreed to part ways. Mayo was named his successor.

==== Overall record in New England ====
Under Belichick, the Patriots had a regular-season record of 266–121–0 over 24 seasons. Belichick is the most successful coach in Patriots history; his 266 wins with the franchise are more than quadruple those of runner-up Mike Holovak. Belichick also compiled a 30–12 record in the playoffs with New England, including a 6–3 record in Super Bowls. He led the Patriots to 17 divisional titles, including five consecutive titles from 2003 to 2007 and eleven consecutive titles from 2009 to 2019. This streak of 11 consecutive playoff appearances is the most in NFL history for any team.

=== Attempted NFL return ===
After leaving the Patriots organization, Belichick immediately sought another head coaching job in the NFL and felt confident in his chances due to the strength of his resume. However, teams did not feel comfortable granting Belichick the same amount of power he previously received in New England. Most teams had moved away from having one man serve as coach and (de facto) general manager, as Belichick had done with the Patriots. Instead, they valued collaboration across all football operations. Belichick's 29–39 record after Brady left New England was called into question, along with his rosters full of underperforming talent due to years of subpar draft picks and personnel decisions. Others also doubted the 71-year-old Belichick's long-term viability with their organizations, believing he would leave after gaining the 15 more wins he needed to surpass Don Shula as the NFL's winningest head coach, which would subsequently force the team to start another coaching search.

Of the seven other NFL organizations in need of a head coach during the 2024 offseason, only the Atlanta Falcons considered Belichick for the position. The Falcons would interview Belichick twice, and despite the coach's pledge to coexist with team executives, the organization ultimately chose to hire Raheem Morris as their head coach, surprising fans, the media, and Belichick himself. San Francisco 49ers head coach Kyle Shanahan offered Belichick an opportunity to join his team's coaching staff as defensive coordinator, but Belichick declined the position.

The 2024 season saw Belichick out of the NFL for the first time in 49 years, and he subsequently began looking for work on television and in the media. Many believed that Belichick would attempt to find another NFL head coaching job in the next offseason hiring cycle, and during the season Belichick would meet weekly with his former assistants such as McDaniels and Patricia to discuss league trends and schematic shifts out of anticipation of returning to the league. However, Belichick again attracted little interest from NFL teams with head coaching vacancies towards the end of the season.

=== North Carolina Tar Heels (2025–present) ===
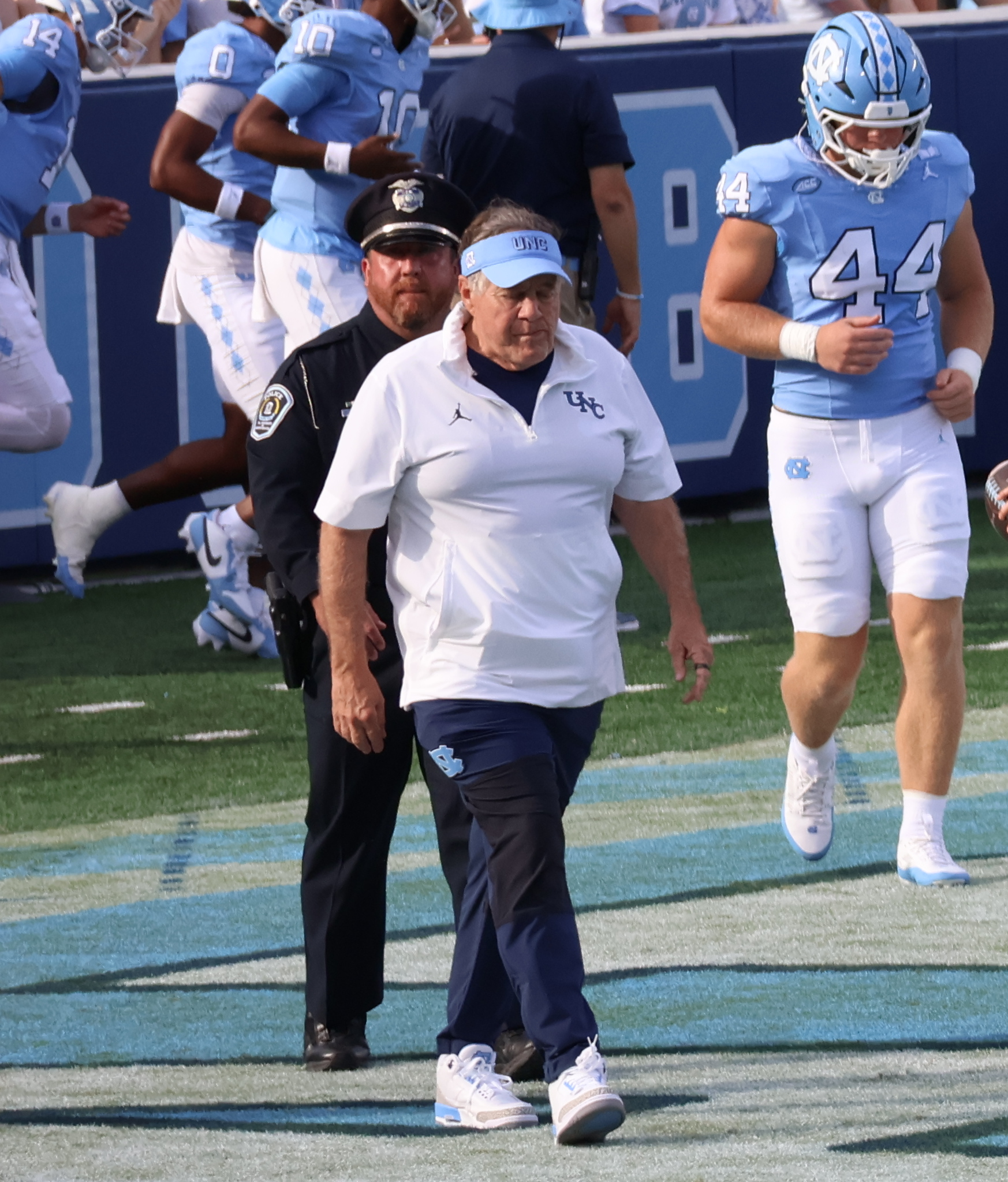
Belichick with North Carolina in 2025

On December 11, 2024, Belichick was named the 35th head football coach of the North Carolina Tar Heels football team. This would be Belichick's first time coaching at the collegiate level. He would employ a staff with deep NFL experience, along with both of his sons Brian and Stephen Belichick as assistant coaches. During an introductory press conference, new general manager Mike Lombardi said that he and Belichick considered the program to be the "33rd NFL team", stating that they intended on building a pro team and that everyone involved with the program had some form or aspect of experience in professional football. Belichick was reported to earn $10 million annually, with the first three years guaranteed, and $3.5 million in annual incentives. Belichick would also refuse to allow scouts from the New England Patriots on campus due to his acrimonious end with the franchise.

Belichick began the 2025 season by losing his collegiate coaching debut 48–14 against TCU, allowing both the most points by an opposing team ever in Belichick's career as head coach and the most by North Carolina in a season opener in its history. He would have his first win with the program the next week away against Charlotte, winning by a score of 20–3, and his first home win a week after that against Richmond by a score of 41–6. However, North Carolina would lose their next four games before getting their first ACC conference win against Syracuse by a score of 27–10. The next week, Belichick would lead UNC to a second consecutive ACC win against Stanford with a score of 20–15. However, this was followed with a losing streak against all three in-state rivals Wake Forest, Duke and NC State, ending Belichick's debut UNC season with a 4–8 record and the program failing to qualify for a bowl game for the first time since 2018.

The 2026 season for Belichick's Tar Heels began under turmoil, as the school began an internal investigation for their football program. Lombardi and Steve Belichick would resign from their positions as a result of this investigation. Despite this, the Tar Heels began the season 2–0, including winning their season opener against TCU in Ireland.

== Media career ==
Belichick had a cameo appearance in an episode of the Denis Leary drama Rescue Me as a mourner at a funeral, alongside former Boston Bruin Phil Esposito.

In September 2011, a two-hour documentary following Belichick through the entire 2009 season was aired as the first two episodes of the NFL Network documentary series A Football Life. According to NFL Network, the premiere was the most-watched documentary in the history of the NFL Network, and the second-most watched broadcast in the Boston media market, beating all the broadcast networks, and finishing second only to a Boston Red Sox game.

Episode 96 of ESPN's 30 for 30 series is entitled "The Two Bills", and covers the history between Belichick and Bill Parcells.

While still serving as head coach for the Patriots in 2019, Belichick appeared as one of three main analysts, alongside host Rich Eisen and Cris Collinsworth, for the NFL 100 All-Time Team series on NFL Network, serving as a voter, in addition to providing his analysis of each member's significance and breaking down tape of highlight plays. Belichick was chosen in these roles due to his exceptional knowledge of American football, to the extent that he and fellow former head coach John Madden were specifically assigned to look over film of the earliest players selected to the team. Belichick was awarded a Sports Emmy in 2021 for his contributions to the series.

Peyton Manning revealed in 2022 that Belichick would join the Manning brothers (Peyton and Eli) in ESPN's Manningcast, an alternate live television broadcast of Monday Night Football.

After leaving the Patriots in 2024, Belichick, while still declaring himself an active head coach, officially agreed to appear every Monday afternoon during the 2024 NFL season with ESPN's The Pat McAfee Show, first appearing as an analyst on the show during its "5th Annual Draft Spectacular", covering the 2024 NFL draft, following a guest appearance weeks prior.

In 2024, Belichick appeared as surprise guest participant on the Netflix special The Roast of Tom Brady, appearing alongside many former Patriots alumni. In March of the same year, Belichick, Brady and owner Robert Kraft's 20-year journey was examined in the Apple TV+ 10-part documentary series The Dynasty: New England Patriots, whose aim was to "reveal the cost of greatness."

== Pro Football Hall of Fame candidacy ==
Through the latter half of his career with the Patriots, Belichick was considered a candidate for future induction to the Pro Football Hall of Fame. On January 27, 2026, it was reported that Belichick had not been elected to the Hall of Fame on the first ballot, failing to reach the requisite 40 of 50 votes from a panel consisting of media members and members of the Hall of Fame. The exclusion of Belichick led members of the media, current and former players, and members of the Hall of Fame to react with shock, disbelief, and anger, with many of them considering it a snub. Tom Brady and Robert Kraft, who worked with Belichick throughout the Patriots' period of success, both expressed disappointment at the decision. President Donald Trump called Belichick's exclusion "ridiculous."

It was reported that Belichick's candidacy was harmed by Hall of Fame member and longtime Indianapolis Colts executive Bill Polian, who was one of the voters and who felt that Belichick should "wait a year" before induction due to Belichick's alleged role in the Spygate and Deflategate controversies, and shared that opinion with his fellow voters. Polian denied lobbying voters against Belichick's candidacy, and initially claimed to have voted for Belichick, before later saying that he could not recall "with 100% certainty" that he voted for Belichick. On January 29, the Pro Football Hall of Fame stated that Polian had in fact voted for Belichick, and that Polian did not speak during a discussion surrounding Belichick's candidacy.

Belichick's failure to be inducted on the first ballot led to some media members calling for a reform of the Hall of Fame voting process.

== Head coaching record ==
=== NFL ===
Team	Year	Regular season					Postseason			
Team	Year	Won	Lost	Ties	Win %	Finish	Won	Lost	Win %	Result
CLE	1991	6	10	0	.375	3rd in AFC Central	—	—	—	—
CLE	1992	7	9	0	.438	3rd in AFC Central	—	—	—	—
CLE	1993	7	9	0	.438	3rd in AFC Central	—	—	—	—
CLE	1994	11	5	0	.688	2nd in AFC Central	1	1	.500	Lost to Pittsburgh Steelers in AFC Divisional Game
CLE	1995	5	11	0	.313	4th in AFC Central	—	—	—	—
CLE total		36	44	0	.450		1	1	.500	
NE	2000	5	11	0	.313	5th in AFC East	—	—	—	—
NE	2001	11	5	0	.688	1st in AFC East	3	0	1.000	Super Bowl XXXVI champions
NE	2002	9	7	0	.563	2nd in AFC East	—	—	—	—
NE	2003	14	2	0	.875	1st in AFC East	3	0	1.000	Super Bowl XXXVIII champions
NE	2004	14	2	0	.875	1st in AFC East	3	0	1.000	Super Bowl XXXIX champions
NE	2005	10	6	0	.625	1st in AFC East	1	1	.500	Lost to Denver Broncos in AFC Divisional Game
NE	2006	12	4	0	.750	1st in AFC East	2	1	.667	Lost to Indianapolis Colts in AFC Championship Game
NE	2007	16	0	0	1.000	1st in AFC East	2	1	.667	Lost to New York Giants in Super Bowl XLII
NE	2008	11	5	0	.688	2nd in AFC East	—	—	—	—
NE	2009	10	6	0	.625	1st in AFC East	0	1	.000	Lost to Baltimore Ravens in AFC Wild Card Game
NE	2010	14	2	0	.875	1st in AFC East	0	1	.000	Lost to New York Jets in AFC Divisional Game
NE	2011	13	3	0	.813	1st in AFC East	2	1	.667	Lost to New York Giants in Super Bowl XLVI
NE	2012	12	4	0	.750	1st in AFC East	1	1	.500	Lost to Baltimore Ravens in AFC Championship Game
NE	2013	12	4	0	.750	1st in AFC East	1	1	.500	Lost to Denver Broncos in AFC Championship Game
NE	2014	12	4	0	.750	1st in AFC East	3	0	1.000	Super Bowl XLIX champions
NE	2015	12	4	0	.750	1st in AFC East	1	1	.500	Lost to Denver Broncos in AFC Championship Game
NE	2016	14	2	0	.875	1st in AFC East	3	0	1.000	Super Bowl LI champions
NE	2017	13	3	0	.813	1st in AFC East	2	1	.667	Lost to Philadelphia Eagles in Super Bowl LII
NE	2018	11	5	0	.688	1st in AFC East	3	0	1.000	Super Bowl LIII champions
NE	2019	12	4	0	.750	1st in AFC East	0	1	.000	Lost to Tennessee Titans in AFC Wild Card Game
NE	2020	7	9	0	.438	3rd in AFC East	—	—	—	—
NE	2021	10	7	0	.588	2nd in AFC East	0	1	.000	Lost to Buffalo Bills in AFC Wild Card Game
NE	2022	8	9	0	.471	3rd in AFC East	—	—	—	—
NE	2023	4	13	0	.235	4th in AFC East	—	—	—	—
NE total		266	121	0	.687		30	12	.714	
Total		302	165	0	.647		31	13	.705	

=== College ===
Year	Team	Overall	Conference	Standing	Bowl/playoffs
North Carolina Tar Heels (Atlantic Coast Conference) (2025–present)
2025	North Carolina	4–8	2–6	T–13th	
2026	North Carolina	5–6	2–5		
North Carolina:		9–14	4–11		
Total:		9–14			

== Coaching tree ==
Bill Belichick has worked under six head coaches:

- Ted Marchibroda, Baltimore Colts (1975)
- Rick Forzano, Detroit Lions (1976)
- Tommy Hudspeth, Detroit Lions (1976–1977)
- Red Miller, Denver Broncos (1978)
- Ray Perkins, New York Giants (1979–1982)
- Bill Parcells, New York Giants (1983–1990), New England Patriots (1996), New York Jets (1997–1999)

Twenty of Belichick's assistant coaches have become NFL or NCAA head coaches (not including interim tenures):

- Rod Dowhower, Vanderbilt (1995–1996)
- Nick Saban, Michigan State (1995–1999), LSU (2001–2004), Miami Dolphins (2005–2006), Alabama (2007–2023)
- Pat Hill, Fresno State (1997–2011)
- Woody Widenhofer, Vanderbilt (1997–2001)
- Kirk Ferentz, Iowa (1999–present)
- Al Groh, New York Jets (2000), Virginia (2001–2009)
- Romeo Crennel, Cleveland Browns (2005–2008), Kansas City Chiefs (2011–2012)
- Charlie Weis, Notre Dame (2005–2009), Kansas (2012–2014)
- Eric Mangini, New York Jets (2006–2008), Cleveland Browns (2009–2010)
- Josh McDaniels, Denver Broncos (2009–2010), Las Vegas Raiders (2022–2023)
- Jim Schwartz, Detroit Lions (2009–2013)
- DeWayne Walker, New Mexico State (2009–2013)
- Pete Mangurian, Columbia (2012–2014)
- Bill O'Brien, Penn State (2012–2013), Houston Texans (2014–2020), Boston College (2024–present)
- Matt Patricia, Detroit Lions (2018–2020)
- Brian Flores, Miami Dolphins (2019–2021)
- Joe Judge, New York Giants, (2020–2021)
- Bret Bielema, Illinois (2021–present)
- Jedd Fisch, Arizona (2021–2023), Washington (2024–present)
- Brian Daboll, New York Giants (2022–2025)
- Jerod Mayo, New England Patriots (2024)

Three of Belichick's players have become NFL or NCAA head coaches

- Kliff Kingsbury, Texas Tech (2013–2018), Arizona Cardinals (2019–2022)
- Jerod Mayo, New England Patriots (2024)
- Mike Vrabel, Tennessee Titans (2018–2023), New England Patriots (2025–present)

During the offseason, Belichick visits other football programs to learn from their experiences. For example, he has studied the Navy run offense, sought Bill Walsh (in past years) to understand more about the San Francisco 49ers as an organization and the West Coast offense as a system, and spent time with Jimmy Johnson to learn about drafting. Belichick also learned about defensive backs from Bill Cowher and wanted to hire Cowher as an assistant, though Cowher opted to stay loyal to Marty Schottenheimer.

The track record of Belichick's coaching tree has been characterized as poor. Former assistant coaches under Belichick had a combined 208–296–1 (.413) record as head coaches of their own teams through November 28, 2020, and a number of them ended their brief tenures as head coaches by being fired midseason. As of the end of the 2020 season, the only members of this coaching tree to have career NFL head coaching records above .500 were former coaches Groh (9–7) and O'Brien (52–48 during season, 2–4 in playoffs).

== Personal life ==
Nick Saban and Belichick are good friends. In 2007, when Belichick spoke about their relationship, he said: "Two successful Croats in the same division of NFL. You must admit, you don't see that every day." (At the time, Saban was the head coach of the NFL's Miami Dolphins, who play in the same division as the New England Patriots.) In May 2018, President Donald Trump appointed Belichick to be a member of his Council on Sports, Fitness & Nutrition.

Belichick has an Alaskan Klee Kai dog named Nike. Interest in the breed surged after Nike made an appearance on camera during the 2020 NFL draft.

Belichick has dual Croatian/American citizenship. He received Croatian citizenship on June 3, 2024, in Banski dvori in Zagreb from the Croatian prime minister Andrej Plenković. He was also special guest of the association football friendly match on Stadion Rujevica between Croatia and North Macedonia.

In August 2025, Belichick and his partner Jordon Hudson submitted 17 trademark applications through their company, TCE Rights Management. Among these are phrases linked to Belichick, such as "Chapel Bill," "Belestrator," "The Belichick Way," "Trail of Salty Tears," "Gold Digger," and "No Days Off."

=== Family and relationships ===
Belichick married Debby Clarke Belichick in 1977. They divorced in 2006. They have three children. Their daughter Amanda played lacrosse at Wesleyan University, and as of 2025 has been the head women's lacrosse coach at the College of the Holy Cross in Massachusetts since July 2015. Their son Stephen played lacrosse and football at Rutgers University, served as an assistant coach with the Patriots, and as of 2025 has been the defensive coordinator for the University of North Carolina. Their son Brian is also an assistant coach with the University of North Carolina.

Starting in 2007, Belichick was in a relationship with Linda Holliday, the executive director of the Bill Belichick Foundation. The relationship ended in 2023.

In June 2024, it was reported that Belichick was in a relationship with Jordon Hudson, a 24-year-old former Bridgewater State University cheerleader and 2024 Miss Maine USA pageant first runner-up. The two reportedly met on a flight in 2021 and have been dating since 2023.

=== Declined Presidential Medal of Freedom ===
On January 10, 2021, Politico reported then-president Donald Trump planned to award Belichick the Presidential Medal of Freedom. Belichick indicated that he was flattered to be considered for the honor, but declined the award in a statement issued the next day. His statement referenced the January 6 United States Capitol attack, which the House of Representatives had accused Trump of provoking when it impeached him for the second time of his presidency, and cited Belichick's "great reverence for our nation's values, freedom and democracy" in light of that event. A number of Massachusetts politicians, including Senator Ed Markey and Representative Jim McGovern, had previously called on him to decline after news of the award became public.

=== Politics ===
During the Patriots visit to the White House in 2015, Belichick wore an Armenian flag pin during the ceremony to raise awareness about the Armenian genocide, alongside his longtime assistant, Berj Najarian. Belichick later criticized then-president Barack Obama for not explicitly using the word genocide when describing the mass murder, despite Obama promising to do so during his campaign.

On November 9, 2016, it was revealed that Belichick wrote a letter supporting Donald Trump's presidential campaign just days before the 2016 election, although Belichick claimed the letter was about friendship, not politics.

In 2020, during the Second Nagorno-Karabakh War, Belichick expressed support for Armenia and urged the U.S. to take action in their defense. He published a video on Instagram, stating: "To Armenians around the world, I just want to give a quick message and let you know that I stand with you during these difficult times".

== In popular culture ==
- The Belichick Plaza at Wesleyan University (formerly Warren Street lobby) was dedicated in recognition of the leadership and generosity of Belichick.
- A Song of Ice and Fire author George R. R. Martin has mentioned Belichick and the Patriots in his interviews and in his work.
- In the Madden NFL video game series, his name is not used because he is not a member of the NFL Coaches Association, which licenses the game. Belichick is the only NFL head coach who has chosen not to join the association.
- Belichick is well known as a fan of the rock band Bon Jovi, who visited Patriots training camp on August 14, 2006, and in 2019. Their 2002 song "Bounce" is dedicated to Belichick.
- The 2008 South Park episode "Eek, a Penis!" deals with fallout from the 2007 National Football League videotaping controversy.
- In the Family Guy episode "3 Acts of God" it is revealed that God won't let the New England Patriots win games because Belichick never smiles.
- Belichick's "We're on to Cincinnati" press conference during the 2014 season is spoofed by comedian Frank Caliendo.
- A glowering Belichick is featured in the third episode of the twenty-eighth season of The Simpsons, entitled "The Town".
- In 2024, Belichick is reportedly planning on writing a football leadership guide modelled after Finding the Winning Edge (1998) written by Bill Walsh.
- In October 2017, Belichick was referenced in the rap group Migos' single "MotorSport" featuring Cardi B and Nicki Minaj. The song includes lyrics referencing his role in Deflategate.

== See also ==
- Brady–Belichick era – Sports dynasty of the New England Patriots
- List of NFL head coach wins leaders
- List of NFL head coaches by playoff record
- List of professional gridiron football coaches with 200 wins
- List of Super Bowl head coaches
