= Brian Belichick =

American football coach

Current position
- Title: Interim defensive coordinator, Defensive backs & safeties coach
- Team: North Carolina
- Conference: ACC

Biographical details
- Education: Trinity College

Coaching career (HC unless noted)
- 2017–2019: New England Patriots (CA)
- 2020–2024: New England Patriots (S)
- 2025–present: North Carolina (DB/S)

Administrative career (AD unless noted)
- 2016: New England Patriots (SA)

Accomplishments and honors

Championships
- 2× Super Bowl champion (LI, LIII)

Brian Belichick is an American football coach who is the interim defensive coordinator and safeties coach for the North Carolina Tar Heels. He was previously a defensive assistant with the New England Patriots of the National Football League (NFL) from 2017 to 2024 before joining North Carolina in 2025, serving under his father Bill with both.

== Early years ==
Belichick played lacrosse at The Rivers School and Suffield Academy where he was an All-League selection in football and lacrosse. He then played two years of collegiate lacrosse at Trinity College, graduating in 2016.

== Coaching career ==
=== New England Patriots ===
On July 21, 2016, the New England Patriots publicly confirmed that Brian Belichick had been hired as a scouting assistant, which was to be his first and only year working in the front office. He began assisting the coaching staff with film breakdowns during the team's Super Bowl LI winning playoff run before transitioning to a coaching assistant role the following season. Belichick served as a coaching assistant for three years (2017–2019) before being promoted to Safeties Coach, a position previously held by his elder brother Stephen until July 2020 when it was announced that the latter would be named Outside Linebackers Coach. During that stretch, he won his first Super Bowl title when the Patriots defeated the Los Angeles Rams in Super Bowl LIII. After the 2024 season, it was announced that Belichick was not retained for incoming head coach Mike Vrabel's staff for the 2025 season.

=== North Carolina ===
Brian Belichick joined the Tar Heel defensive staff as defensive backs/safeties coach in 2025.

== Personal life ==
Belichick is the son of former New England Patriots head coach and current North Carolina Tar Heels head coach Bill Belichick and grandson of Steve Belichick. His elder sister, Amanda Belichick, is a lacrosse coach currently serving as Head Coach of the women's program at Holy Cross. His elder brother, Stephen, was the Defensive coordinator for the University of North Carolina football team. On Saturday, June 26, 2021, Brian married Catherine "Callie" D. McLaughlin on Nantucket Island, Massachusetts at St. Mary's Church and had the reception at Sankaty Head Beach Club.
