= Stephen Belichick =

American football coach (born 1987)

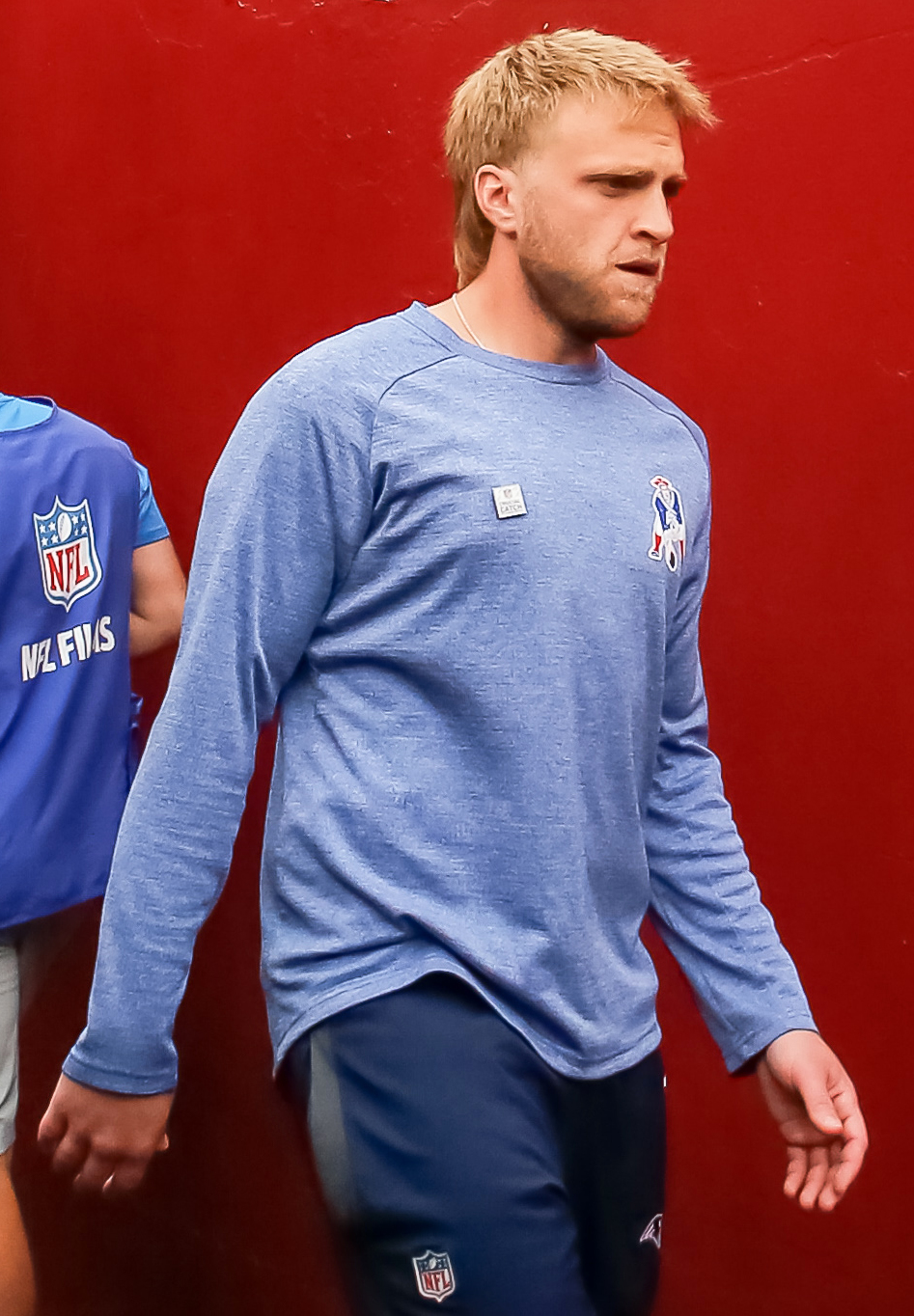
- Belichick in 2021

Biographical details
- Born: March 25, 1987 (age 39); Summit, New Jersey, U.S.

Playing career

Lacrosse
- 2008–2011: Rutgers

Football
- 2011: Rutgers
- Positions: Lacrosse: defenseman / long-stick midfielder Football: Long snapper

Coaching career (HC unless noted)
- 2012–2015: New England Patriots (Defensive assistant)
- 2016–2018: New England Patriots (S)
- 2019: New England Patriots (DB)
- 2020–2023: New England Patriots (OLB)
- 2024: Washington (DC/OLB)
- 2025–2026: North Carolina (DC)

Accomplishments and honors

Championships
- 3× Super Bowl champion (XLIX, LI, LIII)

Stephen C. Belichick (born March 25, 1987) is an American football coach who most recently served as the defensive coordinator for the North Carolina Tar Heels. The son of Bill Belichick, he began his career as a defensive assistant under his father for the New England Patriots of the National Football League (NFL) from 2012 to 2023. He rejoined his father with the Tar Heels in 2025 before announcing his resignation in 2026.

== Early years ==
Belichick played lacrosse at The Rivers School in Weston, Massachusetts, and was an All-League Honorable Mention selection in his senior year. He then attended Rutgers University where he continued to play lacrosse as a defenseman and long-stick midfielder (LSM) from 2008 through 2011. He also played for Rutgers Football under coach Greg Schiano in 2011 as a long snapper.

== Coaching career ==
=== New England Patriots ===
On May 10, 2012, Belichick was hired as a coaching assistant by the New England Patriots, where his father Bill was the head coach. He served in that position for four seasons before being named safeties coach prior to the start of the 2016 season. He won his first Super Bowl when the Patriots defeated the Seattle Seahawks in Super Bowl XLIX.

On February 5, 2017, Belichick was part of the Patriots coaching staff that won Super Bowl LI. In the game, the Patriots defeated the Atlanta Falcons by a score of 34–28 in overtime. He won his third Super Bowl title when the Patriots defeated the Los Angeles Rams in Super Bowl LIII. The Patriots held the Rams to three points in the lowest scoring Super Bowl ever.

For the 2019 season, after long-time assistant Brian Flores left to become the new head coach of the Miami Dolphins, Belichick assumed defensive play calling duties previously held by Flores while also operating as the team's secondary coach. On July 28, 2020, the Patriots moved Stephen from safeties to outside linebackers coach and promoted his brother Brian to safeties coach.

=== Washington ===
On February 6, 2024, Belichick was hired as the defensive coordinator of the Washington Huskies. On January 3, 2025, Belichick was succeeded by Ryan Walters as defensive coordinator at Washington.

=== North Carolina Tar Heels ===
On December 22, 2024, Belichick was hired as the defensive coordinator of the North Carolina Tar Heels, reuniting with his father who was head coach. In 2026, local NBC affiliate WRAL reported that University officials were investigating potential drug use by Belichick while at work, as well as him potentially providing drugs to players.

On September 17, 2026, Belichick resigned from his role as North Carolina defensive coordinator, taking effect on October 27, at the end of his medical leave.

== Personal life ==
Belichick is the son of NFL head coach Bill Belichick and the grandson of Steve Belichick. His younger brother, Brian Belichick, also works for the University of North Carolina at Chapel Hill, currently serving as the team's defensive back/safeties coach.
