= Manitoba Sports Hall of Fame and Museum =

Canadian organization established 1980

Coordinates: 49°53′27″N 97°9′0″W

- Established: 1980
- Location: Winnipeg, Manitoba, Canada
- Type: Sports Hall of Fame and Museum
- Website: www.halloffame.mb.ca/

The Manitoba Sports Hall of Fame and Museum is a Canadian museum in Winnipeg, Manitoba, dedicated to honoring the history and achievements of sports in Manitoba. The organization began in 1980, and then opened a museum in The Forks in 1993. After five years, the museum moved to The Bay store on Portage Avenue. Its present-day location is the Sport Manitoba building (145 Pacific Ave.), where it had its grand opening on October 27, 2012.

Exhibits of Manitoba's sports teams and honoured athletes are displayed in the museum.

The Hall of Fame inducts both individuals as well as teams.

== Individual members ==
Year	Member	Category	Sport
2022	Andrea "Ando" Ferguson	Athlete	Ringette
2004	Beatrice "Bea" (Hall) McKenzie	Athlete	Softball
1984	Vivian (King) Thompson	Athlete	Swimming
1996	Mary (Rutton) Robinson	Athlete	Multi-sport
2006	Joanne (Mucz) Vergara	Athlete	Swimming
1987	Janet (Maddin) Neale	Athlete	Athletics
1996	Isny (Johnson) Gallimore	Athlete	Multi-sport
1997	Merlene (Wach) Netterfield	Athlete	Golf
2010	Jo-Ann (Percy) Lindsay	Athlete	Golf
2001	Eileen Whalley Richards	Athlete	Speed skating
1984	Robina (Higgins) Haight	Athlete	Athletics
1989	Betty (Mitchell) Olson	Athlete	Speed skating
1992	Evelyn (Wawryshyn) Moroz	Athlete	Baseball
1995	Doreen (McCannell) Botterill	Athlete	Speed skating
1984	Mary Rose (Thacker) Temple	Athlete	Figure skating
1986	Elizabeth (Appleby) Levin	Athlete	Speed skating
1981	Howard Wood Sr.	Athlete	Curling
2004	Bill Heindl Sr.	Athlete	Multi-sport
1999	Ward Wood McVey	Athlete	Multi-sport
2007	Emile St. Godard	Athlete	Dog sledding
2007	Angela (Johnson) Straub	Athlete	Basketball
2011	Ronald G. Turnbull	Athlete / Builder	Cricket
1994	Robert "Bud" Tinsley	Athlete	Canadian football
1992	Robert "Bobby" Summers	Athlete	Horse racing
1997	Gordon Rowland	Athlete	Canadian football
1988	Steve Patrick	Athlete	Canadian football
2004	Ches McCance	Athlete	Canadian football
2004	James "Sugar Jim" Henry	Athlete	Hockey
1993	Tom Casey	Athlete	Canadian football
1994	Mark Berger	Athlete	Judo
1985	Gordon Hudson	Athlete	Curling
2012	Terry Ball	Athlete	Hockey
1993	Tom Johnson	Athlete	Hockey
1991	Martin Riley	Athlete	Basketball
2009	H. Sanford "Sandy" Riley	Athlete / Builder	Sailing
1997	Jack Stewart	Athlete	Hockey
1981	Frank Stack	Athlete	Speed skating
1981	Culver Riley	Builder	Multi-sport
1995	Herb Gray	Athlete	Canadian football
2004	Eddie James	Athlete	Canadian football
2011	Bob Cameron	Athlete	Canadian football
1989	Charlie Gardiner	Athlete	Hockey
2013	Harold Edward Joseph "Bullet Joe" Simpson	Athlete	Canadian football
1984	Ab Gowanlock	Athlete	Curling
1996	Ab McDonald	Athlete	Hockey
1995	Al Miller	Builder	Multi-sport
1996	Al Sparks	Athlete	Boxing
1992	Albert Atamanchuk	Builder	Weightlifting
1986	Albert Ford	Builder	Swimming
1982	Alfred Wurr	Athlete	Wrestling
2004	Alistair Swanson	Athlete	Athletics
1983	Allan Boes	Athlete	Golf
1996	Allan Carlson	Builder	Basketball
1997	Allan Robertson	Builder	Baseball
1993	Andy Bathgate	Athlete	Hockey
1989	Andrew Currie	Builder	Football
2001	Angela Chalmers	Athlete	Athletics
1994	Anne Tachan	Athlete	Golf
1997	Arthur U. "Art" Chipman	Builder	Football
2000	John "Army" Howard	Athlete	Athletics
1990	Babe Pratt	Athlete	Hockey
2013	Barney Hartman	Athlete	Skeet shooting
2009	Lesley (Hamerton) Divers	Athlete	Basketball
1985	Ben Hatskin	Builder	Hockey
1991	Bert De Pape	Builder	Aquatics
1983	Bert Snart	Athlete	Horseshoes
2007	Beth Cochran	Athlete	Basketball
1993	Bill Addison	Builder	Baseball / Hockey
1992	Bill Brigden	Athlete	Paddling
2001	Bill Ceretti	Athlete	Canadian football
2004	Bill Ezinicki	Athlete	Hockey
2007	Bill Fairbairn	Athlete	Hockey
1992	Bill Juzda	Athlete	Hockey
1980	Bill Mosienko	Athlete	Hockey
1995	Bill Pidlaski	Athlete	Golf
1984	Billie Hughes	Builder	Trainer
2004	Billy "The Kid" Marquardt	Athlete	Boxing
2004	Robert H. "Bob" Dunbar	Athlete	Curling
1991	Bob Hamerton	Athlete	Swimming
2004	R. W. "Bob" Harley	Athlete	Soccer
1996	Bob McEachern	Athlete	5-pin bowling
2007	Bob Town	Athlete	Basketball
1987	Bobby Clarke	Athlete	Hockey
1989	Bobby Hull	Athlete	Hockey
1986	R. J. "Bobby" Reith	Athlete	Golf
1992	Bonnie Wittmeier	Athlete	Gymnastics
1989	Brian MacLaren	Athlete	Athletics
1987	Bruce Pirnie	Athlete	Athletics
1985	Bryan Hextall	Athlete	Hockey
2004	Bud Marquardt	Athlete	Canadian football
1984	Bud Grant	Builder	Canadian football
1992	Butch Goring	Athlete	Hockey
1983	Carl Ridd	Athlete	Basketball
1985	Catherine Kerr	Athlete	Swimming
1980	Cecil Browne	Athlete	Multi-sport
1993	Cec Watt	Builder	Curling
1986	Charlie Caithness	Builder	Soccer
1986	Charlie Ives	Builder	Squash
1989	Charlie Krupp	Builder	Softball
2004	Ching Johnson	Athlete	Hockey
1999	Chris McCubbins	Athlete	Athletics
2006	Chris Walby	Athlete	Canadian football
2010	Christine O'Connor	Builder	Soccer
2002	Christian Weber	Athlete	Athletics
2012	Clarice Fitzpatrick	Athlete / Builder	Lawn bowling
1998	Cliff Bishop	Athlete	Softball
2004	Cliff Roseborough	Athlete	Canadian football
1982	Conrad Riley	Athlete	Rowing
1982	Cyril Coaffee	Athlete	Athletics
2007	Dale Iwanoczko	Athlete	Volleyball
2007	Dallas Smith	Athlete	Hockey
1981	Dan Bain	Athlete	Multi-sport
2007	Dan Halldorson	Athlete	Golf
1991	Dave Lyon	Builder	Athletics
1996	Dennis Nord	Builder	Volleyball
2009	Derek Riley	Athlete	Rowing
2004	R. H. "Dick" Buckingham	Athlete	Lacrosse
1983	Dick Irvin	Athlete	Hockey
1998	Don Raleigh	Athlete	Hockey
2006	Don Starkell	Athlete	Multi-sport
1993	Donald Sewell	Athlete	Rifle shooting
1990	Donny Lalonde	Athlete	Boxing
1999	Doran Sewell	Athlete	Target rifle shooting
1991	Doreen Wardle	Builder	Figure skating
1994	Doug Allen	Builder	Disabled skiing
1983	Doug Groff	Athlete	Canoeing
1995	Doug Summers	Builder	Hockey
1997	Dylis Turner	Athlete	5-pin bowling
1995	Eddie Mazur	Athlete	Hockey
1980	Eddie Cass	Builder	Baseball
1987	Elfriede Goermann	Builder	Gymnastics
1980	Eric Coy	Athlete	Athletics
1985	Erick Oland	Athlete	Cycling
1981	Ernie Draffin	Builder	Soccer
1987	Ernie O'Dowde	Builder	Lacrosse
1991	Ethel Bieber	Athlete	Swimming
1991	Frank Fredrickson	Athlete	Hockey
2010	Frank Rigney	Athlete	Canadian football
1989	Frank McKinnon	Builder	Multi-sport
1989	Fred Dunsmore	Athlete	Hockey
2000	Fred Ingaldson	Athlete	Basketball
1988	Fred "Steamer" Maxwell	Builder	Hockey
1999	Fred Shero	Builder	Hockey
1980	Fritz Hanson	Athlete	Canadian football
1998	Gail Adamson	Builder	Synchronized swimming
1989	Garth Pischke	Athlete	Volleyball
1999	Gene Turk	Athlete	Squash
1988	George Knudson	Athlete	Golf
1980	George Anderson	Builder	Soccer
1996	Gerry Howard	Builder	Softball
1982	Gerry James	Athlete	Canadian football
1990	Gerry MacKay	Builder	Baseball
1992	Gladwyn Scott	Builder	Multi-sport
2011	Glenn McWhinney	Athlete	Canadian football / Basketball
1986	Glennis Scott	Builder	Baseball
2011	Glenn Scott	Builder	Baseball
1988	Gordon Audley	Athlete	Speed skating
1985	Gordon Konants	Builder	Cross Country Skiing
1987	Gordon "Gordie" Mackie	Builder	Therapist
2005	Grant Ledyard	Athlete	Hockey
2003	Grant Skinner	Athlete	Softball
1994	Guy Simonis	Builder	Multi-sport
2004	Harold Eidsvig	Athlete	Golf
2004	Henry Gerow	Athlete	Target rifle shooting
1999	Herb Embuldeniya	Builder	Boxing
2003	Herbert Olafsson	Athlete	Basketball
2004	Jack Jacobs	Athlete	Canadian football
1993	Jack MacDonald	Builder	Badminton
1984	Jack McCulloch	Athlete	Speed skating
1988	Jack Mowat	Builder	Gymnastics
2004	Jack Secter	Athlete	Athletics
1982	Jack Smyth	Athlete	Athletics
1982	James Houldon	Athlete	Rifle / Handgun / Skeet shooting
1983	R. James Spears	Builder	Horse racing
1990	James Tettamanti	Athlete	Cycling
1986	Janet Nutter	Athlete	Diving
2004	Jeff Nicklin	Athlete	Canadian football
1998	Jim Adams	Builder	Softball
1981	Jim Bulloch	Builder	Basketball
1994	Jim Daly	Builder	Athletics
2004	Jim McFadden	Athlete	Hockey
1981	Jim Trifunov	Athlete	Wrestling
1997	Jim Ursel	Athlete	Curling
1980	Jimmy Ball	Athlete	Athletics
2011	Joan Whalley	Builder	Curling
1984	Joe Keeper	Athlete	Athletics
1982	Joe Ryan	Builder	Football
2004	Joe Poplawski	Athlete	Canadian football
2011	Joe Wiwchar	Builder	Baseball
2004	John McCreedy	Athlete	Hockey
1998	John Potter	Builder	Football
1995	John Trager	Builder	10 pin bowling
2001	Joy Knudson	Athlete	Multi-sport
1980	Judy Moss	Athlete	Diving
2000	June (Baker) Bagley	Athlete	Golf
2004	Casmir "Kas" Zabowski	Athlete	Golf
1987	Kas Vidruk	Builder	Multi-sport
1993	Kaye Minions	Athlete	Lawn bowling
2004	Ken Aseltine	Athlete	Athletics
1987	Ken Ploen	Athlete	Canadian football
1996	Ken Reardon	Athlete	Hockey
1980	Ken Watson	Athlete	Curling
2011	Kerry Burtnyk	Athlete	Curling
1989	Laurie Cohen	Athlete	Athletics
1990	Laurent "Larry" Desjardins	Builder	Multi-sport
1981	Leible Hershfield	Athlete	Multi-sport
2005	Leo Lewis	Athlete	Canadian football
1997	Lindsay Gauld	Athlete	Multi-sport
2004	Lisa Fraser-Gilmore	Athlete	Handball
1990	Lloyd Gunnlaugson	Athlete	Curling
1993	Lyndon Johnston	Athlete	Figure skating
2005	Marcel Mangin	Athlete	Archery
1998	Margeret (Kiggins) Homenuik	Athlete	Golf
1984	Marjorie Edey	Athlete	Golf
2003	Mary Dempster	Athlete	Volleyball
1988	Maureen Dowds	Athlete	Athletics
2004	Mauriel (Bremner) Rogers	Athlete	Golf
2004	Max Kantor	Athlete	Athletics
1993	Max Avren	Builder	Sport medicine
2004	Mel Hill	Athlete	Hockey
2004	Mel Wilson	Athlete	Canadian football
1986	Merv Deckert	Athlete	Handball
1998	Mervyn "Red" Dutton	Builder	Hockey
1991	Monica Goermann	Athlete	Gymnastics
2004	Nick Mickoski	Athlete	Hockey / Golf
1994	Norm Shanas	Athlete	5-pin bowling
1985	Olive (Bend) Little	Athlete	Softball
1990	Ollie Hynduik	Athlete	5-pin bowling
1994	Pat (Chatwin) Ball	Builder	Figure skating
1994	Peggy Colonello	Builder	Golf
2006	Peter Kawulia	Athlete	Boxing
1992	Peter Williamson	Builder	Speed skating / Cycling
1997	Reggie Leach	Athlete	Hockey
2006	Rick Watts	Athlete	Basketball
1994	Robert Boucher	Athlete	Speed skating
2005	Roger Savoie	Athlete	Canadian football
1998	Robert Smith	Builder	Baseball / Hockey
2002	Russ Ford	Athlete	Baseball
1994	Sam Davidson	Builder	Soccer
1988	R. A. Sam Fabro	Builder	Multi-sport
2000	Alexander "Sandy" Gibb	Athlete	Athletics
2010	Shane Moffatt	Athlete	Baseball / Hockey
2001	Sherman Greenfeld	Athlete	Racquetball
1991	Steve Trojack	Athlete	Boxing
2003	Susan Auch	Athlete	Speed skating
1982	Svein Sigfusson	Athlete	Athletics
1982	G. Sydney "Syd" Halter	Builder	Football
1983	Sylvia Burka	Athlete	Speed skating / Cycling
2002	Tanya Dubnicoff	Athlete	Cycling
2003	Ted Green	Athlete	Hockey
2006	Ted Homenuik	Athlete	Golf
1982	Terry Sawchuk	Athlete	Hockey
1985	Terry Hind	Builder	Multipsort
1981	Theo Dubois	Athlete	Rowing
2005	Theresa Brick	Athlete	Athletics / Weightlifting
2001	Tim McIsaac	Athlete	Swimming
1985	Tommy Town	Athlete	Athletics
2003	Tony Nocita	Athlete	Soccer
2000	Trevor Porritt	Athlete	Field hockey
1983	Turk Broda	Athlete	Hockey
2007	Vailla Hoggan	Athlete	Water skiing
1995	Valerie Davies	Builder	Figure skating
1984	Vaughan Baird	Builder	Diving
1981	Vince Leah	Builder	Multi-sport
2004	Victor Lindquist	Athlete	Hockey
2004	Wally Stanowski	Athlete	Hockey
1988	Wezer Bridle	Builder	Volleyball
2002	Willard Reaves	Athlete	Canadian football
1983	William E. "Bill" Lumsden	Builder	Curling
1988	Zlatica Stauder	Builder	Rhythmic Gymnastics
1986	Bruce Reid	Athlete	Water skiing
1986	Ian Reid	Builder	Water skiing
2007	Bryan Wood	Athlete	Curling
1990	Charlie Johnstone	Athlete	Multi-sport
1990	Kas Vidruk	Builder	Multi-sport
1998	Colleen Miller	Athlete	Rowing
1995	David McKay	Athlete	Wrestling
2001	Elaine Jones	Athlete	Multi-sport
1981	Frank Battaglia	Athlete	Boxing
2010	George Phillips	Builder	Multi-sport
2004	Glenn Murphy	Athlete	Handgun
1997	Hugh Gustafson	Athlete	Multi-sport
1995	Jimmy Doyle	Athlete	Golf
2002	Joan Ingram	Athlete	Softball / Curling
2007	John Carson	Athlete	Basketball
1987	Keith Carter	Athlete	Gymnastics
1998	Ken Little	Athlete	Multi-sport
1999	Ken McKenzie	Builder	Hockey
2018	Joe Daley	Athlete	Hockey
2018	Jeff Stoughton	Athlete	Curling
2018	Joey Vickery	Athlete	Basketball
2018	Kirby Cote	Athlete	Swimming
2018	Donna (McCannell) Keating	Athlete	Speed skating
2018	Nieva Embuldeniya	Builder	Boxing
2018	Donald Brownell	Builder	Handball
2020	Ralph Lyndon	Athlete	Multi-sport
2020	Sheldon Kennedy	Athlete / Builder	Hockey / Multi-sport
2020	Jennifer Saunders	Athlete	Racquetball
2017	Bob Kraemer	Athlete	Multi-sport
2017	Bruce Hudson	Athlete	Curling
2017	Cindy Klassen	Athlete	Speed skating
2017	Coleen Dufresne	Builder	Basketball
2017	Wayne Hildahl	Builder	Sports medicine
2017	Jaimie Dawson	Athlete	Badminton
2017	Jamie (Hancharyk) Jones	Athlete	Multi-sport
2017	Sandra Carroll	Athlete	Basketball
2017	W. Arthur "Art" Johnston	Builder	Golf
2016	Alanna (Yakiwchuk) Hinrichsen	Athlete	Athletics
2016	Gary Aldcorn	Athlete	Hockey / Lacrosse
2016	Herb Gardiner	Athlete	Hockey
2016	Jim Heighton	Athlete	Canadian football
2016	Joey Johnson	Athlete	Basketball
2016	John Reilly	Athlete	Rugby
2016	Mike Keane	Athlete	Hockey
2016	Rhiannon Leier	Athlete	Swimming
2015	Arjinder "Archie" Chawla	Builder	Badminton / Squash / Tennis
2015	Bill Ranford	Athlete	Hockey
2015	Gordon Cumming	Athlete	Sports medicine
2015	George Wilson	Athlete / Builder	Basketball
2015	Jeff Powell	Athlete	Rowing
2015	Ken Opalko	Athlete	Basketball
2015	Ken Peters	Athlete	Athletics
2015	Nick Miller	Athlete	Canadian football
2015	Trevor Kennerd	Athlete	Canadian football
2014	Ron Brown	Builder	Racquetball
2014	Mervin Farmer	Builder	Multi-sport
2014	Todd MacCulloch	Athlete	Basketball
2014	Wanda Guenette	Athlete	Volleyball
2014	Al Kinley	Builder	Baseball / Football
2014	Cathy Holtmann	Athlete	Basketball
2014	Chuck Lefley	Athlete	Hockey
2014	Connie Laliberte	Athlete	Curling
2014	Glen Hnatiuk	Athlete	Golf
2014	Gordon Fines	Builder	Baseball
2014	Harry Oliver	Athlete	Hockey
2014	Heather (Newsham) Ruby	Athlete	Softball
2014	Sandy (Newsham) Maskiw	Athlete	Softball
2014	James Donald "Jimmy" Skinner	Builder	Hockey
2014	Jim Schreyer	Builder	Volleyball
2014	Keith McLennan	Athlete	Lacrosse
2014	Lorie Henderson	Builder	Gymnastics
2014	Lorne Benson	Athlete	Multi-sport
2019	Alex Shibicky	Athlete	Hockey
2019	Alf Pike	Athlete / Builder	Hockey
2019	André Rozière	Athlete	Archery
2019	Andy Bieber	Athlete	Canadian football
2019	Art Foster	Athlete	Tennis
2019	Art Shaw	Athlete	Multi-sport
2019	Bill Carpenter	Athlete	Baseball
2019	Charles Showkat Baksh	Athlete	Cricket
2019	Cornel Piper	Athlete	Canadian football
2019	Don Hornby	Builder	Rowing
2019	Dorothy (Ferguson) Key	Athlete	Softball / Baseball
2019	Duncan C. “Mac” Braden	Athlete	Curling
2019	Ed Kotowich	Athlete	Canadian football
2019	Ed Sobie	Athlete	10-pin bowling
2019	Franklin Albert Hawkins	Athlete	Lacrosse
2019	George Druxman	Athlete	Canadian football
2019	Haldor Haldorson	Athlete	Hockey
2019	Harold Mauthe	Builder	Basketball / Canadian football
2019	Harry Nightingale	Builder	Gymnastics
2019	Héctor Vergara	Builder	Soccer
2019	Isa Beairsto	Athlete	Golf
2019	James “Jim” “Babyface” Saunders	Athlete	Boxing
2019	James “Jimmy” Archibald Dunn	Builder	Multi-sport
2019	Jimmy Thomson	Athlete	Hockey
2019	Jon Montgomery	Athlete	Skeleton
2019	Les Lear	Athlete	Canadian & American football
2019	Louis “Lou” Lucki	Athlete	Softball
2019	Mary (Pitts) Dopson	Athlete	Athletics
2019	Maureen Orchard	Builder	Basketball / Wheelchair
2019	Michelle (Bauknecht) Stilwell	Athlete	Athletics
2019	Mud Bruneteau	Athlete	Hockey
2019	Nick Wasnie	Athlete	Hockey
2019	Susanne Dandeneault	Athlete	Weightlifting / Athletics
2019	Vera (Tustin) Gilbert	Athlete	Swimming
2019	William Siddle	Athlete	Baseball
2019	William Wright Breen	Athlete	Hockey
2013	Art Werier	Athlete / Builder	Table tennis
2013	Bill Wedlake	Builder	Basketball
2013	Corey Koskie	Athlete	Baseball
2013	Dale Hawerchuk	Athlete	Hockey
2013	Faye Finch	Athlete	Multi-sport
2013	John T. Haig	Builder	Curling
2013	Shannon Shakespeare	Athlete	Swimming
2012	Clara Hughes	Athlete	Cycling / Speed skating
2012	Ed Belfour	Athlete	Hockey
2012	Grant Standbrook	Builder	Multi-sport
2012	Harry Langford	Athlete	Canadian football
2012	Kelly Hand	Athlete	Sailing
2012	Michael Ireland	Athlete	Speed Skating
2012	Maurice “Mo” Glimcher	Athlete	Swimming
2010	Ken Galanchuk	Athlete	Basketball
2009	Andy Hebenton	Athlete	Hockey
2009	Art Coulter	Athlete	Hockey
2009	Audrey (Haine) Daniels	Athlete	Softball
2009	Bill Nairn	Athlete / Builder	Canadian football
2009	Charley Belanger	Athlete	Boxing
2009	David Drybrough	Athlete / Builder	Athletics
2009	Evelyne Holenski	Builder	Softball
2009	Frank Mathers	Athlete / Builder	Hockey
2009	Harry Broverman	Athlete	Softball
2009	James Murphy	Athlete	Canadian football
2009	Keith Elder	Athlete	Handgun
2009	Lura McLuckie	Builder	Curling
2009	Raymond “Ray” Turnbull	Builder	Curling
2009	Roy Williams	Athlete	Basketball
2009	Sandi Anderson	Athlete	5-pin bowling
2009	Wally Hergesheimer	Athlete	Hockey
2008	Karen Doell	Athlete	Softball
2008	Alexander Bell	Builder	Hockey
2008	Alfred “Ralph” Rowley	Builder	Basketball / Tennis
2008	Dennis Hextall	Athlete	Hockey
2008	Dorothy “Dot” Rose	Athlete	Curling / Softball
2008	Ed Toews	Builder	Volleyball
2008	Eddie Haddad	Athlete	Boxing
2008	Glen Harmon	Athlete	Hockey
2008	Greg Haydenluck	Athlete	Multi-sport
2008	James Ioanidis	Athlete	Tennis
2008	James Patrick	Athlete	Hockey
2008	Jill Mathez	Athlete	Multi-sport
2008	Jim Fisher	Athlete	Cycling
2008	Jim Mutcheson	Builder	Baseball
2009	Juanita Clayton	Athlete	Softball
2008	Thomas Steen	Athlete	Hockey
2008	Lorna Robertson	Builder	Multi-sport
2008	Murray McCaig	Athlete	Sailing
2008	Reid Lumbard	Builder	Curling
2008	Stan Oleson	Builder	Baseball / Curling
2005	Don MacKenzie	Builder	Multi-sport
2005	Doug Steeves	Builder	Canadian football
2005	Marjorie (Manson) Simpson	Builder	Synchronized swimming
2003	Fred Stambrook	Builder	Soccer
2003	Jeff Collins	Builder	Athletics
2005	Dale Bradshaw	Builder	Basketball
2001	Donald Grant McCannell	Builder	Speed skating
2005	Jack Kolt	Builder	Multi-sport
2000	Daniel "Dan" Johnson	Builder	Special Olympics
2000	Peter Porritt	Builder	Field hockey
2000	Mamoru "Moe" Oye	Builder	Judo
1999	Pegi Morgan-Hayes	Builder	Wheelchair sports
1999	Mike Burchuk	Builder	Volleyball
2022	Don Baizley	Builder	Hockey
2022	Halldor Bjarnason	Athlete	Cerebral Palsy Tricycling
2022	Andrea Ferguson	Athlete	Ringette
2022	Patrick Jebbison	Athlete	Basketball
2022	Michelle Sawatzky-Koop	Athlete	Volleyball
2023	Chris Glowach	Athlete	Marathon / Road Racing
2023	Brent Bottomley	Builder	Cross-country skiing
2023	Alex Gardiner	Builder	Athletics
2023	Milt Stegall	Athlete	Canadian football
2023	Kelly Stefanyshyn	Athlete	Swimming
2024	Jennifer Botterill	Athlete	Hockey
2024	Brita Hall	Athlete	Special Olympics
2024	Sandra Kirby	Athlete	Multi-sport
2024	Russ Horbal	Athlete	Sport medicine
2024	Ted Irvine	Athlete	Hockey
2025	Troy Westwood	Athlete	Canadian football
2025	Ashley Lanz	Athlete	Softball
2025	Russ Paddock	Athlete / Builder	Volleyball
2025	Glen Bergeron	Builder	Sports medicine
2025	Gary Solar	Builder	Multi-sport

=== Members by sport ===
Through 2024, 320 Athletes, 139 Builders and 11 Athlete / Builders have been inducted into the Manitoba Sports Hall of Fame. Here's the breakdown by sport. (note: some individuals were inducted for more than one sport and are counted in each of their sports; similarly, individuals who were inducted as "athlete / builder" are counted in both categories)

Sport	Athletes	Builders
5 pin bowling	5	0
10 pin bowling	1	1
Aquatics	1	1
Archery	2	0
Athletics	29	5
Badminton	1	2
Baseball	7	12
Basketball	21	9
Boxing	9	2
Canadian football	38	11
Canoeing	1	0
Cerebral Palsy Tricycling	1	0
Cricket	2	1
Cross country skiing	0	2
Curling	15	7
Cycling	6	1
Disable skiing	0	1
Diving	1	1
Dog sledding	2	0
Field hockey	1	1
Figure skating	2	3
Golf	19	2
Gymnastics	3	4
Handball	2	1
Handgun	3	0
Hockey	63	14
Horse racing	1	1
Horseshoes	1	0
Judo	1	1
Lacrosse	4	1
Lawn bowling	2	1
Marathon	1	0
Multi-sport	23	21
Paddling	1	0
Racquetball	2	1
Rhythmic gymnastics	0	1
Rifle shooting	4	0
Ringette	1	0
Skeet shooting	2	0
Rowing	5	1
Rugby	0	1
Sailing	3	1
Skeleton	1	0
Soccer	2	7
Softball	15	4
Special Olympics	1	1
Speed skating	14	2
Sports medicine	0	5
Squash	1	2
Swimming	12	1
Table tennis	1	1
Tennis	2	1
Therapist	0	1
Trainer	0	1
Volleyball	6	6
Water skiing	2	1
Weightlifting	2	1
Wheelchair sports	0	1
Wrestling	1	0

== Teams ==
Inducted	Team	Season	Sport
1980	Winnipeg Falcons	1920	Hockey
1981	Don Duguid Teams	1970 & 1971	Curling
1982	Winnipeg Toilers	1926	Basketball
1983	Winnipeg Rugby Football Team	1935	Football
1984	Connie Laliberte Team	1984	Curling
1985	Orest Meleschuk Team	1972	Curling
1987	Winnipegs	1932	Hockey
1988	Bole & Richards Pair	1930	Rowing
1990	Winnipeg Victorias	1996	Hockey
1991	Molson Canadians	1968	Softball
1992	Winnipeg Junior Falcons	1921	Hockey
1992	Canadian Ukrainian Athletic Club	1965	Softball
1993	Winnipeg Junior Monarchs	1937	Hockey
1993	Winnipeg Paulins	1954	Basketball
1994	Winnipeg Blue Bombers	1961	Football
1994	Ernie Boushy Mixed Teams	1964-1967	Curling
1995	Winnipeg Stellars	1950-1951	Basketball
1996	Winnipeg Rods	1955	Football
1997	St. Boniface Seals	1938	Hockey
1998	University of Manitoba	1969 & 1970	Football
1999	Flin Flon Bombers	1957	Hockey
1999	A.N. & A.F. Scottish	1954	Soccer
2000	Winnipeg Monarchs	1946	Hockey
2001	Portage La Prairie Terriers	1942	Hockey
2001	University of Winnipeg	1988	Volleyball
2002	Kerry Burtnyk Team	1995	Curling
2002	Winnipeg Rangers	1943	Hockey
2003	Winnipeg Braves	1959	Hockey
2003	Winnipeg Maroons	1964	Hockey
2004	Winnipeg Victorias	1901	Hockey
2004	Winnipeg Victorias	1911 & 1912	Hockey
2004	Winnipeg Shamrocks	1904	Lacrosse
2004	Norwood Wanderers	1913 & 1914	Soccer
2004	Winnipeg Rowing Club Senior Eights	1903	Rowing
2004	Winnipegs	1913	Hockey
2004	Winnipeg Monarchs	1913	Hockey
2004	Winnipeg Scottish	1915	Soccer
2004	Winnipeg 61st Battalion	1915	Hockey
2004	University of Manitoba Juniors	1923	Hockey
2004	United Weston	1924 & 1926	Soccer
2004	Winnipeg Toilers	1927	Basketball
2004	University of Manitoba Varsity	1928	Hockey
2004	Elmwood Millionaires	1931	Hockey
2004	University of Manitoba Grads	1931	Hockey
2004	Winnipegs	1931	Hockey
2004	W. H. Burns Team	1932	Curling
2004	Winnipeg Toilers	1932	Basketball
2004	Winnipeg Junior Monarchs	1935	Hockey
2004	Winnipeg Monarchs	1935	Hockey
2004	Winnipeg Blue Bombers	1939	Football
2004	Winnipeg Blue Bombers	1941	Football
2002	Winnipeg Rangers	1941	Hockey
2004	Winnipeg Blue Bombers	1958	Football
2004	Smitty's	1995-1997	Softball
2005	Winnipeg Jets	1976, 1978, 1979	Hockey
2005	Winnipeg Light Infantry	1952 & 1953	Soccer
2006	Norwood / St. Boniface Legionaires	1952	Football
2006	Nicolett Inn	1979, 1980, 1982	Basketball
2007	Jeff Stoughton Team	1996	Curling
2007	St. Vital Bulldogs	1968 & 1969	Football
2007	Brandon Wheat Kings	1979	Hockey
2007	Mabel Mitchell Team	1983	Curling
2008	Portage Terriers	1973	Hockey
2008	Gordon Hudson Team	1928 & 1929	Curling
2008	Winnipeg Fury	1992	Soccer
2008	David Hamblin Team	2002	Curling
2009	Brandon Wheat Kings	1949	Hockey
2009	Billy Walsh Team	1952 & 1956	Curling
2009	Winnipeg Rods	1956	Football
2009	Winnipeg Blue Bombers	1959	Football
2009	St. James Rods	1961	Football
2009	Winnipeg Blue Bombers	1962	Football
2009	St. Andrews Super Saints	1972, 1975, 1976	Basketball
2010	Manitoba Centennial Voyageur Canoe Team	1967	Paddling
2010	Winnipeg Blue Bombers	1984	Football
2011	St. James Rams	1963	Football
2011	University of Manitoba	1976	Basketball
2011	Winnipeg Mixed 5 pin Bowling Team	1967	5-pin bowling
2012	St. Vital Bulldogs	1960 & 1962	Football
2012	University of Manitoba	1978, 1980	Volleyball
2012	University of Winnipeg	1992-95	Volleyball
2013	Ken Watson Teams	1936, 1942, 1949	Curling
2013	Manitoba Selects	1970	Soccer
2013	Carman Goldeyes	1983-88	Baseball
2014	Selkirk Steelers	1974	Hockey
2014	Winnipeg Blue Bombers	1988	Football
2015	University of Manitoba	1965	Hockey
2015	Winnipeg Rams	1954	Football
2016	Bob Ursel Team	1985	Curling
2016	University of Winnipeg	1971-1974	Volleyball
2016	ANAF Scottish	1962	Soccer
2017	Kelly Mackenzie Team	1995	Curling
2017	Manitoba Junior Lacrosse All-Star Teams	1954, 1955	Lacrosse
2018	Manitoba Ladies Amateur Golf Team	1962	Golf
2019	Howard Wood Team	1930	Curling
2019	Bob Gourley Team	1931	Curling
2019	Jim Congalton Team	1932	Curling
2019	Leo Johnson Team	1934	Curling
2019	Winnipeg Maroons	1935, 1939, 1942	Baseball
2019	Winnipeg Canoe Club	1937	Paddling
2019	Ab Gowanlock Team	1938	Curling
2019	Howard Wood Team	1940	Curling
2019	Jimmy Welsh Team	1947	Curling
2019	Ab Gowanlock Team	1953	Curling
2019	Winnipeg Warriors Team	1956	Hockey
2019	Winnipeg Goldeyes	1957, 1958, 1960	Baseball
2019	Brandon Bobcats	1987, 1988, 1989	Basketball
2021	University of Manitoba	1996, 1997	Basketball
2022	Winnipeg Blue Bombers	1990	Football
2023	Terry Braunstein Team	1965	Curling
2024	University of Manitoba	1999-2003	Volleyball
2025	Lucania Football Club	1987	Soccer

=== Types of teams inducted ===
Through 2024, 112 teams from 13 different sports have been inducted into the Manitoba Sports Hall of Fame. Here's the breakdown by sport.

Sport	Number
Hockey	32
Curling	23
Football	19
Basketball	10
Soccer	9
Volleyball	5
Softball	3
Baseball	3
Lacrosse	2
Paddling	2
Rowing	2
5 pin bowling	1
Golf	1

== Affiliations ==
The Museum is affiliated with: CMA, CHIN, and Virtual Museum of Canada.
