= 1903–04 Ottawa Hockey Club season =

Ice hockey club season of play

1903–04 Ottawa Hockey Club
- Stanley Cup champions
- League: CAHL
- 1903–04 record: 4–0–0

Team information
- General manager: Bob Shillington
- Coach: Alf Smith
- Captain: Harvey Pulford
- Arena: Aberdeen Pavilion

Team leaders
- Goals: Frank McGee (12)
- Goals against average: Bouse Hutton (3.8)

The 1903–04 Ottawa Hockey Club season, the club's 19th season of play, lasted from December 30, 1903, until March 11, 1904. Ottawa resigned from the CAHL after four games and played only Stanley Cup challenges for the rest of the season, winning them all.

== Team business ==
The Club moved to a new rink installed at the Aberdeen Pavilion, which provided 4,000 seats, more than Dey's Rink could provide. A partnership was struck with the Central Canada Exhibition Association which received 40% of the gross receipts and provided facilities. The Club contributed $500 to the installation of the rink.

== Season ==
=== Highlights ===
The season started out with Ottawa winning their first four games. A home game with Quebec was postponed when Quebec could not travel due to a severe snowstorm.

In their third game against the Victorias at Westmount's arena, the Ottawa team arrived 1½ hours late due to a loss of their baggage. The game was called at midnight due to a curfew, with Ottawa ahead 4–1, with 16 minutes left to play. Ottawa and the Victorias had disagreed on substitution for injured players instead of 'recuperation time' and the Victorias used 43 minutes of injury time, which the Ottawa club complained was a stalling tactic to get the game canceled as Ottawa was ahead.

One week later, the League met to reschedule the Quebec-Ottawa game. At the meeting, the League levied a $10 fine against Ottawa for its lateness to the Victorias game, and a fine to the Montreal Shamrocks for lateness to a game in Ottawa. The League then discussed the Ottawa-Victoria match and ordered it to be rescheduled. J. P. Dickson, Ottawa's representative to the meeting, had proposed that it only be played if the match mattered in the standings and threatened to take Ottawa out of the league if the league went ahead and forced the game to be played.

The threat failed, and Dickson called a meeting of the Club back in Ottawa to discuss the situation. The Club executive, against Bob Shillington's wishes agreed to pull the Club out of the league. The team executive was concerned about losing its status as Stanley Cup champions over the matter and consulted with P. D. Ross who agreed that the Cup would stay with Ottawa. The Federal Amateur Hockey League (FAHL) was consulted and Ottawa would join the FAHL for the next season. The Club then submitted its resignation from the CAHL.

After leaving the CAHL, the Ottawas played only one game other than a Cup challenge, an 18—1 exhibition win over the Ottawa Capitals of the FAHL.

=== Final standing ===
Team	Games Played	Wins	Losses	Ties	Goals For	Goals Against
Quebec Hockey Club	8	7	1	0	50	37
Montreal Victorias	8	5	3	0	75	48
Montreal Hockey Club	8	3	5	0	34	49
Montreal Shamrocks	8	1	7	0	32	74
Ottawa Hockey Club	4	4	0	0	32	15

=== Results ===
Month	Day	Visitor	Score	Home	Score
Jan.	9	Victorias	6	Ottawa	10
Jan.	16	Ottawa	8	Montreal	3
Jan.	30†	Ottawa	4	Victorias	1
Feb.	6	Shamrocks	5	Ottawa	10
Feb.	–	Montreal		Ottawa	
Feb.	–	Ottawa		Shamrocks	
Feb.	–	Quebec		Ottawa	
Feb.	–	Ottawa		Quebec	

† Ordered to be replayed but never replayed as Ottawa resigned from league.

=== Goaltending averages ===
Name	GP	GA	SO	Avg.
Hutton, John Bouse	4	15	0	3.82

=== Scoring ===
Name	GP	G	A	Pts	PIM
Frank McGee	4	12	1	13	9
Alf Smith	4	7	1	8	6
Suddy Gilmour	3	6	1	7	3
Harry Rat Westwick	4	5	1	6	0
Scott	2	2	0	2	0
Art Moore	4	0	0	0	9
Jim McGee	2	0	0	0	3
Harvey Pulford	2	0	0	0	3

== Stanley Cup Challenges ==
=== Winnipeg vs. Ottawa ===
Before the CAHL season started, Ottawa defended the Cup against the Winnipeg Rowing Club in a best two-of-three series played in Ottawa 9–1,2–6,2–0 (2–1).

The first game was filled with rough play, with Alf Smith knocking out Joe Hall with a stick hit to the head and knocking out Nick Bawlf. Hall returned to the game and Hall and Smith fought, leaving Hall with a five stitch cut and Smith a four stitch cut. Westwick scored four goals, Frank McGee three. The Ottawa fans booed Ottawa for their rough play. After the game, Winnipeg captain Billy Breen said it was the 'dirtiest game of hockey he had ever played.'

The second game was tame by comparison. Because of the injuries of the first game, Winnipeg needed replacements and added Tammy Hamber of the Toronto Argonaut Rowing Club. Ottawa did not play a rough game and Winnipeg won by a 6–2 score. There was speculation that Ottawa had let up to ensure a lucrative third game.

In the third game, Winnipeg showed that it was capable of keeping up with Ottawa. Smith missed the game to be replaced by Billy Gilmour. The game was scoreless after the first half. Frank McGee scored the winning goal and Suddy Gilmour scored a second goal to clinch the game with seven minutes to play during a power play. Hamber was protested by Ottawa, although he was allowed to play. Referee Trihey was confronted by rough play in the first half, which he countered with ever-increasing penalties to players. According to the Gazette report on the game, at one point only three Ottawa players were on and four Winnipeg players, meaning seven were sent off. During the break between the first and second halves, the ice was not cleaned. The audience numbers were down and this was attributed to the Ottawa Post Office being on fire.

Date	Winning Team	Score	Losing Team	Location
December 30, 1903	Ottawa HC	9–1	Winnipeg Rowing Club	Aberdeen Pavilion, Ottawa
January 1, 1904	Winnipeg Rowing Club	6–2	Ottawa HC	Aberdeen Pavilion, Ottawa
January 4, 1904	Ottawa HC	2–0	Winnipeg Rowing Club	Aberdeen Pavilion, Ottawa
Ottawa wins best-of-three series 2 games to 1

December 31, 1903
Ottawa (9)			Winnipeg (1)	
Player	G	Pos	Player	G
John "Bouse" Hutton		G	Art Brown	
Harvey Pulford, Capt		P	Percy E. Brown	
Arthur Moore		CP	S. Crawford Richards	
Harry Westwick	4	R	Joe Hall	
Frank McGee	3	C	William Breen, Capt	
Suddy Gilmour	1	LW	Billy Bawlf	1
Alf Smith	1	RW	Clint E . Bennest	
Jim McGee		sub	Claude Borland	
Billy Gilmour		sub	Harry Kirby	
Referee – Harry Trihey; Umpires – William A. Northey, C. J. Hanratty

Source: Montreal Gazette

January 1, 1904
Ottawa (2)			Winnipeg (6)	
Player	G	Pos	Player	G
John "Bouse" Hutton		G	Art Brown	
Harvey Pulford, Capt		P	Percy E. Brown	
Arthur Moore		CP	Eric "Tammy" Hamber	
Harry Westwick	1	R	Joe Hall	1
Frank McGee		C	William Breen, Capt	2
Suddy Gilmour		LW	Billy Bawlf	2
Alf Smith	1	RW	Claude Borland	1
Referee – Harry Trihey; Umpires – M. J. McCrory, C. J. Hanratty

Source: Montreal Gazette

January 4, 1904
Ottawa (2)			Winnipeg (0)	
Player	G	Pos	Player	G
John "Bouse" Hutton		G	Art Brown	
Harvey Pulford, Capt		P	Percy E. Brown	
Arthur Moore		CP	Eric "Tammy" Hamber	
Harry Westwick		R	Joe Hall	
Frank McGee	1	C	William Breen, Capt	
Suddy Gilmour	1	LW	Billy Bawlf	
Billy Gilmour		RW	Claude Borland	
Referee – Harry Trihey; Umpires – M. J. McCrory, C. J. Hanratty

Source: Montreal Gazette

=== Toronto vs. Ottawa ===
Next, Ottawa would defeat the Ontario Hockey Association champion Toronto Marlboros in a two-game total-goals series, played in Ottawa, 6–3,11–2 (17–5).

Date	Winning Team	Score	Losing Team	Location
February 23, 1904	Ottawa HC	6–3	Toronto Marlboros	Aberdeen Pavilion, Ottawa
February 25, 1904	Ottawa HC	11–2	Toronto Marlboros	Aberdeen Pavilion, Ottawa
Ottawa wins best-of-three series 2 games to 0

In the first game, the Marlboros led the Ottawas 3–1 after the first half before the Ottawas scored five in the second half to win the game.

February 23, 1904
Ottawa (6)			Toronto (3)	
Player	G	Pos	Player	G
John "Bouse" Hutton		G	Eddie Giroux	
Harvey Pulford, Capt.	2	P	Pete Charlton	
Arthur Moore		CP	Arthur Wright	
Harry Westwick		R	Tommy Phillips	
Frank McGee	2	C	Herb Birmingham	3
Alf Smith	1	RW	Frank McLaren	
Suddy Gilmour	1	LW	Edgar Winchester	
Referee – Tom Hodge; Umpires – W. Foran, J. Fitzgerald

Source: Montreal Gazette

In the second game, Ottawa led by 6–0 at the half, leaving the result not in doubt. The crowd was estimated at 1500.

February 25, 1904
Ottawa (11)			Toronto (2)	
Player	G	Pos	Player	G
John "Bouse" Hutton		G	Eddie Giroux	
Harvey Pulford, Capt.	2	P	Pete Charlton	
Arthur Moore	1	CP	Arthur Wright	
Harry Westwick	1	R	Tom Phillips	1
Frank McGee	5	C	Herb Birmingham	
Alf Smith	2	RW	Frank McLaren	
Suddy Gilmour	2	LW	Charles Earls	1
Referee – Tom Hodge; Umpires – William Foran, J. Fitzgerald

Source: Montreal Gazette

=== Wanderers vs. Ottawa ===
A two-game series between the Montreal Wanderers and Ottawa Hockey Club was arranged, for the Stanley Cup and the FAHL championship. The teams played the first game in Montreal to a tie of 5–5. Montreal refused to play overtime, demanding that the game be considered a no-contest and proposed that the series start over as a best two-of-three series. The Cup trustees demanded that the series continued as scheduled and the Wanderers abandoned the challenge.

Date	Winning Team	Score	Losing Team	Location
March 2, 1904	Ended in a 5–5 tie			Montreal Arena
Ottawa wins series; Montreal is disqualified for refusing to play second game in Ottawa.

According to the Gazette, the game saw "the dirtiest game ever seen between two senior teams at the Arena." Thirty-six penalties were called. Leahy was injured and replaced by Mallan. James Strachan, president of the Wanderers was quoted as saying that the Wanderers would not go to Ottawa and play with Dr. Kearns as referee. Ottawa took a 2–0 lead, before the Wanderers scored five in a row. The Ottawas came back with three, the final goal by Frank McGee.

March 2, 1904
Ottawa (5)			Montreal (5)	
Player	G	Pos	Player	G
John "Bouse" Hutton		G	Billy Nicholson	
Jim McGee		P	Billy Strachan	
Alf Smith		CP	Billy Bellingham	
Harry Westwick	2	R	"Pockey" Leahy, Ken Mallan	1; 1
Frank McGee	1	C	Jack Marshall	1
Billy Gilmour	1	RW	Jimmy Gardner	1
Suddy Gilmour	1	LW	Cecil Blatchford	1
Harry Pulford, Capt	1	Spare	Dickie Boon, Capt.	1
Referee – Dr. Kearns; Umpires – Stevens, Baskerville

Source: Montreal Gazette

The Wanderers demanded a replay of the game to be held in Montreal, which Ottawa refused. The series was cancelled, with Ottawa claiming the FAHL championship.

=== Brandon vs. Ottawa ===
To finish the season, Ottawa played a series with Brandon Wheat City, champions of the Manitoba & Northwestern Hockey Association. Ottawa would win the two-game series 6–3, 9–3 (15–6), held in Ottawa on March 9–11. Brandon wanted to add Clint Bennest and Joe Hall of Winnipeg for the series, but the Cup trustees disallowed the additions as the players had already played for Winnipeg in a challenge against Ottawa. Lester Patrick, in a foreshadowing of the 1928 Stanley Cup Finals, took over for a few minutes when goaltender Dugald Morrison was penalized in game one.

Date	Winning Team	Score	Losing Team	Location
March 9, 1904	Ottawa HC	6–3	Brandon Wheat City	Aberdeen Pavilion, Ottawa
March 11, 1904	Ottawa HC	9–3	Brandon Wheat City	Aberdeen Pavilion, Ottawa
Ottawa wins best-of-three series 2 games to 0

March 9, 1904
Ottawa (6)			Brandon (3)	
Player	G	Pos	Player	G
Bouse Hutton		G	Duchie Morrison	
Harvey Pulford		P	Lester Patrick	
Jim McGee	1	CP	Lorne Hanna	2
Harry Westwick		R	Greoge Smith	
Frank McGee	4	C	Jackie Brodie	1
Alf Smith	1	RW	Lorne Laidlaw	
Suddy Gilmore		LW	Harry Bright	
Referee – Fred Chittick; Umpires – Senator Watson, A. G. Pittaway

Source: Ottawa Journal

March 11, 1904
Ottawa (9)			Brandon (3)	
Player	G	Pos	Player	G
Bouse Hutton		G	Dutchie Morrison	
Harvey Pulford		P	Lester Patrick	
Jim McGee		CP	Lorne Hanna	
Harry Westwick	1	R	George Smith	1
Frank McGee	3	C	Jackie Brodie	1
Alf Smith	4	RW	Lorne Laidlaw	1
Suddy Gilmore	1	LW	Harry Bright	
Referee – Fred Chittick; Umpires – William Foran, Senator Watson

Source: Ottawa Journal

- Spare - Brandon - Robert Cross (Captain), William Hopper, S.G Lowe, H. Breton, F. Wheelan
- Spares - Ottawa - Billy Gilmore - RW, Arthur Moore - D
- Spares - Ottawa - Billy Gilmore - RW, Arthur Moore - D. Colleman Page 98-99.
- Referee F. Chittick - Umpirers Senator Watson, William Foran

== Ottawa Hockey Club 1904 Stanley Cup champions ==
=== Players ===
Forwards

- Frank McGee(rover)
- Alf Smith (also played cover point-Playing-Coach)
- Billy Gilmour
- Suddy Gilmour
- Harry 'Rat' Westwick
- Scott,

Defencemen

- Harvey Pulford (point-Captain)
- Jim McGee (point-cover point)
- Arthur Moore(cover point)

Goaltenders

- John "Bouse" Hutton

=== Coaching and administrative staff ===
- Percy Mituttler (President), Robert Shillington (manager)
- Patrick Baskerville (treasurer), Thomas D'Arcy McGee (secretary)
- Halder Kirby (club doctor), Llewellyn Bates (director)
- Chauncy Kirby, Martin Rosenthal, Charles Sparks (directors)
- Mac McGilton (Ass't Trainer), Pete Green (trainer)

=== Stanley Cup engraving ===
Cyclone Taylor scratched 'Fred W. Taylor' over the official engraving of '1904 Ottawa'.

== See also ==
- 1904 CAHL season
- List of Stanley Cup champions

Preceded by Ottawa Hockey Club; 1903	Ottawa Hockey Club; 1904 Stanley Cup Champions; 1904	Succeeded by Ottawa Hockey Club; 1905
