= Sled dog racing at the 1932 Winter Olympics =

Sled dog race at the III Olympic Winter Games
- Venue: Lake Placid, New York
- Competitors: 12 from 2 nations

Medalists
1st place, gold medalist(s)		Emile St. Godard	Canada
2nd place, silver medalist(s)		Leonhard Seppala	United States
3rd place, bronze medalist(s)		Shorty Russick	Canada

A sled dog race was included as a demonstration event at the 1932 Winter Olympics in Lake Placid. Five contestants from Canada and seven contestants from the United States competed. The event, run under the rules of the New England Sled Dog Club, ran twice over a 25.1 mile (40.5 km) long course. With six dogs per sled, each sled took off at three-minute intervals, and intermediate times were given to the mushers at 4 miles (6.44 km), 10.6 miles (17.06 km), and 22.46 miles (36.14 km).

== Qualification ==
Norman D. Vaughan qualified for the event through a race held by the New England Sled Dog Club in Wonalancet, New Hampshire in the winter of 1932.

Twenty-six teams were entered in the two-day event, which was held two weeks before the Olympics.

It was thought that Emile St. Godard would be unable to compete in the event because of the lack of financial support.

== Results ==
Place	Driver	Race #1	Race #2	Total
1	Emile St. Godard (CAN)	2:12:05.0	2:11:07.5	4:23:12.5
2	Leonhard Seppala (USA)	2:13:34.3	2:17:27.5	4:31:01.8
3	Shorty Russick (CAN)	2:26:22.4	2:21:22.2	4:47:44.6
4	Harry Wheeler (CAN)	2:33:19.1	2:29:35.0	5:02:54.1
5	Roger Haines (USA)	2:34:56.0	2:31:31.3	5:06:27.3
6	Raymond Pouliot (CAN)	2:53:14.3	2:52:21.5	5:45:35.8
7	Jack Defalco (CAN)	2:53:49.5	2:55:50.1	5:49:39.6
8	Stuart Belknap (USA)	2:57:14.0	2:57:08.5	5:54:22.5
9	Henry Murphy (USA)	2:42:49.4	3:15:24.1	5:58:13.5
10	Dexter Sears (USA)	3:00:21.7	3:01:49.5	6:02:11.2
11	Norman D. Vaughan (USA)	3:24:10.0	3:49:46.0	7:13:56.0
12	Eva Seeley (USA)	3:28:01.7	3:46:45.0	7:14:46.7

== Participating nations ==
A total of 12 competitors from two nations competed at the Lake Placid games.

- Canada (5)
- United States (7)
