= Roseborough =

Roseborough is a surname. Notable people with the surname include:

- Barry Roseborough (1932–1992), Canadian football player
- Cliff Roseborough (c. 1910–1984), Canadian football player
- Teresa Wynn Roseborough (born 1958), American lawyer and former Deputy Assistant Attorney General
- Viola Roseborough, stage name of Viola Roseboro' (1857—1945), American literary editor and briefly an actress

== See also ==
- Rosebraugh, another surname
