= Bob Richards (Canadian rower) =

Canadian rower

Medal record

Men's Rowing

British Empire Games
Gold medal – first place	1930 Hamilton	Double sculls

Robert Whitla Richards (July 9, 1909 – May 19, 1989) was a Canadian rower who competed in the 1930 British Empire Games, where he won a gold medal alongside his cousin Elswood Bole. A native of Winnipeg, Manitoba, Richards won the Canadian national championships in the double sculls six times between 1928 and 1950, but missed qualifying for the Summer Olympics in 1932. He also had a term as president of his Winnipeg Rowing Club. By career he was a stockbroker and he served in the Canadian Army during World War II. He was inducted into the Manitoba Sports Hall of Fame and Museum in 1988.

== Early life ==
Richards was born in Winnipeg, Manitoba, on July 9, 1909. In addition to rowing, he was athletically involved in cross-country skiing, golfing, ice hockey, sailing, and squash. In 1926 he began a career as a stockbroker and, during World War II, he served in the Canadian Army, eventually reaching the rank of Captain.

== Rowing career ==
Richards took up rowing in the 1920s with the Winnipeg Rowing Club and won his first Canadian national championship in the double sculls in 1928, alongside his cousin Elswood Bole. They defended their crown the following year and were selected to represent Canada at the 1930 British Empire Games, where they captured a gold medal. They also won the Northwestern International Rowing Association's doubles titles that year in Kenora, Ontario. Richards had his first international success as a single sculler in 1931, when he won the Northwestern title in that category in Minneapolis, Minnesota. He then attempted to qualify for the double sculls event at the 1932 Summer Olympics with Theo Dubois, but they were defeated in the trials by Noël de Mille and Ned Pratt of the Vancouver Rowing Club. In 1933 Richards and Bole won the doubles at the Northwestern regatta in Saint Paul, Minnesota Prior to his career being interrupted by World War II, Richards won the national doubles title again in 1935.

Richards' first post-war competition came as the stroke of a Canadian eights crew in an inter-services regatta in September 1945. Soon after, he began serving as president of the Winnipeg Rowing Club. He won the national doubles titles three more times, in 1947, 1948, and 1950, before retiring after the latter victory.

== Later life ==
During his career as a stockbroker, Richards served as a manager of Richardson's Securities from 1958 until his retirement in 1974. He also served as head of the Winnipeg Stock Exchange and the Lake of the Woods Yacht Club and was board chairman of the Winnipeg Symphony Orchestra. In November 1988 he was inducted into the Manitoba Sports Hall of Fame and Museum. He died on May 19, 1989, at Winnipeg's Heath Sciences Centre. The R. W. Richards Society, which recognizes the top achievers at Richardson's Securities, was named in his honor.
