= Norman Vaughan =

Norman Vaughan may refer to:

- Norman D. Vaughan (1905–2005), American dogsled driver and explorer
- Norman Vaughan (comedian) (1923–2002), British comedian
