= Roy Williams (basketball player) =

Canadian basketball player (1927–2020)

Personal information
- Born: July 8, 1927 Winnipeg, Manitoba
- Died: September 14, 2020 (aged 93)

Career information
- High school: Gordon Bell (Winnipeg, Manitoba)

Career history
- 1945–1950: Manitoba Bisons
- 1950–1953: University of Manitoba Grads

Roy Edward Williams (July 8, 1927 – September 14, 2020) was a Canadian basketball player who competed in the 1952 Summer Olympics. He was born in Winnipeg. Williams was part of the Canadian basketball team, which was eliminated after the group stage in the 1952 tournament. He played all six matches. He was inducted into the Manitoba Sports Hall of Fame in 2009.
