= Juanita Clayton =

Canadian softball player

Personal information
- Born: 10 January 1969 (age 56) Manitou, Manitoba, Canada

Sport
- Sport: Softball

Juanita Clayton (born 10 January 1969) is a Canadian softball player who competed in the women's tournament at the 1996 Summer Olympics. She was inducted into the Manitoba Sports Hall of Fame in 2008.
