= H. Sanford Riley =

Canadian businessman (born 1951)

H. Sanford ("Sandy") Riley CM OM (born 15 March 1951) is a Canadian lawyer and business leader who has sat as a director on numerous boards and was the Chancellor of the University of Winnipeg.

From 2001 to 2003 Riley was Chairman of the Board for Investors Group. He is the CEO and president of Richardson Financial Group, a company he founded in 2003 with James Richardson & Sons, which is a one-third owner of a family wealth management firm of over twenty-seven billion dollars in assets. Some of the organizations he is a director of include the Fraser Institute, the Canada West Foundation and Allstream Inc. Additionally, he was Chairman of the Board for the 1999 Pan American Games held in Winnipeg.

The University of Winnipeg granted Riley, who served as its sixth chancellor from 2000 to 2009 and established a fellowship for lectures in Canadian history there, an honorary doctor of laws in 2016. He was appointed to the Order of Canada in 2002 and the Order of Manitoba in 2013. In 2016 Riley became a member of the Advisory Council to the Order of Canada.

== Personal life ==
Riley was born in Montreal. After earning an undergraduate degree at Queen's University, he earned his law degree at Osgoode Hall Law School and practiced law in Toronto and Winnipeg prior to going into business leadership. A sailor since he was young, he was a member of the Canadian National Sailing Team and competed in the 1976 Olympics. Riley and his wife Deborah have three children and six grandchildren.

In 2009, Riley was inducted into the Manitoba Sports Hall of Fame.
