= 1931 Macdonald Brier =

Canadian men's curling championship

- Host city: Toronto, Ontario
- Arena: Granite Curling Club
- Dates: March 3–5
- Winner: Manitoba
- Curling club: Stratchcona CC, Winnipeg
- Skip: Bob Gourley
- Third: Ernest Pollard
- Second: Arnold Lockerbie
- Lead: Ray Stewart

The 1931 Macdonald Brier, the Canadian men's national curling championship, was held from March 3 to 5, 1931 at the Granite Club in Toronto, Ontario.

Team Manitoba, skipped by Bob Gourley, captured the Brier Tankard with a round robin record of 8-1. This was Manitoba's fourth consecutive Brier championship. A tiebreaker game was played to determine the runner-up as both Ontario and Toronto finished the round robin with 6-3 records. Ontario defeated Toronto in an extra end 13-12 to finish runner-up.

This was the last Brier to feature Montreal and Toronto as their own teams.

The 1931 Brier was one of only two Briers (the other being 1932) to feature no ends that were blanked. This Brier also set the record at the time for the most extra ends played in a single Brier with six (five in the round robin plus the runner-up tiebreaker playoff).

== Teams ==
The teams are listed as follows:

Alberta	Manitoba	Montreal	New Brunswick	Northern Ontario
Red Deer CC, Red Deer Skip: Robert Welliver; Third: Joe LaFrance; Second: Jack Fulton; Lead: George Lindsay	Strathcona CC, Winnipeg Skip: Bob Gourley; Third: Ernest Pollard; Second: Arnold Lockerbie; Lead: Ray Stewart	Montreal GCA, Montreal Skip: William Brown; Third: Art Condie; Second: Rob Braithwaite; Lead: Harry Walker	Bathurst CC, Bathurst Skip: Nicholas Thibodeau; Third: Joseph Connolly; Second: Daniel Connolly; Lead: John Kennah	Sault Ste. Marie CC, Sault Ste. Marie Skip: John Nicholson; Third: James Shaw; Second: George Murr; Lead: Lloyd Mason
Nova Scotia	Ontario	Quebec	Saskatchewan	Toronto
Mayflower CC, Halifax Skip: Henry McLeod; Third: Charles Durrant; Second: Frank Arthur; Lead: H.W. Gates	The Granite Club, Toronto Skip: Ed Brower; Third: John Rennie; Second: John Brower; Lead: Robert Hamilton	Caledonia CC, Montreal Skip: Peter Lyall; Third: Ormiston Roy; Second: Howard Stewart; Lead: John Roy	Saskatoon CC, Saskatoon Skip: Jack Miller; Third: Bill McArter; Second: Bert Barbour; Lead: Percy Young	Barrie CC, Barrie Skip: Selvin Meredith; Third: A.D. Simon; Second: Charles Beelby; Lead: Albert Simon

== Round Robin standings ==
Key
Brier champion
Teams to Tiebreaker

Team	Skip	W	L	PF	PA
Manitoba	Bob Gourley	8	1	138	85
Ontario	Ed Brower	6	3	111	73
Toronto	Selvin Meredith	6	3	100	88
Saskatchewan	Jack Miller	5	4	107	89
Alberta	Robert Welliver	4	5	99	100
Northern Ontario	John Nicholson	4	5	93	102
Quebec	Peter Lyall	4	5	86	104
Montreal	William Brown	3	6	83	113
New Brunswick	Nicholas Thibodeau	3	6	84	96
Nova Scotia	Henry McLeod	2	7	75	126

== Round Robin results ==
=== Draw 1 ===
Sheet A	1	2	3	4	5	6	7	8	9	10	11	12	Final
Montreal (Brown)	0	0	2	0	1	0	0	1	0	0	1	0	5
Ontario (Brower)	4	2	0	1	0	2	1	0	1	2	0	1	14

Sheet B	1	2	3	4	5	6	7	8	9	10	11	12	Final
Quebec (Lyall)	0	0	2	0	0	4	0	1	2	1	0	1	11
New Brunswick (Thibodeau)	1	3	0	1	1	0	2	0	0	0	1	0	9

Sheet C	1	2	3	4	5	6	7	8	9	10	11	12	Final
Manitoba (Gourley)	2	2	3	0	1	0	4	0	4	0	0	0	16
Saskatchewan (Miller)	0	0	0	2	0	4	0	2	0	2	1	1	12

Sheet D	1	2	3	4	5	6	7	8	9	10	11	12	Final
Alberta (Welliver)	0	2	0	0	1	3	0	5	0	3	0	1	15
Northern Ontario (Nicholson)	2	0	1	2	0	0	1	0	3	0	2	0	11

Sheet E	1	2	3	4	5	6	7	8	9	10	11	12	Final
Nova Scotia (McLeod)	0	0	0	0	3	0	0	4	2	0	0	0	9
Toronto (Meredith)	3	1	1	1	0	2	1	0	0	3	2	4	18

=== Draw 2 ===
Sheet A	1	2	3	4	5	6	7	8	9	10	11	12	Final
Saskatchewan (Miller)	2	0	0	3	0	2	5	0	2	0	2	0	16
Alberta (Welliver)	0	1	3	0	1	0	0	2	0	1	0	3	11

Sheet B	1	2	3	4	5	6	7	8	9	10	11	12	Final
Manitoba (Gourley)	4	1	0	0	3	1	1	1	0	3	0	2	16
Ontario (Brower)	0	0	2	2	0	0	0	0	3	0	1	0	8

Sheet C	1	2	3	4	5	6	7	8	9	10	11	12	Final
Northern Ontario (Nicholson)	2	3	1	0	1	2	1	0	0	2	1	1	14
New Brunswick (Thibodeau)	0	0	0	3	0	0	0	2	1	0	0	0	6

Sheet D	1	2	3	4	5	6	7	8	9	10	11	12	Final
Toronto (Meredith)	0	1	0	1	1	2	1	0	2	2	0	0	10
Montreal (Brown)	1	0	2	0	0	0	0	1	0	0	2	3	9

Sheet E	1	2	3	4	5	6	7	8	9	10	11	12	Final
Quebec (Lyall)	0	4	3	1	0	0	0	1	3	1	1	4	18
Nova Scotia (McLeod)	2	0	0	0	3	1	2	0	0	0	0	0	8

=== Draw 3 ===
Sheet A	1	2	3	4	5	6	7	8	9	10	11	12	Final
Alberta (Welliver)	0	1	0	1	3	3	1	0	0	3	0	1	13
Montreal (Brown)	1	0	2	0	0	0	0	3	1	0	3	0	10

Sheet B	1	2	3	4	5	6	7	8	9	10	11	12	Final
Toronto (Meredith)	1	1	2	1	0	2	1	0	1	1	0	0	10
Northern Ontario (Nicholson)	0	0	0	0	2	0	0	1	0	0	1	3	7

Sheet C	1	2	3	4	5	6	7	8	9	10	11	12	Final
Saskatchewan (Miller)	2	2	0	0	2	0	2	0	2	0	1	0	11
Ontario (Brower)	0	0	1	2	0	2	0	1	0	1	0	2	9

Sheet D	1	2	3	4	5	6	7	8	9	10	11	12	Final
Manitoba (Gourley)	2	0	2	0	2	1	1	3	4	0	4	0	19
Quebec (Lyall)	0	2	0	2	0	0	0	0	0	1	0	1	6

Sheet E	1	2	3	4	5	6	7	8	9	10	11	12	Final
Nova Scotia (McLeod)	2	0	1	0	0	0	1	2	1	0	2	X	9
New Brunswick (Thibodeau)	0	1	0	1	2	1	0	0	0	1	0	X	6

=== Draw 4 ===
Sheet A	1	2	3	4	5	6	7	8	9	10	11	12	Final
Ontario (Brower)	2	0	0	1	0	3	1	2	3	0	2	0	14
Alberta (Welliver)	0	1	1	0	1	0	0	0	0	3	0	1	7

Sheet B	1	2	3	4	5	6	7	8	9	10	11	12	13	Final
Saskatchewan (Miller)	1	3	0	0	1	0	0	0	0	1	0	2	1	9
New Brunswick (Thibodeau)	0	0	1	1	0	2	1	1	1	0	1	0	0	8

Sheet C	1	2	3	4	5	6	7	8	9	10	11	12	13	Final
Manitoba (Gourley)	3	0	1	1	0	3	0	0	1	0	1	0	1	11
Toronto (Meredith)	0	2	0	0	3	0	2	1	0	1	0	1	0	10

Sheet D	1	2	3	4	5	6	7	8	9	10	11	12	Final
Northern Ontario (Nicholson)	0	0	0	0	2	4	0	2	2	2	0	0	12
Quebec (Lyall)	1	1	1	2	0	0	1	0	0	0	1	4	11

Sheet E	1	2	3	4	5	6	7	8	9	10	11	12	13	Final
Montreal (Brown)	3	0	0	1	0	1	2	1	0	0	0	1	1	10
Nova Scotia (McLeod)	0	1	1	0	2	0	0	0	1	2	2	0	0	9

=== Draw 5 ===
Sheet A	1	2	3	4	5	6	7	8	9	10	11	12	Final
Montreal (Brown)	7	1	1	1	0	0	2	2	0	0	0	1	15
New Brunswick (Thibodeau)	0	0	0	0	2	1	0	0	1	3	1	0	8

Sheet B	1	2	3	4	5	6	7	8	9	10	11	12	Final
Saskatchewan (Miller)	3	0	2	0	0	1	1	1	1	2	1	X	15
Toronto (Meredith)	0	1	0	1	1	0	0	0	0	0	0	X	7

Sheet C	1	2	3	4	5	6	7	8	9	10	11	12	Final
Ontario (Brower)	1	4	0	2	3	1	0	2	1	1	1	1	17
Quebec (Lyall)	0	0	1	0	0	0	1	0	0	0	0	0	2

Sheet D	1	2	3	4	5	6	7	8	9	10	11	12	Final
Manitoba (Gourley)	0	0	0	0	4	3	1	1	0	1	0	1	11
Alberta (Welliver)	1	1	2	2	0	0	0	0	2	0	2	0	10

Sheet E	1	2	3	4	5	6	7	8	9	10	11	12	Final
Nova Scotia (McLeod)	0	2	2	0	1	0	1	1	0	2	1	1	11
Northern Ontario (Nicholson)	4	0	0	2	0	1	0	0	3	0	0	0	10

=== Draw 6 ===
Sheet A	1	2	3	4	5	6	7	8	9	10	11	12	Final
Montreal (Brown)	0	1	0	0	3	2	0	2	4	0	1	1	14
Saskatchewan (Miller)	2	0	1	2	0	0	1	0	0	4	0	0	10

Sheet B	1	2	3	4	5	6	7	8	9	10	11	12	Final
Toronto (Meredith)	5	1	1	0	4	1	1	0	1	0	1	0	15
Quebec (Lyall)	0	0	0	1	0	0	0	4	0	3	0	2	10

Sheet C	1	2	3	4	5	6	7	8	9	10	11	12	Final
New Brunswick (Thibodeau)	1	0	1	3	0	0	3	0	2	0	4	0	14
Alberta (Welliver)	0	1	0	0	1	1	0	4	0	1	0	1	9

Sheet D	1	2	3	4	5	6	7	8	9	10	11	12	Final
Manitoba (Gourley)	2	1	6	0	2	4	0	1	1	0	0	0	17
Northern Ontario (Nicholson)	0	0	0	1	0	0	1	0	0	1	1	2	6

Sheet E	1	2	3	4	5	6	7	8	9	10	11	12	Final
Ontario (Brower)	2	0	1	1	0	2	1	2	0	2	2	X	13
Nova Scotia (McLeod)	0	1	0	0	1	0	0	0	1	0	0	X	3

=== Draw 7 ===
Sheet A	1	2	3	4	5	6	7	8	9	10	11	12	Final
Northern Ontario (Nicholson)	1	0	0	1	0	2	2	0	3	0	2	1	12
Saskatchewan (Miller)	0	2	4	0	1	0	0	2	0	1	0	0	10

Sheet B	1	2	3	4	5	6	7	8	9	10	11	12	13	Final
Ontario (Brower)	0	0	2	0	1	0	2	1	0	1	1	1	2	11
New Brunswick (Thibodeau)	4	1	0	1	0	1	0	0	2	0	0	0	0	9

Sheet C	1	2	3	4	5	6	7	8	9	10	11	12	Final
Toronto (Meredith)	2	3	0	1	0	1	0	0	1	2	2	1	13
Alberta (Welliver)	0	0	1	0	1	0	4	2	0	0	0	0	8

Sheet D	1	2	3	4	5	6	7	8	9	10	11	12	Final
Manitoba (Gourley)	1	0	0	0	6	0	0	2	0	5	0	2	16
Nova Scotia (McLeod)	0	3	1	2	0	3	1	0	2	0	2	0	14

Sheet E	1	2	3	4	5	6	7	8	9	10	11	12	Final
Quebec (Lyall)	2	0	0	3	0	0	0	1	2	2	3	X	13
Montreal (Brown)	0	1	1	0	1	2	1	0	0	0	0	X	6

=== Draw 8 ===
Sheet A	1	2	3	4	5	6	7	8	9	10	11	12	Final
Manitoba (Gourley)	0	4	1	5	0	5	0	1	1	0	0	5	22
Montreal (Brown)	1	0	0	0	2	0	1	0	0	1	1	0	6

Sheet B	1	2	3	4	5	6	7	8	9	10	11	12	Final
Alberta (Welliver)	3	1	2	3	2	0	1	0	3	1	1	0	17
Nova Scotia (McLeod)	0	0	0	0	0	3	0	2	0	0	0	1	6

Sheet C	1	2	3	4	5	6	7	8	9	10	11	12	Final
Quebec (Lyall)	0	1	3	0	0	1	0	1	0	1	1	2	10
Saskatchewan (Miller)	1	0	0	3	3	0	1	0	1	0	0	0	9

Sheet D	1	2	3	4	5	6	7	8	9	10	11	12	Final
New Brunswick (Thibodeau)	0	4	1	0	0	3	0	1	0	1	0	1	11
Toronto (Meredith)	1	0	0	1	1	0	1	0	2	0	2	0	8

Sheet E	1	2	3	4	5	6	7	8	9	10	11	12	Final
Ontario (Brower)	4	0	4	0	1	0	0	3	0	2	0	X	14
Northern Ontario (Nicholson)	0	1	0	1	0	1	2	0	1	0	1	X	7

=== Draw 9 ===
Sheet A	1	2	3	4	5	6	7	8	9	10	11	12	Final
New Brunswick (Thibodeau)	1	2	2	1	2	0	2	0	3	0	0	0	13
Manitoba (Gourley)	0	0	0	0	0	3	0	1	0	2	2	2	10

Sheet B	1	2	3	4	5	6	7	8	9	10	11	12	13	Final
Toronto (Meredith)	2	0	1	0	1	1	0	1	0	2	0	3	2	13
Ontario (Brower)	0	1	0	2	0	0	5	0	2	0	1	0	0	11

Sheet C	1	2	3	4	5	6	7	8	9	10	11	12	Final
Northern Ontario (Nicholson)	1	1	0	0	1	0	2	4	2	3	0	0	14
Montreal (Brown)	0	0	3	1	0	1	0	0	0	0	2	1	8

Sheet D	1	2	3	4	5	6	7	8	9	10	11	12	Final
Alberta (Welliver)	0	1	1	0	0	1	0	2	1	1	1	1	9
Quebec (Lyall)	1	0	0	2	1	0	1	0	0	0	0	0	5

Sheet E	1	2	3	4	5	6	7	8	9	10	11	12	Final
Saskatchewan (Miller)	1	2	0	6	1	0	3	0	3	1	1	0	18
Nova Scotia (McLeod)	0	0	1	0	0	1	0	1	0	0	0	3	6

== Tiebreaker ==
Sheet A	1	2	3	4	5	6	7	8	9	10	11	12	13	Final
Ontario (Brower)	3	0	2	0	3	0	0	0	0	0	4	0	1	13
Toronto (Meredith)	0	1	0	1	0	3	2	1	1	2	0	1	0	12
