= Fred Ingaldson =

Canadian basketball player (1932–2011)

Personal information
- Nationality: Canadian
- Born: 2 September 1932 Pontiac, Michigan, United States
- Died: 8 August 2011 (aged 78) Winnipeg, Manitoba, Canada

Sport
- Sport: Basketball

Fred Ingaldson (2 September 1932 – 8 August 2011) was a Canadian basketball player. He competed in the men's tournament at the 1964 Summer Olympics.

== Biography ==
Ingaldson was born in Pontiac, Michigan, United States in 1932, before moving to Winnipeg, Canada.

He first played basketball in 1948, while at Isaac Newton High School. While in high school, Ingaldson was named the Ukrainian Athlete of the Year. After he joined the Winnipeg Light Infantry basketball team in 1950, he was part of the squad that won the national junior championships in 1952 and 1953. He then went to Montana State University, where he became the first person from Manitoba to play in the NCAA Division I. Six years later, Ingaldson was part of Canada's basketball team for the 1959 Pan American Games in Chicago.

Ingaldson made Canada's basketball team for the 1960 Summer Olympics in Rome, but he did not take part in any matches during the tournament. However, he did play for Canada at the 1964 Summer Olympics in Tokyo, playing in nine matches for the team. Three years later, Ingaldson was part of Canada's team for the 1967 Pan-American Games in Winnipeg.

Ingaldson retired as a player in the early 1970s, and later became a coach and broadcaster. He also owned a grocery shop in Winnipeg.

Ingaldson was inducted into multiple halls of fame, including the Manitoba Basketball Hall of Fame (1983), the Manitoba Sports Hall of Fame (2000), the Canada Basketball Hall of Fame (2002), and the Montana State Bobcats Hall of Fame (2011). He was also nominated as the Athlete of the Century.
