= Winnipeg Toilers =

The Winnipeg Toilers Men's Basketball Team was a Senior "A" men's basketball team located in Winnipeg, Manitoba, Canada. It has been recognized for its achievements in the Canadian Senior "A" Men's Championships, having won the championship in 1926, 1927, and 1932. The 1926 Team was inducted into the Manitoba Sports Hall of Fame in 1982, followed by the induction of the 1927 Team in 2004.

The Toilers were founded at the YMCA in 1910 under the tutelage of Physical Instructor Bill Alldritt. This team was representative of the province of Manitoba, and guided under the federation of Canada Basketball.

Tragedy struck the Toilers on March 31, 1933, when a Ford Trimotor carrying members of the team from Tulsa, Oklahoma, to Winnipeg crashed near Neodesha, Kansas, killing seven of the 13 people on board.

== 1927 Roster ==
H.A Schendel (G), W. Gayton(F), W. "Waddy" Ferguson(C), Al Silverthorne (G), G.A. (George) Wilson (F-Capt.), G.C. (Gord) Cumming (C), J.L. "Skinny" Clifford (F), Lyn Sinclair (G), Bill Thorogood (G). Dr. F.E. Warriner-Chairman Phys. Dept. Executive, Archie Ferguson-Coach, Wm. A. (Bill) Alldritt-YMCA Physical Director.
