= Phyllis Griffiths =

Canadian sports journalist

- Born: 1905; England
- Died: 1978 (aged 72–73)
- Education: University of Toronto
- Occupation: sports journalist

Phyllis Griffiths (1905 – 1978) was a Canadian sports journalist. She was posthumously inducted into Canada's Sports Hall of Fame as a builder in 1978.

== Early life ==
Griffiths was born to parents Henry Griffiths and Alice Elizabeth Dalton in 1905. The family immigrated to Canada when Griffiths was five years old and she grew up in Toronto, Ontario.

== Career ==
After finishing high school at Parkdale Collegiate Institute, Griffiths was hired by the Toronto Telegram as a journalist. In 1928, she earned her own sports column entitled "The Girl and The Game" which she wrote for 14 years on women's sports at every level. While working for the Telegram, Griffiths attended the University of Toronto, where she played basketball while earning her degree. She spent four seasons with the University of Toronto women's basketball team, where she led the Varsity Blues to three Championships and was captain for one season.

Her journalist gig eventually earned her the role as the first woman photo editor at a Canadian newspaper. Despite this, she continued to coach the Toronto Varsity Blues Women's Basketball Team and led them to back-to-back championships in 1929 and 1930. This was a result of McGill University's efforts to promote equality in sports. The Montreal university threatened to pull-out from inter-collegiate competitions unless every university hired a female coach.

Griffiths retired from journalism in 1967 and subsequently died in 1978. She was posthumously inducted into Canada's Sports Hall of Fame as a builder in 1978. She was also inducted into the University of Toronto Hall of Fame in 1987.
