= Canada's Sports Hall of Fame =

- Panthéon des sports canadiens
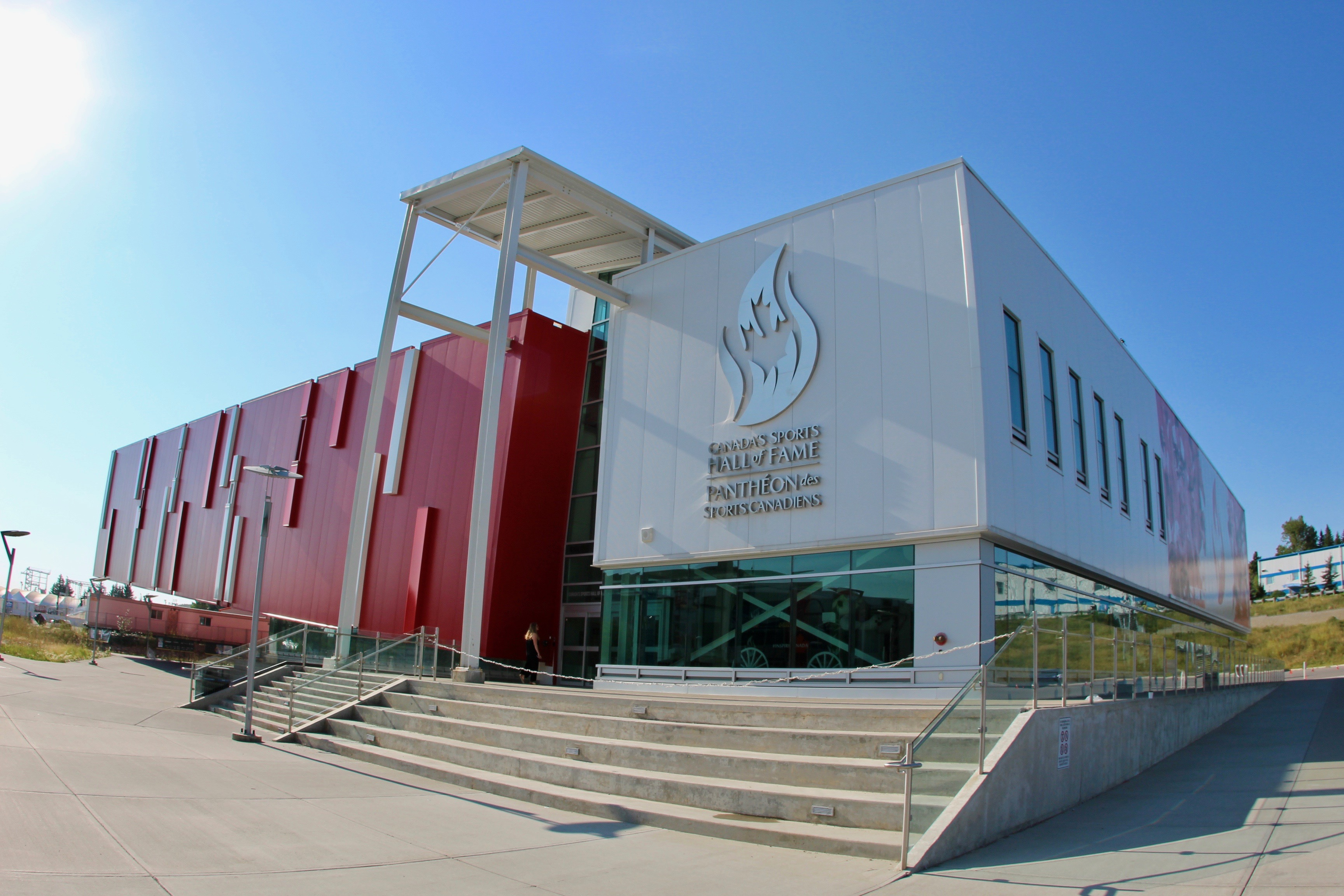
- Exterior facade of Canada's Sports Hall of Fame
- Established: 1955
- Location: 169 Canada Olympic Road SW; Calgary, Alberta, Canada
- Coordinates: 51.0835°N 114.2220°W
- Type: Sports hall of fame
- President: Cheryl Bernard
- Chairperson: Robert Rooney
- Website: www.sportshall.ca

Canada's Sports Hall of Fame (French: Panthéon des sports canadiens; sometimes referred to as the Canadian Sports Hall of Fame) is a Canadian sports hall of fame and museum in Calgary, Alberta, Canada. Dedicated to the history of sports in Canada, it serves as a hall of fame and museum for accomplished Canadian athletes, and sports builders and officials.

Established in 1955, the organization inducted its first class of hall of famers, and opened a museum to the public that year. The museum was originally located at Exhibition Place in Toronto. In 1957, the hall of fame moved to another facility at Exhibition Place, then moved into a new building to share space with the Hockey Hall of Fame in 1961. The two halls of fame continued to share facilities until 1993, when the Hockey Hall of Fame moved to a different location. Canada's Sports Hall of Fame became the building's sole occupant until it was closed in 2006 to make way for BMO Field. The organization continued to induct honourees to its hall of fame, although a new facility to house its museum was not completed until 2011. The 4,100 square metres (44,000 sq ft) facility was opened at Canada Olympic Park in Calgary, and houses the organization's offices and hall of fame museum.

As of 2022, there were 668 inductees into Canada's Sports Hall of Fame, categorized either as athletes, or as builders of the sport. Inductees are nominated by the Canadian public, though are ultimately selected by the organization's selection committee. In addition to inductions into its hall of fame, the organization has also conferred awards for accomplishments in sport, and in the larger community.

== History ==
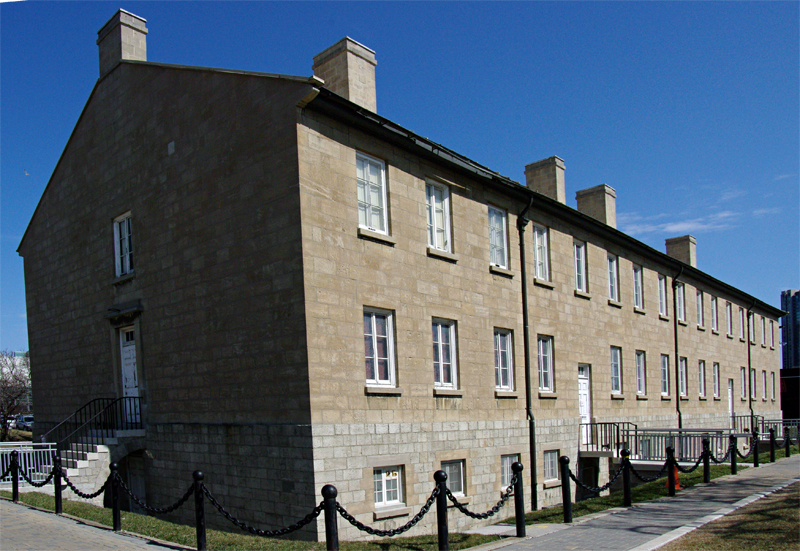
Canada's Sports Hall of Fame was first housed in Stanley Barracks in Toronto from 1955 to 1957

Efforts to create a national sports hall of fame were spurred by Harry Price, the chairman of the sports committee of the Canadian National Exhibition, who began to travel across Canada in 1947 to gather support for a museum and hall of fame. The hall of fame museum was formally opened on 24 August 1955, at Stanley Barracks in Exhibition Place, Toronto. In 1957, the hall of fame was relocated to the Press Building in Exhibition Place, sharing the facilities with the Hockey Hall of Fame.

After the Hockey Hall of Fame announced it would build a new museum and hall of fame building at Exhibition Place in 1958, it extended an invitation to Canada's Sports Hall of Fame to move into its new facility. The Hall of Fame building opened in 1961, and a new wing was added for the Canada's Sports Hall of Fame in 1967, at a cost of CA$400,000 (equivalent to $3,628,729 in 2025). Canada's Sports Hall of Fame would share the same building with the Hockey Hall of Fame until 1993, when the Hockey Hall of Fame moved into Brookfield Place in downtown Toronto. The move of the Hockey Hall of Fame to downtown Toronto led to a decline in attendance at Canada's Sports Hall of Fame in the late 1990s. A plan was proposed to move the hall of fame to the former train station in Ottawa. However, the federal government cancelled those plans in 1999.

Canada's Sports Hall of Fame closed its museum to the public in 2006, with the building being demolished to make way for BMO Field. The organization placed its collections in storage at Stanley Barracks, until a new facility to house the museum was completed. In 2008, the hall of fame's board of governors announced a national bid for a new permanent location for the museum. Nine cities submitted bids to host the museum, although the city of Calgary was eventually selected. Constructed at Canada Olympic Park, funding was provided by the federal, provincial, and municipal governments and private funds. The federal government contributed CA$15 million to the construction budget, whereas the provincial government contributed C$10 million, and the municipal government contributing CA$5 million. Canada's Sports Hall of Fame was tasked with raising an additional CA$20 million to help pay operational expenses. The building opened to the public on 1 July 2011.

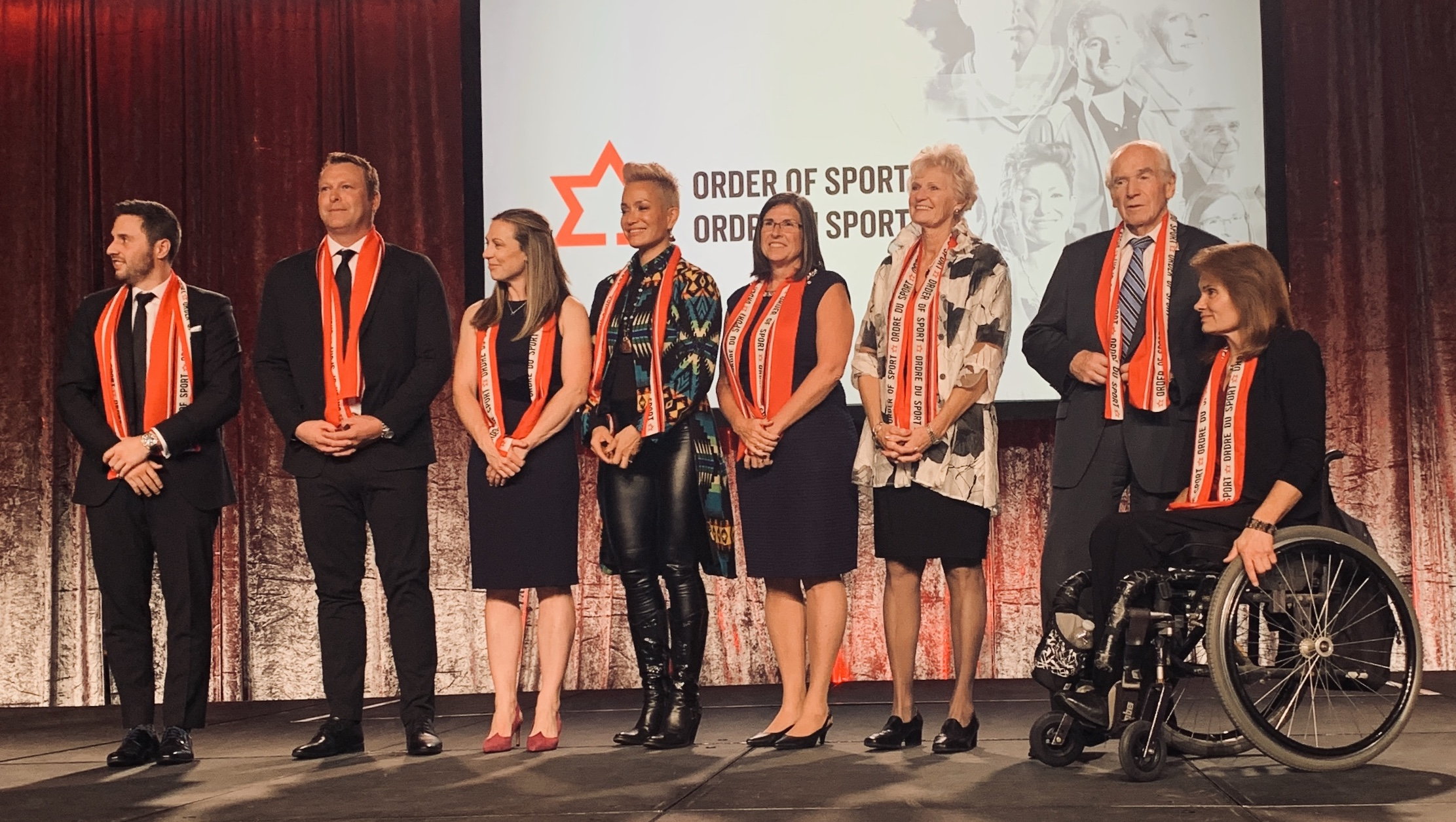
Ceremony for the inaugural members of the hall of fame's Order of Sport, October 2019

In 2019, the hall of fame introduced the People's Choice Award, to recognize an individual sport champion who also contributes to charities and local communities. The inaugural winner of the award was champion golfer and 9-time winner on the LPGA Tour, Brooke Henderson. In the same year, the organization also introduced the Order of Sport Award, which served as a physical award for being inducted to the hall of fame.

As a result of the COVID-19 pandemic, the hall of fame's museum was closed in April 2020, and was reorganized into a digital museum.

== Building ==
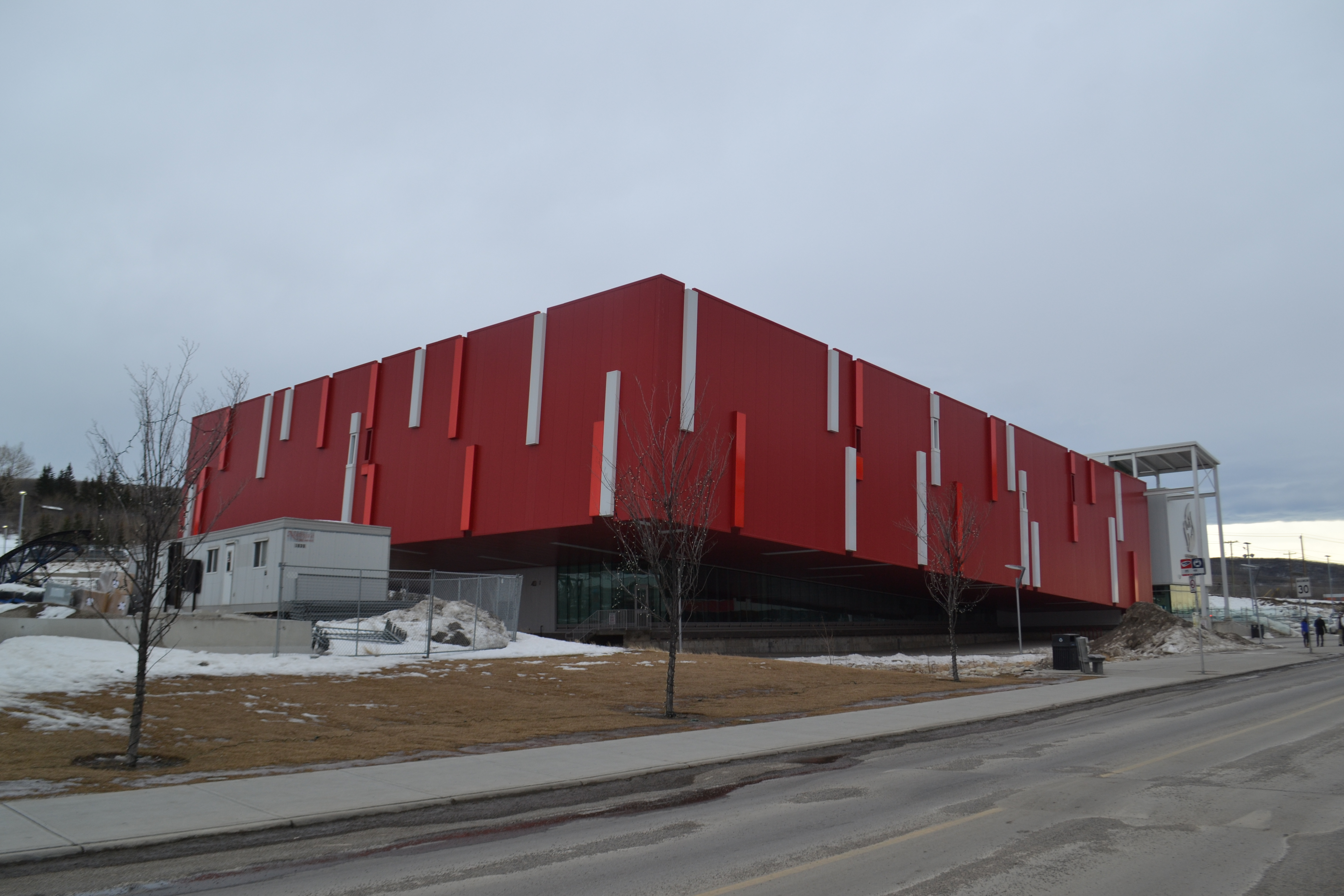
The building cantilevers 12 metres (39 ft) from the ground

The 4,100 square metres (44,000 sq ft) hall of fame and museum building is located on Canada Olympic Road, at Canada Olympic Park, a ski hill and multi-purpose training and competition facility in Calgary.

Completed in 2011, Canada's Hall of Fame building was designed by Stantec, on behalf of CANA Construction, the project manager and design-lead for the museum. The exterior facade with its cantilevered structure, was designed to mimic the elevated platforms where athletes receive their medals. The building colour of red and white was taken from the colours of the flag of Canada. The structure was designed to be a sustainable building, and received LEED Silver certification.

The interior of the building is made of three components, the museum and exhibition halls, the organization's office space, and storage space for the museum's collections. All components of the building are connected through a 2 1/2-storey atrium.

=== Former museum space ===
Prior to the closure of its museum in 2020, the museum and exhibit hall were housed in a purpose-designed on the upper level of the building, with the upper level having more floor area than the floor below it. The museum space took up approximately 2,000 square metres (22,000 sq ft) of the building's floor space. The upper level is perched on the glass and steel structure, and cantilevers 12 metres (39 ft) above the lower floor, creating the illusion that the upper level was floating. The cantilevered area also held exhibits on individual sports.

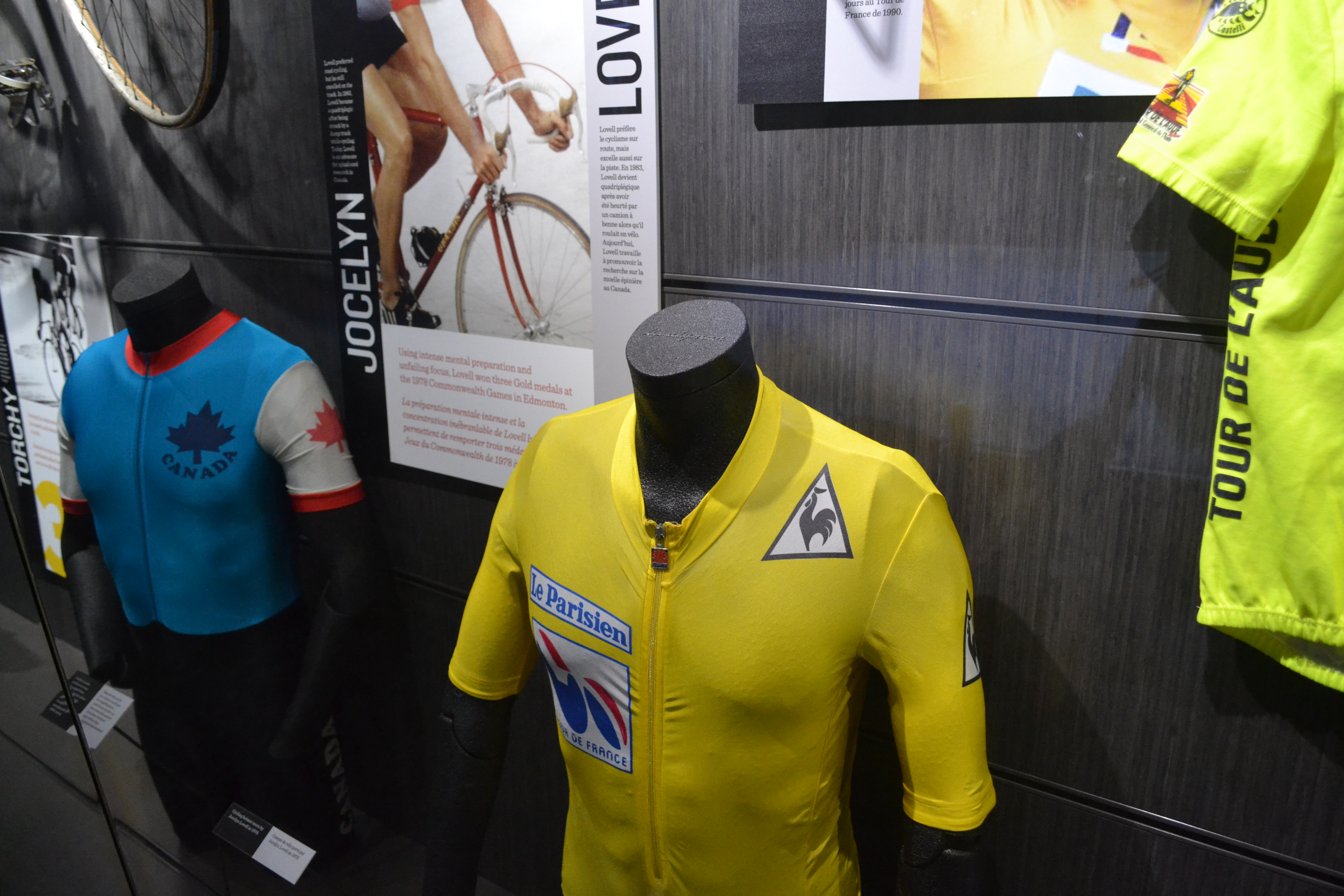
Exhibit on cycling at Canada's Sports Hall of Fame

The museum space featured twelve galleries, a theatre, and interactive exhibits on the hall of fame's inductees, and Canadian sport. The museum's twelve themed galleries located on various levels, were separated by a "series of bays". The exhibits are designed to circulate around the museum's central atrium or the "Grand Hall," which houses six national trophy exhibits. The design of the museum exhibits was done by Cambridge Seven Associates.

The museum's collections includes over 60,000 photographs, and 100,000 artifacts. After the museum space was closed, artifacts belong to the hall of fame were transferred to the Canadian Museum of History for safekeeping in 2023.

== Inductees ==
As of November 2019, Canada's Sports Hall of Fame had over 670 inductees, categorized either as athletes or builders of the sport. Beginning with the induction of the 2019 class of hall of famers, Canada's Sports Hall of Fame began to issue the Order of Sport award to inductees, as a physical token of their induction into the hall of fame. Hall of famers that were inducted prior to 2019 were all retroactively made "peers" of the order, upon its creation.

Nominations for inductees are accepted from the Canadian public throughout the year. Athletes nominated are required to have been retired for at least four years, although builders may be nominated when they are still active in their careers. Animals and inanimate objects may be considered for induction, although their nomination requires the approval of the Hall's Board of Governors.

A new group of inductees has been introduced into Canada's Sports Hall of Fame annually since its inception in 1955. The annual election of nominees is chosen through a selection committee of ten to 16 people.

=== Canadian sport legends class ===
On June 17, 2015, the Hall of Fame introduced the Sport Legends class of inductees, made up of athletes whose careers occurred before 1955. The creation of the Sport Legend class was undertaken in commemoration of the 150th anniversary of Canada.

Athletes

- George Burleigh
- William Cecil Billy Christmas
- Alex Decoteau
- Carol Ann Duthie
- Alfred Cam Ecclestone
- Larry Gains
- Bob Goldham
- Gerald Gratton
- Robina Higgins Haight
- Barbara Howard
- Bill Isaacs
- Joe Keeper
- Johnny Loaring
- Harry Xul-si-malt Manson
- Vincent McIntyre
- Robert McLeod
- Aileen Meagher
- Albert Murray
- Charles Murray
- Alf Philips
- Robert Pirie
- Robert Powell
- Harvey Pulford
- Robert Scotty Rankine
- Hilda Ranscombe
- Eileen Whalley Richards
- Winnie Roach-Leuszler
- Mary Rose Thacker
- Elizabeth Whittall
- Rhona and Rhoda Wurtele

Builders

- Earl Bascom
- Frank Calder
- James Creighton
- Norton Crow
- Sidney Dawes
- Jan Eisenhardt
- Alexandrine Gibb
- Cecil Grenier
- Phyllis Griffiths
- Frederick James Heather
- Frank Read
- Melville Marks "Bobby" Robinson
- William Shuttleworth
- Henry Sotvedt
- Stanley Thompson

== See also ==
- Alberta Sports Hall of Fame
- BC Sports Hall of Fame
- Manitoba Sports Hall of Fame and Museum
- New Brunswick Sports Hall of Fame
- Nova Scotia Sport Hall of Fame
- Ontario Sports Hall of Fame
