= Rosebraugh =

Rosebraugh is a surname. Notable people with the surname include:

- Craig Rosebraugh (born 1972), American writer, filmmaker, and animal rights activist
- Eli Rosebraugh (1875–1930), American baseball player
- Keri Rosebraugh, American artist and art administrator

== See also ==
- Roseborough, another surname
