= Robina Higgins =

Canadian athletics competitor

Robina Higgins-Haight (28 April 1915 – 31 December 1990) was one of Canada's best female athletes in the 1930s.

From Winnipeg, Manitoba, Higgins excelled in the javelin, shot put, and ball throw competition. In the javelin, she set a Canadian record throw of 131 feet 11.75 inches (40.2273 m) in 1938. This mark stood until 1952. In a 1935 ball throw event, she set a record of 222 feet 2 inches (67.72 m), a distance that was unsurpassed until 1947.

During her brief career, Higgins won nine national titles and was given the Velma Springstead Trophy as the country's outstanding female athlete in 1937. In addition to three titles in javelin and ball throw, two in shot put, and one in discus, during national and abbreviated Canadian competition, Higgins also won the gold medal in the javelin event at the 1938 British Empire Games in Sydney, Australia. She was inducted into the Manitoba Sports Hall of Fame.

She died in Winnipeg on 31 December 1990 and posthumously inducted into the Canada's Sports Hall of Fame in 2015.
