= Eileen Whalley Richards =

Canadian speed skater

Personal information
- Born: 13 April 1923 Manitoba, Canada
- Died: 3 February 2015 (aged 89)

Sport
- Country: Canada
- Sport: Speed skating

Eileen Alma Richards (nee Whalley; April 13, 1923 – February 3, 2015) was a Canadian speed skater. During her career, Whalley earned provincial, national and North American championship titles. She was posthumously inducted into Canada's Sports Hall of Fame.

== Early life ==
Whalley was born on April 13, 1923, in Manitoba, Canada. She was born to parents Ellen Belle and Robert Whalley.

== Career ==
After seeing her older brother Evan compete in speed skating, Whalley started racing competitively in 1938. Her first win was during the Winnipeg city championship in the Grade 9 relay. She soon moved up to the intermediate division where she competed in the Minneapolis trials and the Silver-Skae inter-club meet.

By 1942, Whalley was promoted to the senior level and she subsequently won the Winnipeg Club Championship and international senior Manitoba meet. Between 1943 and 1945, Whalley won the 10,000 Lakes international event in St. Paul, Minnesota, for three consecutive years. After her first win in 1943, she was presented with a gold locket by club president J. Nellson. Following her third consecutive win at the 10,000 Lakes international event, Whalley was a runner up for the Lou Marsh Trophy in 1946.

While men were sent overseas during WW2, Whalley was co-champion in the Senior Ladies Manitoba Open competition which she won four times from 1943 until 1946. In 1944, after winning the Senior Lady aggregate cup, Manitoba Hotel cup, and Ten Thousand Lakes meet Whalley was presented with Outstanding Lady Skater Award by the Winnipeg Speed Skating Association. In 1945, Richards became the only Canadian to win the Detroit Times 25th Annual Gold Skates Derby and the Harry Carl Trophy. She also captured the Wyandotte Michigan Gold Cup Senior Women's Championship that same year. However, this fact was lost in history until 1989 as the Toronto Star had misprinted the first Canadian winner of the Gold Skates award in the annual Detroit Gold-Silver Derby. In 1989, the Star printed that Ozzie Martin was the first, instead of Whalley. When the reporter called the president of the Detroit Gold-Silver Derby, he claimed that "no Canadian could have won the award before 1970 because the contest was closed to foreigners until then." However, upon checking older record, it was found that Whalley was the first Canadian to win the Gold Skates.

After the war, Whalley competed in the 1946 North American championships where she earned the senior women's crown while also setting a new record for the 440-yard event by completing it in 43 seconds. She also beat the previous 800 record set by Gladys Robinson in 1923, with a time of 1.46 2/5. This would however come to be her last competitive event as in November 1947, she married Donald Gair. As a result, she missed a month with the Winnipeg Skating Club. Whalley eventually moved to Toronto with her husband, and retired from speed skating.

However, after Whalley was widowed in 1962 by her husband Donald Gair, she became engaged to Kenneth Richards on September 11, 1963.

In 2001, she joined her aunt Lillian Simpson and sister-in-law Joan Whalley in the Manitoba Sports Hall of Fame and Museum. In 2015, after her death, she was inducted into Canada's Sports Hall of Fame.
