= Emile St. Godard =

Canadian dog musher (1905–1948) Sorel, Québec

Emile St. Godard (15 August 1905 – 26 March 1948) was a Canadian dog musher and dog sled racer from Winnipeg, Manitoba. He was a renowned musher in the 1920s and 1930s, with much of his fame derived from racing Leonard Seppala and his victory in the demonstration race at the 1932 Winter Olympics at Lake Placid, New York. In 1956 he became the only dog sled racer to be entered into Canada's Sports Hall of Fame.

== Racing career ==
Following his family's move from Fisher Branch to The Pas in 1916, St. Godard's brother began training a dog team however the family felt he was too young to race. In 1924 he won his first race, around the streets of his home town.

St. Godard's first major win was The Pas Dog Derby in 1925, which was one of the world's premier dog sled races during this period. He won this race five times in a row until 1929. He would lose the 1930 race to Earl Brydges by twelve and a half minutes after coming in with three tired dogs on his sled.

Following his victory in the dog derby at Ottawa's first Winter Carnival in February 1930, he was presented with a gold challenge cup and a cheque for one thousand dollars by Mayor Frank H. Plant at a lavish reception in the Château Laurier. He dominated the field for so long that fans often referred to the races at the time as "St. Godard against the field".

He received a citation from the Canadian Federation of Humane Societies for his kindness and concern for his dogs. His lead dog, Toby, was a husky-greyhound cross and was such an integral part of St. Goddard's crew that when Toby could no longer race, St. Goddard retired also.

Posthumously in 1956 he was inducted posthumously into Canada's Sports Hall of Fame, and in 2007 into the Manitoba Sports Hall of Fame. He remains the only dog sled racer to be recognised by either the national or provincial awards.

=== Rivalry with Leonard Seppala ===
Seppala and St. Godard faced each other annually at the Eastern International Dog Derby in Quebec. Over six years, St. Godard would win the race four times, and Seppala twice. The duo also faced off in a variety of other races over the years, during which St. Godard won the majority of the races.

=== Olympic games ===
Dog sledding was included as an exhibition sport at the 1932 Winter Olympics. There were twelve competitors from both the United States and Canada. St. Godard and Seppala would place first and second overall, with St. Godard taking the victory after winning both of the 50-mile races involved. Following his rival's victory, Seppala acknowledged his rival's superiority and didn't compete with him afterwards.
