= Theo Dubois =

Canadian rower

Theo Alfred Dubois (May 19, 1911 – June 10, 2011) was a champion rower from Winnipeg, Manitoba, Canada. He was born in Brussels, Belgium.

In 1939, he won the United States and Canadian doubles amateur rowing championships, teaming with Albert Riley. This qualified them for the 1940 Olympics, which were however cancelled due to the outbreak of World War II.

In 1940 in singles competition, he finished second to American Joe Burk in both the U.S. and Canadian championships. Dubois was looking forward to a rematch in 1941, but Burk turned professional. Dubois won the U.S. and Canadian amateur titles in 1941 and was awarded the Lou Marsh Trophy as Canada's top athlete of the year. He was the first athlete from Western Canada to win the award.

In 1948 he won the Canadian Association of Amateur Oarsman (CAAO) qualifying singles race for the Olympics. However the Canadian Olympian selection committee decided that he was too old to represent his country. In the 1948 Summer Olympics, the eventual gold medal winning time was slower than Dubois' time in the qualifying race.

Dubois was a long-time member and coach at the Winnipeg Rowing Club, where he was made honorary president in 1978. He was inducted into the Manitoba Sports Hall of Fame and Museum in 1981.

Outside of sports, Dubois graduated with a bachelor's degree in architecture from the University of Manitoba and became a professional architect. He worked as a planning examiner in Winnipeg.
