= Billy Bawlf =

Canadian ice hockey player (1881–1972)

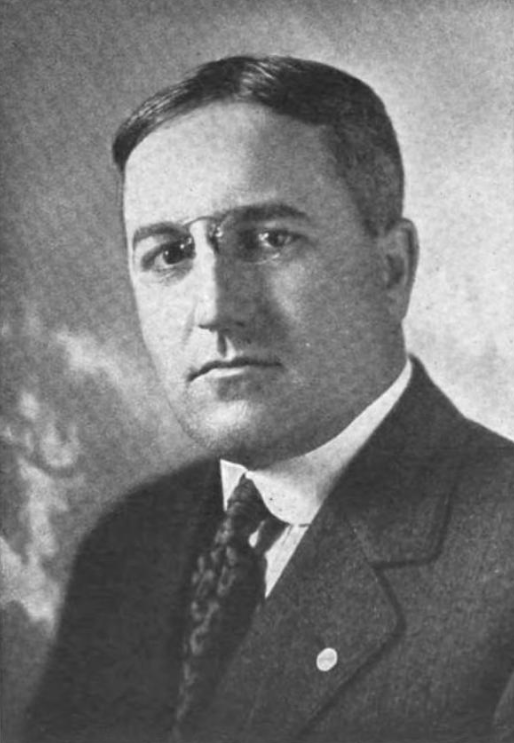
- Born: January 17, 1881 Winnipeg, Manitoba, Canada
- Died: January 6, 1972 (aged 90) Winnipeg, Manitoba, Canada
- Height: 5 ft 6 in (168 cm)
- Weight: 150 lb (68 kg; 10 st 10 lb)
- Position: Forward
- Played for: Winnipeg Rowing Club; Winnipeg Victorias
- Playing career: 1900–1905

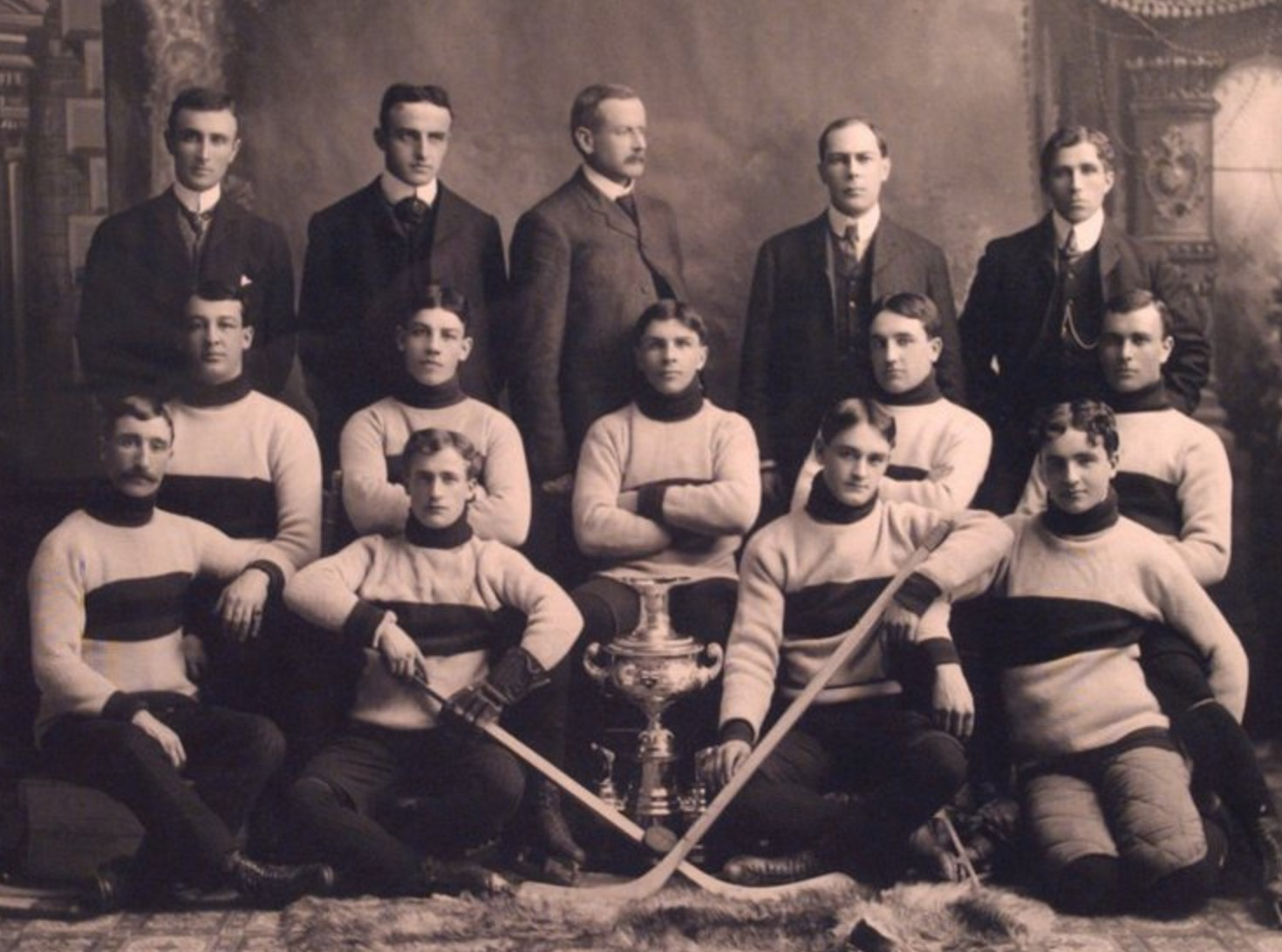
Bawlf, second from right in the middle row, with the 1904 Winnipeg Rowing Club ice hockey team.

William Richard Bawlf (January 17, 1881 – January 6, 1972) was a Canadian ice hockey player in the early 1900s.

At the time of the 1911 Canadian Census, he was married to Mary Ada Bawlf, and had three children, Nicholas William, Rowena Eleanor and Robert Samuel. His wife died in 1943, and he died in 1972.

== Playing career ==
Born in Winnipeg, Manitoba, Canada, Billy joined the Winnipeg Victorias in 1900. He played two seasons for the club, including their Stanley Cup win, in 1901, although he did not play in the challenge series. In 1902, he joined the Winnipeg Rowing Club team for two seasons. The club played an unsuccessful challenge of the Ottawa Silver Seven in 1904.

His cousin Nick Bawlf (1884–1947) played briefly with the Montreal Canadiens and Montreal Wanderers in the National Hockey Association.
