= Nick Miller (Canadian football) =

Canadian football player (born 1931)

Profile
- Position: Halfback

Personal information
- Born: September 15, 1931 (age 95)
- Listed height: 6 ft 1 in (1.85 m)
- Listed weight: 195 lb (88 kg)

Career history
- 1953–1964: Winnipeg Blue Bombers

Awards and highlights
- 4× Grey Cup champion (1958, 1959, 1961, 1962)

Nick Miller (born September 15, 1931) is a former Canadian football player who played for the Winnipeg Blue Bombers. He won the Grey Cup with Winnipeg in 1958, 1959, 1961 and 1962.
