= Glenn McWhinney =

Profile
- Positions: Halfback, Quarterback

Personal information
- Born: August 10, 1930; Winnipeg, Manitoba, Canada
- Died: April 14, 2012 (aged 81); Winnipeg, Manitoba, Canada
- Listed height: 5 ft 11 in (1.80 m)
- Listed weight: 166 lb (75 kg)

Career history
- 1952–1954: Edmonton Eskimos
- 1955–1956: Winnipeg Blue Bombers

Awards and highlights
- Grey Cup champion (1954)

Glenn Simpson "Keeper" McWhinney (August 10, 1930 – April 14, 2012) was a Canadian professional football player who played for the Edmonton Eskimos and Winnipeg Blue Bombers. He won the Grey Cup with the Eskimos in 1954. McWhinney's football career was ended in 1956 when he sustained a broken neck. He later joined the Blue Bombers as a scout from 1956 to 1958. McWhinney also played basketball in the Winnipeg Men's Senior League. He died in 2012; a park in Winnipeg is named after him.

McWhinney's son Jeff serves as the current keeper of the Grey Cup trophy.
