= Bob Gourley =

Canadian curler

- Curler
- Born: February 20, 1878; Chinguacousy, Ontario, Canada
- Died: March 11, 1976 (aged 98); La Jolla, California, United States

Team
- Curling club: Strathcona Curling Club
Medal record
Representing Manitoba
Macdonald Brier
Gold medal – first place	1931 Toronto

Robert John Gourley (February 20, 1878 – March 11, 1976) was a Canadian curler. He was the skip of the 1931 Brier Champion team, representing Manitoba.
