= Billy Breen =

Canadian ice hockey player

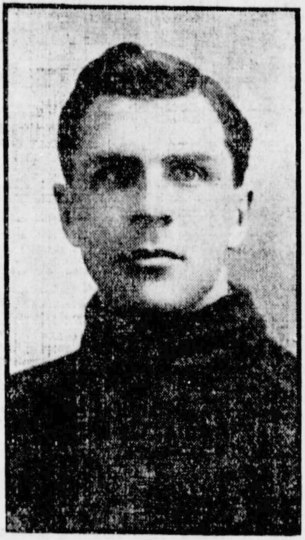
- Born: December 6, 1882 Winnipeg, Manitoba, Canada
- Died: September 3, 1927 (aged 44) Rochester, Minnesota, U.S.
- Weight: 140 lb (64 kg; 10 st 0 lb)
- Position: Center
- Played for: Winnipeg Hockey Club; Winnipeg Rowing Club; Winnipeg Strathconas
- Playing career: 1899–1909

William Wright Breen (December 6, 1882 – September 3, 1927) was a Canadian ice hockey centreman who played ten years in the Manitoba Senior Hockey League, from 1900 to 1909.

== Biography ==
Billy Breen was born in Winnipeg, Manitoba in 1882 to Richard Breen and Sarah Ann Wright. The family had come to Manitoba from Ireland in the early 1880s and Billy Breen's older siblings, including his two brothers Nixon and Thomas, were born in County Fermanagh in northern Ireland.

Breen, first starting out with the Winnipeg Assiniboines, was a prolific scorer in the Manitoba Hockey Association during the first decade of the 1900s, playing for the Winnipeg Hockey Club, Winnipeg Rowing Club and Winnipeg Strathconas between 1899 and 1909, leading the Manitoba ice hockey senior circuit in scoring four times (1903, 1904, 1906 and 1907).

From December 30, 1903 to January 4, 1904 Breen played with the Winnipeg Rowing Club in a Stanley Cup challenge series against the reigning cup holders the Ottawa Hockey Club of the CAHL, at the Aberdeen Pavilion in Ottawa. The three games series ended 13-7 (9-1, 2-6 and 2–0) in favor of the Ottawa Hockey Club. Breen scored two goals in the second game, while Frank McGee and Suddy Gilmour tallied the only goals in the final contest. Breen had also scored the only Rowing Club goal in the first game, on a combination play with teammate Joe Hall, making it three goals in total for him during the series. After the first game he complimented the Ottawa team's defense and forwards but also gave the Ottawa team a backhanded comment regarding their rough style of play.

"All I have to say is that it was the dirtiest game I ever played in. If it continues we will have to wire home for more spare men. Ottawas have a corking fine forward line and the defense was impregnable. Still we are confident that we have a good show of lifting the cup."

– Billy Breen on the Ottawa Hockey Club after the first Stanley Cup challenge game on December 30, 1903.

Breen played the predominant bulk of his career as an amateur, outside of the 1907–08 season with the Winnipeg Strathconas in the professional Manitoba Hockey League, and one game with the Winnipeg Hockey Club in 1908–09 in the same league. In December 1909, at the onset of the 1909–10 season, the Winnipeg Shamrocks made preparations to enter a Stanley Cup challenge against the Ottawa Senators of the short-lived CHA, and were to bring out Billy Breen, Billy Keane and Harry Kennedy from retirement for the challenge, but the meeting between the two clubs never materialized.

In 1913 Breen won the Allan Cup as a coach of the Winnipeg Hockey Club.

After his playing career Breen was involved as a businessman, as a secretary treasurer, with the Breen Motor Company Ltd., a company he ran with his two older brothers Nixon and Tom selling automobiles. He died on September 3, 1927, at the Mayo Brothers Hospital in Rochester, Minnesota of lymphosarcoma after an operation. He was 44 years old and left a wife and a son.

== Playing style ==
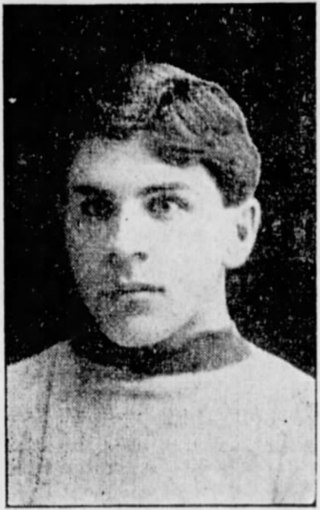
Breen with the Winnipeg Rowing Club.

"Our fellows are purely amateur and cannot afford to appear at their offices with their heads all bandaged up. Their employers object, and so do the men themselves. If they cannot go through a game without being disfigured, they do not want to play. There is no use trying to play with such players as we were against in this game, so we retire from the game entirely. We want no more of it under any circumstances. Such hockey is nothing short of brutal."

— Breen on the rougher aspects of the game after a game against the Winnipeg Maple Leafs on December 19, 1907.

Breen although a light player, weighing in at only 140 pounds, was nonetheless very well built to withstand the game of the early 1900s. He combined great speed with good stick-handling and was always dangerous on the rush. He played on the centre forward position with a primary task of scoring goals. Ottawa Citizen, in their write-up to the December 1903–January 1904 Stanley Cup challenge series between the Ottawa Hockey Club and the Winnipeg Rowing Club, described Breen as a "dashing little center forward" and claimed him to be "one of the most spectacular little forwards that ever hit the ice."

Breen objected to the over-the-top violence that often occurred in early amateur and professional ice hockey. An exhibition game between the Winnipeg Hockey Club (with Breen on the ice) and the Winnipeg Maple Leafs on December 19, 1907, at the onset of the 1907–08 season, turned unusually violent and several players, most of them on the Winnipeg Hockey Club, were badly injured before the Winnipeg Hockey Club team refused to go on with the game any longer after a mix-up between Hockey Club defenseman Percy Browne and Maple Leafs forward Harry Smith.

Joe Hall, Breen's former teammate on the Winnipeg Rowing Club, was the chief offender on the Maple Leafs during the December 19, 1907 game, rendering Charlie Tobin a deep wound in his temple, and Winnipeg Maple Leafs manager Jack Lee said after the game that he regretted the incidents probably more than anyone else.

== Career statistics ==
=== Regular season and playoffs ===
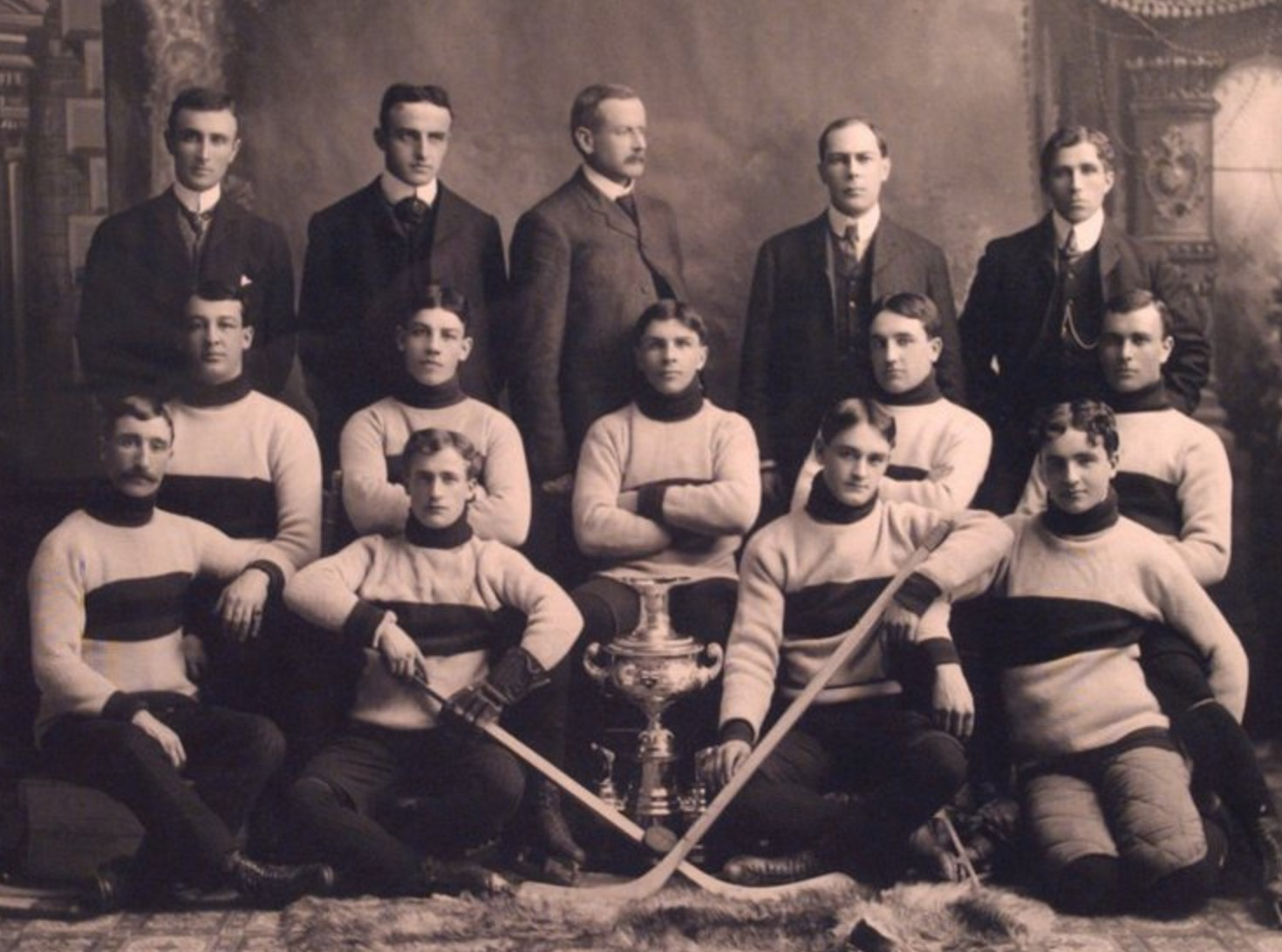
Breen, seated in the center, with the 1904 Winnipeg Rowing Club ice hockey team.

MHA Int. = MHA Intermediate

			Regular season					Playoffs
Season	Team	League	GP	G	A	Pts	PIM	GP	G	A	Pts	PIM
1899–1900	Winnipeg Hockey Club	MHA Int.	8	16	1	17	—	—	—	—	—	—
	Winnipeg Hockey Club	MHA	3	3	2	5	—	—	—	—	—	—
1900–01	Winnipeg Hockey Club	MHA Int.	4	9	0	9	—	—	—	—	—	—
	Winnipeg Hockey Club	MHA	5	5	0	5	—	—	—	—	—	—
1901–02	Winnipeg Hockey Club	MHA	3	3	2	5	6	—	—	—	—	—
1902–03	Winnipeg Rowing Club	MHA	6	10	5	15	2	—	—	—	—	—
1903–04	Winnipeg Rowing Club	MHA	5	20	4	24	5	—	—	—	—	—
	Winnipeg Rowing Club	Stanley Cup	–	—	—	—	—	3	3	0	3	—
1904–05	Winnipeg Rowing Club	MHA	9	25	2	27	6	—	—	—	—	—
1905–06	Winnipeg Hockey Club	MHA	10	24	6	30	15	—	—	—	—	—
1906–07	Winnipeg Hockey Club	MHA	5	20	5	25	2	—	—	—	—	—
1907–08	Winnipeg Strathconas	MHL	12	24	11	35	9	—	—	—	—	—
1908–09	Winnipeg Hockey Club	MHL	1	4	2	6	0	—	—	—	—	—
MHA totals			46	110	26	136	36	–	–	–	–	—
MHL totals			13	28	13	41	9	–	–	–	–	—

*Playing stats from SIHR (Society for International Hockey Research)

== Awards and achievements ==
- Manitoba Hockey League Scoring Champion – Four times (1903, 1904, 1906 & 1907)
- "Honoured Member" of the Manitoba Hockey Hall of Fame
- Inducted to Manitoba Sports Hall of Fame
