= Winnipeg Rowing Club =

Sports club in Manitoba, Canada

Coordinates: 49.880951°N 97.131089°W

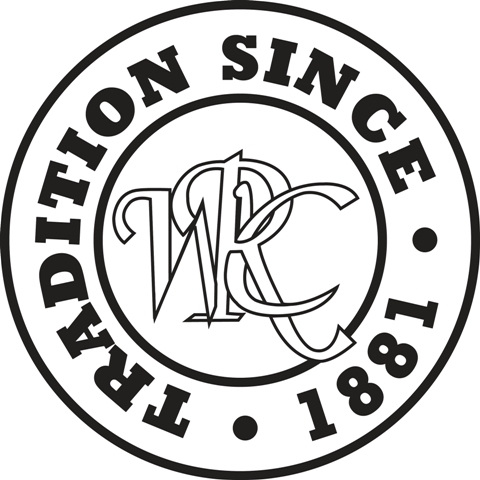

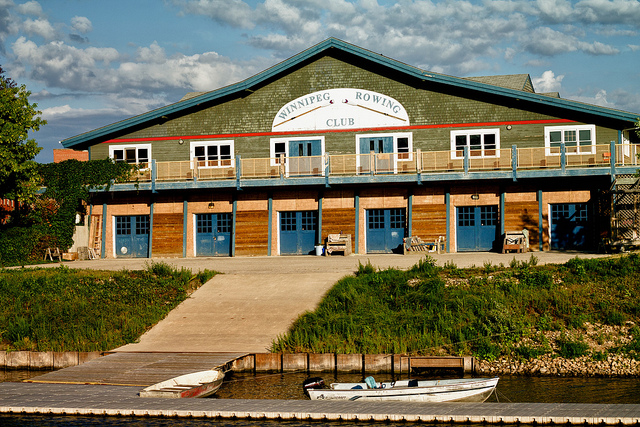

- Motto: Tradition Since 1881
- Location: 20 Lyndale Drive, Winnipeg, Manitoba, Canada
- Home water: Red River of the North
- Founded: 1881
- Affiliations: Rowing Canada, Manitoba Rowing Association, Northwestern International Rowing Association
- Website: www.winnipegrowingclub.ca

Notable members
- Bob Richards, Colleen Miller, Theo Dubois, Jeff Powell, Morgan Jarvis, Janine Hanson, Sandra Kirby, Kevin Kowalyk

Winnipeg Rowing Club football team

General information
- Founded: 1902
- Folded: 1914
- Headquartered: Winnipeg, Manitoba

League / conference affiliations
- Manitoba Rugby Football Union

Championships
- League championships: 0; 10 league championships

Winnipeg Rowing Club (WRC) is a rowing club on the Red River in downtown Winnipeg, Manitoba.

WRC provides adult and youth competitive rowing programs, and regularly sends crews to events like the Royal Canadian Henley Regatta, Western Canada Summer Games, and Canada Games. WRC also offers recreational and independent rowing.

== History ==
The Winnipeg Rowing Club was founded in 1881 by cousins John Galt II and George Galt. The club was incorporated on 2 February 1883, with Premier John Norquay as Club Patron, Thomas Renwick as president, and George Galt as Club Captain.

=== Honours ===
Henley Royal Regatta
Year	Winning crew
1910	Stewards' Challenge Cup

== Other sports ==
WRC has a history of participation in non-rowing sports and has sent teams to

- Manitoba Rugby Football Union
- Manitoba Hockey Association
- Canadian Amateur Hockey League

=== Hockey ===
From 1902 to 1906, the Winnipeg Rowing Club had an ice hockey team in the Manitoba Hockey Association. They were league champions in 1903 and 1904 and challenged the Ottawa Silver Seven for the Stanley Cup in 1904. Players on the team that challenged for the Stanley Cup include William Breen and Hockey Hall of Famer Joe Hall.

==== 1904 Stanley Cup Challenge ====
Date	Winning Team	Score	Losing Team	Location
December 30, 1903	Ottawa Senators	9–1	Winnipeg Rowing Club	Aberdeen Pavilion, Ottawa
January 1, 1904	Winnipeg Rowing Club	6–2	Ottawa	Aberdeen Pavilion, Ottawa
January 4, 1904	Ottawa Senators	2–0	Winnipeg Rowing Club	Aberdeen Pavilion, Ottawa
Ottawa wins best-of-three series 2 games to 1

===== Roster =====
- Brown, Art - goal
- Browne, Percy E. - point
- Richards, S. Crawford - cover point
- William Breen - forward (captain)
- Joe Hall - forward
- Billy Bawlf - forward
- Claude Borland - forward
- Bennest, Clint - forward
- Harry Kirby - forward

After the first game of the series, Winnipeg added Eric Werge Hamber from the Toronto Argonauts ice hockey team.
