= Cliff Roseborough =

Canadian football player

Profile
- Position: Halfback

Personal information
- Born: c. 1910; Winnipeg, Manitoba, Canada
- Died: October 12, 1984; Winnipeg, Manitoba, Canada
- Listed height: 6 ft 0 in (1.83 m)
- Listed weight: 205 lb (93 kg)

Career history
- 1932–1933: Regina Roughriders
- 1934–1942: Winnipeg Blue Bombers

Awards and highlights
- 3× Grey Cup champion (1935, 1939, 1941)

Alvin Clifford Roseborough (c. 1910 – October 12, 1984) was a Canadian professional football player who played for the Regina Roughriders and Winnipeg Blue Bombers. He won the Grey Cup with Winnipeg in 1935, 1939 and 1941. He is a member of the Blue Bombers Hall of Fame as well as the Manitoba Sports Hall of Fame. He played junior football for the Saskatoon Hilltops. After his retirement he became an official in the WIFU; he was also a founder and president (on multiple occasions) of the Manitoba Officials Association. He retired as a football official in 1964. In 1958 and 1965, he was President of the Winnipeg Blue Bomber Alumni Association. He died in 1984.
