= Norman D. Vaughan =

American dogsled driver and explorer

Colonel Norman Dane Vaughan (December 18, 1905 – December 23, 2005) was an American dogsled driver and explorer whose first claim to fame was participating in Admiral Byrd's first expedition to the South Pole. He also ran dog teams in a professional capacity as part of a search and rescue unit in World War II, in sporting events like the Olympics and the Iditarod Trail Sled Dog Race, and in three Presidential Inauguration ceremonies.

== Antarctica and World War II ==
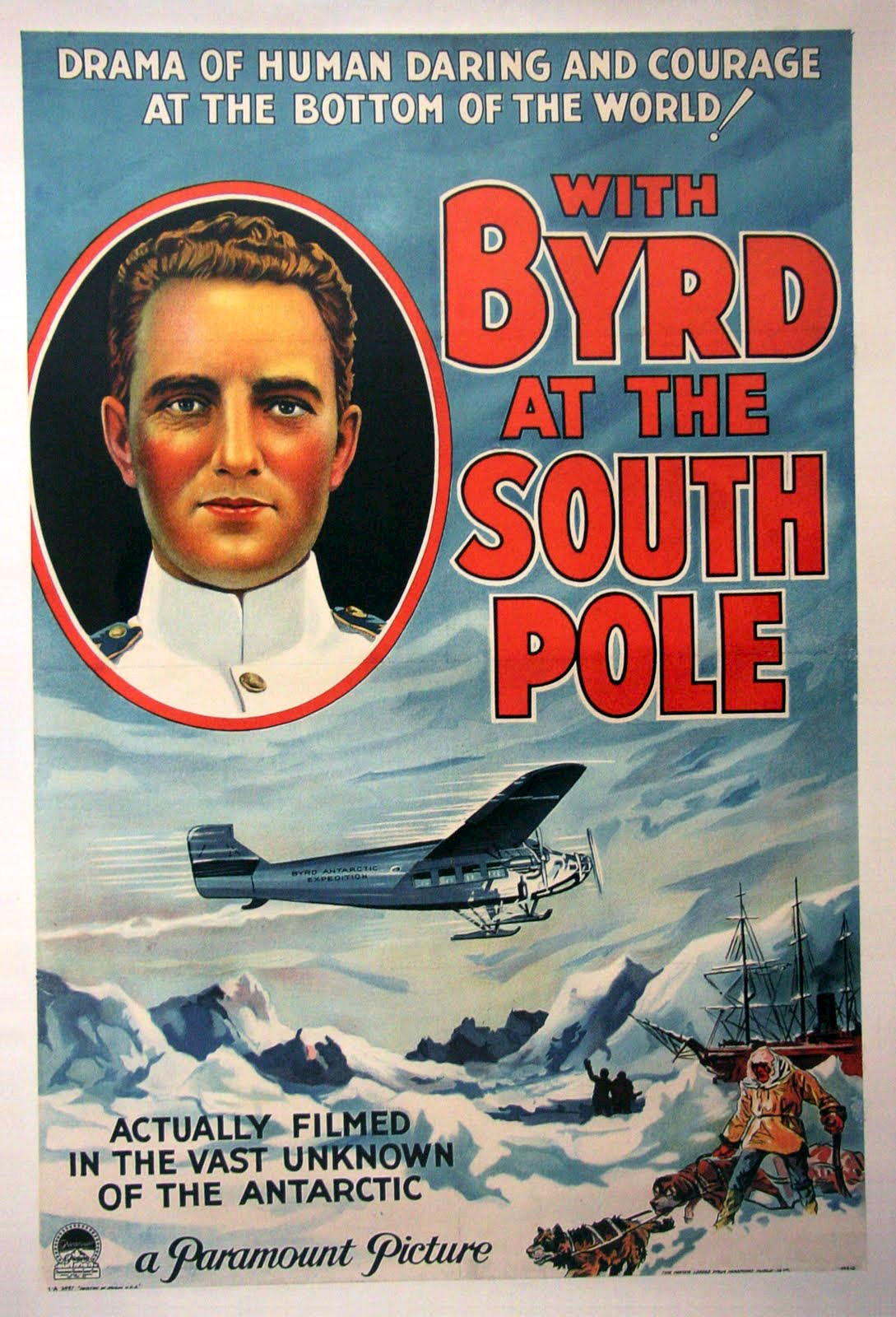
Poster for the documentary "With Byrd at the South Pole" including Norman Vaughn, 1930

Vaughan was born on December 18, 1905, in Salem, Massachusetts, as the son of a wealthy leather tanner and shoe manufacturer.

In his youth, he became fascinated by tales of early-century polar explorers. He dropped out of Harvard in 1928 when he heard that Admiral Richard E. Byrd was organizing an expedition to Antarctica. Admiral Byrd accepted him on the 1928–1930 expedition, eventually naming a mountain on the continent in his honor. Vaughan appeared in the documentary film With Byrd at the South Pole (1930).

In 1994, at the age of 88, Vaughan participated in an expedition to climb the 10,302 ft (3,150 m) Mount Vaughan. His plans to return in December 2005, to celebrate his 100th birthday, were scrapped in August due to lack of funds. A highlight of his publicity push was his appearance on The Tonight Show with Jay Leno on May 10, 2005, and a full-page article in the Los Angeles Times. He made plans to return in 2006 but these were halted by his death just six months before the scheduled date.

In 1932, he competed in the Winter Olympics in Lake Placid, New York, in the sprint mushing demonstration sport.

During World War II, Vaughan was employed by U.S. Army Air Forces Search and Rescue as a dogsled driver, attaining the rank of colonel and engaging in many rescue missions in Greenland. He was also a veteran of the Korean War.

== Alaska enthusiast ==
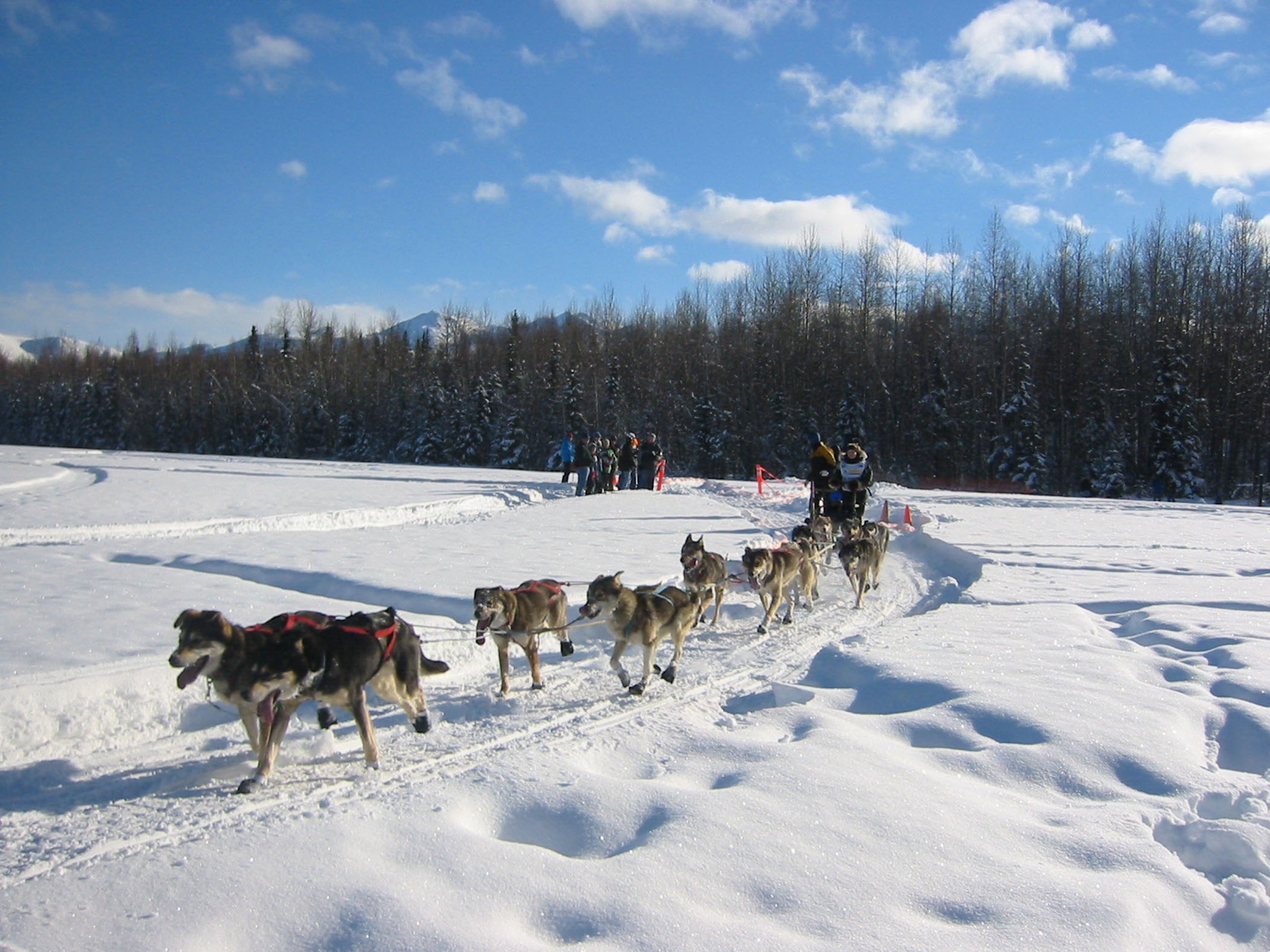
Dog musher on the Iditarod Trail

Vaughan moved to Alaska at the age of 68. Bankrupt and divorced, he rebuilt his life, competing in 13 Iditarod races and "crashing" the Presidential Inauguration parade in 1977, bringing sled dogs to represent his adopted state. In 1981 and 1985, he and his Alaskan contingent formally participated in the parade. He also had a mountain named after him in the Antarctic.

In 1997, he organized the annual Norman Vaughan Serum Run to commemorate the 1925 serum run to Nome, which saved the town from a diphtheria epidemic.

He is survived by his fourth wife, the former Carolyn Muegge, who has also raced in the Iditarod, and a son and daughter from his earlier marriages. On the celebration of his 100th birthday on December 18, 2005, surrounded by over 100 friends and family, he had champagne, his first drink of liquor in his life, after promising his mother he wouldn't drink until he was 100. Five days later he died in the Providence Alaska Medical Center in Anchorage at around 10:30 AM on December 23, 2005. His wife and some close friends were with him.
