= 1977 Montreal Alouettes season =

Canadian football team season

- Head coach: Marv Levy
- Home stadium: Olympic Stadium

Results
- Record: 11–5
- Division place: 1st, East
- Playoffs: Won Grey Cup

Uniform

The 1977 Montreal Alouettes finished the season in first place in the Eastern Conference with an 11–5 record and won the 65th Grey Cup. The Alouettes set CFL attendance records for the most attended regular season game with 69,093 fans attending the September 6 match-up with the Toronto Argonauts and for the most attended Grey Cup game with 68,205 people attending the 65th Grey Cup. Both records still stand today.

== Preseason ==
Game	Date	Opponent	Results		Venue	Attendance
Game	Date	Opponent	Score	Record	Venue	Attendance
A	June 15	at Winnipeg Blue Bombers	L 17–24	0–1	Winnipeg Stadium	17,736
B	June 26	vs. Edmonton Eskimos	L 16–18	0–2	Olympic Stadium	22,147
C	June 29	at Toronto Argonauts	W 20–6	1–2	Exhibition Stadium	39,103
D	July 5	vs. Hamilton Tiger-Cats	W 40–0	2–2	Olympic Stadium	23,920

== Regular season ==
=== Standings ===
Eastern Football Conference
Team	GP	W	L	T	PF	PA	Pts
Montreal Alouettes	16	11	5	0	311	245	22
Ottawa Rough Riders	16	8	8	0	368	344	16
Toronto Argonauts	16	6	10	0	251	266	12
Hamilton Tiger-Cats	16	5	11	0	283	394	10

=== Schedule ===
Week	Game	Date	Opponent	Results		Venue	Attendance
Week	Game	Date	Opponent	Score	Record	Venue	Attendance
1	1	July 13	at Ottawa Rough Riders	W 27–17	1–0	Lansdowne Park	25,280
2	2	July 20	at Toronto Argonauts	W 16–10	2–0	Exhibition Stadium	47,320
3	3	July 26	vs. Calgary Stampeders	W 17–6	3–0	Olympic Stadium	55,085
4	4	Aug 2	at Hamilton Tiger-Cats	W 21–11	4–0	Ivor Wynne Stadium	25,782
5	5	Aug 11	vs. Winnipeg Blue Bombers	W 27–10	5–0	Olympic Stadium	63,330
6	Bye						
7	6	Aug 23	vs. Ottawa Rough Riders	W 27–20	6–0	Olympic Stadium	66,544
8	7	Aug 30	at Edmonton Eskimos	W 25–20	7–0	Clarke Stadium	25,875
9	8	Sept 6	vs. Toronto Argonauts	L 14–20	7–1	Olympic Stadium	69,093
10	9	Sept 11	at Ottawa Rough Riders	W 16–11	8–1	Lansdowne Park	33,399
11	10	Sept 18	at Toronto Argonauts	L 13–19	8–2	Exhibition Stadium	47,138
12	11	Sept 25	at Hamilton Tiger-Cats	L 19–20	8–3	Ivor Wynne Stadium	21,748
13	12	Oct 2	vs. Toronto Argonauts	L 6–18	8–4	Olympic Stadium	62,832
14	13	Oct 9	vs. Saskatchewan Roughriders	W 20–18	9–4	Olympic Stadium	50,540
15	14	Oct 15	at BC Lions	L 17–18	9–5	Empire Stadium	32,719
16	15	Oct 22	vs. Ottawa Rough Riders	W 28–16	10–5	Olympic Stadium	62,157
17	16	Oct 29	vs. Hamilton Tiger-Cats	W 18–11	11–5	Olympic Stadium	46,620

== Postseason ==
Round	Date	Opponent	Results		Venue	Attendance
Round	Date	Opponent	Score	Record	Venue	Attendance
East Final	Nov 19	vs. Ottawa Rough Riders	W 21–18	1–0	Olympic Stadium	55,400
Grey Cup	Nov 27	vs. Edmonton Eskimos	W 41–6	2–0	Olympic Stadium	68,205

=== Grey Cup ===
Team	Q1	Q2	Q3	Q4	Total
Edmonton Eskimos	0	3	3	0	6
Montreal Alouettes	10	0	20	11	41

== Awards and honours ==
=== CFL All-Stars ===
- OT – Dan Yochum
- DT – Glen Weir
- LB – Chuck Zapiec
- DB – Dickie Harris
- DB – Randy Rhino

=== Eastern All-Stars ===
- SB – Peter Dalla Riva
- WR – Brock Aynsley
- OT – Dan Yochum
- DT – Glen Weir
- LB – Chuck Zapiec
- DB – Dickie Harris
- DB – Tony Proudfoot
- DB – Randy Rhino
- K – Don Sweet

== Roster ==
1977 Montreal Alouettes final roster
Quarterbacks: 7 Joe Barnes; 9 Gerry Dattilio; 14 Sonny Wade P; Running backs: 35 Horace Belton; 24 Andy Hopkins; 33 Chuck McMann; 30 John O'Leary; 36 Larry Smith; Wide receivers: 19 Brock Aynsley; 22 Bob Gaddis; 10 Ian Mofford; Tight ends: 74 Peter Dalla Riva	Offensive linemen: 50 Pat Bonnett G/C; 44 Wayne Conrad C/G; 65 Max Huber T/G; 55 Barry Randall T; 53 Doug Smith C; 52 Ray Watrin G/T; 67 Dan Yochum T; Defensive linemen: 77 Junior Ah You DE; 7O Clifton Alapa DE; 47 Gabriel Grégoire DE; 75 Gord Judges DT/DE; 64 Glen Weir DT	Linebackers: 39 Wally Buono P; 26 Gary Chown; 72 Carl Crennel; 66 Marvin Davis; 76 Chuck Zapiec; Defensive backs: 15 Barry Ardern; 12 John Beaton; 16 Jim Burrow; 27 Dwayne Crump; 18 Dickie Harris; 37 Vernon Perry; 23 Tony Proudfoot; 21 Randy Rhino; Special teams: 11 Don Sweet K; Italics indicate American players
