= 1977 BC Lions season =

Canadian football team season

- General manager: Bob Ackles
- Head coach: Vic Rapp
- Home stadium: Empire Stadium

Results
- Record: 10–6
- Division place: 2nd, West
- Playoffs: Lost Western Final

Uniform

The 1977 BC Lions finished in second place in the Western Conference with a 10–6 record. They appeared in the Western Final.

General Manager Bob Ackles started a complete shakeup of the organization by bringing Edmonton assistant Vic Rapp in as the 10th head coach on January 21.

Ackles also recruited Jerry Tagge, who quarterbacked the two-time NCAA champion University of Nebraska and was a high first round draft choice of the Green Bay Packers. Tagge, who never found success with Green Bay, was enticed to come up to Canada to resurrect his football career. Tagge had a solid season throwing for 2787 yards but more importantly led the Lions to 10 victories and several last-minute heroics that earned the 1977 Lions the label the "Cardiac Kids". Tagge was the western nominee for Outstanding Player, but lost out to running back JImmy Edwards of Hamilton for the Outstanding Player Award in the CFL.

Al Wilson finally won the Schenley award for Most Outstanding Offensive Lineman and receiver/return Leon Bright captured the Schenley Rookie award.

Rapp was named the Canadian Football League's Coach of the Year.

Tagge, Wilson and Bright were the 3 Lions selected to the CFL All-star team.

== Offseason ==
=== CFL draft ===
| Round | Pick | Player | Position | School |

== Preseason ==
| Game | Date | Opponent | Results | | Venue | Attendance |
| Game | Date | Opponent | Score | Record | Venue | Attendance |

== Regular season ==
=== Season standings ===
Western Football Conference
| Team | GP | W | L | T | PF | PA | Pts |
|---|---|---|---|---|---|---|---|
| Edmonton Eskimos | 16 | 10 | 6 | 0 | 412 | 320 | 20 |
| BC Lions | 16 | 10 | 6 | 0 | 369 | 326 | 20 |
| Winnipeg Blue Bombers | 16 | 10 | 6 | 0 | 382 | 336 | 20 |
| Saskatchewan Roughriders | 16 | 8 | 8 | 0 | 330 | 389 | 16 |
| Calgary Stampeders | 16 | 4 | 12 | 0 | 241 | 327 | 8 |

=== Season schedule ===
| Week | Game | Date | Opponent | Results | |
| Week | Game | Date | Opponent | Score | Record |
|---|---|---|---|---|---|
| 1 | 1 | July 12 | vs. Calgary Stampeders | W 14–9 | 1–0 |
| 2 | 2 | July 20 | at Saskatchewan Roughriders | W 34–14 | 2–0 |
| 3 | 3 | July 26 | vs. Saskatchewan Roughriders | L 5–24 | 2–1 |
| 4 | 4 | Aug 3 | at Calgary Stampeders | W 30–26 | 3–1 |
| 5 | 5 | Aug 9 | vs. Edmonton Eskimos | L 18–24 | 3–2 |
| 6 | 6 | Aug 17 | at Winnipeg Blue Bombers | W 25–17 | 4–2 |
| 7 | 7 | Aug 23 | vs. Toronto Argonauts | W 30–0 | 5–2 |
| 8 | 8 | Aug 31 | at Ottawa Rough Riders | W 27–24 | 6–2 |
| 9 | 9 | Sept 10 | vs. Calgary Stampeders | W 33–21 | 7–2 |
| 10 | 10 | Sept 17 | at Edmonton Eskimos | W 20–18 | 8–2 |
| 11 | 11 | Sept 24 | vs. Edmonton Eskimos | W 30–13 | 9–2 |
| 12 | 12 | Oct 2 | at Winnipeg Blue Bombers | L 15–19 | 9–3 |
| 13 | Bye | | | | |
| 14 | 13 | Oct 15 | vs. Montreal Alouettes | W 18–17 | 10–3 |
| 15 | 14 | Oct 23 | at Hamilton Tiger-Cats | L 21–31 | 10–4 |
| 16 | 15 | Oct 30 | at Saskatchewan Roughriders | L 28–38 | 10–5 |
| 17 | 16 | Nov 5 | vs. Winnipeg Blue Bombers | L 21–31 | 10–6 |

== Playoffs ==
=== West Semi-Final ===
| Team | Q1 | Q2 | Q3 | Q4 | Total |
|---|---|---|---|---|---|
| Winnipeg Blue Bombers | 10 | 7 | 15 | 0 | 32 |
| BC Lions | 10 | 10 | 6 | 7 | 33 |

=== West Final ===
| Team | Q1 | Q2 | Q3 | Q4 | Total |
|---|---|---|---|---|---|
| BC Lions | 0 | 1 | 0 | 0 | 1 |
| Edmonton Eskimos | 17 | 3 | 10 | 8 | 38 |

=== Offensive leaders ===
| Player | Passing yds | Rushing yds | Receiving yds | TD |
| Jerry Tagge | 2787 | 48 | 0 | 1 |
| Mike Strickland | | 751 | 382 | 6 |
| Leon Bright | | 43 | 816 | 9 |
| Jim Harrison | | 345 | 211 | 4 |
| Terry Bailey | | 54 | 558 | 3 |
| Jim Young | | 0 | 537 | 3 |
| Al Charuk | | 0 | 317 | 3 |

== Roster ==
1977 BC Lions final roster
| Quarterbacks: 7 Gary Keithley; 8 Jerry Tagge; Running backs: 36 Terry Bailey; 12 Rudy Florio; 35 Jim Harrison; 35 Leroy Moss; 4 Mike Strickland; Wide receivers: 26 Leon Bright; 25 Al Charuk; 6 John Sciarra; 30 Jim Young; Tight ends: 72 Rick Appleby; 70 Tyrone Walls | Offensive linemen: 68 John Blain G/T; 50 Gerry Inglis C; 51 Tom Kudaba G; 54 Glenn Leonhard G; 62 Layne McDowell T; 66 Al Simpson T; 64 Larry Watkins T; 52 Al Wilson C; Defensive linemen: 76 Mark Chalmers DT; 78 Frank Landy DT; 79 Jesse O'Neal DE; 67 Gary Robinson DE; 61 Doug Seymour DE/DT; 60 Don Wunderly DE/DT | Linebackers: 58 Charles Anthony; 40 Paul Giroday; 37 Glen Jackson; 44 Rob McLaren; Defensive backs: 28 Doug Carlson; 32 Grady Cavness; 27 Ted Dushinski; 14 Joe Fourqurean; 18 Ken Hinton; 16 Rocky Long; 17 Larry Uteck; 3 Hal Lund; Special teams: 5 Lui Passaglia K/P; Italics indicate International player |

== Awards and records ==
- CFL's Most Outstanding Offensive Lineman Award – Al Wilson (DE)
- CFL's Most Outstanding Rookie Award – Leon Bright (WR)

=== 1977 CFL All-Stars ===
- QB – Jerry Tagge, CFL All-Star
- WR- Leon Bright, CFL All-Star
- C – Al Wilson, CFL All-Star
