= List of Canadian Football League annual rushing leaders =

The Canadian Football League (CFL) was officially formed in 1958. Statistics for the IRFU/Eastern Division date back to 1954 whereas WIFU/Western Division statistics date back to 1950.

== Rushing yards ==
Key
Symbol	Meaning
Player	The player who recorded the most rushing yards in the league
Yds	The total number of rushing yards the player gained
†	Former league record
*	Current record
(#)	Denotes the number of times a player appears in this list

CFL annual rushing yards leaders
Season	Player	Yds	Team
1950	Tom Casey	637†	Winnipeg Blue Bombers
1951	Norman Kwong	933†	Edmonton Eskimos
1952	Johnny Bright	815	Calgary Stampeders
1953	Billy Vessels	926	Edmonton Eskimos
1954	Howard Waugh	1,043†	Calgary Stampeders
1955	Norman Kwong (2)	1,250†	Edmonton Eskimos
1956	Norman Kwong (3)	1,437†	Edmonton Eskimos
1957	Johnny Bright (2)	1,679†	Edmonton Eskimos
1958	Johnny Bright (3)	1,722†	Edmonton Eskimos
1959	Johnny Bright (4)	1,340	Edmonton Eskimos
1960	Dave Thelen	1,407	Ottawa Rough Riders
1961	Earl Lunsford	1,794†	Calgary Stampeders
1962	George Dixon	1,520	Montreal Alouettes
1963	Lovell Coleman	1,343	Calgary Stampeders
1964	Lovell Coleman (2)	1,629	Calgary Stampeders
1965	George Reed	1,768	Saskatchewan Roughriders
1966	George Reed (2)	1,409	Saskatchewan Roughriders
1967	George Reed (3)	1,471	Saskatchewan Roughriders
1968	George Reed (4)	1,222	Saskatchewan Roughriders
1969	George Reed (5)	1,353	Saskatchewan Roughriders
1970	Hugh McKinnis	1,135	Calgary Stampeders
1971	Jim Evenson	1,237	BC Lions
1972	Mack Herron	1,527	Winnipeg Blue Bombers
1973	Roy Bell	1,455	Edmonton Eskimos
1974	George Reed (6)	1,447	Saskatchewan Roughriders
1975	Willie Burden	1,896†	Calgary Stampeders
1976	Jim Washington	1,277	Winnipeg Blue Bombers
1977	Jimmy Edwards	1,581	Hamilton Tiger-Cats
1978	Mike Strickland	1,306	Saskatchewan Roughriders
1979	David Green	1,678	Montreal Alouettes
1980	James Sykes	1,263	Calgary Stampeders
1981	James Sykes (2)	1,107	Calgary Stampeders
1982	Skip Walker	1,141	Ottawa Rough Riders
1983	Skip Walker (2)	1,431	Ottawa Rough Riders
1984	Willard Reaves	1,733	Winnipeg Blue Bombers
1985	Willard Reaves (2)	1,323	Winnipeg Blue Bombers
1986	Gary Allen	1,153	Calgary Stampeders
1987	Willard Reaves (3)	1,471	Winnipeg Blue Bombers
1988	Orville Lee	1,075	Ottawa Rough Riders
1989	Reggie Taylor	1,503	Edmonton Eskimos
1990	Robert Mimbs	1,341	Winnipeg Blue Bombers
1991	Robert Mimbs (2)	1,769	Winnipeg Blue Bombers
1992	Mike Richardson	1,153	Winnipeg Blue Bombers
1993	Mike Richardson (2)	925	Winnipeg Blue Bombers
1994	Mike Pringle	1,972†	Baltimore CFLers
1995	Mike Pringle (2)	1,791	Baltimore Stallions
1996	Robert Mimbs (3)	1,403	Saskatchewan Roughriders
1997	Mike Pringle (3)	1,775	Montreal Alouettes
1998	Mike Pringle (4)	2,065*	Montreal Alouettes
1999	Mike Pringle (5)	1,656	Montreal Alouettes
2000	Mike Pringle (6)	1,778	Montreal Alouettes
2001	Michael Jenkins	1,484	Toronto Argonauts
2002	John Avery	1,448	Edmonton Eskimos
2003	Charles Roberts	1,554	Winnipeg Blue Bombers
2004	Troy Davis	1,628	Hamilton Tiger-Cats
2005	Charles Roberts (2)	1,624	Winnipeg Blue Bombers
2006	Charles Roberts (3)	1,609	Winnipeg Blue Bombers
2007	Joe Smith	1,510	BC Lions
2008	Joffrey Reynolds	1,310	Calgary Stampeders
2009	Joffrey Reynolds (2)	1,504	Calgary Stampeders
2010	Fred Reid	1,396	Winnipeg Blue Bombers
2011	Brandon Whitaker	1,381	Montreal Alouettes
2012	Jon Cornish	1,457	Calgary Stampeders
2013	Jon Cornish (2)	1,813	Calgary Stampeders
2014	Jon Cornish (3)	1,082	Calgary Stampeders
2015	Tyrell Sutton	1,059	Montreal Alouettes
2016	Jerome Messam	1,198	Saskatchewan Roughriders
2017	Andrew Harris	1,035	Winnipeg Blue Bombers
2018	Andrew Harris (2)	1,390	Winnipeg Blue Bombers
2019	Andrew Harris (3)	1,380	Winnipeg Blue Bombers
2020	Season cancelled		
2021	William Stanback	1,176	Montreal Alouettes
2022	Ka'Deem Carey	1,088	Calgary Stampeders
2023	Brady Oliveira	1,534	Winnipeg Blue Bombers
2024	Brady Oliveira (2)	1,353	Winnipeg Blue Bombers
2025	Dedrick Mills	1,409	Calgary Stampeders
2026	Brady Oliveira (3)	1,493	Winnipeg Blue Bombers

== Rushing touchdowns ==
Key
Symbol	Meaning
Player	The player who scored the most rushing touchdowns in the league
TDs	The total number of rushing touchdowns the player scored
†	Former league record
*	Current record
(#)	Denotes the number of times a player appears in this list

CFL annual rushing touchdowns leaders
Season	Player	TDs	Team
1950	Bill Gregus	10†	Hamilton Tiger-Cats
1950	Edgar Jones	10†	Hamilton Tiger-Cats
1951	Hal Waggoner	8	Hamilton Tiger-Cats
1952	Norman Kwong	8	Edmonton Eskimos
1953	Rollie Miles	8	Edmonton Eskimos
1954	Johnny Bright	10†	Edmonton Eskimos
1954	Alex Webster	10†	Montreal Alouettes
1955	Pat Abbruzzi	17†	Montreal Alouettes
1956	Pat Abbruzzi (2)	17†	Montreal Alouettes
1957	Gerry James	18†	Winnipeg Blue Bombers
1958	Norman Kwong (2)	10	Edmonton Eskimos
1959	Dave Thelen	10	Ottawa Rough Riders
1960	Ron Stewart	15	Ottawa Rough Riders
1961	Johnny Bright (2)	11	Edmonton Eskimos
1962	George Dixon	11	Montreal Alouettes
1963	Lovell Coleman	13	Calgary Stampeders
1964	Bob Swift	11	BC Lions
1965	George Reed	12	Saskatchewan Roughriders
1966	Jim Dillard	7	Ottawa Rough Riders
1966	Bill Munsey	7	BC Lions
1967	George Reed (2)	15	Saskatchewan Roughriders
1968	George Reed (3)	16	Saskatchewan Roughriders
1969	George Reed (4)	12	Saskatchewan Roughriders
1970	Hugh McKinnis	9	Calgary Stampeders
1971	George Reed (5)	12	Saskatchewan Roughriders
1972	George Reed (6)	13	Saskatchewan Roughriders
1973	George Reed (7)	12	Saskatchewan Roughriders
1974	Calvin Harrell	9	Edmonton Eskimos
1975	Art Green	11	Ottawa Rough Riders
1975	George Reed (8)	11	Saskatchewan Roughriders
1976	Art Green (2)	13	Ottawa Rough Riders
1977	Richard Holmes	10	Ottawa Rough Riders
1978	James Sykes	13	Calgary Stampeders
1979	David Green	11	Montreal Alouettes
1980	Jim Germany	10	Edmonton Eskimos
1980	James Sykes (2)	10	Calgary Stampeders
1981	Jim Germany (2)	18†	Edmonton Eskimos
1982	Skip Walker	13	Ottawa Rough Riders
1983	Skip Walker (2)	10	Ottawa Rough Riders
1984	Willard Reaves	14	Winnipeg Blue Bombers
1985	Craig Ellis	14	Saskatchewan Roughriders
1986	Bobby Johnson	12	Saskatchewan Roughriders
1987	Gill Fenerty	12	Toronto Argonauts
1988	Milson Jones	11	Saskatchewan Roughriders
1989	Blake Marshall	11	Edmonton Eskimos
1989	Derrick McAdoo	11	Hamilton Tiger-Cats
1990	Milson Jones (2)	11	Saskatchewan Roughriders
1991	Blake Marshall (2)	16	Edmonton Eskimos
1991	Jon Volpe	16	BC Lions
1992	Jon Volpe (2)	13	BC Lions
1993	Matt Dunigan	11	Winnipeg Blue Bombers
1993	Doug Flutie	11	Calgary Stampeders
1994	Tony Stewart	14	Calgary Stampeders
1995	Cory Philpot	17	BC Lions
1996	Robert Drummond	11	Toronto Argonauts
1997	Ronald Williams	16	Winnipeg Blue Bombers
1998	Ronald Williams (2)	13	Hamilton Tiger-Cats
1999	Ronald Williams (3)	14	Hamilton Tiger-Cats
2000	Mike Pringle	19*	Montreal Alouettes
2001	Mike Pringle (2)	16	Montreal Alouettes
2002	Sean Millington	14	BC Lions
2003	Mike Pringle (3)	13	Edmonton Eskimos
2004	Troy Davis	10	Hamilton Tiger-Cats
2005	Antonio Warren	13	BC Lions
2006	Robert Edwards	14	Montreal Alouettes
2007	Joe Smith	18	BC Lions
2008	Wes Cates	12	Saskatchewan Roughriders
2009	Avon Cobourne	13	Montreal Alouettes
2010	Wes Cates (2)	15	Saskatchewan Roughriders
2011	Jon Cornish	9	Calgary Stampeders
2012	Jon Cornish (2)	11	Calgary Stampeders
2012	Kory Sheets	11	Saskatchewan Roughriders
2013	Jon Cornish (3)	12	Calgary Stampeders
2013	Kory Sheets (2)	12	Saskatchewan Roughriders
2014	Drew Tate	10	Calgary Stampeders
2015	Jeremiah Johnson	9	Ottawa Redblacks
2016	Jerome Messam	11	Calgary Stampeders
2017	Michael Reilly	12	Edmonton Eskimos
2018	James Franklin	14	Toronto Argonauts
2019	Vernon Adams	12	Montreal Alouettes
2019	William Powell	12	Saskatchewan Roughriders
2019	Chris Streveler	12	Winnipeg Blue Bombers
2020	Season cancelled		
2021	Sean McGuire	8	Winnipeg Blue Bombers
2022	Caleb Evans	16	Ottawa Redblacks
2023	Dustin Crum	9	Ottawa Redblacks
2023	Brady Oliveira	9	Winnipeg Blue Bombers
2024	Tommy Stevens	10	Calgary Stampeders
2024	Chris Streveler (2)	10	Winnipeg Blue Bombers
2025	James Butler	11	BC Lions
2025	Dustin Crum (2)	11	Ottawa Redblacks
2025	Dedrick Mills	11	Calgary Stampeders
2026	Zander Horvath	18	BC Lions

== See also ==
- List of Canadian Football League annual passing leaders
- List of Canadian Football League annual receiving leaders
