= Wayne Allison (Canadian football) =

Canadian football player

Profile
- Position: Defensive back

Personal information
- Born: December 17, 1949; Toronto, Ontario, Canada
- Died: October 24, 2005 (aged 55)
- Listed height: 5 ft 11 in (1.80 m)
- Listed weight: 185 lb (84 kg)

Career information
- University: Waterloo Lutheran
- CFL draft: 1973: 1st round, 9th overall pick

Career history
- 1973–1977: Toronto Argonauts
- 1977: Calgary Stampeders
- 1978: Winnipeg Blue Bombers
- 1978–1979: Toronto Argonauts

Wayne Allison (December 17, 1949 – October 24, 2005) was a Canadian professional football defensive back who played for the Toronto Argonauts, Calgary Stampeders, and Winnipeg Blue Bombers of the Canadian Football League (CFL). From 1973 to 1978, Allison played in 85 regular season games in the CFL.

Allison played for the Waterloo Lutheran Golden Hawks in college as a quarterback, where he led his team to play in the 8th Vanier Cup. After being drafted in the first round of the 1973 CFL draft and traded to the Toronto Argonauts, he was converted to a defensive back. Over the course of his professional career, Allison made seven interceptions, recovered five fumbles, and contributed on special teams, both as a blocker and a return specialist.

== College career ==
Allison played college football for the Waterloo Lutheran Golden Hawks as a quarterback. By his final year with the Golden Hawks in 1972, Allison was known as a dual-threat quarterback who frequently utilized triple option running plays out of the wishbone formation. He led the Golden Hawks to victories in the Yates Cup game and the Atlantic Bowl as a senior. The Golden Hawks then played in the 8th Vanier Cup (then known as the College Bowl), losing 7–20 to the Alberta Golden Bears.

== Professional career ==
The Edmonton Eskimos selected Allison in the first round of the 1973 CFL draft with the ninth overall pick. Shortly after in May 1973, the Eskimos traded Allison to the Toronto Argonauts, who gave up tight end Tony Moro in the deal. By June, the Argonauts decided to convert Allison to a defensive back, the position he went on to play for his entire professional career. Allison played in 14 regular season games for the Argonauts in 1973.

In 1974, Allison played in all 16 regular season games. In an August 21 game against the Winnipeg Blue Bombers, Allison attempted to punt the ball out of the endzone in the last play of the game to prevent the Blue Bombers from scoring a single. The punt was blocked and recovered for a touchdown, resulting in an 18–13 Blue Bombers win. Ottawa Rough Riders head coach George Brancato credited Allison with "turn[ing] the game around" for the Argonauts in a 19–7 win against Ottawa on September 29, after Allison returned an interception roughly 55 yards to set up an Argonauts touchdown drive. In addition to his role on defense, Allison began returning punts regularly. He returned 62 punts for 318 yards on the season.

Before the 1975 season, the CFL implemented a rule change allowing the return team to block on punts. Allison was used on special teams as a blocker under this new rule. He continued his role as an occasional punt returner with 24 returns. Allison also continued to contribute defensively, playing in all 16 regular season games and recording an interception and fumble recovery.

In 1976, Allison made two interceptions while playing in all 16 regular season games. He faced a reduced role on special teams, with no punt or kick returns on the season for the first time since he joined the league. While Allison was not named an all-star for the 1976 season, he was invited to play in the CFL All-Star Game as a replacement for all-stars which were unable to play.

When wide receiver Kelvin Kirk suffered a concussion in a July 1977 game against the Ottawa Rough Riders, Allison was forced to substitute as a wide receiver. After playing five regular season games with the Argonauts in 1977, Allison was traded to the Calgary Stampeders for Rudy Linterman. He played in four games for the Stampeders during the 1977 season. Allison tore his Achilles tendon in September when he was hit while standing on the sideline, and the injury ended his season.

Before the 1978 season, the Stampeders traded Allison to the Winnipeg Blue Bombers for wide receiver Rick Koswina. Allison played in nine regular season games for the Blue Bombers recording one fumble recovery before being released. He was then picked up by his original team, the Toronto Argonauts, in October 1978. Allison finished the 1978 season with the Argonauts, playing in five more games, before being cut in June 1979.

=== Season statistics ===
			Defense		Receiving					Punt returns					Kick returns					Misc
Year	Team	GP	FR	Int	Rec	Yds	Avg	Long	TD	PR	Yds	Avg	Long	TD	KR	Yds	Avg	Long	TD	Fumbles
1973	TOR	14	1	1	0	0	0.0	0	0	4	35	8.8	13	0	8	175	21.9	27	0	2
1974	TOR	16	1	2	0	0	0.0	0	0	62	318	5.1	19	0	0	0	0.0	0	0	1
1975	TOR	16	1	1	0	0	0.0	0	0	24	222	9.3	30	0	0	0	0.0	0	0	0
1976	TOR	16	0	2	0	0	0.0	0	0	0	0	0.0	0	0	0	0	0.0	0	0	0
1977	TOR	5	0	0	1	14	14.0	14	0	0	0	0.0	0	0	0	0	0.0	0	0	0
1977	CAL	4	0	1	0	0	0.0	0	0	10	94	9.4	24	0	0	0	0.0	0	0	0
1978	WPG	9	1	0	0	0	0.0	0	0	0	0	0.0	0	0	0	0	0.0	0	0	0
1978	TOR	5	1	0	0	0	0.0	0	0	0	0	0.0	0	0	1	15	15.0	15	0	0
Total		85	5	7	1	14	14.0	14	0	100	669	6.7	30	0	9	190	21.1	27	0	3

== Death ==
On October 24, 2005, Allison died in a car accident on Ontario Highway 12.
