= James P. McCaffrey Trophy =

Canadian Football League trophy

James P. McCaffery Trophy
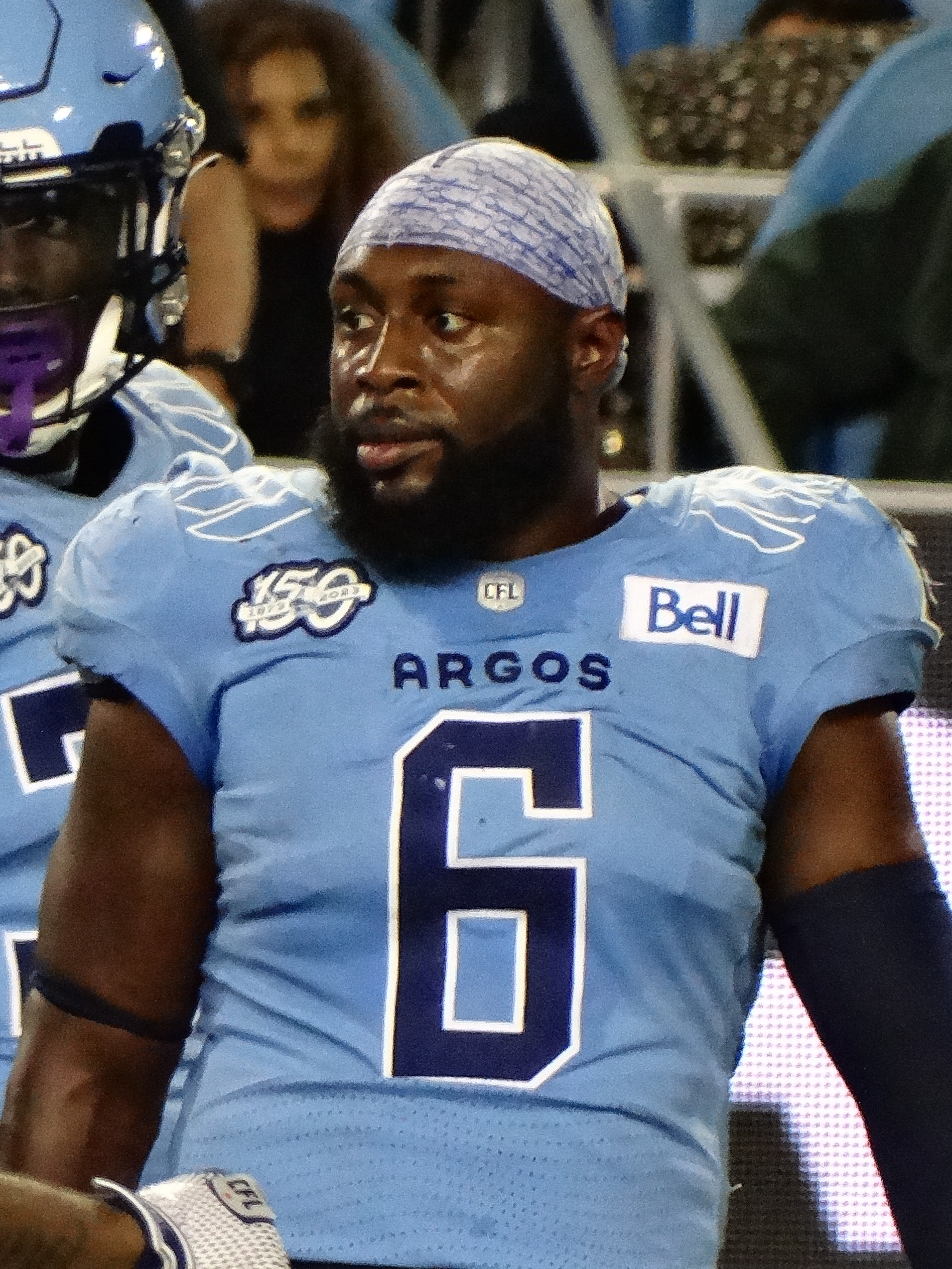
- Adarius Pickett, the 2023 recipient
- League: Canadian Football League
- Awarded for: Being the most outstanding defensive player in the East Division of the CFL
- Country: Canada

History
- First award: 1975; 51 years ago
- Editions: 48
- First winner: Jim Corrigall
- Most wins: Greg Battle; Joe Montford; Simoni Lawrence (3 wins)
- Most recent: Adarius Pickett
- Website: cfl.ca

The James P. McCaffrey Trophy is a Canadian Football League trophy, awarded to the outstanding defensive player in the East Division. Each team in the East division nominates a candidate, from which the winner is chosen. Either the winner of this trophy or the winner of the Norm Fieldgate Trophy will also win the Canadian Football League Most Outstanding Defensive Player award.

In 1995, as part of the American expansion, the McCaffrey trophy was given to the most outstanding defensive player in the South Division.

Prior to 1974 the CFL's Most Outstanding Lineman Award was awarded to both outstanding defensive players and outstanding linemen in the East Division.

== James P. McCaffrey Trophy winners ==
Year	Player	Position	Club	Ref.
2025	Julian Howsare	(DE)	Hamilton Tiger-Cats	
2024	Tyrice Beverette	(LB)	Montreal Alouettes	
2023	Adarius Pickett	(DB)	Toronto Argonauts	
2022	Lorenzo Mauldin	(DE)	Ottawa Redblacks	
2021	Simoni Lawrence	(LB)	Hamilton Tiger-Cats	
2020	N/A	N/A	N/A	N/A
2019	Simoni Lawrence	(LB)	Hamilton Tiger-Cats	
2018	Larry Dean	(LB)	Hamilton Tiger-Cats	
2017	Kyries Hebert	(LB)	Montreal Alouettes	
2016	Bear Woods	(LB)	Montreal Alouettes	
2015	Simoni Lawrence	(LB)	Hamilton Tiger-Cats	
2014	Bear Woods	(LB)	Montreal Alouettes	
2013	Chip Cox	(LB)	Montreal Alouettes	
2012	Shea Emry	(LB)	Montreal Alouettes	
2011	Jovon Johnson	(DB)	Winnipeg Blue Bombers	
2010	Markeith Knowlton	(LB)	Hamilton Tiger-Cats	
2009	Anwar Stewart	(DE)	Montreal Alouettes	
2008	Doug Brown	(DT)	Winnipeg Blue Bombers	
2007	Jonathan Brown	(DE)	Toronto Argonauts	
2006	Barrin Simpson	(LB)	Winnipeg Blue Bombers	
2005	Michael Fletcher	(LB)	Toronto Argonauts	
2004	Anwar Stewart	(DE)	Montreal Alouettes	
2003	Kevin Johnson	(LB)	Montreal Alouettes	
2002	Barron Miles	(DB)	Montreal Alouettes	
2001	Joe Montford	(DE)	Hamilton Tiger-Cats	
2000	Joe Montford	(DE)	Hamilton Tiger-Cats	
1999	Calvin Tiggle	(LB)	Hamilton Tiger-Cats	
1998	Joe Montford	(DE)	Hamilton Tiger-Cats	
1997	Shonte Peoples	(LB)	Winnipeg Blue Bombers	
1996	Tracy Gravely	(LB)	Montreal Alouettes	
1995	Tim Cofield	(DE)	Memphis Mad Dogs	
1994	Tim Cofield	(DE)	Hamilton Tiger-Cats	
1993	Elfrid Payton	(LB)	Winnipeg Blue Bombers	
1992	Angelo Snipes	(LB)	Ottawa Rough Riders	
1991	Greg Battle	(LB)	Winnipeg Blue Bombers	
1990	Greg Battle	(LB)	Winnipeg Blue Bombers	
1989	Greg Battle	(LB)	Winnipeg Blue Bombers	
1988	Grover Covington	(DE)	Hamilton Tiger-Cats	
1987	James West	(LB)	Winnipeg Blue Bombers	
1986	Brett Williams	(DT)	Montreal Alouettes	
1985	Paul Bennett	(DB)	Hamilton Tiger-Cats	
1984	Harry Skipper	(DB)	Montreal Concordes	
1983	Greg Marshall	(DE)	Ottawa Rough Riders	
1982	Zac Henderson	(DB)	Toronto Argonauts	
1981	Ben Zambiasi	(LB)	Hamilton Tiger-Cats	
1980	Tom Cousineau	(LB)	Montreal Alouettes	
1979	Ben Zambiasi	(LB)	Hamilton Tiger-Cats	
1978	Randy Rhino	(DB)	Montreal Alouettes	
1977	Glen Weir	(DT)	Montreal Alouettes	
1976	Granville Liggins	(DT)	Toronto Argonauts	
1975	Jim Corrigall	(DE)	Toronto Argonauts	

== Outstanding Defensive player in the East Division prior to the trophy ==
Year	Player	Position	Club	Ref.
1974	Ed George	(OG)	Montreal Alouettes	

== CFL's Most Outstanding Lineman Award in the East Division prior to 1974 ==
Year	Player	Position	Club	Ref.
1973	Ed George	(OG)	Montreal Alouettes	
1972	Jim Stillwagon	(DL)	Toronto Argonauts	
1971	Mark Kosmos	(LB)	Montreal Alouettes	
1970	Angelo Mosca	(DL)	Hamilton Tiger-Cats	
1969	Billy Joe Booth	(DE)	Ottawa Rough Riders	
1968	Ken Lehmann	(LB)	Ottawa Rough Riders	
1967	John Barrow	(DL)	Hamilton Tiger-Cats	
1966	Ken Lehmann	(LB)	Ottawa Rough Riders	
1965	John Barrow	(DL)	Hamilton Tiger-Cats	
1964	John Barrow	(DL)	Hamilton Tiger-Cats	
1963	Angelo Mosca	(DL)	Hamilton Tiger-Cats	
1962	John Barrow	(DL)	Hamilton Tiger-Cats	
1961	John Barrow	(DL)	Hamilton Tiger-Cats	
1960	Kaye Vaughan	(OT)	Ottawa Rough Riders	
1959	John Barrow	(DL)	Hamilton Tiger-Cats	
1958	Jackie Simpson	(OG)	Montreal Alouettes	
1957	Kaye Vaughan	(OT)	Ottawa Rough Riders	
1956	Kaye Vaughan	(OT)	Ottawa Rough Riders	
1955	Tex Coulter	(OL)	Montreal Alouettes	

== General References ==
Daniel, Steve; Krever, Jeff (eds.). 2023 CFL Guide and Record Book (PDF). Canadian Football League. p. 279. ISSN 2371-2422.
