= 1977 Ottawa Rough Riders season =

Canadian football team season

- Owner: Allan Waters
- General manager: Frank Clair
- Head coach: George Brancato
- Home stadium: Lansdowne Park

Results
- Record: 8–8
- Division place: 2nd, East
- Playoffs: Lost Eastern Final

Uniform

The 1977 Ottawa Rough Riders finished in second place in the Eastern Conference with an 8–8 record. Richard Holmes became the first player in CFL history to rush for 1,000 yards with two different teams. He rushed for 1016 yards while playing for the Argonauts and the Ottawa Rough Riders.

== Preseason ==
Week	Date	Opponent	Results		Venue	Attendance
Week	Date	Opponent	Score	Record	Venue	Attendance
A	June 14	vs. Toronto Argonauts	T 7–7	0–0–1		
A	June 18	at Edmonton Eskimos	L 24–27	0–1–1		
C	June 28	vs. Hamilton Tiger-Cats	W 36–20	1–1–1		
D	July 7	at Toronto Argonauts	L 6–28	1–2–1		

== Regular season ==
=== Standings ===
Eastern Football Conference
Team	GP	W	L	T	PF	PA	Pts
Montreal Alouettes	16	11	5	0	311	245	22
Ottawa Rough Riders	16	8	8	0	368	344	16
Toronto Argonauts	16	6	10	0	251	266	12
Hamilton Tiger-Cats	16	5	11	0	283	394	10

=== Schedule ===
Week	Game	Date	Opponent	Results		Venue	Attendance
Week	Game	Date	Opponent	Score	Record	Venue	Attendance
1	1	July 13	vs. Montreal Alouettes	L 17–27	0–1		
2	Bye						
3	2	July 27	at Toronto Argonauts	L 1–17	0–2		
4	3	Aug 3	vs. Toronto Argonauts	W 41–11	1–2		
5	4	Aug 9	at Saskatchewan Roughriders	L 17–27	1–3		
6	5	Aug 16	vs. Hamilton Tiger-Cats	W 31–17	2–3		
7	6	Aug 23	at Montreal Alouettes	L 20–27	2–4		
8	7	Aug 31	vs. BC Lions	L 24–27	2–5		
8	8	Sept 5	at Hamilton Tiger-Cats	W 33–18	3–5		
9	9	Sept 11	vs. Montreal Alouettes	L 11–16	3–6		
10	Bye						
11	10	Sept 24	at Winnipeg Blue Bombers	L 24–36	3–7		
12	11	Oct 1	vs. Edmonton Eskimos	W 34–17	4–7		
13	12	Oct 8	at Calgary Stampeders	W 27–17	5–7		
14	13	Oct 15	vs. Hamilton Tiger-Cats	W 36–26	6–7		
15	14	Oct 22	at Montreal Alouettes	L 16–28	6–8		
16	15	Oct 30	vs. Toronto Argonauts	W 14–4	7–8		
17	16	Nov 6	at Hamilton Tiger-Cats	W 25–24	8–8		

=== Postseason ===
Round	Date	Opponent	Results		Venue	Attendance
Round	Date	Opponent	Score	Record	Venue	Attendance
East Semi-Final	Nov 13	vs. Toronto Argonauts	W 21–16	1–0		
East Final	Nov 19	at Montreal Alouettes	L 18–21	1–1		

== Player stats ==
=== Passing ===
Player	Attempts	Completions	Percentage	Yards	Touchdowns	Interceptions
Tom Clements	298	182	61.0	2804	16	
Condredge Holloway	102	62	60.8	972	5	5

=== Receiving ===
Player	Games Played	Receptions	Yards	Average	Long	Touchdowns
Jeff Avery	12	34	625	18.4	82	4
Tony Gabriel	16	65	1362	21.0	75	8

=== Rushing ===
Player	Games Played	Rushes	Yards	Avg.	Touchdowns
Greg Woods	3	4	18	4.5	1

== Roster ==
1977 Ottawa Rough Riders final roster
Quarterbacks: 2 Tom Clements; 7 Condredge Holloway; Running backs: 32 Larry Cates DB; 9 Jim Foley; 28 Richard Holmes; 30 Mike Murphy; Wide receivers: 18 Jeff Avery P; 16 Bill Hatanaka; 24 Ross Clarkson; 71 Gerry Organ K/P; 1 Len Platt; Tight ends: 77 Tony Gabriel	Offensive linemen: 61 Charlie Brandon G/T; 60 Jim Coode T; 58 Doug McGee G; 56 Frank Pomarico G; 64 Donn Smith C; 67 Jeff Turcotte T; Defensive linemen: 68 Mike Fanucci DE; 53 Brian Hedges DT; 57 Kenny Moore DE; 73 Jim Piaskoski DE; 66 Claude Pilon DE/DT; 79 Mike Raines DT; 69 Mike Riley DT	Linebackers: 41 Tim Berryman; 76 John Glassford; 34 Mike Widger; Defensive backs: 21 Larry Brune; 13 Al Brenner; 10 Peter Crepin; 14 Jim Elder; 27 Mike Mitchell; 31 Wonder Monds; 22 Mike Nelms; 23 Pete Stenerson; 17 Wayne Tosh; Special teams: 14 Gerald Kunyk P; Italics indicate International player

== Awards and honours ==
- CFL's Most Outstanding Canadian Award – Tony Gabriel (TE)
- Tom Clements, All-Eastern Quarterback
- Tony Gabriel, Tight End, CFL All-Star
- Jeff Turcotte, Guard, CFL All-Star
- Mike Widger, Linebacker, CFL All-Star
