= 1977 Toronto Argonauts season =

CFL team season

- Head coach: Leo Cahill
- Home stadium: Exhibition Stadium

Results
- Record: 6–10
- Division place: 3rd, East
- Playoffs: Lost Eastern Semi-Final

Uniform

The 1977 Toronto Argonauts finished in third place in the Eastern Conference with a 6–10 record. They appeared in the Eastern Semi-Final. Richard Holmes became the first player in CFL history to rush for 1,000 yards with two different teams. He rushed for 1016 yards while playing for the Argonauts and the Ottawa Rough Riders.

== Offseason ==
=== CFL draft ===
The Toronto Argonauts drafted the following players in the 1977 CFL draft.

Round	Pick	Player	Position	School
T	T	Paul Bennett	Defensive tackle	Wilfrid Laurier
T	T	Mark Bragagnolo	Tailback	Toronto
1	2	Rick Sowieta	Linebacker	Richmond
2	11	Cliff Pelham	Defensive back	Dalhousie
3	20	Al MacLean	Guard	Bishop's
4	29	Brian Anderson	Center	Guelph
5	38	David Bossey	Linebacker	Notre Dame
6	47	Hugh Fraser	Wide receiver	Ottawa
7	56	Greg Mosher	Defensive back	Dalhousie
8	65	Tom Arnott	Defensive tackle	Guelph
9	74	Sam Sinopoli	Tight end	Toronto
10	83	John Vernon	Linebacker	Toronto

== Regular season ==
=== Standings ===
Eastern Football Conference
Team	GP	W	L	T	PF	PA	Pts
Montreal Alouettes	16	11	5	0	311	245	22
Ottawa Rough Riders	16	8	8	0	368	344	16
Toronto Argonauts	16	6	10	0	251	266	12
Hamilton Tiger-Cats	16	5	11	0	283	394	10

=== Schedule ===
Week	Date	Opponent	Results		Venue	Attendance
Week	Date	Opponent	Score	Record	Venue	Attendance
1	July 12	at Hamilton Tiger-Cats	L 20–21	0–1	Ivor Wynne Stadium	27,502
2	July 20	vs. Montreal Alouettes	L 10–16	0–2	Exhibition Stadium	47,320
3	July 27	vs. Ottawa Rough Riders	W 17–1	1–2	Exhibition Stadium	45,540
4	Aug 3	at Ottawa Rough Riders	L 11–41	1–3	Landsdowne Park	27,643
5	Aug 10	vs. Hamilton Tiger-Cats	W 22–1	2–3	Exhibition Stadium	48,120
6	Aug 17	vs. Saskatchewan Roughriders	L 26–27	2–4	Exhibition Stadium	49,714
7	Aug 23	at BC Lions	L 0–30	2–5	Empire Stadium	24,873
8	Bye					
9	Sept 6	at Montreal Alouettes	W 20–14	3–5	Olympic Stadium	69,093
9	Sept 10	vs. Hamilton Tiger-Cats	L 12–25	3–6	Exhibition Stadium	47,498
10	Sept 18	vs. Montreal Alouettes	W 19–13	4–6	Exhibition Stadium	47,138
11	Bye					
12	Oct 2	at Montreal Alouettes	W 18–6	5–6	Olympic Stadium	62,832
13	Oct 10	at Hamilton Tiger-Cats	W 43–2	6–6	Ivor Wynne Stadium	34,390
14	Oct 16	vs. Winnipeg Blue Bombers	L 10–29	6–7	Exhibition Stadium	49,242
15	Oct 23	at Edmonton Eskimos	L 12–16	6–8	Clarke Stadium	25,388
16	Oct 30	at Ottawa Rough Riders	L 4–14	6–9	Landsdowne Park	31,365
17	Nov 5	vs. Calgary Stampeders	L 7–10	6–10	Exhibition Stadium	40,474

== Postseason ==
Round	Date	Opponent	Results		Venue	Attendance
Round	Date	Opponent	Score	Record	Venue	Attendance
East Semi-Final	Sun, Nov 13	at Ottawa Rough Riders	L 16–21	0–1	Landsdowne Park	24,875

== Roster ==
1977 Toronto Argonauts final roster
Quarterbacks: 18 Chuck Ealey; 12 Clint Longley; 10 George Mira; Running backs: 24 Mark Bragagnolo; 8 Rudy Linterman; 32 Neil Lumsden P; Wide receivers: 3 Peter Gabriel; 14 Kelvin Kirk; 21 Slade Willis; Tight ends: 72 Peter Muller	Offensive linemen: 65 Nick Bastaja G; 50 Gene Clark G/T; 58 Stew Francis G/C; 52 Alan MacLean C; 59 Bryan McLaughlin G/T; 54 Joel Parrish G; 68 Peter Sorenson T; 66 Mike Wilson T; Defensive linemen: 62 Ecomet Burley DT; 79 Jim Corrigall DE; 51 Granville Liggins DT; 42 Doug MacIver DT/DE; 61 Bruce Smith DT/DE; 77 Wayne Smith DE	Linebackers: 44 Larry Brane; 17 Gordie Knowlton RB; 57 Ray Nettles; 73 Rick Sowieta; Defensive backs: 20 Paul Bennett; 16 Eric Harris; 6 Andre Johnson; 23 Mike Logan; 15 Jim Marshall; 27 Lorne Richardson; 29 David Thomas; 26 Ike Thomas; Special teams: 19 Zenon Andrusyshyn K/P; Italics indicate International player
