= 1977 Calgary Stampeders season =

Canadian football team season

- General manager: Jack Gotta
- Head coach: Jack Gotta
- Home stadium: McMahon Stadium

Results
- Record: 4–12
- Division place: 5th, West
- Playoffs: did not qualify

The 1977 Calgary Stampeders finished in fifth place in the Western Conference with a 4–12 record and failed to make the playoffs.

== Regular season ==
=== Season standings ===
Western Football Conference
Team	GP	W	L	T	PF	PA	Pts
Edmonton Eskimos	16	10	6	0	412	320	20
BC Lions	16	10	6	0	369	326	20
Winnipeg Blue Bombers	16	10	6	0	382	336	20
Saskatchewan Roughriders	16	8	8	0	330	389	16
Calgary Stampeders	16	4	12	0	241	327	8

=== Season schedule ===
Week	Game	Date	Opponent	Results		Venue	Attendance
Week	Game	Date	Opponent	Score	Record	Venue	Attendance
	1		BC Lions	L 9–14	0–1		
	2		Hamilton Tiger-Cats	W 13–11	1–1		
	3		Montreal Alouettes	L 6–17	1–2		
	4		BC Lions	L 26–30	1–3		
	5		Edmonton Eskimos	L 19–32	1–4		
	6		Winnipeg Blue Bombers	L 12–35	1–5		
	7		Saskatchewan Roughriders	L 19–30	1–6		
	8		Edmonton Eskimos	L 8–22	1–7		
	9		BC Lions	L 21–33	1–8		
	10		Winnipeg Blue Bombers	W 16–10	2–8		
	11		Saskatchewan Roughriders	W 11–1	3–8		
	12		Saskatchewan Roughriders	L 17–19	3–9		
	13		Ottawa Rough Riders	L 20–24	3–10		
	14		Winnipeg Blue Bombers	L 13–19	3–11		
	15		Edmonton Eskimos	L 21–23	3–12		
	16		Toronto Argonauts	W 10–7	4–12		

== Roster ==
1977 Calgary Stampeders final roster
Quarterbacks: 16 John Hufnagel; 25 Matthew Reed; Running backs: 10 Willie Burden; 11 Joe Colvey; 28 Bobby Joe Easter; Wide receivers: 22 Tom Forzani; 12 Brian Gervais K; 19 Larry Leathem; 21 Alex Morris; Tight ends: 70 Bob Viccars	Offensive linemen: 45 Basil Bark C; 66 Lloyd Fairbanks T; 57 Harry Holton T; 67 Jody Medford T; 62 Geary Murdock G; 61 Willie Thomas G; 46 Larry Tittley C; Defensive linemen: 77 John Helton DT/DE; 47 Andy Jonassen DE; 60 Reggie Lewis DE; 64 Ed McAleney DT; 63 Lorne Sherbina DT; Special teams: 20 Cyril McFall K	Linebackers: 76 Jim Baker; 50 Ollie Bakken; 75 Blain Lamoureaux; 31 John Palazeti FB; 34 Bill Palmer P; Defensive backs: 27 Al Burleson; 33 Doug Falconer; 7 Robin Harber; 28 Terry Irvin; 17 Andre Johnson; 23 Dennis Meyer; 32 Ray Odums; 26 Rod Woodward	Injured list: 9 Wayne Allison DB; 18 Willie Armstead WR; Italics indicate International player

== Awards and records ==
=== 1977 CFL All-Stars ===
- WR – Tom Forzani, CFL All-Star
