= 1977 Hamilton Tiger-Cats season =

Season of Canadian Football League team the Hamilton Tiger-Cats

- Head coach: Bob Shaw
- Home stadium: Ivor Wynne Stadium

Results
- Record: 5–11
- Division place: 4th, East
- Playoffs: Did not qualify
- Team MOP: Jimmy Edwards
- Team MOC: Ken Clark
- Team MOR: John Martini

The 1977 Hamilton Tiger-Cats season was the 20th season for the team in the Canadian Football League (CFL) and their 28th overall. The Tiger-Cats finished in fourth place in the Eastern Conference with a 5–11 record and missed the playoffs. Frank M.Gibson would be in his final season as the Secretary-Treasurer of the Tiger-Cats. A trophy, bearing his name, was instituted by the CFL in 1977 recognizing the Outstanding Rookie in the Eastern Division. Coming off a season as Toronto's outstanding defensive player, he was also an Eastern Football Conference All-Star in 1977.

== Regular season ==
=== Season standings ===
Eastern Football Conference
Team	GP	W	L	T	PF	PA	Pts
Montreal Alouettes	16	11	5	0	311	245	22
Ottawa Rough Riders	16	8	8	0	368	344	16
Toronto Argonauts	16	6	10	0	251	266	12
Hamilton Tiger-Cats	16	5	11	0	283	394	10

=== Season schedule ===
Week	Game	Date	Opponent	Results		Venue	Attendance
Week	Game	Date	Opponent	Score	Record	Venue	Attendance
1	1	July 12	vs. Toronto Argonauts	W 21–20	1–0		
2	2	July 19	at Calgary Stampeders	L 11–13	1–1		
3	Bye						
4	3	Aug 2	vs. Montreal Alouettes	L 11–21	1–2		
5	4	Aug 10	at Toronto Argonauts	L 1–22	1–3		
6	5	Aug 16	at Ottawa Rough Riders	L 17–31	1–4		
7	6	Aug 24	vs. Edmonton Eskimos	W 27–22	2–4		
8	7	Aug 30	at Winnipeg Blue Bombers	L 19–20	2–5		
8	8	Sept 5	vs. Ottawa Rough Riders	L 18–33	2–6		
9	9	Sept 10	at Toronto Argonauts	W 25–12	3–6		
10	10	Sept 18	at Saskatchewan Roughriders	L 17–38	3–7		
11	11	Sept 25	vs. Montreal Alouettes	W 20–19	4–7		
12	12	Oct 10	vs. Toronto Argonauts	L 2–43	4–8		
13	13	Oct 15	at Ottawa Rough Riders	L 28–36	4–9		
14	14	Oct 23	vs. BC Lions	W 31–21	5–9		
15	15	Oct 29	at Montreal Alouettes	L 11–18	5–10		
16	16	Nov 6	vs. Ottawa Rough Riders	L 24–25	5–11		

=== Awards and honours ===
- CFL's Most Outstanding Player Award – Jimmy Edwards (RB)
- Tommy Joe Coffey was Elected into the Canadian Football Hall of Fame as a Player on, June 25, 1977.

== Roster ==
1977 Hamilton Tiger-Cats final roster
Quarterbacks: 10 Jimmy Jones; 11 Tom Shuman; Running backs: 20 Jimmy Edwards; 36 Bill Harrison; 30 John Harvey; 27 John Kinch; 32 Doyle Orange; 18 Paul Whaley; Wide receivers: 13 Ken Clark P; 7 M. L. Harris; 70 Kerry Smith; Tight ends: 77 Lawrie Skolrood	Offensive linemen: 68 Larry Butler G; 66 Darryl Craig G; 54 Bart Evans G; 59 Gary Krahn G; 56 Alan Moffat T/DT; 50 Henry Waszczuk C; 67 Mike Wilson T; Defensive linemen: 63 Marv Allemang DE; 71 Al Romano DE/DT; 62 Mike Samples DT; 58 David Tipton DT; 60 Angelo Wells DE	Linebackers: 47 Sam Britts; 45 Byron Hemingway; 42 John Martini; 43 Tom Perko; Defensive backs: 16 Bill Armstrong; 19 Dan Bovair; 29 Don Bowman; 28 Barry Finlay; 21 Steve Gelley; 14 Jim Harris; 24 Lewis Porter; 37 David Shaw; 17 Gary Shaw; Special teams: 3 Nick Jambrosic K; Italics indicate American players
