= Rob McLaren =

Canadian football player

Profile
- Position: Linebacker

Personal information
- Born: March 7, 1948 (age 78); Vancouver, British Columbia
- Listed height: 6 ft 1 in (1.85 m)
- Listed weight: 255 lb (116 kg)

Career information
- University: Simon Fraser

Career history
- 1969–1973: Winnipeg Blue Bombers
- 1974–1975: Edmonton Eskimos
- 1976: Hamilton Tiger-Cats
- 1976: Edmonton Eskimos
- 1977: BC Lions

Awards and highlights
- Grey Cup champion (1975)

Rob McLaren (born March 7, 1948) is a retired Canadian football player who played for the Edmonton Eskimos, Winnipeg Blue Bombers, Hamilton Tiger-Cats and BC Lions of the Canadian Football League (CFL). He played college football at Simon Fraser University.
