= Paul Williams (Canadian football) =

American gridiron football player (born 1947)

No. 27, 29
- Position: Defensive back

Personal information
- Born: January 29, 1947 (age 79)
- Listed height: 5 ft 11 in (1.80 m)
- Listed weight: 195 lb (88 kg)

Career information
- College: California at Berkeley
- NFL draft: 1969: 17th round, 418th overall pick

Career history
- 1971–1975: Winnipeg Blue Bombers
- 1976–1978: Saskatchewan Roughriders

Awards and highlights
- CFL All-Star (1976); 3× CFL West All-Star (1974, 1976, 1977)

Paul Williams (born January 29, 1947) was a football player in the Canadian Football League (CFL) for eight years. Williams played defensive back for the Winnipeg Blue Bombers and Saskatchewan Roughriders from 1971 to 1978. He was a CFL All-Star in 1976.

He played college football at the University of California at Berkeley.
