= Sam Britts =

American gridiron football player (born 1950)

Profile
- Position: Linebacker

Personal information
- Born: February 28, 1950 (age 76); United States
- Listed height: 6 ft 0 in (1.83 m)
- Listed weight: 235 lb (107 kg)

Career information
- College: Missouri

Career history
- 1973, 1975: Edmonton Eskimos
- 1976–1977: Hamilton Tiger-Cats
- 1978–1981: BC Lions
- 1974: Detroit Wheels

Awards and highlights
- Grey Cup champion (1975); CFL All-Star (1973)

Sam Britts (born February 28, 1950) is a retired Canadian football player who played for the Edmonton Eskimos, Detroit Wheels, Hamilton Tiger-Cats and BC Lions. He played college football at the University of Missouri. He was inducted, along with the 1969 University of Missouri Tigers Football team, into the Missouri Sports Hall of Fame on January 25, 2015. He is a graduate of Rosary High School in St. Louis, Missouri.
