= 1977 CFL season =

Canadian Football League season

- East champions: Montreal Alouettes
- West champions: Edmonton Eskimos

65th Grey Cup
- Champions: Montreal Alouettes

CFL seasons
- 1976 1978

Canadian Football League team locations: West, East

The 1977 CFL season is considered to be the 24th season in modern-day Canadian football, although it is officially the 20th Canadian Football League season.

== CFL news in 1977 ==
The 65th Grey Cup game, nicknamed "The Ice Bowl", was held in Olympic Stadium in Montreal. The game itself set an attendance record with 68,318, which in turn set a record for ticket revenue of $1,401,930.

The Montreal Alouettes also set an CFL regular-season team attendance record with 69,093 attending the September 6 game against the Toronto Argonauts at Olympic Stadium.

== Regular season standings ==
West Division
Pos	Team	Pld	W	L	T	PF	PA	PD	Pts
1	Edmonton Eskimos (C, Q)	16	10	6	0	412	320	+92	20
2	BC Lions (Q)	16	10	6	0	369	326	+43	20
3	Winnipeg Blue Bombers (Q)	16	10	6	0	382	336	+46	20
4	Saskatchewan Roughriders	16	8	8	0	330	389	−59	16
5	Calgary Stampeders	16	4	12	0	241	327	−86	8

(C) First round bye; (Q) Qualified for playoffs

East Division
Pos	Team	Pld	W	L	T	PF	PA	PD	Pts
1	Montreal Alouettes (C, Q)	16	11	5	0	311	245	+66	22
2	Ottawa Rough Riders (Q)	16	8	8	0	368	344	+24	16
3	Toronto Argonauts (Q)	16	6	10	0	251	266	−15	12
4	Hamilton Tiger-Cats	16	5	11	0	283	394	−111	10

(C) First round bye; (Q) Qualified for playoffs

Edmonton and Montreal have first round byes.

== Grey Cup playoffs ==
The Montreal Alouettes are the 1977 Grey Cup champions, defeating the Edmonton Eskimos, 41–6, in front of their home crowd of 68,318 at Montreal's Olympic Stadium. This Grey Cup was known as the "Ice Bowl" since the field was frozen in a sheet of ice. There was controversy with respect to the game due to the fact the Eskimos were wearing normal cleats, while the Alouettes were wearing staples on their cleats giving them a huge advantage on the icy field. The Alouettes' Sonny Wade (QB) was named the Grey Cup's Most Valuable Player on Offence and Glen Weir (DT) was named the Grey Cup's Most Valuable Player on Defence. The Alouettes' Don Sweet (K) was named Grey Cup's Most Valuable Canadian.

=== Playoff bracket ===
November 12/13: Conference Semifinals
East
E3	Toronto Argonauts	16
E2	Ottawa Rough Riders	21
West
W3	Winnipeg Blue Bombers	32
W2	BC Lions	33

November 19/20: Conference Finals
E2	Ottawa Rough Riders	18
E1	Montreal Alouettes	21
W2	BC Lions	1
W1	Edmonton Eskimos	38

November 27: 65th Grey Cup @ Olympic Stadium – Montreal, Quebec
E1	Montreal Alouettes	41
W1	Edmonton Eskimos	6

== CFL leaders ==
- CFL passing leaders
- CFL rushing leaders
- CFL receiving leaders

== 1977 CFL All-Stars ==
=== Offence ===
- QB – Jerry Tagge, BC Lions
- RB – Jimmy Edwards, Hamilton Tiger-Cats
- RB – Jim Washington, Winnipeg Blue Bombers
- SB – Tom Scott, Winnipeg Blue Bombers
- TE – Tony Gabriel, Ottawa Rough Riders
- WR – Tom Forzani, Calgary Stampeders
- WR – Leon Bright, BC Lions
- C – Al Wilson, BC Lions
- OG – Jeff Turcotte, Ottawa Rough Riders
- OG – Ralph Galloway, Saskatchewan Roughriders
- OT – Mike Wilson, Toronto Argonauts
- OT – Dan Yochum, Montreal Alouettes

=== Defence ===
- DT – Glen Weir, Montreal Alouettes
- DT – Dave Fennell, Edmonton Eskimos
- DE – Jim Corrigall, Toronto Argonauts
- DE – Ron Estay, Edmonton Eskimos
- LB – Danny Kepley, Edmonton Eskimos
- LB – Mike Widger, Ottawa Rough Riders
- LB – Chuck Zapiec, Montreal Alouettes
- DB – Dickie Harris, Montreal Alouettes
- DB – Larry Highbaugh, Edmonton Eskimos
- DB – Paul Bennett, Toronto Argonauts
- DB – Pete Lavorato, Edmonton Eskimos
- DB – Randy Rhino, Montreal Alouettes

=== Special teams ===
- P – Ken Clark, Hamilton Tiger-Cats
- K – Dave Cutler, Edmonton Eskimos

== 1977 Eastern All-Stars ==
=== Offence ===
- QB – Tom Clements, Ottawa Rough Riders
- RB – Jimmy Edwards, Hamilton Tiger-Cats
- RB – Richard Holmes, Toronto & Ottawa
- SB – Peter Dalla Riva, Montreal Alouettes
- TE – Tony Gabriel, Ottawa Rough Riders
- WR – Jeff Avery, Ottawa Rough Riders
- WR – Brock Aynsley, Montreal Alouettes
- C – Donn Smith, Ottawa Rough Riders
- OG – Jeff Turcotte, Ottawa Rough Riders
- OG – Larry Butler, Hamilton Tiger-Cats
- OT – Mike Wilson, Toronto Argonauts
- OT – Dan Yochum, Montreal Alouettes

=== Defence ===
- DT – Glen Weir, Montreal Alouettes
- DT – Ecomet Burley, Toronto Argonauts
- DE – Jim Corrigall, Toronto Argonauts
- DE – Jim Piaskoski, Ottawa Rough Riders
- LB – Ray Nettles, Toronto Argonauts
- LB – Mike Widger, Ottawa Rough Riders
- LB – Chuck Zapiec, Montreal Alouettes
- DB – Dickie Harris, Montreal Alouettes
- DB – Eric Harris, Toronto Argonauts
- DB – Paul Bennett, Toronto Argonauts
- DB – Tony Proudfoot, Montreal Alouettes
- DB – Randy Rhino, Montreal Alouettes

=== Special teams ===
- P – Ken Clark, Hamilton Tiger-Cats
- K – Don Sweet, Montreal Alouettes

== 1977 Western All-Stars ==
=== Offence ===
- QB – Jerry Tagge, BC Lions
- RB – Willie Burden, Calgary Stampeders
- RB – Jim Washington, Winnipeg Blue Bombers
- SB – Tom Scott, Winnipeg Blue Bombers
- TE – Gord Paterson, Winnipeg Blue Bombers
- WR – Tom Forzani, Calgary Stampeders
- WR – Leon Bright, BC Lions
- C – Al Wilson, BC Lions
- OG – Buddy Brown, Winnipeg Blue Bombers
- OG – Ralph Galloway, Saskatchewan Roughriders
- OT – Layne McDowell, BC Lions
- OT – Charlie Turner, Edmonton Eskimos

=== Defence ===
- DT – Frank Landy, BC Lions
- DT – Dave Fennell, Edmonton Eskimos
- DE – David Boone, Edmonton Eskimos
- DE – Ron Estay, Edmonton Eskimos
- LB – Danny Kepley, Edmonton Eskimos
- LB – Roger Goree, Saskatchewan Roughriders
- LB – Glen Jackson, BC Lions
- DB – Paul Williams, Saskatchewan Roughriders
- DB – Larry Highbaugh, Edmonton Eskimos
- DB – Rocky Long, BC Lions
- DB – Pete Lavorato, Edmonton Eskimos
- DB – Joe Fourqurean, BC Lions
- S – Grady Cavness, BC Lions

=== Special teams ===
- P – Lui Passaglia, BC Lions
- K – Dave Cutler, Edmonton Eskimos

== 1977 CFL awards ==
- CFL's Most Outstanding Player Award – Jimmy Edwards (RB), Hamilton Tiger-Cats
- CFL's Most Outstanding Canadian Award – Tony Gabriel (TE), Ottawa Rough Riders
- CFL's Most Outstanding Defensive Player Award – Danny Kepley (LB), Edmonton Eskimos
- CFL's Most Outstanding Offensive Lineman Award – Al Wilson (C), BC Lions
- CFL's Most Outstanding Rookie Award – Leon Bright (WR), BC Lions
- CFLPA's Outstanding Community Service Award – Ron Lancaster (QB), Saskatchewan Roughriders
- CFL's Coach of the Year – Vic Rapp, BC Lions
