= Pete Lavorato =

Canadian gridiron football player and coach (born 1952)

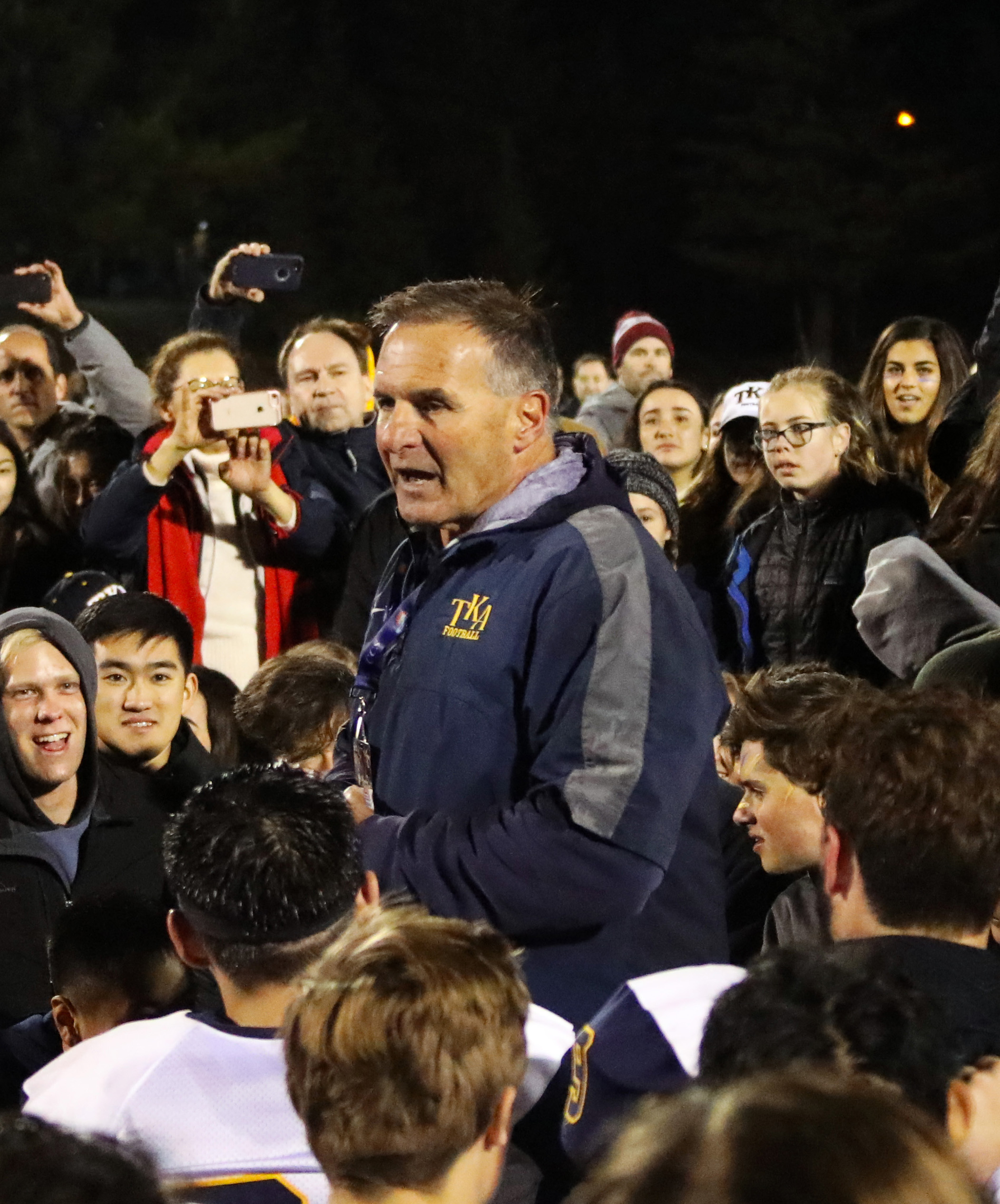
- Coach Pete Lavorato, December 1, 2018, Campbell California at CCS Championship game

No. 7
- Position: Defensive back

Personal information
- Born: August 26, 1952 (age 74); Edmonton, Alberta, Canada
- Listed height: 5 ft 11 in (1.80 m)
- Listed weight: 195 lb (88 kg)

Career information
- College: Utah State

Career history

Playing
- 1975–1981: Edmonton Eskimos
- 1982–1983: BC Lions
- 1983–1984: Montreal Concordes

Coaching
- 1995: Edmonton Eskimos (DL coach)

Awards and highlights
- 5× Grey Cup champion (1975, 1978−1981); CFL All-Star (1977); CFL West All-Star (1977)

Peter Lavorato (born August 26, 1952) is a Canadian former professional football player who played in the Canadian Football League (CFL) for ten years. Lavorato played defensive back for the Edmonton Eskimos, BC Lions and Montreal Concordes from 1975 to 1984. He was part of five Grey Cup-winning teams for the Eskimos. Lavorato was an All-Star in 1977. He was a theatre arts major and played college football at Utah State University. He acted in professional theatre during his football career.

From 2003 to 2017, Lavorato coached football and taught English and Drama at Sacred Heart School in Atherton, California. He led the varsity football team to win five Central Coast Section (CCS) titles. In 2017, Lavorato took over as head coach at The King's Academy in Sunnyvale, California. In his second year he guided the varsity team to their first CCS title in football. Lavorato previously taught in Alberta and served as the Edmonton Eskimos' defensive line coach in 1995.
