= Larry Watkins (Canadian football) =

American gridiron football player (born 1948)

Profile
- Position: Tackle

Personal information
- Born: May 22, 1948 (age 78); Louisville, Kentucky, U.S.
- Listed height: 6 ft 4 in (1.93 m)
- Listed weight: 265 lb (120 kg)

Career information
- High school: Louisville Male (KY)
- College: Western Kentucky

Career history
- 1970, 1976: Toronto Argonauts
- 1971: Hamilton Tiger-Cats
- 1972–1976: Edmonton Eskimos
- 1977–1979: BC Lions

Awards and highlights
- Grey Cup champion (1975)

Larry Watkins (born May 22, 1948) is a retired Canadian football player who played for the Toronto Argonauts, Hamilton Tiger-Cats, Edmonton Eskimos and BC Lions. He played college football at Western Kentucky University.
