= Ken Hinton =

American gridiron football player (born 1961)

No. 18, 28
- Position: Cornerback

Personal information
- Born: July 2, 1955 (age 71); Los Angeles, California
- Listed height: 5 ft 9 in (1.75 m)
- Listed weight: 169 lb (77 kg)

Career information
- College: San Diego State

Career history
- 1977–1983: BC Lions
- 1983–1985: Saskatchewan Roughriders

Kenneth Leroy Hinton (born July 2, 1955) is an American former professional football player who was a cornerback in the Canadian Football League (CFL) for nine seasons the BC Lions and Saskatchewan Roughriders. Hinton played college football at San Diego State University.
