= Leon Bright =

American gridiron football player (born 1955)

No. 26, 45
- Position: Running back

Personal information
- Born: May 19, 1955 (age 71); Starke, Florida, U.S.
- Listed height: 5 ft 9 in (1.75 m)
- Listed weight: 192 lb (87 kg)

Career information
- High school: Merritt Island
- College: Florida State

Career history
- 1977–1980: BC Lions (CFL)
- 1981–1983: New York Giants
- 1984–1985: Tampa Bay Buccaneers

Awards and highlights
- CFL's Most Outstanding Rookie Award (1977); Jackie Parker Trophy (1977); CFL All-Star (1977); CFL West All-Star (1977)
- Stats at Pro Football Reference

Leon "Pop" Bright, Jr. (born May 19, 1955 in Starke, Florida) is a former Gridiron football player in the Canadian Football League for four years and in the National Football League for five years.

He played Jr high school ball at Thomas Jefferson Jr High, high school football at Merritt Island High School in Merritt Island, Florida and was on the 1972 Merritt Island High, Florida Class AAAA state championship team. Bright was named to the FHSAA's All-Century Team which selected the Top 33 players in the 100-year history of high school football in the state of Florida's history.

He played college football at Florida State University where he still holds the record for most yards on a kickoff return, which resulted in a touchdown.

From 1977-1980, Bright played running back, wide receiver, defensive back, and kickoff returner for the BC Lions.

He also played for the New York Giants from 1981–1983, serving as the team's primary punt returner. He was with the Tampa Bay Buccaneers from 1984-1985.

Bright was selected to the Lions' 2004 50th Anniversary Dream Team. In 2006, he was the head coach for the Daytona Beach Thunder arena football team.

Leon also runs the Leon Bright Charitable Foundation. His foundation works with underprivileged kids and families.

He is the eldest of 10 children and also the eldest of 23 paternal grandchildren. Bright and wife, Tammy, currently reside in Volusia County, Florida. He has four children and four grandchildren.

== See also ==
- History of the New York Giants (1979-1993)
