= Ken Clark (punter) =

Canadian football punter (1948–2021)

No. 13
- Position: Punter

Personal information
- Born: May 26, 1948; Southampton, England, U.K.
- Died: August 8, 2021 (aged 73); Elmvale, Ontario, Canada
- Listed height: 6 ft 1 in (1.85 m)
- Listed weight: 200 lb (91 kg)

Career information
- University: Saint Mary's (Halifax)

Career history
- 1974: Portland Storm
- 1975–1978: Hamilton Tiger-Cats
- 1978: Toronto Argonauts
- 1979: Los Angeles Rams
- 1980–1983: Saskatchewan Roughriders
- 1983–1987: Ottawa Rough Riders

Awards and highlights
- 4× CFL All-Star (1977, 1980, 1982, 1985); 2× CFL East All-Star (1977, 1985); 2× CFL West All-Star (1980, 1982); All-WFL (1974)
- Stats at Pro Football Reference

Kenneth Lawrence Clark (May 26, 1948 – August 8, 2021) was a Canadian professional football player who was a punter for 17 seasons in the Canadian Football League, World Football League, and National Football League. In 1973 He led Saint Mary's University to a 14–6 win over McGill University to win the Vanier Cup, and won the Ted Morris Memorial Trophy as the game's Most Valuable Player. He was a punter for the Portland Storm of the WFL in 1974. He played in Super Bowl XIV for the Los Angeles Rams, becoming the second Canadian to play in a Super Bowl.

Clark died at the age of 73 on August 8, 2021.
