= Jim Washington (Canadian football) =

American gridiron football player (1951–2018)

No. 27
- Position: Running back

Personal information
- Born: October 13, 1951; Charleston, South Carolina, U.S.
- Died: June 24, 2018 (aged 66); Charleston, South Carolina, U.S.
- Listed height: 6 ft 0 in (1.83 m)
- Listed weight: 205 lb (93 kg)

Career information
- College: Clemson
- NFL draft: 1974: 6th round, 131st overall pick

Career history
- 1974–1979: Winnipeg Blue Bombers
- 1980: Saskatchewan Roughriders

Awards and highlights
- 2× Eddie James Memorial Trophy (1976, 1977); 2× CFL All-Star (1976, 1977); 2× CFL West All-Star (1976, 1977)

Jim "Jay" Washington (October 13, 1951 – June 24, 2018) was an American professional football player who played as a running back for the Winnipeg Blue Bombers. He was named CFL All-Star two times, in 1976 and 1977, and both times he won the Eddie James Memorial Trophy. Washington finished his career with 6,127 rushing yards.
