= Mike Widger =

American gridiron football player (1948–2016)

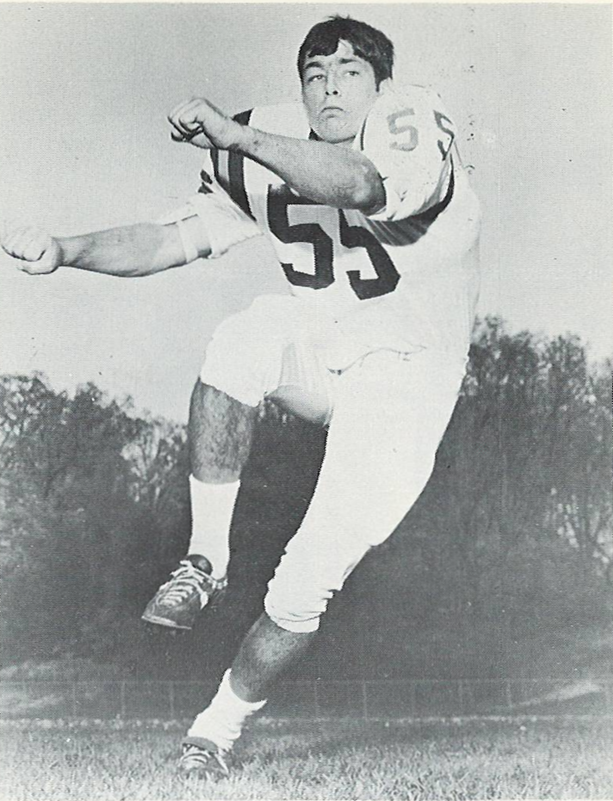
- Widger, c. 1969

Profile
- Position: Linebacker

Personal information
- Born: August 21, 1948; Pennsville Township, New Jersey, U.S.
- Died: March 3, 2016 (aged 67); Salem, New Jersey, U.S.
- Listed height: 6 ft 1 in (1.85 m)
- Listed weight: 210 lb (95 kg)

Career information
- High school: Pennsville Memorial (Pennsville, New Jersey)
- College: Virginia Tech

Career history
- 1970–1976: Montreal Alouettes
- 1977–1978: Ottawa Rough Riders

Awards and highlights
- 2× Grey Cup champion (1970, 1974); 4× CFL All-Star (1973, 1974, 1975, 1977); 6× CFL East All-Star (1970, 1972, 1973, 1974, 1975, 1977); First-team All-American (1968); Virginia Tech Sports Hall of Fame

Michael Jon Widger (August 21, 1948 – March 3, 2016) was an American professional football linebacker for the Montreal Alouettes and Ottawa Rough Riders of the Canadian Football League (CFL) from 1970 to 1978.

An All-American at Virginia Tech, he was a CFL All-Star four times and was a part of two Grey Cup winning victories for the Alouettes.

He was a nominee for the TSN Top 50 CFL Players list in 2006. He died in 2016, aged 67.
