= Ralph Galloway =

American gridiron football player (born 1946)

No. 59
- Position: Guard

Personal information
- Born: August 27, 1946 (age 80); Aurora, Illinois, U.S.
- Listed height: 6 ft 1 in (1.85 m)
- Listed weight: 250 lb (113 kg)

Career information
- College: Southern Illinois

Career history
- 1969–1979: Saskatchewan Roughriders

Awards and highlights
- 2× CFL All-Star (1976, 1977); 5× CFL West All-Star (1973, 1974, 1975, 1976, 1977)

Ralph Galloway (born August 27, 1946) is a former professional Canadian football offensive lineman who played eleven seasons in the Canadian Football League for the Saskatchewan Roughriders. He was a CFL All-Star in 1976 and 1977, and named to five consecutive Western Conference All-Star Teams from 1973 to 1977.
