= Rhome Nixon =

Canadian football player (born 1944)

Profile
- Position: Wide receiver

Personal information
- Born: February 9, 1944 (age 82); Houston, Texas, U.S.
- Listed height: 6 ft 5 in (1.96 m)
- Listed weight: 215 lb (98 kg)

Career information
- College: Southern
- AFL draft: 1966: Red Shirt 5th round, 44th overall pick

Career history
- 1970: BC Lions
- 1972–1975: Ottawa Rough Riders

Awards and highlights
- Grey Cup champion (1973)

Rhome Nixon (born February 9, 1944) is an American former professional football player who played for the Ottawa Rough Riders and BC Lions. He played college football at Southern University.
