= Chuck Zapiec =

American football player (born 1949)

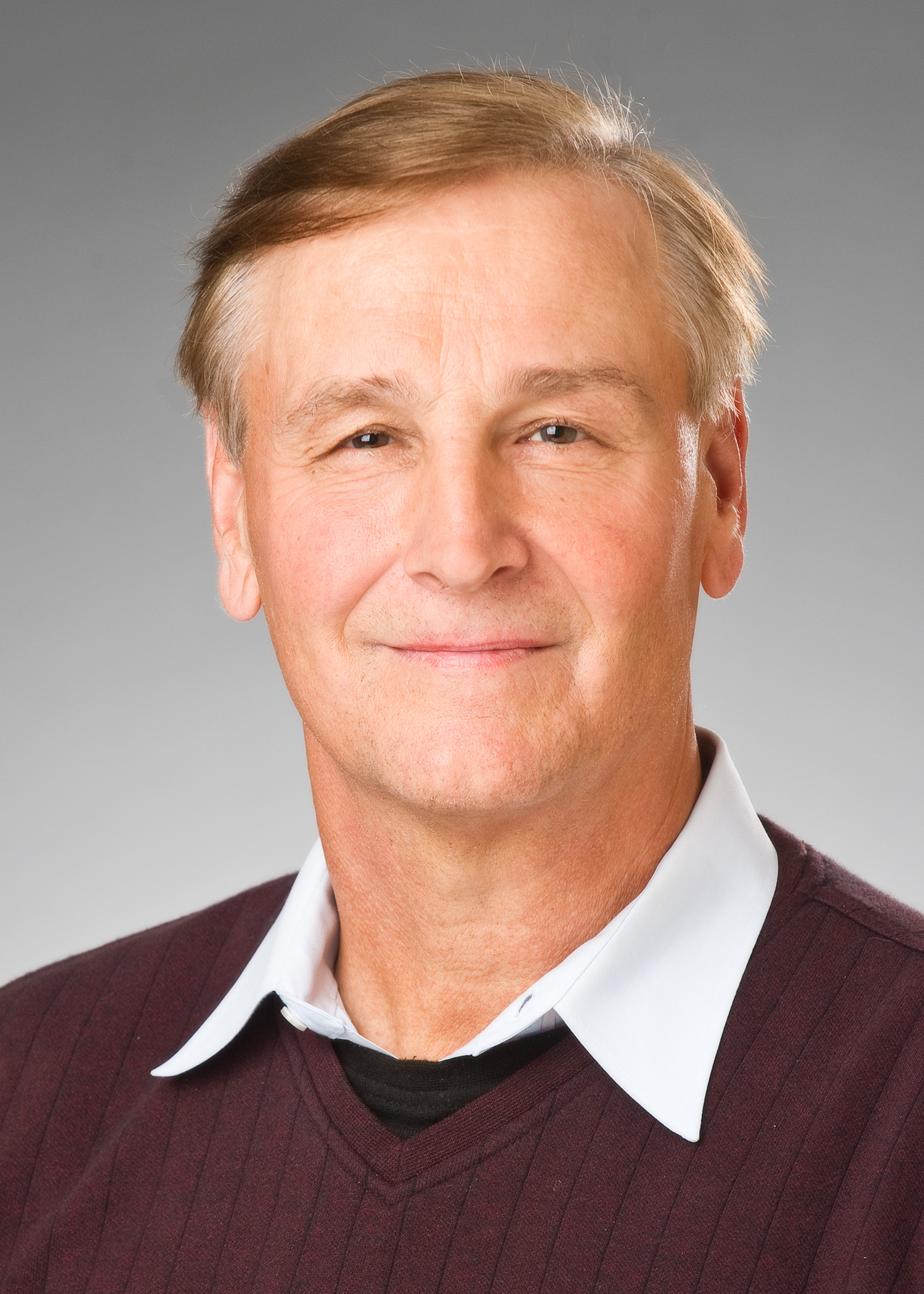

Profile
- Position: Linebacker

Personal information
- Born: July 1, 1949 (age 77); Philadelphia, Pennsylvania, U.S.
- Listed height: 6 ft 2 in (1.88 m)
- Listed weight: 216 lb (98 kg)

Career information
- High school: La Salle College (Wyndmoor, Pennsylvania)
- College: Penn State
- NFL draft: 1972: 4th round, 93rd overall pick

Career history
- 1972: Dallas Cowboys*
- 1972: Miami Dolphins*
- 1972–1973: Ottawa Rough Riders
- 1974–1978: Montreal Alouettes
- * Offseason or practice squad member only

Awards and highlights
- 3× Grey Cup champion (1973, 1974, 1977); 2× CFL All-Star (1977, 1978); 4× CFL East All-Star (1974, 1976, 1977, 1978); First-team All-American (1971); 2× First-team All-East (1969, 1971)

Charles Zapiec (born July 1, 1949) is an American former professional football player who was a linebacker in the Canadian Football League (CFL) for the Ottawa Rough Riders and Montreal Alouettes. He earned his All-American status as a linebacker in the only year that he played linebacker at "Linebacker U". Prior to his senior year, he also started two seasons as an offensive guard and helped his team to undefeated seasons in 1968 and 1969. He was selected in the fourth round of the 1972 NFL draft by the Dallas Cowboys.

== Early life ==
Zapiec started every game at Penn State that he was eligible for and graduated with the best record of any Penn State Player ever, 34 and 1, winning two Orange Bowls, defeating Kansas and Missouri, and one Cotton Bowl, a win over Texas.

"Big Daddy Z", as he was known by his friends and coach Paterno, started as an offensive guard his sophomore and junior years when the Nittany Lions went undefeated in 1968 and 1969. "Big Z" was named to the All-America Blocking Team selected by Wirt Gammon of the Chattanooga Times in 1969. As an Offensive Guard he earned All-East Honors each Year and was an Honorable Mention All American selection in 1969.

He is best remembered in Penn State annals as the lead blocker that took out Kansas All-American John Zook at the goal line that allowed Bobby Campbell to score a 2-point conversion that lead to a Nittany Lion 15-14 Orange Bowl Victory with no time on the clock. This successful try followed an errant pass on the first 2-point attempt when Kansas was penalized for having 12 men on the field. George Plimpton, author of the book and movie Paper Lion, went on to characterize Zapiec's block on Zook as the most important block in college football, equivalent to Jerry Kramer taking out Jethro Pugh at the goal line to allow Bart Starr to score in the 1967 NFL Championship. Fourteen years later, NBC voted the Penn State - Kansas finish as the most exciting game in the first 40 years of televising college football.

Switching to defense for the 1970 Season, Big Z was moved from guard to middle linebacker, a position he was destined to play after idolizing his boyhood hero Chuck Bednarik, aka, "Concrete Charlie". Bednarik was the last of the two-way performers in the NFL leading the Philadelphia Eagles to the 1960 championship over Vince Lombardi's Packers when he played Center and Middle Linebacker for 60 minutes.

After only playing one game as a middle linebacker that year against Navy in 1970, he suffered an appendectomy flying out to Colorado to play the Buffaloes who went on the next day to defeat the Nittany Lions and bring their 31-game winning streak to a halt. The next year, he returned to the defensive side of the ball moving to outside linebacker, captaining the team and earning First-team All-American honors. Additionally, he was awarded the Chevrolet Defensive Player of the Game Award (1971 was the first year that Chevrolet gave the game award) against Iowa that year when he made 18 solo tackles in a victory over the Hawkeyes at Kinnick Stadium - still a one-game record for Penn State Linebackers.

== Professional career ==
=== Dallas Cowboys ===
Zapiec was selected by the Dallas Cowboys in the fourth round (93rd overall) of the 1972 NFL draft. He faced a difficult challenge in making the team, after the Cowboys selected five linebackers and had one of the best linebacking corps in NFL history already in place. He was waived on August 16.

=== Miami Dolphins ===
On August 16, 1972, he was claimed off waivers by the Miami Dolphins as a backup to middle linebacker Nick Buoniconti. He was released on September 12.

=== Ottawa Rough Riders ===
In 1972, he signed to play linebacker for the Ottawa Rough Riders in the Canadian Football League. The next year, he was placed on recall waivers in mid-season.

=== Montreal Alouettes ===
In 1973, Zapiec was claimed by the Montreal Alouettes who were coached by Marv Levy. He was a CFL All-Star two times and was a part of two Grey Cup victories for the Alouettes. He left the team to sign with the Kansas City Chiefs.

=== Kansas City Chiefs ===
On February 28, 1979, he was signed by the Kansas City Chiefs, reuniting with Levy who was his head coach with the Alouettes. He was cut on August 7.

Zapiec has the distinction of playing for the winningest coach in college football, Joe Paterno, and the winningest coach in professional football, Don Shula. He also played for two other Pro Football Hall of Fame coaches, Tom Landry and Marv Levy.

== Personal life ==
After his football career, he became a venture capital and private equity professional. In the mid-1990s he left Merrill Lynch and formed his own venture capital company, Waterford Capital. Waterford invested in fast growing Internet companies, many of which are still operating today.

He later founded and became chief executive officer of an Internet company, appliedE, focused on "knowledge archival and recollection systems and methods", used by professionals to bill their clients for research done over the Internet. He registered five patents, which formed the basis of the company's software product, PartnerOnline.

A medical setback sent him on rest and recovery vacation to Hilton Head in 1997 where he started investing in real estate. Using his technology background, he was one of the first vacation rental companies to advertise on the Internet and he used that advantage to grow his real estate holdings over the next 10 years.

Zapiec owned a vacation rental company, Hilton Head Hideaways. Additionally, he owns two other enterprises, a cleaning services company - A-1 Cleaning Services, and a maintenance company - A-1 Resort Services.
