= Wayne Tosh =

Canadian football player

Profile
- Position: Defensive back

Personal information
- Born: August 7, 1947 (age 79); Sarnia, Ontario, Canada
- Listed height: 5 ft 11 in (1.80 m)
- Listed weight: 180 lb (82 kg)

Career history
- 1971–1978: Ottawa Rough Riders

Awards and highlights
- Grey Cup champion (1973, 1976)

Wayne Tosh (born August 7, 1947) is a retired Canadian football player who played for the Ottawa Rough Riders. He played college football at University of Richmond.
