= Randy Rhino =

American gridiron football player (born 1953)

No. 21
- Position: Defensive back

Personal information
- Born: December 2, 1953 (age 72); Atlanta, Georgia, U.S.
- Listed height: 5 ft 10 in (1.78 m)
- Listed weight: 180 lb (82 kg)

Career information
- High school: Olympic (Charlotte, North Carolina)
- College: Georgia Tech
- NFL draft: 1975: 14th round, 344th overall pick

Career history
- 1975: Charlotte Hornets
- 1976–1980: Montreal Alouettes
- 1981: Ottawa Rough Riders

Awards and highlights
- Grey Cup champion (1977); James P. McCaffrey Trophy (1978); 3× CFL All-Star (1977, 1978, 1981); 3× CFL East All-Star (1977, 1978, 1981); Consensus All-American (1973); 2× First-team All-American (1972, 1974)
- College Football Hall of Fame

Randy Rhino (born December 2, 1953) is an American former professional football player. After a standout college career at Georgia Tech, he became an all-star defensive back in the Canadian Football League (CFL), and as a Chiropractor, retired from his Alma Mater in 2023.

Rhino grew up in Charlotte, North Carolina, and led Olympic High School to a state football championship final game. For college he played for Georgia Tech's Yellow Jackets, where he was a first-team All-American.

He began his professional career in 1975 in the World Football League (WFL), playing for Charlotte, where he intercepted three passes (one for a touchdown), caught one pass on offense for a touchdown, and returned punts and kickoffs. Following the demise of the WFL, he joined the Montreal Alouettes of the Canadian Football League (CFL) and played 74 games over five seasons (1976 to 1980) and . He intercepted 18 passes and returned them for 404 yards, was on both the 1976 and 1977 Eastern Conference and CFL All-Star team, and won the Grey Cup in 1977. He joined the Ottawa Rough Riders for one season, 1981, and was again a 1981 Division and all star, and was back in the Grey Cup, losing to Warren Moon and the Edmonton Eskimoes.

In 2002, he was inducted into the College Football Hall of Fame.

== See also ==
- List of NCAA major college yearly punt and kickoff return leaders
