= Willie Thomas (Canadian football) =

Canadian football player (born 1955)

Profile
- Positions: Centre, Guard

Personal information
- Born: August 14, 1955 (age 71); Winnipeg, Manitoba, Canada
- Listed height: 6 ft 1 in (1.85 m)
- Listed weight: 227 lb (103 kg)

Career information
- College: Calgary

Career history
- 1977–1979: Calgary Stampeders
- 1980–1982: Winnipeg Blue Bombers
- 1983-1984: Calgary Stampeders
- 1985: Saskatchewan Roughriders
- 1986: Toronto Argonauts

William Thomas (born August 14, 1955) is a Canadian former professional football offensive lineman who played 10 seasons in the Canadian Football League (CFL) for four different teams. Thomas played college football at the University of Calgary. He played a total of 139 CFL games over 10 seasons. He published an autobiographical book on his experience in the CFL in 1987.

== Bibliography ==
Thomas, Willie (1987). Third and Long: Inside the CFL. Saskatoon: Western Producer Prairie Books. ISBN 0-88833-230-0.
