= Jimmy Edwards (gridiron football) =

American gridiron football player (1952–2002)

No. 20
- Position: Running back

Personal information
- Born: September 19, 1952; Oklahoma City, Oklahoma, U.S.
- Died: July 3, 2002 (aged 49); Oklahoma City, Oklahoma, U.S.
- Listed height: 5 ft 10 in (1.78 m)
- Listed weight: 195 lb (88 kg)

Career information
- High school: Classen High School
- College: Oklahoma; Northeast Louisiana

Career history
- 1974: Birmingham Americans
- 1975: Shreveport Steamers
- 1976–1978: Hamilton Tiger-Cats
- 1979: Minnesota Vikings
- 1981: Winnipeg Blue Bombers
- 1982: Saskatchewan Roughriders

Awards and highlights
- CFL's Most Outstanding Player Award (1977); 2× Jeff Russel Memorial Trophy (1976, 1977); 2× CFL All-Star (1976, 1977); 2× CFL East All-Star (1976, 1977); First-team Little All-American (1972)
- Stats at Pro Football Reference

Jimmy Edwards (September 19, 1952 – July 3, 2002) was a running back for the Hamilton Tiger-Cats of the Canadian Football League.

== Early life ==
Edwards was born in Oklahoma City, Oklahoma, and graduated from Classen High School in Oklahoma City. He married Elaine June Sheets. He played college football at the University of Oklahoma and the University of Louisiana at Monroe. He was selected by the Associated Press as a first-team running back on the 1972 Little All-America college football team.

== Professional career ==
He began his professional career in the WFL in 1974 with the Birmingham Americans. He rushed for 575 yards on 99 carries and scored 7 TDs, while also catching 11 passes and returning kickoffs. In 1975, he moved to the Shreveport Steamers, where he rushed for only 163 yards on 49 carries and scoring 3 TDs. In the short existence of the WFL Edwards was the 20th all-time leading rusher.

He starred with the Tiger-Cats from 1976 to 1978. He was an all star each season and won the CFL's Most Outstanding Player Award in 1977 when he led the league in rushing with 1581 yards. This remained a team record until 2004, when Troy Davis broke it. He also rushed for 1046 yards in 1976, with 7 touchdowns, and for 800 yards in 1978. He finished in Hamilton with 3467 yards on 641 carries.

In 1979, he played 14 games with the NFL's Minnesota Vikings, where he led the league in kickoff return yardage average (25.1 on 44 returns.) He also returned 33 punts, but caught only one pass and did not rush the ball.

He returned to the CFL briefly, playing with the Winnipeg Blue Bombers in 1981 and the Saskatchewan Roughriders in 1982.

== Death ==
Jimmy Edwards died on July 3, 2002, in Oklahoma City, Oklahoma. The NewsOK.com website announced his death and subsequent funeral service, which was held on July 10.
