= Norm Kimball =

Canadian football executive (1930–2026)

Personal information
- Born: June 29, 1930; Edmonton, Alberta, Canada
- Died: September 25, 2026 (aged 96); Calgary, Alberta, Canada

Career history
- 1966–1985: Edmonton Eskimos (GM)
- 1986–1987: Montreal Alouettes (President)

Awards and highlights
- 6× Grey Cup champion (1975, 1978–1982)
- Canadian Football Hall of Fame (Class of 1991)

Norman Harvey Kimball (June 29, 1930 – September 25, 2026) was a Canadian football executive. Joining the organization in 1961, he served as the general manager of the Edmonton Eskimos from 1966 to 1985. He won the Grey Cup with the team in 1975 and for five years straight from 1978 to 1982. From 1971 to 1974, he was Chairman of the CFL General Managers. In 1975, he became the chairman of the CFL's Player Relations Committee. He was also president and chief operating officer of the Montreal Alouettes from 1986 to 1987. Kimball was elected as a builder in the Canadian Football Hall of Fame on May 11, 1991.

In 2011, Kimball was inducted into the Alberta Sports Hall of Fame. He died on September 25, 2026, at the age of 96.
