= Paul Bennett (Canadian football) =

Canadian football player

No. 20, 27
- Position: Defensive back

Personal information
- Born: March 27, 1954 (age 72); Toronto, Ontario, Canada
- Listed height: 5 ft 10 in (1.78 m)
- Listed weight: 195 lb (88 kg)

Career information
- University: Wilfrid Laurier

Career history
- 1977–1979: Toronto Argonauts
- 1980–1983: Winnipeg Blue Bombers
- 1984: Toronto Argonauts
- 1984–1987: Hamilton Tiger-Cats

Awards and highlights
- Grey Cup champion (1986); 2× CFL's Most Outstanding Canadian Award (1983, 1985); James P. McCaffrey Trophy (1985); Dr. Beattie Martin Trophy (1983); 3× CFL All-Star (1977, 1983, 1985); 2× CFL East All-Star (1977, 1985); 2× CFL West All-Star (1982, 1983)
- Canadian Football Hall of Fame (Class of 2002)

Paul Frederick Bennett (born March 27, 1954) is a Canadian former professional football defensive back who played in the Canadian Football League (CFL).

== Early life and education ==
He attended General Brock Public School and W. A. Porter Collegiate Institute in Scarborough, Ontario. As a high school football player Paul played defensive back and quarterback and was named a Toronto All Star in 1972.

Offered a full football scholarship to the University of Missouri, in Columbia, Missouri, he played on the Tigers freshman team in 1973. He was redshirted on the varsity squad for his sophomore year.

== Career ==
In 1974 Bennett returned to Canada and attended Wilfrid Laurier University in Waterloo, Ontario. He played for WLU in 1975 and 1976, coached by Canadian Football Hall of Famer Tuffy Knight. He was protected by the Toronto Argonauts in the CFL draft.

Bennett was a hard-hitting safety and a fierce punt returner. He is a member of the Canadian Football Hall of Fame and won a Grey Cup with Hamilton in 1986 (whom he played with from 1985 to 1987,) after stints at the Winnipeg Blue Bombers (1980–1983), and Toronto Argonauts (1977–1979 and 1984).

Bennett retired in 1987 after eleven seasons. He had 45 interceptions and CFL records in punt return yards (6,358), punt return carries (659) and interception return yards (1,004).

He won the CFL's Most Outstanding Canadian Award in 1983 and 1985 and the James P. McCaffrey Trophy in 1985. He was a 4-time all star. In 1985, he was an all-star and won the James P. McCaffrey Trophy as Outstanding Defensive Player in the Eastern Division. And, for the second time in his career, he won the CFL's Most Outstanding Canadian Award.

== Personal life ==
He lives in Winnipeg, and brought the 2009 Canadian Football Hall of Fame Induction ceremony to the city. He is currently Head Coach for the Oak Park High School Raiders Junior Varsity football team.

== Awards and honours ==
- Grey Cup Champion - 1986
- CFL All-Star - 1977, 1983, 1985
- Eastern All-Star - 1977, 1985
- Western All-Star - 1982, 1983
- Schenley Most Outstanding Canadian Player - 1983, 1985
- James P. McCaffrey Trophy: Outstanding Defensive Player Eastern Division - 1985
- Lew Hayman Trophy: Outstanding Canadian Eastern Division - 1985
- Dr. Beattie Martin Trophy: Outstanding Canadian Player Western Division - 1983
- Grey Cup Participation - 1984, 1985, 1986
