= Jeff Turcotte (Canadian football) =

Canadian American football tackle

Profile
- Position: Tackle

Personal information
- Born: 1951 or 1952 (age 73–74); Ottawa, Ontario, Canada
- Listed height: 6 ft 5 in (1.96 m)
- Listed weight: 265 lb (120 kg)

Career information
- College: Colorado
- NFL draft: 1975: 17th round, 435th overall pick

Career history
- 1975–1980: Ottawa Rough Riders

Awards and highlights
- Grey Cup champion (1976); CFL All-Star (1977); 2× CFL East All-Star (1975, 1977)

Jeff Turcotte (born c. 1952) is a retired Canadian football player who played for the Ottawa Rough Riders of the Canadian Football League (CFL). He played college football at the University of Colorado.
