= Ed George =

American gridiron football player (born 1946)

Profile
- Position: Offensive tackle

Personal information
- Born: August 10, 1946 (age 80); Norfolk, Virginia, U.S.
- Listed height: 6 ft 4 in (1.93 m)
- Listed weight: 270 lb (122 kg)

Career information
- College: Wake Forest
- NFL draft: 1970: 4th round, 80th overall pick

Career history
- 1970–1974: Montreal Alouettes
- 1975: Baltimore Colts
- 1976–1978: Philadelphia Eagles
- 1979–1980: Hamilton Tiger-Cats

Awards and highlights
- CFL's Most Outstanding Offensive Lineman Award (1974); 4× CFL All-Star (1971, 1972, 1973, 1974); 5× CFL East All-Star (1970, 1971, 1972, 1973, 1974)
- Stats at Pro Football Reference
- Canadian Football Hall of Fame (Class of 2005)

Edward Gary George (born August 10, 1946) is an American former professional football offensive lineman in the Canadian Football League (CFL) and the National Football League (NFL).

== CFL ==
Ed George was drafted in the fourth round of the 1970 NFL draft by the Pittsburgh Steelers after playing at Wake Forest University. He opted to go to the Canadian Football League. George played left offensive tackle from 1970 to 1972 and left offensive guard from 1973 to 1974 for the Montreal Alouettes, finishing his career with the Hamilton Tiger-Cats from 1979 to 1980. George won two Grey Cups with the Alouettes, in 1970 and 1974, led by head coaches Sam Etcheverry and Marv Levy, respectively. He also played but lost in another for the Tiger-Cats in 1980.

For his tremendous blocking abilities on both running and passing plays as guard and tackle and despite only seven years of play, George was inducted into the Canadian Football Hall of Fame in 2005.

== NFL ==
George played in 1975 for the Baltimore Colts and from 1976 to 1978 for the Philadelphia Eagles of the National Football League.

== Family ==
His daughter Courtney worked for Speed TV doing NASCAR coverage in 2004.
