= 1974 CFL season =

Canadian Football League season

- East champions: Montreal Alouettes
- West champions: Edmonton Eskimos

62nd Grey Cup
- Champions: Montreal Alouettes

CFL seasons
- 1973 1975

Canadian Football League team locations: West, East

The 1974 CFL season is considered to be the 21st season in modern-day Canadian football, although it is officially the 17th Canadian Football League season.

== CFL news in 1974 ==
The Eastern Conference extended its regular season schedule from 14 to 16 games in 1974. The Western Football Conference had been playing a 16-game schedule since 1952. ORFU, which had not competed for the Grey Cup in 20 seasons and had dropped to amateur status, ceased to exist. The Montreal Alouettes change their colours to red, white and blue, and adopt the triangular "Delta" logo with the Montreal colours in it on a navy blue helmet.

The first players' strike in league history occurred during training camp. The strike was settled prior to the beginning of the regular season. No games were cancelled as a result of the dispute. It was this strike, which coincided with a similarly timed strike in the National Football League, which brought into existence the World Football League, a potential rival league to both the NFL and CFL, and one of the WFL's teams was to be placed in Toronto. In retaliation, Canadian Parliament introduced (but never passed) the Canadian Football Act, which would have given the CFL a government-enforced monopoly on professional football in Canada. The spectre of the bill prompted the Toronto franchise owner to relocate his team to the U.S. before it began play, and the only presence the WFL would ever have in Canada was a single game in London, Ontario, a city where the CFL had (and still has today) no direct presence.

== Regular season standings ==
West Division
Pos	Team	Pld	W	L	T	PF	PA	PD	Pts
1	Edmonton Eskimos (C, Q)	16	10	5	1	345	247	+98	21
2	Saskatchewan Roughriders (Q)	16	9	7	0	305	289	+16	18
3	BC Lions (Q)	16	8	8	0	306	299	+7	16
4	Winnipeg Blue Bombers	16	8	8	0	258	350	−92	16
5	Calgary Stampeders	16	6	10	0	285	305	−20	12

(C) First round bye; (Q) Qualified for playoffs

East Division
Pos	Team	Pld	W	L	T	PF	PA	PD	Pts
1	Montreal Alouettes (C, Q)	16	9	5	2	339	271	+68	20
2	Ottawa Rough Riders (Q)	16	7	9	0	261	271	−10	14
3	Hamilton Tiger-Cats (Q)	16	7	9	0	279	313	−34	14
4	Toronto Argonauts	16	6	9	1	281	314	−33	13

(C) First round bye; (Q) Qualified for playoffs

Edmonton and Montreal have first round byes.

== Grey Cup playoffs ==
The Montreal Alouettes are the 1974 Grey Cup champions, defeating the Edmonton Eskimos, 20–7, at Vancouver's Empire Stadium. Montreal's Sonny Wade (QB) was named the Grey Cup's Most Valuable Player on Offence and Junior Ah You (DE) was named the Grey Cup's Most Valuable Player on Defence. Montreal's Don Sweet (K) was named Grey Cup's Most Valuable Canadian.

=== Playoff bracket ===
November 10: Division Semifinals
East
E3	Hamilton Tiger-Cats	19
E2	Ottawa Rough Riders	21
West
W3	BC Lions	14
W2	Saskatchewan Roughriders	24

November 17: Division Finals
E2	Ottawa Rough Riders	4
E1	Montreal Alouettes	14
W2	Saskatchewan Roughriders	27
W1	Edmonton Eskimos	31

November 24: 62nd Grey Cup @ Empire Stadium – Vancouver, BC
E1	Montreal Alouettes	20
W1	Edmonton Eskimos	7

== CFL leaders ==
- CFL passing leaders
- CFL rushing leaders
- CFL receiving leaders

== 1974 CFL All-Stars ==
=== Offence ===
- QB – Tom Wilkinson, Edmonton Eskimos
- RB – George Reed, Saskatchewan Roughriders
- RB – Lou Harris, BC Lions
- RB – Roy Bell, Edmonton Eskimos
- TE – Tony Gabriel, Hamilton Tiger-Cats
- WR – Johnny Rodgers, Montreal Alouettes
- WR – Rhome Nixon, Ottawa Rough Riders
- C – Bob Swift, Winnipeg Blue Bombers
- OG – Ed George, Montreal Alouettes
- OG – Curtis Wester, BC Lions
- OT – Charlie Turner, Edmonton Eskimos
- OT – Larry Watkins, Edmonton Eskimos

=== Defence ===
- DT – John Helton, Calgary Stampeders
- DT – Jim Stillwagon, Toronto Argonauts
- DE – Wayne Smith, Ottawa Rough Riders
- DE – George Wells, Saskatchewan Roughriders
- LB – Jerry Campbell, Ottawa Rough Riders
- LB – Mike Widger, Montreal Alouettes
- LB – Roger Goree, Calgary Stampeders
- DB – Al Marcelin, Ottawa Rough Riders
- DB – Dick Adams, Ottawa Rough Riders
- DB – Larry Highbaugh, Edmonton Eskimos
- DB – Lorne Richardson, Saskatchewan Roughriders
- DB – Dickie Harris, Montreal Alouettes

== 1974 Eastern All-Stars ==
=== Offence ===
- QB – Jimmy Jones, Montreal Alouettes
- RB – Andy Hopkins, Hamilton Tiger-Cats
- RB – Art Green, Ottawa Rough Riders
- RB – Steve Ferrughelli, Montreal Alouettes
- TE – Tony Gabriel, Hamilton Tiger-Cats
- WR – Johnny Rodgers, Montreal Alouettes
- WR – Rhome Nixon, Ottawa Rough Riders
- C – Bob McKeown, Ottawa Rough Riders
- OG – Ed George, Montreal Alouettes
- OG – Ed Chalupka, Hamilton Tiger-Cats
- OT – Noah Jackson, Toronto Argonauts
- OT – Dan Yochum, Montreal Alouettes

=== Defence ===
- DT – Rudy Sims, Ottawa Rough Riders
- DT – Jim Stillwagon, Toronto Argonauts
- DE – Wayne Smith, Ottawa Rough Riders
- DE – Junior Ah You, Montreal Alouettes
- LB – Jerry Campbell, Ottawa Rough Riders
- LB – Mike Widger, Montreal Alouettes
- LB – Chuck Zapiec, Montreal Alouettes
- DB – Al Marcelin, Ottawa Rough Riders
- DB – Dick Adams, Ottawa Rough Riders
- DB – Rod Woodward, Ottawa Rough Riders
- DB – Al Brenner, Hamilton Tiger-Cats
- DB – Dickie Harris, Montreal Alouettes
- DB – Phil Price, Montreal Alouettes

== 1974 Western All-Stars ==
=== Offence ===
- QB – Tom Wilkinson, Edmonton Eskimos
- RB – George Reed, Saskatchewan Roughriders
- RB – Lou Harris, BC Lions
- RB – Roy Bell, Edmonton Eskimos
- SB – Rudy Linterman, Calgary Stampeders
- TE – Tyrone Walls, Edmonton Eskimos
- WR – Tom Forzani, Calgary Stampeders
- WR – Tom Scott, Winnipeg Blue Bombers
- C – Bob Swift, Winnipeg Blue Bombers
- OG – Ralph Galloway, Saskatchewan Roughriders
- OG – Curtis Wester, BC Lions
- OT – Charlie Turner, Edmonton Eskimos
- OT – Larry Watkins, Edmonton Eskimos

=== Defence ===
- DT – John Helton, Calgary Stampeders
- DT – Garrett Hunsperger, BC Lions
- DE – Jim Heighton, Winnipeg Blue Bombers
- DE – George Wells, Saskatchewan Roughriders
- LB – Ray Nettles, BC Lions
- LB – Pete Wysocki, Saskatchewan Roughriders
- LB – Roger Goree, Calgary Stampeders
- DB – Paul Williams, Winnipeg Blue Bombers
- DB – Chuck Wills, Winnipeg Blue Bombers
- DB – Larry Highbaugh, Edmonton Eskimos
- DB – Lorne Richardson, Saskatchewan Roughriders
- DB – Ted Provost, Saskatchewan Roughriders
- DB – Howard Starks, Calgary Stampeders

== 1974 CFL awards ==
- CFL's Most Outstanding Player Award – Tom Wilkinson (QB), Edmonton Eskimos
- CFL's Most Outstanding Canadian Award – Tony Gabriel (TE), Hamilton Tiger-Cats
- CFL's Most Outstanding Defensive Player Award – John Helton (DT), Calgary Stampeders
- CFL's Most Outstanding Offensive Lineman Award – Ed George (OG), Montreal Alouettes
- CFL's Most Outstanding Rookie Award – Sam Cvijanovich (LB), Toronto Argonauts
- CFL's Coach of the Year – Marv Levy, Montreal Alouettes
