= Jim Piaskoski =

Canadian gridiron football player (born 1948)

No. 73
- Position: Defensive end

Personal information
- Born: October 10, 1948 (age 78); Levack, Ontario, Canada
- Listed height: 6 ft 3 in (1.91 m)
- Listed weight: 240 lb (109 kg)

Career information
- College: Eastern Michigan

Career history
- 1972–1982: Ottawa Rough Riders

Awards and highlights
- 2× Grey Cup champion (1973, 1976); CFL East All-Star (1977)

Jim Piaskoski (born October 10, 1948) is a Canadian former professional football defensive end who played twelve seasons in the Canadian Football League (CFL) for the Ottawa Rough Riders.
