= Glenn Leonhard =

Canadian football player (born 1954)

Profile
- Position: Guard

Personal information
- Born: November 7, 1954 (age 71); Winnipeg, Manitoba, Canada

Career information
- College: Manitoba

Career history
- 1977–1986: BC Lions

Awards and highlights
- Grey Cup champion (1985)

Glenn Leonhard (born November 7, 1954) is a Canadian former professional football offensive lineman who played ten seasons in the Canadian Football League (CFL) for the BC Lions. He was a part of the Lions' Grey Cup victory in 1985.
