= John Beaton (Canadian football) =

Canadian football player (born 1950)

Profile
- Position: Defensive back

Personal information
- Born: March 2, 1950 (age 76); Vancouver, British Columbia, Canada
- Listed height: 6 ft 2 in (1.88 m)
- Listed weight: 190 lb (86 kg)

Career information
- College: Simon Fraser University

Career history
- 1973–1976: Edmonton Eskimos
- 1976–1977: Montreal Alouettes
- 1978–1980: BC Lions

Awards and highlights
- 2× Grey Cup champion (1975, 1977)

John Beaton (born March 2, 1950) is a former Grey Cup champion defensive back who played eight seasons in the Canadian Football League, winning two Grey Cup Championships.

Beaton started his career with the Edmonton Eskimos, playing 4 seasons and 47 games, intercepting 10 passes, and playing in three Grey Cup games, winning in 1975 against the Montreal Alouettes. In 1976, he joined the Larks for two seasons, playing 17 games and picking off 4 passes, and winning another Grey Cup against his old team in 1977. He finished with 3 seasons with the BC Lions, where he played 40 games with 6 interceptions.
