= Eric Harris (gridiron football) =

American gridiron football player (1955–2012)

No. 44, 26
- Position: Cornerback

Personal information
- Born: August 11, 1955; Memphis, Tennessee, U.S.
- Died: February 19, 2012 (aged 56); Little Rock, Arkansas, U.S.
- Listed height: 6 ft 3 in (1.91 m)
- Listed weight: 198 lb (90 kg)

Career information
- High school: Hamilton (TN)
- College: Memphis
- NFL draft: 1977: 4th round, 104th overall pick

Career history
- Toronto Argonauts (1977–1979); Kansas City Chiefs (1980–1982); Los Angeles Rams (1983–1985)

Career NFL statistics
- Sacks: 0.5
- Fumble recoveries: 4
- Interceptions: 21
- Defensive touchdowns: 1
- Stats at Pro Football Reference

Eric Wayne "Coochie" Harris (August 11, 1955 – February 19, 2012) was a gridiron football defensive back. Drafted by the Kansas City Chiefs in 1977, Harris was convinced to play Canadian football in the Canadian Football League (CFL) by Leo Cahill. He played for the Toronto Argonauts from 1977 to 1979. He then played American football for six seasons in the National Football League (NFL) for the Kansas City Chiefs (1980–1982) and the Los Angeles Rams (1983–1985).

On February 27, 1981, The Committee of 101's 12th Annual salute to professional football presented Eric with the Mack Lee Hill Award.

== Career ==
Eric Harris was drafted by the NFL but opted to play in the CFL, signing with the Toronto Argonauts in 1977. He was an East All Star in 1977 and 1978. In 1977, he set a record that still stands today. He intercepted a pass in a game against Montreal, and raced 115 yards for a touchdown. That season, he led Toronto with 6 interceptions for 166 yards. After three years in the Canadian Football League, Harris went to the NFL to play for the team that still had his draft rights, the Kansas City Chiefs. The Chiefs had drafted Harris in the fourth round of the 1977 NFL draft. Harris became one of the first defensive backs to sign a million contract when he returned to Kansas City in 1980.

Eric Harris wasted no time making an imprint on both his team and the National Football League. "We had a super secondary", said Marv Levy, "but it wouldn’t have been super without Eric." The former Canadian Football League all-star was second on the Chiefs with seven interceptions. He had a string of six consecutive games, Oct. 19 through Nov. 23, in which he intercepted a pass per game. Harris was drafted in the fourth round by the Chiefs in 1977, but played three years with Toronto of the CFL before coming to Kansas City. He became a starter at right cornerback the third week of regular season. His seven interceptions represented a quarter of the Chiefs 28 total. Harris also accounted for 50 tackles on the season, 41 unassisted.

Harris died on February 19, 2012, following a heart attack at his home in Little Rock, Arkansas.
