= Harold Holton =

Canadian football player (born 1952)

Harry Holton
Profile
- Position: Guard

Personal information
- Born: October 1, 1952 (age 74)
- Listed height: 6 ft 2 in (1.88 m)
- Listed weight: 235 lb (107 kg)

Career information
- College: Texas-El Paso
- NFL draft: 1974: 9th round, 220th overall pick

Career history
- 1974–1978: Calgary Stampeders
- 1979: Ottawa Rough Riders
- 1979: Toronto Argonauts

Awards and highlights
- CFL West All-Star (1978)

Harold Holton (born October 1, 1952) is a Canadian football player who played professionally for the Calgary Stampeders, Ottawa Rough Riders and Toronto Argonauts.
