= Wayne Conrad =

Profile
- Position: Center

Personal information
- Born: September 18, 1946 (age 80); Edmonton, Alberta, Canada
- Listed height: 6 ft 0 in (1.83 m)
- Listed weight: 235 lb (107 kg)

Career information
- College: University of Calgary

Career history
- 1972–1977: Montreal Alouettes

Awards and highlights
- 2× Grey Cup champion (1974, 1977); CFL All-Star (1975)

Wayne Conrad (born September 18, 1946) is a former all-star and Grey Cup champion center who played six seasons for the Montreal Alouettes of the Canadian Football League (CFL), winning two Grey Cup Championships. He played 80 regular season games for the Larks.

In 2008 Conrad auctioned off his jersey and Grey Cup ring to raise money for ALS and his former teammate Tony Proudfoot.

Wayne Conrad, a centre on the Alouettes' 1977 championship team, is auctioning off his Grey Cup jersey and ring to raise funds for the ALS Society of Quebec and B.C. "There's nothing you can do that's more sacred, Conrad told the Montreal Gazette's Herb Zurkowsky. "To be honest, I cherish it. I believe I have given the thing I cherish most. Do I love Tony Proudfoot? Yes, I do. Do I love his family? Yes, I do. Tony gave me that gift by calling me his friend. Money from a Vancouver fundraiser was also donated to the Tony Proudfoot Fund. Proudfoot, a friend and former teammate of Conrad's, suffered from ALS (Lou Gehrig's disease) .
