= 1978 CFL season =

Canadian Football League season

- East champions: Montreal Alouettes
- West champions: Edmonton Eskimos

66th Grey Cup
- Date: 26 November 1978
- Venue: Exhibition Stadium, Toronto
- Champions: Edmonton Eskimos

CFL seasons
- 1977 1979

Canadian Football League team locations: West, East

The 1978 CFL season is considered to be the 25th season in modern-day Canadian football, although it is officially the 21st Canadian Football League season.

The league drew 2,229,834 fans to its 72 regular season games, a record that would stand until the 2005 season by which time the league had extended its schedule from 16 to 18 games. The league's average attendance of 31,831 spectators per game remains a league record as of 2024.

== Regular season standings ==
West Division
Pos	Team	Pld	W	L	T	PF	PA	PD	Pts
1	Edmonton Eskimos (C, Q)	16	10	4	2	452	301	+151	22
2	Calgary Stampeders (Q)	16	9	4	3	381	311	+70	21
3	Winnipeg Blue Bombers (Q)	16	9	7	0	371	351	+20	18
4	BC Lions	16	7	7	2	359	308	+51	16
5	Saskatchewan Roughriders	16	4	11	1	330	459	−129	9

(C) First round bye; (Q) Qualified for playoffs

East Division
Pos	Team	Pld	W	L	T	PF	PA	PD	Pts
1	Ottawa Rough Riders (C, Q)	16	11	5	0	395	261	+134	22
2	Montreal Alouettes (Q)	16	8	7	1	331	295	+36	17
3	Hamilton Tiger-Cats (Q)	16	5	10	1	225	403	−178	11
4	Toronto Argonauts	16	4	12	0	234	389	−155	8

(C) First round bye; (Q) Qualified for playoffs

Edmonton and Ottawa have first round byes.

== Grey Cup playoffs ==
The Edmonton Eskimos are the 1978 Grey Cup champions, defeating the Montreal Alouettes, 20–13, at Toronto's Exhibition Stadium. This was the fourth championship meeting between Edmonton and Montreal within the last six years. The Eskimos' Tom Wilkinson (QB) was named the Grey Cup's Most Valuable Player on Offence and Dave "Dr. Death" Fennell (DT) was named the Grey Cup's Most Valuable Player on Defence. While Angelo Santucci (RB) was named Grey Cup's Most Valuable Canadian.

=== Playoff bracket ===
November 11/12: Division Semifinals
E3	Hamilton Tiger-Cats	20
E2	Montreal Alouettes	35
W3	Winnipeg Blue Bombers	4
W2	Calgary Stampeders	38

November 18/19: Division Finals
E2	Montreal Alouettes	21
E1	Ottawa Rough Riders	16
W2	Calgary Stampeders	13
W1	Edmonton Eskimos	26

November 26: 66th Grey Cup @ Exhibition Stadium – Toronto, Ontario
E2	Montreal Alouettes	13
W1	Edmonton Eskimos	20

== CFL leaders ==
- CFL passing leaders
- CFL rushing leaders
- CFL receiving leaders

== 1978 CFL All-Stars ==
=== Offence ===
- QB – Tom Wilkinson, Edmonton Eskimos
- RB – James Sykes, Calgary Stampeders
- RB – Mike Strickland, Saskatchewan Roughriders
- SB – Tom Scott, Edmonton Eskimos
- TE – Tony Gabriel, Ottawa Rough Riders
- WR – Joe Poplawski, Winnipeg Blue Bombers
- WR – Bob Gaddis, Montreal Alouettes
- C – Al Wilson, BC Lions
- OG – Harold Holton, Calgary Stampeders
- OG – Bill Stevenson, Edmonton Eskimos
- OT – Jim Coode, Ottawa Rough Riders
- OT – Dan Yochum, Montreal Alouettes

=== Defence ===
- DT – Dave Fennell, Edmonton Eskimos
- DT – John Helton, Calgary Stampeders
- DE – Mike Fanucci, Ottawa Rough Riders
- DE – Reggie Lewis, Calgary Stampeders
- LB – Danny Kepley, Edmonton Eskimos
- LB – Ben Zambiasi, Hamilton Tiger-Cats
- LB – Chuck Zapiec, Montreal Alouettes
- DB – Joe Hollimon, Edmonton Eskimos
- DB – Dickie Harris, Montreal Alouettes
- DB – Larry Brune, Ottawa Rough Riders
- DB – Gregg Butler, Edmonton Eskimos
- DB – Randy Rhino, Montreal Alouettes

=== Special teams ===
- P – Hank Ilesic, Edmonton Eskimos
- K – Dave Cutler, Edmonton Eskimos

== 1978 Eastern All-Stars ==
=== Offence ===
- QB – Condredge Holloway, Ottawa Rough Riders
- RB – Jimmy Edwards, Hamilton Tiger-Cats
- RB – Mike Murphy, Ottawa Rough Riders
- SB – Art Green, Ottawa Rough Riders
- WR – Bob Gaddis, Montreal Alouettes
- TE – Tony Gabriel, Ottawa Rough Riders
- WR – Jeff Avery, Ottawa Rough Riders
- C – Donn Smith, Ottawa Rough Riders
- OG – Charlie Brandon, Ottawa Rough Riders
- OG – Larry Butler, Hamilton Tiger-Cats
- OT – Jim Coode, Ottawa Rough Riders
- OT – Dan Yochum, Montreal Alouettes

=== Defence ===
- DT – Glen Weir, Montreal Alouettes
- DT – Mike Raines, Ottawa Rough Riders
- DE – Mike Fanucci, Ottawa Rough Riders
- DE – Jim Corrigall, Toronto Argonauts
- LB – Carl Crennell, Montreal Alouettes
- LB – Ben Zambiasi, Hamilton Tiger-Cats
- LB – Chuck Zapiec, Montreal Alouettes
- DB – Eric Harris, Toronto Argonauts
- DB – Dickie Harris, Montreal Alouettes
- DB – Larry Brune, Ottawa Rough Riders
- DB – Jim Burrow, Montreal Alouettes
- DB – Randy Rhino, Montreal Alouettes

=== Special teams ===
- P – Ken Clark, Toronto Argonauts
- K – Don Sweet, Montreal Alouettes

== 1978 Western All-Stars ==
=== Offence ===
- QB – Tom Wilkinson, Edmonton Eskimos
- RB – James Sykes, Calgary Stampeders
- RB – Mike Strickland, Saskatchewan Roughriders
- SB – Tom Scott, Edmonton Eskimos
- TE – Willie Armstead, Calgary Stampeders
- WR – Joe Poplawski, Winnipeg Blue Bombers
- WR – Mike Holmes, Winnipeg Blue Bombers
- C – Al Wilson, BC Lions
- OG – Harold Holton, Calgary Stampeders
- OG – Bill Stevenson, Edmonton Eskimos
- OT – Lloyd Fairbanks, Calgary Stampeders
- OT – Butch Norman, Winnipeg Blue Bombers

=== Defence ===
- DT – Dave Fennell, Edmonton Eskimos
- DT – John Helton, Calgary Stampeders
- DE – Ron Estay, Edmonton Eskimos
- DE – Reggie Lewis, Calgary Stampeders
- LB – Danny Kepley, Edmonton Eskimos
- LB – Tom Towns, Edmonton Eskimos
- LB – Glen Jackson, BC Lions
- DB – Joe Hollimon, Edmonton Eskimos
- DB – Terry Irvin, Calgary Stampeders
- DB – Ed Jones, Edmonton Eskimos
- DB – Gregg Butler, Edmonton Eskimos
- DB – Al Burleson, Calgary Stampeders

=== Special teams ===
- P – Hank Ilesic, Edmonton Eskimos
- K – Dave Cutler, Edmonton Eskimos

== 1978 CFL awards ==
- CFL's Most Outstanding Player Award – Tony Gabriel (TE), Ottawa Rough Riders
- CFL's Most Outstanding Canadian Award – Tony Gabriel (TE), Ottawa Rough Riders
- CFL's Most Outstanding Defensive Player Award – Dave "Dr. Death" Fennell (DT), Edmonton Eskimos
- CFL's Most Outstanding Offensive Lineman Award – Jim Coode (OT), Ottawa Rough Riders
- CFL's Most Outstanding Rookie Award – Joe Poplawski (WR), Winnipeg Blue Bombers
- CFLPA's Outstanding Community Service Award – Peter Muller (TE), Toronto Argonauts
- CFL's Coach of the Year – Jack Gotta, Calgary Stampeders
