= Frank Landy =

Canadian football player (born 1950)

Profile
- Position: Defensive tackle

Personal information
- Born: May 24, 1950 (age 76)
- Listed height: 6 ft 3 in (1.91 m)
- Listed weight: 235 lb (107 kg)

Career information
- College: North Dakota (1970–1972)

Career history
- 1973–1976: Saskatchewan Roughriders
- 1977–1980: BC Lions
- 1980: Toronto Argonauts

Awards and highlights
- CFL West All-Star (1977)

Francis P. Landy (born May 24, 1950) is a Canadian football player who played professionally for the Saskatchewan Roughriders, BC Lions and Toronto Argonauts.
