= Ecomet Burley =

Canadian football player (1954–2020)

Profile
- Position: Defensive tackle

Personal information
- Born: June 6, 1954; Palestine, Texas, U.S.
- Died: February 13, 2020 (aged 65); Pearland, Texas, U.S.
- Listed height: 5 ft 10 in (1.78 m)
- Listed weight: 240 lb (109 kg)

Career information
- College: Texas Tech

Career history
- 1976–1979: Toronto Argonauts
- 1980: Winnipeg Blue Bombers
- 1981: Hamilton Tiger-Cats

Awards and highlights
- CFL East All-Star (1977, 1981); Second-team All-American (1974); 2× First-team All-SWC (1973, 1975); Second-team All-SWC (1974)

Ecomet Burley Jr. (June 6, 1954 – February 13, 2020) was an American professional football player who played professionally for the Winnipeg Blue Bombers, Hamilton Tiger-Cats, and Toronto Argonauts.
