= Glen Weir =

Canadian football player (1951–2023)

No. 64
- Position: Defensive tackle

Personal information
- Born: July 23, 1951; London, Ontario, Canada
- Died: March 13, 2023 (aged 71); London, Ontario, Canada
- Listed height: 6 ft 2 in (1.88 m)
- Listed weight: 242 lb (110 kg)

Career information
- ORFU: London Lords

Career history
- 1972–1981: Montreal Alouettes
- 1982–1984: Montreal Concordes

Awards and highlights
- 2× Grey Cup champion (1974, 1977); Grey Cup Most Valuable Player (1977); 2× CFL All-Star (1975, 1977); 6× CFL East All-Star (1975–1979, 1982); James P. McCaffrey Trophy (1977)
- Canadian Football Hall of Fame (Class of 2009)

Glen Weir (July 23, 1951 – March 13, 2023) was a Canadian professional football player who was a defensive lineman for the Montreal Alouettes/Montreal Concordes in the Canadian Football League (CFL).

Weir was born in London, Ontario, and played his amateur football with the London Lords intermediate league team. He had a 13-year career with the Alouettes from 1972 through 1982 and the Montreal Concordes from 1983 to 1984. He held the Alouettes' franchise record for most games with 203 until he was surpassed by Bryan Chiu in 2009. He played in five Grey Cup games, winning two, in 1974 and 1977. He was the Grey Cup Most Valuable Player (defensive) in 1977. He was also a five-time CFL All-Star. He was inducted into the Canadian Football Hall of Fame in 2009.

Canadian singer-songwriter Donovan Woods' song "My Cousin Has a Grey Cup Ring" was inspired by Weir, who is the cousin of Woods' father.

Weir died on March 13, 2023, at the age of 71.
