= Richard Holmes (Canadian football) =

American gridiron football player (born 1952)

Profile
- Position: Running back

Personal information
- Born: September 24, 1952 (age 74); Hope Mills, North Carolina, U.S.
- Listed height: 5 ft 10 in (1.78 m)
- Listed weight: 220 lb (100 kg)

Career information
- College: Edinboro State

Career history
- 1977: Toronto Argonauts
- 1977–1979: Ottawa Rough Riders
- 1979: Winnipeg Blue Bombers
- 1983: Tampa Bay Bandits

Awards and highlights
- CFL East All-Star (1977)

Richard Holmes (born September 24, 1952) is an American former professional football running back in the Canadian Football League (CFL).

A Fighting Scot from Edinboro State College, Holmes joined the Toronto Argonauts in 1977, but played only 3 games and rushed for 151 yards with them. He finished the year with the Ottawa Rough Riders, rushing for another 865 yards (giving him 1016 for the season) and scoring 11 touchdowns. He was an eastern all-star. He played 2 more season with Ottawa and finished 1979 with the Winnipeg Blue Bombers.

Holmes played one final season in the United States Football League, playing 18 games with the Tampa Bay Bandits.

His son, Tyler Holmes, also played in the CFL.
