= Donn Smith =

American gridiron football player (born 1949)

Profile
- Positions: Center, Tackle

Personal information
- Born: September 3, 1949 (age 77); Rochester, Minnesota, U.S.
- Listed height: 6 ft 4 in (1.93 m)
- Listed weight: 235 lb (107 kg)

Career information
- College: Purdue
- NFL draft: 1973: 7th round, 173rd overall pick

Career history
- 1973–1980: Ottawa Rough Riders

Awards and highlights
- Grey Cup champion (1973, 1976); 3× CFL East All-Star (1976, 1977, 1978)

Laton Donn Frederick Smith (born September 3, 1949) is an American former professional football player who played for the Ottawa Rough Riders. He played college football at Purdue University. Though selected by the Kansas City Chiefs in the seventh round of the 1973 NFL draft, Smith returned to his hometown for his professional career.
