= Dan Yochum =

American gridiron football player (1950–2020)

No. 67
- Position: Offensive tackle

Personal information
- Born: August 19, 1950; Bethlehem, Pennsylvania, U.S.
- Died: August 26, 2020 (aged 70); Northampton, Pennsylvania, U.S.
- Listed height: 6 ft 5 in (1.96 m)
- Listed weight: 252 lb (114 kg)

Career information
- College: Syracuse
- NFL draft: 1972: 2nd round, 37th overall pick

Career history
- 1972–1980: Montreal Alouettes
- 1980: Edmonton Eskimos

Awards and highlights
- 2× Grey Cup champion (1974, 1977); Leo Dandurand Trophy (1976); 4× CFL All-Star (1975–1978); 7× CFL East All-Star (1973–1979); Second-team All-East (1970)
- Canadian Football Hall of Fame (Class of 2004)

Dan Yochum (August 19, 1950 – August 26, 2020) was an American professional football player who was an offensive lineman for the Montreal Alouettes from 1972–1980 and the Edmonton Eskimos in 1980 of the Canadian Football League (CFL). He won three Grey Cups, two with the Alouettes and one with Edmonton, and was a four-time CFL All-Star.

== Biography ==
Yochum was born in Bethlehem, Pennsylvania. He was selected in the second round of the 1972 NFL draft by the Philadelphia Eagles after a stellar career at Syracuse University, but opted to enter the Canadian Football League that season. The Eagles, which held his NFL rights, made him available in the 1976 NFL expansion draft, where he was claimed by the Tampa Bay Buccaneers, but he never attended their training camp or played for them.

Yochum was inducted into the Canadian Football Hall of Fame in 2004.

== Death ==
Following recovery from COVID-19, Yochum died from a heart ailment on August 26, 2020, in Northampton, Pennsylvania, exactly one week after his 70th birthday.
