= Dickie Harris =

American gridiron football player (born 1950)

No. 18
- Position: Defensive back

Personal information
- Born: May 24, 1950 (age 76); Point Pleasant Beach, New Jersey, U.S.
- Listed height: 5 ft 11 in (1.80 m)
- Listed weight: 170 lb (77 kg)

Career information
- College: South Carolina
- NFL draft: 1972: 5th round, 114th overall pick

Career history
- 1972–1980: Montreal Alouettes
- 1982: Montreal Concordes

Awards and highlights
- 2× Grey Cup champion (1974, 1977); 7× CFL All-Star (1974–1980); 8× CFL East All-Star (1973–1980); First-team All-American (1970); Second-team All-American (1971)
- Canadian Football Hall of Fame (Class of 1999)

Dickie Harris (born May 24, 1950) is a former all-star defensive back with the Montreal Alouettes of the Canadian Football League (CFL).

A graduate of the University of South Carolina, Harris started his 10-year career with the Alouettes in 1972, spanning 134 games. He was an 8-time all-star and won the Grey Cup in 1974 and 1977. His 38 interceptions for 631 yards are team records as is his 118-yard interception return. He retired in 1980, but returned to the Montreal Concordes in 1982 for 3 games.

He was inducted into the Canadian Football Hall of Fame in 1999. In November, 2006, Harris was voted one of the CFL's Top 50 players (#33) of the league's modern era by Canadian sports network TSN.
