= 1975 CFL season =

Canadian Football League season

- East champions: Montreal Alouettes
- West champions: Edmonton Eskimos

63rd Grey Cup
- Champions: Edmonton Eskimos

CFL seasons
- 1974 1976

Canadian Football League team locations: West, East

The 1975 CFL season is considered to be the 22nd season in modern-day Canadian football, although it is officially the 18th Canadian Football League season.

== CFL news in 1975 ==
Calgary became the first city in the Canadian Prairie Provinces to host the Grey Cup championship game. The CFL changed the rules on blocking by allowing contact to be above waist level on punt returns. The two-point convert was introduced to the league, as was the option after a field goal attempt by one team (regardless of whether it was made or not) to let the opposing team either kick off or scrimmage from their own 35-yard line (the latter option was eliminated in 2009, but was reinstated the next year).

Tragedy struck the CFL on October 11, when Hamilton Tiger-Cats star defensive lineman Tom Pate suffered an aneurysm in the fourth quarter against the Stampeders at McMahon Stadium. Pate never regained consciousness and died two days later at the age of 23. A year later, the CFLPA announced the Tom Pate Memorial Award in his honour to be awarded to the player who best personifies a unique combination of outstanding sportsmanship and dedication to the league and the community.

== Regular season standings ==
West Division
Pos	Team	Pld	W	L	T	PF	PA	PD	Pts
1	Edmonton Eskimos (C, Q)	16	12	4	0	432	370	+62	24
2	Saskatchewan Roughriders (Q)	16	10	5	1	373	309	+64	21
3	Winnipeg Blue Bombers (Q)	16	6	8	2	340	383	−43	14
4	Calgary Stampeders	16	6	10	0	387	363	+24	12
5	BC Lions	16	6	10	0	276	331	−55	12

(C) First round bye; (Q) Qualified for playoffs

East Division
Pos	Team	Pld	W	L	T	PF	PA	PD	Pts
1	Ottawa Rough Riders (C, Q)	16	10	5	1	394	280	+114	21
2	Montreal Alouettes (Q)	16	9	7	0	353	345	+8	18
3	Hamilton Tiger-Cats (Q)	16	5	10	1	284	395	−111	11
4	Toronto Argonauts	16	5	10	1	261	324	−63	11

(C) First round bye; (Q) Qualified for playoffs

Edmonton and Ottawa have first round byes.

== Grey Cup playoffs ==
The Edmonton Eskimos are the 1975 Grey Cup champions, defeating the Montreal Alouettes, 9–8, at Calgary's McMahon Stadium. This was the first Grey Cup game to be held in the prairies. Montreal's Steve Ferrughelli (RB) was named the Grey Cup's Most Valuable Player on Offence and Lewis Cook (DB) was named the Grey Cup's Most Valuable Player on Defence. Edmonton's Dave Cutler (K) was named Grey Cup's Most Valuable Canadian.

=== Playoff bracket ===
November 9: Conference Semifinals
1
8
East
E3	Hamilton Tiger-Cats	12
E2	Montreal Alouettes	35
2
7
West
W3	Winnipeg Blue Bombers	24
W2	Saskatchewan Roughriders	42

November 16: Conference Finals
E2	Montreal Alouettes	20
E1	Ottawa Rough Riders	10
W2	Saskatchewan Roughriders	18
W1	Edmonton Eskimos	30

November 23: 63rd Grey Cup @ McMahon Stadium – Calgary, AB
E2	Montreal Alouettes	8
W1	Edmonton Eskimos	9

== CFL leaders ==
- CFL passing leaders
- CFL rushing leaders
- CFL receiving leaders

== 1975 CFL All-Stars ==
=== Offence ===
- QB – Ron Lancaster, Saskatchewan Roughriders
- RB – Willie Burden, Calgary Stampeders
- RB – Art Green, Ottawa Rough Riders
- RB – Johnny Rodgers, Montreal Alouettes
- TE – Peter Dalla Riva, Montreal Alouettes
- TE – Tony Gabriel, Ottawa Rough Riders
- WR – George McGowan, Edmonton Eskimos
- C – Wayne Conrad, Montreal Alouettes
- C – Al Wilson, BC Lions
- OG – Dave Braggins, Montreal Alouettes
- OG – Willie Martin, Edmonton Eskimos
- OT – Charlie Turner, Edmonton Eskimos
- OT – Dan Yochum, Montreal Alouettes

=== Defence ===
- DT – John Helton, Calgary Stampeders
- DT – Glen Weir, Montreal Alouettes
- DE – Jim Corrigall, Toronto Argonauts
- DE – Bill Baker, BC Lions
- LB – Jerry Campbell, Ottawa Rough Riders
- LB – Larry Cameron, BC Lions
- LB – Mike Widger, Montreal Alouettes
- DB – Rod Woodward, Ottawa Rough Riders
- DB – Dick Adams, Ottawa Rough Riders
- DB – Lorne Richardson, Saskatchewan Roughriders
- DB – Vernon Roberson, Calgary Stampeders
- DB – Dickie Harris, Montreal Alouettes

== 1975 Eastern All-Stars ==
=== Offence ===
- QB – Tom Clements, Ottawa Rough Riders
- RB – Doyle Orange, Toronto Argonauts
- RB – Art Green, Ottawa Rough Riders
- RB – Johnny Rodgers, Montreal Alouettes
- TE – Peter Dalla Riva, Montreal Alouettes
- TE – Tony Gabriel, Ottawa Rough Riders
- WR – Terry Evanshen, Hamilton Tiger-Cats
- C – Wayne Conrad, Montreal Alouettes
- OG – Dave Braggins, Montreal Alouettes
- OG – Tom Schuette, Ottawa Rough Riders
- OT – Jeff Turcotte, Ottawa Rough Riders
- OT – Dan Yochum, Montreal Alouettes

=== Defence ===
- DT – Granville Liggins, Toronto Argonauts
- DT – Glen Weir, Montreal Alouettes
- DE – Jim Corrigall, Toronto Argonauts
- DE – Junior Ah You, Montreal Alouettes
- LB – Jerry Campbell, Ottawa Rough Riders
- LB – Mark Kosmos, Ottawa Rough Riders
- LB – Mike Widger, Montreal Alouettes
- DB – Rod Woodward, Ottawa Rough Riders
- DB – Dick Adams, Ottawa Rough Riders
- DB – Wayne Tosh, Ottawa Rough Riders
- DB – Larry Uteck, Toronto Argonauts
- DB – Dickie Harris, Montreal Alouettes

== 1975 Western All-Stars ==
=== Offence ===
- QB – Ron Lancaster, Saskatchewan Roughriders
- RB – Willie Burden, Calgary Stampeders
- RB – George Reed, Saskatchewan Roughriders
- RB – Lou Harris, BC Lions
- TE – Tyrone Walls, Edmonton Eskimos
- WR – Rhett Dawson, Saskatchewan Roughriders
- WR – George McGowan, Edmonton Eskimos
- C – Al Wilson, BC Lions
- OG – Ralph Galloway, Saskatchewan Roughriders
- OG – Willie Martin, Edmonton Eskimos
- OT – Charlie Turner, Edmonton Eskimos
- OT – Layne McDowell, BC Lions

=== Defence ===
- DT – John Helton, Calgary Stampeders
- DT – Tim Roth, Saskatchewan Roughriders
- DE – George Wells, Saskatchewan Roughriders
- DE – Bill Baker, BC Lions
- LB – Harry Walters, Winnipeg Blue Bombers
- LB – Larry Cameron, BC Lions
- LB – Joe Forzani, Calgary Stampeders
- DB – Ted Dushinski, Saskatchewan Roughriders
- DB – Brian Herosian, Winnipeg Blue Bombers
- DB – Lorne Richardson, Saskatchewan Roughriders
- DB – Vernon Roberson, Calgary Stampeders
- DB – Jim Marshall, Saskatchewan Roughriders
- DB – Larry Highbaugh, Edmonton Eskimos

== 1975 CFL awards ==
- CFL's Most Outstanding Player Award – Willie Burden (RB), Calgary Stampeders
- CFL's Most Outstanding Canadian Award – Jim Foley (WR), Ottawa Rough Riders
- CFL's Most Outstanding Defensive Player Award – Jim Corrigall (DE), Toronto Argonauts
- CFL's Most Outstanding Offensive Lineman Award – Charlie Turner (OT), Edmonton Eskimos
- CFL's Most Outstanding Rookie Award – Tom Clements (QB), Ottawa Rough Riders
- CFL's Coach of the Year – George Brancato, Ottawa Rough Riders
