= Edmonton Eskimos seasons (1970–1979) =

List of Canadian football team seasons

Contents:	1970 – 1971 – 1972 – 1973 – 1974 – 1975 – 1976 – 1977 – 1978 – 1979

From 1970 to 1979, the Edmonton Eskimos won three Grey Cups. During the decade, the Eskimos compiled a record of 107 wins, 61 losses, and 4 ties. One of the highlights of the decade was the start of a streak of five consecutive Grey Cup championships. The streak started in 1978.

== 1970 ==
1970 Edmonton Eskimos season
- General manager: Norm Kimball
- Head coach: Ray Jauch
- Home stadium: Clarke Stadium

Results
- Record: 9–7
- Division place: 2nd, West
- Playoffs: Lost Western Semi-final

The Eskimos offense had 291 points for, while the defense had 303 points allowed

=== Schedule ===
Week	Game	Date	Opponent	Results		Venue	Attendance
Week	Game	Date	Opponent	Score	Record	Venue	Attendance

==== Postseason ====
Round	Date	Opponent	Results		Venue	Attendance
Round	Date	Opponent	Score	Record	Venue	Attendance
		Calgary Stampeders	L 9–16	0–1		

=== Awards and honors ===
- Annis Stukus Trophy – Ray Jauch

== 1971 ==
1971 Edmonton Eskimos season
- General manager: Norm Kimball
- Head coach: Ray Jauch
- Home stadium: Clarke Stadium

Results
- Record: 6–10
- Division place: 5th, West
- Playoffs: Did not qualify

The Eskimos offense had 237 points for, while the defense had 305 points allowed

=== Schedule ===
Week	Game	Date	Opponent	Results		Venue	Attendance
Week	Game	Date	Opponent	Score	Record	Venue	Attendance

=== Awards and honors ===
- Dick Dupuis, Defensive Back, CFL All-Star

== 1972 ==
1972 Edmonton Eskimos season
- General manager: Norm Kimball
- Head coach: Ray Jauch
- Home stadium: Clarke Stadium

Results
- Record: 10–6
- Division place: 2nd, West
- Playoffs: Lost Western Final

The Eskimos offense had 386 points for, while the defense had 376 points allowed

=== Schedule ===
Week	Game	Date	Opponent	Results		Venue	Attendance
Week	Game	Date	Opponent	Score	Record	Venue	Attendance

==== Postseason ====
Round	Date	Opponent	Results		Venue	Attendance
Round	Date	Opponent	Score	Record	Venue	Attendance

=== Awards and honors ===
- Dave Gasser, Linebacker, CFL All-Star

== 1973 ==
1973 Edmonton Eskimos season
- General manager: Norm Kimball
- Head coach: Ray Jauch
- Home stadium: Clarke Stadium

Results
- Record: 9–5–2
- Division place: 1st, West
- Playoffs: Lost Grey Cup

The Eskimos offense had 372 points for, while the defense had 329 points allowed

=== Schedule ===
Week	Game	Date	Opponent	Results		Venue	Attendance
Week	Game	Date	Opponent	Score	Record	Venue	Attendance

==== Postseason ====
Round	Date	Opponent	Results		Venue	Attendance
Round	Date	Opponent	Score	Record	Venue	Attendance

=== Awards and honors ===
- CFL's Most Outstanding Player Award – George McGowan (WR)

== 1974 ==
1974 Edmonton Eskimos season
- General manager: Norm Kimball
- Head coach: Ray Jauch
- Home stadium: Clarke Stadium

Results
- Record: 10–5–1
- Division place: 1st, West
- Playoffs: Lost Grey Cup

The Eskimos offense had 383 points for, while the defense had 294 points allowed

=== Schedule ===
Week	Game	Date	Opponent	Results		Venue	Attendance
Week	Game	Date	Opponent	Score	Record	Venue	Attendance

==== Postseason ====
Round	Date	Opponent	Results		Venue	Attendance
Round	Date	Opponent	Score	Record	Venue	Attendance

=== Awards and honors ===
- CFL's Most Outstanding Player Award – Tom Wilkinson (QB)

== 1976 ==
1976 Edmonton Eskimos season
- General manager: Norm Kimball
- Head coach: Ray Jauch
- Home stadium: Clarke Stadium

Results
- Record: 9–6–1
- Division place: 3rd, West
- Playoffs: Lost Western Final

The Eskimos offense had 338 points for, while the defense had 402 points allowed

=== Schedule ===
Week	Game	Date	Opponent	Results		Venue	Attendance
Week	Game	Date	Opponent	Score	Record	Venue	Attendance

==== Postseason ====
Round	Date	Opponent	Results		Venue	Attendance
Round	Date	Opponent	Score	Record	Venue	Attendance

=== Awards and honors ===
- George McGowan, Wide Receiver, CFL All-Star

== 1977 ==
1977 Edmonton Eskimos season
- General manager: Norm Kimball
- Head coach: Hugh Campbell
- Home stadium: Clarke Stadium

Results
- Record: 10–6
- Division place: 1st, West
- Playoffs: Lost Grey Cup

The Eskimos offense had 447 points for, while the defense had 362 points allowed

=== Schedule ===
Week	Game	Date	Opponent	Results		Venue	Attendance
Week	Game	Date	Opponent	Score	Record	Venue	Attendance

==== Postseason ====
Round	Date	Opponent	Results		Venue	Attendance
Round	Date	Opponent	Score	Record	Venue	Attendance

=== Awards and honors ===
- CFL's Most Outstanding Defensive Player Award – Danny Kepley (LB)
