= 1973 Calgary Stampeders season =

Canadian football team season

- General manager: Rogers Lehew
- Head coach: Jim Duncan
- Home stadium: McMahon Stadium

Results
- Record: 6–10
- Division place: 4th, West
- Playoffs: did not qualify

The 1973 Calgary Stampeders finished in fourth place in the Western Conference with a 6–10 record and failed to make the playoffs.

== Regular season ==
=== Season standings ===
Western Football Conference
Team	GP	W	L	T	PF	PA	Pts
Edmonton Eskimos	16	9	5	2	329	284	20
Saskatchewan Roughriders	16	10	6	0	360	287	20
BC Lions	16	5	9	2	261	328	12
Calgary Stampeders	16	6	10	0	214	368	12
Winnipeg Blue Bombers	16	4	11	1	267	315	9

=== Season schedule ===
Week	Game	Date	Opponent	Results		Venue	Attendance
Week	Game	Date	Opponent	Score	Record	Venue	Attendance
	1		Saskatchewan Roughriders	W 23–15	1–0		
	2		Winnipeg Blue Bombers	L 7–30	1–1		
	3		Winnipeg Blue Bombers	W 18–9	2–1		
	4		Edmonton Eskimos	L 4–24	2–2		
	5		BC Lions	L 2–9	2–3		
	6		Winnipeg Blue Bombers	W 25–24	3–3		
	7		Saskatchewan Rougriders	W 25–8	4–3		
	8		Edmonton Eskimos	L 22–33	4–4		
	9		BC Lions	W 13–12	5–4		
	10		Hamilton Tiger-Cats	L 29–31	5–5		
	11		Toronto Argonauts	L 10–37	5–6		
	12		Montreal Alouettes	L 0–45	5–7		
	13		Ottawa Rough Riders	L 8–32	5–8		
	14		Saskatchewan Roughriders	L 7–34	5–9		
	15		Edmonton Eskimos	W 14–10	6–9		
	16		BC Lions	L 7–15	6–10		

== Roster ==
1973 Calgary Stampeders final roster
Quarterbacks: 12 Jim Lindsey; 14 Pete Liske; Running backs: 21 Rick Galbos; 17 Rudy Linterman; 27 Leon McQuay; 19 Jesse Mims; 16 Dick Wesolowski; 31 Ed White; 32 Bob Wyatt; Wide receivers: 22 Tom Forzani; 74 John Senst; 72 Gerry Shaw; Tight ends: 26 Mark Herman	Offensive linemen: 45 Basil Bark C; 63 Lanny Boleski T; 54 John Forzani G; 64 Max Huber T; 58 Marion Lattimore G; 52 Herb Schumm G; Defensive linemen: 60 Jim Bond DE; 65 Larry Dibbles DE; 70 Jim Furlong DE/P; 77 John Helton DT; 47 Fred James DT; 61 Craig Koinzan DE; 71 Brian Marcil DE	Linebackers: 79 Steve Brown MLB; 73 Joe Forzani OLB; 50 Roger Goree OLB; 56 Blain Lamoureaux OLB; Defensive backs: 24 Frank Andruski; 10 Ted Bachman; 28 Don Moulton; 20 Floyd Priester; 15 Larry Robinson K; 33 Jim Silye; 11 Howard Starks; Italics indicate International player

== Awards and records ==
=== 1973 CFL All-Stars ===
- DE – John Helton, CFL All-Star
