= 1974 Calgary Stampeders season =

Canadian football team season

- Head coach: Jim Wood
- Home stadium: McMahon Stadium

Results
- Record: 6–10
- Division place: 5th, West
- Playoffs: did not qualify

The 1974 Calgary Stampeders finished in fifth place in the Western Conference with a 6–10 record and failed to make the playoffs.

== Regular season ==
=== Season standings ===
Western Football Conference
Team	GP	W	L	T	PF	PA	Pts
Edmonton Eskimos	16	10	5	1	345	247	21
Saskatchewan Roughriders	16	9	7	0	305	289	18
BC Lions	16	8	8	0	306	299	16
Winnipeg Blue Bombers	16	8	8	0	258	350	16
Calgary Stampeders	16	6	10	0	285	305	12

=== Season schedule ===
Week	Game	Date	Opponent	Results		Venue	Attendance
Week	Game	Date	Opponent	Score	Record	Venue	Attendance
1	1	Thu, July 25	at BC Lions	L 20–23	0–1	Empire Stadium	22,879
2	2	Wed, July 31	vs. Saskatchewan Roughriders	L 18–24	0–2	McMahon Stadium	22,000
2	3	Mon, Aug 5	at Edmonton Eskimos	L 6–20	0–3	Clarke Stadium	21,696
3	Bye						
4	4	Wed, Aug 14	vs. BC Lions	W 20–18	1–3	McMahon Stadium	20,100
5	5	Wed, Aug 21	vs. Saskatchewan Roughriders	L 8–10	1–4	McMahon Stadium	26,200
6	6	Wed, Aug 28	at Winnipeg Blue Bombers	L 30–31	1–5	Winnipeg Stadium	22,644
6	7	Mon, Sept 2	vs. Edmonton Eskimos	L 16–20	1–6	McMahon Stadium	25,000
7	Bye						
8	8	Wed, Sept 11	at Hamilton Tiger-Cats	L 0–27	1–7	Ivor Wynne Park	25,110
8	9	Sat, Sept 14	at Ottawa Rough Riders	W 16–9	2–7	Lansdowne Park	14,396
9	10	Mon, Sept 24	vs. Montreal Alouettes	W 38–13	3–7	McMahon Stadium	20,000
10	11	Sun, Sept 29	at Saskatchewan Roughriders	L 10–34	3–8	Taylor Field	17,168
11	12	Sun, Oct 6	vs. BC Lions	L 7–20	3–9	McMahon Stadium	20,508
12	13	Mon, Oct 14	at Edmonton Eskimos	W 24–10	4–9	Clarke Stadium	24,214
13	14	Sun, Oct 20	Toronto Argonauts	W 21–18	5–9	McMahon Stadium	18,555
14	15	Sun, Oct 27	vs. Winnipeg Blue Bombers	W 44–11	6–9	McMahon Stadium	19,323
15	16	Sun, Nov 3	at Winnipeg Blue Bombers	L 9–19	6–10	Winnipeg Stadium	16,569

== Roster ==
1974 Calgary Stampeders final roster
Quarterbacks: 14 Karl Douglas; 7 Joe Pisarcik; Running backs: 27 Willie Burden; 26 Larry Cates DB; 21 Rick Galbos; 16 Dick Wesolowski; Wide receivers: 22 Tom Forzani; 32 Moody Jackson; 17 Rudy Linterman K; 72 Gerry Shaw	Offensive linemen: 45 Basil Bark C; 54 John Forzani G; 57 Harry Holton G; 64 Max Huber T; 62 Geary Murdock T; Defensive linemen: 60 Jim Bond DE; 77 John Helton DT; 47 Fred James DE; 61 Larry Moore DT; 63 Lorne Sherbina DT; 65 Gord Stewart DE	Linebackers: 73 Joe Forzani OLB; 50 Roger Goree OLB; 75 Blain Lamoureaux OLB; 79 Octavus Morgan MLB; Defensive backs: 10 Ted Bachman; 24 Ozell Collier; 74 Paul McKay P; 28 Don Moulton P; 15 Larry Robinson K; 33 Jim Silye; 11 Howard Starks; Special teams: 20 Cyril McFall K/P; Italics indicate International player

== Awards and records ==
- CFL's Most Outstanding Defensive Player Award – John Helton (DT)

=== 1974 CFL All-Stars ===
- DE – John Helton, CFL All-Star
- LB – Roger Goree, CFL All-Star
