= 1975 Calgary Stampeders season =

Canadian football team season

- Head coach: Jim Wood, Bob Baker
- Home stadium: McMahon Stadium

Results
- Record: 6–10
- Division place: 4th, West
- Playoffs: did not qualify

The 1975 Calgary Stampeders finished in fourth place in the Western Conference with a 6–10 record and failed to make the playoffs.

== Regular season ==
=== Season standings ===
Western Football Conference
Team	GP	W	L	T	PF	PA	Pts
Edmonton Eskimos	16	12	4	0	432	370	24
Saskatchewan Roughriders	16	10	5	1	373	309	21
Winnipeg Blue Bombers	16	6	8	2	340	383	14
Calgary Stampeders	16	6	10	0	387	363	12
BC Lions	16	6	10	0	276	331	12

=== Season schedule ===
Week	Game	Date	Opponent	Results		Venue	Attendance
Week	Game	Date	Opponent	Score	Record	Venue	Attendance
1	1	Wed, July 23	Saskatchewan Roughriders	L 2–20	0–1	Taylor Field	17,273
2	2	Wed, July 30	vs. BC Lions	W 30–28	1–1	McMahon Stadium	23,010
3	3	Tue, Aug 5	at BC Lions	W 28–13	2–1	Empire Stadium	18,167
4	4	Tue, Aug 12	vs. Winnipeg Blue Bombers	L 15–18	2–2	McMahon Stadium	27,186
5	5	Thu, Aug 21	vs. Ottawa Rough Riders	W 23–6	3–2	McMahon Stadium	25,878
6	6	Tue, Aug 26	at Winnipeg Blue Bombers	L 22–25	3–3	Winnipeg Stadium	25,210
6	7	Mon, Sept 1	vs. Edmonton Eskimos	L 31–35	3–4	McMahon Stadium	27,188
7	Bye						
8	8	Wed, Sept 10	at Saskatchewan Roughriders	L 17–31	3–5	Taylor Field	17,838
9	9	Tue, Sept 16	vs. Saskatchewan Roughriders	W 38–17	4–5	McMahon Stadium	27,188
9	10	Sun, Sept 21	at Toronto Argonauts	L 17–23	4–6	Exhibition Stadium	36,410
10	11	Sun, Sept 28	vs. Edmonton Eskimos	L 36–38	4–7	McMahon Stadium	27,188
11	12	Sat, Oct 4	at BC Lions	W 38–12	5–7	Empire Stadium	17,213
12	13	Mon, Oct 12	at Edmonton Eskimos	L 12–21	5–8	Clarke Stadium	26,147
13	14	Sat, Oct 18	vs. Hamilton Tiger-Cats	L 23–25	5–9	McMahon Stadium	22,897
14	15	Sun, Oct 26	at Montreal Alouettes	L 20–26	5–10	Autostade	21,760
15	16	Sun, Nov 2	vs. Winnipeg Blue Bombers	W 35–26	6–10	McMahon Stadium	21,106

== Roster ==
1975 Calgary Stampeders final roster
Quarterbacks: 14 Karl Douglas; 7 Joe Pisarcik; Running backs: 10 Willie Burden; 26 Larry Cates DB; 21 Rick Galbos; 16 Dick Wesolowski; Wide receivers: 22 Tom Forzani; 17 Rudy Linterman K; 72 Glenn Scolnik; Tight ends: 74 Henry Sovio; 70 Bob Viccars	Offensive linemen: 45 Basil Bark C; 62 Lloyd Fairbanks T; 54 John Forzani G; 57 Harry Holton G; 64 Max Huber T; Defensive linemen: 60 Jim Bond DE; 77 John Helton DT; 76 Pete Lazetich DE; 61 Larry Moore DE; 63 Lorne Sherbina DT; Special teams: 12 Gerald Kunyk P; 20 Cyril McFall K/P	Linebackers: 51 Larry Carr; 73 Joe Forzani; 50 Evan Jolitz; 71 Rick Konopka; 26 Blain Lamoureaux; Defensive backs: 25 Dave Campbell; 72 Don Cowie; 19 Mike Logan; 23 Dennis Meyer; 28 Don Moulton; 16 Vern Roberson; 11 Howard Starks; Italics indicate International player

== Awards and records ==
- CFL's Most Outstanding Player Award – Willie Burden (RB)

=== 1975 CFL All-Stars ===
- DE – John Helton, CFL All-Star
- DB – Vern Roberson, CFL All-Star
