= 1975 Toronto Argonauts season =

CFL team season

- Head coach: Russ Jackson
- Home stadium: Exhibition Stadium

Results
- Record: 5–10–1
- Division place: 4th, East
- Playoffs: did not qualify

Uniform

The 1975 Toronto Argonauts finished in fourth place in the Eastern Conference with a 5–10–1 record and failed to make the playoffs.

== Offseason ==
=== CFL draft ===
The Toronto Argonauts drafted the following players in the 1975 CFL draft.

Round	Pick	Player	Position	School
T	T	Paul Gibson	Defensive tackle	Guelph
T	T	Neil Mairs	Tailback	Otterbein
1	2	Al Charuk	Wide receiver	Acadia
4	29	Doug Brandt	Defensive back	Winona State
5	37	Don Cornwell	Linebacker	Guelph
6	45	Ed Dietrich	Defensive End	Wilfrid Laurier

== Regular season ==
=== Standings ===
Eastern Football Conference
Team	GP	W	L	T	PF	PA	Pts
Ottawa Rough Riders	16	10	5	1	394	280	21
Montreal Alouettes	16	9	7	0	353	345	18
Hamilton Tiger-Cats	16	5	10	1	284	395	11
Toronto Argonauts	16	5	10	1	261	324	11

=== Schedule ===
Week	Game	Date	Opponent	Results		Venue	Attendance
Week	Game	Date	Opponent	Score	Record	Venue	Attendance
1	1	Thu, July 24	vs. Ottawa Rough Riders	L 16–18	0–1	Exhibition Stadium	36,912
2	2	Fri, Aug 1	vs. Saskatchewan Roughriders	L 12–14	0–2	Exhibition Stadium	37,305
3	3	Wed, Aug 6	at Ottawa Rough Riders	W 16–14	1–2	Landsdowne Park	31,023
4	4	Wed, Aug 13	vs. Hamilton Tiger-Cats	W 27–7	2–2	Exhibition Stadium	40,474
5	5	Wed, Aug 20	at Edmonton Eskimos	L 11–28	2–3	Clarke Stadium	24,636
6	6	Wed, Aug 27	at Montreal Alouettes	L 17–33	2–4	Autostade	27,117
6	7	Mon, Sept 1	at Hamilton Tiger-Cats	L 11–20	2–5	Ivor Wynne Stadium	27,104
7	8	Sun, Sept 7	vs. Montreal Alouettes	L 20–23	2–6	Exhibition Stadium	39,120
8	9	Sat, Sept 13	at BC Lions	L 10–32	2–7	Empire Stadium	24,281
9	10	Sun, Sept 21	vs. Calgary Stampeders	W 23–17	3–7	Exhibition Stadium	36,410
10	11	Sat, Sept 27	at Ottawa Rough Riders	L 9–13	3–8	Landsdowne Park	28,810
11	12	Thu, Oct 2	vs. Winnipeg Blue Bombers	T 21–21	3–8–1	Exhibition Stadium	35,510
12	13	Mon, Oct 13	vs. Montreal Alouettes	L 13–24	3–9–1	Exhibition Stadium	37,023
13	14	Sun, Oct 19	at Montreal Alouettes	W 18–11	4–9–1	Autostade	22,323
14	15	Sat, Oct 25	vs. Hamilton Tiger-Cats	W 27–23	5–9–1	Exhibition Stadium	40,284
15	16	Sat, Nov 1	at Hamilton Tiger-Cats	L 10–26	5–10–1	Ivor Wynne Stadium	30,215

== Roster ==
1975 Toronto Argonauts final roster
Quarterbacks: 8 Gerry Dattilio; 18 Chuck Ealey; 13 Steve Joachim; 6 Mike Rae; Running backs: 31 Al Bloomingdale; 26 Dave Hadden; 11 Dickey Morton; 25 Doyle Orange; Wide receivers: 14 Al Charuk; 9 Mike Eben; 34 Chuck Herd; Tight ends: 72 Peter Muller; 77 Larry Simpson	Offensive linemen: 57 Wayne Cuncic T/G; 42 Stew Francis C; 65 Myke Horton G/T; 50 John Kennedy G; 59 Terry Shelsta G; 58 Tom Terhart T; 54 Dave Whiteside T; Defensive linemen: 56 Bill Belk DE; 52 Bart Buetow DE; 79 Jim Corrigall DE; 64 Garrett Hunsperger DT; 51 Granville Liggins DT; Special teams: 19 Zenon Andrusyshyn K/P	Linebackers: 75 George Anderson; 70 Ian Bryans; 33 Sam Cvijanovich; 76 Gene Mack; Defensive backs: 10 Roy Beechey; 12 Wayne Allison; 28 L. J. Clayton WR; 21 Steve Dennis; 27 Barry Finlay; 7 Larry Uteck; Injured list: 68 Jim Stillwagon DT; 44 Morris Zubkewych C; Italics indicate International player
