= 1974 Montreal Alouettes season =

Canadian football team season

- Head coach: Marv Levy
- Home stadium: Autostade

Results
- Record: 9–5–2
- Division place: 1st, East
- Playoffs: Won Grey Cup

Uniform

The 1974 Montreal Alouettes was the 17th season for the team in the Canadian Football League (CFL) and their 29th overall. They finished the season in first place in the East Conference with a 9–5–2 record and won the Grey Cup. They defeated their rival Edmonton Eskimos, in the first of five Grey Cups between the two in the 1970s. Sonny Wade came off the bench to lead his team to another Grey Cup on a rain-soaked field.

== Preseason ==
Game	Date	Opponent	Results		Venue	Attendance
Game	Date	Opponent	Score	Record	Venue	Attendance
A	July 2	vs. Hamilton Tiger-Cats	W 23–17	1–0	Autostade	6,000
A	July 4	at Winnipeg Blue Bombers	W 23–8	2–0	Winnipeg Stadium	16,500
B	July 12	vs. Toronto Argonauts	W 17–1	3–0	Autostade	8,604
C	July 17	at Hamilton Tiger-Cats	W 41–10	4–0	Ivor Wynne Stadium	20,471

== Regular season ==
=== Standings ===
Eastern Football Conference
Team	GP	W	L	T	PF	PA	Pts
Montreal Alouettes	16	9	5	2	339	271	20
Ottawa Rough Riders	16	7	9	0	261	271	14
Hamilton Tiger-Cats	16	7	9	0	279	313	14
Toronto Argonauts	16	6	9	1	281	314	13

=== Schedule ===
Week	Game	Date	Opponent	Results		Venue	Attendance
Week	Game	Date	Opponent	Score	Record	Venue	Attendance
1	1	July 24	vs. Hamilton Tiger-Cats	W 20–12	1–0	Autostade	15,246
2	2	July 31	vs. Ottawa Rough Riders	W 20–17	2–0	Autostade	15,732
3	3	Aug 7	at Toronto Argonauts	W 42–25	3–0	Exhibition Stadium	33,517
4	4	Aug 13	at Ottawa Rough Riders	L 14–27	3–1	Lansdowne Park	24,649
5	5	Aug 20	at Hamilton Tiger-Cats	L 7–11	3–2	Ivor Wynne Stadium	28,732
5	6	Aug 25	vs. Hamilton Tiger-Cats	W 29–10	4–2	Autostade	16,290
6	Bye						
7	7	Sept 3	at Toronto Argonauts	W 12–11	5–2	Exhibition Stadium	34,697
7	8	Sept 8	vs. Toronto Argonauts	W 38–6	6–2	Autostade	24,525
8	9	Sept 15	vs. BC Lions	W 31–12	7–2	Autostade	17,976
9	10	Sept 24	at Calgary Stampeders	L 13–38	7–3	McMahon Stadium	20,000
10	11	Sept 28	at Winnipeg Blue Bombers	L 15–24	7–4	Winnipeg Stadium	23,126
11	Bye						
12	12	Oct 8	vs. Edmonton Eskimos	T 28–28	7–4–1	Autostade	17,505
12	13	Oct 13	vs. Toronto Argonauts	T 13–13	7–4–2	Autostade	17,136
13	14	Oct 20	at Ottawa Rough Riders	W 28–0	8–4–2	Lansdowne Park	24,149
14	15	Oct 27	at Saskatchewan Roughriders	L 2–17	8–5–2	Taylor Field	22,394
15	16	Nov 2	vs. Ottawa Rough Riders	W 27–20	9–5–2	Autostade	

== Postseason ==
Round	Date	Opponent	Results		Venue	Attendance
Round	Date	Opponent	Score	Record	Venue	Attendance
East Final	Nov 17	vs. Ottawa Rough Riders	W 14–4	1–0	Autostade	20,531
Grey Cup	Nov 24	vs. Edmonton Eskimos	W 20–7	2–0	Empire Stadium	32,454

=== Grey Cup ===
Team	Q1	Q2	Q3	Q4	Total
Montreal Alouettes	0	11	3	6	20
Edmonton Eskimos	7	0	0	0	7

== Roster ==
1974 Montreal Alouettes final roster
Quarterbacks: 8 Jimmy Jones; 14 Sonny Wade P; Running backs: 33 Steve Ferrughelli; 15 Rudy Florio; 32 Larry Sherrer; 36 Larry Smith; Wide receivers: 26 Brian Baima; 10 Ian Mofford; 20 Johnny Rodgers; Tight ends: 74 Peter Dalla Riva	Offensive linemen: 50 Pat Bonnett T; 58 Dave Braggins G; 44 Wayne Conrad C/G; 62 Jerome Gantt T; 65 Ed George T; 55 Barry Randall T; 53 Doug Smith C/K; 52 Ray Watrin G/T; 67 Dan Yochum T; Defensive linemen: 77 Junior Ah You DE; 66 Joe Critchlow DT; 75 Gord Judges DE/DT; 64 Glen Weir DT; 79 Jake Zumbach DE	Linebackers: 39 Wally Buono; 21 Gary Chown; 72 Carl Crennel; 34 Mike Widger; 76 Chuck Zapiec; Defensive backs: 12 Art Edgson; 22 Gene Gaines; 18 Dickie Harris; 27 Marv Luster; 17 Phil Price; 23 Tony Proudfoot; 35 Ward Smith; Special teams: 11 Don Sweet K; Italics indicate American players
