= 1976 Calgary Stampeders season =

Canadian football team season

- Head coach: Bob Baker, Joe Tiller
- Home stadium: McMahon Stadium

Results
- Record: 2–12–2
- Division place: 5th, West
- Playoffs: did not qualify

The 1976 Calgary Stampeders finished in fifth place in the Western Conference with a 2–12–2 record and failed to make the playoffs.

== Regular season ==
=== Season standings ===
Western Football Conference
Team	GP	W	L	T	PF	PA	Pts
Saskatchewan Roughriders	16	11	5	0	427	238	22
Winnipeg Blue Bombers	16	10	6	0	384	316	20
Edmonton Eskimos	16	9	6	1	311	367	19
BC Lions	16	5	9	2	308	336	12
Calgary Stampeders	16	2	12	2	316	422	6

=== Season schedule ===
Week	Game	Date	Opponent	Results		Venue	Attendance
Week	Game	Date	Opponent	Score	Record	Venue	Attendance
	1		Edmonton Eskimos	L 22–24	0–1		
	2		Montreal Alouettes	T 20–20	0–1–1		
	3		Winnipeg Blue Bombers	L 3–49	0–2–1		
	4		BC Lions	L 9–13	0–3–1		
	5		Saskatchewan Roughriders	L 13–38	0–4–1		
	6		Hamilton Tiger-Cats	L 11–18	0–5–1		
	7		Edmonton Eskimos	L 17–19	0–6–1		
	8		BC Lions	L 15–30	0–7–1		
	9		Toronto Argonauts	L 20–28	0–8–1		
	10		Saskatchewan Roughriders	L 10–35	0–9–1		
	11		Winnipeg Blue Bombers	L 20–29	0–10–1		
	12		Winnipeg Blue Bombers	W 22–10	1–10–1		
	13		Ottawa Rough Riders	L 36–37	1–11–1		
	14		BC Lions	T 31–31	1–11–2		
	15		Edmonton Eskimos	W 36–28	2–11–2		
	16		Saskatchewan Roughriders	L 31–33	2–12–2		

== Roster ==
1976 Calgary Stampeders final roster
**Quarterbacks**: 16 John Hufnagel; 11 J. J. Jones; 7 Joe Pisarcik; **Running backs**: 10 Willie Burden; 26 Larry Cates DB; 21 Rick Galbos; 28 Chris Skopelianos; **Wide receivers**: 18 Willie Armstead; 22 Tom Forzani; 17 Rudy Linterman K; **Tight ends**: 70 Bob Viccars	**Offensive linemen**: 45 Basil Bark C; 52 Wayne Cuncic G; 66 Lloyd Fairbanks T; 54 John Forzani G; 57 Harry Holton G; 64 Max Huber T; 51 Bill Norton G; 46 Larry Tittley C; **Defensive linemen**: 77 John Helton DT; 75 Tom Higgins DT; 47 Andy Jonassen DE/DT; 60 Bob Martin DE; 61 Larry Moore DE; 63 Lorne Sherbina DT	**Linebackers**: 76 Jim Baker; 50 Ollie Bakken; 51 Gary Campbell; 30 Gary Mueller; 34 Bill Palmer P; **Defensive backs**: 27 Al Burleson; 14 John Dilworth; 25 Bob Hornes; 23 Dennis Meyer; 24 Melvin Wilson; **Special teams**: 20 Cyril McFall K/P; Italics indicate International player **Bold** indicates Global player

== Awards and records ==
=== 1976 CFL All-Stars ===
- DE – John Helton, CFL All-Star
