= Forzani =

Forzani is a surname. Notable people with the surname include:

- Joe Forzani (born 1945), Canadian football player
- John Forzani (1947–2014), Canadian businessman and football player
  - Forzani Group, a sporting goods company founded by John Forzani
- Johnny Forzani (born 1988), Canadian football player
- Liliana Forzani, Argentine applied mathematician and statistician
- Tom Forzani (born 1951), Canadian football player
