= 1976 Toronto Argonauts season =

CFL team season

- Head coach: Russ Jackson
- Home stadium: Exhibition Stadium

Results
- Record: 7–8–1
- Division place: 4th, East
- Playoffs: did not qualify

Uniform

The 1976 Toronto Argonauts finished in fourth place in the Eastern Conference with a 7–8–1 record and failed to make the playoffs.

== Regular season ==
=== Standings ===
Eastern Football Conference
Team	GP	W	L	T	PF	PA	Pts
Ottawa Rough Riders	16	9	6	1	411	346	19
Hamilton Tiger-Cats	16	8	8	0	269	348	16
Montreal Alouettes	16	7	8	1	305	273	15
Toronto Argonauts	16	7	8	1	289	354	15

=== Schedule ===
Week	Date	Opponent	Result	Record	Venue	Attendance
1	July 22	at Winnipeg Blue Bombers	W 22–16	1–0	Winnipeg Stadium	21,433
2	July 28	vs. Edmonton Eskimos	L 20–25	1–1	Exhibition Stadium	43,002
3	Aug 4	vs. Montreal Alouettes	W 23–10	2–1	Exhibition Stadium	44,920
4	Aug 11	vs. Ottawa Rough Riders	L 16–27	2–2	Exhibition Stadium	50,212
5	Aug 18	vs. Hamilton Tiger-Cats	W 14–11	3–2	Exhibition Stadium	49,724
5	Aug 23	at Montreal Alouettes	L 3–23	3–3	Autostade	25,802
6	Bye					
7	Sept 1	at Ottawa Rough Riders	L 27–40	3–4	Landsdowne Park	28,060
7	Sept 5	at Montreal Alouettes	L 0–28	3–5	Autostade	20,444
8	Sept 12	vs. Hamilton Tiger-Cats	W 31–22	4–5	Exhibition Stadium	48,250
9	Sept 18	at Calgary Stampeders	W 28–20	5–5	McMahon Stadium	23,378
10	Sept 25	at Hamilton Tiger-Cats	L 14–29	5–6	Ivor Wynne Stadium	31,793
11	Oct 2	vs. Ottawa Rough Riders	T 20–20	5–6–1	Exhibition Stadium	47,685
12	Oct 10	at Saskatchewan Roughriders	L 3–34	5–7–1	Taylor Field	22,140
13	Oct 17	vs. Montreal Alouettes	W 29–10	6–7–1	Exhibition Stadium	49,650
14	Bye					
15	Oct 30	vs. BC Lions	W 25–16	7–7–1	Exhibition Stadium	45,404
16	Nov 7	at Hamilton Tiger-Cats	L 14–23	7–8–1	Ivor Wynne Stadium	35,394

== Awards and honours ==
- Granville Liggins, James P. McCaffrey Trophy

== Roster ==
1976 Toronto Argonauts final roster
**Quarterbacks**: 18 Chuck Ealey; 8 Matthew Reed; **Running backs**: 28 Anthony Davis; 26 Dave Hadden; 30 John Harvey; 17 Gordie Knowlton LB; 32 Neil Lumsden K/P; **Wide receivers**: 10 Roy Beechey DB; 14 Al Charuk; 9 Mike Eben; **Tight ends**: 72 Peter Muller	**Offensive linemen**: 69 Justin Canale G; 58 Stew Francis G; 65 Wally Highsmith T; 50 John Kennedy T/G; 42 Doug MacIver C; 59 Terry Shelsta G; 56 Curtis Wester G/T; 44 Morris Zubkewych C; **Defensive linemen**: 62 Ecomet Burley DT; 79 Jim Corrigall DE; 51 Granville Liggins DT; 61 Bruce Smith DT/DE; 74 Cornelius Walker DE/DT	**Linebackers**: 75 George Anderson; 39 Tom Chandler; 68 Ron Foxx; **Defensive backs**: 12 Wayne Allison; 21 Steve Dennis; 27 Barry Finlay; 23 Alex Morris; 7 Larry Uteck; **Special teams**: 19 Zenon Andrusyshyn K/P; **Injured list**: -- Gene Clark G/T; Italics indicate International player **Bold** indicates Global player
