= 1975 Edmonton Eskimos season =

Canadian football team season

- Head coach: Ray Jauch
- Home stadium: Clarke Stadium

Results
- Record: 12–4
- Division place: 1st, West
- Playoffs: Won Grey Cup

Uniform

The 1975 Edmonton Eskimos finished in first place in the Western Conference with a 12–4 record and won the 63rd Grey Cup.

== Pre-season ==
=== Schedule ===
Game	Date	Opponent	Results		Venue	Attendance
Game	Date	Opponent	Score	Record	Venue	Attendance
A	Tue, July 1	vs. Ottawa Rough Riders	W 21–20	1–0	Clarke Stadium	
B	Tue, July 8	vs. Hamilton Tiger-Cats	W 30–14	2–0	Clarke Stadium	22,747
B	Mon, July 14	at Saskatchewan Roughriders	W 26–22	3–0	Taylor Field	15,781
C	Wed, July 16	at Calgary Stampeders	W 28–27	4–0	McMahon Stadium	23,508

== Regular season ==
=== Season standings ===
Western Football Conference
Team	GP	W	L	T	PF	PA	Pts
Edmonton Eskimos	16	12	4	0	432	370	24
Saskatchewan Roughriders	16	10	5	1	373	309	21
Winnipeg Blue Bombers	16	6	8	2	340	383	14
Calgary Stampeders	16	6	10	0	387	363	12
BC Lions	16	6	10	0	276	331	12

=== Season schedule ===
Week	Game	Date	Opponent	Results		Venue	Attendance
Week	Game	Date	Opponent	Score	Record	Venue	Attendance
1	Bye						
2	1	Tue, July 29	vs. Winnipeg Blue Bombers	W 28–22	1–0	Clarke Stadium	23,926
3	2	Wed, Aug 6	at Winnipeg Blue Bombers	L 16–17	1–1	Winnipeg Stadium	25,026
4	3	Thu, Aug 14	at BC Lions	W 27–24	2–1	Empire Stadium	18,688
5	4	Wed, Aug 20	vs. Toronto Argonauts	W 28–11	3–1	Clarke Stadium	24,636
6	5	Wed, Aug 27	vs. BC Lions	W 34–10	4–1	Clarke Stadium	24,843
6	6	Mon, Sept 1	at Calgary Stampeders	W 35–31	5–1	McMahon Stadium	27,188
7	7	Sat, Sept 6	vs. Saskatchewan Roughriders	W 28–24	6–1	Clarke Stadium	25,201
8	8	Sun, Sept 14	at Hamilton Tiger-Cats	W 17–3	7–1	Ivor Wynne Stadium	22,744
9	9	Wed, Sept 17	at Ottawa Rough Riders	L 25–38	7–2	Lansdowne Park	29,063
10	10	Tue, Sept 23	vs. Montreal Alouettes	W 31–29	8–2	Clarke Stadium	26,159
10	11	Sun, Sept 28	at Calgary Stampeders	W 37–36	9–2	McMahon Stadium	27,188
11	12	Sun, Oct 5	vs. Saskatchewan Roughriders	L 18–28	9–3	Clarke Stadium	26,303
12	13	Mon, Oct 13	vs. Calgary Stampeders	W 21–12	10–3	Clarke Stadium	26,147
13	14	Sun, Oct 19	at Saskatchewan Roughriders	L 27–36	10–4	Taylor Field	22,628
14	15	Sun, Oct 26	vs. Winnipeg Blue Bombers	W 41–48	11–4	Clarke Stadium	25,367
15	16	Sat, Nov 1	at BC Lions	W 12–8	12–4	Empire Stadium	15,765

Total attendance: 202,582
Average attendance: 25,323

== Playoffs ==
Round	Date	Opponent	Results		Venue	Attendance
Round	Date	Opponent	Score	Record	Venue	Attendance
Division Final	Sun, Nov 16	vs. Saskatchewan Roughriders	W 30–18	1–0	Clarke Stadium	25,671
Grey Cup	Sun, Nov 23	vs. Montreal Alouettes	W 9–8	2–0	McMahon Stadium	32,454

=== Grey Cup ===
Teams	1 Q	2 Q	3 Q	4 Q	Final
Montreal Alouettes	6	1	0	1	8
Edmonton Eskimos	0	3	6	0	9

== Roster ==
1975 Edmonton Eskimos final roster
Quarterbacks: 10 Bruce Lemmerman; 12 Tom Wilkinson; Running backs: 14 Roy Bell; 19 Calvin Harrell; 27 Don Layton; 21 Don Warrington; Wide receivers: 72 John Konihowski; 15 Stu Lang; 11 Garry Lefebvre; 76 George McGowan; Tight ends: 70 Don Muse; 75 Tyrone Walls	Offensive linemen: 53 Bob Howes C; 50 Willie Martin T; 51 Roger Scales G; 60 Charlie Turner G; 67 Larry Watkins T; 54 Joe Worobec G/T; Defensive linemen: 55 Ron Estay DE/P; 63 Dave Fennell DT; 47 Fred James DT; 73 Leroy Jones DE; 56 Ernie Kirk DE; 61 Tom Laputka DT; 62 Bill Stevenson DE	Linebackers: 42 Danny Kepley; 32 Mike Lambros; 44 Rob McLaren; 30 Dale Potter; 20 Tom Towns; Defensive backs: 71 John Beaton P/RB; 17 Dick Dupuis; 18 John Farlinger; 22 Mike Fink; 13 Larry Highbaugh; 7 Pete Lavorato; 8 Wayne Matherne; 28 Charlie Miller; 23 Bayne Norrie; Special teams: 26 Dave Cutler K	Injured list: 45 Sam Britts LB; Italics indicate American player.

=== Awards and honours ===
- CFL's Most Outstanding Offensive Lineman Award – Charlie Turner
