= 1974 Ottawa Rough Riders season =

Canadian football team season

- Owner: David Loeb
- General manager: Frank Clair
- Head coach: George Brancato
- Home stadium: Lansdowne Park

Results
- Record: 7–9
- Division place: 2nd, East
- Playoffs: Lost Eastern Final

Uniform

The 1974 Ottawa Rough Riders finished in second place in the Eastern Conference with a 7–9 record. Head coach Jack Gotta left the Rough Riders to become the head coach of the Birmingham Americans in the World Football League.

== Preseason ==
Game	Date	Opponent	Results		Venue	Attendance
Game	Date	Opponent	Score	Record	Venue	Attendance
A	Wed, July 3	at Calgary Stampeders	W 29–20	1–0	McMahon Stadium	18,000
A	Fri, July 5	at Edmonton Eskimos	W 26–25	2–0	Clarke Stadium	
B	Wed, July 10	vs. BC Lions	W 28–27	3–0	Lansdowne Park	12,221
C	Thu, July 18	vs. Winnipeg Blue Bombers	W 27–16	4–0	Lansdowne Park	12,424

== Regular season ==
=== Standings ===
Eastern Football Conference
Team	GP	W	L	T	PF	PA	Pts
Montreal Alouettes	16	9	5	2	339	271	20
Ottawa Rough Riders	16	7	9	0	261	271	14
Hamilton Tiger-Cats	16	7	9	0	279	313	14
Toronto Argonauts	16	6	9	1	281	314	13

=== Schedule ===
Week	Game	Date	Opponent	Results		Venue	Attendance
Week	Game	Date	Opponent	Score	Record	Venue	Attendance
1	1	Thu, July 25	at Toronto Argonauts	L 3–19	0–1	Exhibition Stadium	32,485
2	2	Wed, July 31	at Montreal Alouettes	L 17–20	0–2	Autostade	15,732
3	3	Tue, Aug 6	vs. Hamilton Tiger-Cats	W 30–25	1–2	Lansdowne Park	19,133
4	4	Tue, Aug 13	vs. Montreal Alouettes	W 27–14	2–2	Lansdowne Park	24,649
4	5	Mon, Aug 19	at Edmonton Eskimos	L 6–23	2–3	Clarke Stadium	21,966
5	6	Thu, Aug 22	at BC Lions	W 9–4	3–3	Empire Stadium	26,803
6	7	Mon, Sept 2	at Hamilton Tiger-Cats	L 10–11	3–4	Ivor Wynne Stadium	28,050
7	8	Sat, Sept 7	vs. Hamilton Tiger-Cats	L 10–16	3–5	Lansdowne Park	18,612
8	9	Sat, Sept 14	vs. Calgary Stampeders	L 9–16	3–6	Lansdowne Park	14,396
9	10	Thu, Sept 19	at Toronto Argonauts	W 29–12	4–6	Exhibition Stadium	32,081
9	11	Sun, Sept 22	vs. Saskatchewan Roughriders	W 24–6	5–6	Lansdowne Park	16,048
10	12	Sun, Sept 29	vs. Toronto Argonauts	L 7–19	5–7	Lansdowne Park	18,902
11	13	Sun, Oct 6	at Hamilton Tiger-Cats	W 33–21	6–7	Ivor Wynne Stadium	26,055
12	14	Sat, Oct 12	vs. Winnipeg Blue Bombers	W 27–10	7–7	Lansdowne Park	15,500
13	15	Sun, Oct 20	vs. Montreal Alouettes	L 0–28	7–8	Lansdowne Park	24,149
14	Bye						
15	16	Sat, Nov 2	at Montreal Alouettes	L 20–27	7–9	Autostade	16,311

== Postseason ==
Round	Date	Opponent	Results		Venue	Attendance
Round	Date	Opponent	Score	Record	Venue	Attendance
East Semi-Final	Sun, Nov 10	vs. Hamilton Tiger-Cats	W 21–19	8–9	Lansdowne Park	14,786
East Final	Sun, Nov 17	at Montreal Alouettes	L 4–14	8–10	Autostade	20,531

== Player stats ==
=== Passing ===
Player	Attempts	Completions	Pct.	Yards	Touchdowns	Interceptions
Rick Cassata	210	88	41.9	1254	4	13

=== Rushing ===
Player	Rushes	Yards	Average	Touchdowns	Long
Art Green	141	680	4.8	3	34

== Roster ==
1974 Ottawa Rough Riders final roster
Quarterbacks: 16 Rick Cassata; 14 Jerry Keeling; Running backs: 30 John Bledsoe; 28 Jim Evenson; 9 Jim Foley; 20 Art Green; 15 Kerry Marbury; Receivers: 27 Hugh Oldham; 71 Gerry Organ K; 77 Tom Pullen; 74 Rhome Nixon; 76 Tom Schultz; 25 Merv Visneskie	Offensive linemen: 66 Doug Collins T; 60 Jim Coode T; 42 Bob McKeown C; 51 Roger Perdrix G; 62 Moe Racine T; 43 Frank Reid T; 56 Tom Schuette G; 64 Donn Smith C/T; Defensive linemen: 61 Charlie Brandon DT; 73 Jim Piaskoski DE; 65 Rudy Sims DT; 75 Wayne Smith DE; 63 Carl Taylor DT/DE	Linebackers: 24 Perry Arnold; 54 Jerry Campbell; 21 Wayne Giardino FB; 50 Mark Kosmos; 18 Bill Palmer; Defensive backs: 33 Dickie Adams P; 10 Peter Crepin; 3 John Kruspe; 31 Al Marcelin; 17 Wayne Tosh; 26 Rod Woodward; Italics indicate International player

== Awards and honours ==
- Dick Adams, Defensive Back, CFL All-Star
- Jerry Campbell, Linebacker, CFL All-Star
- Al Marcelin, Defensive Back, CFL All-Star
- Rudy Sims, Defensive Tackle, CFL All-Star
- Legendary Rough Riders quarterback Russ Jackson was inducted into the Canadian Football Hall of Fame
