= 1974 Hamilton Tiger-Cats season =

Season of Canadian Football League team the Hamilton Tiger-Cats

- Head coach: Jerry Williams
- Home stadium: Ivor Wynne Stadium

Results
- Record: 7–9
- Division place: 3rd, East
- Playoffs: Lost Eastern Semi-Final
- Team MOP: Andy Hopkins
- Team MOC: Tony Gabriel
- Team MOR: George Campbell

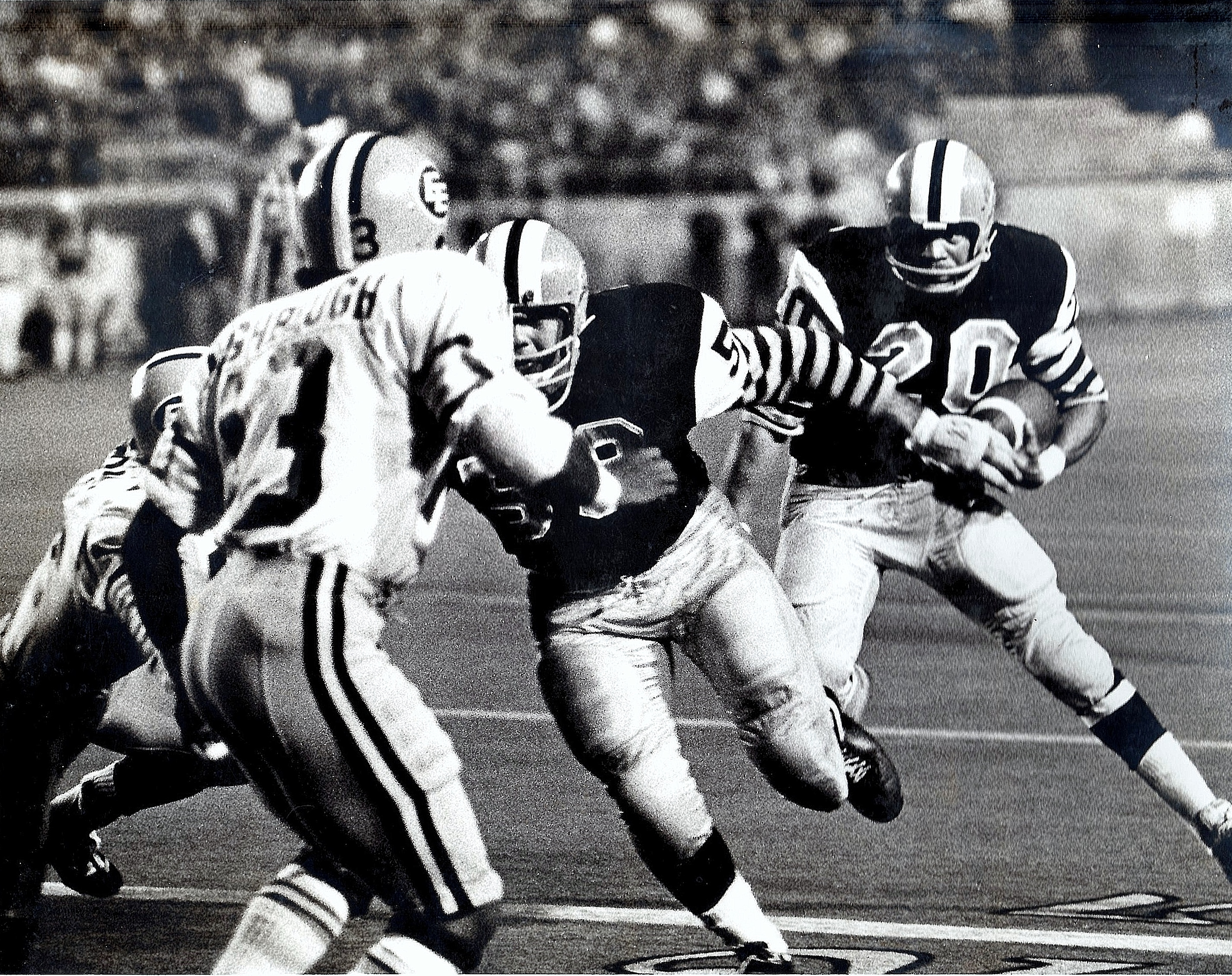
Andy Hopkins as a Tiger-Cat in 1974 (right)

The 1974 Hamilton Tiger-Cats season was the 17th season for the team in the Canadian Football League (CFL) and their 25th overall. The Tiger-Cats finished in third place in the Eastern Conference with a 7–9 record, but lost the Eastern Semi-Final to the Ottawa Rough Riders. In 1974, Tony Gabriel had a career year as he caught 61 passes for 795 yards to lead the East in pass receiving. It was also Gabriel's last season in Hamilton. Hamilton sent Gabriel to the Ottawa Rough Riders at the end of the season because Gabriel suggested that the players should get a raise when the East increased the number of games played from 14 to 16 in 1974.

== Regular season ==
=== Season standings ===
Eastern Football Conference
Team	GP	W	L	T	PF	PA	Pts
Montreal Alouettes	16	9	5	2	339	271	20
Ottawa Rough Riders	16	7	9	0	261	271	14
Hamilton Tiger-Cats	16	7	9	0	279	313	14
Toronto Argonauts	16	6	9	1	281	314	13

=== Season schedule ===
Week	Game	Date	Opponent	Result	Record	Venue	Attendance
1	1	July 24	at Montreal Alouettes	L 12–20	0–1		
2	2	July 30	vs. Toronto Argonauts	W 29–22	1–1		
3	3	Aug 6	at Ottawa Rough Riders	L 25–30	1–2		
4	4	Aug 14	at Toronto Argonauts	L 6–17	1–3		
5	5	Aug 20	vs. Montreal Alouettes	W 11–7	2–3		
5	6	Aug 25	at Montreal Alouettes	L 10–29	2–4		
6	7	Sept 2	vs. Ottawa Rough Riders	W 11–10	3–4		
7	8	Sept 7	at Ottawa Rough Riders	W 16–10	4–4		
8	9	Sept 11	vs. Calgary Stampeders	W 27–0	5–4		
9	10	Sept 18	vs. Saskatchewan Roughriders	W 23–10	6–4		
10	11	Sept 25	at Edmonton Eskimos	L 29–31	6–5		
10	12	Sept 29	at BC Lions	L 10–32	6–6		
11	13	Oct 6	vs. Ottawa Rough Riders	L 21–33	6–7		
12	14	Oct 14	vs. Winnipeg Blue Bombers	L 12–19	6–8		
13	Bye						
14	15	Oct 27	at Toronto Argonauts	L 11–19	6–9		
15	16	Nov 3	vs. Toronto Argonauts	W 26–24	7–9		

== Post-season ==
Game	Date	Opponent	Result	Record	Venue	Attendance
Eastern Semi-Final	Nov 10	at Ottawa Rough Riders	L 19–21	0–1	Lansdowne Park	

== Roster ==
1974 Hamilton Tiger-Cats final roster
**Quarterbacks**: 10 Bill Etter; 7 Don Jonas; **Running backs**: 21 Dave Fleming; 20 Andy Hopkins; 22 Mike Walker; **Wide receivers**: 11 Terry Evanshen; 26 Garney Henley; 70 Gary Kuzyk; **Tight ends**: 72 Tony Gabriel; 71 Bob Richardson	**Offensive linemen**: 58 Ed Chalupka G; 65 Andy Currie T; 55 Bill Danychuk T/G; 52 Ken Ferguson C; 57 Bill Langner C; 56 Willie Postler C; 64 Harold Terrell C; **Defensive linemen**: 61 Ezil Bibbs; 54 Richard Bishop; 67 Dan Dulmage; 63 Fred Grambau; 68 Marion Latimore; 62 Mike Samples	**Linebackers**: 37 Dick Aldridge; 47 Larry Brame; 14 Bob Krouse; 39 Jamie Rotella; **Defensive backs**: 25 Al Brenner; 17 Tommy Campbell; 31 Lou Clare; 19 Dave Easley; 24 Lewis Porter; **Special teams**: 36 Ian Sunter K/P; Italics indicate American players **Bold** indicates Global players

=== Awards and honours ===
- CFL's Most Outstanding Canadian Award – Tony Gabriel (TE)
- Former Ticats quarterback Bernie Faloney was inducted into the Canadian Football Hall of Fame on May 6, 1974.

==== CFL All-Stars ====
- Tony Gabriel, Tight End
