= 1976 Ottawa Rough Riders season =

Canadian football team season

- Owner: David Loeb
- General manager: Frank Clair
- Head coach: George Brancato
- Home stadium: Lansdowne Park

Results
- Record: 9–6–1
- Division place: 1st, East
- Playoffs: Won Grey Cup

Uniform

The 1976 Ottawa Rough Riders finished in first place in the Eastern Conference with a 9–6–1 record and won the 64th Grey Cup. This would be the last time in their franchise history that they would win the Grey Cup. The Ottawa Redblacks would subsequently win the 104th Grey Cup game at the conclusion of the 2016 CFL season, ending a 40-year Grey Cup drought for the City of Ottawa, which begun subsequent to their Grey Cup victory in 1976 (this ended what was arguably the longest Grey Cup drought in the CFL, though the City of Ottawa was without a CFL team between 1997 and 2001 and again between 2006 and 2013).

== Offseason ==
=== 1976 CFL draft ===
In the first round of the 1976 CFL Draft, Ottawa selected Bill Hatanaka. Bob O'Billovich was hired as an assistant coach.

== Preseason ==
Week	Date	Opponent	Result	Record
A	June 28	vs. Edmonton Eskimos	W 40–25	1–0
B	July 5	vs. Montreal Alouettes	L 22–26	1–1
C	July 8	at Calgary Stampeders	L 37–39	1–2
D	July 14	at Toronto Argonauts	W 20–9	2–2

== Regular season ==
=== Standings ===
Eastern Football Conference
Team	GP	W	L	T	PF	PA	Pts
Ottawa Rough Riders	16	9	6	1	411	346	19
Hamilton Tiger-Cats	16	8	8	0	269	348	16
Montreal Alouettes	16	7	8	1	305	273	15
Toronto Argonauts	16	7	8	1	289	354	15

=== Schedule ===
Week	Game	Date	Opponent	Result	Record
1	1	July 21	at Hamilton Tiger-Cats	W 42–16	1–0
2	2	July 27	vs. Winnipeg Blue Bombers	W 38–27	2–0
3	3	Aug 3	vs. Saskatchewan Roughriders	L 16–29	2–1
4	4	Aug 11	at Toronto Argonauts	W 27–16	3–1
4	5	Aug 16	vs. Montreal Alouettes	W 45–9	4–1
5	6	Aug 21	at Edmonton Eskimos	W 20–18	5–1
6	7	Aug 24	at BC Lions	L 11–23	5–2
7	8	Sept 1	vs. Toronto Argonauts	W 40–27	6–2
8	9	Sept 11	vs. Montreal Alouettes	W 21–13	7–2
9	10	Sept 19	vs. Hamilton Tiger-Cats	L 21–28	7–3
10	11	Sept 26	at Montreal Alouettes	L 2–23	7–4
11	12	Oct 2	at Toronto Argonauts	T 20–20	7–4–1
12	Bye				
13	13	Oct 16	vs. Calgary Stampeders	W 37–36	8–4–1
14	14	Oct 24	at Hamilton Tiger-Cats	W 48–10	9–4–1
15	15	Oct 31	vs. Hamilton Tiger-Cats	L 6–25	9–5–1
16	16	Nov 6	at Montreal Alouettes	L 17–26	9–6–1

== Postseason ==
=== Playoffs ===
Round	Date	Opponent	Result	Record
East Final	Nov 21	vs. Hamilton Tiger-Cats	W 17–15	1–0
Grey Cup	Nov 28	vs. Saskatchewan Roughriders	W 23–20	2–0

=== Grey Cup ===
In the final minute, Saskatchewan punted into a strong wind. Ottawa would have the ball on the Saskatchewan 35-yard line. With 44 seconds left, Ottawa quarterback Tom Clements passed to tight end Tony Gabriel, and Ottawa was at Saskatchewan's 20 yard line. The next pass would win the game, as Gabriel caught the ball in the end zone for the game-winning touchdown.

Teams	1 Q	2 Q	3 Q	4 Q	Final
Saskatchewan Roughriders	0	17	3	0	20
Ottawa Rough Riders	10	0	3	10	23

== Player stats ==
=== Passing ===
Player	Attempts	Completions	Percentage	Yards	Touchdowns	Interceptions
Tom Clements	327	196	59.9	2856	20	13
Condredge Holloway	106	59	55.7	973	9	6

=== Receiving ===
Player	Games played	Receptions	Yards	Average	Long	Touchdowns
Jeff Avery	16	21	338	16.1	62	2
Tony Gabriel	16	72	1320	18.3	62	14
Art Green		53	508	9.6	31	2

=== Rushing ===
Player	Rushes	Yards	Average	Touchdowns	Long
Art Green	234	1257	5.4	13	69

== Roster ==
1976 Ottawa Rough Riders final roster
Quarterbacks: 2 Tom Clements; 7 Condredge Holloway; Running backs: 9 Jim Foley; 20 Art Green; Wide receivers: 18 Jeff Avery; 16 Bill Hatanaka; 1 Moody Jackson; 27 Gary Kuzyk; 71 Gerry Organ K/P; Tight ends: 77 Tony Gabriel; 37 Paul Moses	Offensive linemen: 60 Jim Coode T; 56 Tom Schuette G; 64 Donn Smith C; 67 Jeff Turcotte T; 52 Tuufuli Uperesa G; Defensive linemen: 76 Marv Allemang DE; 61 Charlie Brandon DT; 68 Mike Fanucci DE; 53 Brian Hedges DT; 57 Kenny Moore DE; 73 Jim Piaskoski DE; 78 Mike Raines DT; 65 Rudy Sims DT	Linebackers: 52 Larry Cameron; 50 Mark Kosmos; 21 John Palazeti FB; Defensive backs: 25 Merl Code; 13 Al Brenner; 33 Doug Falconer; 31 Wonder Monds; 3 Billy Robinson QB; 23 Pete Stenerson; 17 Wayne Tosh; 26 Rod Woodward; Injured list: 10 Peter Crepin DB; Italics indicate International player

== Awards and honours ==
- CFL's Most Outstanding Canadian Award – Tony Gabriel (TE)
- Grey Cup Most Valuable Player, Tom Clements, (QB)
- Tom Clements, All-Eastern Quarterback
- Art Green, Running Back, CFL All-Star
- Tony Gabriel, Tight End, CFL All-Star
- Mark Kosmos, Linebacker, CFL All-Star
- Jim Reid, Fullback, Rookie of the Year Award
