= Victor Prus =

Canadian architect

Victor Marius Prus (24 April 1917 in Mińsk Mazowiecki (Poland) – 21 January 2017 in Montreal) was a Polish-Canadian architect. He designed several major buildings in Quebec which won many prizes, such as the Grand Théâtre de Québec in Quebec City; his designs were chosen from those of several entries in a national competition in 1964. With his wife Maria Fisz Prus and many collaborators, he designed buildings remarkable for their characteristic and appropriate "ambiance", which, according to Prus, was the "ultimate objective" of architecture.

His principal completed commissions include:

- The first Rockland Centre Mall, Montreal (1960)
- Savoy Apartments, Montreal (1962)
- Autostade, Montreal (1966), with Maurice Desnoyers
- Mont-Royal metro station, Montreal (1966)
- Bonaventure metro station, Montreal (1967)
- St. Augustine's Church, Saint-Bruno-de-Montarville (1966-1967)
- Royal Canadian Air Force Memorial at the National Air Force Museum of Canada in Trenton, Ontario (1969)
- The Grand Théâtre de Québec (1964–70)
- Conservatoire de musique du Québec (1971)
- The Canada–France–Hawaii Telescope (CFHT) at Mauna Kea, Hawaii (1977)
- The rebuilt Place Longueuil Mall, Longueuil (1981)
- Barbados International Airport
- The Palais des Congrès (Convention Centre) in Montreal (1979–83)
