= 1975 Ottawa Rough Riders season =

Canadian football team season

- Owner: David Loeb
- General manager: Frank Clair
- Head coach: George Brancato
- Home stadium: Lansdowne Park

Results
- Record: 10–5–1
- Division place: 1st, East
- Playoffs: Lost Eastern Final

Uniform

The 1975 Ottawa Rough Riders finished in first place in the Eastern Conference with a 10–5–1 record.

== Offseason ==
The Hamilton Tiger-Cats sent Tony Gabriel off to the Rough Riders because Gabriel suggested that the players should get a raise when the East increased the number of games played from 14 to 16 in 1974. Gabriel would lead the Rough Riders and the Eastern Division in receiving.

=== Quarterback controversy ===
Jerry Keeling was projected as the starting quarterback for the Rough Riders while Tennessee's Condredge Holloway was expected to be the quarterback of the future. Holloway was selected in the 12th round of the 1975 NFL draft by New England Patriots but they were projecting him only as a wide receiver or defensive back.

General Manager Frank Clair made five trips to try to get Holloway signed. Clair also pursued another well known college quarterback, Notre Dame Fighting Irish quarterback Tom Clements. Clements had just been dropped from the Winnipeg Blue Bombers negotiation list and following a substantial bonus offer, signed with Ottawa. After the acquisition of Clements, Holloway soon signed with the club.

Bill Robinson, a Canadian quarterback who led schools to appearances in the 1973 and 1974 Vanier Cup was trying to earn a spot on the roster as a quarterback.

Robinson competed for the spot against Clements and Holloway. Before training camp, Robinson was treated poorly by the organization as his $13,000 contract was mailed to him. The contract stated that there was no signing bonus and no negotiation.

Tony Gabriel stated that Robinson was the best passer in camp. Even Tom Clements stated that Robinson threw better than him. In an intra squad game, Robinson completed 10 of 13 passes. In his first preseason game, Robinson completed 3 of 6 passes, included a 48-yard pass to Tony Gabriel.

In the three remaining preseason games, Robinson only had 8 minutes of playing time. CFLPA president George Reed was furious at the Rough Riders organization. Fans were highly critical of the poor treatment that Robinson received. The problem was that the Rough Riders guaranteed the contracts of Clements and Holloway. Robinson would be placed on the 21-day injury list with tonsillitis although his tonsils had been removed years earlier. He would make the team as a defensive back and special teams player. Surprisingly, Holloway and Clements developed so quickly that Brancato decided to trade Keeling to the Hamilton Tiger-Cats prior to the season-opener.

== Preseason ==
Game	Date	Opponent	Results		Venue	Attendance
Game	Date	Opponent	Score	Record	Venue	Attendance
A	Tue, July 1	at Edmonton Eskimos	L 20–21	0–1	Clarke Stadium	
A	Thu, July 3	at BC Lions	L 31–41	0–2	Empire Stadium	14,334
B	Wed, July 9	vs. Saskatchewan Roughriders	W 20–16	1–2	Lansdowne Park	17,022
C	Wed, July 16	vs. Hamilton Tiger-Cats	L 19–21	1–3	Lansdowne Park	18,040

== Regular season ==
=== Standings ===
Eastern Football Conference
Team	GP	W	L	T	PF	PA	Pts
Ottawa Rough Riders	16	10	5	1	394	280	21
Montreal Alouettes	16	9	7	0	353	345	18
Hamilton Tiger-Cats	16	5	10	1	284	395	11
Toronto Argonauts	16	5	10	1	261	324	11

=== Schedule ===
Week	Game	Date	Opponent	Results		Venue	Attendance
Week	Game	Date	Opponent	Score	Record	Venue	Attendance
1	1	Thu, July 24	at Toronto Argonauts	W 18–16	1–0	Exhibition Stadium	36,912
2	2	Wed, July 30	at Hamilton Tiger-Cats	W 31–9	2–0	Ivor Wynne Stadium	24,249
3	3	Wed, Aug 6	vs. Toronto Argonauts	L 14–16	2–1	Lansdowne Park	31,023
4	4	Tue, Aug 12	vs. Montreal Alouettes	L 31–34	2–2	Lansdowne Park	31,688
5	5	Thu, Aug 21	at Calgary Stampeders	L 6–23	2–3	McMahon Stadium	25,878
5	6	Sun, Aug 24	at Saskatchewan Roughriders	W 23–16	3–3	Taylor Field	20,111
6	Bye						
7	7	Wed, Sept 3	at Montreal Alouettes	W 17–11	4–3	Autostade	25,225
7	8	Sun, Sept 7	vs. Hamilton Tiger-Cats	W 56–31	5–3	Lansdowne Park	27,259
8	9	Sat, Sept 13	at Montreal Alouettes	L 13–19	5–4	Autostade	28,879
9	10	Wed, Sept 17	vs. Edmonton Eskimos	W 38–25	6–4	Lansdowne Park	29,063
10	11	Sun, Sept 27	vs. Toronto Argonauts	W 13–9	7–4	Lansdowne Park	28,810
11	12	Wed, Oct 1	at Hamilton Tiger-Cats	W 16–11	8–4	Ivor Wynne Stadium	20,221
12	13	Wed, Oct 8	vs. Hamilton Tiger-Cats	W 31–4	9–4	Lansdowne Park	22,647
13	14	Sun, Oct 19	at Winnipeg Blue Bombers	T 25–25	9–4–1	Winnipeg Stadium	23,721
14	15	Sat, Oct 25	vs. BC Lions	L 15–25	9–5–1	Lansdowne Park	19,002
15	16	Sun, Nov 2	vs. Montreal Alouettes	W 46–6	10–5–1	Lansdowne Park	35,342

== Postseason ==
Game	Date	Opponent	Results		Venue	Attendance
Game	Date	Opponent	Score	Record	Venue	Attendance
East Final	Mon, Nov 17	vs. Montreal Alouettes	L 10–20	10–6–1	Lansdowne Park	32,699

== Player stats ==
=== Passing ===
Player	Attempts	Completions	Percentage	Yards	Touchdowns	Interceptions
Tom Clements	252	144	57.1	2013	13	13
Condredge Holloway	148	60	40.5	984	6	9

=== Receiving ===
Player	Games Played	Receptions	Yards	Average	Long	Touchdowns
Tony Gabriel	16	65	1115	17.2	46	10
Art Green		47	537	11.4	39	3

=== Rushing ===
Player	Rushes	Yards	Average	Touchdowns	Long
Art Green	258	1188	4.6	11	47

== Awards and honours ==
- CFL's Most Outstanding Canadian Award – Jim Foley (WR)
- CFL's Most Outstanding Rookie Award – Tom Clements (QB)
- CFL's Coach of the Year – George Brancato
- Tom Clements, Frank M. Gibson Trophy
- Tom Clements, All-Eastern Quarterback

== Roster ==
1975 Ottawa Rough Riders final roster
Quarterbacks: 2 Tom Clements; 7 Condredge Holloway; Running backs: 15 Joe Colvey; 9 Jim Foley; 20 Art Green; 32 Molly McGee; Wide receivers: 16 Moody Jackson; 22 Gary Kuzyk; 71 Gerry Organ K; 23 Pete Stenerson; Tight ends: 77 Tony Gabriel; 74 Rhome Nixon	Offensive linemen: 60 Jim Coode T/G; 42 Bob McKeown C; 51 Steve Neece G; 43 Frank Reid T; 56 Tom Schuette G; 64 Donn Smith C/T; 67 Jeff Turcotte T; 52 Tuufuli Uperesa G; Defensive linemen: 76 Marv Allemang DE; 61 Charlie Brandon DT; 73 Jim Piaskoski DT; 79 Mike Raines DE/DT; 65 Rudy Sims DT; 75 Wayne Smith DE	Linebackers: 54 Jerry Campbell; 63 Kent Carter; 21 Wayne Giardino; 50 Mark Kosmos; Defensive backs: 33 Dickie Adams P; 13 Al Brenner; 10 Peter Crepin; 31 Al Marcelin; 3 Billy Robinson QB; 17 Wayne Tosh; 26 Rod Woodward; Italics indicate International player
