= 1974 Toronto Argonauts season =

CFL team season

- Head coach: John Rauch and Joe Moss
- Home stadium: Exhibition Stadium

Results
- Record: 6–9–1
- Division place: 4th, East
- Playoffs: did not qualify

Uniform

The 1974 Toronto Argonauts finished in fourth place in the Eastern Conference with a 6–9–1 record and failed to make the playoffs.

== Offseason ==
=== CFL draft ===
The Toronto Argonauts drafted the following players in the 1974 CFL draft.

| Round | Pick | Player | Position | School |
|---|---|---|---|---|
| T | T | Larry Uteck | Defensive back | Wilfrid Laurier |
| T | T | Morris Zubkewych | Defensive tackle | Simon Fraser |
| 1 | 1 | Randy Halsall | Tackle | Wake Forest |
| 1 | 5 | Larry Simpson | Tight end | Wilfrid Laurier |
| 2 | 10 | Rick Konopka | Linebacker | Wilfrid Laurier |
| 3 | 23 | Bill Baker | Defensive back | UBC |
| 4 | 32 | Wayne Sudsbury | Linebacker | Mount Allison |
| 5 | 41 | Heinz Brademan | Defensive tackle | Alberta |
| 6 | 46 | Jay Chapman | Defensive end | Western Ontario |
| 6 | 50 | John Dionisi | Wide receiver | Acadia |
| 7 | 59 | Bob Spree | Quarterback | Waterloo |
| 8 | 68 | John Wintermeyer | Tailback | Queen's |
| 9 | 76 | Tom Graham | Center | Guelph |

== Regular season ==
=== Standings ===
Eastern Football Conference
| Team | GP | W | L | T | PF | PA | Pts |
|---|---|---|---|---|---|---|---|
| Montreal Alouettes | 16 | 9 | 5 | 2 | 339 | 271 | 20 |
| Ottawa Rough Riders | 16 | 7 | 9 | 0 | 261 | 271 | 14 |
| Hamilton Tiger-Cats | 16 | 7 | 9 | 0 | 279 | 313 | 14 |
| Toronto Argonauts | 16 | 6 | 9 | 1 | 281 | 314 | 13 |

=== Schedule ===
| Week | Date | Opponent | Result | Record | Venue | Attendance |
| 1 | July 25 | vs. Ottawa Rough Riders | W 19–3 | 1–0 | Exhibition Stadium | 32,485 |
| 2 | July 30 | at Hamilton Tiger-Cats | L 22–29 | 1–1 | Ivor Wynne Stadium | 28,391 |
| 3 | Aug 7 | vs. Montreal Alouettes | L 25–42 | 1–2 | Exhibition Stadium | 33,157 |
| 4 | Aug 14 | vs. Hamilton Tiger-Cats | W 17–6 | 2–2 | Exhibition Stadium | 33,157 |
| 5 | Aug 21 | at Winnipeg Blue Bombers | L 13–18 | 2–3 | Winnipeg Stadium | 21,139 |
| 5 | Aug 25 | at Saskatchewan Roughriders | W 17–13 | 3–3 | Taylor Field | 18,688 |
| 6 | Bye | | | | | |
| 7 | Sept 3 | vs. Montreal Alouettes | L 11–12 | 3–4 | Exhibition Stadium | 34,697 |
| 7 | Sept 8 | at Montreal Alouettes | L 6–38 | 3–5 | Autostade | 24,525 |
| 8 | Sept 12 | vs. BC Lions | L 24–26 | 3–6 | Exhibition Stadium | 32,782 |
| 9 | Sept 19 | vs. Ottawa Rough Riders | L 12–29 | 3–7 | Exhibition Stadium | 32,081 |
| 10 | Sept 29 | at Ottawa Rough Riders | W 19–7 | 4–7 | Landsdowne Park | 18,902 |
| 11 | Oct 5 | vs. Edmonton Eskimos | W 22–20 | 5–7 | Exhibition Stadium | 32,614 |
| 12 | Oct 13 | at Montreal Alouettes | T 13–13 | 5–7–1 | Autostade | 17,136 |
| 13 | Oct 20 | at Calgary Stampeders | L 18–21 | 5–8–1 | McMahon Stadium | 18,555 |
| 14 | Oct 27 | vs. Hamilton Tiger-Cats | W 19–11 | 6–8–1 | Exhibition Stadium | 35,007 |
| 15 | Nov 3 | at Hamilton Tiger-Cats | L 24–26 | 6–9–1 | Ivor Wynne Stadium | 32,790 |

== Roster ==
1974 Toronto Argonauts final roster
| Quarterbacks: 5 Jim Lindsey; 6 Mike Rae; Running backs: 31 Emory Blake; 17 Ernie Carnegie; 25 Doyle Orange; 30 Ed Shuttlesworth; Wide receivers: 23 Eric Allen; 10 Roy Beechey; 9 Mike Eben; 34 Chuck Herd; Tight ends: 72 Peter Muller; 77 Larry Simpson | Offensive linemen: 65 Billy Corbett T; 57 Wayne Cuncic G; 58 Stew Francis G; 56 Noah Jackson T; 62 Paul Krause T; 59 Terry Shelsta G; 44 Morris Zubkewych C; Defensive linemen: 52 Bart Buetow DE; 79 Jim Corrigall DE; 51 Granville Liggins DT; 69 Farris Scott DE; 68 Jim Stillwagon DT | Linebackers: 75 George Anderson; 33 Sam Cvijanovich; 71 Rick Konopka; 76 Gene Mack; Defensive backs: 12 Wayne Allison; 26 Tim Anderson; 16 Billy Cooper; 8 Cor Doret; 27 Barry Finlay; 14 Dave Raimey; 7 Larry Uteck; Special teams: 19 Zenon Andrusyshyn K/P; Italics indicate International player |

== Awards and honors ==
- Sam Cvijanovich (LB), CFL's Most Outstanding Rookie Award
- Jim Stillwagon, Defense, CFL All-Stars
