= Anthony Davis (running back, born 1952) =

American gridiron football player (born 1952)

No. 28
- Position: Running back

Personal information
- Born: September 8, 1952 (age 74); Huntsville, Texas, U.S.
- Listed height: 5 ft 10 in (1.78 m)
- Listed weight: 190 lb (86 kg)

Career information
- High school: San Fernando (Los Angeles, California)
- College: USC
- NFL draft: 1975: 2nd round, 37th overall pick

Career history
- 1975: Southern California Sun
- 1976: Toronto Argonauts
- 1977: Tampa Bay Buccaneers
- 1978: Houston Oilers
- 1978: Los Angeles Rams
- 1983: Los Angeles Express

Awards and highlights
- All-WFL (1975); 2× National champion (1972, 1974); Unanimous All-American (1974); Second-team All-American (1972); Pop Warner Trophy (1974); 3× First-team All-Pac-8 (1972, 1973, 1974)
- Stats at Pro Football Reference
- College Football Hall of Fame

Anthony Davis (born September 8, 1952), also known as "A.D.", is an American former professional football player who was a running back in four professional leagues: the World Football League (WFL), Canadian Football League (CFL), National Football League (NFL), and United States Football League (USFL).

Davis played college football and baseball at the University of Southern California (USC), where he was part of five national championships, two in football and three in baseball.

== College career ==
Davis was a consensus All-American in 1974, and led the USC Trojans in rushing, scoring and kick return yardage for three consecutive seasons. He is especially remembered for scoring 11 touchdowns in three games against Notre Dame. In a 45–23 USC win on December 2, 1972, he scored six touchdowns which set a school single game record. Two of those scores came on kickoff returns. He returned the opening kickoff 97 yards for a touchdown after Notre Dame won the coin toss and chose to kick. After Notre Dame scored on a short pass and narrowed the Trojans' lead, he returned the following kickoff 96 yards for a touchdown. In this game, Davis had three kickoff returns for a total of 218 yards, an average of 72.7 yards per return. This set an NCAA record for the highest average gain per return in a single game. In his career as a Trojan he returned 37 kickoffs for 1,299 yards, an NCAA record 35.1 yard average. His six career kickoff returns for touchdowns set an NCAA record which stood until 2009, when it was broken by C. J. Spiller of Clemson. Davis' kickoff return average of 42.5 yards in 1974, is the highest kickoff return average for any single season leader ever. He was also the first Pacific-8 Conference player to rush for more than 1,000 yards in three consecutive seasons – 1,191 in 1972; 1,112 in 1973 and 1,469 in 1974. For his career at USC, he carried the ball 784 times for 3,772 yards and 44 touchdowns. Davis was also a repeat (1973, 1974) first-team All-Pac-8 Conference selection. He was also the third multiple recipient of the W.J. Voit Memorial Trophy, awarded each year to the outstanding football player on the Pacific Coast. Davis won the Voit trophy in 1972 and 1974.

On November 30, 1974, he started an amazing rally which brought the Trojans back from a 24–0 second quarter deficit against #4 ranked Notre Dame to a 55–24 win. Just before halftime, he scored on a seven-yard lateral pass from quarterback Pat Haden. Davis found paydirt a second time on a 102-yard kickoff return to open the second half. With only 3:25 elapsed in the third quarter, Davis scored a third touchdown on a six-yard run. Then with still 8:37 left in the same quarter, Davis added his fourth and final touchdown of the game on a four-yard dash, dropped to his knees, went into his "endzone dance", then added a two-point conversion and the Trojans had the lead 27–24. Incredibly, Davis had scored 26 of the Trojans' first 27 points.

In 1974, Heisman Trophy ballots were due prior to the end of the season and before that year's USC-Notre Dame game. He finished second in the voting to Archie Griffin of Ohio State. Afterward, Heisman voting took place after all the regular season games had been played. From 1972 to 1974, with Davis as the tailback the Trojans compiled a 31–3–2 (.889) record, three conference titles, two Rose Bowl victories in three appearances and two national championships. He accumulated 24 school, conference, and NCAA records, including over 5,400 all-purpose yards and 52 touchdowns.

Davis' talents were not just limited to football, he was also successful in baseball as an outfielder and switch-hitter on USC's 1972, 1973, and 1974 College World Series champion baseball teams. Playing with wood bats at the time, Davis hit .273 with six home runs, 45 RBIs and 13 stolen bases for the Trojans' 1974 team.

During his Trojan career, Davis won five national championships – two in football, three in baseball. As a two-sport standout, Davis holds the distinction of being the only player in school history to start for a national champion football team (1972) and a national champion baseball team (1974). He did not finish his degree at USC.

The Notre Dame vs. USC game on November 27, 2004 was titled "Anthony Davis Day", in recognition of the 30th anniversary of the record-breaking game.

While at USC, Davis was on the cover of Sports Illustrated magazine three times, including one foldout. He was inducted into the College Football Hall of Fame in late 2005 in New York City, and enshrined on August 12, 2006, in South Bend, Indiana.

== Professional career ==
The Minnesota Twins selected him in the fourth round of the 1975 January amateur entry draft (83rd overall pick) for Major League Baseball (MLB); however he rejected them, thinking they would be unable to meet his salary demands.

=== World Football League ===
Davis was selected by the New York Jets in the second round of the 1975 NFL draft, 37th overall. At the time, the Jets had veteran quarterback Joe Namath and offered a major stage, but the team's management were not willing to give in to his contract demands. In 1975, Davis opted to play for the Southern California Sun of the upstart World Football League (WFL); he signed a five-year, $1.7-million deal that reportedly included a $200,000 cash bonus and a Rolls-Royce.

He led the WFL in rushing with 1,200 yards on 239 carries and 16 touchdowns at the time of its demise. He also caught 40 passes for 381 yards and one touchdown, while on kickoff returns he ran back 9 for 235 yards and one touchdown. In all, he scored 18 TDs in the WFL for 133 points. His 16 touchdowns for rushing over 12 games is a WFL record. He also threw the ball and completed four of eleven attempts for 102 yards and a touchdown. The league folded during the season in October, and Davis moved on.

=== Canadian Football League ===
Davis headed to the Canadian Football League in 1976, and became the league's first "million dollar man." His time with the Toronto Argonauts was not happy; his star ego clashed with CFL legend and Argos' head coach Russ Jackson's idea of a team player as a receiver. He rushed 104 times for 417 yards, caught 37 passes for 408 yards, and scored four touchdowns; Davis later stated that his heart wasn't in it with playing for the Argonauts.

During the final regular season game against the Hamilton Tiger-Cats (in Hamilton, Ontario), Argonauts quarterback Matthew Reed, desperate to find an open receiver, threw an incomplete pass to Davis. When Reed returned to the bench, assistant coach Joe Moss told him never to throw the ball to Davis again; he had one carry and called himself the most expensive passing decoy in football.

=== National Football League ===
The Tampa Bay Buccaneers had acquired the NFL rights to Davis in the 1976 NFL expansion draft, with his old USC head coach John McKay hoping to turn some new magic, but Davis' NFL career was a disappointment. Tampa Bay had lost all fourteen games in 1976, and injuries to the Bucs' top two quarterbacks in the preseason put extra pressure on the offense. In eleven games for the Bucs in 1977, he rushed 95 times for 297 yards (3.1 yard average), caught eight passes, and scored a touchdown.

In 1978, Davis played two games for the Houston Oilers, where he broke his leg in the same spot twice in one season. He later played two games for the Los Angeles Rams, where he rushed three times for seven yards.

=== United States Football League ===
In the spring of 1983 at age thirty, over four years after he last played with the Rams, Davis had a short stint with the Los Angeles Express of the new USFL, rushing twelve times for 32 yards.

== Personal life ==
Following his football career, Davis found initial success as a real estate developer in the 1980s and early 1990s, while also occasionally acting in minor film and television roles.

In 1990, Davis fulfilled a long-time dream and started playing professional baseball in the short-lived Senior Professional Baseball Association, playing as an outfielder for the San Bernardino Pride club. The Pride had a record of 13–12 and were in third place when the league canceled the season on December 26, less than the halfway point in a planned 56-game schedule.

In 2020, he was featured in the documentary "Quiet Explosions: Healing the Brain" produced and directed by Jerri Sher. The film discusses CTE, a degenerative brain disease from repetitive brain trauma that Davis suffers from.

== See also ==
- List of NCAA major college yearly punt and kickoff return leaders
