= Grand Théâtre de Québec =

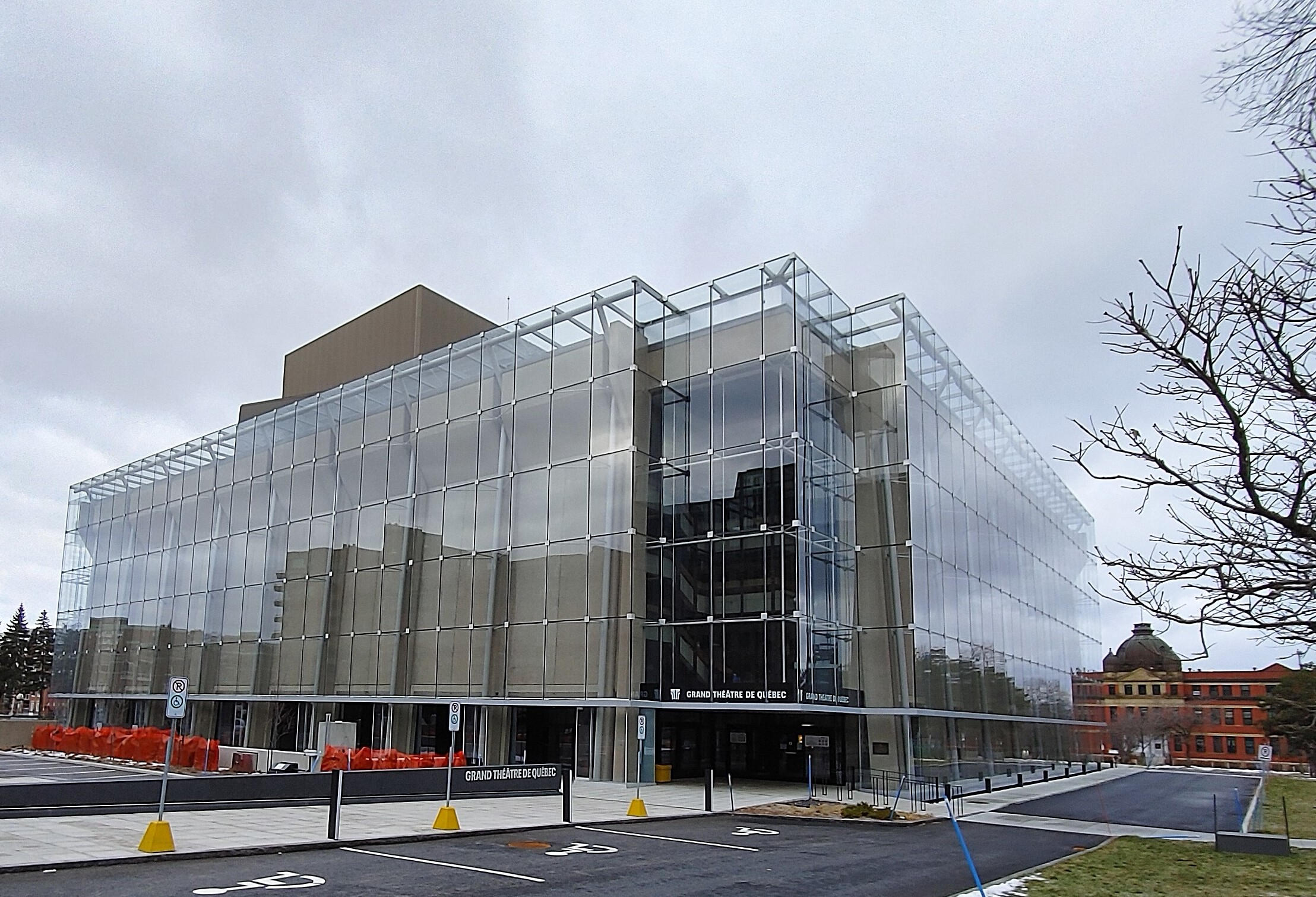
- Grand Théâtre de Québec in 2020
- Interactive map of Grand Théâtre de Québec
- Address: 269, boulevard René-Lévesque Est; Quebec City, Quebec; G1R 2B3
- Coordinates: 46.80635°N 71.22175°W
- Capacity: 2,395

Construction
- Opened: January 16, 1971
- Rebuilt: 2020
- Architect: Victor Prus

Website
- Official site

The Grand Théâtre de Québec (French pronunciation: [ɡʁɑ̃ teɑtʁ də kebɛk]) is a performing arts complex in Quebec City, Quebec, Canada. It was conceived to commemorate the Canadian Centennial of 1967 and the Quebec Conference, 1864, one of the key meetings leading to the Canadian Confederation of 1867.

Designed by Polish-Canadian architect Victor Prus, construction began in 1966 under Premier Jean Lesage but was stopped by the Union Nationale government of Daniel Johnson. Construction resumed in late 1967 but the theatre was not officially opened until January 16, 1971.

In 1969, Jordi Bonet, a Catalan artist resident in Quebec, was commissioned to decorate the theatre's lobby with a mural. The relief he created provoked a scandal at its unveiling in 1971, since it incorporated the line "Vous êtes pas écœurés de mourir bande de caves? C'est assez !" ("Aren't you sick of dying, you gang of idiots? Enough!"), a quotation from the poet Claude Péloquin.

The theatre has two venues:

- Salle Louis Fréchette, with 1,885 seats, is named after the 19th-century French-Canadian writer Louis-Honoré Fréchette.
- Salle Octave Crémazie, with 510 seats, is named after the 19th-century Canadian poet, Octave Crémazie, who was known as "the father of French-Canadian poetry".

Since October 1972, the Conservatoire de musique du Québec à Québec has been located in the Grand Théâtre's complex. In 1991, the theatre complex housed 49 classrooms, 70 teaching and practice studios, and a multi-media centre with a recording studio and electroacoustic lab. The complex is also home to a library which in 1991 included more than 60,000 documents of books, scores, monographs, periodicals, and recordings in various media formats.

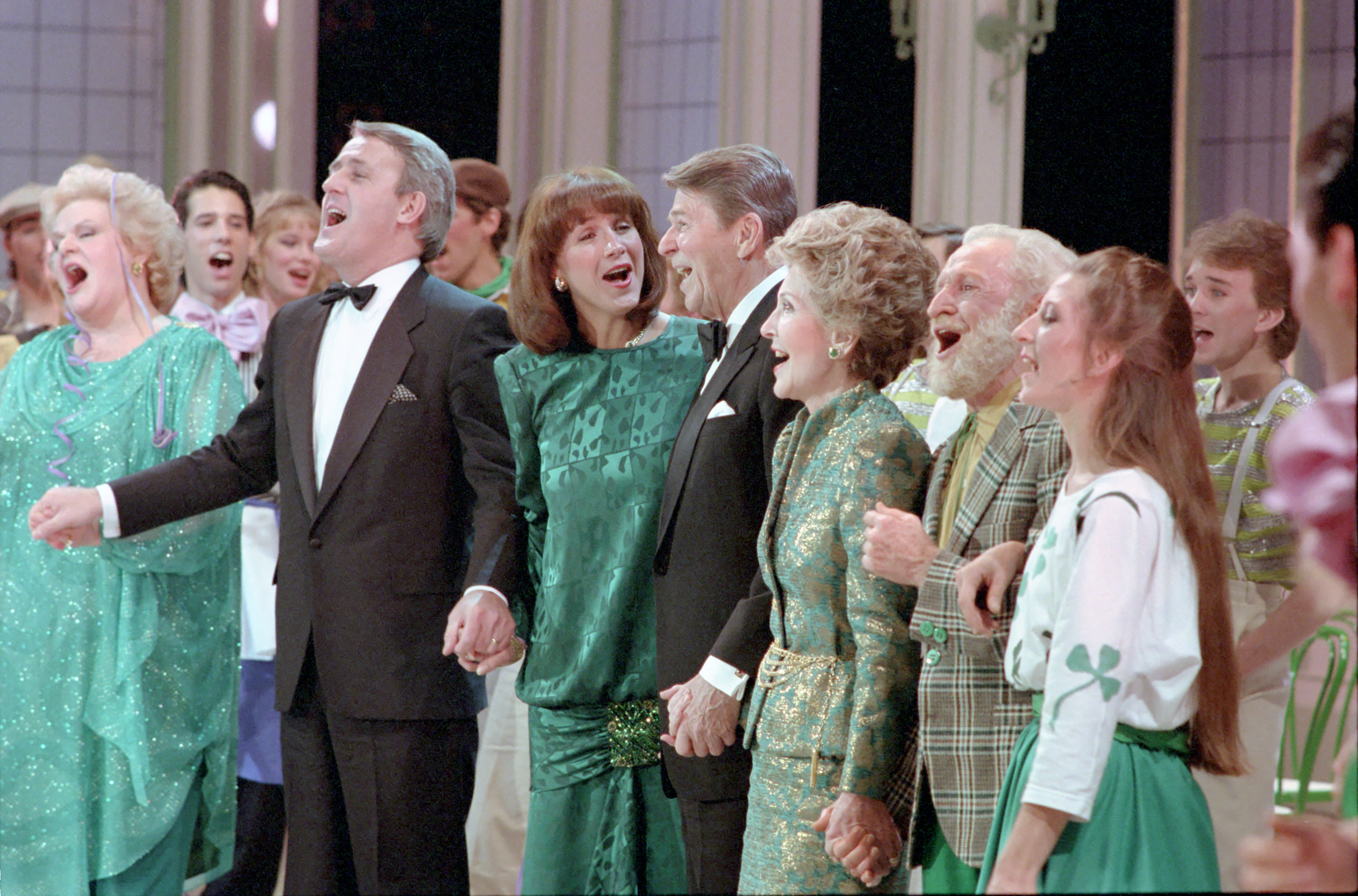
The Mulroneys and Reagans singing "When Irish Eyes Are Smiling" at the Grand Théâtre de Québec on the last day of the Shamrock Summit on March 18, 1985

The theatre was used for the 1985 Shamrock Summit when Canadian Prime Minister Brian Mulroney entertained U.S. President Ronald Reagan.

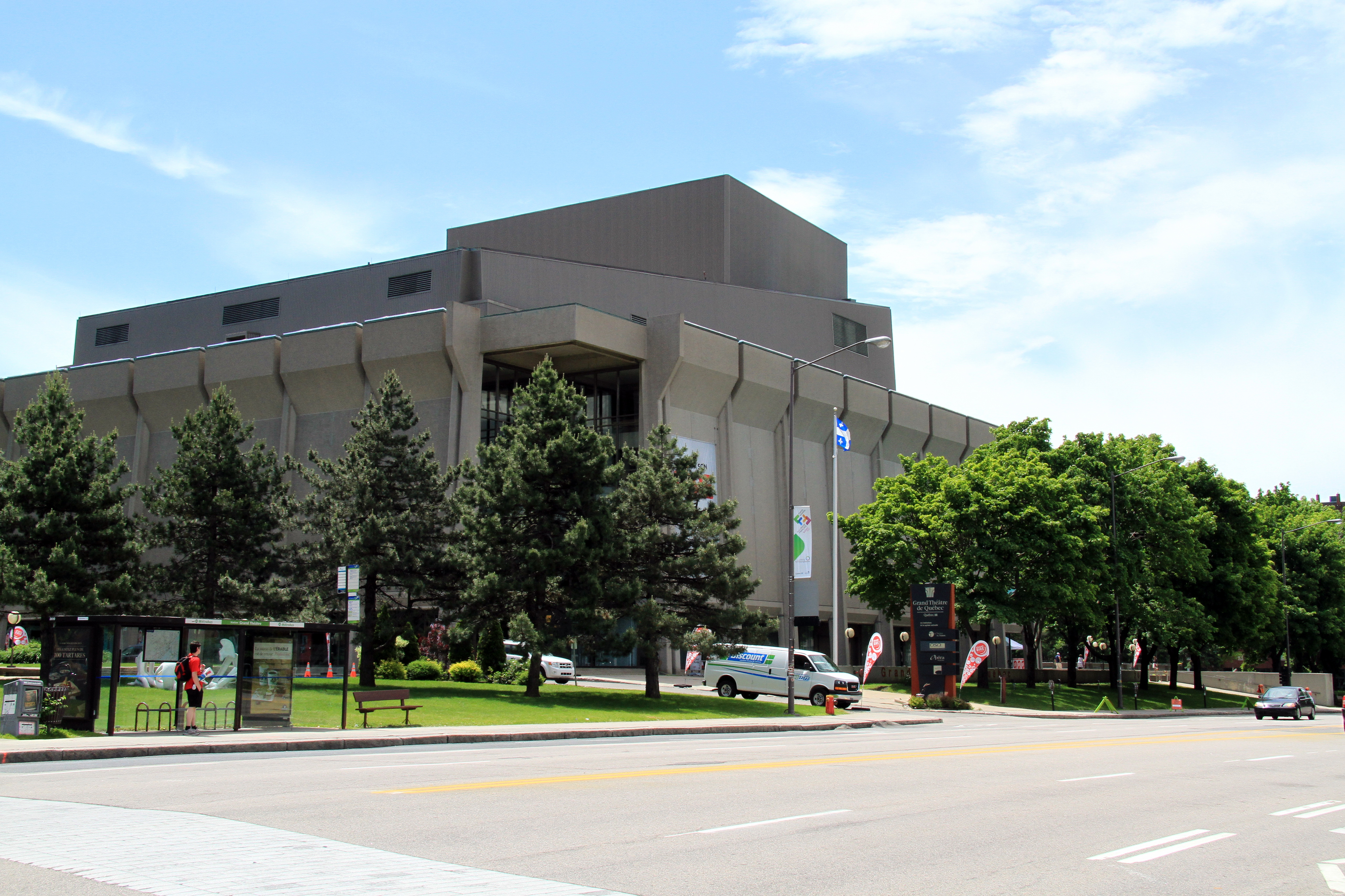
Grand Théâtre de Québec in 2012, before it was covered with a glass envelope in 2020

In 2020, the Grand Théâtre de Québec was restored and covered with a glass envelope supported by a steel frame, designed by Lemay and Atelier 21, to preserve the structure's architecture and a sculptural mural from artist Jordi Bonet embedded into the façade. Protected from temperature and humidity fluctuations, the approach was considered a first in North America at the time of its implementation.

Organizations which use the theatre include the Orchestre symphonique de Québec, the Théâtre du Trident, and the Opéra de Québec. The Festival d'été de Québec often hosts events in the theatre.

In 2021 Grand Théâtre de Québec received the Canadian RAIC: Royal Architectural Institute of Canada "Innovation in Architecture Award" in part for "a host of notable innovations in the spirit of honouring the original Victor Prus building".
