= Paul Gilson (Canadian football) =

Canadian football player and wrestler

Personal information
- Nationality: Canadian
- Years active: 1970s–1980s
- Height: 6 ft 3 in (1.91 m)
- Weight: 247 lb (112 kg)

Sport
- Sport: Wrestling
- Position: Defensive tackle
- Team: Toronto Argonauts

Paul Gilson is a Canadian former wrestler and football player who competed for the University of Guelph. He was a two-time CIAU national silver medallist in heavyweight wrestling, was named the university's Athlete of the Year for 1974–75, and was selected by the Toronto Argonauts as a territorial exemption in the 1975 CFL Draft.

== Wrestling career ==
Gilson competed for the University of Guelph wrestling team during the 1970s and was one of the university's leading student-athletes.

During the 1974–75 season, Gilson won the Ontario University Athletics Association (OUAA) wrestling championship.

Newspaper coverage of the 1975 OUAA Wrestling Championships identified Gilson as the heavyweight champion and reported that Guelph captured four individual titles.

The following season, Gilson helped the University of Guelph capture the OUAA wrestling team championship. The Waterloo Region Record reported that Guelph dethroned defending champion Western Ontario and that Gilson was among six Guelph wrestlers who won individual weight classes.

University of Guelph athletics records list Gilson among the institution's OUA individual wrestling champions for the 1975–76 season.

Gilson was a two-time CIAU national silver medallist in heavyweight wrestling, earning national silver medals in 1975 and 1976. Coverage of the 1975 CIAU Wrestling Championships reported that he was defeated 9–3 by University of British Columbia heavyweight champion Kyle Raymond.

In 1975, Gilson was named the University of Guelph's Athlete of the Year in recognition of his accomplishments in wrestling and football.

Following his university career, Gilson continued to compete in amateur wrestling. In 1983 he won the 90-kilogram division at the Ontario Greco-Roman Wrestling Championships while competing for Ryerson.

== Football career ==
Gilson played football for the University of Guelph Gryphons as a defensive tackle. Standing 6 ft 3 in (1.91 m) and weighing approximately 247 pounds, he played on the Gryphons defensive line.

Prior to the 1975 CFL Draft, the Toronto Argonauts designated Gilson as a territorial exemption selection. Draft coverage in the Toronto Sun listed Gilson as a defensive tackle from the University of Guelph and one of Toronto's protected local prospects.

In 1975, The Globe and Mail reported that the Argonauts expected to sign Gilson and quoted general manager John Barrow as describing him as "today's top prospect".

Gilson signed with the Argonauts before the 1975 season. A feature article in the Willowdale Mirror reported that Argonaut coaches converted him from defensive tackle to offensive guard and highlighted his wrestling background and athletic development.

He participated in Toronto's 1975 training camp and appeared in intra-squad practices and exhibition preparations.

Gilson remained with the club through training camp before being released during final roster reductions in June 1975.

== Personal life ==
In 1975, an aneurysm was discovered during a medical examination at Toronto Argonauts training camp. Gilson subsequently underwent surgery at St. Joseph's Hospital in Guelph. A feature article in the Kitchener-Waterloo Record reported that physicians believed the condition could have been life-threatening had it not been detected during the football medical examination.

== Awards and honours ==
- University of Guelph Athlete of the Year (1974–75)
- CIAU national silver medallist, heavyweight wrestling (1975)
- CIAU national silver medallist, heavyweight wrestling (1976)
- OUAA Wrestling Champion (1974–75)
- OUA Individual Wrestling Champion (1975–76)
- Ontario Greco-Roman Wrestling Champion, 90 kg (1983)
- Toronto Argonauts territorial exemption selection in the 1975 CFL Draft.
