= 1976 Hamilton Tiger-Cats season =

Season of Canadian Football League team the Hamilton Tiger-Cats

- Head coach: George Dickson (0-2); Bob Shaw (8-6)
- Home stadium: Ivor Wynne Stadium

Results
- Record: 8–8
- Division place: 2nd, East
- Playoffs: Lost Eastern Final
- Team MOP: Jimmy Edwards
- Team MOC: Ken Clark
- Team MOR: Alan Moffat

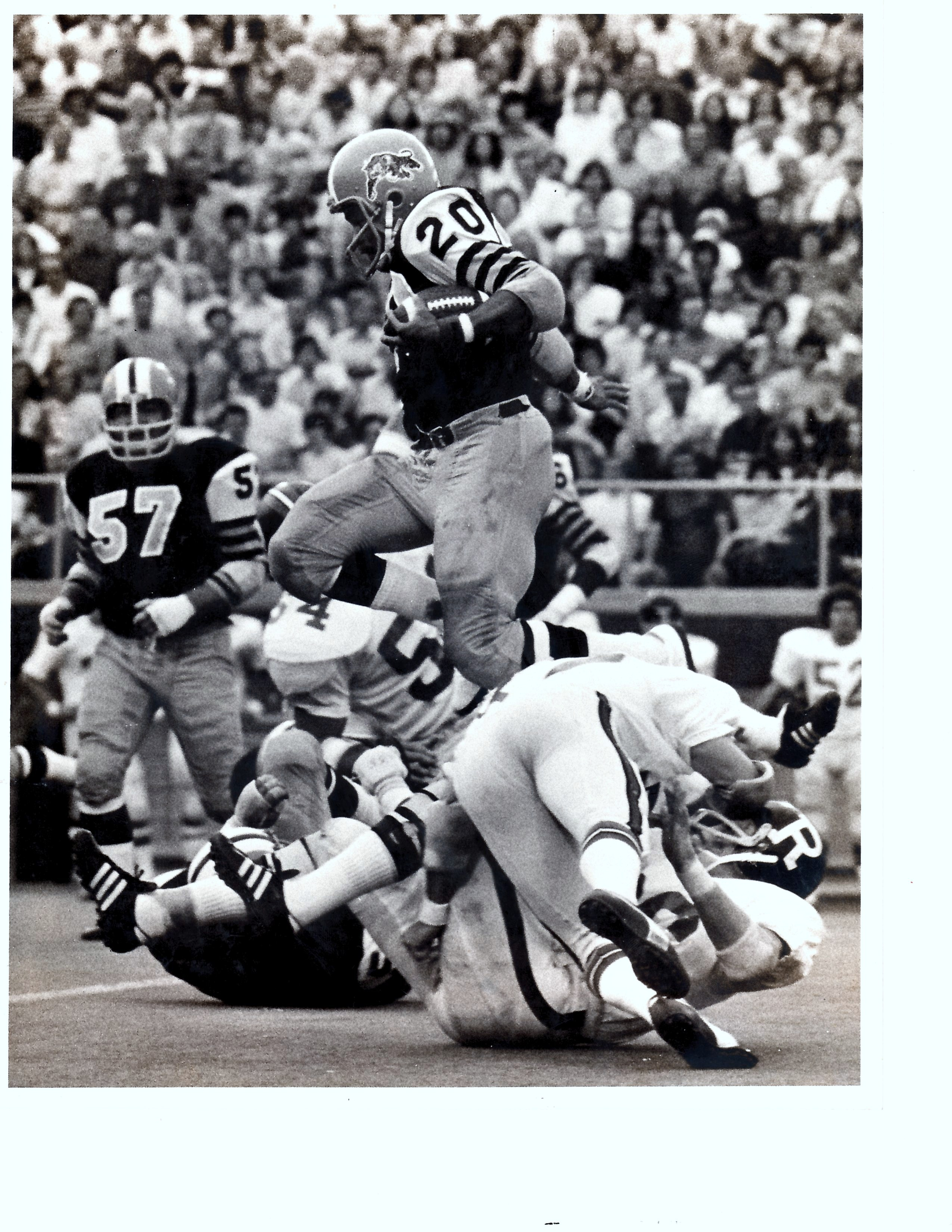
View of Canadian Football League, 1976

The 1976 Hamilton Tiger-Cats season was the 19th season for the team in the Canadian Football League (CFL) and their 27th overall. The Tiger-Cats finished in second place in the Eastern Conference with an 8–8 record but lost the Eastern Final to the Ottawa Rough Riders.

== Regular season ==
=== Season standings ===
Eastern Football Conference
Team	GP	W	L	T	PF	PA	Pts
Ottawa Rough Riders	16	9	6	1	411	346	19
Hamilton Tiger-Cats	16	8	8	0	269	348	16
Montreal Alouettes	16	7	8	1	305	273	15
Toronto Argonauts	16	7	8	1	289	354	15

=== Season schedule ===
Week	Game	Date	Opponent	Results		Venue	Attendance
Week	Game	Date	Opponent	Score	Record	Venue	Attendance
1	1	July 21	vs. Ottawa Rough Riders	L 16–42	0–1	Ivor Wynne Stadium	
2	2	July 29	at BC Lions	L 14–39	0–2	Empire Stadium	
3	3	Aug 7	vs. Saskatchewan Roughriders	L 8–24	0–3	Ivor Wynne Stadium	
4	4	Aug 12	at Montreal Alouettes	W 12–11	1–3	Autostade	
5	5	Aug 18	at Toronto Argonauts	L 11–14	1–4	Exhibition Stadium	
6	6	Aug 25	vs. Calgary Stampeders	W 18–11	2–4	Ivor Wynne Stadium	
7	7	Aug 31	at Edmonton Eskimos	L 1–5	2–5	Clarke Stadium	
7	8	Sept 6	vs. Winnipeg Blue Bombers	W 17–15	3–5	Ivor Wynne Stadium	
8	9	Sept 12	at Toronto Argonauts	L 22–31	3–6	Exhibition Stadium	
9	10	Sept 19	at Ottawa Rough Riders	W 28–21	4–6	Lansdowne Park	
10	11	Sept 25	vs. Toronto Argonauts	W 29–14	5–6	Ivor Wynne Stadium	
11	12	Oct 3	at Montreal Alouettes	W 26–19	6–6	Autostade	
12	13	Oct 11	vs. Montreal Alouettes	L 9–34	6–7	Ivor Wynne Stadium	
14	14	Oct 24	vs. Ottawa Rough Riders	L 10–48	6–8	Ivor Wynne Stadium	
15	15	Oct 31	at Ottawa Rough Riders	W 25–6	7–8	Lansdowne Park	
16	16	Nov 7	vs. Toronto Argonauts	W 23–14	8–8	Ivor Wynne Stadium	

== Post-season ==
Round	Date	Opponent	Results		Venue	Attendance
Round	Date	Opponent	Score	Record	Venue	Attendance
Eastern Semi-Final	Nov 13	vs. Montreal Alouettes	W 23–0	1–0	Ivor Wynne Stadium	
Eastern Final	Nov 21	at Ottawa Rough Riders	L 15–17	1–1	Lansdowne Park	

=== Awards and honours ===
- CFL's Coach of the Year – Bob Shaw
- John Barrow was elected as a Player into the Canadian Football Hall of Fame August 5, 1976.

==== CFL All-Stars ====
- Jimmy Edwards, Running Back
- Lewis Porter, Defensive Back
- David Shaw, Defensive Back

== Roster ==
1976 Hamilton Tiger-Cats final roster
Quarterbacks: 10 Jimmy Jones; 7 Randy Mattingly; 11 Tom Shuman; Running backs: 20 Jimmy Edwards; 36 Bill Harrison; 22 Jimmie Lee Jones; 23 Angelo Santucci; 32 Paul Whaley; Wide receivers: 13 Ken Clark K/P; 25 Terry Evanshen; 7 M. L. Harris; 22 Len Platt; 28 Slade Willis	Tight ends: 74 Walt Bauer; 77 Lawrie Skolrood; Offensive linemen: 63 Nick Bastaja G; 68 Larry Butler G; 58 Ed Chalupka G; 54 Bart Evans G; 56 Alan Moffat T/DT; 50 Henry Waszczuk C; 67 Mike Wilson T; Defensive linemen: 65 David Boone; 61 Ian MacPherson; 62 Mike Samples	Linebackers: 47 Sam Britts; 41 Kent Carter; 34 Gail Clark; 45 Joe Harris; 42 Rob McLaren; 31 Ed Siuciak; Defensive backs: 30 Larry Brune; 12 Lewis Cook; 33 Steve Gelley; 32 Doug Kitts; 18 Dave Montagano; 24 Lewis Porter; 37 David Shaw; Italics indicate American players
