= 1975 CFL draft =

Canadian football draft

The 1975 CFL draft composed of eight rounds where 81 Canadian football players were chosen from eligible Canadian universities and Canadian players playing in the NCAA. A total of 16 players were selected as territorial exemptions, with the Montreal Alouettes being the only team to make no picks during this stage of the draft. Through a trade with the Calgary Stampeders, the Winnipeg Blue Bombers selected first overall in the draft. They would not choose first overall again until the 2011 CFL draft.

== Territorial exemptions ==
Calgary Stampeders Doug Carlson DB Colorado

Calgary Stampeders Lloyd Fairbanks G Brigham Young

Toronto Argonauts Paul Gilson DT Guelph

Toronto Argonauts Neil Mairs TB Otterbein

Winnipeg Blue Bombers Mel Barclay DE Manitoba

Winnipeg Blue Bombers Doug MacIver DT Manitoba

British Columbia Lions Barry Houlihan TB Simon Fraser

British Columbia Lions Mark McDonald WR Washington State

Hamilton Tiger-Cats Nick Bastaja G Simon Fraser

Hamilton Tiger-Cats Angelo Santucci TB Saint Mary's

Saskatchewan Roughriders Ron Moen LB Saskatchewan

Saskatchewan Roughriders Larry Remmen TB Saskatchewan

Ottawa Rough Riders Peter Stenerson QB Carleton

Ottawa Rough Riders Jeff Turcotte DT Colorado

Edmonton Eskimos Pete Lavorato DB Utah State

Edmonton Eskimos Tom Towns LB Alberta

== 1st round ==
1. Winnipeg Blue Bombers Steve Scully T Syracuse

2. Toronto Argonauts Allan Charuk WR Acadia

3. Hamilton Tiger-Cats Gerald Kunyk QB Alberta

4. Winnipeg Blue Bombers Don Bowman DB Western Ontario

5. Hamilton Tiger-Cats Sean Sullivan TB Simon Fraser

6. Hamilton Tiger-Cats Krys Kasprzyk DT Wooster

7. Ottawa Rough Riders Marvin Allemang LB Acadia

8. Winnipeg Blue Bombers Bernard Ruoff K Syracuse

9. Montreal Alouettes Bill Simmons DB New Brunswick

== 2nd round ==
10. Calgary Stampeders Maurice Charbonneau T McMaster

11. Edmonton Eskimos John Martin DE Carleton

12. Saskatchewan Roughriders Phil Monckton TE Western Ontario

13. Ottawa Rough Riders Dave Patterson LB Simon Fraser

14. Calgary Stampeders Greg Warkentin E Simon Fraser

15. Saskatchewan Roughriders Wade Clare TB Loyola

16. Ottawa Rough Riders Jim Baker C Alberta

17. Edmonton Eskimos Bob Gillies G Bishop's

18. Saskatchewan Roughriders Bill Evans LB Alberta

== 3rd round ==
19. Calgary Stampeders Rick Finseth QB Pacific Lutheran

20. British Columbia Lions Mike Harrington DB Saskatchewan

21. Winnipeg Blue Bombers Mike Munzar QB Bishop's

22. Saskatchewan Roughriders Alex Morris DB Queen's

23. British Columbia Lions Peter Walker T Wilfrid Laurier

24. Saskatchewan Roughriders Bob Woloschuk TB McMaster

25. Ottawa Rough Riders Cliff Summers LB Western Ontario

26. Edmonton Eskimos Curt Rush WR Western Ontario

27. Winnipeg Blue Bombers Alex Morris DB Queen's

== 4th round ==
28. Calgary Stampeders Rick Fenseth QB Pacific Lutheran

29. Toronto Argonauts Doug Brandt DB Winona State

30. Winnipeg Blue Bombers Kevin Spink C Western Ontario

31. British Columbia Lions Randy Ragon K U.S. International

32. Hamilton Tiger-Cats Libert Castillo TB Toronto

33. Saskatchewan Roughriders Carl Thoma G Saskatchewan

34. Ottawa Rough Riders Grant Stephenson LB Saint Mary's

35. Edmonton Eskimos John Latter T Bishop's

== 5th round ==
36. Calgary Stampeders Richard Pederson T Wilfrid Laurier

37. Toronto Argonauts Don Cornwell LB Guelph

38. Winnipeg Blue Bombers Dave Pearson DB Manitoba

39. British Columbia Lions Warren Howe WR Western Ontario

40. Hamilton Tiger-Cats Brian Pienderleith WR Windsor

41. Saskatchewan Roughriders Brent Schwartz LB Manitoba

42. Ottawa Rough Riders Scott Gibson G Manitoba

43. Edmonton Eskimos Barrie Fraser QB Saskatchewan

== 6th round ==
44. Calgary Stampeders Rick Krahn LB Delta State

45. Toronto Argonauts Ed Dietrich DE Wilfrid Laurier

46. Winnipeg Blue Bombers Wayne Wagner FB Manitoba

47. British Columbia Lions Paul Barchiesi DT Western Ontario

48. Hamilton Tiger-Cats Ian Anderson LB Queen's

49. Saskatchewan Roughriders Alan Cameron T Colorado

50. Ottawa Rough Riders Arunas Pleckaitis TE Carleton

51. Edmonton Eskimos Warren Kiland T Hawaii

52. Edmonton Eskimos Ken Luchkow DE Alberta

== 7th round ==
53. Calgary Stampeders Doug Senik DE Alberta

54. Winnipeg Blue Bombers Dave Pearson DB Manitoba

55. British Columbia Lions Don McLellan LB Simon Fraser

56. Hamilton Tiger-Cats Warren Howe WR Western Ontario

57. Saskatchewan Roughriders Marv Messner DE North Dakota

58. Ottawa Rough Riders Roy Biljetina TE Wooster

59. Edmonton Eskimos Marty Doyle T Carleton

60. Edmonton Eskimos Greg Anderson TE Queen's

== 8th round ==
61. Calgary Stampeders Art Niederbuhl DB Loyola

62. Winnipeg Blue Bombers Peter Sabiston G Queen's

63. British Columbia Lions Doug Murray T Bishop's

64. Hamilton Tiger-Cats Bob Heartwell HB Western Ontario

65. Hamilton Tiger-Cats Richard Chalupka TB Wilfrid Laurier
