= 1975 Hamilton Tiger-Cats season =

Season of Canadian Football League team the Hamilton Tiger-Cats

- Head coach: Jerry Williams
- Home stadium: Ivor Wynne Stadium

Results
- Record: 5–10–1
- Division place: 3rd, East
- Playoffs: Lost Eastern Semi-Final
- Team MOP: Garney Henley
- Team MOC: Terry Evanshen
- Team MOR: Angelo Santucci

The 1975 Hamilton Tiger-Cats season was the 18th season for the team in the Canadian Football League (CFL) and their 26th overall. The Tiger-Cats finished in third place in the Eastern Conference with a 5–10–1 record, but lost the Eastern Semi-Final to the Montreal Alouettes.

Tiger-Cats president Ralph Sazio became president of the Canadian Football League in 1975. It would be Garney Henley's last season with the Tiger-Cats where he finished his career with 56 touchdowns. At the time, it was the franchise record for most touchdowns in a Tiger-Cats career. Long-time CFL star Jerry Keeling would join the Tiger-Cats midway through the season, as it would also be his final season in the CFL.

Terry Evanshen set a Tiger-Cats record (since broken) for most touchdowns in one season by a Tiger-Cats player with 13. On September 7, Evanshen scored four of those touchdowns in one game against the Ottawa Rough Riders. He tied Garney Henley's record for most touchdowns in one game by a Tiger-Cats player. In the same game, Evanshen would set a franchise record with most points in one game by scoring 26 points.

Tragedy struck the CFL in October, when 23-year-old, Hamilton Tiger-Cats star Tom Pate suffered an aneurysm in the fourth quarter against the Stampeders at McMahon Stadium. Pate was never again conscious and would die two days later. A year later, the CFLPA announced the Tom Pate Memorial Award in his honour to be awarded to the player who best personifies a unique combination of outstanding sportsmanship and dedication to the league and the community.

== Roster ==
1975 Hamilton Tiger-Cats final roster
Quarterbacks: 10 Jerry Keeling; 12 Jim McMillan; Running backs: 20 Andy Hopkins; 23 Angelo Santucci; 16 Les Strayhorn; 22 Mike Walker; 11 Terry Wellesley; Wide receivers: 13 Ken Clark P; 25 Terry Evanshen; 26 Garney Henley DB; 70 Speedy Thomas; Tight ends: 77 Lawrie Skolrood	Offensive linemen: 63 Nick Bastaja T/G; 58 Ed Chalupka G; 55 Bill Danychuk T; 59 Ted Hand C/T; 68 Marion Latimore G; 50 Henry Waszczuk C; Defensive linemen: 61 Ezil Bibbs; 78 Mark Chalmers; 66 David Douglas; 67 Ron Forwick; 62 Mike Samples	Linebackers: 52 Ken Ferguson; 76 Richard Griffiths; 45 Joe Harris; 14 Bob Krouse; Defensive backs: 31 Lou Clare; 19 Dave Easley; 3 John Kruspe; 24 Lewis Porter; 17 Ernie Palango; 37 David Shaw; Special teams: 36 Ian Sunter K; Italics indicate American players

== Regular season ==
=== Season standings ===
Eastern Football Conference
Team	GP	W	L	T	PF	PA	Pts
Ottawa Rough Riders	16	10	5	1	394	280	21
Montreal Alouettes	16	9	7	0	353	345	18
Hamilton Tiger-Cats	16	5	10	1	284	395	11
Toronto Argonauts	16	5	10	1	261	324	11

=== Season schedule ===
Week	Game	Date	Opponent	Result	Record	Venue	Attendance
1	1	July 23	vs. Montreal Alouettes	L 23–33	0–1		
2	2	July 30	vs. Ottawa Rough Riders	L 9–31	0–2		
3	3	Aug 5	at Montreal Alouettes	W 15–8	1–2		
4	4	Aug 13	at Toronto Argonauts	L 7–27	1–3		
5	5	Aug 19	vs. Montreal Alouettes	L 13–35	1–4		
6	Bye						
7	6	Sept 1	vs. Toronto Argonauts	W 20–11	2–4		
8	7	Sept 7	at Ottawa Rough Riders	L 31–56	2–5		
9	8	Sept 14	vs. Edmonton Eskimos	L 3–17	2–6		
10	9	Sept 21	at Saskatchewan Roughriders	T 28–28	2–6–1		
11	10	Sept 24	at Winnipeg Blue Bombers	L 32–34	2–7–1		
12	11	Oct 1	vs. Ottawa Rough Riders	L 11–16	2–8–1		
13	12	Oct 8	at Ottawa Rough Riders	L 4–31	2–9–1		
13	13	Oct 12	vs. BC Lions	W 14–8	3–9–1		
14	14	Oct 18	at Calgary Stampeders	W 25–23	4–9–1		
15	15	Oct 25	at Toronto Argonauts	L 23–27	4–10–1		
16	16	Nov 1	vs. Toronto Argonauts	W 26–10	5–10–1		

== Post-season ==
Round	Date	Opponent	Result	Record	Venue	Attendance
Eastern Semi-Final	Nov 9	Montreal Alouettes	L 12–35	0–1		

=== Awards and honours ===
==== CFL All-Stars ====
- None
