= Richard Pederson =

American politician (born 1928)

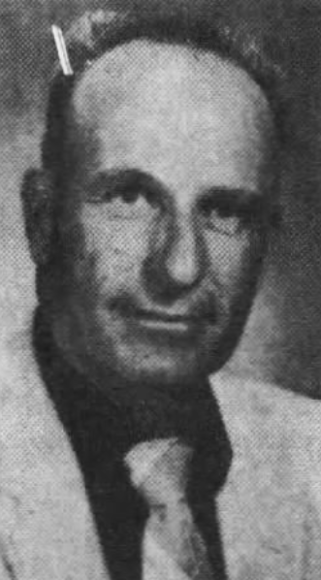
- Pederson in 1985

Member of the North Dakota House of Representatives
- In office 1985–1986

Personal details
- Born: December 13, 1928 (age 97)
- Party: Republican

Richard Charles Pederson Jr. (born December 13, 1928) is an American politician. He served as a Republican member of the North Dakota House of Representatives.

== Life and career ==
Pederson was a farmer and rancher.

Pederson served in the North Dakota House of Representatives from 1985 to 1986.
