= Ward Smith =

Canadian gridiron football player (1947–2007)

Profile
- Position: Running back

Personal information
- Born: May 3, 1947; Calgary, Alberta, Canada
- Died: August 29, 2007 (aged 60); Toronto, Ontario, Canada
- Listed height: 5 ft 10 in (1.78 m)
- Listed weight: 185 lb (84 kg)

Career information
- College: Boise State

Career history
- 1969: Calgary Stampeders
- 1969, 1970: BC Lions
- 1970: Winnipeg Blue Bombers
- 1973–1975: Montreal Alouettes
- 1977: Toronto Argonauts

Awards and highlights
- Grey Cup champion (1974)

Daryl Ward Smith (May 3, 1947 – August 29, 2007) was a Canadian professional football player who played for the Calgary Stampeders, BC Lions, Winnipeg Blue Bombers, Montreal Alouettes and Toronto Argonauts of the Canadian Football League (CFL). He played college football at Boise State University.
