= Don Layton =

American gridiron football player (1951–2006)

Donnie Layton
Profile
- Position: Running back

Personal information
- Born: September 18, 1951; Spartanburg, South Carolina, U.S.
- Died: June 28, 2006 (aged 54); Spartanburg, South Carolina, U.S.
- Listed height: 6 ft 0 in (1.83 m)
- Listed weight: 200 lb (91 kg)

Career information
- College: South Carolina State
- NFL draft: 1975: 10th round, 243rd overall pick

Career history
- 1975: Edmonton Eskimos

Awards and highlights
- Grey Cup champion (1975)

Donnie O'Neal Layton (September 18, 1951 – June 28, 2006) was an American professional Canadian football player who played for the Edmonton Eskimos of the Canadian Football League (CFL). He won the Grey Cup with Edmonton in 1975. He played college football at South Carolina State University.

Layton was selected by the San Francisco 49ers in the 10th round of the 1975 NFL draft but did not play in the league.
