= Johnny Forzani =

Canadian football player (born 1988)

No. 80
- Position: Wide receiver

Personal information
- Born: November 3, 1988 (age 38); Calgary, Alberta, Canada
- Listed height: 6 ft 1 in (1.85 m)
- Listed weight: 202 lb (92 kg)

Career information
- College: Washington State
- CFL draft: 2010: Supplemental 3rd round

Career history
- 2010–2012: Calgary Stampeders

Johnny Forzani (born November 3, 1988) is a former professional football player for the Calgary Stampeders in the CFL.

== Football career ==
Forzani played college football at Washington State University, where he tied an NCAA record for the longest touchdown reception, 99 yards against Arizona State in 2009.

Forzani was selected by the Calgary Stampeders in the 2010 CFL supplemental draft. He had previously played for their junior team, the Calgary Colts, in 2007, where he was named rookie of the year and most outstanding receiver after leading the league in yardage per catch. He was also on the Stampeders' practice squad in 2007.

Forzani's father, Tom, played for the Stampeders for 11 years.
