= Barry Randall =

Canadian gridiron football player (born 1943)

Profile
- Position: Offensive tackle

Personal information
- Born: March 25, 1943 (age 83); London, Ontario, Canada
- Listed height: 6 ft 3 in (1.91 m)
- Listed weight: 245 lb (111 kg)

Career information
- College: Eastern Washington

Career history
- 1967–1977: Montreal Alouettes (CFL)

Awards and highlights
- 3× Grey Cup champion (1970, 1974, 1977)

Barry Randall (born March 25, 1943) is a Canadian former professional football offensive lineman who played eleven seasons for the Montreal Alouettes of the Canadian Football League (CFL), winning three Grey Cups.
