= Don Muse =

Canadian football player (born 1952)

Profile
- Position: Tight end

Personal information
- Born: July 16, 1952 (age 74); St. Louis, Missouri, U.S.
- Listed height: 6 ft 2 in (1.88 m)
- Listed weight: 225 lb (102 kg)

Career information
- College: Missouri

Career history
- 1975: Edmonton Eskimos

Awards and highlights
- Grey Cup champion (1975)

Don Muse (born July 16, 1952) is a retired Canadian football player who played for the Edmonton Eskimos. He played college football at the University of Missouri.
