= Maurice Desnoyers =

French-Canadian architect (1927–2022)

Maurice Desnoyers (1927 – 12 December 2022) was a French-Canadian architect and winner of the OAQ Medal of Merit and the Massey Medal. His projects include the Autostade, Musée de la civilization de Québec, and portions of the Montreal Museum of Fine Arts, among many others.

== Early life ==
Desnoyers was born in 1927 in Saint-Hyacinthe, Quebec, sixth in a family of 11 children. His father was a baker. He attended McGill University and studied engineering and architecture, graduating in 1954.

== Architecture career ==
In the 1950s he began his architecture career in Europe and worked as an associate on the UNESCO building in Paris.

In 1957, he and André J. Mercure formed the firm Desnoyers Mercure & Associés. They renovated the Prince-Arthur Gardens in 1973, for which they earned the Massey Medal in 1975. Other projects included converting the warehouses of Religious Hospitallers of Saint Joseph into condominiums, the former Shawinigan aluminum smelter into a contemporary art center, and a restoration of the Library of Parliament in Ottawa.

In the 1970s, he designed the unique mining town of Fermont, Quebec on behalf of Québec Cartier Mining Company. A single building ("Le Mur" or "The Wall") holds a majority of the town's life and serves as a massive windbreak for the rest of the town, which is battered by winter winds during the long Canadian season.

Desnoyers frequently worked with Moshe Safdie, another noted Canadian architect.

== Later life and death ==
Desnoyers retired in 2010. He died on 12 December 2022, at the age of 95.
