= Ian Bryans =

Canadian football player

Profile
- Position: Linebacker

Personal information
- Born: February 3, 1953; Ontario, Canada
- Died: August 1, 2015 (aged 62); Toronto, Ontario, Canada
- Listed height: 6 ft 2 in (1.88 m)
- Listed weight: 219 lb (99 kg)

Career history
- 1975: Toronto Argonauts
- 1976: Hamilton Tiger-Cats
- 1976–1979: Edmonton Eskimos

Awards and highlights
- 2× Grey Cup champion (1978, 1979)

Ian James Bryans (February 3, 1953 – August 1, 2015) was a Canadian professional football player who played for the Toronto Argonauts, Hamilton Tiger-Cats and Edmonton Eskimos. He previously played football at the University of Western Ontario.
