= Doug MacIver =

No. 64
- Position: Defensive tackle

Personal information
- Born: February 20, 1953; Winnipeg, Manitoba, Canada
- Died: January 26, 2012 (aged 58); Winnipeg, Manitoba, Canada

Career information
- University: University of Manitoba
- CFL draft: 1975

Career history
- 1976–1978: Toronto Argonauts
- 1979–1981: Saskatchewan Roughriders
- 1982–1984: Winnipeg Blue Bombers

Awards and highlights
- Grey Cup champion (1984)

Doug MacIver (February 20, 1953 - January 26, 2012) was a former professional Canadian football player and successful car dealer, known for his tenacity on the football field and innovative spirit in the showroom.

== Early life and career ==
Born and raised in Winnipeg, Manitoba, MacIver was the youngest son of long-time Winnipeg Chrysler dealer Jack MacIver, MacIver grew up playing football eventually playing for the University of Manitoba Bisons He was a Territorial Exemption by The Winnipeg Blue Bombers in 1975, started his CFL career with Toronto in 1976, and then signed with the Roughriders in 1979. In the spring of 1982, the Roughriders traded MacIver to Winnipeg for running back Jimmy Edwards. He spent three years in Winnipeg, including their 1984 Grey Cup-winning season. MacIver's career in the CFL lasted nine years in total, and he was a crucial part of the Blue Bombers' Grey Cup team in 1984.

Throughout his CFL career, MacIver played as a nose guard, a position that involves lining up in the middle of the defensive line and engaging in continuous helmet-to-helmet contact. He had been knocked unconscious three times and had experienced other instances of head trauma, including a concussion during his college football years that required hospitalization.

== Career in auto industry ==
Growing up in the auto industry, MacIver would work at various dealers selling cars during the offseason. This would include his Uncle Bruce MacIver's Parkside Ford and his fathers Midway Chrysler. Upon retirement from football, he began working full time for his father before earning the opportunity to run his own Chrysler dealership in Toronto. During the 1990s, his Willowdale Dodge dealership whose slogan was "Just a Pinch Above Finch" became the #1 by volume Chrysler dealership in Canada. Over the years MacIver was known for his marketing prowess, this included a marketing partnership with Jesse and Gene. In 1997 MacIver acquired York Volkswagen. By 2003 MacIver had sold both of his stores Willowdale Dodge (now North York Chrysler) and York Volkswagen (now Yorkdale Volkswagen).

== Personal life and legacy ==
MacIver is survived by his wife, Evelyn, and sons, Andrew and Doug Jr., and daughter Alex, who continue to run the family business. Known for his love of selling cars and his fun approach to the job, MacIver was remembered by those who knew him for his endearing personality and his passion for the auto industry.

== Health and posthumous impact ==
MacIver died at the age of 58 in 2012, and post-mortem studies revealed that he had been suffering from "moderately advanced" chronic traumatic encephalopathy (CTE), a degenerative brain disease associated with repeated head trauma. This diagnosis was made by officials from Boston University's Center for the Study of Traumatic Encephalopathy (CSTE). The diagnosis brought a sense of relief to his family, who had been struggling to understand his difficulties in communication and mood control.

MacIver's family observed notable changes in his behavior in the months leading up to his death, including erratic conduct and issues with body temperature regulation, which they later learned could be associated with the brain damage caused by CTE.

Finally, MacIver had discussed the possibility of donating his brain for scientific research after hearing about the post-mortem study of former NHL player Derek Boogaard, whose brain also showed significant damage from CTE. His family donated his brain, spinal fluid, and eyes for research on early detection of CTE, contributing to the ongoing efforts to better understand and mitigate this condition.
