= Brian Marcil =

Canadian football player

No. 71 (CGY)
- Position: Linebacker

Personal information
- Born: April 6, 1948 (age 78); Richmond, Quebec, Canada

Career information
- College: Loyola College (Montreal)

Career history
- 1970–1972: Calgary Stampeders
- 1972: Montreal Alouettes
- 1973–1974: Calgary Stampeders
- 1975: Ottawa Rough Riders

Awards and highlights
- Grey Cup champion (1971)

Brian Marcil (born April 6, 1948) is a former professional football player in the Canadian Football League.

Marcil was born in Richmond, Quebec, and graduated from Loyola College in Montreal, where he starred on the Warriors' undefeated 1968 team (which has since been inducted into Concordia University's Sports Hall of Fame.)

He had a 6-year CFL career, mostly with the Calgary Stampeders (5 years and 46 games from 1970 to 1974) where he played on the Grey Cup winning 1971 team. He also had a short stint with the Montreal Alouettes (9 games in 1972) and finished his career with 2 games for the Ottawa Rough Riders in 1975.

Later Marcil became Vice President of the Alouettes Alumni Association, played for the Montreal Irish Rugby Football Club, and entered the commercial real estate business.
