= Al Bloomingdale =

American gridiron football player (born 1953)

No. 31
- Position: Running back

Personal information
- Born: March 1, 1953 (age 73)
- Listed height: 6 ft 2 in (1.88 m)
- Listed weight: 210 lb (95 kg)

Career information
- College: Rice (1971); Barstow JC (1972); Maryland (1973–1974)

Career history
- 1975: Ottawa Rough Riders
- 1975–1976: Toronto Argonauts

Alan Bloomingdale (born March 1, 1953) is an American former professional football running back who played two seasons in the Canadian Football League (CFL) with the Ottawa Rough Riders and Toronto Argonauts. He played college football at the University of Maryland, College Park.

== Early life and college ==
Alan Bloomingdale was born on March 1, 1953. He attended Barstow High School in Barstow, California.

Bloomingdale first enrolled at Rice University and was a member of the Rice Owls' freshman team in 1971. He played at Barstow Community College in 1972. He was then a two-year letterman for the Maryland Terrapins of the University of Maryland, College Park from 1973 to 1974. Bloomingdale rushed 69 times for 295 yards and two touchdowns in 1973 while also catching one pass for two yards. In 1974, he recorded 44 rushing attempts for 226 yards and one touchdown and 15 receptions for 185 yards.

== Professional career ==
Bloomingdale played in two games for the Ottawa Rough Riders of the Canadian Football League (CFL) in 1975, rushing eight times for 23 yards while also returning one kickoff for 18 yards.

Bloomingdale appeared in three games for the Toronto Argonauts of the CFL during the 1975 season, totaling 18 carries for 102 yards, two catches for 55 yards, and two kickoff returns for 26 yards. He played in five games for the Argonauts in 1976, recording 33 rushing attempts for 116 yards, four receptions for 38 yards and one touchdown, and one kickoff return for 19 yards.
