= Marv Allemang =

Canadian football player (born 1953)

Profile
- Positions: Centre, defensive end, guard, defensive tackle

Personal information
- Born: 12 March 1953 (age 73); Ancaster, Ontario, Canada
- Listed height: 6 ft 3 in (1.91 m)
- Listed weight: 255 lb (116 kg)

Career information
- High school: Ancaster HS
- University: Acadia University
- CFL draft: 1975: 1st round, 7th overall pick

Career history
- 1975–1976: Ottawa Rough Riders
- 1977–1978: Hamilton Tiger-Cats
- 1979–1981: Winnipeg Blue Bombers
- 1982–1986: Hamilton Tiger-Cats
- 1987–1988: Ottawa Rough Riders

Awards and highlights
- 2× Grey Cup champion (1976, 1986); 2× CFL East All-Star (1985, 1986); 2× All-Canadian (1973, 1974)

Marv Allemang (born 3 December 1953) is a Canadian former professional football offensive lineman and defensive lineman who played 14 seasons in the Canadian Football League (CFL). He most notably played center for the Hamilton Tiger-Cats and Ottawa Rough Riders later in his career.

Allemang played for Acadia University and was nominated for the J. P. Metras Trophy for outstanding intercollegiate lineman in 1974. He played for the Rough Riders from 1975 to 1976. After winning the 64th Grey Cup with the Rough Riders, Allemang spent one season with the Tiger-Cats. From 1979 to 1981, he played for the Winnipeg Blue Bombers before returning to Hamilton from 1982 to 1986. He was part of the 74th Grey Cup championship-winning Hamilton Tiger-Cats in the 1986 CFL season. He returned to spend his final two years in the CFL with Ottawa, retiring after the 1988–89 season.

== College career ==
Allemang played college football for the Acadia Axemen as both a tight end and defensive lineman until 1974. He was named an Atlantic Universities Athletic Association (AUAA) All-Star three times during his career. Allemang was also named an All-Canadian as a junior and senior. In his final year with the Axemen, Allemang was the AUAA nominee for the newly created J. P. Metras Trophy, an award for the most outstanding lineman in Canadian intercollegiate football.

== Professional career ==
=== Ottawa Rough Riders ===
Allemang was selected in the first round of the 1975 CFL draft by the Ottawa Rough Riders with the seventh overall pick. He played in all regular season games with the Rough Riders from 1975 to 1976. In the 1975 season, the Rough Riders lost in the East Division Final. The following season, they won the 64th Grey Cup, making Allemang a Grey Cup champion for the first time.

=== Hamilton Tiger-Cats ===
Allemang was signed by the Hamilton Tiger-Cats before the 1977 season, and he went on to play in 31 games for the Tiger-Cats through 1978. He was used in a variety of roles. While Al Romano was injured in 1978, Allemang featured as a starting defensive lineman. He later replaced the injured Bruce Holland as a defensive tackle. Outside of these brief stints as a starter, Allemang served as a back-up for both the offensive and defensive lines.

=== Winnipeg Blue Bombers ===
On 18 May 1979, the Hamilton Tiger-Cats traded Allemang and a draft pick to the Winnipeg Blue Bombers for linebacker Harry Walters and defensive end Jim Heighton. The retirement of the Buddy Brown left the Blue Bombers looking for an offensive guard, and they transitioned Allemang into this role on the right side of the offensive line. Allemang played in all 16 regular season games during the 1979 season, primarily on the offense. He returned to the defensive line in 1980 and alternated between the offense and defense for the remainder of his time with the Blue Bombers. In 1981, Allemang saw a reduced role, playing in only four games. After playing 36 total regular season games with the Blue Bombers, Allemang was cut in October 1981.

=== Return to Tiger-Cats ===
In March 1982, it was reported that the Montreal Alouettes were about to sign Allemang, but he instead joined the Tiger-Cats the following month. In 1983, Allemang was part of an offensive line that was described as "the worst in the CFL", but they allowed the fewest quarterback sacks and advanced to the East Final before losing to the Toronto Argonauts. The Tiger-Cats advanced to the Grey Cup in 1984 but lost to the Blue Bombers after the offensive line created only 24 rushing yards on nine carries. In 1985, Allemang was converted from an offensive tackle to a center, and his performance in his new role was described as "commendable" by head coach Al Bruno. Allemang was named an East Division all-star and nominated for the Leo Dandurand Trophy, which goes to the East Division's most outstanding offensive lineman. The Tiger-Cats again appeared in the Grey Cup game, losing to the BC Lions 37–24. In the championship game, the offensive line blocked to allow 213 rushing yards on 24 carries. Allemang remained a center in 1986 and received his second East Division all-star distinction. The Tiger-Cats won the 74th Grey Cup against the Edmonton Eskimos 39–15 after entering the game as severe underdogs, providing Allemang with his second Grey Cup ring.

=== Return to Rough Riders and retirement ===
Following the 1986 season, the CFL held an equalization draft in which the three teams that did not qualify for playoffs could draft certain players from the six teams that qualified for playoffs. In the equalization draft, the Ottawa Rough Riders acquired Allemang. The draft, which was held in secret and intentionally hidden from the media, received harsh criticism from the teams which lost players. Tiger-Cats personnel director Mike McCarthy referred to the equalization draft as a "socialist draft", and Allemang expressed discontent with the unexpected move to Ottawa.

Allemang remained in his role as a center with the Rough Riders. In 1987, he played in 11 regular season games, missing time due to a knee injury which required surgery. Allemang re-signed with the Rough Riders before the 1988 season and went on to play in all 18 games. For the second time, he was nominated for the Leo Dandurand Trophy.

In March 1989, incoming head coach Steve Goldman developed a long-term strategy for the Rough Riders that involved a focus on developing younger players. As part of his efforts, Goldman gave Allemang an ultimatum to retire or be released from the team, and Allemang announced his retirement later that month.

== Later life ==
After retiring from football, Allemang became a tax investigator with Revenue Canada, the Canadian tax agency. In 1996, he became a firefighter in Ancaster, Ontario, a position from which he retired in 2013.
