= Ken Ferguson (Canadian football) =

Canadian gridiron football player (born 1944)

Profile
- Positions: Center, Linebacker

Personal information
- Born: March 21, 1944 (age 82); Saskatoon, Saskatchewan
- Listed height: 6 ft 1 in (1.85 m)
- Listed weight: 230 lb (104 kg)

Career information
- College: Utah State

Career history
- 1967–1968: BC Lions
- 1969–1971: Edmonton Eskimos
- 1972: Hamilton Tiger-Cats
- 1972: Edmonton Eskimos
- 1973–1975: Hamilton Tiger-Cats

Awards and highlights
- Grey Cup champion (1972)

Ken Ferguson (born March 21, 1944) was a Canadian professional football player who played for the Edmonton Eskimos, BC Lions and Hamilton Tiger-Cats. He won the Grey Cup with Hamilton in 1972. He played college football at Utah State University.
