= Al Charuk =

Canadian football player (born 1954)

Profile
- Position: Wide receiver

Personal information
- Born: June 21, 1954 (age 72); Moncton, New Brunswick, Canada
- Listed height: 5 ft 11 in (1.80 m)
- Listed weight: 185 lb (84 kg)

Career information
- University: Acadia
- CFL draft: 1975: 1st round, 2nd overall pick

Career history
- 1975–1976: Toronto Argonauts
- 1977–1982: BC Lions

Awards and highlights
- Hec Crighton Trophy (1974)

Alan Charuk (born June 21, 1954) is a former wide receiver who played eight seasons in the Canadian Football League (CFL) for the Toronto Argonauts and the BC Lions. Charuk played college football at Acadia University and won the Hec Crighton Trophy in 1974 as the most outstanding Canadian university player.
