= Roger Goree =

American gridiron football player (born 1951)

Profile
- Position: Linebacker

Personal information
- Born: November 4, 1951 (age 75)
- Listed height: 6 ft 0 in (1.83 m)
- Listed weight: 205 lb (93 kg)

Career information
- College: Baylor
- NFL draft: 1973: 15th round, 365th overall pick

Career history
- 1973–1974: Calgary Stampeders
- 1975–1980: Saskatchewan Roughriders

Awards and highlights
- 2× CFL All-Star (1974, 1976); 4× CFL West All-Star (1973, 1974, 1976, 1977); First-team All-American (1972); 2× First-team All-SWC (1971, 1972); Second-team All-SWC (1970)

Roger Goree (born November 4, 1951) is an American former professional Canadian football player who played in the Canadian Football League (CFL) for eight seasons. Goree played linebacker for the Calgary Stampeders and Saskatchewan Roughriders from 1973 to 1980. He played college football at Baylor University. He was an All-American in 1972.
