= Gerry Shaw =

Canadian gridiron football player (1943–1995)

No. 72
- Positions: End, Wide receiver

Personal information
- Born: 1943; Calgary, Alberta, Canada
- Died: March 18, 1995 (aged 51–52); Calgary, Alberta, Canada
- Listed height: 6 ft 1 in (1.85 m)
- Listed weight: 195 lb (88 kg)

Career information
- College: Washington State

Career history
- 1965–1974: Calgary Stampeders

Awards and highlights
- Grey Cup champion (1971); Second-team All-PCC (1963)

Gerry Shaw (1943 – March 18, 1995) was a Canadian professional football player who played for the Calgary Stampeders. He won the Grey Cup with them in 1971. Shaw played college football at Washington State University. He was added to the Stampeders' Wall of Fame in 2012. He died on March 18, 1995.
