= Howard Starks (Canadian football) =

Canadian gridiron football player (born 1944)

No. 11
- Positions: Halfback, Defensive back

Personal information
- Born: December 25, 1944 (age 81)
- Listed height: 6 ft 1 in (1.85 m)
- Listed weight: 185 lb (84 kg)

Career information
- College: Wichita State

Career history
- 1966: Montreal Alouettes
- 1966, 1969–1975: Calgary Stampeders

Awards and highlights
- Grey Cup champion (1971)

Howard Starks (born December 25, 1944) was a Canadian football player who played for the Calgary Stampeders and Montreal Alouettes. He won the Grey Cup with Calgary in 1971. He played college football at Wichita State University.
