= Dick Wesolowski =

Canadian gridiron football player (born 1945)

Profile
- Positions: Halfback, Running back, Fullback

Personal information
- Born: December 5, 1945 (age 80); Hamilton, Ontario, Canada
- Listed height: 6 ft 2 in (1.88 m)
- Listed weight: 233 lb (106 kg)

Career information
- College: North Carolina

Career history
- 1969–1972: Hamilton Tiger-Cats
- 1973–1976: Calgary Stampeders

Awards and highlights
- Grey Cup champion (1972)

Dick Wesolowski (born December 5, 1945) is a Canadian former professional football player who played for the Hamilton Tiger-Cats and Calgary Stampeders. He won the Grey Cup with Hamilton in 1972. Wesolowski played college football at University of North Carolina at Chapel Hill.
