= Fred James (Canadian football) =

Canadian football player (1945–2016)

No. 47
- Positions: Guard, Defensive lineman

Personal information
- Born: February 13, 1945; Edmonton, Alberta, Canada
- Died: June 15, 2016 (aged 71); Calgary, Alberta, Canada
- Listed height: 6 ft 5 in (1.96 m)
- Listed weight: 255 lb (116 kg)

Career information
- University: Alberta

Career history
- 1967–1975: Calgary Stampeders
- 1975: Edmonton Eskimos

Awards and highlights
- Grey Cup champion (1971, 1975)

Frederick Lorne James (February 13, 1945 – June 15, 2016) was a Canadian professional football player who played for the Calgary Stampeders and Edmonton Eskimos. He won the Grey Cup with Calgary in 1971 and one with Edmonton 1975. He played college football at the University of Alberta in Edmonton.

James was born in Edmonton and worked in the insurance industry after his football career. He also worked with the Canadian Football League Players' Association.
