= Max Huber (Canadian football) =

American gridiron football player (1945–2018)

Profile
- Position: Tackle

Personal information
- Born: October 8, 1945; Mesa, Arizona, U.S.
- Died: December 7, 2018 (aged 73); Utah, U.S.
- Listed height: 6 ft 3 in (1.91 m)
- Listed weight: 252 lb (114 kg)

Career information
- High school: Mesa
- College: BYU
- NFL draft: 1968: 13th round, 332nd overall pick

Career history
- 1968: Edmonton Eskimos
- 1968–71: BC Lions
- 1971: Hamilton Tigercats
- 1972–77: Calgary Stampeders
- 1977: Montreal Alouettes

Awards and highlights
- Grey Cup champion (1977)

Max Henry Huber (October 8, 1945 – December 7, 2018) was a Grey Cup champion offensive lineman who played ten seasons in the Canadian Football League (CFL), winning the Grey Cup Championship with the Montreal Alouettes.

A graduate of Brigham Young University, Huber started his career with the Edmonton Eskimos and then went on to four seasons with the BC Lions, playing 45 regular season games. After a half season with the Hamilton Tigercats and 6 with the Calgary Stampeders, he finished playing 10 games with the Alouettes.
