= Rick Galbos =

American football player (1951–2026)

Profile
- Position: Running back

Personal information
- Born: July 21, 1951; Cleveland, Ohio, US
- Died: August 5, 2026 (aged 75); Calgary, Alberta, Canada
- Listed height: 6 ft 1 in (1.85 m)
- Listed weight: 205 lb (93 kg)

Career information
- High school: Mentor (Mentor, Ohio)
- College: Ohio State
- NFL draft: 1973: 9th round, 218th overall pick

Career history
- 1973–1977: Calgary Stampeders
- 1977: Montreal Alouettes
- 1978: Washington Redskins*
- * Offseason or practice squad member only

Awards and highlights
- Grey Cup champion (1977); National champion (1970)

Career CFL statistics
- Rushing attempts: 277
- Rushing yards: 1,244
- Rushing touchdowns: 3
- Receptions: 172
- Receiving yards: 2,016
- Receiving touchdowns: 8

Richard Thomas Galbos (July 21, 1951 – August 5, 2026) was an American professional football player who was a running back in the Canadian Football League (CFL). He played college football for the Ohio State Buckeyes.

== Early life ==
Born in Cleveland, Galbos grew up in Mentor, Ohio, and attended Mentor High School, where he was a member of the track, swimming and football teams. As a senior, he quarterbacked Mentor to an undefeated season and the number two ranking in the state while also passing and rushing for 900 yards. Galbos was inducted into the News-Herald High School Sports Hall of Fame in 2016.

== College career ==
Galbos attended Ohio State University, where he was a member of the Buckeyes for four seasons. He was moved to running back and was the team's starting wingback as a junior and as a senior, when he was also a team captain. He finished his collegiate career with 859 rushing yards on 197 carries and 4 touchdowns and caught 21 passes for 293 yards and one touchdown.

== Professional career ==
Galbos was selected in the ninth round of the 1973 NFL draft by the Washington Redskins, but opted to instead sign with the Saskatchewan Roughriders of the Canadian Football League (CFL). The Roughriders traded him to the Calgary Stampeders before the start of his rookie season. That season he served primarily as a blocking back for Willie Burden. Galbos was traded to the Montreal Alouettes during the 1977 season and was a member of the team as they won the Grey Cup. After the season he was signed by the Redskins and suffered a hamstring injury in training camp.

== Post-football ==
Galbos remained in Canada after his playing career ended and worked in the construction business. He died on August 5, 2026, at the age of 75.
