= Joe Forzani =

Canadian gridiron football player (born 1945)

No. 73
- Position: Guard

Personal information
- Born: July 30, 1945 (age 81); Calgary, Alberta, Canada
- Listed height: 6 ft 2 in (1.88 m)
- Listed weight: 245 lb (111 kg)

Career information
- College: Utah State
- NFL draft: 1968: 17th round, 448th overall pick

Career history
- 1968–1975: Calgary Stampeders

Awards and highlights
- Grey Cup champion (1971)

Joe Forzani (born June 30, 1945) is a Canadian former professional football player who played for the Calgary Stampeders. He won the Grey Cup with them in 1971. He played college football at Utah State University. Joe and two of his brothers, John and Tom, all played together with the Calgary Stampeders. John and Tom also attended Utah State University.
