= Tom Forzani =

Canadian gridiron football player (born 1951)

No. 22
- Position: Wide receiver

Personal information
- Born: June 15, 1951 (age 75); Calgary, Alberta, Canada
- Listed height: 5 ft 11 in (1.80 m)
- Listed weight: 180 lb (82 kg)

Career information
- College: Utah State

Career history
- 1973–1983: Calgary Stampeders

Awards and highlights
- Dr. Beattie Martin Trophy (1975); CFL All-Star (1977); 3× CFL West All-Star (1973, 1974, 1977)

Tom Forzani (born June 15, 1951) is a Canadian former professional football wide receiver for the CFL Calgary Stampeders. He played from 1973 to 1983 for the Stampeders.

He is one of three Forzani brothers to play for their hometown Stampeders, along with Joe and John. Forzani's son, Johnny Forzani, also played for the Stampeders.

Tom was an all-star selection at wide receiver in 1973, '74 and '77. Tom lead the Stampeders in receiving in 5 season and had 50 or more catches in 7 seasons. He had at least one reception in 11 consecutive season, tied for the club lead with Allen Pitts.

His No. 22 was retired by the Stampeders in 1984.

He played college football at Utah State University, as did brothers Joe and John. Son Johnny played for Washington State University.
