= John Forzani =

Canadian football player and businessman

- Born: April 5, 1947; Calgary, Alberta, Canada
- Died: October 30, 2014 (aged 67); Palm Springs, California, U.S.
- Education: Utah State University
- Occupations: football player, owner, businessman
- Football career

No. 54 – Calgary Stampeders
- Title: Owner, OL

Career history

Playing
- 1971–1976: Calgary Stampeders

Operations
- 2005–2012: Calgary Stampeders (co-owner)

business owner
- 1974–2014: FGL Sports

Awards and highlights
- Grey Cup champion (1971)

John Forzani (April 5, 1947 – October 30, 2014) was a Canadian businessman, former Canadian Football League (CFL) player, and CFL team owner. He was the chairman and co-founder of FGL Sports.

== Early life ==
Born in Calgary, Alberta, he received a degree in business administration from Utah State University in 1971. In 1971, he joined the Calgary Stampeders as an offensive lineman and was part of the winning team of the 59th Grey Cup. He played football until 1976.

== Career ==
In 1974, he opened a 1,200-square-foot (110 m^{2}) store called Forzani's Locker Room in Calgary. In 1994, he acquired Sports Experts Inc. for $20 million becoming Canada's largest sporting goods retailer.

In 2001, the Retail Council of Canada recognized Forzani's work in leading FGL Sports (then known as the Forzani Group) to outstanding business success. In recognition of this accomplishment he was presented with the Distinguished Canadian Retailer of the Year Award.

In 2005, he became a part owner of the Calgary Stampeders. In June 2005, Concordia University conferred an honorary doctorate at the convocation ceremony for the John Molson School of Business, and he gave the address to the graduates.

== Personal ==
John and two of his brothers, Joe and Tom, all played together with the Calgary Stampeders. Joe and Tom also attended Utah State University. Forzani died of a heart attack on October 30, 2014.
