= Autostade =

Canadian football stadium at Quebec

Coordinates: 45.487982°N 73.545259°W

Autostade Automotive Stadium
- Interactive map of Autostade; Automotive Stadium
- Capacity: 33,172
- Surface: Grass (1966–1976)

Construction
- Opened: 1966
- Demolished: late 1970s
- Architects: Victor Prus and Maurice Desnoyers

Tenants
- Montreal Alouettes (CFL) (1968–1971, 1973-1976); Montreal Olympique (NASL) (1971, 1973)

The Autostade (the English name Automotive Stadium was rarely used) was a Canadian football stadium in the Victoriatown neighbourhood of Montreal, Quebec that stood at the north-west corner of the Cité du Havre sector of the Expo 67 site. It was the home of the CFL's Montreal Alouettes from 1968 to 1976, except for a brief period in 1972 when the team returned to its previous home, Molson Stadium.

== Design and financing ==
The Autostade was built in preparation for the 1967 World's Fair, Expo 67 as a venue for several events including the World Music Festival and the Rodeo Show. It was designed by architects Victor Prus and Maurice Desnoyers. With a seating capacity of 33,172, the stadium is best remembered for its odd shape: to allow the stadium to be dismantled and re-erected on a new site if required, the architects employed a segmental structural system comprising 19 independent but linked pre-cast concrete grandstands, each 40 seats wide, arranged around the central field.

The stadium was financed by donations from the five major auto manufacturers in Canada at the time: American Motors, Chrysler, Ford, General Motors, and Volvo, hence its name.

== History ==
From the start, the new stadium was configured for CFL football use. The first CFL game played at the Autostade was the 1966 Eastern final between the Ottawa Rough Riders and Hamilton Tiger-Cats, held on November 19. The Rough Riders would have hosted the game, but Lansdowne Park was undergoing extensive renovations at the time. Ottawa won the game 42-16. This game also marked the first use of the single-shaft "goose-necked" field goal posts in the CFL (which has become the norm in professional football since; the NFL and NCAA later adopted those model goalposts the next year).

It was originally planned that Montreal's new baseball team, the Montreal Expos, would play home games at the Autostade as well for at least their first two seasons. However, the city was unwilling to pay the cost of adding a dome, thought to be a must because of Montreal's often bitterly cold springs and falls. The Alouettes demanded steep rent payments in order to let the Expos share the stadium. Even without these factors to consider, since the Autostade was owned by the federal government, there were some doubts that the city even had the authority to renovate it. Instead, the Expos opted to use Jarry Park.

Following its use in Expo 67, the gaps between the sections were filled in preparation for the Alouettes' 1968 season. However, the stadium was considered by many to be located too far from downtown (a complaint that would be echoed years later regarding Olympic Stadium) as well as too cold due to its proximity to the Saint Lawrence River. As a result, crowds declined rapidly. Despite this, those fans that did attend remember the stadium as having an intimate atmosphere well suited to CFL football.

The only Grey Cup contest at the Autostade was played on November 30, 1969, between the Ottawa Rough Riders and Saskatchewan Roughriders. Due to fears about FLQ terrorist activities, the CFL had 300 police officers in full riot gear on standby just in case anything got out of hand, but there were no incidents. Ottawa's Russ Jackson and Frank Clair both ended their Hall of Fame careers with a 29-11 win over Saskatchewan. This game was featured in the 1969 movie Deux femmes en or and is chronicled in TSN's 2012 documentary series of films "Engraved on a Nation".

Crowds remained small for the next two seasons. The 1971 CFL All Star Game attracted little attention, and the Alouettes ownership decided to return to Molson Stadium in 1972, hoping to increase profitability. The plan backfired, with attendance below 15,000 a game, and the team returned to the Autostade the following year. The stadium fell into disuse after the Alouettes moved to Olympic Stadium following the 1976 Summer Olympics.

In 1978, the city of Thetford Mines paid $350,000 to acquire five of the 19 original bleacher sections, transport them to the city 143 miles (228 kilometers) northeast of Montreal, and reassemble them on the site of the city's former minor league ballpark. The balance of the Autostade was demolished in 1979, but the reconstructed stadium (now known as Stade des Caisses Desjardins) has hosted amateur baseball and softball since construction was completed in 1980. In 2010, the Thetford Blue Sox, a semi-professional baseball team in the Ligue de Baseball Senior Élite du Québec began play in the stadium.

In May 2005, the Montreal Impact soccer club had announced that they would be building a new stadium near the former location of the Autostade (now a parking lot and transformer station). The Impact later changed their plans, and broke ground on a new stadium in Olympic Park in the spring of 2007 which opened as Saputo Stadium in 2008.
