= Alberta Golden Bears football =

University football team in Edmonton, Alberta, Canada

Alberta Golden Bears
- Alberta Golden Bears logo
- First season: 1910
- Athletic director: Ian Reade
- Head coach: Stevenson Bone; 2nd year, 2–14 (.125)
- Home stadium: Foote Field
- Year built: 2001
- Stadium capacity: 3500
- Stadium surface: PureGrass
- Location: Edmonton, Alberta
- League: U Sports
- Conference: Canada West
- All-time record: 355–365–9 (.493)
- Postseason record: –

Titles
- Vanier Cups: 3; 1967, 1972, 1980
- Churchill Bowls: 4; 1971, 1972, 1980, 1981
- Hardy Cups: 18; 1922, 1926, 1928, 1944, 1946, 1947, 1948, 1960, 1962, 1963, 1964, 1965, 1967, 1971, 1972, 1979, 1980, 1981
- Hec Crighton winners: 3 Mel Smith, Brian Fryer, Ed Ilnicki

Current uniform
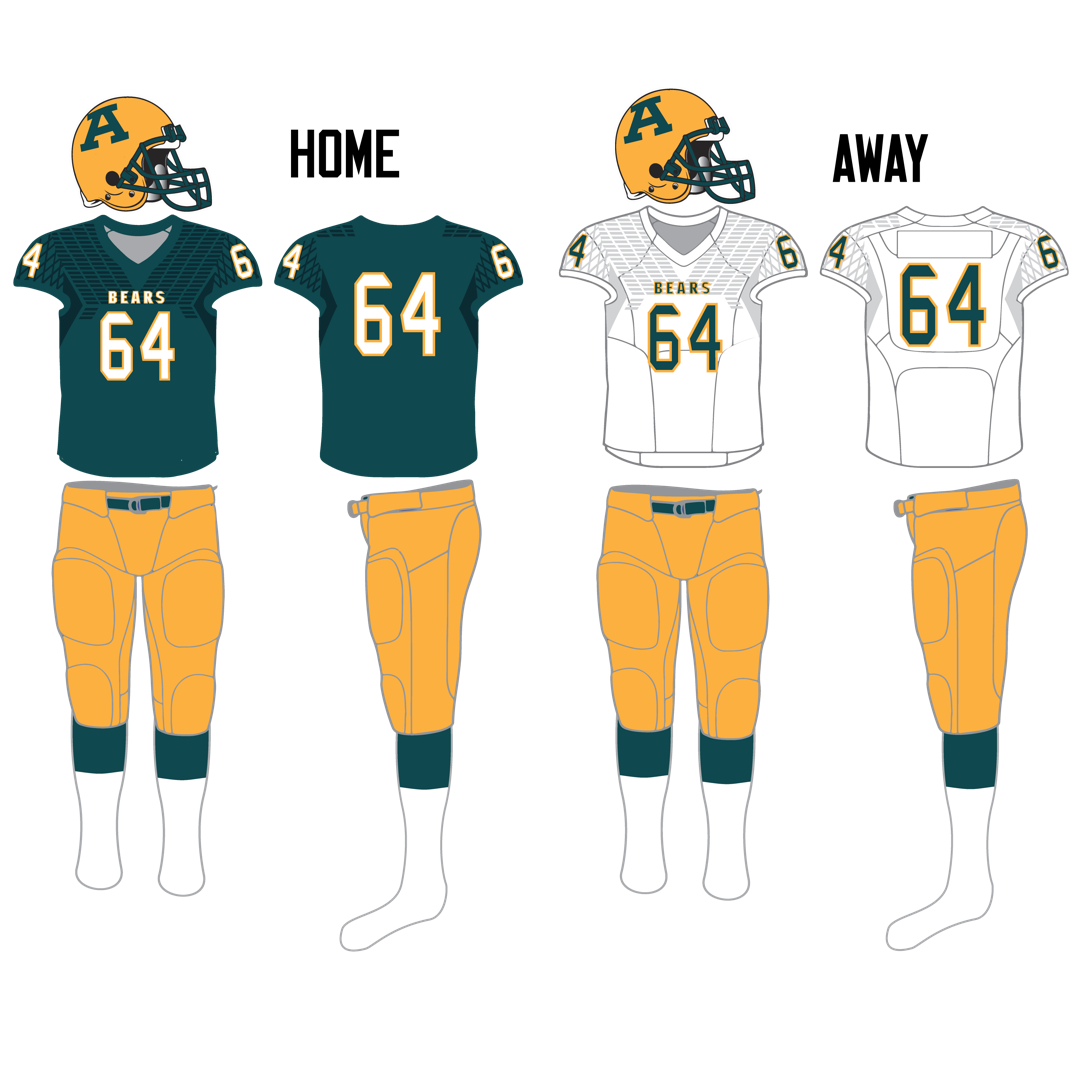
- Colours: Green and Gold
- Rivals: Calgary Dinos
- Website: bears.ualberta.ca

The Alberta Golden Bears football team represents the University of Alberta in the sport of Canadian football in U Sports. The Golden Bears have been in competition since 1910 and the team has won three Vanier Cup national championships, in 1967, 1972, and most recently in 1980. The Golden Bears have also won 18 Hardy Cup conference titles, second only to the Saskatchewan Huskies who have won 19 of them. The Golden Bears have also had three players win the Hec Crighton Trophy, with Mel Smith winning in 1971, Brian Fryer winning in 1975, and most recently Ed Ilnicki winning the award in 2017.

== Recent history ==
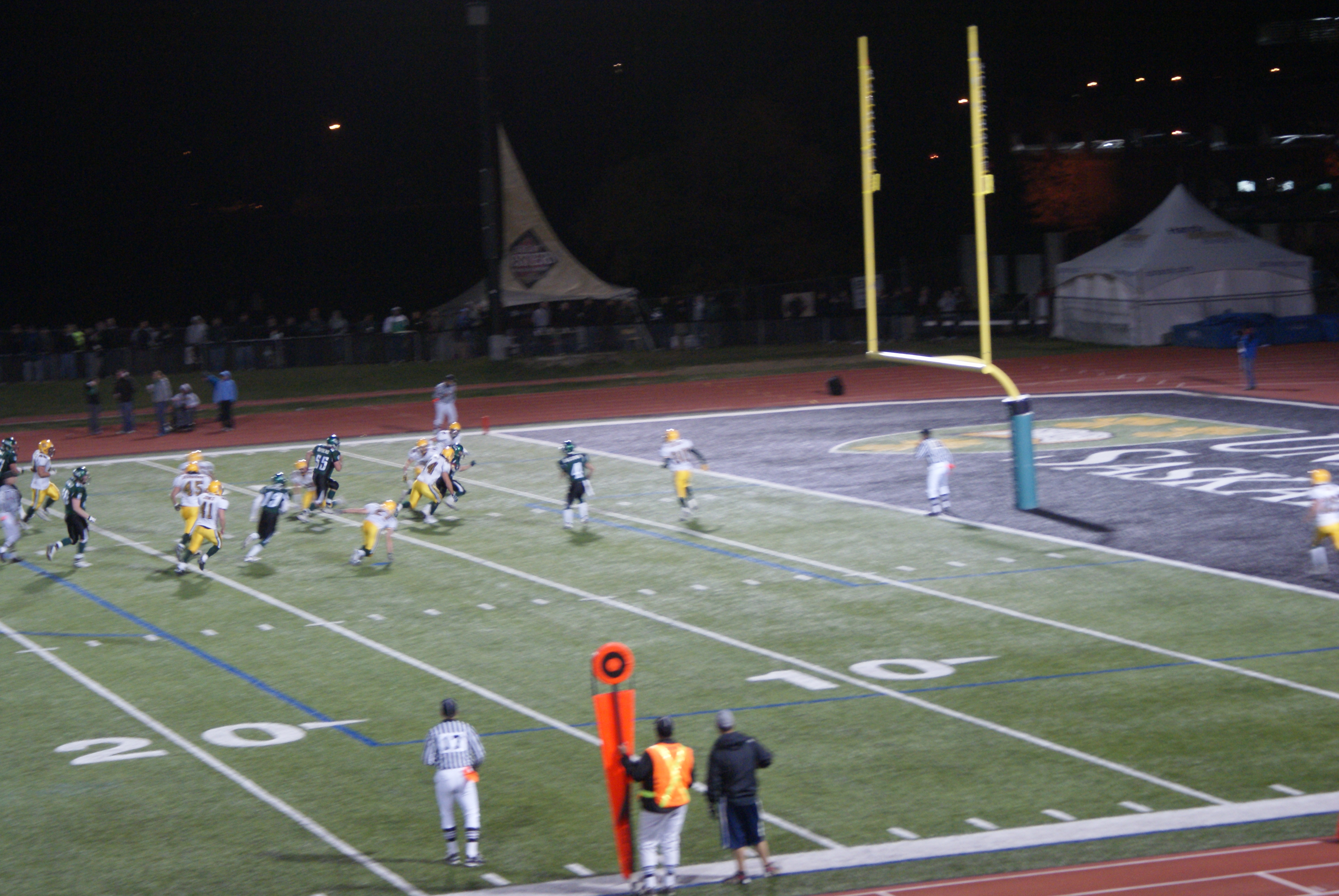
The Golden Bears vs the Saskatchewan Huskies football team in 2008.

In the 2000s, the Golden Bears had seen mixed results as the team made the playoffs in five of ten seasons between 2001 and 2010. In four of those seasons, Alberta reached the Hardy Cup, but came away with losses each time. Despite playing in the Hardy Cup in 2010, the Golden Bears finished winless in 2011 following the resignation of longtime head coach Jerry Friesen. UBC defaulted two wins to Alberta that year, but the following season was once again winless as the Golden Bears finished at the bottom of the standings. The Golden Bears saw improvement in 2014 by posting a 3-5 record, but finished fifth and missed the playoffs for the fourth straight year. The program saw further regression in 2015 and 2016, posting just two and one win seasons, respectively.

In 2017, the Golden Bears returned to the playoffs following a six-year absence by qualifying in the last week of the season by defeating the powerhouse Calgary Dinos and finishing 3-5. Because UBC and Manitoba finished with 2-6 records, the Golden Bears finished in fourth place and in playoff position, led by the strong play of Hec Crighton Trophy winner, Ed Ilnicki. The team lost the Canada West Semi-Final to the same Dinos by a score of 39-22. In the following year, the team was once again out of the playoffs, finishing 2-6, which included a default win after the Regina Rams had to forfeit a victory due to the use of an ineligible player.

== Recent season results ==
Season	Games	Won	Lost	OTL	PCT	PF	PA	Standing	Playoffs
2001	8	2	5	1	.313	139	217	6th in CW	Out of Playoffs
2002	8	1	7	0	.125	141	186	7th in CW	Out of Playoffs
2003	8	4	4	0	.500	262	164	4th in CW	Defeated Saskatchewan Huskies in semi-final 10-4; Lost to Simon Fraser Clan in Hardy Cup 28-18
2004	8	7	1	0	.875	235	145	1st in CW	Defeated Calgary Dinos in semi-final 39-13; Lost to Saskatchewan Huskies in Hardy Cup 21-20
2005	8	7	1	0	.875	226	149	2nd in CW	Defeated Manitoba Bisons in semi-final 33-24; Lost to Saskatchewan Huskies in Hardy Cup 30-17
2006	8	4	4	0	.500	163	198	5th in CW	Out of Playoffs
2007	8	2	6	0	.250	176	204	6th in CW	Out of Playoffs
2008	8	2	6	0	.250	140	194	7th in CW	Out of Playoffs
2009	8	4	4	0	.500	164	203	3rd in CW	Lost to Calgary Dinos in semi-final 45-13
2010	8	3	5	0	.375	177	220	4th in CW	Defeated Saskatchewan Huskies in semi-final 31-30; Lost to Calgary Dinos in Hardy Cup 56-3
2011	8	2	6	0	.250	73	274	5th in CW	Out of Playoffs
2012	8	0	8	0	.000	82	305	6th in CW	Out of Playoffs
2013	8	0	8	0	.000	188	419	6th in CW	Out of Playoffs
2014	8	3	5	0	.375	228	292	5th in CW	Out of Playoffs
2015	8	2	6	0	.250	183	356	5th in CW	Out of Playoffs
2016	8	1	7	0	.125	155	355	6th in CW	Out of Playoffs
2017	8	3	5	0	.375	275	276	4th in CW	Lost to Calgary Dinos in semi-final 39-22
2018	8	2	6	0	.250	109	251	5th in CW	Out of Playoffs
2019	8	4	4	0	.500	179	208	3rd in CW	Lost to Saskatchewan Huskies in semi-final 28-23
2020	Season cancelled due to COVID-19 pandemic								
2021	6	3	3	0	.500	174	186	3rd in CW	Lost to Manitoba Bisons in semi-final 43-17
2022	8	3	5	0	.375	175	201	5th in CW	Out of Playoffs
2023	6	6	2	0	.750	247	196	2nd in CW	Defeated Saskatchewan Huskies in semi-final 40-17; Lost to UBC Thunderbirds in Hardy Cup 28-27
2024	8	2	6	0	.250	231	229	6th in CW	Out of Playoffs
2025	8	1	7	0	.125	180	238	6th in CW	Out of Playoffs
2026	8	1	7	0	.125	130	298	6th in CW	Out of Playoffs

== National postseason results ==
Vanier Cup Era (1965-current)
Year	Game	Opponent	Result
1965	Vanier Cup	Toronto	L 7-14
1967	Vanier Cup	McMaster	W 10-9
1971	Churchill Bowl Vanier Cup	Bishop's Western	W 53-2 L 14-15
1972	Churchill Bowl Vanier Cup	Loyola Waterloo Lutheran	W 58-6 W 20-7
1979	Atlantic Bowl	Acadia	L 7-23
1980	Churchill Bowl Vanier Cup	Western Ottawa	W 14-4 W 40-21
1981	Churchill Bowl Vanier Cup	Western Acadia	W 32-31 L 12-18

Alberta is 4-1 in national semi-final games and 3-3 in the Vanier Cup.

== Head coaches ==
Name	Years	Notes
W. M. Edwards	1910–1912	
Whitney Lailey	1913	
Gordon McGuire	1914–1915	
No Team	1916–1918	
York Blayney	1919	
D. A. McGibbon	1920–1921	
Jimmy Bill	1922–1926	
Miles Palmer	1927	
Wallace Sterling	1928–1929	
Bud Morgan	1930–1931	
Ken Thompson	1932	
Al Wilson	1933–1934	
Jake Jamieson	1935–1936	
Bill Broadfoot	1937–1939	
Bob Fritz	1940–1941	
Tommy Hays	1942–1944	
Maury Van Vliet	1945–1947	
Don Smith	1948	
No Team	1949–1958	
Steve Mendryk	1959	
Murray Smith	1960–1961	
Clare Drake	1962	
Gino Fracas	1963–1966	
Clare Drake	1967–1968	
Harvey Scott	1969–1970	
Jim Donlevy	1971–1981	
Jim Lazaruk	1982–1983	
Jim Donlevy	1984–1990	
Tom Wilkinson	1991–2000	
Jerry Friesen	2001–2010	
Jeff Stead	2011–2012	
Chris Morris	2013–2024	
Stevenson Bone	2025–present	

== National award winners ==
- Hec Crighton Trophy: Mel Smith (1971), Brian Fryer (1975), Ed Ilnicki (2017)
- J. P. Metras Trophy: Gerry Inglis (1976), Dave Willox (1978), Garret Everson (1998)
- Presidents' Trophy: Mark Singer (1989), Josiah Schakel (2021)
- Peter Gorman Trophy: Jeff Funtasz (1984)
- Russ Jackson Award: Sam Stetsko (1997), Carlo Panaro (1999, 2000), Chevy Thomas (2025)
- Frank Tindall Trophy: Jim Donlevy (1971), Jerry Friesen (2004)

== Golden Bears in the professional ranks ==
As of the start of the 2026 CFL season, 11 former Golden Bears players were on CFL teams' rosters:

- Ty Anderson, Montreal Alouettes
- Mack Bannatyne, Hamilton Tiger-Cats
- David Beard, Edmonton Elks
- Tyshon Blackburn, Edmonton Elks
- Jayden Dalke, Saskatchewan Roughriders
- Carter Kettyle, Edmonton Elks
- Mark Korte, Edmonton Elks
- Justin Lawrence, Montreal Alouettes
- Carter O'Donnell, Edmonton Elks
- Matthew Peterson, Winnipeg Blue Bombers
- Morgen Runge, Saskatchewan Roughriders
