= 1978 Winnipeg Blue Bombers season =

Canadian football team season

- General manager: Earl Lunsford
- Head coach: Ray Jauch
- Home stadium: Winnipeg Stadium

Results
- Record: 9–7
- Division place: 3rd, West
- Playoffs: Lost Western Semi-Final

The 1978 Winnipeg Blue Bombers finished in third place in the Western Conference with a 9–7 record. They appeared in the Western Semi-Final but lost 38–4 to the Calgary Stampeders.

== Offseason ==
Round	Pick	Player	Position	School
T	T	Leo Ezerins	TE	Whitworth
T	T	Bernie Morrison	LB	Manitoba
T	T	Tim Allan	G	Toronto
1	4	Evan Jones	TE	British Columbia
2	13	Bob Stracina	WR	Acadia
3	22	Vaughn Wright	TB	Guelph
4	31	Julian Hanlon	G	Ottawa
5	40	Dave Neber	DE	British Columbia
6	49	Steve Davis	DT	Bishop's
7	58	Gord Bone	TE	Manitoba
8	67	Duane Hysop	QB	Manitoba

== Roster ==
1978 Winnipeg Blue Bombers final roster
Quarterbacks: 5 Dieter Brock; 6 Harry Knight; 7 Terry Luck; Running backs: 3 Mark Brown; 33 Richard Crump; 35 John McCorquindale; 32 Tom Walker; 27 Jim Washington; Wide receivers: 28 Brian Gervais; 70 Mike Holmes; 34 Gord Paterson; 71 Joe Poplawski; Tight ends: 72 Leo Ezerins	Offensive linemen: 43 John Bonk C; 65 Buddy Brown G; 67 Jeff Hart T; 48 Gerry Inglis C/G; 54 Greg Kindle G; 66 Butch Norman T; 53 Steve Okoniewski T; Defensive linemen: 58 Jim Heighton DE; 73 Billy Howard DT; 74 Greg Johnson DE; 56 Leon Lyszkiewicz DT; 61 Charles Marshall DT; 75 Lyall Woznesensky DE	Linebackers: 50 Duncan MacKinlay; 62 Ron Southwick; 78 Bob Toogood; 52 Harry Walters; Defensive backs: 30 Brian Herosian; 29 Martin Mitchell; 25 Darrell Penner; 9 Vince Phason; 8 Reggie Pierson; 21 Gary Rozolowich; 24 Merv Walker; Special teams: 10 Bernie Ruoff K/P; Italics indicate American player

=== Standings ===
Western Football Conference
Team	GP	W	L	T	PF	PA	Pts
Edmonton Eskimos	16	10	4	2	452	301	22
Calgary Stampeders	16	9	4	3	381	311	21
Winnipeg Blue Bombers	16	9	7	0	371	351	18
BC Lions	16	7	7	2	359	308	16
Saskatchewan Roughriders	16	4	11	1	330	459	9

== Preseason ==
Game	Date	Opponent	Results		Venue	Attendance
Game	Date	Opponent	Score	Record	Venue	Attendance
A	June 14	vs. Saskatchewan Roughriders	W 23–14	1–0	Winnipeg Stadium	22,527
B	June 22	at Toronto Argonauts	L 4–35	1–1	Exhibition Stadium	37,207
C	June 28	at Calgary Stampeders	W 21–10	2–1	McMahon Stadium	23,196
D	July 4	vs. Ottawa Rough Riders	W 28–27	3–1	Winnipeg Stadium	22,795

== Regular season ==
Week	Game	Date	Opponent	Results		Venue	Attendance
Week	Game	Date	Opponent	Score	Record	Venue	Attendance
1	1	Tue, July 11	at BC Lions	L 14–30	0–1	Empire Stadium	25,808
2	2	Tue, July 18	vs. Edmonton Eskimos	L 28–29	0–2	Winnipeg Stadium	25,973
3	Bye						
4	3	Wed, Aug 2	vs. Saskatchewan Roughriders	W 23–13	1–2	Winnipeg Stadium	26,619
5	4	Wed, Aug 9	at Hamilton Tiger-Cats	W 29–7	2–2	Ivor Wynne Stadium	22,647
6	5	Wed, Aug 16	vs. Calgary Stampeders	L 21–29	2–3	Winnipeg Stadium	26,259
7	6	Wed, Aug 23	at Edmonton Eskimos	L 8–14	2–4	Clarke Stadium	24,962
8	7	Tue, Aug 29	vs. Montreal Alouettes	W 36–10	3–4	Winnipeg Stadium	27,201
8	8	Mon, Sept 4	at Saskatchewan Roughriders	W 31–29	4–4	Taylor Field	22,451
9	9	Sat, Sept 9	at Ottawa Rough Riders	W 31–29	5–4	Lansdowne Park	26,282
10	10	Sat, Sept 16	vs. Toronto Argonauts	W 19–14	6–4	Winnipeg Stadium	27,201
11	11	Sun, Sept 24	vs. BC Lions	W 32–25	7–4	Winnipeg Stadium	27,201
12	12	Sat, Sept 30	at BC Lions	W 38–27	8–4	Empire Stadium	23,345
13	Bye						
14	13	Sun, Oct 15	vs. Edmonton Eskimos	L 10–38	8–5	Winnipeg Stadium	28,080
15	14	Sun, Oct 22	at Saskatchewan Roughriders	W 13–7	9–5	Taylor Field	19,614
16	15	Sun, Oct 29	vs. Calgary Stampeders	L 24–28	9–6	Winnipeg Stadium	26,781
17	16	Sun, Nov 5	at Calgary Stampeders	L 14–22	9–7	McMahon Stadium	26,868

== Playoffs ==
=== West Semi-Final ===
Team	Q1	Q2	Q3	Q4	Total
Winnipeg Blue Bombers	0	4	0	0	4
Calgary Stampeders	10	7	7	14	38
