= 1978 Hamilton Tiger-Cats season =

Season of Canadian Football League team the Hamilton Tiger-Cats

- Head coach: Tom Dimitroff, Sr. and John Payne
- Home stadium: Ivor Wynne Stadium

Results
- Record: 5–10–1
- Division place: 3rd, East
- Playoffs: Lost Eastern Semi-Final
- Team MOP: Ray Nettles
- Team MOC: Neil Lumsden
- Team MOR: Ben Zambiasi

The 1978 Hamilton Tiger-Cats season was the 21st season for the team in the Canadian Football League (CFL) and their 29th overall. The Tiger-Cats finished in third place in the Eastern Conference with a 5–10–1 record, but lost the Eastern Semi-Final to the Montreal Alouettes.

In February 1978, the club was purchased by President and majority shareholder of Maple Leaf Gardens Limited, Harold Ballard. Mr. Ballard became the team president that year and would keep the strong tradition of pro football in that City. Rocky DiPietro was in his rookie season with the Ti-Cats. Ed George spent four seasons in the NFL before returning to the CFL in 1978 with the Hamilton Tiger-Cats. Through two seasons with the Tiger-Cats he played 34 games. Quarterback Jimmy Jones was in his final season with the Tiger-Cats and he finished his Tiger-Cats career with 861 career pass attempts, which was good enough to rank in the top ten.

== Regular season ==
=== Season standings ===
Eastern Football Conference
| Team | GP | W | L | T | PF | PA | Pts |
|---|---|---|---|---|---|---|---|
| Ottawa Rough Riders | 16 | 11 | 5 | 0 | 395 | 261 | 22 |
| Montreal Alouettes | 16 | 8 | 7 | 1 | 331 | 295 | 17 |
| Hamilton Tiger-Cats | 16 | 5 | 10 | 1 | 225 | 403 | 11 |
| Toronto Argonauts | 16 | 4 | 12 | 0 | 234 | 389 | 8 |

=== Season schedule ===
| Week | Game | Date | Opponent | Results | | Venue | Attendance |
| Week | Game | Date | Opponent | Score | Record | Venue | Attendance |
|---|---|---|---|---|---|---|---|
| 1 | 1 | July 12 | at Toronto Argonauts | L 22–34 | 0–1 | | |
| 2 | 2 | July 19 | vs. Saskatchewan Roughriders | W 27–23 | 1–1 | | |
| 3 | 3 | July 25 | at Montreal Alouettes | L 12–24 | 1–2 | | |
| 4 | 4 | Aug 1 | at BC Lions | T 22–22 | 1–2–1 | | |
| 5 | 5 | Aug 9 | vs. Winnipeg Blue Bombers | L 7–29 | 1–3–1 | | |
| 6 | 6 | Aug 15 | at Ottawa Rough Riders | L 6–32 | 1–4–1 | | |
| 7 | 7 | Aug 23 | vs. Ottawa Rough Riders | L 8–36 | 1–5–1 | | |
| 8 | 8 | Sept 4 | vs. Toronto Argonauts | W 19–16 | 2–5–1 | | |
| 9 | 9 | Sept 10 | at Edmonton Eskimos | L 16–56 | 2–6–1 | | |
| 10 | 10 | Sept 17 | at Montreal Alouettes | L 4–14 | 2–7–1 | | |
| 11 | 11 | Sept 23 | vs. Montreal Alouettes | W 17–6 | 3–7–1 | | |
| 12 | Bye | | | | | | |
| 13 | 14 | Oct 9 | vs. Ottawa Rough Riders | W 25–5 | 4–7–1 | | |
| 14 | 15 | Oct 14 | at Toronto Argonauts | L 7–21 | 4–8–1 | | |
| 15 | 14 | Oct 22 | vs. Calgary Stampeders | L 1–35 | 4–9–1 | | |
| 16 | 15 | Oct 28 | at Ottawa Rough Riders | L 9–34 | 4–10–1 | | |
| 17 | 16 | Nov 5 | vs. Toronto Argonauts | W 23–16 | 5–10–1 | | |

== Post-season ==
| Round | Date | Opponent | Results | | Venue | Attendance |
| Round | Date | Opponent | Score | Record | Venue | Attendance |
|---|---|---|---|---|---|---|
| Eastern Semi-Final | Nov 11 | at Montreal Alouettes | L 20–35 | 0–1 | | |

== Awards and honours ==
- Ben Zambiasi, Linebacker, CFL All-Stars Defense

== Roster ==
1978 Hamilton Tiger-Cats final roster
| Quarterbacks: 11 Roy Henry; 10 Jimmy Jones; Running backs: 20 Jimmy Edwards; 21 Dave Hadden; 36 Bill Harrison; 32 Neil Lumsden K/P; Wide receivers: 19 Brock Aynsley; 71 Leif Pettersen; 24 Dave Quehl; 70 Kerry Smith; Tight ends: 23 Rocky Dipietro; 77 Lawrie Skolrood | Offensive linemen: 55 Danny Bass G; 68 Larry Butler G; 54 Bart Evans G; 56 Alan Moffat T; 59 Frank Moffatt T; 50 Henry Waszczuk C; 67 Mike Wilson T; Defensive linemen: 79 Clifton Alapa DT; 63 Marv Allemang DT; 51 Granville Liggins DT; 64 Gary Robinson DE; 69 George Wells DE; Special teams: 3 Nick Jambrosic K | Linebackers: 41 Jack Blair; 42 John Martini; 57 Ray Nettles; 78 Bill Palmer P; 47 Ben Zambiasi; Defensive backs: 28 Steve Ackroyd; 29 Don Bowman; 14 Randy Graham; 34 Zac Henderson P; 24 Bill Knox; 17 Ron Meeks; 37 David Shaw; Injured list: 60 Glenn Robinson DE; 9 Ike Thomas DB; Italics indicate American players |
