= Jack Kennedy (coach) =

Canadian sports coach (1921–1999)

Biographical details
- Born: August 13, 1921; Toronto, Ontario, Canada
- Died: February 20, 1999 (aged 77); Hamilton, Ontario, Canada

Coaching career (HC unless noted)

Football
- 1950: Toronto (assistant)
- 1952–1954: Toronto (assistant)
- 1956–1961: Toronto (assistant)
- 1962–1964: Loyola College
- 1966–1968: McMaster
- 1972: McMaster

Ice hockey
- 1953–1962: Toronto (men's)
- 1962–1965: Loyola College (men's)
- 1976–1983: McMaster (women's)

John Robinson Kennedy (August 13, 1921 – February 20, 1999) was a Canadian football and ice hockey coach who was head coach of the Toronto Varsity Blues men's ice hockey team from 1953 to 1962, McMaster Marauders football team from 1966 to 1968 and in 1972, and the McMaster Lady Macs ice hockey team from 1975 to 1983.

== Early life ==
Kennedy was born in Toronto to two Vaudeville performers. During World War II, he was a navigator in the Royal Air Force. After leaving the military, he used his veteran benefits to attend the University of Toronto, where he played football.

== Coaching ==
After graduating, Kennedy joined the University of Toronto faculty. He was an assistant football coach during the 1950, 1952–1954, and 1956–1961 seasons. In 1953, he replaced Bill Wade as Toronto's hockey coach. His teams won six Queen's Cups in his nine years. His players included National Hockey League player Eric Nesterenko, NHL coaches Harry Neale and Tom Watt, and Premier of Ontario Bill Davis. He left the university in 1962 to become the director of athletics and head football and men's ice hockey coach at Loyola College in Montreal. He led Loyola's football team to its first-ever league championship.

In 1965, Kennedy was recruited to McMaster University by Ivor Wynne. His 1967 football team went 11–0, won the Atlantic Bowl, and played in that year's Vanier Cup national championship game. McMaster was losing to Alberta 10–9, but were within field goal range with 35 seconds left. Rather than playing it safe and running the ball, quarterback Dick Waring chose to pass the ball, resulting in an interception and handing the game to Alberta. In 1969, Kennedy became McMaster's athletic director and was succeeded as coach by his assistant, Ray Johnson. He returned for one season (1972) while Johnson was on sabbatical. His overall record was 21–14.

In 1976, Kennedy returned to coaching with the Lady Macs hockey team. His team won the 1978 Ontario Women's Intercollegiate Athletics Association and North American championship. One of his players, Susan Scherer, was a member of the Canada women's national ice hockey team that won the first-ever first-ever IIHF Women's World Championship in 1990.

== Later life ==
Kennedy retired from coaching in 1983, but remained with the university as an associate professor of physical education. He was inducted into the McMaster athletics hall of fame in 1994. He died on February 20, 1999 of pneumonia at the McMaster University Medical Centre.
