= 1978 Edmonton Eskimos season =

Canadian football team season

- General manager: Norm Kimball
- Head coach: Hugh Campbell
- Home stadium: Clarke Stadium; Commonwealth Stadium

Results
- Record: 10–4–2
- Division place: 1st, West
- Playoffs: Won Grey Cup

Uniform

The 1978 Edmonton Eskimos finished in first place in the Western Conference with a 10–4–2 record and won the 66th Grey Cup. It was Warren Moon's rookie season, and he replaced the injured Bruce Lemmerman as the backup quarterback and completed 89 of 173 passes for 1,112 yards and five touchdowns. He was Edmonton's nominee for the CFL's Most Outstanding Rookie Award.

== Pre-season ==
=== Schedule ===
Game	Date	Opponent	Results		Venue	Attendance
Game	Date	Opponent	Score	Record	Venue	Attendance
A	June 13	at Calgary Stampeders	L 19–25	0–1		22,155
A	June 17	vs. Toronto Argonauts	W 16–14	1–1		25,007
B	June 24	at Hamilton Tiger-Cats	L 8–18	1–2		20,056
D	July 5	BC Lions	W 46–1	2–2		24,931

== Regular season ==
=== Season standings ===
Western Football Conference
Team	GP	W	L	T	PF	PA	Pts
Edmonton Eskimos	16	10	4	2	452	301	22
Calgary Stampeders	16	9	4	3	381	311	21
Winnipeg Blue Bombers	16	9	7	0	371	351	18
BC Lions	16	7	7	2	359	308	16
Saskatchewan Roughriders	16	4	11	1	330	459	9

=== Season schedule ===
- The Eskimos played their first two regular season games at Clarke Stadium and their remaining six at Commonwealth Stadium.

Week	Game	Date	Opponent	Results		Venue	Attendance
Week	Game	Date	Opponent	Score	Record	Venue	Attendance
1	1	July 13	vs. Calgary Stampeders	W 33–17	1–0		25,277
2	2	July 18	at Winnipeg Blue Bombers	W 29–28	2–0		25,973
3	3	July 26	at Saskatchewan Roughriders	W 46–11	3–0		19,587
4	4	Aug 1	vs. Ottawa Rough Riders	L 23–24	3–1		16,185
5	Bye						
6	5	Aug 16	at Toronto Argonauts	W 40–3	4–1		49,168
7	6	Aug 23	vs. Winnipeg Blue Bombers	W 14–8	5–1		24,962
8	7	Aug 30	vs. BC Lions	W 18–10	6–1		42,768
8	8	Sept 4	at Calgary Stampeders	T 28–28	6–1–1		26,888
9	9	Sept 10	vs. Hamilton Tiger-Cats	W 56–16	7–1–1		26,282
10	10	Sept 17	at Saskatchewan Roughriders	W 25–20	8–1–1		21,149
11	11	Sept 24	vs. Calgary Stampeders	T 20–20	8–1–2		42,778
12	12	Oct 1	at Montreal Alouettes	W 42–22	9–1–2		54,652
13	13	Oct 9	vs. BC Lions	L 3–15	9–2–2		42,673
14	14	Oct 15	at Winnipeg Blue Bombers	W 38–10	10–2–2		28,080
15	Bye						
16	15	Oct 29	vs. Saskatchewan Roughriders	L 26–36	10–3–2		42,000
17	16	Nov 4	at BC Lions	L 11–33	10–4–2		20,822

Total attendance: 262,925
Average attendance: 32,866 (76.8%)

== Playoffs ==
Round	Date	Opponent	Results		Venue	Attendance
Round	Date	Opponent	Score	Record	Venue	Attendance
Division Final	Nov 18	vs. Calgary Stampeders	W 26–13	1–0		42,673*
Grey Cup	Nov 26	vs. Montreal Alouettes	W 20–13	2–0		54,386

*Top playoff attendance of season

== Roster ==
1978 Edmonton Eskimos final roster
Quarterbacks: 10 Bruce Lemmerman; 1 Warren Moon; 12 Tom Wilkinson; Running backs: 25 Jim Germany; 31 Pat McNeil; 23 Angelo Santucci; 21 Don Warrington; 32 Larry Washington; Wide receivers: 77 Brian Fryer; 72 John Konihowski; 15 Stu Lang; 76 George McGowan; 22 Tom Scott; Tight ends: 71 Waddell Smith	Offensive linemen: 53 Bob Howes C; 50 Willie Martin T; 56 Ted Milian C; 63 Hector Pothier T/G; 62 Bill Stevenson G; 60 Charlie Turner T; 57 Eric Upton G; Defensive linemen: 64 David Boone DE; 55 Ron Estay DE; 65 Dave Fennell DT; 69 York Hentschel DT; 68 Joey Jackson DE; Special teams: 26 Dave Cutler K; 8 Hank Ilesic P	Linebackers: 34 Ian Bryans; 42 Danny Kepley; 30 Dale Potter; 20 Tom Towns; Defensive backs: 28 Gregg Butler; 18 John Farlinger; 13 Larry Highbaugh; 29 Joe Hollimon; 24 Ed Jones; 7 Pete Lavorato; Injured list: 70 Brian Kelly WR; Italics indicate American player.

== Grey Cup ==
Teams	1 Q	2 Q	3 Q	4 Q	Final
Edmonton Eskimos	10	4	3	3	20
Montreal Alouettes	3	0	7	3	13

== Awards and honours ==
- CFL's Most Outstanding Defensive Player Award – Dave "Dr. Death" Fennell (DT)
- Grey Cup Most Valuable Player (Offence) – Tom Wilkinson
- Grey Cup Most Valuable Player (Defence) – Dave "Dr. Death" Fennell
- Dave "Dr. Death" Fennell, Defensive Tackle, CFL All-Star
- Danny Kepley, Linebacker, CFL All-Star
