= Commonwealth Stadium =

Multiuse stadium in Edmonton, Alberta, Canada

- Commonwealth Stadium in November 2026.

- Location in Edmonton Location in Alberta Location in Canada
- Location: 11000 Stadium Road; Edmonton, Alberta, Canada
- Coordinates: 53°33′30″N 113°28′30″W
- Owner: City of Edmonton
- Capacity: 42,500 (1978–1979); 43,346 (1980–1981); 59,912 (1982); 60,081 (1983–2007); 59,537 (2008–2012); 56,302 (2012–present); 31,000 (lower bowl)
- Surface: Grass (1978–2009); FieldTurf Duraspine Pro (2010–present)
- Record attendance: 66,835 (U2 360° Tour)
- Public transit: Stadium station

Construction
- Opened: July 15, 1978
- Renovated: 2001, 2008
- Expanded: 1982, 2013
- Cost: C$20.9 million ($93.8 million in 2025 dollars) Expansion: 1982: CA$11 million ($32.9 million in 2025 dollars); 2013: CA$12 million ($16 million in 2025 dollars) Renovations: 2001: $24 million ($40.3 million in 2025 dollars); 2008: CA$112 million ($161 million in 2025 dollars) Total cost: $296.8 million in 2021 dollars
- Architects: Bell, McCulloch, Spotowski and Associates

Tenants
- Edmonton Eskimos/Elks (CFL) (1978–present); Edmonton Drillers (NASL) (1979–1981); FC Edmonton (CC) (2011–2013); Canada men's national soccer team (select matches)

Commonwealth Stadium is an open-air, multi-purpose stadium located in the McCauley neighbourhood of Edmonton, Alberta, Canada. It has a seating capacity of 56,302, making it the largest stadium in Canada. Primarily used as the home field of the Edmonton Elks of the Canadian Football League, the stadium also hosts athletics, soccer, rugby union and concerts.

Construction commenced in 1975 and the venue opened ahead of the 1978 Commonwealth Games, hence its name. The stadium replaced the adjacent Clarke Stadium as the home of the Elks, then known as the Eskimos, that same year. It received a major expansion ahead of the 1983 Summer Universiade, when it reached a capacity of 60,081. Commonwealth Stadium has hosted five Grey Cups, the CFL's championship game.

Soccer tournaments include nine FIFA World Cup qualification matches with the Canadian men's national soccer team, two versions of the invitational Canada Cup, the 1996 CONCACAF Men's Pre-Olympic Tournament, the 2002 FIFA U-19 Women's World Championship and the 2007 FIFA U-20 World Cup, the 2014 FIFA U-20 Women's World Cup and the 2015 FIFA Women's World Cup. FC Edmonton played its Canadian Championship matches at Commonwealth Stadium from 2011 to 2013.

Other events at the stadium include the 2001 World Championships in Athletics, the 2006 Women's Rugby World Cup and three editions of the Churchill Cup.

== History ==
Prior to Commonwealth Stadium, the main stadium in Edmonton was Clarke Stadium, which opened in 1939 and was built on a 15-hectare (38-acre) plot of land. Work on applying to host the 1978 Commonwealth Games started in the early 1970s. With both federal, provincial and city funding backing the bid, it called for a massive renovation of the city's various sporting venues. The original plans called for Clarke Stadium to be rebuilt and expanded to host the athletics events. By 1974 there was consensus that Clarke Stadium would not be sufficient and that an all-new stadium should be built. Several locations and sizes were discussed, with Edmonton City Council in January 1975 landing on building a 40,000-seat venue next to Clarke Stadium. The venue was designed by Ragan, Bell, McManus Consultants. The city also decided to build additional new venues: Kinsmen Aquatic Centre and Argyll Velodrome. They based their design on Jack Trice Stadium in the US city of Ames, Iowa.

Part of the public support for the stadium came from it being built to also support being used by the Eskimos. The plans were met with opposition from local residents. There were also discussions regarding the necessity of a $50,000 royal retirement room and the allocation of training and office space to the Eskimos. The largest discussion was related to whether the stadium needed a roof or dome. As the roof would cost $18.2 million, there was limited public support, and the stadium was built without one. In an attempt to further the roof process, the Eskimos offered to pay $1.6 million towards the roof. The Commonwealth Games did not permit an enclosed stadium, so the design would have to call for the roof to be added afterwards. Among the opponents of the roof was Commonwealth Games Foundation President Maury Van Vliet, who said experience from construction of the Olympic Stadium in Montreal showed the necessity of building a simple structure. An alternative design, which would have cost an additional $7.3 million, was launched by the Eskimos in August 1975, but rejected by the city council. A major concern for the city council was the large cost overruns being experienced in Montreal at the time.

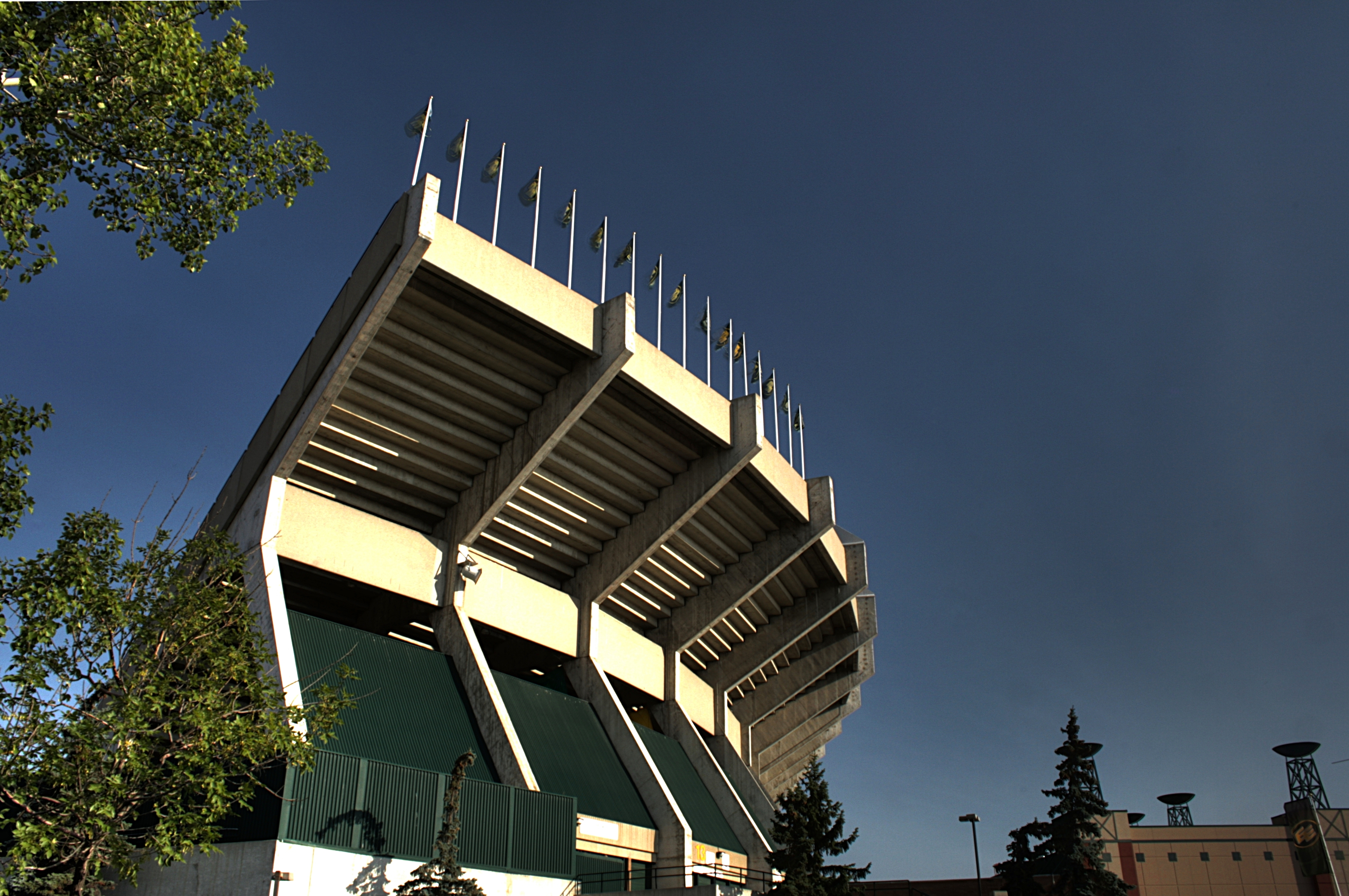
Upper tiers

Excavation started in December 1974 and saw the removal of 380,000 cubic metres (500,000 yd^{3}) of earthwork. A local action committee, Action Edmonton, demanded in early 1975 that construction be halted and the venue relocated. The city estimated that this would cost an additional $2.5 million and delay the process with eight months. The decision to not enclose the stadium was taken on December 10, 1975. The venue was thus not designed to allow a roof, air-filled or stiff, to be retrofitted. The venue was built on the former site of the Rat Creek Dump and the Williamson Slaughter House. During excavation, remains from the dump were struck, resulting in archaeological surveys being carried out. Construction of the Edmonton LRT's inaugural line (later named the Capital Line) commenced in 1974 and was opened in time for the Commonwealth Games, which allowed spectators to take the LRT from Stadium station to downtown Edmonton.

Construction of the stadium was completed within budget and time. When the venue opened it had a capacity for 42,500 and a natural grass turf. Unlike most other major stadiums in Canada, Commonwealth Stadium elected for a natural grass turf. The original configuration included 39,384 bucket seats and 3,200 bench seating on the north end. The venue was officially opened on July 15, 1978, in an event which attracted 15,000 spectators. The venue went through a slight expansion in 1980, when the seating capacity was increased to 43,346. Additional proposals for a roof, ranging from $10 to $32 million in cost, were presented in 1979, but since then the discussion of covering the stadium died out.

Edmonton was selected to host the 1983 Summer Universiade, and in 1981 the city council approved an $11 million upgrade to the venue, which added a further 18,000 seats to the upper tiers and the north end zone; this gave a capacity of 59,912 in 1982 and 60,081 from 1983. For special events, such as the Grey Cup, additional seating could be added. This made it the second-largest stadium in Canada, after Montreal's Olympic Stadium, and the largest without a dome. After Winnipeg Stadium, home of the Winnipeg Blue Bombers, installed AstroTurf on their field for the 1988 CFL season, the stadium was the last in the CFL to have a natural grass surface (a few teams from the CFL's American expansion in the 1990s notwithstanding); it would have this distinction for the next 21 years.

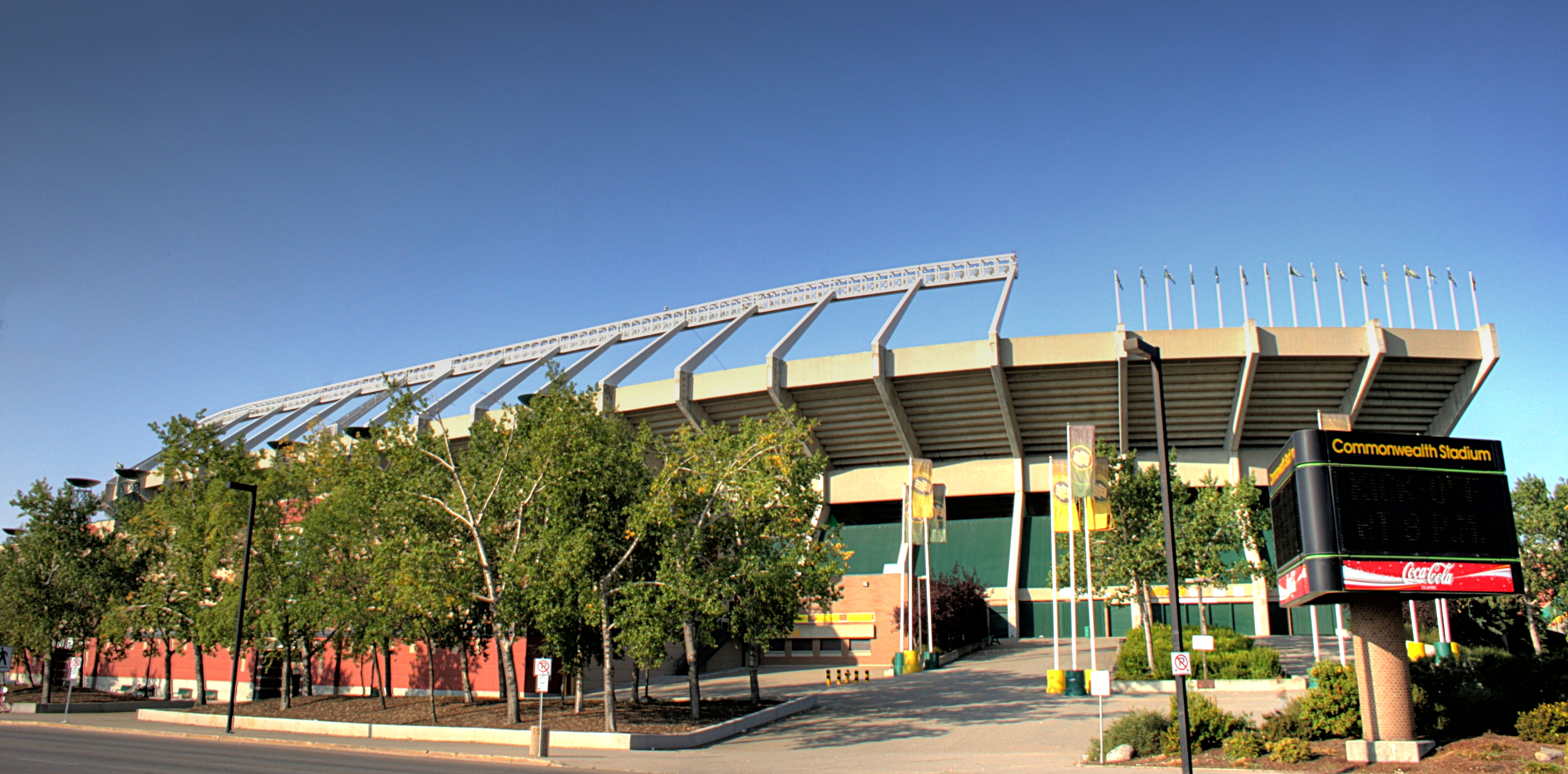
Façade

Ahead of the 2001 World Championships in Athletics, the stadium received a $24-million facelift. Major investments included a new façade, an enlargement of the concourse, improved lighting, a new scoreboard and an all-new all-weather running track. Ahead of the 2008 season the stadium underwent a reconfiguration, reducing its capacity to 59,537. For the nine seasons prior to 2010, the natural turf was replaced eight times, costing $50,000 each time. The natural grass turf was replaced with FieldTurf Duraspine Pro in May 2010, making the Eskimos the last CFL team to switch to artificial turf (and made all fields in the CFL having artificial turf; this would last for six seasons), and the last team to play on grass until the Toronto Argonauts began playing at BMO Field for the 2016 season. The investment cost $2.6 million and was split evenly between the city and the Eskimos. The work included the removal of 12,400 cubic metres (440,000 cu ft) of soil, and the turf has a life expectancy of 8 to 10 years. It will cost $500,000 to replace. The reasons for the replacement were to reduce injuries, reduce the need for watering and fertilizer, allow a green turf for the entire season, including at Grey Cups (when the weather is especially cold in Edmonton), allow the venue to host more events, as concerts and the like will not damage the field, and that turf is recycled and recyclable.

Commonwealth Stadium underwent a $112-million facelift starting in 2009. The main investment was a field house, new locker rooms, a hosting area and two floors of office space. The complex, named the Commonwealth Community Recreation Centre and designed by MacLennan Jaunkalns Miller Architects and HIP Architects, also has an aquatic centre and a fitness centre. The complex was completed in February 2012.

Following the 2010 Grey Cup, the program to replace the seating at the stadium commenced. All seating (which had been in place since the stadium's opening) was replaced with new and wider seats, and the color changed from red and orange to green and yellow—the Eskimos' colors. Approval of the $12 million upgrade was made by the city council on May 18, 2011, and it took 11 months to select a supplier, with installation starting in June 2012. The upgrade removed all bench seating, which had been in place in the corners and end zones, resulting in an all-seater stadium. Because of wider seats, 53 centimetres (21 in) wide instead of 48 centimetres (19 in), capacity for the venue as reduced to 56,302. The process reduced the number of seats in each row by one. With the seating installed, the total investment in the venue exceeded $200 million. Before the start of the 2014 CFL season, the track surface was stripped off, thus giving the football end zones a squared-off look; they were rounded off prior to this.

On June 15, 2016, the Edmonton Eskimos announced a five-year field naming rights partnership with The Brick to name the field "The Brick Field at Commonwealth Stadium" during CFL events. A naming rights deal with Play Alberta was signed in 2025, and the field renamed to "Play Alberta Field at Commonwealth Stadium".

The Edmonton Elks will not sell upper bowl tickets at Commonwealth Stadium for the 2024 CFL season, reducing the stadium's capacity to 31,000 seats.

== Facilities ==
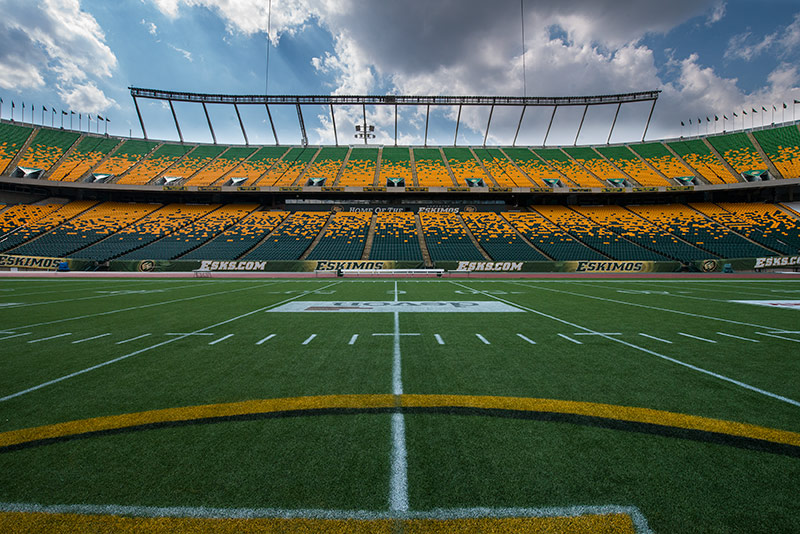
Commonwealth Stadium Field Level

Commonwealth Stadium has a seating capacity of 56,302, in an all-seater configuration. The stadium has two twin-tier grandstands along each side, and single-tier stands on the corners and ends. The sides feature 44,032 seats, with the remaining 12,386 in the corners and ends. The side seats are 53 centimetres (21 in) wide and have a cup holder, a feature lacking on the narrower end zone seats. The seating is laid out in a colorized mosaic pattern, with dark green at the bottom, yellow in the middle and lighter green at the top. In the sides there are 14,203 dark green seats, 19,019 yellow seats and 10,810 light green seats. In the corner and end zones there are 8,672 dark green and 3,713 yellow seats. There are 15 executive suites on the east stand, 7 on the west stand and 8 on the south end zone. There is a limited amount of covered seating on the upper sections of the lower tier on the sides; half of this section on the east stand is a media centre.

The stadium has a Shaw Sports Turf Powerblade Elite 2.5S artificial turf system, installed in 2016 by GTR turf, which covers an area of 10,215 square metres (109,950 sq ft). It contains additional cushioning through the installation of an extra shock pad. The turf lacks permanent line markings; this allows the markings to alternate between football and soccer. Because of the running track, the corners of the end zones were partially cut. In 2014, the end zones were squared off. The track and field segment consists of a Sportflex Super X all-weather running track manufactured by Mondo of Italy. The International Association of Athletics Federations has certified the stadium as a Class 1 venue, a certification only two other stadiums have in Canada: Moncton Stadium and Université de Sherbrooke Stadium.

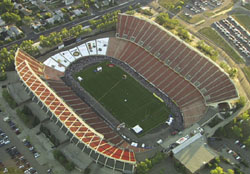
The stadium prior to its 2013 renovations.

At Commonwealth Stadium complex is the Field House, an 8,400-square-metre (90,000 ft^{2}) three-storey training facility which includes a running track, a 64-by-64-metre (70 by 70 yd) artificial turf training field, a fitness and weight room, locker rooms and a running track. It is part of the Commonwealth Community Recreation Centre, which also includes a 5,600-square-metre (60,000 ft^{2}) aquatics centre with a four-lane lap pool, a water slide and a recreational pool; 2,800 square metres (30,000 ft^{2}) of administrative offices; a 2,800-square-metre (30,000 ft^{2}) fitness centre, and the Edmonton Elks' team store. The building features a central lobby with each of the facilities in an annex. The centre has Leadership in Energy and Environmental Design (LEED) Silver certification. Adjacent to Commonwealth Stadium lies Clarke Stadium; it seats 5,000 and is used as a training field and as the home ground of the Canadian Premier League side FC Edmonton until it was dissolved in 2022.

The stadium is served by Stadium station of the Edmonton Light Rail Transit Capital Line. During Elks games, the service frequency is increased. The City of Edmonton and the Elks cooperate on the Green & Go program, which provides free transit rides to the venue from six park and ride lots throughout Edmonton. Any holder of a pre-purchased game ticket can travel free on the buses from these lots to Commonwealth Stadium. The program was initiated by the city to minimize parking and congestion in the stadium's neighbourhood. Game tickets are also valid fare on the LRT service from two hours prior to games to two hours after games. The city bans on-street parking in the vicinity of the stadium during games, excepting cars with residential permits.

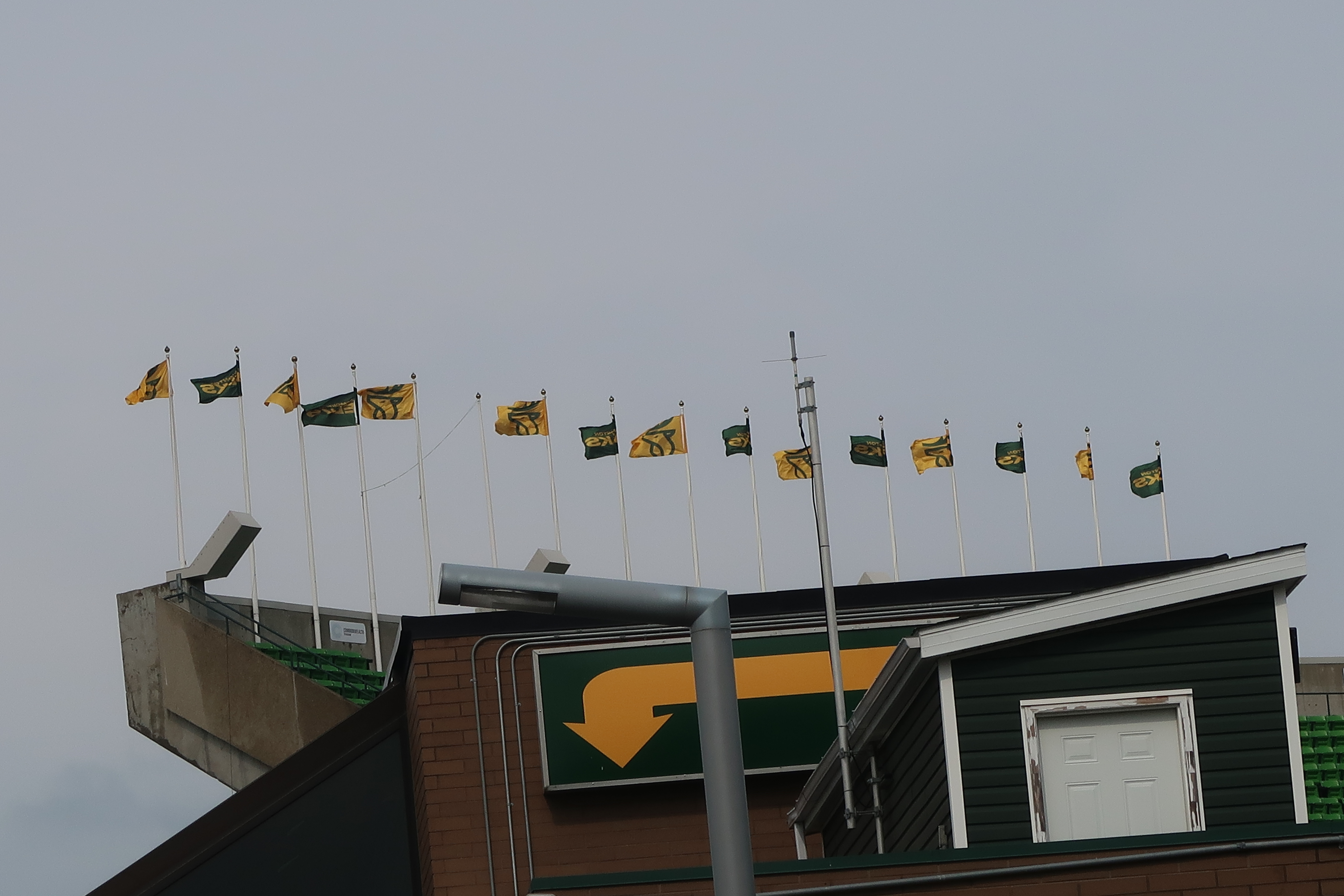
Elks flags

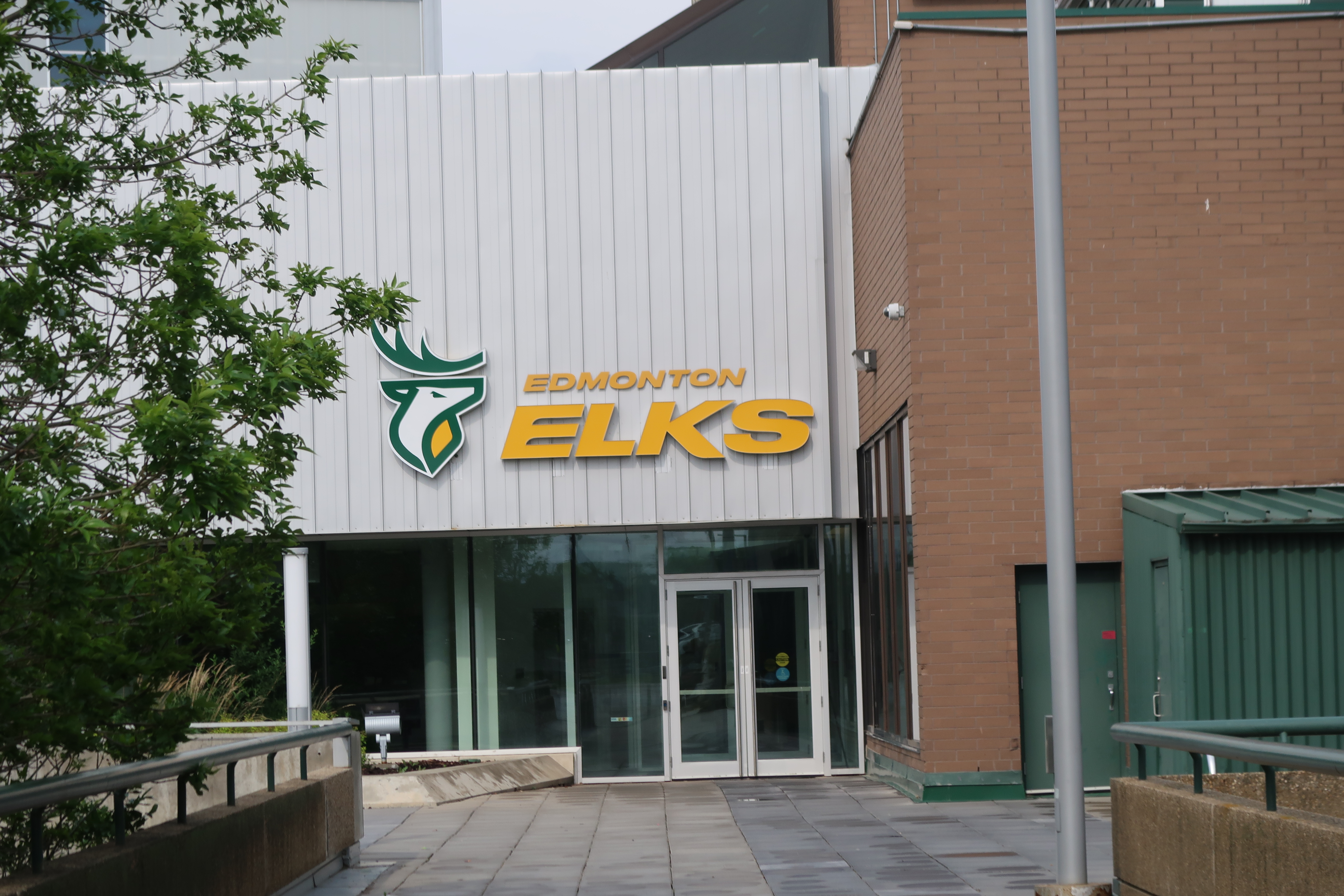
Side entrance

== Events ==
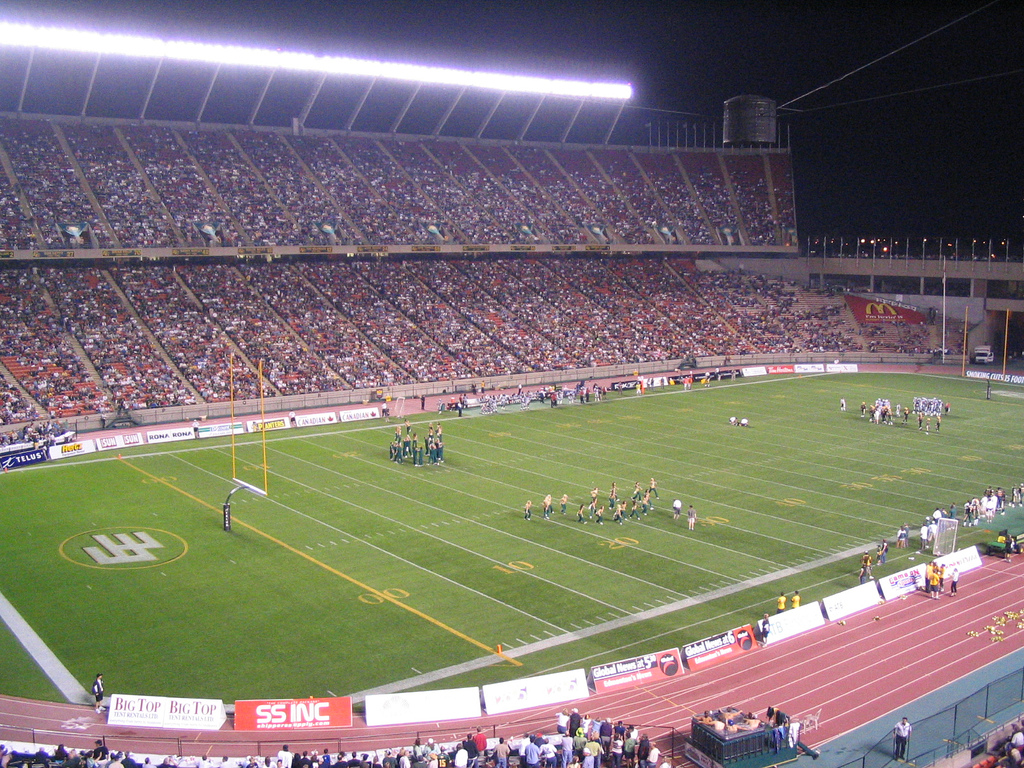
The Eskimos playing the Montreal Alouettes on August 26, 2005 (image during TV commercial break)

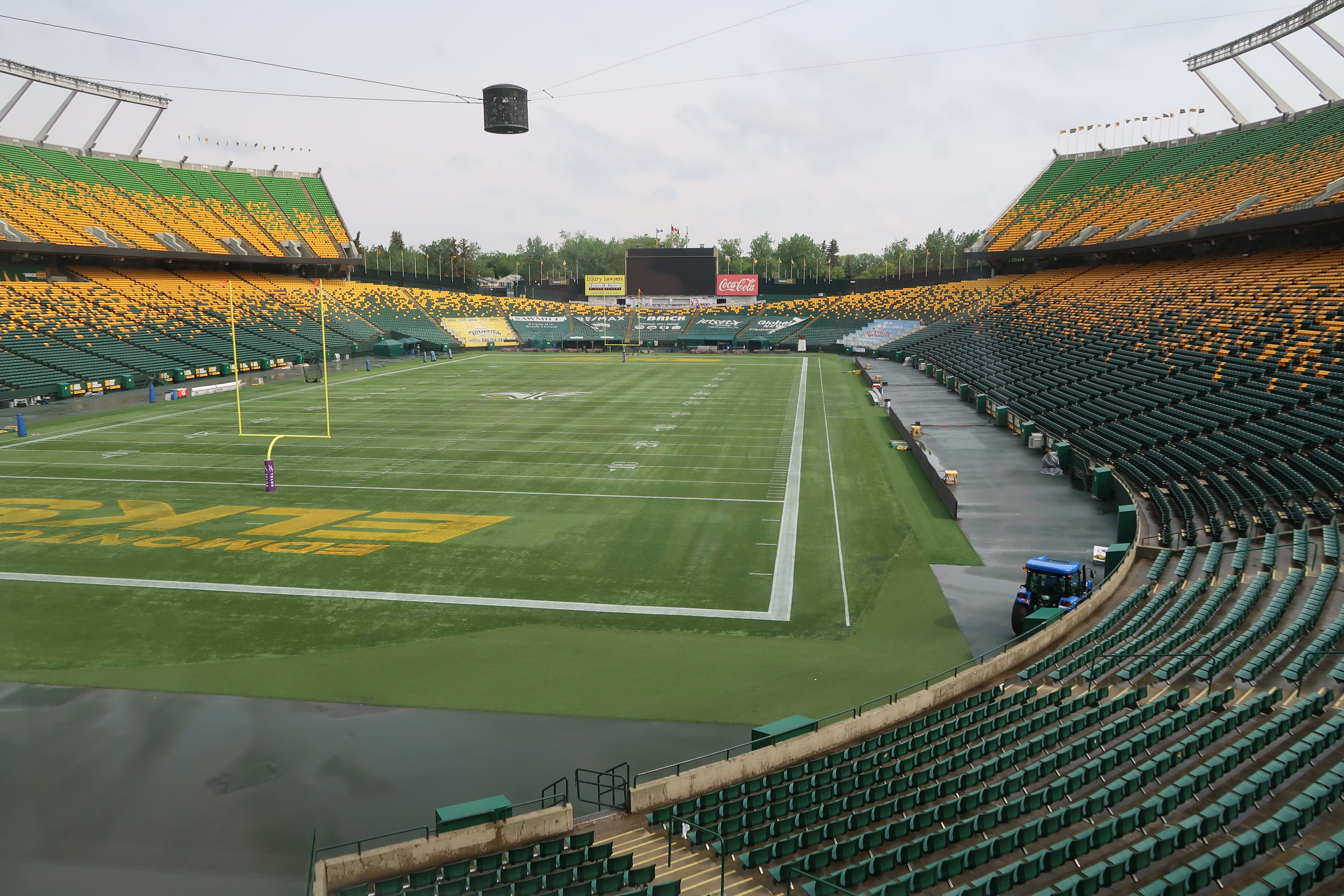
The view from the side of the stadium

=== Athletics ===
Commonwealth Stadium was the centrepiece of the 1978 Commonwealth Games, which were hosted from August 3 to 12. The games saw 1,474 athletes from 46 nations competed in 128 events. Canada conducted its all-time best performance, capturing 45 gold medals and 109 medals in total. Commonwealth Stadium hosted the athletics events, which consisted of 38 events: 23 for male and 15 for female competitors, as well as the opening and closing ceremonies.

The success and popularity of the Commonwealth Games resulted in Edmonton bidding for and being selected to host the 1983 Summer Universiade. Commonwealth Stadium was again selected to host the athletics events, in addition to the opening and closing ceremonies. 24 male and 17 female athletics events were hosted. The games saw 2,400 participants from 73 countries, but did not attract the same public attention as the Commonwealth Games had.

The 2001 World Championships in Athletics were held at Commonwealth Stadium between August 3 and 12, featuring 1677 participants from 189 nations.

=== Canadian football ===
Commonwealth Stadium has been the home of the Canadian Football League's Edmonton Eskimos/Elks since the 1978 season. In the 1977 season, the last whole season at Clarke, the Eskimos drew an average 25,324 spectators, filling up the venue to its capacity for seven of eight games. For the 1979 season, they drew an average 42,540 spectators, selling out seven of eight games. The all-time regular-season attendance record is 62,517, set against the Saskatchewan Roughriders on September 26, 2009. 28 regular-season Edmonton Elks games have sold out at Commonwealth. With the laying of artificial turf in 2010, the team stopped training on Clarke Stadium and have since used Commonwealth Stadium as their training ground.

Eskimos/Elks average season attendance
Season	Capacity	Average	High	Sellouts	Ref(s)
1978	42,500	42,609	42,778	6	
1979	42,500	42,540	43,321	7	
1980	43,346	42,081	43,460	3	
1981	43,346	44,894	48,472	8	
1982	59,912	57,901	59,979	1	
1983	60,081	50,021	53,577	0	
1984	60,081	40,977	47,015	0	
1985	60,081	42,031	48,193	0	
1986	60,081	40,097	40,097	0	
1987	60,081	33,581	40,486	0	
1988	60,081	30,746	35,383	0	
1989	60,081	30,815	41,327	0	
1990	60,081	35,758	57,444	0	
1991	60,081	33,265	57,843	0	
1992	60,081	28,708	48,793	0	
1993	60,081	30,517	54,324	0	
1994	60,081	29,867	51,180	0	
1995	60,081	31,474	49,434	0	
1996	60,081	29,817	40,727	0	
1997	60,081	31,894	43,913	0	

Eskimos/Elks average season attendance
Season	Capacity	Average	High	Sellouts	Ref(s)
1998	60,081	31,956	50,856	0	
1999	60,081	34,240	52,458	0	
2000	60,081	33,912	53,248	0	
2001	60,081	35,508	48,279	0	
2002	60,081	38,160	61,481	1	
2003	60,081	41,228	62,444	1	
2004	60,081	39,031	50,366	0	
2005	60,081	41,933	53,216	0	
2006	60,081	36,758	47,965	0	
2007	60,081	36,843	46,704	0	
2008	59,537	37,383	48,808	0	
2009	59,537	37,164	62,517	1	
2010	59,537	34,913	47,829	0	
2011	59,537	34,625	45,672	0	
2012	59,537	34,318	43,178	0	
2013	56,302	32,096	41,868	0	
2014	56,302	33,485	42,161	0	
2015	56,302	31,517	38,906	0	
2016	56,302	30,998	37,168	0	
2017	56,302	32,435	41,738	0	

The stadium has been host to the Grey Cup, the CFL's championship game, five times, in 1984, 1997, 2002, 2010, and 2018. Tickets to the 2010 Grey Cup were sold out prior to the start of the season. The game was spectated by a crowd of 63,317, the largest to attend the stadium.

Grey Cups at Commonwealth Stadium
Game	Date	Winning team	Score	Losing team	Attendance
72nd	November 18, 1984	Winnipeg Blue Bombers (8)	47–17	Hamilton Tiger-Cats	60,081
85th	November 16, 1997	Toronto Argonauts (14)	47–23	Saskatchewan Roughriders	60,431
90th	November 24, 2002	Montreal Alouettes (5)	25–16	Edmonton Eskimos	62,531
98th	November 28, 2010	Montreal Alouettes (7)	21–18	Saskatchewan Roughriders	63,317
106th	November 25, 2018	Calgary Stampeders (8)	27–16	Ottawa Redblacks	55,819

=== Soccer ===
Edmonton Drillers

The Edmonton Drillers of the North American Soccer League, then the premier soccer league in Canada and the United States, was established in 1979 with the relocation of the Oakland Stompers. Bought by Peter Pocklington, the team chose to play its first three seasons at Commonwealth Stadium. The team played to home play-off matches during the 1980 season. The Drillers averaged between 9,923 and 10,920 in their first three seasons. After having lost $10.5 million in three years, Pocklington chose to relocate to Clarke Stadium for the 1982 season. This caused average attendance to plummet to 4,922 and the team was disbanded at the end of the year.

Drillers average season attendance
Season	Capacity	Average	Ref(s)
1979	42,500	9,923	
1980	43,346	10,920	
1981	43,346	10,632	

Canadian Soccer Association

In the past, because of its natural turf, Commonwealth Stadium has been a favored stadium for the Canadian Soccer Association to host national games. It has hosted 18 games of the Men's National Soccer Team and two of the Men's Under-20 National Team. The most intense period was between 1995 and 2000, when 13 A-team games were played. The A-team has played nine FIFA World Cup qualification and five friendly matches at Commonwealth. The record attendance of 51,936 was set when Canada tied Brazil 1–1 on June 5, 1994.

The Canadian Soccer Association twice invited to the Canada Cup, a three- or four-way invitational international friendly tournament, with all matches hosted at Commonwealth Stadium. The 1995 Canada Cup featured Canada, Northern Ireland and Chile, while the 1999 Canada Cup featured Canada U-23, Iran, Ecuador and Guatemala U-23.

On November 16, 2021, the stadium hosted a third-round match in the CONCACAF 2022 FIFA World Cup qualifiers between Canada and Mexico; with a 2–1 victory, Canada defeated Mexico for the first time in 21 years, taking the lead in the pool. Due to the frigid Prairie temperatures of November, Canada Soccer tweeted that the stadium was "Canada's frozen fortress", while fans also nicknamed the field "Estadio Iceteca" or "The Iceteca", in reference to Mexico's home field Estadio Azteca. With a temperature of −9 °C at kickoff, it was the coldest game in Mexico national team history.

Canada Men's National Soccer Team matches at Commonwealth Stadium
Dates	Tournament	Opponent	Score	Attendance
September 17, 1980	Friendly	New Zealand	3–0	1,751
June 16, 1983	Friendly	Scotland	0–3	10,240
July 25, 1984	Friendly	Chile	0–0	6,137
September 27, 1993	1994 FIFA World Cup qualification	Australia	2–1	27,775
June 5, 1994	Friendly	Brazil	1–1	51,936
May 22, 1995	1995 Canada Cup	Northern Ireland	2–0	12,112
May 28, 1995	1995 Canada Cup	Chile	1–2	17,047
August 30, 1996	1998 FIFA World Cup qualification	Panama	3–1	9,402
October 10, 1996	1998 FIFA World Cup qualification	Cuba	2–0	6,046
October 13, 1996	1998 FIFA World Cup qualification	Cuba	2–0	10,122
June 1, 1997	1998 FIFA World Cup qualification	Costa Rica	1–0	9,100
October 12, 1997	1998 FIFA World Cup qualification	Mexico	2–2	11,806
June 2, 1999	1999 Canada Cup	Guatemala	2–0	5,821
June 4, 1999	1999 Canada Cup	Iran	0–1	8,865
June 6, 1999	1999 Canada Cup	Ecuador	1–2	10,026
July 16, 2000	2002 FIFA World Cup qualification	Trinidad and Tobago	0–2	25,000
September 4, 2004	2006 FIFA World Cup qualification	Honduras	1–1	9,654
October 15, 2008	2010 FIFA World Cup qualification	Mexico	2–2	14,145
May 28, 2013	Friendly	Costa Rica	0–1	8,102
November 12, 2021	2022 FIFA World Cup qualification	Costa Rica	1–0	48,806
November 16, 2021	2022 FIFA World Cup qualification	Mexico	2–1	44,212
June 1, 2026	Friendly	Uzbekistan	2–0	46,164

Canada Women's National Soccer Team matches at Commonwealth Stadium
Date	Tournament	Opponent	Score	Attendance
May 28, 1995	Friendly	United States	1–2	—
August 31, 2003	Friendly	Mexico	8–0	29,953
September 4, 2005	Friendly	Germany	3–4	8,812
October 30, 2013	Friendly	South Korea	3–0	12,746
October 25, 2014	Friendly	Japan	0–3	9,654
June 6, 2015	2015 FIFA Women's World Cup	China	1–0	53,058
June 11, 2015	2015 FIFA Women's World Cup	New Zealand	0–0	35,544

Canada and Commonwealth Stadium were host to the 1996 edition of the CONCACAF Men's Olympic Qualifying Tournament, which featured the Men's Under-23 National Team between 10 and 19 May. The tournament drew crowds up to 19,401, and saw Canada finish second to Mexico. Canada played Australia, playing 2–2 at Commonwealth Stadium on 26 May. Canada lost 5–0 in Australia and fail to qualify.

Edmonton co-hosted the inaugural 2002 FIFA U-19 Women's World Championship between August 17 and September 1 along with Vancouver and Victoria. Edmonton was the base of operations and featured 12 of the 26 matches. FIFA was originally skeptical to using such a large venue, especially for those matches which did not involve Canada. The 12 games drew a total 238,090 and an average 19,841 spectators. The final, which saw the United States defeat Canada 1–0 in extra time, was spectated by 47,784; this remains a world-record attendance for youth-level women's soccer.

Commonwealth Stadium was one of six Canadian venues selected to host the 2007 FIFA U-20 World Cup between June 30 and July 22. Nine of 52 matches were played in Edmonton, including a quarterfinal and a semifinal, and two of Canada. The games drew a total attendance of 243,517 and an average attendance of 27,057, second only to the Olympic Stadium in Montreal. The highest attendance was 32,058, which watched Canada play Congo.

Two club friendly matches were played at Commonwealth in 2009 and 2010, under the Edmonton Cup umbrella. In the first, 15,800 spectators watched Argentinian side River Plate defeat England's Everton 1–0. In the second, 8,792 spectators watched FC Edmonton play English side Portsmouth to a 1–1 draw. A third club friendly was played in 2019 at Commonwealth Stadium between Cardiff City FC (English Football League) and Real Valladolid (La Liga Spain). Cardiff City fought out a 1–1 draw against the Spanish La Liga club, owned by Brazilian ace Ronaldo, before winning the penalty shoot-out 4–2. FC Edmonton started competing in the Canadian Championship in 2011 season and played these games at Commonwealth Stadium until 2014 when they returned to Clarke Stadium which is their regular home ground. Commonwealth Stadium also hosted matches during the 2014 FIFA U-20 Women's World Cup between August 5 and 24, and the 2015 FIFA Women's World Cup between June 5 and July 6.

2015 FIFA Women's World Cup
Date	Time (MDT)	Team #1	Result	Team #2	Round	Attendance
6 June 2015	16:00	Canada	1–0	China	Group A	53,058
6 June 2015	19:00	New Zealand	0–1	Netherlands	Group A	53,058
11 June 2015	16:00	China	1–0	Netherlands	Group A	35,544
11 June 2015	19:00	Canada	0–0	New Zealand	Group A	35,544
16 June 2015	15:00	Switzerland	1–2	Cameroon	Group C	10,177
16 June 2015	18:00	Australia	1–1	Sweden	Group D	10,177
20 June 2015	17:30	China	1–0	Cameroon	Round of 16	15,958
22 June 2015	18:00	United States	2–0	Colombia	Round of 16	19,412
27 June 2015	14:00	Australia	0–1	Japan	Quarterfinals	19,814
1 July 2015	17:00	Japan	2–1	England	Semifinals	31,467
4 July 2015	14:00	Germany	0–1	England	Third place play-off	21,483

=== Concerts ===
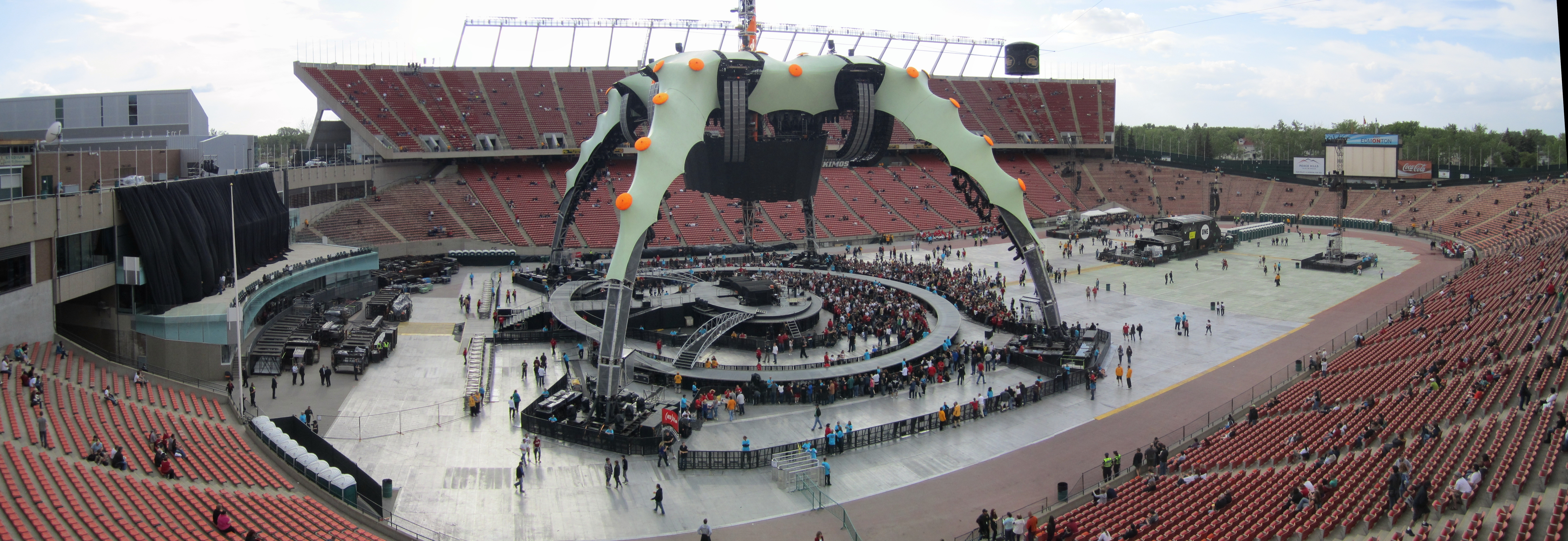
U2 during its U2 360° Tour on June 1, 2011, which drew a record attendance of 65,000.

Concerts held at Commonwealth Stadium include Pink Floyd, Beyoncé, David Bowie, Tim McGraw, Genesis, the Rolling Stones, the Police, Fiction Plane, AC/DC, Metallica, U2, Kenny Chesney, Bob Dylan, Willie Nelson, Taylor Swift, Bon Jovi, Guns N' Roses, Lilith Fair, Mötley Crüe, Edgefest and One Direction.

Date	Artist(s)	Opening act(s)	Tour	Tickets sold	Revenue	Additional notes
August 7, 1983	David Bowie	Peter Gabriel; The Tubes	Serious Moonlight Tour	—	—	
August 17, 1987	David Bowie	Duran Duran; The Georgia Satellites; The Northern Pikes	Glass Spider Tour	—	—	
June 12, 1992	Genesis	—	We Can't Dance Tour	—	—	
June 28, 1994	Pink Floyd	—	The Division Bell Tour	57,701 / 57,701	$1,834,004	
October 4, 1994	The Rolling Stones	Colin James	Voodoo Lounge Tour	121,604/ 121,604	$4,327,764	
October 5, 1994	The Rolling Stones	Colin James	Voodoo Lounge Tour	121,604/ 121,604	$4,327,764	
June 14, 1997	U2	Fun Lovin' Criminals	PopMart Tour	90,000 / 90,000	$3,493,456	
June 15, 1997	U2	Fun Lovin' Criminals	PopMart Tour	90,000 / 90,000	$3,493,456	
October 2, 1997	The Rolling Stones	Blues Traveler	Bridges to Babylon Tour	44,036 / 44,036	$2,033,971	
August 18, 1998	Backstreet Boys	Aaron Carter	Backstreet's Back Tour	—	—	
June 2, 2007	The Police	Sloan; Fiction Plane	The Police Reunion Tour	29,592 / 29,592	$3,216,118	
July 9, 2009	Taylor Swift; Kenny Chesney	Gloriana; Kelly Pickler; Lady Antebellum; Miranda Lambert	Fearless Tour; Sun City Carnival Tour	33,910 / 44,500	$2,540,906	This concert was part of Commonwealth Country.
August 26, 2009	AC/DC	The Answer	Black Ice World Tour	55,838 / 55,838	$4,764,061	
July 15, 2010	Bon Jovi	Kid Rock	The Circle Tour	40,451 / 40,451	$2,811,477	
June 1, 2011	U2	The Fray	U2 360° Tour	66,835 / 66,835	$6,498,291	
July 21, 2015	One Direction	Icona Pop	On the Road Again Tour	40,989 / 40,989	$3,188,215	
September 20, 2015	AC/DC	Vintage Trouble	Rock or Bust World Tour	55,000 / 55,000	—	
May 20, 2016	Beyoncé	—	The Formation World Tour	39,299 / 39,299	$3,723,830	This concert was performed in cold and rainy conditions.
August 16, 2017	Metallica	Avenged Sevenfold; Gojira	WorldWired Tour	—	—	
August 30, 2017	Guns N' Roses	Our Lady Peace	Not in This Lifetime... Tour	44,393 / 46,656	$4,780,270	The band covered "Wichita Lineman" by Glen Campbell and "I Got You (I Feel Good)" by James Brown.
June 24, 2022	Garth Brooks	Mitch Rossell	The Garth Brooks Stadium Tour	130,000/ 130,000	$9,387,811	
June 25, 2022	Garth Brooks	Mitch Rossell	The Garth Brooks Stadium Tour	130,000/ 130,000	$9,387,811	
September 4, 2022	Mötley Crüe Def Leppard	Poison Joan Jett and the Blackhearts Classless Act	The Stadium Tour	46,077 / 46,077	$4,845,322	
June 3, 2023	Luke Combs	Riley Green; Lainey Wilson	Luke Combs World Tour			
August 23, 2024	Metallica	Pantera; Mammoth WVH	M72 World Tour	116,035 / 116,035	$12,672,187	
August 25, 2024	Metallica	Five Finger Death Punch; Ice Nine Kills	M72 World Tour	116,035 / 116,035	$12,672,187	
August 31, 2024	Pink	Sheryl Crow; KidCutUp; The Script	P!NK: Summer Carnival	58,616 / 58,616	$9,744,635	
July 19, 2025	The Weeknd	Mike Dean	After Hours til Dawn Tour	54,076 / 54,076	$7,002,903	
July 24, 2026	Post Malone	Jelly Roll, Carter Faith	Big Ass Stadium Tour 2			
July 25, 2026	Post Malone	Jelly Roll, Carter Faith	Big Ass Stadium Tour 2			This concert was cancelled shortly after beginning due to dangerous weather
August 9, 2026	AC/DC	The Pretty Reckless	Power Up Tour			
August 26, 2026	Guns N’ Roses	The Black Crowes	Guns N’ Roses World Tour 2026			

=== Ice hockey ===
The 2003 Heritage Classic was an outdoor ice hockey game played on November 22 between the National Hockey League (NHL) sides Edmonton Oilers and the Montreal Canadiens. The first regular-season NHL game to be played outdoors, it saw the Canadiens win 4–3 in front of a crowd of 57,167, despite temperatures of close to −18 °C, −30 °C (−22 °F) with wind chill. It was held to commemorate the 25th anniversary of the Oilers joining the NHL in 1979 and the 20th anniversary of their first Stanley Cup win in 1984. The Canadian Broadcasting Corporation television broadcast drew 2.747 million viewers in Canada, the second-highest audience for a regular-season NHL game. The 2023 Heritage Classic was played at Commonwealth Stadium, where the Edmonton Oilers hosted the Calgary Flames in the first outdoor NHL “Battle of Alberta” where the Oilers won 5–2.

=== Rugby union ===
Commonwealth Stadium has been used to host Churchill Cup matches. The 2004 edition had the first round played in Calgary and the second round played at Commonwealth Stadium. The 2005 edition saw all matches being played in Edmonton, with the final drawing a crowd of 17,000. In the 2006 edition the three finals were played at Commonwealth Stadium. The 2006 Women's Rugby World Cup was hosted in Edmonton and its suburb, St. Albert. Most of the Edmonton games were played at Ellerslie Rugby Park, but the final, third-place match and fifth-place match were all played at Commonwealth Stadium. On June 9, 2018, the Canadian Men's National team played host to Scotland, world number 6 at the time, in a test match at Commonwealth Stadium. Scotland came away with a 48–10 victory over Canada in front of a crowd of 12,824 at Commonwealth Stadium.

=== Other events ===
In 1980, the venue hosted a Billy Graham event during his Northern Canada Crusade.

In 1983, the Edmonton Trappers Triple-A baseball team defeated the California Angels of Major League Baseball in an exhibition baseball game witnessed by a crowd of 24,830.

On 26 July 2022, Pope Francis led an open-air Mass in front of an attendance of nearly 50,000 people as part of his first visit to Canada.

On 30 July 2022, Monster Jam made its only appearance at the stadium.

In 2024, it hosted the IFAF U20 World Junior Championship, marking the first time American football was played at the stadium.

== See also ==
- List of Commonwealth Games venues

Preceded by None; inaugural event	FIFA U-19 Women's World Championship; Final Venue; 2002	Succeeded by Rajamangala National Stadium; Bangkok
Preceded by Rhein-Neckar-Arena; Sinsheim	FIFA Women's World Cup; Opening Venue; 2015	Succeeded by Parc Olympique Lyonnais; Lyon
