= Gerry Inglis =

Canadian football player (1954–2025)

Profile
- Position: Offensive lineman

Personal information
- Born: August 20, 1954; Swift Current, Saskatchewan, Canada
- Died: September 2025 (aged 71); Portugal
- Listed height: 6 ft 0 in (1.83 m)
- Listed weight: 232 lb (105 kg)

Career information
- High school: Miller (Regina, Saskatchewan)
- University: Alberta
- CFL draft: 1976: 4th round, 29th overall pick

Career history
- 1977–1978: BC Lions
- 1978: Winnipeg Blue Bombers

Awards and highlights
- J. P. Metras Trophy (1976)

Gerry Inglis (August 20, 1954 – September 2025) was a Canadian professional football player who was an offensive lineman for the BC Lions and Winnipeg Blue Bombers of the Canadian Football League (CFL).

== Biography ==
Inglis was born in Swift Current, Saskatchewan, on August 20, 1954, and attended the University of Alberta where he played football from 1973 to 1976 under coach Jim Donlevy. During his university career, he was a Canada West all-star in 1975, all-Canadian in 1976, and was awarded the J. P. Metras Trophy in 1976 as the best lineman in university football. He graduated from the University of Alberta with a Bachelor of Education degree in 1978.

He was drafted by the BC Lions in the 1976 CFL draft and played two seasons with them. In 1978, he was traded to the Winnipeg Blue Bombers where he spent a season before being traded once again to the Toronto Argonauts. He did not play any games with Toronto, and ended his career in 1980.

Following his retirement from football, Inglis worked in the business and hospitality sectors. He also returned to coach the Golden Bears football team as an offensive line coach from 1981 to 1983, and 2001 to 2006. He also served on the Board of Regents for Athol Murray College of Notre Dame in Saskatchewan. In 2014, he was inducted into the University of Alberta's Sports Wall of Fame.

Inglis died in September 2025, while on a cycling trip through Portugal. He was 71. Inglis was married to Erin, with four children. His sons, Cale and Taylor also played football, the latter playing several seasons in the CFL with the Edmonton Eskimos.
