= Bart Evans =

Bart Evans may refer to:

- Bart Evans (baseball)
- Bart Evans (Canadian football)
- Bart Evans (polo)
