= 1978 Ottawa Rough Riders season =

Canadian football team season

- Owner: Allan Waters
- General manager: Frank Clair
- Head coach: George Brancato
- Home stadium: Lansdowne Park

Results
- Record: 12–4
- Division place: 1st, East
- Playoffs: Lost Eastern Final

Uniform

The 1978 Ottawa Rough Riders finished in first place in the Eastern Conference with a 12–4 record.

In 1978, Tony Gabriel was named the Outstanding Player in the CFL. He was the first Canadian to win that honour since Russ Jackson in 1969. No other Canadian has won the award since Gabriel. By 1978, Condredge Holloway's interception totals had dropped from 9, 6 and 5 in his first three years to just 2 on 214 attempts in 1978. Holloway's share of Ottawa's passing yards was between 25.7 – 32.8 percent over the first three years. In 1978, it soared to 49.7 percent. Holloway's higher profile and obvious improvement would be factors in Clements' May, 1979 trade to Saskatchewan.

== Preseason ==
Week	Date	Opponent	Result	Record
A	June 14	at Hamilton Tiger-Cats	W 24–16	1–0
B	June 21	vs. BC Lions	L 20–21	1–1
C	June 28	vs. Montreal Alouettes	L 4–25	1–2
D	July 4	at Winnipeg Blue Bombers	L 27–28	1–3

== Regular season ==
=== Standings ===
Eastern Football Conference
Team	GP	W	L	T	PF	PA	Pts
Ottawa Rough Riders	16	12	4	0	395	261	22
Montreal Alouettes	16	8	7	1	331	295	17
Hamilton Tiger-Cats	16	5	10	1	225	403	11
Toronto Argonauts	16	4	12	0	234	389	8

=== Schedule ===
Week	Date	Opponent	Result	Record
1	July 11	vs. Montreal Alouettes	W 17–10	1–0
2	July 26	at Toronto Argonauts	L 16–20	1–1
3	Aug 1	at Edmonton Eskimos	W 24–23	2–1
4	Aug 8	vs. Toronto Argonauts	W 37–18	3–1
5	Aug 15	vs. Hamilton Tiger-Cats	W 32–6	4–1
6	Aug 23	at Hamilton Tiger-Cats	W 36–8	5–1
7	Aug 30	vs. Calgary Stampeders	W 27–16	6–1
8	Sept 5	at Montreal Alouettes	W 23–18	7–1
8	Sept 9	vs. Winnipeg Blue Bombers	L 29–31	7–2
9	Bye			
10	Sept 24	vs. Saskatchewan Roughriders	W 53–18	8–2
11	Sept 30	at Toronto Argonauts	W 24–3	9–2
12	Oct 9	at Hamilton Tiger-Cats	L 5–25	9–3
13	Oct 15	vs. Montreal Alouettes	W 13–10	10–3
14	Oct 21	at BC Lions	L 17–20	10–4
15	Oct 28	vs. Hamilton Tiger-Cats	W 34–9	11–4
16	Nov 4	at Montreal Alouettes	W 34–9	12–4

== Postseason ==
Round	Date	Opponent	Result	Record
East Final	Nov 19	vs. Montreal Alouettes	L 16–21	0–1

== Player stats ==
=== Passing ===
Player	Attempts	Completions	Percentage	Yards	Touchdowns	Interceptions
Tom Clements	239	152	63.6	1990	17	12
Condredge Holloway	214	132	61.7	1970	12	2

=== Receiving ===
Player	Games Played	Receptions	Yards	Average	Long	Touchdowns
Jeff Avery	16	50	767	15.3	68	3
Tony Gabriel	16	67	1070	16.0	80	11
Art Green	16	40	580	14.5	47	6

=== Rushing ===
Player	Rushes	Yards	Average	Touchdowns	Long
Art Green	58	238	4.1	3	64

== Awards and honours ==
- CFL's Most Outstanding Player Award – Tony Gabriel (TE)
- CFL's Most Outstanding Canadian Award – Tony Gabriel (TE)
- CFL's Most Outstanding Offensive Lineman Award – Jim Coode (OT)

== Roster ==
1978 Ottawa Rough Riders final roster
Quarterbacks: 2 Tom Clements; 7 Condredge Holloway; Running backs: 20 Art Green; 28 Richard Holmes; 30 Mike Murphy; Wide receivers: 18 Jeff Avery P; 24 Ross Clarkson; 23 Pete Stenerson DB; Tight ends: 74 Dan Fournier; 77 Tony Gabriel	Offensive linemen: 61 Charlie Brandon G; 60 Jim Coode T; 51 Ray Honey T; 58 Doug McGee G; 65 Mark Perrelli T; 56 Frank Pomarico G; 64 Donn Smith C; 67 Jeff Turcotte T; Defensive linemen: 75 John Anderson DT; 68 Mike Fanucci DE; 53 Brian Hedges DT; 73 Jim Piaskoski DE; 79 Mike Raines DT; 69 Mike Riley DT	Linebackers: 41 Tim Berryman; 42 Brad Carr; 78 Ron Foxx; 76 John Glassford; 34 Mike Widger; Defensive backs: 21 Larry Brune; 10 Peter Crepin; 19 Kenny Downing; 22 Mike Nelms; 17 Wayne Tosh; Special teams: 5 J. T. Hay K; 14 Gerald Kunyk P; Italics indicate International player
