= 1978 Toronto Argonauts season =

CFL team season

- Head coach: Leo Cahill and Bud Riley
- Home stadium: Exhibition Stadium

Results
- Record: 4–12
- Division place: 4th, East
- Playoffs: did not qualify

Uniform

The 1978 Toronto Argonauts finished in fourth place in the Eastern Conference with a 4–12 record and failed to make the playoffs.

== Regular season ==
=== Standings ===
Eastern Football Conference
Team	GP	W	L	T	PF	PA	Pts
Ottawa Rough Riders	16	11	5	0	395	261	22
Montreal Alouettes	16	8	7	1	331	295	17
Hamilton Tiger-Cats	16	5	10	1	225	403	11
Toronto Argonauts	16	4	12	0	234	389	8

=== Schedule ===
Week	Date	Opponent	Location	Final score	Attendance	Record
1	July 12	vs. Hamilton Tiger-Cats	Exhibition Stadium	W 34–22	49,950	1–0
2	July 18	at Montreal Alouettes	Olympic Stadium	L 23–30	51,388	1–1
3	July 26	vs. Ottawa Rough Riders	Exhibition Stadium	W 20–16	48,159	2–1
4	Aug 2	vs. Montreal Alouettes	Exhibition Stadium	W 16–11	52,308	3–1
5	Aug 8	at Ottawa Rough Riders	Landsdowne Park	L 18–37	30,723	3–2
6	Aug 16	vs. Edmonton Eskimos	Exhibition Stadium	L 3–40	49,168	3–3
7	Aug 27	at Saskatchewan Roughriders	Taylor Field	L 10–31	19,341	3–4
8	Sept 4	at Hamilton Tiger-Cats	Ivor Wynne Stadium	L 16–19	31,777	3–5
9	Sept 10	vs. Montreal Alouettes	Exhibition Stadium	L 2–27	46,202	3–6
10	Sept 16	at Winnipeg Blue Bombers	Winnipeg Stadium	L 14–19	27,201	3–7
11	Bye					
12	Sept 30	vs. Ottawa Rough Riders	Exhibition Stadium	L 3–24	45,210	3–8
13	Oct 7	at Calgary Stampeders	McMahon Stadium	L 16–22	26,190	3–9
14	Oct 14	vs. Hamilton Tiger-Cats	Exhibition Stadium	W 21–7	41,250	4–9
15	Oct 21	at Montreal Alouettes	Olympic Stadium	L 7–30	45,547	4–10
16	Oct 29	vs. BC Lions	Exhibition Stadium	L 31–15	40,120	4–11
17	Nov 5	at Hamilton Tiger-Cats	Ivor Wynne Stadium	L 16–23	31,005	4–12

== Roster ==
1978 Toronto Argonauts final roster
Quarterbacks: 12 Rodney Allison; 18 Chuck Ealey; Running backs: 24 Mark Bragagnolo; 29 Buddy Hardeman; 21 Terry Metcalf; Wide receivers: 33 Dwight Edwards; 8 Mark McDonald; 21 Slade Willis; Tight ends: 7 M. L. Harris; 72 Peter Muller	Offensive linemen: 65 Nick Bastaja G; 63 Tom Davis G; 64 Bill Ellenbogen T; 66 Greg Fairchild G; 52 John Foubert T; 58 Stew Francis C/G; 57 Ralph Hill G/C; 69 Bill Norton G/T; 68 Doug Redl T; Defensive linemen: 62 Ecomet Burley DT; 79 Jim Corrigall DE; 42 Doug MacIver DT/DE; 61 Bruce Smith DT/DE; 77 Wayne Smith DE	Linebackers: 44 Brad Cousino; 17 Gordie Knowlton; 35 Rich Lewis; 76 Harold Randolph; 53 Rick Razzano; 73 Rick Sowieta; Defensive backs: 19 Wayne Allison; 20 Paul Bennett; 30 Billy Hardee; 16 Eric Harris; 34 Dwight Hicks; 15 Jim Marshall; 23 Dave Rigg; 14 Mike Williams	Special teams: 13 Ken Clark P; 9 Ian Sunter K/P; Injured list: 52 Dennis Heim DT

Italics indicate International player
