= 16th Vanier Cup =

1980 Canadian university football championship

| Alberta Golden Bears | Ottawa Gee-Gees |
|---|---|
| (6–2) | (6–1) |
| 40 | 21 |
| Head coach: Jim Donlevy | Head coach: Cam Innes |
| | 1 | 2 | 3 | 4 | Total |
|---|---|---|---|---|---|
| Alberta Golden Bears | 0 | 0 | 0 | 40 | 40 |
| Ottawa Gee-Gees | 0 | 0 | 0 | 21 | 21 |
- Date: November 29, 1980
- Stadium: Varsity Stadium
- Location: Toronto
- Ted Morris Memorial Trophy: Forrest Kennerd, Alberta
- Attendance: 11,000

The 16th Vanier Cup was played on November 29, 1980, at Varsity Stadium in Toronto, Ontario, and decided the CIAU football champion for the 1980 season. The Alberta Golden Bears won their third championship by defeating the Ottawa Gee-Gees by a score of 40-21.
