= J. P. Metras Trophy =

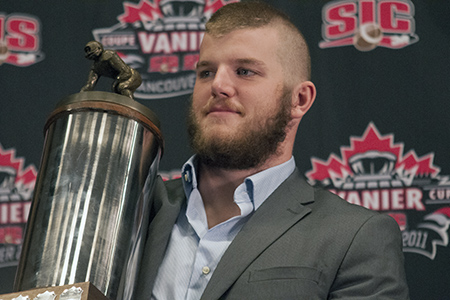
- Arnaud Gascon-Nadon with the J. P. Metras Trophy in 2011
- Sport: Canadian football
- League: U Sports
- Awarded for: Most outstanding down lineman in the league

History
- First award: 1974
- First winner: Bart Evans, Manitoba Bisons
- Most wins: Mathieu Betts (3 times), Laval Rouge et Or
- Most recent: Erik Andersen, Western Mustangs

The J. P. Metras Trophy is awarded annually to the most outstanding down lineman in U Sports football. The award was first initiated in 1974 and is named after John P. Metras.

Metras was a former coach of the Western Mustangs from 1939 to 1969 and was inducted to the Canadian Football Hall of Fame in 1980.

The American equivalent to the J. P. Metras Trophy is the Lombardi Award.

== List of winners ==
Year	Athlete	Team
1974	Bart Evans	Manitoba
1975	Mark Pothier	Saint Mary's
1976	Gerry Inglis	Alberta
1977	Dick Bakker	Queen's
1978	Dave Willox	Alberta
1979	Jim Muller	Queen's
1980	Scott McArthur	Calgary
1981	Tony Grassa	StFX
1982	Peter Langford	Guelph
1983	Jim DeSilva	Carleton
1984	Boyd Young	Ottawa
1985	Mike Schad	Queen's
1986	Louie Godry	Guelph
1987	Pierre Vercheval	Western
1988	Veron Stiliadis	Wilfrid Laurier
1989	Chris Gioskos	Ottawa
1990	Chris Morris	Toronto
1991	Jason Rauhaus	Manitoba
1992	Chris Konrad	Calgary
1993	Paul Chesser	Concordia
1994	Paul Connery	Bishop's
1995	Harry Van Hofwegen	Carleton
1996	James Repesse	Saskatchewan
1997	Mike Kushnir	StFX
1998	Garret Everson	Calgary
1999	Tyson St. James	UBC
2000	Randy Chevrier	McGill
2001	Carl Gourgues	Laval
2002	Israel Idonije	Manitoba
2003	Ibrahim Khan	Simon Fraser
2004	Troy Cunningham	Concordia
2005	Dominic Picard	Laval
2006	Chris Best	Waterloo
2007	Scott Evans	Wilfrid Laurier
2008	Étienne Légaré	Laval
2009	Matt Morencie	Windsor
2010	Arnaud Gascon-Nadon	Laval
2011	Arnaud Gascon-Nadon	Laval
2012	Ben D'Aguilar	McMaster
2013	Laurent Duvernay-Tardif	McGill
2014	Ettore Lattanzio	Ottawa
2015	David Onyemata	Manitoba
2016	Mathieu Betts	Laval
2017	Mathieu Betts	Laval
2018	Mathieu Betts	Laval
2019	Andrew Seinet-Spaulding	McGill
2021	Deionte Knight	Western
2022	Theo Benedet	UBC
2023	Theo Benedet	UBC
2024	Giordano Vaccaro	Manitoba
2025	Erik Andersen	Western

== See also ==
- Hec Crighton Trophy
- Presidents' Trophy
- Peter Gorman Trophy
- Russ Jackson Award
