= Theo Benedet =

Canadian gridiron football player (born 2001)

No. 79 – Chicago Bears
- Position: Offensive tackle
- Roster status: Active

Personal information
- Born: October 12, 2001 (age 25); Toronto, Ontario, Canada
- Listed height: 6 ft 7 in (2.01 m)
- Listed weight: 304 lb (138 kg)

Career information
- High school: Handsworth (North Vancouver)
- University: UBC (2019–2023)
- NFL draft: 2024: undrafted
- CFL draft: 2024: 2nd round, 15th overall pick

Career history
- Chicago Bears (2024–present)

Awards and highlights
- 2× J. P. Metras Trophy (2022, 2023); 2× First-team All-Canadian (2022, 2023)

Career NFL statistics as of 2025
- Games played: 16
- Games started: 8
- Stats at Pro Football Reference

Theo Benedet (born October 12, 2001) is a Canadian professional football offensive tackle for the Chicago Bears of the National Football League (NFL). He played U Sports football for the UBC Thunderbirds. His nickname is the "Canadian Eagle".

== Early life ==
Benedet was born in Toronto, Ontario and grew up in Vancouver, British Columbia. He attended Handsworth Secondary School. He grew up a fan of the BC Lions but did not compete at football seriously until he was in 10th grade at Handsworth. He committed to play U Sports football for the University of British Columbia (UBC) Thunderbirds.

== University career ==
Benedet immediately became a starter on the offensive line for UBC as a first year in 2019. The 2020 season was cancelled due to the COVID-19 pandemic. He appeared in seven games during the 2021 season. In 2022, he was named first-team All-Canadian and was the winner of the J. P. Metras Trophy for best lineman nationally, helping the team have one of the best U Sports rushing offences along with reaching their first Hardy Cup in four years. He was the only U Sports player selected to the 2023 East–West Shrine Bowl. Although projected to be a top pick in the 2023 CFL draft along with fellow UBC offensive lineman Giovanni Manu, they both opted to return for a final season. In 2023, Benedet repeated as a first-team All-Canadian selection and as the winner of the J. P. Metras Trophy, becoming the first offensive lineman to win the trophy twice in a row; he also helped the Thunderbirds reach the Vanier Cup for the first time since 2015.

== Professional career ==
Pre-draft measurables
Height	Weight	Arm length	Hand span	Wingspan	40-yard dash	10-yard split	20-yard split	20-yard shuttle	Three-cone drill	Vertical jump	Broad jump	Bench press
6 ft 7 in (2.01 m)	295 lb (134 kg)	32 1/8 in (0.82 m)	9 3/4 in (0.25 m)	6 ft 6 3/4 in (2.00 m)	5.16 s	1.77 s	3.01 s	4.60 s	7.69 s	34.5 in (0.88 m)	9 ft 6 in (2.90 m)	23 reps
All values from Pro Day

Benedet was invited to the College Gridiron Showcase. In addition to being projected as a top pick for the 2024 CFL draft, he also received attention as a potential selection in the 2024 NFL draft. He was not selected in the NFL draft, but later signed with the Chicago Bears as a undrafted free agent. Benedet was later drafted in the second round (15th overall) by the BC Lions in the 2024 CFL draft. He was waived on August 27, and re-signed to the practice squad. He signed a reserve/future contract with the Bears on January 6, 2025.

During the 2025 offseason, Benedet competed with the incumbent Braxton Jones, Kiran Amegadjie, and Ozzy Trapilo to be the Bears' starter at left tackle. Jones won the role while Benedet began the year as his backup and the swing tackle. In Week 4 against the Las Vegas Raiders, Benedet took over at right tackle after Darnell Wright suffered an injury before slotting to left tackle in Jones' place. The Bears named Benedet the starting LT from that point on. Benedet suffered a quad injury in November, after which Trapilo became the new starter. Upon his recovery, Benedet resumed being the swing tackle. During the Week 14 game versus the Green Bay Packers, he reported in as an eligible receiver for a trick play but was clipped by a Packers player as he ran his route, prompting quarterback Caleb Williams to throw to tight end Colston Loveland for the touchdown instead. Benedet continued to take occasional snaps as an extra receiver or tight end throughout the season, including running deeper routes to assist in blocking downfield.

With Trapilo still recovering from injury, the Bears' left tackle competition returned in 2026 between Jones, Amegadjie, and Jedrick Wills. Benedet was initially seen as just a "break-glass in case of emergency" player rather than a potential starter; he primarily spent training camp as a backup right tackle before lining up at LT in the preseason. He began the 2026 season as the swing tackle. After Jones hurt his knee in Week 3, Benedet became the new starting left tackle until Jones or Trapilo returned.
