= Ray Johnson (Canadian football) =

Canadian football player (1933–2006)

Profile
- Positions: Guard, defensive tackle

Personal information
- Born: October 8, 1933; Brantford, Ontario, Canada
- Died: October 24, 2006 (aged 73); Ancaster, Ontario, Canada
- Listed height: 6 ft 2 in (1.88 m)
- Listed weight: 190 lb (86 kg)

Career information
- College: Western Ontario
- CFL draft: 1958: 3rd round, 24th overall pick

Career history

Playing
- 1958–1959: Edmonton Eskimos

Coaching
- 1965–1968: McMaster (Assistant)
- 1969–1971: McMaster
- 1973–1980: McMaster

Head coaching record
- Career: 20–64–2 (.244)

Raymond B. Johnson (October 3, 1933 – October 24, 2006) was a Canadian professional football player and coach who played for the Edmonton Eskimos of the Canadian Football League from 1958 to 1959 and was head coach of the McMaster Marauders football team from 1969 to 1980.

== Playing ==
A native of Brantford, Ontario, Johnson played junior football for the Brantford Barons. After one season in the backfield, new head coach Frank Gnup moved him to the offensive line and linebacker. After three seasons with the Barons, Johnson entered the University of Western Ontario. He played guard and defensive tackle for the Western Mustangs football team, was an intercollegiate wrestling champion, and competed in the long jump for the school's track and field team.

Johnson was selected in the third round of the 1958 CFL draft by the Edmonton Eskimos. Edmonton Journal sportswriter Don Fleming described him as "a cinch to make the team on his first try" but missed the entire regular season with a fractured ankle. He played five games for Edmonton in 1959 before reinjuring his ankle. He returned for the third game of the Western final, which Edmonton lost to the Winnipeg Blue Bombers.

== Coaching ==
Johnson retired after the 1959 season and spent five years as a high school teacher in London, Ontario. In 1965, he joined the staff of McMaster University as head wrestling coach and assistant football coach. He was on the coach staff of the Marauders team that won the 1967 Atlantic Bowl and played in the 3rd Vanier Cup. He was promoted to head football coach in 1969 and held the position until 1980, taking a one-year sabbatical in 1972. He compiled an overall record of 20–64–2. He remained at McMaster as a professor and was chair of men's athletics from 1985 to 1991.

== Politics ==
Johnson spent many years working for the Progressive Conservative Party of Ontario's executive in the Wentworth North riding. Dissatisfied with Brian Mulroney's leadership, he considered running as a member of the Reform Party of Canada in the 1993 Canadian federal election, but ultimately decided that he could not support parts of party's platform. Following Mulroney's resignation, Johnson sought and won the Progressive Conservative nomination in Hamilton—Wentworth. He finished third behind Liberal John H. Bryden and Reformer Mark Mullins.

== Community service ==
Johnson helped found the Hamilton-Wentworth Crime Stoppers and worked to develop local alcohol and drug rehabilitation programs. He was a member of the organizing committee for the 2000 International Children's Games, which was held in Hamilton, Ontario and worked with groups that brought 2006 Ontario Summer Games to the city. He served on the boards of the Bridge from Prison to the Community program, Hamilton-Wentworth Children's Aid Society, and the United Way.

== Honours ==
Johnson was inducted into the Brantford and Area Sports Hall of Recognition in 1984, the Western Mustangs Sports Hall of Fame in 1989, the McMaster Athletics Hall of Fame in 1993, and Hamilton's Gallery of Distinction in 2004. He was awarded the Queen Elizabeth II Golden Jubilee Medal in 2002 and was named the 2004 Royal Bank Distinguished Citizen of the Year.
