= John Olenchalk =

American football player (born 1955)

No. 41, 53, 63
- Positions: Linebacker, center, long snapper

Personal information
- Born: November 27, 1955 (age 70); Stockton, California, U.S.
- Listed height: 6 ft 0 in (1.83 m)
- Listed weight: 228 lb (103 kg)

Career information
- High school: Antioch (CA)
- College: Stanford
- NFL draft: 1977: undrafted

Career history
- Montreal Alouettes (1978); Kansas City Chiefs (1981–1982)
- Stats at Pro Football Reference

John Olenchalk (born November 27, 1955) is an American former football linebacker and center. He played for the Kansas City Chiefs from 1981 to 1982.

== Professional career ==
=== Montreal Alouettes ===
Olenchalk played for the Montreal Alouettes in 1978, including in the 1978 Grey Cup.

=== Kansas City Chiefs ===
Olenchalk played for the Kansas City Chiefs during the 1981 and 1982 seasons.
