= 1978 Montreal Alouettes season =

Canadian football team season

- Head coach: Joe Scannella
- Home stadium: Olympic Stadium

Results
- Record: 8–7–1
- Division place: 2nd, East
- Playoffs: Lost Grey Cup

Uniform

The 1978 Montreal Alouettes finished the season in second place in the Eastern Conference with an 8–7–1 record and appeared in the Grey Cup. The Alouettes would fail to defend their Grey Cup title, losing the championship game to the in a rematch vs the Edmonton Eskimos 20–13.

== Preseason ==
Game	Date	Opponent	Results		Venue	Attendance
Game	Date	Opponent	Score	Record	Venue	Attendance
A	June 13	at BC Lions	L 9–15	0–1	Empire Stadium	21,608
B	June 20	vs. Calgary Stampeders	W 14–12	1–1	Olympic Stadium	28,484
C	June 28	at Ottawa Rough Riders	W 25–4	2–1	Lansdowne Park	16,961
D	July 4	vs. Toronto Argonauts	W 27–24	3–1	Olympic Stadium	34,191

== Regular season ==
=== Standings ===
Eastern Football Conference
Team	GP	W	L	T	PF	PA	Pts
Ottawa Rough Riders	16	11	5	0	395	261	22
Montreal Alouettes	16	8	7	1	331	295	17
Hamilton Tiger-Cats	16	5	10	1	225	403	11
Toronto Argonauts	16	4	12	0	234	389	8

=== Schedule ===
Week	Game	Date	Opponent	Results		Venue	Attendance
Week	Game	Date	Opponent	Score	Record	Venue	Attendance
1	1	July 11	at Ottawa Rough Riders	L 10–17	0–1	Lansdowne Park	25,391
2	2	July 18	vs. Toronto Argonauts	W 30–23	1–1	Olympic Stadium	51,388
3	3	July 26	vs. Hamilton Tiger-Cats	W 24–12	2–1	Olympic Stadium	52,132
4	4	Aug 2	at Toronto Argonauts	L 11–16	2–2	Exhibition Stadium	52,308
5	5	Aug 9	at Calgary Stampeders	W 28–14	3–2	McMahon Stadium	26,888
6	Bye						
7	6	Aug 22	vs. BC Lions	W 30–26	4–2	Olympic Stadium	65,132
8	7	Aug 29	at Winnipeg Blue Bombers	L 10–36	4–3	Winnipeg Stadium	27,201
9	8	Sept 5	vs. Ottawa Rough Riders	L 18–23	4–4	Olympic Stadium	62,197
10	9	Sept 10	at Toronto Argonauts	W 16–11	5–4	Exhibition Stadium	46,202
11	10	Sept 17	vs. Hamilton Tiger-Cats	W 14–4	6–4	Olympic Stadium	50,567
12	11	Sept 23	at Hamilton Tiger-Cats	L 7–17	6–5	Ivor Wynne Stadium	22,794
13	12	Oct 1	vs. Edmonton Eskimos	L 22–42	6–6	Olympic Stadium	54,562
14	13	Oct 8	at Saskatchewan Roughriders	T 35–35	6–6–1	Taylor Field	20,907
15	14	Oct 15	at Ottawa Rough Riders	L 10–13	6–7–1	Lansdowne Park	33,976
16	15	Oct 21	vs. Toronto Argonauts	W 30–7	7–7–1	Olympic Stadium	45,547
17	Bye						
18	16	Nov 4	vs. Ottawa Rough Riders	W 26–8	8–7–1	Olympic Stadium	54,159

== Postseason ==
Round	Date	Opponent	Results		Venue	Attendance
Round	Date	Opponent	Score	Record	Venue	Attendance
East Semi-Final	Nov 11	vs. Hamilton Tiger-Cats	W 35–20	1–0	Olympic Stadium	37,017
East Final	Nov 19	at Ottawa Rough Riders	W 21–16	2–0	Lansdowne Park	31,960
Grey Cup	Nov 26	vs. Edmonton Eskimos	L 13–20	2–1	Exhibition Stadium	54,386

=== Grey Cup ===
Team	Q1	Q2	Q3	Q4	Total
Edmonton Eskimos	10	4	3	3	20
Montreal Alouettes	3	0	7	3	13

== Roster ==
1978 Montreal Alouettes final roster
Quarterbacks: 7 Joe Barnes; 9 Gerry Dattilio; 17 Larry Lawrence; 14 Sonny Wade P; Running backs: 26 David Green; 33 Chuck McMann; 30 John O'Leary; 36 Larry Smith; 32 Ken Starch; Wide receivers: 24 Vic Anonsen; 22 Bob Gaddis; 10 Ian Mofford	Tight ends: 74 Peter Dalla Riva; Offensive linemen: 50 Pat Bonnett G; 58 Randy Halsall G; 44 Mike Hameluck C/G; 61 Doug Payton T/G; 53 Doug Smith C; 52 Ray Watrin G; 60 Bill Winters T; 67 Dan Yochum T; Defensive linemen: 77 Junior Ah You DE; 62 Gabriel Grégoire DE; 75 Gord Judges DT; 51 Phil Luke DT/DE; 64 Glen Weir DT	Linebackers: 39 Wally Buono P; 72 Carl Crennel; 47 Jerry Friesen; 76 Chuck Zapiec; Defensive backs: 16 Jim Burrow; 27 Dwayne Crump; 18 Dickie Harris; 20 Ty Morris; 23 Tony Proudfoot; 21 Randy Rhino; 8 Larry Uteck; Special teams: 11 Don Sweet K; Injured list: 41 John Olenchalk LB; Italics indicate American players
