= Arnaud Gascon-Nadon =

Canadian football player (born 1988)

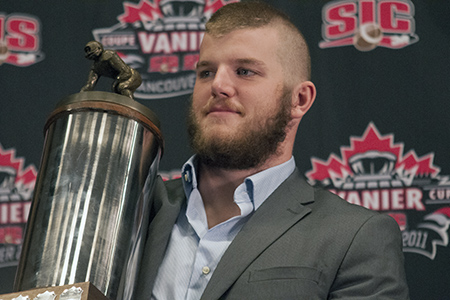
- Gascon-Nadon with the J. P. Metras Trophy in 2011

No. 95
- Position: Defensive lineman

Personal information
- Born: July 10, 1988 (age 38); Montreal, Quebec, Canada
- Listed height: 6 ft 3 in (1.91 m)
- Listed weight: 250 lb (113 kg)

Career information
- College: Rice
- University: Laval
- CFL draft: 2012: 3rd round, 17th overall pick

Career history
- 2013–2015: Hamilton Tiger-Cats
- 2016–2017: Ottawa Redblacks
- 2018–2019: Edmonton Eskimos

Awards and highlights
- Grey Cup champion (2016); 2× Vanier Cup champion (2010, 2012); 2× J. P. Metras Trophy (2010, 2011); Texas Bowl champion (2008)
- Stats at CFL.ca

Arnaud Gascon-Nadon (born July 10, 1988) is a Canadian former professional football defensive lineman who played in the Canadian Football League (CFL). He was selected 17th overall by the Tiger-Cats in the 2012 CFL draft. After the 2011 CIS season, he was ranked as the 13th best player in the Canadian Football League's Amateur Scouting Bureau January rankings for players eligible in the 2012 CFL draft, and ninth by players in Canadian Interuniversity Sport. Gascon-Nadon played CIS football with the Laval Rouge et Or and for the Rice University Owls in 2008.

Gascon-Nadon was with the Hamilton Tiger-Cats from 2013 to 2015 and with the Ottawa Redblacks in 2016 and 2017, winning the Grey Cup with them in 2016. He dressed in six games for the Edmonton Eskimos in 2018. He became a free agent after the 2018 season. Gascon-Nadon officially announced his retirement in the summer of 2019.

He endorsed the Conservative Party of Quebec for the 2022 Quebec general election.
