= 1978 BC Lions season =

Canadian football team season

- General manager: Bob Ackles
- Head coach: Vic Rapp
- Home stadium: Empire Stadium

Results
- Record: 7–7–2
- Division place: 4th, West
- Playoffs: did not qualify

The 1978 BC Lions finished in fourth place in the Western Conference with a 7–7–2 record and failed to make the playoffs. A six-game mid-season losing streak, primarily to western opponents, cost the Lions a playoff spot.

Quarterback Jerry Tagge had 3134 yards passing and 20 interceptions. The offence was driven by rookie running back Larry Key, who had 1054 yards rushing, 504 yards receiving and 10 touchdowns.

Centre Al Wilson was selected to the CFL all-star team for the 4th consecutive season.

A new uniform was introduced which included the white helmet, orange and white colour scheme and now iconic mountain lion head logo. The traditional secondary colour of black was altered to a dark brown. The uniforms would become synonymous with the powerhouse teams of the 1980s in brand new BC Place Stadium. The logo, despite a few changes along the way since, is still used by the team to this day.

== Offseason ==
=== CFL draft ===
Round	Pick	Player	Position	School

== Preseason ==
Game	Date	Opponent	Results		Venue	Attendance
Game	Date	Opponent	Score	Record	Venue	Attendance

== Regular season ==
=== Season standings ===
Western Football Conference
Team	GP	W	L	T	PF	PA	Pts
Edmonton Eskimos	16	10	4	2	452	301	22
Calgary Stampeders	16	9	4	3	381	311	21
Winnipeg Blue Bombers	16	9	7	0	371	351	18
BC Lions	16	7	7	2	359	308	16
Saskatchewan Roughriders	16	4	11	1	330	459	9

=== Season schedule ===
Game	Date	Opponent	Results	
Game	Date	Opponent	Score	Record
1	July 11	vs. Winnipeg Blue Bombers	W 30–14	1–0
2	July 19	at Calgary Stampeders	L 21–23	1–1
3	July 25	vs. Calgary Stampeders	T 19–19	1–1–1
4	Aug 1	vs. Hamilton Tiger-Cats	T 22–22	1–1–2
5	Aug 8	at Saskatchewan Roughriders	W 43–14	2–1–2
6	Aug 15	vs. Saskatchewan Roughriders	W 24–23	3–1–2
7	Aug 22	at Montreal Alouettes	L 26–30	3–2–2
8	Aug 30	at Edmonton Eskimos	L 10–18	3–3–2
9	Sept 9	vs. Saskatchewan Roughriders	L 9–15	3–4–2
10	Sept 17	at Calgary Stampeders	L 4–14	3–5–2
11	Sept 24	at Winnipeg Blue Bombers	L 25–32	3–6–2
12	Sept 30	vs. Winnipeg Blue Bombers	L 27–38	3–7–2
13	Oct 9	at Edmonton Eskimos	W 15–3	4–7–2
14	Oct 21	vs. Ottawa Rough Riders	W 20–17	5–7–2
15	Oct 29	at Toronto Argonauts	W 31–15	6–7–2
16	Nov 4	vs. Edmonton Eskimos	W 33–11	7–7–2

=== Offensive leaders ===
Player	Passing yds	Rushing yds	Receiving yds	TD
Jerry Tagge	3134	1	0	0
Larry Key		1054	506	10
Al Charuk		0	790	4
Leon Bright		90	781	3
John Henry White		276	195	2
Terry Bailey		39	391	2
Jim Young		0	343	2

== Roster ==
1978 BC Lions final roster
Quarterbacks: 6 Joe Paopao; 8 Jerry Tagge; Running backs: 36 Terry Bailey; 34 Calvin Culliver; 31 Harry Holt; 11 Larry Key; 19 Don Taylor; 20 John Henry White; Wide receivers: 26 Leon Bright; 25 Al Charuk; 30 Jim Young; Tight ends: 71 Ricky Ellis	Offensive linemen: 68 John Blain G/T; 69 John Blake G/T; 51 Tom Kudaba G; 54 Glenn Leonhard G; 55 Jim Lohmann T; 66 Al Simpson T; 64 Larry Watkins T; 52 Al Wilson C; Defensive linemen: 63 Rick Goltz DT/DE; 78 Frank Landy DT; 77 Louie Richardson DE; 61 Doug Seymour DT; 60 Drew Taylor DE; Special teams: 5 Lui Passaglia K/P	Linebackers: 45 Sam Britts; 40 Paul Giroday; 37 Glen Jackson; 50 Tom Schultz; Defensive backs: 10 John Beaton; 28 Doug Carlson; 32 Grady Cavness; 16 Devon Ford; 14 Joe Fourqurean; 18 Ken Hinton; 3 Hal Lund; 17 Frank Oliver; Injured list: 65 Andre Anderson DT; Italics indicate International player

== Awards and records ==
=== 1978 CFL All-Stars ===
- C – Al Wilson, CFL All-Star
