= Steve Mendryk =

Canadian professional football player

Profile
- Position: Halfback

Personal information
- Born: October 1, 1928; Edmonton, Alberta, Canada
- Died: November 17, 2011 (aged 83); Edmonton, Alberta, Canada
- Listed height: 6 ft 1 in (1.85 m)
- Listed weight: 187 lb (85 kg)

Career information
- University: Alberta

Career history

Playing
- 1949–1956: Edmonton Eskimos
- 1958: Edmonton Eskimos

Coaching
- 1959: University of Alberta

Awards and highlights
- 3× Grey Cup champion (1954, 1955, 1956)

Stephen Warren Mendryk (October 1, 1928 – November 17, 2011) was a Canadian professional football player who played for the Edmonton Eskimos. He won the Grey Cup with them in 1954, 1955 and 1956. Born and raised in Edmonton, Alberta, he previously attended and played football at the University of Alberta. Mendryk was later a professor at the University of Alberta, attending the University of California, Berkeley, and University of Oregon for his Ph.D.. He died of congestive heart failure in 2011.
