= 8th Vanier Cup =

1972 Canadian university football championship

Alberta Golden Bears	Waterloo Lutheran Golden Hawks
(7–1)	(4–2)
20	7
Head coach: Jim Donlevy	Head coach: Dave "Tuffy" Knight
	1	2	3	4	Total
Alberta Golden Bears	0	0	0	20	20
Waterloo Lutheran Golden Hawks	0	0	0	7	7
- Date: November 25, 1972
- Stadium: Varsity Stadium
- Location: Toronto
- Ted Morris Memorial Trophy: Roger Comartin, Alberta; Andy MacLeod, Alberta (co-winners)
- Attendance: 10,192

The 8th Vanier Cup was played on November 25, 1972, at Varsity Stadium in Toronto, Ontario, and decided the CIAU football champion for the 1972 season. The Alberta Golden Bears won their second championship by defeating the Waterloo Lutheran Golden Hawks by a score of 20-7.
