= Bob Lubig =

Dutch gridiron football player (born 1955)

No. 54, 59, 51
- Positions: Guard, Offensive tackle

Personal information
- Born: September 17, 1955 (age 71); Rotterdam, Netherlands

Career information
- College: Montana State

Career history
- 1978–1981: Calgary Stampeders
- 1981: Toronto Argonauts
- 1982-1985: Calgary Stampeders
- 1986: Montreal Alouettes

Robert Lubig (born September 17, 1955, in Rotterdam, Netherlands) is a former Canadian Football League offensive lineman who played nine seasons in the CFL.
