= Maury Van Vliet =

- Born: Maurice Lewis Van Vliet; August 3, 1913; Bellingham, Washington
- Died: April 4, 2001 (aged 87)

Maurice Lewis (Maury) Van Vliet, OC (August 3, 1913 – April 4, 2001) was a USA-born Canadian academic who taught physical education and fitness.

Born in Bellingham, Washington, the son of Frank D. and Nellie (Booker) Van Vliet, he was raised in Monrovia, California. He played baseball and football at the University of Oregon where he received a B.Sc. in 1935. He received a Master of Science from the University of Oregon in 1940 and a Doctor of Education from the University of California, Los Angeles in 1951.

He declined an offer from the New York Yankees in order to accept the newly created position of physical education director at the University of British Columbia and started in 1935. He was a coach of the Varsity basketball, football, track, boxing, and wrestling teams.

In 1945, he moved to Edmonton, Alberta to become a professor. He was Head (1945 to 1954), Director (1954 to 1964), and Dean (1964 to 1975) of the Faculty of Physical Education and Recreation at the University of Alberta. He was the president and CEO of the organizing committee of the 1978 Commonwealth Games.

== Honours ==
- In 1978, he was made an Officer of the Order of Canada.
- In 1993, he was inducted into the University of British Columbia's Sports Hall of Fame.
- In 1997, he was inducted into Canada's Sports Hall of Fame.
- He received honorary degrees from the University of Western Ontario (1973), University of Windsor (1978), University of Alberta (1979), Dalhousie University (1979), Queen's University (1980), and University of Victoria (1982).
