= Brian Fryer =

Canadian gridiron football player (born 1953)

No. 85
- Position: Wide receiver

Personal information
- Born: July 16, 1953 (age 73); Edmonton, Alberta, Canada

Career information
- University: Alberta
- NFL draft: 1976: 8th round, 234th overall pick
- CFL draft: 1976

Career history
- 1976: Washington Redskins
- 1978–1985: Edmonton Eskimos
- 1985: Ottawa Rough Riders

Awards and highlights
- 5× Grey Cup champion (1978–1982); Hec Crighton Trophy (1975)
- Stats at Pro Football Reference
- Canadian Football Hall of Fame (Class of 2013)

Brian Fryer (born July 16, 1953) is a Canadian former professional football player who starred at wide receiver for the University of Alberta, and played professionally for the Washington Redskins of the National Football League (NFL) and the Edmonton Eskimos and Ottawa Rough Riders of the Canadian Football League (CFL).

== Early life ==
Fryer was a three-sport athlete at Strathcona High School in Edmonton from the fall of 1968 to the spring of 1971, starring on the Lords' football, basketball and track and field teams all three years. As an intermediate boy in his grade 11 year at the Alberta Schools Athletic Association provincial track and field meet in Calgary, Fryer won and set the ASAA record for the 120-yard hurdles with a time of 14.4 seconds. The following year at the provincial championship in Edmonton, Fryer once again won the 120-yard hurdles, setting a new record of 14.2 seconds. He also broke the records in both the long jump (7.08 m) and triple jump (13.8 m). In total Fryer won four gold medals and set three provincial records in ASAA competition. In his last year Fryer was awarded the Most Outstanding Athlete award.

== University career ==
In Fryer's first season the Alberta Golden Bears went 9–1 and beat Waterloo Lutheran University (now Wilfrid Laurier University) 20–7 for the Vanier Cup.

On October 12, 1974, Fryer set the single-game Canadian Interuniversity Sport (now U Sports) record with 227 yards receiving against the University of Calgary. In 1974, he set the single-season CIS record with 58 receptions, and recorded the first 1,000-yard receiving season in CIS history with 1,068 yards. In addition he scored 16 touchdowns, including a CIS record 14 receiving touchdowns. His total of 16 touchdowns on the season was the third-highest in a single-season, behind Paul Brule's 25 touchdowns at St. Francis Xavier University in 1967 and Brule's 20 touchdowns at St. FX in 1966. He finished 1974 as an all Canadian all-star and was nominated as the Canada West's nominee for the Hec Creighton Trophy.

In 1975, Fryer had 51 receptions for 943 yards during the season and won the Hec Crighton Trophy, which was awarded annually to the most outstanding football player in Canadian Interuniversity Sport. As well, he was on the all Canadian all star team.

Fryer finished his career at the University of Alberta with the CIS records for most receiving yards in a game, a season and a career, and the records for most receptions in a season and a career, and the most receiving touchdowns in a season. He made a record 136 career receptions, for a record 2,655 career yards receiving. His career total of 34 touchdowns was second on the CIS career list to the 51 scored by Paul Brule at St. Francis Xavier University from 1964 to 1967. His career total of 20 receiving touchdowns tied him for second all-time with all star wide receiver Mike Kirkpatrick of Saint Mary's University (Halifax), six behind Eric Walter's record 26 at McGill University. Fryer also totaled 1,068 rushing yards and 505 kickoff return yards during his four years at Alberta.

== Professional career ==
=== Washington Redskins ===
Fryer's accomplishments at the University of Alberta caught the attention of Bob Windish, the director of player personnel for the Montreal Alouettes of the Canadian Football League. After watching Fryer at a practice in September 1975 he passed a report on to Alouettes head coach Marv Levy. Levy, who was once an assistant with the Washington Redskins of the NFL, told Redskins head coach George Allen that Fryer was a player with NFL potential. Redskins director of player personnel Tim Temerario and director of college scouting Mark Allman paid visits to Alberta that winter to assess Fryer's abilities. As a result, the Redskins selected Fryer with the 234th pick in the eighth round of the NFL draft on April 8, 1976.

As an Edmonton-born and trained player, Fryer's CFL negotiating rights were held by the Edmonton Eskimos by territorial exemption, but the Redskins easily exceeded the Eskimos' top offer of around $100,000. On April 28 Fryer signed a three-year contract with Washington for $155,000, plus a $15,000 signing bonus and a new car, making him the first Canadian-born player trained at a Canadian university to be drafted, signed by an NFL club and make a team as a rookie.

Fryer was one of 34 rookies at the Redskins training camp that summer, but the only one who made the team. He caught seven passes for 110 yards and scored one touchdown in pre-season exhibition play and was slotted into the lineup as a special teams player. Fryer returned nine kickoffs for 166 yards in four NFL regular season games before strained ligaments in his knee ended his season. They were the only four NFL regular season games Fryer played. He spent the 1977 season rehabbing on the practice roster, before parting ways with the team in 1978.

=== Edmonton Eskimos ===
Fryer continued his pro career in the CFL with the Edmonton Eskimos in 1978. Fryer's contributions to the Eskimos' Grey Cup winning 1978 season were minimal; he played in nine of the team's 16 games and caught 20 passes for 293 yards and one touchdown.

Fryer appeared in only two games as the Eskimos won a second consecutive Grey Cup in 1979.

Injuries to receivers Smith and Scott allowed Fryer to become a more regular contributor to the Eskimos during the 1980 season. He appeared in 15 games and caught 23 passes for 408 yards and two touchdowns. In the post-season he caught four passes for 77 yards as Edmonton won its third consecutive Grey Cup, 48–10 over the Hamilton Tiger-Cats.

In 1981, the team went 14–1–1 and won their fourth Grey Cup in four years, but Fryer appeared in only one game all season, catching a single pass for 11 yards after being in a season-ending injury the first game of the season.

Fryer had 55 catches for 812 yards and a pair of touchdowns, and made four receptions for 55 yards in the Grey Cup game as the Eskimos won a record fifth consecutive championship in 1982.

Fryer had 46 receptions for 639 yards in 1983, and had 464 yards in 1984. He appeared in eight games for Edmonton in 1985.

=== Ottawa Rough Riders ===
Fyrer played in three games with Ottawa.

His CFL totals in 83 regular season games over eight years are 179 receptions, 2670 yards and seven touchdowns.

== After football ==
Since his retirement in 1985, Brian has been employed as the executive director of Football Alberta, administering all amateur football programs in the province. Since 1995, Brian is still an active member of the Edmonton Eskimo Alumni Association as a director, president and chair of Casino and Scholarship committees.

Fryer was announced for induction into the Canadian Football Hall of Fame on February 21, 2013, in recognition of his CIS playing career with the Alberta Golden Bears.

Fryer was inducted into the Alberta Schools Athletic Association Sports Hall of Fame in 2008 and inducted into the City of Edmonton's Sports Hall of Fame in 2005. As well he is inducted into the Alberta Sports Hall of Fame as part of the team awards for winning the Grey Cup five consecutive seasons (1978–1982).
