= 1978 Calgary Stampeders season =

Canadian football team season

- General manager: Jack Gotta
- Head coach: Jack Gotta
- Home stadium: McMahon Stadium

Results
- Record: 9–4–3
- Division place: 2nd, West
- Playoffs: Lost Western Final

The 1978 Calgary Stampeders finished in second place in the Western Conference with a 9–4–3 record. They appeared in the Western Final where they lost to the Edmonton Eskimos.

== Roster ==
1978 Calgary Stampeders final roster
Quarterbacks: 16 John Hufnagel; 19 Ken Johnson; 6 Craig Juntunen; Running backs: 10 Willie Burden; 12 Ronnie Rowland; 11 James Sykes; Wide receivers: 18 Willie Armstead; 22 Tom Forzani; 14 Kelvin Kirk; 21 Paul Pearson; Tight ends: 70 Bob Viccars	Offensive linemen: 66 Lloyd Fairbanks T; 57 Harry Horton G; 51 Tommy Humphrey T; 69 Dave Kirzinger G/T; 54 Bob Lubig G; 63 John Malinosky T; 61 Willie Thomas C/G; 46 Larry Tittley C; Defensive linemen: 74 Miles Gorrell DT; 77 John Helton DE; 47 Andy Jonassen DE; 60 Reggie Lewis DE; 64 Ed McAleney DT	Linebackers: 50 Ollie Bakken; 75 Blain Lamoureux; 72 Bernie Morrison; 31 John Palazeti FB; Defensive backs: 27 Al Burleson; 33 Doug Falconer; 7 Robin Harber; 28 Terry Irvin; 8 Rob Kochel; 32 Ray Odums; 24 Tom Reimer; Special teams: 20 Cyril McFall K/P	Injured List: 25 Matthew Reed QB; Italics indicate International player

== Regular season ==
=== Season standings ===
Western Football Conference
Team	GP	W	L	T	PF	PA	Pts
Edmonton Eskimos	16	10	4	2	452	301	22
Calgary Stampeders	16	9	4	3	381	311	21
Winnipeg Blue Bombers	16	9	7	0	371	351	18
BC Lions	16	7	7	2	359	308	16
Saskatchewan Roughriders	16	4	11	1	330	459	9

=== Season schedule ===
Week	Game	Date	Opponent	Results		Venue	Attendance
Week	Game	Date	Opponent	Score	Record	Venue	Attendance
	1		Edmonton Eskimos	L 17–33	0–1		
	2		BC Lions	W 23–21	1–1		
	3		BC Lions	T 19–19	1–1–1		
	4		Montreal Alouettes	L 14–28	1–2–1		
	5		Winnipeg Blue Bombers	W 29–21	2–2–1		
	6		Saskatchewan Roughriders	W 43–22	3–2–1		
	7		Ottawa Rough Riders	L 16–27	3–3–1		
	8		Edmonton Eskimos	T 28–28	3–3–2		
	9		BC Lions	W 14–4	4–3–2		
	10		Edmonton Eskimos	T 20–20	4–3–3		
	11		Saskatchewan Roughriders	L 19–20	4–4–3		
	12		Toronto Argonauts	W 22–16	5–4–3		
	13		Saskatchewan Roughriders	W 33–13	6–4–3		
	14		Hamilton Tiger-Cats	W 35–1	7–4–3		
	15		Winnipeg Blue Bombers	W 28–24	8–4–3		
	16		Winnipeg Blue Bombers	W 22–14	9–4–3		

== Playoffs ==
=== West Semi-Final ===
Team	Q1	Q2	Q3	Q4	Total
Winnipeg Blue Bombers	0	4	0	0	4
Calgary Stampeders	10	7	7	14	38

=== West Final ===
Team	Q1	Q2	Q3	Q4	Total
Calgary Stampeders	3	7	3	0	13
Edmonton Eskimos	3	7	0	16	26

== Awards and records ==
- CFL's Coach of the Year – Jack Gotta

=== 1978 CFL All-Stars ===
- RB – James Sykes, CFL All-Star
- OG – Harold Holton, CFL All-Star
- DT – John Helton, CFL All-Star
- DE – Reggie Lewis, CFL All-Star
