= 3rd Vanier Cup =

1967 Canadian university football championship

Alberta Golden Bears	McMaster Marauders
(6–1)	(7–0)
10	9
Head coach: Clare Drake	Head coach: Jack Kennedy
	1	2	3	4	Total
Alberta Golden Bears	0	0	0	10	10
McMaster Marauders	0	0	0	9	9
- Date: November 25, 1967
- Stadium: Varsity Stadium
- Location: Toronto
- Ted Morris Memorial Trophy: Val Schneider, Alberta
- Attendance: 16,167

The 3rd Vanier Cup was played on November 25, 1967, at Varsity Stadium in Toronto, Ontario, and decided the CIAU football champion for the 1967 season. The Alberta Golden Bears won their first ever championship by defeating the McMaster Marauders by a score of 10–9. This was the first national championship that required semi-final playoffs to determine the two teams that would meet in the Vanier Cup game. This also now represented the CIAU (now U Sports) National Football Championship, whereas before it was solely a national invitational event under no defined league.
