= Bernie Morrison =

Canadian football player (born 1955)

Profile
- Position: Linebacker

Personal information
- Born: March 25, 1955 (age 71); Winnipeg, Manitoba
- Listed height: 6 ft 1 in (1.85 m)
- Listed weight: 215 lb (98 kg)

Career information
- University: Manitoba Bisons
- CFL draft: 1978 Territorial Pick Winnipeg Blue Bombers

Career history
- 1978–1988: Calgary Stampeders

Awards and highlights
- Calgary Stampeders President Ring 1985 & 1987 / Calgary Stampeders Nominee for Schenly Award for Top Canadian 1983 & 1985 / Calgary Stampeders 50 year Dream Team / Calgary Stampeders Wall of Fame 2010 / Calgary Stampeders Ranked #8 of All Time Players

Bernie Morrison (born March 25, 1955) is a Canadian former professional football linebacker who played eleven seasons for the Calgary Stampeders of the Canadian Football League. Manitoba Bisons 1975-1977 / Bisons Rookie of the Year 1975 / Bisons Outstanding Lineman 1976 / Western Intercollegiate All Star 1976 & 1977 / CIAU All Canadian 1977 / CAN-AM Bowl 1978 / Jr Football Winnipeg Rods 1974 / Juvenile Football St Vital Mustangs 1972-1973 / Transcona Nationals 1971
