= Bart Evans (Canadian football) =

Canadian football player (born 1952)

Profile
- Positions: Guard, Offensive lineman

Personal information
- Born: September 9, 1952 (age 74); Winnipeg, Manitoba, Canada
- Listed height: 6 ft 2 in (1.88 m)
- Listed weight: 240 lb (109 kg)

Career information
- University: Manitoba
- CFL draft: 1973: 8th round, 66th overall pick

Career history
- 1976–1979: Hamilton Tiger-Cats
- 1979: Winnipeg Blue Bombers

Awards and highlights
- J. P. Metras Trophy (1974)

Bart Evans (born September 9, 1952) is a Canadian former professional football player who played for the Hamilton Tiger-Cats and Winnipeg Blue Bombers.

Evans was born in Winnipeg and played university football at the University of Manitoba from 1972 to 1974. He was drafted 66th overall by the Winnipeg Blue Bombers in the 8th round of the 1973 CFL draft. Evans was recruited by the Montreal Alouettes of the Canadian Football League in 1974, but after being one of the final roster cuts, he returned to university to take a post-graduate course. In the ensuing football season he was the inaugural winner of the J. P. Metras Trophy in 1974 as the best lineman in Canadian university football.

Evans begun his CFL career with the Montreal Alouettes in 1976 as a backup offensive lineman, but did not appear in any games with them before being traded in a multi-player deal to the Hamilton Tiger-Cats which included all-star running back Andy Hopkins. He played four seasons with Hamilton before being traded in September 1979 to the Winnipeg Blue Bombers, his hometown team, in exchange for Linden Davidson. In March 1980, Evans was traded to the Toronto Argonauts in exchange for Ecomet Burley, but did not report to the team after they refused to renegotiate his salary, and opted to retire from football.

Outside of sports, Evans worked at a bank and later in the financial sector.
