= Jim Donlevy =

Canadian football coach (1937–2019)

Biographical details
- Born: April 16, 1937; McLennan, Alberta, Canada
- Died: August 4, 2019 (aged 82); Calgary, Alberta, Canada

Coaching career (HC unless noted)
- 1971–1980: Alberta
- 1984–1990: Alberta

Head coaching record
- Overall: 86–69–3

James Garvey Donlevy (April 16, 1937 – August 4, 2019) was a Canadian football coach. He coached the Alberta Golden Bears of the University of Alberta from 1971 to 1981 and 1984 to his resignation in 1990, amassing a record of 86–69–3 and winning the Vanier Cup championship in 1972 and 1980. The Bears appeared in the College Bowl in 1971, 1972, 1980, and 1981 with Donlevy coaching. He later worked for the Western Hockey League as an educational consultant. He was born in McLennan, Alberta and attended St. Joseph High School in Edmonton. He was a teacher with Edmonton Catholic Schools before joining the University of Alberta in 1970. Donlevy died of cancer at the age of 82 on August 4, 2019, in Calgary, Alberta.
