= 1979 Edmonton Eskimos season =

Canadian football team season

- General manager: Norm Kimball
- Head coach: Hugh Campbell
- Home stadium: Commonwealth Stadium

Results
- Record: 12–2–2
- Division place: 1st, West
- Playoffs: Won Grey Cup

Uniform

The 1979 Edmonton Eskimos finished in first place in the Western Conference with a 12–2–2 record and repeated as Grey Cup champions after winning the 67th Grey Cup.

== Pre-season ==
=== Schedule ===
Game	Date	Opponent	Results		Venue	Attendance
Game	Date	Opponent	Score	Record	Venue	Attendance
A	June 12	vs. BC Lions	L 27–32	0–1	Commonwealth Stadium	41,326
B	June 19	at Toronto Argonauts	W 31–16	1–1	Exhibition Stadium	35,742
B	June 24	vs. Ottawa Rough Riders	L 27–30	1–2	Commonwealth Stadium	41,379*
C	June 29	at Saskatchewan Roughriders	W 53–20	2–2	Taylor Field	17,460

*Top preseason attendance of season

== Regular season ==
=== Season standings ===
Western Football Conference
Team	GP	W	L	T	PF	PA	Pts
Edmonton Eskimos	16	12	2	2	495	219	26
Calgary Stampeders	16	12	4	0	382	278	24
BC Lions	16	9	6	1	328	333	19
Winnipeg Blue Bombers	16	4	12	0	283	340	8
Saskatchewan Roughriders	16	2	14	0	194	437	4

=== Season schedule ===
Week	Game	Date	Opponent	Results		Venue	Attendance
Week	Game	Date	Opponent	Score	Record	Venue	Attendance
1	1	July 10	at Winnipeg Blue Bombers	W 28–10	1–0		24,024
2	2	July 17	vs. Saskatchewan Roughriders	W 52–20	2–0		43,321
3	Bye						
4	3	July 31	vs. Calgary Stampeders	W 44–9	3–0		42,887
5	4	Aug 7	at BC Lions	T 14–14	3–0–1		30,137
6	5	Aug 14	at Ottawa Rough Riders	T 24–24	3–0–2		27,050
7	6	Aug 21	vs. Winnipeg Blue Bombers	W 41–13	4–0–2		42,778
8	7	Aug 28	vs. Toronto Argonauts	W 28–13	5–0–2		42,778
8	8	Sept 3	at Calgary Stampeders	W 27–1	6–0–2		34,825
9	9	Sept 9	vs. Saskatchewan Roughriders	W 40–0	7–0–2		40,231
10	10	Sept 16	vs. BC Lions	W 40–8	8–0–2		42,776
11	11	Sept 23	at Hamilton Tiger-Cats	W 22–21	9–0–2		18,186
12	12	Sept 30	at Calgary Stampeders	L 19–26	9–1–2		33,245
13	13	Oct 8	vs. Montreal Alouettes	W 47–6	10–1–2		42,778
14	14	Oct 14	at Saskatchewan Roughriders	L 25–26	10–2–2		20,042
15	Bye						
16	15	Oct 28	vs. Winnipeg Blue Bombers	W 19–11	11–2–2		42,778
17	16	Nov 3	at BC Lions	W 25–17	12–2–2		26,575

Total attendance: 340,327
Average attendance: 42,541 (99.4%)

== Playoffs ==
Round	Date	Opponent	Results		Venue	Attendance
Round	Date	Opponent	Score	Record	Venue	Attendance
Division Final	Nov 18	vs. Calgary Stampeders	W 19–7	1–0	Commonwealth Stadium	43,033*
Grey Cup	Nov 25	at Montreal Alouettes	W 17–9	2–0	Olympic Stadium	65,113

*Top playoff attendance of season

=== Grey Cup ===
Teams	1 Q	2 Q	3 Q	4 Q	Final
Edmonton Eskimos	7	0	10	0	17
Montreal Alouettes	3	3	3	0	9

== Roster ==
1979 Edmonton Eskimos final roster
**Quarterbacks**: 1 Warren Moon; 12 Tom Wilkinson; **Running backs**: 25 Jim Germany; 23 Angelo Santucci; 21 Don Warrington; **Wide receivers**: 77 Brian Fryer; 70 Brian Kelly; 72 John Konihowski; 15 Stu Lang; 22 Tom Scott; **Tight ends**: 71 Waddell Smith	**Offensive linemen**: 59 Leo Blanchard G/T; 53 Bob Howes C; 56 Ted Milian G/C; 63 Hector Pothier T/G; 62 Bill Stevenson T; 57 Eric Upton G; 67 Mike Wilson T; **Defensive linemen**: 64 David Boone DE; 55 Ron Estay DE; 65 Dave Fennell DT; 69 York Hentschel DT; 61 Jimmy Walker DT/DE	**Linebackers**: 42 Danny Kepley; 30 Dale Potter; 20 Tom Towns; 45 Dave Zacharko; **Defensive backs**: 28 Gregg Butler; 37 Emilio Fraietta; 13 Larry Highbaugh; 29 Joe Hollimon; 24 Ed Jones; 7 Pete Lavorato; **Special teams**: 26 Dave Cutler K; 8 Hank Ilesic P; Italics indicate American player. **Bold** indicates Global player

== Awards and honours ==
- Annis Stukus Trophy – Hugh Campbell
- CFL's Most Outstanding Canadian Award – Dave "Dr. Death" Fennell
- CFL's Most Outstanding Offensive Lineman Award – Mike Wilson (OT)
- CFL's Most Outstanding Rookie Award – Brian Kelly (WR)
- Dr. Beattie Martin Trophy – Dave Fennell
