= 1979 Montreal Alouettes season =

Canadian football team season

- Head coach: Joe Scannella
- Home stadium: Olympic Stadium

Results
- Record: 11–4–1
- Division place: 1st, East
- Playoffs: Lost Grey Cup

Uniform

The 1979 Montreal Alouettes finished the season in first place in the Eastern Conference with an 11–4–1 record and appeared in the 67th Grey Cup. The Alouettes would lose the championship game to the Edmonton Eskimos for the second consecutive year.

== Preseason ==
Game	Date	Opponent	Results		Venue	Attendance
Game	Date	Opponent	Score	Record	Venue	Attendance
A	June 12	vs. Ottawa Rough Riders	W 36–20	1–0	Olympic Stadium	24,290
B	June 20	at Saskatchewan Roughriders	W 19–7	2–0	Taylor Field	18,349
C	June 27	at Toronto Argonauts	W 30–18	3–0	Exhibition Stadium	35,230
D	July 3	vs. Hamilton Tiger-Cats	W 21–8	4–0	Olympic Stadium	27,637

== Regular season ==
=== Standings ===
Eastern Football Conference
Team	GP	W	L	T	PF	PA	Pts
Montreal Alouettes	16	11	4	1	351	284	23
Ottawa Rough Riders	16	8	6	2	349	315	18
Hamilton Tiger-Cats	16	6	10	0	280	338	12
Toronto Argonauts	16	5	11	0	234	352	10

=== Schedule ===
Week	Game	Date	Opponent	Results		Venue	Attendance
Week	Game	Date	Opponent	Score	Record	Venue	Attendance
1	1	July 10	at Toronto Argonauts	W 11–9	1–0	Exhibition Stadium	42,108
2	2	July 17	at BC Lions	L 10–25	1–1	Empire Stadium	51,237
3	3	July 25	vs. Calgary Stampeders	L 7–19	1–2	Olympic Stadium	51,237
4	4	Aug 1	at Hamilton Tiger-Cats	W 21–8	2–2	Ivor Wynne Stadium	41,232
5	5	Aug 7	vs. Winnipeg Blue Bombers	W 25–10	3–2	Olympic Stadium	41,232
6	Bye						
7	6	Aug 20	vs. Ottawa Rough Riders	W 32–14	4–2	Olympic Stadium	51,487
8	7	Aug 29	at Ottawa Rough Riders	L 29–31	4–3	Lansdowne Park	31,672
9	8	Sept 4	at Toronto Argonauts	W 28–25	5–3	Exhibition Stadium	45,202
10	9	Sept 9	vs. Toronto Argonauts	W 31–11	6–3	Olympic Stadium	51,203
11	10	Sept 16	at Hamilton Tiger-Cats	W 21–14	7–3	Ivor Wynne Stadium	18,511
12	11	Sept 23	vs. Saskatchewan Roughriders	W 11–3	8–3	Olympic Stadium	35,240
13	12	Sept 30	at Ottawa Rough Riders	T 29–29	8–3–1	Lansdowne Park	32,669
14	13	Oct 8	at Edmonton Eskimos	L 6–47	8–4–1	Commonwealth Stadium	42,778
15	Bye						
16	14	Oct 20	vs. Toronto Argonauts	W 25–11	9–4–1	Olympic Stadium	37,690
17	15	Oct 27	vs. Ottawa Rough Riders	W 24–8	10–4–1	Olympic Stadium	47,368
18	16	Nov 4	vs. Hamilton Tiger-Cats	W 41–20	11–4–1	Olympic Stadium	41,382

== Postseason ==
Round	Date	Opponent	Results		Venue	Attendance
Round	Date	Opponent	Score	Record	Venue	Attendance
East Final	Nov 17	vs. Ottawa Rough Riders	W 17–6	1–0	Olympic Stadium	35,103
Grey Cup	Nov 25	vs. Edmonton Eskimos	L 9–17	1–1	Olympic Stadium	65,113

=== Grey Cup ===
Team	Q1	Q2	Q3	Q4	Total
Edmonton Eskimos	7	0	10	0	17
Montreal Alouettes	3	3	3	0	9

Montreal's star running back David Green became the fifth Alouette to be named Most Outstanding Player. He led the league in rushing with 1678 yards on 287 carries.

== Roster ==
1979 Montreal Alouettes final roster
**Quarterbacks**: 7 Joe Barnes; 17 Ron Calcagni; 9 Gerry Dattilio; **Running backs**: 26 David Green; 33 Chuck McMann; 30 John O'Leary; 36 Larry Smith; **Wide receivers**: 12 Keith Baker; 22 Bob Gaddis; **Tight ends**: 79 Nick Arakgi; 74 Peter Dalla Riva	**Offensive linemen**: 44 Mike Hameluck C/G; 58 Roland Mangold G; 61 Doug Payton T/G; 66 Larry Pfohl T; 53 Doug Smith C; 52 Ray Watrin G; 67 Dan Yochum T; **Defensive linemen**: 77 Junior Ah You DE; 76 Gabriel Grégoire DE; 75 Gord Judges DT; 68 Tony Petruccio DT/DE; 59 Ed Szpytma DE; 64 Glen Weir DT	**Linebackers**: 39 Wally Buono P; 45 Tom Cousineau; 47 Jerry Friesen; 62 Bill Hampton; **Defensive backs**: 16 Jim Burrow; 18 Dickie Harris; 32 Bobby Hosea; 15 Jim Marshall; 23 Tony Proudfoot; 21 Randy Rhino; 8 Larry Uteck; **Special teams**: 11 Don Sweet K/P; Italics indicate American players **Bold** indicates Global player
