= 1979 Ottawa Rough Riders season =

Canadian football team season

- Owner: Allan Waters
- General manager: Jake Dunlap
- Head coach: George Brancato
- Home stadium: Lansdowne Park

Results
- Record: 8–6–2
- Division place: 2nd, East
- Playoffs: Lost Eastern Final

Uniform

The 1979 Ottawa Rough Riders finished in second place in the Eastern Conference with an 8–6–2 record. Prior to the 2015 season, the 1979 season was the last time that an Ottawa-based CFL team had a winning season.

In May 1979, Tom Clements was traded to the Saskatchewan Roughriders. The Clements-Holloway quarterback combination would be no more. From 1975–78, under Holloway and Clements, the Rough Riders compiled a 38–24–2 record, which included two Eastern Division championships and a Grey Cup win in 1976 over Saskatchewan. This lent to the credence of the "two number-ones" stratagem and both quarterbacks' team-first attitude.

== Preseason ==
Game	Date	Opponent	Results		Venue	Attendance
Game	Date	Opponent	Score	Record	Venue	Attendance
A	June 12	at Montreal Alouettes	L 20–36	0–1		
B	June 18	vs. Winnipeg Blue Bombers	W 13–12	1–1		
C	June 24	at Edmonton Eskimos	W 30–27	2–1		
D	July 4	vs. Toronto Argonauts	L 13–18	2–2		

== Regular season ==
=== Standings ===
Eastern Football Conference
Team	GP	W	L	T	PF	PA	Pts
Montreal Alouettes	16	11	4	1	351	284	23
Ottawa Rough Riders	16	8	6	2	349	315	18
Hamilton Tiger-Cats	16	6	10	0	280	338	12
Toronto Argonauts	16	5	11	0	234	352	10

=== Schedule ===
Week	Game	Date	Opponent	Results		Venue	Attendance
Week	Game	Date	Opponent	Score	Record	Venue	Attendance
1	1	July 11	vs. Hamilton Tiger-Cats	W 30–19	1–0		
2	2	July 24	at Toronto Argonauts	W 31–2	2–0		
3	3	July 31	vs. Toronto Argonauts	L 16–18	2–1		
4	4	Aug 8	at Calgary Stampeders	L 17–27	2–2		
5	5	Aug 14	vs. Edmonton Eskimos	T 24–24	2–2–1		
6	6	Aug 20	at Montreal Alouettes	L 14–32	2–3–1		
7	7	Aug 29	vs. Montreal Alouettes	W 31–29	3–3–1		
8	8	Sept 3	at Hamilton Tiger-Cats	L 9–16	3–4–1		
9	9	Sept 8	vs. Hamilton Tiger-Cats	W 44–4	4–4–1		
10	10	Sept 15	at Winnipeg Blue Bombers	W 22–19	5–4–1		
11	11	Sept 30	vs. Montreal Alouettes	T 29–29	5–4–2		
12	12	Oct 7	at Saskatchewan Roughriders	W 20–19	6–4–2		
13	13	Oct 14	vs. BC Lions	W 28–26	7–4–2		
14	14	Oct 21	at Hamilton Tiger-Cats	L 3–21	7–5–2		
15	15	Oct 27	at Montreal Alouettes	L 8–24	7–6–2		
16	16	Nov 3	vs. Toronto Argonauts	W 23–6	8–6–2		

== Postseason ==
Round	Date	Opponent	Results		Venue	Attendance
Round	Date	Opponent	Score	Record	Venue	Attendance
East Semi-Final	Nov 11	vs. Hamilton Tiger-Cats	W 29–26	9–6–2		
East Final	Nov 17	at Montreal Alouettes	L 6–17	9–7–2		

== Player stats ==
=== Passing ===
Player	Attempts	Completions	Completions	Percentage	Yards	Touchdowns	Interceptions
Condredge Holloway	238	128	53.8	1965	17	8	

=== Receiving ===
Player	Games Played	Receptions	Yards	Average	Long	Touchdowns
Jeff Avery	15	27	402	14.9	53	4
Tony Gabriel	16	48	761	15.9	44	8

== Awards and honours ==
- Ron Foxx, Linebacker, CFL All-Star
- Tony Gabriel, Tight End, CFL All-Star

== Roster ==
1979 Ottawa Rough Riders final roster
Quarterbacks: 7 Condredge Holloway; 8 Jimmy Jones; 9 Charlie Weatherbie; Running backs: 33 Richard Crump; 6 Emmett King; 13 Ian Mofford; 30 Mike Murphy; Wide receivers: 18 Jeff Avery; 24 Ross Clarkson; 23 Pete Stenerson DB; 14 Pat Stoqua; 1 Bruce Walker	Tight ends: 77 Tony Gabriel; Offensive linemen: 55 Val Belcher G; 60 Jim Coode T; 51 Ray Honey T; 59 Malcolm Inglis T; 58 Doug McGee G; 65 Wes Phillips T; 64 Donn Smith C; Defensive linemen: 68 Mike Fanucci DE; 53 Brian Hedges DT; 73 Jim Piaskoski DE; 79 Mike Raines DT	Linebackers: 41 Tim Berryman; 42 Brad Carr; 78 Ron Foxx; 76 John Glassford; 57 Ray Nettles; 75 Rick Sowieta; Defensive backs: 21 Larry Brune; 10 Peter Crepin; 19 Kenny Downing; 22 Mike Nelms; 34 John Sutton; Special teams: 71 Gerry Organ K/P	Injured list: 2 Martin Cox WR; Italics indicate International player
