= Steve Ackroyd =

Canadian football player

No. 26
- Positions: Safety, Wide receiver

Personal information
- Born: June 5, 1956 (age 70)
- Listed height: 6 ft 1 in (1.85 m)
- Listed weight: 175 lb (79 kg)

Career information
- College: Sheridan College

Career history
- 1978: Toronto Argonauts
- 1978–1979: Hamilton Tiger-Cats
- 1979–1984: Toronto Argonauts

Awards and highlights
- Grey Cup champion (1983)

Steven Ackroyd (born June 5, 1956) is a Canadian former professional football safety and wide receiver for the Toronto Argonauts and Hamilton Tiger-Cats of the Canadian Football League (CFL). In 1983, he won the 71st Grey Cup with the Argonauts.

== Season statistics ==
			Receiving					Punt returns					Kick returns					Fumbles		Defense		
Year	Team	GP	Catches	Yards	Avg	Long	TD	PR	Yards	Avg	Long	TD	KR	Yards	Avg	Long	TD	FUM	FR	INT	Yards	TD
1978	TOR	2	0	0	0	0	0	0	0	0	0	0	0	0	0	0	0	0	0	0	0	0
1978	HAM	2	0	0	0	0	0	7	52	7.4	13	0	1	10	10.0	10	0	0	0	0	0	0
1979	HAM	5	1	9	9.0	9	0	0	0	0	0	0	0	0	0	0	0	0	0	0	0	0
1979	TOR	5	0	0	0	0	0	0	0	0	0	0	0	0	0	0	0	0	0	1	18	0
1980	TOR	3	0	0	0	0	0	0	0	0	0	0	0	0	0	0	0	0	0	0	0	0
1981	TOR	12	0	0	0	0	0	0	0	0	0	0	0	0	0	0	0	0	1	0	0	0
1982	TOR	16	0	0	0	0	0	1	3	3.0	3	0	0	0	0	0	0	0	1	3	38	1
1983	TOR	16	0	0	0	0	0	3	16	5.3	21	0	0	0	0	0	0	0	1	2	0	0
1984	TOR	16	0	0	0	0	0	1	15	15.0	15	0	0	0	0	0	0	0	1	0	0	0
Total		77	1	9	9.0	9	0	12	86	7.2	21	0	1	10	10.0	10	0	0	4	6	56	1
