= 1979 Winnipeg Blue Bombers season =

Canadian football team season

- General manager: Earl Lunsford
- Head coach: Ray Jauch
- Home stadium: Winnipeg Stadium

Results
- Record: 4–12
- Division place: 4th, West
- Playoffs: did not qualify

The 1979 Winnipeg Blue Bombers finished in fourth place in the Western Conference with a 4–12 record and failed to make the playoffs.

== Offseason ==
=== CFL draft ===
Round	Pick	Player	Position	School
T	T	Rick Chernoff	TE	Manitoba
T	T	Bill Yaworsky	DE	Manitoba
1	5	Rick House	TB	Simon Fraser
2	14	Jim Dziedzina	TE	Simon Fraser
3	22	Walt Passaglia	WR	Simon Fraser
3	23	Doug Biggerstaff	DE	British Columbia
4	31	Chris Brewer	DE	Acadia
4	32	Jim McHugh	LB	McMaster
5	41	Bob McEachern	LB	Weber State
6	50	Gerry Hatherly	LB	Manitoba
7	59	Barry Safinuik	TB	Manitoba

== Roster ==
1979 Winnipeg Blue Bombers final roster
Quarterbacks: 5 Dieter Brock; 6 Bill Troup; Running backs: 39 Richard Holmes; 35 John McCorquindale; 27 Jim Washington; 7 Larry Washington; Wide receivers: 28 Brian Gervais; 70 Mike Holmes; 31 Rick House; 78 Les Huggins; 77 Bob O'Doherty; 24 Walt Passaglia; Tight ends: 79 Tennie Pierce	Offensive linemen: 43 John Bonk C; 54 Bart Evans G; 48 Gerry Inglis C/G; 67 John Malinosky T; 66 Butch Norman T; 61 Bobby Thompson T/G; 60 Charlie Turner G; Defensive linemen: 58 Marv Allemang DE; 99 John Helton DE/DT; 73 Billy Howard DT; 56 Leon Lyszkiewicz DT; 76 Gary Silvestri DE; Special teams: 10 Bernie Ruoff K/P	Linebackers: 72 Leo Ezerins; 53 John Martini; 57 James Reed; 52 Tom Schultz; 32 Bob Toogood; Defensive backs: 22 Steve Gelley; 25 Harry Kruger; 9 Vince Phason; 8 Reggie Pierson; 21 Gary Rozolowich; 26 Ricky Wesson; 20 Charles Williams; Injured list: 71 Joe Poplawski WR; 33 Ed Preston DB; Italics indicate International player

== Preseason ==
Game	Date	Opponent	Results		Venue	Attendance
Game	Date	Opponent	Score	Record	Venue	Attendance
A	Sun, June 10	vs. Calgary Stampeders	L 13–35	0–1	Winnipeg Stadium	21,584
B	Mon, June 18	at Ottawa Rough Riders	L 12–13	0–2	Lansdowne Park	18,870
C	Tue, June 26	at BC Lions	L 6–12	0–3	Empire Stadium	17,511
D	Wed, July 4	vs. Saskatchewan Roughriders	W 16–10	1–3	Winnipeg Stadium	21,501

== Regular season ==
=== Standings ===
Western Football Conference
Team	GP	W	L	T	PF	PA	Pts
Edmonton Eskimos	16	12	2	2	495	219	26
Calgary Stampeders	16	12	4	0	382	278	24
BC Lions	16	9	6	1	328	333	19
Winnipeg Blue Bombers	16	4	12	0	283	340	8
Saskatchewan Roughriders	16	2	14	0	194	437	4

=== Schedule ===
Week	Game	Date	Opponent	Results		Venue	Attendance
Week	Game	Date	Opponent	Score	Record	Venue	Attendance
1	1	Tue, July 10	vs. Edmonton Eskimos	L 10–28	0–1	Winnipeg Stadium	24,024
2	2	Wed, July 18	at Calgary Stampeders	L 7–35	0–2	McMahon Stadium	33,196
3	3	Tue, July 24	vs. BC Lions	L 18–19	0–3	Empire Stadium	24,727
4	Bye						
5	4	Tue, Aug 7	at Montreal Alouettes	L 10–25	0–4	Olympic Stadium	41,232
6	5	Tue, Aug 14	vs. Hamilton Tiger-Cats	W 27–21	1–4	Winnipeg Stadium	24,660
7	6	Tue, Aug 21	at Edmonton Eskimos	L 13–41	1–5	Commonwealth Stadium	42,778
8	7	Tue, Aug 28	vs. Saskatchewan Roughriders	W 30–1	2–5	Winnipeg Stadium	25,159
8	8	Mon, Sept 3	at Saskatchewan Roughriders	W 28–11	3–5	Taylor Field	22,190
9	9	Sun, Sept 9	vs. BC Lions	L 15–17	3–6	Winnipeg Stadium	27,203
10	10	Sat, Sept 15	vs. Ottawa Rough Riders	L 19–22	3–7	Winnipeg Stadium	25,644
11	11	Sun, Sept 23	at Calgary Stampeders	L 23–28	3–8	McMahon Stadium	30,125
12	12	Sat, Sept 29	at BC Lions	L 21–22	3–9	Empire Stadium	23,964
13	13	Mon, Oct 8	vs. Calgary Stampeders	L 13–18	3–10	Winnipeg Stadium	22,429
14	14	Sat, Oct 13	at Toronto Argonauts	L 15–19	3–11	Exhibition Stadium	35,106
15	15	Sun, Oct 21	vs. Saskatchewan Roughriders	W 23–14	4–11	Winnipeg Stadium	23,032
16	16	Sun, Oct 28	at Edmonton Eskimos	L 11–19	4–12	Commonwealth Stadium	42,778

== Awards and honors ==
- CFLPA's Most Outstanding Community Service Award – John Helton (DT)

=== CFL All-Stars ===
- DT – John Helton
