= 1979 Toronto Argonauts season =

CFL team season

- Owner: Carling O'Keefe
- General manager: Tommy Hudspeth
- Head coach: Forrest Gregg
- Home stadium: Exhibition Stadium

Results
- Record: 5–11
- Division place: 4th, East
- Playoffs: did not qualify

Uniform

The 1979 Toronto Argonauts finished in fourth place in the Eastern Conference with a 5–11 record and failed to make the playoffs.

== Offseason ==
=== CFL draft ===
The Toronto Argonauts drafted the following players in the 1979 CFL draft.

Round	Pick	Player	Position	School
T	T	Mike McTague	Wide receiver	North Dakota State
1	1	Kevin Powell	Tackle	Utah State
2	10	Dan Huculak	Tailback	Simon Fraser
4	28	Brent Racette	Defensive end	British Columbia
5	37	Mark Forsyth	Defensive back	Wilfrid Laurier
6	46	Peter Racey	Tackle	Simon Fraser
7	55	John Goodrow	Tailback	Toronto

== Regular season ==
=== Standings ===
Eastern Football Conference
Team	GP	W	L	T	PF	PA	Pts
Montreal Alouettes	16	11	4	1	351	284	23
Ottawa Rough Riders	16	8	6	2	349	315	18
Hamilton Tiger-Cats	16	6	10	0	280	338	12
Toronto Argonauts	16	5	11	0	234	352	10

=== Schedule ===
Week	Game	Date	Opponent	Results		Venue	Attendance
Week	Game	Date	Opponent	Score	Record	Venue	Attendance
1	1	July 10	vs. Montreal Alouettes	L 9–11	0–1	Exhibition Stadium	42,108
2	2	July 18	at Hamilton Tiger-Cats	W 18–11	1–1	Ivor Wynne Stadium	25,109
3	3	July 24	vs. Ottawa Rough Riders	L 2–31	1–2	Exhibition Stadium	42,160
4	4	July 31	at Ottawa Rough Riders	W 18–16	2–2	Landsdowne Park	27,034
5	5	Aug 8	vs. Hamilton Tiger-Cats	W 25–0	3–2	Exhibition Stadium	41,282
6	6	Aug 15	vs. Saskatchewan Roughriders	W 21–12	4–2	Exhibition Stadium	41,251
7	Bye						
8	7	Aug 28	at Edmonton Eskimos	L 13–28	4–3	Commonwealth Stadium	42,778
9	8	Sept 4	vs. Montreal Alouettes	L 25–28	4–4	Exhibition Stadium	45,202
9	9	Sept 9	at Montreal Alouettes	L 11–31	4–5	Olympic Stadium	51,203
10	Bye						
11	10	Sept 22	at BC Lions	L 25–34	4–6	Empire Stadium	25,819
12	11	Sept 29	vs. Hamilton Tiger-Cats	L 16–17	4–7	Exhibition Stadium	37,023
13	12	Oct 8	at Hamilton Tiger-Cats	L 3–42	4–8	Ivor Wynne Stadium	27,293
14	13	Oct 13	vs. Winnipeg Blue Bombers	W 19–15	5–8	Exhibition Stadium	35,106
15	14	Oct 20	at Montreal Alouettes	L 11–25	5–9	Olympic Stadium	37,690
16	15	Oct 28	vs. Calgary Stampeders	L 12–28	5–10	Exhibition Stadium	36,226
17	16	Nov 3	at Ottawa Rough Riders	L 6–23	5–11	Landsdowne Park	21,490

== Roster ==
1979 Toronto Argonauts final roster
Quarterbacks: 11 Tony Adams; 8 Mark Jackson; Running backs: 24 Mark Bragagnolo; 32 David Green; 23 Jerome Heavens; 39 Dan Huclack; 27 Mike McArthur; 21 Terry Metcalf; Wide receivers: 6 Al Chester; 33 Dwight Edwards; 25 Paul Pearson	Tight ends: 7 M. L. Harris; 72 Peter Muller; Offensive linemen: 65 Nick Bastaja G; 56 John Foubert T; 58 Bruce Kimball G; 69 Bill Norton G; 51 Mike Obrovac T; 50 Kevin Powell T; 68 Doug Redl C; Defensive linemen: 62 Ecomet Burley DT; 79 Jim Corrigall DE; 66 Dennis Johnson DE; 61 Bruce Smith DT/DE	Linebackers: 35 Rich Lewis; 53 Rick Razzano; 71 Ron Southwick; 13 Frank Stephens; Defensive backs: 26 Steve Ackroyd; 20 Paul Bennett; 30 Billy Hardee; 16 Eric Harris; 19 Mike Kramer; 14 Mike Williams; 28 Preston Young; Special teams: 9 Ian Sunter K/P; Italics indicate International player
