= 1977 CFL draft =

Canadian football draft

The 1977 CFL draft composed of 10 rounds where 106 Canadian football players were chosen from eligible Canadian universities and Canadian players playing in the NCAA. A total of 18 players were selected as territorial exemptions, with the Montreal Alouettes being the only team to make no picks during this stage of the draft. Through a trade with the Calgary Stampeders, the Ottawa Rough Riders selected first overall in the draft.

== Territorial exemptions ==
Calgary Stampeders Lawrence Harrison G University of Calgary

Calgary Stampeders Larry Leathem WR Calgary

Calgary Stampeders John Malinosky OT Michigan State

Toronto Argonauts Paul Bennett DT Wilfrid Laurier

Toronto Argonauts Mark Bragagnolo TB University of Toronto

British Columbia Lions John Blain OT San Jose State

Winnipeg Blue Bombers Gary Rosolowich DB Boise State

Winnipeg Blue Bombers Lyall Woznesensky DE Simon Fraser

Edmonton Eskimos Leon Lyszkiewicz DT University of Alberta

Edmonton Eskimos Dave Salloum OT Alberta

Hamilton Tiger-Cats John Kinch TB Youngstown State

Hamilton Tiger-Cats Daniel Bovair DB Wilfrid Laurier

Saskatchewan Roughriders Lorne Hubick TB Eastern Illinois

Saskatchewan Roughriders Preston Young DB Simon Fraser

Ottawa Rough Riders Mike Murphy TB University of Ottawa

Ottawa Rough Riders Doug McGee G Richmond

Ottawa Rough Riders Dan Fournier WR Princeton

Ottawa Rough Riders Brian McLaughlin OT Simon Fraser

== 1st round ==
= CFL Division All-Star	= CFL All-Star	= Hall of Famer

Pick #	CFL team	Player	Position	College
1	Ottawa Rough Riders	Mike Riley	DT	Dalhousie
2	Toronto Argonauts	Rick Sowieta	LB	Richmond
3	Saskatchewan Roughriders	Emil Neilson	DB	Simon Fraser
4	Winnipeg Blue Bombers	Ray Honey	OT	Drake
5	Montreal Alouettes	Craig Thomson	LB	Ottawa
6	Edmonton Eskimos	Bob Cameron	QB	Acadia
7	Edmonton Eskimos	Tom Chad	DB	Saskatchewan
8	Hamilton Tiger-Cats	John Martini	LB	Toronto
9	Ottawa Rough Riders	Kirk DeFazio	DB	Waterloo

== 2nd round ==
10. British Columbia Lions Robin Adair WR Saskatchewan

11. Toronto Argonauts Cliff Pelham DB Dalhousie

12. British Columbia Lions Doug Seymour DT Missouri

13. Saskatchewan Roughriders John Nelson FB University of Manitoba

14. Montreal Alouettes Hector Pothier DT Saint Mary's University (Halifax)

15. Edmonton Eskimos J.P. Brescacin TE University of North Dakota

16. Hamilton Tiger-Cats John Rothwell DB Waterloo

17. Saskatchewan Roughriders Roger Adams TE University of Windsor

18. Ottawa Rough Riders Jim Lynn T Windsor

== 3rd round ==
19. Calgary Stampeders Robin Harber DB Ottawa

20. Toronto Argonauts Al MacLean G Bishop's University

21. British Columbia Lions Mike Moore DE University of British Columbia

22. Winnipeg Blue Bombers Duncan MacKinlay LB University of Western Ontario

23. Calgary Stampeders Jim Cotta WR Guelph

24. Edmonton Eskimos Dave Beaton DT Simon Fraser

25. Hamilton Tiger-Cats Paul Sheridan DE York

26. Saskatchewan Roughriders Mike Murphy LB Wilfrid Laurier

27. Ottawa Rough Riders Jim McCaffrey DB Richmond

== 4th round ==
28. Calgary Stampeders Cam Thompson LB Ottawa

29. Toronto Argonauts Brian Anderson C Guelph

30. British Columbia Lions Glenn Leonhard DT Manitoba

31. Winnipeg Blue Bombers Jamie Bone QB Western Ontario

32. Montreal Alouettes Chris Kotsopoulus WR Toronto

33. Edmonton Eskimos Ray Clark DB Simon Fraser

34. Hamilton Tiger-Cats Julio Giordani LB Toronto

35. Saskatchewan Roughriders Gary Gaska DB Manitoba

36. Ottawa Rough Riders Rod Bell TE University of New Brunswick

== 5th round ==
37. Calgary Stampeders Colin Ogilvy DB Simon Fraser

38. Toronto Argonauts David Bossey LB Notre Dame

39. British Columbia Lions Bob Hogan TB Windsor

40. Winnipeg Blue Bombers Jon McCorquindale TB Brigham Young University

41. Montreal Alouettes Rocky Treleaven K Minot State

42. Edmonton Eskimos Larry Sandre WR Windsor

43. Hamilton Tiger-Cats Glen Dawson K Marshall

44. Saskatchewan Roughriders Harry Kruger DB Calgary

45. Ottawa Rough Riders Roger Wheller WR Acadia

== 6th round ==
46. Calgary Stampeders Tom Reimer WR British Columbia

47. Toronto Argonauts Hugh Fraser WR Ottawa

48. British Columbia Lions Nigel Wilson WR Western Ontario

49. Winnipeg Blue Bombers Al Bowness TB Manitoba

50. Montreal Alouettes Grant Hagerty G Wilfrid Laurier

51. Edmonton Eskimos James Duncan TB Queen's

52. Hamilton Tiger-Cats Andre Morin DT Ottawa

53. Saskatchewan Roughriders Mike Steele G Toronto

54. Ottawa Rough Riders Dan Sartor C Ottawa

== 7th round ==
55. Calgary Stampeders Rick Stinton LB Calgary

56. Toronto Argonauts Greg Mosher DB Dalhousie

57. British Columbia Lions Terris Davis G Western Ontario

58. Winnipeg Blue Bombers Doyle Matheson DB Calgary

59. Montreal Alouettes Brian Johnston DT Mount Allison University

60. Edmonton Eskimos Mike Warbick WR Wilfrid Laurier

61. Hamilton Tiger-Cats Bill Rozalowsky TB Western Ontario

62. Hamilton Tiger-Cats Terry Tapak DE Acadia

63. Ottawa Rough Riders Ross Tripp TB McMaster

== 8th round ==
64. Calgary Stampeders Dave Langley QB Toronto

65. Toronto Argonauts Tom Arnott DT Guelph

66. British Columbia Lions Dennis Shaw G Ottawa

67. Winnipeg Blue Bombers Peter Capobianco LB Livingston

68. Montreal Alouettes Bruce Wilkins TB Bishop's

69. Edmonton Eskimos Dale Gullekson TB Alberta

70. Hamilton Tiger-Cats Mark Dumont LB St. Francis Xavier University

71. Hamilton Tiger-Cats Pat Chemeris T Waterloo

72. Ottawa Rough Riders John Harrison DB McMaster

== 9th round ==
73. Calgary Stampeders Vince Zvonkin TB Waterloo

74. Toronto Argonauts Sam Sinopoli TE Toronto

75. British Columbia Lions Paul Sheenan WR Western Kentucky

76. Winnipeg Blue Bombers Gary Krahn LB North Dakota

77. Montreal Alouettes Dave Brescacin C Windsor

78. Edmonton Eskimos Lubomir Alexov DE Toronto

79. Hamilton Tiger-Cats Jim D'Andrea DB Queen's

80. Hamilton Tiger-Cats Dean Lees LB Saint Mary's

81. Ottawa Rough Riders Phil Ridley FB St. Francis Xavier

== 10th round ==
82. Calgary Stampeders Roger Pederson DT Calgary

83. Toronto Argonauts John Vernon LB Toronto

84. British Columbia Lions Dan Dupuis TB Windsor

85. Winnipeg Blue Bombers Wayne Parizeau QB Wilfrid Laurier

86. Montreal Alouettes Mark Bohan WR Mount Allison

87. Hamilton Tiger-Cats Peter Logan WR Western Ontario

88. Hamilton Tiger-Cats James Howard T McMaster
