= 1979 Calgary Stampeders season =

Canadian football team season

- General manager: Jack Gotta
- Head coach: Jack Gotta
- Home stadium: McMahon Stadium

Results
- Record: 12–4
- Division place: 2nd, West
- Playoffs: Lost Western Final

The 1979 Calgary Stampeders finished in second place in the Western Conference with a 12–4 record. They appeared in the Western Final where they lost to the Edmonton Eskimos. This would mark the last season in which the Stampeders won a playoff game until 1991; they were the only CFL team during the 1980s that did not win a single playoff game.

== Roster ==
1979 Calgary Stampeders final roster
Quarterbacks: 16 John Hufnagel; 19 Ken Johnson; 17 Bruce Threadgill; Running backs: 10 Willie Burden; 6 Rob Forbes; 11 James Sykes; Wide receivers: 18 Willie Armstead; 22 Tom Forzani; 14 Kelvin Kirk; 9 Mike McTague P; 4 Darrell Moir; Tight ends: 70 Bob Viccars	Offensive linemen: 66 Lloyd Fairbanks T; 67 Myke Horton T; 51 Tommy Humphrey T; 69 Dave Kirzinger G; 56 Tom Krebs G; 54 Bob Lubig G; 46 Larry Tittley C; Defensive linemen: 62 Ken Dombrowski DE; 52 Miles Gorrell DT; 47 Andy Jonassen DE; 60 Reggie Lewis DE; 64 Ed McAleney DT; 76 Lyall Woznesensky DE	Linebackers: 25 Doug Battershill; 72 Bernie Morrison; 31 John Palazeti FB; Defensive backs: 27 Al Burleson; 28 Terry Irvin; 8 Rob Kochel; 32 Ray Odums; 24 Tom Reimer; 20 Robert Sparks; 26 Merv Walker; Special teams: 2 J. T. Hay K; Italics indicate International player

== Regular season ==
=== Season standings ===
Western Football Conference
Team	GP	W	L	T	PF	PA	Pts
Edmonton Eskimos	16	12	2	2	495	219	26
Calgary Stampeders	16	12	4	0	382	278	24
BC Lions	16	9	6	1	328	333	19
Winnipeg Blue Bombers	16	4	12	0	283	340	8
Saskatchewan Roughriders	16	2	14	0	194	437	4

=== Season schedule ===
Week	Game	Date	Opponent	Results		Venue	Attendance
Week	Game	Date	Opponent	Score	Record	Venue	Attendance
1	Bye						
2	1	Wed, July 18	vs. Winnipeg Blue Bombers	W 35–7	1–0	McMahon Stadium	33,196
3	2	Wed, July 25	at Montreal Alouettes	W 19–7	2–0	Olympic Stadium	51,237
3	3	Tue, July 31	at Edmonton Eskimos	L 9–44	2–1	Commonwealth Stadium	42,887
4	Bye						
5	4	Wed, Aug 8	vs. Ottawa Rough Riders	W 27–17	3–1	McMahon Stadium	32,780
6	5	Wed, Aug 15	vs. BC Lions	W 22–10	4–1	McMahon Stadium	34,825
7	6	Wed, Aug 22	at Saskatchewan Roughriders	W 6–5	5–1	Taylor Field	20,790
7	7	Tue, Aug 28	at BC Lions	L 17–18	5–2	Empire Stadium	30,018
8	8	Mon, Sept 3	vs. Edmonton Eskimos	W 26–19	5–3	McMahon Stadium	34,825
9	Bye						
10	9	Sun, Sept 16	at Saskatchewan Roughriders	W 6–5	6–3	Taylor Field	20,021
11	10	Sun, Sept 23	vs. Winnipeg Blue Bombers	W 28–23	7–3	McMahon Stadium	30,125
12	11	Sun, Sept 30	vs. Edmonton Eskimos	L 1–27	7–4	McMahon Stadium	33,245
13	12	Mon, Oct 8	at Winnipeg Blue Bombers	W 18–13	8–4	Winnipeg Stadium	22,429
14	13	Sun, Oct 14	vs. Hamilton Tiger-Cats	L 16–26	8–5	McMahon Stadium	30,925
15	14	Sat, Oct 20	at BC Lions	W 37–32	9–5	Empire Stadium	25,301
16	15	Sun, Oct 28	at Toronto Argonauts	W 28–12	10–5	Exhibition Stadium	36,226
17	16	Sun, Nov 4	vs. Saskatchewan Roughriders	W 41–8	11–5	McMahon Stadium	30,654

== Playoffs ==
=== West Semi-Final ===
Team	Q1	Q2	Q3	Q4	Total
BC Lions	1	0	0	1	2
Calgary Stampeders	3	5	29	0	37

=== West Final ===
Team	Q1	Q2	Q3	Q4	Total
Calgary Stampeders	0	3	4	0	7
Edmonton Eskimos	0	14	0	5	19

== Awards and records ==
=== 1979 CFL All-Stars ===
- SB – Willie Armstead, CFL All-Star
- OT – Lloyd Fairbanks, CFL All-Star
- DE – Reggie Lewis, CFL All-Star
- DB – Al Burleson, CFL All-Star
