= Bill Troup =

American gridiron football player (1951–2013)

- Troup in 1977

No. 12, 10
- Position: Quarterback

Personal information
- Born: April 2, 1951; Pittsburgh, Pennsylvania, U.S.
- Died: December 14, 2013 (aged 62); Pittsburgh, Pennsylvania, U.S.
- Listed height: 6 ft 5 in (1.96 m)
- Listed weight: 220 lb (100 kg)

Career information
- High school: Bethel Park (PA)
- College: South Carolina
- NFL draft: 1973: undrafted

Career history
- Calgary Stampeders (1973)*; Baltimore Colts (1974); Philadelphia Eagles (1975); Baltimore Colts (1976–1979); Winnipeg Blue Bombers (1979); Green Bay Packers (1980)
- * Offseason or practice squad member only

Career NFL statistics
- Passing attempts: 328
- Passing completions: 166
- Completion percentage: 50.6%
- TD–INT: 10–26
- Passing yards: 2,047
- Passer rating: 47.4
- Stats at Pro Football Reference

Paul William Troup III (April 2, 1951 – December 14, 2013) was an American professional football player. He was born in Pittsburgh, Pennsylvania. An undrafted quarterback from the University of South Carolina, Troup played in seven NFL seasons from 1974 to 1980 for 2 different teams. He saw his most extensive action for the Colts in 1978, when Bert Jones was injured and Mike Kirkland ineffective.

After being released by Baltimore, Troup went north to the Canadian Football League's Winnipeg Blue Bombers, where he served as the backup to starter Dieter Brock for the 1979 season.
