= 1979 BC Lions season =

Canadian football team season

- General manager: Bob Ackles
- Head coach: Vic Rapp
- Home stadium: Empire Stadium

Results
- Record: 9–6–1
- Division place: 3rd, West
- Playoffs: Lost Western Semi-Final

The 1979 BC Lions finished in third place in the Western Conference with a 9–6–1 record. They appeared in the Western Semi-Final.

Jerry Tagge had a great start to the season and led the Lions to a 6–1–1 record. However, he suffered a catastrophic knee injury mid-season that would end his career. Under sophomore backup Joe Paopao, the Lions lost five, but finished third with a 9-6-1 record, before bowing out to Calgary in the semi-final. The duo threat backfield of Larry Key with 1060 rushing yards & 289 receiving yards and John Henry White with 776 rushing yards & 422 receiving yards help carry the team after Tagge went down.

Key was a CFL All-star, along with Centre Al Wilson (for 5th straight season) and kicker Lui Passaglia who was led the league punting and was 2nd in league scoring.

After the season, "Dirty Thirty" Jim Young retired from football after 13 seasons. He retired as the Lions all-time leading receiver with 9248 yards and 65 touchdowns. Young's receiving yardage record would stand for 31 years.

Norm Fieldgate became the second Lions player to be inducted into the Canadian Football Hall of Fame.

== Offseason ==
=== CFL draft ===
| Round | Pick | Player | Position | School |
|---|---|---|---|---|
| Ter | Ter | Nick Hebeler | Defensive tackle | Simon Fraser |
| Ter | Ter | Ron Morehouse | Linebacker | San Diego State |
| 1 | 3 | Mark Houghton | Running back | California |
| 2 | 12 | Chris Curran | Defensive back | Western Ontario |
| 3 | 20 | Ken Aver | Defensive back | St. Francis Xavier |
| 3 | 21 | Murray Watson | Defensive end | Western Ontario |
| 4 | 30 | Torindo Panetta | Linebacker | Carleton |
| 5 | 39 | John MacKay | Running back | UBC |
| 6 | 48 | Berry Muis | Wide receiver | UBC |
| 7 | 57 | Paul Jaffe | Guard | Carleton |

== Preseason ==
| Game | Date | Opponent | Results | | Venue | Attendance |
| Game | Date | Opponent | Score | Record | Venue | Attendance |
|---|---|---|---|---|---|---|
| A | Tue, June 12 | at Edmonton Eskimos | W 32–27 | 1–0 | Commonwealth Stadium | 41,326 |
| B | Tue, June 19 | vs. Hamilton Tiger-Cats | W 16–11 | 2–0 | Empire Stadium | 17,839 |
| C | Tue, June 26 | vs. Winnipeg Blue Bombers | W 12–6 | 3–0 | Empire Stadium | 17,155 |
| D | Tue, July 3 | at Calgary Stampeders | L 1–32 | 3–1 | McMahon Stadium | 26,554 |

== Regular season ==
=== Season standings ===
Western Football Conference
| Team | GP | W | L | T | PF | PA | Pts |
|---|---|---|---|---|---|---|---|
| Edmonton Eskimos | 16 | 12 | 2 | 2 | 495 | 219 | 26 |
| Calgary Stampeders | 16 | 12 | 4 | 0 | 382 | 278 | 24 |
| BC Lions | 16 | 9 | 6 | 1 | 328 | 333 | 19 |
| Winnipeg Blue Bombers | 16 | 4 | 12 | 0 | 283 | 340 | 8 |
| Saskatchewan Roughriders | 16 | 2 | 14 | 0 | 194 | 437 | 4 |

=== Season schedule ===
| Week | Game | Date | Opponent | Results | | Venue | Attendance |
| Week | Game | Date | Opponent | Score | Record | Venue | Attendance |
|---|---|---|---|---|---|---|---|
| 1 | 1 | Wed, July 11 | at Saskatchewan Roughriders | W 28–4 | 1–0 | Taylor Field | 19,030 |
| 2 | 2 | Tue, July 17 | vs. Montreal Alouettes | W 25–10 | 2–0 | Empire Stadium | 51,237 |
| 3 | 3 | Tue, July 24 | at Winnipeg Blue Bombers | W 19–18 | 3–0 | Winnipeg Stadium | 24,727 |
| 4 | 4 | Tue, July 31 | vs. Saskatchewan Roughriders | W 24–15 | 4–0 | Empire Stadium | 23,308 |
| 5 | 5 | Tue, Aug 7 | vs. Edmonton Eskimos | T 14–14 | 4–0–1 | Empire Stadium | 30,137 |
| 6 | 6 | Wed, Aug 15 | at Calgary Stampeders | L 10–22 | 4–1–1 | McMahon Stadium | 34,825 |
| 7 | 7 | Tue, Aug 21 | at Hamilton Tiger-Cats | W 22–16 | 5–1–1 | Ivor Wynne Stadium | 18,420 |
| 8 | 8 | Tue, Aug 28 | vs. Calgary Stampeders | W 18–17 | 6–1–1 | Empire Stadium | 30,018 |
| 9 | Bye | | | | | | |
| 10 | 9 | Sun, Sept 9 | at Winnipeg Blue Bombers | W 17–15 | 7–1–1 | Winnipeg Stadium | 27,203 |
| 11 | 10 | Sun, Sept 16 | at Edmonton Eskimos | L 8–40 | 7–2–1 | Commonwealth Stadium | 42,776 |
| 12 | 11 | Sat, Sept 22 | vs. Toronto Argonauts | W 34–25 | 8–2–1 | Empire Stadium | 25,819 |
| 13 | 12 | Sat, Sept 29 | vs. Winnipeg Blue Bombers | W 22–21 | 9–2–1 | Empire Stadium | 23,964 |
| 14 | Bye | | | | | | |
| 15 | 13 | Sun, Oct 14 | at Ottawa Rough Riders | L 26–28 | 9–3–1 | Lansdowne Park | 25,708 |
| 16 | 14 | Sat, Oct 20 | vs. Calgary Stampeders | L 32–37 | 9–4–1 | Empire Stadium | 25,301 |
| 17 | 15 | Sun, Oct 28 | at Saskatchewan Roughriders | L 12–26 | 9–5–1 | Taylor Field | 28,012 |
| 18 | 16 | Sat, Nov 3 | vs. Edmonton Eskimos | L 17–25 | 9–6–1 | Empire Stadium | 26,575 |

== Playoffs ==
| Round | Date | Opponent | Results | | Venue | Attendance |
| Round | Date | Opponent | Score | Record | Venue | Attendance |
|---|---|---|---|---|---|---|
| West Semi-final | Sat, Nov 10 | at Calgary Stampeders | L 2–37 | 0–1 | McMahon Stadium | 31,424 |

=== West Semi-Final ===
| Team | Q1 | Q2 | Q3 | Q4 | Total |
|---|---|---|---|---|---|
| BC Lions | 1 | 0 | 0 | 1 | 2 |
| Calgary Stampeders | 3 | 5 | 29 | 0 | 37 |

=== Offensive leaders ===
| Player | Passing yds | Rushing yds | Receiving yds | TD |
| Joe Paopao | 1508 | 16 | 0 | 0 |
| Jerry Tagge | 1131 | 38 | 0 | 0 |
| Larry Key | | 1060 | 289 | 9 |
| John Henry White | | 776 | 422 | 5 |
| Leon Bright | | 7 | 569 | 5 |
| Harry Holt | | 51 | 560 | 3 |
| Al Charuk | | 0 | 515 | 3 |
| Tyrone Gray | | 0 | 356 | 1 |

== Roster ==
1979 BC Lions final roster
| Quarterbacks: 12 Mike Nott; 6 Joe Paopao; Running backs: 36 Terry Bailey; 11 Larry Key; 19 Don Taylor; 20 John Henry White; Wide receivers: 26 Leon Bright; 25 Al Charuk; 32 Ty Gray DB; 30 Jim Young; Tight ends: 72 Harry Holt; 70 Mark Houghton | Offensive linemen: 68 John Blain G/T; 69 John Blake G/T; 51 Tom Kudaba G; 54 Glenn Leonhard G; 55 Jim Lohmann T; 64 Larry Watkins T; 52 Al Wilson C; Defensive linemen: 63 Rick Goltz DT; 56 Nick Hebeler DE; 78 Frank Landy DT; 71 Richard Murray DE; 77 Louie Richardson DE; 61 Doug Seymour DT | Linebackers: 45 Sam Britts; 37 Glen Jackson; 44 Ron Morehouse; Defensive backs: 10 John Beaton; 28 Doug Carlson; 16 Devon Ford; 14 Joe Fourqurean; 18 Ken Hinton; 3 Hal Lund; 17 Frank Oliver; Special teams: 5 Lui Passaglia K/P | Injured List: 8 Jerry Tagge QB; Italics indicate International player |

== Awards and records ==
=== 1979 CFL All-Stars ===
- RB – Larry Key, CFL All-Star
- C – Al Wilson, CFL All-Star
- K – Lui Passaglia, CFL All-Star
