= John Payne (gridiron football) =

American football player and coach (1933–2019)

Biographical details
- Born: May 15, 1933; Wewoka, Oklahoma, U.S.
- Died: May 18, 2019 (aged 86); Ardmore, Oklahoma, U.S.

Playing career
- 1951–1954: Oklahoma State
- Positions: Guard, center

Coaching career (HC unless noted)
- 1956–1958: Tulsa Central HS (OK) (assistant)
- 1959–1963: McLain HS (OK)
- 1964–1965: Central State (OK) (OL)
- 1966–1967: BYU (OL)
- 1968–1969: Edmonton Eskimos (OL)
- 1970: Winnipeg Blue Bombers (assistant)
- 1971–1972: Saskatchewan Roughriders (assistant)
- 1973–1976: Saskatchewan Roughriders
- 1977: Detroit Lions (OL)
- 1978–1980: Hamilton Tiger-Cats
- 1981–1982: TCU (OC)
- 1983: Chicago Blitz (OL)
- 1983–1984: Arizona Wranglers (OL)
- 1985–1990: Abilene Christian
- 1991: Winnipeg Blue Bombers (assistant)
- 1992: Toronto Argonauts (OL)
- 1993: Sacramento Gold Miners (OL)
- 1994: BC Lions (OC)
- 1995: Winnipeg Blue Bombers (DL)
- 1996: London Monarchs (OL)
- 1996: Ottawa Rough Riders (assistant)
- 1996: Ottawa Rough Riders
- 1997: Frankfurt Galaxy (OC)
- 1998: New York CityHawks (OC)

Administrative career (AD unless noted)
- 1959–1964: McLain HS (OK)

Head coaching record
- Overall: 62–63–3 (CFL); 26–34–2 (college)

John D. Payne (May 15, 1933 – May 18, 2019) was an American collegiate and professional football coach. He served as head coach for the Saskatchewan Roughriders (1973–1976), Hamilton Tiger-Cats (1978–1980) and Ottawa Rough Riders (1996) of the Canadian Football League (CFL), compiling a career record of 62–63–3. Payne also was the head football coach at Abilene Christian University from 1985 to 1990, posting a mark of 26–34–2.

== Coaching career ==
After serving as an assistant with Central High School and BYU, Payne moved to the Canadian Football League in 1968. He served as an assistant with the Edmonton Eskimos, Winnipeg Blue Bombers and Saskatchewan Roughriders before becoming the Roughriders head coach in 1973. In his four season as head coach, Payne had a 40–23–1 record and led Saskatchewan to the 1976 Grey Cup.

Payne left the Roughriders in 1977 and joined Tommy Hudspeth's coaching staff with the Detroit Lions. The entire staff was fired on January 9, 1978. He returned to the CFL, replacing Tom Dimitroff as head coach of the Hamilton Tiger-Cats five games into the 1978 season. He had some success with Hamilton, compiling an 18–24–1 record over three seasons and leading the team to the 1980 Grey Cup. After the Tiger-Cats trouncing at the hands of the Edmonton Eskimo dynasty 48–10 in the Grey Cup game, owner Harold Ballard indicated that he preferred recently fired Arizona State football coach Frank Kush over Payne, which led to his resignation.

After leaving the Hamilton TigerCats, Payne went to Texas Christian University (TCU), where he coached as the offensive line coach under head coach F. A. Dry from 1981 to 1982. He then moved to Chicago to coach with the Chicago Blitz of the United States Football League (USFL) under George Allen. Payne moved to Arizona when the Blitz franchise was moved and became the Arizona Wranglers. In 1985, Payne became head coach at Abilene Christian University located in Abilene, Texas. He was the Wildcats head coach for six seasons and had a coaching record of 26–34–2.

Payne returned to the CFL in 1993 as the offensive line coach for the Sacramento Gold Miners. In 1995, Norton Herrick, an Orlando, Florida real estate developer, announced plans to move the CFL's Las Vegas Posse to Jackson, Mississippi. Payne was to be the club's head coach, however plans fell through and the relocation did not take place; the team instead folded. In 1996, Payne, then an assistant with the Ottawa Rough Riders, was promoted to head coach. He coached the team to a 3–11 record; the team finished the year 3–15. The Rough Riders ceased operations after the season and Payne became the final coach in the 120-year history of the team.

On November 18, 1997, the New York CityHawks of the Arena Football League named Payne offensive coordinator.

== Head coaching record ==
=== College ===
Year	Team	Overall	Conference	Standing	Bowl/playoffs
Abilene Christian Wildcats (Lone Star Conference) (1985–1990)
1985	Abilene Christian	5–4–2	2–3	T–4th	
1986	Abilene Christian	7–3	4–2	T–2nd	
1987	Abilene Christian	5–6	2–3	T–4th	
1988	Abilene Christian	3–7	3–4	6th	
1989	Abilene Christian	5–5	5–2	T–2nd	
1990	Abilene Christian	1–9	1–6	T–6th	
Abilene Christian:		26–34–2	17–20		
Total:		26–34–2			

=== CFL ===
Team	Year	Regular season					Postseason		
Team	Year	Won	Lost	Ties	Win %	Finish	Won	Lost	Result
SSK	1973	10	6	0	.625	2nd in West Division	1	1	Lost in West Final
SSK	1974	9	7	0	.563	2nd in West Division	1	1	Lost in West Final
SSK	1975	10	5	1	.656	2nd in West Division	1	1	Lost in West Final
SSK	1976	11	5	0	.688	1st in West Division	1	1	Lost Grey Cup
HAM	1978	4	7	0	.363	3rd in East Division	0	1	Lost in East Semi-Final
HAM	1979	6	10	0	.375	3rd in East Division	0	1	Lost in East Semi-Final
HAM	1980	8	7	1	.531	1st in East Division	1	1	Lost Grey Cup
OTT	1996	3	13	0	.188	Last in East Division	did not qualify		
Total		61	60	2	.508	2 Division Championships	5	7	
