= Carl Crennel =

American gridiron football player (1948–2023)

Profile
- Position: Linebacker

Personal information
- Born: September 14, 1948; Lynchburg, Virginia, U.S.
- Died: August 19, 2023 (aged 74)
- Listed height: 6 ft 1 in (1.85 m)
- Listed weight: 225 lb (102 kg)

Career information
- College: West Virginia
- NFL draft: 1970: 9th round, 209th overall pick

Career history
- 1970: Pittsburgh Steelers
- 1971: Winnipeg Blue Bombers
- 1972–1979: Montreal Alouettes
- 1979: Edmonton Eskimos
- 1980: Hamilton Tiger-Cats
- 1981: Saskatchewan Roughriders

Awards and highlights
- 3× Grey Cup champion (1974, 1977, 1979); 3× CFL East All-Star (1973, 1978, 1979); Second-team All-American (1969); Third-team All-American (1968)
- Stats at Pro Football Reference

Carl Lee Crennel (September 14, 1948 – August 19, 2023) was an American professional football player who was a linebacker in the National Football League (NFL) and Canadian Football League (CFL). He played one season with the Pittsburgh Steelers in the NFL, and for several different teams in the CFL, most notably the Montreal Alouettes from 1972 to 1979; he won two Grey Cup championships with the Alouettes, and one with the Edmonton Eskimos. He was selected in the ninth round of the 1970 NFL draft out of West Virginia, where he captained the Mountaineers to a 10–1 record in 1969 and a victory in the Peach Bowl; he was named MVP in the game. In 1998 Crennel was made a member of the West Virginia University Sports Hall of Fame.

Crennel was the younger brother of Romeo Crennel, the former head coach of the Cleveland Browns and Kansas City Chiefs, and the interim head coach of the Houston Texans during the final 12 games of the 2020 season.

Carl Crennel died on August 19, 2023, at the age of 74.
