= Greg Butler =

Greg Butler may refer to:

- Greg Butler (basketball), American basketball player
- Greg Butler (swimmer), English swimmer
- Greg Butler (visual effects supervisor), American visual effects supervisor

== See also ==
- Gregg Butler, gridiron football player
