= Queen's Grant High School =

American charter school in North Carolina

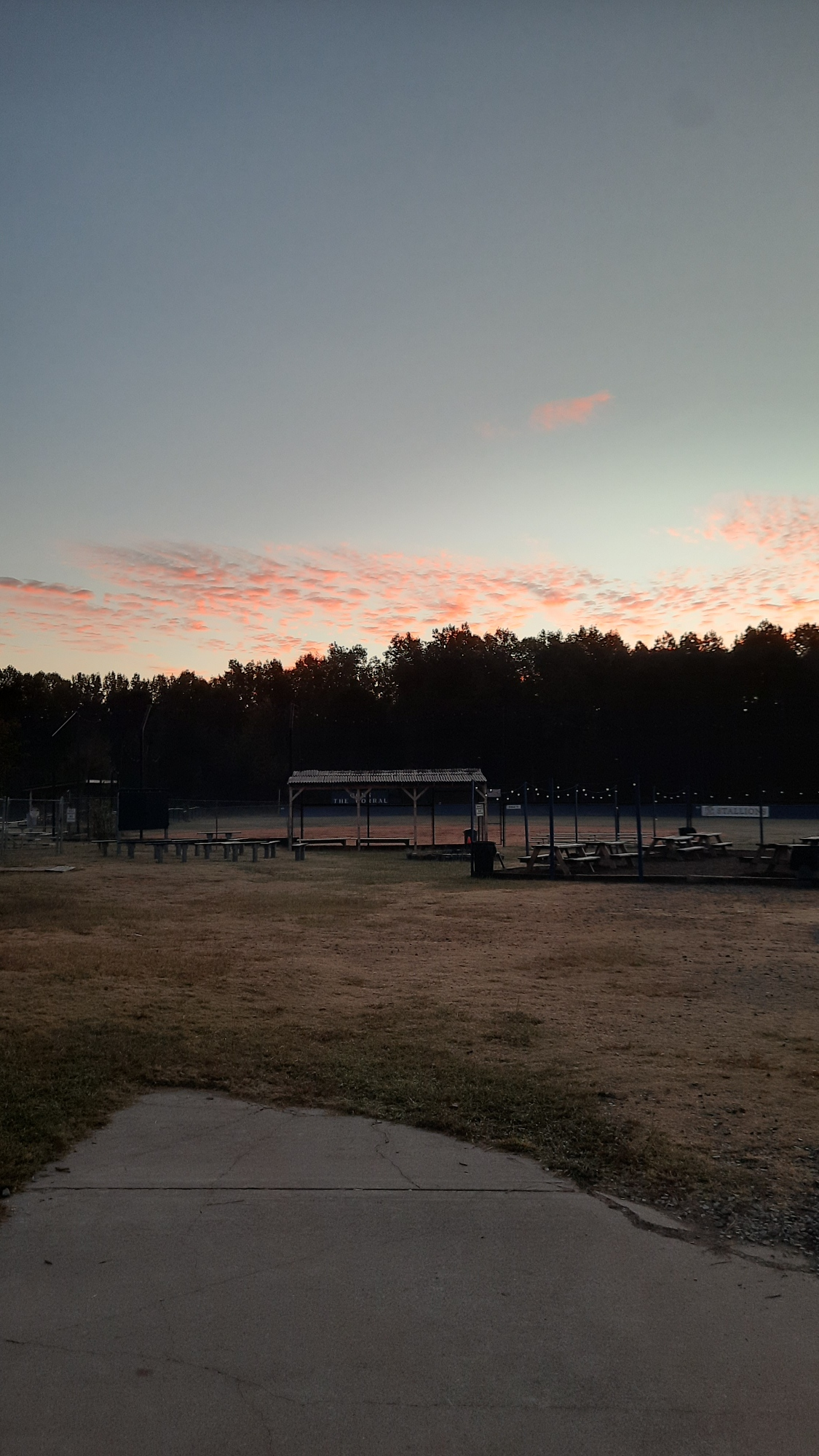
- Sunrise at the Queen's Grant Softball Field in 2022

Location
- 10323 Idlewild Road; Matthews, North Carolina 28105; United States; 35°10′03″N 80°41′59″W

Information
- Type: Charter
- Motto: Excellence in Academic Achievement and Moral Character
- Established: 2007 (19 years ago)
- Oversight: Charlotte-Mecklenburg Schools
- CEEB code: 340643
- Principal: Josh Swartzlander (formerly Michael Smith)
- Grades: 9–12
- Gender: Co-ed
- Enrollment: 430+
- Campus type: Rural
- Colors: Navy and grey
- Mascot: Stallion
- Nickname: Stallions
- Website: www.queensgranthigh.org

Queen's Grant High School is a charter school in Matthews, North Carolina. The campus is on 32 acres, formerly Idlewild Country Club. It is an extension of Queen's Grant Community School, an NHA charter that offers grades K-8.

== History ==
Queen's Grant was formed in 2006, and opened in 2007 with ninth and tenth grades. The school rented space until 2009, when it first assembled modular units to accommodate over 400 students.

In 2010, Queen's Grant appointed Principal Michael Smith, who was recruited by former Mint Hill, North Carolina Mayor Ted Biggers. Smith retired and was replaced by Josh Swartzlander in 2019.

== Academics ==
Non-AP classes at Queen's Grant do not follow the same curriculum as Charlotte-Mecklenburg Schools, however, material is often similar in order to meet North Carolina's education standards. Each student must have a minimum of 22 credits in order to graduate.

Dual enrollment is offered by Queen's Grant through Central Piedmont Community College. Only juniors and seniors are allowed to participate in dual enrollment. All students, regardless of grade, are allowed to take North Carolina Virtual Public School classes on-site.

=== Learning ===
The school day lasts just under seven hours for most students. Queen's Grant utilizes multiple online platforms for work and grade management, including Schoology and PowerSchool. Students are provided with Google Workspace accounts.

== Athletics ==
Queen's Grant is a member of the North Carolina High School Athletic Association (NCHSAA), with sports teams in: Soccer, Volleyball, Basketball, Softball, Baseball, Wrestling, Cross Country, Track, Cheerleading, and Lacrosse.

The school has soccer, softball, and baseball fields. It also features a half-mile cross country trail and a small volleyball area. All other athletic practices, games, and events are held off-site at various local facilities.

== Building campaign ==
In 2019, Queen's Grant announced plans to construct a building to be used as a student performance center and gymnasium. The school hopes to raise $5 million for the project.

During Summer 2022, Principal Josh Swartzlander announced plans via email to "embark on the construction of our new GYMPAC" in the fall.

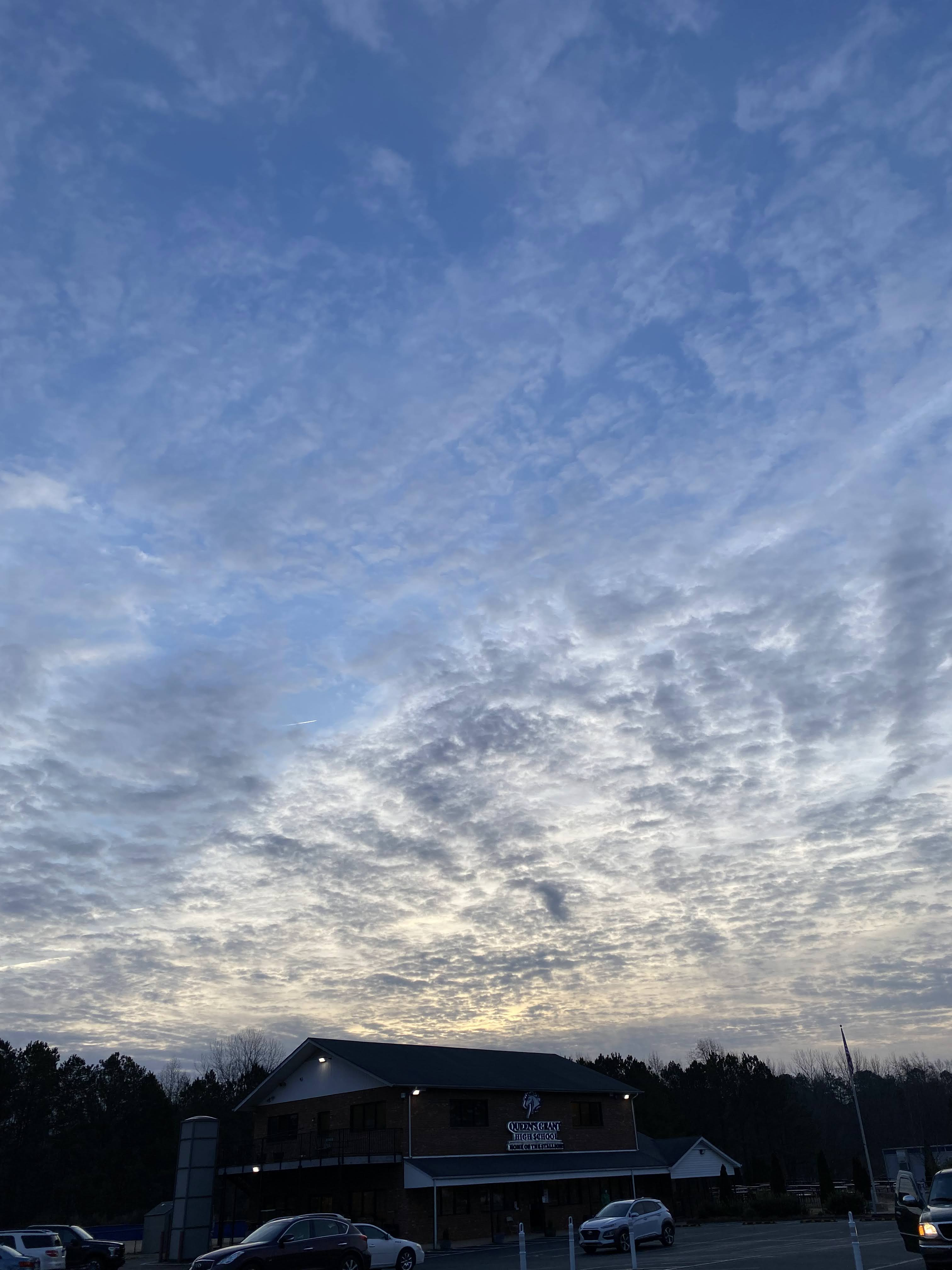
Queen's Grant High Admin Building

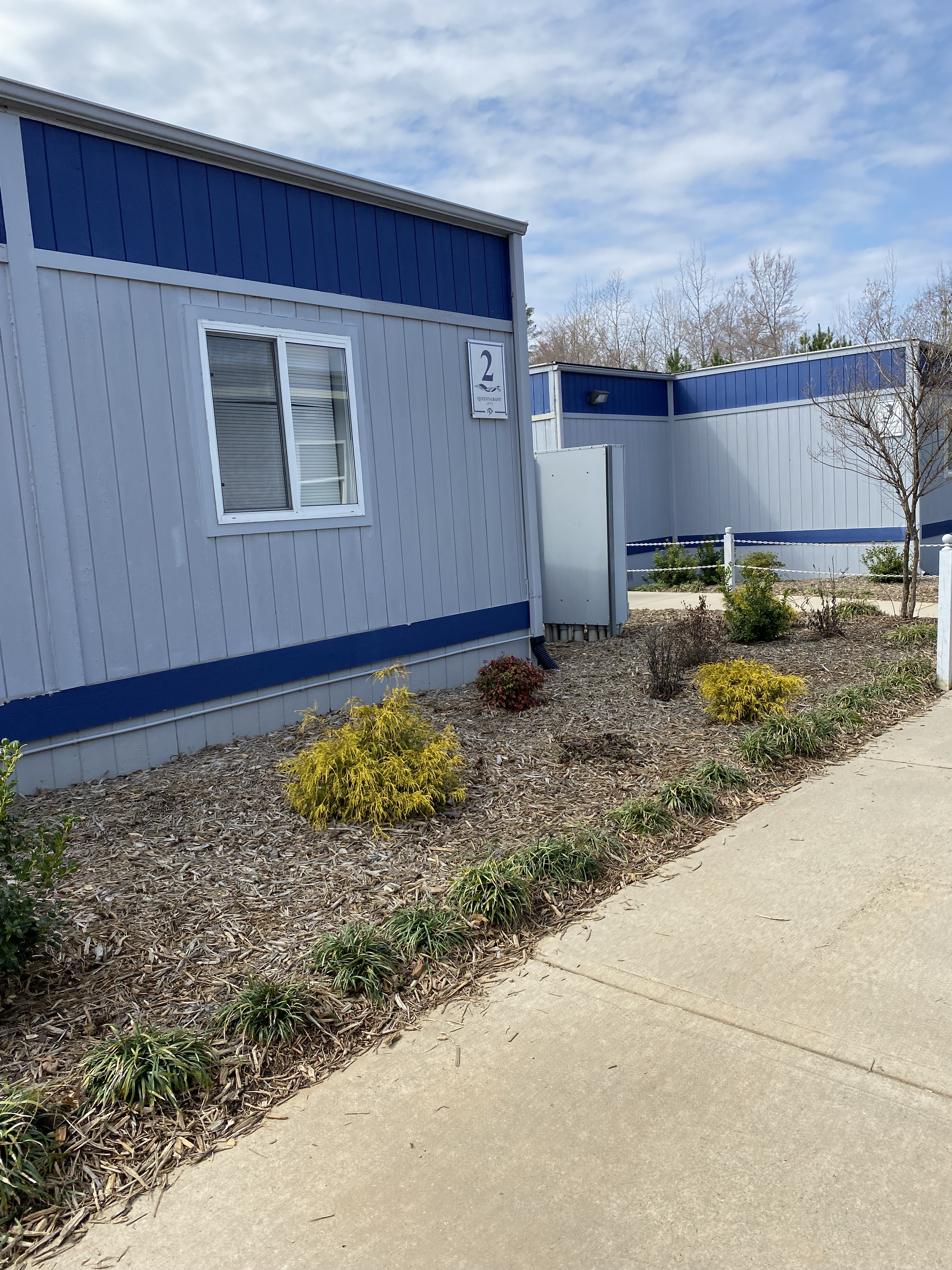
Queen's Grant High Modular Units
