= Richlands High School =

Richlands High School may refer to:

- Richlands High School (North Carolina)
- Richlands High School (Richlands, Virginia)
