= 1979 Hamilton Tiger-Cats season =

Season of Canadian Football League team the Hamilton Tiger-Cats

- Head coach: John Payne
- Home stadium: Ivor Wynne Stadium

Results
- Record: 6–10
- Division place: 3rd, East
- Playoffs: Lost Eastern Semi-Final
- Team MOP: Tom Clements
- Team MOC: Leif Pettersen
- Team MOR: Jim Reid

The 1979 Hamilton Tiger-Cats season was the 22nd season for the team in the Canadian Football League (CFL) and their 30th overall. The Tiger-Cats finished in third place in the Eastern Conference with a 6–10 record, but lost the Eastern Semi-Final to the Ottawa Rough Riders.

Star quarterback Tom Clements was acquired from the Saskatchewan Roughriders in a mid-season trade and went on to lead the league in passing. Additionally, University of Western Ontario quarterback Jamie Bone attended Tiger-Cats training camp but was cut. He took the Tiger-Cats to the Ontario Human Rights Tribunal, alleging that he was never given a fair chance to compete for a quarterback position because he was Canadian. During the proceedings, the Tiger Cats admitted that they had made up their mind on who the starters would be. Bone won his case, and the tribunal awarded him $10,000. The Tiger-Cats were awarded to give him a 14-day tryout in 1980.

== Roster ==
1979 Hamilton Tiger-Cats final roster
Quarterbacks: 2 Tom Clements; 8 Dave Marler; 7 Ed Smith; Running backs: 24 Rufus Crawford; 36 Bill Harrison; 32 Neil Lumsden K; Wide receivers: 73 John Holland; 74 Rick Kuchma; 22 Gord Paterson; 71 Leif Pettersen	Tight ends: 76 Craig Labbett; Offensive linemen: 68 Larry Butler G; 65 Ed George T; 67 Randy Halsall G; 66 Willie Martin T; 56 Alan Moffat G/DT; 50 Henry Waszczuk C; Defensive linemen: 64 Linden Davidson DT; 58 Jim Heighton DE; 69 Mike Riley DT; 62 Angelo Wells DE	Linebackers: 47 Bill Banks; 41 Jack Blair; 39 Lou Clare; 31 Ben Zambiasi; Defensive backs: 13 Ray Clark; 20 Larry Dorsey; 33 Al Dosant; 14 Randy Graham; 34 Zac Henderson; 3 Ike Thomas; 37 David Shaw; 6 Harold Woods	Special teams: 4 Zenon Andrusyshyn K; Injured list: 23 Rocky Dipietro TE; 75 Tom Poe LB; 21 Jim Reid RB; 60 Glenn Robinson DE; 26 Ronnie Rowland RB; 70 Kerry Smith WR; Italics indicate American players

== Regular season ==
=== Season standings ===
Eastern Football Conference
Team	GP	W	L	T	PF	PA	Pts
Montreal Alouettes	16	11	4	1	351	284	23
Ottawa Rough Riders	16	8	6	2	349	315	18
Hamilton Tiger-Cats	16	6	10	0	280	338	12
Toronto Argonauts	16	5	11	0	234	352	10

=== Season schedule ===
Week	Game	Date	Opponent	Results		Venue	Attendance
Week	Game	Date	Opponent	Score	Record	Venue	Attendance
1	1	July 11	at Ottawa Rough Riders	L 19–30	0–1		
2	2	July 18	vs. Toronto Argonauts	L 11–18	0–2		
3	3	July 25	at Montreal Alouettes	W 24–20	1–2		
4	4	Aug 1	vs. Saskatchewan Roughriders	L 8–21	1–3		
5	5	Aug 8	at Toronto Argonauts	L 0–25	1–4		
6	6	Aug 14	at Winnipeg Blue Bombers	L 21–27	1–5		
7	7	Aug 21	vs. BC Lions	L 16–22	1–6		
8	8	Sept 3	vs. Ottawa Rough Riders	W 16–9	2–6		
9	9	Sept 8	at Ottawa Rough Riders	L 4–44	2–7		
10	10	Sept 16	vs. Montreal Alouettes	L 14–21	2–8		
11	11	Sept 23	vs. Edmonton Eskimos	L 21–22	2–9		
12	12	Sept 29	at Toronto Argonauts	W 17–16	3–9		
13	13	Oct 8	vs. Toronto Argonauts	W 42–3	4–9		
14	14	Oct 14	at Calgary Stampeders	W 26–16	5–9		
15	15	Oct 21	vs. Ottawa Rough Riders	W 21–3	6–9		
16	Bye						
17	16	Nov 5	at Montreal Alouettes	L 20–41	6–10		

== Post-season ==
Round	Date	Opponent	Results		Venue	Attendance
Round	Date	Opponent	Score	Record	Venue	Attendance
Eastern Semi-Final	Nov 11	at Ottawa Rough Riders	L 26–29	0–1		

== Awards and honours ==
- Tom Clements, All-Eastern Quarterback
- Ben Zambiasi, Linebacker, CFL's Most Outstanding Defensive Player Award
- Garney Henley was elected into the Canadian Football Hall of Fame as a Player, on June 30, 1979.
- Peter Neumann was elected into the Canadian Football Hall of Fame as a Player, June 30, 1979.
