= Joe Scannella =

American gridiron football player and coach (1928–2018)

Joseph Louis Scannella
Profile
- Position: Quarterback

Personal information
- Born: May 22, 1928; Passaic, New Jersey, U.S.
- Died: May 3, 2018 (aged 89); Walnut Creek, California, U.S.

Career information
- College: Lehigh

Career history
- 1954: Clifton HS (NJ) (assistant)
- 1955–1959: Oceanside HS (NY)
- 1960: Cornell (WR)
- 1961–1963: Baldwin HS (NY)
- 1964–1967: C. W. Post
- 1969: Montreal Alouettes (QB/RB)
- 1970–1971: Vermont
- 1972–1977: Oakland Raiders (ST)
- 1978–1981: Montreal Alouettes
- 1982–1983: Cleveland Browns (RB)
- 1984: Cleveland Browns (OC)
- 1988–1993: Los Angeles Raiders (RB)

Awards and highlights
- Super Bowl champion (XI)

Joseph Louis Scannella (May 22, 1928 – May 3, 2018) was an American football coach.

== Biography ==
Scannella was born on May 22, 1928, in Passaic, New Jersey, to Anthony and Jenny ( castrogiovanni) Scannella.

== Playing career ==
Scannella played quarterback at Lehigh University from 1947 to 1949 before coaching.

== Coaching career ==
He began his coaching career as an assistant at Clifton High School in Clifton, New Jersey. His first head coaching job was at Oceanside High School in Oceanside, New York. He was the Sailors head coach from 1955 to 1959 before becoming the ends coach at Cornell University. He left Cornell after one season to become head coach at Baldwin High School.

In 1964, he was hired by C.W. Post Campus of Long Island University to serve as head football coach and athletic director. In four seasons with the Pioneers, he had a 19–15–2 record. He left in 1968 to take a front-office job with the New York Giants. He was hired by Holy Cross in February 1969 to serve as the Crusaders offensive coordinator but resigned a week later to become offensive backfield coach for the Montreal Alouettes. In 1970, he was hired by the University of Vermont to coach the Catamounts football team.

In 1972, he became the special teams coach for the Oakland Raiders under head coach John Madden. He was a member of the coaching staff in 1976 when the Raiders defeated the Minnesota Vikings in Super Bowl XI. He left the Raiders to become head coach of the Montreal Alouettes. Scannella coached the Alouettes from 1978 to 1981, with his Alouettes appearing in the 66th and 67th Grey Cups, losing both.

Scannella was Sam Rutigliano's running backs coach in Cleveland from 1982 to 1983 before being promoted to offensive coordinator in 1984. He was not retained by the new head coach Marty Schottenheimer following the 1984 season. In 1987, Scannella returned to the Raiders, who had by this time moved to Los Angeles, this time as the team's offensive backfield coach. Here he would coach two former Heisman Trophy winners Marcus Allen and Bo Jackson. After the 1988 season, he and quarterbacks coach Tom Walsh were fired by the head coach Mike Shanahan, but owner Al Davis refused to allow this and the two coaches stayed on. Joe Scannella retired from coaching in February 1994. He served as a scout for the Indianapolis Colts during the 2000s.

== Death ==
Scannella died on May 3, 2018, in Walnut Creek, California, three weeks short of his 90th birthday. At the time of his death, he was the last living Vermont varsity football head coach. He is survived by his wife, Lillian Scannella, his 4 children, his grandchildren, and his sister, Marylin Trauth.

== Head coaching record ==
College football

Year	Team	Overall	Conference	Standing	Bowl/playoffs
C. W. Post Pioneers (NCAA College Division independent) (1964–1967)
1964	C. W. Post	4–5			
1965	C. W. Post	3–5–1			
1966	C. W. Post	7–1–1			
1967	C. W. Post	5–4			
C. W. Post:		19–15–2			
Vermont Catamounts (Yankee Conference) (1970–1971)
1970	Vermont	0–9	0–5	6th	
1971	Vermont	2–7	2–3	5th	
Vermont:		2–16	2–8		
Total:		21–31–2			

CFL

Team	Year	Regular season					Postseason		
Team	Year	Won	Lost	Ties	Win %	Finish	Won	Lost	Result
MTL	1978	8	7	1	.533	2nd in Eastern Conference	1	1	Lost Grey Cup
MTL	1979	11	4	1	.733	1st in Eastern Conference	1	1	Lost Grey Cup
MTL	1980	8	8	0	.500	2nd in Eastern Conference	0	1	Lost in Eastern Conference Final
MTL	1981	3	13	0	.188	3rd in Eastern Division	–	–	
MTL total		30	32	2	.484		2	3	.400
Total		30	32	2	.484	1 Conference; Championship	2	3	
