= Lou Clare =

Canadian gridiron football player (1950–2017)

Profile
- Positions: Linebacker, Defensive back

Personal information
- Born: March 13, 1950; Mississauga, Ontario, Canada
- Died: August 21, 2017 (aged 67); Regina, Saskatchewan, Canada
- Listed height: 6 ft 1 in (1.85 m)
- Listed weight: 225 lb (102 kg)

Career information
- College: Minnesota

Career history
- 1973–1975: Hamilton Tiger-Cats
- 1976–1979: Saskatchewan Roughriders
- 1979–1981: Hamilton Tiger-Cats
- 1981: Montreal Alouettes

Lou Clare (March 13, 1950 - August 21, 2017) was a Canadian professional football defensive back and linebacker who played nine seasons in the Canadian Football League, mainly for the Saskatchewan Roughriders.
