= Richlands High School (North Carolina) =

American public school in North Carolina

Location
- 8100 Richlands Hwy; Richlands, North Carolina 28574; United States; 34°53′31″N 77°32′38″W

Information
- Type: Public
- Motto: Excellence in Education
- School district: Onslow County Schools
- CEEB code: 343295
- Principal: Steven E. Clarke
- Faculty: 39
- Teaching staff: 58.41 (FTE)
- Grades: 9–12
- Enrollment: 1,043 (2023-2024)
- Student to teacher ratio: 17.86
- Colors: Blue and Vegas gold
- Athletics: Baseball, Basketball, Cheerleading, Cross Country, Football, Golf, Soccer, Softball, Swimming, Tennis, Track and Field, Volleyball, Wrestling
- Mascot: Wildcat
- Nickname: Wildcats
- Rival: Southwest High School
- Accreditation: Four-year, comprehensive high school by the North Carolina State Department of Education.
- Yearbook: Progressor
- Website: rhs.onslow.k12.nc.us

Richlands High School is a public high school in Richlands, North Carolina, a town within the vicinity of Jacksonville, North Carolina that has an enrollment of approximately 933. It is part of the Onslow County School District. Steven E. Clarke is the current principal.

== Academics and curriculum ==
Advanced Placement courses offered by the school include Calculus AB, Statistics, Biology, US History, English Language and Composition, English Literature and Composition, Environmental Science among others. Through the North Carolina Virtual Public School and Onslow Virtual Academy, Richlands students can take courses that are not offered at their school. Students may also participate in a variety of vocational programs at Coastal Carolina Community College, or the Eastern North Carolina Regional Skills Center in Jacksonville, North Carolina.

RHS offers thirteen honors classes. These honors classes include courses in all four years of English, Math I to III, Precalculus, Biology, Earth Science, Chemistry, and also in World History, American History, and Civics and Economics.

The 2006–2007 School Report Card for Richlands High School designates it as a School of Progress, with 60 to 80% of the students on grade level. The school also met all thirteen of its designated adequate yearly progress (AYP) goals. The average SAT score was 1025, eight points above the national average, with a 40% participation rate. The school ranks below the school district average in the technology and resources available to students, with fewer computers and books available per student and a library with much older books on average. Only 84% of the teaching staff is fully licensed (with the State average at 89%). Also, a higher-than-average percentage of teachers at Richlands High School have more than ten years of teaching experience. (54% have ten years or more: State average 53%)

Richlands High School scores well on standardized state tests, and has above state average attendance at 96%. Richlands High School is accredited as a four-year, comprehensive high school by the North Carolina State Department of Education. The school year consists of two ninety-day semesters with six six-week grading periods.

== Extracurricular activities ==
Richlands hosts sports teams that participate in basketball, baseball, cheerleading, cross country, football, golf, soccer, swimming, tennis, track and field, volleyball, and wrestling. Visual and performing arts opportunities offered at Richlands include band, chorus, dance, guitar, musical and orchestra.

== Facilities and faculty ==
A math and science building opened starting with the 2008–2009 school year. It contains 11 classrooms and two Chemistry Labs, an additional parking lot was also added at the school. The school auditorium can seat up to 500 people, and is the site for Richlands' spring musical. The school cafeteria is designed to accommodate Richlands' students over three lunch periods. Richlands has access to the Internet, data networking, cable, video equipment, and an assistive listening sound system.

There are roughly 89 faculty members employed at Richlands High School. 25% of these faculty members have master's degrees or higher degree. The current principal is Steven E. Clarke, and current assistant principals are Cara Jackson and Christel Caliguire.

== Notable alumni ==
- David Green — former Canadian Football League All-Star and NFL player
- Tyler Matthews — part-time NASCAR driver in the Xfinity Series
- Mario Williams — NFL defensive end, #1 overall pick of the 2006 NFL draft
