= Jim Heighton =

Canadian football player (1944–2023)

Profile
- Position: Defensive end

Personal information
- Born: September 22, 1944; Vancouver, British Columbia, Canada
- Died: December 9, 2023 (aged 79); British Columbia, Canada
- Listed height: 6 ft 3 in (1.91 m)
- Listed weight: 252 lb (114 kg)

Career history
- 1969: BC Lions
- 1970–1978: Winnipeg Blue Bombers
- 1979–1980: Hamilton Tiger-Cats
- 1981: Montreal Alouettes

Awards and highlights
- 4× CFL West All-Star (1971, 1972, 1974, 1976)

James Heighton (September 22, 1944 – December 9, 2023) was a Canadian professional football player who was a defensive lineman during thirteen seasons in the Canadian Football League, mainly for the Winnipeg Blue Bombers. He was a CFL West All-Star in 1971, 1974, and 1976, and was also named to the 1972 and 1974 Western Conference All-Star teams as selected by the Football Reporters of Canada. In 1974 and 1976, he won the Dr Bert Oja Award as the Bombers' Most Valuable Lineman. Heighton was also a three-time Schenley award nominee (1974 Most Outstanding Canadian; 1974 Most Outstanding Defenseman; 1976 Most Outstanding Canadian). In 2014, he was inducted into the Winnipeg Blue Bombers Hall of Fame.

As a Masters athlete in Track and Field, Heighton won eight gold medals at the national level in weight throw, hammer throw, shot put and pentathlon (2008, 2013). He was twice inducted into the Manitoba Baseball Hall of Fame (2009, 2011) as a player for the Giroux Athletics and for the Grosse Isle Blue Jays championship baseball teams. An all-round athlete, Heighton also played on several medal-winning amateur basketball and soccer teams, and was an owner/breeder/racer of thoroughbred horses.

In 2016, he was named to the Manitoba Sports Hall of Fame. He died from complications from dementia on December 9, 2023, at the age of 79.
