= Bruce Smith (Canadian football) =

American gridiron football player (1949–2013)

Profile
- Positions: Linebacker, Defensive end, Defensive tackle

Personal information
- Born: March 28, 1949; Huntsville, Texas
- Died: January 3, 2013 (aged 63); Toronto, Ontario
- Listed height: 6 ft 2 in (1.88 m)
- Listed weight: 235 lb (107 kg)

Career information
- College: Colorado Boulder

Career history
- 1972–1973: Hamilton Tiger-Cats
- 1974: Edmonton Eskimos
- 1975: Ottawa Rough Riders
- 1976–1979: Toronto Argonauts

Awards and highlights
- Grey Cup champion (1972)

Bruce Smith (March 28, 1949 – January 3, 2013) was a Canadian football player who played for the Hamilton Tiger-Cats, Edmonton Eskimos, Ottawa Rough Riders and Toronto Argonauts. He won the Grey Cup with Hamilton in 1972. He played college football at the University of Colorado Boulder. After retiring from the CFL he became a successful real estate agent in Toronto. A born-again Christian, Smith became an ordained chaplain at King Bay Chaplaincy in 1999. He also worked with Upper Canada College's Chaplain Service. He died of pancreatic cancer in 2013. His memoir, Our Father: The Prodigal Son Returns, was published posthumously the same year.
