= York Hentschel =

Canadian gridiron football player (1953–2006)

No. 69
- Position: Defensive lineman

Personal information
- Born: June 16, 1953; Bentley, Alberta, Canada
- Died: March 2, 2006 (aged 52); Edmonton, Alberta, Canada

Career information
- College: Drake University

Career history
- 1976–80: Edmonton Eskimos
- 1981: Hamilton Tiger-Cats
- 1981: Winnipeg Blue Bombers

Awards and highlights
- 3× Grey Cup champion (1978, 1979, 1980)

York Hentschel (born June 16, 1953 - March 2, 2006) was a Grey Cup champion defensive lineman with the Edmonton Eskimos.

As a member of the famed "Alberta Crude" defence, Hentschel won three Grey Cups with the Eskimos (1978 to 1980). Many felt that his skills were under-appreciated because he played next to three all-stars: Dave Fennell, Ron Estay and David Boone.

He finished his career in 1981 playing for the Hamilton Tiger-Cats and the Winnipeg Blue Bombers.

Hentschel took an improbable route to pro football. Having played two years of junior football with the Red Deer Packers and having played at Drake University, he was discovered by Edmonton coach Ray Jauch while working as a lifeguard in Miami, Florida.

He was admired and respected by his teammates. A man of few words, Tom Wilkinson said: "In all the time he was here, I don't know if he said 20 words." He died of organ failure in Edmonton on March 2nd, 2006. York Hentschel was just 52 years old. On November 19, 2008, the CBC Television show The Fifth Estate suggested that Hentschel, who went through years of alcohol and drug abuse and depression, was affected by years of unreported head injuries from playing professional football. Teammates David Boone and Bill Stevenson are believed to have had the same injuries.
