= Eric Upton =

Canadian football player (1953–2024)

No. 57
- Position: Guard

Personal information
- Born: April 29, 1953; Ottawa, Ontario, Canada
- Died: May 23, 2024 (aged 71); Edmonton, Alberta, Canada
- Listed height: 6 ft 3 in (1.91 m)
- Listed weight: 245 lb (111 kg)

Career information
- College: Ottawa
- CFL draft: 1976: 2nd round, 18th overall pick

Career history
- 1976–1985: Edmonton Eskimos

Awards and highlights
- 5× Grey Cup champion (1978, 1979, 1980, 1981, 1982); CFL West All-Star (1979); Vanier Cup champion (1975)

Eric Thomas Upton (April 29, 1953 – May 23, 2024) was a Canadian professional football player who was an offensive lineman for the Edmonton Eskimos of the Canadian Football League (CFL). He was named a CFL Western All-Star in 1979 and was a part of five Grey Cup championship teams with the Eskimos. Upton played CIAU football at the University of Ottawa, where he was a member of the 1975 Vanier Cup championship team. He died on May 23, 2024, at the age of 71.

== Sources ==
- Turchansky, Ray (November 19, 1981). "Upton Knows Ottawa Best". Edmonton Journal.
- Gilbert, Doug (November 23, 1977). "Jauch Says Eskimos Best In 12 Years". The Montreal Gazette - Google News Archive Search.
- Spector, Mark (November 25, 2010). "Spector on CFL: All but a dynasty". sportsnet.ca.
