= John Kinch =

Canadian football player (1954–2022)

No. 27, 28, 20, 26, 34
- Positions: Running back, fullback

Personal information
- Born: December 20, 1954; Hamilton, Ontario, Canada
- Died: December 23, 2022 (aged 68); Perry, Ohio, US
- Listed height: 6 ft 1 in (1.85 m)
- Listed weight: 205 lb (93 kg)

Career information
- High school: Sir Winston Churchill HS; Sir Wilfrid Laurier SS
- College: Youngstown State (1973–1976)

Career history

Playing
- 1977–1978: Hamilton Tiger-Cats
- 1978: Toronto Argonauts
- 1979: Ottawa Rough Riders
- 1979–1980: Saskatchewan Roughriders
- 1981–1982: Toronto Argonauts

Coaching
- ?: Riverside HS (assistant)
- ?: Lake Erie (assistant)

Career statistics
- Games played: 60
- Rush attempts: 99
- Rushing yards: 416
- Receptions: 53
- Receiving yards: 338
- Touchdowns: 6

John David Kinch (December 20, 1954 – December 23, 2022) was a Canadian football player who was a running back and fullback for five seasons in the Canadian Football League (CFL) for the Hamilton Tiger-Cats, Toronto Argonauts, Ottawa Rough Riders and Saskatchewan Roughriders. He played college football in the United States at Youngstown State and is an inductee to their hall of fame. He later served as a coach.

== Early life and education ==
Kinch was born on December 20, 1954, in Hamilton, Ontario. He attended Sir Winston Churchill High School and Sir Wilfrid Laurier Secondary School, earning the city excellence award at the former for his talents in baseball and bowling.

Kinch was given a football scholarship by Youngstown State University and enrolled at the school in 1973. He recorded his first start on the football team as a true freshman, recording 89 rushing yards against Eastern Illinois. As a sophomore, Kinch helped Youngstown State to an 8–1 regular season record, while rushing for a school-record 1,078 yards and a team-leading nine touchdowns. He went on to play two more seasons, and at the time finished as the all-time leading rusher at the school with 2,306 yards. At the end of his senior season, Kinch was selected to play in the Ohio Shrine Bowl.

== Professional career ==
Kinch was chosen as a territorial exemption player by the Hamilton Tiger-Cats in the 1977 CFL draft. As a rookie, he appeared in 15 games, missing only one, but only recorded one rush for no yards and one reception for 11 yards. He appeared in six games for Hamilton in 1978, posting 22 rushes for 103 yards and 16 receptions for 109 yards, scoring three touchdowns. In August 1978, he was traded to the Toronto Argonauts, for whom he played eight games, running 21 times for 82 yards, along with eight catches for 14 yards. Kinch signed a two-year contract with Toronto in March 1979, but was released the following June.

In July 1979, Kinch was signed by the Ottawa Rough Riders, and scored a touchdown in his debut on a three-yard reception. He was released early in August, after having appeared in just three games. He recorded two catches for 19 yards and a touchdown along with two kick returns for 52 yards with the Rough Riders; those were his only statistics.

After being released by Ottawa, Kinch signed with the Saskatchewan Roughriders. In his second game with the team, he led all of their receivers with five catches for 57 yards. He appeared in 12 games with Saskatchewan during the 1979 season, and totaled with them six receptions for 69 yards and 23 rushes for 93 yards. Kinch returned to the Roughriders in 1980 and appeared in eight games, recording 130 rushing yards on 27 carries and 17 catches for 84 yards and one score before being placed on the injured list at the start of November.

Kinch later left Saskatchewan and was signed by the Toronto Argonauts in May 1981. He appeared in eight games for the team that year, and recorded five rushes for nine yards and three catches for 32 yards and one touchdown. He was eventually released in March 1982, ending his professional football career. Kinch finished his career with 60 games played, 99 rushes for 416 yards and 53 receptions for 338 yards and six touchdowns.

Early in his professional football career, Kinch also worked as a mail carrier.

== Later life and death ==
In 1995, Kinch was inducted into the Youngstown State Athletic Hall of Fame. He later coached at Riverside High School and for the Lake Erie Storm football team.

Kinch died from cancer on December 23, 2022, three days after his 68th birthday, in Perry, Ohio.
