= North American Indoor Football League (2005) =

The North American Indoor Football League (NAIFL) was a proposed indoor football league that announced plans in 2004 to begin play in fourteen Canadian cities beginning in February 2005. The game played was to be a unique indoor version of Canadian football. Teams were to be centrally owned, and former Edmonton Eskimos quarterback Tom Wilkinson was to serve as league president. The league never played a single game and its website went offline in early 2006.

The 14 teams announced were:

East Division

Team	City	Arena
Fredericton Feud	Fredericton, New Brunswick	Aitken Centre
Halifax Havoc	Halifax, Nova Scotia	Halifax Metro Centre
Montreal Machete	Montreal, Quebec	Bell Centre
Ottawa Omega	Ottawa, Ontario	Canadian Tire Centre
Quebec Quantum	Quebec City, Quebec	Colisee Pepsi
St. John's Storm	St. John's, Newfoundland & Labrador	Mile One Stadium
Toronto Terror	Toronto, Ontario	Air Canada Centre

West Division

Team	City	Arena
Calgary Crusade	Calgary, Alberta	Pengrowth Saddledome
Edmonton Extreme	Edmonton, Alberta	Rexall Place
Regina Rage	Regina, Saskatchewan	Regina Agridome
Saskatoon Swarm	Saskatoon, Saskatchewan	Credit Union Centre
Vancouver Victory	Vancouver, British Columbia	General Motors Place
Victoria Valor	Victoria, British Columbia	Save On Foods Memorial Centre
Winnipeg War	Winnipeg, Manitoba	MTS Centre
