= Wes Phillips (offensive tackle) =

American football player (born 1953)

No. 61
- Position: Tackle

Personal information
- Born: August 1, 1953 (age 73); Atlanta, Georgia, U.S.
- Listed height: 6 ft 5 in (1.96 m)
- Listed weight: 275 lb (125 kg)

Career information
- High school: Cross Keys (Brookhaven, Georgia)
- College: Lenoir–Rhyne
- NFL draft: 1977: undrafted

Career history
- Dallas Cowboys (1977)*; Atlanta Falcons (1978)*; Houston Oilers (1979); Ottawa Rough Riders (1979–1980); Houston Oilers (1982)*; Tampa Bay Bandits (1983)
- * Offseason or practice squad member only
- Stats at Pro Football Reference

Wesley Alan Phillips (born August 1, 1953) is an American former professional football tackle who played for the Houston Oilers of National Football League (NFL). He played college football at Lenoir–Rhyne University.
