= Ken Preston (Canadian football) =

Canadian football player, coach and executive (1917–1991)

No. 44
- Positions: QB, HB

Personal information
- Born: October 19, 1917; Smith Falls, Ontario, Canada
- Died: August 2, 1991 (aged 73); Regina, Saskatchewan, Canada
- Listed height: 6 ft 0 in (1.83 m)
- Listed weight: 185 lb (84 kg)

Career information
- College: Queen's University

Career history

Playing
- 1940: Saskatchewan Roughriders
- 1941–1942: Winnipeg Blue Bombers
- 1943: Saskatchewan Roughriders
- 1945: Ottawa Rough Riders
- 1946–1948: Saskatchewan Roughriders

Coaching
- 1946–1947: Saskatchewan Roughriders

General manager
- 1958–1978: Saskatchewan Roughriders

Awards and highlights
- 2× Grey Cup champion (1941, 1966)
- Canadian Football Hall of Fame

Kenneth Joseph Preston (October 19, 1917 – August 2, 1991) was a Canadian professional football player, coach and executive. He played for the Saskatchewan Roughriders (3 stints), Winnipeg Blue Bombers, and Ottawa Rough Riders. He was the head coach of the Saskatchewan Roughriders from 1946 to 1947. From 1958 to 1978, he was the Roughriders' general manager. He was inducted into the Saskatchewan Sports Hall of Fame in 1980 and the Canadian Football Hall of Fame in 1990. He also was inducted into the Roughriders' plaza of honor in 1987. From 1962 until his retirement in 1979, they made the playoffs every year.
