= Gregg Butler =

American gridiron football player (born 1952)

Profile
- Position: Defensive back

Personal information
- Born: December 26, 1952 (age 73); Washington, D.C., U.S.
- Listed height: 5 ft 10 in (1.78 m)
- Listed weight: 175 lb (79 kg)

Career information
- University: Howard University

Career history
- 1975: Philadelphia Bell
- 1977–1980: Edmonton Eskimos
- 1981: Montreal Alouettes
- 1982: Winnipeg Blue Bombers
- 1983: Washington Federals

Awards and highlights
- 3× Grey Cup champion (1978, 1979, 1980); 3× CFL West All-Star (1978, 1979, 1980)

Gregg Butler (born December 26, 1952) is an American former professional football player who played for the Philadelphia Bell, Edmonton Eskimos, Montreal Alouettes, Winnipeg Blue Bombers and Washington Federals. He played college football at Howard University and was inducted into The Howard University Athletic Hall of Fame in 2014. In 1979, Butler led the West in punt return yards with 623.
