= 1979 CFL season =

Canadian Football League season

- East champions: Montreal Alouettes
- West champions: Edmonton Eskimos

67th Grey Cup
- Date: November 25, 1979
- Venue: Olympic Stadium, Montreal
- Champions: Edmonton Eskimos

CFL seasons
- 1978 1980

Canadian Football League team locations: West, East

The 1979 CFL season is considered to be the 26th season in modern-day Canadian football, although it is officially the 22nd Canadian Football League season.

== CFL news in 1979 ==
The Edmonton Eskimos establishes a single season attendance record with 340,239 fans — the most by any Western Conference team.

== Regular season standings ==
West Division
Pos	Team	Pld	W	L	T	PF	PA	PD	Pts
1	Edmonton Eskimos (C, Q)	16	12	2	2	495	219	+276	26
2	Calgary Stampeders (Q)	16	12	4	0	382	278	+104	24
3	BC Lions (Q)	16	9	6	1	328	333	−5	19
4	Winnipeg Blue Bombers	16	4	12	0	283	340	−57	8
5	Saskatchewan Roughriders	16	2	14	0	194	437	−243	4

(C) First round bye; (Q) Qualified for playoffs

East Division
Pos	Team	Pld	W	L	T	PF	PA	PD	Pts
1	Montreal Alouettes (C, Q)	16	11	4	1	351	284	+67	23
2	Ottawa Rough Riders (Q)	16	8	6	2	349	315	+34	18
3	Hamilton Tiger-Cats (Q)	16	6	10	0	280	338	−58	12
4	Toronto Argonauts	16	5	11	0	234	352	−118	10

(C) First round bye; (Q) Qualified for playoffs

Edmonton and Montreal have first round byes.

== Grey Cup playoffs ==
The Edmonton Eskimos are the 1979 Grey Cup champions, defeating the Montreal Alouettes, 17–9, in front of their home crowd at Montreal's Olympic Stadium. This was Edmonton's second-straight championship. The Alouettes' David Green (RB) was named the Grey Cup's Most Valuable Player on Offence and Tom Cousineau (LB) was named the Grey Cup's Most Valuable Player on Defence, while Don Sweet (K) was named the Grey Cup's Most Valuable Canadian.

=== Playoff bracket ===
November 10/11: Division Semifinals
East
E3	Hamilton Tiger-Cats	26
E2	Ottawa Rough Riders	29
West
W3	BC Lions	2
W2	Calgary Stampeders	37

November 17/18: Division Finals
E2	Ottawa Rough Riders	6
E1	Montreal Alouettes	17
W2	Calgary Stampeders	7
W1	Edmonton Eskimos	19

November 25: 67th Grey Cup @ Olympic Stadium – Montreal, Quebec
E1	Montreal Alouettes	9
W1	Edmonton Eskimos	17

== CFL leaders ==
- CFL passing leaders
- CFL rushing leaders
- CFL receiving leaders

== 1979 CFL All-Stars ==
=== Offence ===
- QB – Tom Wilkinson, Edmonton Eskimos
- RB – David Green, Montreal Alouettes
- RB – Larry Key, BC Lions
- SB – Willie Armstead, Calgary Stampeders
- TE – Tony Gabriel, Ottawa Rough Riders
- WR – Waddell Smith, Edmonton Eskimos
- WR – Brian Kelly, Edmonton Eskimos
- C – Al Wilson, BC Lions
- OG – Ray Watrin, Montreal Alouettes
- OG – Larry Butler, Hamilton Tiger-Cats
- OT – Mike Wilson, Edmonton Eskimos
- OT – Lloyd Fairbanks, Calgary Stampeders

=== Defence ===
- DT – Dave Fennell, Edmonton Eskimos
- DT – John Helton, Winnipeg Blue Bombers
- DE – Junior Ah You, Montreal Alouettes
- DE – Reggie Lewis, Calgary Stampeders
- LB – Danny Kepley, Edmonton Eskimos
- LB – Ben Zambiasi, Hamilton Tiger-Cats
- LB – Ron Foxx, Ottawa Rough Riders
- DB – Dickie Harris, Montreal Alouettes
- DB – Mike Nelms, Ottawa Rough Riders
- DB – Gregg Butler, Edmonton Eskimos
- DB – Ed Jones, Edmonton Eskimos
- DB – Al Burleson, Calgary Stampeders

=== Special teams ===
- P – Hank Ilesic, Edmonton Eskimos
- K – Lui Passaglia, BC Lions

== 1979 Eastern All-Stars ==
=== Offence ===
- QB – Tom Clements, Hamilton Tiger-Cats
- RB – David Green, Montreal Alouettes
- RB – Terry Metcalf, Toronto Argonauts
- SB – Leif Pettersen, Hamilton Tiger-Cats
- TE – Tony Gabriel, Ottawa Rough Riders
- WR – Martin Cox, Ottawa Rough Riders
- WR – Bob Gaddis, Montreal Alouettes
- C – Doug Smith, Montreal Alouettes
- OG – Ray Watrin, Montreal Alouettes
- OG – Larry Butler, Hamilton Tiger-Cats
- OT – Nick Bastaja, Toronto Argonauts
- OT – Dan Yochum, Montreal Alouettes

=== Defence ===
- DT – Glen Weir, Montreal Alouettes
- DT – Mike Raines, Ottawa Rough Riders
- DE – Junior Ah You, Montreal Alouettes
- DE – Jim Corrigall, Toronto Argonauts
- LB – Carl Crennell, Montreal Alouettes
- LB – Ben Zambiasi, Hamilton Tiger-Cats
- LB – Ron Foxx, Ottawa Rough Riders
- DB – Dickie Harris, Montreal Alouettes
- DB – Mike Nelms, Ottawa Rough Riders
- DB – Jim Burrow, Montreal Alouettes
- DB – Tony Proudfoot, Montreal Alouettes
- DB – Billy Hardee, Toronto Argonauts

=== Special teams ===
- P – Ian Sunter, Toronto Argonauts
- K – Don Sweet, Montreal Alouettes

== 1979 Western All-Stars ==
=== Offence ===
- QB – Tom Wilkinson, Edmonton Eskimos
- RB – Jim Germany, Edmonton Eskimos
- RB – Larry Key, BC Lions
- SB – Willie Armstead, Calgary Stampeders
- TE – Harry Holt, BC Lions
- WR – Waddell Smith, Edmonton Eskimos
- WR – Brian Kelly, Edmonton Eskimos
- C – Al Wilson, BC Lions
- OG – Bill Stevenson, Edmonton Eskimos
- OG – Eric Upton, Edmonton Eskimos
- OT – Mike Wilson, Edmonton Eskimos
- OT – Lloyd Fairbanks, Calgary Stampeders

=== Defence ===
- DT – Dave Fennell, Edmonton Eskimos
- DT – John Helton, Winnipeg Blue Bombers
- DE – David Boone, Edmonton Eskimos
- DE – Reggie Lewis, Calgary Stampeders
- LB – Danny Kepley, Edmonton Eskimos
- LB – Glen Jackson, BC Lions
- LB – Tom Towns, Edmonton Eskimos
- DB – Terry Irvin, Calgary Stampeders
- DB – Ray Odums, Calgary Stampeders
- DB – Gregg Butler, Edmonton Eskimos
- DB – Ed Jones, Edmonton Eskimos
- DB – Al Burleson, Calgary Stampeders

=== Special teams ===
- P – Hank Ilesic, Edmonton Eskimos
- K – Lui Passaglia, BC Lions

== 1979 CFL awards ==
- CFL's Most Outstanding Player Award – David Green (RB), Montreal Alouettes
- CFL's Most Outstanding Canadian Award – Dave "Dr. Death" Fennell (DT), Edmonton Eskimos
- CFL's Most Outstanding Defensive Player Award – Ben Zambiasi (LB), Hamilton Tiger-Cats
- CFL's Most Outstanding Offensive Lineman Award – Mike Wilson (OT), Edmonton Eskimos
- CFL's Most Outstanding Rookie Award – Brian Kelly (WR), Edmonton Eskimos
- CFLPA's Outstanding Community Service Award – John Helton (DT), Winnipeg Blue Bombers
- CFL's Coach of the Year – Hugh Campbell, Edmonton Eskimos
