= Preston Young =

Canadian football player (born 1954)

Profile
- Position: Defensive back

Personal information
- Born: July 15, 1954 (age 72); Regina, Saskatchewan

Career information
- University: Simon Fraser

Career history
- 1978: Saskatchewan Roughriders
- 1979–1980, 1985: Toronto Argonauts
- 1981: Hamilton Tiger-Cats
- 1982–1985: Montreal Concordes

Preston Young (born July 14, 1954) was a football player in the CFL for eight years. Preston played defensive back for the Saskatchewan Roughriders, Toronto Argonauts, Hamilton Tiger-Cats and Montreal Concordes from 1978 to 1985. He played college football at Simon Fraser University.
