= David Boone =

American gridiron football player (1951–2005)

Dave Boone
No. 64
- Positions: Defensive end, Defensive lineman

Personal information
- Born: October 30, 1951; Detroit, Michigan, U.S.
- Died: March 26, 2005 (aged 53); Point Roberts, Washington, U.S.
- Listed height: 6 ft 3 in (1.91 m)
- Listed weight: 248 lb (112 kg)

Career information
- High school: Cass Technical (Detroit, Michigan)
- College: Eastern Michigan
- NFL draft: 1974: 11th round, 285th overall pick

Career history
- 1974: Minnesota Vikings
- 1975: BC Lions
- 1976: Hamilton Tiger-Cats
- 1977–1983: Edmonton Eskimos
- 1984: Toronto Argonauts

Awards and highlights
- 5× Grey Cup champion (1978–1982); Tom Pate Memorial Award (1982); CFL All-Star (1981); CFL West All-Star (1977, 1981)

Career NFL statistics
- Games played: 5
- Stats at Pro Football Reference

Humphrey David Boone Jr. (October 30, 1951 – March 26, 2005) was an All-Star Canadian Football League (CFL) defensive lineman, winner of five Grey Cups.

== Career ==
=== Rookie year ===
Boone graduated from Eastern Michigan University and was drafted by the Minnesota Vikings. He played 5 games in 1974, the year the team went to Super Bowl VIII.

=== Years in CFL ===
He moved on to Canada, playing with the BC Lions in 1975 (6 games) and the Hamilton Tiger-Cats in 1976.

He began an All-Star career with the Edmonton Eskimos in 1977, becoming a vital part of their famed "Alberta Crude" defence. He was a CFL all-star in 1981, a three-time West Division all-star (1977, 1979, 1981) and won 5 Grey Cup rings.

He finished his career playing 15 games for the Toronto Argonauts in 1984.

== Death ==
His body was discovered outside of his house in the resort community of Point Roberts, Washington. On November 19, 2008, the CBC Television show The Fifth Estate suggested that Boone, who killed himself after many years of depression, suffered from the effects of years of unreported head injuries from playing professional football. Teammates York Hentschel and Bill Stevenson are believed to have suffered from the same injuries. The David Boone Award was created in 2005 in memory of him David Boone died at the age of 53.
