= John Helton =

American gridiron football player (born 1947)

No. 77, 99
- Position: Defensive tackle

Personal information
- Born: May 23, 1947 (age 79)
- Listed height: 6 ft 3 in (1.91 m)
- Listed weight: 250 lb (113 kg)

Career information
- College: Arizona State
- NFL draft: 1969: 7th round, 157th overall pick

Career history
- 1969–1978: Calgary Stampeders
- 1979–1982: Winnipeg Blue Bombers

Awards and highlights
- Grey Cup champion (1971); CFL's Most Outstanding Defensive Player Award (1974); CFL's Most Outstanding Lineman Award (1972); 2× Norm Fieldgate Trophy (1974, 1979); DeMarco–Becket Memorial Trophy (1972); Tom Pate Memorial Award (1979); 9× CFL All-Star (1971–1976, 1978, 1979, 1982); 12× CFL West All-Star (1969–1976, 1978, 1979, 1981, 1982)
- Canadian Football Hall of Fame (Class of 1986)

John Helton (born 23 May 1947) is an American former professional football defensive tackle for the Calgary Stampeders from 1969 to 1978 and the Winnipeg Blue Bombers from 1979 to 1982 of the Canadian Football League (CFL).

== Early life and college ==
John Helton graduated from Captain Jack High School in Mount Union, Pennsylvania. Helton was selected in the seventh round of the 1969 NFL/AFL draft by the Buffalo Bills after a stellar career at Arizona State University, but opted to go to Canada.

== Professional career ==
Helton was a CFL-All Star 10 times in 14 years of play at defensive tackle. Helton won a Grey Cup with the Stampeders in 1971. He also lost the 58th Grey Cup in 1970 to the Montreal Alouettes on a very muddy field.

== Honors ==
Helton was inducted into the Canadian Football Hall of Fame in 1986. He was inducted into the Alberta Sports Hall of Fame and Museum in 1993. In November 2006, Helton was voted one of the CFL's Top 50 players (#12) of the league's modern era by Canadian sports network The Sports Network/TSN, with no defensive lineman being ahead of him.
