= John Henry White =

American gridiron football player (born 1955)

No. 20
- Position: Running back

Personal information
- Born: August 28, 1955 (age 71); Shreveport, Louisiana, U.S.

Career information
- College: Louisiana Tech
- NFL draft: 1978: 8th round, 195th overall pick

Career history
- 1978–1987: BC Lions

Awards and highlights
- Grey Cup champion (1985)

John Henry White (born August 28, 1955) is an American former professional football running back who played ten seasons in Canadian Football League (CFL) for the BC Lions. He was a part of the Lions 1985 Grey Cup winning team.

White played college football at Louisiana Tech University. He was enshrined in the Louisiana Tech University Athletic Hall of Fame, Class of 1995.
