= Mike Murphy (Canadian football) =

Canadian football player (born 1954)

Profile
- Position: Fullback

Personal information
- Born: July 6, 1954 (age 72)
- Listed height: 6 ft 1 in (1.85 m)
- Listed weight: 219 lb (99 kg)

Career information
- College: University of Ottawa

Career history
- 1977–80: Ottawa Rough Riders

Awards and highlights
- CFL All-Star (1978); Frank M. Gibson Trophy (1977)

Mike Murphy (born September 6, 1954) is a former award-winning Canadian Football League fullback.

== Career ==
A graduate of University of Ottawa, Murphy was a member of the famed 1975 Vanier Cup champion Ottawa Gee-Gees team. The Ottawa Rough Riders claimed him as a territorial exemption in the 1977 CFL draft. In his first CFL season, he rushed for 871 yards and caught 48 passes for another 483 yards, winning him the Frank M. Gibson Trophy as top rookie in the CFL East. He was also an All-Star in 1978. During 4 seasons he rushed for 1983 yards and caught 163 passes for 1634 yards, scoring 10 touchdowns. His 2 two point converts in a game against Edmonton on August 26, 1980 is still a CFL record.
