= David Green (running back, born 1953) =

American gridiron football player (born 1953)

No. 26
- Position: Running back

Personal information
- Born: September 7, 1953 (age 73); Jacksonville, North Carolina, U.S.
- Listed height: 5 ft 10 in (1.78 m)
- Listed weight: 200 lb (91 kg)

Career information
- High school: Richlands (Richlands, North Carolina)
- College: Edinboro

Career history
- 1978–1980: Montreal Alouettes
- 1981: Hamilton Tiger-Cats
- 1982: Cleveland Browns

Awards and highlights
- CFL All-Star (1979); CFL's Most Outstanding Player (1979); Grey Cup MVP (Offence) (67th Grey Cup); Edinboro University Hall of Fame (1988)
- Stats at Pro Football Reference

David Green (born September 7, 1953) is an American former professional gridiron football running back who played for both the Montreal Alouettes and Hamilton Tiger-Cats of the Canadian Football League (CFL) and the Cleveland Browns of the National Football League (NFL).

== Early life ==
Born September 7, 1953 in Jacksonville, North Carolina, he attended Richlands High School and Chowan Junior College in Murfreesboro, North Carolina. He then played football at Edinboro University in Edinboro, Pennsylvania. Playing in the Pennsylvania State Athletic Conference in 1975 and 1976, Green was named Honorable Mention All-American by the Associated Press and to the Conference All-Star team. In 19 games, he had a career average of 104 rushing yards per game at Edinboro.

He was inducted into the Edinboro Hall of Fame on April 30, 1988.

== Professional career ==
Green played with the Montreal Alouettes of the CFL for three seasons. He played 5 games in 1978, 16 games in 1979 and 14 games in 1980. He also played in two Grey Cup games: the 66th Grey Cup and 67th Grey Cup. His best year was 1979, when he rushed 287 times for 1,678 yards and he had nine 100 yard plus rushing games. His best day came on October 27, 1979, against the Ottawa Rough Riders, when he rushed 29 times for 212 yards. He also scored 3 touchdowns against the Toronto Argonauts on October 22, 1979. He was the CFL's Most Outstanding Player Award and an All Canadian all star that season. He was an All East division all star in 1980.

His best Grey Cup game was the 67th Grey Cup against the Edmonton Eskimos, when he led all players with 142 rushing yards (the third highest single game total) in a close loss. He won the Grey Cup Most Valuable Player award for this performance.

Following his all-star performance, he publicly announced his intention to bargain for a better Alouettes contract for the 1980 CFL season as his contract stated if he won the 1979 Most Outstanding Player Award, he could re-negotiate. In his dealings, he made public comments about seeking a million dollars, sought a trade with the Toronto Argonauts, and, in June 1980, even filed retirement papers to force the Alouettes hand, who stated Green would have to honour the original contract if a mutual agreement could not be reached. Finally, a deal was signed prior to the first regular season game.

Prior to the 1981 CFL season, new Alouettes owner Nelson Skalbania traded Green and Keith Baker to the Hamilton Tiger-Cats in exchange for the negotiating rights to Vince Ferragamo, which they held. Green was benched for the fourth quarter of a July game against the Calgary Stampeders after he insisted on taping up an injured ankle despite new head coach Frank Kush's outlawing of the practice of taping ankles and shoes.

In 1982, Green played for the Cleveland Browns of the NFL, during the strike shortened season, returning a single kickoff for 13 yards.
