= Ron Foxx =

Canadian football player (born 1951)

Profile
- Position: Linebacker

Personal information
- Born: May 2, 1951 (age 75); Gainesville, Florida, US
- Listed height: 6 ft 3 in (1.91 m)
- Listed weight: 220 lb (100 kg)

Career information
- College: Alabama A&M

Career history
- 1976–77, 81: Toronto Argonauts
- 1978–81: Ottawa Rough Riders
- 1981: Montreal Alouettes

Awards and highlights
- CFL East All-Star (1979, 1980)

Ronald E. Foxx (born May 2, 1951) is a Canadian football player who played professionally for the Montreal Alouettes, Ottawa Rough Riders and Toronto Argonauts. He began his career playing with the Birmingham Americans of the World Football League (WFL) and signed with Toronto in 1976. He won East All-Stars (1979 and 1980) and one CFL All-Star (1979).
