= Tom Wilkinson (Canadian football) =

American gridiron football player (born 1943)

No. 12, 16, 19
- Position: Quarterback

Personal information
- Born: January 4, 1943 (age 83); Ottumwa, Iowa, U.S.
- Listed height: 5 ft 11 in (1.80 m)
- Listed weight: 187 lb (85 kg)

Career information
- College: Wyoming

Career history

Playing
- 1967–1970: Toronto Argonauts
- 1971: BC Lions
- 1972–1981: Edmonton Eskimos

Coaching
- 1991–2000: University of Alberta

Awards and highlights
- 5× Grey Cup champion (1975, 1978–1981); 3× CFL All-Star (1974, 1978, 1979); 3× CFL West All-Star (1974, 1978, 1979); CFL MOP (1974); 2× Jeff Nicklin Memorial Trophy (1974, 1978); Grey Cup MVP (Offence) (1978); Edmonton Eskimos Wall of Honour (1982); Eskimos record, most interceptions thrown – career (126)
- Canadian Football Hall of Fame (Class of 1987)

Tom Wilkinson (born January 4, 1943) is an American former professional football quarterback best known for his time with the Edmonton Eskimos of the Canadian Football League (CFL), where he played on six Grey Cup-winning teams. He was a Western Conference and CFL all-star quarterback in 1974, 1978 and 1979 and won the CFL's Most Outstanding Player Award in 1974. Wilkinson has been inducted into the Canadian Football Hall of Fame.

== Early life ==
Wilkinson was born in Iowa and moved to Wyoming with his parents in 1945. Wilkinson played high school football in the small town of Greybull, Wyoming. He was scouted as both a football and baseball player out of high school.

== Football career ==
Wilkinson attended the University of Wyoming on a football scholarship and played baseball for Wyoming. After graduation, he was signed as a quarterback by the Toronto Rifles of the Continental Football League. He played 16 games for the Rifles in 1966 and 1967, throwing the ball 287 times for 141 completions with 1,952 yards, 11 interceptions and 18 touchdowns. It was during 1967 he moved to the Toronto Argonauts of the Canadian Football League as a backup quarterback. He was the team's leading quarterback in 1969 throwing for 2,041 yards. In 1970, Wilkinson made way for Don Jonas to lead the Argos, but still got enough playing time to throw for 1,272 yards. Traded to the BC Lions in 1971, he played there for a year before being released prior to the 1972 CFL season. He was picked up by the Edmonton Eskimos and played well enough in the remaining pre-season games to make the team as a backup, but by season's end he was their top passer with 2,475 yards in which he completed 177 out of 268. Wilkinson, known affectionately as "Wilkie" by Eskimo fans had amongst his talents an uncanny knack for drawing members of the opposing line "offside" pretty much at will. It was 5 yards you could all but rely on. A small man in a big man's game he used guile as much as athleticism to make the big plays and win championships. He played the balance of his career in Eskimo Green and Gold in a two-quarterback system, first with Bruce Lemmerman and then with Warren Moon. After his first professional seasons, when he had been considered especially injury-prone, Wilkinson did not miss a single game during his 10 years with the Eskimos.

He first led the Eskimos to a Grey Cup victory in 1975, after losses in the championship game in 1973 and 1974. After quarterbacking the Eskimos during one more Grey Cup loss in 1977, Wilkinson became part of the 5-time Grey Cup champion Eskimo dynasty from 1978 through 1981, the last two years acting as a backup to Moon.

Including his time with the Rifles, Wilkinson threw for 24,531 passing yards on 1754 completions from 2,949 attempts and with 137 interceptions to 172 touchdowns. Although not known for his running abilities he also added 1,250 rushing yards on 352 runs with 13 touchdowns.

He retired after the Eskimos' 1981 Grey Cup Championship year. Wilkinson was the first player honoured on the Edmonton Eskimo's "Wall of Fame" at Commonwealth Stadium in 1982.

== After retirement ==
After retiring, Wilkinson went to work full-time as an ad salesman for the Edmonton radio station CHQT, which had employed him since his first season with the Eskimos. He was a consultant to Eskimos head coach Jackie Parker after he replaced Pete Kettela during the 1983 season, but chose not to return the following year. He was elected to the Canadian Football Hall of Fame as a Player on May 2, 1987. He was the head coach of the University of Alberta Golden Bears from 1990 to 2000. In 2004, he was announced as the first president of the North American Indoor Football League, a Canadian indoor football league that folded before any games had been played.

In 2012, Canada Post used his image on a series of postage stamps commemorating the 100th Grey Cup. That image was also used on presentation posters and other promotional materials associated with the centennial.
