= Willie Armstead =

American gridiron football player (born 1952)

No. 18
- Position: Slotback; Wide receiver

Personal information
- Born: April 10, 1952 (age 74); Newport News, Virginia, U.S.

Career information
- College: Utah (1971-1974)
- NFL draft: 1975: 13th round, 317 (By the Cleveland Browns)th overall pick

Career history
- 1976–1982: Calgary Stampeders

Awards and highlights
- 3× CFL All-Star (1978, 1979, 1982)

Willie Armstead (born April 10, 1952) is a former slotback and wide receiver who played seven seasons in the Canadian Football League (CFL) for the Calgary Stampeders.

He is a native of Newport News, Virginia, a 1971 graduate of Newport News High School and a 1975 graduate of the University of Utah. He was named to the All-star team in 1978, 1979 and 1982.

He never played in the NFL, but was drafted to the Cleveland Browns in the 13th round of the 1975 NFL draft, and then signed as a free agent with the New England Patriots in 1976.
