= Ray Watrin =

Canadian gridiron football player (born 1945)

Profile
- Positions: Guard, tackle

Personal information
- Born: February 1, 1945 (age 81); Okotoks, Alberta, Canada

Career information
- College: Utah State

Career history
- 1969: Calgary Stampeders
- 1970: British Columbia Lions
- 1970–1974: Winnipeg Blue Bombers
- 1974–1980: Montreal Alouettes
- 1980: Ottawa Rough Riders

Awards and highlights
- 2× Grey Cup champion (1974, 1977); Leo Dandurand Trophy (1979); CFL All-Star (1979)

Ray Watrin

Municipal councillor in Okotoks
- Incumbent
- Assumed office October 25, 2010

Personal details
- Born: February 1, 1945 (age 81)
- Citizenship: Canadian

Ray Watrin (born February 1, 1945) is a Canadian former professional football offensive lineman who played 12 seasons in the Canadian Football League (CFL) for five different teams. He won the Leo Dandurand Trophy in 1979 and also was named CFL All-Star that season, and was a part of a Grey Cup championship team with the Montreal Alouettes in 1974 and 1977. Watrin played college football at Utah State University.

After retiring from professional football, Watrin returned to his home town of Okotoks, Alberta to coach football and teach math at Foothills Composite High School. He also coached the Calgary Colts in the Canadian Junior Football League (CJFL) and coached in a Canadian Women's football league

In 2009, he retired from his post at Foothills Composite High School, and in 2010 he ran for Okotoks Town Council, he won by a slim margin.
