= Bill Stevenson (offensive lineman) =

Canadian gridiron football player (1951–2007)

No. 62
- Positions: Offensive tackle, Guard

Personal information
- Born: June 4, 1951; High Prairie, Alberta, Canada
- Died: March 19, 2007 (aged 55); Edmonton, Alberta, Canada

Career information
- College: Drake
- NFL draft: 1974: 4th round, 104th overall pick

Career history
- 1974–1975: Memphis Southmen
- 1975–1988: Edmonton Eskimos

Awards and highlights
- 7× Grey Cup champion (1975, 1978–1982, 1987); CFL West All-Star (1981)

Bill Stevenson (June 4, 1951 – March 19, 2007) was a Canadian Football League (CFL) player with the Edmonton Eskimos. After playing college football at Drake University, he was drafted by the NFL's Miami Dolphins and played in the World Football League (WFL) with the Memphis Southmen for two seasons, followed by a 14-year CFL career with the Eskimos, the first three as a defensive lineman and the remainder as an offensive lineman. He was named CFL All-Star two times and was a part of a CFL record seven Grey Cup championship teams with the Eskimos.

After his playing career ended, Stevenson struggled in his business and personal life, suffered through bankruptcy and divorce, and was forced to take refuge in shelters for the homeless. Bill Stevenson died on March 19th, 2007 after being killed in an accident when he slipped and fell backwards down the stairs in his mother's home in Edmonton. Bill Stevenson was just 55 years old.

On November 19, 2008, the CBC Television show The Fifth Estate suggested that Stevenson, who went through years of alcohol abuse and destitution, enduring the effects of years of unreported head injuries from playing professional football. Teammates York Hentschel and David Boone are believed to have had the same injuries.
