= Leon Lyszkiewicz =

Canadian football defensive lineman

Profile
- Position: Defensive tackle

Personal information
- Born: June 11, 1955 (age 71); Grande Prairie, Alberta, Canada
- Listed height: 6 ft 2 in (1.88 m)
- Listed weight: 240 lb (109 kg)

Career information
- University: Alberta

Career history
- 1977: Saskatchewan Roughriders
- 1978–1979: Winnipeg Blue Bombers
- 1980–1982: Toronto Argonauts
- 1983: Edmonton Eskimos
- 1984–1986: Hamilton Tiger-Cats

Awards and highlights
- Grey Cup champion (1986)

Leon Lyszkiewicz (born June 11, 1955 in Grande Prairie, Alberta) is a Canadian former professional football defensive lineman who played ten seasons in the Canadian Football League (CFL) for five different teams.

Lyszkiewicz played CIS football for the Alberta Golden Bears at the University of Alberta from 1973 to 1977. He was drafted by the Edmonton Eskimos in the 1977 college draft, but was released, and was signed Saskatchewan Roughriders later in the year. He played one game for them, and then for the Winnipeg Blue Bombers for two seasons. In 1980, he was traded to the Toronto Argonauts and played for them until he was traded to the Eskimos during the 1983-4 season. He played for the Hamilton Tiger-Cats from 1984 to 1986. After participating in several losing Grey Cup teams, he won a Grey Cup with the Tiger-Cats in 1986, his last season.
