= North Carolina Virtual Public School =

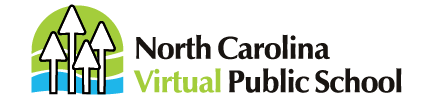

Location
- North Carolina; United States

Information
- Other name: NC Virtual
- School type: State public online school
- Established: 2005 (20 years ago)
- School board: North Carolina State Board of Education
- Website: ncvps.org

North Carolina Virtual Public School (NCVPS) is the state-run online class program in North Carolina. As of 2017 the system was the second largest online class program in the United States. NCVPS began classes in 2007 and has enrolled 430,000 students since then. It is often used in schools where a face-to-face teacher is unavailable, but is available at no cost to all students in North Carolina who are enrolled in North Carolina's public schools. In January 2020 NCVPS redesigned its website with the intent of making it easier for students to navigate.
