= Saskatchewan Roughriders football, 1970–79 =

Contents:	1970 – 1971 – 1972 – 1973 – 1974 – 1975 – 1976 – 1977 – 1978 – 1979

== 1970 ==
=== Awards and honours ===
- CFL's Most Outstanding Player Award – Ron Lancaster
- Jeff Nicklin Memorial Trophy – Ron Lancaster

== 1971 ==
1971 Saskatchewan Roughriders season
- General manager: Ken Preston
- Head coach: Dave Skrien
- Home stadium: Taylor Field

Results
- Record: 9–6–1
- Division place: 2nd, West
- Playoffs: Lost Western Final

The Roughriders offence had 282 points for, while the defence had 329 points allowed

=== Schedule ===
Week	Game	Date	Opponent	Results		Venue	Attendance
Week	Game	Date	Opponent	Score	Record	Venue	Attendance
1	1	Tue, July 27	at BC Lions	W 0–21	1–0	Empire Stadium	30,492
1	2	Fri, July 30	Calgary Stampeders	L 0–21	0–2	Taylor Field	16,000
	13	Mon, Oct 11	Calgary Stampeders	W 24–17	8–5	McMahon Stadium	23,616
	14	Sun, Oct 17	vs. Calgary Stampeders	T 7–7	8–5–1	Taylor Field	21,706

==== Postseason ====
Round	Date	Opponent	Results		Venue	Attendance
Round	Date	Opponent	Score	Record	Venue	Attendance
West Semi-Final		Winnipeg Blue Bombers	W 34–23	1–0	Taylor Field	14,488
West Final Game 1		Calgary Stampeders	L 21–30	1–1	McMahon Stadium	33,616
West Final Game 2		Calgary Stampeders	L 21–23	1–2	Taylor Field	14,588

=== Awards and honours ===
- George Reed, Running Back, CFL All-Star, Offence
- Jack Abendschan, Guard, CFL All-Star, Offence

== 1972 ==
1972 Saskatchewan Roughriders season
- General manager: Ken Preston
- Head coach: Dave Skrien
- Home stadium: Taylor Field

Results
- Record: 8–8
- Division place: 3rd, West
- Playoffs: Lost Grey Cup

The Roughriders offence had 306 points for, while the defence had 251 points allowed

=== Schedule ===
==== Postseason ====
Round	Date	Opponent	Results		Venue	Attendance
Round	Date	Opponent	Score	Record	Venue	Attendance
West Semifinal		at Edmonton Eskimos	W 8–6	1–0	Clarke Stadium	15,773
West Final		at Winnipeg Blue Bombers	W 27–24	2–0	Winnipeg Stadium	19,534
Grey Cup		at Hamilton Tiger-Cats	L 10–13	2–1	Ivor Wynne Stadium	33,993

=== Awards and honours ===
- George Reed, Running Back, CFL All-Star, Offence
- Jack Abendschan, Guard, CFL All-Star, Offence

== 1973 ==
1973 Saskatchewan Roughriders season
- General manager: Ken Preston
- Head coach: John Payne
- Home stadium: Taylor Field

Results
- Record: 10–6
- Division place: 2nd, West
- Playoffs: Lost Western Final

The Roughriders offence had 315 points for, while the defence had 280 points allowed

=== Schedule ===
Week	Game	Date	Opponent	Results		Venue	Attendance
Week	Game	Date	Opponent	Score	Record	Venue	Attendance

==== Postseason ====
Round	Date	Opponent	Results		Venue	Attendance
Round	Date	Opponent	Score	Record	Venue	Attendance
West Semifinal		BC Lions	W 33–13	1–0		
West Final		Edmonton Eskimos	L 23–25	1–1		

== 1974 ==
1974 Saskatchewan Roughriders season
- General manager: Ken Preston
- Head coach: John Payne
- Home stadium: Taylor Field

Results
- Record: 9–7
- Division place: 2nd, West
- Playoffs: Lost Western Final

The Roughriders offence had 271 points for, while the defence had 258 points allowed

=== Schedule ===
Week	Game	Date	Opponent	Results		Venue	Attendance
Week	Game	Date	Opponent	Score	Record	Venue	Attendance

==== Postseason ====
Round	Date	Opponent	Results		Venue	Attendance
Round	Date	Opponent	Score	Record	Venue	Attendance
West Semifinal		BC Lions	W 24–14	1–0		
West Final		Edmonton Eskimos	L 27–31	1–1		

== 1975 ==
1975 Saskatchewan Roughriders season
- General manager: Ken Preston
- Head coach: John Payne
- Home stadium: Taylor Field

Results
- Record: 10–5–1
- Division place: 2nd, West
- Playoffs: Lost Western Final

The Roughriders offence had 349 points for, while the defence had 294 points allowed

=== Schedule ===
Week	Game	Date	Opponent	Results		Venue	Attendance
Week	Game	Date	Opponent	Score	Record	Venue	Attendance

==== Postseason ====
Round	Date	Opponent	Results		Venue	Attendance
Round	Date	Opponent	Score	Record	Venue	Attendance
West Semifinal		Winnipeg Blue Bombers	W 42–24	1–0		
West Final		Edmonton Eskimos	L 18–30	1–1		

== 1976 ==
1976 Saskatchewan Roughriders season
- General manager: Ken Preston
- Head coach: John Payne
- Home stadium: Taylor Field

Results
- Record: 11–5
- Division place: 1st, West
- Playoffs: Lost Grey Cup

The Roughriders offence had 361 points for, while the defence had 221 points allowed. This is the most recent season (as of 2016) where the Roughriders finished first overall in the CFL.

=== Schedule ===
Week	Game	Date	Opponent	Results		Venue	Attendance
Week	Game	Date	Opponent	Score	Record	Venue	Attendance

==== Postseason ====
Round	Date	Opponent	Results		Venue	Attendance
Round	Date	Opponent	Score	Record	Venue	Attendance
West Final		Edmonton Eskimos	W 23–13	1–0		
64th Grey Cup		Ottawa Rough Riders	L 20–23	1–1		

=== Grey Cup ===
Teams	1 Q	2 Q	3 Q	4 Q	Final
Ottawa Rough Riders	10	0	3	10	23
Saskatchewan Roughriders	0	17	3	0	20

== 1977 ==
1977 Saskatchewan Roughriders season
- General manager: Ken Preston
- Head coach: Jim Eddy
- Home stadium: Taylor Field

Results
- Record: 8–8
- Division place: 4th, West
- Playoffs: Did not qualify

The Roughriders offence had 227 points for, while the defence had 305 points allowed

=== Schedule ===
Week	Game	Date	Opponent	Results		Venue	Attendance
Week	Game	Date	Opponent	Score	Record	Venue	Attendance

=== Awards and honours ===
- CFLPA's Most Outstanding Community Service Award – Ron Lancaster

== 1978 ==
1978 Saskatchewan Roughriders season
- General manager: Ken Preston
- Head coach: Jim Eddy, Walt Posadowski
- Home stadium: Taylor Field

Results
- Record: 4–11–1
- Division place: 5th, West
- Playoffs: Did not qualify

The Roughriders offence had 330 points for, while the defence had 459 points allowed

=== Schedule ===
Week	Game	Date	Opponent	Results		Venue	Attendance
Week	Game	Date	Opponent	Score	Record	Venue	Attendance

== 1979 ==
1979 Saskatchewan Roughriders season
- General manager: Ken Preston
- Head coach: Ron Lancaster
- Home stadium: Taylor Field

Results
- Record: 2–14
- Division place: 5th, West
- Playoffs: Did not qualify

The Roughriders offence scored 194 points while the defence allowed 437 points. In May 1979, the Ottawa Rough Riders traded Tom Clements to the Saskatchewan Roughriders. Ron Lancaster became Saskatchewan's head coach but found "the glorious fifties and sixties were over, and he was the first Roughrider coach in sixteen years who did not have Ron Lancaster at quarterback." The Green Riders finished 2–14, including the worst start to a season in club history, going 0-12 before winning their first game.

=== Schedule ===
Week	Game	Date	Opponent	Results		Venue	Attendance
Week	Game	Date	Opponent	Score	Record	Venue	Attendance
1	1	Wed, July 11	vs. BC Lions	L 4–28	0–1	Taylor Field	19,030
2	2	Tue, July 17	at Edmonton Eskimos	L 20–52	0–2	Commonwealth Stadium	43,321
3	3	Wed, July 25	vs. Hamilton Tiger-Cats	L 20–24	0–3	Taylor Field	19,759
4	4	Tue, July 31	at BC Lions	L 15–24	0–4	Empire Stadium	23,308
5	Bye						
6	5	Wed, Aug 15	at Toronto Argonauts	L 12–21	0–5	Exhibition Stadium	41,251
7	6	Wed, Aug 22	vs. Calgary Stampeders	L 5–6	0–6	Taylor Field	20,790
8	7	Tue, Aug 28	at Winnipeg Blue Bombers	L 1–30	0–7	Winnipeg Stadium	25,159
8	8	Mon, Sept 3					
9	9	Sun, Sept 9					
10	10	Sun, Sept 16					
11	11	Sun, Sept 23					
12	Bye						
13	12	Sun, Oct 7					
14	13	Sun, Oct 14					
15	14	Sun, Oct 21					
16	15	Sun, Oct 28					
17	16	Sun, Nov 4					
