= Waddell Smith =

American gridiron football player (1953–2024)

No. 71, 83, 86
- Position: WR

Personal information
- Born: August 24, 1953; New Orleans, Louisiana, U.S.
- Died: July 26, 2024 (aged 70)

Career information
- College: Kansas
- NFL draft: 1977: 8th round, 215th overall pick

Career history
- 1977–1983: Edmonton Eskimos
- 1984: Dallas Cowboys (NFL)

Awards and highlights
- 5× Grey Cup champion (1978−1982); Jeff Nicklin Memorial Trophy (1979); CFL All-Star (1979)
- Stats at Pro Football Reference

James Waddell Smith (August 24, 1953 – July 26, 2024) was an American-born football player for the Edmonton Eskimos of the Canadian Football League (CFL) where he played for seven seasons from 1977 to 1983. He was an All-Star in 1979 and was a part of five Grey Cup championship teams for the Eskimos. He finished his career in the NFL playing two games for the Dallas Cowboys in 1984.

Smith was an All-American sprinter for the Kansas Jayhawks track and field team, finishing runner-up in the 600 yards at the 1975 NCAA Indoor Track and Field Championships.

Smith died on July 26, 2024, at the age of 70.
