= 67th Grey Cup =

1979 Canadian Football championship game

Edmonton Eskimos	Montreal Alouettes
(12–2–2)	(11–4–1)
17	9
Head coach: Hugh Campbell	Head coach: Joe Scannella
	1	2	3	4	Total
Edmonton Eskimos	7	0	10	0	17
Montreal Alouettes	3	3	3	0	9
- Date: November 25, 1979
- Stadium: Olympic Stadium
- Location: Montreal
- Most Valuable Player: David Green, RB (Alouettes); Tom Cousineau, LB (Alouettes)
- Most Valuable Canadian: Don Sweet, K (Alouettes)
- National anthem: Roger Doucet
- Referee: Lorne Woods
- Attendance: 65,113

Broadcasters
- Network: CBC, CTV, SRC

The 67th Grey Cup was played on November 25, 1979 before 65,113 fans at Olympic Stadium in Montreal. The Edmonton Eskimos defeated the Montreal Alouettes 17–9.

== Box Score ==
First quarter

Edmonton - TD – Waddell Smith 43 yard pass from Tom Wilkinson (Dave Cutler convert)
Montreal – FG – Don Sweet 38 yards

Second quarter

Montreal – FG – Don Sweet 45 yards

Third quarter

Montreal – FG – Don Sweet 29 yards
Edmonton - TD – Tom Scott 33 yard pass from Warren Moon (Dave Cutler convert)
Edmonton – FG – Dave Cutler 38 yards

Fourth quarter

No scoring

Teams	1 Q	2 Q	3 Q	4 Q	Final
Edmonton Eskimos	7	0	10	0	17
Montreal Alouettes	3	3	3	0	9

== Trivia ==
Unlike previous Grey Cups, especially the 65th Grey Cup (or Ice Bowl) in 1977 in Montreal, the temperature was a balmy 12 degrees Celsius.

The Alouettes were penalized 16 times in the game, the most back-breaking call coming late in the fourth quarter when Gerry Dattilio was called for clipping on an 85-yard punt return for a touchdown by Keith Baker. Edmonton had only four penalties.

Despite winning the game, the Eskimos were shut out of the Most Valuable Player and Most Valuable Canadian awards, all of which went to Alouette players.

Edmonton and Montreal have met in 11 Grey Cup clashes. The Eskimos prevailed in 1954, 1955, 1956, 1975, 1978, 1979, 2003 and 2005's overtime thriller. The Als were victorious in 1974, the Ice Bowl of 1977, and 2002.

As of 2025, the 1979 game is the last Grey Cup in which a team was held to a single-digit point total.
