= 1973 BC Lions season =

Canadian football team season

- General manager: Jackie Parker
- Head coach: Eagle Keys
- Home stadium: Empire Stadium

Results
- Record: 5–9–2
- Division place: 3rd, West
- Playoffs: Lost Western Semi-Final

Uniform

The 1973 BC Lions finished in third place in the Western Conference with a 5–9–2 record. They beat the Calgary Stampeders in the final game of the regular season to make the playoffs. However, the Lions would lose to Saskatchewan in the Western Semi-Final 33–13.

In April, the Lions traded star fullback Jim Evenson to Ottawa. This would result in more carries for sophomore Johnny Musso, star running back from University of Alabama, who the Lions outbid the Chicago Bears of the NFL in 1972. Musso didn't disappoint as he ran for 1029 yards in 1973, had 475 yards receiving and scored 10 touchdowns.

Third year starting quarterback Don Moorhead split time with back-up Karl Douglas as the Lions tried to find the solution to their stagnant offence which produced only 16.3 points per game. In aggregate, both quarterbacks could only generate eight touchdowns through the air all season.

Sophomore linebacker Ray Nettles won the Schenley award for Most Outstanding Defensive Player and was the only Lion named to the CFL all-star team.

Linebacker Greg Findlay retired after 12 seasons and 178 games for the Lions.

== Offseason ==
=== CFL draft ===
Round	Pick	Player	Position	School

== Preseason ==
Game	Date	Opponent	Results		Venue	Attendance
Game	Date	Opponent	Score	Record	Venue	Attendance

== Regular season ==
=== Season standings ===
Western Football Conference
Team	GP	W	L	T	PF	PA	Pts
Edmonton Eskimos	16	9	5	2	329	284	20
Saskatchewan Roughriders	16	10	6	0	360	287	20
BC Lions	16	5	9	2	261	328	12
Calgary Stampeders	16	6	10	0	214	368	12
Winnipeg Blue Bombers	16	4	11	1	267	315	9

=== Season schedule ===
Game	Date	Opponent	Results	
Game	Date	Opponent	Score	Record
1	July 31	vs. Saskatchewan Roughriders	L 5–21	0–1
2	Aug 8	at Saskatchewan Roughriders	L 19–38	0–2
3	Aug 14	vs. Edmonton Eskimos	W 30–11	1–2
4	Aug 22	at Winnipeg Blue Bombers	W 23–19	2–2
5	Aug 28	vs. Calgary Stampeders	W 9–2	3–2
6	Sept 3	at Hamilton Tiger-Cats	L 24–44	3–3
7	Sept 5	at Ottawa Rough Riders	L 24–26	3–4
8	Sept 11	vs. Montreal Alouettes	L 7–10	3–5
9	Sept 18	vs. Winnipeg Blue Bombers	L 13–33	3–6
10	Sept 23	at Calgary Stampeders	L 12–13	3–7
11	Sept 29	vs. Toronto Argonauts	T 22–22	3–7–1
12	Oct 7	at Saskatchewan Roughriders	L 9–24	3–8–1
13	Oct 13	vs. Edmonton Eskimos	L 13–27	3–9–1
14	Oct 20	at Edmonton Eskimos	T 14–14	3–9–2
15	Oct 28	at Winnipeg Blue Bombers	W 22–17	4–9–2
16	Nov 3	vs. Calgary Stampeders	W 15–7	5–9–2

== Playoffs ==
Team	Q1	Q2	Q3	Q4	Total
BC Lions	?	?	?	?	13
Saskatchewan Roughriders	?	?	?	?	33

=== Offensive leaders ===
Player	Passing yds	Rushing yds	Receiving yds	TD
Don Moorhead	2005	283	0	0
Karl Douglas	1020	88	0	1
Johnny Musso		1029	475	10
Lou Harris		482	416	6
Monroe Eley		373	338	3
Jim Young		49	719	3
Lefty Hendrickson		0	631	3

== Roster ==
1973 BC Lions final roster
Quarterbacks: 16 Karl Douglas; 12 Eric Guthrie P; 27 Don Moorhead; Running backs: 26 Monroe Eley; 35 Ted Gerela K; 31 Lou Harris; 22 Johnny Musso; Wide receivers: 17 Brock Aynsley; 21 Ross Clarkson; 74 Slade Willis; 30 Jim Young; Tight ends: 71 Lefty Hendrickson	Offensive linemen: 54 Steve Beyrle T; 66 Trev Ekdahl G; 68 Mike LaHood G; 62 Layne McDowell T; 40 Gus Revenberg C; 60 Brian Sopatyk G; 61 Curtis Wester T; 58 Ted Wheeler T; 52 Al Wilson C; Defensive linemen: 79 Greg Findlay DE; 64 Garrett Hunsperger DT; 65 Bud Magrum DT; 67 Gary Robinson DT; 78 Mike Samples DT; 69 Mike Walker DE	Linebackers: 77 George Anderson; 51 Ray Nettles; 70 Pete Palmer; 55 Carl Weathers; Defensive backs: 10 Barry Ardern; 11 Brian Donnelly; 14 Joe Fourqurean; 25 Bob Friend; 18 Rocky Long; 15 Wayne Matherne; 24 Mike Wilson; Special teams: 76 Ivan MacMillan K; Italics indicate International player

== Awards and records ==
- CFL's Most Outstanding Lineman Award – Ray Nettles (LB)

=== 1973 CFL All-Stars ===
- LB – Ray Nettles, CFL All-Star
