= 1974 BC Lions season =

Canadian football team season

- General manager: Jackie Parker
- Head coach: Eagle Keys
- Home stadium: Empire Stadium

Results
- Record: 8–8
- Division place: 3rd, West
- Playoffs: Lost Western Semi-Final

The 1974 BC Lions finished in third place in the Western Conference with an 8–8 record and appeared in the Western Semi-Final.

Running back Johnny Musso was injured early in the season and played only three games. However, backups Lou Harris and Monroe Eley took advantage of their opportunity. Harris had 1232 yards rushing, 532 receiving, league best 12 touchdowns and was named to the CFL all-star team. Eley also rushed for over a thousand yards (1176) giving the Lions one of the best single season running games in CFL history.

Don Moorhead continued to be the starting quarterback and threw for 2468 yards passing and 17 touchdown passes. However, Moorhead injured his knee and hand late in the season, and General Manager Jackie Parker traded for veteran quarterback Pete Liske in October as insurance. The Lions lost their final four games of the season, however, still made the final playoff spot via tiebreaker. In the Western Semi-Final, the Lions fell to Saskatchewan by a score of 24–14 (the Roughriders won all four games against the Lions in 1974).

Annis Stukus was elected to the Canadian Football Hall of Fame in the Builder category.

The Lions changed their jersey to short sleeves and all white numbers at home

== Offseason ==
=== CFL draft ===
Round	Pick	Player	Position	School

== Preseason ==
Game	Date	Opponent	Results		Venue	Attendance
Game	Date	Opponent	Score	Record	Venue	Attendance
A	Tue, July 2	vs. Edmonton Eskimos	W 42–18	1–0	Empire Stadium	16,268
B	Sun, July 7	at Hamilton Tiger-Cats	L 23–25	1–1	Ivor Wynne Stadium	21,158
C	Wed, July 10	at Ottawa Rough Riders	L 27–28	1–2	Lansdowne Park	12,221
D	Tue, July 16	vs. Toronto Argonauts	L 15–21	1–3	Empire Stadium	15,835

== Regular season ==
=== Season standings ===
Western Football Conference
Team	GP	W	L	T	PF	PA	Pts
Edmonton Eskimos	16	10	5	1	345	247	21
Saskatchewan Roughriders	16	9	7	0	305	289	18
BC Lions	16	8	8	0	306	299	16
Winnipeg Blue Bombers	16	8	8	0	258	350	16
Calgary Stampeders	16	6	10	0	285	305	12

=== Season schedule ===
Week	Date	Opponent	Results	
Week	Date	Opponent	Score	Record
1	July 25	vs. Calgary Stampeders	W 23–20	1–0
2	July 31	at Winnipeg Blue Bombers	W 29–22	2–0
3	Aug 8	vs. Winnipeg Blue Bombers	W 26–6	3–0
4	Aug 14	at Calgary Stampeders	L 18–20	3–1
5	Aug 22	vs. Ottawa Rough Riders	L 4–9	3–2
6	Aug 27	at Edmonton Eskimos	W 21–15	4–2
7	Sept 7	vs. Saskatchewan Roughriders	L 16–38	4–3
8	Sept 12	at Toronto Argonauts	W 26–24	5–3
9	Sept 15	at Montreal Alouettes	L 12–31	5–4
10	Sept 21	vs. Winnipeg Blue Bombers	W 28–10	6–4
11	Sept 29	vs. Hamilton Tiger-Cats	W 32–10	7–4
12	Oct 6	at Calgary Stampeders	W 20–7	8–4
13	Oct 13	at Saskatchewan Roughriders	L 15–17	8–5
14	Oct 19	vs. Saskatchewan Roughriders	L 21–24	8–6
15	Oct 26	at Edmonton Eskimos	L 8–31	8–7
16	Nov 2	vs. Edmonton Eskimos	L 7–15	8–8

== Playoffs ==
Team	Q1	Q2	Q3	Q4	Total
BC Lions	7	0	0	7	14
Saskatchewan Roughriders	0	14	7	3	24

=== Offensive leaders ===
Player	Passing yds	Rushing yds	Receiving yds	TD
Don Moorhead	2478	204	0	3
Lou Harris		1239	532	12
Monroe Eley		1176	321	8
Jim Young		36	610	5
Brock Aynsley		0	453	0
Slade Willis		0	443	5

== Roster ==
1974 BC Lions final roster
Quarterbacks: 12 Pete Liske; 27 Don Moorhead; Running backs: 36 Terry Bailey; 26 Monroe Eley; 31 Lou Harris; 22 Johnny Musso; Wide receivers: 17 Brock Aynsley; 18 Dave Kaduhr; 74 Slade Willis P; 30 Jim Young; Tight ends: 71 Lefty Hendrickson; 77 Tony Moro	Offensive linemen: 55 Lanny Boleski T; 68 Mike LaHood G; 62 Layne McDowell T; 50 Brian Sopatyk G; 61 Curtis Wester G/T; 52 Al Wilson C; Defensive linemen: 76 Bill Baker DE; 69 Elton Brown DE; 64 Garrett Hunsperger DT; 67 Gary Robinson DT; 60 Don Wunderly DE; Special teams: 76 Ivan MacMillan K	Linebackers: 72 Dan Dever OLB; 51 Ray Nettles MLB; 70 Pete Palmer OLB; 79 Lorne Watters OLB; Defensive backs: 10 Barry Ardern; 32 Grady Cavness; 14 Joe Fourqurean; 21 Bob Hornes; 15 Wayne Matherne; Italics indicate Import player

== Awards and records ==
=== 1974 CFL All-Stars ===
- RB – Lou Harris, CFL All-Star
- OG – Curtis Wester, CFL All-Star
