= 1975 BC Lions season =

Canadian football team season

- General manager: Jackie Parker; Bob Ackles
- Head coach: Eagle Keys; Cal Murphy
- Home stadium: Empire Stadium

Results
- Record: 6–10
- Division place: 5th, West
- Playoffs: did not qualify

Uniform

The 1975 BC Lions finished in fifth place in the Western Conference with a 6–10 record and failed to make the playoffs.

With Don Moorhead injured, Peter Liske took most of the snaps during the season for the Lions. The club had a terrible start to the season going 1–5 in their first six games and on August 29 the Board of Directors finally fired both General Manager Jackie Parker and Head Coach Eagle Keys.

Bob Ackles was promoted to General Manager and Ackles elevated Cal Murphy to Head Coach. The club went 5-5 in the remaining part of the season, however, they did not get out of last place in the Western Conference.

Despite the poor season by the club, three Lions made the CFL all-star team: Centre Al Wilson, Defensive End Bill Baker and linebacker Larry Cameron.

Byron Bailey was elected to the Football Hall of Fame.

== Offseason ==
=== CFL draft ===
Round	Pick	Player	Position	School

== Preseason ==
Game	Date	Opponent	Results		Venue	Attendance
Game	Date	Opponent	Score	Record	Venue	Attendance

== Regular season ==
=== Season standings ===
Western Football Conference
Team	GP	W	L	T	PF	PA	Pts
Edmonton Eskimos	16	12	4	0	432	370	24
Saskatchewan Roughriders	16	10	5	1	373	309	21
Winnipeg Blue Bombers	16	6	8	2	340	383	14
Calgary Stampeders	16	6	10	0	387	363	12
BC Lions	16	6	10	0	276	331	12

=== Season schedule ===
Week	Game	Date	Opponent	Results	
Week	Game	Date	Opponent	Score	Record
1	1	July 24	at Winnipeg Blue Bombers	L 9–17	0–1
2	2	July 30	at Calgary Stampeders	L 28–30	0–2
3	3	Aug 5	vs. Calgary Stampeders	L 13–28	0–3
4	4	Aug 10	at Saskatchewan Roughriders	W 28–27	1–3
5	5	Aug 14	vs. Edmonton Eskimos	L 24–27	1–4
6	Bye				
7	6	Aug 27	at Edmonton Eskimos	L 10–34	1–5
8	7	Sept 4	vs. Winnipeg Blue Bombers	W 29–17	2–5
9	8	Sept 9	at Winnipeg Blue Bombers	W 15–1	3–5
10	9	Sept 13	vs. Toronto Argonauts	W 32–10	4–5
11	10	Sept 20	vs. Montreal Alouettes	L 17–20	4–6
12	11	Sept 28	at Saskatchewan Roughriders	L 6–33	4–7
13	12	Oct 4	vs. Calgary Stampeders	L 12–38	4–8
14	13	Oct 12	at Hamilton Tiger-Cats	L 8–14	4–9
15	14	Oct 15	at Ottawa Rough Riders	W 25–15	5–9
16	15	Oct 25	vs. Saskatchewan Roughriders	W 12–8	6–9
17	16	Nov 1	vs. Edmonton Eskimos	L 8–12	6–10

=== Offensive leaders ===
Player	Passing yds	Rushing yds	Receiving yds	TD
Peter Liske	2310	31	0	0
Lou Harris		958	220	4
Jim Young		27	935	9
Wayne Moseley		459	257	3
Terry Bailey		252	308	5
Ross Clarkson		0	497	5

== Roster ==
1975 BC Lions final roster
Quarterbacks: 18 Eric Guthrie P/K; 12 Pete Liske; Running backs: 36 Terry Bailey; 31 Lou Harris; 35 Barry Houlihan; 34 Mike Strickland; Wide receivers: 17 Brock Aynsley; 20 Ross Clarkson; 12 Bob Pearce DB; 74 Slade Willis P; 30 Jim Young; Tight ends: 11 Tony Moro	Offensive linemen: 64 Allen Gallaher G; 44 Andy Jonassen C; 62 Layne McDowell T; 65 Jim Schnietz T; 50 Brian Sopatyk G; 61 Curtis Wester G/T; 52 Al Wilson C; Defensive linemen: 76 Bill Baker DE; 66 David Boone DT; 68 Otha Bradley DT; 69 Elton Brown DE; 67 Gary Robinson DT; 60 Don Wunderly DE	Linebackers: 37 Larry Cameron; 78 Paul Giroday; 79 Dan McDonough; 51 Ray Nettles; Defensive backs: 10 Barry Ardern; 28 Doug Carlson; 32 Grady Cavness; 14 Joe Fourqurean; 25 Jim Harris; 26 Floyd Hogan; 16 Rocky Long; 28 Vince Phason; 3 Wally Saunders; Special teams: 58 Brian Berg K; Italics indicate International player

== Awards and records ==
=== 1975 CFL All-Stars ===
- C – Al Wilson, CFL All-Star
- DE – Bill Baker, CFL All-Star
- LB – Larry Cameron, CFL All-Star
