= 1976 BC Lions season =

Canadian football team season

- General manager: Bob Ackles
- Head coach: Cal Murphy
- Home stadium: Empire Stadium

Results
- Record: 5–9–2
- Division place: 4th, West
- Playoffs: did not qualify

Uniform

The 1976 BC Lions finished in fourth place in the Western Conference with a 5–9–2 record and failed to make the playoffs.

The Lions platooned quarterbacks in 1976 in order to find the replacement for Don Moorhead who had 3 knee surgeries in two years and retired in July. These quarterbacks included journeymen Eric Guthrie, Rick Cassata, and UCLA star John Sciarra. However, the result was the Lions had by far the league's worst passing attack with only 2476 yards in passing offence and 46% completion percentage.

After only one win in the final 10 games, head coach Cal Murphy was fired in December after 18 months as head coach and a 10–14–2 record.

Defensive End Bill Baker won the Schenley award for Most Outstanding Defensive Player and rookie John Sciarra (who was converted from quarterback to slotback early in the season and was the Lions top receiver) won the Schenley Rookie award with 563 yards receiving.

Centre Al Wilson and Baker made the CFL All-star team for the second consecutive season.

Uniform changes included new orange-coloured facemask (the Lions were the first CFL team to introduce a coloured facemask, two years after the Kansas City Chiefs and then-San Diego Chargers did the same in the NFL), a double orange helmet stripe and new trimmed numbers to complete the look that most fans remember from the 1970s

Harry Spring is elected to the Canadian Football Hall of Fame in the Builder category.

== Offseason ==
=== CFL draft ===
Round	Pick	Player	Position	School

== Preseason ==
Game	Date	Opponent	Results		Venue	Attendance
Game	Date	Opponent	Score	Record	Venue	Attendance

== Regular season ==
=== Season standings ===
Western Football Conference
Team	GP	W	L	T	PF	PA	Pts
Saskatchewan Roughriders	16	11	5	0	427	238	22
Winnipeg Blue Bombers	16	10	6	0	384	316	20
Edmonton Eskimos	16	9	6	1	311	367	19
BC Lions	16	5	9	2	308	336	12
Calgary Stampeders	16	2	12	2	316	422	6

=== Season schedule ===
Week	Game	Date	Opponent	Results	
Week	Game	Date	Opponent	Score	Record
1	1	July 22	vs. Saskatchewan Roughriders	L 8–35	0–1
2	2	July 29	vs. Hamilton Tiger-Cats	W 39–14	1–1
3	3	Aug 4	at Edmonton Eskimos	L 12–19	1–2
4	4	Aug 11	at Calgary Stampeders	W 13–9	2–2
5	5	Aug 17	vs. Winnipeg Blue Bombers	W 22–14	3–2
6	6	Aug 24	vs. Ottawa Rough Riders	W 23–11	4–2
7	7	Aug 30	at Montreal Alouettes	L 9–30	4–3
8	8	Sept 6	at Saskatchewan Roughriders	L 14–17	4–4
9	9	Sept 12	vs. Calgary Stampeders	W 30–15	5–4
10	10	Sept 19	at Winnipeg Blue Bombers	L 20–22	5–5
11	Bye				
12	11	Oct 2	vs. Edmonton Eskimos	T 27–27	5–5–1
13	12	Oct 11	at Edmonton Eskimos	L 12–16	5–6–1
14	13	Oct 17	vs. Saskatchewan Roughriders	L 15–28	5–7–1
15	14	Oct 24	at Calgary Stampeders	T 31–31	5–7–2
16	15	Oct 30	at Toronto Argonauts	L 16–25	5–8–2
17	16	Nov 6	vs. Winnipeg Blue Bombers	L 17–23	5–9–2

== Roster ==
1976 BC Lions final roster
Quarterbacks: 8 Eric Guthrie; Running backs: 36 Terry Bailey; 31 Lou Harris; 7 Larry Sherrer; 4 Mike Strickland; Wide receivers: 20 Ross Clarkson; 6 John Sciarra QB; 30 Jim Young; Tight ends: 74 Henry Sovio	Offensive linemen: 55 Edgar Bell G; 68 Paul Brock T; 62 Layne McDowell T; 65 Jim Schnietz G/T; 50 Brian Sopatyk G; 52 Al Wilson C; Defensive linemen: 76 Bill Baker DE; 67 Gary Robinson DT; 58 Neal Skarin DE/DT; 70 Wayne Smith DE; 60 Don Wunderly DT	Linebackers: 40 Paul Giroday; 37 Glen Jackson; 51 Ray Nettles; Defensive backs: 10 Barry Ardern; 28 Doug Carlson; 32 Grady Cavness; 27 Ted Dushinski; 14 Joe Fourqurean; 16 Rocky Long; 17 Rollen Smith	Special teams: 18 Lui Passaglia K/P; Injured list: 26 Floyd Hogan DB; Italics indicate International player

== Offensive leaders ==
Player	Passing yds	Rushing yds	Receiving yds	TD
Eric Guthrie	1399	59	0	1
Rick Cassata	984	0	0	0
Mike Strickland		1119	358	11
Lou Harris		784	166	7
John Sciarra	105	92	563	1
Merced Solis		0	329	1
Jim Young		0	327	2

== Awards and records ==
- CFL's Most Outstanding Defensive Player Award – Bill Baker (DE)

=== 1976 CFL All-Stars ===
- C – Al Wilson, CFL All-Star
- DE – Bill Baker, CFL All-Star
