= List of BC Lions seasons =

This is a complete list of seasons competed by the BC Lions, a Canadian Football League team. While the team was founded in 1954, they did not join the CFL until it was founded in 1958. Throughout their history, the Lions have won six Grey Cups.

Grey Cup Championships †	West Division Championships *	Regular season championships ^

League season	Lions season	League	Division	Finish	Wins	Losses	Ties	Playoffs
1954	1954	WIFU	–	5th	1	15	0	Missed playoffs
1955	1955	WIFU	–	4th	5	11	0	Missed playoffs
1956	1956	WIFU	–	4th	6	10	0	Missed playoffs
1957	1957	WIFU	–	4th	4	11	1	Missed playoffs
1958	1958	CFL	W.I.F.U.	5th	3	13	0	Missed playoffs
1959	1959	CFL	W.I.F.U.	3rd	9	7	0	Lost West Semi-Finals (Eskimos) 61–15
1960	1960	CFL	W.I.F.U.	4th	5	9	2	Missed playoffs
1961	1961	CFL	West	5th	1	13	2	Missed playoffs
1962	1962	CFL	West	4th	7	9	0	Missed playoffs
1963	1963	CFL	West*	1st^	12	4	0	Won West Finals (Roughriders) 2–1 series Lost Grey Cup (Tiger-Cats) 21–10
1964	1964	CFL†	West*	1st^	11	2	3	Won West Finals (Stampeders) 2–1 series Won Grey Cup (Tiger-Cats) 34–24 †
1965	1965	CFL	West	4th	6	9	1	Missed playoffs
1966	1966	CFL	West	5th	5	11	0	Missed playoffs
1967	1967	CFL	West	5th	3	12	1	Missed playoffs
1968	1968	CFL	West	4th	4	11	1	Missed playoffs
1969	1969	CFL	West	3rd	5	11	0	Lost West Semi-Final (Stampeders) 35–21
1970	1970	CFL	West	4th	6	10	0	Missed playoffs
1971	1971	CFL	West	4th	6	9	1	Missed playoffs
1972	1972	CFL	West	5th	5	11	0	Missed playoffs
1973	1973	CFL	West	3rd	5	9	2	Lost West Semi-Final (Roughriders) 33–13
1974	1974	CFL	West	3rd	8	8	0	Lost West Semi-Final (Roughriders) 24–14
1975	1975	CFL	West	5th	6	10	0	Missed playoffs
1976	1976	CFL	West	4th	5	9	2	Missed playoffs
1977	1977	CFL	West	2nd	10	6	0	Won West Semi-Final (Blue Bombers) 33–32; Lost West Final (Eskimos) 38–1
1978	1978	CFL	West	4th	7	7	2	Missed playoffs
1979	1979	CFL	West	3rd	9	6	1	Lost West Semi-Final (Stampeders) 37–2
1980	1980	CFL	West	4th	8	7	1	Missed playoffs
1981	1981	CFL	West	3rd	10	6	0	Won West Semi-Final (Blue Bombers) 15–11; Lost West Final (Eskimos) 22–16
1982	1982	CFL	West	4th	9	7	0	Missed playoffs
1983	1983	CFL	West*	1st^	11	5	0	Won West Final (Blue Bombers) 39–21; Lost Grey Cup (Argonauts) 18–17
1984	1984	CFL	West	1st^	12	3	1	Lost West Final (Blue Bombers) 3–14
1985	1985	CFL†	West*	1st^	13	3	0	Won West Final (Blue Bombers) 42–22; Won Grey Cup (Tiger-Cats) 37–24†
1986	1986	CFL	West	2nd	12	6	0	Won West Semi-Final (Blue Bombers) 21–14; Lost West Final (Eskimos) 41–5
1987	1987	CFL	West	1st^	12	6	0	Lost West Final (Eskimos) 31–7
1988	1988	CFL	West*	3rd	10	8	0	Won West Semi-Final (Roughriders) 42–18; Won West Final (Eskimos) 37–19; Lost Grey Cup (Blue Bombers) 22–21
1989	1989	CFL	West	4th	7	11	0	Missed playoffs
1990	1990	CFL	West	4th	6	11	1	Missed playoffs
1991	1991	CFL	West	3rd	11	7	0	Lost West Semi-Final (Stampeders) 43–41
1992	1992	CFL	West	4th	3	15	0	Missed playoffs
1993	1993	CFL	West	4th	10	8	0	Lost West Semi-Final (Stampeders) 17–9
1994	1994	CFL†	West*	3rd	11	6	1	Won West Semi-Final (Eskimos) 24–23; Won West Final (Stampeders) 37–36; Won Grey Cup (Baltimore CFLers) 26–23 †
1995	1995	CFL	North	3rd	10	8	0	Lost North Semi-Final (Eskimos) 26–15
1996	1996	CFL	West	5th	5	13	0	Missed playoffs
1997	1997	CFL	West	4th	8	10	0	Lost East Semi-Final (Alouettes) 45–35
1998	1998	CFL	West	3rd	9	9	0	Lost West Semi-Final (Eskimos) 40–33
1999	1999	CFL	West	1st^	13	5	0	Lost West Final (Stampeders) 26–24
2000	2000	CFL†	West*	3rd	8	10	0	Won West Semi-Final (Eskimos) 34–32; Won West Final (Stampeders) 37–23; Won Grey Cup (Alouettes) 28–26 †
2001	2001	CFL	West	3rd	8	10	0	Lost West Semi-Final (Stampeders) 28–19
2002	2002	CFL	West	3rd	10	8	0	Lost West Semi-Final (Blue Bombers) 30–3
2003	2003	CFL	West	4th	11	7	0	Lost East Semi-Final (Argonauts) 28–7
2004	2004	CFL	West*	1st^	13	5	0	Won West Final (Roughriders) 27–25; Lost Grey Cup (Argonauts) 27–19
2005	2005	CFL	West	1st^	12	6	0	Lost West Final (Eskimos) 28–23
2006	2006	CFL†	West*	1st^	13	5	0	Won West Final (Roughriders) 45–18; Won Grey Cup (Alouettes) 25–14 †
2007	2007	CFL	West	1st^	14	3	1	Lost West Final (Roughriders) 26–17
2008	2008	CFL	West	3rd	11	7	0	Won West Semi-Final (Roughriders) 33–12; Lost West Final (Stampeders) 22–18
2009	2009	CFL	West	4th	8	10	0	Won East Semi-Final (Tiger-Cats) 34–27; Lost East Final (Alouettes) 56–18
2010	2010	CFL	West	3rd	8	10	0	Lost West Semi-Final (Roughriders) 41–38
2011	2011	CFL†	West*	1st^	11	7	0	Won West Final (Eskimos) 40–23; Won Grey Cup (Blue Bombers) 34–23†
2012	2012	CFL	West	1st^	13	5	0	Lost West Final (Stampeders) 34–29
2013	2013	CFL	West	3rd	11	7	0	Lost West Semi-Final (Roughriders) 29–25
2014	2014	CFL	West	4th	9	9	0	Lost East Semi-Final (Alouettes) 50–17
2015	2015	CFL	West	3rd	7	11	0	Lost West Semi-Final (Stampeders) 35–9
2016	2016	CFL	West	2nd	12	6	0	Won West Semi-Final (Blue Bombers) 32–31; Lost West Final (Stampeders) 42–15
2017	2017	CFL	West	5th	7	11	0	Missed playoffs
2018	2018	CFL	West	4th	9	9	0	Lost East Semi-Final (Tiger-Cats) 48–8
2019	2019	CFL	West	5th	5	13	0	Missed playoffs
2020	2020	CFL	West	Season cancelled due to the COVID-19 pandemic				
2021	2021	CFL	West	4th	5	9	0	Missed playoffs
2022	2022	CFL	West	2nd	12	6	0	Won West Semi-Final (Stampeders) 30–16; Lost West Final (Blue Bombers) 28–20
2023	2023	CFL	West	2nd	12	6	0	Won West Semi-Final (Stampeders) 41–30; Lost West Final (Blue Bombers) 24–13
2024	2024	CFL	West	3rd	9	9	0	Lost West Semi-Final (Roughriders) 28–19
2025	2025	CFL	West	2nd	11	7	0	Won West Semi-Final (Stampeders) 33–30; Lost West Final (Roughriders) 24–21
2026	2026	CFL	West	2nd	10	8	0	Won West Semi-Final (Roughriders) 33–26; Lost West Final (Elks) 28–16
Regular season Totals (1954–2026)					603	601	24	
Playoff Totals (1954–2026)					25	37	0	
Grey Cup Totals (1954–2026)					6	4	0	
