= Faces in the Crowd (Sports Illustrated) =

Segment in Sports Illustrated magazine

Faces in the Crowd is a long-running segment from Sports Illustrated. Starting in the January 9, 1956, issue, the segment was originally titled These Faces in the Crowd. The predecessor to These Faces... was a segment called Pat on the Back. It differed in that it did not just focus on unknown or amateur athletes. Contrary to Faces in the Crowd, it featured professional athletes who set milestones and celebrities who undertook an athletic endeavor. Slight deviations from its basic format are rare. One such example was in the college football preview issue on September 5, 1977, when the segment was temporarily retitled Freshmen in the Crowd and featured six incoming gridiron prospects from major NCAA Division I programs. From 1956 to 2006, a total of 15,672 athletes have been featured.

== Video Faces in the Crowd ==
Video Faces in the Crowd is segment from Sports Illustrated and TAKKLE.com, which features up-and-coming high school athletes and their sports videos. The athletes are featured in the Sports Illustrated magazine, on the Sports Illustrated website and on the TAKKLE website.

== Famous Faces in the Crowd ==
=== The 1950s ===
Athlete	Sport	SI Cover Date	Special Notes
Bobby Fischer	Chess	April 30, 1956	At age 15, became youngest International Grandmaster
Althea Gibson	Tennis/Golf	May 21, 1956	Became first African American to win Wimbledon, and later became the first African American on the LPGA tour
Wilma Rudolph	Track and Field	September 3, 1956	First African American woman to win three gold medals in one Olympics
Jack Nicklaus	Golf	September 2, 1957	Winner of 18 professional golf majors, plus 8 senior majors
Elgin Baylor	Basketball	February 10, 1958	Named in 1996 as one of the 50 Greatest Players in NBA History. Later became general manager of the Los Angeles Clippers
Kris Kristofferson	Rugby, Football, Boxing	March 31, 1958	(published as Kristoffer Kristofferson)
Al Oerter	Track and Field	April 14, 1958	First of only two track and field athletes to win the same event in four consecutive Olympics
Bobby Unser	Motor Sports	July 14, 1958	Won the Indianapolis 500 three times

=== The 1960s ===
Athlete	Sport	SI Cover Date	Special Notes
Marv Levy	Football	February 15, 1960	Member of Pro Football Hall of Fame
Arthur Ashe	Tennis	December 12, 1960	Only African American man to win the U.S. Open, Australian Open, or Wimbledon
Billie Jean King	Tennis	July 17, 1961	(published as Billie Jean Moffitt) Won 12 Grand Slam singles titles, 19 Grand Slam women's doubles titles, and 11 Grand Slam mixed doubles titles. Also won a combined 20 titles at Wimbledon.
Evonne Goolagong	Tennis	February 3, 1964	Won seven Grand Slam singles titles
Lew Alcindor (later Kareem Abdul-Jabbar)	Basketball	April 27, 1964	Won three NCAA titles and six NBA championships
Lanny Wadkins	Golf	July 20, 1964	Won 21 times on the PGA Tour, including one PGA Championship
Johnny Miller	Golf	August 24, 1964	Won 25 times on the PGA Tour, including one U.S. Open (with a final-round 63) and one Open Championship
Rollie Fingers	Baseball	September 14, 1964	Had 341 career saves
Bob Beamon	Track and Field	May 10, 1965	Won the gold medal in the long jump at the 1968 Olympics by setting a world record that would stand for over 20 years
Calvin Murphy	Basketball	January 31, 1966	1993 Naismith Memorial Basketball Hall of Fame Inductee; point guard with San Diego/Houston Rockets (1970–1983).
Tim Sheehy	Hockey	March 14, 1966	Right wing with four teams in World Hockey Association and National Hockey League in seven seasons during 1970s.
Terry Bradshaw	Football	April 11, 1966	1989 Pro Football Hall of Fame Inductee; quarterbacked Pittsburgh Steelers to four Super Bowl wins (IX, X, XIII, XIV).
Jeff Petrie	Baseball	May 30, 1966	Shooting guard with Portland Trail Blazers (1970–1976). Given name misspelled and featured for another sport.
Tom Clements	Basketball	January 9, 1967	Starting quarterback with Notre Dame's 1973 NCAA Division I national championship football team. Featured for another sport.
Vera Wang	Figure Skating	January 8, 1968	Became a world-famous fashion designer
Hubert Green	Golf	April 22, 1968	Won 19 times on the PGA Tour, including one U.S. Open and one PGA Championship
Howard Stevens	Football	January 20, 1969	Return specialist with New Orleans Saints (1973–1975) and Baltimore Colts (1975–1977).
Johnny Neumann	Basketball	February 24, 1969	Small forward in American Basketball Association (1971–1976) and National Basketball Association (1976–1977).
Chris Evert	Tennis	April 14, 1969	Won 18 Grand Slam singles titles
Earnie Shavers	Boxing	May 5, 1969	Heavyweight contender in the late 1970s; regarded as one of the hardest punchers ever
Steve Prefontaine	Track and Field	June 2, 1969	Long-distance runner who competed at 1972 Summer Olympics. Feature films Prefontaine and Without Limits based on his life.
Nancy Lopez	Golf	September 15, 1969	Won 48 times on the LPGA tour, including three majors. Married to World Series MVP Ray Knight.
Gary Gabelich	Motor Sports	October 20, 1969	Set then-Fédération Internationale de l'Automobile (FIA) Land Speed Record (LSR) in 1970.

=== The 1970s ===
Athlete	Sport	SI Cover Date	Special Notes
Karl Douglas	Football	January 19, 1970	Quarterback in Canadian Football League with BC Lions (1973–1974) and Calgary Stampeders (1974–1975).
Tony Dungy	Football/Basketball/Track	January 26, 1970	2016 Pro Football Hall of Fame Inductee; head coach of Super Bowl XLI Champion Indianapolis Colts.
Bill Walton	Basketball	January 26, 1970	1993 Naismith Memorial Basketball Hall of Fame Inductee; won NBA Titles with Trail Blazers and Celtics.
Robbie Ftorek	Hockey	April 13, 1970	Center with five teams in WHA and NHL in thirteen seasons during 1970s and 1980s.
Andre McCarter	Basketball	April 13, 1970	Won NCAA title at UCLA (1975) and played professionally with Kings (1976–77) and Bullets (1980–81).
Billy Martin	Tennis	April 27, 1970	Played World Championship Tennis (1975–1982).
Roy Jackson	Baseball	May 11, 1970	Relief pitcher with Mets, Blue Jays, Padres and Twins in late-1970s and 1980s.
Al Trost	Soccer	June 15, 1970	Midfielder with three teams in North American Soccer League and New York Arrows (1979–80).
Ken Kravec	Baseball	July 6, 1970	Starting pitcher with Chicago White Sox (1975–1980) and Chicago Cubs (1981–1982).
Harold Solomon	Tennis	July 20, 1970	1976 French Open Men's Singles finalist.
Dr. Delano Meriwether	Track and Field	August 17, 1970	US Public Health Service’s National Influenza Immunization Program director during 1976 swine flu outbreak.
Jay Haas	Golf	September 7, 1970	Played on PGA Tour (1976–2003). Currently on PGA Tour Champions since 2004.
Samuel Snead	Golf	October 19, 1970	82 PGA Tour wins include PGA Championship and Masters Tournament three times each and The Open Championship once.
Mike Miley	Football	November 16, 1970	LSU quarterback in early-1970s. Shortstop with California Angels (1975–1976).
Glenn Warner	Soccer	November 30, 1970	Winningest coach in Navy Midshipmen men's soccer history, including National Championship in 1964.
Mike Thomas	Football/Basketball	December 21, 1970	Running back with Washington Redskins (1975–1978) and San Diego Chargers (1979–1980).
Craig Virgin	Track and Field	November 29, 1971	Competed at 1976 and 1984 Summer Olympics.
Quinn Buckner	Basketball	April 17, 1972	Won NCAA title and Olympic gold medal in 1976
Tracy Austin	Tennis	October 15, 1973	Won the US Open twice
Wilbert Montgomery	Football	November 12, 1973	Philadelphia Eagles starting running back in Super Bowl XV.
Bill Cartwright	Basketball	February 4, 1974	Six-time NBA Champion with Chicago Bulls in 1990s, three each as a player and assistant coach.
Bart Conner	Gymnastics	April 29, 1974	1984 Summer Olympics double gold medalist in men's team all-around and parallel bars.
Mary Lou Piatek	Tennis	May 20, 1974	Played on WTA Tour during 1980s and early-1990s.
Dave Stegman	Baseball	June 3, 1974	Outfielder with Detroit Tigers, New York Yankees and Chicago White Sox in late-1970s and 1980s.
Butch Edge	Baseball	June 24, 1974	Blue Jays' sixth selection (twelfth overall) in 1976 Major League Baseball expansion draft from Brewers.
Orlando González	Baseball	August 5, 1974	First baseman/corner outfielder with Indians (1976), Phillies (1978) and Athletics (1980).
Roy Hamilton	Basketball	September 9, 1974	Played collegiately at UCLA and professionally with Pistons (1979–80) and Trail Blazers (1980–81).
Bryan E. Haas	Baseball	September 9, 1974	Starting pitcher with Brewers (1976–1985) and Athletics (1986–1987); appeared in 1982 World Series.
Leslie Townes Hope	Golf	September 16, 1974	Comedian known as Bob Hope; listed under his birth name.
David Santee	Figure Skating	September 16, 1974	Competed at 1976 and 1980 Winter Olympics.
Paul Krumpe	Soccer	September 23, 1974	United States men's national soccer team defender at 1990 FIFA World Cup.
Jim Zorn	Football	October 14, 1974	Seattle Seahawks' starting quarterback during franchise's first seven seasons.
Tony Nathan	Football	November 4, 1974	Starting running back with 1978 national champions at Alabama and in Super Bowls XVII and XIX with Dolphins.
Don Hardeman	Football	December 2, 1974	Running back with Houston Oilers (1975–1977) and Baltimore Colts (1978–1979).
Billy Sims	Football	December 23, 1974	1978 Heisman Trophy recipient with Oklahoma; first overall selection in 1980 NFL draft by Detroit Lions.
Kyle Macy	Basketball	January 6, 1975	1978 NCAA Division I Champion with Kentucky; point guard with Suns, Bulls and Pacers in 1980s.
Ray Burse	Rugby/Basketball/Track and Field	January 27, 1975	Two-term President of Kentucky State University (1982–1989, 2014–2016). Actually played football and not basketball.
Bill Willoughby	Basketball	February 3, 1975	Bypassed college to play in NBA with Hawks, Braves, Cavaliers, Rockets, Spurs and Nets from 1975 to 1984.
Phil Mahre	Skiing	March 17, 1975	Silver and gold medalist in men's slalom at 1980 and 1984 Winter Olympics respectively.
Hal Fishman	Aviation	March 17, 1975	Primary evening news anchor at KTLA from 1975 to 2007.
Dave Cottle	Lacrosse	June 9, 1975	Head coached Loyola to a Final (1990) and Semifinal (1998) and Maryland to three Semifinals (2003, 2005 and 2006).
Steve Kemp	Baseball	June 30, 1975	Left fielder with Tigers, White Sox, Yankees, Pirates and Rangers in late-1970s and 1980s.
Pat Underwood	Baseball	July 7, 1975	Relief pitcher with Detroit Tigers from 1979 to 1983. Younger brother of Tom Underwood.
Bill Bordley	Baseball	July 28, 1975	Starting pitcher with San Francisco Giants in 1980.
Tim Wilkison	Tennis	September 22, 1975	Touring pro from 1979 to 1993; US Open quarterfinalist in 1986.
Ed Blankmeyer	Baseball	September 29, 1975	Head coach of St. John's Red Storm baseball team from 1996 to 2019.
David Overstreet	Football	November 17, 1975	Halfback collegiately at Oklahoma and professionally with CFL Alouettes/Concordes and NFL Dolphins in early-1980s.
Amos Lawrence	Football	December 15, 1975	Reserve running back with Super Bowl XVI Champion San Francisco 49ers.
Jimmy Jordan	Football	January 12, 1976	Reserve quarterback in all three seasons of United States Football League's Tampa Bay Bandits from 1983 to 1985.
John Tyma	Soccer	January 19, 1976	Reserve forward with Soccer Bowl '81 Champion Chicago Sting.
Barry Crane	Bridge	January 26, 1976	Television producer and director recognized by the ACBL as the top matchpoint player of all time.
Scott Simpson	Golf	February 9, 1976	Winner of 1987 U.S. Open.
Dave DeBol	Hockey	March 1, 1976	Center with WHA's Cincinnati Stingers (1977–1979) and NHL's Hartford Whalers (1979–1981).
Mike Gminski	Basketball	March 22, 1976	Center collegiately at Duke and professionally with Nets, 76ers, Hornets and Bucks from 1980 to 1994.
Johnny Jones	Track and Field	April 19, 1976	1976 Summer Olympics Gold Medalist; second overall selection in 1980 NFL draft by New York Jets.
Todd Bell	Track and Field/Football	May 17, 1976	Strong safety and linebacker with Chicago Bears and Philadelphia Eagles respectively in 1980s.
Bruce Kimball	Diving	May 24, 1976	1984 Summer Olympics Silver Medalist.
Matt Franco	Soccer	June 14, 1976	Corner infielder with Cubs, Mets and Braves in 1990s and early-2000s. Featured for another sport.
Terry Francona	Baseball	July 12, 1976	Manager of World Series Champions with Boston Red Sox in 2004 and 2007.
Brad Arnsberg	Baseball	August 23, 1976	Pitching coach of World Series Champion Florida Marlins in 2003.
Brad Faxon	Golf	September 20, 1976	Played on PGA Tour (1983–2010). Currently on PGA Tour Champions since 2011.
Steve Cauthen	Horse Racing	November 1, 1976	Youngest U. S. Triple Crown-winning jockey; only one to win both Kentucky and Epsom Derbies.
John McEnroe	Tennis	November 8, 1976	Winner of 17 Grand Slam titles (7 men's singles, 9 men's doubles, 1 mixed doubles) from late-1970s to early-1990s.
Mike Aulby	Bowling	November 8, 1976	First bowler to complete career "Super Slam" (win all five PBA Tour major tournaments at least once).
John Houska	Soccer	December 13, 1976	Goalkeeper in North American Soccer League and Major Indoor Soccer League in late-1970s and early-1980s.
Ken Easley	Football	January 10, 1977	2017 Pro Football Hall of Fame Inductee; strong safety with the Seattle Seahawks (1981–1987).
Lynette Woodward	Basketball	April 4, 1977	2004 Naismith Memorial Basketball Hall of Fame Inductee. First female Harlem Globetrotter. Surname misspelled.
Lance Nethery	Hockey	April 4, 1977	Center with New York Rangers (1980–1982) and Edmonton Oilers (1981–82).
Dave Taylor	Hockey	April 11, 1977	Right wing on Los Angeles Kings' Triple Crown Line in early-1980s.
Mike McGee	Basketball	April 18, 1977	Reserve small forward on two NBA Championship teams with Los Angeles Lakers in 1982 and 1985.
Paul Mellon	Horse Racing	May 16, 1977	One of only five people ever designated "Exemplar of Racing" by National Museum of Racing and Hall of Fame.
Earvin Johnson	Basketball	May 23, 1977	2002 Naismith Memorial Basketball Hall of Fame Inductee; 1992 Summer Olympics Gold Medalist.
Keith Atherton	Baseball	May 23, 1977	Relief pitcher with 1987 World Series Champion Minnesota Twins.
Rodney Holman	Football	May 30, 1977	Three-time All-Pro tight end with Cincinnati Bengals (1988, 1989, 1990) and starter in Super Bowl XXIII.
Jimmy Arias	Tennis	June 13, 1977	1981 French Open Mixed Doubles Champion; US Open semifinalist in 1983.
Jimmy Hines	Golf	June 20, 1977	Winner of nine PGA Tour events from 1933 to 1945.
Hart Lee Dykes Jr.	Baseball/Football	August 8, 1977	Wide receiver with New England Patriots (1989–1990).
Jackie Joyner	Track and Field	August 29, 1977	Three-time Olympic Gold Medalist (two in 1988, one in 1992); holder of top six heptathlon performances to date.
Cindy Nicholas	Swimming	September 19, 1977	First woman to swim the English Channel both ways non-stop.
Bobby Dodd	Tennis	October 17, 1977	1993 College Football Hall of Fame Inductee; Georgia Tech football head coach from 1945 to 1966.
Art Schlichter	Football	November 28, 1977	Quarterback collegiately at Ohio State (1978–1981) and in NFL with Baltimore/Indianapolis Colts (1982–1985).
Carl Lewis	Track and Field	February 6, 1978	Won four gold medals at the 1984 Olympics, and the only other track and field athlete (after Oerter) to win the same event at four consecutive Olympics
Gary Kubiak	Football	November 6, 1978	Played for Denver Broncos and was their head coach when the franchise won Super Bowl 50.
Sam Bowie	Basketball	January 29, 1979	Second overall selection in 1984 NBA draft by Portland Trail Blazers.
Darren Daye	Basketball	March 12, 1979	Small forward collegiately at UCLA and professionally with Bullets, Bulls and Celtics in 1980s.
Anne Donovan	Basketball	April 2, 1979	1995 Naismith Memorial Basketball Hall of Fame Inductee; two-time Summer Olympics Gold Medalist in 1984 and 1988.
Tracee Talavera	Gymnastics	April 2, 1979	1984 Summer Olympics Silver Medalist.
Quintin Dailey	Basketball	April 9, 1979	Shooting guard with Bulls, Clippers and SuperSonics in 1980s and early-1990s.
Marvis Frazier	Boxing	April 16, 1979	Heavyweight with a 19–2 professional record; only losses to Larry Holmes in 1983 and Mike Tyson in 1986.
Clark Kellogg	Basketball	April 30, 1979	Power forward with Indiana Pacers from 1982 to 1987.
Don Mattingly	Baseball	July 16, 1979	6 Time A.L All Star, and 1985 A.L. MVP
Payne Stewart	Golf	July 16, 1979	Won 11 times on the PGA Tour, including two US Opens and one PGA Championship
Herschel Walker	Track and Field/Football	September 10, 1979	Played in USFL and NFL
Greg LeMond	Cycling	November 12, 1979	Won Tour de France three times

=== The 1980s ===
Athlete	Sport	SI Cover Date	Special Notes
Keith Gretzky	Hockey	May 5, 1980	Younger brother of Wayne Gretzky.
Marcus Dupree	Football	October 27, 1980	Played in USFL and NFL
Cheryl Miller	Basketball	March 9, 1981	Winner of Olympic gold medal and two NCAA titles
Michael Andretti	Motor Sports	June 8, 1981	Longtime CART driver and winner of 1991 CART title; now owner of the successful Andretti Green Racing team in the IRL
Shawon Dunston	Baseball	June 7, 1982	Played with the Cubs and the Giants
Spud Webb	Basketball	May 24, 1982	Won NBA Slam Dunk Competition
Darrell Green	Football	July 5, 1982	Super Bowl Champion who won the NFL's Fastest Man competition
Vince Coleman	Baseball/Football	July 12, 1982	Played in 1985 World Series
Mark Breland	Boxing	November 22, 1982	1984 Summer Olympics Gold Medalist; WBA Welterweight Champion (February–August 1987, February 1989 – July 1990).
Rodney Peete	Football	December 20, 1982	Host of The Best Damn Sports Show Period
Steve Alford	Basketball	February 21, 1983	Won one NCAA title, played four years in the NBA, now head coach at UCLA
Pernell Whitaker	Boxing	May 16, 1983	Gold medalist at the 1984 Olympics, and world champion in four weight classes as a professional
Jesse Jackson, Jr.	Football	February 13, 1984	Son of Jesse Jackson, and United States Representative 1995–2012
Al Leiter	Baseball	June 4, 1984	Starting pitcher on World Series Champions with Toronto Blue Jays (1993) and Florida Marlins (1997)
Michael Grier	Hockey	June 18, 1984	Right wing with Edmonton Oilers, Washington Capitals, San Jose Sharks and Buffalo Sabres from late-1990s to early-2010s, later general manager for the Sharks
Emmitt Smith	Football	January 13, 1986	All-time leading rusher in NFL History
Jennifer Capriati	Tennis	March 30, 1987	Won gold medal at 1992 Olympics, and came back from personal problems to win three Grand Slam events in the 2000s
Kristi Yamaguchi	Figure Skating	February 1, 1988	Won gold at 1992 Olympics
Raghib Ismail	Football/Track and Field	July 25, 1988	Won national championship with Notre Dame and the Grey Cup with the Toronto Argonauts
John Olerud	Baseball	August 15, 1988	Winner of two World Series
Dorsey Levens	Football	October 24, 1988	Played with the Green Bay Packers
Michelle Akers	Soccer	March 13, 1989	Winner of Olympic gold medal with Team USA in 1996 Olympics, winner of 1991 and 1999 FIFA Women's World Cups with Team USA, and one of only two women named to the FIFA 100 list of the 125 greatest living soccer players in 2004
Lisa Fernandez	Softball	May 8, 1989	Three-time Summer Olympics Gold Medalist in 1996, 2000 and 2004.
Tracy Murray	Basketball	May 15, 1989	Small forward with six NBA teams in twelve seasons in 1990s and early-2000s; reserve with 1995 Champion Houston Rockets.
Dominique Dawes	Gymnastics	December 25, 1989	Member of the gold medal-winning USA team at the 1996 Olympics

=== The 1990s ===
Athlete	Sport	SI Cover Date	Special Notes
Tiger Woods	Golf	Sept. 24, 1990	Winner of 57 PGA Tour events to date, including 14 majors. Also the only person to hold all four professional major titles simultaneously.
Corliss Williamson	Basketball	April 20, 1992	Drafted by the Sacramento Kings
Marion Jones	Track and Field	June 22, 1992	Won three gold medals at the Sydney Olympics
Brad Friedel	Soccer	February 22, 1993	Played in three FIFA World Cups with the United States, and was included in the Premier League PFA Team of the Year 2002/03.
Michelle Kwan	Figure Skating	February 22, 1993	Winner of nine U.S. Championships and five World Championships. Appeared on cover of Sports Illustrated in 1998.
Shaun Alexander	Football	January 10, 1994	Three-time Pro Bowler, 2005 NFL MVP
Raef LaFrentz	Basketball	March 14, 1994	Has played in the NBA since 1998
Tamika Catchings	Basketball	May 23, 1994	2002 WNBA Rookie of the Year, twice WNBA Defensive Player of the Year
Chamique Holdsclaw	Basketball	January 16, 1995	1999 WNBA Rookie of the Year, six-time All-Star
Vince Carter	Basketball	February 13, 1995	1999 NBA Rookie of the Year, eight-time NBA All-Star
Antawn Jamison	Basketball	February 20, 1995	Has played in the NBA since 1998; 2004 Sixth Man Award. Traded for Vince Carter
Tim Thomas	Basketball	March 13, 1995	Played in the NBA
Paul Pierce	Basketball	April 24, 1995	Set a playoff record with 21 straight free throws made in a game
Travis Henry	Football	October 9, 1995	Played for Buffalo Bills
Mike Bibby	Basketball	June 3, 1996	Has played in the NBA since 1998
Stacy Dragila	Track and Field	July 22, 1996	Gold medalist in the pole vault at 1999 World Championships, 2000 Olympics, and 2001 World Championships
Ron Dayne	Track and Field	September 16, 1996	Won Heisman Trophy December 12, 1999
Charles Howell III	Golf	December 2, 1996	Two-time winner on the PGA Tour
Andy Roddick	Tennis	December 30, 1996	Won the 2003 US Open
Kerri Walsh	Volleyball	January 13, 1997	Gold medalist at 2004 Athens Olympics
Owen Hargreaves	Soccer	May 26, 1997	Player in two World Cups with England. Two time Champions League winner with Bayern Munich and Manchester United
Shane Battier	Basketball	June 2, 1997	Has played in the NBA since 2001
James Chico Hernandez	Sombo	October 21, 1997	Won World FIAS Silver and appeared on Wheaties box
Shawn Marion	Basketball	August 3, 1998	Four-time NBA All-Star and twice on the All-NBA third team
Ben Roethlisberger	Football	December 6, 1999	Two-time Super Bowl winning quarterback (XL and XLIII) for the Pittsburgh Steelers.

=== The 2000s ===
Athlete	Sport	SI Cover Date	Special Notes
Joe Mauer	Baseball, was featured for football	December 25, 2000	American League batting champion in 2006 and 2008. 2009 American League Most Valuable Player.
Ben Gordon	Basketball	March 19, 2001	First-round selection of the Chicago Bulls
Allyson Felix	Track and Field	August 13, 2001	Gold medalist in 200 meters at the 2005 World Championships
Michelle Wie	Golf	August 13, 2001	Became youngest winner of any adult USGA title
Zach Parise	Hockey	February 18, 2002	NHL All-Star and 2010 Olympic silver medalist
Jennie Finch	Softball	March 25, 2002	Gold medalist with Team USA in 2004 Olympics. Appeared in Sports Illustrated Swimsuit Issue, and hosted segments on This Week in Baseball.
Tim Tebow	Football	December 20, 2004	Won 2007 Heisman Trophy, the first sophomore ever to do so, accounted for more rushing touchdowns in 2007-8 than 51 of 118 teams other than Florida in Division I-A.
Mike Rio	Wrestling	March 27, 2006	157-pounder at Lindenwood University, was the only wrestler to defend a national title, pinned all five of his opponents, was named the most outstanding wrestler of the meet.
Christian McCaffrey	Football	January 19, 2009 and November 25, 2013	NCAA single-season all-purpose yards record holder, AP College Football player of the year, Heisman runner-up in 2015.
Summer Ross	Volleyball	October 4, 2010	FIVB 2010 Youth Under-19 and Junior Under-21 world champion, the only athlete, male or female, to win both events in the same year.

== See also ==
- Sports Illustrated Almanac
- Sports Illustrated Kids
- Sports Illustrated on Campus
- Sports Illustrated Swimsuit Issue
- Sports Illustrated for Women
