= Cal Murphy =

Canadian football player and coach

Profile
- Position: Halfback

Personal information
- Born: March 12, 1932; Winnipeg, Manitoba, Canada
- Died: February 18, 2012 (aged 79); Regina, Saskatchewan, Canada
- Listed height: 5 ft 10 in (1.78 m)
- Listed weight: 180 lb (82 kg)

Career information
- High school: Vancouver College
- University: British Columbia

Career history

Playing
- 1956: BC Lions

Coaching
- 1974: BC Lions (Assistant)
- 1975–1976: BC Lions (HC)
- 1977: Montreal Alouettes (Assistant)
- 1978–1982: Edmonton Eskimos (Off. Coach)
- 1983–1986: Winnipeg Blue Bombers (HC)
- 1993–1996: Winnipeg Blue Bombers (HC)
- 1997–1998: Saskatchewan Roughriders (OC)
- 1999: Saskatchewan Roughriders (HC)
- 2000: Frankfurt Galaxy

Operations
- 1983–1996: Winnipeg Blue Bombers (GM)

Awards and highlights
- 2× Annis Stukus Trophy (1983, 1984)
- Canadian Football Hall of Fame (Class of 2004)

Cal Murphy (March 12, 1932 – February 18, 2012) was a Canadian professional football coach, general manager and scout, most notably for the Winnipeg Blue Bombers of the Canadian Football League. In his career as a coach and/or general manager, he led various teams to nine Grey Cup championships, earning a spot in the Canadian Football Hall of Fame. In his retirement years he spent some time as a scout for the Indianapolis Colts of the National Football League.

== Early life ==
Murphy, one of seven children, was born in Winnipeg, Manitoba in 1932. His father, William Murphy, a senior executive with Coca-Cola, moved the family to Vancouver. He attended Vancouver College, a K-12 independent Catholic school for boys served by the Congregation of Christian Brothers in British Columbia, where he was a football standout. He then starred with the University of British Columbia Thunderbirds as a left-handed quarterback and defensive back, and played a brief stint with the British Columbia Lions of the CFL in 1956. Murphy then turned to education, returning to Vancouver College and taking over the reins as head coach in 1960–61. He led the Fighting Irish to their only undefeated season. He pursued his master's degree while an assistant coach at Eastern Washington University under head coach Dave Holmes. Murphy followed Holmes to the University of Hawaii Rainbows, and became part of the most successful coaching tenure in Hawaii history. (From 1968 to 1974, UH won 67 percent of its games and never suffered a losing season.) In 1973, Murphy left Hawaii for the San Jose State Spartans under head coach Darryl Rogers.

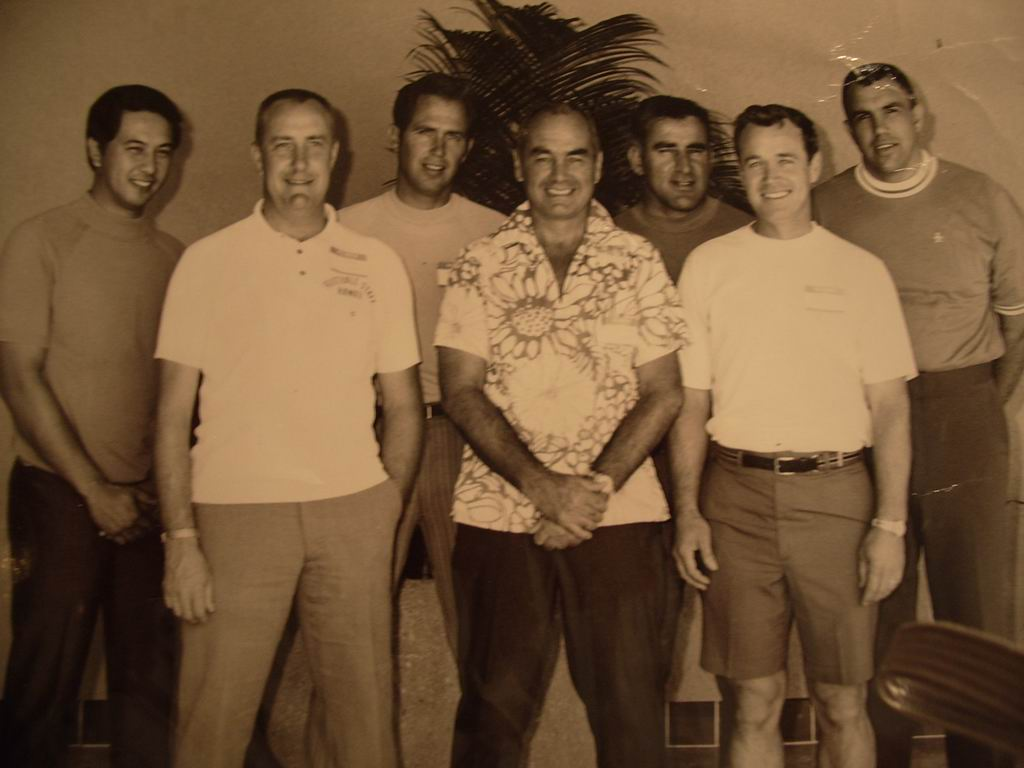
U. of Hawaii coaching staff ca 1968

== Coaching career ==
Cal Murphy joined the CFL coaching ranks in 1974 with the BC Lions under head coach Eagle Keys, and became head coach after game six in the 1975 season. He was fired after the 1976 season, and moved on to spend the 1977 Grey Cup championship season in Montreal with the Alouettes under head coach Marv Levy. In 1978, he took the job as offensive line coach with the Edmonton Eskimos under head coach Hugh Campbell, and from 1978 through 1982, Edmonton won a record five consecutive Grey Cup championships with the talents of football greats such as Tom Wilkinson, Larry Highbaugh, and Warren Moon.

In 1983, Murphy was hired by Paul Robson of the Winnipeg Blue Bombers and spent 14 years as head coach and general manager. He developed a reputation for finding top talent, and developed one of the most feared defenses in CFL history with the likes of Tyrone Jones, James "Wild" West, and Aaron Brown. In a controversial move, he traded away strong-armed and popular starting QB Dieter Brock to the Hamilton Tiger-Cats for the smarts of lesser known QB Tom Clements. Although Clements would suffer a season-ending collarbone injury, and the Bombers would lose in the 1983 Western Final to the BC Lions, they would crush the Brock-led Tiger-Cats in 1984 by a score of 47–17 in a frigid Grey Cup in Edmonton, bringing the city of Winnipeg its first Grey Cup in 22 years.

Murphy was awarded the Annis Stukus Trophy for Coach of the Year in 1983 and 1984. The Blue Bombers appeared in five Grey Cups under his tenure as GM and head coach, winning three in 1984, 1988, 1990. He earned a reputation for his often cantankerous personality. He was an outspoken opponent of CFL expansion to the United States, believing it put a risk to the uniqueness of the Canadian game, and challenged the goodwill relationship long-maintained with the NFL. He finished up his CFL career in Regina with the Saskatchewan Roughriders from 1997 to 1999. In 2000, he coached with the Frankfurt Galaxy in NFL Europe, followed by a brief stint with Chicago Enforcers in the XFL. Murphy was elected into the Canadian Football Hall of Fame in 2004, and was a scout for the Super Bowl Champion Indianapolis Colts at the time of his death.

=== CFL coaching record ===
Team	Year	Regular season					Postseason		
Team	Year	Won	Lost	Ties	Win %	Finish	Won	Lost	Result
BC	1975	5	5	0	.500	5th in West Division	–	–	Missed playoffs
BC	1976	5	9	2	.375	4th in West Division	–	–	Missed playoffs
BC Total		10	14	2	.423	0 West Division; Championships	-	-	0 Grey Cups
WPG	1983	9	7	0	.563	2nd in West Division	1	1	Lost in Division Finals
WPG	1984	11	4	1	.712	2nd in West Division	3	0	Won Grey Cup
WPG	1985	12	4	0	.750	2nd in West Division	1	1	Lost in Division Finals
WPG	1986	11	7	0	.611	3rd in West Division	0	1	Lost in Division Semi-Finals
WPG	1993	14	4	0	.778	1st in East Division	1	1	Lost Grey Cup
WPG	1994	13	5	0	.722	1st in East Division	1	1	Lost in Division Finals
WPG	1995	7	11	0	.389	5th in North Division	0	1	Lost in Division Semi-Finals
WPG	1996	9	9	0	.500	3rd in West Division	0	1	Lost in Division Semi-Finals
WPG Total		86	51	1	.627	2 East Division; Championships	7	7	1 Grey Cup
SSK	1999	3	15	0	.167	5th in West Division	–	–	Missed playoffs
SSK Total		3	15	0	.167	0 West Division; Championships	-	-	0 Grey Cups
CFL Total		99	80	3	.552	2 East Division; Championships	7	7	1 Grey Cup

== Personal life ==
After suffering heart attacks in 1978 and 1985, in 1992 Murphy underwent emergency heart bypass surgery that kept him alive before being saved by a last-second donor and successful heart transplant surgery. In January 1993, the Governor General of Canada presented Cal Murphy with the 125th Anniversary of the Confederation of Canada Medal in recognition of the significant contribution to compatriots, community and to Canada. His eldest son, Mike, is a scout with the NFL's New York Giants, and son-in-law, Sammy Garza, is a scout with the NFL's Dallas Cowboys. He had seven children: Carol, Mike, Barbara, Erin, Shannon, Brian and Kelly.

Cal Murphy died in Regina, Saskatchewan on February 18, 2012, aged 79.
