= 1971 Montana Grizzlies football team =

American college football season

1971 Montana Grizzlies football
- Conference: Big Sky Conference
- Record: 6–5 (3–2 Big Sky)
- Head coach: Jack Swarthout (5th season)
- Home stadium: Dornblaser Field

1971 Big Sky Conference football standings
	Conf.					Overall
Team	W		L		T	W		L		T
Idaho $	4	–	1	–	0	8	–	3	–	0
No. 7 Boise State	4	–	2	–	0	10	–	2	–	0
Montana	3	–	2	–	0	6	–	5	–	0
Weber State	3	–	2	–	1	7	–	2	–	1
Idaho State	2	–	3	–	0	6	–	4	–	0
Northern Arizona	1	–	3	–	0	5	–	5	–	0
Montana State	0	–	5	–	1	2	–	7	–	1
$ – Conference champion; Rankings from AP small college poll

The 1971 Montana Grizzlies football team was an American football team that represented the University of Montana in the Big Sky Conference during the 1971 NCAA College Division football season. In their fifth year under head coach Jack Swarthout, the Grizzlies played home games at Dornblaser Field in Missoula and compiled a 6–5 record (3–2 Big Sky, third).

== Schedule ==
Date	Time	Opponent	Rank	Site	Result	Attendance	Source
September 4	8:00 pm	South Dakota*		Memorial Stadium; Great Falls, MT	W 14–7	8,000	
September 18	12:30 pm	at North Dakota*		Memorial Stadium; Grand Forks, ND	W 27–14	10,100	
September 25	8:30 pm	at Cal Poly*	No. 4	Mustang Stadium; San Luis Obispo, CA	W 38–14	7,500	
October 2	1:30 pm	Idaho	No. 5	Dornblaser Field; Missoula, MT (Little Brown Stein)	L 12–21	12,000	
October 9	8:00 pm	at Boise State	No. 8	Bronco Stadium; Boise, ID	L 24–47	14,315	
October 16	1:30 pm	Idaho State		Dornblaser Field; Missoula, MT	W 45–35	7,000	
October 23	2:15 pm	Pacific (CA)*^{†}		Dornblaser Field; Missoula, MT	L 14–30	10,200	
October 30	1:30 pm	at Weber State		Wildcat Stadium; Ogden, UT	W 14–13	6,575	
November 6	1:30 pm	at Montana State		Gatton Field; Bozeman, MT (rivalry)	W 30–0	9,000–9,200	
November 13	11:00 pm	at Hawaii*		Honolulu Stadium; Honolulu, HI	L 11–25	19,025	
November 20	9:00 pm	at Portland State*		Civic Stadium; Portland, OR	L 29–36	2,733	
*Non-conference game; ^{†}Homecoming; Rankings from AP Poll released prior to the game; All times are in Mountain time

== Coaching staff ==
- Jack Elway (AHC, DB)
- Bill Betcher (OL)
- Charley Armey (DL)
- Ron Nord (LB, E)
