= 1971 South Dakota Coyotes football team =

American college football season

1971 South Dakota Coyotes football
- Conference: North Central Conference
- Record: 3–7 (3–3 NCC)
- Head coach: Joe Salem (6th season)
- Home stadium: Inman Field

1971 North Central Conference football standings
	Conf.					Overall
Team	W		L		T	W		L		T
No. 9 North Dakota $	5	–	1	–	0	6	–	3	–	1
North Dakota State	4	–	2	–	0	7	–	2	–	0
Northern Iowa	4	–	2	–	0	4	–	5	–	0
Morningside	3	–	3	–	0	6	–	4	–	0
South Dakota	3	–	3	–	0	3	–	7	–	0
South Dakota State	2	–	4	–	0	3	–	7	–	0
Augustana (SD)	0	–	6	–	0	1	–	8	–	1
Mankato State *	0	–	0	–	0	7	–	3	–	0
$ – Conference champion; * – Ineligible for conference title; Rankings from AP small college poll

The 1971 South Dakota Coyotes football team was an American football team that represented the University of South Dakota in the North Central Conference (NCC) during the 1971 NCAA College Division football season. In its sixth season under head coach Joe Salem, the team compiled a 3–7 record (3–3 against NCC opponents), tied for fourth place out of seven teams in the NCC, and was outscored by a total of 191 to 172. The team played its home games at Inman Field in Vermillion, South Dakota.

== Schedule ==
Date	Time	Opponent	Site	Result	Attendance	Source
September 4	9:00 p.m.	at Montana*	Memorial Stadium; Great Falls, MT	L 7–14	8,000	
September 11		at Wyoming*	War Memorial Stadium; Laramie, WY	L 28–42	20,899	
September 18		Idaho State*	Inman Field; Vermillion, SD	L 6–10	9,700	
September 25		at No. 1 North Dakota State	Dacotah Field; Fargo, ND	L 15–16	11,000	
October 2		at Northern Iowa	O. R. Latham Stadium; Cedar Falls, IA	L 0–8	5,300	
October 9		Morningside	Inman Field; Vermillion, SD	L 35–6 (forfeit)	10,700	
October 16		at South Dakota State	Coughlin–Alumni Stadium; Brookings, SD (rivalry)	W 37–18	10,000	
October 23		at Drake*	Drake Stadium; Des Moines, IA	L 7–49	6,800	
October 30		Augustana (SD)	Inman Field; Vermillion, SD	W 8–7	800	
November 6		North Dakota	Inman Field; Vermillion, SD (Sitting Bull Trophy)	W 29–21	1,200	
*Non-conference game; Rankings from AP Poll released prior to the game
