= 1971 North Dakota Fighting Sioux football team =

American college football season

1971 North Dakota Fighting Sioux football

NCC champion
- Conference: North Central Conference
- Record: 6–3–1 (5–2 NCC)
- Head coach: Jerry Olson (4th season)
- Home stadium: Memorial Stadium

1971 North Central Conference football standings
	Conf.					Overall
Team	W		L		T	W		L		T
No. 9 North Dakota $	5	–	1	–	0	6	–	3	–	1
North Dakota State	4	–	2	–	0	7	–	2	–	0
Northern Iowa	4	–	2	–	0	4	–	5	–	0
Morningside	3	–	3	–	0	6	–	4	–	0
South Dakota	3	–	3	–	0	3	–	7	–	0
South Dakota State	2	–	4	–	0	3	–	7	–	0
Augustana (SD)	0	–	6	–	0	1	–	8	–	1
Mankato State *	0	–	0	–	0	7	–	3	–	0
$ – Conference champion; * – Ineligible for conference title; Rankings from AP small college poll

The 1971 North Dakota Fighting Sioux football team, also known as the Nodaks, was an American football team that represented the University of North Dakota in the North Central Conference (NCC) during the 1971 NCAA College Division football season. In its fourth year under head coach Jerry Olson, the team compiled a 6–3–1 record (5–2 against NCC opponents), won the NCC championship, and outscored opponents by a total of 245 to 142. The team played its home games at Memorial Stadium in Grand Forks, North Dakota.

== Schedule ==
Date	Opponent	Site	Result	Attendance	Source
September 11	vs. Montana State*	Daylis Stadium; Billings, MT	W 17–15	6,500–7,000	
September 18	Montana*	Memorial Stadium; Grand Forks, ND	L 14–27	10,100	
September 25	at Mankato State	Blakeslee Stadium; Mankato, MN	L 10–13	3,000	
October 2	Augustana (SD)	Memorial Stadium; Grand Forks, ND	W 26–10	3,400	
October 9	South Dakota State	Memorial Stadium; Grand Forks, ND	W 35–7	6,570	
October 16	at No. 1 North Dakota State	Dacotah Field; Fargo, ND (Nickel Trophy)	W 23–7	12,800	
October 23	Morningside	Memorial Stadium; Grand Forks, ND	W 59–7	5,300	
October 30	at Northern Iowa	O. R. Latham Stadium; Cedar Falls, IA	W 23–10	6,800	
November 6	at South Dakota	Inman Field; Vermillion, SD (Sitting Bull Trophy)	L 21–29	1,200	
November 13	at UNLV*	Las Vegas Stadium; Whitney, NV	T 17–17	7,600	
*Non-conference game; Rankings from AP Poll released prior to the game
