= 1971 Boise State Broncos football team =

American college football season

1971 Boise State Broncos football

Camellia Bowl, W 32–28 vs. Chico State
- Conference: Big Sky Conference

Ranking
- Coaches: No. 13 (small college)
- AP: No. 7 (small college)
- Record: 10–2 (4–2 Big Sky)
- Head coach: Tony Knap (4th season)
- Home stadium: Bronco Stadium

1971 Big Sky Conference football standings
	Conf.					Overall
Team	W		L		T	W		L		T
Idaho $	4	–	1	–	0	8	–	3	–	0
No. 7 Boise State	4	–	2	–	0	10	–	2	–	0
Montana	3	–	2	–	0	6	–	5	–	0
Weber State	3	–	2	–	1	7	–	2	–	1
Idaho State	2	–	3	–	0	6	–	4	–	0
Northern Arizona	1	–	3	–	0	5	–	5	–	0
Montana State	0	–	5	–	1	2	–	7	–	1
$ – Conference champion; Rankings from AP small college poll

The 1971 Boise State Broncos football team represented Boise State College during the 1971 NCAA College Division football season, the fourth season of Bronco football (at the four-year level) and the second as members of the Big Sky Conference and NCAA. In the College Division (now Division II), they played their home games on campus at Bronco Stadium in Boise, Idaho.

Led by fourth-year head coach Tony Knap, the Broncos were 9–2 in the regular season (4–2 in conference), and were invited to the Camellia Bowl in Sacramento, California.

Boise State opened the season with a stunning 42–14 upset of Idaho in the first meeting between the two teams, creating an instant rivalry game. This was actually an Idaho "home game" moved to Boise, because their new stadium in Moscow was not completed. A member of the University Division, Idaho had frequently played one home game per season in Boise in the old wooden Bronco Stadium (and its predecessors) from 1920 through 1968; this ended when Boise State joined the Big Sky. Despite the opening loss, Idaho won the conference title in 1971, as the Broncos lost twice on the road.

Knap was named coach of the year in the West for the College Division.

== Schedule ==
Date	Time	Opponent	Rank	Site	Result	Attendance	Source
September 11	8:00 pm	vs. Idaho		Bronco Stadium; Boise, ID (rivalry)	W 42–14	16,123	
September 18	8:00 pm	Cal Poly*		Bronco Stadium; Boise, ID	W 18–14	12,357	
September 25	1:30 pm	at Nevada*		Mackay Stadium; Reno, NV (rivalry)	W 17–10	5,800	
October 2	7:30 pm	at Weber State		Wildcat Stadium; Ogden, UT	L 7–20	11,458	
October 9	8:00 pm	No. 8 Montana		Bronco Stadium; Boise, ID	W 47–24	14,315	
October 16	2:30 pm	at Eastern Washington*		Woodward Field; Cheney, WA	W 34–28	3,400	
October 23		Central Washington*		Bronco Stadium; Boise, ID	W 35–26	7,211	
October 30	1:30 pm	Montana State^{†}		Bronco Stadium; Boise, ID	W 52–24	11,217	
November 6	1:30 pm	Northern Arizona	No. 10	Bronco Stadium; Boise, ID	W 22–17	7,982	
November 13	7:30 pm	at Idaho State	No. 5	ASISU Minidome; Pocatello, ID	L 17–21	13,000	
November 20	1:30 pm	College of Idaho*	No. 8	Bronco Stadium; Boise, ID	W 28–21	4,278	
December 11	2:30 pm	vs. Chico State*	No. 7	Charles C. Hughes Stadium; Sacramento, CA (Camellia Bowl)	W 32–28	16,313	
*Non-conference game; ^{†}Homecoming; Rankings from AP Poll released prior to the game; All times are in Mountain time

- The opener was a home game for Idaho, but played at Bronco Stadium; their new Idaho Stadium in Moscow opened in October

== Camellia Bowl ==
Invited for the first time to the eight-team postseason in the College Division, Boise State accepted a bid to play Chico State in the Camellia Bowl in Sacramento, California. The teams last met in the season opener in 1970, the first-ever game in Bronco Stadium. Boise State was ranked seventh in the final small college poll, released by the Associated Press in late November.

The game included a wager between the respective governors of the two states, Cecil Andrus of Idaho and Ronald Reagan of California. The bet was for three-day vacations, at either Sun Valley in central Idaho or Disneyland in southern California.

	1	2	3	4	Total
Broncos	0	0	7	25	32
Chico State	0	14	14	0	28

Reagan invited the Chico State team to his office the day before the game and encouraged the Wildcats to go out and win for the state of California. Although a neutral site game, Chico State only had to travel ninety miles (145 km) from its campus.

After a scoreless first quarter, Chico State had a 14–0 lead at halftime, and was ahead by three touchdowns after three quarters. Led by quarterback (and placekicker) Eric Guthrie, Boise State outscored the Wildcats 25–0 in the final period to win 32–28. This was the extent of the postseason in the College Division; after the final poll in late November, four regional bowls (quarterfinals) were played in mid-December. A full tournament was initiated in 1973 with the introduction of Division II.

It was later revealed that Guthrie had signed a professional baseball contract with the Pittsburgh Pirates organization five years earlier in 1966. The NCAA had Boise State return the winner's trophy and $18,000, its share of the gate and other receipts.

== NFL draft ==
Two Broncos were selected in the 1972 NFL draft, which lasted 17 rounds (442 selections).

Player	Position	Round	Overall	Franchise
Steve Vogel	Linebacker	9th	209	Buffalo Bills
Eric Guthrie	Quarterback	14th	356	San Francisco 49ers
