= 1971 Weber State Wildcats football team =

American college football season

1971 Weber State Wildcats football
- Conference: Big Sky Conference
- Record: 7–2–1 (3–2–1 Big Sky)
- Head coach: Sark Arslanian (7th season)
- Home stadium: Wildcat Stadium

1971 Big Sky Conference football standings
	Conf.					Overall
Team	W		L		T	W		L		T
Idaho $	4	–	1	–	0	8	–	3	–	0
No. 7 Boise State	4	–	2	–	0	10	–	2	–	0
Montana	3	–	2	–	0	6	–	5	–	0
Weber State	3	–	2	–	1	7	–	2	–	1
Idaho State	2	–	3	–	0	6	–	4	–	0
Northern Arizona	1	–	3	–	0	5	–	5	–	0
Montana State	0	–	5	–	1	2	–	7	–	1
$ – Conference champion; Rankings from AP small college poll

The 1971 Weber State Wildcats football team represented Weber State College (now known as Weber State University) as a member of the Big Sky Conference during the 1971 NCAA College Division football season. Led by seventh-year head coach Sark Arslanian, the Wildcats compiled an overall record of 7–2–1, with a mark of 3–2–1 in conference play, and finished fourth in the Big Sky.

== Schedule ==
Date	Time	Opponent	Site	Result	Attendance	Source
September 18	7:30 p.m.	North Texas State*	Wildcat Stadium; Ogden, UT	W 20–0	13,071	
September 25		Northern Arizona	Wildcat Stadium; Ogden, UT	W 23–7	14,171	
October 2		Boise State	Wildcat Stadium; Ogden, UT	W 20–7	11,458	
October 9		Portland State*	Wildcat Stadium; Ogden, UT	W 54–26	12,249	
October 16		at Montana State	Gatton Field; Bozeman, MT	T 21–21	5,500	
October 23		at UNLV*	Las Vegas Stadium; Whitney, NV	W 30–17	10,200	
October 30		Montana	Wildcat Stadium; Ogden, UT	L 13–14	6,575	
November 6		Idaho	Wildcat Stadium; Ogden, UT	L 20–24	8,404	
November 20		at Idaho State	ASISU Minidome; Pocatello, ID	W 28–21	11,000	
November 27		at Valley State*	North Campus Stadium; Northridge, CA	W 44–7	1,000	
*Non-conference game; All times are in Mountain time
