= 1971 Northern Iowa Panthers football team =

American college football season

1971 Northern Iowa Panthers football
- Conference: North Central Conference
- Record: 4–5 (4–2 NCC)
- Head coach: Stan Sheriff (12th season)
- Defensive coordinator: Dennis Remmert (1st season)
- Home stadium: O. R. Latham Stadium

1971 North Central Conference football standings
	Conf.					Overall
Team	W		L		T	W		L		T
No. 9 North Dakota $	5	–	1	–	0	6	–	3	–	1
North Dakota State	4	–	2	–	0	7	–	2	–	0
Northern Iowa	4	–	2	–	0	4	–	5	–	0
Morningside	3	–	3	–	0	6	–	4	–	0
South Dakota	3	–	3	–	0	3	–	7	–	0
South Dakota State	2	–	4	–	0	3	–	7	–	0
Augustana (SD)	0	–	6	–	0	1	–	8	–	1
Mankato State *	0	–	0	–	0	7	–	3	–	0
$ – Conference champion; * – Ineligible for conference title; Rankings from AP small college poll

The 1971 Northern Iowa Panthers football team was an American football team that represented the University of Northern Iowa as a member of the North Central Conference (NCC) during the 1971 NCAA College Division football season. In its 12th season under head coach Stan Sheriff, the team compiled a 4–5 record (4–2 in conference games) and tied for second place in the NCC.

The team's statistical leaders included sophomore quarterback Al Wichtendahl (804 passing yards), junior halfback Jerry Roling (388 rushing yards), and senior split end Larry Skartvedt (469 receiving yards). Four Northern Iowa players were named to the all-NCC team: Skartvedt; defensive end Mike Allen; linebacker Bob Lee; and free safety Mike Woodley.

The team played its home games at O. R. Latham Stadium in Cedar Falls, Iowa.

== Schedule ==
Date	Opponent	Site	Result	Attendance	Source
September 11	Northeast Missouri State*	O. R. Latham Stadium; Cedar Falls, IA	L 9–22	6,200	
September 18	at Eastern Kentucky*	Roy Kidd Stadium; Richmond, KY	L 7–21	5,500	
September 25	at South Dakota State	Coughlin–Alumni Stadium; Brookings, SD	W 23–0	2,500	
October 2	South Dakota	O. R. Latham Stadium; Cedar Falls, IA	W 8–0	5,300	
October 9	at Drake*	Drake Stadium; Des Moines, IA (rivalry)	L 0–28	13,000	
October 16	at Morningside	Sioux City, IA	W 21–0	6,000	
October 23	at No. 5 North Dakota State	Dacotah Field; Fargo, ND	L 11–23	9,000	
October 30	North Dakota	O. R. Latham Stadium; Cedar Falls, IA	L 10–23	6,800	
November 7	Augustana (SD)	O. R. Latham Stadium; Cedar Falls, IA	W 17–0	4,000	
*Non-conference game; Rankings from AP Poll released prior to the game
