= 1971 Montana State Bobcats football team =

American college football season

1971 Montana State Bobcats football
- Conference: Big Sky Conference
- Record: 2–7–1 (0–5–1 Big Sky)
- Head coach: Sonny Holland (1st season)
- Offensive coordinator: Don Christensen (1st season)
- Defensive coordinator: Sonny Lubick (1st season)
- Home stadium: Gatton Field (final season)

1971 Big Sky Conference football standings
| | Conf. | | | | | Overall |
| Team | W | | L | | T | W | | L | | T |
|---|---|---|---|---|---|---|---|---|---|---|
| Idaho $ | 4 | – | 1 | – | 0 | 8 | – | 3 | – | 0 |
| No. 7 Boise State | 4 | – | 2 | – | 0 | 10 | – | 2 | – | 0 |
| Montana | 3 | – | 2 | – | 0 | 6 | – | 5 | – | 0 |
| Weber State | 3 | – | 2 | – | 1 | 7 | – | 2 | – | 1 |
| Idaho State | 2 | – | 3 | – | 0 | 6 | – | 4 | – | 0 |
| Northern Arizona | 1 | – | 3 | – | 0 | 5 | – | 5 | – | 0 |
| Montana State | 0 | – | 5 | – | 1 | 2 | – | 7 | – | 1 |
$ – Conference champion; Rankings from AP small college poll

The 1971 Montana State Bobcats football team was an American football team that represented Montana State University in the Big Sky Conference during the 1971 NCAA College Division football season. In their first season under head coach Sonny Holland, the Bobcats compiled a 2–7–1 record (0–5–1 in Big Sky, last).

Home games were played on campus at Gatton Field in Bozeman, Montana; the stadium was razed following this season, and the site is now occupied by the Marga Hosaeus Fitness Center, opened in 1973.

== Schedule ==
| Date | Opponent | Site | Result | Attendance | Source |
|---|---|---|---|---|---|
| September 11 | vs. North Dakota* | Daylis Stadium; Billings, MT | L 15–17 | 6,500–7,000 | |
| September 18 | at North Dakota State* | Dacotah Field; Fargo, ND | L 12–28 | 9,700 | |
| September 25 | Fresno State* | Gatton Field; Bozeman, MT | W 37–28 | 7,500 | |
| October 2 | Portland State* | Gatton Field; Bozeman, MT | W 23–8 | 7,000 | |
| October 9 | at Northern Arizona | Lumberjack Stadium; Flagstaff, AZ | L 16–25 | 7,436 | |
| October 16 | Weber State^{†} | Gatton Field; Bozeman, MT | T 21–21 | 5,500 | |
| October 23 | at Idaho State | ASISU Minidome; Pocatello, ID | L 36–38 | 10,700 | |
| October 30 | at Boise State | Bronco Stadium; Boise, ID | L 24–52 | 11,217 | |
| November 6 | Montana | Gatton Field; Bozeman, MT (rivalry) | L 0–30 | 9,000–9,200 | |
| November 13 | at Idaho | Idaho Stadium; Moscow, ID | L 2–40 | 12,900 | |
*Non-conference game; ^{†}Homecoming
