= 1971 Northern Arizona Lumberjacks football team =

American college football season

1971 Northern Arizona Lumberjacks football
- Conference: Big Sky Conference
- Record: 5–5 (1–3 Big Sky)
- Head coach: Ed Peasley (1st season)
- Home stadium: Lumberjack Stadium

1971 Big Sky Conference football standings
	Conf.					Overall
Team	W		L		T	W		L		T
Idaho $	4	–	1	–	0	8	–	3	–	0
No. 7 Boise State	4	–	2	–	0	10	–	2	–	0
Montana	3	–	2	–	0	6	–	5	–	0
Weber State	3	–	2	–	1	7	–	2	–	1
Idaho State	2	–	3	–	0	6	–	4	–	0
Northern Arizona	1	–	3	–	0	5	–	5	–	0
Montana State	0	–	5	–	1	2	–	7	–	1
$ – Conference champion; Rankings from AP small college poll

The 1971 Northern Arizona Lumberjacks football team represented Northern Arizona University as a member of the Big Sky Conference during the 1971 NCAA College Division football season. Led by first-year head coach Ed Peasley, the Lumberjacks compiled an overall record of 5–5, with a mark of 1–3 in conference play, and finished sixth in the Big Sky.

== Schedule ==
Date	Opponent	Site	Result	Attendance	Source
September 11	at North Dakota State*	Dacotah Field; Fargo, ND	L 9–42	11,600	
September 18	New Mexico Highlands*	Lumberjack Stadium; Flagstaff, AZ	W 27–34 (forfeit win)	6,825	
September 25	at Weber State	Wildcat Stadium; Ogden, UT	L 7–23	14,171	
October 2	Drake*	Lumberjack Stadium; Flagstaff, AZ	L 13–38	4,475	
October 9	Montana State	Lumberjack Stadium; Flagstaff, AZ	W 25–16	7,436	
October 16	UNLV*	Lumberjack Stadium; Flagstaff, AZ	W 20–7	4,125	
October 23	at Trinity (TX)*	Alamo Stadium; San Antonio, TX	L 21–42	3,071	
October 30	Valley State*	Lumberjack Stadium; Flagstaff, AZ	W 48–0	5,870	
November 6	at No. 10 Boise State	Bronco Stadium; Boise, ID	L 17–22	7,982	
November 13	Southern Oregon*	Lumberjack Stadium; Flagstaff, AZ	W 1–0 (forfeit win)	N/A	
*Non-conference game; Rankings from AP Poll released prior to the game
