= 1971 North Dakota State Bison football team =

American college football season

1971 North Dakota State Bison football
- Conference: North Central Conference
- Record: 7–2 (4–2 NCC)
- Head coach: Ron Erhardt (6th season)
- Home stadium: Dacotah Field

1971 North Central Conference football standings
| | Conf. | | | | | Overall |
| Team | W | | L | | T | W | | L | | T |
|---|---|---|---|---|---|---|---|---|---|---|
| No. 9 North Dakota $ | 5 | – | 1 | – | 0 | 6 | – | 3 | – | 1 |
| North Dakota State | 4 | – | 2 | – | 0 | 7 | – | 2 | – | 0 |
| Northern Iowa | 4 | – | 2 | – | 0 | 4 | – | 5 | – | 0 |
| Morningside | 3 | – | 3 | – | 0 | 6 | – | 4 | – | 0 |
| South Dakota | 3 | – | 3 | – | 0 | 3 | – | 7 | – | 0 |
| South Dakota State | 2 | – | 4 | – | 0 | 3 | – | 7 | – | 0 |
| Augustana (SD) | 0 | – | 6 | – | 0 | 1 | – | 8 | – | 1 |
| Mankato State * | 0 | – | 0 | – | 0 | 7 | – | 3 | – | 0 |
$ – Conference champion; * – Ineligible for conference title; Rankings from AP small college poll

The 1971 North Dakota State Bison football team was an American football team that represented North Dakota State University during the 1971 NCAA College Division football season as a member of the North Central Conference. In their sixth year under head coach Ron Erhardt, the team compiled a 7–2 record.

== Schedule ==
| Date | Opponent | Rank | Site | Result | Attendance | Source |
|---|---|---|---|---|---|---|
| September 11 | Northern Arizona* | | Dacotah Field; Fargo, ND | W 42–9 | 11,600 | |
| September 18 | Montana State* | | Dacotah Field; Fargo, ND | W 28–12 | 9,700 | |
| September 25 | South Dakota | No. 1 | Dacotah Field; Fargo, ND | W 16–15 | 11,000 | |
| October 2 | at Morningside | No. 2 | Roberts Field; Sioux City, IA | W 62–0 | 13,000 | |
| October 9 | at Augustana (SD) | No. 1 | Howard Wood Field; Sioux Falls, SD | W 23–7 | 3,500–4,000 | |
| October 16 | North Dakota^{†} | No. 1 | Dacotah Field; Fargo, ND (Nickel Trophy) | L 7–23 | 12,800 | |
| October 23 | Northern Iowa | No. 5 | Dacotah Field; Fargo, ND | W 23–11 | 9,000 | |
| October 30 | at South Dakota State | No. 6 | Coughlin–Alumni Stadium; Brookings, SD (rivalry) | L 13–20 | 2,000 | |
| November 6 | at Mankato State* | No. 9 | Blakeslee Stadium; Mankato, MN | W 33–7 | 2,500 | |
*Non-conference game; ^{†}Homecoming; Rankings from AP Poll released prior to the game
