= 1971 Idaho Vandals football team =

American college football season

1971 Idaho Vandals football

Big Sky champion
- Conference: Big Sky Conference
- Record: 8–3 (4–1 Big Sky)
- Head coach: Don Robbins (2nd season)
- Offensive coordinator: Bobby Thompson (3rd season)
- Defensive coordinator: Ray Fulton (2nd season)
- MVP: Ron Linehan
- Captains: Jack Goddard; Ron Linehan
- Home stadium: Idaho Stadium; Bronco Stadium; Joe Albi Stadium

1971 Big Sky Conference football standings
	Conf.					Overall
Team	W		L		T	W		L		T
Idaho $	4	–	1	–	0	8	–	3	–	0
No. 7 Boise State	4	–	2	–	0	10	–	2	–	0
Montana	3	–	2	–	0	6	–	5	–	0
Weber State	3	–	2	–	1	7	–	2	–	1
Idaho State	2	–	3	–	0	6	–	4	–	0
Northern Arizona	1	–	3	–	0	5	–	5	–	0
Montana State	0	–	5	–	1	2	–	7	–	1
$ – Conference champion; Rankings from AP small college poll

The 1971 Idaho Vandals football team represented the University of Idaho as a member of the Big Sky Conference during the 1971 NCAA University Division football season. Lled by second-year head coach Don Robbins, the Vandals played the final three of their five home games at the new Idaho Stadium, an outdoor facility on campus in Moscow, Idaho.

The Vandals won their first outright conference title in 1971, which included an eight-game winning streak after opening with two losses. Idaho finished 8–3 in the regular season and 4–1 in the Big Sky. At the time, it was the best record in school history.

== Notable games ==
A third consecutive season opened without a home field, as the new Idaho Stadium was not quite finished and there was no suitable venue available on the Palouse. After the wooden Neale Stadium (1937) was condemned in August 1969, the Vandals played their limited schedule of Palouse home games at the wooden Rogers Field at WSU in nearby Pullman in 1969 and 1970. The primary (south) grandstand of Rogers burned in April 1970, and was razed in 1971; in its footprint Martin Stadium was constructed and opened in September 1972.

The Vandals' season opener was a stunning 14–42 upset loss at Boise State in the first meeting between the two teams, creating an instant rivalry game. This was actually an Idaho "home game" moved south to Boise, because the new stadium in Moscow was behind schedule and not completed. Boise State had been a junior college program through 1967, moved up to NAIA in 1968 as an independent, and joined the NCAA "college division" (Division II) and Big Sky in 1970. Idaho had played a home game every season in Boise in the old wooden Bronco Stadium through 1968; this ended when Boise State joined the Big Sky.

The Colorado State game on September 25 was played at Joe Albi Stadium in Spokane, The Vandals shut out the CSU Rams 10–0 to begin their eight-game winning streak; the Rams' star running back was Lawrence McCutcheon, who was selected for multiple Pro Bowls while with the Los Angeles Rams.

The new Idaho Stadium opened with a 40–3 Vandal victory over Idaho State on October 9. The unlit outdoor concrete stadium in Moscow replaced Neale Stadium in the same footprint and continued with a natural grass surface. It was the first game played on campus in nearly three years, the last was a win on November 2, 1968. Artificial turf, 3M Tartan Turf, was installed in 1972, and the facility was enclosed in 1975 to become the multi-purpose Kibbie Dome.

After four consecutive road victories, the Vandals finished the 1971 season at home with a 40–2 victory over Montana State to wrap up the Big Sky title, and a disappointing 13–42 non-conference loss to Utah State in the finale. Boise State finished at 10–2 with a postseason win, but its two losses were in league play and finished second in the Big Sky at 4–2.

== Division I ==
Although a charter member of a conference whose other members were "college division" (Division II) for football, Idaho maintained its status as a "university division" (Division I) program with the NCAA by playing only "university division" opponents in its non-conference schedule. That is why runner-up Boise State went to the Camellia Bowl in 1971, and when the Division II playoffs arrived in 1973, the Vandals were again ineligible, as they were in Division I. (Idaho was a member of the conference primarily for basketball, in Division I.)

The Big Sky moved up to the new Division I-AA in 1978, and Idaho was forced to move down. In 18 seasons in I-AA, the Vandals reached the post-season playoffs 11 times, missing only once in the final 11 seasons of 1985–95.

Idaho returned to Division I-A in 1996 with a move to the Big West, and then to the WAC in 2005. (The Big West dropped football after 2000; Idaho was a "football only" member of the Sun Belt for four seasons, 2000–04.) The WAC dropped football after the 2012 season and Idaho athletics rejoined the Big Sky in 2013 for all sports except football, which was independent in 2013, rejoined the Sun Belt in 2014, and the Big Sky (FCS) in 2018.

== Schedule ==
Date	Time	Opponent	Site	Result	Attendance	Source
September 11	7:00 pm	Boise State^{Δ}	Bronco Stadium; Boise, ID (rivalry)	L 14–42	16,123	
September 18	11:30 am	at Iowa State*	Clyde Williams Field; Ames, IA	L 7–24	25,000	
September 25	7:30 pm	Colorado State^{Δ}*	Joe Albi Stadium; Spokane, WA	W 10–0	12,600	
October 2	12:30 pm	at Montana	Dornblaser Field; Missoula, MT (Little Brown Stein)	W 21–12	12,000	
October 9	1:30 pm	Idaho State^{†}	Idaho Stadium; Moscow, ID (rivalry)	W 40–3	14,200	
October 16	2:00 pm	at Pacific (CA)*	Pacific Memorial Stadium; Stockton, CA	W 13–12	10,132–10,281	
October 23	6:00 pm	at West Texas State*	Buffalo Bowl; Canyon, TX	W 26–0	14,000	
October 30	6:30 pm	at New Mexico State*	Memorial Stadium; Las Cruces, NM	W 19–14		
November 6	12:30 pm	at Weber State	Wildcat Stadium; Ogden, UT	W 24–20	8,404	
November 13	12:30 pm	Montana State	Idaho Stadium; Moscow, ID	W 40–2	12,900	
November 20	12:30 pm	Utah State*	Idaho Stadium; Moscow, ID	L 13–42	15,100	
*Non-conference game; ^{†}Homecoming; ^{Δ} Home game played off-campus (Boise, Spokane); All times are in Pacific time

== Roster ==
1971 Idaho Vandals football team roster
Players
Coaches
Offense

Pos.	#	Name	Class
QB	10	Tom Ponciano	Sr
QB	12	Bruce Cole	So
QB	18	Rick Seefried	So
RB	20	Fred Riley	Sr
RB	22	Robert Williams	Sr
FL	24	Jerry Hall	Jr
WR	30	Alan Head	So
RB	35	Bernie Rembert	Jr
RB	36	Mike Clements	So
RB	38	Kim Giordano	Jr
RB	40	Randy Peterson	Jr
RB	43	Malcolm Smith	Sr
RB	44	Frank Doctor	Jr
TE	45	Jim Wilund	Sr
C	50	Ken Muhlbeier	Jr
C	51	Dennis Feeney	So
C	59	Daryl Hanauer	Jr
OT	70	Richard Beaver	Sr
OL	72	Larry Bosma	Jr
G, T	73	Faustin Riley	Sr
OL	74	Dave Crnich	Jr
G	75	Rich Kushlan	Sr
OL	76	Bob Van Duyne	So
OL	77	Larry Warren	Jr
G, T	78	Andy Kupp	Sr
OL	79	Jerry Secrest	So
WR	80	Jay Curcio	So
TE	82	Darrell Burchfield	Jr
TE	84	Jim Welch	So
WR	83	Kevin Ault	Jr
WR	89	Jack Goddard (C)	Sr

Defense

Pos.	#	Name	Class
S	11	Bucky Bruns	So
S	16	Steve Hunter	Jr
S	23	Ross Nelson	Fr
S	25	Randy Hall	So
DB	26	Loren Dantzler	Sr
S	27	Pat Sprute	Sr
CB	33	Rod Maynard	Jr
S	34	Bob Miller	Sr
CB	37	Kirby Cook	Jr
CB	42	Kelly Courage	Jr
LB	52	John Bligh	So
LB	53	Rand Marquess	Jr
LB	54	Fred Morschek	So
LB	55	Lindsey Burgess	So
DL	56	Mark Busch	Jr
LB	58	Ralph Sletager	Jr
LB	61	Ron Linehan (C)	Sr
DL	62	Steve Mabry	Jr
DT	65	Bill Cady	Sr
DL	66	Rick Clute	So
NG	67	Steve Barker	Sr
DL	68	Lloyd Gramsrud	So
DL	69	Tom Aldershoe	So
DT	71	Mike Newell	Jr
DE	81	Tom Jarman	Sr
DE	85	Rick Simmons	Jr
DE	86	Tom Doud	So
DL	87	Alan Vance	So
DL	88	Oscar Nelson	So

Special teams

Pos.	#	Name	Class
PK	7	Ricardo Castillo	Sr
P	16	Steve Hunter	Jr

Head coach

- Don Robbins (2nd year)

Coordinators/assistant coaches

- Bob Thompson (OC)
- Ray Fulton (DC)
- Don Matthews (OL)
- Ed Troxel

Legend

- (C) Team captain
- (S) Suspended
- (I) Ineligible
- Injured
- Redshirt

== All-conference ==
Six Vandals were named to the all-Big Sky team, two on offense and four on defense: halfback Fred Riley, guard Andy Kupp, defensive end Rick Simmons, noseguard Steve Barker, and linebackers Ron Linehan and Rand Marquess. The second team also had six Idaho players, with four on offense and two on defense: fullback Frank Doctor, wide receiver Jack Goddard, tackle Larry Bosma, center Ken Muhlbeier, defensive tackle Bill Cady, and defensive back Kelly Courage.

Linehan's selection was his third consecutive, and he was also named the team's most valuable player. Three weeks after the season ended, he received a gunshot wound to his left side; he spent less than two days at Gritman hospital and was released. His younger brothers were also starters for the Vandals: Rick was the strong safety in the late 1970s and Scott was the quarterback in the mid-1980s.

== NFL draft ==
Three Vandal seniors were selected in the 1972 NFL draft, which lasted 17 rounds (442 selections).

Player	Position	Round	Overall	Franchise
Fred Riley	WR	6th	146	Atlanta Falcons
Andy Kupp	G	10th	241	New Orleans Saints
Ron Linehan	LB	17th	428	Pittsburgh Steelers

One junior was selected in the following year's draft in 1973, also 17 rounds (442 selections).

Player	Position	Round	Overall	Franchise
Ken Muhlbeier	C	16th	400	Denver Broncos

Two sophomores were selected in the 1974 NFL draft, which lasted 17 rounds (442 selections).

Player	Position	Round	Overall	Franchise
Bob Van Duyne	G	10th	240	Baltimore Colts
Randy Hall	DB	13th	317	Baltimore Colts
