= 1971 Idaho State Bengals football team =

American college football season

1971 Idaho State Bengals football
- Conference: Big Sky Conference
- Record: 6–4 (2–3 Big Sky)
- Head coach: Ed Cavanaugh (4th season)
- Home stadium: ASISU Minidome

1971 Big Sky Conference football standings
	Conf.					Overall
Team	W		L		T	W		L		T
Idaho $	4	–	1	–	0	8	–	3	–	0
No. 7 Boise State	4	–	2	–	0	10	–	2	–	0
Montana	3	–	2	–	0	6	–	5	–	0
Weber State	3	–	2	–	1	7	–	2	–	1
Idaho State	2	–	3	–	0	6	–	4	–	0
Northern Arizona	1	–	3	–	0	5	–	5	–	0
Montana State	0	–	5	–	1	2	–	7	–	1
$ – Conference champion; Rankings from AP small college poll

The 1971 Idaho State Bengals football team represented Idaho State University as a member of the Big Sky Conference during the 1971 NCAA College Division football season. Led by fourth-year head coach Ed Cavanaugh, the Bengals compiled an overall record of 6–4, with a mark of 2–3 in conference play, and finished fifth in the Big Sky.

== Schedule ==
Date	Opponent	Site	Result	Attendance	Source
September 18	at South Dakota*	Inman Field; Vermillion, SD	W 10–6	9,700	
September 25	Cal State Los Angeles*	ASISU Minidome; Pocatello, ID	W 19–6	9,500–10,000	
October 2	No. 8 Eastern Michigan*	ASISU Minidome; Pocatello, ID	L 22–23	10,000	
October 9	at Idaho	Idaho Stadium; Moscow, ID (rivalry)	L 3–40	14,200	
October 16	at Montana	Dornblaser Field; Missoula, MT	L 35–45	7,000	
October 23	Montana State	ASISU Minidome; Pocatello, ID	W 38–36	10,700	
October 30	Nevada*	ASISU Minidome; Pocatello, ID	W 27–0	8,000–8,500	
November 6	at Portland State*	Civic Stadium; Portland, OR	W 37–0	3,395	
November 13	No. 5 Boise State	ASISU Minidome; Pocatello, ID	W 21–17	13,000	
November 20	Weber State	ASISU Minidome; Pocatello, ID	L 21–28	11,000	
*Non-conference game; Rankings from AP Poll released prior to the game
