= Monroe Eley =

American gridiron football player (1942–2019)

Profile
- Position: Running back

Personal information
- Born: April 17, 1949; Rocky Mount, North Carolina, U.S.
- Died: May 2, 2019; Nashville, North Carolina, U.S.

Career information
- High school: Nashville (NC) Nash Central
- College: Arizona State University
- NFL draft: 1973: 11 / Pick 276th round

Career history
- 1972–1974: British Columbia Lions
- 1975-1977: Atlanta Falcons
- Stats at Pro Football Reference

Monroe Eley (April 17, 1949 – May 2, 2019) was an American professional football running back who played in the Canadian Football League (CFL) and National Football League (NFL).

Having played his college football with Arizona State University, Eley was not drafted by the NFL, so he headed north to play with the British Columbia Lions. In his first year, 1972, he rushed for 517 yards and led the West Conference with 1,033 kickoff return yards. His totals fell in 1973, to 373 rushing yards, as he played behind 1,000 rusher Johnny Musso. The next season Musso was injured and Eley had his best year, racking up 1,176 yards. His fellow running back, Lou Harris also rushed for 1,239 yards, giving the Lions one of the most productive backfields in CFL history.

He wasn't able to reach contract terms with the Lions, so he headed south to the Atlanta Falcons, who had noticed him and drafted him in the 11th round of the 1973 NFL Draft. In 1975, he played only six games, rushing once for three yards and mostly returning kicks. In 1977, he played seven games and rushed for 273 yards, but his average was a low 2.8 yards per carry. This was his final season.
