= Wayne Matherne =

American gridiron football player (born 1949)

Profile
- Position: Defensive back

Personal information
- Born: May 6, 1949 (age 77); Louisiana, U.S.
- Listed height: 6 ft 1 in (1.85 m)
- Listed weight: 195 lb (88 kg)

Career history
- 1971–1974: BC Lions
- 1975–1976: Edmonton Eskimos

Awards and highlights
- Grey Cup champion (1975)

Wayne Jude Matherne (born May 6, 1949) is an American former professional football player who played for the BC Lions and Edmonton Eskimos. He won the Grey Cup with Edmonton in 1975. His nickname was "the Ragin' Cajun". He played college football at Northeastern Louisiana University.
