= Trev Ekdahl =

Canadian gridiron football player (born 1970)

Profile
- Position: Guard

Personal information
- Born: March 4, 1942; Weyburn, Saskatchewan
- Died: September 7, 2005 (aged 63); Vancouver, British Columbia

Career information
- College: Utah State

Career history
- 1967–1974: British Columbia Lions
- 1974: Montreal Alouettes

Trevor Ekdahl (April 3, 1942 – September 7, 2005) was a former professional Canadian football player who played eight seasons with the Canadian Football League's British Columbia Lions. He was the club's player-representative in the 1974 CFL players' strike.

Ekdahl played for the Mount Royal College Cougar football team in Calgary before transferring to Utah State.

He died in 2005 after four years with cancer.
