= Eagle Keys =

Canadian football player and coach (1923–2012)

No. 40
- Position: Center

Personal information
- Born: December 4, 1923; Tompkinsville, Kentucky, U.S.
- Died: December 20, 2012 (aged 89); Burnaby, British Columbia, Canada
- Listed height: 6 ft 3 in (1.91 m)
- Listed weight: 215 lb (98 kg)

Career information
- College: Western Kentucky

Career history

Playing
- 1949–1951: Montreal Alouettes
- 1952–1954: Edmonton Eskimos

Coaching
- 1955–1958: Edmonton Eskimos (A. coach)
- 1959–1963: Edmonton Eskimos (HC)
- 1964: Saskatchewan Roughriders (OC)
- 1965–1970: Saskatchewan Roughriders (HC)
- 1971–1975: BC Lions (HC)

Awards and highlights
- 5× Grey Cup champion (1949, 1954, 1955, 1956, 1966); Annis Stukus Trophy (1968); 3× CFL East All-Star (1949, 1950, 1951); 3× CFL West All-Star (1951, 1953, 1954)
- Canadian Football Hall of Fame (Class of 1990)

Eagle Keys (December 4, 1923 – December 20, 2012) was an American born professional Canadian football player who played and coached in the Canadian Football League (CFL). He is currently fifth all-time in regular season wins with 131 as a head coach in the CFL. He was inducted into the Canadian Football Hall of Fame in 1990.

== Early life ==
Keys was an outstanding center and linebacker for the Western Kentucky Hilltoppers football team in 1942 and, after a stint in the military (Marine Corps) in World War II, 1946 and '47. He also lettered in baseball (pitcher-outfielder) three straight years (1946–48) after the War. He was an All-KIAC (Kentucky Intercollegiate Athletic Conference) selection in football as a senior. His 1946 baseball team went a perfect 9–0, outscoring the opponents by an average of five runs a game.

Eagle "Buddy" Keys was inducted into the Western Kentucky University Athletic Hall of Fame (Football-Baseball '42, '46–48) in 1994.

== Professional career ==
Following his career on the Hill, Keys moved north to play professional football in the Canadian Football League. He was All-Eastern Conference for three straight years (1949–51) with the Montreal Alouettes and then he earned a berth on the All-Western Conference team throughout the next three seasons while playing for the Edmonton Eskimos. He is best remembered as a player for his final game when he played on a broken leg in the Eskimos' 1954 Grey Cup triumph.

== Coaching career ==
After his six years as a player, he put in six more years as an assistant coach in the CFL before being named head coach of the Eskimos in 1959. He coached Edmonton from 1959 until 1963, became an assistant coach with the Saskatchewan Roughriders in 1964 and was promoted to head coach in 1965. He was awarded the CFL Coach of the Year award in 1968. In 1970, the Roughriders finished with a mark of 14 wins and 2 losses, a CFL record that stood until 1989 when Edmonton went 16–2 (by that time, the CFL had expanded its regular season schedule to 18 games). Keys resigned at the end of that season and coached the British Columbia Lions from 1971 until partway through the 1975 season. In 1966, he won his only championship as a head coach, with his Roughriders team winning the 54th Grey Cup (which was also the team's first CFL championship in team history). As such, he was voted the All-Time All-Star Coach for the Saskatchewan Roughriders. In total, he spent 16 seasons as a head coach in the Canadian Football League.

=== CFL coaching record ===
Team	Year	Regular season					Postseason		
Team	Year	Won	Lost	Ties	Win %	Finish	Won	Lost	Result
EDM	1959	10	6	0	.625	2nd in WIFU	2	2	Lost in WIFU Finals
EDM	1960	10	6	0	.625	2nd in WIFU	4	2	Lost in Grey Cup
EDM	1961	10	5	1	.656	2nd in Western Conference	1	1	Lost in Conference Semi-Finals
EDM	1962	6	9	1	.406	5th in Western Conference	–	–	Missed playoffs
EDM	1963	2	14	0	.125	5th in Western Conference	–	–	Missed playoffs
EDM Total		38	40	2	.488	0 Western; Championships	7	5	0 Grey Cups
SSK	1965	8	7	1	.531	3rd in West Conference	0	1	Lost in Conference Semi-Finals
SSK	1966	9	6	1	.594	1st in West Conference	3	0	Won Grey Cup
SSK	1967	12	4	0	.750	2nd in West Conference	3	2	Lost in Grey Cup
SSK	1968	12	3	1	.781	1st in West Conference	0	2	Lost in Conference Finals
SSK	1969	13	3	0	.813	1st in West Conference	2	1	Lost in Grey Cup
SSK	1970	14	2	0	.875	1st in West Conference	1	2	Lost in Conference Finals
SSK Total		68	25	3	.724	4 Western Conference; Championships	9	8	1 Grey Cup
BC	1971	6	9	1	.406	4th in Western Conference	–	–	Missed playoffs
BC	1972	5	11	0	.313	5th in Western Conference	–	–	Missed playoffs
BC	1973	5	9	2	.375	3rd in Western Conference	0	1	Lost in Division Semi-Finals
BC	1974	8	8	0	.500	3rd in Western Conference	0	1	Lost in Division Semi-Finals
BC	1975	1	5	0	.167	5th in Western Conference	–	–	(Fired)
BC Total		25	42	3	.379	0 Western Conference; Championships	0	2	0 Grey Cups
Total		131	107	8	.549	4 Western Conference; Championships	12	12	1 Grey Cup

== Canadian Football Hall of Fame ==
He retired from coaching after the 1975 season and was inducted into the Canadian Football Hall of Fame in 1990. His 131 wins as a coach in the CFL still stands as the fifth highest victory total for a head coach in the league. He was elected as a builder on April 28, 1990.

== Personal life ==
Keys had retired and was living in Burnaby, British Columbia, until his death on December 20, 2012. He and his wife Joyce (née White), also deceased, had five children.

== See also ==
- List of Canadian Football League head coaches by wins
