= Garrett Hunsperger =

Canadian football player (1946–2005)

Profile
- Position: Defensive tackle

Personal information
- Born: October 8, 1946; Kansas City, Missouri, U.S.
- Died: February 26, 2005 (aged 58); Kansas City, Missouri, U.S.
- Listed height: 6 ft 3 in (1.91 m)
- Listed weight: 255 lb (116 kg)

Career information
- College: Central Missouri State

Career history
- 1969–1974: BC Lions
- 1975: Toronto Argonauts

Awards and highlights
- CFL West All-Star (1974)

Harold Garrett Hunsperger (October 8, 1946 – February 26, 2005) was an All-Star Canadian football player who played for the BC Lions and Toronto Argonauts. Considered one of the strongest players in professional football, was a legitimate 500+ pound bench presser. He played college football at Central Missouri State.
