= Eric Guthrie =

Canadian gridiron football player (born 1947)

Profile
- Positions: Quarterback, Kicker

Personal information
- Born: April 27, 1947 (age 79); Vancouver, British Columbia, Canada
- Listed height: 6 ft 1 in (1.85 m)
- Listed weight: 200 lb (91 kg)

Career information
- College: Boise State
- NFL draft: 1972: 14th round, 356th overall pick

Career history
- 1972–1973: BC Lions
- 1974: Detroit Wheels (WFL)
- 1975–1976: BC Lions
- 1977: Montreal Alouettes
- 1977: Saskatchewan Roughriders

Eric Guthrie (born April 27, 1947) is a Canadian-born quarterback who played in the World Football League (WFL) and Canadian Football League (CFL). He played for the BC Lions from 1972–1973, the Detroit Wheels in 1974, the BC Lions from 1975–1976, the Montreal Alouettes in 1977, and the Saskatchewan Roughriders in 1977.

== College football ==
Guthrie played college football in the United States in Idaho at Boise State College. As a senior in 1971, he led the Broncos to a 9–2 record in the regular season, with a No. 7 ranking in the AP small college poll.

At the Camellia Bowl in Sacramento, California, the Broncos were down by 21 points to Chico State after three quarters. Guthrie engineered a 25–0 rally in the fourth quarter to win by four, with two of the three touchdowns on his passes. He also threw for a two-point conversion and made three kicks: two extra points and a field goal.

It was later revealed that Guthrie had signed a professional baseball contract with the Pittsburgh Pirates organization five years earlier in 1966. The NCAA had Boise State return the winner's trophy and $18,000, its share of the gate and other receipts.

Guthrie was selected 356th overall in fourteenth round of the 1972 NFL draft by the San Francisco 49ers.
