= Slade Willis =

Canadian football player (born 1950)

Profile
- Position: Wide receiver

Personal information
- Born: May 1, 1950 (age 76)
- Listed height: 6 ft 1 in (1.85 m)
- Listed weight: 180 lb (82 kg)

Career information
- College: Drake

Career history
- 1973–1976: BC Lions
- 1976: Hamilton Tiger-Cats
- 1977: Winnipeg Blue Bombers
- 1977–1979: Toronto Argonauts

Slade Willis (born May 1, 1950) is a retired Canadian football player who played for the BC Lions, Hamilton Tiger-Cats, Winnipeg Blue Bombers and Toronto Argonauts. He played college football at Drake University.
