= Johnny Musso =

American gridiron football player (born 1950)

No. 22
- Position: Running back

Personal information
- Born: March 6, 1950 (age 76); Birmingham, Alabama, U.S.
- Listed height: 5 ft 11 in (1.80 m)
- Listed weight: 201 lb (91 kg)

Career information
- High school: L. Frazer Banks (Birmingham, Alabama)
- College: Alabama
- NFL draft: 1972: 3rd round, 62nd overall pick

Career history
- BC Lions (1972–1974); Birmingham Vulcans (1975); Chicago Bears (1975–1977)

Awards and highlights
- CFL West All Star (1973); Consensus All-American (1971); Second-team All-American (1970); SEC Player of the Year (1971); 2× First-team All-SEC (1970, 1971); Second-team All-SEC (1969)

Career NFL statistics
- Rushing attempts: 100
- Rushing yards: 365
- Rushing TDs: 6
- Stats at Pro Football Reference
- College Football Hall of Fame

Johnny Musso (born March 6, 1950) is an American former professional football player who was a running back for three seasons with the BC Lions of the Canadian Football League (CFL) and in the National Football League (NFL) with the Chicago Bears. Musso played college football at the University of Alabama, where was a consensus selection on the 1971 College Football All-America Team. He was inducted into the College Football Hall of Fame in 2000.

== Early life ==
Born and raised in Birmingham, Alabama, Musso graduated from L. Frazier Banks High School in 1968, and played college football at the University of Alabama in Tuscaloosa under head coach Bear Bryant. He was an All-American in 1971 and led the Crimson Tide to an undefeated regular season and a berth in the Orange Bowl against top-ranked Nebraska. He was nicknamed The Italian Stallion.

== Professional career ==
Musso was a third round selection in the 1972 NFL draft, with 62nd overall pick, by the Chicago Bears. He opted for a higher offer in Canada, and played for the BC Lions of the Canadian Football League for three seasons (1972–1974), where he ran for 1029 yards in 1973 and was a West All-Star.

In March 1974, he was selected by the Birmingham Americans in the first round, with seventh overall pick, of the WFL Pro Draft. After injuries and being moved to backup to all-star Lou Harris, Musso left the Lions in 1975 for Birmingham where he rushed for 681 yards.

After the WFL folded, he signed with the Bears in late November 1975, and was the backup to Walter Payton. Musso had surgery on his right knee in August 1978 and spent the season on injured reserve; he failed his physical in July 1979 and retired.

== Honors ==
Musso was inducted into the Alabama Sports Hall of Fame in 1989, and the College Football Hall of Fame in 2000.

== See also ==
- Alabama Crimson Tide football yearly statistical leaders
