= Karl Douglas =

American football player (born 1949)

No. 16, 14
- Position: Quarterback

Personal information
- Born: June 17, 1949 (age 77); Houston, Texas, U.S.
- Listed height: 6 ft 2 in (1.88 m)
- Listed weight: 215 lb (98 kg)

Career information
- High school: Worthing (Houston)
- College: Texas A&I
- NFL draft: 1971: 3rd round, 78th overall pick

Career history
- 1971–1972: Baltimore Colts*
- 1972: Buffalo Bills*
- 1973: BC Lions
- 1974: Calgary Stampeders
- 1974: BC Lions
- 1975: Calgary Stampeders
- 1984: San Antonio Gunslingers
- * Offseason or practice squad member only

Karl Michael Douglas (born June 17, 1949) is an American former professional football player who was a quarterback for three seasons in the Canadian Football League (CFL) with the BC Lions and Calgary Stampeders. He was selected by the Baltimore Colts in the third round of the 1971 NFL draft. Douglas was cut by the Colts in 1972 and picked up by the Bills. He played college football at Texas A&I University and attended Worthing High School in Houston, Texas. He was also a member of the San Antonio Gunslingers of the United States Football League (USFL).
