= Barry Ardern =

Canadian football player (born 1946)

Profile
- Position: Defensive back

Personal information
- Born: May 12, 1946 (age 80); Ottawa, Ontario, Canada

Career information
- CJFL: Ottawa Sooners

Career history
- 1968–1973: Ottawa Rough Riders
- 1974–1976: British Columbia Lions
- 1977: Saskatchewan Roughriders
- 1977: Montreal Alouettes

Awards and highlights
- 3× Grey Cup champion (1968, 1969, 1977)

Barry Ardern (born May 12, 1946) is a former defensive back in the Canadian Football League (CFL) for ten years. Ardern won the Grey Cup three times, in 1968 and 1969 with the Ottawa Rough Riders and in 1977 with the Montreal Alouettes.
