= Bill Baker (Canadian football) =

Canadian gridiron football player (born 1944)

No. 65, 76
- Position: Defensive end

Personal information
- Born: April 23, 1945 (age 81); Sherridon, Manitoba, Canada
- Listed height: 6 ft 3 in (1.91 m)
- Listed weight: 255 lb (116 kg)

Career information
- College: Otterbein College

Career history
- 1968–1973: Saskatchewan Roughriders
- 1974–1976: BC Lions
- 1977–1978: Saskatchewan Roughriders

Awards and highlights
- CFL's Most Outstanding Defensive Player Award (1976); 2× Norm Fieldgate Trophy (1975, 1976); Dr. Beattie Martin Trophy (1976); 4× CFL All-Star (1972, 1973, 1975, 1976); 5× CFL West All-Star (1971, 1972, 1973, 1975, 1976)
- Canadian Football Hall of Fame (Class of 1994)

Bill "The Undertaker" Baker (born April 23, 1945) is a Canadian former professional football defensive end who played in the Canadian Football League (CFL).

== Junior and college football ==
Bill Baker played junior football for the Regina Rams in 1963, and college football at Otterbein College, where he was a First Team All-Star for four years.

== Professional career ==
Baker played in a total of 174 games over eleven seasons with the Saskatchewan Roughriders (1968–1973, 1977–1978) and BC Lions (1974–1976). He was a Division All-Star five times, and won the CFL's Most Outstanding Defensive Player Award in 1976 as a member of the Lions.

=== Saskatchewan Roughriders (first stint) ===
In 1968, Saskatchewan had the fewest points allowed in the CFL with 223, including teams in the Eastern division with two fewer games played, but lost in the Western conference final to the Calgary Stampeders. In 1969, the Roughrider defence allowed 261 points, second in the conference, and won the Western conference final, but the passing attack of the Russ Jackson-led Ottawa Rough Riders was too much for them in the 57th Grey Cup.

In 1970, the Saskatchewan defence dominated the league again with 206 points allowed, but could not beat Calgary in the Western conference final, or beat Calgary in the Western conference final in 1971. In 1972, the Roughriders beat the Winnipeg Blue Bombers in the Western conference final, but, despite limiting the Hamilton Tiger-Cats to just 13 points, lost the 60th Grey Cup game because of a weak offence. In the 1973 season, the Roughriders could not get by the Edmonton Eskimos in the Western conference final.

=== BC Lions ===
Baker had a 3-year stint with the BC Lions, less successful as a team than Saskatchewan during this period. In the 1974 season, BC lost to Saskatchewan in the semifinal. In the 1975 and 1976 seasons, the team could not reach the playoffs. Baker won the defensive player of the year award in 1976 despite BC's mediocre 336 points allowed and 5-9-2 record.

=== Saskatchewan Roughriders (second stint) ===
Baker ended his career with a 2-year stint with his former team, Saskatchewan, but neither in 1977 nor in 1978 did Saskatchewan make the playoffs. Thus, Baker's career ended on a losing note, his team finishing last in the Western conference with a record of 4-11-1.

=== Canadian Football Hall of Fame ===
Despite never having played on a Grey Cup winner, Baker was inducted to the Canadian Football Hall of Fame in 1994 and, in 2006, was listed at #43 on the TSN Top 50 CFL Players list. His credo was "your opponents are only as tough as you let them be." According to the Canadian Football Hall of Fame, "a Baker forearm to the head was greatly respected by opposing quarterbacks who came within range."

== Executive career ==
Bill Baker became general manager of the Saskatchewan Roughriders in 1987-1988.

When the CFL split its commissioner role into two positions after the departure of Douglas Mitchell, Baker became CFL president and chief operating officer in 1989, with Roy McMurtry, Q.C. holding the position of chairman and chief executive officer. When Baker resigned, McMurtry continued as chairman and CEO until Crump's appointment but did not serve as acting commissioner.

== Video clips ==
Canadian Football Hall of Fame member on YouTube

Seen in game 3 of the 1970 Western finals against Calgary in its entirety on YouTube
