= Brian Sopatyk =

American gridiron football player (born 1947)

Profile
- Position: Guard

Personal information
- Born: May 31, 1947 (age 79)
- Listed height: 6 ft 2 in (1.88 m)
- Listed weight: 235 lb (107 kg)

Career history
- 1973–1976: BC Lions

Brian Sopatyk (born May 31, 1947) is a retired Canadian football player who played for the BC Lions. He played college football at Boise State University. During the 1960s, he played for the Saskatoon Hilltops.

His brother Jeff also played football.
