= Curtis Wester =

American gridiron football player (1951–1995)

No. 61
- Position: Guard

Personal information
- Born: May 7, 1951; Lawton, Oklahoma, U.S.
- Died: May 8, 1995 (aged 44); Costa Rica
- Listed height: 6 ft 3 in (1.91 m)
- Listed weight: 255 lb (116 kg)

Career information
- College: East Texas State
- NFL draft: 1973: 9th round, 228th overall pick

Career history
- 1973–1975: BC Lions
- 1979: Saskatchewan Roughriders

Awards and highlights
- DeMarco-Becket Memorial Trophy (1974); CFL All-Star (1974); CFL West All-Star (1974); Second-team All-American (1972); First-team Little All-American (1972)

Curtis Wester (May 7, 1951 – May 8, 1995) was a guard in the Canadian Football League (CFL).

Wester played college football at East Texas State where he was selected by the Associated Press as a first-team guard on the 1972 Little All-America college football team. He was drafted by the Cleveland Browns of the NFL. He came to Canada in 1974 and played with the BC Lions for three seasons, his best year being 1974, when he was an all-star and won the DeMarco-Becket Memorial Trophy as best lineman in the West Division (and was runner-up for the CFL's Most Outstanding Offensive Lineman Award). He played 33 regular season games for the Leos. He also played one season, 1979, with the Saskatchewan Roughriders.

In 1990, he was elected to the Texas A&M-Commerce (East Texas State) Athletic Hall of Fame.
