= Brock Aynsley =

Canadian gridiron football player (born 1950)

Profile
- Position: Wide receiver

Personal information
- Born: 18 January 1950 (age 76); Kelowna, British Columbia, Canada
- Listed height: 6 ft 2 in (1.88 m)
- Listed weight: 185 lb (84 kg)

Career information
- College: Washington State University

Career history
- 1973–75: BC Lions
- 1976–78: Montreal Alouettes
- 1978–80: Hamilton Tiger-Cats
- 1980: Winnipeg Blue Bombers

Awards and highlights
- Grey Cup champion (1977); CFL East All-Star (1977)

Brock Aynsley (born January 18, 1950) is a Canadian former professional football player. He was a Canadian all-star and Grey Cup champion wide receiver who played eight seasons in the Canadian Football League (CFL), winning a Grey Cup Championship.

Graduating from Washington State University, Aynsley signed with his home province's BC Lions, playing 31 games for them over 3 years and catching 50 passes for 784 yards and one touchdown. Moving to the Montreal Alouettes for nearly 3 seasons, he would play 41 games with 79 receptions for 1588 yards and 9 touchdowns. His best year was 1977 when he was an all-star and won the Grey Cup with the Larks. He then played parts of 3 seasons with the Hamilton Tiger-Cats; 19 games with 30 catches for 492 yards and 4 touchdowns. He finished his career with 9 games with the Winnipeg Blue Bombers, snagging 5 passes for 74 yards.

His career totals are 100 games, 164 receptions, 2938 yards, a 17.9 yard per reception average, a 105 yard touchdown pass, and 14 touchdowns.
