= Ray Nettles =

American gridiron football player (1949–2009)

No. 51
- Position: Linebacker

Personal information
- Born: August 1, 1949; Jacksonville, Florida, U.S.
- Died: September 29, 2009 (aged 60); Jacksonville, Florida, U.S.
- Listed height: 6 ft 2 in (1.88 m)
- Listed weight: 220 lb (100 kg)

Career information
- College: Tennessee
- NFL draft: 1972: 6th round, 155th overall pick

Career history
- 1972–1976: BC Lions
- 1977: Toronto Argonauts
- 1978: Hamilton Tiger-Cats
- 1979: Ottawa Rough Riders
- 1980: Calgary Stampeders

Awards and highlights
- CFL's Most Outstanding Lineman Award (1973); DeMarco–Becket Memorial Trophy (1973); 3× CFL All-Star (1972, 1973, 1978); CFL East All-Star (1978); 4× CFL West All-Star (1972, 1973, 1974, 1977)
- Canadian Football Hall of Fame (Class of 2005)

Ray Nettles (August 1, 1949 – September 29, 2009) was a football linebacker at the University of Tennessee who played professional Canadian football from 1972 to 1980. He was a five-time Canadian Football League (FL) All-Star and Hall of Famer.

== Early life ==
Nettles was born in Jacksonville, Florida and graduated from Englewood High School in 1968. In his senior year, he was Duval County defensive player of the year and third team All-State.

Nettles accepted a scholarship to the University of Tennessee but spent his first two years as backup to two-time Pro Bowler Jack Reynolds. In the two seasons that Nettles started as linebacker, Tennessee's record was 21–3 and he was named to the All-SEC team in 1971.

== Professional career ==
The Miami Dolphins drafted him in the sixth round of the 1972 NFL draft, but he chose the CFL because they offered twice as much money and the opportunity to play immediately. At Miami, he would have competed for a starting job against All-Pro linebacker Nick Buoniconti. Nettles was quoted in a 1999 Florida Times-Union article, "It's not like I was afraid to play in the NFL. I could have had success there, but I already waited my turn behind Jack Reynolds at Tennessee, and I didn't want to do that again. I wanted to prove myself right away."

Nettles started his pro career for the BC Lions in 1972 and was named to the All-Star team his first year. In his second year, he won the 1973 CFL's Most Outstanding Lineman Award and was again named to the All-Star team. He remained with the Lions through the 1976 season, then played for the Toronto Argonauts in 1977, the Hamilton Tiger-Cats in 1978, the Ottawa Rough Riders in 1979, and the Calgary Stampeders in 1980. He was inducted into the Canadian Football Hall of Fame in 2005.

== Personal life ==
While playing football, Nettles was known as a tough guy with long hair who partied hard and drove fast motorcycles. His profile on the Canadian Football Hall of Fame website states: "He became known as much for his colourful off field personality as for his on field feistiness." Nettles struggled throughout much of his adult life with alcohol and cocaine addictions, which contributed to three divorces and multiple attempts at rehabilitation. He was finally successful in November 2008 after a six-week stay at Willingway Hospital. He explained his attitude in a July 2009 interview:

In my mind, I wasn't suppose [sic] to live past 50, so I didn't take rehabilitation seriously the first few times I tried it. I was always standing on the edge, looking over a cliff, but stepping backwards. A few times, I slipped and saw a couple of the rocks fall and God spared me many times. I just never could figure out why until this past year.

As part of his sobriety, Nettles became a Christian and regained self-respect and dignity, which allowed him to live his final months at peace.

== Death ==
Nettles died at a hospice in Jacksonville, Florida on September 29, 2009, after a long battle with liver and lung cancer.
