= Joe Fourqurean =

American gridiron football player (1950–2013)

Profile
- Position: Defensive back

Personal information
- Born: January 9, 1950; Covington, Virginia, U.S.
- Died: November 19, 2013 (aged 63); Columbus, Ohio, U.S.
- Listed height: 6 ft 1 in (1.85 m)
- Listed weight: 190 lb (86 kg)

Career information
- College: Bluefield State College

Career history
- 1973–1981: BC Lions

Joseph Robert Fourqurean (January 6, 1950 – November 19, 2013) was an American professional football player who played for the BC Lions. He played college football at Bluefield State College. Fourqurean was named to the BC Lions Wall of Fame in 2011.
