= Jim Young =

Canadian gridiron football player (born 1943)

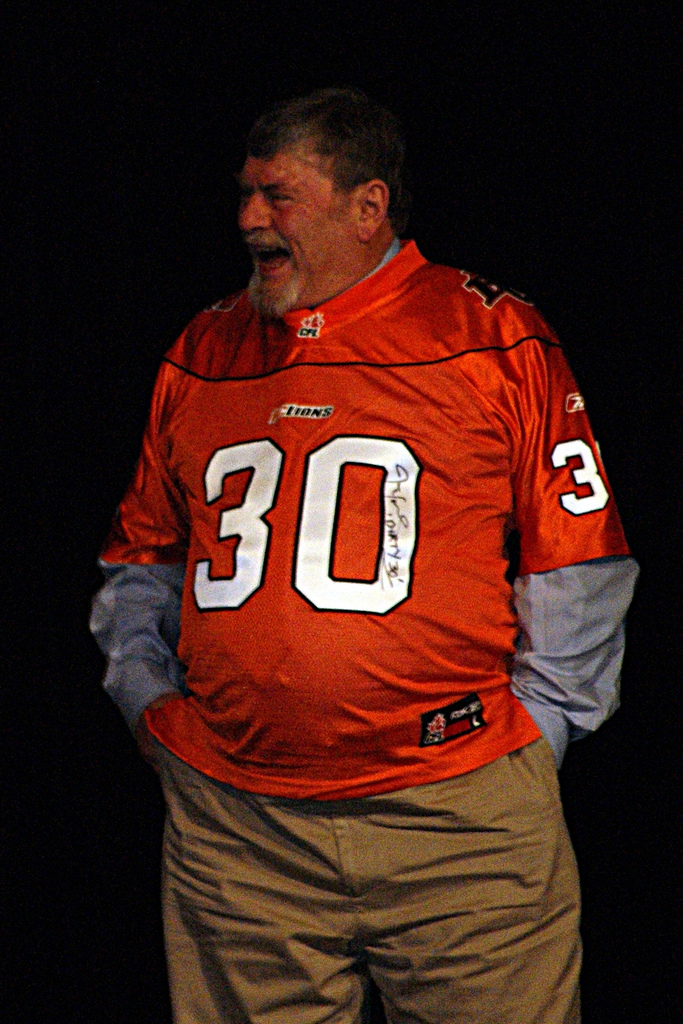
- Young in 2010

No. 34, 30
- Positions: Wide receiver, running back

Personal information
- Born: June 6, 1943 (age 83); Hamilton, Ontario, Canada
- Listed height: 6 ft 0 in (1.83 m)
- Listed weight: 215 lb (98 kg)

Career information
- High school: Westdale (Hamilton)
- University: Queen's
- NFL draft: 1965: undrafted
- CFL draft: 1965: 1st round, 1st overall pick

Career history

Playing
- 1965–1966: Minnesota Vikings
- 1967–1979: BC Lions

Coaching
- 1990: BC Lions (HC)

Awards and highlights
- 2× Most Outstanding Canadian (1970, 1972); 3× Dr. Beattie Martin Trophy (1969, 1970, 1972); CFL All-Star (1972); 2× CFL West All-Star (1969, 1972); BC Lions #30 retired; Canada's Sports Hall of Fame; BC Sports Hall of Fame; Queen's University Football Hall of Fame
- Stats at Pro Football Reference
- Canadian Football Hall of Fame (Class of 1991)

James Norman Young (born June 6, 1943) is a Canadian former professional football player. Young played running back and wide receiver for the NFL's Minnesota Vikings for two seasons (1965–66), and the CFL's BC Lions for thirteen seasons (1967–79). Young is a member of Canada's Sports Hall of Fame, the Canadian Football Hall of Fame, the BC Sports Hall of Fame, and the Queen's University Football Hall of Fame. Young's #30 jersey is one of eleven numbers retired by the BC Lions. In 2003, Young was voted a member of the BC Lions All-Time Dream Team as part of the club's 50th anniversary celebration. In 2006, Young was voted to the Honour Roll of the CFL's top 50 players of the league's modern era by Canadian sports network TSN.

Young was nicknamed "Dirty Thirty", for his aggressive style and jersey number. Sports journalist Jim Taylor wrote a football biography of Young featuring the same name.

== Early life ==
James Norman Young was born on June 6, 1943, in Hamilton, Ontario. He attended Westdale Secondary School in Hamilton. He played CIAU football at Queen's University.

== National Football League – Minnesota Vikings ==
In 1965, Young signed with the Minnesota Vikings of the National Football League. He played Running back/halfback for the Minnesota Vikings in the 1965 and 1966 seasons (playing 6 games, rushing 3 times for 4 yards, and returning 6 punts and 9 kickoffs).

Young wanted to return to Canada, and the BC Lions were very interested in acquiring him, however the Toronto Argonauts had his CFL rights.

The Minnesota Vikings were very interested in signing BC Lions quarterback Joe Kapp.

The Minnesota Vikings general manager at the time was Jim Finks, who had brought Kapp to Canada back in the 1959 CFL season, and their head coach was Bud Grant who had faced Kapp while coaching the Winnipeg Blue Bombers. Both Finks and Grant, wanted to sign Joe Kapp to replace Fran Tarkenton who had been traded to the New York Giants.

To make this possible, the BC Lions traded all-star defensive lineman Dick Fouts, and future Canadian Football Hall of Fame running back Bill Symons to the Argonauts for the CFL rights to Young. They then managed getting Kapp waived out of the Canadian Football League.

The Minnesota Vikings managed getting Young waived out of the NFL. The expansion New Orleans Saints wanted Young and it took some work from Finks to keep them from claiming Young.

Young, now waived from the NFL, signed with the BC Lions and Joe Kapp, who was waived from the CFL, was free to sign with the Minnesota Vikings, who had previously claimed his NFL playing rights from the Washington Redskins.

== Canadian Football League – BC Lions ==
Young played from the 1967 to 1979 season with the BC Lions for 197 games, primarily as a wide receiver. Young was named a CFL All-Star at wide receiver for the 1972 season, and was a two-time Western Conference All Star at two positions (running back in 1969, wide receiver in 1972). Young was awarded the CFL's Most Outstanding Canadian Award in the 1970 and 1972 seasons.

He gained a reputation for his hard nosed play, hence the nickname "Dirty 30". His style of play forced defensive backs to watch out for him.

Young previously held several BC Lions team records, including most receptions, 552, most receiving yards, 9248, and most receiving touchdowns, with 65. These are now all held by Geroy Simon. He is one of only two Lions to surpass the 10,000 yard mark overall and he dominated the Lions offence for many years despite playing with 23 different quarterbacks. He saw action in five playoff seasons for B.C. and still ranks as the fifth all-time leading scorer in club history at 410 points.

Young's #30 jersey is one of eleven numbers retired by the Lions.

== Post-football playing career and awards ==
Young joined the BC Lions team management after his retirement, and coached the Lions on an interim basis during the 1990 CFL season for one game, a 32–13 loss to the Edmonton Eskimos.

In 1991, Young was inducted into the Canadian Football Hall of Fame. In 1994, he was inducted into the BC Sports Hall of Fame. In 2002, he was inducted into Canada's Sports Hall of Fame. In November, 2006, Young was voted to the Honour Roll of the CFL's top 50 players of the league's modern era by Canadian sports network TSN. In 2011, he was an inaugural inductee in the BC Football Hall of Fame.
