= Al Wilson (offensive lineman) =

Canadian gridiron football player (born 1950)

No. 52
- Positions: Centre, Guard

Personal information
- Born: April 6, 1950 (age 76); Duncan, British Columbia, Canada
- Listed height: 6 ft 2 in (1.88 m)
- Listed weight: 240 lb (109 kg)

Career information
- College: Montana State

Career history
- 1972–1986: BC Lions

Awards and highlights
- Grey Cup champion (1985); CFL Most Outstanding Lineman (1977); 3× DeMarco–Becket Memorial Trophy (1976, 1977, 1978); 7× CFL All-Star (1975–1981); 7× CFL West All-Star (1975–1981); BC Lions #52 retired
- Canadian Football Hall of Fame (Class of 1997)

Al "Dirt" Wilson (born April 6, 1950) is a Canadian former professional football player for the BC Lions of the Canadian Football League (CFL). Wilson spent his entire 15-year career with the Lions as an offensive lineman. Wilson played American college football at Montana State University. He is a member of the Canadian Football Hall of Fame, the B.C. Sports Hall of Fame, the B.C. Lions Wall of Fame, and has a street named in his honor, "Al Wilson Grove," in his hometown of Duncan. Wilson's #52 jersey is one of eleven numbers retired by the B.C. Lions. In 2003, Wilson was voted a member of the B.C. Lions All-Time Dream Team as part of the club's 50th anniversary celebration. In 2006, Wilson was voted to the Honour Roll of the CFL's top 50 players of the league's modern era by Canadian sports network TSN.

== Early life and college ==
Wilson attended Cowichan Secondary School in Duncan, British Columbia, where he played defensive end, offensive guard, and tight end for the football team. He went on to play college football at Montana State from 1968 to 1972, where he was the Bobcats' captain during his senior year.

== Professional career ==
Following his graduation from Montana State, Wilson joined the B.C. Lions in 1972. Playing offensive guard, and later, centre, Wilson rarely missed a Lions' game in his 15-year career with the team, finishing with 233 games (he is the second longest-playing Lion in team history behind teammate Lui Passaglia's 408 game record). During his career, Wilson played in 167 consecutive games until a knee injury ended his season in 1982.

In 1983, Wilson was a part of the Lions' 11–5 season that culminated in a Grey Cup matchup with the Toronto Argonauts. The Lions ultimately lost the game, 18–17. Two seasons later, in 1985, Wilson and the Lions returned to the Grey Cup championship game, where they defeated the Hamilton Tiger-Cats 37-24 for the Lions' second Grey Cup.

Wilson's play led to his selection as a Western Division and CFL All-Star for seven consecutive years (1975–1981). Wilson won the DeMarco-Becket Memorial Trophy as the CFL Western Division's most outstanding lineman three years in a row (1976–1978) and won the Scheneley Award as the CFL's "Most Outstanding Offensive Linemen" in 1977.

Following his retirement in 1986, Wilson was inducted into the Canadian Football Hall of Fame and the BC Sports Hall of Fame in 1997. In 2003, Wilson was voted a member of the BC Lions All-Time Dream Team, at the centre position, as part of the club's 50 year anniversary celebration. In 2006, Wilson was voted to the Honour Roll of the CFL's top 50 players of the league's modern era by Canadian sports network TSN.

== Post-football life ==
Since his retirement, Wilson has been active in the Duncan, British Columbia, community, and has sponsored charity events and golf tournaments. Wilson has also spent the past 10 years coaching the Windsor Dukes Football team out of North Vancouver, British Columbia. His coaching has helped the Dukes claim the title of Provincial Champions seven times in the past 10 years.

On Oct. 18, 2008, Wilson was part of the inaugural group inducted into the Duncan/North Cowichan Sports Wall of Fame.

He is married to former curler Robin Wilson.
