= Lou Harris (running back) =

American gridiron football player (born 1950)

Profile
- Position: Running back

Personal information
- Born: January 1, 1950 (age 76); Jackson, Mississippi, U.S.
- Listed height: 6 ft 0 in (1.83 m)
- Listed weight: 205 lb (93 kg)

Career information
- College: Southern California
- NFL draft: 1972: 17th round, 420th overall pick

Career history
- 1973–1976: BC Lions
- 1977: Calgary Stampeders

Awards and highlights
- CFL All-Star (1974); 2× CFL West All-Star (1974, 1975)

Lou Harris (born January 1, 1950) is a former all-star Canadian Football League (CFL) running back.

A graduate of USC, Harris played 4 seasons with the British Columbia Lions. His best year, his second, 1974 saw him rush for 1,239 yards, 3rd best in the CFL. He was an all-star that year, and in rare double, his teammate Monroe Eley also rushed for over a thousand yards (1,176) giving the Lions one of the best single season running games in CFL history. He ran for 958 yards in 1975 and 784 yards in 1976. He finished his career in Calgary in 1977.
