= Gary Robinson (Canadian football) =

Canadian football player (1948–2019)

Profile
- Positions: Defensive lineman, Defensive end, Defensive tackle

Personal information
- Born: July 7, 1948
- Died: February 2019 (aged 70)
- Listed height: 6 ft 4 in (1.93 m)
- Listed weight: 265 lb (120 kg)

Career information
- University: Simon Fraser
- CFL draft: 1969: 2nd round, 10th overallth overall pick

Career history
- 1969–1978: BC Lions
- 1978: Hamilton Tiger-Cats

Gary Robinson (July 7, 1948 – February 2019) was a Canadian professional football player who played for the BC Lions from 1969 to 1978. He previously played football at Simon Fraser University.
