= Layne McDowell =

American gridiron football player (born 1949)

Profile
- Positions: Offensive tackle, Guard

Personal information
- Born: August 12, 1949 (age 77); Des Moines, Iowa, U.S.
- Listed height: 6 ft 3 in (1.91 m)
- Listed weight: 255 lb (116 kg)

Career information
- College: Iowa
- NFL draft: 1971: 10th round, 235th overall pick

Career history
- 1972–1978: BC Lions

Awards and highlights
- CFL West All-Star (1975, 1976, 1977); 2× Second-team All-Big Ten (1969, 1970)

Layne McDowell (born August 12, 1949) is an American former professional football player for the BC Lions of the Canadian Football League (CFL). He was drafted in the tenth round by the New England Patriots in 1971. He never appeared in any games, and was released in 1972.
