= 1976 CFL season =

Canadian Football League season

- East champions: Ottawa Rough Riders
- West champions: Saskatchewan Roughriders

64th Grey Cup
- Champions: Ottawa Rough Riders

CFL seasons
- 1975 1977

Canadian Football League team locations: West, East

The 1976 CFL season is considered to be the 23rd season in modern-day Canadian football, although it is officially the 19th Canadian Football League season.

== CFL news in 1976 ==
For the first time in Canadian Football League history, more than two million fans attended CFL games, with a total attendance of 2,029,586.

In the CFL All-Star Game, the East team defeated the West, 27–16, in front of 21,762 fans at Clarke Stadium in Edmonton. The game was played before the pre-season on May 29, the first time a CFL contest was held in the month of May (and the last time until 2018).

== Regular season standings ==
West Division
| Pos | Team | Pld | W | L | T | PF | PA | PD | Pts |
|---|---|---|---|---|---|---|---|---|---|
| 1 | Saskatchewan Roughriders (C, Q) | 16 | 11 | 5 | 0 | 427 | 238 | +189 | 22 |
| 2 | Winnipeg Blue Bombers (Q) | 16 | 10 | 6 | 0 | 384 | 316 | +68 | 20 |
| 3 | Edmonton Eskimos (Q) | 16 | 9 | 6 | 1 | 311 | 367 | −56 | 19 |
| 4 | BC Lions | 16 | 5 | 9 | 2 | 308 | 336 | −28 | 12 |
| 5 | Calgary Stampeders | 16 | 2 | 12 | 2 | 316 | 422 | −106 | 6 |

(C) First round bye; (Q) Qualified for playoffs

East Division
| Pos | Team | Pld | W | L | T | PF | PA | PD | Pts |
|---|---|---|---|---|---|---|---|---|---|
| 1 | Ottawa Rough Riders (C, Q) | 16 | 9 | 6 | 1 | 411 | 346 | +65 | 19 |
| 2 | Hamilton Tiger-Cats (Q) | 16 | 8 | 8 | 0 | 269 | 348 | −79 | 16 |
| 3 | Montreal Alouettes (Q) | 16 | 7 | 8 | 1 | 305 | 273 | +32 | 15 |
| 4 | Toronto Argonauts | 16 | 7 | 8 | 1 | 289 | 354 | −65 | 15 |

(C) First round bye; (Q) Qualified for playoffs

Saskatchewan and Ottawa have first round byes.

== Grey Cup playoffs ==
The Ottawa Rough Riders are the 1976 Grey Cup champions, defeating the Saskatchewan Roughriders, 23–20, at Toronto's Exhibition Stadium. This was the third championship game between the two teams with Ottawa winning two out of three games. Ottawa's Tom Clements (QB) was named the Grey Cup's Most Valuable Player on Offence and Saskatchewan's Cleveland Vann (LB) was named the Grey Cup's Most Valuable Player on Defence. Ottawa's Tony Gabriel (TE) was named Grey Cup's Most Valuable Canadian.

This was the only year between 1973 and 1982 that the Edmonton Eskimos did not appear in the Grey Cup game.

=== Playoff bracket ===
November 13/14: Conference Semifinals
East
E3 | Montreal Alouettes | 0
E2 | Hamilton Tiger-Cats | 23
West
W3 | Edmonton Eskimos | 14
W2 | Winnipeg Blue Bombers | 12

November 20/21: Conference Finals
E2 | Hamilton Tiger-Cats | 15
E1 | Ottawa Rough Riders | 17
W3 | Edmonton Eskimos | 13
W1 | Saskatchewan Roughriders | 23

November 28: 64th Grey Cup @ Exhibition Stadium – Toronto
E1 | Ottawa Rough Riders | 23
W1 | Saskatchewan Roughriders | 20

== CFL leaders ==
- CFL passing leaders
- CFL rushing leaders
- CFL receiving leaders

== 1976 CFL All-Stars ==
=== Offence ===
- QB – Ron Lancaster, Saskatchewan Roughriders
- RB – Jimmy Edwards, Hamilton Tiger-Cats
- RB – Jim Washington, Winnipeg Blue Bombers
- SB – Art Green, Ottawa Rough Riders
- TE – Tony Gabriel, Ottawa Rough Riders
- WR – Rhett Dawson, Saskatchewan Roughriders
- WR – George McGowan, Edmonton Eskimos
- C – Al Wilson, BC Lions
- OG – Ralph Galloway, Saskatchewan Roughriders
- OG – Dave Braggins, Montreal Alouettes
- OT – Dan Yochum, Montreal Alouettes
- OT – Butch Norman, Winnipeg Blue Bombers

=== Defence ===
- DT – Granville Liggins, Toronto Argonauts
- DT – John Helton, Calgary Stampeders
- DE – Bill Baker, BC Lions
- DE – Junior Ah You, Montreal Alouettes
- LB – Harry Walters, Winnipeg Blue Bombers
- LB – Mark Kosmos, Ottawa Rough Riders
- LB – Roger Goree, Saskatchewan Roughriders
- DB – Lorne Richardson, Saskatchewan Roughriders
- DB – Brian Herosian, Winnipeg Blue Bombers
- DB – Dickie Harris, Montreal Alouettes
- DB – David Shaw, Hamilton Tiger-Cats
- DB – Paul Williams, Saskatchewan Roughriders
- DB – Lewis Porter, Hamilton Tiger-Cats

== 1976 Eastern All-Stars ==
=== Offence ===
- QB – Tom Clements, Ottawa Rough Riders
- RB – Jimmy Edwards, Hamilton Tiger-Cats
- RB – Andy Hopkins, Montreal Alouettes
- SB – Art Green, Ottawa Rough Riders
- TE – Tony Gabriel, Ottawa Rough Riders
- WR – Mike Eben, Toronto Argonauts
- WR – Johnny Rodgers, Montreal Alouettes
- C – Donn Smith, Ottawa Rough Riders
- OG – Larry Butler, Hamilton Tiger-Cats
- OG – Dave Braggins, Montreal Alouettes
- OT – Dan Yochum, Montreal Alouettes
- OT – Jim Coode, Ottawa Rough Riders

=== Defence ===
- DT – Glen Weir, Montreal Alouettes
- DT – Granville Liggins, Toronto Argonauts
- DE – Mike Samples, Hamilton Tiger-Cats
- DE – Junior Ah You, Montreal Alouettes
- LB – Larry Cameron, Ottawa Rough Riders
- LB – Mark Kosmos, Ottawa Rough Riders
- LB – Chuck Zapiec, Montreal Alouettes
- DB – Steve Dennis, Toronto Argonauts
- DB – Phil Price, Montreal Alouettes
- DB – Dickie Harris, Montreal Alouettes
- DB – David Shaw, Hamilton Tiger-Cats
- DB – Larry Uteck, Toronto Argonauts
- DB – Lewis Porter, Hamilton Tiger-Cats

== 1976 Western All-Stars ==
=== Offence ===
- QB – Ron Lancaster, Saskatchewan Roughriders
- RB – Mike Strickland, BC Lions
- RB – Jim Washington, Winnipeg Blue Bombers
- RB – Steve Beaird, Winnipeg Blue Bombers
- TE – Bob Richardson, Saskatchewan Roughriders
- WR – Rhett Dawson, Saskatchewan Roughriders
- WR – George McGowan, Edmonton Eskimos
- C – Al Wilson, BC Lions
- OG – Ralph Galloway, Saskatchewan Roughriders
- OG – Buddy Brown, Winnipeg Blue Bombers
- OT – Layne McDowell, BC Lions
- OT – Butch Norman, Winnipeg Blue Bombers

=== Defence ===
- DT – Tim Roth, Saskatchewan Roughriders
- DT – John Helton, Calgary Stampeders
- DE – Bill Baker, BC Lions
- DE – George Wells, Saskatchewan Roughriders
- LB – Harry Walters, Winnipeg Blue Bombers
- LB – Bill Manchuk, Saskatchewan Roughriders
- LB – Roger Goree, Saskatchewan Roughriders
- DB – Lorne Richardson, Saskatchewan Roughriders
- DB – Brian Herosian, Winnipeg Blue Bombers
- DB – Joe Hollimon, Edmonton Eskimos
- DB – Ken McEachern, Saskatchewan Roughriders
- DB – Paul Williams, Saskatchewan Roughriders

== 1976 CFL awards ==
- CFL's Most Outstanding Player Award – Ron Lancaster (QB), Saskatchewan Roughriders
- CFL's Most Outstanding Canadian Award – Tony Gabriel (TE), Ottawa Rough Riders
- CFL's Most Outstanding Defensive Player Award – Bill Baker (DE), BC Lions
- CFL's Most Outstanding Offensive Lineman Award – Dan Yochum (OT), Montreal Alouettes
- CFL's Most Outstanding Rookie Award – John Sciarra (QB), BC Lions
- CFLPA's Outstanding Community Service Award – George Reed (RB), Saskatchewan Roughriders
- CFL's Coach of the Year – Bob Shaw, Hamilton Tiger-Cats
