= Peter Dalla Riva =

Canadian football player

No. 74
- Positions: Tight end, slotback

Personal information
- Born: December 11, 1945 (age 80); Treviso, Italy
- Listed height: 6 ft 3 in (1.91 m)
- Listed weight: 225 lb (102 kg)

Career information
- CJFL: Oakville Black Knights

Career history
- Montreal Alouettes (1968–1981)

Awards and highlights
- 3× Grey Cup champion (1970, 1974, 1977); 3× CFL All-Star (1972, 1973, 1975); 4× CFL East All-Star (1972, 1973, 1975, 1977); Montreal Alouettes No 74 retired
- Canadian Football Hall of Fame (Class of 1993)

Peter Dalla Riva (born December 11, 1946), is an Italian-Canadian former professional football player who played for the Montreal Alouettes of the Canadian Football League (CFL) at the tight end and wide receiver positions. Dalla Riva played with the Alouettes for his entire 14-year career. He is a member of the Canadian Football Hall of Fame, and has had his jersey number 74 retired by the club.

== Early life ==
Born in Treviso, Italy, Dalla Riva arrived in Hamilton, Ontario, Canada with his family in 1953. Dalla Riva played amateur Canadian football with the Burlington Braves and Oakville Black Knights of the Canadian Junior Football League.

== Professional career ==
Dalla Riva began his professional football career with the Alouettes in the 1968 CFL season as a tight end. He would play for a franchise record 14 seasons, until the 1981 CFL season, including 197 regular season games. He would catch 450 passes for 6,413 yards and scored 55 touchdowns, he was also an excellent blocker. He played in 6 Grey Cup games, winning three: the 58th Grey Cup of 1970, the 62nd Grey Cup of 1974, the 65th Grey Cup of 1977, scoring a touchdown in the latter game, a 7-yard pass from Sonny Wade. He also lost three: the 63rd Grey Cup of 1975, the 66th Grey Cup of 1978, the 67th Grey Cup of 1979. Dalla Riva was named a CFL All-Star 3 times.

== Awards, honours, and post-football life ==
Dalla Riva's jersey number #74, was retired by the Als on October 24, 1981. In 1993, he was inducted into the Canadian Football Hall of Fame. In 2006, Dalla Riva was voted to the Honour Roll of the CFL's Top 50 players of the league's modern era by Canadian sports network TSN.

Since his retirement from professional football, Dalla Riva has contributed significant time to community and charity sports events.
