= 63rd Grey Cup =

1975 Canadian Football championship game

| Edmonton Eskimos | Montreal Alouettes |
|---|---|
| (12–4) | (9–7) |
| 9 | 8 |
| Head coach: Ray Jauch | Head coach: Marv Levy |
| | 1 | 2 | 3 | 4 | Total |
|---|---|---|---|---|---|
| Edmonton Eskimos | 0 | 3 | 6 | 0 | 9 |
| Montreal Alouettes | 6 | 1 | 0 | 1 | 8 |
- Date: November 23, 1975
- Stadium: McMahon Stadium
- Location: Calgary
- Most Valuable Player: Offence: Steve Ferrughelli, RB (Alouettes); Defence: Lewis Cook, DB (Alouettes)
- Most Valuable Canadian: Dave Cutler, K (Eskimos)
- National anthem: The Young Canadians
- Referee: Bill Fry
- Halftime show: The Young Canadians
- Attendance: 32,454

Broadcasters
- Network: CBC, CTV, SRC

The 63rd Grey Cup was played on November 23, 1975, before 32,454 fans at McMahon Stadium in Calgary. In a tight, defensive battle, the Edmonton Eskimos defeated the Montreal Alouettes 9–8. Just before the contest began, a young woman "streaked" during the coin toss.

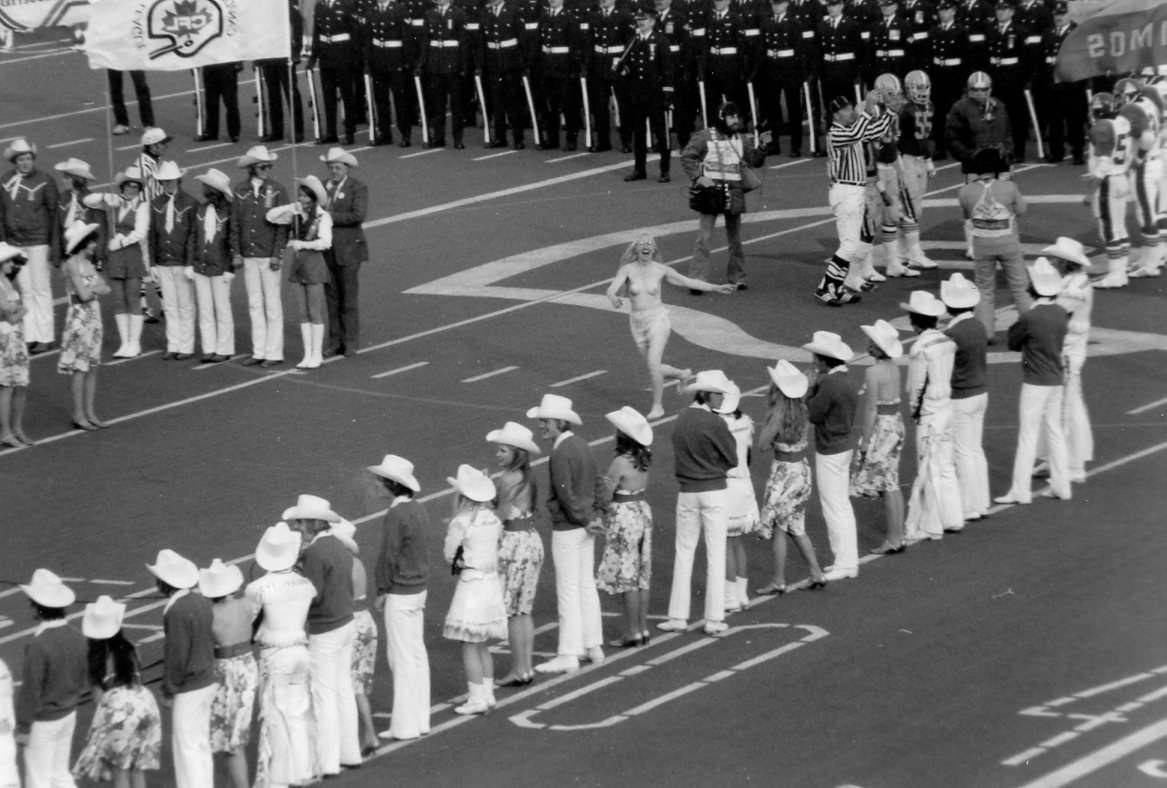
Female streaker running onto the field during the coin toss at the 63rd Grey Cup.

== Box score ==
First quarter

Montreal – FG – Don Sweet 35 yards
Montreal – FG – Don Sweet 47 yards

Second quarter

Edmonton - FG – Dave Cutler 40 yards
Montreal - Single – Don Sweet 32-yard missed field goal

Third quarter

Edmonton - FG – Dave Cutler 25 yards
Edmonton - FG – Dave Cutler 52 yards

Fourth quarter

Montreal - Single – Don Sweet 19-yard missed field goal

| Teams | 1 Q | 2 Q | 3 Q | 4 Q | Final |
|---|---|---|---|---|---|
| Edmonton Eskimos | 0 | 3 | 6 | 0 | 9 |
| Montreal Alouettes | 6 | 1 | 0 | 1 | 8 |

== Game summary ==
Perhaps the defining factor in this low-scoring contest was the chilly weather. The game-time temperature was -15 degrees Celsius, and a 25-kilometre-per-hour wind played havoc with passing and kicking.

Alouette coach Marv Levy's third-quarter decision to gamble on a 3rd-and-3 inside the Edmonton 10 proved to be a turning point, as a successful field goal would have provided sufficient margin for a Montreal victory. Instead, the Eskimos held and kept the Alouettes off the scoreboard. Nevertheless, the Als still had the win within their grasp. With just 3:49 left to play, Sonny Wade came off the Alouette bench to replace starting quarterback Jimmy Jones. Trailing 9-7 and starting from the Montreal 23-yard-line, Wade threw a 26-yard bullet to Larry Smith. He then faked a reverse to Johnny Rodgers and threw a 46-yard pass to Joe Petty. This gave the Als a chance for the game-winning field goal in the final seconds of the game, but Jones mishandled the snap from centre. Don Sweet's 19-yard attempt went wide for a single point and from there, the Eskimos were able to run out the clock.

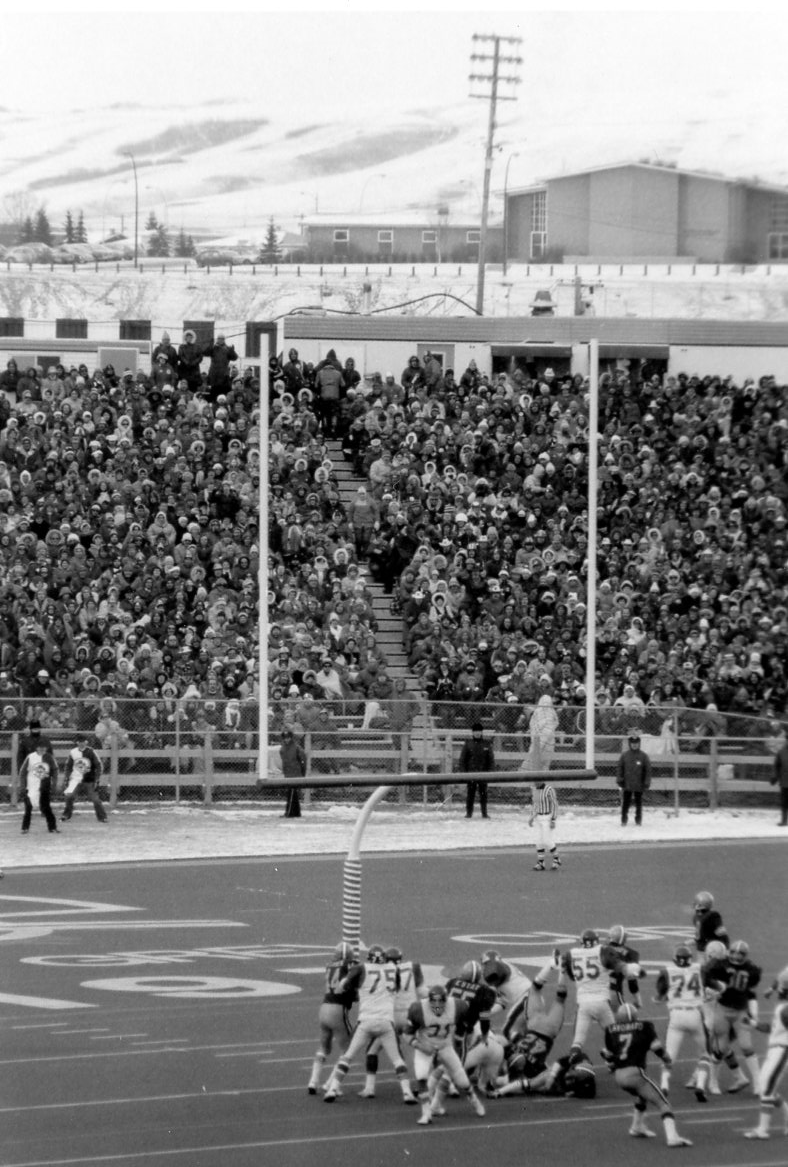
Don Sweet 's missed field goal at the 63rd Grey Cup.

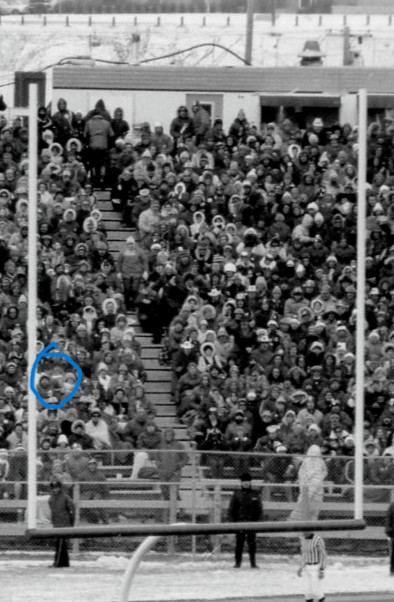
A close up of the football during Don Sweet's missed field goal.

== Trivia ==
Edmonton and Montreal have met in 11 Grey Cup clashes. The Alouettes prevailed at soggy Empire Stadium (Vancouver) in 1974, in the Ice Bowl of 1977 and in 2002. The Eskimos were victorious in 1954, 1955, 1956, 1975, 1978, 1979, 2003 and 2005.

The 1975 game was just the third Grey Cup in which no touchdowns were scored (the others being the 21st Grey Cup and the 25th Grey Cup), and it remains the only such game in the modern era. It's also the only Grey Cup where one player from each team was responsible for all the points scored. Also, for the first time since 1945, all the points were scored by Canadians.

This game was the first Grey Cup played in the city of Calgary and the province of Alberta; it was also the last Grey Cup game held in Western Canada for eight years. Between 1976 and 1982, the game was held in alternating years in either Toronto or Montreal.

This was, until the 2015 Grey Cup, the last Grey Cup championship for the Eskimos that did not involve Hugh Campbell in some capacity with the team; he would be hired as its head coach in 1977, and aside from a brief break from 1983 to 1985, won nine Grey Cups (including five in a row from 1978 to 1982) with the team as either a head coach or general manager until his retirement in 2006.

This was the first Grey Cup appearance of future prime minister Justin Trudeau, then almost four years old, brought to the game by his father, Pierre Trudeau.

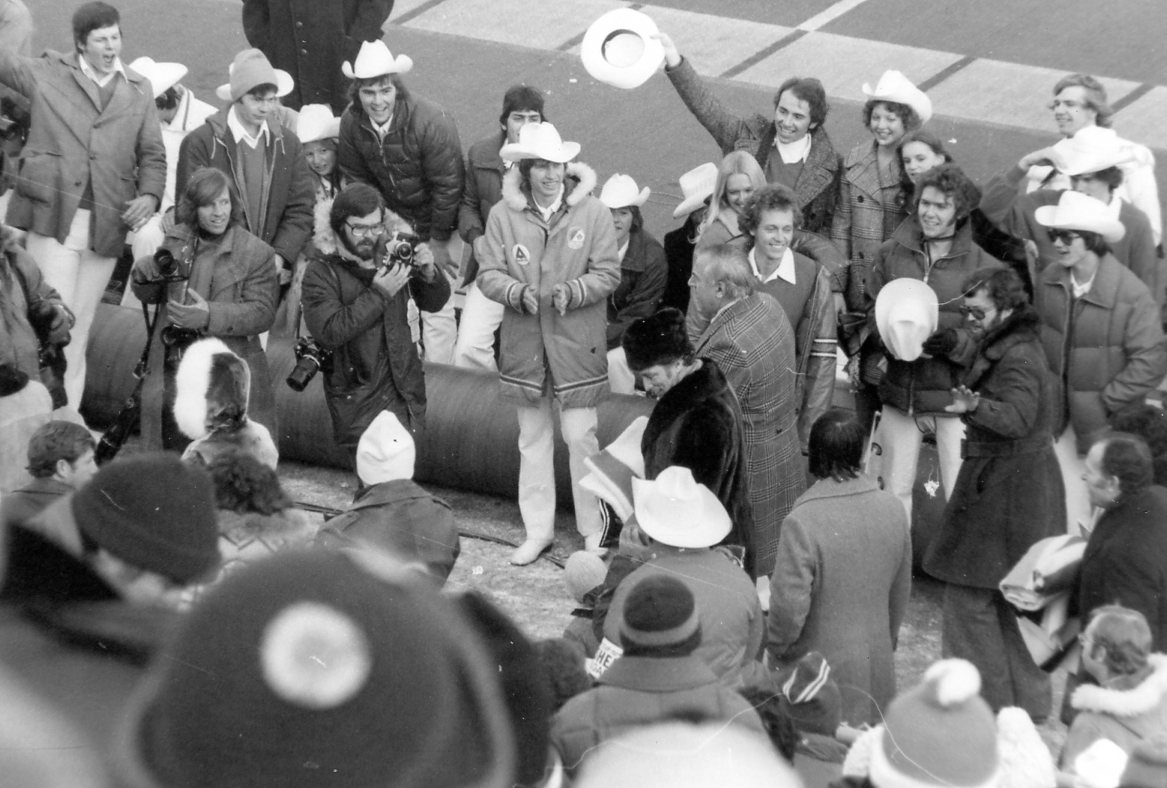
Prime Minister Pierre Trudeau with his young son, Justin attending the 63rd Grey Cup in Calgary..
