= Tony Proudfoot =

Canadian athlete and writer

No. 23/27
- Position: Defensive back

Personal information
- Born: 10 September 1949; Winnipeg, Manitoba, Canada
- Died: 30 December 2010 (aged 61); Montreal, Quebec, Canada
- Listed height: 6 ft 1 in (1.85 m)
- Listed weight: 195 lb (88 kg)

Career information
- High school: John Rennie
- University: New Brunswick
- CFL draft: 1971: 4th round, 36th overall pick

Career history
- 1971–1979: Montreal Alouettes
- 1980–1982: BC Lions

Awards and highlights
- 2× Grey Cup champion (1974, 1977); 2× CFL East All-Star (1977, 1979)
- Canadian Football Hall of Fame (Class of 2008)

John A. "Tony" Proudfoot (10 September 1949 – 30 December 2010) was an All-Star defensive back in the Canadian Football League, teacher, coach, broadcaster and journalist.

He was a Grey Cup champion twice as a player, and twice as special consultant to Montreal Alouettes head coach Marc Trestman in 2009 and 2010. In 2007, Proudfoot was diagnosed with amyotrophic lateral sclerosis, a motor neurone disease for which there is no known cure. He wrote regular updates on his deterioration in the Montreal Gazette. The courage, grace, and determination during his illness was widely admired. He founded the Tony Proudfoot Fund for ALS Research at the ALS Society of Quebec, which raised over $500,000 for research into the disease.

== Early life ==
Proudfoot was born in Winnipeg, Manitoba, and later moved to Pointe-Claire, Quebec. He attended John Rennie High School, graduating in 1966. Proudfoot went on to study at the University of New Brunswick and played as a linebacker for the university's football team. In 1970, he was nominated for the Hec Crighton Trophy, awarded annually to Canada's outstanding intercollegiate football player. In 1971, Proudfoot graduated with a bachelor's degree in physical education.

== CFL career ==
Proudfoot was a Montreal Alouettes draft pick in 1971, and played for them for nine seasons (1971–79, 107 games), including five Grey Cup championship games. Proudfoot initially played as a linebacker, and was cut in that role. However, he was re-signed in 1973 and converted to a defensive back. He played on the Alouette's 1974 Grey Cup winning team. After missing much of the 1976 season because of injury, he moved to defensive half-back. With time, Proudfoot and his fellow players became so experienced that they made the calls on the field; they signalled their plans to defensive coordinator Dick Roach in case he had to show that they were following his plans. He and the team partied extensively in the bars and restaurants of Crescent Street. In July 1977, his coach, Marv Levy, described Proudfoot as a "very smart football player ... [who] gets [the] very best out of himself" and who "isn't selfishly competing with his own teammates". Proudfoot later reflected that his success in professional football was due to being able to work, learn, ask good questions and process information, as "I didn't have great ability".

During the "Ice Bowl" at Montreal's Olympic Stadium, the field was icy and very slippery. Before the game players from the Alouettes and their opponents, the Edmonton Eskimos, tried various solutions to avoid falling, including broomball shoes, and various kinds of cleats, but none were very effective. In the stadium, just prior to the pre-game warm-up, Proudfoot saw a Bell Canada electrician with a staple gun, and tried firing staples into the tip of the cleats on his shoes. Over the course of the game, more and more of the Alouettes players followed suit. Proudfoot later recalled "With that little bit of a grip, it gave you extra confidence. We really knew we had something when Gerry Dattilio caught a short pass from Sonny Wade and ran right past Larry Highbaugh for a big gain. Gerry will tell you that he was not ... well, he was not very fast. And Highbaugh was known as one of the fastest guys in the league. That's when we knew we had something. It was a big factor in that 41–6 win. Proudfoot was a CFL All-Star in 1977 and 1979. He also played three seasons (1980 to 1982, 41 games) with the B.C. Lions. He retired from the CFL at the end of the 1982 season.

== Teaching, coaching and broadcasting ==
During his playing career, Proudfoot began teaching physical education at Dawson College in Montreal in 1977, and continued to work there for 30 years. In the years that followed, he also lectured in exercise science at Concordia University and physical education at McGill. Following his playing career, he received some coaching offers in the CFL, but decided to combine his teaching career, which provided financial stability, with coaching in Montreal. Proudfoot coached youth community teams and school teams in Pointe-Claire, Lower Canada College as well as the Junior Alouettes and the Junior Concordes. during the summers, he worked as waterfront director at Camp Nominingue in the Laurentians from 1987 to 1995. For four years, he served as assistant coach for the Concordia Stingers, including 1998 when the Stingers reached the Vanier Cup. Proudfoot also pursued further education, and received a master's degree in sports science at McGill University.

When the Alouettes returned to the CFL in 1996, Proudfoot became the team's radio analyst on CJAD. He served as assistant coach to Alouettes head coach Rod Rust in 2001, but continued to work as a broadcast analyst, never betraying the confidences of the team and its players during his broadcasts.

In 2002, Proudfoot began planning a book to examine about which traits and qualities result in greatness in a CFL player. Following several years of interviews, research and writing Proudfoot's book entitled "First and Goal: The CFL and the Pursuit of Excellence" was published in 2006. The book includes insights from 44 coaches and players, including Dave Dickenson, Wally Buono and Geroy Simon. Jack Todd described the book as a "compelling analysis of all the factors that make the game entertaining and complex."

Proudfoot saw some of the injured from his office window during the 2006 Dawson College shooting, and descended with his first aid kit. While the shooting continued and until a stretcher arrived about 15 minutes later, he tended to a student who had been shot in the head. The young man survived.

== Illness and death ==
Proudfoot first noticed that his speech was slurred while lecturing at Concordia University in February, 2007. A diagnosis of bulbar onset amyotrophic lateral sclerosis (ALS), a motor neuron disorder, was made in early May at the Montreal Neurological Institute. The disease, also known as "Lou Gehrig's disease", affects the nerve cells of the central nervous system leading to increasing paralysis of muscles that control voluntary movement and, eventually, death. Listeners to his broadcasts as a football analyst on CJAD noticed his speech disorder, and some suggested that he was drunk. As a result, in June 2007, Proudfoot publicly revealed that he had ALS. Proudfoot commented at the time "I'm a physical-education teacher. I've spent my whole life being active, so it's ironic to now get a muscle disease." In addition, Proudfoot noted the irony of a radio broadcaster and teacher losing his ability to speak. His one-time teammate on the Alouettes, Larry Uteck was also diagnosed with ALS and died from it in 2002.

Proudfoot was widely admired for the lack of self-pity, bravery and humour he showed in facing the disease, and for using it as an opportunity for education and to raise money for research. He wrote that he had determined to "Suck it up and get on with life (remember, no whining allowed!) and enjoy every day." Proudfoot retired from Dawson College and Concordia University, but initially continued to work as a football analyst on CJAD. He served as a guest coach for the Alouettes during the team's 2008 training camp. He was invited back for 2009 despite no longer being able to communicate verbally, and instead used a small whiteboard on which he wrote notes or drew diagrams. In 2008, Proudfoot was inducted into the Canadian Football Hall of Fame Football Reporters wing. To make his acceptance speech he used a speech generating device, an electronic communication aid that speaks aloud what the user has typed. In 2008, Proudfoot was awarded an honorary doctorate of science (kinesiology) degree from the University of New Brunswick.

In November 2010, he accepted the CFL's Hugh Campbell Award for Distinguished Leadership before the Grey Cup Eastern Conference final in Montreal from CFL commissioner Mark Cohon. He served as special consultant to the Alouettes head coach, Marc Trestman during the 2009 and 2010 CFL seasons, which were both Grey Cup winning seasons for the team. He was given a Grey Cup ring in the spring of 2010.

After his diagnosis, Proudfoot worked to raise public awareness of ALS. He was interviewed regularly by radio, TV and print media across Canada. With the ALS Society of Quebec, he raised funds for ALS, including setting up the "Tony Proudfoot Fund for ALS research". The funds provide support to ALS patients and their families as well as, the Tony Proudfoot Post-Doctoral Fellowships in ALS Research at the Montreal Neurological Institute (MNI) at McGill University and the McGill University Health Centre. Alouettes such as Anthony Calvillo, Ben Cahoon, Scott Flory and others participated in the fundraising events. Davis Sanchez, a B.C. Lions cornerback and a former Alouette, donated a game cheque to the fund in honour of his former mentor during his time with the Als. By December, 2010, the fund had raised $500,000. Beginning in 2007, Proudfoot wrote a series of articles about his triumphs and challenges with the disease in the Montreal Gazette.

In December, 2010, the newspaper published an emotional farewell address from Proudfoot, recapping previous articles he had written about his struggle with ALS and thanking supporters. In the article, he stated that it would be his last such piece before his death, which he felt was imminent. The same day, Dawson College announced that they would be naming their gyms the "Tony Proudfoot Gymnasium." The college cited "his long service to Dawson College, his careers in professional football and education, his life-saving heroics during the Dawson shooting and his establishment of the fund for ALS research."

Proudfoot was married and had two daughters and a son. Following his diagnosis, the two children who had moved away from Montreal returned to the city. Proudfoot moved to The West Island Palliative Care Residence on 28 December 2010, and died two days later at the age of 61. A final Montreal Gazette column written by Proudfoot and published after his death, expressed his gratitude for his life, family, friends and the care he had received, and his pride that he had fought the illness with determination. Following his death, his brain was donated to research in sports-related brain damage. His brain, unlike others, showed no evidence of chronic traumatic encephalopathy.

== Published works ==
- Proudfoot, Tony (2006). First and goal: the CFL and the pursuit of excellence. Bolton, Ontario: Fenn Pub. ISBN 978-1-55168-316-4.
