= 66th Grey Cup =

1978 Canadian Football championship game

Edmonton Eskimos	Montreal Alouettes
(10–4–2)	(8–7–1)
20	13
Head coach: Hugh Campbell	Head coach: Joe Scannella
	1	2	3	4	Total
Edmonton Eskimos	10	4	3	3	20
Montreal Alouettes	3	0	7	3	13
- Date: November 26, 1978
- Stadium: Exhibition Stadium
- Location: Toronto
- Most Valuable Player: Offence: Tom Wilkinson, QB (Eskimos); Defence: Dave Fennell, DT (Eskimos)
- Most Valuable Canadian: Angelo Santucci, RB (Eskimos)
- National anthem: Boys Chorus of Humberside Collegiate Institute
- Referee: Don Barker
- Attendance: 54,695

Broadcasters
- Network: CBC, CTV, SRC

The 66th Grey Cup was played on November 26, 1978, before 54,695 fans at Exhibition Stadium at Toronto. The Edmonton Eskimos defeated the Montreal Alouettes in a close game, 20–13.

== Box Score ==
First quarter

Edmonton - FG – Dave Cutler 37 yards
Edmonton - TD - Jim Germany 2-yard run (Cutler convert)
Montreal – FG – Don Sweet 32 yards

Second quarter

Edmonton - Single – Dave Cutler 31 yard missed field goal
Edmonton - FG – Dave Cutler 35 yards

Third quarter

Edmonton - FG – Dave Cutler 35 yards
Montreal – TD – Joe Barnes 10-yard run (Sweet convert)

Fourth quarter

Montreal – FG – Don Sweet 31 yards
Edmonton - FG – Dave Cutler 25 yards

Teams	1 Q	2 Q	3 Q	4 Q	Final
Edmonton Eskimos	10	4	3	3	20
Montreal Alouettes	3	0	7	3	13

== Trivia ==
- This was the first of the Eskimos' record five consecutive Grey Cup victories. It was also the first Grey Cup win for a western team in Eastern Canada since the BC Lions won at Toronto in 1964.
- The Als failed to move the ball with any consistency against the Eskimos' fearsome defensive line, the "Alberta Crude": York Hentschel, Ron Estay, David Boone and Dave Fennell, known as Dr. Death. Sonny Wade came off the bench for Montreal and almost led the Als to a comeback victory, but their final drive stalled at the Eskimo 27-yard line.
- Following the game, the Grey Cup was damaged when Edmonton quarterback Tom Wilkinson accidentally dropped the trophy after being bumped by some rowdy fans. Eskimo linebacker Danny Kepley caught it, but he too was knocked around and the mug dropped to the turf and broke. "I shouldn't have dropped the Grey Cup. The Alouettes hit me a lot harder than that," said Wilkinson. (Quote taken from CFL website.)
- Edmonton and Montreal have met in 11 Grey Cup clashes. The Eskimos won in 1954, 1955, 1956, 1975, 1978, 1979, 2003 and 2005's overtime thriller. The Alouettes prevailed in 1974, the Ice Bowl of 1977, and 2002.
