= Dick Suderman =

Canadian gridiron football player (1940–1972)

No. 67 (CGY), 52 (EDM)
- Position: Defensive end

Personal information
- Born: October 18, 1940; Windsor, Ontario, Canada
- Died: October 16, 1972 (aged 31); Edmonton, Alberta, Canada
- Listed height: 6 ft 5 in (1.96 m)
- Listed weight: 245 lb (111 kg)

Career information
- University: Western Ontario

Career history
- 1964–1972: Calgary Stampeders
- 1972: Edmonton Eskimos

Awards and highlights
- Grey Cup champion (1971); Grey Cup Most Valuable Canadian (1971); 3× CFL West All-Star (1967, 1968, 1971)

Richard Suderman (October 18, 1940 – October 16, 1972) was a Canadian Football League defensive end.

== College football ==
Dick Suderman played college football at the University of Western Ontario, where he was a member of the Phi Delta Theta fraternity.

== Calgary ==
Suderman played defensive end for the Calgary Stampeders from 1964 to 1972. He participated in three Grey Cup games, losing the first to the Ottawa Rough Riders in 1968, the second to the Montreal Alouettes in 1970, but defeating the Toronto Argonauts the following year in 1971 by a score of 14–11. Suderman was named the first ever Grey Cup Most Valuable Canadian in that 59th Grey Cup, and awarded a trophy which was renamed the Dick Suderman Trophy in his honour, after his death the following year, just six weeks before the 1972 Grey Cup Championship. The trophy is awarded annually to each Grey Cup's Most Valuable Canadian.

== Edmonton ==
Suderman was traded to the Edmonton Eskimos during the course of the 1972 CFL season. The day after his first game as an Eskimo against the BC Lions, Suderman collapsed while having breakfast in a downtown restaurant with teammates, following their return from Vancouver, and died without regaining consciousness a few hours later of a brain hemorrhage, only two days shy of his 32nd birthday. Despite the close proximity to the game, the doctors' opinion was that the hemorrhage was not related to football play, but caused by a congenital malformation of blood vessels. The Most Valuable Canadian award in the Grey Cup was renamed in his honour.

== See also ==
- List of gridiron football players who died during their careers
