= 58th Grey Cup =

1970 Canadian Football championship game

Montreal Alouettes	Calgary Stampeders
(7–6–1)	(9–7)
23	10
Head coach: Sam Etcheverry	Head coach: Jim Duncan
	1	2	3	4	Total
Montreal Alouettes	6	3	7	7	23
Calgary Stampeders	7	0	3	0	10
- Date: November 28, 1970
- Stadium: CNE Stadium
- Location: Toronto
- Most Valuable Player: Sonny Wade, QB (Alouettes)
- Referee: Don Barker
- Attendance: 32,669

Broadcasters
- Network: CBC, CTV, SRC

The 58th Grey Cup was played on November 28, 1970, before 32,669 fans at CNE Stadium in Toronto. The Montreal Alouettes defeated the Calgary Stampeders 23–10. The 1970 Grey Cup marks the only time in CFL history that two third-place teams have met in the championship game. The contest itself was marred by woeful field conditions, as throughout the game several sections of the natural-grass surface came away in chunks.

== Box Score ==
First quarter

Calgary – TD – Hugh McKinnis 5-yard run (Larry Robinson convert)
Montreal – TD – Ted Alflen 10-yard pass from Moses Denson (convert no good)

Second quarter

Montreal – FG – George Springate 21-yard field goal

Third quarter

Calgary – FG – Larry Robinson 21-yard field goal
Montreal – TD – Tom Pullen 7-yard run (George Springate convert)

Fourth quarter

Montreal – TD – Garry Lefebvre 10-yard pass from Sonny Wade (George Springate convert)

Teams	1 Q	2 Q	3 Q	4 Q	Final
Montreal Alouettes	6	3	7	7	23
Calgary Stampeders	7	0	3	0	10

== Trivia ==
Both teams finished the regular season third in their respective conferences. Montreal was third place in the Eastern Conference at 7-6-1, and Calgary was third in the Western Conference with a 9-7-0 record.

The Alouettes were coached by former Als great Sam Etcheverry, and would be the Eastern Conference representative in the Grey Cup six times during the 1970s. Montreal met both Alberta teams during that span. This was their only meeting with Calgary; the other five times, they met the Edmonton Eskimos.

In the fourth quarter, Als quarterback Sonny Wade demonstrated the condition of the turf when he hurled a huge chunk of grass out of the way so the officials could make a measurement. For his part, Stampeder head coach Jim Duncan called the field a "disgrace." As a result of the poor field conditions, the City of Toronto installed AstroTurf two years later. The turf was in place by the time CNE Stadium hosted its next Grey Cup in 1973.

The 1970 game was the last Grey Cup played on natural grass until the 1984 game at Edmonton's Commonwealth Stadium. This was also the final Grey Cup game to be played on a Saturday; from 1971 on, all subsequent Grey Cup games took place on a Sunday. The 1969 Grey Cup was the first to be played in full on a Sunday.

Sonny Wade won the first of his three Grey Cup Most Valuable Player awards.

== Videos ==
- Entire game on YouTube

== Video clips ==
- (Black and white) (color) videos of the entire game
- 1 minute video of the game
