= Don Barker =

Don or Donald Barker may refer to:

- Don Barker (actor) (born 1938/9), Australian actor
- Don Barker (politician) (1904–1956), Australian politician
- Donald Barker (1929–2016), Canadian CFL referee

Fictional characters

- Don Barker (Dream Team), a character in the TV series Dream Team
