= Junior Ah You =

American Samoan football player (born 1948)

No. 72, 77
- Position: Defensive end

Personal information
- Born: December 30, 1948 (age 77); Faleniu, American Samoa
- Listed height: 6 ft 3 in (1.91 m)
- Listed weight: 233 lb (106 kg)

Career information
- High school: Kahuku (Kahuku, Hawaii, U.S.)
- College: Arizona State
- NFL draft: 1972: 17th round, 425th overall pick

Career history
- 1972–1981: Montreal Alouettes
- 1983: Chicago Blitz
- 1984: New Orleans Breakers
- 1985: Arizona Outlaws

Awards and highlights
- 2× Grey Cup champion (1974, 1977); 1974 Grey Cup Most Valuable Player (Defence); 2× CFL All-Star (1976, 1979); 4× CFL East All-Star (1974, 1975, 1976, 1979); Second-team USFL All-Time Team; Second-team All-American (1971)

Career CFL statistics
- Games played: 129
- Sacks: 5.5
- Fumble recoveries: 7
- Interceptions: 1
- Canadian Football Hall of Fame (Class of 1997)

Miki "Junior" Ah You (born December 30, 1948) is an American Samoan former professional football player who played primarily at the defensive end position. Ah You enjoyed most of his professional career success with the Canadian Football League (CFL) Montreal Alouettes, from 1972 to 1981, and was a former collegiate standout at Arizona State University. Ah You's jersey #77 is one of ten retired by the Alouettes, and he was inducted into the Canadian Football Hall of Fame in 1997. Ah You is also a member of the Arizona State Sports Hall of Fame and the Hawaii Sports Hall of Fame. In 2006, Ah You was voted to the Honour Roll of the CFL's Top 50 players of the league's modern era by Canadian sports network TSN.

== Early life ==
Born in American Samoa, Ah You and his family later moved to Hawaii, where Ah You excelled in high school basketball and football at Kahuku High School. Ah You graduated from high school in 1969, and left Hawaii to play college football at Arizona State.

== College career ==
Ah You was named co-outstanding player in the Sun Devils' 1970 Peach Bowl victory over North Carolina and outstanding defensive player in the 1971 victory over Florida State in the inaugural Fiesta Bowl. Ah You was a three-time All-Western Athletic Conference selection at defensive end. In 1971, he was selected as a United Press International second-team All-American. In 1972, Ah You was selected to play in the post-season Hula Bowl.

== Professional career ==
Following college, Ah You was drafted in the 17th round (425th overall pick) of the 1972 NFL draft by the NFL New England Patriots. Ah You spurned the Patriots and the NFL, opting to join the CFL Montreal Alouettes prior to the start of the 1972 CFL season.

According to a 2007 interview, Ah You joined the Alouettes in part due to the Patriots' desire for him to play the linebacker position, rather than Ah You's natural position at defensive end:

(The NFL) wanted to move me to linebacker. In Canada, they let me play where I was accustomed to.

Ah You played defensive end with the Alouettes for nine seasons (1972-1981), helping the team win two Grey Cup championships in 1974 and 1977. Ah You won the Grey Cup Most Valuable Player (Defence) in the 1974 championship game, and was a CFL All-Star in two seasons (1976 and 1979). He helped recruit Clifton Alapa and Eletise Fiatoa to the Alouettes.

Following his final season with the Alouettes in 1981, Ah You was lured by George Allen to play in the United States Football League, where Ah You played 2 more professional football seasons. In 1983, he suited up with the USFL's Chicago Blitz and then was traded to the New Orleans Breakers prior to the 1984 campaign. In 1985, Ah You finished his career with the Arizona Outlaws retiring mid-season on April 22, 1984.

Ah You retired after the end of the 1985 USFL season with the Outlaws, who were then coached by Ah You's former college coach, Arizona State coach Frank Kush.

== Post-football and personal life ==
Ah You is a member of the Hawaii Sports Hall of Fame. He is currently a prominent citizen of Laie, Hawaii. Ah You currently devotes his time to community activities such as the "Junior Ah You Basketball Tournament" and the "Junior Ah You Christmas Football Bowl."

Ah You has many relatives who have played college football. His nephew C.J. Ah You played for the University of Oklahoma and was selected in the seventh round of the 2007 NFL draft by the Buffalo Bills. Nephew Jonathan JT Mapu played for the University of Tennessee and was a free agent with the Washington Redskins. Nephews EJ Reid and Tori Taulogo played for Utah State University. EJ Reid was a free agent with the St. Louis Rams. Nephew Eldon Tuiasosopo plays for Dixie State University, and Eldon's brother Isaiah plays for Austin Peay State University in Clarksville, Tennessee. Nephew Matt Ah You played at BYU from 2004 until 2008. Ah You's brother Charles lettered at BYU (1975–78). Ah You's sons, Kingsley (1992–1993) and Harland (1995–97) also played at BYU. Sons Miki Junior and Quin played for Dixie State College, and son Joshua played in Arizona for Mesa Community College.

Ah You also runs a restaurant in Kahuku (on the island of O'ahu) named Tita's Grill. With his son Kingsley, he co-owns and operates a company and website that showcases local Hawaiian high school, youth, and amateur sports.
