= Joe Barnes =

American gridiron football player (born 1951)

No. 7, 17
- Position: Quarterback

Personal information
- Born: December 18, 1951 (age 74); Fort Worth, Texas, U.S.

Career information
- College: Texas Tech
- NFL draft: 1974: 13 / Pick 316th round

Career history
- 1974: Chicago Bears
- 1976–1980: Montreal Alouettes
- 1981: Saskatchewan Roughriders
- 1982–1984: Toronto Argonauts
- 1985: Calgary Stampeders
- 1985: Montreal Concordes
- 1986: Montreal Alouettes

Awards and highlights
- 2× Grey Cup champion (1977, 1983); Grey Cup MVP (1983); First-team All-SWC (1973); Second-team All-SWC (1972)
- Stats at Pro Football Reference

Joe Barnes (born December 18, 1951) is an American former professional football quarterback, who played in both the National Football League (NFL) and the Canadian Football League (CFL).

== College career ==
Barnes was a graduate of Texas Tech University, playing from 1971 to 1973, and was inducted into the Texas Tech Athletic Hall of Honor in 1986.

== Professional career ==
Barnes was drafted by the Chicago Bears in the 13th round (316th overall) of the 1974 NFL Draft. He played only two games for Chicago in 1974, completing two of nine passes, and punting once for 27 yards.

He moved to Canada in 1976 and began a five-year stint with the Montreal Alouettes. He began by sharing quarterback duties with Sonny Wade, but mostly took over in 1978, when he threw for 1,177 yards, and in 1979, when he added 2,456 yards. He won a Grey Cup in 1977 and was quarterback for the 1978 and 1979 Cup losses to the Edmonton Eskimos. He lost his starting quarterback job in 1980 to Gerry Dattilio after six games, and was traded to the Saskatchewan Roughriders. Again, he shared quarterback duties for the Green Riders with John Hufnagel, and after the 1981 season headed to Toronto.

It was with the Toronto Argonauts that Barnes enjoyed his greatest success in the team's run and shoot offence. At first, due to injury and the excellent play of Condredge Holloway, Barnes played sparingly in 1982. Starting in 1983, he worked in tandem with Holloway. For two seasons, the tandem combined for over 5,000 yards. In 1983 Holloway passed for 3,184 yards and Barnes, 2,274. The next season the numbers reversed, with Barnes passing for 3,128 yards and Holloway, 2,231. Barnes helped lead Toronto to a long-awaited Grey Cup victory in 1983 (it was also his second Grey Cup title of his career). As was his style, he came off the bench in the second half and engineered the game-winning drive and touchdown, a pass to Cedric Minter, in the final minutes. He was named the Grey Cup Most Valuable Player for his heroics.

In 1984, he was named an all-star. In 1985, he was traded to the Calgary Stampeders but the team struggled for wins. After 11 games he was returned to Montreal in a trade, now with the Montreal Concordes, and played with the briefly renamed and reborn Alouettes in 1986.

Barnes was known for his unpredictable and effective scrambling.
