= Most Valuable Canadian =

Most Valuable Canadian or Canadian MVP may refer to:

- CFL's Most Outstanding Canadian Award, awarded to the best Canadian player in the Canadian Football League
- Grey Cup Most Valuable Canadian, best Canadian player in Canadian Football League championship game who receives the Dick Suderman Trophy
