= Chuck Ealey =

American gridiron football player (born 1950)

Profile
- Position: Quarterback

Personal information
- Born: January 6, 1950 (age 76); Portsmouth, Ohio, U.S.
- Listed height: 6 ft 1 in (1.85 m)
- Listed weight: 195 lb (88 kg)

Career information
- High school: Notre Dame
- College: Toledo

Career history
- 1972–1974: Hamilton Tiger-Cats
- 1974–1975: Winnipeg Blue Bombers
- 1975–1978: Toronto Argonauts

Awards and highlights
- Grey Cup champion (1972); Grey Cup MVP (1972); CFL's Most Outstanding Rookie Award (1972); CFL East All-Star (1972); First-team All-American (1971); 3× MAC Offensive Player of the Year (1969–1971); Toledo Rockets No. 16 retired
- College Football Hall of Fame

Charles Ealey (born January 6, 1950) is an American former professional football player for the Hamilton Tiger-Cats, Winnipeg Blue Bombers and Toronto Argonauts of the Canadian Football League (CFL). He became the first black quarterback to win the Grey Cup when he led Hamilton to the title in 1972. Ealey played college football at the University of Toledo and high school football for Notre Dame High School in Portsmouth, Ohio. He finished his high school career without a single loss and is one of only two FBS quarterbacks to finish their collegiate careers undefeated with at least 25 games played (the other being Jimmy Harris of Oklahoma). Ealey was also named to several All-American teams as a senior at Toledo.

== Early life and college ==
From 1964 to 1967, Ealey played for Notre Dame High School under Ohio High School Football Coaches Association Hall of Famer Ed Miller. In 1967, Notre Dame captured its first Ohio High School Athletic Association state championship. Ealey was lightly recruited despite finishing his high school career with an undefeated record. He was offered a football scholarship to Miami University with then-coach Bo Schembechler to be the team's third-string quarterback, but Ealey refused. Ealey was then offered a scholarship by University of Toledo Head Coach Frank Lauterbur with an opportunity to start at quarterback right away. Ealey accepted the offer and would lead Toledo to 35 consecutive wins in a three-year span from 1969–1971. Ealey's greatest triumph with Toledo was helping the Toledo Rockets win the 1970 Tangerine Bowl. Ealey led the Rockets to three straight Top 20 finishes and three straight Tangerine Bowl victories during their run of unbeaten seasons, winning the MVP award in all three games.

In 1971, Ealey's senior season, he was named First Team All-American by Football News, Second Team All-American by the United Press International, and Third Team All-American by the Associated Press. He also finished eighth in the voting for the 1971 Heisman Trophy, which was awarded to Pat Sullivan of Auburn. Ealey finished his career as a three-time first team all-conference selection, and a three-time Back of the Year selection in the Mid-American Conference, leading the conference in passing yards in 1970 and 1971. His jersey is one of four retired jerseys in the history of Toledo football, and was elected to the MAC Hall of Fame as a charter member in 1988. Due to his amateur accomplishments, Ealey is a member of the College Football Hall of Fame. He was passed by in the 1972 NFL draft, after making it known that he only wanted to play quarterback at a time when African-American quarterbacks were not seriously considered in the NFL.

== Professional career ==
In 1972, Ealey signed with the Hamilton Tiger-Cats of the Canadian Football League (CFL). He did not start as quarterback until the third game of his rookie season, but then proceeded to lead Hamilton to an 11–3 record and first place in the East Division. Ealey won the CFL's Most Outstanding Rookie Award and was named to the CFL All-Star team. He helped secure a 13–10 last minute victory over the Saskatchewan Roughriders in the 60th Grey Cup, when he also won the Grey Cup Most Valuable Player award after passing for 291 yards and a touchdown and rushing for 63 yards.

Ealey was traded to the Winnipeg Blue Bombers halfway through the 1974 season and played one and a half injury-plagued seasons with the Bombers. In 1975, he was traded to the Toronto Argonauts and played three seasons before suffering a career-ending collapsed lung in 1978. In total, Ealey played seven seasons in the CFL, passing for 13,326 yards and 82 touchdowns.

== Personal life ==
Ealey is now a regional director for Investors Group in Mississauga, and makes radio appearances as an investment and finance commentator on radio stations in the area. He currently lives in Brampton with his wife. He has three children and seven grandchildren (6 grandsons and 1 granddaughter). Ealey's son, Damon, also played football for the University of Toledo in 1995.

A documentary film on his life, Undefeated: The Chuck Ealey Story was aired on November 27, 2008.

Chuck Ealey is one of a number of black athletes featured in Choice of Colours: The Pioneering African-American Quarterbacks Who Changed the Face of Football, a book for young readers released in 2008. Chuck is also the subject of the 2012 documentary "The Stone Thrower." It is part of Engraved on a Nation, a series of eight documentaries celebrating the 100th Grey Cup that aired on TSN in October 2012.

Ealey's daughter, writer and broadcaster Jael Ealey Richardson, has also written about Ealey's life in a memoir published in 2012 and a children's book adaptation published in 2015, both under the title The Stone Thrower.
