= 65th Grey Cup =

1977 Canadian Football championship game

Montreal Alouettes	Edmonton Eskimos
(11–5)	(10–6)
41	6
Head coach: Marv Levy	Head coach: Hugh Campbell
	1	2	3	4	Total
Montreal Alouettes	10	0	20	11	41
Edmonton Eskimos	0	3	3	0	6
- Date: November 27, 1977
- Stadium: Olympic Stadium
- Location: Montreal
- Most Valuable Player: Offence: Sonny Wade, QB (Alouettes); Defence: Glen Weir, DT (Alouettes)
- Most Valuable Canadian: Don Sweet, K (Alouettes)
- National anthem: Roger Doucet
- Referee: Bill Dell
- Attendance: 68,318

Broadcasters
- Network: CBC, CTV, SRC

The 65th Grey Cup, also known as The Ice Bowl or The Staples Game, was played on November 27, 1977, at Montreal's Olympic Stadium. The hometown Montreal Alouettes defeated the Edmonton Eskimos by a score of 41–6.

== Game Summary ==
Two days prior to the 1977 Grey Cup, a blizzard hit Montreal. Stadium crews salted the field to melt the snow, but when the temperature plunged the next day, the melted snow turned into a sheet of ice. To combat the conditions, many Alouettes players affixed staples to the bottom of their shoes in order to get good traction. This move was spearheaded by star defender Tony Proudfoot. The game was the third Grey Cup meeting in four years between the Alouettes and the Edmonton Eskimos. With a record Grey Cup crowd of 68,318 at Montreal's Olympic Stadium, the home team did not disappoint in a 41-6 rout over their Western rivals.

Sonny Wade completed 22 of 40 passes for 340 yards and three touchdowns. He was intercepted once. Montreal had a total offence of 424 yards, making 21 first downs. The Eskimos were held to just 102 yards and turned the ball over 10 times, six times in the first half alone. The kicking game carried over from the 1975 Grey Cup as both Montreal's Don Sweet and Edmonton's Dave Cutler scored all the points in the first half. Sweet was good on three field goal attempts and missed on one for a single point. With Edmonton trailing 10-0, Cutler finally put the Eskimos on the scoreboard on the final play of the second quarter, connecting on a nine-yard field goal. Sweet booted two field goals, and Cutler kicked another before a Grey Cup touchdown drought spanning eight quarters between these teams was finally put to rest. Edmonton running back Angelo Santucci's fumble set up an Alouettes scoring drive. Wade threw a seven-yard touchdown pass to Peter Dalla Riva to put the Alouettes ahead 23-6. Just prior to the start of the fourth quarter, Wade threw a 10-yard major to a wide-open John O'Leary, and the rout was on.

Cornerback Vernon Perry returned an interception a Grey Cup record 74 yards to help set up Wade's seven-yard touchdown pass to Bob Gaddis. Sweet added a single and field goal to complete the scoring. Sweet set a number of records in the game, including six field goals and 23 total points, records which still stand. This game marked the Alouettes' third and final championship of the 1970s. For the Eskimos, it marked their fourth loss in five trips to the final since 1960.

== Ice Bowl ==
Although Olympic Stadium was designed to have a retractable roof, and a roof was added in 1987, the stadium was an open-air facility in November 1977. As is common in late November, Montreal received a fair amount of snow before game time.

Stadium crews put salt on the field to melt the snow. But when the temperature dropped on game day, the snow turned into a sheet of ice. The game was marred by several fumbles on otherwise routine snaps of the ball. However, the Alouettes had a competitive advantage: they affixed staples to the bottom of their sneakers to get traction on the slippery surface. The Eskimos, using standard football cleats, never quite found their footing on the icy AstroTurf field (which had a carpet-like texture then, unlike modern artificial turf systems).

Tony Proudfoot, Alouette defensive back:

We just had our 25th anniversary reunion of the team which beat Edmonton in the 1977 so-called Staples Game.

I was asked about it again, of course. It was icy cold and there had been a big snowstorm with a transit strike, and fans walking all the way from downtown to Olympic Stadium.

The field was a skating rink. Guys were trying different kinds of footwear - broomball shoes and things like that. All week long we'd been thinking of what footwear to use. We knew it was going to be slippery and nothing, really, was any good. On a frozen field a lot of players like to wear broomball shoes. But they didn't work very well.

Another alternative, because the field was so hard, was screw-on cleats. Nobody really used those anymore, but they were available. We tried grass cleats, Astroturf cleats, nothing worked. I experimented during the week. I even thought about putting nails through my shoes.

By game day, a bunch of guys settled on using steel cleats. Before the warm-up, I noticed a guy from Bell Canada walking by with a staple gun. A light bulb went on. 'I've tried everything, but not that.' So I tried putting staples in my shoes. I stapled an 'X' on about six bumps. Gordon Judges and Chuck Zapiec put some in, too. We looked at each other and said, 'That's it.'

At the start of the game, about 12 guys had them in and by halftime it was half or three-quarters of the team. The numbers aren't precise because this wasn't organized.

The coaches weren't in on it and the equipment guys had nothing to do with it. It was just the players. Wally Buono was involved. In my opinion it made a big difference. With that little bit of a grip, it gave you extra confidence. We really knew we had something when Gerry Dattilio caught a short pass from Sonny Wade and ran right past Larry Highbaugh for a big gain. Gerry will tell you that he was not ... well, he was not very fast. And Highbaugh was known as one of the fastest guys in the league.

That's when we knew we had something. It was a big factor in that 41-6 win. To me, it was a big deal. I still have that staple gun. To me it's a prized possession.

— Quote from online article by Terry Jones of the Edmonton Sun, Nov. 22, 2002.

== Records ==
- The game set a Grey Cup attendance record of 68,318 (which still stands as of 2026), even though it was a bitterly cold day and Montreal was in the midst of one of its frequent transit strikes. Local fans led the many football tourists to the game in a march across town, trekking from downtown to the east-end stadium on the morning of the game.
- Alouettes defensive back Vernon Perry's 4th quarter 74-yard interception return is the longest in Grey Cup history.
- Don Sweet's 23 points scored is still a single game Grey Cup record for most points in a championship game by a placekicker.
- Edmonton and Montreal have met in 11 Grey Cup clashes. The Eskimos prevailed in 1954, 1955, 1956, 1975, 1978, 1979, 2003 and 2005's overtime thriller. The Alouettes were victorious in 1974, the Ice Bowl of 1977, and 2002.
- This was the first of six consecutive Grey Cup appearances for the Eskimos, who would go on to win the next five CFL championships.
- The 1977 game was the first Grey Cup played at the new Montreal Olympic Stadium.

== Box Score ==
Teams	1 Q	2 Q	3 Q	4 Q	Final
Montreal Alouettes	3	7	20	11	41
Edmonton Eskimos	0	3	3	0	6

First quarter

Montreal – FG – Don Sweet

Second quarter

Montreal - FG - Don Sweet
Montreal - FG - Don Sweet
Montreal - Single - Don Sweet missed FG

Edmonton – FG – Dave Cutler

Third quarter

Montreal – FG – Don Sweet
Edmonton – FG – Dave Cutler
Montreal – FG – Don Sweet
Montreal – TD – Peter Dalla Riva 7 yard pass from Sonny Wade (Don Sweet convert)
Montreal – TD – John O'Leary 10 yard pass from Sonny Wade (Don Sweet convert)

Fourth quarter

Montreal – TD – Bob Gaddis 7 yard pass from Sonny Wade (Don Sweet convert)
Montreal – Single – Montreal kick in End Zone
Montreal – FG – Don Sweet
