= Jimmy Jones (quarterback) =

American gridiron football player (born 1950)

Profile
- Position: Quarterback

Personal information
- Born: June 23, 1950 (age 76); Wilmington, Delaware, U.S.
- Listed height: 6 ft 1 in (1.85 m)
- Listed weight: 196 lb (89 kg)

Career information
- High school: John Harris (Harrisburg, Pennsylvania)
- College: USC
- NFL draft: 1972: undrafted

Career history
- 1973–1975: Montreal Alouettes
- 1976–1978: Hamilton Tiger-Cats
- 1979: Ottawa Rough Riders

Awards and highlights
- Grey Cup champion (1974); CFL East All-Star (1974)

Jimmy Jones (born June 23, 1950) is an American former all-star quarterback in the Canadian Football League (CFL). Jones was a graduate of the University of Southern California (USC). He moved to Canada in 1973, and played for the Montreal Alouettes, Hamilton Tiger-Cats and Ottawa Rough Riders, and helped lead the Alouettes to a Grey Cup win in 1974.

== Early life ==
Jones played football at John Harris High School in Harrisburg, Pennsylvania, where he became one of top rated quarterbacks in the nation.

He won the starter job during his junior year, passing and running for over 2,300 yards and 20 touchdowns, then 2,400 yards with 40 touchdowns in his senior year.

Jones was named to the first team All-American High School team in 1968 and had numerous scholarship offers.

He was such a dominant player at this level, that the school retired his number No. 10 jersey after his last game. John Harris High School was merged with William Penn High School in 1971, becoming Harrisburg High School.

== College career ==
Jones attended the University of Southern California and became one of the few African American starting quarterbacks of that era in Division I (NCAA), influencing during his college career the breaking of different color barriers.

As a sophomore in 1969, he helped lead USC to an undefeated season (10–0–1), a Rose Bowl win over the University of Michigan and a third-place ranking. During that season the team became known as the "Cardiac Kids", because of their last-minute comebacks. Jones was also the first African American quarterback to appear on a Sports Illustrated Cover (9/29/1969).

In 1970, he was part of USC's "all-black" backfield (the first one of its kind in Division I (NCAA) history), that included fullback Sam Cunningham and running back Clarence Davis. Jones was one of the five USC African American starters (along with Sam Cunningham, Clarence Davis, Charlie Weaver and Tody Smith), that played against an all-white University of Alabama football team, winning 42–21 in Birmingham on September 12, 1970. This game was historically significant, because it played a key role in convincing the University of Alabama and its fan base to accelerate the integration of its football team.

For his career he compiled a 22–8–3 record and established school marks at:

- Career passing attempts (602)
- Career passes completed (382)
- Career passing yards (4,902)
- Career rushing attempts (842)
- Career touchdown passes and rushing (42)
- Passing yards in a season (1,877)
- Touchdown passes in a season (13)
- Most passes attempted in a season
- Total yards in a season (1,936)
- Most passes attempted in a game (36)
- Most passes completed in a game (21)

== CFL career ==
=== Montreal Alouettes ===
In the spring of 1972 he went undrafted after not receiving much interest from NFL teams as a quarterback. After a year out of football, in 1973 he signed to play in the Canadian Football League for the Montreal Alouettes.

In 1974 he helped his team win the 1974 Grey Cup and was named an East All-Star. This would become his finest season with 2297 yards passing, 18 touchdown passes, 577 yards rushing and 5 TDs. He was selected as the Eastern All-Star at quarterback.

In 1975 the Alouettes once again reached the 1975 Grey Cup, but this time they lost to the Edmonton Eskimos. Unfortunately, on a bitterly cold day Jones mishandled the snap on a last second Don Sweet field goal and the Als lost the game by one point.

=== Hamilton Tiger-Cats ===
Jones signed with the Hamilton Tiger-Cats for the 1976 season, and played 3 years there.

=== Ottawa Rough Riders ===
In 1979, he signed with the Ottawa Rough Riders. Jones spent his final season as a back-up to Condredge Holloway, seeing limited playing time.

== Career regular season statistics ==
CFL statistics			Passing						Rushing				
Year	Team	GP	Att	Com	%	Yds	TD	Int	#	Yds	Ave.	Lg	TD
1973	Montreal Alouettes	14	117	72	61.5	912	6	5	43	269	6.3	31	4
1974	Montreal Alouettes	16	311	163	52.4	2297	18	22	90	577	6.4	25	5
1975	Montreal Alouettes	16	233	120	51.5	1865	10	11	59	301	5.1	32	1
1976	Hamilton Tiger-Cats	14	290	144	49.7	1773	12	9	44	96	2.2	16	1
1977	Hamilton Tiger-Cats	16	302	174	57.6	2156	9	14	58	342	5.9	39	5
1978	Hamilton Tiger-Cats	16	269	159	59.1	2060	9	11	43	204	4.7	28	1
1979	Ottawa Rough Riders	16	199	118	59.3	1342	8	12	27	112	4.1	19	1
	Totals		1721	950	55.2	12405	72	84	364	1901	5.2	39	18
