= Henoc Muamba =

Congolese-Canadian gridiron football player (born 1989)

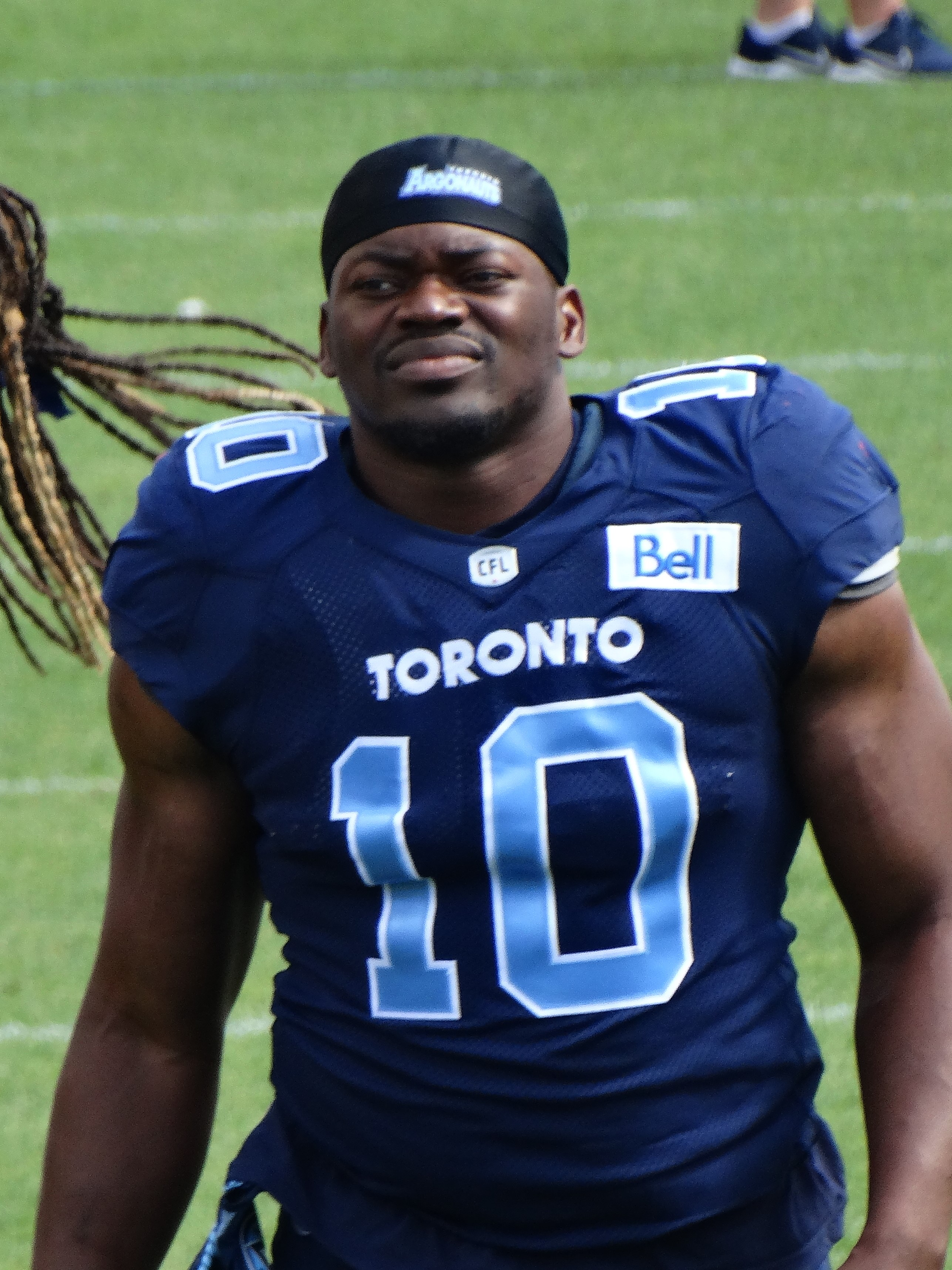
- Muamba with the Toronto Argonauts in 2022

No. 10, 51
- Position: Linebacker

Personal information
- Born: February 23, 1989 (age 37); Kinshasa, Zaire
- Listed height: 6 ft 0 in (1.83 m)
- Listed weight: 230 lb (104 kg)

Career information
- High school: Father Michael Goetz Secondary School (Mississauga, Ontario, Canada)
- University: St. Francis Xavier
- CFL draft: 2011: 1st round, 1st overall pick

Career history
- Winnipeg Blue Bombers (2011–2013); Indianapolis Colts (2014–2015); Montreal Alouettes (2015); Dallas Cowboys (2016)*; Saskatchewan Roughriders (2016–2017); Montreal Alouettes (2018–2020); Toronto Argonauts (2021–2023)
- * Offseason or practice squad member only

Awards and highlights
- Grey Cup champion (2022); Grey Cup Most Valuable Player (2022); Grey Cup Most Valuable Canadian (2022); CFL Most Outstanding Canadian (2017); 2× Lew Hayman Trophy (2013, 2019); 2× CFL All-Star (2013, 2019); 3× CFL East All-Star (2013, 2018, 2019); Presidents' Trophy (2010); 2× First-team CIS All-Canadian (2008, 2010); Second-team CIS All-Canadian (2009)

Career NFL statistics
- Games played: 13
- Total tackles: 6
- Stats at Pro Football Reference

Career CFL statistics
- Games played: 135
- Total tackles: 592
- Sacks: 17.0
- Forced fumbles: 14
- Interceptions: 8
- Stats at CFL.ca

Henoc Muamba (born February 23, 1989) is a Congolese-Canadian former professional football linebacker who played in the Canadian Football League (CFL) and National Football League (NFL). He was a two-time CFL All-Star, three-time CFL Divisional All-Star, and was named the CFL's Most Outstanding Canadian in 2017. In 2022, he won the Grey Cup with the Toronto Argonauts and was named the game's most valuable player (MVP) and Grey Cup Most Valuable Canadian, becoming the second player in history to earn both awards. He was also a member of the Winnipeg Blue Bombers, Indianapolis Colts, Montreal Alouettes, Dallas Cowboys, and Saskatchewan Roughriders.

He was selected first overall by the Blue Bombers in the 2011 CFL draft, becoming the first player from the St. Francis Xavier X-Men to be chosen first overall in the draft.

== Professional career ==
=== Winnipeg Blue Bombers ===
In the Canadian Football League’s Amateur Scouting Bureau final rankings, he was ranked as the third-best player for players eligible in the 2011 CFL draft, and first by players in Canadian Interuniversity Sport. On May 6, 2011, a Winnipeg Blue Bombers source leaked the Blue Bombers' intentions to select Muamba with the first overall pick in the 2011 CFL draft. To no surprise, Muamba was indeed selected first overall by Winnipeg in the draft and was signed to his first professional contract on May 30, 2011.

He played in his first professional game on August 26, 2011, against the Hamilton Tiger-Cats. He played mostly on special teams in his first year in the league and scored his first touchdown on a blocked punt return which he brought back 52 yards for the score on September 30, 2011, against the Montreal Alouettes. Muamba played in 11 regular season games in 2011 where he totalled 15 special teams tackles, one forced fumble, and one touchdown. He played in both post-season games, including his first Grey Cup appearance in the 2011 championship game, but the Blue Bombers lost to the BC Lions.

Muamba became a very significant part of the Bombers defence in 2012 as he recorded 65 tackles and three sacks while adding another 20 tackles on special teams. Muamba built upon the strong 2012 season he had with an even better 2013 season. He set a new career high with 106 defensive tackles (second most in the league), while also adding one quarterback sack and one interception. His outstanding 2013 campaign was recognized by the Blue Bombers as he was unanimously voted as the team's Most Outstanding Player, Most Outstanding Defensive Player and Most Outstanding Canadian. He won the Lew Hayman Trophy as the East Division's Most Outstanding Canadian. On February 5, 2014, Muamba was released by the Blue Bombers to pursue an NFL contract.

=== Indianapolis Colts ===
On February 6, 2014, Muamba signed with the Indianapolis Colts of the National Football League. He played in 13 regular season games with the Colts and recorded three solo tackles and two assisted tackles. He was waived on September 5, 2015.

=== Montreal Alouettes (first stint) ===
On September 30, 2015, Muamba signed with the Montreal Alouettes nearing the end of the 2015 CFL season. Muamba played in four games for the Alouettes, contributing 14 tackles and one interception. On February 16, 2016, Muamba was released by the Alouettes to once again pursue his NFL interest.

=== Dallas Cowboys ===
Muamba signed with the Dallas Cowboys of the NFL on July 30, 2016. He was released by the Cowboys on the final 53-man cut down day September 2, 2016.

=== Saskatchewan Roughriders ===
On October 5, 2016, Muamba and the Saskatchewan Roughriders agreed to terms on a contract bringing him back to the CFL for the third time. In a partial season with the Riders, Muamba contributed 18 tackles on defence, nine on specials teams, with two sacks and two forced fumbles. In his second season in Saskatchewan, Muamba played in 17 regular season games, amassing 82 defensive tackles, 11 tackles on special teams, three forced fumbles and two interceptions. Muamba was released by the Riders at the start of free agency, to avoid paying him an offseason bonus of $35,000 Canadian.

=== Montreal Alouettes (second stint) ===
On April 12, 2018, Muamba agreed to a three-year contract with the Alouettes with whom he had played during the 2015 CFL season. Muamba earned a career high in tackles with 108, a career high in sacks with five, as well as one interception and one forced fumble. This standout season earned Muamba award nominations by the Alouettes for the CFL's Most Outstanding Player, Defensive Player, and Canadian Player. Muamba was also named to the CFL-East All-Star team.

Muamba had another strong season in 2019 as he played in 17 regular season games and recorded 93 defensive tackles, one sack, and two forced fumbles. He again received the team nomination for Most Outstanding Canadian and this time won the league award for the first time in his career. He was also named a CFL All-Star for the second time in his career for the 2019 season. The Alouettes also returned to the playoffs in 2019 after a four-year absence and Muamba played in two post-season games where he recorded a total of 15 defensive tackles.

=== Toronto Argonauts ===
On March 16, 2021, Muamba signed with the Toronto Argonauts. In his first season in Toronto Muamba played in 10 games contributing with 49 tackles, two quarterbacks sacks and one interception. He re-signed with the Argos on January 25, 2022. In his second season with the Argos Muamba played in 17 regular season games and recorded 75 defensive tackles, three quarterback sacks, two interceptions and one tackle on special teams. He won the 109th Grey Cup against the Winnipeg Blue Bombers, winning both the Grey Cup MVP and Most Valuable Canadian in the process.

Following the 2022 season, in late January 2023, Muamba revealed he was considering retirement after 11 seasons of professional football. With his playing future uncertain he became a free agent on February 14, 2023. In the days following the start of free agency the Argos head coach Ryan Dinwiddie said the team was in correspondence with Muamba about his future. However, it was announced on February 21, 2023, that he had re-signed with the Argonauts. Muamba missed the entire 2023 season due to injury. He became a free agent upon the expiry of his contract on February 13, 2024. He retired on February 26, 2024.

== Personal life ==
Muamba was born in Kinshasa, Zaire (now Democratic Republic of the Congo), but grew up in Mississauga, Ontario. He played university football for St. Francis Xavier University in Antigonish, Nova Scotia, and is the school's all-time leader in tackles, with 149.5. His brother, Cauchy Muamba, is a defensive back who also plays professionally and played with Henoc and the Alouettes in 2019. In 2023, he was nominated and was one of the recipients of the 2023 Top 25 Canadian Immigrant Awards.
