= Eletise Fiatoa =

American gridiron football player (1954–2017)

Profile
- Position: Defensive tackle

Personal information
- Born: July 31, 1954; Oʻahu, Hawaii, US
- Died: May 27, 2017 (aged 62)
- Listed height: 5 ft 11 in (1.80 m)
- Listed weight: 244 lb (111 kg)

Career information
- College: Long Beach State

Career history
- 1978: Montreal Alouettes

Eletise Fiatoa (born July 31, 1954 – May 27, 2017) was an American gridiron football defensive tackle who played in the Canadian Football League.

Fiatoa was born on Oʻahu, Hawaii. Fiatoa played his college football at California State University, Long Beach, where he was a defensive tackle. He was recruited for the Montreal Alouettes by defensive end Junior Ah You. He played 6 games for the Alouettes in 1978.
