= 62nd Grey Cup =

1974 Canadian Football championship game

Montreal Alouettes	Edmonton Eskimos
(9–5–2)	(10–5–1)
20	7
Head coach: Marv Levy	Head coach: Ray Jauch
	1	2	3	4	Total
Montreal Alouettes	0	11	3	6	20
Edmonton Eskimos	7	0	0	0	7
- Date: November 24, 1974
- Stadium: Empire Stadium
- Location: Vancouver
- Most Valuable Player: Offence: Sonny Wade, QB (Alouettes); Defence: Junior Ah You, DE (Alouettes)
- Most Valuable Canadian: Don Sweet, K (Alouettes)
- National anthem: The Maple Leaf Choir
- Referee: Don Barker
- Attendance: 34,450

Broadcasters
- Network: CBC, CTV, SRC

The 62nd Grey Cup was played on November 24, 1974 before 34,450 fans at Empire Stadium in Vancouver. The Montreal Alouettes beat the Edmonton Eskimos 20–7 on a slick, wet field. Many balls were fumbled and passes dropped on a rainy Vancouver day.

== Box Score ==
First quarter

Edmonton – TD – Calvin Harrell 8 yard pass from Tom Wilkinson (Dave Cutler convert)

Second quarter

Montreal - Single – Don Sweet 50 yard missed field goal
Montreal - TD - Larry Sherrer 5 yard run (Don Sweet convert)
Montreal - FG - Don Sweet 18 yards

Third quarter

Montreal - FG - Don Sweet 27 yards

Fourth quarter

Montreal - FG - Don Sweet 27 yards
Montreal - FG - Don Sweet 25 yards

Teams	1 Q	2 Q	3 Q	4 Q	Final
Montreal Alouettes	0	11	3	6	20
Edmonton Eskimos	7	0	0	0	7

== Trivia ==
Both starting quarterbacks ended up leaving the game. The CFL's Most Outstanding Player Award winner Tom Wilkinson was injured when sacked by Junior Ah You and was replaced by Bruce Lemmerman. Sonny Wade came off the Alouettes' bench to replace starting quarterback Jimmy Jones. In his Grey Cup career, Wade frequently came on in relief; he also did so in 1975 and 1978.

Sonny Wade won his second Grey Cup Most Valuable Player award (offence) while completing only 10 of 25 passes for 139 yards. Junior Ah You won the award on defence. This was the first year two separate Most Valuable Player awards were given out, one on offence, one on defence; this would be the case until 1990.

Edmonton and Montreal have met in 11 Grey Cup clashes. The Eskimos prevailed in 1954, 1955, 1956, 1975, 1978, 1979, 2003 and 2005's overtime thriller. The Alouettes were victorious in 1974, the Ice Bowl of 1977, and 2002.

This was the last Grey Cup game played at Empire Stadium; the next time Vancouver hosted a Grey Cup game nine years later in 1983, it would be indoors at the new BC Place Stadium.
