= Grey Cup Most Valuable Player =

Annual Canadian football award

- Awarded for: Most valuable player of the Grey Cup

History
- First award: 1959
- Most wins: Sonny Wade (3); Damon Allen (3); Doug Flutie (3)
- Most recent: Cody Fajardo

The Grey Cup's Most Valuable Player (MVP) award is presented annually to the most valuable player of the Grey Cup, the Canadian Football League's (CFL) championship game.This award is presented before the Grey Cup trophy is presented.

Canadians are eligible for the award but have seldom hoisted it due to American players' dominance in the league. Andrew Harris, after winning the Grey Cup with the Winnipeg Blue Bombers in 2019, became the first player to win both the Grey Cup Most Valuable Player and the Dick Suderman Trophy (Grey Cup Most Valuable Canadian) in the same edition of the championship (later repeated by Henoc Muamba in 2022).

From 1974 to 1990, Offensive Player of the Game and Defensive Player of the Game were awarded. Sonny Wade, Damon Allen, and Doug Flutie are tied for the most Grey Cup MVPs with three (although two of Wade's MVPs were during the Offensive Player of the Game era).

== Grey Cup Most Valuable Player award winners ==
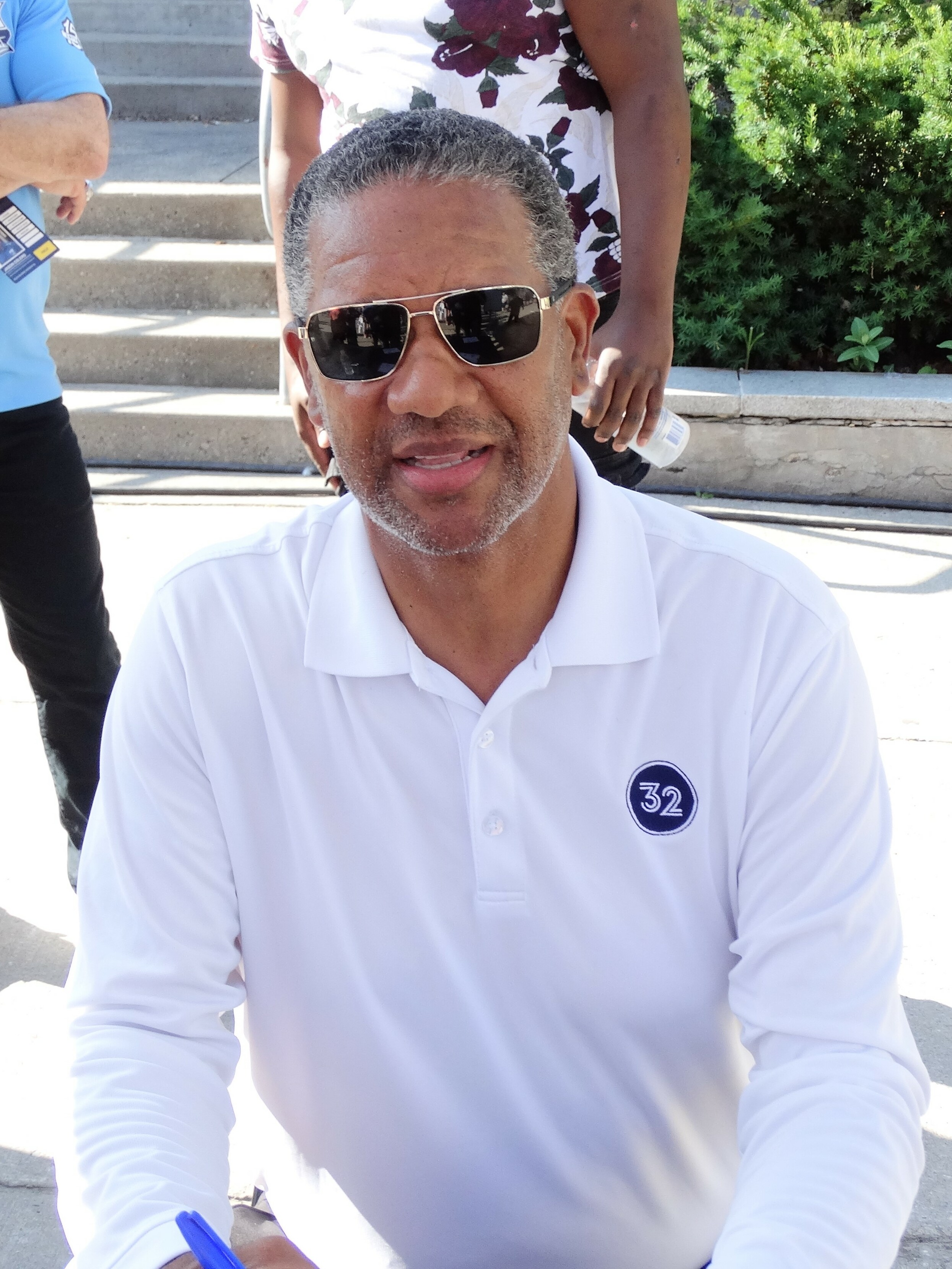
Damon Allen was the Grey Cup MVP in 1987, 1993, and 2004

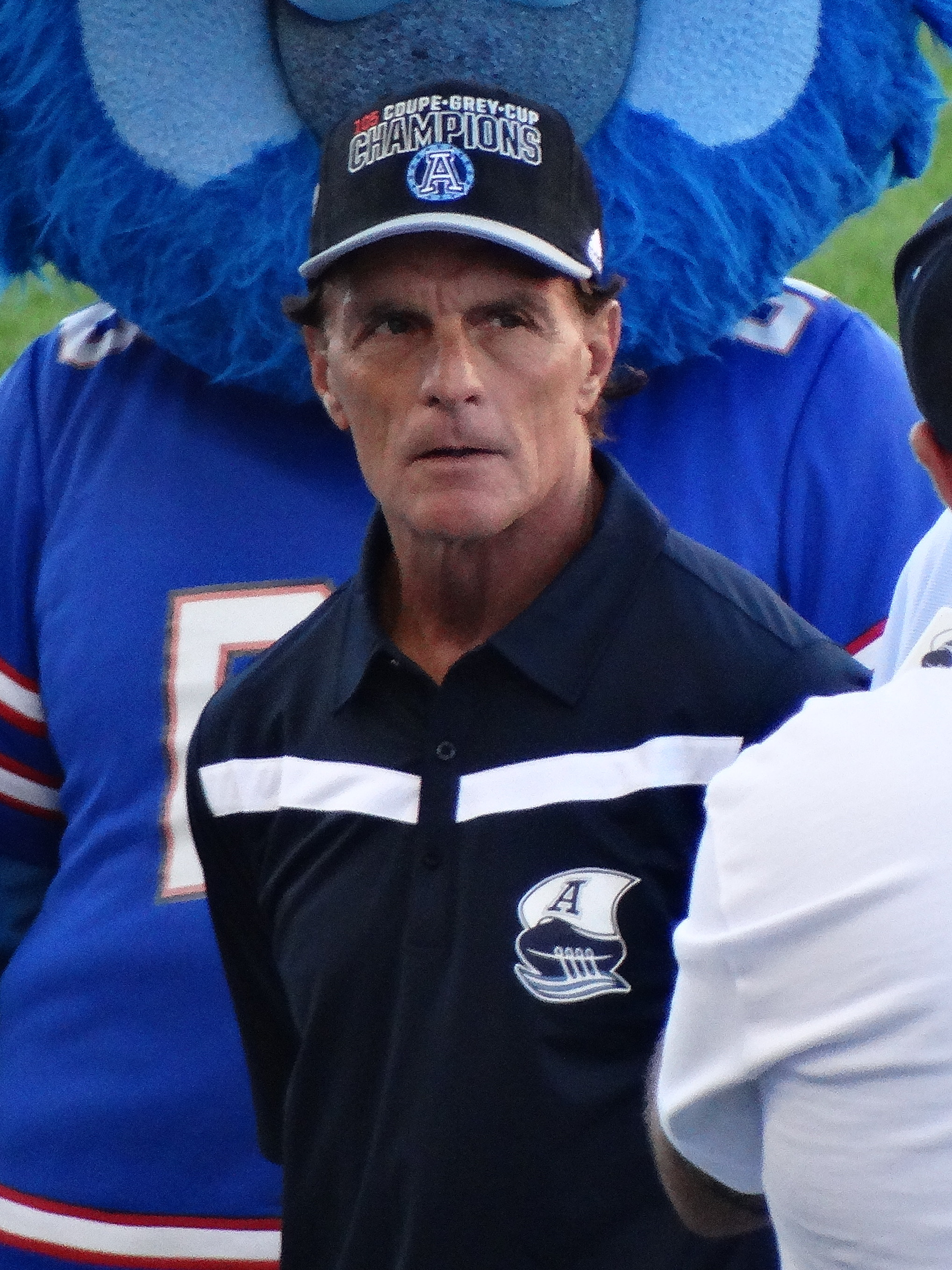
Doug Flutie was the Grey Cup MVP in 1992, 1996, and 1997

Key for the below tables
Symbol	Description
†	Player still active in CFL
*	Player elected to the Canadian Football Hall of Fame
§	Player's team lost the Grey Cup

Year	Player	Position	Team
1959	Charlie Shepard	RB	Winnipeg Blue Bombers
1960	Ron Stewart*	RB	Ottawa Rough Riders
1961	Ken Ploen*	QB	Winnipeg Blue Bombers
1962	Leo Lewis*	RB	Winnipeg Blue Bombers
1963	Not awarded		
1964	Not awarded		
1965	Not awarded		
1966	Not awarded		
1967	Joe Zuger	QB	Hamilton Tiger-Cats
1968	Vic Washington	RB	Ottawa Rough Riders
1969	Russ Jackson*	QB	Ottawa Rough Riders
1970	Sonny Wade	QB	Montreal Alouettes
1971	Wayne Harris*	LB	Calgary Stampeders
1972	Chuck Ealey	QB	Hamilton Tiger-Cats
1973	Charlie Brandon	DE	Ottawa Rough Riders
From 1974 to 1990, Offensive Player of the Game and Defensive Player of the Game were awarded
1974	Offence: Sonny Wade	QB	Montreal Alouettes
1974	Defence: Junior Ah You*	DE	Montreal Alouettes
1975	Offence: Steve Ferrughelli	RB	Montreal Alouettes§
1975	Defence: Lewis Cook	DB	Montreal Alouettes§
1976	Offence: Tom Clements*	QB	Ottawa Rough Riders
1976	Defence: Cleveland Vann	LB	Saskatchewan Roughriders§
1977	Offence: Sonny Wade	QB	Montreal Alouettes
1977	Defence: Glen Weir*	DT	Montreal Alouettes
1978	Offence: Tom Wilkinson*	QB	Edmonton Eskimos
1978	Defence: Dave "Dr. Death" Fennell*	DT	Edmonton Eskimos
1979	Offence: David Green	RB	Montreal Alouettes§
1979	Defence: Tom Cousineau	LB	Montreal Alouettes§
1980	Offence: Warren Moon*	QB	Edmonton Eskimos
1980	Defence: Dale Potter	LB	Edmonton Eskimos
1981	Offence: J.C. Watts	QB	Ottawa Rough Riders§
1981	Defence: John Glassford	LB	Ottawa Rough Riders§
1982	Offence: Warren Moon*	QB	Edmonton Eskimos
1982	Defence: Dave "Dr. Death" Fennell*	DT	Edmonton Eskimos
1983	Offence: Joe Barnes	QB	Toronto Argonauts
1983	Defence: Carl Brazley	DB	Toronto Argonauts
1984	Offence: Tom Clements*	QB	Winnipeg Blue Bombers
1984	Defence: Tyrone Jones*	LB	Winnipeg Blue Bombers
1985	Offence: Roy Dewalt	QB	BC Lions
1985	Defence: James "Quick" Parker*	DE	BC Lions
1986	Offence: Mike Kerrigan	QB	Hamilton Tiger-Cats
1986	Defence: Grover Covington*	DE	Hamilton Tiger-Cats
1987	Offence: Damon Allen*	QB	Edmonton Eskimos
1987	Defence: Stewart Hill	DE	Edmonton Eskimos
1988	Offence: James Murphy*	WR	Winnipeg Blue Bombers
1988	Defence: Michael Gray	DT	Winnipeg Blue Bombers
1989	Offence: Kent Austin	QB	Saskatchewan Roughriders
1989	Defence: Chuck Klingbeil	DT	Saskatchewan Roughriders
1990	Offence: Tom Burgess	QB	Winnipeg Blue Bombers
1990	Defence: Greg Battle*	LB	Winnipeg Blue Bombers
From 1974 to 1990, Offensive Player of the Game and Defensive Player of the Game were awarded
1991	Raghib "Rocket" Ismail	WR	Toronto Argonauts
1992	Doug Flutie*	QB	Calgary Stampeders
1993	Damon Allen*	QB	Edmonton Eskimos
1994	Karl Anthony	DB	Baltimore F.C.§
1995	Tracy Ham*	QB	Baltimore Stallions
1996	Doug Flutie*	QB	Toronto Argonauts
1997	Doug Flutie*	QB	Toronto Argonauts
1998	Jeff Garcia	QB	Calgary Stampeders
1999	Danny McManus*	QB	Hamilton Tiger-Cats
2000	Robert Drummond	RB	BC Lions
2001	Marcus Crandell	QB	Calgary Stampeders
2002	Anthony Calvillo*	QB	Montreal Alouettes
2003	Jason Tucker	WR	Edmonton Eskimos
2004	Damon Allen*	QB	Toronto Argonauts
2005	Ricky Ray*	QB	Edmonton Eskimos
2006	Dave Dickenson*	QB	BC Lions
2007	James Johnson	DB	Saskatchewan Roughriders
2008	Henry Burris*	QB	Calgary Stampeders
2009	Avon Cobourne	RB	Montreal Alouettes
2010	Jamel Richardson	SB	Montreal Alouettes
2011	Travis Lulay	QB	BC Lions
2012	Chad Kackert	RB	Toronto Argonauts
2013	Kory Sheets	RB	Saskatchewan Roughriders
2014	Bo Levi Mitchell†	QB	Calgary Stampeders
2015	Mike Reilly	QB	Edmonton Eskimos
2016	Henry Burris*	QB	Ottawa Redblacks
2017	DeVier Posey	WR	Toronto Argonauts
2018	Bo Levi Mitchell †	QB	Calgary Stampeders
2019	Andrew Harris	RB	Winnipeg Blue Bombers
2020	Game cancelled due to COVID-19 pandemic in Canada		
2021	Zach Collaros†	QB	Winnipeg Blue Bombers
2022	Hénoc Muamba	LB	Toronto Argonauts
2023	Cody Fajardo†	QB	Montreal Alouettes
2024	Nick Arbuckle†	QB	Toronto Argonauts
2025	Trevor Harris†	QB	Saskatchewan Roughriders
2026	Cody Fajardo†	QB	Edmonton Elks

=== Multiple winners ===
Player	Position	Team	Wins	Years
Sonny Wade	Quarterback	Montreal Alouettes	3	1970, 1974, 1977
Damon Allen*	Quarterback	Edmonton Eskimos (2) / Toronto Argonauts (1)	3	1987, 1993, 2004
Doug Flutie*	Quarterback	Toronto Argonauts (2) / Calgary Stampeders (1)	3	1992, 1996, 1997
Tom Clements*	Quarterback	Ottawa Rough Riders (1) / Winnipeg Blue Bombers (1)	2	1976, 1984
Dave Fennell*	Defensive tackle	Edmonton Eskimos	2	1978, 1982
Warren Moon*	Quarterback	Edmonton Eskimos	2	1980, 1982
Henry Burris*	Quarterback	Calgary Stampeders (1) / Ottawa Redblacks (1)	2	2008, 2016
Bo Levi Mitchell†	Quarterback	Calgary Stampeders	2	2014, 2018
Cody Fajardo†	Quarterback	Montreal Alouettes (1) / Edmonton Elks (1)	2	2023, 2026

== See also ==
- Grey Cup Most Valuable Canadian
