= Larry Sherrer =

American gridiron football player (1950–2024)

Profile
- Position: Running back

Personal information
- Born: January 1, 1950
- Died: January 2, 2024 (aged 74); Kauai, Hawaii, U.S.
- Listed height: 6 ft 2 in (1.88 m)
- Listed weight: 205 lb (93 kg)

Career information
- College: Hawaii

Career history
- 1973–1975: Montreal Alouettes
- 1976: BC Lions

Awards and highlights
- Grey Cup champion (1974)

Larry Sherrer (January 1, 1950 – January 2, 2024) was an American professional football running back who played two seasons in the Canadian Football League (CFL) with the Montreal Alouettes and BC Lions. He first enrolled at the University of Oklahoma before transferring to the University of Hawaii at Manoa.

== College career ==
Sherrer first played college football for the Oklahoma Sooners of the University of Oklahoma.

Sherrer transferred to play for the Hawaii Rainbow Warriors of the University of Hawaii at Manoa from 1969 to 1971. He played in the Hula Bowl in 1971 and was an honorable mention small school All-American. He became the first player in the school's history to rush for more than 1,000 yards in a season, finished his career as the Rainbow Warriors' career leader in rushing and scoring. Sherrer also participated in track and field for the Rainbow Warriors. He was inducted into the University of Hawai‘i Sports Circle of Honor.

== Professional career ==
Sherrer signed with the Montreal Alouettes in 1973 but suffered an injury that caused him to miss the 1973 season. He played in three games for the Alouettes in 1974 and scored the team's only touchdown of the 1974 Grey Cup as the Alouettes beat the Edmonton Eskimos 20-7. He missed the entire 1975 season due to a severe pelvic injury.

Sherrer played for the BC Lions in 1976.

== Later life and death ==
After 1990, Sherrer practiced as an ophthalmologist in Kauai, Hawaii. He died on January 2, 2024, at the age of 74.
