= 61st Grey Cup =

1973 Canadian Football championship game

Ottawa Rough Riders	Edmonton Eskimos
(9–5)	(9–5–2)
22	18
Head coach: Jack Gotta	Head coach: Ray Jauch
	1	2	3	4	Total
Ottawa Rough Riders	7	5	7	3	22
Edmonton Eskimos	10	0	0	8	18
- Date: November 25, 1973
- Stadium: CNE Stadium
- Location: Toronto
- Most Valuable Player: Charlie Brandon, DE (Rough Riders)
- Most Valuable Canadian: Garry Lefebvre, DB/WR/P (Eskimos)
- National anthem: Gordon James
- Referee: Harry Ross
- Attendance: 36,653

Broadcasters
- Network: CBC, CTV, SRC

The 61st Grey Cup game was played at Toronto's CNE Stadium on November 25, 1973. The Ottawa Rough Riders defeated the Edmonton Eskimos 22–18, before a crowd of 36,653.

== Game summary ==
Edmonton scored quickly in the first quarter when running back Roy Bell found a big hole in the left side for a 38-yard touchdown run. Rick Cassata, the Riders' backup quarterback who was replacing injured Jerry Keeling responded with a 38-yard touchdown pass-and-run to Rhome Nixon. Late in the quarter, however, Tom Wilkinson was knocked out of bounds by Ottawa's Wayne Smith and suffered a rib injury. He was replaced by backup Bruce Lemmerman. Lemmerman took the Eskimos close enough for Dave Cutler to kick a field goal, giving them a 10-7 lead at the end of the first quarter.

A low snap to Edmonton punter Garry Lefebvre caused him to bobble the ball in the end zone, and he was tackled for a safety by Ottawa's Wayne Tosh at 21 seconds of the second quarter. Gerry Organ kicked a 46-yard field goal in the last minute of the half. The half-time score was 12-10 for Ottawa.

Ottawa increased its lead with an 18-yard touchdown run by Jim Evenson at 9:45 of the third quarter.

In the fourth quarter, Lemmerman suffered an arm injury, and Wilkinson, his rib injury frozen, came off the bench to bring some life to the Eskimo offence. Edmonton receiver Tyrone Walls fumbled after receiving a Wilkinson pass on Edmonton's 47. Wayne Tosh recovered and Organ kicked another Ottawa field goal from the 39.

Edmonton then scored a single and Lefebvre, who played both ways as well as being the punter, caught a Wilkinson touchdown pass with seven seconds left, but it was not enough to erase Ottawa's 12 point lead.

== Most Valuable Players ==
Ottawa Defensive End Charlie Brandon was named Most Valuable Player and Garry Lefebvre was named Most Valuable Canadian.

== Trivia ==
This would be the first of a string of nine Grey Cup appearances for the Edmonton Eskimos from 1973 to 1982. The only year they missed the Grey Cup during that span was 1976, when the Saskatchewan Roughriders defeated them in the West Final. Edmonton was victorious in six of their nine appearances (1975, and five straight from 1978–82).

This was the last Grey Cup game played at CNE Stadium prior to its renovations in the mid-1970s in anticipation of receiving a Major League Baseball team in Toronto; it would come in the form of the Blue Jays in 1977. By the next Grey Cup game played at the stadium in 1976, the renovation and expansion had been completed.
