= Ian Sunter =

Canadian gridiron football player (born 1952)

No. 36, 9
- Position: Kicker

Personal information
- Born: December 21, 1952 (age 73); Dundee, Scotland

Career information
- College: None

Career history
- 1972–1975: Hamilton Tiger-Cats
- 1976: Detroit Lions
- 1977–1979: Toronto Argonauts
- 1980: Cincinnati Bengals

Awards and highlights
- Grey Cup champion (1972); Dick Suderman Trophy (1972)
- Stats at Pro Football Reference

Ian Sunter (born December 21, 1952) is a Scottish-Canadian Canadian football place kicker who also played two seasons in the NFL (1976 and 1980).
