= Sean Kehoe =

Canadian football player (born 1958)

Profile
- Position: Running back

Personal information
- Born: April 28, 1958 (age 68); Edmonton, Alberta, Canada
- Listed height: 6 ft 0 in (1.83 m)
- Listed weight: 180 lb (82 kg)

Career information
- College: University of Alberta

Career history
- 1981–1982: Edmonton Eskimos
- 1983–1986: Winnipeg Blue Bombers

Awards and highlights
- 3× Grey Cup champion (1981, 1982, 1984); Dick Suderman Trophy (1984)

Sean Kehoe (born April 28, 1958) is a former Canadian Football League (CFL) fullback.

Kehoe joined his hometown Edmonton Eskimos in 1981 and was part of the last two Grey Cup victories of that great dynasty. He moved to the Winnipeg Blue Bombers in 1983. In 1984 he won the Grey Cup again and was named the Dick Suderman Trophy winner (rushing for 89 yards.) His two best seasons were 1985, when he caught 54 passes for 513 yards, and 1986 when he snagged another 45 for 440 yards. Over six seasons he rushed for 571 yards, caught 156 passes for 1,482 yards, and scored eight touchdowns.
