= Lewis Cook (Canadian football) =

American gridiron football player (born 1946)

Profile
- Position: Defensive back

Personal information
- Born: December 5, 1946 (age 79); Tucson, Arizona, U.S.
- Listed height: 5 ft 11 in (1.80 m)
- Listed weight: 180 lb (82 kg)

Career information
- High school: Tucson (AZ)
- College: Arizona Western Junior College; University of Idaho

Career history
- 1970: Montreal Alouettes
- 1972–73: Saskatchewan Roughriders
- 1974: Detroit Wheels
- 1975: Montreal Alouettes
- 1976: Hamilton Tiger-Cats
- 1977: Saskatchewan Roughriders
- 1977: Montreal Alouettes
- 1977: Toronto Argonauts

Awards and highlights
- Grey Cup champion (1975); Grey Cup Most Valuable Player (1975)

Lewis E. Cook (born December 5, 1946) is a former award-winning defensive back in the Canadian Football League.

A graduate of University of Idaho, Cook came to Canada to play professional football, having a well traveled career. He began with the Montreal Alouettes, playing 3 games in 1970 (and 21 total regular season games for the Larks) He then moved to the Saskatchewan Roughriders in 1972 for 2 seasons, his best being his first when he intercepted 6 passes and returned one for a touchdown. He then played one season in the short lived World Football League with the Detroit Wheels. He again played for the Montreal Alouettes in 1975, returning a punt 98 yards for a TD and winning the Grey Cup Most Valuable Player award in a losing cause against the Edmonton Eskimos. He played 1976 with the Hamilton Tiger-Cats, rejoined the Saskatchewan Roughriders in 1977, but was traded to the Als yet again, and finished his career with 2 games for the Toronto Argonauts. He had 14 interceptions during his career.
