= Angelo Santucci =

Canadian football player (born 1951)

No. 23
- Position: Running back

Personal information
- Born: February 5, 1951 (age 75); Hamilton, Ontario, Canada

Career information
- College: St. Mary's

Career history
- 1975–1976: Hamilton Tiger-Cats
- 1977–1983: Edmonton Eskimos
- 1984: Ottawa Rough Riders

Awards and highlights
- 5× Grey Cup champion (1978–1982); Dick Suderman Trophy (1978)

Angelo Santucci (born February 5, 1951) is a Canadian former professional football running back for the Hamilton Tiger-Cats, Edmonton Eskimos and Ottawa Rough Riders from 1975 to 1984.

Santucci played university football for the St. Mary's Huskies starting in 1971.

Some of his career highlights include being the Most Outstanding Rookie nominee in 1975 for the Hamilton Tiger-Cats, and winning five Grey Cup Championships with Edmonton Eskimos from 1978 to 1982. In the 1978 Grey Cup game, Santucci was selected as the Outstanding Canadian being awarded with the Dick Suderman Trophy.
