= Steve Ferrughelli =

American gridiron football player (1949–2016)

Profile
- Position: Fullback

Personal information
- Born: March 12, 1949; Newark, New Jersey, U.S.
- Died: June 25, 2016 (aged 67); Rigaud, Quebec, Canada
- Listed height: 6 ft 2 in (1.88 m)
- Listed weight: 235 lb (107 kg)

Career information
- College: Rutgers

Career history
- 1973–1976: Montreal Alouettes
- 1976: Edmonton Eskimos

Awards and highlights
- Grey Cup champion (1974); Grey Cup Most Valuable Player (1975); CFL East All-Star (1974)

Stephen Ferrughelli (March 12, 1949 – June 25, 2016) was an American professional football player who was a fullback in the Canadian Football League (CFL).

A graduate of Rutgers University, Ferrughelli had overcome difficult childhood handicaps (speech and hearing impairments) to earn his education and football scholarship. Ferrughelli would have a brief stint in the NFL with the New Orleans Saints and Washington Redskins before a knee injury led to him being cut. He subsequently moved to the Canadian Football League. He joined Montreal in 1973 but made a huge impact the next season, rushing for 1124 yards, being named an all-star, and winning the Grey Cup. In 1975, he rushed for another 893 yards and was named Grey Cup Most Valuable Player in a one-point loss to the Edmonton Eskimos. Ferrughelli was caught in an import/Canadian ratio tangle in 1976, when Montreal needed a defensive back and were able to acquire a Canadian first stringer from Edmonton in exchange for him. He was traded to Edmonton, where he finished his career. He had played 43 regular season games for the Als (and 5 for the Esks) and had 2763 total rushing yards.

Ferughelli later worked in the home-renovation business in Montreal's West Island. He subsequently moved to Rigaud, where he died on June 25, 2016.
