= Garry Lefebvre =

Canadian gridiron football player (1944–2016)

No. 11
- Positions: Wide receiver, punter, defensive back

Personal information
- Born: November 12, 1944; Cold Lake, Alberta, Canada
- Died: March 16, 2016 (aged 71); St. Albert, Alberta, Canada
- Listed height: 6 ft 1 in (1.85 m)
- Listed weight: 185 lb (84 kg)

Career information
- CJFL: Edmonton Wildcats

Career history
- 1966–1969: Edmonton Eskimos
- 1969–1971: Montreal Alouettes
- 1972–1976: Edmonton Eskimos

Awards and highlights
- 2× Grey Cup champion (1970, 1975); Dr. Beattie Martin Trophy (1966); Dick Suderman Trophy (1973)

Garry Lefebvre (November 12, 1944 – March 16, 2016) was a Canadian Football League (CFL) player with the Edmonton Eskimos and Montreal Alouettes at the wide receiver and punter positions.

== Professional career ==
After being injured in high school, Lefebvre starred with the Edmonton Wildcats for three seasons before joining the Edmonton Eskimos in 1966. Playing 16 games and catching 9 passes for a 25.3 yards average and three touchdowns, he won the Dr. Beattie Martin Trophy as best rookie in the Western Conference. After two more season in Edmonton, Lefebvre was disappointed to learn he was traded to the last place Montreal Alouettes. His short 1970 season was redeemed by a Grey Cup victory, in which he caught the final touchdown. Returning to the Eskimos, he was the Dick Suderman Trophy winner for best Canadian in a Grey Cup loss to the Ottawa Rough Riders in 1973. His best season was 1974, when he caught 36 passes for 575 yards and played in the Grey Cup, losing to Montreal. In 1975 he won his second Grey Cup ring, again against Montreal.

While mostly a receiver, Lefebvre was also a first string punter, punting 83 times in 1968, 102 times in 1973, 103 times in 1974, and 127 times in his final season. He could also play defensive back, intercepting seven passes and returning two for touchdowns (both in 1967.) He attempted two passes during his career, completing both.

== Career regular season statistics ==
CFL statistics			Receiving					Punting				Interceptions				
Year	Team	GP	Rec	Yards	Y/R	Lg	TD	Punts	Yds	Ave.	S	Int	Yds	Ave	Lg	TD
1966	Edmonton Eskimos	16	9	228	25.3	55	3	0	0	0	0	0	0	0	0	0
1967	Edmonton Eskimos	16	13	336	25.8	74	2	4	130	32.5	0	2	91	45.5	53	2
1968	Edmonton Eskimos	15	19	319	16.8	59	3	83	3239	39.0	2	0	0	0	0	0
1969	Edmonton & Montreal	13	18	357	19.8	58	1	24	873	36.4	0	0	0	0	0	0
1970	Montreal Alouettes	2	1	14	14.0	14	0	0	0	0	0	0	0	0	0	0
1971	Montreal Alouettes	9	20	294	14.7	43	1	30	1149	38.3	1	0	0	0	0	0
1972	Edmonton Eskimos	16	1	12	12.0	12	0	103	3984	38.7	0	4	30	7.5	28	0
1973	Edmonton Eskimos	16	18	335	18.6	43	4	102	4239	41.2	2	1	14	14.0	14	0
1974	Edmonton Eskimos	16	36	576	16.0	66	3	103	4211	40.9	1	0	0	0	0	0
1975	Edmonton Eskimos	1	2	93	46.5	83	1	4	153	38.3	0	0	0	0	0	0
1976	Edmonton Eskimos	16	16	293	18.3	48	3	127	5005	39.4	1	0	0	0	0	0
Total		136	153	2857	18.7	83	21	580	22983	39.6	7	7	134	19.2	53	2

== Personal ==
Lefebvre was married to Sandi and they have four children: Cheri, Brad, Julie and Jesse.

He was a founding member of Athletes in Action, which he joined in 1972.

Lefebvre built and directed Canada's first Circle Square youth ranch in Halkirk, Alberta, where he and his family served for eight years. After founding and pastoring a small church in Kelowna, BC in 1988, Garry returned to Edmonton in 1992 as director of the 100 Huntley Street counselling centre. On July 15, 1992, Lefebvre was a guest on 100 Huntley Street.

In 1995, he brought the ministry of Athletes International Ministries to Canada, where he is now executive director. In January 2009, he became the Regional Co-ordinator of Edmonton and area for Promise Keepers Canada.

On March 16, 2016, the Edmonton Eskimos announced on their website that Lefebvre died. No cause of death was given. He was 71.
