= Dick Suderman Trophy =

Canadian Football League award, created 1971

The Dick Suderman Trophy (French: Trophée Dick Suderman) for the Grey Cup's Most Valuable Canadian is awarded annually to the Canadian player deemed to have the best performance in the Grey Cup game, the championship of the Canadian Football League. This award is presented before the Grey Cup trophy is presented.

The winner does not necessarily have to play for the Grey Cup winning team in order to qualify.

The award was introduced at the 1971 Grey Cup, and the first winner was Dick Suderman, a Canadian defensive end. A year later, just six weeks before the playing of the 1972 Grey Cup, Suderman collapsed and died from a brain hemorrhage after playing a regular season game; the trophy was subsequently renamed in his honour.

== Player achievements ==
The most wins by a player is three, for both Don Sweet (completed in 1979) and Dave Sapunjis (completed in 1995). Four other players have won the award twice each.

Dave Sapunjis is the only player to win the award in consecutive (1991, 1992) Grey Cup games.

Garry Lefebvre is the only player to be awarded the trophy for his performance at three distinct positions, in three distinct aspects, during a single (1973) Grey Cup game: defensive back, part of the defense unit of the team; punter, part of the special teams unit of the team; and wide receiver, part of the offense unit of the team. Four other players (one a double winner) have been awarded the trophy for their performance in playing the two distinct, yet related, positions of punter and placekicker.

Andrew Harris and Hénoc Muamba are the only players to win both the Dick Suderman Trophy and the Grey Cup Most Valuable Player award in the same Grey Cup game.

== Dick Suderman Trophy winners ==
Year	Player	Position	Club	Notes
1971	Dick Suderman	DE	Calgary Stampeders	
1972	Ian Sunter	K	Hamilton Tiger-Cats	
1973	Garry Lefebvre	DB / P / WR	Edmonton Eskimos	on losing team
1974	Don Sweet	K	Montreal Alouettes	
1975	Dave Cutler	K	Edmonton Eskimos	
1976	Tony Gabriel	TE	Ottawa Rough Riders	
1977	Don Sweet	K	Montreal Alouettes	
1978	Angelo Santucci	RB	Edmonton Eskimos	
1979	Don Sweet	K	Montreal Alouettes	on losing team
1980	Dale Potter	LB	Edmonton Eskimos	
1981	Neil Lumsden	RB	Edmonton Eskimos	
1982	Dave "Dr. Death" Fennell	DT	Edmonton Eskimos	
1983	Rick Klassen	DT	BC Lions	on losing team
1984	Sean Kehoe	RB	Winnipeg Blue Bombers	
1985	Lui Passaglia	K / P	BC Lions	
1986	Paul Osbaldiston	K / P	Hamilton Tiger-Cats	
1987	Milson Jones	RB	Edmonton Eskimos	
1988	Bob Cameron	K / P	Winnipeg Blue Bombers	
1989	Dave Ridgway	K	Saskatchewan Roughriders	
1990	Warren Hudson	FB	Winnipeg Blue Bombers	
1991	Dave Sapunjis	SB	Calgary Stampeders	on losing team
1992	Dave Sapunjis	SB	Calgary Stampeders	
1993	Sean Fleming	K / P	Edmonton Eskimos	
1994	Lui Passaglia	K / P	BC Lions	
1995	Dave Sapunjis	S	Calgary Stampeders	on losing team
1996	Mike Vanderjagt	K	Toronto Argonauts	
1997	Paul Masotti	WR	Toronto Argonauts	
1998	Vince Danielsen	SB	Calgary Stampeders	
1999	Mike Morreale	SB	Hamilton Tiger-Cats	
2000	Sean Millington	RB	BC Lions	
2001	Aldi Henry	DB	Calgary Stampeders	
2002	Pat Woodcock	WR	Montreal Alouettes	
2003	Ben Cahoon	SB	Montreal Alouettes	on losing team
2004	Jason Clermont	SB	BC Lions	on losing team
2005	Maven Maurer (Note: Credited as Mike Maurer; The 93rd Grey Cup game was played before Maurer came out as transgender.)	FB	Edmonton Eskimos	
2006	Paul McCallum	K	BC Lions	
2007	Andy Fantuz	SB	Saskatchewan Roughriders	
2008	Sandro DeAngelis	K	Calgary Stampeders	
2009	Ben Cahoon	SB	Montreal Alouettes	
2010	Keith Shologan	DT	Saskatchewan Roughriders	on losing team
2011	Andrew Harris	RB	BC Lions	
2012	Ricky Foley	DE	Toronto Argonauts	
2013	Chris Getzlaf	SB	Saskatchewan Roughriders	
2014	Andy Fantuz	SB	Hamilton Tiger-Cats	on losing team
2015	Shamawd Chambers	WR	Edmonton Eskimos	
2016	Brad Sinopoli	WR	Ottawa Redblacks	
2017	Jerome Messam	RB	Calgary Stampeders	on losing team
2018	Lemar Durant	WR	Calgary Stampeders	
2019	Andrew Harris	RB	Winnipeg Blue Bombers	also Grey Cup MVP
2021	Nic Demski	WR	Winnipeg Blue Bombers	
2022	Hénoc Muamba	LB	Toronto Argonauts	also Grey Cup MVP
2023	Tyson Philpot	WR	Montreal Alouettes	
2024	Dejon Brissett	WR	Toronto Argonauts	
2025	Samuel Emilus	WR	Saskatchewan Roughriders	
2026	Tyson Philpot	WR	Montreal Alouettes	on losing team

== Team achievements ==
Teams represented by Dick Suderman Trophy winners through the years.

Club	# of Winners	Most recent
Edmonton Eskimos/Elks (Note: Edmonton Eskimos changed their name to Edmonton Elks as of the 2021 CFL season)	10	2015
Calgary Stampeders	9	2018
Montreal Alouettes (Note: Montreal Alouettes changed their name to Montreal Concordes during a four season (1982–1985) naming dispute; the club did not reach the Grey Cup during those years, and records its own history as all Alouettes)	8	2026
BC Lions	7	2011
Saskatchewan Roughriders	5	2025
Toronto Argonauts	5	2024
Winnipeg Blue Bombers	5	2021
Hamilton Tiger-Cats	4	2014
Ottawa Rough Riders	1	1976 (Note: Ottawa Rough Riders ceased operation after completing the 1996 CFL season)
Ottawa Redblacks	1	2016 (Note: Ottawa Redblacks started operation as of the 2014 CFL season)
Total for 10 Clubs	52	

== See also ==
- Grey Cup Most Valuable Player
