= 60th Grey Cup =

1972 Canadian Football championship game

Hamilton Tiger-Cats	Saskatchewan Roughriders
(11–3)	(8–8)
13	10
Head coach: Jerry Williams	Head coach: Dave Skrien
	1	2	3	4	Total
Hamilton Tiger-Cats	10	0	0	3	13
Saskatchewan Roughriders	0	10	0	0	10
- Date: December 3, 1972
- Stadium: Ivor Wynne Stadium
- Location: Hamilton
- Most Valuable Player: Chuck Ealey, QB (Tiger-Cats)
- Most Valuable Canadian: Ian Sunter, K (Tiger-Cats)
- National anthem: Bobby Curtola
- Attendance: 33,993

Broadcasters
- Network: CBC, CTV, SRC

The 60th Grey Cup was played on December 3, 1972, before 33,993 fans at the Ivor Wynne Stadium at Hamilton. It was the last Grey Cup to be played in December until 2021, which, coincidentally, was also held in Hamilton. The Hamilton Tiger-Cats defeated the Saskatchewan Roughriders 13–10.

== Box Score ==
First quarter

Hamilton - TD – Dave Fleming 16 yard pass from Chuck Ealey (convert Ian Sunter) 4:16
Hamilton – FG – Ian Sunter 27 yards 1:02

Second quarter

Saskatchewan - TD – Tom Campana 8 yard pass from Ron Lancaster (convert Jack Abendschan) 12:34
Saskatchewan – FG – Jack Abendschan 20 yards 1:41

Third quarter

No scoring

Fourth quarter

Hamilton – FG – Ian Sunter 34 yards 0:00

Teams	1 Q	2 Q	3 Q	4 Q	Final
Hamilton Tiger-Cats	10	0	0	3	13
Saskatchewan Roughriders	0	10	0	0	10

== Game summary ==
An interception of a Ron Lancaster pass by Hamilton's Al Brenner led to a 16-yard touchdown pass from Chuck Ealey to Dave Fleming. The score stood despite replays clearly showing that Fleming was out of bounds when he caught Ealey's pass. Later in the first quarter Bob Krouse of Hamilton had his first of two blocked punts. Hamilton recovered but had to settle for a 27-yard Ian Sunter field goal. Brenner appeared to have a second interception for a 27-yard touchdown return, but it was called back on a Hamilton offside.

In the second quarter, Saskatchewan tied the game with an 8-yard Lancaster to Tom Campana pass and a 20-yard Jack Abendschan field goal.

With just under two minutes to play in the game and Hamilton on their own 15-yard line, Ealey completed a 27-yard pass to Tony Gabriel; it was Gabriel's first catch of the day. Ealey immediately went back to Gabriel for 12 yards, and a play later threw to Gabriel a third time to get to the Saskatchewan 41-yard line with 51 seconds left. Hamilton then ran the clock down while getting close enough for Ian Sunter to kick a 34-yard field goal on the last play of the game for the win.

== Notable facts ==
- Ealey completed 18 of 29 pass attempts for 291 yards; Lancaster was 20 of 29 for 239 yards. Each had a touchdown and two interceptions.
- Saskatchewan's George Reed had 93 total rushing yards, 64 of them in the second quarter. Hamilton's Garney Henley had 98 yards receiving, the most of any player.
- The Most Valuable Player was Chuck Ealey and Ian Sunter was the Most Valuable Canadian. Sunter was 19 years old at the time.
- The Tiger-Cats became the first team in the CFL's modern era to win the Grey Cup at home.
- This was the first Grey Cup game played on AstroTurf; the previous year's game was played on a competing artificial surface, 3M Tartan Turf.
- Prior to this game, the CFL record for successful field goal attempts in a Grey Cup championship game was two.
- Until 2021, this was the last Grey Cup game to be played in December. Due to the delay in starting the 2021 CFL season as a result of the COVID-19 pandemic in Canada, the 108th Grey Cup (also held in Hamilton) took place on December 12.
