= Marv Levy =

American gridiron football coach (born 1925)

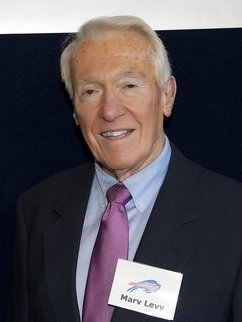
- Levy in 2009

Profile
- Position: Defensive back

Personal information
- Born: August 3, 1925 (age 101); Chicago, Illinois, U.S.

Career information
- High school: South Shore (Chicago)
- College: Wyoming, Coe

Career history

Coaching
- St. Louis Country Day School (1951–1952) Head coach; Coe (1953–1954) Assistant coach; New Mexico (1954–1958) Assistant coach; New Mexico (1958–1959) Head coach; California (1960–1963) Head coach; William & Mary (1964–1968) Head coach; Philadelphia Eagles (1969) Kickers coach; Los Angeles Rams (1970) Special teams coach; Washington Redskins (1971–1972) Special teams coach; Montreal Alouettes (1973–1977) Head coach; Kansas City Chiefs (1978–1982) Head coach; Chicago Blitz (1984) Head coach; Buffalo Bills (1986–1997) Head coach

Operations
- Buffalo Bills (2006–2007) General manager

Awards and highlights
- 2× Grey Cup champion (1974, 1977); Annis Stukus Trophy (1974); Sporting News NFL Coach of the Year (1988); NFL 1990s All-Decade Team; Buffalo Bills Wall of Fame; Buffalo Bills 50th Anniversary Team; SoCon champion (1966)

Head coaching record
- Regular season: NFL: 143–112 (.561); CFL: 43–31–4 (.577); NCAA: 45–60–5 (.432)
- Postseason: NFL: 11–8 (.579); CFL: 7–3 (.700)
- Career: NFL: 154–120 (.562); CFL: 50–34–4 (.591)
- Coaching profile at Pro Football Reference
- Executive profile at Pro Football Reference
- Pro Football Hall of Fame
- Canadian Football Hall of Fame

Marvin Daniel Levy (/ˈliːviː/; born August 3, 1925) is an American former football coach who served as a head coach in the National Football League (NFL) for 17 seasons. He spent most of his head coaching career with the Buffalo Bills, leading them from 1986 to 1997. Levy is widely considered the greatest Buffalo Bills coach of all time.

After spending 10 years as head coach in college, Levy was hired to coach the Montreal Alouettes of the Canadian Football League (CFL) in 1973. From 1973 to 1977, he won two Grey Cup titles with Montreal. After five seasons coaching the Kansas City Chiefs, Levy helped the Bills become one of the most dominant American Football Conference (AFC) teams during the 1990s.

His greatest success occurred between 1990 and 1993 when he led Buffalo to a record four consecutive Super Bowls, although each game ended in defeat. Levy concluded his head coaching career with 11 playoff victories and four Super Bowl appearances, both of which are the most of head coaches to not win an NFL championship. (Note: Levy is tied with Dan Reeves for the most playoff wins without an NFL championship and with Reeves and Bud Grant for the most Super Bowl appearances without a championship.)

After having retired from coaching in 1997, Levy served as the general manager of the Bills from 2006 to 2007. He was inducted to the Pro Football Hall of Fame in 2001 and the Canadian Football Hall of Fame in 2021.

== Early life ==
Levy was born to a Jewish family in Chicago on August 3, 1925.

In 1943, the day after graduation from South Shore High School in Chicago, Levy enlisted in the United States Army Air Forces. He served as a meteorologist at Apalachicola Army Airfield in Franklin County, Florida, but the war ended before his unit deployed to the Pacific.

Though he was known to use historical examples to inspire his teams, Levy corrected those who used war and combat metaphors to describe football games by telling them that he actually fought in a war (despite not being deployed), and that football and war were in no way comparable. Referring to the Super Bowl, he said "This is not a must-win; World War II was a must-win". Steve Tasker, who played for Levy on the Bills, said

Marv always had a knack for always finding the right thing to say. He wasn't a believer in Knute Rockne, 'Win one for the Gipper' speeches. He didn't like ripping us. But what he said had an effect on us, one way or another. It either got us mad at our opponents or mad at ourselves. Marv was a master psychologist at knowing what buttons to push.

In later years, Levy became a supporter of the World War II Memorial and pushed for World War II veterans to be honored at Super Bowl LIV to commemorate the 75th anniversary of the Allied victory in the war, noting that fewer than 3% of those who served in the war were still alive in 2020.

== Playing career ==
Levy was initially recruited to the Wyoming Cowboys football team as a defensive back. The coach who recruited Levy left Wyoming, and Levy was displeased and exhausted by the following coach's round-the-clock training regimen. He transferred to Coe College in Cedar Rapids, Iowa following a single semester.

At Coe College, Levy earned varsity letters in football, track, and basketball. He obtained a degree in English literature, was granted membership in Phi Beta Kappa society, and was twice voted student council president. He was also a member of the Tau Kappa Epsilon fraternity.

He was admitted to Harvard University for graduate studies in 1951, where he earned a Masters of Arts in English history. His thesis, which he was advised on by Sidney Bradshaw Fay, was on the effect of the Lend-Lease program on Anglo-American relations.

== Coaching career ==
Levy's first coaching job was at St. Louis Country Day School, coaching football and basketball; he coached the school's basketball team to a championship.

=== College ===
Two years later, Levy returned to Coe College as an assistant football coach (1953–1954). In his second stint as a head coach, he also won a championship in basketball; future NBA Coach Bill Fitch was one of his players.

In 1954, he joined the coaching staff at the University of New Mexico and was named head coach in 1958. In two seasons as head coach, he guided the Lobos to a 14–6 record and earned Skyline Conference Coach of the Year honors in 1958. He interviewed with the University of California, Berkeley on February 2, 1960, and was announced as the new head coach of the Cal Bears on February 5, 1960. Despite selecting a young Bill Walsh as a coaching assistant, Levy's best record during his four-season tenure as head coach at Cal from 1960 to 1963 was 4–5–1.

He finished his college coaching career with a five-year stint as head coach at the College of William and Mary where he twice earned Southern Conference Coach of the Year honors. In 1965 his team had the school's first winning record in 12 years.

=== Professional ===
==== Philadelphia Eagles, Los Angeles Rams, and Washington Redskins ====
Levy began his professional football coaching career in 1969 as kicking teams coach for the Philadelphia Eagles before joining George Allen's staff as a special teams coach for the Los Angeles Rams in 1970. He followed Allen to Washington, D.C., in 1971, where he served as the Washington Redskins' special teams coach for two seasons.

==== Canadian Football League ====
Levy then served as the head coach of the Montreal Alouettes of the Canadian Football League for five seasons. He coached Montreal to three CFL Grey Cup appearances and two championships, and won the Annis Stukus Trophy (Coach of the Year) in 1974.

==== Kansas City Chiefs ====
Levy returned to the NFL in 1978 as head coach of the Kansas City Chiefs. He coached the Chiefs for five seasons with steady improvement each year, but was fired at the end of the strike-shortened 1982 season with a 3–6 record.

==== Buffalo Bills ====
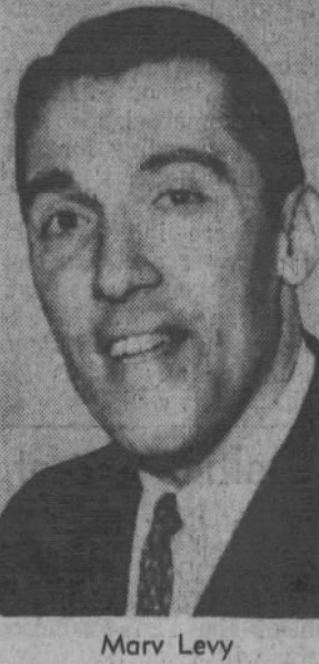
Marv Levy in 1963

Midway through the 1986 season, following a two-year hiatus from coaching and one season as the head coach of the Chicago Blitz of the USFL, Levy returned to the NFL with the Buffalo Bills. Initially hired as a television analyst, Levy replaced Hank Bullough nine games into the regular season as head coach. He finished the season with a 2–5 record.

In 1987, his first full season with the Bills, the team returned to respectability with a 7–8 record and were in the playoff hunt throughout most of the season. The following season the team posted a 12–4 record and won the first of six AFC Eastern Division titles.

With his high-powered "no-huddle" offense, Levy's Bills went on to make four consecutive Super Bowl appearances from 1990 to 1993, the most in league history. Each game ended in defeat, however, tying Levy with Bud Grant and Dan Reeves for the most Super Bowl appearances without a victory. Nonetheless, he is credited with changing the franchise's culture. When the Bills won the 1988 AFC East title, it was only the Bills' fourth playoff appearance since the AFL-NFL merger and their fifth winning season since winning two consecutive AFL titles in 1964 and 1965.

From 1988 through 1997, the Bills were first in the AFC in winning percentage and second only to the San Francisco 49ers in the NFL. Levy, the winningest coach in Bills' history, recorded a 112–70 regular season record and was 11–8 in the playoffs. He was named NFL Coach of the Year in 1988 and AFC Coach of the Year in 1988, 1993, and 1995.

Levy retired after the 1997 season, when he felt that it was time to rest, doing so despite the pleas of Wilson to stay. He later stated that he regretted the decision. He later became an analyst for NFL.com. In 2001, Levy was elected to the Pro Football Hall of Fame in Canton, Ohio. Along with former Bills' special-teamer Steve Tasker, Levy did local broadcasts for the Bills' pre-season games from 1998 until being appointed the Bills' general manager in 2006. During the regular season he was a part of the Chicago Bears pregame show on ESPN Radio 1000 (WMVP-AM), as well as a Bears postgame show on Comcast SportsNet.

Early in his tenure with the Bills, an emotional Levy gathered the team around him and exclaimed, "Where else would you rather be than right here, right now?" The question became a standard part of Levy's pregame routine, and was adopted as a battle cry by the Bills during their resurgence under Sean McDermott. Before each game, a Bills legend leads the crowd at Highmark Stadium in the chant.

=== General manager ===
On January 5, 2006, Bills owner Ralph Wilson enlisted Levy, at the age of 80, to act as general manager and vice president of football operations for the Buffalo Bills. Following the resignation of Mike Mularkey, there was initial speculation (created by Levy's own comments at a team press conference) that Levy would resume a coaching role with the team. To eliminate this speculation, and to minimize any future tension between Levy and the Bills' new head coach, team owner Wilson said: "He was hired to be the GM and would never coach the team."

Levy's first order of business was to hire a new coach as a replacement for Mularkey, who resigned within days of Levy's appointment. After a strenuous interview process Levy and team owner Wilson hired Detroit Lions interim head coach Dick Jauron as coach. Jauron had been head coach of the Chicago Bears.

=== Post-coaching career ===
Following the Bills' last game of the 2007 season, Levy decided to step down as general manager of the Bills following the expiration of his two-year contract.

He returned to live in his native Chicago, although he also spent some time in Montreal mentoring then-Alouettes head coach Marc Trestman. Levy stated he would be open to returning to coaching if asked.

From 1999–2000, Levy appeared as a studio analyst at Fox NFL Sunday and Fox Sports Network. In 2002, he was color commentator for the NFL on FOX with Ron Pitts for select games.

In 2009, Levy collaborated with Buffalo football historian Jeffrey J. Miller to write a book entitled Game Changers: The Greatest Plays in Buffalo Bills Football History.

In August 2011, Levy published a second book, Between the Lies, featuring a team based loosely on the Bills and including a quarterback named "Kelly James" progressing to the Super Bowl against a Los Angeles-based team and its take-no-prisoners head coach, while a scandal erupts, placing the integrity of the game at risk.

A lifelong Chicago Cubs fan, Levy was among a select few people in attendance at both the 1945 World Series, which he attended while on furlough from the Army Air Forces, and the Cubs' next appearance, the 2016 World Series.

Levy's fourth book, the children's book Go Cubs Go, is about the 2016 series.

In 2017, he said that he has not paid much attention to professional football in the past several years as of 2017.

In 2020, Levy assisted The Friends of the National World War II Memorial to convince NFL teams—and the league itself—to recognize the 75th anniversary of the war, honoring veterans at Super Bowl LIV in Miami.

In 2021, he was inducted into the Canadian Football Hall of Fame.

In 2022, Levy appeared at the Bills' home opener along with Jim Kelly, his former quarterback. Kelly passed the mic to Levy, who led the crowd in the "right here, right now" chant. On January 19, 2025, he delivered a pre-recorded message of well-wishes to the Bills squad ahead of its playoff game with the Baltimore Ravens. He again sent a pre-recorded statement for the final regular season game at the Bills' home stadium on January 3, 2026. He has been a close mentor and friend to former Bills coach Sean McDermott.

== Personal life ==
In 1995, Levy was diagnosed with prostate cancer and underwent surgery. Levy is a vegetarian. He is an opponent of hunting, commenting that "there is no need to be cruel to humans or to other forms of animal life". He was on the National Council of the Great American MeatOut, a campaign to persuade Americans to abstain from eating meat on March 20 (first day of spring).

Levy met his first wife Dorothy Prout while attending Coe College and married in 1951. They had no children together. He was married to his second wife, Mary Frances Kozlowski, from 1993 to the present. They have a daughter, Kimberly, and two grandchildren Angela (oldest) and George (youngest). Levy is the oldest living Pro Football Hall of Fame member.

On August 3, 2025, Levy turned 100, celebrating with an appearance at the Hall of Fame.

== Head coaching record ==
=== College ===
Year	Team	Overall	Conference	Standing	Bowl/playoffs
New Mexico Lobos (Skyline Conference) (1958–1959)
1958	New Mexico	7–3	5–1	2nd	
1959	New Mexico	7–3	4–2	3rd	
New Mexico:		14–6	9–3		
California Golden Bears (Athletic Association of Western Universities) (1960–1963)
1960	California	2–7–1	1–3	4th	
1961	California	1–8–1	1–3	T–4th	
1962	California	1–9	0–4	6th	
1963	California	4–5–1	1–3	5th	
California:		8–29–3	3–13		
William & Mary Indians (Southern Conference) (1964–1968)
1964	William & Mary	4–6	4–3	T–4th	
1965	William & Mary	6–4	5–1	2nd	
1966	William & Mary	5–4–1	4–1–1	T–1st	
1967	William & Mary	5–4–1	2–2–1	4th	
1968	William & Mary	3–7	2–3	5th	
William & Mary:		23–25–2	17–10–2		
Total:		45–60–5			
National championship Conference title Conference division title or championship game berth

=== Professional ===
Team	Year	Regular season					Postseason			
Team	Year	Won	Lost	Ties	Win %	Finish	Won	Lost	Win %	Result
MTL	1973	7	6	1	.536	3rd in East	1	1	.500	Lost to Ottawa Rough Riders in East Final.
MTL	1974	9	5	2	.625	1st in East	2	0	1.000	Won over Edmonton Eskimos in 62nd Grey Cup.
MTL	1975	9	7	0	.563	2nd in East	2	1	0.667	Lost to Edmonton Eskimos in 63rd Grey Cup.
MTL	1976	7	8	1	.469	3rd in East	0	1	0.000	Lost to Hamilton Tiger-Cats in East Semi-Final.
MTL	1977	11	5	0	.689	1st in East	2	0	1.000	Won over Edmonton Eskimos in 65th Grey Cup.
CFL Total		43	31	4	.577		7	3	.700	Won two Grey Cup Championships.
KC	1978	4	12	0	.250	5th in AFC West	–	–	–	–
KC	1979	7	9	0	.438	5th in AFC West	–	–	–	–
KC	1980	8	8	0	.500	3rd in AFC West	–	–	–	–
KC	1981	9	7	0	.563	3rd in AFC West	–	–	–	–
KC	1982	3	6	0	.333	4th in AFC West	–	–	–	–
KC Total		31	42	0	.425		–	–	–	
CHI	1984	5	13	0	.278	5th in Central	–	–	–	–
USFL Total		5	13	0	.278		–	–	–	
BUF	1986	2	5	0	.286	4th in AFC East	–	–	–	–
BUF	1987	7	8	0	.467	4th in AFC East	–	–	–	–
BUF	1988	12	4	0	.750	1st in AFC East	1	1	.500	Lost to Cincinnati Bengals in AFC Championship Game
BUF	1989	9	7	0	.563	1st in AFC East	0	1	.000	Lost to Cleveland Browns in AFC Divisional Game
BUF	1990	13	3	0	.813	1st in AFC East	2	1	.667	Lost to New York Giants in Super Bowl XXV
BUF	1991	13	3	0	.813	1st in AFC East	2	1	.667	Lost to Washington Redskins in Super Bowl XXVI
BUF	1992	11	5	0	.688	2nd in AFC East	3	1	.750	Lost to Dallas Cowboys in Super Bowl XXVII
BUF	1993	12	4	0	.750	1st in AFC East	2	1	.667	Lost to Dallas Cowboys in Super Bowl XXVIII
BUF	1994	7	9	0	.438	4th in AFC East	–	–	–	–
BUF	1995	10	6	0	.625	1st in AFC East	1	1	.500	Lost to Pittsburgh Steelers in AFC Divisional Game
BUF	1996	10	6	0	.625	2nd in AFC East	0	1	.000	Lost to Jacksonville Jaguars in AFC Wild Card Game
BUF	1997	6	10	0	.375	4th in AFC East	–	–	–	–
BUF Total		112	70	0	.615		11	8	.579	
NFL Total		143	112	0	.561		11	8	.579	
Total		191	156	4	.550		18	11	.621	

== Career highlights ==
- Won two of three CFL Grey Cup championship games in five seasons while head coach of the Montreal Alouettes
- Guided the Bills to six division championships (including four consecutive from 1988 to 1991)
- Compiled a 17–6 record (14–6 in the regular season and 3–0 in the post-season) against the winningest coach in NFL history, Don Shula. He is one of only two coaches to have a winning record against Shula, the other being Tom Flores of the Raiders, who went 6–1 against him.
- Compiled 209 CFL-NFL-USFL coaching victories (T12th in Pro Football History)
- One of only 15 coaches to win 100 games with one NFL team
- The only coach to compete in four Super Bowls in a row
- Retired at the age of 72; tied at the time with George Halas as the oldest non-interim head coach in NFL history.
- First USFL alumnus to be inducted into the Pro Football Hall of Fame
- One of only two coaches to appear in both a Grey Cup Championship Game and the Super Bowl. The other is Bud Grant.
- Oldest coach ever to win 12 games (age 68) and 10 games (age 71)
- One of only three people to be enshrined in both the Pro Football Hall of Fame (NFL), and the Canadian Football Hall of Fame.

== Books ==
- Marv Levy: Where Else Would You Rather Be?, Sports Publishing, 2004. ISBN 1-58261-797-X.
- Game Changers: The Greatest Plays in Buffalo Bills History (with Jeffrey Miller), Triumph Books, 2009. ISBN 1-60078-275-2.
- Between the Lies (fiction), Ascend Books, 2011. ISBN 0-9830619-3-9.
- Go Cubs Go! Baseball's Never Give Up Story (children's, with George Castle, illustrated by Rob Peters), Ascend Books 2017. ISBN 978-0996674270.

== See also ==
- Iowa Sports Hall of Fame
- List of National Football League head coaches with 50 wins
- List of National Football League head coaches with 200 wins
