= Sonny Wade =

American gridiron football player (born 1947)

No. 14
- Positions: Quarterback, punter

Personal information
- Born: April 1, 1947 (age 79); Martinsville, Virginia, U.S.
- Listed height: 6 ft 3 in (1.91 m)
- Listed weight: 210 lb (95 kg)

Career information
- High school: Martinsville
- College: Emory & Henry
- NFL draft: 1969: 10th round, 236th overall pick

Career history
- 1969–1978: Montreal Alouettes
- 1979: Philadelphia Eagles*
- * Offseason or practice squad member only

Awards and highlights
- 3× Grey Cup champion (1970, 1974, 1977); 3× Grey Cup MVP (1970, 1974, 1977); First-team Little All-American (1968)

Jesse Harold "Sonny" Wade (born April 1, 1947) is an American former professional football player for the Montreal Alouettes of the Canadian Football League (CFL) from 1969 to 1978. He was an All-American at Emory & Henry College in Virginia.

== Early life ==
Wade attended Martinsville High School where he played football, basketball, and baseball. He was selected to the first team all-state football team as both a quarterback and punter. Not only excelling in football, Wade also was on the 1964 State Basketball Championship team and performed well enough on the baseball diamond so that he was offered a professional baseball contract by the Pittsburgh Pirates franchise out of high school. Spurning the baseball contract, Wade decided to attend Virginia Tech on a full football scholarship after graduating in 1965.

== College career ==
Once at Virginia Tech, Wade was one of 9 Freshman quarterbacks and earned his position as the quarterback of the Freshman team. After having philosophical differences with Head Coach Jerry Claiborne Wade decided that he was going to transfer schools and play football somewhere else. Prior to transferring, Wade went back for summer camp and worked his way up to starting quarterback. Upon being named first-string quarterback, Wade informed the coaching staff that he would be leaving.

After transferring out, Wade found himself at Emory & Henry College in Southwest Virginia where he participated in football, basketball, and baseball. While at Emory and Henry, Wade started at quarterback where he also assumed the role of punter, placekicker, and offensive coordinator by calling his own plays.

He led the nation in scoring during the 1967 season with 141 points. With his athletic ability and astute play calling, Wade also led the team to a national record in total offense with an average of 553.3 yards per game during the 1968 season. During that same 1968 season, he was second in the nation in total offense and passing, threw 28 touchdowns, rushed for 9 touchdowns, kicked 31 extra points, had a 9–1 winning record, and was voted 1st team Associated Press Little All-American Quarterback, his second straight All-America selection (he was also a 1st team selection for the 1967 season).

Wade was voted Virginia's College Football Player of the Year in 1966, 67, and 68. As a result of his performance in the 1968 season, Wade was selected to play quarterback at the North-South Shriners Classic football game.

One year after graduating, he was inducted into the E&H Hall of Fame and his #18 jersey was retired.

== Professional career ==
=== Montreal Alouettes ===
==== 1969 ====
Expected to be selected in one of the first several rounds of the 1969 NFL draft, Wade's draft position slipped to the tenth round after throwing three interceptions in the North-South game and was selected by the Philadelphia Eagles with the 236th overall pick. Wade was also selected by the Montreal Alouettes of the Canadian Football League and in the days prior to TV deals and large salaries offered to players, he was offered the same contract terms for both teams and decided to head to Montreal after extensive changes were made in the Philadelphia front office.

Wade joined the Montreal Alouettes in 1969 after they had suffered 9 straight losing seasons. Coached by former Alouettes great Sam Etcheverry and starting in the 1973 season the famed Marv Levy, Wade became one of the most clutch players in Grey Cup history.

Wade started his first game in Montreal on the defensive side of the ball. He played his first Canadian Football League plays as the "monster man", which is the 12th man in Canadian football that is a hybrid between a defensive back and linebacker. After diving for an interception and dropping it upon hitting the ground, Wade started the next offensive series as quarterback and it is from that position and as punter where he achieved his lasting fame.

His first season in 1969 was statistically not great with 164 completions out of 348 attempts for a completion percentage of 47.1%. He also was intercepted a total of 30 times that year with only 12 passing TDs. Montreal finished the season with a record of 2–10–2 and finished fourth in the eastern conference.

==== 1970 ====
The following season things turned around for both Wade and the Alouettes. Although Wade posted similar statistics as the prior year, including a career high of 31 interceptions thrown for the season, the Alouettes finished the season with a 7–6–1 record heading into the playoffs. Known for his cool headed play in the post season, Wade led the team to a 4–0 record in the playoffs including the 1970 Grey Cup victory where they Alouettes defeated the Calgary Stampeders 23–10. For his performance in this game, Wade was awarded the first of his three Grey Cup MVP awards.

==== 1974 ====
Injured in the 1973 season and only playing one game, he returned to the 1974 season to split time with Jimmy Jones at quarterback. The Als fared well during this season with the dual QB lineup and made it to the Grey Cup where they faced the favoured Edmonton Eskimos. After a largely ineffective performance by Jimmy Jones, Wade came in during the second quarter with the Als down 7–0 and led the team to a 20–7 victory and was awarded his second Grey Cup MVP award.

==== 1975 ====
The following year the Als again met the Eskimos in the Grey Cup and Wade again reprised his role as relief for an ineffective Jimmy Jones and led the team on a late fourth-quarter drive deep into Edmonton territory before falling 9–8 on a missed field goal attempt.

==== 1977 ====
Wade and the Alouettes once again played the Eskimos in the Grey Cup after the 1977 season where during the 65th Grey Cup of 1977, while quarterbacking on ice, he completed 22 of 40 passes for 340 yards, 3 touchdowns and 1 interception in a crushing 41–6 win over the Edmonton Eskimos. After this game he received his third Grey Cup MVP award.

Wade was known to perform exceptionally well under difficult weather conditions, playing better in the playoffs than the regular season. During his 10 years with Montreal, he completed 1083 of his 2087 passes, for 51.9%, and 15,014 yards. He threw for 89 touchdowns, but his greatest weakness was the interception, and he was picked off 169 times. This includes 30 picks in his rookie season of 1969 and 31 in the Grey Cup championship year of 1970. He also had a record 7 interceptions thrown against the Calgary Stampeders on September 24, 1972. In addition, he still hold the Als record for most punts, with 852. He was the first three-time winner of the Grey Cup Most Valuable Player award, equalled by Doug Flutie and Damon Allen.

=== Philadelphia Eagles ===
After the 1978 season with the Als and a career of injuries, Wade decided to head to Philadelphia to play as the backup quarterback and the punter but suffered a career ending injury after a few minutes of the first day of training camp. After that final injury, Wade decided to head back to his hometown of Martinsville to settle down.

== Career regular season statistics ==
Statistics			Passing							Punting				
Year	Team	GP	Att	Com	%	Yds	TD	Int	Lg	#	Yds	Ave.	Lg	TD
1969	Montreal Alouettes	14	348	164	47.1	2,719	12	30	68	114	4,721	41.4	87	9
1970**	Montreal Alouettes	14	322	170	52.8	2,411	14	31	56	102	4,157	40.8	73	4
1971	Montreal Alouettes	14	338	155	45.9	2,090	8	27	91	79	3,073	38.9	64	1
1972	Montreal Alouettes	13	219	118	53.9	1,537	9	26	50	86	3,402	39.6	69	3
1973	Montreal Alouettes	1	5	3	60.0	27	0	2	10	4	198	49.5	63	0
1974**	Montreal Alouettes	13	64	35	54.7	551	5	5	75	105	4,179	39.8	80	0
1975	Montreal Alouettes	16	196	103	52.6	1,415	12	11	70	124	5,139	41.4	63	4
1976	Montreal Alouettes	16	382	205	53.7	2,504	17	27	62	137	5,846	42.7	63	2
1977**	Montreal Alouettes	13	136	91	66.9	1,210	9	5	105	95	4,141	43.6	60	3
1978	Montreal Alouettes	4	77	39	50.6	550	3	5	64	6	274	45.7	50	0
	Totals		2,087	1,083	51.9	15,014	89	169	105	852	35,130	41.2	87	26

  - denotes Grey Cup champion and MVP

== Post-football career ==
After football, Wade entered the textile industry in his hometown of Martinsville, Virginia which during the 1980s and early 1990s was known as the "sweatshirt capital of the world".

After a 20-year career in sweatshirt sales, Wade retired in 1999 and lives out his golden years farming, hunting, gardening, trapping, and fishing. Wade also sells some homegrown fruit and vegetables at local farmers markets.

Sonny was inducted into the Virginia Sports Hall of Fame in 1994 for his accomplishments as a college football standout as well as for his achievements in the Canadian Football League.
