= Dave Cutler (Canadian football) =

Canadian gridiron football player (b. 1945)

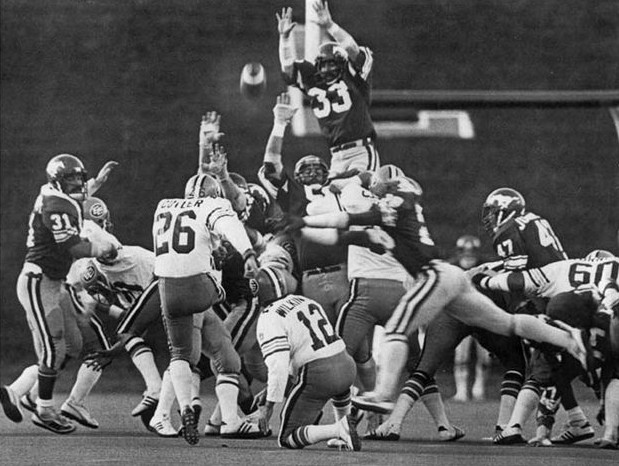
- Cutler (No. 26) attempts to kick a field goal against the Calgary Stampeders

No. 26
- Position: Kicker

Personal information
- Born: October 17, 1945 (age 81); Biggar, Saskatchewan, Canada
- Listed height: 5 ft 10 in (1.78 m)
- Listed weight: 185 lb (84 kg)

Career information
- University: Simon Fraser
- CFL draft: 1969: 1st round, 4th overall pick

Career history
- 1969–1984: Edmonton Eskimos

Awards and highlights
- 6× Grey Cup champion (1975, 1978–1982); Dick Suderman Trophy (1975); 8× Dave Dryburgh Memorial Trophy (1972−1975, 1977, 1978, 1980, 1981); Dr. Beattie Martin Trophy (1973); 2× CFL All-Star (1977, 1978); 3× CFL West All-Star (1977, 1978, 1980); Edmonton Eskimos Wall of Honour (1986); Eskimos records: Longest field goal (59) - October 28, 1970; Longest kickoff (95) - August 6, 1975; Most field goals – season (50) - 1977; Most field goals – game (6) - October 22, 1972; Most singles – career (218); Most singles – game (5) - October 28, 1983

Career CFL statistics
- Field goals: 464/790
- FG %: 58.7%
- Longest FG: 59
- Kickoffs: 1,030
- Kickoff yardage: 60,527 (Avg: 58.8 yds)
- Canadian Football Hall of Fame (Class of 1998)

David Robert Stuart Cutler (born October 17, 1945) is a former all-star place kicker with the Edmonton Eskimos of the Canadian Football League (CFL). Cutler is considered by many to be the best field goal kicker in CFL history.

== CFL ==
A graduate of Simon Fraser University, and playing his entire 16-year career with the Eskimos, Cutler is the team's all time point scorer, with 2,237 points, having led the CFL in scoring seven times. He held the CFL career marks for most converts (627), field goals (464), singles (218), and total points (2,237) upon his retirement. He was an all star 4 times and was a member of 6 Grey Cup winning teams, including being an essential part of their great 5 win (1978–1982) dynasty. In 1970, his first all-star season, Cutler became the first CFL player to make a 59-yard field goal. One of his most memorable plays occurred with only seconds remaining in the 69th Grey Cup game of 1981 against Ottawa, where his field goal was not only game winning, but dynasty extending. His kick capped one of the most dramatic comebacks in Grey Cup history, as the Eskimos were down by 19 points at half-time.

== Awards and honours ==
Cutler is a member of the Simon Fraser University Sports Hall of Fame, the Edmonton Eskimos Wall of Honour, the Canadian Football Hall of Fame, and in 2016 was inducted into the BC Sports Hall of Fame.
