= Don Sweet =

Canadian gridiron football player (b. 1948)

No. 11
- Position: Kicker

Personal information
- Born: July 13, 1948 (age 78); Vancouver, British Columbia, Canada
- Listed height: 6 ft 0 in (1.83 m)
- Listed weight: 187 lb (85 kg)

Career information
- High school: Lord Byng (Vancouver, British Columbia)
- College: Washington State

Career history
- 1972–1981: Montreal Alouettes
- 1982–1984: Montreal Concordes
- 1985: Hamilton Tiger-Cats

Awards and highlights
- 2× Grey Cup champion (1974, 1977); 3× Dick Suderman Trophy (1974, 1977, 1979); 3× CFL East All-Star (1977, 1978, 1979); First-team All-Pac-8 (1971)

Don Sweet (born July 13, 1948) is a former star football placekicker for the Montreal Alouettes and Montreal Concordes of the Canadian Football League (CFL).

== College years ==
Sweet graduated from Washington State University in 1971. He was a Pacific-10 Conference all star kicker in 1971. Perhaps his greatest moment happened when WSU upset defending conference champions Stanford 24 to 23 in 1971. His 27-yard game-winning field goal was scored with no time left on the game clock. Sweet had never played football before he tried out for his university team.

== Professional career ==
In 1972, he began a successful 13-year career with Montreal, the second longest in team history. He played with the Alouettes until 1981 and with the Concordes three more years.

He played 185 regular season games, scoring a team record 1,342 points, including 312 field goals and 325 converts. His most points was in 1976, with 141, and he was an all star in 1977, 1978 and 1979.

Perhaps his greatest fame came in the ultimate CFL limelight, the Grey Cup. He played in that championship 5 times with the Alouettes, winning in 1974 and 1977 and losing in 1975, 1978, and 1979. He scored 61 total Grey Cup points, and his best game was the 1977 Ice Bowl, when he scored a record 23 points and kicked a record 6 field goals. He won the Grey Cup Most Valuable Canadian awards three times, in 1974, 1977, and 1979.

Sweet travelled from the heights of glory with the Alouettes to the basement as a member of the newly franchised Concordes. He played 48 games with them over three years, including the dreadful 1982 season, with 2 wins and 14 losses.

== Sexual assault allegations ==
Sweet, who served as both a teacher and a school principal in the Mission school district before retiring in 2010, was charged on March 6, 2021 with four counts of sexual interference, two counts of sexual assault and one count of assault. Two women have accused Sweet of sexually assaulting them while they were Grade 6 and 7 students at Durieu Elementary School in Mission BC in 2007 and 2008.
