= Donald Barker =

Canadian CFL referee and Hall of Famer

Profile
- Position: Referee

Personal information
- Born: November 29, 1929; Edmonton, Alberta
- Died: November 22, 2016 (aged 86); Surrey, British Columbia

Career history

Official
- 1958–1981: CFL Official
- Canadian Football Hall of Fame (Class of 1999)

Donald "Don" Barker (November 29, 1929 – November 22, 2016) was a Canadian CFL referee. He officiated in more than 500 CFL games including 10 Grey Cup finals from 1958 to 1981.

After retiring he was the CFL Director of Officiating and a supervisor from 1985 through 1998. In 1999, he was inducted as a builder into the Canadian Football Hall of Fame. He died in 2016, a week shy of his 87th birthday.
