= 1973 Ottawa Rough Riders season =

Canadian football team season

- Owner: David Loeb
- General manager: Frank Clair
- Head coach: Jack Gotta
- Home stadium: Lansdowne Park

Results
- Record: 9–5
- Division place: 1st, East
- Playoffs: Won Grey Cup

Uniform

The 1973 Ottawa Rough Riders finished the season in first place in the Eastern Conference with a 9–5 record and won the 61st Grey Cup over the Edmonton Eskimos.

== Preseason ==
Game	Date	Opponent	Results		Venue	Attendance
Game	Date	Opponent	Score	Record	Venue	Attendance
A	Wed, July 4	vs. Winnipeg Blue Bombers	T 10–10	0–0–1	Lansdowne Park	14,917
B	Wed, July 11	vs. Edmonton Eskimos	W 25–16	1–0–1	Lansdowne Park	14,728
C	Thur, July 19	at Montreal Alouettes	L 14–17	1–1–1	Autostade	14,207
D	Tue, July 24	at Hamilton Tiger-Cats	W 13–9	2–1–1	Ivor Wynne Stadium	23,884

== Regular season ==
=== Standings ===
Eastern Football Conference
Team	GP	W	L	T	PF	PA	Pts
Ottawa Rough Riders	14	9	5	0	275	234	18
Toronto Argonauts	14	7	5	2	265	231	16
Montreal Alouettes	14	7	6	1	273	238	15
Hamilton Tiger-Cats	14	7	7	0	304	263	14

=== Schedule ===
Game	Date	Opponent	Results		Venue	Attendance
Game	Date	Opponent	Score	Record	Venue	Attendance
1	Tue, July 31	vs. Toronto Argonauts	L 9–25	0–1	Lansdowne Park	23,764
2	Wed, Aug 8	at Toronto Argonauts	L 6–19	0–2	Exhibition Stadium	33,135
3	Mon, Aug 13	vs. Hamilton Tiger-Cats	L 16–25	0–3	Lansdowne Park	22,087
4	Mon, Aug 20	at Saskatchewan Roughriders	L 12–18	0–4	Taylor Field	21,032
5	Sat, Aug 25	at Montreal Alouettes	W 30–3	1–4	Autostade	27,205
6	Wed, Sept 5	vs. BC Lions	W 26–24	2–4	Lansdowne Park	18,674
7	Wed, Sept 12	at Winnipeg Blue Bombers	W 24–13	3–4	Winnipeg Stadium	24,385
8	Sat, Sept 15	at Hamilton Tiger-Cats	W 21–19	4–4	Ivor Wynne Stadium	33,254
9	Sat, Sept 22	vs. Edmonton Eskimos	W 32–20	5–4	Lansdowne Park	20,306
10	Sun, Sept 30	vs. Montreal Alouettes	L 15–28	5–5	Lansdowne Park	26,316
11	Mon, Oct 8	at Hamilton Tiger-Cats	W 16–13	6–5	Ivor Wynne Stadium	34,050
12	Sun, Oct 14	at Calgary Stampeders	W 32–8	7–5	McMahon Stadium	18,450
13	Sun, Oct 21	vs. Toronto Argonauts	W 20–19	8–5	Lansdowne Park	25,328
14	Sun, Oct 28	vs. Montreal Alouettes	W 16–0	9–5	Lansdowne Park	26,734

== Postseason ==
=== Playoffs ===
Round	Date	Opponent	Results		Venue	Attendance
Round	Date	Opponent	Score	Record	Venue	Attendance
East Final	Sun, Nov 18	vs. Montreal Alouettes	W 23–14	1–0	Lansdowne Park	19,793
Grey Cup	Nov 25	Edmonton Eskimos	W 22–18	2–0	Exhibition Stadium	36,653

=== Grey Cup ===
Edmonton quarterback Tom Wilkinson was accused of using an unnatural head motion to draw the defence offside. Ottawa General Manager Frank Clair lobbied league officials to watch Wilkinson carefully at the line of scrimmage.

Teams	1 Q	2 Q	3 Q	4 Q	Final
Edmonton Eskimos	10	0	0	8	18
Ottawa Roughriders	7	5	7	3	22

== Player stats ==
=== Passing ===
Player	Attempts	Completions	Pct.	Yards	Touchdowns	Interceptions
Rick Cassata	177	94	53.1	1255	4	6

=== Rushing ===
Player	Rushes	Yards	Average	Touchdowns	Long
Art Green	54	223	4.1	2	14

== Roster ==
1973 Ottawa Rough Riders final roster
Quarterbacks: 6 Rick Cassata; 4 Jerry Keeling; Running backs: 28 Jim Evenson; 5 Jim Foley; 20 Art Green; 12 Terry Wellesley; Wide receivers: 27 Hugh Oldham; 71 Gerry Organ K/P; 77 Tom Pullen; Tight ends: 74 Rhome Nixon; 76 Tom Schultz	Offensive linemen: 61 Charlie Brandon G; 66 Doug Collins T; 42 Bob McKeown C; 51 Roger Perdrix G; 62 Moe Racine T; 56 Tom Schuette G; 64 Donn Smith C/T; Defensive linemen: 60 Tom Laputka DT; 73 Jim Piaskoski DE; 43 Frank Reid DT; 65 Rudy Sims DT; 75 Wayne Smith DE	Linebackers: 79 Jerry Campbell; 30 Dan Dever; 11 Wayne Giardino FB; 50 Mark Kosmos; Defensive backs: 33 Dickie Adams P; 3 John Kruspe; 15 Mike Law; 35 Willie McKelton; 31 Al Marcelin; 7 Wayne Tosh; 26 Rod Woodward; Italics indicate International player

== Awards and honours ==
- CFL's Most Outstanding Canadian Award – Gerry Organ (K)
- CFL's Coach of the Year – Jack Gotta
- Grey Cup Most Valuable Player, Charlie Brandon (DE)
- Dick Adams, Defensive Back, CFL All-Star
- Jerry Campbell, Linebacker, CFL All-Star
- Al Marcelin, Defensive Back, CFL All-Star
- Rudy Sims, Defensive Tackle, CFL All-Star
