= 1973 Toronto Argonauts season =

CFL team season

- Head coach: John Rauch
- Home stadium: Exhibition Stadium

Results
- Record: 7–5–2
- Division place: 2nd, East
- Playoffs: Lost Eastern Semi-Final

Uniform

The 1973 Toronto Argonauts finished in second place in the Eastern Conference with a 7–5–2 record. They appeared in the Eastern Semi-Final.

== Offseason ==
=== CFL draft ===
The Toronto Argonauts drafted the following players in the 1973 CFL draft.

Round	Pick	Player	Position	School
T	T	Louis Clare	Tailback	Minnesota
T	T	Peter Muller	Tight end	Western Illinois
1	2	Barry Findlay	Quarterback	McMaster
2	11	Greg Higson	Halfback	McMaster
3	20	Chris Skopelianos	Defensive back	Western Ontario
4	29	Wayne Cuncic	Guard	Utah State
5	38	Brian Wetsell	Defensive end	UBC
6	46	Bill Ross	Defensive end	Western Ontario
7	54	Larry Jack	Defensive tackle	New Brunswick
8	62	Bill Hunter	Defensive back	Western Ontario

== Regular season ==
=== Standings ===
Eastern Football Conference
Team	GP	W	L	T	PF	PA	Pts
Ottawa Rough Riders	14	9	5	0	275	234	18
Toronto Argonauts	14	7	5	2	265	231	16
Montreal Alouettes	14	7	6	1	273	238	15
Hamilton Tiger-Cats	14	7	7	0	304	263	14

=== Schedule ===
Week	Date	Opponent	Result	Record	Venue	Attendance
1	July 31	at Rough Riders	W 25–9	1–0	Landsdowne Park	23,764
2	Aug 8	vs. Ottawa Rough Riders	W 19–6	2–0	Exhibition Stadium	33,135
3	Aug 15	vs. Montreal Alouettes	W 22–21	3–0	Exhibition Stadium	33,135
4	Aug 22	at Hamilton Tiger-Cats	L 4–38	3–1	Ivor Wynne Stadium	35,347
5	Aug 29	at Edmonton Eskimos	W 24–16	4–1	Clarke Stadium	22,918
5	Sept 3	at Montreal Alouettes	T 23–23	4–1–1	Autostade	22,488
6	Sept 9	vs. Hamilton Tiger-Cats	W 16–7	5–1–1	Exhibition Stadium	33,135
7	Bye					
8	Sept 19	vs. Saskatchewan Roughriders	L 15–21	5–2–1	Exhibition Stadium	33,135
8	Sept 23	at Montreal Alouettes	L 10–19	5–3–1	Autostade	15,494
9	Sept 29	at BC Lions	T 22–22	5–3–2	Empire Stadium	23,400
10	Oct 6	vs. Calgary Stampeders	W 37–10	6–3–2	Exhibition Stadium	33,135
11	Oct 14	vs. Hamilton Tiger-Cats	L 11–16	6–4–2	Exhibition Stadium	33,135
12	Oct 21	at Ottawa Rough Riders	L 19–20	6–5–2	Landsdowne Park	25,328
13	Bye					
14	Nov 3	vs. Winnipeg Blue Bombers	W 18–3	7–5–2	Exhibition Stadium	33,135

== Postseason ==
Round	Date	Opponent	Results		Venue	Attendance
Round	Date	Opponent	Score	Record	Venue	Attendance
East Semi-Final	Sun, Nov 11	vs. Montreal Alouettes	L 10–32 (OT)	0–1	Exhibition Stadium	33,135

== Roster ==
1973 Toronto Argonauts final roster
Quarterbacks: 7 Joe Theismann; 8 Mike Rae; Running backs: 33 Ray Langcaster; 33 Bill Symons; 5 Pete Watson; Wide receivers: 23 Eric Allen; 75 Tommy Joe Coffey; 9 Mike Eben; 11 Tony Moro; Tight ends: 72 Peter Muller	Offensive linemen: 54 Ron Curl G; 44 Paul Desjardins C; 58 Stew Francis G; 56 Noah Jackson T; 62 Ron Mikolajczyk T; 64 John Trainor G; Defensive linemen: 71 Bruce Bergey DE; 79 Jim Corrigall DE; 51 Granville Liggins DT; 68 Jim Stillwagon DT; 69 Brian Westell DT	Linebackers: 31 Dick Aldridge OLB; 77 Mike Blum MLB; 76 Gene Mack OLB; 25 Tom Surlas OLB/MLB; Defensive backs: 12 Wayne Allison; 26 Tim Anderson; 27 Barry Finlay; 17 Peter Paquette; 14 Dave Raimey; 10 Gerry Sternberg; Special teams: 19 Zenon Andrusyshyn K/P; Italics indicate International player

== Awards and honors ==
- Jim Corrigall, Defensive End, CFL All-Star
- Paul Desjardins, Center, CFL All-Star
