= 1973 Hamilton Tiger-Cats season =

Season of Canadian Football League team the Hamilton Tiger-Cats

- Head coach: Jerry Williams
- Home stadium: Ivor Wynne Stadium

Results
- Record: 7–7
- Division place: 4th, East
- Playoffs: Did not qualify
- Team MOP: Andy Hopkins
- Team MOC: Tony Gabriel
- Team MOR: Louis Clare

Uniform

The 1973 Hamilton Tiger-Cats season was the 16th season for the team in the Canadian Football League (CFL) and their 24th overall. The Tiger-Cats finished in fourth place in the Eastern Conference with a 7–7 record and missed the playoffs for only the second time since the inception of the Tiger-Cats in 1950. In May 1973 the club was sold to Mr. Michael G. DeGroote, chairman and chief executive officer of Laidlaw Transportation Limited.

== Regular season ==
=== Season standings ===
Eastern Football Conference
Team	GP	W	L	T	PF	PA	Pts
Ottawa Rough Riders	14	9	5	0	275	234	18
Toronto Argonauts	14	7	5	2	265	231	16
Montreal Alouettes	14	7	6	1	273	238	15
Hamilton Tiger-Cats	14	7	7	0	304	263	14

=== Season schedule ===
Week	Game	Date	Opponent	Result	Record
1	1	Aug 1	vs. Montreal Alouettes	L 9–18	0–1
2	2	Aug 7	at Montreal Alouettes	14–21	0–2
3	3	Aug 13	at Ottawa Rough Riders	W 25–16	1–2
4	4	Aug 22	vs. Toronto Argonauts	W 38–4	2–2
5	5	Sept 3	vs. BC Lions	W 44–24	3–2
6	6	Sept 9	at Toronto Argonauts	L 7–16	3–3
7	7	Sept 15	vs. Ottawa Rough Riders	L 19–21	3–4
8	8	Sept 24	vs. Edmonton Eskimos	L 17–22	3–5
9	9	Sept 30	at Calgary Stampeders	W 31–29	4–5
10	10	Oct 3	at Winnipeg Blue Bombers	W 21–18	5–5
10	11	Oct 8	vs. Ottawa Rough Riders	L 13–16	5–6
11	12	Oct 14	at Toronto Argonauts	W 16–11	6–6
12	Bye				
13	13	Oct 28	at Saskatchewan Roughriders	L 25–34	6–7
14	14	Nov 4	vs. Montreal Alouettes	W 25–13	7–7

== Roster ==
1973 Hamilton Tiger-Cats final roster
**Quarterbacks**: 16 Chuck Ealey; 10 Bill Etter; **Running backs**: 21 Dave Fleming; 20 Andy Hopkins; 22 Mike Walker; **Wide receivers**: 77 Tony Gabriel; 26 Garney Henley; 70 Gary Kuzyk; **Tight ends**: 71 Bob Hamilton; 78 George Milosevic; 76 Bob Richardson	**Offensive linemen**: 58 Ed Chalupka G; 55 Bill Danychuk T; 52 Ken Ferguson C; 57 Jon Hohman G; 64 Jerome Gantt T; 66 Doug Mitchell C; **Defensive linemen**: 67 Dan Dulmage DT; 63 Fred Grambau DE; 65 Gary Inskeep DE; 62 Gord McColeman DT; 61 Bruce Smith DT; **Special teams**: 25 Alec Lockington P; 25 Ian Sunter K	**Linebackers**: 47 Larry Brame; 37 Steve Conley; 14 Bob Krouse; 42 Jamie Rotella; **Defensive backs**: 25 Al Brenner; 31 Lou Clare; 19 Dave Easley; 24 Lewis Porter; 73 Pete Ribbins; 23 John William; Italics indicate American players **Bold** indicates Global players
