= Harry Abofs =

German gridiron football player (1948–1993)

- Abofs in 1971

Profile
- Positions: Halfback, Defensive back

Personal information
- Born: April 14, 1948; Germany
- Died: August 29, 1993 (aged 45)
- Listed height: 6 ft 1 in (1.85 m)
- Listed weight: 207 lb (94 kg)

Career information
- High school: Downsview HS
- College: Tennessee Tech

Career history
- 1971–1972: Toronto Argonauts
- 1972–1973: Edmonton Eskimos
- 1973: BC Lions
- 1974: Hamilton Tiger-Cats

Harry Abofs (April 14, 1948 – August 29, 1993) was a Canadian football running back, defensive back, and return specialist for multiple Canadian Football League teams in the early 1970s. He played high school football at Downsview High School in Toronto. After playing college football for Tennessee Tech, Abofs went on to play for the Toronto Argonauts, the Edmonton Eskimos, the BC Lions, and the Hamilton Tiger-Cats.

Abofs found some success as a running back in his rookie year with Toronto, averaging 4.8 yards per carry, but is best known for his role in the 59th Grey Cup. In the fourth quarter of the game with the Argonauts down 14–11, Abofs received a punt from the Calgary Stampeders. In an effort to capture the wet ball, he accidentally kicked it out of bounds while reaching down. CFL rules state that when a ball is kicked out of bounds, possession goes to the opposing team, thus giving Calgary possession once again. Had Abofs knocked the ball out of bounds with his hand, Toronto would have had one last offensive series. Instead, Calgary ran out the clock and ultimately captured their first Grey Cup since 1948.

Abofs was later converted to a defensive back by the Edmonton Eskimos. After making three interceptions with the Eskimos in 1973, he continued in this role until his retirement from the CFL.

Abofs died of a cardiac arithmia (heart attack) on August 29, 1993.

== Season statistics ==
			Rushing					Receiving					Punt returns					Kick returns					Fumbles		Defense	
Year	Team	GP	Att	Yards	Avg	Long	TD	Catches	Yards	Avg	Long	TD	PR	Yards	Avg	Long	TD	KR	Yards	Avg	Long	TD	FUM	FR	INT	Yards
1971	TOR	14	22	106	4.8	26	1	10	67	6.7	34	1	57	227	4.0	15	0	4	71	17.8	25	0	1	0	0	0
1972	TOR	6	0	0	0	0	0	1	4	4.0	4	0	0	0	0	0	0	0	0	0	0	0	0	0	0	0
1972	ESK	7	0	0	0	0	0	0	0	0	0	0	0	0	0	0	0	8	152	19.0	23	0	0	0	1	1
1973	ESK	8	0	0	0	0	0	0	0	0	0	0	1	0	0.0	0	0	0	0	0	0	0	1	1	3	37
1973	BC	1	0	0	0	0	0	0	0	0	0	0	0	0	0.0	0	0	3	58	19.3	24	0	0	0	0	0
1974	HAM	9	0	0	0	0	0	0	0	0	0	0	31	108	3.5	13	0	0	0	0	0	0	2	3	0	0
Total		45	22	106	4.8	26	1	11	71	6.5	34	1	89	335	3.8	15	0	15	281	18.7	25	0	4	4	4	38
