= 1990 Pittsburgh Steelers season =

Pittsburgh Steelers 58th US football season

- Owner: The Rooney Family
- General manager: Dick Haley
- Head coach: Chuck Noll
- Offensive coordinator: Joe Walton
- Defensive coordinator: Dave Brazil
- Home stadium: Three Rivers Stadium

Results
- Record: 9–7
- Division place: 3rd AFC Central
- Playoffs: Did not qualify
- All-Pros: Rod Woodson (1st team)
- Pro Bowlers: 2: LB David Little; CB Rod Woodson
- Team MVP: Rod Woodson
- Team ROY: Eric Green

The 1990 Pittsburgh Steelers season was the franchise's 58th season as a professional sports franchise and as a member of the National Football League.

The Steelers did not score an offensive touchdown until the 5th game of the season, but did rebound to a 9–7 record (the same they posted the previous season).

Unlike the previous season, 9–7 was not enough to gain a playoff berth. The Steelers continued to show improvement overcoming a 1–3 start to find themselves in a showdown with the Oilers in Houston for the AFC's final playoff spot in the final game of the season. However, the Steelers were never in the game as the Oilers beat the Steelers 34–14 ending their season without the playoffs.

== Offseason ==
=== NFL draft ===
1990 Pittsburgh Steelers draft
Round	Pick	Player	Position	College	Notes
1	21	Eric Green *	Tight end	Liberty	
2	43	Kenny Davidson	Defensive end	LSU	
3	70	Neil O'Donnell *	Quarterback	Maryland	
3	81	Craig Veasey	Defensive tackle	Houston	
4	97	Chris Calloway	Wide receiver	Michigan	
5	128	Barry Foster *	Running back	Arkansas	
6	155	Ronald Heard	Wide receiver	Bowling Green	
7	182	Dan Grayson	Linebacker	Washington State	
8	209	Karl Dunbar	Defensive end	LSU	
9	239	Gary Jones	Safety	Texas A&M	
10	266	Eddie Miles	Linebacker	Minnesota	
11	293	Justin Strzelczyk	Guard	Maine	
12	319	Richard Bell	Running back	Nebraska	
Made roster * Made at least one Pro Bowl during career

=== Undrafted free agents ===
1990 undrafted free agents of note
Player	Position	College
Kimble Anders	Running back	Houston
Lorenzo Davis	Wide receiver	Youngstown State
Ron Fair	Wide receiver	Arizona State
Bob Gordon	Wide receiver	Nebraska-Omaha
Mitch Lee	Linebacker	Cornell
Mike Ober	Defensive tackle	Sam Houston State
Skip Pavlik	Guard	Virginia Tech
Pete Rutter	Punter	Baylor

== Personnel ==
=== Coaches / Staff ===
1990 Pittsburgh Steelers staff
Front office: President – Daniel M. Rooney; Vice president – John R. McGinley; Vice president – Arthur J. Rooney, Jr.; Director of communications – Joe Gordon; Controller – Ralph Meacham; Chief negotiator/travel – James A. Boston; Business/stadium coordinator – Dan Ferens; Public relations director – Dan Edwards; Community relations coordinator – Pat Hanlon; Ticket sales manager – Geraldine Glenn; Office manager/computer – Jim Ellenberger; Director of player personnel – Dick Haley; Director of pro personnel and development – Tom Donahoe; College scouting coordinator – Tom Modrak; Talent scout – Bob Schmitz; Talent scout – Max McCartney; Talent scout – Charles Bailey; Head coaches: Head coach – Chuck Noll; Offensive coaches: Offensive coordinator – Joe Walton; Offensive backfield – Dick Hoak; Receivers – Dwain Painter; Tight ends – Jon Kolb; Offensive line – Ron Blackledge	Defensive coaches: Defensive coordinator – Dave Brazil; Defensive line – Joe Greene; Linebackers – Bob Valesente; Defensive backs – John Fox; Special teams coaches: Special teams – George Stewart; Strength and conditioning: Conditioning coach – Jon Kolb; Dentist – Dr. George P. Boucek; Ophthalmologist – Dr. Phillip Buzzelli; Physician, orthopedic – Dr. Thomas W. Cowan; Neurological surgery consultant – Dr. Joseph C. Maroon; Physician, M.D. – Dr. Richard Rydze; Physician, consultant – Dr. Abraham J.Twerski; Physician, M.D. – Dr. Anthony P. Yates; Trainer – Ralph Berlin; Trainer – Fran Feld; Equipment manager – Anthony Parisi; Field manager – Rodgers Freyvogel; Video & film director – Bob McCartney; Video assistant – Pat Dolan; Photographers – Mike Fabus, Bill Amatucci

=== Final roster ===
1990 Pittsburgh Steelers roster
Quarterbacks (QB): 6 Bubby Brister; 14 Neil O'Donnell; 11 Rick Strom; Running backs (RB): 21 Richard Bell; 29 Barry Foster; 33 Merril Hoge FB; 42 Warren Williams; 38 Tim Worley; Wide receivers (WR): 88 Chris Calloway; 82 Derek Hill; 83 Louis Lipps; 20 Dwight Stone; Tight ends (TE): 86 Eric Green; 84 Mike Mularkey; 85 Terry O'Shea	Offensive linemen (OL): 60 Brian Blankenship G; 63 Dermontti Dawson C; 77 Carlton Haselrig G; 62 Tunch Ilkin T; 65 John Jackson T; 74 Terry Long G; 71 Tom Ricketts T; 79 John Rienstra G; 73 Justin Strzelczyk T; Defensive linemen (DL): 64 Kenny Davidson DE; 66 Donald Evans DE; 91 Craig Veasey NT; 98 Gerald Williams NT; 93 Keith Willis DE	Linebackers (LB): 53 Bryan Hinkle OLB; 99 A.J. Jenkins OLB; 50 David Little ILB; 95 Greg Lloyd OLB; 54 Hardy Nickerson ILB; 55 Jerry Olsavsky ILB; 90 Tyronne Stowe ILB; 57 Jerrol Williams OLB; Defensive backs (DB): 27 Thomas Everett FS; 22 Larry Griffin FS; 35 Delton Hall CB; 44 D. J. Johnson CB; 25 Gary Jones SS; 37 Carnell Lake SS; 49 Dwayne Woodruff CB; 26 Rod Woodson CB; Special teams (ST): 1 Gary Anderson K; 4 Dan Stryzinski P	Practice squad: 89 Lorenzo Davis WR; 80 Ron Fair WR; 24 Anthony Florence CB; 94 Eddie Miles LB; Reserve: 61 Gene Cullinane G; 96 Karl Dunbar DE (IR); 68 Lorenzo Freeman NT (IR); 97 Aaron Jones LB (IR); 51 Chuck Lanza C (IR); Rookies in italics 47 active, 4 reserve, 4 practice squad

== Preseason ==
Week	Date	Opponent	Result	Record	Venue
1	August 9	vs. New England Patriots	W 30–14	1–0	Olympic Stadium
2	August 17	at Washington Redskins	L 24–27	1–1	RFK Stadium
3	August 25	at Dallas Cowboys	L 9–20	1–2	Texas Stadium
4	September 1	Philadelphia Eagles	W 20–10	2–2	Three Rivers Stadium

== Regular season ==
=== Schedule ===
Week	Date	Opponent	Result	Record	Venue	Recap
1	September 9	at **Cleveland Browns**	**L** 3–13	0–1	Cleveland Municipal Stadium	Recap
2	September 16	**Houston Oilers**	**W** 20–9	1–1	Three Rivers Stadium	Recap
3	September 23	at Los Angeles Raiders	**L** 3–20	1–2	Los Angeles Memorial Coliseum	Recap
4	September 30	Miami Dolphins	**L** 6–28	1–3	Three Rivers Stadium	Recap
5	October 7	San Diego Chargers	**W** 36–14	2–3	Three Rivers Stadium	Recap
6	October 14	at Denver Broncos	**W** 34–17	3–3	Mile High Stadium	Recap
7	October 21	at San Francisco 49ers	**L** 7–27	3–4	Candlestick Park	Recap
8	October 29	Los Angeles Rams	**W** 41–10	4–4	Three Rivers Stadium	Recap
9	November 4	Atlanta Falcons	**W** 21–9	5–4	Three Rivers Stadium	Recap
10	November 11	Bye				
11	November 18	at **Cincinnati Bengals**	**L** 3–27	5–5	Riverfront Stadium	Recap
12	November 25	at New York Jets	**W** 24–7	6–5	Giants Stadium	Recap
13	December 2	**Cincinnati Bengals**	**L** 12–16	6–6	Three Rivers Stadium	Recap
14	December 9	New England Patriots	**W** 24–3	7–6	Three Rivers Stadium	Recap
15	December 16	at New Orleans Saints	**W** 9–6	8–6	Louisiana Superdome	Recap
16	December 23	**Cleveland Browns**	**W** 35–0	9–6	Three Rivers Stadium	Recap
17	December 30	at **Houston Oilers**	**L** 14–34	9–7	Astrodome	Recap
Note: Intra-division opponents are in **bold** text.

=== Game summaries ===
==== Week 1 (Sunday September 9, 1990): at Cleveland Browns ====
	1	2	3	4	Total
Steelers	0	3	0	0	**3**
**Browns**	0	0	10	3	**13**

at Cleveland Municipal Stadium, Cleveland, Ohio

- Game time: 4:00 pm EDT
- Game weather:
- Game attendance: 78,298
- Referee: Dick Hantak
- TV announcers: (NBC) Don Criqui (play by play), Bob Trumpy (color commentator)

Scoring drives:

- Pittsburgh – FG Anderson 19
- Cleveland – Blaylock 30 fumble return (Kauric kick)
- Cleveland – FG Kauric 28
- Cleveland – FG Kauric 47

==== Week 2 (Sunday September 16, 1990): vs. Houston Oilers ====
	1	2	3	4	Total
Oilers	0	7	2	0	**9**
**Steelers**	7	3	0	10	**20**

at Three Rivers Stadium, Pittsburgh, Pennsylvania

- Game time: 8:00 pm EDT
- Game weather: 56 °F (13 °C) (Cloudy)
- Game attendance: 54,814
- Referee: Gene Barth
- TV announcers: (TNT) Skip Caray (play by play), Pat Haden (color commentator)

Scoring drives:

- Pittsburgh – D. Johnson 26 interception return (Anderson kick)
- Houston – White 1 run (Zendejas kick)
- Pittsburgh – FG Anderson 31
- Houston – Safety, Childress tackled Brister in end zone
- Pittsburgh – FG Anderson 27
- Pittsburgh – Woodson 52 punt return (Anderson kick)

==== Week 3 (Sunday September 23, 1990): at Los Angeles Raiders ====
	1	2	3	4	Total
Steelers	3	0	0	0	**3**
**Raiders**	0	3	3	14	**20**

at Los Angeles Memorial Coliseum, Los Angeles, California

- Game time: 4:00 pm EDT
- Game weather:
- Game attendance: 50,657
- Referee: Howard Roe
- TV announcers: (NBC) Marv Albert (play by play), Paul Maguire (color commentator)

Scoring drives:

- Pittsburgh – FG Anderson 31
- Los Angeles Raiders – FG Jaeger 40
- Los Angeles Raiders – FG Jaeger 45
- Los Angeles Raiders – Allen 1 run (Jaeger kick)
- Los Angeles Raiders – Fernandez 66 pass from Schroeder (Jaeger kick)

==== Week 4 (Sunday September 30, 1990): vs. Miami Dolphins ====
	1	2	3	4	Total
**Dolphins**	7	14	0	7	**28**
Steelers	0	3	3	0	**6**

at Three Rivers Stadium, Pittsburgh, Pennsylvania

- Game time: 1:00 pm EDT
- Game weather: 57 °F (14 °C) (Cloudy)
- Game attendance: 54,691
- Referee: Gerald Austin
- TV announcers: (NBC) Marv Albert (play by play), Paul Maguire (color commentator)

Scoring drives:

- Miami – S. Smith 1 run (Stoyanovich kick)
- Miami – S. Smith 7 run (Stoyanovich kick)
- Clayton 35 pass from Marino (Stoyanovich kick)
- Pittsburgh – FG Anderson 46
- Pittsburgh – FG Anderson 35
- Miami – Paige 1 run (Stoyanovich kick)

==== Week 5 (Sunday October 7, 1990): vs. San Diego Chargers ====
	1	2	3	4	Total
Chargers	7	0	7	0	**14**
**Steelers**	3	14	7	12	**36**

at Three Rivers Stadium, Pittsburgh, Pennsylvania

- Game time: 1:00 pm EDT
- Game weather: 75 °F (24 °C) (Mostly Cloudy)
- Game attendance: 53,486
- Referee: Tom White
- TV announcers: (NBC) Joel Meyers (play by play), Ahmad Rashad (color commentator)

Scoring drives:

- Pittsburgh – FG Anderson 45
- San Diego – Plummer 2 pass from Tolliver (Reveiz kick)
- Pittsburgh – Green 8 pass from Brister (Anderson kick)
- Pittsburgh – Green 1 pass from Brister (Anderson kick)
- Pittsburgh – W. Williams 2 run (Anderson kick)
- San Diego – L. Miller fumble recovery in end zone (Reveiz kick)
- Pittsburgh – Safety, Stone blocked punt out of end zone
- Pittsburgh – FG Anderson 45
- Pittsburgh – Foster 2 run (Anderson kick)

==== Week 6 (Sunday October 14, 1990): at Denver Broncos ====
	1	2	3	4	Total
**Steelers**	0	14	7	13	**34**
Broncos	10	7	0	0	**17**

at Mile High Stadium, Denver, Colorado

- Game time: 4:00 pm EDT
- Game weather:
- Game attendance: 74,285
- Referee: Jerry Markbreit
- TV announcers: (NBC) Joel Meyers (play by play), Ahmad Rashad (color commentator)

Scoring drives:

- Denver – Winder 1 run (Treadwell kick)
- Denver – FG Treadwell 24
- Pittsburgh – Lipps 6 pass from Brister (Anderson kick)
- Denver – Sewell 2 run (Treadwell kick)
- Pittsburgh – Green 3 pass from Brister (Anderson kick)
- Pittsburgh – Hoge 6 run (Anderson kick)
- Pittsburgh – Green 10 pass from Brister (kick failed)
- Pittsburgh – Green 3 pass from Brister (Anderson kick)

==== Week 7 (Sunday October 21, 1990): at San Francisco 49ers ====
	1	2	3	4	Total
Steelers	7	0	0	0	**7**
**49ers**	0	10	10	7	**27**

at Candlestick Park, San Francisco, California

- Game time: 4:00 pm EDT
- Game weather:
- Game attendance: 64,301
- Referee: Jim Tunney
- TV announcers: (NBC) Dick Enberg (play by play), Bill Walsh (color commentator)

Scoring drives:

- Pittsburgh – Bell 2 pass from Brister (Anderson kick)
- San Francisco – FG Cofer 39
- San Francisco – Sherrard 5 pass from Montana (Cofer kick)
- San Francisco – FG Cofer 20
- San Francisco – Rathman 1 run (Cofer kick)
- San Francisco – Rathman 1 run (Cofer kick)

==== Week 8 (Monday October 29, 1990): vs. Los Angeles Rams ====
	1	2	3	4	Total
Rams	7	3	0	0	**10**
**Steelers**	14	3	10	14	**41**

at Three Rivers Stadium, Pittsburgh, Pennsylvania

- Game time: 9:00 pm EST
- Game weather: 39 °F (4 °C) (Clear)
- Game attendance: 56,466
- Referee: Dick Hantak
- TV announcers: (ABC) Al Michaels (play by play), Frank Gifford & Dan Dierdorf (color commentators)

Scoring drives:

- Los Angeles Rams – Greens 100 kickoff return (Lansford kick)
- Pittsburgh – Hoge 6 pass from Brister (Anderson kick)
- Pittsburgh – Green 17 pass from Brister (Anderson kick)
- Los Angeles Rams – FG Lansford 32
- Pittsburgh – FG Anderson 42
- Pittsburgh – FG Anderson 30
- Pittsburgh – Hoge 1 run (Anderson kick)
- Pittsburgh – Stone 8 pass from Brister (Anderson kick)
- Pittsburgh – Hoge 2 pass from Brister (Anderson kick)

==== Week 9 (Sunday November 4, 1990): vs. Atlanta Falcons ====
	1	2	3	4	Total
Falcons	6	3	0	0	**9**
**Steelers**	0	0	7	14	**21**

at Three Rivers Stadium, Pittsburgh, Pennsylvania

- Game time: 1:00 pm EST
- Game weather: 67 °F (19 °C) (Mostly Cloudy)
- Game attendance: 57,093
- Referee: Johnny Grier
- TV announcers: (CBS) Brad Nessler (play by play), Dan Jiggetts (color commentator)

Scoring drives:

- Atlanta – FG Davis 41
- Atlanta – FG Davis 43
- Atlanta – FG Davis 38
- Pittsburgh – Lipps 11 pass from Brister (Anderson kick)
- Pittsburgh – Mularkey 19 pass from Brister (Anderson kick)
- Pittsburgh – Williams 70 run (Anderson kick)

==== Week 11 (Sunday November 18, 1990): at Cincinnati Bengals ====
	1	2	3	4	Total
Steelers	0	0	0	3	**3**
**Bengals**	7	3	14	3	**27**

at Riverfront Stadium, Cincinnati, Ohio

- Game time: 8:00 pm EST
- Game weather:
- Game attendance: 60,064
- Referee: Tom Dooley
- TV announcers: (ESPN) Mike Patrick (play by play), Joe Theismann (color commentator)

Scoring drives:

- Cincinnati – Woods 5 run (Breech kick)
- Cincinnati – FG Breech 21
- Cincinnati – Taylor 1 run (Breech kick)
- CIncinnati – Bussey 70 fumble return (Breech kick)
- Pittsburgh – FG Anderson 31
- Cincinnati – FG Breech 33

==== Week 12 (Sunday November 25, 1990): at New York Jets ====
	1	2	3	4	Total
**Steelers**	0	7	3	14	**24**
Jets	0	7	0	0	**7**

at Giants Stadium, East Rutherford, New Jersey

- Game time: 4:00 pm EST
- Game weather:
- Game attendance: 57,806
- Referee: Bob McElwee
- TV announcers: (NBC) Marv Albert (play by play), Paul Maguire (color commentator)

Scoring drives:

- New York Jets – Moore 53 pass from O'Brien (Leahy kick)
- Pittsburgh – W. Williams 5 pass from Brister (Anderson kick)
- Pittsburgh – FG Anderson 33
- Pittsburgh – Hoge 1 run (Anderson kick)
- Pittsburgh – Lipps 3 pass from Brister (Anderson kick)

==== Week 13 (Sunday December 2, 1990): vs. Cincinnati Bengals ====
	1	2	3	4	Total
**Bengals**	7	9	0	0	**16**
Steelers	6	0	3	3	**12**

at Three Rivers Stadium, Pittsburgh, Pennsylvania

- Game time: 1:00 pm EST
- Game weather: 45 °F (7 °C) (Mostly Cloudy)
- Game attendance: 58,200
- Referee: Jerry Markbreit
- TV announcers: (NBC) Don Criqui (play by play), Bob Trumpy (color commentator)

Scoring drives:

- Pittsburgh – FG Anderson 32
- Cincinnati – Brown 50 pass from Esiason (Breech kick)
- Pittsburgh – FG Anderson 36
- Cincinnati – Safety, Francis tackled Brister in end zone
- Cincinnati – Brooks 7 run (Breech kick)
- Pittsburgh – FG Anderson 29
- Pittsburgh – FG Anderson 48

==== Week 14 (Sunday December 9, 1990): vs. New England Patriots ====
	1	2	3	4	Total
Patriots	0	3	0	0	**3**
**Steelers**	3	7	7	7	**24**

at Three Rivers Stadium, Pittsburgh, Pennsylvania

- Game time: 1:00 pm EST
- Game weather: 43 °F (6 °C) (Partly Cloudy)
- Game attendance: 48,354
- Referee: Dale Hamer
- TV announcers: (NBC) Tom Hammond (play by play), Joe Namath (color commentator)

Scoring drives:

- Pittsburgh – FG Anderson 42
- Pittsburgh – Hoge 8 run (Anderson kick)
- New England – FG Staurovsky 49
- Pittsburgh – Green 14 pass from Brister (Anderson kick)
- Pittsburgh – Hoge 41 run (Anderson kick)

==== Week 15 (Sunday December 16, 1990): at New Orleans Saints ====
	1	2	3	4	Total
**Steelers**	0	3	0	6	**9**
Saints	0	0	3	3	**6**

at Louisiana Superdome, New Orleans, Louisiana

- Game time: 1:00 pm EST
- Game weather: Dome
- Game attendance: 68,582
- Referee: Howard Roe
- TV announcers: (NBC) Marv Albert (play by play), Paul Maguire (color commentator)

Scoring drives:

- Pittsburgh – FG Anderson 29
- New Orleans – FG Andersen 50
- New Orleans – FG Andersen 43
- Pittsburgh – FG Anderson 42
- Pittsburgh – FG Anderson 43

==== Week 16 (Sunday December 23, 1990): vs. Cleveland Browns ====
	1	2	3	4	Total
Browns	0	0	0	0	**0**
**Steelers**	21	14	0	0	**35**

at Three Rivers Stadium, Pittsburgh, Pennsylvania

- Game time: 1:00 pm EST
- Game weather: 36 °F (2 °C) (Fog)
- Game attendance: 51,665
- Referee: Johnny Grier
- TV announcers: (NBC) Joel Meyers (play by play), Ahmad Rashad (color commentator)

Scoring drives:

- Pittsburgh – Mularkey 20 pass from Brister (Anderson kick)
- Pittsburgh – Calloway 20 pass from Brister (Anderson kick)
- Pittsburgh – Mularkey 2 pass from Brister (Anderson kick)
- Pittsburgh – Hoge 20 pass from Brister (Anderson kick)
- Pittsburgh – W. Williams 1 run (Anderson kick)

==== Week 17 (Sunday December 30, 1990): at Houston Oilers ====
	1	2	3	4	Total
Steelers	0	0	7	7	**14**
**Oilers**	7	17	7	3	**34**

at Astrodome, Houston, Texas

- Game time: 8:00 pm EST
- Game weather: Dome
- Game attendance: 56,906
- Referee: Gerald Austin
- TV announcers: (ESPN) Mike Patrick (play by play), Joe Theismann (color commentator), Gary Danielson (sideline)

Scoring drives:

- Houston – White 1 run (Garcia kick)
- Houston – Givins 14 pass from Carlson (Garcia kick)
- Houston – Hill 3 pass from Carlson (Garcia kick)
- Houston – FG Garcia 47
- Pittsburgh – Hoge 4 run (Anderson kick)
- Houston – Jeffires 53 pass from Carlson (Garcia kick)
- Pittsburgh – Hoge 3 run (Anderson kick)
- Houston – FG Garcia 45

=== Standings ===
AFC Central
	W	L	T	PCT	DIV	CONF	PF	PA	STK
^{(3)} Cincinnati Bengals	9	7	0	.563	5–1	8–4	360	352	W2
^{(6)} Houston Oilers	9	7	0	.563	4–2	8–4	405	307	W1
Pittsburgh Steelers	9	7	0	.563	2–4	6–6	292	240	L1
Cleveland Browns	3	13	0	.188	1–5	2–10	228	462	L2
