= 59th Grey Cup =

1971 Canadian Football championship game

Calgary Stampeders	Toronto Argonauts
(9–6–1)	(10–4)
14	11
Head coach: Jim Duncan	Head coach: Leo Cahill
	1	2	3	4	Total
Calgary Stampeders	7	7	0	0	14
Toronto Argonauts	0	3	8	0	11
- Date: November 28, 1971
- Stadium: Empire Stadium
- Location: Vancouver
- Most Valuable Player: Wayne Harris, LB (Stampeders)
- Most Valuable Canadian: Dick Suderman, DE (Stampeders)
- Attendance: 34,404

Broadcasters
- Network: CBC, CTV, SRC

The 59th Grey Cup was played on November 28, 1971, before 34,404 fans at Vancouver's Empire Stadium.

The Calgary Stampeders defeated the Toronto Argonauts on a slick, rain-covered field, 14–11.

== Box Score ==
First quarter

Calgary - TD - Herm Harrison 14 yard pass from Jerry Keeling (Larry Robinson convert)

Second quarter

Toronto - FG - Ivan MacMillan 11 yards
Calgary - TD - Jesse Mims 6 yard run (Larry Robinson convert)

Third quarter

Toronto - TD - Roger Scales 33 yard fumble return (lateral from Joe Vijuk) (Ivan MacMillan convert)
Toronto - Rouge - Ivan MacMillan 27 yard missed FG

Fourth quarter

No scoring

Teams	1 Q	2 Q	3 Q	4 Q	Total
Calgary Stampeders	7	7	0	0	14
Toronto Argonauts	0	3	8	0	11

== Background ==
The Argonauts had not appeared in a Grey Cup championship game since 1952. The Stampeders were making their third Grey Cup appearance in four years, but had not actually won a championship since 1948.

The 10-4 Argonauts faced the 9-6-1 Stampeders for the first time in the Grey Cup. Both teams finished in first place in their divisions, but Toronto, led by star rookie quarterback Joe Theismann, was the favourite. The 1971 Grey Cup was the first to be played on artificial turf (Tartan Turf).

== The game ==
Field conditions were poor, as a steady downpour left sheets of water over the artificial turf at Empire Stadium.

Calgary opened the scoring with Herm Harrison making an incredible one-handed grab of a Jerry Keeling pass in the end zone for a touchdown. Toronto countered with a big play, a 55-yard pass reception by fan favourite tight end Mel Profit, but would come away from this drive deep into Stampeder territory with only a field goal from Ivan McMillan.

Jesse Mims added another Stampeder major, ending the scoring for the half and for Calgary on the day.

The second half saw Joe Theismann replaced by Greg Barton, but the Argos could not move the ball. Their only touchdown came when sure-handed Calgary punt returner Jim Silye dropped a punt which was then recovered by Joe Vijuk. Vijuk had the presence of mind to lateral to Roger Scales, who ran 33 yards for the touchdown.

Late in the fourth quarter Dick Thornton, a great two-way player who had already made a fantastic reception, intercepted a Calgary pass and returned it to the Stampeder 11-yard line. Theismann, now back in the game, handed the ball off to Leon McQuay, the Argonauts' star running back. As McQuay cut left, he promptly slipped on the soggy turf and fumbled the ball, which was recovered by Stampeder Reggie Holmes. To this day, there is still some dispute about this play, as McQuay dropped the ball when his elbow hit the ground and he had not been contacted by a Stampeder defender, thus bringing up the football adage that "the ground can't cause a fumble."

Nevertheless, Toronto still had a chance to pull out a victory. With 1:53 left in the game and Calgary deep in their own end, they punted on third down. Argo returner Harry Abofs, in an effort to capture the wet ball, accidentally kicked it out of bounds while reaching down. CFL rules state that when a ball is kicked out of bounds, possession goes to the opposing team, thus giving Calgary possession once again. Had Abofs knocked the ball out of bounds with his hand, Toronto would have had one last offensive series. Instead, Calgary ran out the clock and captured the 1971 Grey Cup.

== Legacy ==
Argonaut coach Leo Cahill, who won the 1971 Coach of the Year award, would later say, "When Leon (McQuay) slipped, I fell." He was fired in 1972 after the team, beset by injuries, stumbled to a 3-11 finish. He would return to coach the Argos in 1977, but was fired midway through the 1978 season.

Jim Silye was later a Member of Parliament for Calgary.

Dick Suderman, the first recipient of the newly created Most Valuable Canadian award for the game, died the following year and the trophy was renamed in his honour.

The 1971 Argonaut team was the focus of an episode of Engraved on a Nation.

This was the first Grey Cup game to be played on a Sunday on a permanent basis; the first such game to be played in full on a Sunday came two years earlier.

== Videos ==
- Entire game on YouTube
