= Jerry Keeling =

American gridiron football player (1939–2018)

No. 10, 14
- Positions: Quarterback, defensive back

Personal information
- Born: August 2, 1939; Paris, Texas, U.S.
- Died: January 20, 2018 (aged 78); Tulsa, Oklahoma, U.S.
- Listed height: 6 ft 1 in (1.85 m)
- Listed weight: 175 lb (79 kg)

Career information
- College: Tulsa

Career history
- 1961–1972: Calgary Stampeders
- 1973–1975: Ottawa Rough Riders
- 1975: Hamilton Tiger-Cats

Awards and highlights
- 2× Grey Cup champion (1971, 1973); 3× CFL All-Star (1964, 1965, 1967); 5× CFL West All-Star (1964–1968)
- Canadian Football Hall of Fame (Class of 1989)

Jerry Keeling (August 2, 1939 – January 20, 2018) was an American professional football quarterback and defensive back in the Canadian Football League (CFL), playing fifteen seasons from 1961 to 1975 for the Calgary Stampeders, Ottawa Rough Riders, and Hamilton Tiger-Cats. He became a member of the Canadian Football Hall of Fame in 1989.

== Professional career ==
=== Calgary Stampeders ===
The Paris, Texas-born Enid, Oklahoma-reared Keeling was a member of the Stampeders from 1961 to 1972, playing defensive back and quarterback positions. It was only in 1969 that Keeling became the starting quarterback. Keeling was the winning quarterback in the 1970 Western Conference finals in a best of 3 series against the Saskatchewan Roughriders, the final game in brutally cold weather (see video clip below) won by Calgary by a score of 15–14, one of the coldest football games ever.

But the team lost the 58th Grey Cup game played on a very muddy field to the Montreal Alouettes. However, after beating Saskatchewan again in the Western Conference finals in 1971, he beat the Toronto Argonauts during the rainy 59th Grey Cup game, his first championship victory.

=== Ottawa Rough Riders ===
Keeling became an Ottawa Rough Rider from 1973 to 1975. In 1973, he was their starting quarterback and led his team to the 61st Grey Cup. However, he was replaced by Rick Cassata in the title game because of an injury. Ottawa won that game, Keeling's second and last Grey Cup win.

=== Hamilton Tiger-Cats ===
He ended his career in 1975 as the starting quarterback of the Hamilton Tiger-Cats, which finished 5–10–1 yet made the playoffs, though defeated on the first round by the Alouettes.

== Coaching ==
Keeling was an assistant coach for the Stampeders from 1982 to 1983.

== Death ==
Keeling died on Saturday, January 20, 2018. At the time of his death he was living in Oklahoma with his wife Vella.
