= 64th Grey Cup =

1976 Canadian Football championship game

Ottawa Rough Riders	Saskatchewan Roughriders
(9–6–1)	(11–5)
23	20
Head coach: George Brancato	Head coach: John Payne
	1	2	3	4	Total
Ottawa Rough Riders	10	0	3	10	23
Saskatchewan Roughriders	0	17	3	0	20
- Date: November 28, 1976
- Stadium: Exhibition Stadium
- Location: Toronto
- Most Valuable Player: Offence: Tom Clements, QB (Rough Riders); Defence: Cleveland Vann, LB (Roughriders)
- Most Valuable Canadian: Tony Gabriel, TE (Rough Riders)
- National anthem: Ginette Reno
- Attendance: 53,467

Broadcasters
- Network: CBC, CTV, SRC

The 64th Grey Cup was played on November 28, 1976, at Exhibition Stadium in Toronto. The Ottawa Rough Riders defeated the Saskatchewan Roughriders 23–20 in what is considered one of the most thrilling Grey Cup games, featuring some of the most exciting plays in Grey Cup history.

The attendance was 53,467—at the time, a Grey Cup record—due to the recently completed stadium reconfiguration to accommodate the Toronto Blue Jays, a Major League Baseball expansion team that commenced play the following year. Toronto's Grey Cup attendance record would last but one season before being broken by the 65th Grey Cup at Olympic Stadium in Montreal.

== Scoring ==
Ottawa Rough Riders - 23
Touchdowns - Tony Gabriel and Bill Hatanaka
Field goals - Gerry Organ (3)
Converts - Gerry Organ (2)

Saskatchewan Roughriders - 20
Touchdowns - Steve Mazurak and Bob Richardson
Field goals - Bob Macoritti (2)
Converts - Bob Macoritti (2)

== Game summary ==
After an early field goal, Ottawa increased their lead in record-setting fashion, with Bill Hatanaka (a York University graduate who would later attend Harvard University) returning a punt for a 79-yard touchdown (then a CFL record). Ottawa led 10–0 at the end of the first quarter.

Saskatchewan owned the second quarter. CFL legend Ron Lancaster hit Steve Mazurak and Bob Richardson with touchdown passes and Bob Macoritti added a field goal. On defence, all-star Ted Provost intercepted a Tom Clements pass to set up a touchdown and middle linebacker Cleveland Vann covered the field with his excellent play. Unfortunately, Saskatchewan were without their longtime star running back, George Reed, who had retired after the previous season, and his talented replacement, Molly McGee, left the game with an injury. The halftime score was 17–10 in favour of Saskatchewan.

The teams traded field goals in the third quarter, but the quarter also included its share of dramatic moments such as Gerry Organ's 52-yard run on a fake punt and the subsequent interception by Saskatchewan's Cleveland Vann.

Ottawa kicked another field goal in the fourth quarter, making the score 20–16. A later drive stalled on a goal-line stand by Saskatchewan. With time running out, Ottawa found themselves on the Saskatchewan 24-yard-line with 20 seconds left. Ottawa quarterback (and Notre Dame University grad) Tom Clements waved off the play from the bench. Canadian Football Hall of Fame tight end Tony Gabriel headed towards the end zone, faked a post pattern and turned to the corner. Saskatchewan DB Ted Provost fell for the fake and Gabriel hauled in Clements' pass, with Provost and Ray Odums in vain pursuit. The play was spectacular in its execution, its game-winning importance and in the dramatic manner in which it unfolded, and is often simply referred to as "The Catch."

== Trivia ==
- All the points in this game were scored by Canadians.
- This was the last Grey Cup championship for the Ottawa Rough Riders (the team folded in 1996) and the last playoff game for the Saskatchewan Roughriders until 1988. The 1976 victory was the last major sports championship of any kind for Ottawa until the Ottawa Redblacks (the third CFL franchise to play in the city) won the 104th Grey Cup in 2016. In total, Ottawa's championship drought would last for 27 seasons of CFL play and 40 years altogether.
- This was the last "Rough Riders vs. Roughriders" Grey Cup match-up.
- The game-winning ball caught by Tony Gabriel ended up in the possession of Bruce Crete, who was 12 at the time. He and the other neighbourhood children played football with it until it wore out six years later.
- The 1976 game was only Grey Cup game between 1973 and 1982 that the Edmonton Eskimos did not appear in, having been defeated by Saskatchewan in the Western Conference Final game.
- Beginning this year, and up until 1982, the Grey Cup game would be held in alternating years in either Toronto (CNE Stadium) or Montreal (Olympic Stadium). This practice would finally end following the completion of BC Place in Vancouver in 1983.
