= Mike Law (Canadian football) =

Canadian football player (1942–2021)

Profile
- Position: Defensive back

Personal information
- Born: March 9, 1942
- Died: February 21, 2021 (aged 78); St. Margarets Bay, Nova Scotia, Canada
- Listed height: 5 ft 11 in (1.80 m)
- Listed weight: 175 lb (79 kg)

Career information
- College: Queen's

Career history
- 1967: Hamilton Tiger-Cats
- 1967–1972: Edmonton Eskimos
- 1972: Winnipeg Blue Bombers
- 1973: Ottawa Rough Riders

Awards and highlights
- Grey Cup champion (1973)

Mike Law (March 9, 1942 – February 21, 2021) was a Grey Cup champion defensive back in the Canadian Football League (CFL).

A Queen's Golden Gael, Law started with the Hamilton Tiger-Cats in 1967 but played 6 seasons with the Edmonton Eskimos, where he scored 2 touchdowns (on a fumble and interception) and picked off 5 passes (4 in 1971.) After a year with the Winnipeg Blue Bombers he finished his career with the 1973 Grey Cup champion Ottawa Rough Riders.
