= Mike Blum =

Canadian football linebacker (1942–2008)

No. 70
- Position: Linebacker

Personal information
- Born: October 24, 1942; Ottawa, Ontario, Canada
- Died: December 16, 2008 (aged 66); Toronto, Ontario, Canada
- Listed height: 6 ft 0 in (1.83 m)
- Listed weight: 225 lb (102 kg)

Career information
- College: Northern Michigan

Career history
- 1964–1967: Ottawa Rough Riders
- 1968–1970: Toronto Argonauts
- 1971–1972: Hamilton Tiger-Cats
- 1973–1974: Toronto Argonauts

Awards and highlights
- Grey Cup champion (1972); 2× CFL East All-Star (1967, 1971)

Mike Blum (October 24, 1942 – December 16, 2008) was a Canadian professional football player in the Canadian Football League. He played five seasons for the Toronto Argonauts between 1968 and 1974, and in 1972 earned a Grey Cup ring with the Hamilton Tiger-Cats. He died of a cerebral hemorrhage in Toronto on December 15, 2008
