= Gerry Sternberg =

Canadian football player (born 1943)

Profile
- Positions: Halfback, Defensive back

Personal information
- Born: March 18, 1943 (age 83); Orsk, Soviet Union
- Listed height: 5 ft 10 in (1.78 m)
- Listed weight: 175 lb (79 kg)

Career information
- University: Toronto
- CFL draft: 1965: 2nd round, 12th overall pick

Career history
- 1966–1967: Montreal Alouettes
- 1969–1971: Toronto Argonauts
- 1971–1972: Hamilton Tiger-Cats
- 1973: Toronto Argonauts

Awards and highlights
- Grey Cup champion (1972)

Gerald Sternberg (born March 18, 1943) is a former Canadian football player who played for the Montreal Alouettes, Toronto Argonauts and Hamilton Tiger-Cats. He won the Grey Cup with Hamilton in 1972. He played college football at the University of Toronto.

Sternberg was the original Vanier Cup most valuable player, being awarded the Ted Morris Memorial Trophy for the Toronto Varsity Blues 14-7 victory over the Alberta Golden Bears in the 1st Vanier Cup.
