= Grady Cavness =

American football player (born 1947)

No. 40, 32
- Position: Defensive back

Personal information
- Born: March 1, 1947 (age 79); Houston, Texas, U.S.
- Listed height: 5 ft 11 in (1.80 m)
- Listed weight: 187 lb (85 kg)

Career information
- High school: Jack Yates (Houston)
- College: UTEP
- NFL draft: 1969: 2nd round, 36th overall pick

Career history
- Denver Broncos (1969); Atlanta Falcons (1970); Winnipeg Blue Bombers (1972–1973); BC Lions (1974–1978)

Career NFL/AFL statistics
- Interceptions: 2
- Fumble recoveries: 2
- Stats at Pro Football Reference

Grady Cavness (born March 1, 1947) is an American former professional football player who was a defensive back in the American Football League (AFL), National Football League (NFL) and Canadian Football League (CFL). He played college football for the UTEP Miners. Cavness played in the AFL for the Denver Broncos in 1969 and for the NFL's Atlanta Falcons in 1970. He later joined the CFL and played for the Winnipeg Blue Bombers from 1972 to 1973 and for the BC Lions from 1974 to 1978.

His son, also named Grady Cavness, was an All-SWC college football player for Texas, went to training camp with the Houston Oilers and then spend two seasons in the CFL.
