= Lorne Richardson =

Canadian gridiron football player (born 1950)

Profile
- Position: Defensive back

Personal information
- Born: March 9, 1950 (age 76); Moose Jaw, Saskatchewan, Canada
- Listed height: 6 ft 0 in (1.83 m)
- Listed weight: 185 lb (84 kg)

Career information
- College: Colorado

Career history
- 1973–1976: Saskatchewan Roughriders
- 1977: Toronto Argonauts

Awards and highlights
- 4× CFL All-Star (1973, 1974, 1975, 1976); 4× CFL West All-Star (1973, 1974, 1975, 1976); Dr. Beattie Martin Trophy (1973)

Lorne Richardson (born March 9, 1950) is a former award-winning and all-star defensive back who played in the Canadian Football League from 1973 to 1977. Though his career may have been short, Richardson is considered one of the finest Canadian-born players to play defensive back ever in the CFL.

A native of Moose Jaw and a graduate of University of Colorado, Richardson took the league by storm in 1973 with 7 interceptions and 152 return yards. He was a CFL All-Star and winner of the Dr. Beattie Martin Trophy for rookie of the year in the west (and was runner up to Johnny Rodgers for the CFL's Most Outstanding Rookie Award.) He was a CFL All-Star in each of his first 4 seasons, intercepting 21 passes, and played in the classic 64th Grey Cup when the Green Riders lost in the last minute. He finished his career in 1977 with the Toronto Argonauts, playing 16 regular season and 1 playoff game, and intercepting 1 pass.
