= Roger Scales =

Canadian gridiron football player (born 1944)

Profile
- Position: Guard

Personal information
- Born: November 25, 1944 (age 81); Vernon, British Columbia, Canada
- Listed height: 6 ft 1 in (1.85 m)
- Listed weight: 240 lb (109 kg)

Career information
- College: BYU

Career history
- 1969–1972: Toronto Argonauts
- 1972–1977: Edmonton Eskimos

Awards and highlights
- Grey Cup champion (1975)

Roger Scales (born November 25, 1944) is a retired Canadian football player who played for the Edmonton Eskimos and Toronto Argonauts of the Canadian Football League (CFL). He played college football at Brigham Young University.

Scales is famous in Argonaut lore for scoring their only touchdown in the 1971 Grey Cup. On a fumbled punt by Calgary's Jim Silye, he received a lateral from Joe Vijuk and rumbled 33 yards into the end zone. The Argos eventually lost the game, the final score was 14-11.
