= Clyde Williams (guard) =

American football player (1940-2019)

No. 68
- Position: Guard

Personal information
- Born: July 27, 1940 (age 86); Shreveport, Louisiana, U.S.
- Died: February 25, 2019 (aged 78)
- Listed height: 6 ft 3 in (1.91 m)
- Listed weight: 250 lb (113 kg)

Career information
- High school: Minden
- College: Southern
- NFL draft: 1964: undrafted

Career history
- Minnesota Vikings (1964)*; Charleston Rockets (1965-1966); St. Louis Cardinals (1967–1970); New England Patriots (1973)*; Shreveport Steamer (1974-1975)
- * Offseason or practice squad member only

Career NFL statistics
- Games played: 50
- Games started: 25
- Stats at Pro Football Reference

Clyde Allen Williams Sr. (July 27, 1940-February 25, 2019) was an American former professional football player who was a guard for the St. Louis Cardinals of National Football League (NFL). He played college football for the Southern University. His Nephews Brock and John Williams were also played in the NFL.
