= Ivan MacMillan =

Canadian football player (born 1952)

Profile
- Position: Kicker

Personal information
- Born: February 8, 1952 (age 74); Alexandria, Ontario
- Listed height: 5 ft 8 in (1.73 m)
- Listed weight: 157 lb (71 kg)

Career history
- 1970: Ottawa Rough Riders
- 1971–1972: Toronto Argonauts
- 1973–1975: BC Lions
- 1975: Saskatchewan Roughriders

Ivan MacMillan (born February 8, 1952) is a retired Canadian football player who played for the Ottawa Rough Riders, Toronto Argonauts, BC Lions and Saskatchewan Roughriders. He played junior football in Ottawa.
