= Ted Collins (Canadian football) =

Canadian gridiron football player (1943–2021)

Profile
- Positions: Guard, Defensive tackle

Personal information
- Born: January 2, 1943; Windsor, Ontario
- Died: March 11, 2021 (aged 78)
- Listed height: 6 ft 0 in (1.83 m)
- Listed weight: 265 lb (120 kg)

Career information
- College: Detroit

Career history
- 1965–1967: Ottawa Rough Riders
- 1968–1969: Winnipeg Blue Bombers
- 1970–1972: Montreal Alouettes

Awards and highlights
- Grey Cup champion (1970)

Edward "Ted" Collins (January 2, 1943 – March 11, 2021) was a Canadian professional football player who played for the Winnipeg Blue Bombers, Montreal Alouettes and Ottawa Rough Riders. He won the Grey Cup with Montreal in 1970. He played college football at the University of Detroit Mercy. His brother Doug Collins also played in the CFL.
