= Johnny Counts =

American gridiron football player (1939–2004)

Profile
- Position: RB

Personal information
- Born: February 28, 1939; Mount Pleasant, New York, U.S.
- Died: February 21, 2004 (aged 64); Newburgh, New York, U.S.
- Listed height: 5 ft 10 in (1.78 m)
- Listed weight: 170 lb (77 kg)

Career information
- College: Illinois
- AFL draft: 1962: 24th round, 189th overall pick

Career history
- 1962–63: New York Giants
- 1964–65: Hamilton Tiger-Cats
- 1966: Toronto Argonauts

Awards and highlights
- Grey Cup champion (1965)
- Stats at Pro Football Reference

Johnny E. Counts Jr. (February 28, 1939 – February 21, 2004) was an American professional football player and running back in the National Football League (NFL) and the Canadian Football League (CFL).

== Education and career ==
Counts was an All-County running back at New Rochelle High School in 1957. He attended the University of Illinois, where he was selected as a Big Ten "Sophomore of the Year" in 1960.

In the 1962 NFL draft he was selected in round 24 and 189th overall by the New York Giants.

He also played in the Canadian Football League for the Hamilton Tiger-Cats and Toronto Argonauts. He played with the Tiger-Cats from 1964 to 1965, during which he scored a touchdown in the 52nd Grey Cup, in which the BC Lions beat Hamilton 34–24. 53rd Grey Cup champion (1965) He played for the Argonauts in 1966.
