= Walt Bilicki =

Canadian football player

Profile
- Positions: Guard, Linebacker

Personal information
- Born: May 1, 1936 (age 90); Montreal, Quebec, Canada
- Listed height: 5 ft 10 in (1.78 m)
- Listed weight: 205 lb (93 kg)

Career history
- 1956–1960: Winnipeg Blue Bombers
- 1961–1965: BC Lions

Awards and highlights
- Grey Cup champion (1958, 1959, 1964)

Walt Bilicki (born May 1, 1936) is a Canadian former professional football player who played for the Winnipeg Blue Bombers and BC Lions as a center, guard, and linebacker. Bilicki played for Winnipeg in the first five years of his career and then for BC in the final five years. He intercepted one pass as a linebacker, in 1964, when BC won the 52nd Grey Cup. He also played on Grey Cup winning teams for Winnipeg in 1958 and 1959.
