= 1972 Hamilton Tiger-Cats season =

Season of Canadian Football League team the Hamilton Tiger-Cats

- Head coach: Jerry Williams
- Home stadium: Ivor Wynne Stadium

Results
- Record: 11–3
- Division place: 1st, East
- Playoffs: Won Grey Cup
- Team MOP: Garney Henley
- Team MOC: Tony Gabriel
- Team MOR: Chuck Ealey

Uniform

The 1972 Hamilton Tiger-Cats season was the 15th season for the team in the Canadian Football League (CFL) and their 23rd overall. The Tiger-Cats finished in first place in the Eastern Conference with an 11–3 record and won the Grey Cup over the Saskatchewan Roughriders. Ralph Sazio became Tiger-Cats President in 1972, the year in which Hamilton hosted and won the Grey Cup. In 1972, Tony Gabriel improved his receiving numbers to 49 catches for 733 yards, finishing second in the East in passes caught. It would be Tommy Joe Coffey's final season with the Tiger-Cats. Ellison Kelly would be in his final season with the Tiger-Cats. During his 13-year career, he never missed a game, playing in 175 consecutive regular season games. Joe Zuger left the Tiger-Cats to play for the Detroit Lions of the NFL.

== Regular season ==
=== Season standings ===
Eastern Football Conference
Team	GP	W	L	T	PF	PA	Pts
Hamilton Tiger-Cats	14	11	3	0	372	262	22
Ottawa Rough Riders	14	11	3	0	298	228	22
Montreal Alouettes	14	4	10	0	246	353	8
Toronto Argonauts	14	3	11	0	254	298	6

=== Season schedule ===
Week	Game	Date	Opponent	Results		Venue	Attendance
Week	Game	Date	Opponent	Score	Record	Venue	Attendance
1	1	July 31	vs. Saskatchewan Roughriders	W 20–17	1–0		
2	2	Aug 8	at BC Lions	L 17–19	1–1		
2	3	Aug 11	at Edmonton Eskimos	L 27–30	1–2		
3	4	Aug 19	vs. Montreal Alouettes	L 23–25	1–3		
4	5	Aug 24	at Montreal Alouettes	W 25–12	2–3		
5	6	Sept 4	vs. Ottawa Rough Riders	W 17–16	3–3		
6	7	Sept 10	at Toronto Argonauts	W 22–18	4–3		
7	8	Sept 16	at Ottawa Rough Riders	W 30–22	5–3		
8	9	Sept 24	vs. Toronto Argonauts	W 41–14	6–3		
9	10	Oct 1	at Ottawa Rough Riders	W 25–20	7–3		
10	11	Oct 7	vs. Calgary Stampeders	W 50–24	8–3		
11	12	Oct 14	at Montreal Alouettes	W 31–26	9–3		
12	13	Oct 21	vs. Winnipeg Blue Bombers	W 18–3	10–3		
14	14	Nov 5	vs. Toronto Argonauts	W 26–16	11–3		

== Post-season ==
Round	Date	Opponent	Results		Venue	Attendance
Round	Date	Opponent	Score	Record	Venue	Attendance
Eastern Final #1	Nov 18	at Ottawa Rough Riders	L 7–19	0–1		
Eastern Final #2	Nov 26	vs. Ottawa Rough Riders	W 23–8	1–1		
Grey Cup	Dec 3	vs. Saskatchewan Roughriders	W 13–10	2–1		

=== Grey Cup ===
Teams	1 Q	2 Q	3 Q	4 Q	Final
Hamilton Tiger-Cats	10	0	0	3	13
Saskatchewan Roughriders	0	10	0	0	10

== Awards and honours ==
- CFL's Most Outstanding Player Award – Garney Henley (WR)
- CFL's Most Outstanding Rookie Award – Chuck Ealey (QB)
- Grey Cup's Most Valuable Player, Chuck Ealey (QB)
- Grey Cup's Most Valuable Canadian, Ian Sunter (K)
