= John Muir High School =

John Muir High School Early College Magnet

Location
- 1905 Lincoln Avenue; Pasadena, California 91103; United States; 34.178513°N 118.159871°W

Information
- Type: Public
- Motto: "The Home of the Mighty Mustangs"
- Established: 1926
- Principal: Lawton Gray
- Teaching staff: 51.83 (FTE)
- Grades: 9-12
- Enrollment: 1,133 (2023-2024)
- Student to teacher ratio: 21.86
- Colors: Blue and Gold
- Athletics conference: CIF Southern Section Pacific League
- Mascot: The Mustang
- Rival: Pasadena High School
- Accreditation: WASC
- Website: muir.pusd.us

John Muir High School is a four-year comprehensive secondary school in Pasadena, California, United States and is a part of the Pasadena Unified School District. The school is named after preservationist John Muir.

== History ==
In 1926, the Pasadena Unified School District constructed a second high school in the northwest corner of the city. The school was named John Muir Technical High School and though majority White, it served a growing community of Black, Japanese-American, and Mexican-American students. In 1938, the school was converted into a junior college and renamed Pasadena Junior College West. It closed during WW2 and was used by the US Army as a Training School.

Muir re-opened as John Muir Junior College in 1947. The school combined the last two years of high school with a full junior college curriculum. In the fall semester of 1954, the school changed again to its present John Muir High School, a full four-year high school.

Before 1964, many White students from the community of La Cañada Flintridge, California joined those from the Black neighborhood of northwest Pasadena and the racially mixed community of Altadena, and enrollment was nearly 3,000 students. In 1963, La Cañada Flintridge built its own high school and removed its students, except for those who would graduate in 1964. Shortly after that, the Pasadena City School District created Blair High School, siphoning off another large portion of the school's population.

In 2000, a teacher, Cyrus Javaheri, pleaded guilty to engaging in group sex with minors. The teacher lured two students from the school in addition to another minor through the internet. Furthermore, numerous instances of cyber sex were conducted between the teacher and various minors as young as 12.

In 2002, Caucasian teacher Scott Phelps was the center of controversy when he said that the majority of the students who were failing and disruptive were black.

But overwhelmingly, the students whose behavior makes the hallways deafening, who yell out for the teacher and demand immediate attention in class, who cannot seem to stop chatting and are fascinated by each other and relationships but not with academics, in short, whose behavior saps the strength and energy of us that are at the front lines, are African American.

Opinion was divisive with whites and blacks from the community on both sides. While some students and teachers defended his assertion that the majority of the underperforming students were black was accurate, others took offense to it. Subsequently, he was placed on administrative leave but allowed to return to the school a few days later. In 2005, Phelps was elected to a four-year term on Pasadena Unified School District Board of Trustees, where he remains as of 2018. In 2022, as the PUSD election season started, Phelps says that he “doesn’t want to seek re-election”

On February 7, 2025, students at John Muir High School staged a walkout alongside four other nearby high schools.

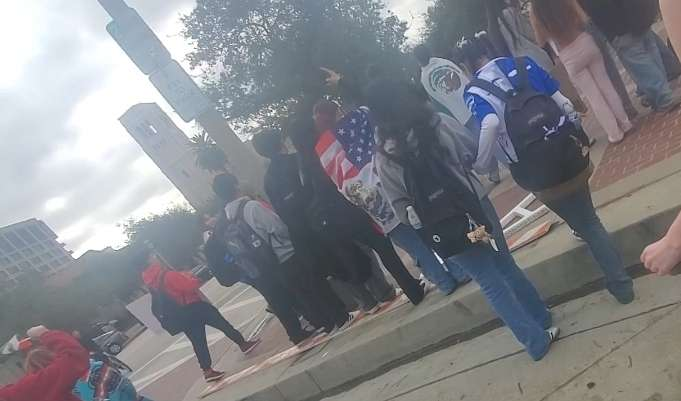
Photograph of students from John Muir High School arriving at Pasadena City Hall during the Dena Against I.C.E. Walkout, a student-led walkout protest that multiple high schools across Pasadena, California participated in.

Centennial celebration (2026)

In 2026, John Muir High School commemorates its 100th anniversary with a series of activities celebrating the school's history, alumni, and contributions to the Pasadena community. A centennial celebration is scheduled for November 1, 2026. The John Muir High School Alumni Association also launched a fundraising initiative to establish a $100,000 Centennial Legacy Fund supporting student scholarships, emergency assistance, and educational opportunities.

== Reinvention effort ==
For several years, Muir High School was under state monitoring. In October 2007, the PUSD Board of Education approved the reconstitution of John Muir High School for the 2008-2009 school year. The district worked with parents, staff, local businesses, and other community members to develop a reconstitution plan, which later became known as Muir's "reinvention" plan. The reform effort soon received support from ConnectEd, an organization partnering with the Irvine Foundation to implement Linked Learning in districts across California. The focus was a reform plan that included the re-vamping of the academic structure to include College and Career Pathways (Linked Learning), professional development, extensive community support, and requiring all teachers and staff to re-apply for their jobs.

John Muir High School's implementation of the Linked Learning reform effort was featured in an extensive two-year study by Stanford Center for Opportunity Policy in Education (SCOPE). According to the SCOPE study, "by many accounts, in just 3 years, Muir High School has, in fact, very credibly demonstrated the success of the Linked Learning model. The school has evolved from a traditional, comprehensive high school to a campus with three Linked Learning pathways that offer an integrated curriculum, authentic learning experiences, and personalized support for students. Early indications are that Muir, still with more than 90% of its students identifying as either African American or Latino, has made impressive gains during the initial years of implementation of Linked Learning. Among the gains is a dramatic reduction in dropouts over the last two years (from a 34% dropout rate to a 9% dropout rate). In addition, Muir's Academic Performance Index has steadily risen since the 2007-2008 school year for the school as a whole as well as for significant subgroups. This represents the fastest rate of increase of all the high schools in PUSD during that period" According to the district website, as a result of the reinvention effort, John Muir High School has achieved a 57-point increase on its Academic Performance Index since 2007. In the 2012-2013 school year, the dropout rate decreased again to 7.8%.

== Muir Ranch ==
From 2011 to 2018, a team of volunteer teachers and students began converting 1.5 acres of the John Muir High School campus into an urban farm. Muir Ranch grows a variety of flowers, vegetables, and fruits. Students can complete community service or internship graduation requirements by enrolling in classes at the Ranch. Muir Ranch also provides paid internships to students, which are funded by private donations, special events, farmer's market sales, and subscriptions to the Produce Box Program (CSA).

== Documentary ==
In 2019, filmmaker and Muir Alumnus Pablo Miralles completed a film about John Muir High School called, Can We All Get Along? Stories of Integration from John Muir High School. The movie contains the stories of alumni, parents, teachers and administrators from over 80 years at the Northwest school, from its traditionally black, Mexican-American, Japanese-American, and white - base when "naturally" integrated, to busing and finally to its current "resegregation" into an almost entirely Latino and black campus.

== Athletics ==
In 2012, Muir football cornerback Kevon Seymour was signed by the University of Southern California. He was ranked as the #15 cornerback in the United States by ESPN.

=== Turkey Tussle ===
The Annual Turkey Tussle Football Game tradition began in 1947 when the game was played between Pasadena Community College and John Muir Junior College. The two schools played until 1953. In 1954, the annual rivalry was played between what is now Pasadena High School and John Muir High School and is normally held at the Rose Bowl Stadium. Muir has won the Turkey Tussle for the past 16 years.

In September 2026, the annual Turkey Tussle football game between John Muir High School and longtime rival Pasadena High School was canceled after Pasadena High forfeited its remaining varsity games due to player safety concerns, injuries, and roster losses. Pasadena High then transitioned to a junior varsity schedule, leaving Muir as the only Pasadena Unified School District high school with an active varsity football program. The cancellation also affected a longstanding community tradition, with proceeds from the annual rivalry game historically supporting student government and other athletic programs at both schools.

== Notable alumni ==
=== John Muir Technical High School (1926-38) ===
- Jackie Robinson (1936), first black major league baseball player
- Mack Robinson (1932), 1936 Olympic Silver Medalist

=== John Muir Junior College (1947-54) ===
- John Van de Kamp (1952), Attorney General of California (1982–1991).

=== John Muir High School (1954–present) ===
- Waraire Boswell, (1993), Professional Fashion Designer
- Mary Akor, Nigerian-American long-distance runner
- Stacey Augmon (1986), basketball player, NBA and Olympics
- John Beal (1964), film and trailer music composer, live to film concert conductor, and former Vietnam War and Marine Corps military veteran.
- Richard Bell (1984), NFL player for the Pittsburgh Steelers
- Richard Bellis (1964), film and television music composer, former CLGA president, former ATAS governor, USC lecturer, musical director and former actor
- Alice Brown (1978), track and field Olympic gold medalist
- Chad Brown (1988), Pittsburgh Steelers, and Seattle Seahawks
- Tim Buchanan (1965), NFL player
- Dave Buchanan (1967), NFL, CFL, & WFL
- Calen Bullock (2021), college football safety for the USC Trojans
- Julie Bunn (1975), legislator, Minnesota House of Representatives (2007-current)
- Octavia Butler (1965), science fiction author
- Steven Clarke (1966), biochemist and pioneer in aging research
- Andre Coleman (1982), American author, screenwriter, and award-winning reporter
- Roger Dawson (1958), jazz and salsa musician, New York deejay
- Kenturah Davis, American contemporary multidisciplinary artist and designer
- Nahshon Dion (1996), writer
- Ricky Ervins (1987), USC Rose Bowl Game MVP 1990, NFL Washington Redskins Super Bowl XXVI leading rusher, San Francisco 49ers 1995
- Darrell Evans (1965), major league baseball player, 1969-89
- Scott Garnett (1980), NFL defensive lineman
- Ryan Hollins (2002), NBA player and starting center for the Minnesota Timberwolves, Los Angeles Clippers
- Darick Holmes (1989), NFL player for the Buffalo Bills, Green Bay Packers, Indianapolis Colts
- Michelle Huneven (1969), author
- Bobby Hutcherson (1958), jazz vibraphonist, composer, and bandleader
- Rodney King, beaten by police after a car chase, officers acquittals led to race riots in Los Angeles and the vicinity
- Robert N. Lemen (1961), Minnesota state legislator
- Herbie Lewis (1958), jazz bassist and teacher
- Johnnie Lynn (1975), NFL player, New York Jets, NFL assistant coach, San Francisco 49ers, New York Giants, Philadelphia Eagles
- Saladin McCullough, gridiron football player, brother of Sultan McCullough
- Sultan McCullough (1998), NFL player
- Anthony Miller (1983), NFL wide receiver
- Inger Miller (1990), track and field Olympic gold medalist
- Obea Moore (1997), world record holder in 400-meter races for runners 17 and under at 45.14; one of the fastest US high school runners of all time.
- Dennis Muren (1965), multiple Academy Award-winning visual effects artist (1965)
- Renee Tajima-Peña (1976), documentary filmmaker.
- Danny Pittman (1976), NFL player
- Marcus Robertson (1987), Houston Oilers/ Tennessee Titans and Seattle Seahawks
- David Lee Roth (1972), lead singer of Van Halen 1974-85, 1996, 2007-20.
- Ruwanga Samath (2000), record producer and president of The Bird Call Productions
- Kevon Seymour (2012), NFL player - Buffalo Bills (2016–present)
- Rod Sherman (1962), professional football player
- Sirhan Sirhan (1963), perpetrator who assassinated Robert F. Kennedy
- Jeffrey C. Stewart (1967), professor and Pulitzer Prize winning writer
- Albert Stinson (1962), jazz bassist
- Joel Thomas (1985), 1992 Olympic gold medalist, swimming
- Jacque Vaughn (1993), NBA head coach and player for the Orlando Magic
- LaShaun Ward (1998), NFL player
- DeWayne Walker (1978), CFL professional football player and American football coach
- Ken Whittingham (1977), American Television Director
- Linetta Wilson (1985), Olympic gold medalist, track and field
