= Bob Swift (Canadian football) =

Canadian gridiron football player (born 1943)

No. 44
- Positions: Centre, Fullback

Personal information
- Born: November 29, 1943 (age 82); Shawinigan, Quebec, Canada
- Listed height: 6 ft 0 in (1.83 m)
- Listed weight: 230 lb (104 kg)

Career information
- College: Clemson

Career history

Playing
- 1964–1965: BC Lions
- 1966–1970: Toronto Argonauts
- 1971–1977: Winnipeg Blue Bombers

Coaching
- 1989: Edmonton Eskimos (ST/LB coach)
- 1991: Calgary Stampeders (OL coach)

Awards and highlights
- Grey Cup champion (1964); 3× CFL All-Star (1971, 1972, 1974); 4× CFL West All-Star (1971, 1972, 1973, 1974)

Bob Swift (born November 29, 1943) is a former all-star offensive lineman in the Canadian Football League. The three-time All-Star played from 1964 to 1977 for three teams, mainly for the Winnipeg Blue Bombers.

Born in Shawinigan Falls, Quebec, with French Canadian heritage, his family moved to Lancaster, Pennsylvania when he was seven, where he was an All-American at Lancaster Catholic High School. After one year at Montana State and two at Clemson Swift opted for the CFL, where the BC Lions beat out the Montreal Alouettes for his services. He hoped to teach high school French in the off season in Vancouver.

Swift won the Grey Cup in his rookie season with the British Columbia Lions where he played fullback and rushed for 1,054 yards, being only the 4th Canadian born player to top the thousand yard total for a season. He broke his leg during the Grey Cup game and never regained his form at a fullback, and was traded to the Toronto Argonauts and eventually became an All-Star offensive lineman with the Winnipeg Blue Bombers.

== Career regular season rushing statistics ==
Year	Team	GP	Rush	Yards	Y/R	Lg	TD
1964	BC Lions		229	1054	4.6	24	11
1965	BC Lions		122	501	4.1	16	8
1966	Toronto Argonauts		33	140	4.2	21	1
	CFL Totals		384	1695	4.4	24	20
