= 1972 BC Lions season =

Canadian football team season

- General manager: Jackie Parker
- Head coach: Eagle Keys
- Home stadium: Empire Stadium

Results
- Record: 5–11
- Division place: 5th, West
- Playoffs: did not qualify

Uniform

The 1972 BC Lions finished in fifth place in the Western Conference with a 5–11 record and failed to make the playoffs.

After Paul Brothers was traded to Ottawa late in the 1971 season and Tom Wilkinson was released, sophomore pivot Don Moorhead became the Lions' starting quarterback. While Moorhead threw for 2606 yards, he also threw 17 interceptions and the offence continued to struggle at only 15.9 points per game.

The lone bright spot on offence was receiver Jim Young. He led the league with 1362 yards receiving and won his second Schenley as Outstanding Canadian. Young was a CFL all-star along with rookie linebacker Ray Nettles, for whom the Lions outbid the Miami Dolphins of the NFL in the off-season.

For the first season since the 1950s, the team wore orange jerseys at home. The new jerseys had northwestern stripes on each arm.

== Offseason ==
=== CFL draft ===
Round	Pick	Player	Position	School

== Preseason ==
Game	Date	Opponent	Results		Venue	Attendance
Game	Date	Opponent	Score	Record	Venue	Attendance

== Regular season ==
=== Season standings ===
Western Football Conference
Team	GP	W	L	T	PF	PA	Pts
Winnipeg Blue Bombers	16	10	6	0	401	300	20
Edmonton Eskimos	16	10	6	0	380	368	20
Saskatchewan Roughriders	16	8	8	0	330	283	16
Calgary Stampeders	16	6	10	0	331	394	12
BC Lions	16	5	11	0	254	380	10

=== Season schedule ===
Game	Date	Opponent	Results	
Game	Date	Opponent	Score	Record
1	Aug 1	at Edmonton Eskimos	L 22–34	0–1
2	Aug 8	vs. Hamilton Tiger-Cats	W 19–17	1–1
3	Aug 14	at Calgary Stampeders	L 14–19	1–2
4	Aug 17	vs. Winnipeg Blue Bombers	L 7–39	1–3
5	Aug 25	at Edmonton Eskimos	L 7–29	1–4
6	Sept 7	at Winnipeg Blue Bombers	L 7–42	1–5
7	Sept 12	vs. Saskatchewan Roughriders	L 13–24	1–6
8	Sept 17	at Montreal Alouettes	L 17–22	1–7
9	Sept 20	at Toronto Argonauts	W 23–9	2–7
10	Sept 26	vs. Ottawa Rough Riders	L 17–20	2–8
11	Oct 3	vs. Winnipeg Blue Bombers	W 26–24	3–8
12	Oct 8	at Saskatchewan Roughriders	L 14–24	3–9
13	Oct 14	vs. Edmonton Eskimos	W 22–16	4–9
14	Oct 21	vs. Calgary Stampeders	L 17–19	4–10
15	Oct 28	at Calgary Stampeders	L 3–28	4–11
16	Nov 4	vs. Saskatchewan Roughriders	W 26–14	5–11

=== Offensive leaders ===
Player	Passing yds	Rush yds	Receiving yds	TD
Don Moorhead	2606	330	0	1
Jim Young		0	1362	11
Jim Evensen		961	329	9
Monroe Eley		517	507	1
Johnny Musso		405	556	3

== Awards and records ==
- CFL's Most Outstanding Canadian Award – Jim Young (WR)

=== 1972 CFL All-Stars ===
- WR – Jim Young, CFL All-Star
- LB – Ray Nettles, CFL All-Star
