= Jesse Mims =

American gridiron football player (born 1948)

No. 19
- Position: Running back

Personal information
- Born: August 27, 1948 (age 78); Alameda, California, U.S.
- Listed height: 5 ft 11 in (1.80 m)
- Listed weight: 203 lb (92 kg)

Career information
- College: New Mexico State

Career history
- 1971–1973: Calgary Stampeders
- 1974: Detroit Wheels
- 1974: Portland Storm

Awards and highlights
- Grey Cup champion (1971)

Jesse Mims (born August 27, 1948) is an American former professional football player who played for the Calgary Stampeders. He won the Grey Cup with Calgary in 1971. He played college football at New Mexico State University.
