= John Harvey (Canadian football) =

American football player (1950–2024)

Profile
- Position: Running back

Personal information
- Born: January 26, 1950 (age 76); Austin, Texas
- Died: May 30, 2024; Austin, Texas
- Listed height: 6 ft 1 in (1.85 m)
- Listed weight: 185 lb (84 kg)

Career information
- College: Tyler Junior

Career history
- 1973: Montreal Alouettes
- 1974–1975: Memphis Southmen
- 1976: Toronto Argonauts
- 1977: Hamilton Tiger-Cats

Awards and highlights
- CFL All-Star (1973); CFL East All-Star (1973); Jeff Russel Memorial Trophy (1973)

John Harvey (born January 26, 1950) is a former award-winning Canadian Football League running back.

In 1970, he was a junior college 1st team All-American at Tyler Junior College in Tyler, Texas.

Despite being recruited to play at Texas by Darrell Royal, he instead played for Texas-Arlington before going pro. He burst into the CFL with the Montreal Alouettes in 1973. Rushing for 1024 yards, with an incredible 7.5 yards per rush average and 32 pass receptions, he was an all-star and won the Jeff Russel Memorial Trophy, being runner up as CFL MVP.

Like many other players lured by the big money, he jumped to the World Football League in 1974, playing 2 seasons with the Memphis Southmen. In his first season, he rushed for 945 yards, caught 21 passes for 275 yards, scored 5 touchdowns, and threw 3 passes (one for a touchdown.) In 1975, rushing behind future NFL Hall-of-Famer Larry Csonka, he gained 137 yards, caught 8 passes for 107 yards, scored 4 touchdowns, and threw 2 passes (1 for a touchdown.) In the short history of the WFL he was 13th on the all-time rushing list, with 1082 yards.

When the WFL folded, he returned to the CFL, playing 10 games for the Toronto Argonauts in 1976 (rushing for 68 yards, catching 26 passes for 459 yards, and 5 touchdowns) and 1 game for the Hamilton Tiger-Cats in 1977.
