= Joe Critchlow =

American gridiron football player (born 1944)

Profile
- Position: Defensive tackle

Personal information
- Born: July 4, 1944 (age 82); Sikeston, Missouri, U.S.
- Listed height: 6 ft 2 in (1.88 m)
- Listed weight: 240 lb (109 kg)

Career history
- 1969–1973: Winnipeg Blue Bombers
- 1974–1975: Montreal Alouettes
- 1975: San Antonio Wings

Awards and highlights
- Grey Cup champion (1974)

Joe Critchlow (born July 4, 1944) is an American former professional football player who played for the Montreal Alouettes and Winnipeg Blue Bombers of the Canadian Football League. He was one of 11 All Division players on the 1972 Blue Bombers and was on the 1974 Grey Cup champion Alouettes team. He played college football at Southeast Missouri State University.
