= 1972 Calgary Stampeders season =

Canadian football team season

- General manager: Rogers Lehew
- Head coach: Jim Duncan
- Home stadium: McMahon Stadium

Results
- Record: 6–10
- Division place: 4th, West
- Playoffs: did not qualify

The 1972 Calgary Stampeders finished in fourth place in the Western Conference with a 6–10 record and failed to make the playoffs.

== Regular season ==
=== Season standings ===
Western Football Conference
Team	GP	W	L	T	PF	PA	Pts
Winnipeg Blue Bombers	16	10	6	0	401	300	20
Edmonton Eskimos	16	10	6	0	380	368	20
Saskatchewan Roughriders	16	8	8	0	330	283	16
Calgary Stampeders	16	6	10	0	331	394	12
BC Lions	16	5	11	0	254	380	10

=== Season schedule ===
Week	Game	Date	Opponent	Results		Venue	Attendance
Week	Game	Date	Opponent	Score	Record	Venue	Attendance
	1		Winnipeg Blue Bombers	W 31–7	1–0		
	2		Winnipeg Blue Bombers	L 14–41	1–1		
	3		BC Lions	W 19–14	2–1		
	4		Saskatchewan Roughriders	L 10–12	2–2		
	5		Saskatchewan Roughriders	L 3–35	2–3		
	6		Edmonton Eskimos	L 19–31	2–4		
	7		Edmonton Eskimos	L 20–27	2–5		
	8		Winnipeg Blue Bombers	L 8–22	2–6		
	9		Montreal Alouettes	W 34–15	3–6		
	10		Saskatchewan Roughriders	W 31–14	4–6		
	11		Hamilton Tiger-Cats	L 24–50	4–7		
	12		Ottawa Rough Riders	L 30–45	4–8		
	13		Toronto Argonauts	L 27–33	4–9		
	14		BC Lions	W 19–17	5–9		
	15		BC Lions	W 28–3	6–9		
	16		Edmonton Eskimos	L 14–28	6–10		

== Awards and records ==
- CFL's Most Outstanding Lineman Award – John Helton (DE)

=== 1972 CFL All-Stars ===
- DE – John Helton, CFL All-Star
