= Terry Wellesley =

Canadian football player (born 1948)

Profile
- Positions: Slotback, Running back

Personal information
- Born: July 10, 1948 (age 78)
- Listed height: 6 ft 0 in (1.83 m)
- Listed weight: 205 lb (93 kg)

Career information
- College: Tennessee Tech

Career history
- 1970–1974: Ottawa Rough Riders
- 1975–1976: Hamilton Tiger-Cats

Awards and highlights
- Grey Cup champion (1973)

Terry Wellesley (born July 10, 1948) is a retired Canadian football player who played for the Ottawa Rough Riders and Hamilton Tiger-Cats. He played college football at the Tennessee Technological University.
