= Tyrone Walls =

American gridiron football player (born 1947)

No. 75
- Positions: Tight end, End

Personal information
- Born: December 31, 1947 (age 78); Chicago, Illinois, U.S.
- Listed height: 6 ft 2 in (1.88 m)
- Listed weight: 210 lb (95 kg)

Career information
- College: Missouri
- NFL draft: 1971: 8th round, 185th overall pick

Career history
- 1972–1976: Edmonton Eskimos
- 1977–1978: BC Lions

Awards and highlights
- Grey Cup champion (1975)

Tyrone Walls (born December 31, 1947) is an American former professional football player who played for the Edmonton Eskimos and BC Lions. Walls played college football at the University of Missouri and was drafted by the Buffalo Bills in the eighth round of the 1971 NFL draft, but played his entire professional career in the CFL.
