= Dave Buchanan (Canadian football) =

American gridiron football player (born 1948)

Profile
- Position: Running back

Personal information
- Born: April 23, 1948 (age 78); Pasadena, California, U.S.
- Listed height: 5 ft 8 in (1.73 m)
- Listed weight: 198 lb (90 kg)

Career information
- High school: John Muir (Pasadena, California)
- College: Arizona State

Career history
- 1971–1972: Hamilton Tiger-Cats
- 1974: Winnipeg Blue Bombers

Awards and highlights
- Grey Cup champion (1972); CFL All-Star (1972); CFL East All-Star (1972); WAC Offensive Player of the Year (1969)

Dave Buchanan (born April 23, 1948) is a Canadian former all-star and Grey Cup champion running back in the Canadian Football League (CFL).

== Career ==
An all-star with the Arizona State Sun Devils, Buchanan signed with the Cincinnati Bengals in 1971. Instead of staying with their taxi squad, he opted to play in Canada with the Hamilton Tiger-Cats, rushing for 213 yards that season. 1972 was a career year, as he rushed for 1163 yards, caught 25 passes for 275 yards, and scored 7 TDs. He was chosen as a CFL all-star. He topped the season with a victory in the Grey Cup game. Buchanan finished his career with the Winnipeg Blue Bombers in 1974.

Buchanan was assistant head coach and in charge of the running backs for La Salle College Preparatory in Pasadena, California.
