= Dan Dever =

Canadian gridiron football player (born 1946)

No. 30
- Positions: Defensive back, linebacker

Personal information
- Born: February 7, 1946 (age 80); Ottawa, Ontario, Canada
- Listed height: 6 ft 0 in (1.83 m)
- Listed weight: 180 lb (82 kg)

Career information
- College: Wake Forest

Career history
- 1968–1973: Ottawa Rough Riders
- 1974: BC Lions

Awards and highlights
- 3× Grey Cup champion (1968, 1969, 1973)

Dan Dever (born February 7, 1946) is a Canadian former professional football player who played for the Ottawa Rough Riders and BC Lions. He won the Grey Cup in 1968, 1969 and 1973. He previously played college football at Wake Forest University. Dever wore #30.
