= Wayne Smith (defensive lineman) =

Canadian football League defensive end

No. 75
- Position: Defensive end

Personal information
- Born: January 24, 1950; Halifax, Nova Scotia, Canada
- Died: November 27, 2016 (aged 66); Halifax, Nova Scotia, Canada
- Listed height: 6 ft 4 in (1.93 m)
- Listed weight: 230 lb (104 kg)

Career history
- 1969–1975: Ottawa Rough Riders
- 1976: BC Lions
- 1977–1979: Toronto Argonauts
- 1979–1980: Saskatchewan Roughriders
- 1980: Hamilton Tiger-Cats

Awards and highlights
- 2× Grey Cup champion (1969, 1973); James P. McCaffrey Trophy (1974); 2× CFL All-Star (1972, 1974); 2× CFL East All-Star (1972, 1974)

Wayne Dennis Smith (January 24, 1950 – November 27, 2016) was a Canadian Football League defensive end who played twelve seasons for five different teams. Smith never played high school or college football but was discovered by Bob Hayes, the Athletic Director at Saint Mary’s University. He was a CFL All-Star two times and was on the Grey Cup winning team in 1969 and 1973. He died in his sleep at his home in Halifax on November 27, 2016. He was 66 and had 9 children.
