= Doug Collins (Canadian football) =

Canadian gridiron football player (born 1945)

Profile
- Positions: Defensive tackle, Tackle

Personal information
- Born: February 18, 1945 (age 81); Windsor, Ontario, Canada
- Listed height: 6 ft 4 in (1.93 m)
- Listed weight: 240 lb (109 kg)

Career information
- College: Cincinnati

Career history
- 1968–1974: Ottawa Rough Riders
- 1975: Hamilton Tiger-Cats

Awards and highlights
- Grey Cup champion (1968, 1969, 1973)

Doug Collins (born February 18, 1945) is a former Canadian professional football player who played for the Ottawa Rough Riders and Hamilton Tiger-Cats. He won the Grey Cup in 1968, 1969 and 1973. He previously played college football at the University of Cincinnati. A brother, Ted Collins, also played in the CFL.
