= Bob Macoritti =

Canadian football player (born 1950)

Profile
- Position: Kicker

Personal information
- Born: September 19, 1950 (age 76)
- Listed height: 6 ft 5 in (1.96 m)
- Listed weight: 190 lb (86 kg)

Career information
- College: Wooster

Career history
- 1975: Winnipeg Blue Bombers
- 1976–1980: Saskatchewan Roughriders

Bob Macoritti (born September 19, 1950) is a retired Canadian football player who played for the Winnipeg Blue Bombers and Saskatchewan Roughriders of the Canadian Football League (CFL). He played college football at The College of Wooster.
