= Cleveland Vann =

American gridiron football player (born 1951)

No. 72
- Position: Linebacker

Personal information
- Born: 3 September 1951 (age 75); Seguin, Texas. U.S.

Career information
- College: Oklahoma State University
- NFL draft: 1974: 5th round, 130th overall pick

Career history
- 1974: Southern California Sun
- 1976–1980: Saskatchewan Roughriders

Awards and highlights
- Grey Cup Most Valuable Player (1976); First-team All-American (1973); 2× First-team All-Big Eight (1972, 1973)

Cleveland Vann (born September 3, 1951) is a former Canadian Football League (CFL) linebacker.

An American import, Vann was a member of the Saskatchewan Roughriders who played the 1976 Grey Cup. He also played one season in the WFL, with the Southern California Sun, intercepting three passes. He tore his knee ligaments in a game in July 1979, but returned the following year. After further hand and wrist injuries, however, he was unable to maintain his place on the roster and retired.

In the 1976 Grey Cup Vann's Saskatchewan Roughriders lost to the Ottawa Rough Riders 23 to 20. The Grey Cup Most Valuable Player award was presented to Cleveland Vann, for his second half interception and his wide-ranging play.

After his football days ended, he went home to Texas to work in law enforcement. In 1989, he returned to Regina, and became a manager with Health and Safety Services at SaskEnergy, and married Connie. Cleveland now works for Magna Electric Corporation in the safety division.
