= Lew Porter (gridiron football) =

American gridiron football player (born 1947)

Lewis Porter
Profile
- Position: Wide receiver

Personal information
- Born: March 7, 1947 (age 79); Clarksdale, Mississippi, U.S.
- Listed height: 5 ft 11 in (1.80 m)
- Listed weight: 178 lb (81 kg)

Career information
- College: Southern

Career history
- 1970: Kansas City Chiefs (NFL)
- 1971–1977: Hamilton Tiger-Cats (CFL)

Awards and highlights
- Grey Cup champion (1972)
- Stats at Pro Football Reference

Lewis Porter (born March 7, 1947) was an American and Canadian football player who played for the Hamilton Tiger-Cats and Kansas City Chiefs. He won the Grey Cup with Hamilton in 1972. He played college football at Southern University and A&M College.
