= 1972 Ottawa Rough Riders season =

Canadian football team season

- Owner: David Loeb
- General manager: Frank Clair
- Head coach: Jack Gotta
- Home stadium: Lansdowne Park

Results
- Record: 11–3
- Division place: 2nd, East
- Playoffs: Lost Eastern Finals

Uniform

The 1972 Ottawa Rough Riders finished the season in second place in the Eastern Conference with an 11–3 record, with all three losses coming at the hands of the 1st place Hamilton Tiger-Cats. The team lost in the Eastern Finals series to those same Tiger-Cats by a total points score of 30–27.

== Preseason ==
Game	Date	Opponent	Results		Venue	Attendance
Game	Date	Opponent	Score	Record	Venue	Attendance
A	July 6	at Hamilton Tiger-Cats	W 22–21	1–0		
B	July 12	vs. Saskatchewan Roughriders	W 19–16	2–0		
C	July 19	vs. Toronto Argonauts	W 51–7	3–0		
D	July 25	at Winnipeg Blue Bombers	L 28–29	3–1		

== Regular season ==
=== Standings ===
Eastern Football Conference
Team	GP	W	L	T	PF	PA	Pts
Hamilton Tiger-Cats	14	11	3	0	372	262	22
Ottawa Rough Riders	14	11	3	0	298	228	22
Montreal Alouettes	14	4	10	0	246	353	8
Toronto Argonauts	14	3	11	0	254	298	6

=== Schedule ===
Week	Game	Date	Opponent	Results		Venue	Attendance
Week	Game	Date	Opponent	Score	Record	Venue	Attendance
1	1	Aug 2	vs. Saskatchewan Roughriders	W 22–7	1–0		
2	2	Aug 10	at Montreal Alouettes	W 28–19	2–0		
3	3	Aug 16	at Toronto Argonauts	W 14–8	3–0		
4	Bye						
5	4	Aug 30	vs. Toronto Argonauts	W 14–13	4–0		
5	5	Sept 4	at Hamilton Tiger-Cats	L 16–17	4–1		
6	6	Sept 9	vs. Montreal Alouettes	W 38–23	5–1		
7	7	Sept 16	vs. Hamilton Tiger-Cats	L 22–30	5–2		
8	8	Sept 23	at Edmonton Eskimos	W 10–9	6–2		
9	9	Sept 26	at BC Lions	W 20–17	7–2		
9	10	Oct 1	vs. Hamilton Tiger-Cats	L 20–25	7–3		
10	11	Oct 9	vs. Calgary Stampeders	W 45–30	8–3		
11	Bye						
12	12	Oct 22	at Montreal Alouettes	W 17–7	9–3		
13	13	Oct 28	at Toronto Argonauts	W 21–16	10–3		
14	14	Nov 4	vs. Winnipeg Blue Bombers	W 11–7	11–3		

== Postseason ==
Round	Date	Opponent	Results		Venue	Attendance
Round	Date	Opponent	Score	Record	Venue	Attendance
East Semi-Final	Nov 11	vs. Montreal Alouettes	W 14–11	1–0		
East Final Game 1	Nov 18	vs. Hamilton Tiger-Cats	W 19–7	2–0		
East Final Game 2	Nov 26	at Hamilton Tiger-Cats	L 8–23	2–1		

=== Player stats ===
==== Passing ====
Player	Attempts	Completions	Pct.	Yards	Touchdowns	Interceptions
Rick Cassata	357	179	50.1	2548	13	22

=== Awards and honors ===
- CFL's Coach of the Year – Jack Gotta
- Jerry Campbell, Linebacker, CFL All-Star
- Wayne Smith, Defensive End, CFL All-Star
