= 1972 Toronto Argonauts season =

CFL team season

- Head coach: Leo Cahill
- Home stadium: Exhibition Stadium

Results
- Record: 3–11
- Division place: 4th, East
- Playoffs: did not qualify

Uniform

The 1972 Toronto Argonauts finished in fourth place in the Eastern Conference with a 3–11 record and failed to make the playoffs.

== Regular season ==
=== Standings ===
Eastern Football Conference
Team	GP	W	L	T	PF	PA	Pts
Hamilton Tiger-Cats	14	11	3	0	372	262	22
Ottawa Rough Riders	14	11	3	0	298	228	22
Montreal Alouettes	14	4	10	0	246	353	8
Toronto Argonauts	14	3	11	0	254	298	6

=== Schedule ===
Week	Date	Opponent	Result	Record	Venue	Attendance
1	Aug 3	vs. Montreal Alouettes	L 8–19	0–1	Exhibition Stadium	33,135
2	Aug 9	at Saskatchewan Roughriders	L 6–15	0–2	Taylor Field	15,771
3	Aug 16	vs. Ottawa Rough Riders	L 8–14	0–3	Exhibition Stadium	33,135
4	Aug 23	at Winnipeg Blue Bombers	L 19–21	0–4	Winnipeg Stadium	25,210
5	Aug 30	at Ottawa Rough Riders	L 13–14	0–5	Landsdowne Park	27,472
5	Sept 4	at Montreal Alouettes	W 43–21	1–5	Molson Stadium	14,594
6	Sept 10	vs. Hamilton Tiger-Cats	L 18–22	1–6	Exhibition Stadium	33,135
7	Bye					
8	Sept 20	vs. BC Lions	L 9–23	1–7	Exhibition Stadium	33,135
8	Sept 24	at Hamilton Tiger-Cats	L 14–41	1–8	Ivor Wynne Stadium	34,410
9	Sept 30	vs. Edmonton Eskimos	L 30–31	1–9	Exhibition Stadium	33,135
10	Oct 8	vs. Montreal Alouettes	W 21–3	2–9	Exhibition Stadium	32,571
11	Oct 15	at Calgary Stampeders	W 33–27	3–9	McMahon Stadium	18,201
12	Bye					
13	Oct 28	vs. Ottawa Rough Riders	L 16–21	3–10	Exhibition Stadium	33,135
14	Nov 5	at Hamilton Tiger-Cats	L 16–26	3–11	Ivor Wynne Stadium	35,217

== Awards and honors ==
- Jim Stillwagon, Defensive Tackle, CFL All-Star
