= Richard Bell (running back) =

American football player (born 1967)

No. 21
- Position: Running back

Personal information
- Born: May 3, 1967 (age 59); Los Angeles, California, U.S.
- Listed height: 6 ft 0 in (1.83 m)
- Listed weight: 200 lb (91 kg)

Career information
- High school: John Muir (Pasadena, California)
- College: Nebraska
- NFL draft: 1990: 12th round, 319th overall pick

Career history
- Pittsburgh Steelers (1990); Kansas City Chiefs (1991)*
- * Offseason or practice squad member only

Career NFL statistics
- Rushing yards: 18
- Rushing average: 3.6
- Receptions: 12
- Receiving yards: 137
- Touchdowns: 1
- Stats at Pro Football Reference

Richard Aaron Bell (born May 3, 1967) is an American former professional football player who was a running back for one season in the National Football League (NFL) with the Pittsburgh Steelers. He played college football for the Nebraska Cornhuskers.

== Early life ==
Bell was born in Los Angeles, California, and is a 1984 graduate of John Muir High School in Pasadena, California.

He matriculated at the University of Nebraska–Lincoln.

== Professional career ==
Bell was selected by the Pittsburgh Steelers in the twelfth round of the 1990 NFL draft with the 319th overall pick. After appearing in eight games with the Steelers in 1990, he was left unprotected by the team under Plan B free agency and was signed by the Kansas City Chiefs. He was released by the Chiefs prior to the 1991 season.

== Post-football career ==
He started his law enforcement career as a reserve officer with the Monrovia Police Department in 1995. In 1996, Bell was hired by the San Marino Police Department and was assigned to the Patrol Division. In 1999, he joined the West Covina Police Department Family.

As a police officer, and later as a corporal, Bell served as a school resource officer, explorer advisor, and field training officer. In 2004, he was assigned to the detective bureau, first serving as the grand theft auto detective and later as a miscellaneous crimes against persons detective.

In 2006, Bell was promoted to sergeant. He was assigned to the Patrol Division, the detective bureau, and the professional standards section. In 2010, he was promoted to lieutenant and was assigned to the Patrol Division, the professional standards section, the administrative section, and the detective bureau. In addition, Bell supervised the communications center. In 2013, he was promoted to captain and assigned to the Investigative Support & Services Division. Bell was promoted to chief in July 2019.

== Personal life ==
His son, Jered Bell, played defensive back for the University of Colorado at Boulder.
