= Charlie Brandon =

American football player (1943–2022)

Profile
- Positions: Defensive end, Guard

Personal information
- Born: September 13, 1943; Wake County, North Carolina, U.S.
- Died: August 9, 2022 (aged 78); Virginia Beach, Virginia, U.S.

Career information
- College: Shaw University

Career history
- 1967: Winnipeg Blue Bombers
- 1967–69: Norfolk Neptunes
- 1972–78: Ottawa Rough Riders

Awards and highlights
- 2× Grey Cup champion (1973, 1976); Grey Cup MVP (1973); CFL East All-Star (1978)

Charles Edward Brandon (September 13, 1943 – August 9, 2022) was an American football player, all-star, and Grey Cup champion lineman in the Canadian Football League (CFL), playing seven seasons with the Ottawa Rough Riders.

A graduate of Shaw University, Brandon started his career playing one game for the Winnipeg Blue Bombers in 1967. He then spent three seasons in the Continental Football League playing for the semi-pro Norfolk Neptunes. He returned to Canada and began a seven-year stay in Ottawa, where he was a part of the feared "Capital Punishment" defensive unit. He won two Grey Cups and in his final season switched to offensive guard, and was an all-star. He was the Grey Cup Most Valuable Player in 1973.

Brandon died on August 9, 2022, at the age of 78, in Virginia Beach, Virginia.
