= Lorenzo Davis (American football) =

American football player (born 1968)

No. 89
- Position: Wide receiver

Personal information
- Born: February 12, 1968 (age 58); Fort Lauderdale, Florida, U.S.
- Listed height: 5 ft 11 in (1.80 m)
- Listed weight: 185 lb (84 kg)

Career information
- High school: Dillard (Fort Lauderdale)
- College: Youngstown State (1985–1989)
- NFL draft: 1990: undrafted

Career history
- Pittsburgh Steelers (1990); Winnipeg Blue Bombers (1992)*
- * Offseason or practice squad member only
- Stats at Pro Football Reference

Lorenzo Edward Davis (born February 12, 1968) is an American former professional football wide receiver who played for the Pittsburgh Steelers of the National Football League (NFL). He played college football for the Youngstown State Penguins.

== Early life ==
Lorenzo Edward Davis was born on February 12, 1968, in Fort Lauderdale, Florida. He played basketball, baseball, and football at Dillard High School in Fort Lauderdale. He earned four varsity letters in basketball, four varsity letters in baseball, and two varsity letters in football.

== College career ==
Davis enrolled at Youngstown State University to play college football for the Penguins. He redshirted the 1985 season and was a four-year letterman from 1986 to 1989. He was a running back from 1986 to 1988 and a wide receiver in 1989. Davis finished his college career with totals of 393 carries for 1,976 yards and 16 touchdowns, and 125 receptions for 1,637 yards and eight touchdowns. He was the first player in school history to record more than 1,000 career rushing yards and 1,000 career receiving yards. Davis graduated from Youngstown State with a bachelor's degree in labor relations. He was inducted into the school's athletics hall of fame in 1989.

== Professional career ==
After going undrafted in the 1990 NFL draft, Davis signed with the Pittsburgh Steelers on May 3. He was released on September 4, signed to the practice squad on October 1, and promoted to the active roster on October 29. He then played in the next four games for the Steelers in a reserve role before being released on November 30. Davis was re-signed to the practice squad on December 4, 1990. He became a free agent after the 1990 season and re-signed with Pittsburgh on February 14, 1991. He was released on August 19, 1991, after the third of four preseason games.

Davis signed with the Winnipeg Blue Bombers of the Canadian Football League in April 1992. He was released on June 15, 1992, during training camp.

== Personal life ==
Davis later worked as a teacher with the Broward County School Board.
