= Peter Mueller (Canadian football) =

Canadian gridiron football player

Profile
- Position: tight end

Personal information
- Born: November 27, 1951 (age 74)
- Listed height: 6 ft 5 in (1.96 m)
- Listed weight: 235 lb (107 kg)

Career information
- College: Western Illinois University

Career history
- 1973–1981: Toronto Argonauts

Awards and highlights
- 1978 - Tom Pate Memorial Award

Peter Mueller or Muller is a former professional Canadian football player. He played as a tight end for the Toronto Argonauts of the Canadian Football League from 1973 to 1981.

One of the great Argo tight ends, he played 9 years and 126 regular season games. He led the team in receiving in 1974, '77 and '78. After his football days he was Vice-Principal at Queensway Christian College in Mississauga, and used to work in Calgary, Alberta as the Principal at Master's College, a Christian school.

In 1978, he won the Tom Pate Memorial Award for outstanding sportsmanship and dedication to his community.
