= Paul Desjardins =

Canadian football player

Profile
- Position: Centre

Personal information
- Born: September 27, 1943 (age 83); Ottawa, Ontario, Canada
- Listed height: 6 ft 3 in (1.91 m)
- Listed weight: 248 lb (112 kg)

Career information
- University: Ottawa

Career history
- 1965–1970: Winnipeg Blue Bombers
- 1971–1973: Toronto Argonauts

Awards and highlights
- CFL All-Star (1973); 3× CFL East All-Star (1971, 1972, 1973)

Paul Desjardins (born September 27, 1943) is a former all-star professional Canadian football offensive lineman who played for the Winnipeg Blue Bombers and Toronto Argonauts. He also had a career as a biochemist: having retired from football after his time in Winnipeg, he moved to California and was engaged in research on skeletal muscles. However, Desjardins was enticed back to the pitch by Argonauts coach Leo Cahill, who had helped secure him a position at the University of Toronto's Banting Institute working on the metabolism of the heart.
