= Dave Gasser (Canadian football) =

Canadian football player

Profile
- Position: Guard

Personal information
- Born: October 7, 1942 (age 84); McKeesport, Pennsylvania, US
- Listed height: 6 ft 1 in (1.85 m)
- Listed weight: 225 lb (102 kg)

Career information
- College: West Texas State

Career history
- 1967–1972: Edmonton Eskimos

Awards and highlights
- CFL All-Star (1970, 1971, 1972)

David Gasser (born October 7, 1942) is an American-born Canadian football player who played for the Edmonton Eskimos where he wore jersey uniform number 65. He previously played football at West Texas State University. He later worked as a police officer in Larkspur, California. Thereafter he was employed as an Inspector for the Marin County District Attorney’s Office until his retirement.
