= Gene Lakusiak =

Canadian gridiron football player (1942–2020)

Profile
- Position: Halfback

Personal information
- Born: June 1, 1942; Rossdale, Manitoba, Canada
- Died: July 29, 2020 (aged 78); Winnipeg, Manitoba, Canada
- Listed height: 6 ft 1 in (1.85 m)
- Listed weight: 210 lb (95 kg)

Career information
- College: Tulsa

Career history
- 1967: Ottawa Rough Riders
- 1968–1974: Winnipeg Blue Bombers

Gene Lakusiak (June 1, 1942 – June 29, 2020) was a Canadian professional football player who played for the Ottawa Rough Riders and Winnipeg Blue Bombers. He played college football at the University of Tulsa.
