= Rudy Sims =

American gridiron football player (born 1946)

Profile
- Position: Defensive tackle

Personal information
- Born: October 25, 1946 (age 80); Tampa, Florida, U.S.
- Listed height: 6 ft 1 in (1.85 m)
- Listed weight: 250 lb (113 kg)

Career information
- College: Florida A&M

Career history
- 1971–1977: Ottawa Rough Riders
- 1977: Toronto Argonauts
- 1978: Hamilton Tiger-Cats

Awards and highlights
- Grey Cup champion (1973); CFL All-Star (1973); CFL East All-Star (1973)

Rudy Sims (born October 25, 1946) is an American former professional football player who played for the Ottawa Rough Riders, Toronto Argonauts and Hamilton Tiger-Cats. He played college football at Florida A&M University.
