= Bob Richardson (Canadian football) =

American gridiron football player (born 1948)

Profile
- Position: Slotback

Personal information
- Born: December 3, 1948 (age 77); Hamilton, Ontario, Canada
- Listed height: 6 ft 5 in (1.96 m)
- Listed weight: 250 lb (113 kg)

Career information
- College: Iowa State

Career history
- 1972–1974: Hamilton Tiger-Cats
- 1975–1978: Saskatchewan Roughriders

Awards and highlights
- Grey Cup champion (1972); CFL West All-Star (1976); Gruen Trophy (1972)

Bob Richardson (born December 3, 1948) is a former Canadian Football League player.

Richardson graduated from Iowa State University, where he represented the Cyclones in the 1972 North - South all star games as an offensive lineman, though he could play tight end. In 1972, he played with the Hamilton Tiger-Cats, where he won the Gruen Trophy as the best rookie in the East and a Grey Cup championship. He would play there until 1974 and then play 4 more seasons with the Saskatchewan Roughriders, when he retired after the 1978 season.
