= John Williams (defensive back, born 1942) =

American gridiron football player (born 1942)

Profile
- Position: Defensive back

Personal information
- Born: September 19, 1942 (age 84); Fort Worth, Texas, US
- Listed height: 6 ft 1 in (1.85 m)
- Listed weight: 190 lb (86 kg)

Career information
- College: New Mexico Highlands University

Career history
- 1967: Calgary Stampeders
- 1969–1974: Hamilton Tiger-Cats
- 1974: Edmonton Eskimos
- 1975: Toronto Argonauts

Awards and highlights
- Grey Cup champion (1972)

John "Twiggy" Williams (born September 19, 1942) was an American professional football player who played for the Calgary Stampeders, Hamilton Tiger-Cats, Edmonton Eskimos and Toronto Argonauts. He won the Grey Cup with Hamilton in 1972. Williams played college football at the University of New Mexico. His son, John Williams also played in the CFL.
