= Rick Cassata =

American gridiron football player (born 1947)

James Cassata
Profile
- Position: Quarterback

Personal information
- Born: November 17, 1947 (age 78); Buffalo, New York, U.S.

Career information
- College: Syracuse University

Career history
- 1968: Saskatchewan Roughriders
- 1969: Winnipeg Blue Bombers
- 1971–1974: Ottawa Rough Riders
- 1975: The Hawaiians (WFL)
- 1976: British Columbia Lions
- 1976: Hamilton Tiger-Cats

Awards and highlights
- Grey Cup champion (1973)

James Rick Cassata (born November 17, 1947) is an American former gridiron football quarterback who played seven seasons in the Canadian Football League (CFL) for five different teams. He led the Ottawa Rough Riders to victory in the 61st Grey Cup. He also played with The Hawaiians in the World Football League (WFL) in 1975. He played at Tonawanda High School before playing college football at Syracuse University. In 2002, he was inducted into the Greater Buffalo Sports Hall of Fame.
