= 1972 CFL season =

Canadian Football League season

- East champions: Hamilton Tiger-Cats
- West champions: Saskatchewan Roughriders

60th Grey Cup
- Champions: Hamilton Tiger-Cats

CFL seasons
- 1971 1973

Canadian Football League team locations: West, East

The 1972 CFL season is considered to be the 19th season in modern-day Canadian football, although it is officially the 15th Canadian Football League season.

== CFL news in 1972 ==
The Canadian Football Hall of Fame was officially opened on November 28, 1972, in Hamilton. The Grey Cup game was played on AstroTurf at nearby Ivor Wynne Stadium.

The Western Conference Finals were now played under a single-elimination game. The Eastern Conference continued to play a two-game total-point series affair in their Conference Final round until the following season, when it adopted the West's single-game elimination in the Conference Final round as well.

== Regular season standings ==
West Division
Pos	Team	Pld	W	L	T	PF	PA	PD	Pts
1	Winnipeg Blue Bombers (C, Q)	16	10	6	0	401	300	+101	20
2	Edmonton Eskimos (Q)	16	10	6	0	380	368	+12	20
3	Saskatchewan Roughriders (Q)	16	8	8	0	330	283	+47	16
4	Calgary Stampeders	16	6	10	0	331	394	−63	12
5	BC Lions	16	5	11	0	254	380	−126	10

(C) First round bye; (Q) Qualified for playoffs

East Division
Pos	Team	Pld	W	L	T	PF	PA	PD	Pts
1	Hamilton Tiger-Cats (C, Q)	14	11	3	0	372	262	+110	22
2	Ottawa Rough Riders (Q)	14	11	3	0	298	228	+70	22
3	Montreal Alouettes (Q)	14	4	10	0	246	353	−107	8
4	Toronto Argonauts	14	3	11	0	254	298	−44	6

(C) First round bye; (Q) Qualified for playoffs

Winnipeg and Hamilton have first round byes.

== Grey Cup playoffs ==
Note: All dates in 1972

=== Conference Semi-Finals ===
Eastern Semi-Finals
Montreal Alouettes @ Ottawa Rough Riders
Date	Away	Home
November 11	Montreal Alouettes 11	Ottawa Rough Riders 14

Western Semi-Finals
Saskatchewan Roughriders @ Edmonton Eskimos
Date	Away	Home
November 12	Saskatchewan Roughriders 8	Edmonton Eskimos 6

=== Conference Finals ===
Western Finals
Saskatchewan Roughriders @ Winnipeg Blue Bombers
Date	Away	Home
November 19	Saskatchewan Roughriders 27	Winnipeg Blue Bombers 24

This game was especially notable for its final play. The game was tied and Saskatchewan attempted a last-second field goal to win, or at least score a single. The kick missed wide, and was recovered by Winnipeg in the end zone. As they were unable to run it out, they punted. The Saskatchewan player who fielded the punt attempted to score a single (winning the game) by punting it through the end zone again, but was unsuccessful, and the punt was fielded by Winnipeg, who punted it out again. The Saskatchewan returner was tackled, ending the play and presumably the game, but a Winnipeg penalty negated the play and gave Saskatchewan another chance. The second Saskatchewan field goal attempt, with no time on the clock, was successful.

Eastern Finals
Hamilton Tiger-Cats vs. Ottawa Rough Riders
Game	Date	Away	Home
1	November 18	Hamilton Tiger-Cats 7	Ottawa Rough Riders 19
2	November 26	Ottawa Rough Riders 8	Hamilton Tiger-Cats 23
Hamilton won total-point series 30–27

== Playoff bracket ==
Division Semifinals
East
E2	Montreal Alouettes	11
E3	Ottawa Rough Riders	14
West
W2	Edmonton Eskimos	6
W3	Saskatchewan Roughriders	8

Division Finals
E1	Hamilton Tiger-Cats	30 (7+23)
E2	Ottawa Rough Riders	27 (19+8)
W1	Winnipeg Blue Bombers	24
W3	Saskatchewan Roughriders	27

60th Grey Cup
E1	Hamilton Tiger-Cats	13
W3	Saskatchewan Roughriders	10

=== Grey Cup Championship ===
December 3 60th Annual Grey Cup Game: Ivor Wynne Stadium – Hamilton, Ontario
Western Champion	Eastern Champion
Saskatchewan Roughriders 10	Hamilton Tiger-Cats 13
The Hamilton Tiger-Cats are the 1972 Grey Cup Champions
Chuck Ealey (QB), Hamilton Tiger-Cats – Grey Cup's Most Valuable Player.; Ian Sunter (K), Hamilton Tiger-Cats – Grey Cup's Most Valuable Canadian.

== CFL leaders ==
- CFL passing leaders
- CFL rushing leaders
- CFL receiving leaders

== 1972 CFL All-Stars ==
=== Offence ===
- QB – Don Jonas, Winnipeg Blue Bombers
- RB – George Reed, Saskatchewan Roughriders
- RB – Mack Herron, Winnipeg Blue Bombers
- RB – Dave Buchanan, Hamilton Tiger-Cats
- TE – Peter Dalla Riva, Montreal Alouettes
- TE – Tony Gabriel, Hamilton Tiger-Cats
- WR – Garney Henley, Hamilton Tiger-Cats
- WR – Jim Young, BC Lions
- C – Bob Swift, Winnipeg Blue Bombers
- OG – Bob Lueck, Winnipeg Blue Bombers
- OG – Jack Abendschan, Saskatchewan Roughriders
- OT – Bill Frank, Winnipeg Blue Bombers
- OT – Ed George, Montreal Alouettes

=== Defence ===
- DT – Jim Stillwagon, Toronto Argonauts
- DT – John Helton, Calgary Stampeders
- DE – Bill Baker, Saskatchewan Roughriders
- DE – Wayne Smith, Ottawa Rough Riders
- LB – Dave Gasser, Edmonton Eskimos
- LB – Ray Nettles, BC Lions
- LB – Jerry Campbell, Ottawa Rough Riders
- DB – Al Brenner, Hamilton Tiger-Cats
- DB – Johnny Williams, Hamilton Tiger-Cats
- DB – Grady Cavness, Winnipeg Blue Bombers
- DB – Dick Adams, Ottawa Rough Riders
- DB – Marv Luster, Toronto Argonauts

== 1972 Eastern All-Stars ==
=== Offence ===
- QB – Chuck Ealey, Hamilton Tiger-Cats
- RB – Ike Brown, Montreal Alouettes
- RB – Moses Denson, Montreal Alouettes
- RB – Dave Buchanan, Hamilton Tiger-Cats
- TE – Peter Dalla Riva, Montreal Alouettes
- TE – Tony Gabriel, Hamilton Tiger-Cats
- WR – Garney Henley, Hamilton Tiger-Cats
- WR – Eric Allen, Toronto Argonauts
- C – Paul Desjardins, Toronto Argonauts
- OG – Ed Chalupka, Hamilton Tiger-Cats
- OG – Jon Hohman, Hamilton Tiger-Cats
- OT – Bill Danychuk, Hamilton Tiger-Cats
- OT – Ed George, Montreal Alouettes

=== Defence ===
- DT – Jim Stillwagon, Toronto Argonauts
- DT – Rudy Sims, Ottawa Rough Riders
- DE – George Wells, Hamilton Tiger-Cats
- DE – Jim Corrigall, Toronto Argonauts
- DE – Wayne Smith, Ottawa Rough Riders
- LB – Mike Widger, Montreal Alouettes
- LB – Gene Mack, Toronto Argonauts
- LB – Jerry Campbell, Ottawa Rough Riders
- DB – Al Brenner, Hamilton Tiger-Cats
- DB – Johnny Williams, Hamilton Tiger-Cats
- DB – Rod Woodward, Ottawa Rough Riders
- DB – Dick Adams, Ottawa Rough Riders
- DB – Marv Luster, Toronto Argonauts

== 1972 Western All-Stars ==
=== Offence ===
- QB – Don Jonas, Winnipeg Blue Bombers
- RB – George Reed, Saskatchewan Roughriders
- RB – Mack Herron, Winnipeg Blue Bombers
- RB – Tom Campana, Saskatchewan Roughriders
- TE – Tyrone Walls, Edmonton Eskimos
- WR – Gerry Shaw, Calgary Stampeders
- WR – Jim Thorpe, Winnipeg Blue Bombers
- WR – Jim Young, BC Lions
- C – Bob Swift, Winnipeg Blue Bombers
- OG – Bob Lueck, Winnipeg Blue Bombers
- OG – Jack Abendschan, Saskatchewan Roughriders
- OG – Larry Watkins, Edmonton Eskimos
- OT – Bill Frank, Winnipeg Blue Bombers
- OT – Charlie Turner, Edmonton Eskimos

=== Defence ===
- DT – Joe Critchlow, Winnipeg Blue Bombers
- DT – John Helton, Calgary Stampeders
- DT – John LaGrone, Edmonton Eskimos
- DE – Bill Baker, Saskatchewan Roughriders
- DE – Jim Heighton, Winnipeg Blue Bombers
- LB – Dave Gasser, Edmonton Eskimos
- LB – Ray Nettles, BC Lions
- LB – Mickey Doyle, Winnipeg Blue Bombers
- DB – Frank Andruski, Calgary Stampeders
- DB – Bruce Bennett, Saskatchewan Roughriders
- DB – Grady Cavness, Winnipeg Blue Bombers
- DB – Dick Dupuis, Edmonton Eskimos
- DB – Gene Lakusiak, Winnipeg Blue Bombers
- DB – Larry Robinson, Calgary Stampeders

== 1972 CFL awards ==
- CFL's Most Outstanding Player Award – Garney Henley (WR), Hamilton Tiger-Cats
- CFL's Most Outstanding Canadian Award – Jim Young (WR), BC Lions
- CFL's Most Outstanding Lineman Award – John Helton (DT), Calgary Stampeders
- CFL's Most Outstanding Rookie Award – Chuck Ealey (QB), Hamilton Tiger-Cats
- CFL's Coach of the Year – Jack Gotta, Ottawa Rough Riders
- Jeff Russel Memorial Trophy (Eastern MVP) – Garney Henley (WR), Hamilton Tiger-Cats
- Jeff Nicklin Memorial Trophy (Western MVP) - Mack Herron (RB), Winnipeg Blue Bombers
- Gruen Trophy (Eastern Rookie of the Year) - Bob Richardson (OL), Hamilton Tiger-Cats
- Dr. Beattie Martin Trophy (Western Rookie of the Year) - Walt McKee (K/P), Winnipeg Blue Bombers
- DeMarco–Becket Memorial Trophy (Western Outstanding Lineman) - John Helton (DT), Calgary Stampeders
