= 1973 CFL season =

Canadian Football League season

- East champions: Ottawa Rough Riders
- West champions: Edmonton Eskimos

61st Grey Cup
- Champions: Ottawa Rough Riders

CFL seasons
- 1972 1974

Canadian Football League team locations: West, East

The 1973 CFL season is considered to be the 20th season in modern-day Canadian football, although it is officially the 16th Canadian Football League season.

== CFL news in 1973 ==
Both the Western and Eastern Conferences adopt the same playoff procedure, consisting of the second place teams in each conference hosting the third place teams in the conference semifinal games and the first place teams hosting the semi-finals' winners in the conference finals. All rounds now consisted of single-game playoffs, as opposed to a two-game total point series (although this format would return in use by what was by then the East Division in 1986 only); the West adopted this format the previous year. Other than the addition of the crossover rule in 1997, this playoff format is in still in use in the CFL.

This was the final season where the conferences would play seasons of different lengths. The Eastern Conference would expand its schedule to sixteen games for 1974. Somewhat ironically, this was also the most recent season (as of 2017) where a fourth-placed Eastern team would earn more points (despite playing fewer games) than the third placed Western team - the scenario which triggers a "crossover" under the current playoff format.

== Regular season standings ==
West Division
Pos	Team	Pld	W	L	T	PF	PA	PD	Pts
1	Edmonton Eskimos (C, Q)	16	9	5	2	329	284	+45	20
2	Saskatchewan Roughriders (Q)	16	10	6	0	360	287	+73	20
3	BC Lions (Q)	16	5	9	2	261	328	−67	12
4	Calgary Stampeders	16	6	10	0	214	368	−154	12
5	Winnipeg Blue Bombers	16	4	11	1	267	315	−48	9

(C) First round bye; (Q) Qualified for playoffs

East Division
Pos	Team	Pld	W	L	T	PF	PA	PD	Pts
1	Ottawa Rough Riders (C, Q)	14	9	5	0	275	234	+41	18
2	Toronto Argonauts (Q)	14	7	5	2	265	231	+34	16
3	Montreal Alouettes (Q)	14	7	6	1	273	238	+35	15
4	Hamilton Tiger-Cats	14	7	7	0	304	263	+41	14

(C) First round bye; (Q) Qualified for playoffs

Edmonton and Ottawa have first round byes.

== Grey Cup playoffs ==
The Ottawa Rough Riders are the 1973 Grey Cup champions, defeating the Edmonton Eskimos, 22–18, at Toronto's Exhibition Stadium. Ottawa's Charlie Brandon (DE) was named the Grey Cup's Most Valuable Player, while Edmonton's Garry Lefebvre (DB) was named Grey Cup's Most Valuable Canadian.

=== Playoff bracket ===
November 10/11: Division Semifinals
East
E3	Montreal Alouettes	32*
E2	Toronto Argonauts	10
West
W3	BC Lions	13
W2	Saskatchewan Roughriders	33

November 17/18: Division Finals
E3	Montreal Alouettes	14
E1	Ottawa Rough Riders	23
W2	Saskatchewan Roughriders	23
W1	Edmonton Eskimos	25

November 25: 61st Grey Cup @ Exhibition Stadium – Toronto
E1	Ottawa Rough Riders	22
W1	Edmonton Eskimos	18

*-Team won in Overtime.

== CFL leaders ==
- CFL passing leaders
- CFL rushing leaders
- CFL receiving leaders

== 1973 CFL All-Stars ==
=== Offence ===
- QB – Ron Lancaster, Saskatchewan Roughriders
- RB – George Reed, Saskatchewan Roughriders
- RB – Roy Bell, Edmonton Eskimos
- RB – John Harvey, Montreal Alouettes
- TE – Peter Dalla Riva, Montreal Alouettes
- WR – George McGowan, Edmonton Eskimos
- WR – Johnny Rodgers, Montreal Alouettes
- C – Paul Desjardins, Toronto Argonauts
- OG – Jack Abendschan, Saskatchewan Roughriders
- OG – Ed George, Montreal Alouettes
- OT – Bill Frank, Winnipeg Blue Bombers
- OT – Charlie Turner, Edmonton Eskimos

=== Defence ===
- DT – John Helton, Calgary Stampeders
- DT – Rudy Sims, Ottawa Rough Riders
- DE – Bill Baker, Saskatchewan Roughriders
- DE – Jim Corrigall, Toronto Argonauts
- LB – Jerry Campbell, Ottawa Rough Riders
- LB – Ray Nettles, BC Lions
- LB – Mike Widger, Montreal Alouettes
- DB – Lorne Richardson, Saskatchewan Roughriders
- DB – Larry Highbaugh, Edmonton Eskimos
- DB – Al Marcelin, Ottawa Rough Riders
- DB – Lewis Porter, Hamilton Tiger-Cats
- DB – Dick Adams, Ottawa Rough Riders

== 1973 Eastern All-Stars ==
=== Offence ===
- QB – Joe Theismann, Toronto Argonauts
- RB – Jim Evenson, Ottawa Rough Riders
- RB – Andy Hopkins, Hamilton Tiger-Cats
- RB – John Harvey, Montreal Alouettes
- TE – Peter Dalla Riva, Montreal Alouettes
- WR – Eric Allen, Toronto Argonauts
- WR – Johnny Rodgers, Montreal Alouettes
- C – Paul Desjardins, Toronto Argonauts
- OG – Ed Chalupka, Hamilton Tiger-Cats
- OG – Ed George, Montreal Alouettes
- OT – Bill Danychuk, Hamilton Tiger-Cats
- OT – Dan Yochum, Montreal Alouettes

=== Defence ===
- DT – Gordon Judges, Montreal Alouettes
- DT – Rudy Sims, Ottawa Rough Riders
- DE – Carl Crennel, Montreal Alouettes
- DE – Jim Corrigall, Toronto Argonauts
- LB – Jerry Campbell, Ottawa Rough Riders
- LB – Gene Mack, Toronto Argonauts
- LB – Mike Widger, Montreal Alouettes
- DB – Tim Anderson, Toronto Argonauts
- DB – Dickie Harris, Montreal Alouettes
- DB – Al Marcelin, Ottawa Rough Riders
- DB – Lewis Porter, Hamilton Tiger-Cats
- DB – Dick Adams, Ottawa Rough Riders

== 1973 Western All-Stars ==
=== Offence ===
- QB – Ron Lancaster, Saskatchewan Roughriders
- RB – George Reed, Saskatchewan Roughriders
- RB – Roy Bell, Edmonton Eskimos
- RB – Johnny Musso, BC Lions
- TE – Lefty Hendrickson, BC Lions
- WR – George McGowan, Edmonton Eskimos
- WR – Tom Forzani, Calgary Stampeders
- C – Basil Bark, Calgary Stampeders
- C – Bob Howes, Edmonton Eskimos
- C – Bob Swift, Winnipeg Blue Bombers
- OG – Jack Abendschan, Saskatchewan Roughriders
- OG – Ralph Galloway, Saskatchewan Roughriders
- OT – Bill Frank, Winnipeg Blue Bombers
- OT – Charlie Turner, Edmonton Eskimos

=== Defence ===
- DT – John Helton, Calgary Stampeders
- DT – John LaGrone, Edmonton Eskimos
- DE – Bill Baker, Saskatchewan Roughriders
- DE – Ron Estay, Edmonton Eskimos
- LB – Sam Britts, Edmonton Eskimos
- LB – Ray Nettles, BC Lions
- LB – Roger Goree, Saskatchewan Roughriders
- DB – Lorne Richardson, Saskatchewan Roughriders
- DB – Larry Highbaugh, Edmonton Eskimos
- DB – Frank Andruski, Calgary Stampeders
- DB – Gene Lakusiak, Winnipeg Blue Bombers
- DB – Ted Provost, Saskatchewan Roughriders

== 1973 CFL awards ==
- CFL's Most Outstanding Player Award – George McGowan (WR), Edmonton Eskimos
- CFL's Most Outstanding Canadian Award – Gerry Organ (K), Ottawa Rough Riders
- CFL's Most Outstanding Lineman Award – Ray Nettles (LB), BC Lions
- CFL's Most Outstanding Rookie Award – Johnny Rodgers (WR), Montreal Alouettes
- CFL's Coach of the Year – Jack Gotta, Ottawa Rough Riders
- Dr. Beattie Martin Trophy (Western Rookie of the Year) - Lorne Richardson (DB), Saskatchewan Roughriders
- DeMarco–Becket Memorial Trophy (Western Outstanding Lineman) - Ray Nettles (LB), BC Lions
