= List of professional gridiron football coaches with 200 wins =

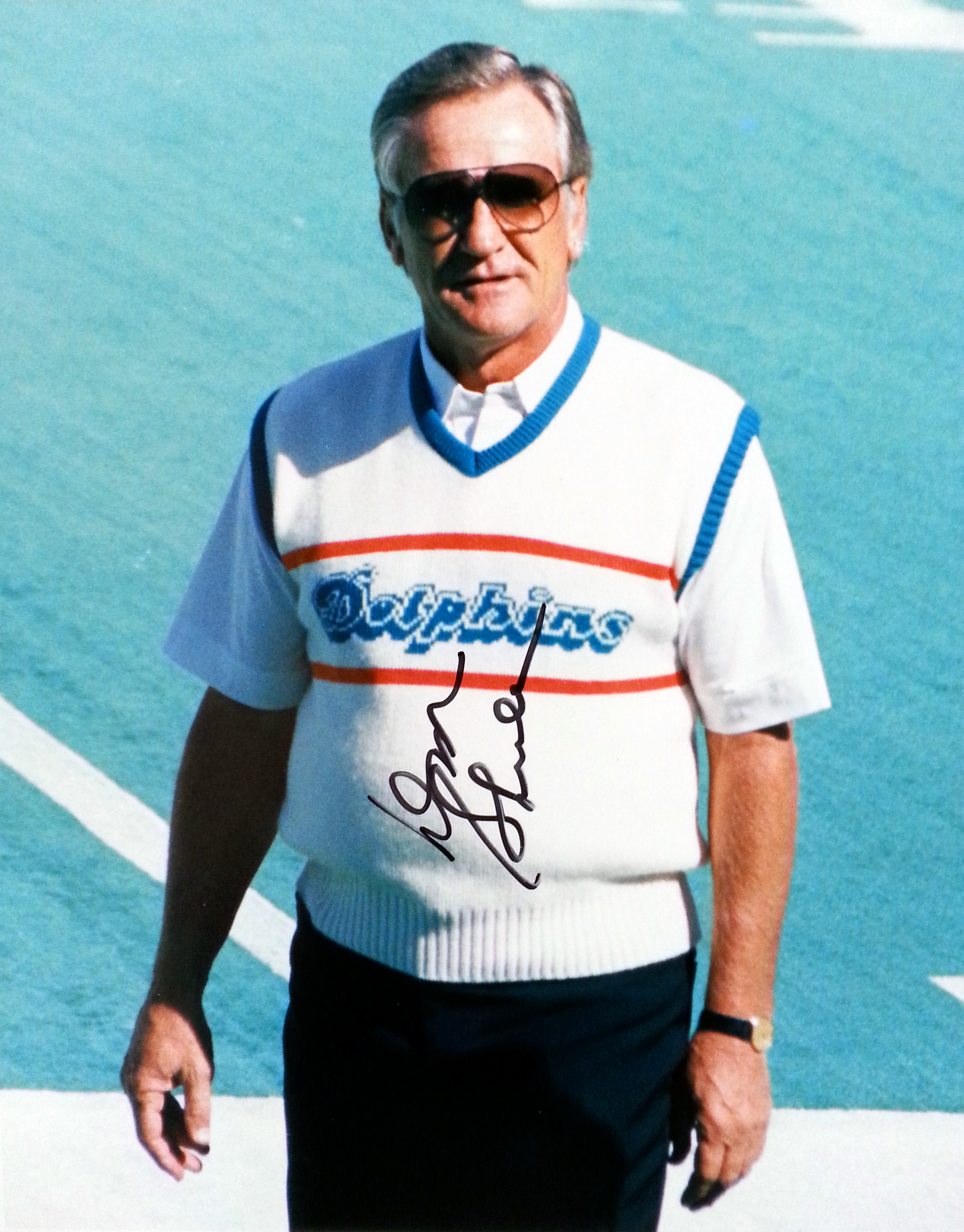
Don Shula, who won 328 games as head coach of the Baltimore Colts (1963 to 1969) and then the Miami Dolphins (1970 to 1995), leads the National Football League in all-time wins

Through the end of the 2024–2025 season in professional football, only thirteen coaches have won 200 career regular season victories. An additional four coaches achieved 200 total wins, but fell short of the milestone in the regular season prior to retiring.

Coaches listed in bold are currently active.

== Key ==
†	Inducted into the Pro Football Hall of Fame
††	Inducted into the Canadian Football Hall of Fame
†††	Inducted into the Canadian Football Hall of Fame and Pro Football Hall of Fame
††††	Coached in both the Grey Cup and Super Bowl
†*	Inducted into the Indoor Football League Hall of Fame
†**	Inducted into the Arena Football Hall of Fame
†***	Inducted into the af2 Hall of Fame

== Coaches with 200 regular season wins ==
Rank	Name	Years	Wins	Losses	Ties	Pct.	Teams
1	Don Shula^{†}	33	328	156	6	.676	Baltimore Colts (1963–1969)
1	Don Shula^{†}	33	328	156	6	.676	Miami Dolphins (1970–1995)
2	George Halas^{†}	40	318	148	31	.671	Decatur Staleys (1920)
2	George Halas^{†}	40	318	148	31	.671	Chicago Staleys (1921)
2	George Halas^{†}	40	318	148	31	.671	Chicago Bears (1922–1929, 1933–1942, 1946–1955, 1958–1967)
3	Bill Belichick	27	302	165	0	.647	Cleveland Browns (1991–1995)
3	Bill Belichick	27	302	165	0	.647	New England Patriots (2000–2023)
**4**	**Andy Reid**	**28**	**283**	**152**	**1**	**.650**	Philadelphia Eagles (1999–2012)
**4**	**Andy Reid**	**28**	**283**	**152**	**1**	**.650**	**Kansas City Chiefs (2013–present)**
5	Wally Buono^{††}	24	282	165	3	.646	Calgary Stampeders (1990–2002)
5	Wally Buono^{††}	24	282	165	3	.646	British Columbia Lions (2003–2011, 2016–2018)
6	Bud Grant^{†††, ††††}	28	260	153	7	.627	Winnipeg Blue Bombers (1957–1966)
6	Bud Grant^{†††, ††††}	28	260	153	7	.627	Minnesota Vikings (1967–1983, 1985)
7	Curly Lambeau^{†}	35	252	134	24	.644	Green Bay Packers (1919–1949)
7	Curly Lambeau^{†}	35	252	134	24	.644	Chicago Cardinals (1950–1951)
7	Curly Lambeau^{†}	35	252	134	24	.644	Washington Redskins (1952–1953)
8	Tom Landry^{†}	29	250	162	6	.605	Dallas Cowboys (1960–1988)
9	Don Matthews^{††}	23	236	138	1	.631	British Columbia Lions (1983–1987)
9	Don Matthews^{††}	23	236	138	1	.631	Toronto Argonauts (1990, 1996–1998, 2008)
9	Don Matthews^{††}	23	236	138	1	.631	Orlando Thunder (1991)
9	Don Matthews^{††}	23	236	138	1	.631	Saskatchewan Roughriders (1991–1993)
9	Don Matthews^{††}	23	236	138	1	.631	Baltimore Stallions (1994–1995)
9	Don Matthews^{††}	23	236	138	1	.631	Edmonton Eskimos (1999–2000)
9	Don Matthews^{††}	23	236	138	1	.631	Montreal Alouettes (2000–2006)
**10**	Kevin Guy^{†***}	**20**	**227**	**68**		**.769**	New Jersey Red Dogs (2000)
**10**	Kevin Guy^{†***}	**20**	**227**	**68**		**.769**	Tennessee Valley Vipers (2002–2004)
**10**	Kevin Guy^{†***}	**20**	**227**	**68**		**.769**	Rio Grande Valley Dorados (2005)
**10**	Kevin Guy^{†***}	**20**	**227**	**68**		**.769**	**Arizona Rattlers (2008–present)**
11	Kurtiss Riggs^{†*}	21	226 (Note: Had five wins officially forfeited for insurance violation in 2009; this list reflects that)	59 (Note: The five wins officially forfeited in 2009 were reversed to losses; this list reflects that)		.793 (Note: Without the forfeited wins, Riggs has a win percentage of .811)	Sioux Falls Storm (2003–2023)
12	Paul Brown^{†}	25	213	104	9	.667	Cleveland Browns (1946–1962)
12	Paul Brown^{†}	25	213	104	9	.667	Cincinnati Bengals (1968–1975)
13	Marty Schottenheimer	22	203	127	1	.615	Cleveland Browns (1984–1988)
13	Marty Schottenheimer	22	203	127	1	.615	Kansas City Chiefs (1989–1998)
13	Marty Schottenheimer	22	203	127	1	.615	Washington Redskins (2001)
13	Marty Schottenheimer	22	203	127	1	.615	San Diego Chargers (2002–2006)
13	Marty Schottenheimer	22	203	127	1	.615	Virginia Destroyers (2011)

=== Retired coaches with 200 total wins (including post-season) ===
This list reflects retired coaches that had accomplished 200 total wins, including the post-season, but failed to reach the 200 wins milestone in the regular season prior to retiring. Through the end of the 2022 season, only four former coaches have achieved this.

Rank	Name	Years	Total record	Regular season record	Teams
1	Tim Marcum^{†**}	21	212–99 (.682)	184–87 (.679)	Denver Dynamite (1987)
1	Tim Marcum^{†**}	21	212–99 (.682)	184–87 (.679)	Detroit Drive (1988–1989, 1991–1993)
1	Tim Marcum^{†**}	21	212–99 (.682)	184–87 (.679)	Tampa Bay Storm (1995–2010)
2	Chuck Noll^{†}	23	209–156–1 (.572)	193–148–1 (.566)	Pittsburgh Steelers (1969–1991)
3	Marv Levy^{†††, ††††}	23	209–167–4 (.555)	191–156–4 (.550)	Montreal Alouettes (1973–1977)
3	Marv Levy^{†††, ††††}	23	209–167–4 (.555)	191–156–4 (.550)	Kansas City Chiefs (1978–1982)
3	Marv Levy^{†††, ††††}	23	209–167–4 (.555)	191–156–4 (.550)	Chicago Blitz (1984)
3	Marv Levy^{†††, ††††}	23	209–167–4 (.555)	191–156–4 (.550)	Buffalo Bills (1986–1997)
4	Dan Reeves	23	201–174–2 (.536)	190–165–2 (.535)	Denver Broncos (1981–1992)
4	Dan Reeves	23	201–174–2 (.536)	190–165–2 (.535)	New York Giants (1993–1996)
4	Dan Reeves	23	201–174–2 (.536)	190–165–2 (.535)	Atlanta Falcons (1997–2003)

== Other facts ==
Each coach has won at least one NFL Championship, Grey Cup, or Super Bowl, except Marty Schottenheimer, who had never even appeared in any. Despite not winning any championships in the NFL, Schottenheimer did win the UFL Championship in 2011, coaching the Virginia Destroyers; he also won an AFL Championship (pre-merger) in 1965 as a player with the Buffalo Bills. Schottenheimer also remains the only non-active coach not inducted into any Hall of Fame, excluding Kurtiss Riggs and Kevin Guy who have only coached indoor American football. Between the Indoor Football League, United Indoor Football (which merged with another league to form the IFL), and National Indoor Football League with the Sioux Falls Storm Riggs has won eleven championships and appeared in fifteen. This includes a six season championship win streak and ten season appearance streak. The Storm achieved a 40 consecutive game wins streak with Riggs as the head coach, including four undefeated seasons. Riggs also had five wins officially fortified from the team's record due to insurance violations in 2009. Since 2021, he has been inducted into the Indoor Football League Hall of Fame while still actively coaching. Kevin Guy has been one of the most prolific coaches in the Indoor Football League, af2, and Arena Football League. As a head coach he has won four league titles, three ArenaBowls and one United Bowl. He also was inducted into the af2 Hall of Fame and was a finalist for the Arena Football Hall of Fame before the league folded.

There have been nine NFL coaches who have won 200 total games, this excludes Bud Grant and Paul Brown due to their total wins included from other professional leagues, though Brown's victories in the AAFC were eventually added to his total by the NFL in 2025. The two coaches who have won 200 total games, but not 200 regular season games, are Chuck Noll and Dan Reeves. Noll only coached the Pittsburgh Steelers (1969 to 1991), winning four Super Bowls and having a prolific Hall of Fame career. He had 193 total wins in the regular season with 209 wins, 156 losses, and one tie overall (.572). In the regular season Reeves had 190 wins; however, in total he had 201 wins, 174 losses, and two ties (.535). Despite not having 200 career regular season wins as a head coach, Reeves coached in four Super Bowls, losing all of them. He did, however, play and coach as an assistant for the Dallas Cowboys, winning two Super Bowls at each position. Along with Marty Schottenheimer, Reeves is the only other coach to have over 200 total wins to have not won a Super Bowl and also not be inducted into the Pro Football Hall of Fame. Reeves remains the only coach with over 200 total wins to have never won a championship in any league as a head coach. Several other NFL coaches had a little less than 190 total wins, but the only coach with more than 189 wins and less than 200 wins is Chuck Knox. Knox had 186 regular season wins with 193 total wins. He coached the Los Angeles Rams (1973 to 1977), Buffalo Bills (1978 to 1982), Seattle Seahawks (1983 to 1991), and Los Angeles Rams again (1992 to 1994), with no Super Bowl appearances or Hall of Fame nomination despite three AP NFL Coach of the Year Awards.

Bud Grant and Marv Levy are the only coaches to lead teams to both Grey Cup Finals and Super Bowls. Both have been inducted into the Pro Football Hall of Fame and Canadian Football Hall of Fame. They both lost four Super Bowls, individually, while winning several Grey Cups. Between the NFL, CFL, and USFL, Levy had over 200 professional wins, resulting in 209–167–4 (.555) overall. He recorded 191–156–4 (.550) in the regular season, coaching the Montreal Alouettes (1973 to 1977), Kansas City Chiefs (1978 to 1982), Chicago Blitz (1984), and the Buffalo Bills (1986 to 1997).

Tim Marcum is the winningest and most successful coach in Arena Football League history. During the regular season, Marcum resulted in a 184–87 (.679) record and 28–12 (.700) in the post-season, which totals to 212–99 (.682) overall. He coached the Denver Dynamite (1987), Detroit Drive (1988 to 1989 and 1991 to 1993), and the Tampa Bay Storm (1995 to 2010). Marcum has been inducted into the Arena Football Hall of Fame. During his time as a head coach, Marcum coached in eleven ArenaBowls, winning seven of them. Other AFL coaches who came close to 200 wins were Darren Arbet with 188 overall wins (169 regular season wins) and Mike Hohensee with 170 overall wins (158 regular season wins), both are also in the AFL Hall of Fame. While Marcum had more AFL wins, Kevin Guy has built his coaching legacy through other prominent indoor football leagues, such as the af2 and IFL. Guy only had 105 AFL wins.

== See also ==
- List of Canadian Football League head coaches by wins
- List of National Football League head coach wins leaders
