= List of Winnipeg Blue Bombers head coaches =

The Winnipeg Blue Bombers are a professional Canadian football team based in Winnipeg, Manitoba, and are members of the West Division in the Canadian Football League (CFL). The club was founded in 1930 as the Winnipeg Rugby Club and began as a member of the Manitoba Rugby Football Union. They were a founding member of the CFL when it was formed in 1958. The Blue Bombers head coach position is vacant. The general manager is Kyle Walters and the president and chief executive officer for the community-owned team is Wade Miller.

== Key ==
General
#	Number of coaches^{[a]}
†	Elected to the Canadian Football Hall of Fame in the builders category
Achievements	Achievements during their Winnipeg head coaching tenure

Regular season
GC	Games coached	T	Ties = 1 point
W	Wins = 2 points	PTS	Points
L	Losses = 0 points	Win%	Winning percentage^{[b]}

Playoffs and Grey Cup
PGC	Games coached
PW	Wins
PL	Losses
PWin%	Winning percentage

== Head coaches ==
Note: Statistics are current through the end of the 2026 CFL season.

#	Name	Term^{[b]}	GC	W	L	T	PTS	Win%	PGC	PW	PL	PWin%	Achievements
1	Jack Millidge	1930	4	0	4	0	0	.000	—	—	—	—	
2	Pete Barnes	1931	NA	NA	NA	NA	NA	NA	—	—	—	—	
3	Carl Cronin	1932–1933	NA	NA	NA	NA	NA	NA	3	2	1	.667	
4	Greg Kabat	1934	2	2	0	0	4	1.000	1	0	1	.000	
5	Bob Fritz	1935–1937	19	12	6	1	14	.658	8	5	3	.625	23rd Grey Cup championship
6	Reg Threlfall	1938–1941	36	28	8	0	56	.667	13	10	3	.778	27th Grey Cup championship 29th Grey Cup championship
7	Bert Warwick	1945	—	—	—	—	—	—	2	1	1	.500	
8	Jack West	1946–1948	28	13	15	0	26	.464	7	3	4	.429	
9	Frank Larson	1949–1950	28	12	16	0	24	.429	4	2	2	.500	
10	George Trafton	1951–1953	46	28	17	1	57	.620	11	5	6	.455	
11	Allie Sherman	1954–1956	64	36	26	2	74	.578	17	7	8	.471	
12	Bud Grant†	1957–1966	144	90	52	2	182	.632	23	15	8	.652	1965 Annis Stukus Trophy winner 46th Grey Cup championship 47th Grey Cup championship 49th Grey Cup championship 50th Grey Cup championship
13	Joe Zaleski	1967–1969	48	10	27	1	21	.219	—	—	—	—	
14	Jim Spavital	1970–1973	64	23	39	2	48	.375	2	0	2	.000	
15	Bud Riley	1974–1977	64	34	28	2	70	.547	3	0	3	.000	
16	Ray Jauch	1978–1982	80	45	35	0	90	.563	6	2	4	.667	1980 Annis Stukus Trophy winner
17	Cal Murphy†	1983–1986	66	43	22	1	59	.659	8	5	3	.625	1983 Annis Stukus Trophy winner 1984 Annis Stukus Trophy winner 72nd Grey Cup championship
18	Mike Riley	1987–1990	72	40	32	0	80	.556	2	1	1	.500	1988 Annis Stukus Trophy winner 1990 Annis Stukus Trophy winner 76th Grey Cup championship 78th Grey Cup championship
19	Darryl Rogers	1991	18	9	9	0	18	.500	2	1	1	.500	
20	Urban Bowman	1992	18	11	7	0	22	.611	2	1	1	.500	
-	Cal Murphy†	1993–1996	72	43	29	0	86	.597	6	2	4	.333	
21	Jeff Reinebold	1997–1998	32	6	26	0	12	.188	—	—	—	—	
22	Gary Hoffman	1998	4	1	3	0	2	.250	—	—	—	—	
23	Dave Ritchie	1999–2004	97	52	44	1	105	.541	7	3	4	.429	2001 Annis Stukus Trophy winner
24	Jim Daley	2004–2005	29	10	19	0	20	.345	—	—	—	—	
25	Doug Berry	2006–2008	54	27	26	1	55	.509	5	2	3	.400	
26	Mike Kelly	2009	18	7	11	0	14	.389	—	—	—	—	
27	Paul LaPolice	2010–2012	44	16	28	0	32	.364	2	1	1	.500	
28	Tim Burke	2012–2013	28	7	21	0	14	.250	—	—	—	—	
29	Mike O'Shea	2014–2026	212	126	86	0	252	.594	18	10	8	.556	2021 Annis Stukus Trophy winner 2022 Annis Stukus Trophy winner 107th Grey Cup championship 108th Grey Cup championship

== Notes ==
- ^{a} A running total of the number of coaches of the Blue Bombers. Thus, any coach who has two or more separate terms as head coach is only counted once.
- ^{b} Each year is linked to an article about that particular CFL season.
