= Gary Hoffman =

Gary Hoffman may refer to:

- Gary Hoffman (American football coach) (born 1944), American football player and coach
- Gary Hoffman (businessman) (born 1960), chairman of the Premier League
- Gary Hoffman (tackle) (born 1961), tackle in the National Football League
- Gary Hoffman (cellist) (born 1956), Canadian cellist
