= List of BC Lions head coaches =

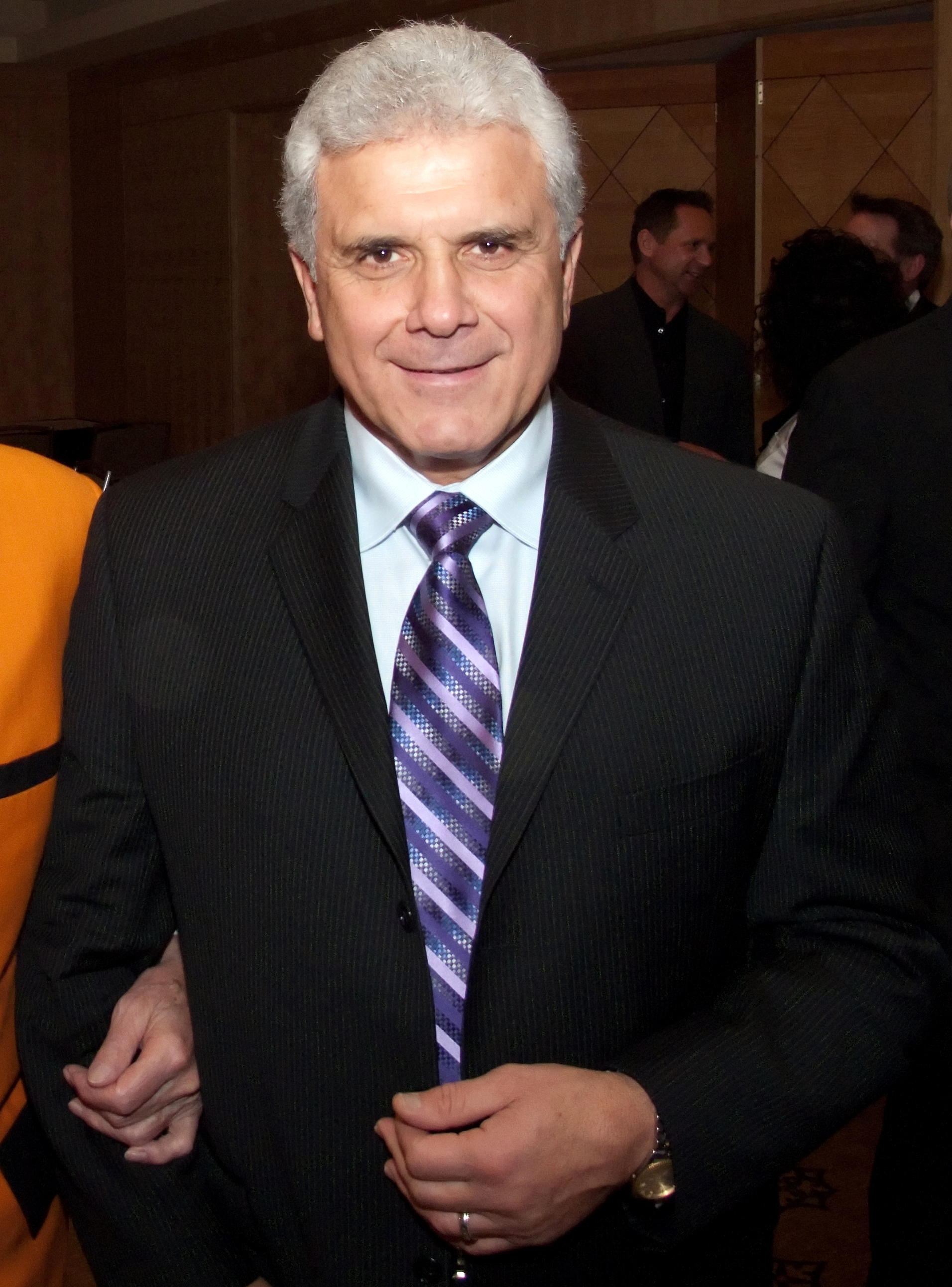
Wally Buono is the Lions' all-time leader in wins and is the only head coach to win two Grey Cups with the Lions.

The BC Lions are a professional Canadian football team based in Vancouver, British Columbia, and are members of the West Division in the Canadian Football League (CFL). The franchise was founded as an expansion team of the Western Interprovincial Football Union (WIFU) in 1954. In their 56-year history, the team has appeared in nine Grey Cup finals, and has won five championships. The Lions current head coach is Buck Pierce and the current owner is Amar Doman.

The Lions' first head coach was Canadian Football Hall of Famer Annis Stukus, who coached the team for two WIFU seasons. The Annis Stukus Trophy—awarded annually to the CFL's best head coach—is named after Stukus. In 1958, the team joined the CFL as one of their charter members. Clem Crowe coached the Lions for its last two seasons in the WIFU and was their first head coach in the CFL. After coaching the first three games of the 1958 season, Crowe was replaced by a group of seven people who coached the Lions for the next two games. Dan Edwards was named head coach for the remaining 11 games. Dave Skrien was the first head coach to coach the Lions for more than three seasons. In his seven years coaching the team he led the Lions to two consecutive Grey Cup finals, including the team's first championship in 1964.

Vic Rapp coached the Lions from 1977 until the end of the 1982 season. He coached 96 regular season games with the Lions, which ranks second among Lions head coaches. Rapp won the Annis Stukus Trophy in the 1977 season, the only Lions head coach to do so without winning a Grey Cup championship. Hall of Famer Don Matthews took over the coaching position in the 1983 season and coached the Lions until midway through the 1987 season. He led the Lions to a Grey Cup championship and was named the Annis Stukus Trophy winner in the 1985 season. Matthews' .706 regular season winning percentage is the best among Lions head coaches.

From 1988 until 2002, no Lions head coach term lasted as long as four complete seasons. During this time, the Lions won the Grey Cup championship twice: under head coach Dave Ritchie in 1994 and under Steve Buratto in 2000. Adam Rita and Wally Buono are the only head coach to have had multiple tenures with the Lions. As of the end of the 2011 season, Wally Buono is the franchise's all-time leader for the most regular-season games coached, regular-season games won, regular-season points, playoff games coached, and playoff games won. Buono coached the Lions to their fifth and sixth Grey Cup championships and was awarded the Annis Stukus Trophy in the 2006 and 2011 seasons. He is the only Lions head coach to have won more than one Grey Cup. Excluding the group of seven, and counting Rita once, there have been 26 head coaches for the Lions franchise.

== Key ==
General
#	Number of coaches^{[a]}
†	Elected to the Canadian Football Hall of Fame in the builders category
Achievements	Achievements during their Lions head coaching tenure

Regular season
GC	Games coached	T	Ties = 1 point
W	Wins = 2 points	PTS	Points
L	Losses = 0 points	W%	Winning percentage^{[b]}

Playoffs and Grey Cup
PGC	Games coached
PW	Wins
PL	Losses
PW%	Winning percentage

== Head coaches ==
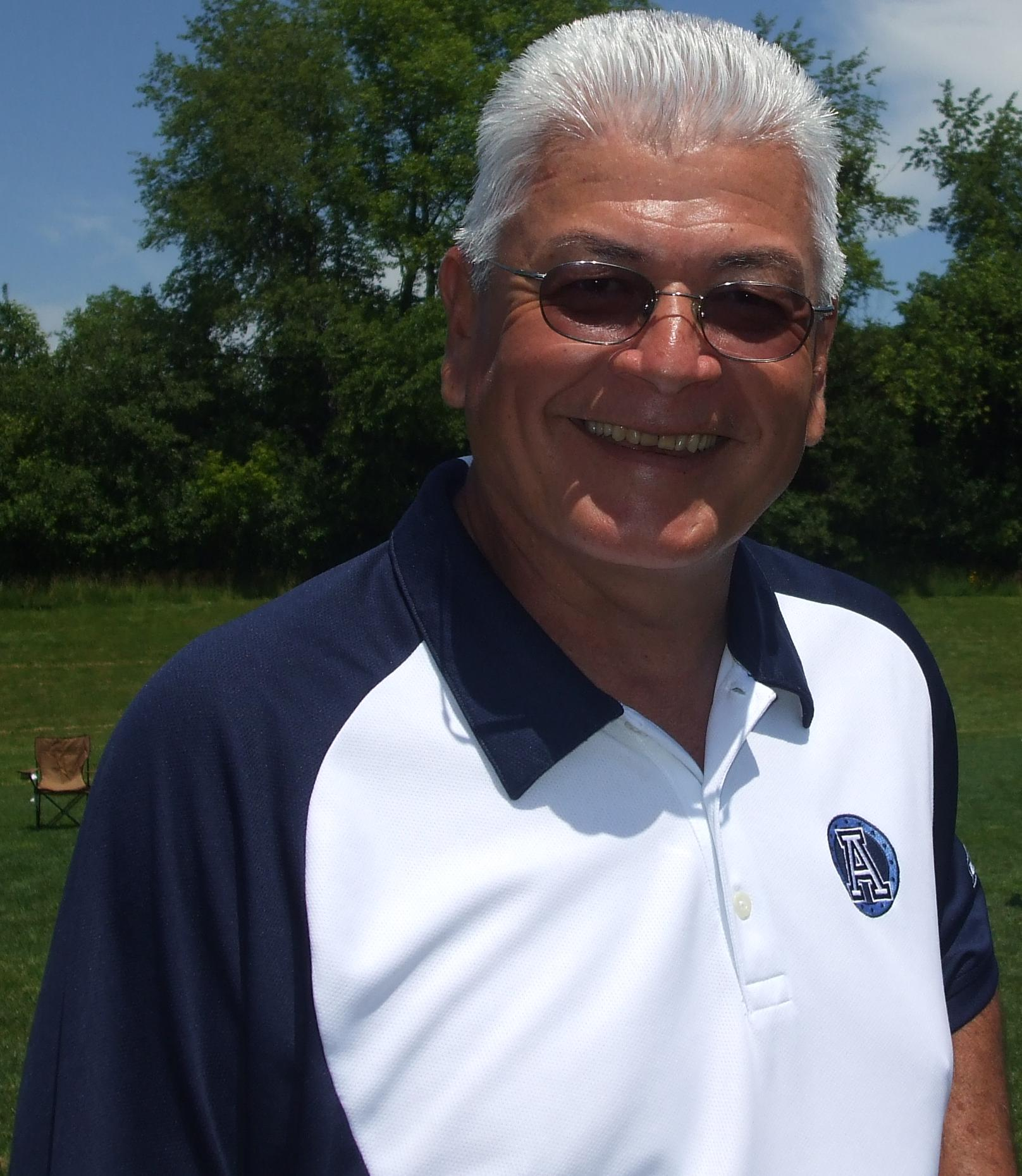
Adam Rita was the first head coach to have coached two stints with the Lions.

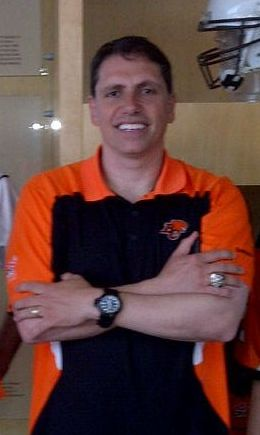
Mike Benevides set a franchise record for most wins by a rookie head coach.

Buck Pierce is the current head coach for the Lions.

Note: Statistics are current through the end of the 2026 CFL season.

#	Name	Term^{[b]}	GC	W	L	T	PTS	W%	PGC	PW	PL	PW%	Achievements
1	Annis Stukus†	1954–1955	32	6	26	0	12	.188	—	—	—	—	
2	Clem Crowe	1956–1958	35	10	24	1	21	.300	—	—	—	—	
–	—^{[c]}	1958	2	0	2	0	0	.000	—	—	—	—	
3	Dan Edwards	1958	11	3	8	0	6	.273	—	—	—	—	
4	Wayne Robinson	1959–1961	39	14	22	3	31	.397	2	0	2	.000	
5	Dave Skrien	1961–1967	92	42	45	5	89	.484	8	5	3	.625	1963 Annis Stukus Trophy winner 52nd Grey Cup championship
6	Ron Morris	1967	1	0	1	0	0	.000	—	—	—	—	
7	Jim Champion	1967–1969	38	8	28	2	18	.237	—	—	—	—	
8	Jackie Parker	1969–1970	22	10	12	0	20	.454	1	0	1	.000	
9	Eagle Keys†	1971–1975	70	25	42	3	53	.379	2	0	2	.000	
10	Cal Murphy†	1975–1976	26	10	14	2	22	.423	—	—	—	—	
11	Vic Rapp	1977–1982	96	53	39	4	110	.573	5	2	3	.400	1977 Annis Stukus Trophy winner
12	Don Matthews†	1983–1987	80	56	23	1	113	.706	7	4	3	.571	1985 Annis Stukus Trophy winner 73rd Grey Cup championship
13	Larry Donovan	1987–1989	26	14	12	0	28	.538	4	2	2	.500	
14	Joe Galat	1989	14	7	7	0	14	.500	—	—	—	—	
15	Lary Kuharich	1990	10	2	7	1	5	.250	—	—	—	—	
16	Jim Young	1990	1	0	1	0	0	.000	—	—	—	—	
17	Bob O'Billovich†	1990–1992	43	18	25	0	36	.419	1	0	1	.000	
18	Dave Ritchie	1993–1995	54	31	22	1	63	.583	5	3	2	.600	82nd Grey Cup championship
19	Joe Paopao	1996	18	5	13	0	10	.278	—	—	—	—	
20	Adam Rita	1997–1998	27	11	16	0	22	.407	1	0	1	.000	
21	Greg Mohns	1998–2000	34	22	12	0	44	.647	2	0	2	.000	
22	Steve Buratto	2000–2002	35	14	21	1	29	.414	4	3	1	.750	88th Grey Cup championship
–	Adam Rita	2002	12	9	3	0	18	.750	1	0	1	.000	
23	Wally Buono†	2003–2011	162	101	60	1	203	.627	14	7	7	.500	94th Grey Cup championship 2006 Annis Stukus Trophy winner 99th Grey Cup championship 2011 Annis Stukus Trophy winner
24	Mike Benevides	2012–2014	54	33	21	0	66	.611	3	0	3	.000	
25	Jeff Tedford	2015	18	7	11	0	14	.389	1	0	1	.000	
-	Wally Buono†	2016–2018	54	28	26	0	56	.519	3	1	2	.333	
26	DeVone Claybrooks	2019	18	5	13	0	10	.278	—	—	—	—	
27	Rick Campbell	2020–2024	68	38	30	0	58	.559	5	2	3	.400	
28	Buck Pierce	2025–present	36	21	15	0	42	.583	4	2	2	.500	

== Notes ==
- ^{a} A running total of the number of coaches of the Lions. Thus, any coach who has two or more separate terms as head coach is only counted once.
- ^{b} Each year is linked to an article about that particular CFL season.
- ^{c} The Lions were coached by a group of players led by Chuck Quilter, Byron Bailey, and Paul Cameron, assistant coaches Vic Lindskog and Walt Schlinkman, training camp coach Fred Owens, and general manager Herb Capozzi during a two-game period in the 1958 CFL season.
