= List of Montreal Alouettes head coaches =

The Montreal Alouettes are a professional Canadian football team based in Montreal, Quebec, and are members of the East Division in the Canadian Football League (CFL).

The Alouettes were founded in 1946, and were in continuous operation until the franchise folded after the 1981. A new team, named the Montreal Concordes, was created for the 1982 season and was in operation for four full seasons as the Concordes. In an effort to reconnect with the fans the team changed their name back to the Alouettes for 1986 and then folded just before the regular season in 1987. The current franchise was relocated from Baltimore, Maryland as the Baltimore Stallions in 1996, after it became known that the NFL was relocating a franchise to that city. The CFL and the Montreal Alouettes organization recognize the history of the original Alouettes, the Concordes, and the current Alouettes as one franchise, and do not consider the Baltimore franchise as a part of the team's history. In their history, the team has appeared in 19 Grey Cup finals, and has won eight championships. The current Alouettes head coach in Jason Maas, the current general manager is Danny Maciocia, and the current owner is Pierre Karl Péladeau.

== Key ==
General
#	Number of coaches^{[a]}
†	Elected to the Canadian Football Hall of Fame in the builders category
Achievements	Achievements during their Montreal head coaching tenure

Regular season
GC	Games coached	T	Ties = 1 point
W	Wins = 2 points	PTS	Points
L	Losses = 0 points	Win%	Winning percentage^{[b]}

Playoffs and Grey Cup
PGC	Games coached
PW	Wins
PL	Losses
PWin%	Winning percentage

== Head coaches ==
Note: Statistics are current through the 2026 CFL season.

#	Name	Term^{[b]}	GC	W	L	T	PTS	Win%	PGC	PW	PL	PWin%	Achievements
1	Lew Hayman†	1946–1951	72	37	33	2	76	.528	7	5	2	.714	37th Grey Cup championship
2	Douglas Walker	1952–1959	108	59	48	1	119	.551	15	6	9	.400	
3	Perry Moss	1960–1962	42	13	25	4	30	.444	4	1	3	.250	
4	Jim Trimble	1963–1965	42	17	25	0	34	.281	3	0	3	.405	
5	Darrell Mudra	1966	14	7	7	0	14	.500	1	0	1	.000	
6	Kay Dalton	1967–1969	42	7	31	4	18	.214	—	—	—	—	
7	Sam Etcheverry	1970–1972	42	17	24	1	35	.417	5	4	1	.800	58th Grey Cup championship
8	Marv Levy†	1973–1977	78	43	31	4	90	.577	10	7	3	.700	1974 Annis Stukus Trophy winner 62nd Grey Cup championship 65th Grey Cup championship
9	Joe Scannella	1978–1981	58	28	28	2	58	.500	7	4	3	.571	
10	Jim Eddy	1981	6	2	4	0	4	.333	1	0	1	.000	
11	Joe Galat	1982–1985	62	19	41	2	40	.323	1	0	1	.000	
12	Gary Durchik	1985–1986	22	6	14	2	14	.318	2	1	1	.500	
–	Joe Faragalli	1987	–	–	–	–	–	–	–	–	–	–	Team folded before Faragalli coached a game
13	Bob Price	1996	18	12	6	0	24	.667	2	1	1	.500	
14	Dave Ritchie†	1997–1998	36	25	10	1	51	.708	4	2	2	.500	
15	Charlie Taaffe	1999–2000	36	24	12	0	48	.667	3	1	2	.333	1999 Annis Stukus Trophy winner 2000 Annis Stukus Trophy winner
16	Rod Rust	2001	17	9	8	0	18	.529	—	—	—	—	
17	Jim Popp	2001	1	0	1	0	0	.000	1	0	1	.000	
18	Don Matthews†	2002–2006	86	58	28	0	116	.674	8	5	3	.625	2002 Annis Stukus Trophy winner 90th Grey Cup championship
–	Jim Popp	2006–2007	22	10	12	0	20	.455	3	1	2	.333	
19	Marc Trestman	2008–2012	90	59	31	0	96	.656	8	5	3	.625	2009 Annis Stukus Trophy winner 97th Grey Cup championship 98th Grey Cup championship
20	Dan Hawkins	2013	5	2	3	0	4	.400	—	—	—	—	
–	Jim Popp	2013	13	6	7	0	12	.461	1	0	1	.000	
21	Tom Higgins	2014–2015	26	12	14	0	24	.462	2	1	1	.500	
–	Jim Popp	2015–2016	22	6	16	0	12	.273	—	—	—	—	
22	Jacques Chapdelaine	2016–2017	17	7	10	0	14	.412	—	—	—	—	First Francophone head coach in team history
23	Kavis Reed	2017	7	0	7	0	0	.000	—	—	—	—	
24	Mike Sherman	2018	18	5	13	0	10	.278	—	—	—	—	
25	Khari Jones	2019–2022	36	18	18	0	36	.500	2	0	2	.000	
26	Danny Maciocia	2022	14	8	6	0	16	.571	2	1	1	.500	
27	Jason Maas	2023–present	72	47	24	1	95	.660	9	6	3	.667	110th Grey Cup championship

== Notes ==
- ^{a} A running total of the number of coaches of the Alouettes. Thus, any coach who has two or more separate terms as head coach is only counted once.
- ^{b} Each year is linked to an article about that particular CFL season.
