= List of Edmonton Elks head coaches =

The Edmonton Elks are a professional Canadian football team based in Edmonton, Alberta, and are members of the West Division in the Canadian Football League (CFL).

Edmonton was founded in 1949, although other teams named the Edmonton Eskimos existed 1895 to 1923 and 1929 to 1939.

The Edmonton Elks are the most successful CFL franchise of the modern era (1949–present), having won the league's Grey Cup 15 times (14 as the Eskimos), including an unmatched five consecutive wins between 1978 and 1982, and most recently in 2026.

== Key ==
General
#	Number of coaches^{[a]}
†	Elected to the Canadian Football Hall of Fame in the builders category
Achievements	Achievements during their Edmonton head coaching tenure

Regular season
GC	Games coached	T	Ties = 1 point
W	Wins = 2 points	PTS	Points
L	Losses = 0 points	Win%	Winning percentage^{[b]}

Playoffs and Grey Cup
PGC	Games coached
PW	Wins
PL	Losses
PWin%	Winning percentage

== Head coaches ==
Note: Statistics are current through the end of the 2026 CFL season.

#	Name	Term^{[b]}	GC	W	L	T	PTS	Win%	PGC	PW	PL	PWin%	Achievements
1	Annis Stukus†	1949–1951	42	19	23	0	38	.452	8	4	4	.500	
2	Frank Filchock	1952	16	9	6	1	19	.600	6	3	3	.500	
3	Darrell Royal	1953	16	12	4	0	24	.750	3	1	2	.333	
4	Pop Ivy	1954–1957	64	50	14	0	100	.781	14	10	4	.714	42nd Grey Cup championship 43rd Grey Cup championship 44th Grey Cup championship
5	Sam Lyle	1958	16	9	6	1	18	.600	5	3	2	.600	
6	Eagle Keys†	1959–1963	80	38	40	2	78	.487	12	7	5	.583	
7	Neill Armstrong	1964–1969	96	37	56	3	77	.398	3	0	3	.000	
8	Ray Jauch	1970–1976	112	65	43	4	134	.602	10	5	5	.500	1970 Annis Stukus Trophy winner 63rd Grey Cup championship
9	Hugh Campbell†	1977–1982	96	70	21	5	145	.769	12	11	1	.917	1979 Annis Stukus Trophy winner 66th Grey Cup championship 67th Grey Cup championship 68th Grey Cup championship 69th Grey Cup championship 70th Grey Cup championship
10	Pete Kettela	1983	8	4	4	0	8	.500	–	–	–	–	
11	Jackie Parker	1983–1987	78	49	28	1	99	.628	6	2	4	.333	
12	Joe Faragalli	1987–1990	70	46	24	0	92	.657	8	5	3	.625	75th Grey Cup championship
13	Ron Lancaster	1991–1997	126	84	42	0	168	.667	13	7	6	.538	1996 Annis Stukus Trophy winner 81st Grey Cup championship
14	Kay Stephenson	1998	18	9	9	0	18	.500	2	1	1	.500	
15	Don Matthews†	1999–2000	36	16	20	0	32	.444	2	0	2	.000	
16	Tom Higgins	2001–2004	72	44	28	0	88	.529	6	3	3	.500	2003 Annis Stukus Trophy winner 91st Grey Cup championship
17	Danny Maciocia	2005–2008	72	33	38	1	67	.465	5	4	1	.800	93rd Grey Cup championship
18	Richie Hall	2009–2010	36	16	20	0	32	.444	1	0	1	.000	
19	Kavis Reed	2011–2013	54	22	32	0	44	.407	3	1	2	.333	
20	Chris Jones	2014–2015	36	26	10	0	52	.722	2	1	1	.500	103rd Grey Cup championship
21	Jason Maas	2016–2019	72	39	33	0	78	.542	6	3	3	.500	
22	Scott Milanovich	2020	–	–	–	–	–	–	–	–	–	–	
23	Jaime Elizondo	2021	14	3	11	0	6	.214	–	–	–	–	
–	Chris Jones	2022–2024	41	8	33	0	16	.195	–	–	–	–	
24	Jarious Jackson	2024	13	7	6	0	14	.538	–	–	–	–	
25	Mark Kilam	2025–present	36	20	16	0	14	.556	2	2	0	1.000	113th Grey Cup championship

== Notes ==
- ^{a} A running total of the number of coaches of the Eskimos/Elks. Thus, any coach who has two or more separate terms as head coach is only counted once.
- ^{b} Each year is linked to an article about that particular CFL season.
