= List of Cleveland Browns head coaches =

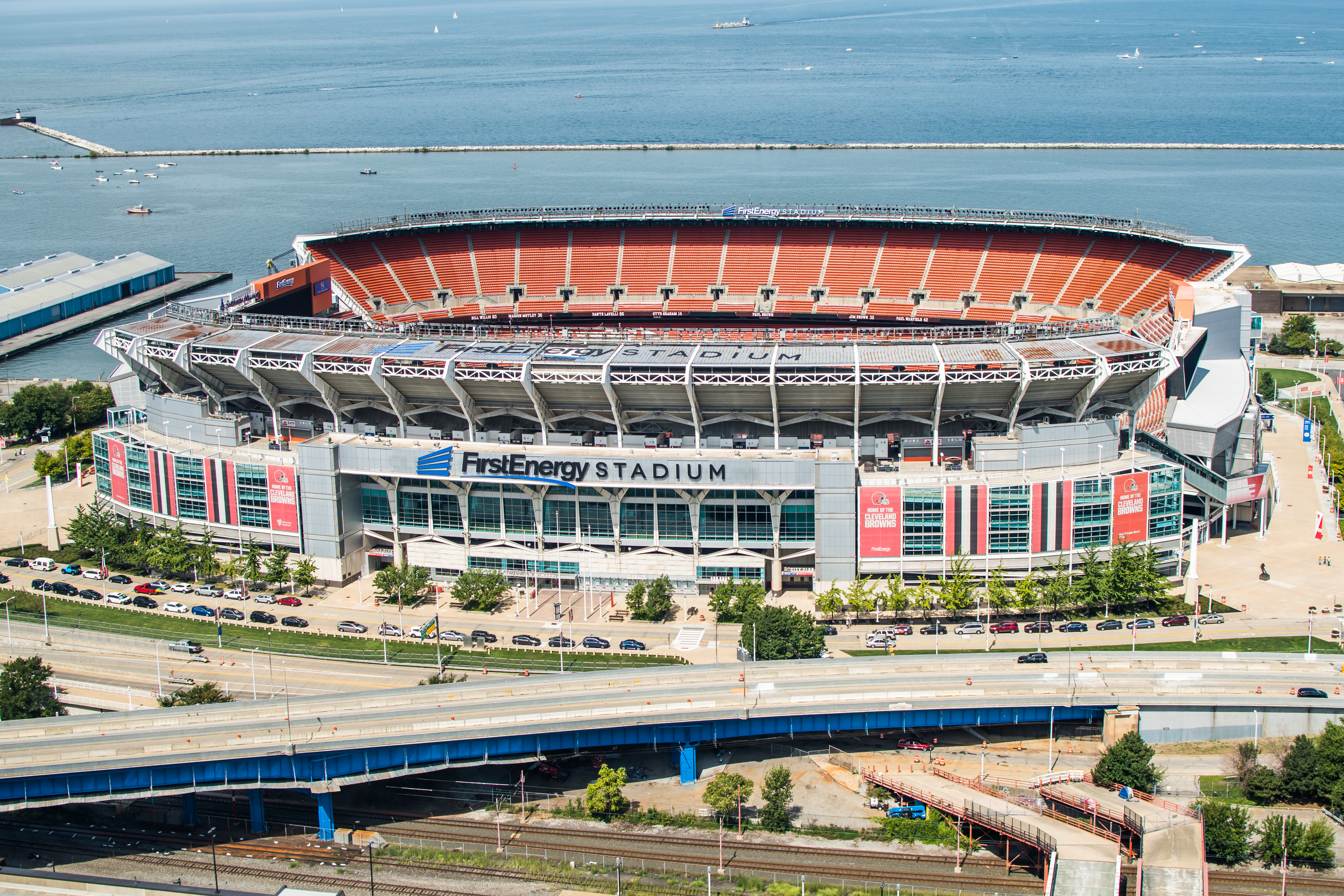
The Browns have played their home games at Cleveland Browns Stadium since 1999.

The Cleveland Browns are a professional American football franchise based in Cleveland, Ohio. They are a member of the North Division of the American Football Conference (AFC) in the National Football League (NFL). The team began playing in 1946 as a charter member of the All-America Football Conference (AAFC), and joined the NFL as part of the AAFC–NFL merger in 1950. The team played their home games at Cleveland Stadium from 1946 to 1995 before moving to Cleveland Browns Stadium, where they have played since 1999. The Browns did not play from 1996 to 1998 when the team's owner, Art Modell, moved the team to Baltimore, Maryland and formed the Baltimore Ravens. The team was reactivated under new ownership in Cleveland in 1999. The Browns are currently owned by Jimmy Haslam III.

There have been 19 non-interim head coaches for the Browns franchise. Their first head coach was Paul Brown, who coached for 17 complete seasons. Brown is also the franchise's all-time leader for the most regular season games coached (214), the most regular season game wins (158), the most playoffs games coached (14), and the most playoff game wins (9). Brown is the only Browns head coach to win an AAFC championship, winning four. Brown and Blanton Collier have led the Browns to NFL championships. Brown won the Sporting News NFL Coach of the Year three times, the United Press International (UPI) NFL Coach of the Year once, and was elected into the Pro Football Hall of Fame as a coach. Five coaches have won Coach of the Year awards: Brown (1949, 1951, 1953, 1957), Forrest Gregg (1976), Sam Rutigliano (1979, 1980), Marty Schottenheimer (1986), and Kevin Stefanski (2020, 2023).

Since their reactivation in 1999, the Browns have had significant turnover at the head coaching position. Eleven men have coached the Browns since 1999, and only two have reached the postseason: Butch Davis (2002) and Stefanski (2020 and 2023).

== Key ==
#	Number of coaches (Note: A running total of the number of coaches of the Browns. Thus, any coach who has two or more terms as head coach is only counted once. Interim coaches are not included.)
GC	Games coached
W	Wins
L	Losses
T	Ties
Win%	Winning percentage
†	Elected into the Pro Football Hall of Fame as a coach
‡	Elected into the Pro Football Hall of Fame as a player
*	Spent entire NFL head coaching career with the Browns

== Coaches ==
Note: Statistics are accurate through the 2025 NFL season.

#	Image	Name	Term (Note: Each year is linked to an article about that particular NFL season.)			Regular season					Playoffs				Accomplishments	Ref.
#	Image	Name	Yrs	First	Last	GC	W	L	T	W%	GC	W	L	W%	Accomplishments	Ref.
1		Paul Brown †	17	1946	1962	214	158	48	8	.767	14	9	5	.643	4 AAFC championships (1946, 1947, 1948, 1949); 3 NFL championships (1950, 1954, 1955); 7 NFL Conference championships (1950, 1951, 1952, 1953, 1954, 1955, 1957); 3 AAFC Western Division championships (1946, 1947, 1948); 4 AAFC Playoff berths 8 NFL Playoff berths 3 SN NFL Coach of the Year (1949, 1951, and 1953); 1 UPI NFL Coach of the Year (1957)	
2		Blanton Collier*	8	1963	1970	112	76	34	2	.691	7	3	4	.429	1 NFL championship (1964); 4 Eastern conference champions (1964, 1965, 1968, 1969); 3 Century Division Champions (1967,1968, 1969); 5 Playoff berths	
3		Nick Skorich	4	1971	1974	56	30	24	2	.556	2	0	2	.000	1 AFC Central Championship (1971); 2 Playoff berths	
4		Forrest Gregg ‡	3	1975	1977	41	18	23	0	.439	—				1 AP NFL Coach of the Year (1976)	
–		Dick Modzelewski* (Note: Gregg was fired thirteen games into the 1977 season. Modzelewski served as interim head coach for the remaining game.)	1	1977		1	0	1	0	.000	—					
5		Sam Rutigliano*	7	1978	1984	97	47	50	0	.485	2	0	2	.000	1 AFC Central Championship (1980); 2 Playoff berths 2 UPI NFL Coach of the Year (1979, 1980)	
6		Marty Schottenheimer (Note: Rutigliano was fired eight games into the 1984 season. Schottenheimer served as interim head coach for the remaining eight games before being promoted to full-time head coach.)	5	1984	1988	71	44	27	0	.620	6	2	4	.333	3 AFC Central Championship (1985, 1986, 1987); 4 Playoff berths 1 UPI NFL Coach of the Year (1986)	
7		Bud Carson*	2	1989	1990	25	11	13	1	.458	2	1	1	.500	1 AFC Central Championship (1989); 1 Playoff berth	
–		Jim Shofner* (Note: Carson was fired nine games into the 1990 season. Shofner served as interim head coach for the remaining seven games.)	1	1990		7	1	6	0	.143	—					
8		Bill Belichick	5	1991	1995	80	36	44	0	.450	2	1	1	.500	1 Playoff berth	
		— (Note: The Browns did not play from 1996 to 1998 due to events in the Cleveland Browns relocation controversy.)	3	1996	1998	—					—					
9		Chris Palmer*	2	1999	2000	32	5	27	0	.156	—					
10		Butch Davis*	4	2001	2004	59	24	35	0	.407	1	0	1	.000	1 Playoff berth	
–		Terry Robiskie (Note: Davis resigned eleven games into the 2004 season. Robiskie served as interim head coach for the remaining five games.)	1	2004		5	1	4	0	.200	—					
11		Romeo Crennel	4	2005	2008	64	24	40	0	.375	—					
12		Eric Mangini	2	2009	2010	32	10	22	0	.313	—					
13		Pat Shurmur	2	2011	2012	32	9	23	0	.281	—					
14		Rob Chudzinski*	1	2013		16	4	12	0	.250	—					
15		Mike Pettine*	2	2014	2015	32	10	22	0	.313	—					
16		Hue Jackson	3	2016	2018	40	3	36	1	.088	—					
–		Gregg Williams (Note: Jackson was fired eight games into the 2018 season. Williams served as interim head coach for the remaining eight games.)	1	2018		8	5	3	0	.625	—					
17		Freddie Kitchens*	1	2019		16	6	10	0	.375	—					
18		Kevin Stefanski (Note: During the 2020–21 NFL playoffs, Stefanski tested positive for COVID-19. Special teams coordinator Mike Priefer served as the acting head coach in the wild-card round against the Pittsburgh Steelers, winning the game. Stefanski tested positive during Week 15 of the 2021 season, with Priefer again serving as acting head coach against the Las Vegas Raiders, losing the game.)	6	2020	2025	101	45	56	0	.446	3	1	2	.333	2 Playoff berths 2 AP NFL Coach of the Year (2020, 2023)	
19		Todd Monken*	1	2026	present	8	5	3	0	.625	—					

== Notes ==
General

- "History: All-Time Head Coaches". Cleveland Browns. NFL Enterprises LLC. Archived from the original on January 23, 2013.
- "Cleveland Browns Franchise Encyclopedia". Pro Football Reference. Sports Reference LLC. Archived from the original on October 18, 2013.

Specific
