= List of Kansas City Chiefs head coaches =

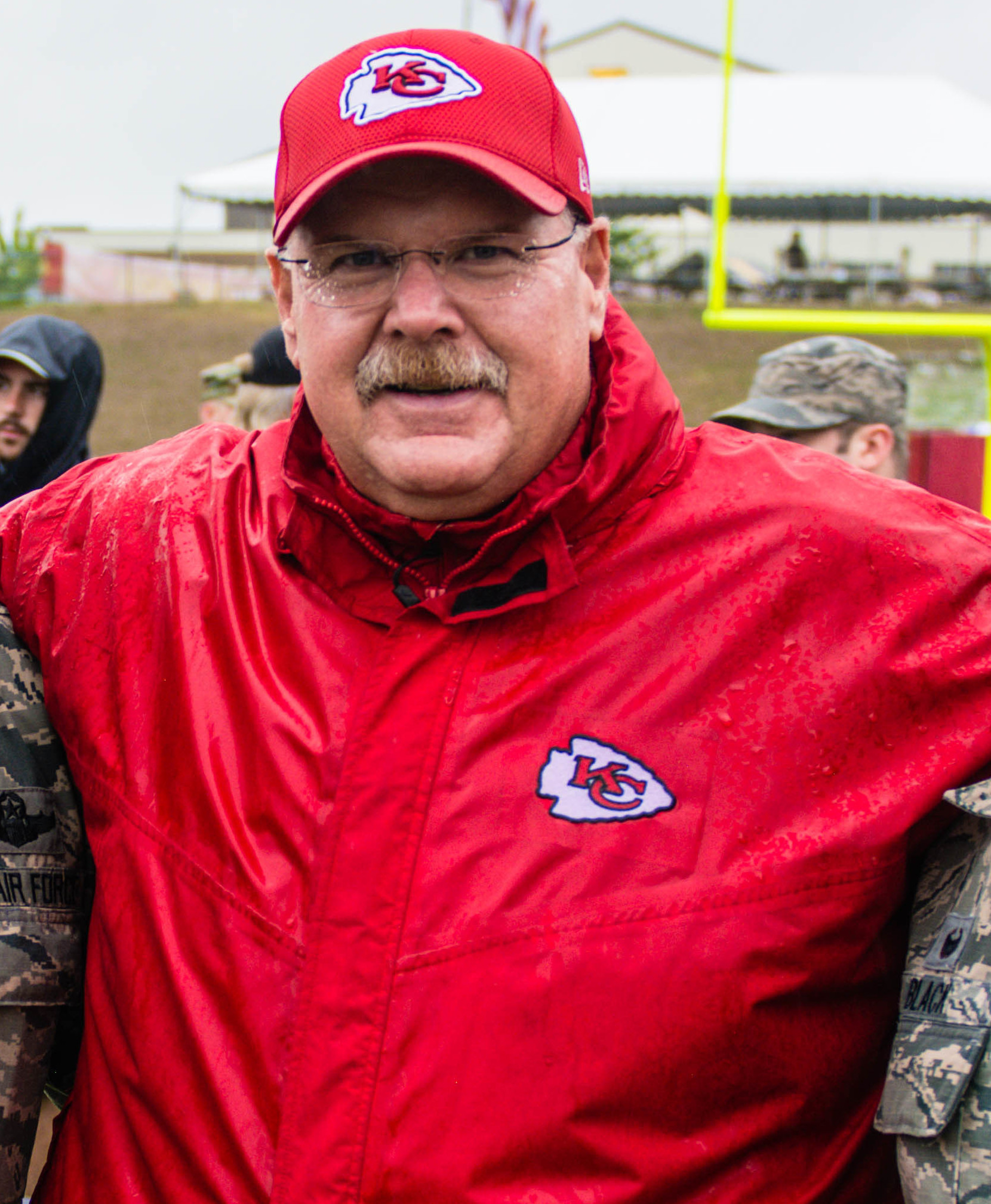
Current Chiefs head coach Andy Reid

The Kansas City Chiefs of the National Football League (NFL) have had 13 head coaches in their franchise history. The franchise was founded in 1960 by Lamar Hunt and were known as the Dallas Texans when the team was located in Dallas, Texas. The team relocated to Kansas City, Missouri and were renamed the Chiefs in 1963. The franchise was a charter member of the American Football League (AFL) before entering into the NFL following the AFL-NFL merger.

Hank Stram, the team's first head coach, led the Chiefs to three AFL championship victories and two appearances in the Super Bowl. Stram was the team's longest-tenured head coach, holding the position from 1960 to 1974. Marty Schottenheimer was hired in 1989 and led Kansas City to seven playoff appearances in his ten seasons as head coach. Of the thirteen Chiefs coaches, Hank Stram, Marv Levy, and Dick Vermeil have been elected into the Pro Football Hall of Fame. Seven head coaches have led the Chiefs to the playoffs, of those seven, only three won a game in the playoffs. Romeo Crennel, who coached the team for three games in 2011 and the entire 2012 season, is the team's shortest tenured head coach. He was fired following what was statistically the worst season in franchise history in 2012. Andy Reid has been the head coach since 2013. Following the Chiefs' Super Bowl championship in the 2019 season, Reid became the franchise leader in playoff wins.

== Key ==
#	Number of coaches (Note: A running total of the number of coaches of the Texans/Chiefs. Thus, any coach who has two or more terms as head coach is only counted once.)
Yrs	Years coached
First	First season coached
Last	Last season coached
GC	Games Coached
W	Wins
L	Loses
T	Ties
Win%	Win – Loss percentage
†	Elected into the Pro Football Hall of Fame as a coach
*	Spent entire NFL head coaching career with the Texans/Chiefs

== Coaches ==
Note: Statistics are accurate through the end of the 2025 NFL season.

#	Image	Name	Term (Note: Each year is linked to an article about that particular NFL season.)			Regular season					Playoffs			Accomplishments	Ref.
#	Image	Name	Yrs	First	Last	GC	W	L	T	Win%	GC	W	L	Accomplishments	Ref.
Dallas Texans
1		Hank Stram^{†} (Note: Hank Stram was head coach of the franchise when it was known as the Dallas Texans from 1960 to 1962, and remained with the franchise after relocation to Kansas City, Missouri.)	3	1960	1962	44	27	17	0	.614	1	1	0	Inducted Pro Football Hall of Fame (2003); 1 AFL Championship (1962); 1 AFL Western Championship (1962); 1 AFL Playoff Berth	
Kansas City Chiefs
–		Hank Stram^{†}	12	1963	1974	166	97	59	10	.614	7	4	3	1 Super Bowl Championship (IV); 2 AFL Championship (1966, 1969); 1 AFL Western Championship (1966); 1 AFL Playoff Berth; 1 UPI AFL Coach of the Year Award (1968); 1 Pro Football Weekly AFL Coach of the Year Award (1968)	
2		Paul Wiggin*	3	1975	1977 (Note: Paul Wiggin was fired after seven games in the 1977 season and was replaced by Tom Bettis for the remainder of the season.)	35	11	24	0	.314	—				
3		Tom Bettis*	1	1977		7	1	6	0	.143	—				
4		Marv Levy^{†}	5	1978	1982	73	31	42	0	.425	—			Inducted Pro Football Hall of Fame (2001)	
5		John Mackovic*	4	1983	1986	64	30	34	0	.469	1	0	1	1 Playoff Berth	
6		Frank Gansz*	2	1987	1988	31	8	22	1	.274	—				
7		Marty Schottenheimer	10	1989	1998	160	101	58	1	.634	10	3	7	3 AFC West Championships (1993, 1995, 1997); 7 Playoff Berths; 1 UPI NFL Coach of the Year (1995)	
8		Gunther Cunningham*	2	1999	2000	32	16	16	0	.500	—				
9		Dick Vermeil†	5	2001	2005	80	44	36	0	.550	1	0	1	Inducted Pro Football Hall of Fame (2022); 1 AFC West Championship (2003); 1 Playoff Berth; 1 Maxwell Football Club NFL Coach of the Year (2003)	
10		Herm Edwards	3	2006	2008	48	15	33	0	.313	1	0	1	1 Playoff Berth	
11		Todd Haley*	3	2009	2011 (Note: After 13 games of the 2011 season, with the Chiefs at 5–8, Haley was fired as head coach and replaced by defensive coordinator Romeo Crennel on an interim basis, however following the 2011 season Crennel was named permanent head coach.)	45	19	26	0	.422	1	0	1	1 AFC West Championship (2010); 1 Playoff Berth	
12		Romeo Crennel	2	2011	2012	19	4	15	0	.211	—				
13		Andy Reid	13	2013 – present		213	149	64	0	.700	26	18	8	3 Super Bowl Championships (LIV, LVII, LVIII); 5 AFC Championships (2019, 2020, 2022, 2023, 2024); 9 AFC West Championships (2016–2024); 11 Playoff Berths	
