= Gary Hoffman (American football coach) =

American football player and coach (born 1944)

Biographical details
- Born: February 22, 1944 (age 82)

Playing career
- 1965: Westmar

Coaching career (HC unless noted)
- 1966–1968: West Lyon HS (IA)
- 1969–1970: Sleepy Eye HS (MN)
- 1971–1972: Farmington HS (MN)
- 1973–1975: Sioux Falls
- 1976: Washington HS (SD)
- 1977–1978: Augustana (SD) (assistant)
- 1980–1986: South Dakota State (assistant)
- 1987–1992: Saskatchewan Roughriders (assistant)
- 1993–1996: BC Lions (assistant)
- 1997: Saskatchewan Roughriders (assistant)
- 1998–1999: Winnipeg Blue Bombers (assistant)
- 1998: Winnipeg Blue Bombers (interim HC)
- 2000–2004: Spearfish HS (SD)

Head coaching record
- Overall: 11–17 (college)

Gary Hoffman (born February 22, 1944) is an American former gridiron football player and coach. He served as the interim head coach of the Winnipeg Blue Bombers of the Canadian Football League in 1998 He also served as the head football coach at Sioux Falls College from 1973 to 1975, compiling a record of 11–17. Hoffman retired from coach in 2004.

== Head coaching record ==
=== College ===
Year	Team	Overall	Conference	Standing	Bowl/playoffs
Sioux Falls Braves (Tri-State Conference) (1973–1975)
1973	Sioux Falls	5–5	2–3	T–3rd	
1974	Sioux Falls	4–5	2–3	T–3rd	
1975	Sioux Falls	2–7	0–4	5th	
Sioux Falls:		11–17	4–10		
Total:		11–17			
