= List of Grey Cup champions =

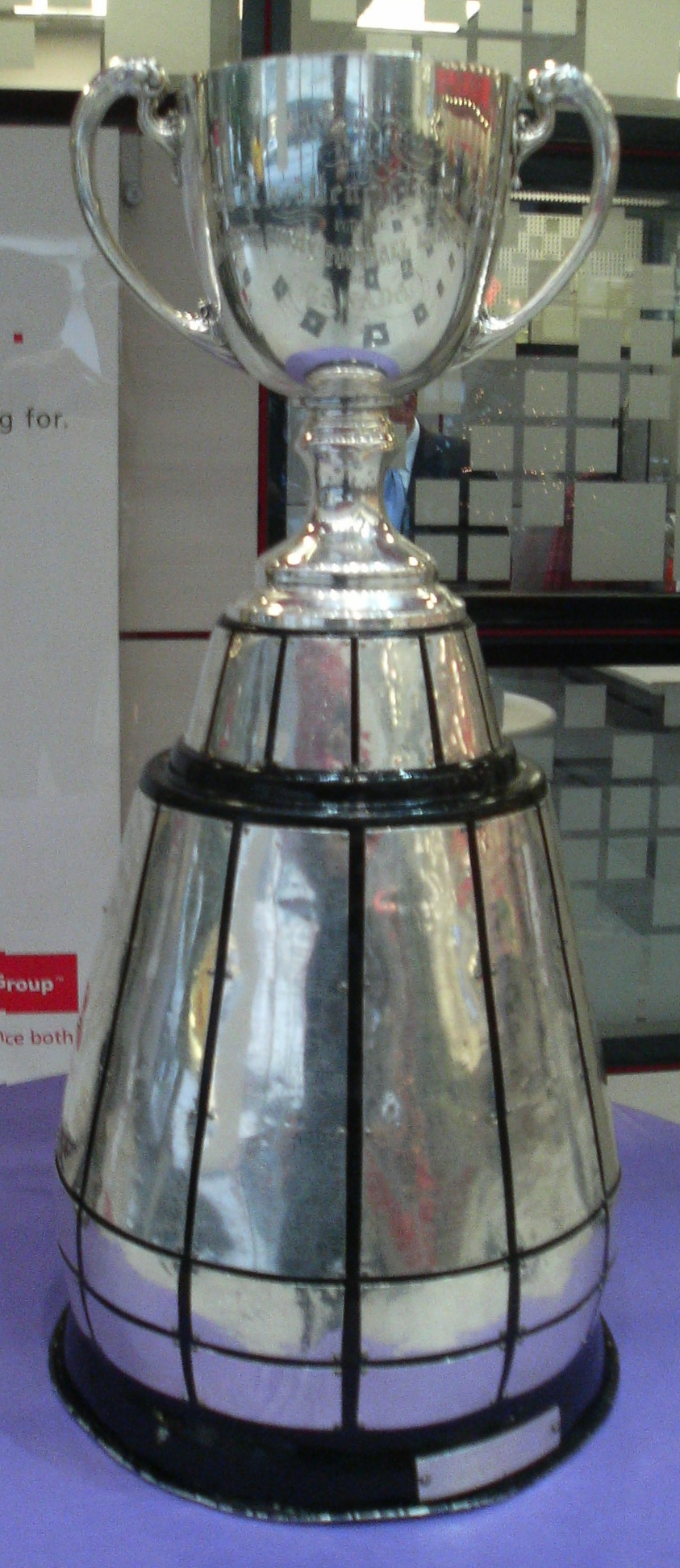
The Grey Cup

The Grey Cup is the championship of the Canadian Football League (CFL) and the trophy awarded to the victorious team. The trophy is named after Albert Grey, the Governor General of Canada from 1904 until 1911. He donated the trophy to the Canadian Rugby Union in 1909 to recognize the top amateur rugby football team in Canada. By this time Canadian football had become markedly different from the rugby football from which it developed. Although it was originally intended to be awarded only to amateur teams (like the Stanley Cup), over time, the Grey Cup became the property of the Canadian Football League as it evolved into a professional football league. Amateur teams ceased competing for the Cup by 1954; since 1965, the top amateur teams, playing in U Sports, have competed for the Vanier Cup.

The Grey Cup game is Canada's largest annual sports and television event, regularly drawing a Canadian viewing audience of about 4 million. Two awards are given for play in the game, Most Valuable Player and the Dick Suderman Trophy as most valuable Canadian player. As a member of the Winnipeg Blue Bombers, Andrew Harris was the first player to win both the Dick Suderman Trophy and the Grey Cup Most Valuable Player the same year, which he did in 2019.

The Winnipeg Blue Bombers have made the most appearances (29), while the Toronto Argonauts have won the most championships (19) and have the best record in the Grey Cup composite standings (19–6). Despite the CFL's brief U.S. expansion era in the mid-1990s, the Grey Cup has never been played outside of Canada. The Baltimore Stallions were the only American team to appear in the Grey Cup (twice, losing in 1994 and winning the following year).

Although the first Grey Cup game was in 1909, none were played from 1916 to 1919 or in 2020, thus the most recent final was the 113th Grey Cup game which was played on November 15, 2026, at McMahon Stadium in Calgary. The Edmonton Elks won their fifteenth championship in franchise history, defeating the Montreal Alouettes.

== Results ==
Championships table key and summary
(1961–1981)	(1981-1994 & 1996-present)
Western Football Conference	West Division
Eastern Football Conference	East Division

- Numbers in parentheses indicate the cumulative number of times that a team has won the Grey Cup.

Game	Date	Winning team	Score	Losing team	Venue	City	Attendance
1st	December 4, 1909	University of Toronto Varsity Blues (1)	26–6	Toronto Parkdale Canoe Club	Rosedale Field	Toronto	3,807
2nd	November 26, 1910	University of Toronto Varsity Blues (2)	16–7	Hamilton Tigers	AAA Grounds	Hamilton	12,000
3rd	November 25, 1911	University of Toronto Varsity Blues (3)	14–7	Toronto Argonauts	Varsity Stadium	Toronto	13,687
4th	November 30, 1912	Hamilton Alerts (1)	11–4	Toronto Argonauts	AAA Grounds	Hamilton	5,337
5th	November 29, 1913	Hamilton Tigers (1)	44–2	Toronto Parkdale Canoe Club	AAA Grounds	Hamilton	2,100
6th	December 5, 1914	Toronto Argonauts (1)	14–2	University of Toronto Varsity Blues	Varsity Stadium	Toronto	10,500
7th	November 20, 1915	Hamilton Tigers (2)	13–7	Toronto Rowing & Athletic Association	Varsity Stadium	Toronto	2,808
—	1916	Not held due to World War I			—	—	—
—	1917	Not held due to World War I			—	—	—
—	1918	Not held due to World War I			—	—	—
—	1919	Cancelled due to a rules dispute with the Canadian Rugby Union			—	—	—
8th	December 4, 1920	University of Toronto Varsity Blues (4)	16–3	Toronto Argonauts	Varsity Stadium	Toronto	10,088
9th	December 3, 1921	Toronto Argonauts (2)	23–0	Edmonton Eskimos	Varsity Stadium	Toronto	9,558
10th	December 2, 1922	Queen's University (1)	13–1	Edmonton Elks	Richardson Stadium	Kingston	4,700
11th	December 1, 1923	Queen's University (2)	54–0	Regina Rugby Club	Varsity Stadium	Toronto	8,629
12th	November 29, 1924	Queen's University (3)	11–3	Toronto Balmy Beach Beachers	Varsity Stadium	Toronto	5,978
13th	December 5, 1925	Ottawa Senators (1)	24–1	Winnipeg Tammany Tigers	Lansdowne Park	Ottawa	6,900
14th	December 4, 1926	Ottawa Senators (2)	10–7	University of Toronto Varsity Blues	Varsity Stadium	Toronto	8,276
15th	November 26, 1927	Toronto Balmy Beach Beachers (1)	9–6	Hamilton Tigers	Varsity Stadium	Toronto	13,676
16th	December 1, 1928	Hamilton Tigers (3)	30–0	Regina Roughriders	AAA Grounds	Hamilton	4,767
17th	November 30, 1929	Hamilton Tigers (4)	14–3	Regina Roughriders	AAA Grounds	Hamilton	1,906
18th	December 6, 1930	Toronto Balmy Beach Beachers (2)	11–6	Regina Roughriders	Varsity Stadium	Toronto	3,914
19th	December 5, 1931	Montreal AAA Winged Wheelers (1)	22–0	Regina Roughriders	Molson Stadium	Montreal	5,112
20th	December 3, 1932	Hamilton Tigers (5)	25–6	Regina Roughriders	AAA Grounds	Hamilton	4,806
21st	December 9, 1933	Toronto Argonauts (3)	4–3	Sarnia Imperials	Athletic Park	Sarnia	2,751
22nd	November 24, 1934	Sarnia Imperials (1)	20–12	Regina Roughriders	Varsity Stadium	Toronto	8,900
23rd	December 7, 1935	Winnipeg Rugby Football Club (1)	18–12	Hamilton Tigers	AAA Grounds	Hamilton	6,405
24th	December 5, 1936	Sarnia Imperials (2)	26–20	Ottawa Rough Riders	Varsity Stadium	Toronto	5,883
25th	December 11, 1937	Toronto Argonauts (4)	4–3	Winnipeg Blue Bombers	Varsity Stadium	Toronto	11,522
26th	December 10, 1938	Toronto Argonauts (5)	30–7	Winnipeg Blue Bombers	Varsity Stadium	Toronto	18,778
27th	December 9, 1939	Winnipeg Blue Bombers (2)	8–7	Ottawa Rough Riders	Lansdowne Park	Ottawa	11,738
28th (Note: Played as a two-game series; Ottawa won the first game 8–2, and the second game 12–5, winning by an aggregate score of 20–7)	November 30, 1940	Ottawa Rough Riders (3)	20–7 (agg.)	Toronto Balmy Beach Beachers	Varsity Stadium	Toronto	4,998
28th	December 7, 1940	Ottawa Rough Riders (3)	20–7 (agg.)	Toronto Balmy Beach Beachers	Lansdowne Park	Ottawa	1,700
29th	November 29, 1941	Winnipeg Blue Bombers (3)	18–16	Ottawa Rough Riders	Varsity Stadium	Toronto	19,065
30th	December 5, 1942	Toronto RCAF Hurricanes (1)	8–5	Winnipeg RCAF Bombers	Varsity Stadium	Toronto	12,455
31st	November 27, 1943	Hamilton Flying Wildcats (1)	23–14	Winnipeg RCAF Bombers	Varsity Stadium	Toronto	16,423
32nd	November 25, 1944	St. Hyacinthe–Donnacona Navy (1)	7–6	Hamilton Flying Wildcats	Civic Stadium	Hamilton	3,871
33rd	December 1, 1945	Toronto Argonauts (6)	35–0	Winnipeg Blue Bombers	Varsity Stadium	Toronto	18,660
34th	November 30, 1946	Toronto Argonauts (7)	28–6	Winnipeg Blue Bombers	Varsity Stadium	Toronto	18,960
35th	November 29, 1947	Toronto Argonauts (8)	10–9	Winnipeg Blue Bombers	Varsity Stadium	Toronto	18,660
36th	November 27, 1948	Calgary Stampeders (1)	12–7	Ottawa Rough Riders	Varsity Stadium	Toronto	20,013
37th	November 26, 1949	Montreal Alouettes (1)	28–15	Calgary Stampeders	Varsity Stadium	Toronto	20,087
38th	November 25, 1950	Toronto Argonauts (9)	13–0	Winnipeg Blue Bombers	Varsity Stadium	Toronto	27,101
39th	November 24, 1951	Ottawa Rough Riders (4)	21–14	Saskatchewan Roughriders	Varsity Stadium	Toronto	27,341
40th	November 29, 1952	Toronto Argonauts (10)	21–11	Edmonton Eskimos	Varsity Stadium	Toronto	27,391
41st	November 28, 1953	Hamilton Tiger-Cats (1)	12–6	Winnipeg Blue Bombers	Varsity Stadium	Toronto	27,313
42nd	November 27, 1954	Edmonton Eskimos (1)	26–25	Montreal Alouettes	Varsity Stadium	Toronto	27,321
43rd	November 26, 1955	Edmonton Eskimos (2)	34–19	Montreal Alouettes	Empire Stadium	Vancouver	39,471
44th	November 24, 1956	Edmonton Eskimos (3)	50–27	Montreal Alouettes	Varsity Stadium	Toronto	27,425
45th	November 30, 1957	Hamilton Tiger-Cats (2)	32–7	Winnipeg Blue Bombers	Varsity Stadium	Toronto	27,051
46th	November 29, 1958	Winnipeg Blue Bombers (4)	35–28	Hamilton Tiger-Cats	Empire Stadium	Vancouver	36,567
47th	November 28, 1959	Winnipeg Blue Bombers (5)	21–7	Hamilton Tiger-Cats	Exhibition Stadium	Toronto	33,133
48th	November 26, 1960	Ottawa Rough Riders (5)	16–6	Edmonton Eskimos	Empire Stadium	Vancouver	38,102
49th	December 2, 1961	Winnipeg Blue Bombers (6)	21–14 (OT)	Hamilton Tiger-Cats	Exhibition Stadium	Toronto	32,651
50th	December 1–2, 1962 (Note: Game was suspended with 9:29 remaining in the fourth quarter due to extremely dense fog, and completed the next day)	Winnipeg Blue Bombers (7)	28–27	Hamilton Tiger-Cats	Exhibition Stadium	Toronto	32,655
51st	November 30, 1963	Hamilton Tiger-Cats (3)	21–10	BC Lions	Empire Stadium	Vancouver	36,461
52nd	November 28, 1964	BC Lions (1)	34–24	Hamilton Tiger-Cats	Exhibition Stadium	Toronto	32,655
53rd	November 27, 1965	Hamilton Tiger-Cats (4)	22–16	Winnipeg Blue Bombers	Exhibition Stadium	Toronto	32,655
54th	November 26, 1966	Saskatchewan Roughriders (1)	29–14	Ottawa Rough Riders	Empire Stadium	Vancouver	36,553
55th	December 2, 1967	Hamilton Tiger-Cats (5)	24–1	Saskatchewan Roughriders	Lansdowne Park	Ottawa	31,358
56th	November 30, 1968	Ottawa Rough Riders (6)	24–21	Calgary Stampeders	Exhibition Stadium	Toronto	32,655
57th	November 30, 1969	Ottawa Rough Riders (7)	29–11	Saskatchewan Roughriders	Autostade	Montreal	33,172
58th	November 28, 1970	Montreal Alouettes (2)	23–10	Calgary Stampeders	Exhibition Stadium	Toronto	32,669
59th	November 28, 1971	Calgary Stampeders (2)	14–11	Toronto Argonauts	Empire Stadium	Vancouver	34,484
60th	December 3, 1972	Hamilton Tiger-Cats (6)	13–10	Saskatchewan Roughriders	Ivor Wynne Stadium	Hamilton	33,993
61st	November 25, 1973	Ottawa Rough Riders (8)	22–18	Edmonton Eskimos	Exhibition Stadium	Toronto	36,653
62nd	November 24, 1974	Montreal Alouettes (3)	20–7	Edmonton Eskimos	Empire Stadium	Vancouver	34,450
63rd	November 23, 1975	Edmonton Eskimos (4)	9–8	Montreal Alouettes	McMahon Stadium	Calgary	32,454
64th	November 28, 1976	Ottawa Rough Riders (9)	23–20	Saskatchewan Roughriders	Exhibition Stadium	Toronto	53,467
65th	November 27, 1977	Montreal Alouettes (4)	41–6	Edmonton Eskimos	Olympic Stadium	Montreal	68,205
66th	November 26, 1978	Edmonton Eskimos (5)	20–13	Montreal Alouettes	Exhibition Stadium	Toronto	54,386
67th	November 25, 1979	Edmonton Eskimos (6)	17–9	Montreal Alouettes	Olympic Stadium	Montreal	65,113
68th	November 23, 1980	Edmonton Eskimos (7)	48–10	Hamilton Tiger-Cats	Exhibition Stadium	Toronto	54,649
69th	November 22, 1981	Edmonton Eskimos (8)	26–23	Ottawa Rough Riders	Olympic Stadium	Montreal	53,307
70th	November 28, 1982	Edmonton Eskimos (9)	32–16	Toronto Argonauts	Exhibition Stadium	Toronto	54,741
71st	November 27, 1983	Toronto Argonauts (11)	18–17	BC Lions	BC Place	Vancouver	59,345
72nd	November 18, 1984	Winnipeg Blue Bombers (8)	47–17	Hamilton Tiger-Cats	Commonwealth Stadium	Edmonton	60,081
73rd	November 24, 1985	BC Lions (2)	37–24	Hamilton Tiger-Cats	Olympic Stadium	Montreal	56,723
74th	November 30, 1986	Hamilton Tiger-Cats (7)	39–15	Edmonton Eskimos	BC Place	Vancouver	59,621
75th	November 29, 1987	Edmonton Eskimos (10)	38–36	Toronto Argonauts	BC Place	Vancouver	59,478
76th	November 27, 1988	Winnipeg Blue Bombers (9)	22–21	BC Lions	Lansdowne Park	Ottawa	50,604
77th	November 26, 1989	Saskatchewan Roughriders (2)	43–40	Hamilton Tiger-Cats	SkyDome	Toronto	54,088
78th	November 25, 1990	Winnipeg Blue Bombers (10)	50–11	Edmonton Eskimos	BC Place	Vancouver	46,969
79th	November 24, 1991	Toronto Argonauts (12)	36–21	Calgary Stampeders	Winnipeg Stadium	Winnipeg	51,985
80th	November 29, 1992	Calgary Stampeders (3)	24–10	Winnipeg Blue Bombers	SkyDome	Toronto	45,863
81st	November 28, 1993	Edmonton Eskimos (11)	33–23	Winnipeg Blue Bombers	McMahon Stadium	Calgary	50,035
82nd	November 27, 1994	BC Lions (3)	26–23	Baltimore Football Club	BC Place	Vancouver	55,097
83rd	November 19, 1995	Baltimore Stallions (1)	37–20	Calgary Stampeders	Taylor Field	Regina	52,564
84th	November 24, 1996	Toronto Argonauts (13)	43–37	Edmonton Eskimos	Ivor Wynne Stadium	Hamilton	38,595
85th	November 16, 1997	Toronto Argonauts (14)	47–23	Saskatchewan Roughriders	Commonwealth Stadium	Edmonton	60,431
86th	November 22, 1998	Calgary Stampeders (4)	26–24	Hamilton Tiger-Cats	Winnipeg Stadium	Winnipeg	34,157
87th	November 28, 1999	Hamilton Tiger-Cats (8)	32–21	Calgary Stampeders	BC Place	Vancouver	45,118
88th	November 26, 2000	BC Lions (4)	28–26	Montreal Alouettes	McMahon Stadium	Calgary	43,822
89th	November 25, 2001	Calgary Stampeders (5)	27–19	Winnipeg Blue Bombers	Olympic Stadium	Montreal	65,255
90th	November 24, 2002	Montreal Alouettes (5)	25–16	Edmonton Eskimos	Commonwealth Stadium	Edmonton	62,531
91st	November 16, 2003	Edmonton Eskimos (12)	34–22	Montreal Alouettes	Taylor Field	Regina	50,909
92nd	November 21, 2004	Toronto Argonauts (15)	27–19	BC Lions	Frank Clair Stadium	Ottawa	51,242
93rd	November 27, 2005	Edmonton Eskimos (13)	38–35 (OT)	Montreal Alouettes	BC Place	Vancouver	59,127
94th	November 19, 2006	BC Lions (5)	25–14	Montreal Alouettes	Canad Inns Stadium	Winnipeg	44,786
95th	November 25, 2007	Saskatchewan Roughriders (3)	23–19	Winnipeg Blue Bombers	Rogers Centre	Toronto	52,230
96th	November 23, 2008	Calgary Stampeders (6)	22–14	Montreal Alouettes	Olympic Stadium	Montreal	66,308
97th	November 29, 2009	Montreal Alouettes (6)	28–27	Saskatchewan Roughriders	McMahon Stadium	Calgary	46,020
98th	November 28, 2010	Montreal Alouettes (7)	21–18	Saskatchewan Roughriders	Commonwealth Stadium	Edmonton	63,317
99th	November 27, 2011	BC Lions (6)	34–23	Winnipeg Blue Bombers	BC Place	Vancouver	54,313
100th	November 25, 2012	Toronto Argonauts (16)	35–22	Calgary Stampeders	Rogers Centre	Toronto	53,208
101st	November 24, 2013	Saskatchewan Roughriders (4)	45–23	Hamilton Tiger-Cats	Taylor Field	Regina	44,710
102nd	November 30, 2014	Calgary Stampeders (7)	20–16	Hamilton Tiger-Cats	BC Place	Vancouver	52,056
103rd	November 29, 2015	Edmonton Eskimos (14)	26–20	Ottawa Redblacks	Investors Group Field	Winnipeg	36,634
104th	November 27, 2016	Ottawa Redblacks (10)	39–33 (OT)	Calgary Stampeders	BMO Field	Toronto	33,421
105th	November 26, 2017	Toronto Argonauts (17)	27–24	Calgary Stampeders	TD Place Stadium	Ottawa	36,154
106th	November 25, 2018	Calgary Stampeders (8)	27–16	Ottawa Redblacks	Commonwealth Stadium	Edmonton	55,819
107th	November 24, 2019	Winnipeg Blue Bombers (11)	33–12	Hamilton Tiger-Cats	McMahon Stadium	Calgary	35,439
—	November 22, 2020	Cancelled due to the COVID-19 pandemic			—	—	—
108th	December 12, 2021	Winnipeg Blue Bombers (12)	33–25 (OT)	Hamilton Tiger-Cats	Tim Hortons Field	Hamilton	26,324
109th	November 20, 2022	Toronto Argonauts (18)	24–23	Winnipeg Blue Bombers	Mosaic Stadium	Regina	33,330
110th	November 19, 2023	Montreal Alouettes (8)	28–24	Winnipeg Blue Bombers	Tim Hortons Field	Hamilton	28,808
111th	November 17, 2024	Toronto Argonauts (19)	41–24	Winnipeg Blue Bombers	BC Place	Vancouver	52,439
112th	November 16, 2025	Saskatchewan Roughriders (5)	25–17	Montreal Alouettes	Princess Auto Stadium	Winnipeg	32,343
113th	November 15, 2026	Edmonton Elks (15)	37–30	Montreal Alouettes	McMahon Stadium	Calgary	32,419
114th	November 7, 2027				Mosaic Stadium	Regina	

== Team records ==
Although the official website of the Hamilton Tiger-Cats considers them as the same team, the Tiger-Cats, Hamilton Alerts, Hamilton Tigers and Hamilton Flying Wildcats are all listed separately because, when the latter three were active, the teams competed as separate franchises. The Tigers and Flying Wildcats merged in 1950 to create the Tiger-Cats.

As defined in the 2025 CFL Guide & Record Book, for historical record purposes and by the current Montreal Alouettes request, all Montreal Football Clubs since 1946 are the same entity. There was 1 period of inactivity from 1987 to 1995. The team was called Montreal Alouettes from 1946 to 1982. The day after the Alouettes folded, a new team called Montreal Concordes was born. In 1986, Concordes changed their name back to Montreal Alouettes. In 1987, the Montreal Alouettes folded again after playing the pre-season. In 1996, the Grey Cup Champion Baltimore Stallions moved to Montreal to revive the Montreal Alouettes team. The Baltimore team from 1994-1995 is not considered part of the Montreal Alouettes' history.

As defined in the 2025 CFL Guide & Record Book, for historical record purposes and by the current Ottawa Redblacks' request, the Ottawa Football Clubs are considered to be a single entity since 1876 with two periods of inactivity (1997–2001 and 2006–2013). Consequently, figures from the Ottawa Football Club (1876–1898), Ottawa Rough Riders (1899–1919, 1931–1996), Ottawa Senators (1920–1930), Ottawa Renegades (2002–2005), and Ottawa Redblacks (2014–present) are included as one.

Toronto is the city with the most wins, 26, followed by Hamilton (15), Edmonton (15), Winnipeg (12), Ottawa (10), Montreal (10), Calgary (8), Vancouver (6), Regina (5), Kingston (3), Sarnia (2) and Baltimore (1).

=== Active teams ===
Appearances	Team	Wins	Losses	Win %	Last win
29	Winnipeg Blue Bombers (Note: Includes record as Winnipeg Rugby Football Club)	12	17	.414	2021
25	Toronto Argonauts	19	6	.760	2024
24	Edmonton Elks (Note: Includes record as Edmonton Eskimos)	15	9	.625	2026
22	Hamilton Tiger-Cats	8	14	.364	1999
21	Montreal Alouettes	8	13	.381	2023
20	Saskatchewan Roughriders (Note: Includes record as Regina Rugby Club and Regina Roughriders)	5	15	.250	2025
18	Ottawa Redblacks (Note: Includes record as Ottawa Senators and Ottawa Rough Riders)	10	8	.556	2016
17	Calgary Stampeders	8	9	.471	2018
10	BC Lions	6	4	.600	2011

=== Defunct and amateur teams ===
Appearances	Team	Wins	Losses	Win %
8	Hamilton Tigers	5	3	.625
6	University of Toronto Varsity Blues	4	2	.667
4	Toronto Balmy Beach Beachers	2	2	.500
3	Queen's University	3	0	1.000
3	Sarnia Imperials	2	1	.667
2	Baltimore Stallions	1	1	.500
2	Hamilton Flying Wildcats	1	1	.500
2	Edmonton Eskimos/Elks	0	2	.000
2	Toronto Parkdale Canoe Club	0	2	.000
2	Winnipeg RCAF Bombers	0	2	.000
1	Hamilton Alerts	1	0	1.000
1	Montreal AAA Winged Wheelers	1	0	1.000
1	St. Hyacinthe–Donnacona Navy	1	0	1.000
1	Toronto RCAF Hurricanes	1	0	1.000
1	Toronto Rowing and Athletic Association	0	1	.000
1	Winnipeg Tammany Tigers	0	1	.000

== See also ==
- Canadian Dominion Football Championship
- Grey Cup Most Valuable Player
- Dick Suderman Trophy (Most Valuable Canadian)
- List of Canadian Football League seasons
- List of Grey Cup-winning head coaches
