= 1973 CFL draft =

Canadian football draft

The 1973 CFL draft composed of nine rounds where 93 Canadian football players were chosen from eligible Canadian universities and, for the first time, Canadian players playing in the NCAA. Prior to 1973, teams were given exclusive signing privileges to Canadian players who attended U.S. schools based on the territory he was domiciled. After the draft was expanded to include NCAA schools, teams were also permitted to exempt from the draft and select players from their area, regardless of where they attended school.

== Territorial Exemptions ==
Pick #	CFL team	Player	Position	University
-	Montreal Alouettes	Pat Bonnett	T	Idaho State
-	Ottawa Rough Riders	Donn Smith	T	Purdue
-	Toronto Argonauts	Louis Clare	TB	Minnesota
-	Toronto Argonauts	Peter Muller	TE	Western Illinois
-	Hamilton Tiger-Cats	George Milosevic	E	Cornell
-	Hamilton Tiger-Cats	Bob Macoritti	K	Wooster
-	Winnipeg Blue Bombers	Roy Albertson	T	Simon Fraser
-	Winnipeg Blue Bombers	Wayne Ducharme	TB	Bowling Green
-	Saskatchewan Roughriders	Terry Bolych	LB	Weber State
-	Saskatchewan Roughriders	Andy McLeon	LB	Alberta
-	Calgary Stampeders	Tom Forzani	WR	Utah State
-	Calgary Stampeders	Blaine Lamoreaux	LB	Washington State
-	Edmonton Eskimos	Joe Worobec	T	Drake
-	Edmonton Eskimos	Garry Adam	DT	Alberta
-	Edmonton Eskimos	Rick McKay	LB	North Dakota State
-	BC Lions	Harold Grozadanich	G	Boise State
-	BC Lions	Ross Clarkson	WR	Simon Fraser
-	BC Lions	Robbie Allen	T	Bishop's

== 1st round ==
1. British Columbia Lions Brian Sopatyk G Boise State

2. Toronto Argonauts Barry Finlay QB McMaster

3. Calgary Stampeders Mike Logan QB Eastern Michigan

4. Montreal Alouettes Pierre LeFebvre DB Saint Mary's

5. Montreal Alouettes Jacob Schwartzberg K Alberta

6. British Columbia Lions Slade Willis WR Drake

7. Edmonton Eskimos Brian Jones DE Alberta

8. Saskatchewan Roughriders Art Edgson DB Idaho State

9. Edmonton Eskimos Wayne Allison QB Waterloo Lutheran

== 2nd round ==
10. British Columbia Lions Paul Giroday LB California

11. Toronto Argonauts Greg Higson HB McMaster

12. Calgary Stampeders Paul Perras G McMaster

13. British Columbia Lions Bob Helman TB North Dakota State

14. Hamilton Tiger-Cats Ken Hass LB Moorhead

15. Winnipeg Blue Bombers Dale Potter LB Ottawa

16. Ottawa Rough Riders Bruce McMillan TB Mount Allison

17. Saskatchewan Roughriders Ted Passmore TB Waterloo Lutheran

18. British Columbia Lions Cor Doret TB Toronto

== 3rd round ==
19. British Columbia Lions Joe Fabiani QB Western Ontario

20. Toronto Argonauts Chris Skopelianos DB Western Ontario

21. Calgary Stampeders Doug Thompson TB Otterbein

22. Edmonton Eskimos Bill Sherwood G Ottawa

23. Montreal Alouettes Stacey Coray DB Waterloo Lutheran

24. Winnipeg Blue Bombers Nick Kanakos DB Simon Fraser

25. Ottawa Rough Riders Roger Comartin DB Alberta

26. Saskatchewan Roughriders Gerry Harris TE Saskatchewan

27. Hamilton Tiger-Cats Gordon McColeman DT Waterloo Lutheran

== 4th round ==
28. British Columbia Lions Bill McGregor WR Simon Fraser

29. Toronto Argonauts Wayne Cuncic G Utah State

30. Calgary Stampeders Wayne Dunkley QB Toronto

31. Edmonton Eskimos Gerry Blacker TB Waterloo Lutheran

32. Montreal Alouettes Dave Mair TE Youngstown State

33. Winnipeg Blue Bombers Brian Warrender HB Queen's

34. Ottawa Rough Riders Jim Budge DB Western Ontario

35. Saskatchewan Roughriders Mike Ewachnuik DT Alberta

36. Hamilton Tiger-Cats Dave Kerr TB Western Ontario

== 5th round ==
37. British Columbia Lions Rudy Florio TB Youngstown State

38. Toronto Argonauts Brian Wetsell DE British Columbia

39. Calgary Stampeders Roan Kane WR Waterloo Lutheran

40. Edmonton Eskimos Dan Syratuik T McMaster

41. Montreal Alouettes Bob Whitfield T Guelph

42. Winnipeg Blue Bombers Paul Hilborn T Simon Fraser

43. Saskatchewan Roughriders Lee Benard DB Manitoba

44. Hamilton Tiger-Cats Jamie Spears TB McMaster

== 6th round ==
45. British Columbia Lions Terry Sharpe G Simon Fraser

46. Toronto Argonauts Bill Ross DE Western Ontario

47. Calgary Stampeders Allan Young G Montana State

48. Edmonton Eskimos Garry Duffy QB LaCrosse State

49. Montreal Alouettes John Cater DB Waterloo Lutheran

50. Winnipeg Blue Bombers Fred Clarke G Western Ontario

51. Saskatchewan Roughriders Don Savich TE Alberta

52. Hamilton Tiger-Cats Mike Telepchuk QB Guelph

== 7th round ==
53. British Columbia Lions Mike Flynn DT Waterloo

54. Toronto Argonauts Larry Jack DT New Brunswick

55. Calgary Stampeders Lorne Watters LB Calgary

56. Edmonton Eskimos Brian Jones DE Alberta

57. Montreal Alouettes Jim Drummond G Alberta

58. Winnipeg Blue Bombers Tim Crowe T Windsor

59. Saskatchewan Roughriders Nick Drakich T Windsor

60. Hamilton Tiger-Cats Brian Dunn DB Northwood

== 8th round ==
61. British Columbia Lions John Quinlan HB McMaster

62. Toronto Argonauts Bill Hunter DB Western Ontario

63. Calgary Stampeders Brock Fownes G Carleton

64. Edmonton Eskimos Doug Keene TB Eastern Michigan

65. Montreal Alouettes Mike Oulten DB Mount Allison

66. Winnipeg Blue Bombers Bart Evans G Manitoba

67. Saskatchewan Roughriders Merv Janzen DB Saskatchewan

68. Hamilton Tiger-Cats Peter de Montigny C Ottawa

== 9th round ==
69. British Columbia Lions Al Thomas DB Simon Fraser

70. Calgary Stampeders Denis Kelly QB Simon Fraser

71. Edmonton Eskimos Dave Campbell DB Queen's

72. Montreal Alouettes Ed McEachern LB Guelph

73. Winnipeg Blue Bombers Dean Samson DB Manitoba

74. Hamilton Tiger-Cats Bill Bunting LB Ottawa

75. Hamilton Tiger-Cats Jim Wakeman TB Windsor
