= Brian Jones (disambiguation) =

Brian Jones (1942–1969) was a multi-instrumentalist and founder of the Rolling Stones.

Brian Jones may also refer to:

== Sportsmen ==
=== American football ===
- Brian Jones (Canadian football linebacker) (born 1950), Canadian football linebacker
- Brian Jones (American football linebacker) (born 1968), American football linebacker and radio host
- Brian Jones (quarterback), (born 1980), American football quarterback
- Brian Jones (tight end) (born 1981), American football tight end
- Brian Jones (wide receiver) (born 1994), Canadian football wide receiver

=== Other sports ===
- Brian Jones (rugby union) (1935–2025), Wales international rugby union player
- Brian Jones (golfer) (born 1951), Australian golfer
- Brian Jones (sailor) (born 1959), New Zealand Olympic sailor
- Brian Jones (basketball, born 1971), American college basketball coach
- Brian Jones (basketball, born 1978), American basketball player
- Brian Jones (badminton) (born c. 1947), Welsh badminton player

== Others ==
- Brian Jones (activist), American actor, educator and activist from New York
- Brian Jones (aeronaut) (born 1947), English balloonist
- Brian Jay Jones (born 1967), American biographer
- Brian Jones (politician) (born 1968), member of the California State Senate
- Brian Jones (intelligence analyst) (1944–2012), British metallurgist and intelligence analyst
- Brian Jones (motorcycle designer) (1928–2001), British motorcycle designer
- Brian Jones (poet) (1938–2009), British poet
- Brian Jones (saxophonist) (1940–2026), English saxophonist, member of The Undertakers
- Brian Keith Jones (born 1947), Australian convicted child sex offender

== See also ==
- Bryan Jones (disambiguation)
