= List of current Canadian Football League announcers =

== East Division ==
Team	Play-by-play	Analyst	Sideline	Flagship Station
Hamilton	Rick Zamperin	Simoni Lawrence		Ticats Audio Network
Montreal	Sean Campbell	Marc-Olivier Brouillette		TSN 690 (English Radio)
Montreal	Jean St-Onge	Jean-Philippe Bolduc		98.5 FM (French Radio)
Ottawa	A.J. Jakubec	Jeff Avery		TSN 1200 (English Radio)
Ottawa	Marc Legault	Denis Piché		CKOF 104.7 FM (French Radio)
Toronto	Mike Hogan	Ben Grant		TSN 1050 (English Radio)
Toronto	Denis Casavant	Jean-Nicolas Carrière		CHOQ 105.1 FM (French Radio)

== West Division ==
Team	Play-by-play	Analyst	Sideline	Flagship Station
BC	Bob Marjanovich	Giulio Caravatta		730 CKNW (English radio)
BC	Harpreet Pandher	Taqdeer Thindal		600 CKSP Sher-E-Punjab (Punjabi radio)
Calgary	Mark Stephen	Greg Peterson	Scott Deibert, Rocco Romano, or Scott Coe	News/Talk 770
Edmonton	Morley Scott	Dave Campbell		880 CHED
Saskatchewan	Dave Thomas	Luc Mullinder		620 CKRM
Winnipeg	Derek Taylor	Doug Brown		680 CJOB

== Television ==
Play-by-play	Analyst	Sideline	Network
Rod Smith	Glen Suitor	Matthew Scianitti (Toronto and Hamilton home games; Eastern Division Playoffs/Grey Cup); Farhan Lalji (BC home games); Shantelle Chand (select West Division games); John Lu (Winnipeg home games); Claire Hanna (Ottawa home games); Jermain Franklin (Calgary home games); Tom Gazzola (Edmonton and Calgary home games)	TSN (English)
Dustin Nielson	Duane Forde	Matthew Scianitti (Toronto and Hamilton home games; Eastern Division Playoffs/Grey Cup); Farhan Lalji (BC home games); Shantelle Chand (select West Division games); John Lu (Winnipeg home games); Claire Hanna (Ottawa home games); Jermain Franklin (Calgary home games); Tom Gazzola (Edmonton and Calgary home games)	TSN (English)
Marshall Ferguson	Paul LaPolice	Matthew Scianitti (Toronto and Hamilton home games; Eastern Division Playoffs/Grey Cup); Farhan Lalji (BC home games); Shantelle Chand (select West Division games); John Lu (Winnipeg home games); Claire Hanna (Ottawa home games); Jermain Franklin (Calgary home games); Tom Gazzola (Edmonton and Calgary home games)	TSN (English)
David Arsenault	Pierre Vercheval	Didier Orméjuste	RDS (French)
