= Bryan Jones =

Bryan Jones may refer to:

- Bryan Jones (cricketer) (born 1961), English cricketer
- Bryan Jones (footballer) (born 1990), Brazilian soccer player
- Sewell Jones (Bryan Sewell Watson Jones, 1897–1981), American football coach
- Bryan D. Jones, political scientist
- Bryan Maurice Jones, American murderer
- The R.O.C. (rapper), born Bryan Jones, rapper
- SL Jones, born Bryan Jones, American rapper and songwriter
- Mr. Pookie, born Bryan Jones, rapper
- Bryan Jones, frontman of Jerry's Kids

== See also ==
- Brian Jones (disambiguation)
