= Jim Wakeman =

Jim Wakeman may refer to:

- Jim Wakeman (Canadian football), in 1973 CFL draft
- Jim Wakeman, character in The Reaping
