= Worobec =

Worobec, Worobetz, Vorobec, or Vorobets (Ukrainian: Воробець) is a Ukrainian surname meaning "sparrow". Notable people with the surname include:

- Christine Worobec (fl. 1977), professor emerita, Northern Illinois University
- Joe Worobec (born 1951), Canadian CFL player
- Myron Worobec (1944–2023), Ukrainian-American soccer player
- Stephen Worobetz (1914–2006), Canadian physician and lieutenant governor of Saskatchewan
