= San Diego serial murders =

Unsolved series of murders

Details
- Victims: 43+
- Span of crimes: 1985–1990
- Country: United States
- State: California

The San Diego serial murders were a series of murders of women that, according to the official investigation's version, occurred between 1985 and 1990 within San Diego, California, and the surrounding area. At least 28 victims were sex workers and were known to use drugs, with 4 remaining unidentified.

The murders caused public outcry that led to the local police department organizing a specialized task force that requested the public's assistance through a nationally televised broadcast. This eventually resulted in one of the most extensive and costly investigations in American history. Initially thought to be committed by a single serial killer, most of the murders are now believed to be committed by different perpetrators, including several confirmed and suspected serial killers that are unrelated to one another.

== Known victims ==
=== Modus operandi ===
The victims were primarily women aged 19 to 45 who led a marginalized lifestyle, engaged in prostitution or suffered from drug addiction. If the victim was a prostitute, they often frequented El Cajon Boulevard. It is believed that the killers often lured them into their vehicles, after which they would rape, beat and ultimately kill the victim in various ways before dumping them in various locations across San Diego County, the beach and a wooded area near Interstate 8. A number of bodies were found in trash cans located on El Cajon Boulevard or sidewalks of other streets.

=== Victims ===
Twenty two of the victims were strangled after being brutally beaten; two were shot; two were stabbed and two others were beaten to death. Five of the victims had taken a large dose of drugs prior to their death, and in at least two cases, the perpetrators put rocks and gravel in the victim's mouth. The cause of death of thirteen women could not be determined during forensic examination, as their bodies were too decomposed. The hands of ten women on the list of victims had been tied behind their backs with fragments of yellow-colored hemp rope. Most of the murders were not linked together until October 1987 - until then, they were thought to be committed by different killers.

Seven of the murdered victims were African-American; seven were Hispanic; one victim was Asian; and 28 were white. A number of them had never engaged in prostitution and were employed in a variety of jobs - for example, one was an oceanographic researcher while another was an aspiring writer.

=== Cases linked to the murders ===
Victim name	Age	Date of murder	Location of body	Case circumstances
Donna Marie Gentile	22	June 23, 1985	Mount Laguna, California	Considered the first chronological victim. Gentile settled in San Diego from Philadelphia, Pennsylvania, in the early 1980s, and between 1981 and 1982, she was convicted of four prostitution-related charges. Her body was found in a ravine off Sunrise Highway 30, but the perpetrator had not stolen anything, left no fingerprints and carefully disposed of his car's tire marks, but for some reason still cut parts of Gentile's clothes without damaging the skin. She had not been sexually assaulted.
Tara Mia Simpson	18	August 29, 1985	San Diego, California	Found murdered in an alleyway near El Cajon Boulevard, where she often prostituted herself. The perpetrator placed the victim's corpse in a dumpster before setting it on fire with a flammable substance. Although severely burned, an autopsy determined that Simpson had sustained a broken nose, a stab wound to the abdomen and signs of strangulation. She had been raped repeatedly before her death, and large doses of drugs and alcohol were found in her blood.
Patricia K. Smith	31	September 11, 1985	San Diego, California	Her nude body was found in a motel room near El Cajon Boulevard. She had been beaten and received multiple stabs to her chest and abdomen. Smith made a living as a prostitute and was arrested multiple times in the early 1980s on drug and prostitution charges.
Marsha Shirlene Funderbunk	25	September 26, 1985	Pine Valley, California	Funderbunk, a mother of two young children but was unmarried, lived in Jacumba Hot Springs, and, according to investigators, worked as a prostitute. She was found fully clothed, but her jeans had been lowered to appears as if she had been raped, with sand and dirt stuffed in her mouth.
Djuna Demetris Thomas	20	September – early October 1985	San Diego, California	Body found on a sidewalk on October 3, 1985. Little is known about this case.
Linda Joyce Nelson	27	January 4, 1986	National City, California	Body found near the I-805 exit ramp. Little is known about this case.
Linda Kay Freeby	30	January 24, 1986	San Diego, California	Body found in a parking lot. She had been stabbed in the chest and strangled to death. Freeby, from Chula Vista, had been reported missing four days prior and reportedly had no known history of prostitution.
Deborah Ann Stanford	24	February 5, 1986	San Diego, California	Her nude body was found behind a van that was parked near a paint store in North Park. Stanford had been strangled.
Trina Carpenter	22	February 11, 1986	San Diego, California	A drug addict and prostitute who spent much of her time on El Cajon Boulevard, Carpenter's killer beat, rape and strangled her before placing her body in a dumpster and setting it on fire. The location where her body was dumped was approximately one block away from where the body of another victim was found. She was initially unidentified, and was referred to as "Jane Doe 1".
Cynthia Lynn Maine	26	February 21, 1986	San Diego, California	The daughter of a former police officer, Maine became a heroin addict and prostituted herself on El Cajon Boulevard, eventually getting imprisoned for check forgery and disappearing shortly afterwards. Her car was later found abandoned in the parking lot of the "El Torito" restaurant in La Mesa. She remains missing to this day.
Michelle Riccio	19	April 24, 1986	Escondido, California	Found dead in an orange grove and initially believed to have overdosed, her cause of death was later determined to be from strangulation. Two days prior her body being found, Riccio was seen at a café with a friend who claimed that she was attempting to hitchhike back to her parents' home in San Marcos. Her father later claimed that he only learned of her fate in late 1988 after reading a newspaper article, saying that the police had never contacted him or other family members.
Joanne Sweets	34	May 9, 1986	San Diego, California	A prostitute who worked on El Cajon Boulevard, Sweets' killer beat and sodomized her to death before undressing her corpse, wrapping it up in a sheet and then placing it in two plastic trash bags which he left in a dumpster. Her body was placed just one block away from where the body of another victim, Trina Carpenter, had been found. An autopsy determined that Sweets had traces of crack cocaine and seminal fluid in her body, with the latter belonging to her killer.
Jodell Jenkins	28	June 1986	Escondido, California	A drug addict and prostitute, Jenkins was last seen staying at "The Welcome Inn", a motel in Encinitas. Her body was found in the same orange grove as Michelle Riccio. Her death was initially believed to be an overdose, but it was reclassified as a murder after her parents, friends and acquaintances claimed that she never ingested alcohol, despite the fact that alcohol was found in her system.
Carol Jane Gushrowski	N/A	late June – early July 1986	Buckman Springs, California	Her skeletal remains were found near the I-8, but remained unidentified until the early 1990s. Gushrowski, a mother of two, had a history of prostituting herself on El Cajon Boulevard, was on medication and depressed. Her husband had filed a missing persons report the day after she disappeared, but the police ignored it.
Sophia Glover	37	August 15, 1986	San Diego, California	A homeless, drug-addicted prostitute who spent her time on El Cajon Boulevard, Glover's nude body was found wrapped in a blanket in an alley in Normal Heights. She had sustained injuries to her head, neck, and chest; had been strangled; had ingested crack cocaine and been sodomized. A local resident found her clothing folded in a nearby valley after finding her body.
"Jane Doe 2"	N/A	September 1986	San Diego County, California	Skeletonized remains found in a state of severe decomposition, and remains unidentified. Little is known about this case.
Nancy Allison White	22	August 27, 1986	Carlsbad, California	Naked body found in the Batiquitos Lagoon by two boys, approximately five days after she was reported missing. Unlike other victims, White was not a drug addict or prostitute, and was living at the Marine Corps Air Station El Toro with her husband. According to her husband, Nancy was driving to their home in Santa Ana when her car broke down, after which she called him to inform what had happened. Law enforcement later located the car, containing her purse and luggagge, but White was not there.
"Jane Doe 3"	18 – 23	October 1, 1986	Pala Indian Reservation, California	Skeletonized remains of a white female were found in a section of the Pala Indian Reservation. Forensics determined that she was approximately 190 cm tall; with medium or dark brown hair; had distinctive tattoos of a swastika and butterfly on her buttocks, a rose over her right breast and a heart over her left breast. The decedent wore a brown sweater and underwear.
Theresa Marie Brewer	26	October 4, 1986	San Diego, California	A drug addict and prostitute, Brewer was found strangled near the I-8, but was left fully clothed and still had her jewelry. Her ex-husband told that they had separated after she developed her addiction, after which he returned to Missouri. He claimed that shortly before her death, Theresa had phoned him and told of her financial difficulties, her desire to improve her life and leave San Diego.
Cindy Jones	20	October 1986	San Diego, California	A prostitute who frequented the El Cajon Boulevard, her body was found on a street in San Diego. Jones had been strangled, but little else is known about the case.
Kuen Yueh Yeh Hou	20	October 1986	San Diego, California	Korean American prostitute found strangled on a sidewalk. Little is known about her case.
Melissa Gene White	22	October - December 1986	Pala Indian Reservation, California	Date of death unknown. Skeletonized remains were found in an advanced state of decomposition and an autopsy determined that she had been strangled to death. Originally from Oceanside, her remains were positively identified in January 1987.
Juliana A. Santillano	25	January 3, 1987	Coronado, California	A mother of two from Long Beach, Santillano was a drug addict who was en route to visit relatives in Baldwin Park. Her nude body was found on the Silver Strand State Beach two days later, having died from a forced heroin overdose. As she had no ties to the area, as well as showing signs of a beating and being sexually assaulted, authorities placed her on the official victim list.
Volah Jane Wright	37	March 1987	San Diego, California	A drug addict and prostitute, police were initially skeptical to include Wright as a potential victim, as the injuries on her body indicated that she had been hit by a car. Despite this, she was later officially listed.
Rose Marie Ritter	29	April 23, 1987	San Diego County, California	A prostitute who spent her time on El Cajon Boulevard and friend of Donna Gentile and Cynthia Maine, her remains were discovered by a group of migrant farm workers. During the investigation, officers located a store clerk who claimed that he had seen Ritter leave the store and enter the car of a police officer. An autopsy concluded that she had large doses of methamphetamines in her system, but Ritter's relatives and acquaintances denied that she took drugs and claimed that she had been drugged.
Rhonda Lynn Hollis	21	May 10, 1987	Bonita, California	A mother of two who prostituted herself on El Cajon Boulevard, Hollis' fully clothed body was found with six stabs wounds to the chest. She was wearing black mesh stockings, short, a T-shirt, pink nail polish, makeup and a pendant with the inscription "Foxy Lady". A belt and rope were wrapped around her arms, legs and neck.
Anna Lucilla Varela	32	mid-June 1987	San Diego, California	Body was found on June 22 by two firefighters who were jogging near an interstate highway, with signs of having been strangled. Varela had a young son, shoulder-length brown hair and a tattoo of an angel on her arm. Like many other victims, Varela made a living as a prostitute, but her mother denied it, claiming that her arrest for prostitution was erroneous and that she was simply waiting at a bus stop.
Sally Ann Moorman-Field	19	September 20, 1987	Pine Valley, California	A friend of Anna Varela, her skeletal remains were found on Sunrise Highway. She had been murdered approximately 4 to 5 weeks prior to the discovery of her body.
Sara Finland Gedalecia	36	September 25, 1987	San Diego, California	A homeless, drug-addicted prostitute, her skeletonized remains were found on the outskirts of San Diego. Law enforcement officials were unable to determine when exactly she disappeared.
Diana Gail Moffitt	24	October 9, 1987	El Cajon, California	Skeletonized remains were found during road repair work performed on Blossom Valley Road. Investigators later learned that she had a history of prostitution arrests in San Diego and Portland, Oregon.
Cheri Lee Galbreath	25	April 13, 1988	San Diego, California	She was initially unidentified until March 1990, when her fingerprints were matched to remains found in Rancho Bernardo. Investigators believe that Galbreath, a transient from Florida, had no history of arrests and the reason why her fingerprints were on file remains unknown.
Melissa Sandoval	20	May 29, 1988	Black Mountain Road, California	A prostitute who worked near El Cajon Boulevard, Sandoval was found nude and strangled to death. A friend of Jodell Jenkins, she was last seen on May 21 after getting into a white-colored car driven by a stranger.
Janet Lorene Moore	27	June 11, 1988	San Diego, California	Found stabbed to death at her apartment in downtown San Diego. Despite this, she was included in the list of victims because she was suspected of engaging in prostitution.
Sandra Cwik	43	July 1988	Buckman Springs, California	Originally from Florida, Cwik lived as a vagrant, suffered from drug addiction and engaged in prostitution. An autopsy determined that she had died from blood loss, as she had been severely beaten at about a mile from where she was found dead. According to investigators, Cwik had walked barefoot on rough roads bleeding for over a kilometer in attempt to get help.
"Jane Doe 4"	15 – 24	July 22, 1988	San Diego County, California	Skeletonized remains found in a state of severe decomposition, found with only a wedding ring and pink nail polish. Investigators believe that the bones had been at the site for two to four months, about four miles from where the remains of two other women were discovered by law enforcement officials in 1987.
Diana Ampura Luna	N/A	October 1988	San Diego, California	A Mexican American prostitute who worked on El Cajon Boulevard, Ampura was found strangled to death on a street. Little is known about this case.
Cynthia "Cindy" Lou McVey	26	November 29, 1988	Pala Indian Reservation, California	Found strangled to death at a property near the California State Route 76, with an autopsy determining that she had ingested crack cocaine shortly before death. McVey's ex-husband said that the couple lived together in Livermore, but divorced due to Cynthia's drug addiction, which eventually caused her to move to San Diego and work as a prostitute. She was last seen alive playing pool at a bar in Carlsbad. Local police claimed that she had no record of arrests for prostitution.
Linda Christine Marler	N/A	December 1988	San Diego, California	A prostitute who worked on El Cajon Boulevard and had a warrant out for theft. Marler's brother later said that he refused to file a missing persons report due to the fact that his sister had an outstanding warrant for her arrest.
Denise Marie Galloway	N/A	mid-December 1988	San Diego, California	A drug addict and prostitute, she was found strangled in an undisclosed location. Little is known about this case.
Nicolette Jean Frye	22	July 10, 1989	La Mesa, California	Found murdered in a remote desert area outside San Diego. Frye was known by local pimps and prostitutes by several aliases, including "Loretta Hart" and "Margaret Ann Haney".
Margaret Orosco Jackson	48	July 11, 1990	San Diego, California	Found strangled in a rural ranch outside San Diego. Jackson had been strangled with a rope that was found tied around her neck, and was likely killed in another location and then transported to the ranch. A mother of three, she made a living from prostitution.

=== Cases that were included, but later ruled out ===
Victim name	Age	Date of murder	Location of body	Case circumstances
Mary Ann Wells	31	September 25, 1988	San Diego, California	A prostitute who worked on El Cajon Boulevard, Wells was found shot to death in a parking lot. Was found fully clothed and had nothing stolen from her post-mortem.
Felix "Laura" Patricio Abarca	24	October 17, 1990	San Diego County, California	A transsexual prostitute who had recently undergone reassignment surgery, Abarca was found strangled on November 23, her hands having been bound with yellow-colored rope. Was the last victim included in the official list before being removed.

== Investigation ==
=== Green River Killer theory ===
Between 1985 and 1987, the murders were investigated separately, as the San Diego police and the San Diego County Sheriff's Department disagreed on whether any of the murders were connected. They were finally linked in late 1987, after the death toll reached 19 victims. Initially, a theory emerged that the killings might be the doing of the then-unidentified Green River Killer, a serial killer who was killing prostitutes in Seattle. While meetings were held between law enforcement representatives from both states, it was ultimately concluded that there was insufficient evidence for this theory to be taken seriously.

By September 1988, after the number of murdered women reached over 30, a 12-member task force was formed to investigate the murders. For the first few months, it operated largely in secret, rejecting most media requests for information, refusing to enlist the public's help in finding the killer and even refusing to disclose where the force's headquarters was located, with spokespersons claiming that it could attract the killer's attention. This move was criticized by Ron Sims, an official from Seattle who funded the task force that hunted down the Green River Killer, claiming that this decision cost them the chance of catching the killer years earlier. In December 1988, the FBI took over the investigation, but was criticized by members of the task force for refusing to share progress on the murders and allegedly impeding the investigation.

Criminal profilers attempting to create a psychological profile of the supposed serial killer suggested that the reasons could be misogyny; being robbed by prostitutes or pimps; contracting venereal diseases like HIV; having low self esteem or being unsuccessful with women. During the course of the investigation, thousands of men from San Diego County were tested for potential involvement on the basis that they had criminal records for violent offenses against women, were mentally ill or HIV-positive. In the first six months of its existence, the group spent about $88,200, not including money spent on staff salaries.

=== Criticism ===
Almost immediately, there were skeptics who criticized the idea that the Seattle murders were linked to those in San Diego, as studies at the time suggested that at least 50 active serial killers worked across the United States alone. Robert Keppel, a major investigator for the Washington State Attorney General's Office at the time, said that over the years he had received numerous inquiries from departments around the country that claimed the Green River Killer had killed in their areas, but only those in San Diego were close enough for consideration.

Keppel told during media interviews that one of the major issues was communication between the various police departments being lacklustre. Having been involved in the investigation of Ted Bundy, he suggested that if there was one single killer, he likely had moved out of state, was arrested for another crime or was already deceased. Because of this, he suggested that police should focus to examine data on the number of victims, focus on recently arrested perpetrators and investigate those who suddenly left San Diego under suspicious circumstances.

== Suspects ==
=== Convicted ===
==== Terry Millaud ====
In 1985, 27-year-old Terry Wynn Millaud was named as a suspect in two stabbing murders: the August 19th murder of 52-year-old Charles L. Irwin, who was stabbed to death at a store in San Ysidro, and the murder of Patricia Smith, one of the victims put on the list. He was convicted of both killings and sent to prison, but was never linked to any of the other victims.

==== Donald Couch ====
In February 1986, the 28-year-old Donald Eugene Couch was identified as the prime suspect in the murder of Linda Freeby, committed while he was out on parole for another crime. While he was ruled out as a suspect in the other murders, he was convicted of this crime and sent to prison.

==== Ronald Porter ====
In early 1988, one of the prime suspects was 40-year-old Ronald Elliot Porter, an auto mechanic and former Marine who lived and worked in Escondido. He had been arrested in October 1987 for assaulting Annette Russell, a prostitute who worked on El Cajon Boulevard, where most of the victims had gone missing. After luring the girl into his car, Porter drove her to the outskirts of San Diego, where he beat and stabbed her twice, but was caught in the act by police officers patrolling the area. He was immediately labeled the prime suspect after the body of "Jane Doe 4" was found not far from where he had stopped his car and attempted to kill Russell.

Porter would later be convicted of felonious assault and sentenced to 4 years imprisonment. He was paroled in December 1990, but was returned to prison not long after on a parole violation. In September 1991, he was charged with the murders of Gushrowski and Cwik, as well as the attempted murders of five women committed between 1986 and 1988. Porter would ultimately be convicted solely of the Cwik murder and sentenced to life imprisonment, but was proposed as a suspect in 13 others, including those of Gentile and Maine. The San Diego County District Attorney's Office stated that four lint fibers recovered from Gentile's clothing matched in texture and color to fibers from Porter's car seat upholstery, but he was never charged with her murder.

==== Alan Stevens ====
In December 1988, 46-year-old Alan Michael "Buzzard" Stevens, a former biker with convictions for assaults against women and weapons violations, was arrested in San Marcos while sleeping inside his van. He was charged with the murder of Cynthia McVey, and was additionally proposed as a suspect in the kidnapping of 4-year-old Laura Bradbury, who had been abducted from the Joshua Tree National Park in October 1984.

The investigators determined that Stevens frequented the same bar as the one McVey was last seen in, but none of the employees or patrons could recall any instance of them interacting. Nevertheless, physical evidence and fingerprints linked him to the murder, as the latter were found on the duct tape used to bound McVey's legs. Stevens was found guilty of her murder and sentenced to life imprisonment with a chance of parole after serving 25 years on January 15, 1991. He was suspected in the murders of at least four other women, but was never charged in these crimes.

==== Elmer Nance ====
On September 27, 1991, 63-year-old Elmer Lee Nance was arrested in Barstow for murdering 22-year-old Nancy White. A vagrant, he had been convicted of child molestation in 1974 and lived on the streets of San Diego in 1987. His attorneys argued that while he technically admitted responsibility, he was coerced by the interrogators due to his fragile mental state. In 1992, he was convicted of White's murder and sentenced to life imprisonment. For a time after his conviction, he was considered a main suspect in several other murders, but was later ruled out.

==== Bryan Jones ====
In June 1992, 30-year-old Bryan Maurice Jones, an inmate serving a 22-year sentence for raping a young woman near El Cajon Boulevard, was charged with four murders that occurred in the area. Forensics determined that his fingerprints were found on the bodies of Tara Simpson, Trina Carpenter, Joanne Sweets and Sophia Glover, all of which were found in dumpsters near Jones' apartment. In addition to this, he was charged with the sexual assault and attempted murder of two other women that occurred in San Diego on August 15, 1985, and October 20, 1986, who identified him as their rapist. Jones pleaded not guilty to all charges, while prosecutors sought a death sentence against him. In 1994, Jones was convicted of murdering Sweets and Glover, after which he was sentenced to death - the charges in the Simpson and Carpenter were dropped due to a lack of evidence. Jones was tested for involvement in other murders, but was never charged.

==== Wayne Amundson ====
In the summer of 1992, 32-year-old Wayne Robert Amundson was named as a suspect in the murder of 22-year-old Melissa Gene White, after he had already been arrested in Wisconsin for the attempted murder of 30-year-old Deloris Fernandez. He pleaded not guilty, but was proven to be the killer after his DNA was found on the crime scene. Between 1981 and 1988, he lived on the Pala Indian Reservation, where the bodies of at least 5 victims were found, including that of White. Shortly after the establishment of the task force, he abruptly left the state and moved to Wisconsin. He would later be convicted of second-degree murder and sentenced to 16 years imprisonment.

==== Andrew Urdiales ====
In April 1997, Andrew Urdiales was considered a possible suspect after it was proven that he had killed Mary Ann Wells, who had previously been listed as an official victim. While there were no links between him and the other murders, he was convicted of Wells' murder as well as that of seven other women, for which he was sentenced to death.

==== Mark Elder ====
On August 5, 2005, 47-year-old Mark Francis Elder was arrested in Orange City, Florida, for the murder of Janet Moore after DNA linked him to the crime scene. He was investigated for the other murders, but eventually ruled out. He would be convicted of her murder and remains in prison to this day.

=== Accused ===
==== Blake Taylor ====
In June 1988, 25-year-old Blake Raymond Taylor was arrested for assaulting 42-year-old Irene Quinland. The woman told police that she made her living as a prostitute on El Cajon Boulevard and that after picking her up, Taylor drove her to an isolated overpass near the San Diego River where Taylor, armed with a shotgun, forced her to lie down on the car's floor and cover herself with a blanket whilst threatening to shoot her if she went to the police.

Taylor later admitted that he did indeed threaten the woman, but insisted that he had done so to get his $40 and because he had changed his mind about having sex with her. Quinland claimed that her assailant had mentioned killing a Mexican girl, and after comparing the various victims, investigators came to believe that he meant Melissa Sandoval, who was found dead less than two weeks before Quinland was attacked. Taylor owned a white Ford Bronco, the same type and color of car driven by the man last seen with Sandoval.

Taylor was later convicted of kidnapping and assaulting Irene Quinland, for which he was sentenced to life imprisonment. Investigators were unable to prove that he killed Sandoval, and he has never been charged with any of the other murders.

==== Thomas Eastgate ====
Arrested in early 1989 for assaulting a prostitute in San Diego, he was named as a suspect in several rapes and some of the murders. However, no charges were filed against him in relation to any of the official victims.

==== Glesty Waters ====
On January 25, 1989, 35-year-old Glesty Donald Waters, a resident of Coos Bay, Oregon, was arrested for the assault of 33-year-old Helen Ruth Toy, who was strangled into unconsciousness in a rural area near Chula Vista on January 6. Due to the similarities with the murders, Waters was initially considered a main suspect, but was later ruled out due to lack of evidence. He later served ten months in prison for his assault on Toy.

==== Daniel Stafford ====
In March 1989, Daniel Thomas Stafford was arrested for the assault of a juvenile prostitute in October 1987. The victim alleged that Stafford drove her to the I-8 highway and then to Pine Valley, where he threatened her with a knife and attempted to strangle her. However, she resisted violently and managed to escape his vehicle before being rescued by a passing truck driver. After his arrest, Stafford pleaded guilty and was placed on probation, but was subsequently ruled out as a suspect.

==== Richard Sanders ====
On March 10, 1989, 45-year-old Richard Allen Sanders, a former police officer based in Vancouver, Washington, was shot and killed in Yacolt by two men, Joel Hansen and Clifford Brethour. From 1965 until the early 1970s, Sanders worked for the police departments in Vancouver and Salem, Oregon, before moving to National City, where he ran a bar from 1976 to 1984. On February 9, 1989, Sanders was arrested for impersonating a police officer and threatening prostitutes to get into his car. After his arraignment, his bail was set on $14,000, and after it was paid, he was released until the next court hearing. Following his death, police searched Sanders' apartment and a rented garage in San Diego, where they found nude photographs of girls and women, as well as videotapes, one of which featured Melissa Sandoval.

In addition, two boxes were found containing his personal index cards labeled the "Seattle Files" and the "San Diego Files", with entries about the identities of prostitutes in Seattle and San Diego, including photographs. A number of Sanders' friends and acquaintances described him as a misogynist, due to the fact a girl he had dated later turned out to be a prostitute. In mid-1989, an informant told police that in January 1988, Sanders showed him two snuff films he had made himself, in which he played a serial killer who killed prostitutes. According to the informant, Sandoval played a lead role in one of them. Suspicion against him heightened after his close friends revealed that he made a living by selling and distributing methamphetamine to pimps and prostitutes across San Diego, which allowed him to spend a lot of time in their company. However, no conclusive evidence was found, and he was ruled out in both the San Diego and Seattle murders.

==== James Jackson ====
In March 1990, 25-year-old James Morris Jackson was arrested for assaulting a prostitute on El Cajon Boulevard. He was later charged with attempted murder after it emerged that he had attempted to strangle her after having sex. The victim told police that Jackson only paid her $4 for her services, and that he attacked her after she demanded more money. Jackson was interrogated about the other murders, but was able to provide an alibi and was ruled out.

==== SDPD Officers ====
In 1990, various community organizations and political activists demanded that the City of San Diego investigate and discipline a number of police officers after a number of friends and relatives of the first victim, Donna Gentile, told various media outlets that the murders were supposedly committed by a group of police officers who had forced them to become street informants and sexually harassed them. Under public pressure, the San Diego County District Attorney was forced to order an internal investigation under federal supervision. Gentile had been murdered five weeks after she implicated two local police officers in a high-profile prostitution and blackmail case that resulted in the demotion of one officer and the dismissal of the other. The internal investigation revealed that some colleagues suspected the two men of killing Gentile as early as 1985. However, forensic and autopsy reports were classified and never released to the public.

The two officers were Larry Avrech and Lt. Carl Black, with additional accusations being placed against Sgt. Michael Blakely, Curtis Meyer, Richard Draper, Robert Candland, Det. Frank Christensen, James Brook and Jeffrey Dean. All of them were disciplined by a disciplinary board for inappropriate behavior towards prostitutes working on the El Cajon Boulevard between May 1984 and January 1985. Gentile alleged that she started working as an informant under Avrech in February 1981, but he then threatened to arrest her unless she provided him with sexual services. From 1982 to January 1984, Gentile was never arrested, but after she attempted to stop cooperating, she was arrested on various charges between February and March 1984. At the discipline hearings, Gentile testified against Avrech, but not Black, as her friendship with him was supposedly the reason why Avrech started harassing her in the first place. In 1990, Avrech admitted that he had been intimate with Gentile, but claimed that the acts were voluntary.

Avrech added that multiple people may have been involved in the girl's murder because she was cooperating with a number of other San Diego Police Department officers who paid her money to help them in at least one case against a major pimp, which was never publicized out of fear that the media would reveal Gentile and the officers' names. Avrech criticized the idea of the internal investigation and thought that it should have been entrusted to a more neutral body such as the District Attorney's Office. Four months before her death, while in county jail on prostitution charges, Gentile, with the help of acquaintances, recorded a videotape of her suspicions about the officers, then gave the videotape to her attorney Doug Holbrook, who in turn showed the contents of the videotape to the media and the public.

In November 1991, the investigation was completed, resulting in Sgt. Alfonso “Sal” Salvatierra and Officer John Fung being suspended for 20 days without pay, while Officer Chuck Arnold was suspended for 10 days without pay. Assistant San Diego Police Chief Dave Worden declined to say how many officers had been disciplined, citing confidentiality laws that prohibited the Police Department from discussing personnel matters. One high-ranking police officer, who wished to remain anonymous, told the media that the suspensions were not the most serious punishment given the seriousness of the evidence. All three officers, in addition to being connected to Gentile, were also connected to Cynthia Maine, whose phone number was written on a scrap of paper found in Gentile's personal effects after her death.

On July 2, 1984, Maine was arrested by Fung on suspicion of being drunk. Shortly afterwards, she agreed to become a police informant and began informing Fung of all drug dealers she knew in San Diego and wearing recording equipment to listen in on conversations. In the summer of 1985, after Gentile had been murdered, a romantic relationship developed between Fung and Maine. According to her mother, Maine was in love with Fung, had a certain respect for law enforcement as her father was one; introduced him to her sister; and even brought him to her home several times, where he met Cynthia's mother.

In September 1985, Maine was arrested, convicted of check fraud and sentenced to four months imprisonment at the Las Colinas County Jail. While in jail, she testified about the misconduct of certain police officers who, in the Gentile case, forced them to provide sexual services and extorted them. Maine named all the names she knew and agreed to testify at civil hearings if needed. After this, she was paroled and returned to San Diego. Police captain Mike E. Tyler, who interviewed Maine and acted as her parole officer, feared that Maine's testimony would result in retaliation from the corrupt police officers. On February 21, 1985, she was reported missing.

Her disappearance was reported to the police five days later, but according to relatives, the police showed no interest. During the investigation, Fung admitted that he knew Maine, but claimed that he had no special affection towards her. After her car was found, Maine's mother, Linda Coleman, claimed police refused to check the interior for fingerprints or blood and constantly lost evidence related to the case. A former police officer named Dennis Sesma, who retired in 1989, said that he also cooperated with Maine and authorized the use of his name so she could avoid trouble, but claimed that neither he nor Fung were in an intimate relationship with her. At one point, police also suspected Maine's ex-husband and pimp Steve Smith, but were unable to prove it, as by 1991 he had serious health and memory problems and was living in a drug treatment facility.

In 1991, Det. Thomas Steed, who investigated Gentile's murder in 1985, testified at the disciplinary hearings against Fung, Arnold and Salvatierra. In them, he claimed that the investigation was obstructed in every way possible by Sgt. Harold Goudarzi, who was Avrech's immediate superior and was the one whom Gentile approached for the former's harassment. Steed continued to investigate the alleged misconduct and the connection to Gentile, which supposedly prompted Goudarzi to dismiss him.

Steed then identified Gentile's killers as Carl Black and Robert Hannibal, a police officer who had been fired in 1983 for sexually harassing and beating prostitutes. Despite claims from a number of acquaintances and prostitutes that the pair had approached multiple people to devise a plan to kill Gentile, no concrete evidence was uncovered to confirm this. Black was also offered to undergo a polygraph test, but he denied. Steed also claimed that then-Chief Medical Examiner David Stark, because of his close cooperation with the San Diego District Attorney's Office and the police, withheld the autopsy reports on Gentile's body from the public. According to people who believe in the SPDP theory, Stark intentionally classified the reports in an attempt to conceal evidence and clues implicating the officers. Shortly before the creation of the task force, Stark was fired from his position for destroying critical evidence in the form of cremating the remains of four victims without proper authorization.

Citing evidence of widespread misconduct and unprofessional activity on part of the narcotics unit, including allegations that members of the unit used prostitute informants who were then sexually harassed, the San Diego Police Department Management concluded in late 1991 that misconduct in regard to prostitutes was widespread in the mid-1980s. Kathy Hardy, who worked as a prostitute from 1988 to 1991, testified that the practice of having sex with prostitutes and then arresting them was a common practice among many on the police force. Police Chief Bob Bergrin, under public pressure, stated that he and the department were embarrassed by the outcome of the internal investigation and about five police officers would be held accountable for their actions.

Chuck Arnold came under intense scrutiny after his name was discovered in the address book of a female pimp named Karen Wilkening. In 1981, Wilkening, a former real estate agent from New York City, organized an escort service stationed in San Diego, and after a raid, police seized a list containing the names of more than 500 clients. Among the clients were major criminals, businessmen, police and government officials. In the mid-1980s, according to entries in her diary, Arnold collaborated with Wilkening and hired girls to dance at the bachelor party of fellow officer John Lusardi. One of Wilkening's clients was Alfonso Salvatierra, who was found in possession of nude photographs of Gentile and Maine, along with Harold Goudarzi, who was suspended after a disciplinary board found him liable for having a sexual relationship with Denise Loesch, a prostitute and friend of Gentile. Wilkening was arrested on charges of prostituting, but after a preliminary court hearing, she escaped to the Philippines in September 1987.

In May 1989, she was located, arrested and extradited back to the United States, as officials believed that she had knowledge of the murders. While she admitted that several of her clients were high-profile, but claimed that the girls were employed on a voluntary basis and that Gentile was never employed by her. She was later sentenced to 3 years imprisonment for operating a prostitution ring. In the end, no criminal charges were ever filed against any of the individuals named in the hearings, despite the acknowledgement of widespread corruption.

The reputation of San Diego's police force was further damaged in February 1991, after an art exhibit depicting the 45 victims as a form of tribute was heavily criticized by the public and family members of the victims. The mothers of Michelle Riccio and Jodell Jenkins told the media that law enforcement never contacted them about their daughters' murders. Parents of other victims shared similar claims of officers refusing to file police reports because the victims were drug addicts and vagrants.

== Status ==
On July 1, 1992, the investigation was officially concluded, and the task force was disbanded. This move was criticized by other law enforcement agencies, mostly due to the fact that the known suspects were rarely charged with murder and instead with other, less serious crimes. This was supported by the victims' family members, who accused the police department of being sloppy and requesting another investigation.

As of 2026, the remaining murders remain unsolved and are considered cold cases.

== See also ==
- List of serial killers in the United States
- List of solved missing person cases: 1950–1999
- List of unsolved murders (1980–1999)

== Bibliography ==
- Anita DeFrancesco (November 27, 2018). The Donna Gentile Story: The Life and Murder of an Innocent Runaway. Rosey. ISBN 978-0982261613.
