= CISF-FM =

Community radio station in Surrey, British Columbia

Coordinates: 49.1047°N 122.7966°W

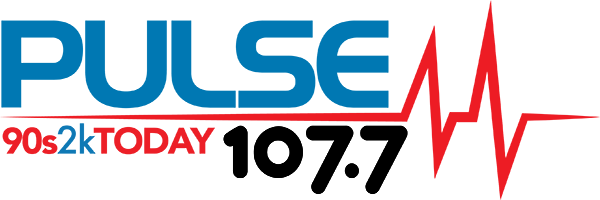
- Surrey, British Columbia; Canada
- Broadcast area: Greater Vancouver
- Frequency: 107.7 MHz (HD Radio)
- Branding: Pulse FM 107.7

Programming
- Format: Adult contemporary/Community radio
- Subchannels: HD2: CKSP simulcast HD3: South Asian "Sher-E-Punjab Music Channel"

Ownership
- Owner: South Fraser Broadcasting Inc.

History
- First air date: December 18, 2015
- Call sign meaning: Owner South Fraser Broadcasting

Technical information
- Class: A
- ERP: 2.5 kW
- HAAT: 132.4 metres

Links
- Webcast: Listen Live
- Website: pulsefm.ca

CISF-FM (107.7 MHz) is an English-language radio station which broadcasts a combined adult contemporary/community radio format in Surrey, British Columbia, Canada.

The new station is based in the Surrey town centre of Cloverdale and is owned by South Fraser Broadcasting Inc. (a different company from the similarly named South Fraser Broadcasting which once owned CISL and CKZZ-FM).

Approval from the CRTC was made on August 6, 2014. The station is licensed to broadcast with an effective radiated power of 2500 watts (with an effective height of antenna above average terrain of 132.4 metres). The station began testing on December 18, 2015.

In addition to music, the station broadcasts local news and other spoken word content targeted at Surrey's diverse population.

== Current lineup ==
- Rudy Parachoniak (2020–present)
- Tara Lopez (2016–present)
- Neil Morrison (2016–present)
- Leslie and Hollywood Harv (Leslie Stein and Harv Puni) (March 2022 – present)

== Paid Programming ==
CISF offers locally produced paid programming.

- 'Radio Real Estate' with Tom Lucas (2017–Present)
