= Rudy Florio =

Canadian gridiron football player (born 1950)

No. 15, 57, 12
- Positions: Running back, Tight end

Personal information
- Born: March 26, 1950 (age 76)
- Listed height: 5 ft 10 in (1.78 m)
- Listed weight: 195 lb (88 kg)

Career information
- High school: Glendale (Hamilton, Ontario)
- College: Youngstown State
- CFL draft: 1973: 5th round, 37th overall pick

Career history
- 1973–1976: Montreal Alouettes
- 1977–1978: BC Lions

Awards and highlights
- Grey Cup champion (1974); Vanier Cup champion (1984)

Rudy Florio (born March 26, 1950) is a Canadian former professional football running back who played six seasons in the Canadian Football League (CFL) with the Montreal Alouettes and BC Lions. He was selected by the Lions in the fifth round of the 1973 CFL draft after playing college football at Youngstown State University.

== Early life and college ==
Rudy Florio was born on March 26, 1950. He played high school football at Glendale Secondary School in Hamilton, Ontario. He scored 12 touchdowns his senior year.

Florio played college football for the Youngstown State Penguins of Youngstown State University. He rushed 93 times for 401 yards and two touchdowns his senior year in 1972 while also catching 18 passes for 194 yards and one touchdown. He graduated from Youngstown State in 1973 with a bachelor's in business administration.

== Professional career ==
Florio was selected by the BC Lions in the fifth round, with the 37th overall pick, of the 1973 CFL draft. Despite this, he ended up playing for the Montreal Alouettes during the 1973 season. He dressed in all 14 games for the Alouettes in 1973, totaling six carries for 36 yards, two catches for negative three yards, and three kickoff returns for 62 yards. Florio dressed in 16 games during the 1974 season, recording 12 rushing attempts for 51 yards, five receptions for 58 yards, three kickoff returns for 66 yards, and nine punt returns for 45 yards. The Alouettes finished the year with a 9–5–2 record, and won the 62nd Grey Cup against the Edmonton Eskimos by a score of 20–7. In 1975, Florio became the Alouettes first-ever special teams captain. He dressed in all 16 games during the 1975 season and returned one kickoff for 15 yards. The Alouettes went 9–7 and lost in the 63rd Grey Cup by a score of 9–8. While with the Alouettes, he wore two different jersey numbers during the same games. As a backfield substitute, he had to wear number 15 and as a left guard on the punt unit, he had to wear number 57. Florio dressed in 15 games in 1976, recording 17 rushes for 60 yards, four receptions for 18 yards, and one kickoff return for four yards.

On June 14, 1977, Florio was traded to the BC Lions for future considerations. He dressed in all 16 games for the Lions in 1977, totaling four carries for 14 yards, one catch for 11 yards, and four kickoff returns for 54 yards. He dressed in nine games during the 1978 season, rushing five times for 23 yards while also returning three kickoffs for 49 yards. In September 1978, Florio broke a bone in his right hand and missed the rest of the season. He was special teams captain both years he was with the Lions.

== Personal life ==
While still in the CFL, Florio founded a sports wear company called RWF Marketing. He was also later a founder of Liaison College, a culinary arts academy.

Florio won the 20th Vanier Cup as an assistant coach with the Guelph Gryphons in 1984.
