= CKSP =

- Vancouver, British Columbia; Canada
- Broadcast area: Greater Vancouver
- Frequency: 600 kHz
- Branding: Sher-E-Punjab Radio

Programming
- Languages: Punjabi and Hindi (67%)
- Format: Multicultural

Ownership
- Owner: Sher-e-Punjab Radio Broadcasting Inc.

History
- First air date: September 28, 2020
- Call sign meaning: SP for Sher-e-Punjab

Technical information
- Class: B
- Power: 50,000 watts day; 20,000 watts night
- Transmitter coordinates: 49°9′38.88″N 122°43′55.2″W
- Repeater: 107.7 CISF-HD2 (Surrey)

Links
- Website: www.sherepunjabradio.ca

CKSP (600 AM) is an ethnic radio station licensed to serve Vancouver, British Columbia, Canada. It is owned by Sher-E-Punjab Radio Broadcasting Inc. and broadcasts primarily in Punjabi and Hindi to the Lower Mainland from a site east of Surrey. The company's studios are in Richmond.

CKSP began broadcasting on September 28, 2020. Its owner had previously produced programming in Canada to be broadcast on stations across the US border in Washington state but won a Canadian radio station licence in 2016.

== History ==
Beginning in 2002, Sher-e-Punjab produced programming in Canada for air on KRPI (1550 AM) in Ferndale, Washington, United States. In 2014, the CRTC issued a mandatory order preventing Sher-e-Punjab from producing radio programs in Canada for broadcast on US stations to Canadian audiences.

In 2016, the CRTC considered seven applicants for new ethnic commercial radio stations on the Lower Mainland, first among them in filing order one from Sher-e-Punjab. The commission approved two of the seven new stations, one from Sher-e-Punjab and one from Akash Broadcasting (CJCN-FM), for licences to expire in 2023. The Sher-e-Punjab station proposed a news/talk format aimed at listeners aged 40 to 65, and the CRTC required it to provide programming to 19 or more ethnic groups in 17 different languages with 67 per cent of the programming to be in Punjabi or Hindi. The station remained unbuilt when in 2018 the CRTC approved technical changes stemming from a sale of the initially proposed transmitter site. At the new site, it was approved to broadcast with 50 kW day and 20 kW night.

CKSP began broadcasting on September 28, 2020, with many of the same on-air personalities heard on KRPI when Sher-e-Punjab providing programming. In 2022, CKSP host Paul Brar, was temporarily suspended for remarks that were seen as victim-blaming toward a woman who died of suicide in New York.

== Programming ==
CKSP airs news and talk as well as Sikh religious programs during the day. On weeknights, it airs Late Nights with Aaisha Khan, which features content in Urdu. Programming in languages other than Hindi, Punjabi, English, and Urdu is confined to Saturday and Sunday evenings.

The station airs occasional sports broadcasts in Punjabi. In 2023, CKSP and CHAH in Edmonton aired the first Punjabi-language broadcast of a Canadian Football League game between the BC Lions and Edmonton Elks. In 2024, the station aired a full slate of Punjabi-language Lions games and the first Grey Cup broadcast in the language.
