= Bryan Maurice Jones =

American murderer and suspected serial killer

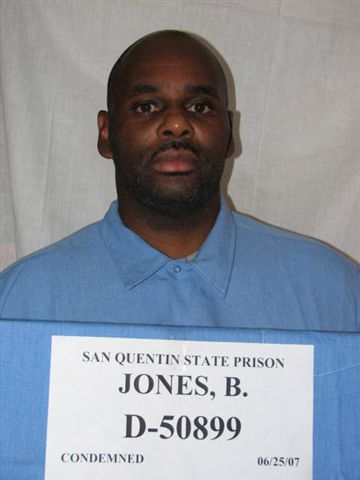
- Born: March 14, 1962 (age 64); San Diego County, California, U.S.
- Other name: "The Dumpster Killer"
- Convictions: First degree murder with special circumstances x2; Rape x2; Attempted murder
- Penalty: Death

Details
- Victims: 2–4
- Span of crimes: 1985–1986
- Country: United States
- State: California
- Date apprehended: October 1986

Bryan Maurice Jones (born March 14, 1962), known as The Dumpster Killer, is an American murderer, rapist and suspected serial killer who murdered between two and four women in San Diego, California, from 1985 to 1986. After killing them, he would discard their bodies in dumpsters.

He was linked to the four killings after being imprisoned for rape, and was later put on trial. Convicted of two of the murders, he was sentenced to death and remains on California's death row.

== Early life ==
Bryan Maurice Jones was born on May 14, 1962, in San Diego County, California, the older of two children of a Marine. Jones grew up in a poor neighborhood in Barstow, while his father spent most of the 1960s stationed around various military bases in Okinawa, Japan. In the early 1970s, his father resigned from the Marine Corps and became addicted to alcohol and gambling, as a result of which he lost the family's life savings. This led Jones' father to be physically abusive towards his family when drunk, reportedly breaking Bryan's arm on at least one occasion.

At around this time, Jones lost interest in learning and began to spend most of his time on the streets. His sister would later claim that she had been sexually abused by him between 1973 and 1974, but this was never confirmed. In the mid-1970s, Jones' parents divorced and his mother moved the children to San Diego, where they lived in a housing estate on 51st Street, near the El Cajon Boulevard, an infamous red-light district at the time.

Under the influence of peers, Jones committed a theft in 1975, after which he was arrested and incarcerated at a juvenile detention facility. Once in San Diego, Jones began attending a local school, but was soon forced to drop out due to academic failures and truancy. In 1979, encouraged by his mother, he enrolled at the San Diego Job Corps programme. Later that year, the 17-year-old Jones met 15-year-old Tracy Davison, with whom he began an intimate relationship that resulted in him impregnating Davison. She gave birth to their son the following year and moved in to the Joneses' apartment, but never married Bryan.

In the early 1980s, Jones graduated from the Job Corps as a welder and worked for various local businesses, where he was well regarded by superiors and characterized positively by friends and acquaintances. In 1983, Jones and Davison separated, with the latter marrying a man named David Entzminger. Davison later claimed that her reason for leaving him was that in the early 1980s, Jones got addicted to watching and collecting pornographic videotapes and reportedly attacked her, including an instance where he attempted to strangle her. After Davison left him, Jones began spending all his free time on El Cajon Boulevard with prostitutes and pimps.

=== Charges ===
Davison alleged that, shortly before his arrest, Jones started being aggressive against her and her husband, resulting in at least two fights in the fall of 1985, during which Davison lost a tooth. After the incident, the couple sued Jones, who was ordered to not approach them due to a restraining order.

On August 16, 1985, Jones was arrested for assaulting and raping a prostitute named Maria R. The woman claimed that she was a homeless heroin addict and that on the previous day, Jones had offered to have sex with her for $20. They then boarded a bus and went to his apartment, where he sexually assaulted and strangled her with a rope until she lost consciousness. When she came back to her senses, Jones raped her again, took back his $20 and released her, threatening to kill her if she told the police. Despite this, Maria R. did go to the police - however, Jones was released only a few days later and all charges against him were dropped, as Maria R. unexpectedly failed to show up for subsequent meetings with investigators and stopped cooperating altogether.

== Arrest ==
In late October 1986, Jones was arrested for kidnapping and raping a female cook named Bertha R. On October 16, she was in a phone booth on El Cajon Boulevard looking for the address of a check-cashing office when Jones drove up to her in his Datsun 280Z and offered to help out. He drove her to the office, but the computers were malfunctioning, at which point he suggested to Bertha that they go to his house on Mississippi Street until they fix the problem. Bertha accepted, and once inside, the pair smoked marijuana before Jones asked if he could kiss her.

She refused, which caused an angered Jones to threaten her with a knife and then rape her. After stealing $65 from her, Jones put Bertha in his car and drove her to the outskirts of San Diego, where he forced her to perform oral sex on him before releasing her. After Jones' arrest, she positively identified him and his car, which actually belonged to Jones' sister. His blood type matched that of the seminal fluid found on the victim's body, and she later confirmed that the house he lived in was the house where she had been raped. The house itself belonged to a Mrs. Tillie Wilsie, to whom Jones' mother worked as a caregiver. Wilsie allowed the Joneses to live there, and as Bryan also helped in taking care of the elderly woman, he had a key to the residence. In January 1987, he was convicted of rape and false imprisonment, for which he was sentenced to 22 years imprisonment.

== Exposure ==
After his conviction, Jones was transferred to the Corcoran State Prison to serve out his sentence. On June 24, 1992, he was visited by representatives of the San Diego County District Attorney's Office, who said that they intended to charge him with four murders. They were the following:

- On August 29, 1985, the burned body of 19-year-old Tara Mia Simpson was found inside a dumpster on 5100 block near El Cajon Boulevard. Although the severity of the burns made forensic examination difficult, an autopsy revealed that the victim had a nasal injury not caused by the fire, a stab wound to her abdomen and signs of asphyxiation, but no throat or respiratory trauma. Swabs revealed the presence of seminal fluid in her mouth, vagina and rectum, leading police to believe that she had been raped and sodomized before her death.
- On February 11, 1986, the body of 23-year-old Trina Carpenter was found stuffed inside a duffel bag in a dumpster in an alley on 4500 block near 51st Street. Like Simpson, she was a prostitute who frequented El Cajon Boulevard and had been set on fire post-mortem. An autopsy concluded that she had ingested crack cocaine, was beaten and eventually strangled. Her body was found less than a block away from Simpson's.
- On May 9, the body of 34-year-old JoAnn Sweets was found in a dumpster on 4400 block on 51st Street. She had no clothing on, other than a bra and a blouse. Sweets was strangled and evidently battered prior to being killed, as bruises were found on her face and neck. In addition, she had fractures to her cervical vertebrae, ribs and collarbone, and was found to have ingested crack cocaine. Her body was found wrapped in a sheet and mattress cover, and then placed in two oversized plastic garbage bags sealed with duct tape, which had been covered with a blanket. While investigating the crime scene, investigators learned that the blanket that covered the victim's corpse belonged to Jones and was crocheted by his mother. Pile particles found on Sweets' blouse, mattress pad and on the blanket were consistent in texture and color with ones found in Jones' apartment, and his fingerprints were found on the garbage bags and the dumpster. DNA later confirmed that the semen found on her body matched Jones' profile.
- On August 15, the body of 37-year-old Sophia Glover was found inside a dumpster on 2200 block of Madison Avenue in Normal Heights, only a block away from Mrs. Wilsie's home. Glover, a transient from Florida and known prostitute, was strangled and had been mistreated similarly to the previous victims. An autopsy confirmed that she had ingested large amounts of crack cocaine and had suffered severe blunt force trauma to her head, neck and chest. Her clothes were found in a nearby alley, and DNA testing on the semen was later matched to Jones.

In addition to the murders, Jones was charged with the sexual assault and attempted murder of two other women: Maria R. and Karen M. According to the latter victim, a self-admitted prostitute and drug addict, he approached her at the intersection of 29th Street and Imperial Avenue while he was driving his blue Datsun 280Z. Jones offered her money in exchange for her services, to which she agreed. He drove her to Mrs. Wilsie's house on Mississippi Street, where they drank Jack Daniel's. He then told her to perform oral sex on him before placing her in a chokehold and made several unsuccessful attempts to rape her. The victim said her forced her to drink a large amount of whiskey until she passed out; she was discovered by Wilsie's daughter, Marjorie, who called the police. Law enforcement did not believe her account of what had happened, and she was charged with breaking and entering and attempted larceny. A criminal case against Jones was not filed until early 1993, after the victim identified him as her rapist from a series of photographs.

Deputy District Attorney Jeff Dusek said the work to expose Jones was part of a task force that aimed to solve the murders of at least 43 women killed in San Diego County from 1985 to 1990, most of whom frequented El Cajon Boulevard. After his indictment, Jones was transferred to the San Diego County Jail to face charges for the murders, to which he pleaded innocence.

== Trial, sentence and imprisonment ==
In March 1994, Jones was found guilty of murdering Sweets and Glover, as well as the sexual assaults of the two other victims. His attorneys argued that the women's testimonies were questionable due to the fact that they were drug addicts and prostitutes, and that one of them suffered from anterograde amnesia. Jones and his mother claimed that in August 1985, after his initial rape charges were dropped, Maria appeared with two others to apologize for falsely accusing him, but the two other women were never identified. As for the murders of Carpenter and Simpson, the jury were deadlocked on these counts, which forced Justice Laura Hammes to declare that Jones would need to be retried in these murders.

On September 19, 1994, Jones was officially sentenced to death. After the announcement of the verdict, Dusek said that he would not have Jones tried on the remaining charges due to the fact that he was already on death row.

Since his conviction for the murders, Jones has remained on California's death row and awaits execution.

== See also ==
- San Diego serial murders
- Capital punishment in California
- List of death row inmates in the United States § California
