= Brian Jones (sailor) =

New Zealand sailor

Personal information
- Nationality: New Zealand
- Born: 17 March 1959 (age 67) Lower Hutt, New Zealand

Sport
- Sport: Sailing

Brian Jones (born 17 March 1959) is a New Zealand sailor. He competed at the 1992 Summer Olympics and the 1996 Summer Olympics.
