= Dave Campbell (Canadian football) =

Canadian football player

Profile
- Position: Defensive back

Personal information
- Born: 1951 (age 74–75)
- Listed height: 6 ft 0 in (1.83 m)
- Listed weight: 190 lb (86 kg)

Career information
- University: Queen's
- CFL draft: 1973: 9th round, 71st overall pick

Career history
- 1974–1975: Edmonton Eskimos
- 1975: Winnipeg Blue Bombers
- 1975: Calgary Stampeders

Awards and highlights
- Grey Cup champion (1975)

David Campbell (born c. 1951) is a retired Canadian football player who played for the Edmonton Eskimos, Calgary Stampeders and Winnipeg Blue Bombers. He won the Grey Cup with Edmonton in 1975. He played college football at Queen's University.
