= Brian Jones (Canadian football linebacker) =

Canadian football player (born 1950)

Profile
- Position: Linebacker

Personal information
- Born: 1950 (age 75–76)
- Listed height: 6 ft 2 in (1.88 m)
- Listed weight: 215 lb (98 kg)

Career information
- University: Alberta
- CFL draft: 1973: 7th round, 56th overall pick

Career history
- 1975: Edmonton Eskimos

Awards and highlights
- Grey Cup champion (1975)

Brian Jones (born c. 1950) is a retired Canadian football player who played for the Edmonton Eskimos. He played college football at the University of Alberta.
