= Garry Adam =

Canadian football defensive tackle

Profile
- Position: Defensive tackle

Personal information
- Born: May 29, 1947 (age 79)
- Listed height: 6 ft 4 in (1.93 m)
- Listed weight: 240 lb (109 kg)

Career information
- University: Alberta

Career history
- 1973: Edmonton Eskimos

Garry Adam (born May 29, 1947) is a Canadian football defensive tackle who played for the Edmonton Eskimos of the Canadian Football League. He was signed by the Eskimos in 1973, who used a territorial exemption to select him. Adam played in four regular season games in his rookie year.
