= Pat Bonnett =

Canadian gridiron football player (born 1951)

Profile
- Positions: Guard, defensive end

Personal information
- Born: September 11, 1951 (age 75); Montreal, Quebec, Canada
- Listed height: 6 ft 3 in (1.91 m)
- Listed weight: 233 lb (106 kg)

Career information
- College: Idaho State University

Career history
- 1973–1979: Montreal Alouettes

Awards and highlights
- 2× Grey Cup champion (1974, 1977)

Patrick Michael Joseph Bonnett (born September 11, 1951) is a former Grey Cup champion offensive lineman and defensive end who played seven seasons for the Montreal Alouettes of the Canadian Football League (CFL), winning two Grey Cup Championships.
