= Art Edgson =

Canadian gridiron football player (born 1949)

Profile
- Position: Defensive back

Personal information
- Born: July 1, 1949 (age 77); Duncan, British Columbia, Canada
- Listed height: 5 ft 10 in (1.78 m)
- Listed weight: 185 lb (84 kg)

Career information
- College: Idaho State University, Brigham Young University

Career history
- 1974–1975: Montreal Alouettes (CFL)

Awards and highlights
- Grey Cup champion (1974)

Art Edgson (born July 1, 1949) is a former Grey Cup champion defensive back who played for the Montreal Alouettes of the Canadian Football League, winning a Grey Cup Championship in 1974.
