= Joe Worobec =

Gridiron football player

Profile
- Position: Guard

Personal information
- Born: November 15, 1951 (age 74)
- Listed height: 6 ft 4 in (1.93 m)
- Listed weight: 255 lb (116 kg)

Career information
- College: Drake

Career history
- 1973–1976: Edmonton Eskimos
- 1977: Hamilton Tiger-Cats
- 1978: Saskatchewan Roughriders

Awards and highlights
- Grey Cup champion (1975)

Joe Worobec (born November 15, 1951) is a retired Canadian football player who played for the Edmonton Eskimos, Saskatchewan Roughriders, and Hamilton Tiger-Cats. He played college football at Drake University.
