= 1980 Toronto Argonauts season =

CFL team season

- Head coach: Willie Wood
- Home stadium: Exhibition Stadium

Results
- Record: 6–10
- Division place: 4th, East
- Playoffs: did not qualify

Uniform

The 1980 Toronto Argonauts finished in fourth place in the Eastern Conference with a 6–10 record and failed to make the playoffs.

== Offseason ==
The Toronto Argonauts drafted the following players in the 1980 CFL draft.

Round	Pick	Player	Position	School
T	T	Phil Jones	Defensive back	Simon Fraser
1	1	Greg Barrow	Offensive line	Florida
2	15	Tom Stevenson	Tight end	Valley City State
4	28	Robert Kiviranta	Defensive end	Emporia State
5	37	Rick Kalvaitis	Defensive tackle	Wilfird Laurier
6	46	David Marinucci	Fullback	Queen's
7	55	Todd Krohn	Tackle	Southern Oregon State

== Regular season ==
=== Standings ===
Eastern Football Conference
Team	GP	W	L	T	PF	PA	Pts
Hamilton Tiger-Cats	16	8	7	1	332	377	17
Montreal Alouettes	16	8	8	0	356	375	16
Ottawa Rough Riders	16	7	9	0	353	393	14
Toronto Argonauts	16	6	10	0	334	358	12

=== Schedule ===
Week	Date	Opponent	Result	Record	Venue	Attendance
1	July 9	vs. Montreal Alouettes	W 18–11	1–0	Exhibition Stadium	35,250
2	July 16	at Winnipeg Blue Bombers	W 20–17	2–0	Winnipeg Stadium	20,980
3	July 23	vs. Ottawa Rough Riders	L 16–20	2–1	Exhibition Stadium	40,112
4	July 29	at Ottawa Rough Riders	W 18–10	3–1	Lansdowne Park	28,742
5	Aug 6	vs. Edmonton Eskimos	L 3–23	3–2	Exhibition Stadium	48,595
6	Aug 13	vs. Hamilton Tiger-Cats	L 16–18	3–3	Exhibition Stadium	45,201
7	Bye					
8	Aug 26	at Montreal Alouettes	L 33–43	3–4	Olympic Stadium	29,256
8	Sept 1	at Hamilton Tiger-Cats	L 2–23	3–5	Ivor Wynne Stadium	30,229
9	Sept 6	vs. Montreal Alouettes	L 24–35	3–6	Exhibition Stadium	37,214
10	Sept 14	at Saskatchewan Roughriders	W 28–17	4–6	Taylor Field	25,448
11	Sept 21	vs. Ottawa Rough Riders	W 41–17	5–6	Exhibition Stadium	33,156
12	Sept 27	at Montreal Alouettes	L 23–29	5–7	Olympic Stadium	31,633
13	Oct 5	at Calgary Stampeders	L 14–27	5–8	McMahon Stadium	30,265
14	Bye					
15	Oct 19	vs. Hamilton Tiger-Cats	L 24–25	5–9	Exhibition Stadium	34,150
16	Oct 26	vs. BC Lions	W 38–20	6–9	Exhibition Stadium	30,175
17	Nov 2	at Hamilton Tiger-Cats	L 16–23	6–10	Ivor Wynne Stadium	30,479

== Roster ==
1980 Toronto Argonauts final roster
Quarterbacks: 11 Tony Adams; 8 Mark Jackson; 5 Jimmy Streater; Running backs: 39 Bill Harrison; 21 Terry Metcalf; Wide receivers: 15 Bob Gaddis; 10 Terry Greer; 32 Dave Newman; 25 Paul Pearson; 34 Steve Stapler; Tight ends: 72 Peter Muller	Offensive linemen: 61 Rusty Brown G; 56 John Foubert T; 58 Bruce Kimball G; 68 Alan MacLean C; 63 John Malinosky T; 69 Bill Norton G; 51 Mike Obrovac G/T; 50 Kevin Powell T; Defensive linemen: 54 Bruce Clark DE; 79 Jim Corrigall DE; 73 Norm Goodman DE; 75 Gord Judges DT; 62 Rick Kalvaitis DT; 64 Leon Lyszkiewicz DT; 70 Brent Racette DT	Linebackers: 49 Danny Bass; 53 Darrell Burko; 35 Blain Lamoureaux; 52 Duncan MacKinlay; 76 John Martini; 78 Tom Rusk; 71 Ron Southwick; Defensive backs: 30 Billy Hardee; 12 Phil Jones; 29 Derrick Martin; 17 Ron Meeks; 14 Mike Williams; 28 Preston Young; Special teams: 19 Zenon Andrusyshyn K/P; Injured list: Calvin Muhammad WR; Italics indicate International player

== Awards and honours ==
=== 1980 CFL All-Stars ===
- DT – Bruce Clark, CFL All-Star

=== 1980 Eastern All-Stars ===
- SB – Dave Newman, CFL Eastern All-Star
- WR – Bob Gaddis, CFL Eastern All-Star
- P – Zenon Andrusyshyn, CFL Eastern All-Star
- DT – Bruce Clark, CFL Eastern All-Star
- DE – Jim Corrigall, CFL Eastern All-Star
- DB – Billy Hardee, CFL Eastern All-Star
