= 1980 Edmonton Eskimos season =

Canadian football team season

- General manager: Norm Kimball
- Head coach: Hugh Campbell
- Home stadium: Commonwealth Stadium

Results
- Record: 13–3
- Division place: 1st, West
- Playoffs: Won Grey Cup

Uniform

The 1980 Edmonton Eskimos finished in first place in the Western Conference with a 13–3–0 record and completed a three-peat after winning their third consecutive Grey Cup after winning the 68th Grey Cup.

== Pre-season ==
=== Schedule ===
Game	Date	Opponent	Results		Venue	Attendance
Game	Date	Opponent	Score	Record	Venue	Attendance
A	June 14	vs. Saskatchewan Roughriders	W 42–14	1–0		41,170
B	June 18	at Ottawa Rough Riders	W 25–13	2–0		17,231
C	June 28	at Calgary Stampeders	L 16–28	2–1		30,005
D	July 2	vs. Toronto Argonauts	W 35–15	3–1		42,778*

*Top attendance of preseason

== Regular season ==
=== Season standings ===
Western Football Conference
Team	GP	W	L	T	PF	PA	Pts
Edmonton Eskimos	16	13	3	0	505	281	26
Winnipeg Blue Bombers	16	10	6	0	394	387	20
Calgary Stampeders	16	9	7	0	407	355	18
BC Lions	16	8	7	1	381	351	17
Saskatchewan Roughriders	16	2	14	0	284	469	4

=== Season schedule ===
Week	Game	Date	Opponent	Results		Venue	Attendance
Week	Game	Date	Opponent	Score	Record	Venue	Attendance
1	1	July 9	vs. Winnipeg Blue Bombers	W 36–13	1–0		42,778
2	2	July 16	at Saskatchewan Roughriders	W 21–6	2–0		22,145
3	Bye						
4	3	July 30	vs. BC Lions	W 33–21	3–0		42,887
5	4	Aug 6	at Toronto Argonauts	W 23–3	4–0		48,595
6	5	Aug 13	at Winnipeg Blue Bombers	W 30–17	5–0		26,422
7	6	Aug 19	vs. Calgary Stampeders	L 15–16	5–1		42,778
8	7	Aug 26	vs. Ottawa Rough Riders	W 45–20	6–1		42,728
8	8	Sept 1	at Calgary Stampeders	W 38–23	7–1		34,562
9	9	Sept 7	vs. Hamilton Tiger-Cats	W 53–18	8–1		43,460
10	10	Sept 13	at BC Lions	W 42–14	9–1		30,793
11	11	Sept 21	vs. Saskatchewan Roughriders	W 24–17	10–1		35,328
12	Bye						
13	12	Oct 5	at Winnipeg Blue Bombers	L 14–28	10–2		28,238
14	13	Oct 13	vs. BC Lions	W 33–9	11–2		43,346
15	14	Oct 19	at Saskatchewan Roughriders	W 29–28	12–2		23,744
16	15	Oct 26	vs. Calgary Stampeders	L 25–34	12–3		43,346
17	16	Nov 1	at Montreal Alouettes	W 44–14	13–3		42,234

Total attendance: 336,651
Average attendance: 42,081 (97.1%)

== Playoffs ==
Round	Date	Opponent	Results		Venue	Attendance
Round	Date	Opponent	Score	Record	Venue	Attendance
Division Final	Nov 15	vs. Winnipeg Blue Bombers	W 34–24	1–0		43,346*
Grey Cup	Nov 23	vs. Hamilton Tiger-Cats	W 48–10	2–0		54,661

*Top playoff attendance of season

=== Grey Cup ===
Teams	1 Q	2 Q	3 Q	4 Q	Final
Edmonton Eskimos	10	14	10	14	48
Hamilton Tiger-Cats	3	6	1	0	10

=== Awards and honours ===
- CFL's Most Outstanding Defensive Player Award – Danny Kepley (LB)
- CFL's Most Outstanding Offensive Lineman Award – Mike Wilson (OT)
- Dave Dryburgh Memorial Trophy – Dave Cutler
- Dick Suderman Trophy – Dale Potter
- Dr. Beattie Martin Trophy – Dave "Dr. Death" Fennell
- Grey Cup Most Valuable Player (Offence) – Tom Wilkinson
- Grey Cup Most Valuable Player (Defence) – Dale Potter
- Norm Fieldgate Trophy – Danny Kepley

== Roster ==
1980 Edmonton Eskimos final roster
**Quarterbacks**: 1 Warren Moon; 12 Tom Wilkinson; **Running backs**: 25 Jim Germany; 32 Neil Lumsden; 23 Angelo Santucci; **Receivers**: 76 Danny Buggs; 77 Brian Fryer; 70 Brian Kelly; 15 Stu Lang; 74 Ernie Pough; 22 Tom Scott; 73 Randy Simmrin; 71 Waddell Smith	**Offensive linemen**: 59 Leo Blanchard G; 53 Bob Howes C; 56 Ted Milian C; 63 Hector Pothier T/G; 62 Bill Stevenson T/G; 57 Eric Upton G; 44 Mark Wald C; 67 Mike Wilson T; **Defensive linemen**: 68 Bob Barber DE; 64 David Boone DE; 55 Ron Estay DE; 65 Dave Fennell DT; 69 York Hentschel DT/DE; 58 Dan Kearns DT/DE	**Linebackers**: 42 Danny Kepley; 40 James Parker; 30 Dale Potter; 20 Tom Towns; **Defensive backs**: 28 Gregg Butler; 37 Emilio Fraietta; 13 Larry Highbaugh; 29 Joe Hollimon; 24 Ed Jones; 7 Pete Lavorato; 18 Mike McLeod; **Special teams**: 26 Dave Cutler K; 8 Hank Ilesic P; Italics indicate American player. **Bold** indicates Global player
