= 1980 Calgary Stampeders season =

Canadian football team season

- General manager: Jack Gotta
- Head coach: Ardell Wiegandt
- Home stadium: McMahon Stadium

Results
- Record: 9–7
- Division place: 3rd, West
- Playoffs: Lost Western Semi-Final

The 1980 Calgary Stampeders finished in third place in the Western Conference with a 9–7 record. They appeared in the Western Semi-Final where they lost to the Winnipeg Blue Bombers.

== Regular season ==
=== Season standings ===
Western Football Conference
Team	GP	W	L	T	PF	PA	Pts
Edmonton Eskimos	16	13	3	0	505	281	26
Winnipeg Blue Bombers	16	10	6	0	394	387	20
Calgary Stampeders	16	9	7	0	407	355	18
BC Lions	16	8	7	1	381	351	17
Saskatchewan Roughriders	16	2	14	0	284	469	4

=== Season schedule ===
Week	Game	Date	Opponent	Results		Venue	Attendance
Week	Game	Date	Opponent	Score	Record	Venue	Attendance
1	1	Tue, July 8	at Ottawa Rough Riders	L 20–26	0–1	Lansdowne Park	21,064
2	2	Tue, July 15	vs. Montreal Alouettes	W 19–8	1–1	McMahon Stadium	32,663
3	3	Wed, July 23	vs. Saskatchewan Roughriders	W 40–24	2–1	McMahon Stadium	30,524
4	4	Tue, July 29	at Winnipeg Blue Bombers	L 18–35	2–2	Winnipeg Stadium	20,774
5	5	Tue, Aug 5	at BC Lions	L 23–31	2–3	Empire Stadium	25,465
6	6	Tue, Aug 12	vs. BC Lions	W 24–7	3–3	McMahon Stadium	34,134
7	7	Tue, Aug 19	at Edmonton Eskimos	W 16–15	4–3	Commonwealth Stadium	42,778
8	8	Mon, Sept 1	vs. Edmonton Eskimos	L 23–38	4–4	McMahon Stadium	34,562
9	9	Sun, Sept 7	at Winnipeg Blue Bombers	L 29–30	4–5	Winnipeg Stadium	25,784
10	Bye						
11	10	Sat, Sept 20	vs. BC Lions	W 24–16	5–5	McMahon Stadium	32,749
12	11	Sun, Sept 28	at Saskatchewan Roughriders	L 14–18	5–6	Taylor Field	24,607
13	12	Sun, Oct 5	vs. Toronto Argonauts	W 27–14	6–6	McMahon Stadium	29,914
14	13	Mon, Oct 13	at Hamilton Tiger-Cats	L 28–30	6–7	Ivor Wynne Stadium	19,989
15	14	Sun, Oct 19	vs. Winnipeg Blue Bombers	W 31–28	7–7	McMahon Stadium	31,132
16	15	Sun, Oct 26	at Edmonton Eskimos	W 34–28	8–7	Commonwealth Stadium	43,346
17	16	Sun, Nov 2	vs. Saskatchewan Roughriders	W 37–10	9–7	McMahon Stadium	31,979

== Playoffs ==
=== West Semi-Final ===
Team	Q1	Q2	Q3	Q4	Total
Calgary Stampeders	0	7	7	0	14
Winnipeg Blue Bombers	21	2	0	9	32

== Roster ==
1980 Calgary Stampeders final roster
Quarterbacks: 19 Ken Johnson; 17 Bruce Threadgill; Running backs: 10 Willie Burden; 6 Rob Forbes; 11 James Sykes; Wide receivers: 18 Willie Armstead; 22 Tom Forzani; 14 Kelvin Kirk; 9 Mike McTague P; 3 Ron Robinson; Tight ends: 70 Bob Viccars	Offensive linemen: 66 Lloyd Fairbanks T; 67 Myke Horton T; 69 Dave Kirzinger G/T; 56 Tom Krebs G; 54 Bob Lubig G; 65 Mark Moors C; Defensive linemen: 62 Ken Dombrowski DT; 52 Miles Gorrell DT; 47 Andy Jonassen DE; 60 Reggie Lewis DE; 64 Ed McAleney DT; 63 Ronnie Paggett DE	Linebackers: 25 Doug Battershill; 72 Bernie Morrison; 46 Mark Nelson; 31 John Palazeti FB; Defensive backs: 27 Al Burleson; 16 Jim Burrow; 7 Lepoleon Ingram; 28 Terry Irvin; 8 Rob Kochel; 4 Darrell Moir WR; 32 Ray Odums; 24 Tom Reimer; 26 Merv Walker; Special teams: 2 J. T. Hay K; Italics indicate International player

== Awards and records ==
=== 1980 CFL All-Stars ===
- RB – James Sykes, CFL All-Star
- DE – Reggie Lewis, CFL All-Star
- DB – Ray Odums, CFL All-Star

=== Western All-Stars ===
- RB – James Sykes, CFL Western All-Star
- OG – Myke Horton, CFL Western All-Star
- DT – Ed McAleney, CFL Western All-Star
- DE – Reggie Lewis, CFL Western All-Star
- DB – Ray Odums, CFL Western All-Star
