= 1980 Hamilton Tiger-Cats season =

Season of Canadian Football League team the Hamilton Tiger-Cats

- Head coach: John Payne
- Home stadium: Ivor Wynne Stadium

Results
- Record: 8–7–1
- Division place: 1st, East
- Playoffs: Lost Grey Cup
- Team MOP: Jerry Anderson
- Team MOC: Bernie Ruoff
- Team MOR: Jim Muller

The 1980 Hamilton Tiger-Cats season was the 23rd season for the team in the Canadian Football League (CFL) and their 31st overall. The Tiger-Cats finished in first place in the Eastern Conference with an 8–7–1 record. They appeared in the 68th Grey Cup game, but lost to the Edmonton Eskimos, who won their third straight championship.

== Preseason ==
Week	Date	Opponent	Result	Record
B	June 11	at Toronto Argonauts	W 37–29	1–0
B	June 16	vs. BC Lions	W 29–19	2–0
C	June 22	at Saskatchewan Roughriders	W 41–7	3–0
E	July 4	vs. Montreal Alouettes	L 17–21	3–1

== Regular season ==
=== Season standings ===
Eastern Football Conference
Team	GP	W	L	T	PF	PA	Pts
Hamilton Tiger-Cats	16	8	7	1	332	377	17
Montreal Alouettes	16	8	8	0	356	375	16
Ottawa Rough Riders	16	7	9	0	353	393	14
Toronto Argonauts	16	6	10	0	334	358	12

=== Season schedule ===
Week	Game	Date	Opponent	Result	Record
1	Bye				
2	1	July 15	vs. Ottawa Rough Riders	W 41–23	1–0
3	2	July 22	at Montreal Alouettes	L 14–17	1–1
4	3	July 30	vs. Saskatchewan Roughriders	L 18–19	1–2
5	4	Aug 5	at Ottawa Rough Riders	W 13–3	2–2
6	5	Aug 13	at Toronto Argonauts	W 18–16	3–2
7	6	Aug 20	vs. Winnipeg Blue Bombers	L 22–30	3–3
8	7	Aug 26	vs. BC Lions	T 17–17	3–3–1
9	8	Sept 1	vs. Toronto Argonauts	W 23–2	4–3–1
10	9	Sept 7	at Edmonton Eskimos	L 18–53	4–4–1
11	10	Sept 13	vs. Montreal Alouettes	L 14–25	4–5–1
12	11	Sept 21	at Montreal Alouettes	L 10–49	4–6–1
13	12	Sept 28	vs. Ottawa Rough Riders	W 29–24	5–6–1
14	Bye				
15	13	Oct 13	vs. Calgary Stampeders	W 30–28	6–6–1
16	14	Oct 19	at Toronto Argonauts	W 25–24	7–6–1
17	15	Oct 25	at Ottawa Rough Riders	L 26–27	7–7–1
18	16	Nov 2	vs. Toronto Argonauts	W 23–16	8–7–1

== Postseason ==
=== Schedule ===
Round	Date	Opponent	Results		Venue	Attendance
Round	Date	Opponent	Score	Record	Venue	Attendance
East Final	Nov 16	vs. Montreal Alouettes	W 24–13	1–0	Ivor Wynne Stadium	
Grey Cup	Nov 23	vs. Edmonton Eskimos	L 10–48	1–1	Exhibition Stadium	

==== Grey Cup ====
Teams	Q1	Q2	Q3	Q4	Final
Hamilton Tiger-Cats	3	6	1	0	10
Edmonton Eskimos	10	14	10	14	48

== Roster ==
1980 Hamilton Tiger-Cats final roster
Quarterbacks: 7 Bruce Lemmerman; 8 Dave Marler; 19 Tom Rozantz; Running backs: 35 Phil Colwell; 24 Rufus Crawford; 3 Obie Graves; 20 John McCorquindale; Wide receivers: 21 Ross Clarkson; 25 Marco Cyncar K; 73 John Holland; 74 Rick Kuchma; 71 Leif Pettersen; 70 Don Ross	Tight ends: 23 Rocky Dipietro; Offensive linemen: 59 Ed Fulton G/T; 65 Ed George T; 63 Ray Honey G/T; 66 Willie Martin T; 56 Alan Moffat G/DT; 67 Doug Redl C; 50 Henry Waszczuk C; Defensive linemen: 79 Linden Davidson DT; 69 Jim Muller DE; 68 Jim Ramey DT; 60 Drew Taylor DE; 51 Ian Ward DT/DE; 76 Lyall Woznesensky DE/DT	Linebackers: 39 Lou Clare; 55 Carl Crennel; 36 John Priestner; 31 Ben Zambiasi; Defensive backs: 17 Jerry Anderson; 14 Randy Graham; 34 Emil Nielsen; 27 Leroy Paul; 37 David Shaw; 6 Harold Woods; Special teams: 10 Bernie Ruoff K/P; Injured list: 22 Gord Paterson WR; Italics indicate American players

== Awards and honours ==
=== 1980 CFL All-Stars ===
- Bernie Ruoff, Punter
- David Shaw, Defensive back
- Ben Zambiasi, Linebacker
