= 1980 Winnipeg Blue Bombers season =

Canadian football team season

- General manager: Earl Lunsford
- Head coach: Ray Jauch
- Home stadium: Winnipeg Stadium

Results
- Record: 10–6
- Division place: 2nd, West
- Playoffs: Lost Western Final

Uniform

The 1980 Winnipeg Blue Bombers finished in second place in the Western Conference with a 10–6 record. They appeared in the Western Final but lost 34–24 to the Edmonton Eskimos.

== Offseason ==
=== CFL draft ===
Round	Pick	Player	Position	School
T	T	George Siedel	OT	Montana
1	3	Ken Ciancone	LB	Utah State
3	19	Rob Bunce	DE	Saskatchewan
3	21	Vernon Pahl	G	Prince Edward Island
4	30	Brian Perkins	OT	Saskatchewan
5	39	Peter Mamer	DE	Saskatchewan
6	48	Mike Danese	LB	Toronto
7	57	Mike Topolovec	DE	Ottawa

== Roster ==
1980 Winnipeg Blue Bombers final roster
Quarterbacks: 5 Dieter Brock; 10 Jim Krohn; Running backs: 22 Mark Bragagnolo; 30 Dan Huclack; 33 William Miller; 65 Mike Richardson; Receivers: 14 Brock Aynsley; 80 Tom Cudney; 29 Larry Douglas; 34 Eugene Goodlow; 70 Mike Holmes; 31 Rick House; 28 Ian Mofford; 79 Bob O'Doherty; 71 Joe Poplawski; 23 Robert Woods	Offensive linemen: 58 Marv Allemang G/T; 65 Nick Bastaja G; 43 John Bonk C; 68 Larry Butler G; 66 Butch Norman T; 50 Willie Thomas G/C; 61 Bobby Thompson T; 56 Ken Times G; Defensive linemen: 74 Ecomet Burley DT; 60 Ron Cherkas DT; 99 John Helton DE; 78 Jeff Henry DT; 55 Tony Norman DE; 67 Mike Topolevec DE/DT	Linebackers: 72 Leo Ezerins; 54 Vernon Pahl; 57 James Reed; 32 Bob Toogood; Defensive backs: 27 Paul Bennett; 25 Harry Kruger; 9 Vince Phason; 8 Reggie Pierson; 21 Gary Rosolowich; 20 Charles Williams; Special teams: 6 Bob Cameron P; 3 Trevor Kennerd K; Italics indicate American player

== Preseason ==
Game	Date	Opponent	Results		Venue	Attendance
Game	Date	Opponent	Score	Record	Venue	Attendance
A	Tue, June 10	vs. Montreal Alouettes	L 20–26	0–1	Winnipeg Stadium	20,133
B	Sun, June 15	at Calgary Stampeders	L 23–25	0–2	McMahon Stadium	27,698
C	Wed, June 25	at Toronto Argonauts	W 20–16	1–2	Exhibition Stadium	28,101
D	Tue, July 1	vs. BC Lions	W 26–22	2–2	Winnipeg Stadium	17,806

== Regular season ==
=== Schedule ===
Week	Game	Date	Opponent	Results		Venue	Attendance
Week	Game	Date	Opponent	Score	Record	Venue	Attendance
1	1	Wed, July 9	at Edmonton Eskimos	L 13–36	0–1	Commonwealth Stadium	42,778
2	2	Wed, July 16	vs. Toronto Argonauts	L 17–20	0–2	Winnipeg Stadium	20,980
3	3	Tue, July 22	at BC Lions	L 6–26	0–3	Empire Stadium	23,214
4	4	Tue, July 29	vs. Calgary Stampeders	W 35–18	1–3	Winnipeg Stadium	20,774
5	Bye						
6	5	Wed, Aug 13	vs. Edmonton Eskimos	L 17–30	1–4	Winnipeg Stadium	26,422
7	6	Wed, Aug 20	at Hamilton Tiger-Cats	W 34–13	2–4	Ivor Wynne Stadium	24,152
8	7	Wed, Aug 27	vs. Saskatchewan Roughriders	W 32–29	3–4	Winnipeg Stadium	22,154
8	8	Mon, Sept 1	vs. Saskatchewan Roughriders	W 32–29	4–4	Winnipeg Stadium	25,699
9	9	Sun, Sept 7	vs. Calgary Stampeders	W 30–29	5–4	Winnipeg Stadium	25,784
10	10	Sun, Sept 14	at Ottawa Rough Riders	W 20–19	6–4	Lansdowne Park	21,241
11	Bye						
12	11	Sun, Sept 28	vs. BC Lions	W 28–22	7–4	Winnipeg Stadium	29,622
13	12	Sun, Oct 5	vs. Edmonton Eskimos	W 28–14	8–4	Winnipeg Stadium	28,238
14	13	Sun, Oct 12	at Saskatchewan Roughriders	W 39–16	9–4	Taylor Field	23,938
15	14	Sun, Oct 19	at Calgary Stampeders	L 28–31	9–5	McMahon Stadium	31,132
16	15	Sun, Oct 26	vs. Montreal Alouettes	W 26–25	10–5	Winnipeg Stadium	26,352
16	16	Sun, Nov 2	at BC Lions	L 17–43	10–6	Empire Stadium	16,676

== Playoffs ==
=== West Semi-Final ===
Team	Q1	Q2	Q3	Q4	Total
Calgary Stampeders	?	?	?	?	14
Winnipeg Blue Bombers	?	?	?	?	32

=== West Final ===
Team	Q1	Q2	Q3	Q4	Total
Winnipeg Blue Bombers	?	?	?	?	24
Edmonton Eskimos	?	?	?	?	34
