= 1980 BC Lions season =

Canadian football team season

- General manager: Bob Ackles
- Head coach: Vic Rapp
- Home stadium: Empire Stadium

Results
- Record: 8–7–1
- Division place: 4th, West
- Playoffs: did not qualify

The 1980 BC Lions finished in fourth place in the Western Conference with an 8–7–1 record. Despite the winning record, they still failed to make the playoffs.

Joe Paopao took over as the starting quarterback, due to Jerry Tagge's career ending knee injury. Due to injuries to Paopao, rookie Roy Dewalt also got six starts at pivot.

With Larry Key missing half the season, John Henry White was the Lions main offensive threat with 834 rushing yards and 283 receiving yards. Harry Holt had a great season at tight end with 648 yards receiving and 6 touchdowns.

Centre Al Wilson (for 6th consecutive year) and Harry Holt were named to the CFL All-star team.

== Offseason ==
=== CFL draft ===
Round	Pick	Player	Position	School

== Preseason ==
Game	Date	Opponent	Results		Venue	Attendance
Game	Date	Opponent	Score	Record	Venue	Attendance

== Regular season ==
=== Season standings ===
Western Football Conference
Team	GP	W	L	T	PF	PA	Pts
Edmonton Eskimos	16	13	3	0	505	281	26
Winnipeg Blue Bombers	16	10	6	0	394	387	20
Calgary Stampeders	16	9	7	0	407	355	18
BC Lions	16	8	7	1	381	351	17
Saskatchewan Roughriders	16	2	14	0	284	469	4

=== Season schedule ===
Week	Game	Date	Opponent	Results	
Week	Game	Date	Opponent	Score	Record
1	1	July 8	vs. Saskatchewan Roughriders	W 39–24	1–0
2	Bye				
3	2	July 22	vs. Winnipeg Blue Bombers	W 26–6	2–0
4	3	July 30	at Edmonton Eskimos	L 21–33	2–1
5	4	Aug 5	vs. Calgary Stampeders	W 31–23	3–1
6	5	Aug 12	at Calgary Stampeders	L 17–24	3–2
7	6	Aug 20	at Saskatchewan Roughriders	W 31–21	4–2
8	7	Aug 26	vs. Hamilton Tiger-Cats	T 17–17	4–2–1
9	8	Sept 1	at Montreal Alouettes	W 14–6	5–2–1
10	Bye				
11	9	Sept 13	vs. Edmonton Eskimos	L 14–42	5–3–1
12	10	Sept 20	at Calgary Stampeders	L 16–24	5–4–1
13	11	Sept 28	at Winnipeg Blue Bombers	L 22–28	5–5–1
14	12	Oct 4	vs. Saskatchewan Roughriders	W 44–8	6–5–1
15	13	Oct 13	at Edmonton Eskimos	L 9–33	6–6–1
16	14	Oct 18	vs. Ottawa Rough Riders	W 27–7	7–6–1
17	15	Oct 26	at Toronto Argonauts	L 20–38	7–7–1
18	16	Nov 2	vs. Winnipeg Blue Bombers	W 43–17	8–7–1

=== Offensive leaders ===
Player	Passing yds	Rushing yds	Receiving yds	TD
Joe Paopao	2009	57	0	0
Roy Dewalt	616	253	0	2
John Henry White		834	283	5
Al Charuk		0	674	7
Harry Holt		103	648	6
Larry Key		491	94	5
Tyrone Gray		0	349	3

== Roster ==
1980 BC Lions final roster
Quarterbacks: 9 Roy Dewalt; 12 Mike Nott; 6 Joe Paopao; Running backs: 70 Mark Houghton; 11 Larry Key; 19 Don Taylor; 20 John Henry White; Wide receivers: 36 Terry Bailey; 25 Al Charuk; 32 Ty Gray; 21 John Pankratz; Tight ends: 7 Ricky Ellis; 72 Harry Holt; 34 Steve Kearns	Offensive linemen: 68 John Blain G/T; 69 John Blake G/T; 62 Donnie Hickman T; 51 Tom Kudaba G; 54 Glenn Leonhard G; 55 Jim Lohmann T; 52 Al Wilson C; Defensive linemen: 63 Rick Goltz DT; 56 Nick Hebeler DE; 65 Franklin King DT; 71 Richard Murray DE; 61 Doug Seymour DT	Linebackers: 45 Sam Britts; 37 Glen Jackson; 31 Kevin Konar; 44 Ron Morehouse; Defensive backs: 10 John Beaton; 26 Leon Bright; 16 Devon Ford; 14 Joe Fourqurean; 18 Ken Hinton; 3 Hal Lund; 17 Kerry Parker; 27 Tony Proudfoot; Special teams: 5 Lui Passaglia K/P; Italics indicate International player

== Awards and records ==
=== 1980 CFL All-Stars ===
- C – Al Wilson, CFL All-Star

=== 1980 CFL Western All-Stars ===
- TE – Harry Holt, CFL Western All-Star
- C – Al Wilson, CFL Western All-Star
