= 1980 Ottawa Rough Riders season =

Canadian football team season

- Owner: Allan Waters
- General manager: Jake Dunlap
- Head coach: George Brancato
- Home stadium: Lansdowne Park

Results
- Record: 7–9
- Division place: 3rd, East
- Playoffs: Lost East Semi-Final

Uniform

The 1980 Ottawa Rough Riders finished the season in third place in the Eastern Conference with a 7–9 record. They lost the East Semi-Final to the Montreal Alouettes.

== Offseason ==
=== CFL draft ===
Rd	Pick	Player	Position	School
0	0	Gary Cook	SB	Carleton
0	0	Glenn Cook	CB	Richmond
1	6	Pat McBride	OL	North Dakota State
2	11	Mark Philp	RB	Richmond
2	13	Neville Edwards	RB	Western Ontario
4	33	Wesley Woof	WR	Wilfrid Laurier
5	42	Steve Shubat	OT	York
6	51	Mike Szemeredy	TE	Toronto
7	60	Elwin Worobec	OG	Utah

=== Preseason ===
Date	Opponent	Result	Record	Venue	Attendance
June 10	at BC Lions	T 26–26	0–0–1		17,284
June 18	vs. Edmonton Eskimos	L 13–25	0–1–1		17,231
June 25	at Montreal Alouettes	L 24–34	0–2–1		28,352
July 1	vs. Saskatchewan Roughriders	W 29–3	1–2–1		16,765

== Regular season ==
=== Standings ===
Eastern Football Conference
Team	GP	W	L	T	PF	PA	Pts
Hamilton Tiger-Cats	16	8	7	1	332	377	17
Montreal Alouettes	16	8	8	0	356	375	16
Ottawa Rough Riders	16	7	9	0	353	393	14
Toronto Argonauts	16	6	10	0	334	358	12

=== Schedule ===
Week	Game	Date	Opponent	Results		Venue	Attendance
Week	Game	Date	Opponent	Score	Record	Venue	Attendance
1	1	July 8	vs. Calgary Stampeders	W 26–20	1–0		21,064
2	2	July 15	at Hamilton Tiger-Cats	L 23–41	1–1		23,100
3	3	July 23	at Toronto Argonauts	W 20–16	2–1		40,112
4	4	July 29	vs. Toronto Argonauts	L 10–18	2–2		28,742
5	5	Aug 5	vs. Hamilton Tiger-Cats	L 3–13	2–3		24,181
6	6	Aug 12	at Montreal Alouettes	W 27–17	3–3		34,426
7	7	Aug 18	vs. Montreal Alouettes	W 33–11	4–3		29,994
8	8	Aug 26	at Edmonton Eskimos	L 20–45	4–4		42,728
9	9	Sept 7	vs. Saskatchewan Roughriders	W 31–21	5–4		20,681
10	10	Sept 14	vs. Winnipeg Blue Bombers	L 19–20	5–5		21,241
11	11	Sept 21	at Toronto Argonauts	L 17–41	5–6		33,156
12	12	Sept 28	at Hamilton Tiger-Cats	L 24–49	5–7		18,383
13	13	Oct 5	vs. Montreal Alouettes	W 49–14	6–7		24,971
14	14	Oct 12	at Montreal Alouettes	L 17–34	6–8		31,919
15	15	Oct 18	at BC Lions	L 7–27	6–9		17,399
16	16	Oct 25	vs. Hamilton Tiger-Cats	W 27–26	7–9		21,788
17	Bye						

== Postseason ==
Round	Date	Opponent	Results		Venue	Attendance
Round	Date	Opponent	Score	Record	Venue	Attendance
East Semi-Final	Nov 8	at Montreal Alouettes	L 21–25	0–1		17,420

== Roster ==
1980 Ottawa Rough Riders final roster
Quarterbacks: 15 Ron Calcagni; 8 Jordan Case; 7 Condredge Holloway; Running backs: 33 Richard Crump; 30 Mike Murphy; 32 Jim Reid; Wide receivers: 18 Jeff Avery; 9 Steve Coury; 2 Martin Cox; 23 Pete Stenerson; 14 Pat Stoqua; 1 Bruce Walker; Tight ends: 77 Tony Gabriel	Offensive linemen: 68 Val Belcher G; 59 Malcolm Inglis T; 50 Pat McBride C; 65 Wes Phillips T; 64 Donn Smith T/C; 52 Pat Staub G; 55 Larry Tittley C; 57 Ray Watrin G/T; Defensive linemen: 66 Greg Marshall DE; 73 Jim Piaskoski DE; 79 Mike Raines DT; 69 Mike Riley DT; 61 Jimmy Walker DE	Linebackers: 43 Bill Banks; 41 Tim Berryman; 78 Ron Foxx; 76 John Glassford; 75 Rick Sowieta; Defensive backs: 26 Allen Archie; 20 Gary Cook; 22 Glenn Cook; 10 Peter Crepin; 28 Mike Davis; 17 Mark Philp; 34 John Sutton; 6 Maurice Tyler; Special teams: 71 Gerry Organ K/P; Italics indicate International player

== Awards and honours ==
=== CFL All-Stars ===
- TE – Tony Gabriel
- OG – Val Belcher

=== Eastern All-Stars ===
- RB – Richard Crump
- TE – Tony Gabriel
- OG – Val Belcher
- DT – Mike Raines
- LB – Ron Foxx
- LB – Rick Sowieta

=== CFL awards ===
- CFLPA's Most Outstanding Community Service Award – Jim Coode (OT)
