= 1980 Montreal Alouettes season =

Canadian football team season

- Head coach: Joe Scannella
- Home stadium: Olympic Stadium

Results
- Record: 8–8
- Division place: 2nd, East
- Playoffs: Lost Eastern Final

Uniform

The 1980 Montreal Alouettes finished the season in second place in the Eastern Conference with an 8–8 record. They appeared in the East Final, where they lost 24–13 to the Hamilton Tiger-Cats, ending their three-year reign as the East Conference representative in the Grey Cup.

== Preseason ==
Game	Date	Opponent	Results		Venue	Attendance
Game	Date	Opponent	Score	Record	Venue	Attendance
A	June 10	at Winnipeg Blue Bombers	W 26–20	1–0	Winnipeg Stadium	20,133
B	June 17	vs. Toronto Argonauts	W 31–16	2–0	Olympic Stadium	26,342
C	June 25	vs. Ottawa Rough Riders	W 34–24	3–0	Olympic Stadium	28,352
D	July 2	at Hamilton Tiger-Cats	W 21–17	4–0	Ivor Wynne Stadium	18,204

== Regular season ==
=== Standings ===
Eastern Football Conference
Team	GP	W	L	T	PF	PA	Pts
Hamilton Tiger-Cats	16	8	7	1	332	377	17
Montreal Alouettes	16	8	8	0	356	375	16
Ottawa Rough Riders	16	7	9	0	353	393	14
Toronto Argonauts	16	6	10	0	334	358	12

=== Schedule ===
Week	Game	Date	Opponent	Results		Venue	Attendance
Week	Game	Date	Opponent	Score	Record	Venue	Attendance
1	1	July 9	at Toronto Argonauts	L 11–18	0–1	Exhibition Stadium	34,250
2	2	July 15	at Calgary Stampeders	L 8–19	0–2	McMahon Stadium	32,663
3	3	July 22	vs. Hamilton Tiger-Cats	W 17–14	1–2	Olympic Stadium	32,048
4	Bye						
5	4	Aug 6	at Saskatchewan Roughriders	W 18–10	2–2	Taylor Field	25,947
6	5	Aug 12	vs. Ottawa Rough Riders	L 17–27	2–3	Olympic Stadium	34,426
6	6	Aug 18	at Ottawa Rough Riders	L 11–33	2–4	Lansdowne Park	29,994
7	Bye						
8	7	Aug 26	vs. Toronto Argonauts	W 43–33	3–4	Olympic Stadium	29,256
8	8	Sept 1	BC Lions	L 6–14	3–5	Olympic Stadium	29,827
9	9	Sept 6	Toronto Argonauts	W 35–24	4–5	Exhibition Stadium	37,214
10	10	Sept 13	at Hamilton Tiger-Cats	W 25–14	5–5	Ivor Wynne Stadium	19,619
11	11	Sept 21	vs. Hamilton Tiger-Cats	W 49–10	6–5	Olympic Stadium	28,185
12	12	Sept 27	vs. Toronto Argonauts	W 29–23	7–5	Olympic Stadium	31,633
13	13	Oct 5	at Ottawa Rough Riders	L 14–49	7–6	Lansdowne Park	24,971
14	14	Oct 12	vs. Ottawa Rough Riders	W 34–17	8–6	Olympic Stadium	31,919
15	Bye						
16	15	Oct 26	at Winnipeg Blue Bombers	L 25–26	8–7	Winnipeg Stadium	26,352
16	16	Nov 1	vs. Edmonton Eskimos	L 14–44	8–8	Olympic Stadium	42,234

== Postseason ==
Round	Date	Opponent	Results		Venue	Attendance
Round	Date	Opponent	Score	Record	Venue	Attendance
East Semi-Final	Nov 8	at Ottawa Rough Riders	W 25–21	1–0	Olympic Stadium	17,420
East Final	Nov 16	at Hamilton Tiger-Cats	L 13–24	1–1	Ivor Wynne Stadium	30,898

== Roster ==
1980 Montreal Alouettes final roster
**Quarterbacks**: 9 Gerry Dattilio; 19 Steve Grant; **Running backs**: 26 David Green; 10 Joe Hawco; 33 Chuck McMann; 35 Roland Sales; 36 Larry Smith; 32 Skip Walker; **Wide receivers**: 6 Keith Baker; 25 Fred Biletnikoff; 20 Keith Credit; **Tight ends**: 79 Nick Arakgi; 74 Peter Dalla Riva	**Offensive linemen**: 44 Mike Hameluck C/G; 58 Roland Mangold G; 61 Doug Payton T/G; 66 Larry Pfohl T; 53 Doug Smith C; 59 Ed Szpytma T; **Defensive linemen**: 77 Junior Ah You DE; 76 Gene Belliveau DT; 99 Gabriel Grégoire DE; 70 Doug Scott DE; 64 Glen Weir DT; 55 James Zachery DT	**Linebackers**: 39 Wally Buono; 45 Tom Cousineau; 47 Jerry Friesen; 62 Bill Hampton; **Defensive backs**: 37 Carl Brazley; 22 Al Chorney; 14 David Dumars; 27 Steve Gelley; 18 Dickie Harris; 21 Randy Rhino; 15 Woodrow Wilson; **Special teams**: 7 Gerry McGrath K/P; Italics indicate American players **Bold** indicates Global player
