= 1980 CFL draft =

Canadian football draft

The 1980 CFL draft composed of seven rounds where 80 Canadian football players were chosen from eligible Canadian universities and Canadian players playing in the NCAA. A total of 18 players were selected as territorial exemptions, with all nine teams making at least one selection in this stage of the draft.

== Territorial exemptions ==
Toronto Argonauts Phil Jones DB Simon Fraser

Saskatchewan Roughriders Gene Wall TB Saskatchewan

Saskatchewan Roughriders Jim Manz TB Saskatchewan

Winnipeg Blue Bombers George Siedel OT Montana

Hamilton Tiger-Cats Don Ross WR Acadia

Hamilton Tiger-Cats Ian Ward DT Western Ontario

British Columbia Lions Derek Innes LB Simon Fraser

British Columbia Lions John Pankratz WR Simon Fraser

Ottawa Rough Riders Gary Cook SB Carleton

Ottawa Rough Riders Glenn Cook CB Richmond

Calgary Stampeders Mark Nelson LB East Central

Calgary Stampeders Elwood Threlfall LB Utah State

Calgary Stampeders Steve Kearns TE Liberty Baptist

Montreal Alouettes Doug Scott DT Boise State

Montreal Alouettes Doug Gair WR Bishop's

Montreal Alouettes Tim Kist DE Manitoba

Edmonton Eskimos Pat Toth CB Alberta

Edmonton Eskimos Dale Getty DB Weber State

== 1st round ==
1. Toronto Argonauts Greg Barrow OL Florida

2. Saskatchewan Roughriders Jack Hirose DB British Columbia

3. Winnipeg Blue Bombers Ken Ciancone LB Utah State

4. Saskatchewan Roughriders Bob Fletcher P Northeast Missouri State

5. British Columbia Lions Kevin Konar LB British Columbia

6. Ottawa Roughriders Pat McBride C North Dakota State

7. Calgary Stampeders Sheldon Paris QB Kansas State

8. Montreal Alouettes Joe Hawko QB Toronto

9. Edmonton Eskimos Ross Francis DE Queen's

== 2nd round ==
10. Calgary Stampeders Ken Vallevand WR U.S. International

11. Ottawa Roughriders Mark Philp TB Richmond

12. Edmonton Eskimos Derry Donaldson TB Tulane

13. Ottawa Roughriders Neville Edwards TB Western Ontario

14. British Columbia Lions Paul Gohier OT McGill

15. Toronto Argonauts Tom Stevenson TE Valley City State

16. Calgary Stampeders Campbell Hackney LB Simon Fraser

17. Saskatchewan Roughriders Stewart Fraser FL New Brunswick

18. Edmonton Eskimos Dan Kearns DE Simon Fraser

== 3rd round ==
19. Winnipeg Blue Bombers Rob Bunce DE Saskatchewan

20. Saskatchewan Roughriders Charles Toth DB U.S. International

21. Winnipeg Blue Bombers Vernon Pahl G Prince Edward Island

22. Montreal Alouettes Jack Kutasiewich G Moorehead State

23. Montreal Alouettes Gene Belliveau DE St. Francis Xavier

24. Montreal Alouettes Ed McMillan DB Carleton

25. Calgary Stampeders Darcy Krogh WR Calgary

26. Hamilton Tiger-Cats Eddie Murray K Tulane University

27. Edmonton Eskimos Ed Gataveckas LB Acadia

== 4th round ==
28. Toronto Argonauts Robert Kiviranta DE Emporia State

29. Saskatchewan Roughriders Pat Hamilton DB U.S. International

30. Winnipeg Blue Bombers Brian Perkins T Saskatchewan

31. Hamilton Tiger-Cats David Yarmolulk TE Toronto

32. British Columbia Lions Michael Deslauriers QB British Columbia

33. Ottawa Roughriders Wesley Woof WR Wilfrid Laurier

34. Calgary Stampeders Barry McDonald C Montana Tech

35. Montreal Alouettes J.P. Normand WR Royal Military College

36. Edmonton Eskimos Bob Bridgeman DT Windsor

== 5th round ==
37. Toronto Argonauts Rick Kalvaitis DT Wilfrid Laurier

38. Saskatchewan Roughriders Larry Harbord OL British Columbia

39. Winnipeg Blue Bombers Peter Mamer DE Saskatchewan

40. Hamilton Tiger-Cats Jim Muller DE Queen's

41. British Columbia Lions Ted Bellinger WR Queen's

42. Ottawa Roughriders Steve Shubat T York

43. Calgary Stampeders Jud Mayes DB Boise State

44. Montreal Alouettes Mike Washburn WR New Brunswick

45. Edmonton Eskimos Francis Sheridan E Queen's

== 6th round ==
46. Toronto Argonauts David Marinucci FB Queen's

47. Saskatchewan Roughriders Ron Mackie LB Youngstown State

48. Winnipeg Blue Bombers Mike Danese LB Toronto

49. Hamilton Tiger-Cats Mark Sprague LB Wilfrid Laurier

50. British Columbia Lions Peter Wilson C Simon Fraser

51. Ottawa Roughriders Mike Szemeredy TE Toronto

52. Calgary Stampeders George Vasiladis DE Waterloo

53. Montreal Alouettes Gary Pooler WR Western Ontario

54. Edmonton Eskimos Richard Infantino DB Western Ontario

== 7th round ==
55. Toronto Argonauts Todd Krohn T Southern Oregon State

56. Saskatchewan Roughriders Jeff Neal WR Saint Mary's

57. Winnipeg Blue Bombers Mike Topolovec DE Ottawa

58. Hamilton Tiger-Cats Mike Giftopoulos HB Ottawa

59. British Columbia Lions Reg Advocat LB Simon Fraser

60. Ottawa Roughriders Elwin Worobec G Utah

61. Calgary Stampeders Brian Meagher LB/FB Mount Allison

62. Edmonton Eskimos Anthony Dippolito DE McMaster
