= Franklin King =

American gridiron football player (1957–2025)

Profile
- Position: Defensive lineman

Personal information
- Born: March 3, 1957; Pocatello, Idaho, U.S.
- Died: September 20, 2025 (aged 68); Flower Mound, Texas, U.S.
- Listed height: 6 ft 0 in (1.83 m)
- Listed weight: 255 lb (116 kg)

Career information
- College: Kansas
- NFL draft: 1979: undrafted

Career history
- Houston Oilers (1979)*; Cincinnati Bengals (1980)*; BC Lions (1980); Calgary Stampeders (1981–1982); Toronto Argonauts (1983–1984); Hamilton Tiger-Cats (1985)
- * Offseason or practice squad member only

Awards and highlights
- Grey Cup champion (1983)

Franklin Robert King Jr. (March 3, 1957 – September 20, 2025) was an American professional football player who was a defensive lineman in the Canadian Football League (CFL) for the BC Lions, Calgary Stampeders, Toronto Argonauts, and Hamilton Tiger-Cats. He played college football for the Kansas Jayhawks. He helped lead the Jawhawks to the 1975 Sun Bowl as co-captain.

King tried out with the Houston Oilers and Cincinnati Bengals of the National Football League (NFL) before joining the CFL's Lions in the middle of 1980 and playing in nine games. He was co-captain for the Toronto Argonauts winning the 1983 Grey Cup.

King died in Flower Mound, Texas, on September 20, 2025, at the age of 68.
