= Larry Tittley =

Canadian football player (born 1952)

No. 46
- Position: Centre

Personal information
- Born: May 15, 1952 (age 74); Montreal, Quebec, Canada

Career information
- College: Concordia University
- CFL draft: 1976: 5th round

Career history
- 1976–1979: Calgary Stampeders
- 1980–1984: Ottawa Rough Riders
- 1985: Montreal Concordes

Awards and highlights
- CFL All-Star (1983)

Laurent J. "Larry" Tittley (born May 15, 1952), was an all star offensive lineman in the Canadian Football League.

Tittley attended St. Thomas High School in Pointe Claire, Quebec, and played football at Vanier College. He has the unique distinction of having played football not only for his alma mater Concordia University, but for both its founding institutions, Loyola College and Sir George Williams University. He was a tackle and centre during his four-year university career. In 1986, he was named to Concordia's All-Ten Year Football Team. He graduated in 1978 with a BA.

He had a successful 10 year CFL career, playing with the Calgary Stampeders (1976 to 1979,) the Ottawa Rough Riders (1980 to 1984) and a final 3 games with the Montreal Concordes in 1985. He was an all star and played in the classic 69th Grey Cup in 1981 with Ottawa, where they came within seconds of one of the greatest upsets in CFL history.

He was inducted into the Concordia University Sports Hall of Fame in 1998.
