= Steve Kearns =

Canadian football player (born 1956)

No. 34
- Positions: Slotback, Tight end

Personal information
- Born: November 23, 1956 (age 69); São Luís, Maranhão, Brazil
- Listed height: 6 ft 2 in (1.88 m)
- Listed weight: 210 lb (95 kg)

Career information
- High school: Wexford (Scarborough, Ontario, Canada)
- College: Liberty
- CFL draft: 1980

Career history
- 1980–1982: BC Lions
- 1982–1985: Hamilton Tiger-Cats

Awards and highlights
- Second-team All-American (1978)

Steve Kearns (born November 23, 1956) is a Canadian former professional football slotback who played six seasons in the Canadian Football League (CFL) with the BC Lions and Hamilton Tiger-Cats. He was a territorial exemption of the Lions in the 1980 CFL draft. He played college football at Liberty Baptist College.

== Early life ==
Kearns was born in São Luís, Maranhão, Brazil and played soccer as a youth. His family moved back to Canada so Steve and his brother Dan could attend Wexford High school. They first played Canadian football in Grade 11.

== College career ==
Kearns played college football for the Liberty Baptist Flames of Liberty Baptist College from 1976 to 1979. He enrolled at Liberty as a defensive end but switched to tight end and wide receiver. He earned Churchmen’s second-team All-American honors in 1978. Kearns set school career records in receiving yards with 1,210 and touchdown receptions with 10. He was inducted into Liberty's athletics hall of fame in 2016.

== Professional career ==
Kearns was selected by the BC Lions as a territorial exemption in the 1980 CFL draft. He was the first Liberty player ever selected in a professional football draft. He played in 25 games for the Lions from 1980 to 1982. He was traded to the Hamilton Tiger-Cats and played in 30 games for the team from 1982 to 1985. Kearns retired after the 1985 season.

== Personal life ==
Kearns has worked as a chaplain for professional athletes with Athletes in Action after his playing career. He has been a chaplain for the Toronto Raptors, Hamilton Tiger-Cats, Toronto Argonauts and Toronto FC. His wife, Georgie, whom he met at Liberty Baptist College, has also worked with Athletes in Action.

Kearns' twin brother Dan also played in the CFL.
