= Dan Kearns =

Brazilian-Canadian gridiron football player (1956–2022)

No. 95
- Position: Defensive lineman

Personal information
- Born: November 23, 1956; São Luís, Maranhão, Brazil
- Died: February 28, 2022 (aged 65); Milton, Ontario, Canada
- Listed height: 6 ft 3 in (1.91 m)
- Listed weight: 240 lb (109 kg)

Career information
- High school: Wexford (Scarborough, Ontario)
- University: Simon Fraser
- CFL draft: 1980: 2nd round, 18th overall pick

Career history
- 1980–1988: Edmonton Eskimos
- 1989: Winnipeg Blue Bombers

Awards and highlights
- 4× Grey Cup champion (1980, 1981, 1982, 1987)

Dan Kearns (November 23, 1956 – February 28, 2022) was a Canadian professional football defensive lineman who played ten seasons in the Canadian Football League with the Edmonton Eskimos and Winnipeg Blue Bombers. He was drafted by the Edmonton Eskimos in the second round of the 1980 CFL draft. He played CIS football at Simon Fraser University and attended Wexford High school in Scarborough, Ontario. Dan's twin brother Steve also played in the CFL. Kearns died of pancreatic cancer in 2022.

== Early life ==
Kearns was born in São Luís, Maranhão, Brazil and played soccer as a youth. His family moved back to Canada so Dan and his brother Steve could attend Wexford High school. They first played Canadian football in Grade 11.

== College career ==
Kearns played CIS football for the Simon Fraser Clan.

== Professional career ==
Kearns was selected by the Edmonton Eskimos with the 18th pick in the 1980 CFL draft. He played for the Eskimos from 1980 to 1988, winning the Grey Cup four times.

Kearns played in four games for the Winnipeg Blue Bombers in 1989.
