= Shane Horton =

American gridiron football player (born 1988)

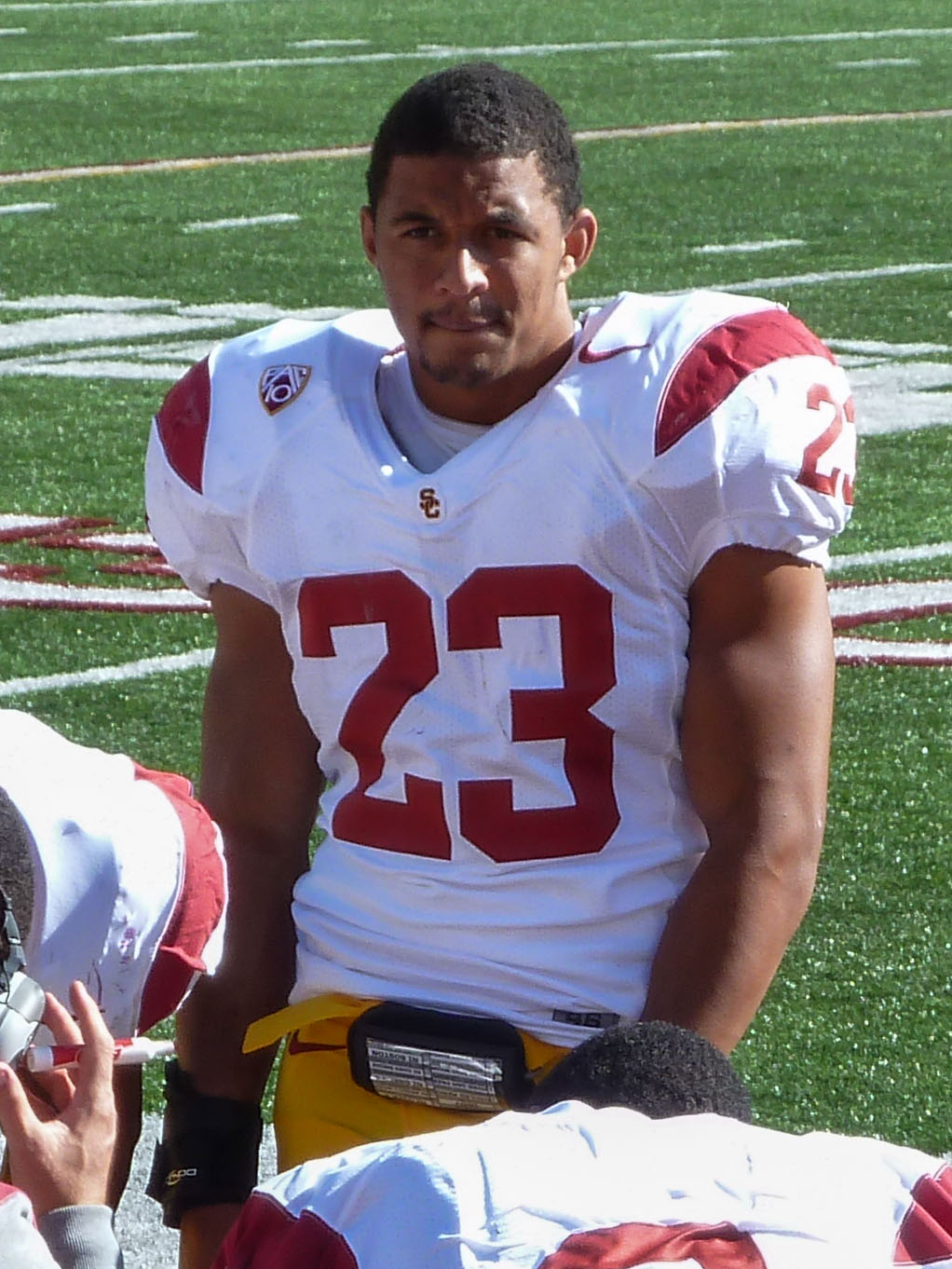

Profile
- Position: Linebacker

Personal information
- Born: July 25, 1988 (age 38); Los Angeles, California, U.S.
- Listed height: 6 ft 1 in (1.85 m)
- Listed weight: 215 lb (98 kg)

Career information
- High school: Notre Dame
- College: USC

Career history
- 2013–2014: Toronto Argonauts
- 2015: Edmonton Eskimos*
- * Offseason or practice squad member only
- Stats at CFL.ca

Shane Horton (born July 25, 1988) is an American former football linebacker. He played college football at USC. His brother is Wes Horton, a former defensive end for the Carolina Panthers.

== Early life ==
He attended Notre Dame High School in California. In the 2006 high school season, he was to the All-CIF Pac-5 Division first team and was selected to the Los Angeles Daily News All-Area first team. He also was named to the Super Prep All-Farwest, Prep Star All-West and the Cal-Hi Sports All-State third team.

== Professional career ==
=== Toronto Argonauts ===
On December 19, 2012, he signed with the Toronto Argonauts of the Canadian Football League as an undrafted free agent.

On October 3, 2014, Horton was released by the Argonauts.

== Personal ==
Shane's father is Michael (Myke) Horton, former UCLA offensive lineman who played nine years as a backup on various NFL, CFL and USFL teams before becoming nationally known as "Gemini", one of the original American Gladiators (1989–1992). His brother, Wes Horton, is an American football defensive end who played college football at USC and professionally in the NFL for the Carolina Panthers and the New Orleans Saints.
