= Wes Horton =

American football player (born 1990)

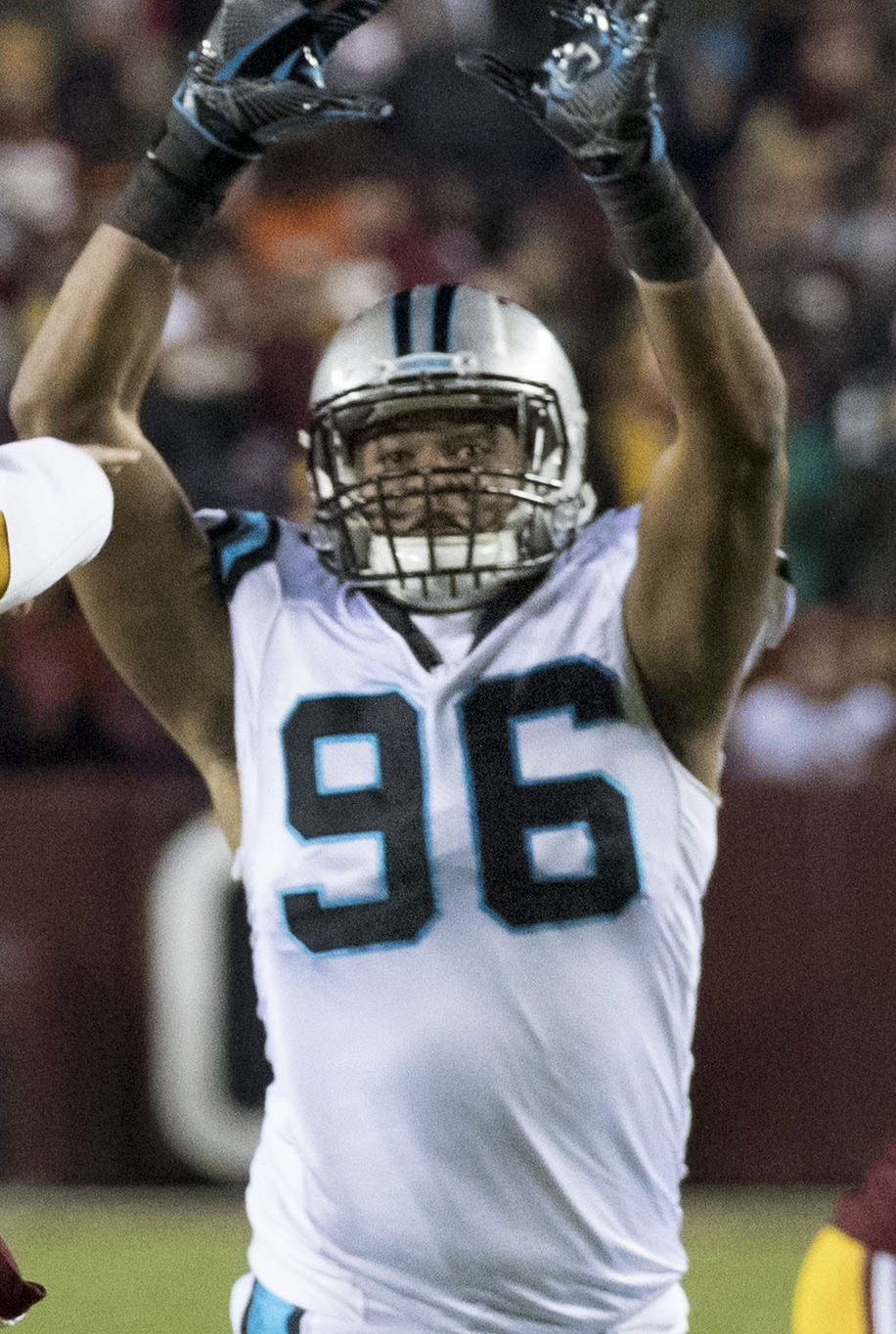
- Horton with the Carolina Panthers

No. 96, 50
- Position: Defensive end

Personal information
- Born: January 18, 1990 (age 36); Chatsworth, California, U.S.
- Listed height: 6 ft 5 in (1.96 m)
- Listed weight: 265 lb (120 kg)

Career information
- High school: Notre Dame (Sherman Oaks, California)
- College: USC
- NFL draft: 2013: undrafted

Career history
- Carolina Panthers (2013–2018); New Orleans Saints (2019); Carolina Panthers (2019)

Awards and highlights
- Second-team All-Pac-12 (2011)

Career NFL statistics
- Total tackles: 97
- Sacks: 15.5
- Forced fumbles: 6
- Fumble recoveries: 2
- Stats at Pro Football Reference

Wes Chandler Horton (born January 18, 1990) is an American former professional football player who was a defensive end in the National Football League (NFL). He played college football for the USC Trojans. He is the brother of former Toronto Argonauts linebacker Shane Horton. He was signed by the Carolina Panthers as an undrafted free agent in 2013 and spent the bulk of his seven NFL seasons with the team.

== Early life ==
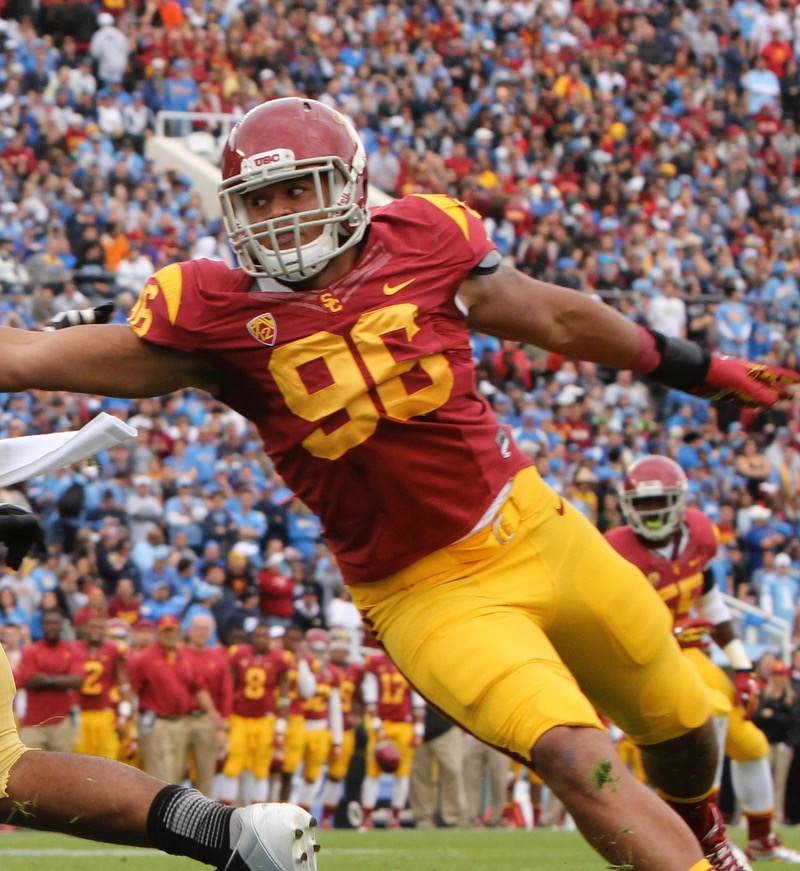
Horton playing at USC in 2012.

Horton was born and raised in Los Angeles, California. He attended Notre Dame High School. As a junior, he was selected to the Cal-Hi Sports All-State Underclass second-team and also was named to Los Angeles Daily News All-Area first-team and All-Serra League first-team. As a senior, he was selected to the Prep Star All-American, Super Prep All-Farwest, Prep Star All-West teams. He also was selected to the All-CIF Pac-5 Division first-team and Los Angeles Daily News All-Area second-team.

== Professional career ==
=== Carolina Panthers ===
On April 28, 2013, he signed with the Carolina Panthers as an undrafted free agent. In his rookie season, Horton played in 10 games and recorded eight tackles and two sacks.

On November 23, 2015, Horton was suspended for four games by the National Football League for violating the NFL Performance Enhancement Drug Policy after testing positive for a performance-enhancing substance. On December 28, 2015, the Carolina Panthers waived Horton.

On February 7, 2016, Horton's Panthers played in Super Bowl 50. In the game, the Panthers fell to the Denver Broncos by a score of 24–10.

Horton re-signed with the Panthers on a one-year deal on February 16, 2016. On September 4, 2016, Horton was released by the Panthers. He was re-signed by the team on October 14, 2016.

On February 27, 2017, Horton signed a two-year contract extension with the Panthers through the 2018 season.

=== New Orleans Saints ===
On May 21, 2019, Horton signed with the New Orleans Saints. He was released on September 9, 2019.

=== Carolina Panthers (second stint) ===
On November 6, 2019, Horton signed with the Carolina Panthers.

Horton retired on February 4, 2020, citing a desire to preserve his health and mentor younger athletes at the high school level.

== Personal life ==
Wes Horton's father is Myke Horton, former UCLA offensive lineman who played nine years as a backup on various NFL, CFL, and USFL teams before becoming nationally known as "Gemini", one of the original American Gladiators (1989–1992). His brother, Shane Horton, is an American football linebacker who played college football at USC and professionally in the CFL for the Toronto Argonauts.
