= Dalton Smarsh =

Canadian football player (born c.1950)

Profile
- Position: Running back

Personal information
- Born: 1949 or 1950 (age 75–76); Edmonton, Alberta, Canada

Career information
- University: Alberta
- CFL draft: 1975: 7th round, 61st overall pick

Career history

Playing
- 1972–1976: Alberta Golden Bears

Coaching
- 1980s: Edmonton Wildcats
- 1985: Alberta Golden Bears (OC)
- 2007–2009: Edmonton Huskies

Awards and highlights
- Vanier Cup championship (1972)

Dalton Smarsh (born c. 1950) is a Canadian former football player. He is known for his playing career at the University of Alberta, where he is described as "one of the most outstanding running backs in the history of Golden Bear football".

Smarsh played for the Alberta Golden Bears football team as a running back from 1972 to 1976. In 1972 the Bears won the CIAU Championship, and in 1974, he was a member of the CIAU All-Canadian team. Smarsh was also captain of the Golden Bears football team for four seasons and set many CIAU records. He graduated from the university with a Bachelor of Education degree. Though was selected in the 1976 CFL draft by the Saskatchewan Roughriders in the 7th round, 61st overall, Smarsh decided to pursue a career in education, and worked for Edmonton Public Schools where was a physical education teacher, also coaching high school sports. He retired around 2007 from teaching. Smarsh has also served as offensive coordinator of the Golden Bears (1985) and as a coach of the Edmonton Wildcats. He won a championship with the Wildcats in 1983 and won the coach of the year award that same season. In 2001, he was inducted into the University of Alberta's Sports Wall of Fame. Smarsh was named head coach of the Edmonton Huskies in November 2007; he would serve in that capacity until he was let go in September 2009.
