= Vernon Pahl =

Canadian football player (born 1957)

No. 54, 74
- Position: Linebacker

Personal information
- Born: February 19, 1957 (age 69); Montreal, Quebec, Canada
- Listed height: 6 ft 2 in (1.88 m)
- Listed weight: 200 lb (91 kg)

Career information
- University: UPEI
- CFL draft: 1980: 3rd round, 21st overall pick

Career history
- 1980–1988: Winnipeg Blue Bombers

Awards and highlights
- 2× Grey Cup champion (1984, 1988)

Vernon Pahl (born February 19, 1957) is a Canadian former professional football player who played nine seasons with the Winnipeg Blue Bombers of the Canadian Football League (CFL). He was selected by the Blue Bombers in the third round of the 1980 CFL draft after playing CIAU football at the University of Prince Edward Island.

== Early life ==
Vernon Pahl was born on February 19, 1957, in Montreal, Quebec. He played college football for the UPEI Panthers of the University of Prince Edward Island. He was originally an offensive guard in college before moving to defense for his senior season. Pahl was inducted into the UPEI Sports Hall of Fame in 2019.

== Professional career ==
Pahl was selected by the Winnipeg Blue Bombers in the third round, with the 21st overall pick, of the 1980 CFL draft. He played in 146 games for the Blue Bombers from 1980 to 1988, totaling 20 sacks, five interceptions, nine receptions for 93 yards, eight carries for 25 yards, and six kickoff returns for 60 yards. The Blue Bombers won the 72nd Grey Cup in 1984 and the 76th Grey Cup in 1988. Pahl retired on June 13, 1989.

== Personal life ==
Pahl was a sailor for five years after his CFL career. He then graduated from the University of Calgary with a law degree and became a civil litigation lawyer.
