= Peter Crepin =

Canadian football player

Profile
- Position: Defensive back

Personal information
- Born: November 5, 1952 (age 74); Ottawa, Ontario, Canada
- Listed height: 6 ft 0 in (1.83 m)
- Listed weight: 180 lb (82 kg)

Career history
- 1974–1980: Ottawa Rough Riders
- 1981: Winnipeg Blue Bombers

Awards and highlights
- Grey Cup champion (1976)

Peter Crepin (born November 5, 1952) is a retired Canadian football player who played for the Ottawa Rough Riders and Winnipeg Blue Bombers of the Canadian Football League (CFL). He played junior football for the Ottawa Sooners.
