= William Henry McGuire =

Canadian politician

William Henry McGuire (May 31, 1873 – October 31, 1957) was a Canadian senator who represented East York for 30 years.

== Biography ==
=== Early life and education ===
William Henry McGuire was born May 31, 1873, on a family farm near Peterborough, Ontario, one of the 14 children of John and Ellen McGuire of Seymour Township. He attended high school in Campbellford, Ontario, and was assisted in attaining higher education by an older brother, Father Michael McGuire, who was a Roman Catholic priest in the area. William "Billy" McGuire graduated from the University of Toronto in 1903 and studied law at Osgoode Hall.

=== Career ===
He practiced as a lawyer first in Niagara Falls, and then in Toronto, and was a member of the Liberal Party of Canada. He was named to the Senate of Canada by Prime Minister William Lyon Mackenzie King on December 20, 1926 and served East York until his death on October 31, 1957, an impressive total of 30 years, 10 months and 12 days.

Senator McGuire was influential in the Irish-Canadian/Roman Catholic communities. He and Senator Frank Patrick O'Connor (Scarborough Junction) acquired a vacant church in the village of Wexford (Lawrence Avenue East, east of Victoria Park Avenue, now in the Scarborough area of Toronto) to establish Precious Blood parish. Due to its once-vacant state, the original red brick church, even after its rejuvenation, was known for many years as "the pigeon church."

Senator McGuire also owned a farm with an English garden named "Belmore" across Lawrence Avenue from the church and, although the area is now entirely urban and Wexford Collegiate Institute occupies the site of his home, many of the mature trees in the area were planted by him.

=== Marriage and children ===
William Henry McGuire married Anna McNevin (1881–1954) in 1911 and had one daughter, Mary Aileen (1913–1959), who also became a lawyer. He was father-in-law to James Worrall, lawyer, international track and field athlete, and International Olympic Committee representative to Canada.
