= Jordan Case =

American football player

Profile
- Position: Quarterback

Personal information
- Born: January 6, 1957 (age 69)

Career information
- College: North Texas

Career history
- 1980–1982: Ottawa Rough Riders

Jordan Case (born January 6, 1957) is a former Canadian football quarterback in the Canadian Football League (CFL) who played for the Ottawa Rough Riders. He played college football for the North Texas Mean Green. In 2001, Case was inducted into the North Texas Athletics Hall of Fame.
