= Mark Nelson (Canadian football) =

Canadian gridiron football player and coach (born 1956)

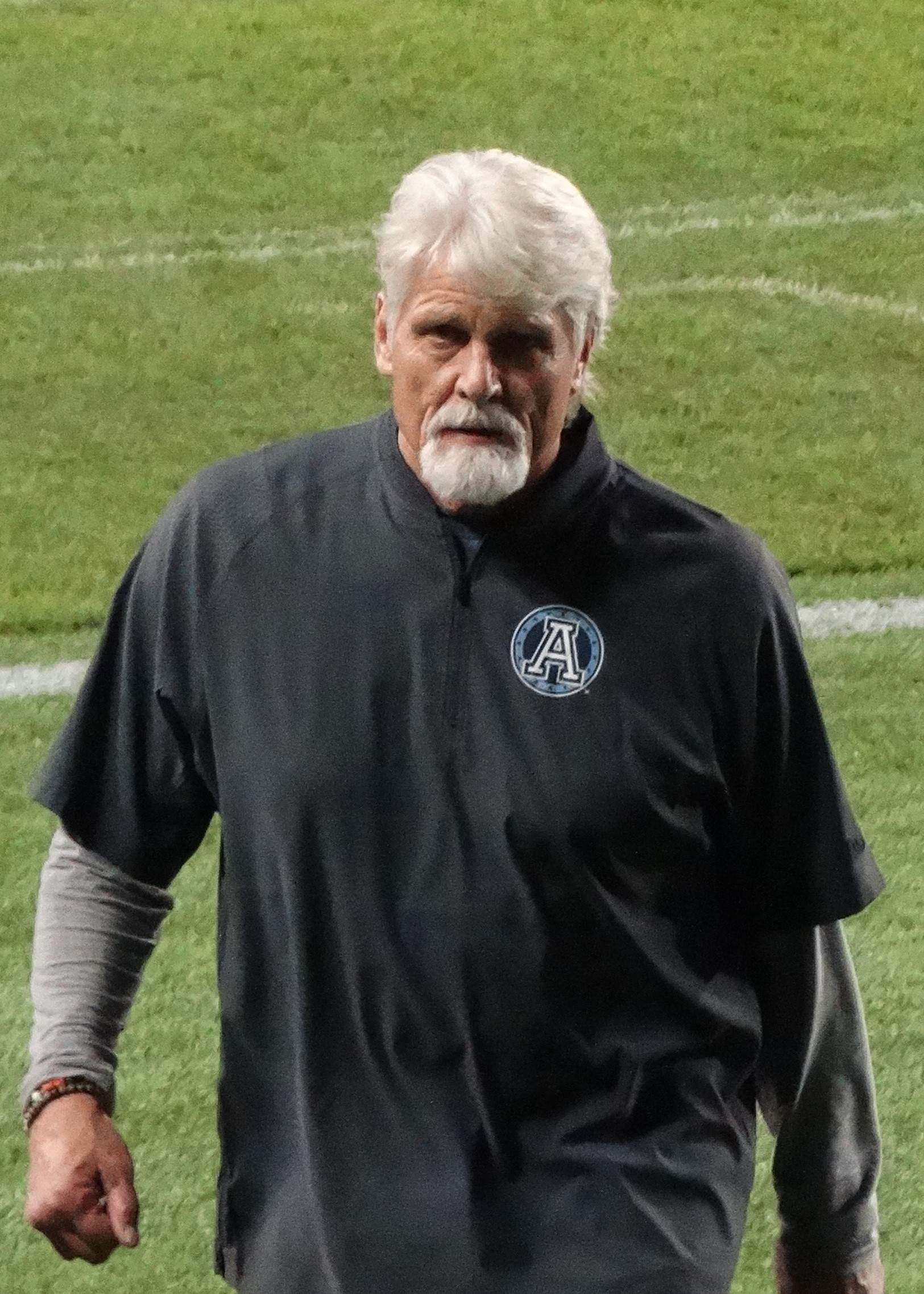
- Nelson with the Toronto Argonauts in 2021

Saint Mary's Huskies
- Title: Special teams coordinator, linebackers coach

Personal information
- Born: July 25, 1956 (age 70); Edmonton, Alberta, Canada
- Listed height: 6 ft 2 in (1.88 m)
- Listed weight: 220 lb (100 kg)

Career information
- Position: Linebacker
- College: East Central Oklahoma State
- CFL draft: 1980: Terr. Exemptionth round

Career history

Playing
- 1980–1985: Calgary Stampeders
- 1986: Saskatchewan Roughriders

Coaching
- 1992: Edmonton Eskimos (ST coach/LB coach)
- 1993–1994: Edmonton Eskimos (ST coach/RB coach)
- 1995: San Antonio Texans (LB coach)
- 1996: Toronto Argonauts (DL coach)
- 1997–1999: Valdosta State Blazers (DC/LB coach)
- 2000: Arkansas Tech Wonder Boys (DC/DB coach)
- 2001: Kentucky Wildcats (ST coach/TE coach)
- 2002: Kentucky Wildcats (ST coach/DL coach)
- 2003: Baylor Bears (ST coach/DL coach)
- 2004–2005: Baylor Bears (ST coach/LB coach)
- 2006: Tulsa Golden Hurricane (ST coach/DL coach)
- 2007: Louisville Cardinals (ST coach/DL coach)
- 2008: Louisville Cardinals (ST coach)
- 2009: Winnipeg Blue Bombers (DC/LB coach)
- 2010–2011: Edmonton Eskimos (LB coach)
- 2012: Edmonton Eskimos (DC/LB coach)
- 2013: Montreal Alouettes (LB coach)
- 2014–2017: Ottawa Redblacks (DC/LB coach)
- 2018–2019: Ottawa Redblacks (LB coach)
- 2020–2021: Toronto Argonauts (STC)
- 2022: Carleton Ravens (STC/LB coach)
- 2023–present: Saint Mary's Huskies (STC/LB coach)

Awards and highlights
- 3× Grey Cup champion (1993, 1996, 2016)

Mark Nelson (born July 25, 1956) is a Canadian football coach and former linebacker. He is the special teams coordinator and linebackers coach for the Saint Mary's Huskies of U Sports. He played for seven seasons in the Canadian Football League (CFL) for the Calgary Stampeders and Saskatchewan Roughriders. He is a three-time Grey Cup champion having won as a coach in 1993, 1996 and 2016.

== Playing career ==
Nelson played college football for the East Central Oklahoma State Tigers. Nelson was drafted in the 1980 CFL draft by the Calgary Stampeders where he played for seven years before retiring with the Saskatchewan Roughriders in 1987. Nelson played linebacker and fullback during his CFL run.

== Coaching career ==
Nelson has coached for 16 different teams. More recently, on December 20, 2013, he was named the Ottawa Redblacks' defensive coordinator. In 2018, he was demoted from defensive coordinator for the Redblacks to their linebackers coach.

On February 6, 2020, it was announced that Nelson had joined the Toronto Argonauts as the team's special teams coordinator. The league did not play in 2020, so he coached for one season with the Argonauts in 2021. He was not retained by the team for the 2022 season.

On June 23, 2022, it was announced that Nelson had joined the Carleton Ravens to serve as the team's special teams coordinator and linebackers coach. After one season with the Ravens, he joined the Saint Mary's Huskies coaching staff as the team's special teams coordinator and linebackers coach.

== Personal life ==
Nelson's father, Roger is on the Edmonton Eskimo's Wall of Honour and was inducted into the Canadian Football Hall of Fame. His son, Kyle was a long snapper for the San Francisco 49ers.
