= Phil Jones (Canadian football) =

Canadian football player (born 1956)

No. 12, 6, 1, 24
- Position: Defensive back

Personal information
- Born: June 11, 1956 (age 70); Scarborough, Ontario, Canada
- Listed height: 6 ft 0 in (1.83 m)
- Listed weight: 190 lb (86 kg)

Career information
- High school: R.H. King (Scarborough)
- University: Simon Fraser

Career history
- Toronto Argonauts (1980–1981); Montreal Concordes (1982–1985); Ottawa Rough Riders (1986); Edmonton Eskimos (1986)

Awards and highlights
- CFL East All-Star (1984)

Philip Jones (born June 11, 1956) is a Canadian former professional football defensive back who played seven seasons in the Canadian Football League (CFL) with the Toronto Argonauts, Montreal Concordes, Ottawa Rough Riders, and Edmonton Eskimos. He played CIAU football at Simon Fraser University.

== Early life ==
Philip Jones was born on June 11, 1956, in Scarborough, Ontario. He attended high school at R.H. King Collegiate in Scarborough, and was named the athlete-of-the-year during his graduating year of 1975. He also played three seasons of junior football with the Scarborough Rams of the Ontario Football Conference (OFC). Jones was named the OFC's MVP and best defensive back during his final season in 1976.

Jones then played three years of CIAU football for the Simon Fraser Clan of Simon Fraser University from 1977 to 1979. In 1978, he set the school's single-season punting average record with 38.2 yards per punt and the single-game average with 42.8. In 1979, he recorded 30 solo tackles, 26 assisted tackles, one forced fumble, two fumble recoveries, and 47 punts for 1,722 yards (36.6 average). Jones majored in business and commerce at Simor Fraser.

== Professional career ==
Jones was a territorial protection of the Toronto Argonauts in the 1980 CFL draft. He dressed in all 32 games for the Argonauts from 1980 to 1981. He missed most of training camp in 1982 after suffering an Achilles tendon injury on the second day of camp.

On July 2, 1982, Jones was traded to the Montreal Concordes for future considerations. He was named a CFL East All-Star in 1984. He dressed in 51 games overall during his time in Montreal from 1982 to 1985, and was the starting free safety from 1983 to 1985.

On February 26, 1986, Jones was traded to the Ottawa Rough Riders for future considerations. Jones expressed shock at only being traded for future considerations, stating "I just bought a house in Montreal last year" and "I think I was coming off my best season." He also said he had two mid-term college exams at the time of the trade and was so rattled he flunked both of them. He dressed in seven games for the Rough Riders in 1986. Ottawa head coach Joe Moss had reportedly suspected Jones of feigning injury and/or pampering himself. On August 31, a day before his contract for the 1986 season became guaranteed, Jones was released by the Rough Riders. As a result of this, Jones said "There's been a grievance lodged because, in fact, I really was hurt.

Jones then signed with the Edmonton Eskimos after an injury to Laurent DesLauriers. Jones played in six games for Edmonton during the 1986 season and was the starting rover back in the 74th Grey Cup, a 39–15 loss to the Hamilton Tiger-Cats. In May 1987, it was reported that Jones had retired. He finished his CFL career with totals of 96 games dressed, 20 interceptions for 188 yards, three sacks, three fumble recoveries, 112 punt returns for 948 yards and one touchdown, 20 kickoff returns for 459 yards, and one punt for 46 yards.

== Post-football career ==
After his football career, Jones became the president and CEO of Dynavision International LLC. He designed and marketed the Dynavision D1 cognitive training device in 1989. The company later released a second model known as the Dynavision D2. During the 2010s, Dynavision became a distributor of the CoreControl Cooling Glove, which cools down body temperature during exercise or sport.
