= Gerry McGrath =

Profile
- Positions: Kicker, Punter

Personal information
- Born: June 14, 1959 (age 67); Montreal, Quebec, Canada
- Listed height: 5 ft 10 in (1.78 m)
- Listed weight: 195 lb (88 kg)

Career information
- CJFL: Verdun Maple Leafs

Career history

Playing
- 1980–1981: Montreal Alouettes
- 1982: Ottawa Rough Riders*
- 1983–1984: Montreal Concordes
- 1985–1986: Saskatchewan Roughriders
- * Offseason or practice squad member only

Coaching
- 1992–1999: Concordia Stingers (OC)
- 2000–2013: Concordia Stingers (HC)

Gerry McGrath (born June 14, 1959) is a Canadian former professional football placekicker and punter and former head coach for Concordia University's football team, the Concordia Stingers. McGrath became Concordia's head coach in 2000 after serving for eight years as the team's offensive coordinator. As a professional player, he played for six seasons for the Montreal Alouettes, Montreal Concordes, and Saskatchewan Roughriders of the Canadian Football League. He played junior football for the Verdun Maple Leafs of the Canadian Junior Football League.
