= Wexford Collegiate School for the Arts =

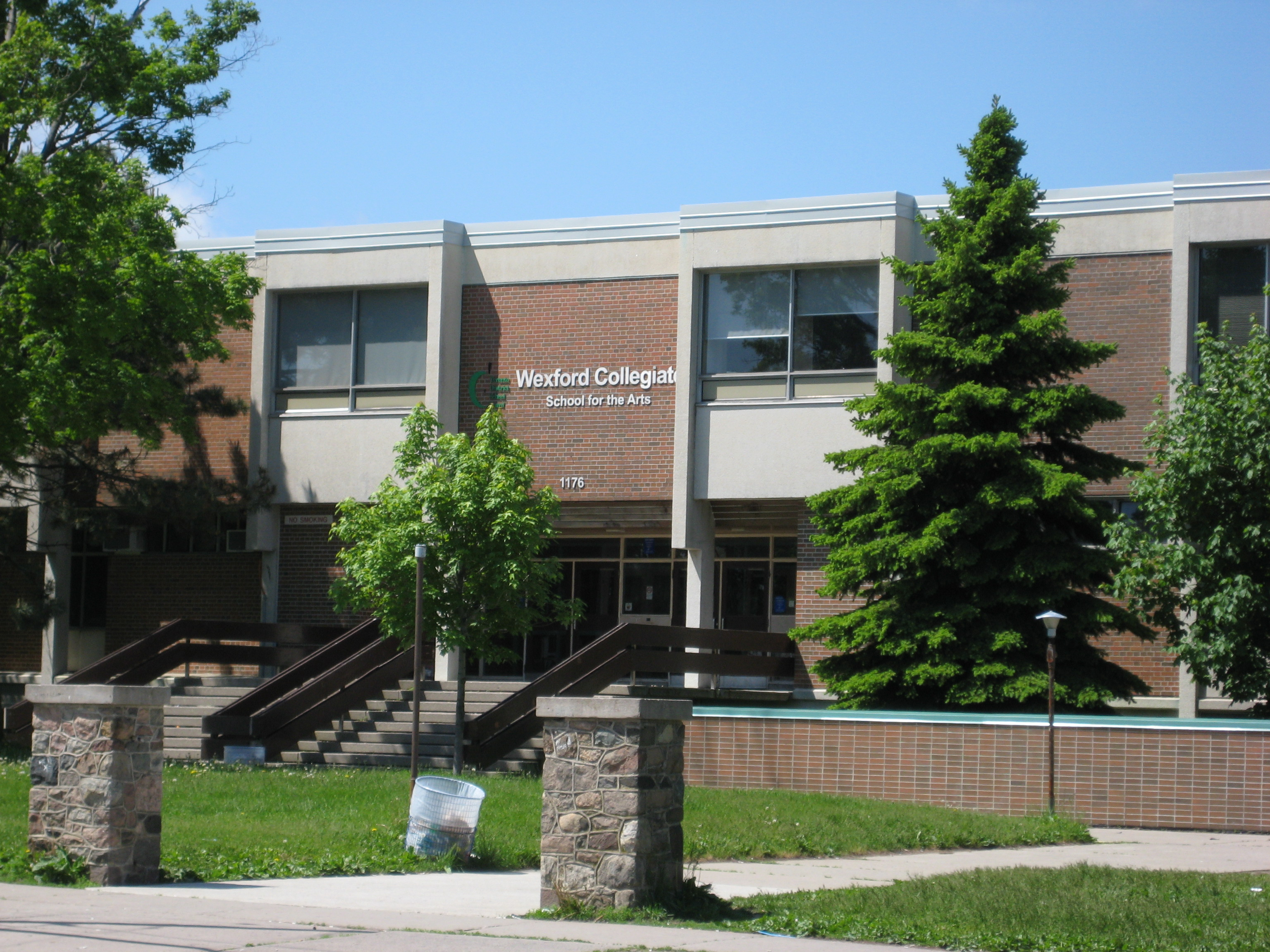
- Wexford C.I. built in 1965, pictured in 2009.

Location
- 1176 Pharmacy Avenue; Wexford, Toronto, Ontario, M1R 2H7; Canada; 43.745972°N 79.306601°W

Information
- Former name: Wexford Collegiate Institute (1965–2006)
- School type: Public high school
- Motto: Palman Qui Meruit Ferat (Let him bear the palm who has deserved it)
- Founded: 1965
- School board: Toronto District School Board (Scarborough Board of Education)
- Superintendent: Lynn Strangway; LC3, Executive; Liz Holder; LN18
- Area trustee: Neethan Shan; Ward 17
- School number: 4190 / 952990
- Principal: Bernadette Shaw (acting)
- Grades: 9–12
- Enrolment: 1051 (2021–22)
- Language: English
- Colours: Green, lime green and White
- Mascot: Harry The Viking
- Team name: Wexford Vikings
- Newspaper: Wexford Student-Run Newspaper
- Website: wexfordcsa.ca

Wexford Collegiate School for the Arts (commonly known as Wexford Collegiate, WCSA, Wexford CSA, Wexford or "Wex" for short), formerly and still known as Wexford Collegiate Institute (WCI) (initially known as Northwest Collegiate Institute) is a public high school in Toronto, Ontario, Canada. Located in the former suburb of Scarborough, it is run and organized by the Toronto District School Board. The school officially opened to students in September 1965 by the Scarborough Board of Education. It was renamed Wexford Collegiate School for the Arts in 2006 in recognition of its specialized arts programs.

The school is located in the Wexford neighborhood of Scarborough, north of the intersection of Lawrence Avenue and Pharmacy Avenue. The motto for the school is Palman Qui Meruit Ferat which means "Let him bear the palm who has deserved it".

== History ==
Located on Pharmacy Avenue in Scarborough, Wexford is a mid-sized, three storey secondary school. The origins began when the Scarborough Board of Education applied for accommodation for a 1200 pupil secondary school named Northwest Collegiate Institute on April 2, 1962 and took steps to acquire the 8.59 acre farm owned by the late William Henry McGuire. Meanwhile, the Board offered $200,000 to James Worrall (McGuire's son-in-law) who later accepted it.

Page & Steele was appointed architects for the Northwest C.I. project and the contract for removal of buildings on the McGuire site was awarded for $1800.

On March 18, 1963, Northwest C.I. was given the official name, Wexford Collegiate Institute. The next month, the contract for construction of school awarded to Noren Construction for $1,870,220.18 with the application for funds for $2,232,000.00. The board appointed Lorne Shewfelt as the principal and Al Kerr in the Vice Principal position effective September 1, 1964. Work began on the Wexford school on July 2, 1964.

Wexford Collegiate opened for classes on September 7, 1965 as Scarborough's thirteenth collegiate institute only with the classrooms that were completed which on the upper floors. Other rooms such as home economics, industrial arts, science labs, music rooms, gymnasia, library and cafeteria are eventually completed and become available for use. The school officially opened on February 4, 1966 and the datestone ("1964") officially inserted into position in the front foyer on April 1 of that year.

In 1972 a large new wing was built in the north parking lot and opened at the north end of the school, which housed the new Art Centre, as well as a new gym and library. The new wing also included an elevator, making it one of the accessible schools within the TDSB system. By 1977, the 25 metre tank swimming pool was added.

Along with instructing the regular, core program leading to an OSSD, the school also consists of two art programs, known as the Performing Arts program and the Visual Arts program. Each program is further divided into more pathways, which is distinguished through the courses taken by the student. The encouraged growth of the Music Theatre Program in the 1990s and the continuing success of the Art Centre resulted in the declaration of the school as Wexford Collegiate School For The Arts in 2006.

== Admissions ==
For students that geographically reside in Wexford's catchment area, the general TDSB admission policies apply for the regular academic program. Feeder elementary schools include Maryvale Public School, Buchanan Public School, George Peck Public school and Wexford Public School. Students, including local community students, wishing to enroll in one of the two Specialized Arts Programs must successfully participate in an audition process in order to be offered a position in one of these Programs.

In May 2022, the Student Interest Programs Policy was approved by the TDSB Board of Trustees following "extensive consultation and feedback from students, parents/guardians, staff, and the broader community, as well as a review of best practices, system data, and TDSB enrolment trends." The purpose of the new policy is to "improve access and remove long-standing barriers" to specialized programs in TDSB secondary schools. Per the new policy, auditions, formal portfolios, entrance exams, and report card marks will no longer be used to select and accept applicants to specialized programs in TDSB secondary schools such as the Performing or Visual Arts programs at WCSA. Instead, students will be required to demonstrate "an interest or passion" in their chosen area of study. If interest exceeds available spaces, a "Random Selection Process" will be used.

The policy was approved by the Board of Trustees on May 25, 2022 and the new, centralized application process was in place as of September 2022.

== Programs ==
=== Visual and Media Arts Program ===
Wexford has had a specialized Visual Arts Program for over forty years. All visual arts courses taken at the school are done in one of the classrooms located in The Art Centre. The Art Centre consists of nine studios, each specifically equipped to deliver a specialized course. One of these courses is the Life Drawing course, for which Wexford is the only secondary public school in Toronto offering the course.

For students in the Special Series and Media Arts Program (more commonly known as the "Visual Arts program"), a choice can be made at the end of grade ten where students can either earn the Grand Masters Certificate or the Visual Arts Certificate. For students earning the Grand Masters Certificate, they must take four art credits in both grade eleven and twelve, meaning half of their schedule consists of art credits. For students wishing for the Visual Arts Certificate, they must take 2 art credits in both grade eleven in twelve.

For students who have graduated from Wexford but would like to construct a portfolio as a part of their college, university or career application, they can apply for the Portfolio Year, where they will spend half to a full year constructing their portfolio with the assistance of the art teachers.

Each year, the Special Series Visual Art Program staff and students put on an original exhibit known as, The Great Masters Art Show. It typically takes place during the month of May, and is open to the public free of admission.

=== Performing Arts ===
If accepted after participating in the audition process, students will be placed either in the Music Theatre program or the Drama Focus program.

==== Music Theatre ====
Music Theatre students will take a Music Theatre course as well as a course either in Drama, Vocal or Dance, depending on where they are placed.

The Music Theatre program holds strong ties to the film, television and theatre community in Toronto. Workshops are frequently conducted between these artists and students.

These ties to the professional community have also given professional opportunities to some Wexford students in film, television, musical theatre and radio jingles. In the 1990s, Wexford established a great relationship between the Music Theatre students and the Hospital for Sick Children's Telethon produced by CFTO. The students were invited back for a seventh year in 1997. In 1993 they had four "spots" on the telethon, including the final number which they shared with Colm Wilkinson (The Phantom) and Michael Burgess (Les Miz, Man of La Mancha). The Music Theatre students also performed in a video with Donny Osmond (Joseph and the Amazing Technicolor Dream Coat) and in 1994 shared the stage with Michael Bell (Show Boat).

In addition, the students have performed live both on CBC and CTV networks; live on stage at the New Yorker Theatre; recorded the original song "Keep the Spirit Alive" for the special Olympics; performed at the Celebrity Sports Auction; performed with Robert Pilon at Casa Loma for CEO's from all over the world; performed along with the Leahy's and Andre Philipe Gagnon; entertained 5,000 representatives from all over North America at the Metro Convention Centre; and, appeared along with the cast of Rent at Mel and Marilyn Lastman's Inaugural Ball. In 2011, the Wexford Glee Club, known as "The Wexford Gleeks" won the first ever Show Choir Canada National Championship. In 2012, the Wexford Gleeks placed second in the SCC Nationals, but were the audience favorite as the only choir to receive two standing ovations during the competition. In 2013, the Wexford Gleeks placed 2nd once again in the SCC Nationals, but won eight out of the ten awards that were given to individual choirs and choir members. In February 2013, the Wexford Gleeks recorded a song with an extraterrestrial Chris Hadfield and Ed Robertson of the Barenaked Ladies. Hadfield, astronaut and amateur musician, was circling the earth on the International Space Station at the time of the recording.

At the end of each school year, a musical is put together by the students and staff of the Music Theatre program.

==== Drama Focus ====
Drama Focus students will take a course of their choice either in Vocal, Dance or in Instruments in addition to their required Drama Course. Drama Focus students and staff put together a showcase in the Fall during each school year.

=== Comprehensive Arts ===
In addition to the Performing and Visual Arts programs, students who have gone through either audition process may be placed in the Comprehensive Arts program. This program allows students to take two, as opposed to one, art credit beginning in grade nine. These credits, however, are not specialized credits like those found in the Performing and Visual Arts programs. These credits are regular credits taken by students who attend the school but are not a part of either programs.

== Incident ==
On September 16, 2025, the Toronto Police Service responded to a call regarding someone with a firearm. The school was placed into lockdown. No injuries were reported.

== Notable alumni ==
- Kawa Ada — actor and playwright
- Shamier Anderson — actor, Wynonna Earp (TV series)
- Shary Boyle — visual artist, represented Canada at the 2013 Venice Biennale
- Wayne Dillon — former National Hockey League player
- Nina Dobrev — actress, Vampire Diaries
- Fefe Dobson — Juno Award-nominated recording artist.
- Filip Geljo — actor, Avatar: The Way of Water.
- Jahmil French — actor, Degrassi: the Next Generation.
- Sheriauna Haase — actor, dancer, and para-athletics athlete
- Warren Hudson — retired CFL player
- Lamar Johnson — actor
- Dan Kearns — retired CFL player
- Steve Kearns — retired CFL player
- Jamaal Magloire — retired NBA player (Grades 9 and 10 only, graduated from Eastern Commerce Collegiate Institute)
- Corteon Moore — actor
- Kristine Sa — singer/songwriter
- Rajiv Surendra — visual artist and actor, Mean Girls.
- Brent Townsend — wildlife artist, designer of the Royal Canadian Mint's "Toonie".
- Torri Webster — actress, Life with Boys

== See also ==
- Education in Ontario
- List of secondary schools in Ontario
