= 1976 CFL draft =

Canadian football draft

The 1976 CFL draft composed of 10 rounds where 106 Canadian football players were chosen from eligible Canadian universities and Canadian players playing in the NCAA. A total of 18 players were selected as territorial exemptions, with the Calgary Stampeders being the only team to make no picks during this stage of the draft. Through a trade with the Toronto Argonauts, the Edmonton Eskimos selected first overall in the draft. The Eskimos had four total picks in the first round of the draft alone.

== Territorial exemptions ==
Toronto Argonauts Neil Lumsden TB Ottawa

Toronto Argonauts Steve Telfer TE Saint Mary's

Toronto Argonauts Vic Wasilenko DB British Columbia

British Columbia Lions Bill Norton DT Weber State

British Columbia Lions Glen Jackson LB Simon Fraser

British Columbia Lions Mitch Davies E Calgary

Hamilton Tiger-Cats Bill Harrison TB Ottawa

Hamilton Tiger-Cats John Kelley DB Guelph

Winnipeg Blue Bombers Ted Milian G Manitoba

Winnipeg Blue Bombers Rick Koswin WR Manitoba

Ottawa Rough Riders Jeff Avery WR Ottawa

Ottawa Rough Riders John Palazeti TB Richmond

Saskatchewan Roughriders Ron Cherkas DT University of Utah

Saskatchewan Roughriders Brian O'Hara TB Whitworth

Montreal Alouettes Yvon Thibeault T McGill

Montreal Alouettes Rodney Ward LB Bishop's

Edmonton Eskimos Brian Fryer WR Alberta

Edmonton Eskimos Walter Bauer TE Drake

== 1st round ==
= CFL Division All-Star	= CFL All-Star	= Hall of Famer

Pick #	CFL team	Player	Position	College
1	Edmonton Eskimos	Tim Berryman	LB	Ottawa
2	BC Lions	Randy Graham	DB	Simon Fraser
3	Edmonton Eskimos	Alan Moffat	DT	Ottawa
4	Ottawa Rough Riders	Steve Gelley	DB	Simon Fraser
5	BC Lions	Lui Passaglia	K	Simon Fraser
6	Ottawa Rough Riders	Bill Hatanaka	WR	York
7	Saskatchewan Roughriders	Tim Pickett	DB	Waterloo
8	Edmonton Eskimos	Tom Kudaba	G	Simon Fraser
9	Edmonton Eskimos	Ian MacPherson	DE	Ottawa

== 2nd round ==
10. British Columbia Lions Len Platt WR Tulsa

11. British Columbia Lions John Turecki DE British Columbia

12. Calgary Stampeders Jay Parry WR Western Ontario

13. Hamilton Tiger-Cats Barry Cozack TB Mount Allison

14. Winnipeg Blue Bombers Gordon Taylor QB Wilfrid Laurier

15. Edmonton Eskimos Steve Andryjowicz TB Toronto

16. Saskatchewan Roughriders Bog Gibbons DT Saskatchewan

17. Winnipeg Blue Bombers Ron Mironuck LB Whitworth

18. Edmonton Eskimos Eric Upton G Ottawa

== 3rd round ==
19. Toronto Argonauts Rodney Allison LB Saint Mary's

20. British Columbia Lions Dale Parkhouse TE Western Ontario

21. Calgary Stampeders Dave McMillan WR Concordia

22. Hamilton Tiger-Cats Paul Whaley DB Guelph

23. Winnipeg Blue Bombers Tim Maltre WR Memphis State

24. Montreal Alouettes Charles McMann TB Wilfrid Laurier

25. Saskatchewan Roughriders John Glassford LB Wilfrid Laurier

26. Montreal Alouettes Errol Moen DT Alberta

27. Edmonton Eskimos Darrell Penner DB Queen's

== 4th round ==
28. Toronto Argonauts Brian Utley TE Saskatchewan

29. British Columbia Lions Gerald Inglis LB Alberta

30. Calgaray Stampeders Richard Haswell FB Wilfrid Laurier

31. Hamilton Tiger-Cats Paul Genovese G McMaster

32. Winnipeg Blue Bombers Henry Booy E British Columbia

33. Ottawa Rough Riders Drew Allan G Carleton

34. Saskatchewan Roughriders Terry West DB Ottawa

35. Montreal Alouettes Glen Leach DB Wilfrid Laurier

36. Edmonton Eskimos Rick Scarborough TB Western Ontario

== 5th round ==
37. Toronto Argonauts Bob Palmer TB York

38. British Columbia Lions Jim Cimba DB Western Ontario

39. Calgary Stampeders Larry Titley LB Concordia

40. Hamilton Tiger-Cats Rick Slipetz LB York

41. Winnipeg Blue Bombers Wayne Churchill DE Windsor

42. Ottawa Rough Riders Doug Kitts QB York

43. Saskatchewan Roughriders Greg Wood DB Windsor

44. Montreal Alouettes Bill McIver DB Queen's

45. Edmonton Eskimos Mark Ackley WR Toronto

== 6th round ==
46. Toronto Argonauts Doug Falconer DB Ottawa

47. British Columbia Lions Greg Gardner QB British Columbia

48. Calgary Stampeders Nick Grittani DT Toronto

49. Hamilton Tiger-Cats Mike Sokonvin DT Toronto

50. Winnipeg Blue Bombers Gary Anderson DE Concordia

51. Ottawa Rough Riders Jim Anderson T Alberta

52. Saskatchewan Roughriders Hugh Gallagher DE Carleton

53. Montreal Alouettes Paul Szlichta QB Purdue

54. Edmonton Eskimos Jim Kemp T Saskatchewan

== 7th round ==
55. Toronto Argonauts John Montelpare LB Concordia

56. Toronto Argonauts Peter Sorenson DT Bishop's

57. Calgary Stampeders Mike Walukavich DT Concordia

58. Hamilton Tiger-Cats Rick Jeysman DT Toronto

59. Winnipeg Blue Bombers Claude Riopelle DE Western Ontario

60. Ottawa Rough Riders Fred Brown LB Wilfrid Laurier

61. Saskatchewan Roughriders Dalton Smarsh TB Alberta

62. Montreal Alouettes Rod Millard DB McMaster

63. Edmonton Eskimos Rob Nelms DT Carleton

== 8th round ==
64. Toronto Argonauts Jim Trimm TE Toronto

65. British Columbia Lions Glen Wallace TB Simon Fraser

66. Calgary Stampeders Bill Lockhart C Guelph

67. Hamilton Tiger-Cats Frank Mckay DB Western Ontario

68. Winnipeg Blue Bombers Bruce Young TB Manitoba

69. Ottawa Rough Riders Paul Lojewski G Windsor

70. Saskatchewan Roughriders Ken Platz TB Saskatchewan

71. Montreal Alouettes Larry Baines TB McMaster

72. Calgary Stampeders Norm Hagarty WR Wilfrid Laurier

== 9th round ==
73. Toronto Argonauts Gary McCann TB Windsor

74. British Columbia Lions Peter Coll DB Dalhousie

75. Calgary Stampeders Mike Weller WR Wilfrid Laurier

76. Hamilton Tiger-Cats Marty Dixon E Western Ontario

77. Winnipeg Blue Bombers Brian Wagner DE Manitoba

78. Ottawa Rough Riders Robert Forbes WR New Brunswick

79. Toronto Argonauts George Beattie DB Acadia

80. Calgary Stampeders Gordon Penn TB British Columbia

== 10th round ==
81. Toronto Argonauts Maurice St. Martin T Queen's

82. British Columbia Lions Tony Ricci G British Columbia

83. Calgary Stampeders Doug Ransome WR Dalhousie

84. Hamilton Tiger-Cats Jon Jewell LB Western Ontario

85. Winnipeg Blue Bombers Mike Kashty TE Manitoba

86. Ottawa Rough Riders Chris Kziezopoloski WR Waterloo

87. Toronto Argonauts Bernie Muldoon TB Windsor

88. British Columbia Lions Bob Janzen TB British Columbia
