= Willie Martin (Canadian football) =

American gridiron football player (born 1951)

Profile
- Position: Offensive tackle

Personal information
- Born: April 27, 1951 (age 75); Alexander City, Alabama, U.S.
- Listed height: 6 ft 5 in (1.96 m)
- Listed weight: 260 lb (118 kg)

Career information
- College: Northeastern State
- NFL draft: 1973: 13th round, 313th overall pick

Career history
- 1973–1978: Edmonton Eskimos
- 1979–1980: Hamilton Tiger-Cats
- 1981: Toronto Argonauts
- 1982: Winnipeg Blue Bombers

Awards and highlights
- 2× Grey Cup champion (1975, 1978); 2× CFL All-Star (1975, 1980); CFL East All-Star (1980); CFL West All-Star (1975)

Willie Martin (born April 27, 1951) is an American former professional football offensive lineman who played ten seasons in the Canadian Football League (CFL), six of them with the Edmonton Eskimos. He won two Grey Cups for the Eskimos.
