= Ron Estay =

American gridiron football player (born 1948)

No. 55, 78
- Position: Defensive lineman

Personal information
- Born: December 22, 1948 (age 77); Raceland, Louisiana, U.S.
- Listed height: 6 ft 1 in (1.85 m)
- Listed weight: 240 lb (109 kg)

Career information
- College: LSU
- NFL draft: 1972: 8th round, 186th overall pick

Career history
- 1972: BC Lions
- 1973–1982: Edmonton Eskimos
- 1983–1984: Washington Federals

Awards and highlights
- 6× Grey Cup champion (1975, 1978–1982); 2× CFL All-Star (1977, 1980); 4× CFL West All-Star (1973, 1977, 1978, 1980); Edmonton Eskimos Wall of Honour; First-team All-American (1971); First-team All-SEC (1971); Second-team All-SEC (1970)
- Canadian Football Hall of Fame (Class of 2003)

Ron Estay (born December 22, 1948) is an American former professional football defensive lineman for the Edmonton Eskimos of the Canadian Football League (CFL).

== Career ==
After graduating from Louisiana State University (LSU) in 1972, he was selected by the Denver Broncos in the 8th round of the 1972 NFL draft. He moved to Canada and played for the British Columbia Lions in 1972 and Edmonton from 1973 to 1982, and helped lead the team to five straight Grey Cup championships from 1978 to 1982 as a key member of the "Alberta Crude" defense. He played in 1983 and 1984 for the Washington Federals of the United States Football League (USFL).

Estay was a two time CFL All-Star in 1977 and 1980 and Western All-Star four times in 1973, 1977, 1978 and 1980. He played in nine Grey Cup championships, winning six times. One of Estay's biggest games was the 1977 Grey Cup also known as the 'Staples Game'. In that game, Estay recalls how, due to the nature of the game he 'tried every pair of shoes that we had' (in order to good footing due to the field conditions).

Estay is a member of the Canadian Football Hall of Fame, the Alberta Sports Hall of Fame, the Louisiana Sports Hall of Fame, and the Eskimos Hall of Fame.

== Coaching ==
From 2001 to 2008, Estay was the defensive line coach for the Saskatchewan Roughriders. He was a coach on the 2007 Grey Cup championship team.

== Personal ==
In 2008, Estay was diagnosed with non-Hodgkin's lymphoma, which went into remission after 3 months of chemotherapy.
