= Jeff Avery =

Canadian football player (born 1953)

Profile
- Positions: Wide receiver, Punter

Personal information
- Born: March 28, 1953 (age 73)
- Listed height: 6 ft 2 in (1.88 m)
- Listed weight: 185 lb (84 kg)

Career information
- University: Ottawa
- CFL draft: 1976

Career history
- 1976–1982: Ottawa Rough Riders

Awards and highlights
- Grey Cup champion (1976); 2× CFL East All-Star (1977, 1978)
- Canadian Football Hall of Fame (Class of 2017)

Jeff Avery (born March 28, 1953) is a Canadian former professional football wide receiver for the Ottawa Rough Riders of the Canadian Football League.

Avery played CIAU football for the Ottawa Gee-Gees, where he won the 1975 Vanier Cup. He was drafted as a territorial exemption in the 1976 CFL draft by the Rough Riders and would win the Grey Cup with the team that same year. Avery played seven seasons for the Rough Riders, being named a CFL East All-Star in 1977 and 1978.

Avery was an announcer for the Rough Riders and Ottawa Renegades and is the current radio analyst for the Ottawa Redblacks. He was inducted into the Canadian Football Hall of Fame in 2017 as a reporter.
