= Doug Scott (Canadian football) =

Canadian gridiron football player (born 1955)

No. 70
- Positions: Defensive end, Defensive tackle

Personal information
- Born: October 2, 1956 (age 70); Montreal, Quebec, Canada
- Listed height: 6 ft 3 in (1.91 m)
- Listed weight: 250 lb (113 kg)

Career information
- College: Boise State Broncos

Career history
- 1980–1981, 1986: Montreal Alouettes
- 1982–1985: Montreal Concordes

Awards and highlights
- CFL East All-Star (1984)

Doug Scott (born October 2, 1955) is a Canadian former professional football defensive lineman in the Canadian Football League who played for the Montreal Alouettes/Concordes. He played college football for the Boise State Broncos.
