= Danny Kepley =

American gridiron football player and coach (born 1953)

Dan Kepley
No. 42
- Position: Linebacker

Personal information
- Born: August 24, 1953 (age 73); Albemarle, North Carolina, U.S.
- Listed height: 6 ft 1 in (1.85 m)
- Listed weight: 220 lb (100 kg)

Career information
- College: East Carolina

Career history

Playing
- 1975–1984: Edmonton Eskimos

Coaching
- 1985: Edmonton Eskimos (Def. Assistant)
- 2002–2005: Edmonton Eskimos (Def. Assistant/DL coach)
- 2006–2010: Edmonton Eskimos (LB coach)

Awards and highlights
- 8× Grey Cup champion (1975, 1978–1982, 2003, 2005); 3× CFL's Most Outstanding Defensive Player Award (1977, 1980, 1981); 3× Norm Fieldgate Trophy (1977, 1980, 1981); 3× Dr. Beattie Martin Trophy (1977, 1980, 1981); 5× CFL All-Star (1977–1981); 5× CFL West All-Star (1977–1981); Second-team All-American (1974); Edmonton Eskimos Wall of Honour (1987)
- Canadian Football Hall of Fame (Class of 1996)

Daniel Kepley (born August 24, 1953) is a former star linebacker for the Edmonton Eskimos of the Canadian Football League (CFL).

Kepley played college football at East Carolina University. He tried out with the NFL's Dallas Cowboys before starting a 10-year career with the Eskimos from 1975 to 1984.

He was an intense player and hard tackler. Teamed with fellow linebackers Dale Potter and Tom Towns for 8 seasons, this trio formed the backbone of a defence that played in 7 Grey Cup games, winning six championships. Kepley won 3 CFL's Most Outstanding Defensive Player Awards and was an All Star 5 times.

Following retirement, Kepley spent the 1985 season as an assistant coach with the Eskimos. He began a real estate career, worked as a football analyst on both radio (CFRN) and television (CBC, ESPN), and from 2002 to 2010 was an assistant coach with the Eskimos. Kepley has struggled with alcoholism and in 2000 spent time in jail for impaired driving, his fifth such offence.

Kepley was inducted into the Canadian Football Hall of Fame in 1996, and in 2006 was named one of the CFL's Top 50 players (#11) of the league's modern era by Canadian sports network The Sports Network/TSN.
