= Ted Milian =

Canadian football player (born 1954)

No. 56
- Positions: Centre, Long snapper

Personal information
- Born: February 18, 1954 (age 72)
- Listed height: 6 ft 1 in (1.85 m)
- Listed weight: 250 lb (113 kg)

Career information
- University: Manitoba
- CFL draft: 1976

Career history
- 1976: Winnipeg Blue Bombers*
- 1978–1983: Edmonton Eskimos
- 1983: Calgary Stampeders
- * Offseason or practice squad member only

Awards and highlights
- 5× Grey Cup champion (1978–1982)

Ted Milian (born February 18, 1954) is a Canadian former professional football centre who played six seasons in the Canadian Football League (CFL) with the Edmonton Eskimos and Calgary Stampeders. He was a territorial selection of the Winnipeg Blue Bombers in the 1976 CFL draft. He played college football at the University of Manitoba.

== Biography ==
Ted Milian was born on February 18, 1954. He played college football for the Manitoba Bisons of the University of Manitoba.

Milian was a territorial pick of the Winnipeg Blue Bombers of the Canadian Football League (CFL) in the 1976 CFL draft. He was cut by the Blue Bombers before the start of the season on June 23, 1976. He then returned to finish his college football career with the Bisons, with his final year being in 1977. He earned All-Canadian honors and played in the inaugural Can-Am Bowl in Tampa, Florida after his senior year.

Milian signed with the Edmonton Eskimos of the CFL in April 1978. He dressed in all 80 games for the Eskimos from 1978 to 1982, winning five straight Grey Cups. He also spent time at long snapper during his CFL career. Milian dressed in three games for the Eskimos in 1983. He was a centre for the majority of his CFL career except for 1979, in which he was listed as an offensive guard.

On August 3, 1983, Milian and Harry Doering were traded to the Calgary Stampeders for Tom Krebs and a 1984 second round draft pick. If the 8–7 Stampeders had beat the 4–11 Saskatchewan Roughriders on November 6, 1983, in Calgary, then the Eskimos would have missed the playoffs for the first time since 1971. However, Milian's low, bouncing snap in the last minute of the game ended up giving the Roughriders good field position at Calgary's 43-yard line. Saskatchewan scored a touchdown several plays later and ended up winning the game 27–23. Overall, Milian dressed in 13 games for the Stampeders in 1983.

== Personal life ==
Milian's daughter, Elizabeth Milian, played college softball for the Ball State Cardinals.
