= Henry Waszczuk =

Canadian football player (born 1950)

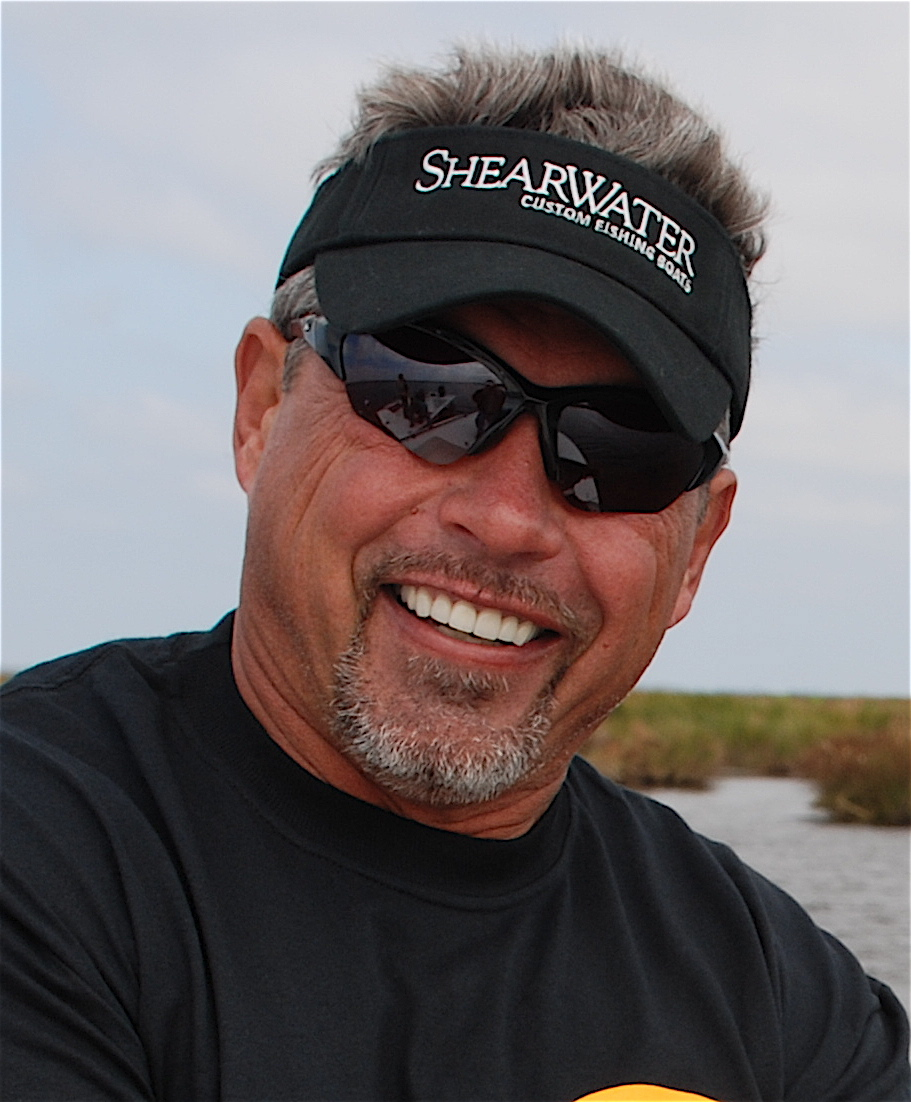

No. 50
- Position: Centre

Personal information
- Born: August 26, 1950 (age 76); Peterborough, England

Career information
- College: Kent State

Career history
- 1975–1984: Hamilton Tiger-Cats

Awards and highlights
- 5× CFL All-Star (1979, 1980, 1981, 1982, 1984); Tom Pate Memorial Award (1983)

Henry Waszczuk (born August 26, 1950, in Peterborough, England) is a former all star offensive lineman in the Canadian Football League. The six-time divisional All-Star played from 1975 to 1984 for the Hamilton Tiger-Cats. He also pioneered catch and release techniques used by anglers today and was involved in multiple charities now and during both his professional football and fishing careers.

Henry Waszczuk came to Canada at the age of two. He attended Eastdale Collegiate in Oshawa, and after a successful high school football career, he participated in the Telegram East-West All-Star Game and was named defensive player of the game. Waszczuk earned a football scholarship at Kent State University (Ohio) where the team won the Mid-America Conference Championship. In his senior year, Henry was selected an All-Conference centre and earned an All-American honourable mention.

Waszczuk's professional football career began in 1975 with the Hamilton Tiger Cats when he was drafted in the first round. During his 10-year career, he was an All-Star at centre seven times and made two Grey Cup appearances (1980, 1984). As a Ticat, Waszczuk was awarded the Tom Pate Memorial Award for his contribution to the team, his community and the league. He also was chosen as the Rothman's Outstanding Lineman on three occasions and was also nominated for the Schenley Awards three times. More recently, Waszczuk was selected to the all-time Hamilton Tiger Cat "Dream Team".

Throughout his 10-year career, Waszczuk taught high school with the Hamilton Board of Education where he served as a Science Department Head.

After his retirement from the CFL in 1985, Waszczuk co-founded Canadian Sportfishing, a multi-media company. Henry co-hosted and was Executive Producer of various TV shows including Extreme Fishing, Sportfishing Adventures and the Canadian Sportfishing TV show, which aired for 14 years (1986–1999). He is now host of two award-winning TV shows, Fins & Skins Classic Adventures and Fishing the Flats TV, which air on major TV networks across North America. In Canada, the shows air on TSN and in the U.S. the shows air on FOX Sports through Sun Sports in Florida, WFNHD and Tuff TV. Waszczuk has produced and hosted over 2,000 TV shows and is entering his 35th season on air. He is also publisher of Fins & Skins Travel Magazine and has co-authored eight sportfishing books.

He was inducted into the Oshawa Hall of Fame in May 1989.
