= John Palazeti =

American gridiron football player (born 1952)

Profile
- Position: Fullback/Linebacker

Personal information
- Born: December 17, 1952 (age 73)
- Listed height: 6 ft 1 in (1.85 m)
- Listed weight: 215 lb (98 kg)

Career information
- High school: Assumption College School
- College: Richmond
- CFL draft: 1976

Career history
- 1976: Ottawa Rough Riders
- 1977–1981: Calgary Stampeders
- 1982: Montreal Concordes
- 1983: Calgary Stampeders
- 1983: Toronto Argonauts

Awards and highlights
- 2× Grey Cup champion (1976, 1983)

Career CFL statistics
- Rushing yards: 119
- Rushing touchdowns: 1
- Receptions: 20
- Receiving yards: 195
- Receiving touchdowns: 1
- Interceptions: 6

John Palazeti (born December 17, 1952) is an American former football fullback and linebacker who played in the Canadian Football League (CFL).

== Early life ==
Palazeti was born and grew up in Detroit, Michigan and attended Assumption College School in Windsor, Ontario as a boarding student.

== College career ==
Palazeti was a four year member of the Richmond Spiders and a three year starter. As a senior he was named team captain and rushed for 130 yards and caught a touchdown pass in a 28-24 near upset of Georgia. Palazeti finished his collegiate career with 267 carries for 1,112 yards and eight touchdowns and 25 receptions for 200 yards and one touchdown.

== Professional career ==
Because he attended high school in Canada, Palazeti was designated a non-import player and was selected as a territorial exemption in the 1976 CFL draft by the Ottawa Rough Riders. He played primarily linebacker and was featured at fullback throughout his career. As a rookie, Palazeti was a member of the Rough Riders Grey Cup championship team. Following the end of the season Ottawa traded him to the Calgary Stampeders. Palazeti was traded to the Montreal Concordes in 1982. He returned to Calgary in 1983, but was traded again to the Toronto Argonauts and was a member of the team when they won the Grey Cup at the end of the season.

== Personal life ==
Palazeti's brother Joe also played football at Richmond and his brother Marty played college football at Marshall University and in the CFL for two seasons. His nephew, Vinnie Palazeti, played college football at Ball State.
