= Bruce Clark (gridiron football) =

American gridiron football player (born 1958)

No. 75, 95
- Position: Defensive end

Personal information
- Born: March 31, 1958 (age 68); New Castle, Pennsylvania, U.S.
- Listed height: 6 ft 3 in (1.91 m)
- Listed weight: 273 lb (124 kg)

Career information
- High school: New Castle
- College: Penn State (1976–1979)
- NFL draft: 1980: 1st round, 4th overall pick

Career history
- Green Bay Packers (1980)*; Toronto Argonauts (1980–1981); New Orleans Saints (1982–1988); Kansas City Chiefs (1989); Detroit Drive (1991); Barcelona Dragons (1991–1992)
- * Offseason or practice squad member only

Awards and highlights
- Pro Bowl (1984); PFWA All-Rookie Team (1982); CFL All Star (1980); Lombardi Award (1978); Unanimous All-American (1978); 2× First-team All-East (1978, 1979)

Career NFL statistics
- Sacks: 39.5
- Safeties: 1
- Fumble recoveries: 9
- Interceptions: 1
- Stats at Pro Football Reference

Career AFL statistics
- Tackles: 6
- Sacks: 0.5
- Stats at ArenaFan.com

Bruce M. Clark (March 31, 1958) is an American former professional football player who was a defensive end for 10 seasons in the Canadian Football League (CFL) and National Football League (NFL) during the 1980s. Clark played college football for the Penn State Nittany Lions, earning All-American honors. He was the fourth pick overall in the 1980 NFL draft, but chose to play for the CFL's Toronto Argonauts before joining the NFL's New Orleans Saints and Kansas City Chiefs.

== Early life ==
Clark was born in New Castle, Pennsylvania.

== College career ==
Clark attended Penn State University, where he played for coach Joe Paterno's Penn State Nittany Lions football team from 1976 to 1979. As a junior in 1978, Clark became the first junior to win the Lombardi Award as the best college defensive lineman. He was recognized a consensus first-team All-American as a senior in 1979. He was a Member of the Phi Gamma Delta Fraternity.

== Professional career ==
The Green Bay Packers selected Clark in the first round (fourth pick overall) of the 1980 NFL Draft, but he refused to play for them, and instead joined the Toronto Argonauts of the CFL. After two years in Canada, he played for the NFL's New Orleans Saints for seven seasons from 1982 to 1988, and then played for the Kansas City Chiefs in 1989, his final NFL season.

He later played a single season for the World League of American Football's Barcelona Dragons. Clark was drafted in the first round of the supplemental draft by the Barcelona Dragons in 1991. His experience and leadership were key to the Dragons successful first season. Clark started all ten games and was co-leader in sacks with seven that season.
