= Dale Potter =

Canadian football player

No. 30
- Position: Linebacker

Personal information
- Born: November 9, 1949 (age 76); Ottawa, Ontario, Canada
- Listed height: 6 ft 2 in (1.88 m)
- Listed weight: 230 lb (104 kg)

Career information
- University: Ottawa

Career history
- 1973: Winnipeg Blue Bombers
- 1974–1983: Edmonton Eskimos
- 1984: Toronto Argonauts

Awards and highlights
- 6× Grey Cup champion (1975, 1978–1982); Grey Cup MVP (1980); Dick Suderman Trophy (1980); CFL All-Star (1980); CFL West All-Star (1980)

Dale William Potter (born November 9, 1949) is a former star linebacker for the Edmonton Eskimos of the Canadian Football League (CFL).

Potter played his university football with the University of Ottawa Gee Gees; he was named their most valuable player of 1971, and was made captain in 1972. He began a 12-year career with the Eskimos in 1974. During this time, he was paired with Danny Kepley and Tom Towns for eight years, forming a linebacking unit that led Edmonton to reach the Grey Cup final seven times, winning six out of seven. Potter won Defensive Player of the Game and all star in 1980. He finished his career in 1984 with the Toronto Argonauts, playing 5 games.
