= Dave Newman (Canadian football) =

American gridiron football player (born 1958)

Profile
- Position: Wide receiver

Personal information
- Born: June 27, 1958 (age 68); Kirksville, Missouri, U.S.
- Listed height: 6 ft 1 in (1.85 m)
- Listed weight: 175 lb (79 kg)

Career information
- College: University of Missouri

Career history
- 1980–82: Toronto Argonauts
- 1983–85: Ottawa Rough Riders

Awards and highlights
- CFL All-Star (1980); Frank M. Gibson Trophy (1980)

Dave Newman is a former award winning Canadian Football League (CFL) wide receiver.

Newman played his college football at University of Missouri. In his first CFL season, with the Toronto Argonauts, he caught 50 passes for 823 yards and 10 touchdowns, winning him the Frank M. Gibson Trophy as top rookie in the CFL East and an All-Star selection. He later played with the Ottawa Rough Riders. After 6 seasons he retired having caught 196 passes for 3145 yards and 35 touchdowns (one on a punt return).
