= William Miller (gridiron football) =

American gridiron football player (1957–2019)

No. 33, 22
- Position: Running back

Personal information
- Born: January 3, 1957; Rison, Arkansas, U.S.
- Died: January 3, 2019 (aged 62); Little Rock, Arkansas, U.S.

Career information
- College: Ouachita Baptist

Career history
- Atlanta Falcons (1979)*; Calgary Stampeders (1980)*; Winnipeg Blue Bombers (1980–1982); Cleveland Browns (1983)*; Pittsburgh Maulers (1984); Tampa Bay Bandits (1985)*; Orlando Renegades (1985); Toronto Argonauts (1986)
- * Offseason or practice squad member only

Awards and highlights
- Eddie James Memorial Trophy (1982); CFL's Most Outstanding Rookie Award (1980); Jackie Parker Trophy (1980); 2× CFL All-Star (1980, 1982)

William Edward Miller (January 3, 1957 – January 3, 2019) was an American professional football player who was a running back in the Canadian Football League (CFL) and United States Football League (USFL).

Miller played college football at Ouachita Baptist University from 1975 to 1978, where he rushed for 3,813 career yards and was inducted into their Athletics Hall of Fame in 2003.

He joined the CFL's Winnipeg Blue Bombers in 1980, rushing for 1,053 yards. He was named an all star and won the CFL's Most Outstanding Rookie Award. He rushed for 684 yards in 1981 and 1076 yards in 1982, being named an all star in 1982. He played three seasons total with Winnipeg and totaled 21 touchdowns.

He moved to the USFL in 1984 with the Pittsburgh Maulers. After playing 1985 with the Orlando Renegades, he returned to the CFL for one last season, playing 5 games with the Toronto Argonauts in 1986. Miller died on his 62nd birthday, January 3, 2019, from cancer.
