= John Pankratz =

American gridiron football player (born 1961)

No. 21
- Position: Wide receiver

Personal information
- Born: June 23, 1957 (age 69); Vancouver, British Columbia, Canada
- Listed height: 6 ft 0 in (1.83 m)
- Listed weight: 180 lb (82 kg)

Career information
- College: Simon Fraser

Career history
- 1980-1987: BC Lions

Awards and highlights
- Grey Cup champion (1985)

John Pankratz (born June 23, 1957) is a Canadian former professional football player who was a wide receiver in the Canadian Football League (CFL) for the BC Lions for eight seasons.
