= Bob Gaddis =

American gridiron football player (born 1952)

No. 15, 22, 89
- Position: Wide receiver

Personal information
- Born: January 20, 1952 (age 74); Jackson, Mississippi, U.S.
- Listed height: 5 ft 11 in (1.80 m)
- Listed weight: 178 lb (81 kg)

Career information
- College: Mississippi Valley State
- NFL draft: 1975: 13th round, 337th overall pick

Career history
- Buffalo Bills (1976); Montreal Alouettes (1977–1979); Toronto Argonauts (1980–1981); Winnipeg Blue Bombers (1981)

Awards and highlights
- Super Bowl champion (X); Grey Cup champion (1977); CFL All-Star (1978)

Career NFL statistics
- Games played: 2
- Punt returns: 1
- Kick returns: 1
- Stats at Pro Football Reference

Robert C. (Bob) Gaddis (born January 20, 1952) is an American former professional football player who was a wide receiver in the National Football League (NFL) and Canadian Football League (CFL). He played college football for the Mississippi Valley State Delta Devils and was selected by the Pittsburgh Steelers in the 13th round (#337 overall) of the 1975 NFL draft. He played with the Buffalo Bills in 1976 and then five seasons in the CFL for three teams. He won a Grey Cup championship in 1977 as a member of the Montreal Alouettes.
