= Tom Towns =

Canadian football player (born 1953)

Profile
- Position: Linebacker

Personal information
- Born: March 17, 1953 (age 73); Rosetown, Saskatchewan, Canada
- Listed height: 6 ft 0 in (1.83 m)
- Listed weight: 220 lb (100 kg)

Career information
- University: Alberta

Career history
- 1975–1984: Edmonton Eskimos
- 1985: Ottawa Rough Riders

Awards and highlights
- 6× Grey Cup champion (1975, 1978, 1979, 1980, 1981, 1982); CFL West All-Star (1980)

Tom Towns (March 17, 1953) is a Canadian former professional football linebacker for the Edmonton Eskimos of the Canadian Football League (CFL).

Towns played his university football with the University of Alberta Golden Bears. In 1972 he was on the starting lineup in the Vanier Cup Championship team. In 1973 he played on offense and defense for the Golden Bears, and was named as a Canada West All Star in 1973 and 1974. He was also selected to the All Canadian CIAU Team.

He began a ten-year career with the Eskimos on 1975. During this time, he was paired with Danny Kepley and Dale Potter for eight years, forming a linebacking unit that led Edmonton to 7 Grey Cups and 6 Grey Cup victories. Towns was an all-star in 1980, and finished his career in 1985, after being traded to the Ottawa Rough Riders.
