= Mike Holmes (wide receiver) =

American gridiron football player (born 1950)

No. 20, 86, 43
- Positions: Safety, Wide receiver

Personal information
- Born: November 18, 1950 (age 75); Galveston, Texas, U.S.
- Listed height: 6 ft 2 in (1.88 m)
- Listed weight: 193 lb (88 kg)

Career information
- High school: Ball (Galveston)
- College: Texas Southern
- NFL draft: 1973: 1st round, 18th overall pick

Career history
- San Francisco 49ers (1974–1975); Buffalo Bills (1976); Miami Dolphins (1976); Winnipeg Blue Bombers (1977–1982); Washington Federals (1983)

Awards and highlights
- CFL All-Star (1980); Second-team Little All-American (1971)

Career NFL statistics
- Interceptions: 3
- Fumble recoveries: 4
- Receptions: 17
- Receiving yards: 231
- Receiving touchdowns: 1
- Stats at Pro Football Reference

Michael Raphael Holmes (born November 18, 1950) is an American former professional football player who was a safety and wide receiver in the National Football League (NFL), Canadian Football League (CFL), and United States Football League (USFL).

Holmes started his career in the NFL, playing three seasons, mainly for the San Francisco 49ers. He then went to the CFL where he played six seasons for the Winnipeg Blue Bombers. He was a CFL All Star in 1980. He finished his career with the Washington Federals of the USFL in 1983.
