= Myke Horton =

American gridiron football player (born 1954)

Profile
- Position: Guard

Personal information
- Born: July 17, 1954 (age 72); Portland, Oregon, U.S.
- Listed height: 6 ft 3 in (1.91 m)
- Listed weight: 260 lb (118 kg)

Career information
- High school: A.C. Davis (Yakima, Washington)
- College: Gavilan JC (1971–1972); UCLA (1973–1974)
- NFL draft: 1975: 17th round, 428th overall pick

Career history
- 1975: Toronto Argonauts
- 1979–80: Calgary Stampeders
- 1983: Washington Federals
- 1984: Memphis Showboats

Awards and highlights
- CFL West All-Star (1980); Second-team All-Pac-8 (1974)

Michael "Myke" Horton (born July 17, 1954) is an American former football player who played professionally for the Calgary Stampeders and Toronto Argonauts of the Canadian Football League (CFL).

After his professional football career was curtailed by an Achilles tendon injury, Horton sought work in the entertainment industry. He was a game show contestant on Press Your Luck and Card Sharks. He is best known for appearing on five seasons of the television show American Gladiators as "Gemini" - the only one of the six original Gladiators in the pilot episode to stay with the series.

== Personal life ==
Horton grew up in Yakima, Washington before attending the UCLA to play football. After his athletic career, he became a personal trainer. His two sons, Shane and Wes, also played professional football.
