= Reggie Lewis (defensive lineman) =

American gridiron football player (1954–2008)

No. 60
- Positions: Defensive end, defensive tackle

Personal information
- Born: January 20, 1954; New Orleans, Louisiana, U.S.
- Died: September 19, 2008 (aged 54)
- Listed height: 6 ft 2 in (1.88 m)
- Listed weight: 252 lb (114 kg)

Career information
- High school: Crenshaw (Los Angeles, California)
- College: Oregon; San Diego State
- NFL draft: 1976: 16th round, 443rd overall pick

Career history
- 1977–1981: Calgary Stampeders
- 1981: Toronto Argonauts
- 1982–1984: New Orleans Saints

Awards and highlights
- 3× CFL All-Star (1978, 1979, 1980); First-team All-Pac-8 (1973)
- Stats at Pro Football Reference

Reginald Anthony Lewis (January 20, 1954 – September 19, 2008) was an American professional football defensive lineman who played three seasons in the National Football League (NFL) for the New Orleans Saints. He was selected in the 16th round of the 1976 NFL draft by the San Francisco 49ers, but chose to play in the Canadian Football League (CFL) for the Calgary Stampeders and Toronto Argonauts, where he was a three time All-Star.

Lewis played college football at University of Oregon and San Diego State University. He died in September 2008 at the age of 54.
