= Alan Moffat =

Canadian football player (1952–2025)

Profile
- Position: Guard

Personal information
- Born: May 7, 1952; Brantford, Ontario, Canada
- Died: August 29, 2025 (aged 73); Ottawa, Ontario, Canada
- Listed height: 6 ft 4 in (1.93 m)
- Listed weight: 265 lb (120 kg)

Career information
- University: Ottawa
- CFL draft: 1976: 1st round, 3rd overall pick

Career history
- 1978–1982: Hamilton Tiger-Cats

Awards and highlights
- CFL East All-Star (1980)

Alan Moffat (May 7, 1952 – August 29, 2025) was a Canadian football player who played professionally for the Hamilton Tiger-Cats.
