= Harry Holt (gridiron football) =

American gridiron football player (born 1957)

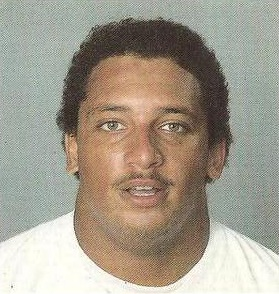

No. 81, 85
- Position: Tight end

Personal information
- Born: December 29, 1957; Harlingen, Texas
- Died: November 24, 2023 (aged 65); Des Moines, Iowa
- Listed height: 6 ft 4 in (1.93 m)
- Listed weight: 236 lb (107 kg)

Career information
- High school: Tucson, Arizona, Sunnyside
- College: Arizona

Career history
- BC Lions (1978–1982); Cleveland Browns (1983–1986); San Diego Chargers (1987)

Career statistics
- Receptions: 70
- Yards: 893
- Touchdowns: 5
- Stats at Pro Football Reference

Career CFL statistics
- Receptions: 137
- Yards: 2,364
- Touchdowns: 14

Harry Holt (born December 29, 1957) was a former football player in the CFL for five years and in the NFL for five years. Holt played tight end for the British Columbia Lions from 1978 to 1982, the Cleveland Browns from 1983 to 1986 and the San Diego Chargers in 1987. He played college football at the University of Arizona. He signed to play for U of A in 1976 while playing high school football at Sunnyside High School in Tucson, Arizona.

Holt was selected to the Lions' 2004 50th Anniversary Dream Team.
