= Billy Hardee =

American football player (1954–2011)

No. 23, 37
- Position: Defensive back

Personal information
- Born: August 12, 1954; Lakeland, Florida, U.S.
- Died: July 4, 2011 (aged 56); Phoenix, Arizona, U.S.
- Listed height: 6 ft 0 in (1.83 m)
- Listed weight: 184 lb (83 kg)

Career information
- High school: Mulberry
- College: Virginia Tech
- NFL draft: 1976: undrafted

Career history
- Denver Broncos (1976); New York Jets (1977); Calgary Stampeders (1978); Toronto Argonauts (1978–1981); Ottawa Rough Riders (1981-1982); Philadelphia/Baltimore Stars (1984-1985)
- Stats at Pro Football Reference

William Abraham Hardee Jr. (August 12, 1954 – July 4, 2011) was an American professional football player who was a defensive back in the National Football League (NFL), Canadian Football League (CFL) and United States Football League (USFL) during the 1970s and 1980s. He played college football for the Virginia Tech Hokies.

== College career ==
Hardee played at Virginia Tech from 1972 to 1975. Hardee started his collegiate career as a wide receiver, transitioning to defensive back in 1974. Hardee finished in the Top 10 nationally in 1975, with seven interceptions. This, along with his work as a kickoff returner, earned him Honorable Mention as an AP All American and a spot on the National Independent All-Star Football squad. Hardee was elected into the Virginia Tech Sports Hall of Fame in 2005.

== Professional career ==
Following graduation from Virginia Tech, Hardee went on to play in the National Football League, the Canadian Football League and the United States Football League. Hardee retired from professional football in 1985.

== After retirement ==
He worked in the administration department at Lake Region High School in Eagle Lake, Florida. He and his wife Deborah had three children. A son, Billy III, followed in his father's footsteps and played football for the Hokies from 1999 to 2001.

== Death ==
Hardee died from injuries sustained from a motorcycle accident near Phoenix, Arizona. He was in a coma for two days and died shortly thereafter July 4, 2011.
