= Ed McAleney =

American football player (born 1953)

No. 64
- Position: Defensive tackle

Personal information
- Born: September 21, 1953 (age 73); South Portland, Maine, U.S.

Career information
- College: Massachusetts
- NFL draft: 1976: 8th round, 237th overall pick

Career history
- 1976: Tampa Bay Buccaneers (NFL)
- 1977–1983: Calgary Stampeders (CFL)
- 1984: Pittsburgh Maulers
- 1985: Orlando Renegades - (USFL)

Awards and highlights
- First-team All-East (1975); Second-team All-East (1973)
- Stats at Pro Football Reference

Edward P. McAleney (born September 21, 1953) is an American former professional football defensive lineman who played one season in the National Football League (NFL) for the Tampa Bay Buccaneers.

He was selected in the eighth round of the 1976 NFL draft by the Pittsburgh Steelers. He later played in the Canadian Football League (CFL) for the Calgary Stampeders where he was named Western All-Star in 1980, and he finished his pro career with the Orlando Renegades of the USFL in 1985.

McAleney played college football at University of Massachusetts Amherst.
