= Bernie Ruoff =

German gridiron football player (born 1951)

No. 10
- Position: Punter; Placekicker

Personal information
- Born: October 12, 1951 (age 75); West Germany

Career information
- College: Syracuse University

Career history
- 1975–1979: Winnipeg Blue Bombers
- 1980–1987: Hamilton Tiger-Cats
- 1988: New England Steamrollers
- 1988: BC Lions

Awards and highlights
- Grey Cup champion (1986); 2× Dave Dryburgh Memorial Trophy (1976, 1979); 2× CFL All-Star (1980, 1984)

Bernd A. Ruoff (born October 12, 1951) is a former punter and placekicker for the Winnipeg Blue Bombers from 1975 to 1979 and the Hamilton Tiger-Cats from 1980 to 1987 of the Canadian Football League (CFL). He finished his CFL career in 1988, playing 5 games for the British Columbia Lions. Ruoff scored 1,772 points in 14 seasons in the CFL and is one of the leading scorers in league history. He also holds CFL records for the most punts in one game (22 in 1984), and most punting yards in one game (1,054 in 1984). He attended college at Syracuse University, where he played for Hall of Fame coach Ben Schwartzwalder. He attended Cameron Heights Collegiate School.

Ruoff also played for one season in the Arena Football League as a member of the Providence, Rhode Island–based New England Steamrollers in the summer of 1988.
