= Butch Norman =

Canadian football player (born 1952)

Profile
- Position: Offensive tackle

Personal information
- Born: August 23, 1952 (age 74); Luverne, Alabama, US
- Died: October 13, 2025; Luverne, Alabama, US
- Listed height: 6 ft 6 in (1.98 m)
- Listed weight: 250 lb (113 kg)

Career information
- College: Alabama

Career history
- 1974–1980: Winnipeg Blue Bombers

Awards and highlights
- CFL West All-Star (1976, 1978, 1980)

Haywood Eugene "Butch" Norman (born August 23, 1952) is an American-born Canadian football player who played professionally for the Winnipeg Blue Bombers.
