= 1980 CFL season =

Canadian Football League season

- East champions: Hamilton Tiger-Cats
- West champions: Edmonton Eskimos

68th Grey Cup
- Date: 23 November 1980
- Champions: Edmonton Eskimos

CFL seasons
- 1979 1981

Canadian Football League team locations: West, East

The 1980 CFL season is considered to be the 27th season in modern-day Canadian football, although it is officially the 23rd Canadian Football League season.

== CFL news in 1980 ==
The Canadian Football League signed a three-year television contract with Carling O'Keefe Breweries for $15.6 million.

== Regular season standings ==
West Division
Pos	Team	Pld	W	L	T	PF	PA	PD	Pts
1	Edmonton Eskimos (C, Q)	16	13	3	0	505	281	+224	26
2	Winnipeg Blue Bombers (Q)	16	10	6	0	394	387	+7	20
3	Calgary Stampeders (Q)	16	9	7	0	407	355	+52	18
4	BC Lions	16	8	7	1	381	351	+30	17
5	Saskatchewan Roughriders	16	2	14	0	284	469	−185	4

(C) First round bye; (Q) Qualified for playoffs

East Division
Pos	Team	Pld	W	L	T	PF	PA	PD	Pts
1	Hamilton Tiger-Cats (C, Q)	16	8	7	1	332	377	−45	17
2	Montreal Alouettes (Q)	16	8	8	0	356	375	−19	16
3	Ottawa Rough Riders (Q)	16	7	9	0	353	393	−40	14
4	Toronto Argonauts	16	6	10	0	334	358	−24	12

(C) First round bye; (Q) Qualified for playoffs

Edmonton and Hamilton have first round byes.

== Grey Cup playoffs ==
The Edmonton Eskimos won their third-straight Grey Cup in 1980, defeating the Hamilton Tiger-Cats, 48–10, at Toronto's Exhibition Stadium. The Eskimos' Warren Moon (QB) was named the Grey Cup's Most Valuable Player on Offence and Dale Potter (LB) was named the Grey Cup's Most Valuable Player on Defence and the Grey Cup's Most Valuable Canadian.

=== Playoff bracket ===
November 8/9: Division Semifinals
East
E3	Ottawa Rough Riders	21
E2	Montreal Alouettes	25
West
W3	Calgary Stampeders	14
W2	Winnipeg Blue Bombers	32

November 15/16: Division Finals
E2	Montreal Alouettes	13
E1	Hamilton Tiger-Cats	24
W2	Winnipeg Blue Bombers	24
W1	Edmonton Eskimos	34

November 23: 68th Grey Cup @ Exhibition Stadium – Toronto, Ontario
E1	Hamilton Tiger-Cats	10
W1	Edmonton Eskimos	48

== CFL leaders ==
- CFL passing leaders
- CFL rushing leaders
- CFL receiving leaders

== 1980 CFL All-Stars ==
=== Offence ===
- QB – Dieter Brock, Winnipeg Blue Bombers
- RB – James Sykes, Calgary Stampeders
- RB – William Miller, Winnipeg Blue Bombers
- SB – Tom Scott, Edmonton Eskimos
- TE – Tony Gabriel, Ottawa Rough Riders
- WR – Brian Kelly, Edmonton Eskimos
- WR – Mike Holmes, Winnipeg Blue Bombers
- C – Al Wilson, BC Lions
- OG – Larry Butler, Winnipeg Blue Bombers
- OG – Val Belcher, Ottawa Rough Riders
- OT – Mike Wilson, Edmonton Eskimos
- OT – Butch Norman, Winnipeg Blue Bombers

=== Defence ===
- DT – Dave Fennell, Edmonton Eskimos
- DT – Bruce Clark, Toronto Argonauts
- DE – Ron Estay, Edmonton Eskimos
- DE – Reggie Lewis, Calgary Stampeders
- LB – Danny Kepley, Edmonton Eskimos
- LB – Ben Zambiasi, Hamilton Tiger-Cats
- LB – Dale Potter, Edmonton Eskimos
- DB – Ray Odums, Calgary Stampeders
- DB – Dickie Harris, Montreal Alouettes
- DB – David Shaw, Hamilton Tiger-Cats
- DB – Ed Jones, Edmonton Eskimos
- DB – Gregg Butler, Edmonton Eskimos
- DB – Ken McEachern, Saskatchewan Roughriders

=== Special teams ===
- P – Hank Ilesic, Edmonton Eskimos
- K – Bernie Ruoff, Hamilton Tiger-Cats

== 1980 Western All-Stars ==
=== Offence ===
- QB – Dieter Brock, Winnipeg Blue Bombers
- RB – James Sykes, Calgary Stampeders
- RB – William Miller, Winnipeg Blue Bombers
- SB – Tom Scott, Edmonton Eskimos
- TE – Harry Holt, BC Lions
- WR – Brian Kelly, Edmonton Eskimos
- WR – Mike Holmes, Winnipeg Blue Bombers
- C – Al Wilson, BC Lions
- OG – Larry Butler, Winnipeg Blue Bombers
- OG – Myke Horton, Calgary Stampeders
- OT – Mike Wilson, Edmonton Eskimos
- OT – Butch Norman, Winnipeg Blue Bombers

=== Defence ===
- DT – Dave Fennell, Edmonton Eskimos
- DT – Ed McAleney, Calgary Stampeders
- DE – Ron Estay, Edmonton Eskimos
- DE – Reggie Lewis, Calgary Stampeders
- LB – Danny Kepley, Edmonton Eskimos
- LB – Tom Towns, Edmonton Eskimos
- LB – Dale Potter, Edmonton Eskimos
- DB – Ray Odums, Calgary Stampeders
- DB – Charles Williams, Winnipeg Blue Bombers
- DB – Ed Jones, Edmonton Eskimos
- DB – Greg Butler, Edmonton Eskimos
- DB – Ken McEachern, Saskatchewan Roughriders

=== Special teams ===
- P – Hank Ilesic, Edmonton Eskimos
- K – Dave Cutler, Edmonton Eskimos
- K – Lui Passaglia, BC Lions

== 1980 Eastern All-Stars ==
=== Offence ===
- QB – Gerry Dattilio, Montreal Alouettes
- RB – Richard Crump, Ottawa Rough Riders
- RB – Alvin Walker, Montreal Alouettes
- SB – Dave Newman, Toronto Argonauts
- TE – Tony Gabriel, Ottawa Rough Riders
- WR – Bob Gaddis, Toronto Argonauts
- WR – Keith Baker, Montreal Alouettes
- C – Henry Waszczuk, Hamilton Tiger-Cats
- OG – Alan Moffat, Hamilton Tiger-Cats
- OG – Val Belcher, Ottawa Rough Riders
- OT – Doug Payton, Montreal Alouettes
- OT – Willie Martin, Hamilton Tiger-Cats

=== Defence ===
- DT – Mike Raines, Ottawa Rough Riders
- DT – Bruce Clark, Toronto Argonauts
- DE – Jim Corrigall, Toronto Argonauts
- DE – Junior Ah You, Montreal Alouettes
- LB – Ron Foxx, Ottawa Rough Riders
- LB – Ben Zambiasi, Hamilton Tiger-Cats
- LB – Rick Sowieta, Ottawa Rough Riders
- LB – Tom Cousineau, Montreal Alouettes
- DB – Dickie Harris, Montreal Alouettes
- DB – David Shaw, Hamilton Tiger-Cats
- DB – Jerry Anderson, Hamilton Tiger-Cats
- DB – Harold Woods, Hamilton Tiger-Cats
- DB – Billy Hardee, Toronto Argonauts

=== Special teams ===
- P – Zenon Andrusyshyn, Toronto Argonauts
- K – Bernie Ruoff, Hamilton Tiger-Cats

== 1980 CFL awards ==
- CFL's Most Outstanding Player Award – Dieter Brock (QB), Winnipeg Blue Bombers
- CFL's Most Outstanding Canadian Award – Gerry Dattilio (QB), Montreal Alouettes
- CFL's Most Outstanding Defensive Player Award – Danny Kepley (LB), Edmonton Eskimos
- CFL's Most Outstanding Offensive Lineman Award – Mike Wilson (OT), Edmonton Eskimos
- CFL's Most Outstanding Rookie Award – William Miller (RB), Winnipeg Blue Bombers
- CFLPA's Outstanding Community Service Award – Jim Coode (OT), Ottawa Rough Riders
- CFL's Coach of the Year – Ray Jauch, Winnipeg Blue Bombers
