= CFL on NBC =

Branding for Canadian Football League games on US TV

- Country of origin: United States

Production
- Running time: 3 hours

Original release
- Network: NBCSN (2012–2013)
- Release: 2012 – 2013

CFL on NBC is a de facto branding for the Canadian Football League (CFL) games that have been carried on American broadcaster NBC or its sports network, NBCSN.

== Background ==
=== NBC's first attempt (1954) ===
NBC's first run broadcasting Canadian football involved coverage of a collection of Big Four/IRFU (the predecessor to the CFL's East Division) games and the Grey Cup in 1954. NBC's coverage during this period (simulcasting the Canadian national broadcaster) provided far more coverage than the NFL's existing contract with DuMont. NBC aired games on Saturday afternoons, competing against college football broadcasts on CBS and ABC (at the time, college football telecasts were far more restricted than are today). The revenue from the contract allowed the IRFU to directly compete against the NFL for players during the 1950s; the American viewership arguably prompted the league to finally raise the point value of touchdowns from 5 points to 6, as it has been in the American game since 1912, in 1956, and to play some exhibition and regular season games in the United States beginning in 1957. Interest in the CFL in the United States faded dramatically after the debut of the American Football League in 1960.

Between 1955 and 1980, only one game was televised on U.S. television, the 1962 Grey Cup (which was broadcast by ABC).

=== 1982 experimentation ===
NBC (with the exception of its northernmost affiliates that were located close to the Canadian border) broadcast games in the CFL for three weeks during the 1982 NFL players' strike The first week of broadcasts featured the NFL on NBC broadcast teams, before a series of blowout games on the network and the resulting low ratings resulted in NBC cutting back and eventually cancelling its CFL coverage. (At the time, ESPN held the U.S. broadcast rights, who sublicensed them to NBC during the strike; rights reverted to ESPN after the experiment failed.) The announcers who called the games for NBC are in parentheses.

- Sept 26
  - British Columbia 46 @ Toronto 14 (Don Criqui and John Brodie)
  - Calgary 17 @ Edmonton 36 (Dick Enberg and Merlin Olsen)
- Oct 3
  - Calgary 8 @ Saskatchewan 53 (Don Criqui, John Brodie, and Bob Trumpy)
- Oct 10
  - British Columbia 1 @ Edmonton 30 (Charlie Jones, Merlin Olsen, and Mike Haffner)

There were blackouts of the CFL games. The blackouts weren't exactly because of not selling out the stadiums, but for being too close to Canada. For instance NBC's affiliate in Syracuse did not get these games. Their TV listings showed these CFL games on CKWS 11 (CBC Kingston, Ontario), while NBC (WSTM 3) listed “NFL Football New England at Buffalo (if strike settled) or movie” for Sunday, October 3.

A game between featuring the Edmonton Eskimos at the Winnipeg Blue Bombers was tentatively scheduled for 1:30 p.m. Eastern Time on Sunday October 17, even making newspaper TV listings. At the last moment NBC cancelled the broadcast. The network was worried that the game would run over its allotted time and conflict with Game 5 of the 1982 World Series, which was supposed to begin at 4:30. NBC did not resume CFL broadcasts afterwards. As previously mentioned, the games it showed had mostly been blowouts and the network even ended its October 3, 1982 broadcast "Heidi Game" style before the game ended in order to not delay prime time programming.

The decision to air CFL games during the strike was parodied by Second City Television, itself an originally Canadian show which was aired by NBC. An episode of the series had the fictional SCTV network go dark due to a strike by the janitorial union; replacement programming was "sourced" from the CBC, including shows such as "Magnum, P.E.I." and a spoof of the film Goin' Down the Road.

=== Interim American coverage (1983-2011) ===
In 2008, when NBCSN was known as Versus and not yet under the same corporate umbrella as NBC, it aired the 96th Grey Cup.

The Canadian Football League entered into a much more generous contract with the America One television network that had run from 2001 through 2009. That contract allowed for the majority of CFL games to be televised in the United States, with America One syndicating the Canadian coverage (from TSN or, prior to 2008, CBC) primarily to regional sports networks. A number of factors led to America One not renewing their contract after the 2009 season. On July 1, 2010, NFL Network began airing live Canadian Football League games, again simulcasting TSN. This much more limited package did not include any games in August (during the NFL preseason), any playoff games, the Labour Day Classic (one of the Labour Day games was carried in 2011 but not the other), Thanksgiving Day Classic, or the Grey Cup. NFL Network aired Thursday games, three Saturday games in July, and then Friday night games beginning again in September (after ArenaBowl XXIII; NFL Network also held rights to the Arena Football League and aired a weekly game on Friday nights). NFL Network announced it would not renew its deal with the CFL on May 25, 2012.

=== NBCSN's coverage (2012-2013) ===
The package was picked up by NBCSN starting on Monday August 27, 2012 with 14 games total broadcast on NBC Sports Network including 9 regular season games (including both Labour Day Classic games) and all of the playoffs and Grey Cup. NBC renewed its deal with the CFL shortly before the 2013 regular season, but the deal scaled back the network's playoff coverage (the network will not air the first round games and will only air the conference finals on tape delay). The 2013 U.S. TV schedule featured 11 regular season games live (including the lone Labour Day Classic contest), three tape-delayed contests in October (including the displaced Toronto-Hamilton Thanksgiving Day Classic, which will air at midnight the Wednesday after), and the Grey Cup live.

In an oddity, NBCSN only owned the traditional television rights to the league, while another network owned the Internet rights; ESPN3 has carried CFL games on the Internet since 2008. (ESPN Inc., ESPN3's parent company, holds a minority stake in TSN.) The CFL granted exclusive broadcast and Internet rights to ESPN in a multinational, five-year deal prior to the 2014 season, ending NBCSN's involvement with the league until at least 2019.

== See also ==
- List of Grey Cup broadcasters
