= 1982 CFL season =

Canadian Football League season

- East champions: Toronto Argonauts
- West champions: Edmonton Eskimos

70th Grey Cup
- Date: 28 November 1982
- Champions: Edmonton Eskimos

CFL seasons
- ← 1981 1983 →

Canadian Football League team locations: West, East

The 1982 CFL season is considered to be the 29th season in modern-day Canadian football, although it is officially the 25th Canadian Football League season.

== CFL news in 1982 ==
After the 1981 season, the Montreal Alouettes folded. However, one day later in 1982 the CFL granted the city of Montreal a new franchise called the Concordes, which assumed the Alouettes' history and player contracts.

The 1982 Grey Cup game between the Edmonton Eskimos and the Toronto Argonauts attracted 7,862,000 television viewers, the largest television audience in the history of Canadian television.

NBC broadcast four CFL games in the United States over three weeks during the 1982 NFL players' strike.

Alcoholic beverages were sold at all CFL venues for the first time, after the Legislative Assembly of Ontario voted to lift the province's long-standing prohibition on alcohol at outdoor stadia shortly before the season began.

The Edmonton Eskimos won their fifth straight Grey Cup championship.

== Regular season standings ==
=== Final regular season standings ===
West Division
Pos	Team	Pld	W	L	T	PF	PA	PD	Pts	Div	Stk
1	Edmonton Eskimos (C, Q)	16	11	5	0	544	323	221	22	5–3	W1
2	Winnipeg Blue Bombers (Q)	16	11	5	0	444	352	92	22	5–3	L2
3	Calgary Stampeders (Q)	16	9	6	1	403	440	−37	19	4–4	W1
4	BC Lions	16	9	7	0	449	390	59	18	3–5	W1
5	Saskatchewan Roughriders	16	6	9	1	427	436	−9	13	3–5	L2

Source: "CFL.ca". Archived from the original on 14 July 2009.
(C) First round bye; (Q) Qualified for playoffs

East Division
Pos	Team	Pld	W	L	T	PF	PA	PD	Pts	Div	Stk
1	Toronto Argonauts (C, Q)	16	9	6	1	426	426	0	19	4–2	W2
2	Hamilton Tiger-Cats (Q)	16	8	7	1	396	401	−5	17	5–1	W1
3	Ottawa Rough Riders (Q)	16	5	11	0	267	518	−251	10	2–4	L1
4	Montreal Concordes	16	2	14	0	241	506	−265	4	1–5	L7

Source: "1982 Regular Season Standings". Archived from the original on 29 September 2010.
(C) First round bye; (Q) Qualified for playoffs

Edmonton and Toronto had first round byes.

== Grey Cup playoffs ==
The Edmonton Eskimos were the 1982 Grey Cup champions, defeating the Toronto Argonauts, 32–16, in front of their home crowd at Toronto's Exhibition Stadium. That was Edmonton's fifth-straight championship, becoming the CFL's most successful dynasty. The Eskimos' Warren Moon (QB) was named the Grey Cup's Most Valuable Player on Offence and Dave "Dr. Death" Fennell (DT) was named the Grey Cup's Most Valuable Player on Defence and was the Grey Cup's Most Valuable Canadian.

=== Playoff bracket ===
November 14: Division semifinals
East
E3	Ottawa Rough Riders	30
E2	Hamilton Tiger-Cats	20
West
W3	Calgary Stampeders	3
W2	Winnipeg Blue Bombers	24

November 21: Division finals
E3	Ottawa Rough Riders	7
E1	Toronto Argonauts	44
W2	Winnipeg Blue Bombers	21
W1	Edmonton Eskimos	24

November 28: 70th Grey Cup @ Exhibition Stadium – Toronto, Ontario
E1	Toronto Argonauts	16
W1	Edmonton Eskimos	32

== CFL leaders ==
- CFL passing leaders
- CFL rushing leaders
- CFL receiving leaders

== 1982 CFL All-Stars ==
=== Offense ===
- QB – Warren Moon, Edmonton Eskimos
- RB – Alvin "Skip" Walker, Ottawa Rough Riders
- RB – William Miller, Winnipeg Blue Bombers
- SB – Tom Scott, Edmonton Eskimos
- SB – Joey Walters, Saskatchewan Roughriders
- WR – Terry Greer, Toronto Argonauts
- WR – Keith Baker, Hamilton Tiger-Cats
- C – John Bonk, Winnipeg Blue Bombers
- OG – Val Belcher, Ottawa Rough Riders
- OG – Rudy Phillips, Ottawa Rough Riders
- OT – Bobby Thompson, Winnipeg Blue Bombers
- OT – Lloyd Fairbanks, Calgary Stampeders

=== Defense ===
- DT – Mike Samples, Saskatchewan Roughriders
- DT – John Helton, Winnipeg Blue Bombers
- DE – Nick Hebeler, BC Lions
- DE – Pete Catan, Winnipeg Blue Bombers
- LB – Danny Bass, Calgary Stampeders
- LB – James "Quick" Parker, Edmonton Eskimos
- LB – Ben Zambiasi, Hamilton Tiger-Cats
- DB – David Shaw, Hamilton Tiger-Cats
- DB – Ray Odums, Calgary Stampeders
- DB – Vince Phason, Winnipeg Blue Bombers
- DB – Fran McDermott, Saskatchewan Roughriders
- DB – Zac Henderson, Toronto Argonauts

=== Special teams ===
- P – Ken Clark, Saskatchewan Roughriders
- K – Dave Ridgway, Saskatchewan Roughriders

== 1982 Western All-Stars ==
=== Offence ===
- QB – Dieter Brock, Winnipeg Blue Bombers
- RB – James Sykes, Calgary Stampeders
- RB – William Miller, Winnipeg Blue Bombers
- SB – Tom Scott, Edmonton Eskimos
- SB – Joey Walters, Saskatchewan Roughriders
- WR – Mervyn Fernandez, BC Lions
- WR – Willie Armstead, Calgary Stampeders
- C – John Bonk, Winnipeg Blue Bombers
- OG – Nick Bastaja, Winnipeg Blue Bombers
- OG – Leo Blanchard, Edmonton Eskimos
- OG – Roger Aldag, Saskatchewan Roughriders
- OT – Bobby Thompson, Winnipeg Blue Bombers
- OT – Lloyd Fairbanks, Calgary Stampeders

=== Defence ===
- DT – Mike Samples, Saskatchewan Roughriders
- DT – John Helton, Winnipeg Blue Bombers
- DE – Nick Hebeler, BC Lions
- DE – Pete Catan, Winnipeg Blue Bombers
- LB – Danny Bass, Calgary Stampeders
- LB – James "Quick" Parker, Edmonton Eskimos
- LB – Glen Jackson, BC Lions
- DB – Joe Hollimon, Edmonton Eskimos
- DB – Ray Odums, Calgary Stampeders
- DB – Vince Phason, Winnipeg Blue Bombers
- DB – Fran McDermott, Saskatchewan Roughriders
- DB – Paul Bennett, Winnipeg Blue Bombers

=== Special teams ===
- P – Ken Clark, Saskatchewan Roughriders
- K – Dave Ridgway, Saskatchewan Roughriders

== 1982 Eastern All-Stars ==
=== Offence ===
- QB – Condredge Holloway, Toronto Argonauts
- RB – Alvin "Skip" Walker, Ottawa Rough Riders
- RB – Cedric Minter, Toronto Argonauts
- SB – Rocky DiPietro, Hamilton Tiger-Cats
- SB – Nick Arakgi, Montreal Concordes
- WR – Terry Greer, Toronto Argonauts
- WR – Keith Baker, Hamilton Tiger-Cats
- C – Henry Waszczuk, Hamilton Tiger-Cats
- OG – Val Belcher, Ottawa Rough Riders
- OG – Rudy Phillips, Ottawa Rough Riders
- OT – Ed Fulton, Hamilton Tiger-Cats
- OT – Doug Payton, Montreal Concordes

=== Defence ===
- DT – Gary Dulin, Ottawa Rough Riders
- DT – Glen Weir, Montreal Concordes
- DE – Doug Scott, Montreal Concordes
- DE – Greg Marshall, Ottawa Rough Riders
- LB – John Pointer, Toronto Argonauts
- LB – William Hampton, Montreal Concordes
- LB – Ben Zambiasi, Hamilton Tiger-Cats
- DB – David Shaw, Hamilton Tiger-Cats
- DB – Carl Brazley, Ottawa Rough Riders
- DB – Howard Fields, Hamilton Tiger-Cats
- DB – Mark Young, Montreal Concordes
- DB – Zac Henderson, Toronto Argonauts

=== Special teams ===
- P – Bernie Ruoff, Hamilton Tiger-Cats
- K – Gerry Organ, Ottawa Rough Riders

== 1982 CFL awards ==
- CFL's Most Outstanding Player Award – Condredge Holloway (QB), Toronto Argonauts
- CFL's Most Outstanding Canadian Award – Rocky DiPietro (SB), Hamilton Tiger-Cats
- CFL's Most Outstanding Defensive Player Award – James "Quick" Parker (LB), Edmonton Eskimos
- CFL's Most Outstanding Offensive Lineman Award – Rudy Phillips (OG), Ottawa Rough Riders
- CFL's Most Outstanding Rookie Award – Chris Isaac (QB), Ottawa Rough Riders
- CFLPA's Outstanding Community Service Award – David Boone (DE), Edmonton Eskimos
- CFL's Coach of the Year – Bob O'Billovich, Toronto Argonauts
