= 1982 Hamilton Tiger-Cats season =

Season of Canadian Football League team the Hamilton Tiger-Cats

- Head coach: Bud Riley
- Home stadium: Ivor Wynne Stadium

Results
- Record: 8–7–1
- Division place: 2nd, East
- Playoffs: Lost East Semi-Final
- Team MOP: Tom Clements
- Team MOC: Rocky DiPietro
- Team MOR: Jeff Arp

The 1982 Hamilton Tiger-Cats season was the 25th season for the team in the Canadian Football League (CFL) and their 33rd overall. The Tiger-Cats finished in second place in the East Division with an 8–7–1 record. They lost to the Ottawa Rough Riders in the East Semi-Final.

== Preseason ==
Week	Date	Opponent	Result	Record
A	June 12	vs. Ottawa Rough Riders	W 11–5	1–0
B	June 16	at Montreal Concordes	W 31–9	2–0
C	June 24	at Toronto Argonauts	L 24–34	2–1
D	June 30	vs. Toronto Argonauts	W 17–14	3–1

== Regular season ==
=== Season standings ===
East Division
Pos	Team	Pld	W	L	T	PF	PA	PD	Pts	Div	Stk
1	Toronto Argonauts (C, Q)	16	9	6	1	426	426	0	19	4–2	W2
2	Hamilton Tiger-Cats (Q)	16	8	7	1	396	401	−5	17	5–1	W1
3	Ottawa Rough Riders (Q)	16	5	11	0	267	518	−251	10	2–4	L1
4	Montreal Concordes	16	2	14	0	241	506	−265	4	1–5	L7

Source: "1982 Regular Season Standings". Archived from the original on 2010-09-29.
(C) First round bye; (Q) Qualified for playoffs

=== Season schedule ===
Week	Date	Opponent	Result	Record
1	July 10	at BC Lions	L 34–51	0–1
2	July 17	vs. Ottawa Rough Riders	W 20–14	1–1
3	July 24	at Winnipeg Blue Bombers	W 36–25	2–1
4	July 31	vs. Calgary Stampeders	L 12–30	2–2
5	Aug 6	at Montreal Concordes	L 10–21	2–3
6	Aug 13	vs. Toronto Argonauts	W 37–27	3–3
7	Aug 21	at Saskatchewan Roughriders	L 15–18	3–4
8	Bye			
9	Sept 6	vs. Montreal Concordes	W 28–9	4–4
10	Sept 10	at Toronto Argonauts	W 30–25	5–4
11	Sept 19	vs. Edmonton Eskimos	L 14–32	5–5
12	Bye			
13	Oct 3	at Ottawa Rough Riders	W 18–13	6–5
14	Oct 11	vs. Saskatchewan Roughriders	T 24–24	6–5–1
15	Oct 17	at Calgary Stampeders	L 48–55	6–6–1
16	Oct 24	vs. BC Lions	W 35–22	7–6–1
17	Oct 30	at Edmonton Eskimos	L 11–14	7–7–1
18	Nov 7	vs. Winnipeg Blue Bombers	W 24–21	8–7–1

== Postseason ==
=== Schedule ===
Game	Date	Opponent	Result
East Semi-Final	Nov 14	vs. Ottawa Rough Riders	L 20–30

== Roster ==
1982 Hamilton Tiger-Cats final roster
Quarterbacks: 2 Tom Clements; 7 Pete Gales; 8 Dave Marler; Running backs: 22 Mark Bragagnolo; 21 Rufus Crawford; 32 Dave Graffi; Wide receivers: 1 Keith Baker; 73 Ron Johnson; 70 Kerry Smith; 3 Steve Stapler; Tight ends: 23 Rocky Dipietro; 34 Steve Kearns; 15 Dave Purves	Offensive linemen: 63 Marv Allemang T; 53 Jeff Arp G; 51 Mark Coflin C/G; 54 Ross Francis G; 59 Ed Fulton T; 50 Henry Waszczuk C; 57 Elwin Worobec G/T; Defensive linemen: 66 Grover Covington DE; 79 Claude Mathews DT; 69 Jim Muller DE; 58 Dave Sauve DT; 61 Mike Walker DT	Linebackers: 47 Carm Carteri; 39 Ed Gataveckas; 36 John Priestner; 31 Ben Zambiasi; Defensive backs: 14 Gerald Bess; 29 M. L. Carter; 16 Howard Fields; 24 Hazen Henderson; 26 Mike McIntyre; 27 Leroy Paul; 37 David Shaw; 28 Felix Wright; Special teams: 10 Bernie Ruoff K/P; Italics indicate American players

== Awards and honours ==
- CFL's Most Outstanding Canadian Award – Rocky DiPietro (SB)
- Vince Scott was elected into the Canadian Football Hall of Fame as a Player on May 28, 1982.

=== 1982 All-Stars ===
- Keith Baker, Wide receiver
- Ben Zambiasi, Linebacker
- David Shaw, Defensive back
