= 1982 Winnipeg Blue Bombers season =

Canadian football team season

- General manager: Earl Lunsford
- Head coach: Ray Jauch
- Home stadium: Winnipeg Stadium

Results
- Record: 11–5
- Division place: 2nd, West
- Playoffs: Lost West Final

Uniform

The 1982 Winnipeg Blue Bombers finished in second place in the West Division with an 11–5 record. They appeared in the West Final but lost 24–21 to the Edmonton Eskimos.

== Offseason ==
=== CFL draft ===
Rd	Pick	Player	Position	School

== Preseason ==
Game	Date	Opponent	Results		Venue	Attendance
Game	Date	Opponent	Score	Record	Venue	Attendance
A	Wed, June 9	vs. Calgary Stampeders	W 22–0	1–0	Winnipeg Stadium	19,214
B	Wed, June 16	vs. BC Lions	W 25–11	2–0	Winnipeg Stadium	19,613
C	Sun, June 27	at Saskatchewan Roughriders	W 25–16	3–0	Taylor Field	24,376
D	Fri, July 2	at Edmonton Eskimos	L 8–16	3–1	Commonwealth Stadium	25,000

== Regular season ==
=== Standings ===
West Division
Pos	Team	Pld	W	L	T	PF	PA	PD	Pts	Div	Stk
1	Edmonton Eskimos (C, Q)	16	11	5	0	544	323	221	22	5–3	W1
2	Winnipeg Blue Bombers (Q)	16	11	5	0	444	352	92	22	5–3	L2
3	Calgary Stampeders (Q)	16	9	6	1	403	440	−37	19	4–4	W1
4	BC Lions	16	9	7	0	449	390	59	18	3–5	W1
5	Saskatchewan Roughriders	16	6	9	1	427	436	−9	13	3–5	L2

Source: "CFL.ca". Archived from the original on 2009-07-14.
(C) First round bye; (Q) Qualified for playoffs

=== Schedule ===
Week	Game	Date	Opponent	Results		Venue	Attendance
Week	Game	Date	Opponent	Score	Record	Venue	Attendance
1	1	Fri, July 9	vs. Saskatchewan Roughriders	W 31–21	1–0	Winnipeg Stadium	28,342
2	2	Fri, July 16	at Montreal Concordes	W 36–0	2–0	Olympic Stadium	14,700
3	3	Sat, July 24	vs. Hamilton Tiger-Cats	L 25–36	2–1	Winnipeg Stadium	27,919
4	4	Sat, Aug 1	at Edmonton Eskimos	W 32–26	3–1	Commonwealth Stadium	57,596
5	5	Sat, Aug 8	vs. BC Lions	W 29–16	4–1	Winnipeg Stadium	32,946
6	Bye						
7	6	Fri, Aug 20	at Calgary Stampeders	W 35–4	5–1	McMahon Stadium	34,951
8	7	Sat, Aug 28	vs. Ottawa Rough Riders	W 27–20	6–1	Winnipeg Stadium	25,904
9	8	Sun, Sept 5	at Saskatchewan Roughriders	W 36–35	7–1	Taylor Field	30,621
10	9	Sat, Sept 11	vs. Calgary Stampeders	L 11–15	7–2	Winnipeg Stadium	30,119
11	10	Sat, Sept 18	at Ottawa Rough Riders	L 28–38	7–3	Lansdowne Park	17,227
12	11	Sat, Sept 25	vs. Montreal Concordes	W 19–16	8–3	Winnipeg Stadium	24,462
13	12	Sat, Oct 2	at BC Lions	W 29–19	9–3	Empire Stadium	31,867
14	13	Mon, Oct 11	vs. Toronto Argonauts	W 39–35	10–3	Winnipeg Stadium	26,129
15	14	Sun, Oct 17	at Toronto Argonauts	W 29–16	11–3	Exhibition Stadium	42,830
16	15	Sat, Oct 23	vs. Edmonton Eskimos	L 17–33	11–4	Winnipeg Stadium	32,946
17	16	Sun, Nov 7	at Hamilton Tiger-Cats	L 21–24	11–5	Ivor Wynne Stadium	18,162

== Playoffs ==
=== West Semi-Final ===
Team	Q1	Q2	Q3	Q4	Total
Calgary Stampeders	0	3	0	0	3
Winnipeg Blue Bombers	0	21	0	3	24

=== West Final ===
Team	Q1	Q2	Q3	Q4	Total
Winnipeg Blue Bombers	7	2	3	9	21
Edmonton Eskimos	3	14	0	7	24

== Roster ==
1982 Winnipeg Blue Bombers final roster
Quarterbacks: 5 Dieter Brock; 7 Mark Jackson; Running backs: 35 Kevin Cole; 29 Craig Ellis; 30 Dan Huclack; 32 Milson Jones; 33 William Miller; Receivers: 34 Eugene Goodlow; 70 Mike Holmes; 31 Rick House; 80 Nate Johnson; 73 John Konihowski; 71 Joe Poplawski	Offensive linemen: 65 Nick Bastaja G; 59 Lyle Bauer G/C; 43 John Bonk C; 58 Derek Faggiani G/T; 56 Franky Smith T; 51 Roger Taylor T; 61 Bobby Thompson T; 63 Chris Walby G/T; Defensive linemen: 53 Pete Catan DE; 99 John Helton DT; 64 Doug MacIver DT/DE; 79 Stan Mikawos DT; 55 Tony Norman DE	Linebackers: 52 Aaron Brown; 76 Ken Ciancone; 72 Leo Ezerins; 54 Vernon Pahl; 38 David Pearson; Defensive backs: 27 Paul Bennett; 24 Gregg Butler; 14 Scott Flagel; 9 Vince Phason; 8 Reggie Pierson; 28 Wylie Turner; 20 Charles Williams	Special teams: 6 Bob Cameron P; 3 Trevor Kennerd K; Injured list: 57 James Reed LB; 50 Willie Thomas G; Italics indicate International player
