= 1982 Montreal Concordes season =

Canadian football team season

- Owner: Charles Bronfman
- General manager: Sam Etcheverry
- Head coach: Joe Galat
- Home stadium: Olympic Stadium

Results
- Record: 2–14
- Division place: 4th, East
- Playoffs: Did not qualify

The 1982 Montreal Concordes finished the season in fourth place in the East Division with a 2–14 record and missed the playoffs. After the Montreal Alouettes folded after the 1981 season, the CFL awarded Expos owner Charles Bronfman a replacement franchise, the Montreal Concordes. Bronfman retained the Alouettes' history and records, along with the CFL rights to the Alouettes players.

== Preseason ==
Game	Date	Opponent	Results		Venue	Attendance
Game	Date	Opponent	Score	Record	Venue	Attendance
A	June 10	at Toronto Argonauts	L 11–20	0–1	Exhibition Stadium	26,329
B	June 16	vs. Hamilton Tiger-Cats	L 9–31	0–2	Olympic Stadium	6,749
C	June 22	vs. Ottawa Rough Riders	L 13–26	0–3	Olympic Stadium	7,665
D	June 29	at Ottawa Rough Riders	L 13–31	0–4	Lansdowne Park	14,997

== Regular season ==
=== Standings ===
East Division
Pos	Team	Pld	W	L	T	PF	PA	PD	Pts	Div	Stk
1	Toronto Argonauts (C, Q)	16	9	6	1	426	426	0	19	4–2	W2
2	Hamilton Tiger-Cats (Q)	16	8	7	1	396	401	−5	17	5–1	W1
3	Ottawa Rough Riders (Q)	16	5	11	0	267	518	−251	10	2–4	L1
4	Montreal Concordes	16	2	14	0	241	506	−265	4	1–5	L7

Source: "1982 Regular Season Standings". Archived from the original on 2010-09-29.
(C) First round bye; (Q) Qualified for playoffs

=== Schedule ===
Week	Game	Date	Opponent	Results		Venue	Attendance
Week	Game	Date	Opponent	Score	Record	Venue	Attendance
1	Bye						
2	1	July 16	vs. Winnipeg Blue Bombers	L 0–36	0–1	Olympic Stadium	14,700
3	2	July 23	at Toronto Argonauts	L 13–16	0–2	Exhibition Stadium	31,875
4	3	July 29	at Ottawa Rough Riders	L 5–55	0–3	Lansdowne Park	18,991
5	4	Aug 6	vs. Hamilton Tiger-Cats	W 21–10	1–3	Olympic Stadium	17,762
6	5	Aug 15	at Edmonton Eskimos	L 8–46	1–4	Commonwealth Stadium	56,354
7	6	Aug 22	vs. BC Lions	L 9–45	1–5	Olympic Stadium	15,208
8	7	Aug 27	vs. Calgary Stampeders	L 30–31	1–6	Olympic Stadium	12,268
9	8	Sept 6	at Hamilton Tiger-Cats	L 9–28	1–7	Ivor Wynne Stadium	17,370
10	9	Sept 12	vs. Saskatchewan Roughriders	W 16–13	2–7	Olympic Stadium	14,111
11	10	Bye					
12	10	Sept 25	at Winnipeg Blue Bombers	L 16–19	2–8	Winnipeg Stadium	24,462
13	11	Oct 2	vs. Toronto Argonauts	L 9–25	2–9	Olympic Stadium	15,622
14	13	Oct 9	at Calgary Stampeders	L 24–34	2–10	McMahon Stadium	24,599
15	13	Oct 16	vs. Edmonton Eskimos	L 39–53	2–11	Olympic Stadium	16,375
16	14	Oct 24	at Saskatchewan Roughriders	L 20–25	2–12	Taylor Field	26,470
17	15	Oct 31	vs. Ottawa Rough Riders	L 32–34	2–13	Olympic Stadium	17,179
18	16	Nov 6	at BC Lions	L 16–32	2–14	Empire Stadium	15,071

== Roster ==
1982 Montreal Concordes final roster
Quarterbacks: 19 Johnny Evans P; 14 John Rogan; 16 Luc Tousignant; Running backs: 22 Lester Brown; 35 Denny Ferdinand; 26 Marc Lacelle; 42 Peter Martell; 33 Chuck McMann; Wide receivers: 84 Howard Ballage; 2 Brian DeRoo; 89 Peter Eshenko; 9 Pete Harvey; 1 Mike Rodrigue; 88 Dom Vetro	Tight ends: 79 Nick Arakgi; Offensive linemen: 68 John Foubert G/T; 65 Miles Gorrell T; 50 Norm Hopely T/G; 57 Gord Judges G; 41 Glenn Keeble C; 61 Doug Payton T; 53 Rob Smith G/T; Defensive linemen: 76 Gene Belliveau DT; 71 Joe Costello DE; 70 Doug Scott DE; 64 Glen Weir DT; 55 James Zachery DE/DT	Linebackers: 52 Delbert Fowler; 72 Kurt Garl; 62 Bill Hampton; 51 Frank Kosec; 47 George Martin; 36 John Palazeti; 44 John Prassas; Defensive backs: 24 Charles Cornelius; 25 Larry Friday; 6 Phil Jones; 32 Alfonzo McMillian; 7 Ken Miller; 30 Vince Skillings; 8 Mark Young; 17 Preston Young	Special teams: 11 Don Sweet K/P; Injured list: 75 Keith Gary DE; 20 David Overstreet RB; 21 Terry Porter DB; Italics indicate American players
