= 1982 Toronto Argonauts season =

CFL team season

- Head coach: Bob O'Billovich
- Home stadium: Exhibition Stadium

Results
- Record: 9–6–1
- Division place: 1st, East
- Playoffs: Lost Grey Cup

Uniform

The 1982 Toronto Argonauts finished in first place in the East Division with a 9–6–1 record. They appeared in the 70th Grey Cup vs the Edmonton Eskimos but were soundly beaten 32–16.

== Offseason ==
The Toronto Argonauts drafted the following players in the 1982 CFL draft.

Round	Pick	Player	Position	School
T	T	Geoff Townsend	TB	Boston College
T	T	Stephen Decol	DT	Simon Fraser
1	1	Mike Kirkley	RB	Western Ontario
1	2	Greg Holmes	WR	Carroll (WI)
1	6	Tony Antvnovic	T	Simon Fraser
1	7	Chris Schultz	T	Arizona
3	20	Marc Lemery	LB	McGill

== Preseason ==
Game	Date	Opponent	Results		Venue	Attendance
Game	Date	Opponent	Score	Record	Venue	Attendance
A	Thu, June 10	vs. Montreal Concordes	W 20–11	1–0	Exhibition Stadium	26,329
B	Thu, June 17	at Ottawa Rough Riders	W 26–10	2–0	Lansdowne Park	15,075
C	Thu, June 24	vs. Hamilton Tiger-Cats	W 34–24	3–0	Exhibition Stadium	27,311
D	Wed, June 30	at Hamilton Tiger-Cats	L 14–17	3–1	Ivor Wynne Stadium	15,263

== Regular season ==
=== Standings ===
East Division
Pos	Team	Pld	W	L	T	PF	PA	PD	Pts	Div	Stk
1	Toronto Argonauts (C, Q)	16	9	6	1	426	426	0	19	4–2	W2
2	Hamilton Tiger-Cats (Q)	16	8	7	1	396	401	−5	17	5–1	W1
3	Ottawa Rough Riders (Q)	16	5	11	0	267	518	−251	10	2–4	L1
4	Montreal Concordes	16	2	14	0	241	506	−265	4	1–5	L7

Source: "1982 Regular Season Standings". Archived from the original on 2010-09-29.
(C) First round bye; (Q) Qualified for playoffs

=== Schedule ===
Week	Game	Date	Opponent	Results		Venue	Attendance
Week	Game	Date	Opponent	Score	Record	Venue	Attendance
1	1	Thu, July 8	vs. Calgary Stampeders	T 24–24	0–0–1	Exhibition Stadium	32,760
2	2	Sat, July 17	at Edmonton Eskimos	L 12–31	0–1–1	Commonwealth Stadium	55,974
3	3	Fri, July 23	vs. Montreal Concordes	W 16–13	1–1–1	Exhibition Stadium	31,875
4	4	Fri, July 30	at Saskatchewan Roughriders	W 44–22	2–1–1	Taylor Field	28,076
5	5	Sat, Aug 7	vs. Edmonton Eskimos	W 30–22	3–1–1	Exhibition Stadium	37,985
6	6	Fri, Aug 13	at Hamilton Tiger-Cats	L 27–37	3–2–1	Ivor Wynne Stadium	28,799
7	7	Thu, Aug 19	vs. Ottawa Rough Riders	W 35–25	4–2–1	Exhibition Stadium	38,258
8	8	Sat, Aug 28	at BC Lions	W 20–19	5–2–1	Empire Stadium	27,285
9	Bye						
10	9	Fri, Sept 10	vs. Hamilton Tiger-Cats	L 25–30	5–3–1	Exhibition Stadium	52,521
11	10	Fri, Sept 17	at Calgary Stampeders	W 34–30	6–3–1	McMahon Stadium	34,271
12	11	Sun, Sept 26	vs. BC Lions	L 14–46	6–4–1	Exhibition Stadium	40,250
13	12	Sat, Oct 2	at Montreal Concordes	W 25–9	7–4–1	Olympic Stadium	15,622
14	13	Mon, Oct 11	at Winnipeg Blue Bombers	L 35–39	7–5–1	Winnipeg Stadium	26,129
15	14	Sun, Oct 17	vs. Winnipeg Blue Bombers	L 16–29	7–6–1	Exhibition Stadium	42,830
16	Bye						
17	15	Sat, Oct 30	vs. Saskatchewan Roughriders	W 41–36	8–6–1	Exhibition Stadium	30,927
18	16	Sat, Nov 6	at Ottawa Rough Riders	W 28–14	9–6–1	Lansdowne Park	25,868

== Postseason ==
Round	Date	Opponent	Results		Venue	Attendance
Round	Date	Opponent	Score	Record	Venue	Attendance
East Final	Sun, Nov 21	vs. Ottawa Rough Riders	W 44–7	1–0	Exhibition Stadium	43,432
Grey Cup	Sun, Nov 28	vs. Edmonton Eskimos	L 16–32	1–1	Exhibition Stadium	54,741

=== Grey Cup ===
Team	Q1	Q2	Q3	Q4	Total
Toronto Argonauts	7	7	0	2	16
Edmonton Eskimos	3	17	6	6	32

== Roster ==
1982 Toronto Argonauts final roster
**Quarterbacks**: 17 Joe Barnes; 7 Condredge Holloway; **Running backs**: 34 Bob Bronk; 27 Jan Carinci; 23 John Lowe; 20 Cedric Minter; **Receivers**: 10 Terry Greer; 71 Greg Holmes; 15 Scott McGhee; 32 Dave Newman; 25 Paul Pearson; 19 Emanuel Tolbert; 30 Geoff Townsend	**Offensive linemen**: 54 Tony Antunovic G/C; 69 Dan Ferrone G; 44 Mike Hameluck C/G; 63 John Malinosky T; 59 Roland Mangold G; 51 Warner Miles G/T; 53 Doug Smith C; 50 Tom Trifaux T; **Defensive linemen**: 75 Steve Del Col DE; 64 Leon Lyszkiewicz DT; 76 Rick Mohr DE; 79 Rusty Olsen DE/DT; 58 Earl Wilson DT	**Linebackers**: 41 Tim Berryman; 35 Gord Elser; 70 Ed Jackson; 36 Don Moen; 37 John Pointer; **Defensive backs**: 26 Steve Ackroyd; 28 Leo Gray; 24 Jo Jo Heath; 31 Zac Henderson; 6 Donovan Rose; 29 Merv Walker; 13 Darrell Wilson	**Special teams**: 12 Dean Dorsey K/P; **Injured list**: -- Ken Johnson QB; 9 Sam Johnson DB; Italics indicate International player **Bold** indicates Global player

== Awards and honours ==
- CFL's Most Outstanding Player Award – Condredge Holloway (QB), Toronto Argonauts
- CFL's Coach of the Year – Bob O'Billovich, Toronto Argonauts

=== 1982 CFL All-Stars ===
- Terry Greer, Wide Receiver
- Zac Henderson, Defensive Back

=== 1982 Eastern All-Stars ===
- QB – Condredge Holloway, Toronto Argonauts
- RB – Cedric Minter, Toronto Argonauts
- WR – Terry Greer, Toronto Argonauts
- LB – John Pointer, Toronto Argonauts
- DB – Zac Henderson, Toronto Argonauts
