= 1982 Ottawa Rough Riders season =

Canadian football team season

- Owner: Allan Waters
- General manager: Jake Dunlap
- Head coach: George Brancato
- Home stadium: Lansdowne Park

Results
- Record: 5–11
- Division place: 3rd, East
- Playoffs: Lost in East Final

Uniform

The 1982 Ottawa Rough Riders finished the season in third place in the East Division with a 5–11 record. After winning the East-Semi Final playoff game against the Hamilton Tiger-Cats, the Riders lost to the Toronto Argonauts in the East Final. This season marked the last time an Ottawa football franchise won a playoff game until 2015, when the second-year Redblacks won two playoff games.

== Offseason ==
=== CFL draft ===
Rd	Pick	Player	Position	School
0	0	Mark Seale	DT	Richmond
0	0	Kevin Dalliday	OG/DT	Carleton
0	0	Ron St. Poulton	DB	McGill
3	26	Terry Cahill	DB	East Stroudsburg State
4	35	Bruce Milks	DB	South Arkansas
5	44	Terry Elik	LB	Simon Fraser
6	53	Greg Clarke	OT	British Columbia

=== Preseason ===
Game	Date	Opponent	Results		Venue	Attendance
Game	Date	Opponent	Score	Record	Venue	Attendance
A	June 12	at Hamilton Tiger-Cats	L 5–11	0–1		12,906
B	June 17	vs. Toronto Argonauts	L 10–26	0–2		15,075
C	June 22	at Montreal Concordes	W 26–13	1–2		7,665
D	June 29	vs. Montreal Concordes	W 31–13	2–2		14,997

== Regular season ==
=== Standings ===
East Division
Pos	Team	Pld	W	L	T	PF	PA	PD	Pts	Div	Stk
1	Toronto Argonauts (C, Q)	16	9	6	1	426	426	0	19	4–2	W2
2	Hamilton Tiger-Cats (Q)	16	8	7	1	396	401	−5	17	5–1	W1
3	Ottawa Rough Riders (Q)	16	5	11	0	267	518	−251	10	2–4	L1
4	Montreal Concordes	16	2	14	0	241	506	−265	4	1–5	L7

Source: "1982 Regular Season Standings". Archived from the original on 2010-09-29.
(C) First round bye; (Q) Qualified for playoffs

=== Schedule ===
Week	Game	Date	Opponent	Results		Venue	Attendance
Week	Game	Date	Opponent	Score	Record	Venue	Attendance
1	1	July 11	vs. Edmonton Eskimos	L 7–55	0–1		21,435
2	2	July 17	at Hamilton Tiger-Cats	L 14–20	0–2		15,860
3	Bye						
4	3	July 29	vs. Montreal Concordes	W 55–5	1–2		18,991
5	4	Aug 6	at Calgary Stampeders	L 19–30	1–3		29,038
6	5	Aug 12	vs. Saskatchewan Roughriders	L 19–26	1–4		21,455
7	6	Aug 19	at Toronto Argonauts	L 25–35	1–5		38,258
8	7	Aug 28	at Winnipeg Blue Bombers	L 20–27	1–6		25,904
9	8	Sept 3	vs. BC Lions	L 13–45	1–7		20,609
10	9	Sept 12	vs. Edmonton Eskimos	L 11–47	1–8		54,622
11	10	Sept 18	vs. Winnipeg Blue Bombers	W 38–28	2–8		17,227
12	11	Sept 24	at Saskatchewan Roughriders	W 30–19	3–8		27,601
13	12	Oct 3	vs. Hamilton Tiger-Cats	L 13–18	3–9		23,670
14	Bye						
15	13	Oct 16	at BC Lions	L 22–28	3–10		20,068
16	14	Oct 23	vs. Calgary Stampeders	W 42–19	4–10		18,748
17	15	Oct 31	at Montreal Concordes	W 34–32	5–10		17,179
18	16	Nov 6	vs. Toronto Argonauts	L 14–28	5–11		25,868

== Postseason ==
Round	Date	Opponent	Results		Venue	Attendance
Round	Date	Opponent	Score	Record	Venue	Attendance
East Semi-Final	Nov 14	at Hamilton Tiger-Cats	W 30–20	1–0		20,087
East Final	Nov 21	at Toronto Argonauts	L 7–44	1–1		44,432

== Roster ==
1982 Ottawa Rough Riders final roster
Quarterbacks: 8 Jordan Case; 4 Chris Isaac; 2 Kevin Starkey; Running backs: 39 Maurice Doyle; 26 Mike Horton; 24 John Park; 32 Jim Reid; 33 Skip Walker; Wide receivers: 18 Jeff Avery; 31 Mike Collymore; 3 Kelvin Kirk; 10 Donnie Little; 13 Carl Powell; 23 Pete Stenerson; 14 Pat Stoqua; 1 Bruce Walker	Offensive linemen: 54 Ian Beckstead T; 68 Val Belcher G; 64 Tim Hook G; 67 Rudy Phillips G; 50 Kevin Powell T; 56 Bob Stephen C/G; 55 Larry Tittley C; Defensive linemen: 69 Gary Dulin DT; 63 Randy Fournier DE; 66 Greg Marshall DT; 73 Jim Piaskoski DE; 74 Mark Seale DT/DE; 61 Doug Seymour DE; 59 Jack Williams DT	Linebackers: 76 John Glassford; 42 Mike Graffi; 43 William Mitchell; 75 Rick Sowieta; Defensive backs: 25 Ricky Barden; 7 Carl Brazley; 28 Dale Getty; 15 Billy Hardee; 38 Charles Johnson; 9 Ricky Ray; 27 John Sutton; Special teams: 71 Gerry Organ K/P	Injured list: 53 Mike Peerman LB; Reserve list: 6 J. C. Watts QB; Italics indicate International player

== Awards and honours ==
=== CFL All-Stars ===
- RB – Alvin "Skip" Walker
- OG – Val Belcher
- OG – Rudy Phillips

=== Eastern All-Stars ===
- RB – Alvin "Skip" Walker
- OG – Val Belcher
- OG – Rudy Phillips
- DT – Gary Dulin
- DE – Greg Marshall
- DB – Carl Brazley
- K – Gerry Organ
