= Leo Gray =

American football player (born 1957)

No. 28
- Position: Cornerback

Personal information
- Born: January 8, 1957 (age 69); Los Angeles, California, U.S.
- Listed height: 5 ft 11 in (1.80 m)
- Listed weight: 175 lb (79 kg)

Career information
- High school: Mt. Carmel (San Diego, California)
- College: Los Angeles Harbor (1975); Los Angeles Southwest (1976); UNLV (1977–1978)

Career history
- Dallas Cowboys (1979)*; Oakland Raiders (1980–1981)*; BC Lions (1982)*; Toronto Argonauts (1982–1983); Saskatchewan Roughriders (1983)*; Los Angeles Express (1984)*; Saskatchewan Roughriders (1984)*
- * Offseason or practice squad member only

Awards and highlights
- Super Bowl champion (XV)

Career CFL statistics
- Games played: 9
- Receptions: 3
- Receiving yards: 67
- Receiving touchdowns: 1

Leonardo Bernard Gray (born January 8, 1957) is an American former professional football cornerback who played in the Canadian Football League (CFL) for the Toronto Argonauts. He played college football for the Los Angeles Harbor Seahawks, Los Angeles Southwest Cougars and UNLV Rebels. Gray also had stints in the National Football League (NFL) for the Dallas Cowboys and Oakland Raiders.

== Early life ==
Gray was born on January 13, 1968, in Los Angeles, California. He attended Mt. Carmel High School in San Diego, California.

== College career ==
Gray played college football for the Los Angeles Harbor Seahawks in 1975, Los Angeles Southwest Cougars in 1976 and UNLV Rebels from 1977 to 1978. At UNLV, he was a two-year letterman at wide receiver.

== Professional career ==
=== Dallas Cowboys ===
After going unselected in the 1979 NFL draft, Gray signed with the Dallas Cowboys as an undrafted free agent. On July 15, he was released by the team.

=== Oakland Raiders ===
During the 1980 offseason, Gray signed with Oakland Raiders. On August 19, he was placed on the injured reserve with a rib injury where he remained as the team won Super Bowl XV. On August 18, 1981, Gray was released by the Raiders.

=== BC Lions ===
On August 29, 1981, Gray signed with the BC Lions of the Canadian Football League (CFL). On April 12, 1982, he re-signed with the team. On June 19, Gray was waived.

=== Toronto Argonauts ===
On June 21, 1982, Gray was claimed off waivers by the Toronto Argonauts. He played in nine games, primarily as a cornerback but lined up at wide receiver against the Ottawa Rough Riders, catching three passes for 67 yards and one touchdown. On May 17, 1983, Gray was re-signed by the team.

=== Saskatchewan Roughriders (first stint) ===
On June 21, 1983, Gray was traded to the Saskatchewan Roughriders with John Lowe in exchange for Marcellus Greene and Lyall Woznesensky. On July 3, he was released by the team.

=== Los Angeles Express ===
On January 18, 1984, Gray was signed by the Los Angeles Express of the United States Football League (USFL). On February 6, he was released by the team.

=== Saskatchewan Roughriders (second stint) ===
On March 13, 1984, Gray was signed again by the Saskatchewan Roughriders. On June 22, he was released.
