= Nick Hebeler =

Canadian gridiron football player (born 1957)

Profile
- Position: Defensive end

Personal information
- Born: July 18, 1957 (age 69); Vancouver, British Columbia, Canada

Career information
- University: Simon Fraser
- CFL draft: 1979

Career history
- 1979–1985: BC Lions
- 1986–1987: Saskatchewan Roughriders

Awards and highlights
- Grey Cup champion (1985); CFL All-Star (1982); CFL West All-Star (1982); BC Lions lineman of the year, defensive player of the year 1981 and 1982.

Career CFL statistics
- Games played: 113
- Sacks: 57
- Interceptions: 1

Nick Hebeler (born July 18, 1957) is a Canadian former professional football defensive lineman who played nine years in the Canadian Football League (CFL), for the BC Lions from 1979 to 1985 and the Saskatchewan Roughriders in 1986 and 1987.

== University career ==
Hebeler played college football at Simon Fraser University.

== Professional career ==
Hebeler played 86 games for the B.C. Lions and recorded 68.5 sacks during that time. He was a part of the 1985 Lions' Grey Cup championship team. Hebeler was voted a member of both the 25 and 50 year anniversary B.C. Lions dream teams, celebrating the top players in the history of the franchise.

== Post-playing career ==
He now runs a respite program for autistic and mentally challenged youth. He lives with his wife and their twins in Maple Ridge, BC.
