= Vince Phason =

American gridiron football player (1953–2018)

Profile
- Position: Defensive back

Personal information
- Born: February 2, 1953; Denver, Colorado, U.S.
- Died: September 5, 2018 (aged 65); Denver, Colorado, U.S.

Career information
- College: Arizona
- NFL draft: 1975: 11th round, 267th overall pick

Career history
- 1975: Edmonton Eskimos
- 1975: BC Lions
- 1976–1982: Winnipeg Blue Bombers
- 1983–1985: Montreal Concordes

Awards and highlights
- CFL All-Star (1982); Soka Sports award

Vincent James Phason (February 2, 1953 – September 5, 2018) was an American professional football player who played as a defensive back who played from 1975 to 1985 in the Canadian Football League (CFL). He was a CFL All-Star in 1982. Phason was drafted 267th overall in the 11th round of the 1975 NFL Draft by the San Diego Chargers out of the University of Arizona. His football career eventually took him to Canada and the Winnipeg Blue Bombers of the CFL. He also played for the BC Lions, Edmonton Eskimos and the Montreal Concordes. Phason was paralyzed from the chest down in a November 1998 automobile accident. Seven months after being released from hospital Phason was back coaching high school football. He died on September 5, 2018, at a hospital in Denver.
