= 1982 BC Lions season =

Canadian football team season

- General manager: Bob Ackles
- President: Paul Higgins
- Head coach: Vic Rapp
- Home stadium: Empire Stadium

Results
- Record: 9–7
- Division place: 4th, West
- Playoffs: did not qualify

The 1982 BC Lions finished in fourth place in the West Division with a 9–7 record. Despite the winning record, they still failed to make the playoffs.

Vic Rapp and the coaching staff were fired at the end of the season.

Rookie receiver Merv Fernandez was the runner-up in the Schenley Rookie of the Year award voting.

The final game at Empire Stadium was played on November 6 against Montreal.

Willie Fleming was inducted into the Football Hall of Fame.

== Offseason ==
=== CFL draft ===
| Round | Pick | Player | Position | School |
|---|---|---|---|---|
| T | T | Dennis Guevin | Tackle | Simon Fraser |
| T | T | Gerald Roper | Guard | Arizona |
| 1 | 5 | Bernie Glier | Defensive back | UBC |
| 1 | 8 | Troy Ciochetti | Wide receiver | Alberta |
| 2 | 14 | Don Moen | Defensive back | UBC |
| 3 | 23 | Ryan Potter | Running back | Western Ontario |
| 3 | 25 | Bernie Jolette | Linebacker | Ottawa |
| 4 | 28 | David Singh | Running back | UBC |
| 4 | 32 | Dave Leuty | Wide receiver | Western Ontario |
| 5 | 41 | Tony Prencipe | Linebacker | Manitoba |
| 6 | 50 | Matt Kavanaugh | Centre | Simon Fraser |

== Preseason ==
| Game | Date | Opponent | Results | | Venue | Attendance |
| Game | Date | Opponent | Score | Record | Venue | Attendance |
|---|---|---|---|---|---|---|
| A | Thu, June 10 | vs. Edmonton Eskimos | L 19–22 | 0–1 | Empire Stadium | 19,392 |
| B | Wed, June 16 | at Winnipeg Blue Bombers | L 11–25 | 0–2 | Winnipeg Stadium | 19,613 |
| C | Tue, June 22 | at Saskatchewan Roughriders | W 43–39 | 1–2 | Empire Stadium | 19,488 |
| D | Tue, June 29 | at Calgary Stampeders | L 22–23 | 1–3 | McMahon Stadium | 24,053 |

== Regular season ==
=== Season standings ===
West Division
| Pos | Team | Pld | W | L | T | PF | PA | PD | Pts | Div | Stk |
|---|---|---|---|---|---|---|---|---|---|---|---|
| 1 | Edmonton Eskimos (C, Q) | 16 | 11 | 5 | 0 | 544 | 323 | 221 | 22 | 5–3 | W1 |
| 2 | Winnipeg Blue Bombers (Q) | 16 | 11 | 5 | 0 | 444 | 352 | 92 | 22 | 5–3 | L2 |
| 3 | Calgary Stampeders (Q) | 16 | 9 | 6 | 1 | 403 | 440 | −37 | 19 | 4–4 | W1 |
| 4 | BC Lions | 16 | 9 | 7 | 0 | 449 | 390 | 59 | 18 | 3–5 | W1 |
| 5 | Saskatchewan Roughriders | 16 | 6 | 9 | 1 | 427 | 436 | −9 | 13 | 3–5 | L2 |

Source: "CFL.ca". Archived from the original on 2009-07-14.
(C) First round bye; (Q) Qualified for playoffs

=== Season schedule ===
| Week | Game | Date | Opponent | Results | | Venue | Attendance |
| Week | Game | Date | Opponent | Score | Record | Venue | Attendance |
|---|---|---|---|---|---|---|---|
| 1 | 1 | Sat, July 10 | vs. Hamilton Tiger-Cats | W 51–34 | 1–0 | Empire Stadium | 23,389 |
| 2 | 2 | Sun, July 18 | at Saskatchewan Roughriders | W 26–24 | 2–0 | Taylor Field | 27,534 |
| 3 | 3 | Sun, July 25 | vs. Edmonton Eskimos | W 38–28 | 3–0 | Empire Stadium | 28,329 |
| 4 | Bye | | | | | | |
| 5 | 4 | Sun, Aug 8 | at Winnipeg Blue Bombers | L 16–29 | 3–1 | Winnipeg Stadium | 32,946 |
| 6 | 5 | Sat, Aug 14 | vs. Calgary Stampeders | L 8–30 | 3–2 | Empire Stadium | 26,184 |
| 7 | 6 | Sun, Aug 22 | at Montreal Concordes | W 45–9 | 4–2 | Olympic Stadium | 15,208 |
| 8 | 7 | Sat, Aug 28 | vs. Toronto Argonauts | 19–20 | 4–3 | Empire Stadium | 27,285 |
| 9 | 8 | Fri, Sept 3 | at Ottawa Rough Riders | W 45–13 | 5–3 | Lansdowne Park | 20,609 |
| 10 | Bye | | | | | | |
| 11 | 9 | Sat, Sept 18 | vs. Saskatchewan Roughriders | W 36–32 | 6–3 | Empire Stadium | 28,523 |
| 12 | 10 | Sun, Sept 26 | at Toronto Argonauts | W 46–14 | 7–3 | Exhibition Stadium | 40,250 |
| 13 | 11 | Sat, Oct 2 | vs. Winnipeg Blue Bombers | L 19–29 | 7–4 | Empire Stadium | 31,867 |
| 14 | 12 | Sun, Oct 10 | at Edmonton Eskimos | L 1–30 | 7–5 | Commonwealth Stadium | 59,979 |
| 15 | 13 | Sat, Oct 16 | vs. Ottawa Rough Riders | W 28–22 | 8–5 | Empire Stadium | 20,068 |
| 16 | 14 | Sun, Oct 24 | at Hamilton Tiger-Cats | L 22–35 | 8–6 | Ivor Wynne Stadium | 16,275 |
| 17 | 15 | Sun, Oct 31 | at Calgary Stampeders | L 19–25 | 8–7 | McMahon Stadium | 31,980 |
| 18 | 16 | Sat, Nov 6 | vs. Montreal Concordes | W 32–16 | 9–7 | Empire Stadium | 15,071 |

== Roster ==
1982 BC Lions final roster
| Quarterbacks: 9 Roy Dewalt; 12 John Fourcade; 6 Joe Paopao; Running backs: 11 Larry Key; 33 Ryan Potter; 19 Don Taylor; 20 John Henry White; Wide receivers: 36 Terry Bailey; 24 Mervyn Fernandez; 21 John Pankratz; 23 Mike Washburn; Tight ends: 7 Ricky Ellis; 8 Harry Holt K | Offensive linemen: 68 John Blain T; 67 Dennis Guevin T; 62 Donnie Hickman T/G; 54 Glenn Leonhard G; 55 Jim Lohmann T; 65 Gerald Roper G; 69 Bob Van Duyne T; 52 Al Wilson C; 64 Peter Wilson C/G; Defensive linemen: 63 Rick Goltz DT; 58 Nick Hebeler DE; 79 Tyrone Keys DE; 60 Rick Klassen DT; 78 Mack Moore DT; 74 Brent Racette DE | Linebackers: 50 Tyrone Crews; 37 Glen Jackson; 31 Kevin Konar; 44 Ron Morehouse; Defensive backs: 10 Melvin Byrd; 28 Larry Crawford; 16 Devon Ford; 18 Ken Hinton; 27 Pete Lavorato; 4 Nelson Martin; 17 Kerry Parker; 27 Tony Proudfoot; Special teams: 5 Lui Passaglia K/P; Italics indicate International player |

== Awards and records ==
=== 1982 CFL All-Stars ===
- DE – Nick Hebeler, CFL All-Star

=== 1982 CFL Western All-Stars ===
- WR – Mervyn Fernandez, CFL Western All-Star
- DE – Nick Hebeler, CFL Western All-Star
- LB – Glen Jackson, CFL Western All-Star
