= Keith Baker (gridiron football) =

American gridiron football player (born 1957)

Profile
- Position: Wide receiver

Personal information
- Born: June 4, 1957 (age 69); Dallas, Texas, U.S.
- Listed height: 5 ft 10 in (1.78 m)
- Listed weight: 185 lb (84 kg)

Career information
- College: Texas Southern

Career history
- 1979–1980: Montreal Alouettes
- 1981–1984: Hamilton Tiger-Cats
- 1984: Ottawa Rough Riders
- 1985: Philadelphia Eagles
- 1986: Toronto Argonauts

Awards and highlights
- CFL All-Star (1982)
- Stats at Pro Football Reference

Keith Leonard Baker is an American former professional football wide receiver who played seven seasons in the Canadian Football League (CFL). He was a CFL All Star in 1982. Baker also played one season in the National Football League (NFL).
