= John Pointer (gridiron football) =

American football player (born 1958)

No. 37, 47, 56
- Position: Linebacker

Personal information
- Born: January 16, 1958 (age 68); Columbia, Tennessee, U.S.
- Listed height: 6 ft 2 in (1.88 m)
- Listed weight: 225 lb (102 kg)

Career information
- High school: Columbia Central
- College: Vanderbilt
- NFL draft: 1980: undrafted

Career history
- Cincinnati Bengals (1980)*; Edmonton Eskimos (1981); Toronto Argonauts (1982); Winnipeg Blue Bombers (1983); Montreal Concordes (1984–1985); Green Bay Packers (1987)
- * Offseason or practice squad member only

Awards and highlights
- Grey Cup champion (1981); CFL Eastern All-Star (1982)

Career NFL statistics
- Fumble recoveries: 1
- Stats at Pro Football Reference

John Pointer (born January 16, 1958) is an American former professional football player who was a linebacker in the National Football League (NFL) and Canadian Football League (CFL). He played college football for the Vanderbilt Commodores. He played in the NFL for the Green Bay Packers.
