= Gary Dulin =

American gridiron football player (born 1957)

No. 94, 79, 69, 70, 61
- Positions: Defensive end, defensive tackle

Personal information
- Born: January 20, 1957 (age 69); Madisonville, Kentucky, U.S.
- Listed height: 6 ft 4 in (1.93 m)
- Listed weight: 275 lb (125 kg)

Career information
- High school: North Hopkins (Madisonville)
- College: Ohio State
- NFL draft: 1980: undrafted

Career history
- New York Jets (1980)*; Ottawa Rough Riders (1982–1984); Saskatchewan Roughriders (1985); Toronto Argonauts (1985); St. Louis Cardinals (1986–1987)
- * Offseason or practice squad member only

Awards and highlights
- CFL All-Star (1983); 2× CFL East All-Star (1982, 1983)

Career NFL statistics
- Sacks: 0.5
- Stats at Pro Football Reference

Gary Dulin (born January 20, 1957) is an American former professional football player who was a defensive end and defensive tackle in the National Football League (NFL) and Canadian Football League (CFL). He played college football for the Ohio State Buckeyes. He played for the Ottawa Rough Riders from 1982 to 1984, the Saskatchewan Roughriders and Toronto Argonauts in 1985 and for the St. Louis Cardinals from 1986 to 1987.
