= Pete Gales =

American gridiron football player (born 1959)

Peter Gales (born November 6, 1959) is a former Canadian football quarterback in the Canadian Football League who played for the Hamilton Tiger-Cats. He played college football for the Iowa Hawkeyes.
