= Fran McDermott =

Canadian football player (born 1960)

Profile
- Position: Defensive back

Personal information
- Born: April 3, 1960 (age 66); Amarillo, Texas, US
- Listed height: 5 ft 10 in (1.78 m)
- Listed weight: 182 lb (83 kg)

Career information
- College: St. Mary's (CA)

Career history
- 1981–1986: Saskatchewan Roughriders

Awards and highlights
- CFL West All-Star (1982)

Francis John McDermott (born April 3, 1960) is a Canadian football player who played professionally for the Saskatchewan Roughriders.
