= 1982 Calgary Stampeders season =

Canadian football team season

- General manager: Jack Gotta
- Head coach: Jack Gotta
- Home stadium: McMahon Stadium

Results
- Record: 9–6–1
- Division place: 3rd, West
- Playoffs: Lost West Semi-Final

The 1982 Calgary Stampeders finished in third place in the West Division with a 9–6–1 record. They appeared in the West Semi-Final where they lost to the Winnipeg Blue Bombers.

== Preseason ==
=== Season schedule ===
Week	Date	Opponent	Results		Venue	Attendance
Week	Date	Opponent	Score	Record	Venue	Attendance
A	Wed, June 9	at Winnipeg Blue Bombers	L 0–22	0–1	Winnipeg Stadium	19,214
A	Sun, June 13	vs. Saskatchewan Roughriders	L 32–33	0–2	McMahon Stadium	25,174
C	Fri, June 25	at Edmonton Eskimos	W 23–18	1–2	Commonwealth Stadium	49,723
D	Tue, June 29	vs. BC Lions	W 23–22	2–2	McMahon Stadium	24,053

== Regular season ==
=== Season standings ===
West Division
Pos	Team	Pld	W	L	T	PF	PA	PD	Pts	Div	Stk
1	Edmonton Eskimos (C, Q)	16	11	5	0	544	323	221	22	5–3	W1
2	Winnipeg Blue Bombers (Q)	16	11	5	0	444	352	92	22	5–3	L2
3	Calgary Stampeders (Q)	16	9	6	1	403	440	−37	19	4–4	W1
4	BC Lions	16	9	7	0	449	390	59	18	3–5	W1
5	Saskatchewan Roughriders	16	6	9	1	427	436	−9	13	3–5	L2

Source: "CFL.ca". Archived from the original on 2009-07-14.
(C) First round bye; (Q) Qualified for playoffs

=== Season schedule ===
Week	Game	Date	Opponent	Results		Venue	Attendance
Week	Game	Date	Opponent	Score	Record	Venue	Attendance
1	1	Thu, Jul 8	at Toronto Argonauts	T 24–24	0–0–1	Exhibition Stadium	32,760
2	Bye						
3	2	Sat, Jul 24	vs. Saskatchewan Roughriders	L 19–25	0–1–1	McMahon Stadium	31,061
4	3	Sat, Jul 31	at Hamilton Tiger-Cats	W 30–12	1–1–1	Ivor Wynne Stadium	18,350
5	4	Fri, Aug 6	vs. Ottawa Rough Riders	W 30–19	2–1–1	McMahon Stadium	29,038
6	5	Sat, Aug 14	at BC Lions	W 30–8	3–1–1	Empire Stadium	26,184
7	6	Fri, Aug 20	vs. Winnipeg Blue Bombers	L 4–35	3–2–1	McMahon Stadium	34,951
8	7	Fri, Aug 27	at Montreal Concordes	W 31–30	4–2–1	Olympic Stadium	12,268
9	8	Mon, Sept 6	vs. Edmonton Eskimos	W 32–20	5–2–1	McMahon Stadium	33,577
10	9	Sat, Sept 11	at Winnipeg Blue Bombers	W 15–11	6–2–1	Winnipeg Stadium	30,119
11	10	Fri, Sept 17	vs. Toronto Argonauts	L 30–34	6–3–1	McMahon Stadium	34,271
12	11	Sun, Sept 26	at Edmonton Eskimos	L 17–36	6–4–1	Commonwealth Stadium	59,836
13	12	Sun, Oct 3	at Saskatchewan Roughriders	L 8–53	6–5–1	Taylor Field	28,245
14	13	Sat, Oct 9	vs. Montreal Concordes	W 34–24	7–5–1	McMahon Stadium	24,599
15	14	Sun, Oct 17	vs. Hamilton Tiger-Cats	W 55–48	8–5–1	McMahon Stadium	25,720
16	15	Sat, Oct 23	at Ottawa Rough Riders	L 19–42	8–6–1	Lansdowne Park	18,748
17	16	Sun, Oct 31	vs. BC Lions	W 25–19	9–6–1	McMahon Stadium	31,980

== Playoffs ==
Round	Date	Opponent	Results		Venue	Attendance
Round	Date	Opponent	Score	Record	Venue	Attendance
Western Semi-final	Sun, Nov 14	at Winnipeg Blue Bombers	L 3–24	0–1	Winnipeg Stadium	20,894

=== West Semi-Final ===
Team	Q1	Q2	Q3	Q4	Total
Calgary Stampeders	0	3	0	0	3
Winnipeg Blue Bombers	0	21	0	3	24

== Roster ==
1982 Calgary Stampeders final roster
Quarterbacks: 6 Gerry Dattilio; 8 Phil Kessel; 17 Bruce Threadgill; Running backs: 96 Rob Forbes; 16 Mike Kirkley; 11 James Sykes; Wide receivers: 3 Alton Alexis; 18 Willie Armstead; 22 Tom Forzani; 88 Jerry Parrish; 23 Darrell Smith; 9 Mike McTague P; Tight ends: 97 Dave Amer	Offensive linemen: 66 Lloyd Fairbanks T; 51 Jeff Inglis T; 69 Dave Kirzinger G; 56 Tom Krebs G/C; 59 Bob Lubig G/T; 41 Mark Moors C; Defensive linemen: 67 Franklin King DT; 89 Scott MacArthur DE; 64 Ed McAleney DT; 78 George Small DT; 62 Randy Trautman DE; 52 Rob Waite DT	Linebackers: 47 Larry Barker; 30 Danny Bass; 25 Doug Battershill; 54 Wayne Harris; 72 Bernie Morrison; 46 Mark Nelson; 58 James West; Defensive backs: 7 Lepoleon Ingram; 28 Terry Irvin; 37 Harry Kruger; 4 Darrell Moir; 32 Ray Odums; 31 Darryl Smith; 29 Darrel Toussaint; Special teams: 2 J. T. Hay K; Italics indicate American player

== Awards and records ==
=== 1982 CFL All-Stars ===
- OT – Lloyd Fairbanks, CFL All-Star
- LB – Danny Bass, CFL All-Star
- DB – Ray Odums, CFL All-Star

=== Western All-Stars ===
- RB – James Sykes, CFL Western All-Star
- WR – Willie Armstead, CFL Western All-Star
- OT – Lloyd Fairbanks, CFL Western All-Star
- LB – Danny Bass, CFL Western All-Star
- DB – Ray Odums, CFL Western All-Star
