= Lloyd Fairbanks =

Canadian gridiron football player (born 1953)

Profile
- Positions: Guard, offensive tackle

Personal information
- Born: April 28, 1953 (age 73); Raymond, Alberta, Canada

Career information
- College: BYU

Career history
- 1975–1982: Calgary Stampeders
- 1983–1985: Montreal Concordes
- 1986: Montreal Alouettes
- 1987–1988: Hamilton Tiger-Cats
- 1989–1991: Calgary Stampeders

Awards and highlights
- 2× CFL All-Star (1979, 1982); 3× CFL East AllStar (1984, 1985, 1986); 4× CFL West All-Star (1978, 1979, 1982, 1990); DeMarco-Becket Memorial Trophy (1982); Honour roll of TSN Top 50 CFL Players
- Canadian Football Hall of Fame (Class of 2023)

Lloyd Fairbanks (born April 28, 1953) is a Canadian former professional football offensive lineman who played seventeen seasons in the Canadian Football League (CFL). Fairbanks was named to the CFL's All-Star team 7 times.

Fairbanks was announced as a member of the Canadian Football Hall of Fame 2023 class on March 16, 2023.
