= Bobby Thompson (tackle) =

Canadian football player

Profile
- Position: Tackle

Personal information
- Born: September 9, 1959; Columbus, Ohio, US
- Died: January 27, 2005 (aged 45); Winnipeg, Manitoba, Canada
- Listed height: 6 ft 8 in (2.03 m)
- Listed weight: 290 lb (132 kg)

Career information
- College: Kansas State

Career history
- 1979–1983: Winnipeg Blue Bombers
- 1984: Hamilton Tiger-Cats

Awards and highlights
- CFL West All-Star (1982)

Robert Marvin Thompson Jr. (September 9, 1959 – January 27, 2005) was a Canadian football player who played professionally for the Winnipeg Blue Bombers and Hamilton Tiger-Cats.
