= 1982 Edmonton Eskimos season =

Canadian football team season

- General manager: Norm Kimball
- Head coach: Hugh Campbell
- Home stadium: Commonwealth Stadium

Results
- Record: 11–5
- Division place: 1st, West
- Playoffs: Won Grey Cup

Uniform

The 1982 Edmonton Eskimos finished in first place in the West Division with an 11–5 record and won their fifth consecutive Grey Cup championship after winning the 70th Grey Cup.

== Pre-season ==
=== Schedule ===
Game	Date	Opponent	Results		Venue	Attendance
Game	Date	Opponent	Score	Record	Venue	Attendance
A	June 10	at BC Lions	W 22–19	1–0		19,392
B	June 18	at Saskatchewan Roughriders	L 27–34	1–1		24,722
C	June 25	vs. Calgary Stampeders	L 18–23	1–2		49,723
D	July 2	vs. Winnipeg Blue Bombers	W 16–8	2–2		25,000

== Regular season ==
=== Season standings ===
West Division
Pos	Team	Pld	W	L	T	PF	PA	PD	Pts	Div	Stk
1	Edmonton Eskimos (C, Q)	16	11	5	0	544	323	221	22	5–3	W1
2	Winnipeg Blue Bombers (Q)	16	11	5	0	444	352	92	22	5–3	L2
3	Calgary Stampeders (Q)	16	9	6	1	403	440	−37	19	4–4	W1
4	BC Lions	16	9	7	0	449	390	59	18	3–5	W1
5	Saskatchewan Roughriders	16	6	9	1	427	436	−9	13	3–5	L2

Source: "CFL.ca". Archived from the original on 2009-07-14.
(C) First round bye; (Q) Qualified for playoffs

=== Season schedule ===
Week	Game	Date	Opponent	Results		Venue	Attendance
Week	Game	Date	Opponent	Score	Record	Venue	Attendance
1	1	July 11	at Ottawa Rough Riders	W 55–7	1–0		21,435
2	2	July 17	vs. Toronto Argonauts	W 31–12	2–0		55,974
3	3	July 25	at BC Lions	L 28–38	2–1		28,329
4	4	Aug 1	vs. Winnipeg Blue Bombers	L 26–32	2–2		57,596
5	5	Aug 7	at Toronto Argonauts	L 22–30	2–3		37,985
6	6	Aug 15	vs. Montreal Concordes	W 46–8	3–3		56,374
7	Bye						
8	7	Aug 29	vs. Saskatchewan Roughriders	L 25–32	3–4		59,723
9	8	Sept 6	at Calgary Stampeders	L 20–32	3–5		33,577
10	9	Sept 12	vs. Ottawa Rough Riders	W 47–11	4–5		54,622
11	10	Sept 19	at Hamilton Tiger-Cats	W 32–14	5–5		21,625
12	11	Sept 26	vs. Calgary Stampeders	W 36–17	6–5		59,836
13	Bye						
14	12	Oct 10	vs. BC Lions	W 30–1	7–5		59,979
15	13	Oct 16	at Montreal Concordes	W 53–39	8–5		16,375
16	14	Oct 23	at Winnipeg Blue Bombers	W 33–17	9–5		18,748
17	15	Oct 30	vs. Hamilton Tiger-Cats	W 14–11	10–5		59,104
18	16	Nov 7	at Saskatchewan Roughriders	W 46–22	11–5		27,830

Total attendance: 450,560
Average attendance: 56,320 (93.7%)

== Playoffs ==
Round	Date	Opponent	Results		Venue	Attendance
Round	Date	Opponent	Score	Record	Venue	Attendance
Division Final	Nov 21	vs. Winnipeg Blue Bombers	W 24–21	1–0	Commonwealth Stadium	51,111
Grey Cup	Nov 28	at Toronto Argonauts	W 32–16	2–0	Exhibition Stadium	54,741

=== Grey Cup ===
Teams	1 Q	2 Q	3 Q	4 Q	Final
Edmonton Eskimos	3	17	6	6	32
Toronto Argonauts	7	7	0	2	16

=== Awards and honours ===
- CFL's Most Outstanding Defensive Player Award – James "Quick" Parker
- Dave Dryburgh Memorial Trophy – Dave Cutler
- Dick Suderman Trophy – Dave "Dr. Death" Fennell
- Grey Cup Most Valuable Player (Offence) – Warren Moon
- Grey Cup Most Valuable Player (Defence) – Dave "Dr. Death" Fennell
- Jeff Nicklin Memorial Trophy – Tom Scott
- Norm Fieldgate Trophy – James "Quick" Parker
- Tom Pate Memorial Award – David Boone

== Roster ==
1982 Edmonton Eskimos final roster
**Quarterbacks**: 1 Warren Moon; 11 Cliff Olander; **Running backs**: 25 Jim Germany; 31 Sean Kehoe; 32 Neil Lumsden; 23 Angelo Santucci; **Receivers**: 27 Marco Cyncar; 79 Mark Debrueys; 77 Brian Fryer; 70 Brian Kelly; 73 Mike Levenseller; 22 Tom Scott; 71 Waddell Smith	**Offensive linemen**: 59 Leo Blanchard G; 53 Dan Butcher G; 67 Rod Connop T/C; 56 Ted Milian C; 63 Hector Pothier G/T; 62 Bill Stevenson T/G; 57 Eric Upton G; 44 Mark Wald C; **Defensive linemen**: 64 David Boone DE; 65 Dave Fennell NT; 58 Dan Kearns DE/NT; 60 Tom Tuinei DE	**Linebackers**: 36 Nereo Bolzon; 42 Danny Kepley; 75 Bill Manchuk; 40 James Parker; 30 Dale Potter; 20 Tom Towns; **Defensive backs**: 19 Ralph Dixon; 37 Emilio Fraietta; 28 Gary Hayes; 13 Larry Highbaugh; 29 Joe Hollimon; 24 Ed Jones; 18 Mike McLeod	**Special teams**: 26 Dave Cutler K; 8 Hank Ilesic P; **Injured list**: 54 Ken Walter T; Italics indicate International player **Bold** indicates Global player
