= Pete Catan =

American gridiron football player (born 1957)

Profile
- Position: Defensive end

Personal information
- Born: November 12, 1957 (age 68); Rochester, New York, U.S.
- Listed height: 6 ft 2 in (1.88 m)
- Listed weight: 240 lb (109 kg)

Career information
- College: Eastern Illinois
- NFL draft: 1981: undrafted

Career history
- Winnipeg Blue Bombers (1981–1983); Houston Gamblers (1984–1985); Hamilton Tiger-Cats (1987)

Pete Catan (born November 12, 1957) is an American former football player. He was one of the Houston Gamblers' leaders in quarterback sacks in 1985, Catan was credited with 20 sacks for losses totaling 146 1/2 yards in 1984. He was captain and 3-year All-American at Eastern Illinois University.
