= Mark Young (Canadian football) =

Canadian football player (born 1960)

Profile
- Position: Defensive back

Personal information
- Born: June 5, 1960 (age 66); Washington, DC, US
- Listed height: 5 ft 11 in (1.80 m)
- Listed weight: 180 lb (82 kg)

Career information
- College: Morgan State

Career history
- 1982–1983: Montreal Concordes
- 1983–1984: Hamilton Tiger-Cats

Awards and highlights
- CFL East All-Star (1982)

Mark Young (born June 5, 1960) is a Canadian football player who played professionally for the Hamilton Tiger-Cats and Montreal Concordes.
