= 1981 Ottawa Rough Riders season =

Canadian football team season

- Owner: Allan Waters
- General manager: Jake Dunlap
- Head coach: George Brancato
- Home stadium: Lansdowne Park

Results
- Record: 5–11
- Division place: 2nd, East
- Playoffs: Lost Grey Cup

Uniform

The 1981 Ottawa Rough Riders finished the season in second place in the East Division with a 5–11 record. They appeared in the Grey Cup game, in what would be their last Grey Cup appearance in franchise history, and the last for any Ottawa-based CFL team for 34 years.

== Offseason ==
=== CFL draft ===
Rd	Pick	Player	Position	School
0	0	John Park	TE	Bowling Green
0	0	Ian Beckstead	TE	Richmond
1	3	Maurice Doyle	RB	Toronto
2	12	Don Burns	WR	Ottawa
4	30	Eric Boss	DT	Toronto
5	39	Larry Ring	DB	Bishop's
6	48	Anthony Refosso	OT	Toronto
7	57	Rob Ball	DL	Queen's

=== Preseason ===
Date	Opponent	Final Score	Result	Attendance	Record
June 4	at Toronto Argonauts	20–12	Win	28,325	1–0
June 11	vs. Montreal Alouettes	18–17	Win	16,139	2–0
June 21	at Montreal Alouettes	21–17	Loss	21,249	2–1
June 26	vs. Toronto Argonauts	35–25	Win	14,092	3–1

== Regular season ==
=== Standings ===
East Division
Pos	Team	Pld	W	L	T	PF	PA	PD	Pts	Div	Stk
1	Hamilton Tiger-Cats (C, Q)	16	11	4	1	414	335	79	23	6–0	W1
2	Ottawa Rough Riders (Q)	16	5	11	0	306	446	−140	10	3–3	L1
3	Montreal Alouettes (Q)	16	3	13	0	267	518	−251	6	2–4	W1
4	Toronto Argonauts	16	2	14	0	241	506	−265	4	1–5	L2

Source: "CFL.ca - Official Site of the Canadian Football League 2". Archived from the original on 2009-07-14.
(C) First round bye; (Q) Qualified for playoffs

=== Schedule ===
Week	Game	Date	Opponent	Results		Venue	Attendance
Week	Game	Date	Opponent	Score	Record	Venue	Attendance
1	1	July 3	vs. Edmonton Eskimos	L 21–47	0–1		22,023
2	2	July 11	at Hamilton Tiger-Cats	L 10–47	0–2		22,345
3	3	July 17	vs. Montreal Alouettes	W 33–31	1–2		24,827
4	4	July 25	at BC Lions	L 17–31	1–3		26,661
5	Bye						
6	5	Aug 7	vs. Toronto Argonauts	W 38–11	2–3		22,658
7	6	Aug 15	vs. Saskatchewan Roughriders	L 16–32	2–4		18,408
8	7	Aug 21	at Calgary Stampeders	L 18–30	2–5		30,276
9	8	Aug 28	at Winnipeg Blue Bombers	L 8–31	2–6		26,031
10	9	Sept 4	vs. BC Lions	W 17–7	3–6		18,393
11	10	Sept 13	at Toronto Argonauts	W 23–6	4–6		30,340
12	11	Sept 20	at Saskatchewan Roughriders	L 23–26	4–7		28,335
13	12	Sept 26	vs. Hamilton Tiger-Cats	L 16–30	4–8		20,451
14	13	Oct 3	vs. Winnipeg Blue Bombers	L 24–44	4–9		15,523
15	14	Oct 12	at Edmonton Eskimos	L 6–24	4–10		45,805
16	15	Oct 18	vs. Calgary Stampeders	W 21–10	5–10		15,002
17	Bye						
18	16	Nov 1	at Montreal Alouettes	L 15–39	5–11		20,867

== Postseason ==
Round	Date	Opponent	Score	Result	Attendance
East Semi-Final	Nov 8	vs. Montreal Alouettes	20–16	Win	17,554
East Final	Nov 15	at Hamilton Tiger-Cats	17–13	Win	28,104
Grey Cup	Nov 22	Edmonton Eskimos	26–23	Loss	52,478

=== Grey Cup ===
Team	Q1	Q2	Q3	Q4	Total
Edmonton Eskimos	0	1	14	11	26
Ottawa Rough Riders	13	7	0	3	23

First quarter

Ottawa – FG – Gerry Organ 34 yards
Ottawa – FG – Gerry Organ 37 yards
Ottawa – TD – Jim Reid 1-yard run (Gerry Organ convert)

Second quarter

Ottawa – TD – Sam Platt 14-yard run (Gerry Organ convert)
Edmonton – Single – Dave Cutler 24 yards missed Field Goal

Third quarter

Edmonton – TD – Jim Germany 2-yard run (Dave Cutler convert)
Edmonton – TD – Warren Moon 1-yard run (Dave Cutler convert)

Fourth quarter

Ottawa – FG – Gerry Organ 28 yards
Edmonton – TD – Warren Moon 1-yard run (Marco Cyncar 2 point convert pass from Moon)
Edmonton – FG – Dave Cutler 27 yards

== Roster ==
1981 Ottawa Rough Riders final roster
Quarterbacks: 8 Jordan Case; 2 Kevin Starkey; 6 J. C. Watts; Running backs: 35 Calvin Fance; 24 John Park; 34 Derrek Peels; 26 Sam Platt; 32 Jim Reid; Wide receivers: 18 Jeff Avery; 3 Kelvin Kirk; 23 Pete Stenerson; 14 Pat Stoqua; 1 Bruce Walker; Tight ends: 77 Tony Gabriel	Offensive linemen: 54 Ian Beckstead T; 68 Val Belcher G; 64 Tim Hook C; 59 Malcolm Inglis T; 67 Rudy Phillips G; 50 Kevin Powell T; 56 Bob Stephen G; 55 Larry Tittley C; Defensive linemen: 63 Randy Fournier DE; 66 Greg Marshall DE; 73 Jim Piaskoski DE; 79 Mike Raines DT; 61 Doug Seymour DE; 52 Ron Simmons DT; 51 Ian Ward DT	Linebackers: 76 John Glassford; 36 Eric Manns; 43 William Mitchell; 53 Mike Peerman; 75 Rick Sowieta; Defensive backs: 25 Ricky Barden; 7 Carl Brazley; 30 Larry Brune; 20 Gary Cook; 22 Glenn Cook; 15 Billy Hardee; 17 Mark Philp; 21 Randy Rhino; 5 Jerome Stanton; 27 John Sutton; Special teams: 71 Gerry Organ K/P	Injured list: 65 Pat Staub G; -- Joe Taylor WR; Italics indicate International player

== Awards and honours ==
- James S. Dixon Trophy --Eastern Division Championship
- Lew Hayman Trophy -- Tony Gabriel

Grey Cup Most Valuable Player

- J.C. Watts - Offense
- John Glassford - Defence

CFL All-Stars

East Division

- Val Belcher -- Offensive Guard
- Tony Gabriel -- Tight End
- Mike Raines -- Defensive Tackle
- Randy Rhino -- Defensive Back
- Larry Brune -- Defensive Back

Belcher, Raines, and Rhino were also CFL All Stars in their respective positions.
