= 1981 Hamilton Tiger-Cats season =

Season of Canadian Football League team the Hamilton Tiger-Cats

- General manager: Ralph Sazio (3–2); Joe Zuger (8–2–1)
- Head coach: Frank Kush
- Home stadium: Ivor Wynne Stadium

Results
- Record: 11–4–1
- Division place: 1st, East
- Playoffs: Lost East Final
- Team MOP: Tom Clements
- Team MOC: Rocky DiPietro
- Team MOR: Howard Fields

The 1981 Hamilton Tiger-Cats season was the 24th season for the team in the Canadian Football League (CFL) and their 32nd overall. The Tiger-Cats finished in first place in the East Division for the second consecutive year with an 11–4–1 record. They lost the East Final to the heavy underdog Ottawa Rough Riders team that finished 5–11–0. In the first season of full inter-division play, the Tiger-Cats finished with a 6–0 record against the East Division, outscoring their opponents 197 to 71.

== Preseason ==
Week	Date	Opponent	Result	Record
A	June 7	at Montreal Alouettes	W 27–21	1–0
B	June 13	vs. Toronto Argonauts	L 3–15	1–1
C	June 18	at Toronto Argonauts	W 23–16	2–1
D	June 27	vs. Montreal Alouettes	L 24–38	2–2

== Regular season ==
=== Season standings ===
East Division
Pos	Team	Pld	W	L	T	PF	PA	PD	Pts	Div	Stk
1	Hamilton Tiger-Cats (C, Q)	16	11	4	1	414	335	79	23	6–0	W1
2	Ottawa Rough Riders (Q)	16	5	11	0	306	446	−140	10	3–3	L1
3	Montreal Alouettes (Q)	16	3	13	0	267	518	−251	6	2–4	W1
4	Toronto Argonauts	16	2	14	0	241	506	−265	4	1–5	L2

Source: "CFL.ca - Official Site of the Canadian Football League 2". Archived from the original on 2009-07-14.
(C) First round bye; (Q) Qualified for playoffs

=== Season schedule ===
Week	Date	Opponent	Result	Record
1	July 5	at Winnipeg Blue Bombers	W 33–23	1–0
2	July 11	vs. Ottawa Rough Riders	W 47–10	2–0
3	July 17	at Calgary Stampeders	L 6–26	2–1
4	July 25	vs. Toronto Argonauts	W 57–13	3–1
5	Aug 1	at Edmonton Eskimos	L 5–41	3–2
6	Aug 8	vs. Calgary Stampeders	W 28–16	4–2
7	Aug 16	at BC Lions	W 37–23	5–2
8	Bye			
9	Aug 29	vs. Montreal Alouettes	W 16–11	6–2
10	Sept 7	vs. Edmonton Eskimos	T 34–34	6–2–1
11	Sept 12	at Montreal Alouettes	W 26–10	7–2–1
12	Sept 20	vs. Winnipeg Blue Bombers	W 25–13	8–2–1
13	Sept 26	at Ottawa Rough Riders	W 30–16	9–2–1
14	Oct 4	at Saskatchewan Roughriders	W 30–26	10–2–1
15	Oct 12	vs. Saskatchewan Roughriders	L 12–28	10–3–1
16	Bye			
17	Oct 25	vs. BC Lions	L 7–34	10–4–1
18	Oct 31	at Toronto Argonauts	W 21–11	11–4–1

== Postseason ==
=== Schedule ===
Game	Date	Opponent	Result
East Final	Nov 15	vs. Ottawa Rough Riders	L 13–17

== Roster ==
1981 Hamilton Tiger-Cats final roster
Quarterbacks: 2 Tom Clements; 8 Dave Marler; Running backs: 22 Mark Bragagnolo; 24 Rufus Crawford; 32 Dave Graffi; 26 David Green; Wide receivers: 1 Keith Baker; 34 Gord Paterson; 71 Leif Pettersen; 70 Kerry Smith; 3 Steve Stapler	Tight ends: 23 Rocky Dipietro; Offensive linemen: 52 John Blake G; 54 Ross Francis G; 59 Ed Fulton T; 56 Alan Moffat G; 55 Bob Van Duyne T; 50 Henry Waszczuk C; Defensive linemen: 74 Ecomet Burley DT; 66 Grover Covington DE; 63 Rick Kalvaitis DT; 69 Jim Muller DE/DT; 60 Steve Parker DE	Linebackers: 41 Jack Blair; 47 Carm Carteri; 39 Ed Gataveckas; 36 John Priestner; 31 Ben Zambiasi; Defensive backs: 17 Jerry Anderson; 14 Gerald Bess; 16 Howard Fields; 30 Emil Nielsen; 27 Leroy Paul; 37 David Shaw; 6 Harold Woods; 28 Preston Young	Special teams: 10 Bernie Ruoff K/P; Injured list: 67 Doug Redl C; Italics indicate American players

== Awards and honours ==
=== 1981 All-Stars ===
- David Shaw, Defensive back
- Harold Woods, Defensive back
- Ben Zambiasi, Linebacker
