= 1981 CFL season =

Canadian Football League season

- East champions: Ottawa Rough Riders
- West champions: Edmonton Eskimos

69th Grey Cup
- Date: November 22, 1981
- Champions: Edmonton Eskimos

CFL seasons
- ← 1980 1982 →

Canadian Football League team locations: West, East

The 1981 CFL season is considered to be the 28th season in modern-day Canadian football, although it is officially the 24th Canadian Football League season.

== CFL news in 1981 ==
The Eastern and Western Football Conferences, which had carried on as separate and autonomous entities since the founding of the CFL in 1958, agreed to a full merger prior to the start of the 1981 season.

With the merger, the Eastern and Western Football Conferences were dissolved and renamed as the East and West Divisions.

The merger authorized the CFL to have full authority over league matters, including the adoption of a full interlocking schedule for both divisions. All nine teams played each other twice, once home and once away, regardless of their affiliated division. With the exception of six seasons; the three seasons of the CFL's U.S. expansion era from 1993 to 1995 and three seasons during the COVID-19 pandemic from 2021 to 2023, the League's teams played at least one game home and one away versus every other team in the League since the 1981 season.

In addition, the merger set up the CFL Board of Governors and the CFL Management Council to replace the Executive Committee and the General Managers Committee. After the 1980 season, after owning the team for over ten years, Montreal Alouettes owner Sam Berger retired and sold the team to Nelson Skalbania, who brought in high priced NFL talent who did not adapt to the Canadian game, bringing a terrible losing season to Montreal (they did, however, make the playoffs due to the weak division that year), and with it, a loss of fan support, and he lost money and because of the high priced talent he bankrupted the team. So the team folded after the season, but a year later, a new team, the Montreal Concordes, owned by Expos owner Charles Bronfman, took over the team's players and history.

The East was so weak this season that the Calgary Stampeders, despite being the West's fifth place team, finished with a better record than the second place Ottawa Rough Riders. Ottawa nevertheless upset the Hamilton Tiger-Cats and qualified for the Grey Cup despite winning only five games in the regular season finishing seventh overall.

The ensuing controversy over having a 5–11 team playing in the Grey Cup played a large part in eventually persuading the league to implement a cross-over rule permitting a fourth place team in one division to qualify for the playoffs in place of a third place team in the other division with a weaker record. Nevertheless, the current rule makes no provision to allow a fifth place team to make the playoffs even if its record is better than that of the second place team in the other division, which occurred in 2018.

== Regular season standings ==
=== Final regular season standings ===
West Division
Pos	Team	Pld	W	L	T	PF	PA	PD	Pts	Div	Stk
1	Edmonton Eskimos (C, Q)	16	14	1	1	576	277	299	29	–	
2	Winnipeg Blue Bombers (Q)	16	11	5	0	517	299	218	22	–	
3	BC Lions (Q)	16	10	6	0	438	377	61	20	–	
4	Saskatchewan Roughriders	16	9	7	0	431	371	60	18	–	
5	Calgary Stampeders	16	6	10	0	306	367	−61	12	–	

Source: "CFL.ca - Official Site of the Canadian Football League 2". Archived from the original on 14 July 2009.
(C) First round bye; (Q) Qualified for playoffs

East Division
Pos	Team	Pld	W	L	T	PF	PA	PD	Pts	Div	Stk
1	Hamilton Tiger-Cats (C, Q)	16	11	4	1	414	335	79	23	6–0	W1
2	Ottawa Rough Riders (Q)	16	5	11	0	306	446	−140	10	3–3	L1
3	Montreal Alouettes (Q)	16	3	13	0	267	518	−251	6	2–4	W1
4	Toronto Argonauts	16	2	14	0	241	506	−265	4	1–5	L2

Source: "CFL.ca - Official Site of the Canadian Football League 2". Archived from the original on 14 July 2009.
(C) First round bye; (Q) Qualified for playoffs

Edmonton and Hamilton have first round byes.

== Grey Cup playoffs ==
The Edmonton Eskimos are the 1981 Grey Cup champions, defeating the Ottawa Rough Riders, 26–23, at Montreal's Olympic Stadium. Edmonton won their fourth-straight championship on a last second Dave Cutler field-goal. The Rough Riders' J.C. Watts (QB) was named the Grey Cup's Most Valuable Player on Offence and John Glassford (LB) was named the Grey Cup's Most Valuable Player on Defence. The Eskimos' Neil Lumsden (RB) was named Grey Cup's Most Valuable Canadian.

=== Playoff bracket ===
November 8: Division Semifinals
East
E3	Montreal Alouettes	16
E2	Ottawa Rough Riders	20
West
W3	BC Lions	15
W2	Winnipeg Blue Bombers	11

November 15: Division Finals
E2	Ottawa Rough Riders	17
E1	Hamilton Tiger-Cats	13
W3	BC Lions	16
W1	Edmonton Eskimos	22

November 22: 69th Grey Cup @ Olympic Stadium – Montreal, Quebec
E2	Ottawa Rough Riders	23
W1	Edmonton Eskimos	26

== CFL leaders ==
- CFL passing leaders
- CFL rushing leaders
- CFL receiving leaders

== 1981 CFL All-Stars ==
=== Offence ===
- QB – Dieter Brock, Winnipeg Blue Bombers
- RB – Larry Key, BC Lions
- RB – Jim Germany, Edmonton Eskimos
- SB – Joe Poplawski, Winnipeg Blue Bombers
- SB – Joey Walters, Saskatchewan Roughriders
- WR – Brian Kelly, Edmonton Eskimos
- WR – James Scott, Montreal Alouettes
- C – Al Wilson, BC Lions
- OG – Val Belcher, Ottawa Rough Riders
- OG – Larry Butler, Winnipeg Blue Bombers
- OT – Bill Stevenson, Edmonton Eskimos
- OT – Hector Pothier, Edmonton Eskimos

=== Defence ===
- DT – Dave Fennell, Edmonton Eskimos
- DT – Mike Raines, Ottawa Rough Riders
- DE – David Boone, Edmonton Eskimos
- DE – Greg Marshall, Ottawa Rough Riders
- LB – Danny Kepley, Edmonton Eskimos
- LB – Ben Zambiasi, Hamilton Tiger-Cats
- LB – James "Quick" Parker, Edmonton Eskimos
- DB – Ray Odums, Calgary Stampeders
- DB – David Shaw, Hamilton Tiger-Cats
- DB – Harold Woods, Hamilton Tiger-Cats
- DB – Ed Jones, Edmonton Eskimos
- DB – Randy Rhino, Ottawa Rough Riders

=== Special teams ===
- P – Hank Ilesic, Edmonton Eskimos
- K – Trevor Kennerd, Winnipeg Blue Bombers

== 1981 Western All-Stars ==
=== Offence ===
- QB – Dieter Brock, Winnipeg Blue Bombers
- RB – Larry Key, BC Lions
- RB – Jim Germany, Edmonton Eskimos
- SB – Joe Poplawski, Winnipeg Blue Bombers
- TE – Joey Walters, Saskatchewan Roughriders
- WR – Brian Kelly, Edmonton Eskimos
- WR – Tyrone Gray, BC Lions
- WR – Eugene Goodlow, Winnipeg Blue Bombers
- C – Al Wilson, BC Lions
- OG – Nick Bastaja, Winnipeg Blue Bombers
- OG – Larry Butler, Winnipeg Blue Bombers
- OT – Bill Stevenson, Edmonton Eskimos
- OT – Hector Pothier, Edmonton Eskimos

=== Defence ===
- DT – Dave Fennell, Edmonton Eskimos
- DT – John Helton, Winnipeg Blue Bombers
- DT – Mike Samples, Saskatchewan Roughriders
- DE – David Boone, Edmonton Eskimos
- DE – Lyall Woznesensky, Saskatchewan Roughriders
- LB – Danny Kepley, Edmonton Eskimos
- LB – Vince Goldsmith, Saskatchewan Roughriders
- LB – James "Quick" Parker, Edmonton Eskimos
- DB – Ray Odums, Calgary Stampeders
- DB – Charles Williams, Winnipeg Blue Bombers
- DB – Merv Walker, Calgary Stampeders
- DB – Ed Jones, Edmonton Eskimos
- DB – Ken McEachern, Saskatchewan Roughriders

=== Special teams ===
- P – Hank Ilesic, Edmonton Eskimos
- K – Trevor Kennerd, Winnipeg Blue Bombers

== 1981 Eastern All-Stars ==
=== Offence ===
- QB – Tom Clements, Hamilton Tiger-Cats
- RB – Rufus Crawford, Hamilton Tiger-Cats
- RB – Cedric Minter, Toronto Argonauts
- SB – Rocky DiPietro, Hamilton Tiger-Cats
- TE – Tony Gabriel, Ottawa Rough Riders
- WR – Keith Baker, Hamilton Tiger-Cats
- WR – James Scott, Montreal Alouettes
- C – Henry Waszczuk, Hamilton Tiger-Cats
- OG – Val Belcher, Ottawa Rough Riders
- OG – Bill Norton, Montreal Alouettes
- OT – Doug Payton, Montreal Alouettes
- OT – Ed Fulton, Hamilton Tiger-Cats

=== Defence ===
- DT – Ecomet Burley, Hamilton Tiger-Cats
- DT – Mike Raines, Ottawa Rough Riders
- DE – Grover Covington, Hamilton Tiger-Cats
- DE – Greg Marshall, Ottawa Rough Riders
- LB – John Priestner, Hamilton Tiger-Cats
- LB – Ben Zambiasi, Hamilton Tiger-Cats
- LB – Carmelo Carteri, Hamilton Tiger-Cats
- DB – Leroy Paul, Hamilton Tiger-Cats
- DB – David Shaw, Hamilton Tiger-Cats
- DB – Harold Woods, Hamilton Tiger-Cats
- DB – Larry Brune, Ottawa Rough Riders
- DB – Randy Rhino, Ottawa Rough Riders

=== Special teams ===
- P – Zenon Andrusyshyn, Toronto Argonauts
- K – Bernie Ruoff, Hamilton Tiger-Cats

== 1981 CFL awards ==
- CFL's Most Outstanding Player Award – Dieter Brock (QB), Winnipeg Blue Bombers
- CFL's Most Outstanding Canadian Award – Joe Poplawski (SB), Winnipeg Blue Bombers
- CFL's Most Outstanding Defensive Player Award – Danny Kepley (LB), Edmonton Eskimos
- CFL's Most Outstanding Offensive Lineman Award – Larry Butler (OG), Winnipeg Blue Bombers
- CFL's Most Outstanding Rookie Award – Vince Goldsmith (LB), Saskatchewan Roughriders
- CFLPA's Outstanding Community Service Award – Ken McEachern (DB), Saskatchewan Roughriders
- CFL's Coach of the Year – Joe Faragalli, Saskatchewan Roughriders
