= 1981 Edmonton Eskimos season =

Canadian football team season

- General manager: Norm Kimball
- Head coach: Hugh Campbell
- Home stadium: Commonwealth Stadium

Results
- Record: 14–1–1
- Division place: 1st, West
- Playoffs: Won Grey Cup

Uniform

The 1981 Edmonton Eskimos finished in first place in the West Division with a 14–1–1 record and won their record fourth consecutive Grey Cup championship after winning the 69th Grey Cup.

== Pre-season ==
=== Schedule ===
Game	Date	Opponent	Results		Venue	Attendance
Game	Date	Opponent	Score	Record	Venue	Attendance
A	June 5	at Calgary Stampeders	W 12–11	1–0		29,292
B	June 10	at Winnipeg Blue Bombers	W 25–16	2–0		18,405
C	June 16	vs. Saskatchewan Roughriders	W 17–1	3–0		43,426
D	June 26	vs. BC Lions	W 26–2	4–0		43,346

== Regular season ==
=== Season standings ===
West Division
Pos	Team	Pld	W	L	T	PF	PA	PD	Pts	Div	Stk
1	Edmonton Eskimos (C, Q)	16	14	1	1	576	277	299	29	–	
2	Winnipeg Blue Bombers (Q)	16	11	5	0	517	299	218	22	–	
3	BC Lions (Q)	16	10	6	0	438	377	61	20	–	
4	Saskatchewan Roughriders	16	9	7	0	431	371	60	18	–	
5	Calgary Stampeders	16	6	10	0	306	367	−61	12	–	

Source: "CFL.ca - Official Site of the Canadian Football League 2". Archived from the original on 2009-07-14.
(C) First round bye; (Q) Qualified for playoffs

=== Season schedule ===
Week	Game	Date	Opponent	Results		Venue	Attendance
Week	Game	Date	Opponent	Score	Record	Venue	Attendance
1	1	July 3	at Ottawa Rough Riders	W 47–21	1–0		22,023
2	2	July 11	vs. Calgary Stampeders	W 30–10	2–0		43,346
3	3	July 19	at Winnipeg Blue Bombers	L 28–38	2–1		25,745
4	4	July 26	at Montreal Alouettes	W 33–17	3–1		45,385
5	5	Aug 1	vs. Hamilton Tiger-Cats	W 41–5	4–1		43,346
6	Bye						
7	6	Aug 13	at Toronto Argonauts	W 22–12	5–1		38,268
8	7	Aug 22	vs. Winnipeg Blue Bombers	W 28–10	6–1		43,346
9	8	Aug 30	vs. Saskatchewan Roughriders	W 44–34	7–1		43,346
10	9	Sept 7	at Hamilton Tiger-Cats	T 34–34	7–1–1		30,121
11	10	Sept 13	vs. BC Lions	W 38–21	8–1–1		43,346
12	11	Sept 19	at Calgary Stampeders	W 21–10	9–1–1		34,657
13	12	Sept 26	vs. Montreal Alouettes	W 62–11	10–1–1		48,422
14	13	Oct 3	at BC Lions	W 22–12	11–1–1		30,296
15	14	Oct 12	vs. Ottawa Rough Riders	W 24–6	12–1–1		45,805
16	15	Oct 18	at Saskatchewan Roughriders	W 41–29	13–1–1		30,312
17	16	Oct 24	vs. Toronto Argonauts	W 61–7	14–1–1		46,146
18	Bye						

Total attendance: 357,103
Average attendance: 44,638 (103.0%)

=== CFL Single Season Records Set ===
- Winning percentage (minimum 16 game season) - .906
- Wins by 10+ points - 14
- Highest turnover ration (since 1966) - +41

=== CFL Single Game Records Set ===
- Points scored, 1 quarter - 38 (second quarter vs Montreal September 26)

== Playoffs ==
Round	Date	Opponent	Results		Venue	Attendance
Round	Date	Opponent	Score	Record	Venue	Attendance
Division Final	Sun, Nov 15	vs. BC Lions	W 22–16	1–0	Commonwealth Stadium	52,861
Grey Cup	Sun, Nov 22	vs. Ottawa Rough Riders	W 26–23	2–0	Olympic Stadium	53,307

=== Grey Cup ===
Teams	1 Q	2 Q	3 Q	4 Q	Final
Edmonton Eskimos	0	1	14	11	26
Ottawa Rough Riders	13	7	0	3	23

=== Awards and honours ===
- CFL's Most Outstanding Defensive Player Award – Danny Kepley (LB)
- Dick Suderman Trophy – Neil Lumsden
- Norm Fieldgate Trophy – Danny Kepley

== Roster ==
1981 Edmonton Eskimos final roster
**Quarterbacks**: 9 Brian Broomell; 1 Warren Moon; 12 Tom Wilkinson; **Running backs**: 25 Jim Germany; 31 Sean Kehoe; 32 Neil Lumsden; 33 Craig Mallender; 23 Angelo Santucci; **Receivers**: 27 Marco Cyncar; 70 Brian Kelly; 15 Stu Lang; 22 Tom Scott; 71 Waddell Smith	**Offensive linemen**: 59 Leo Blanchard G; 53 Bob Howes C; 56 Ted Milian C; 63 Hector Pothier G/T; 62 Bill Stevenson T/G; 57 Eric Upton G; 44 Mark Wald C; **Defensive linemen**: 64 David Boone DE; 55 Ron Estay DE; 65 Dave Fennell NT; 58 Dan Kearns DE/NT	**Linebackers**: 42 Danny Kepley; 75 Bill Manchuk; 40 James Parker; 30 Dale Potter; 20 Tom Towns; **Defensive backs**: 37 Emilio Fraietta; 28 Gary Hayes; 13 Larry Highbaugh; 29 Joe Hollimon; 24 Ed Jones; 7 Pete Lavorato; 18 Mike McLeod	**Special teams**: 26 Dave Cutler K; 8 Hank Ilesic P; **Injured list**: 77 Brian Fryer WR; 34 John Pointer LB; Italics indicate American player **Bold** indicates Global player
