= List of Winnipeg Blue Bombers starting quarterbacks =

The following is an incomplete list of starting quarterbacks for the Winnipeg Blue Bombers of the Canadian Football League that have started a regular season game for the team. This list includes postseason appearances since 1992, but does not include preseason games. They are listed in order of most starts with any tiebreaker being the date of each player's first start at quarterback for the Blue Bombers.

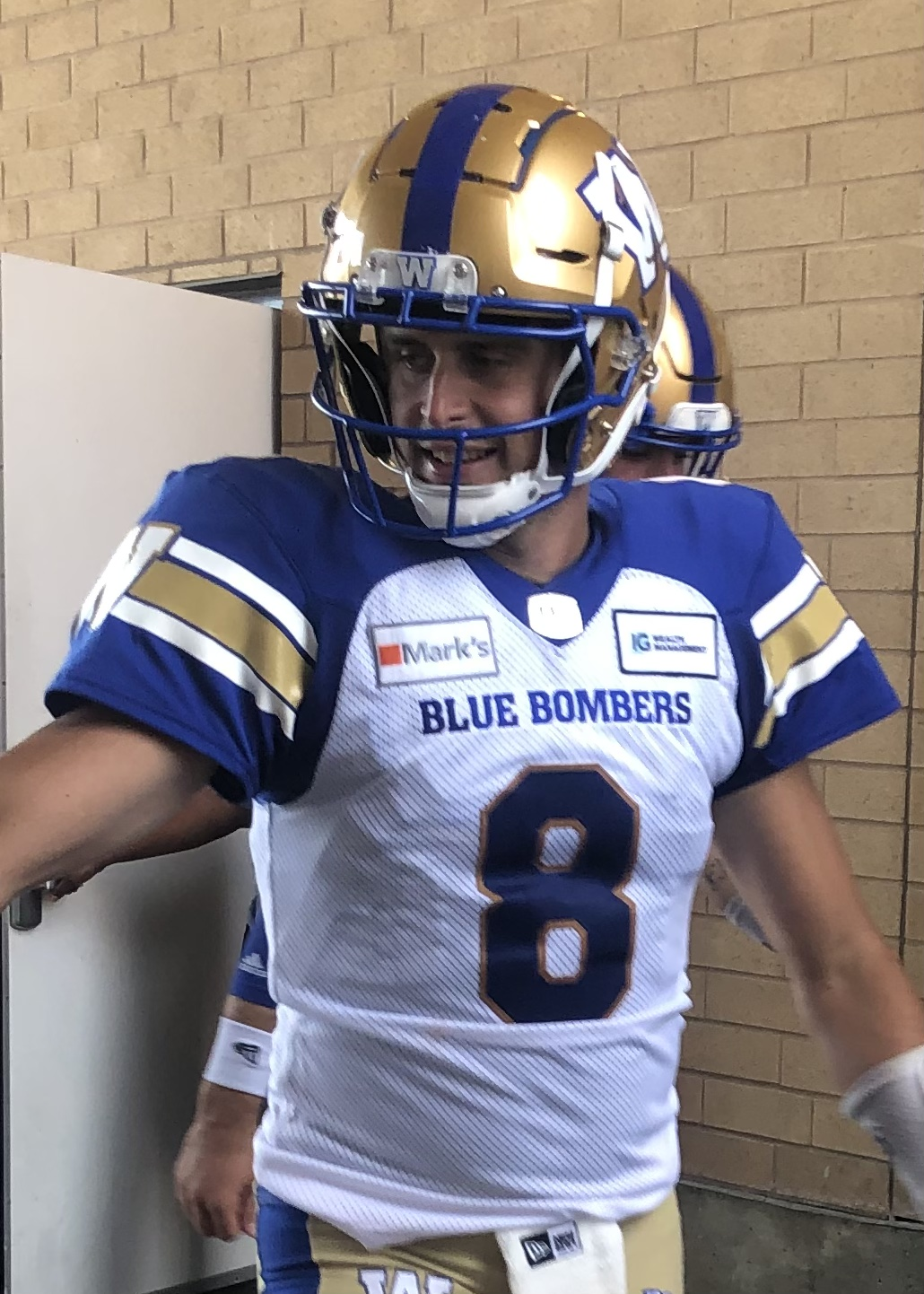
Zach Collaros won two Grey Cups as the team's starting quarterback.

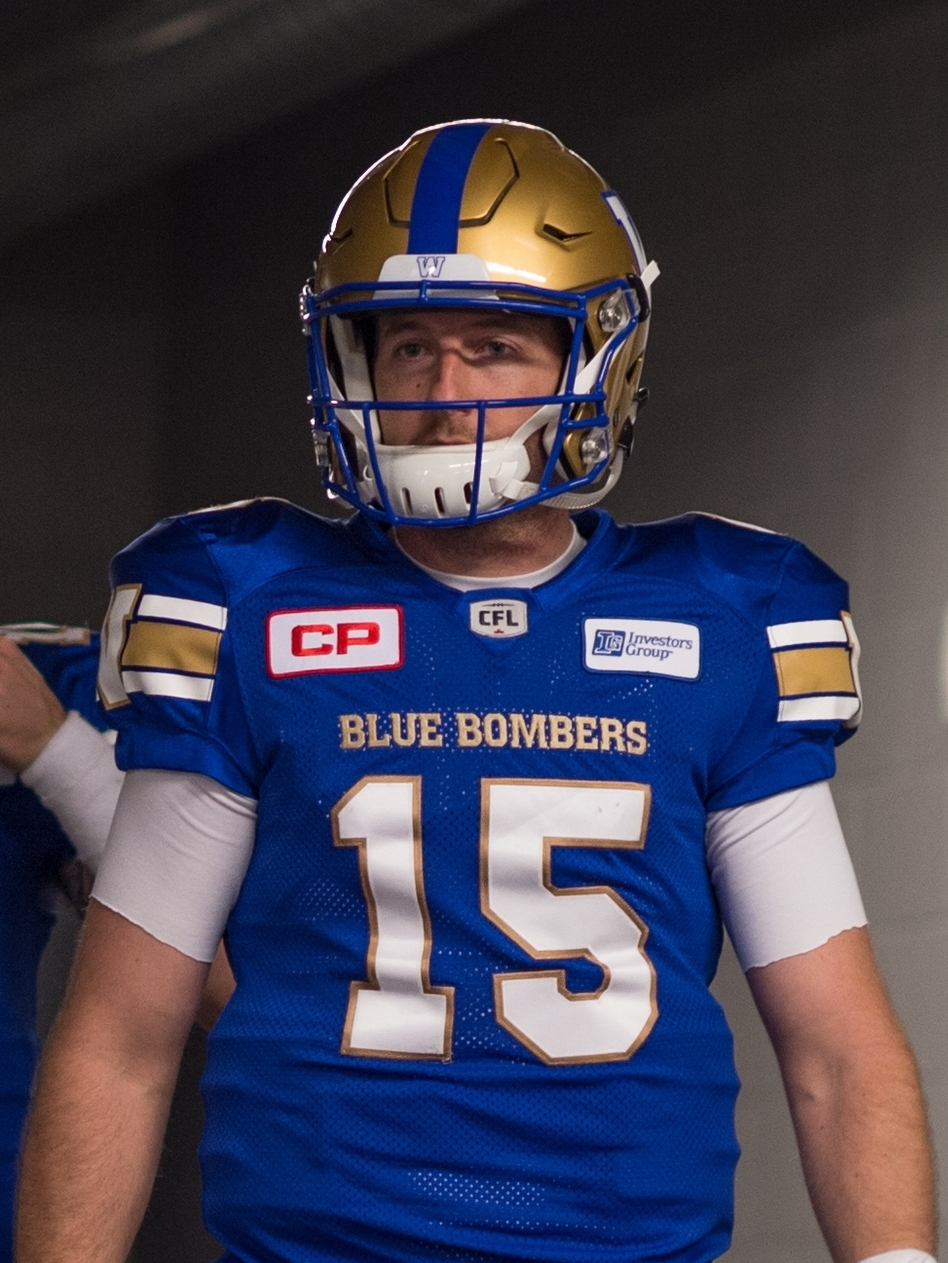
Matt Nichols holds the team record for most completions in a regular season.

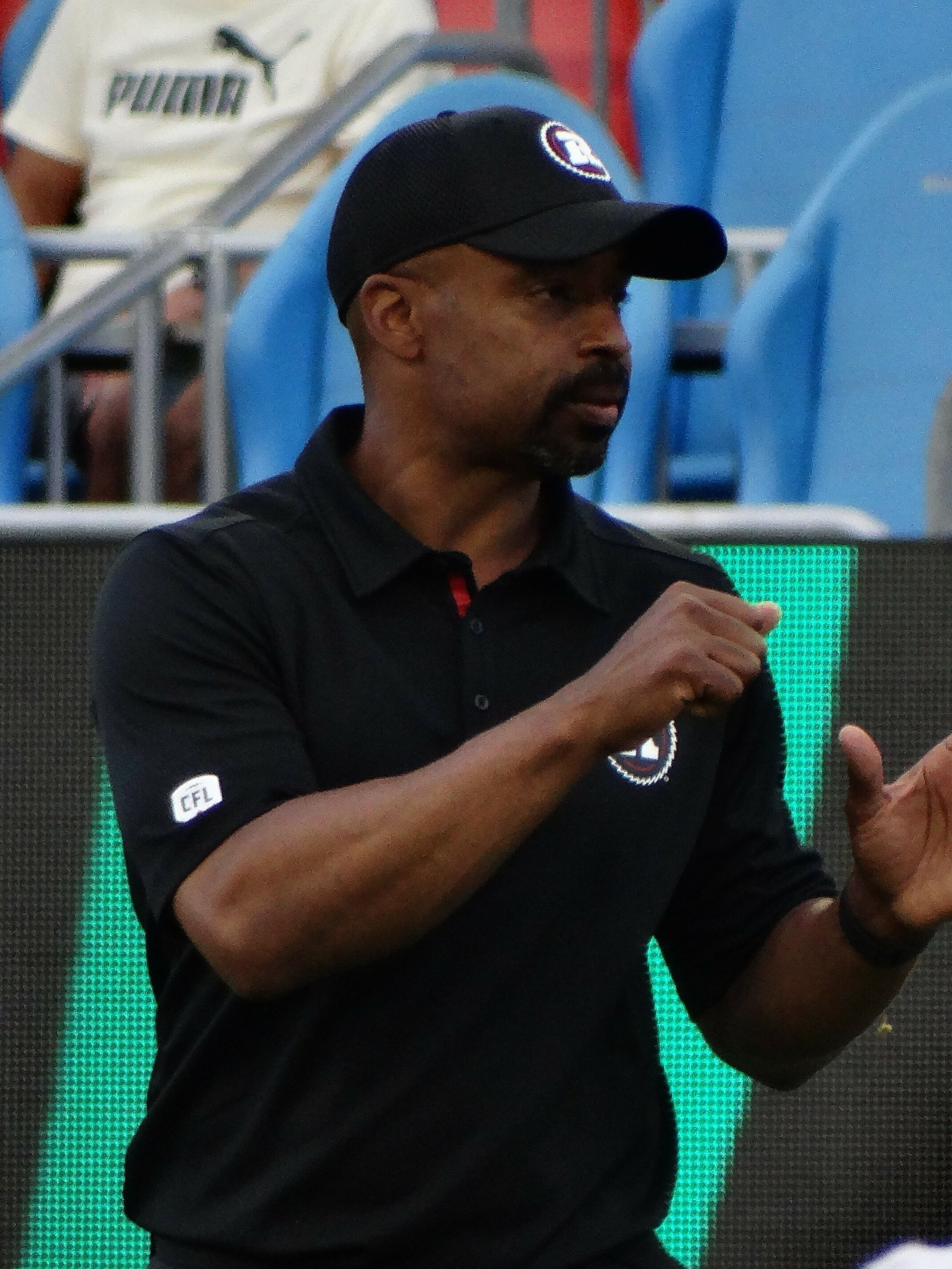
Khari Jones holds the team record for most passing yards and passing touchdowns in a regular season.

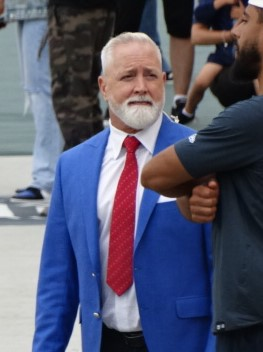
Matt Dunigan threw for a professional football record 713 yards in a single game as a Blue Bomber.

== Season-by-season ==
Where known, the number of games they started during the season is listed to the right:

Season(s)	Regular season	Postseason
2026	Zach Collaros (12) / Dru Brown (6)	Dru Brown (1) / Zach Collaros (1)
2025	Zach Collaros (13) / Chris Streveler (5)	Zach Collaros (1)
2024	Zach Collaros (17) / Chris Streveler (1)	Zach Collaros (2)
2023	Zach Collaros (16) / Dru Brown (2)	Zach Collaros (2)
2022	Zach Collaros (17) / Dru Brown (1)	Zach Collaros (2)
2021	Zach Collaros (13) / Sean McGuire (1)	Zach Collaros (2)
2020	Season cancelled due to COVID-19 pandemic	
2019	Matt Nichols (9) / Chris Streveler (8) / Zach Collaros (1)	Zach Collaros (3)
2018	Matt Nichols (14) / Chris Streveler (4)	Matt Nichols (2)
2017	Matt Nichols (17) / Dan LeFevour (1)	Matt Nichols (1)
2016	Matt Nichols (13) / Drew Willy (5)	Matt Nichols (1)
2015	Drew Willy (7) / Matt Nichols (7) / Robert Marve (2) / Brian Brohm (1) / Dominique Davis (1)	
2014	Drew Willy (17) / Brian Brohm (1)	
2013	Max Hall (9) / Justin Goltz (5) / Buck Pierce (4)	
2012	Buck Pierce (7) / Joey Elliott (7) / Alex Brink (4)	
2011	Buck Pierce (16) / Alex Brink (2)	Buck Pierce (2)
2010	Steven Jyles (10) / Buck Pierce (5) / Joey Elliott (2) / Alex Brink (1)	
2009	Michael Bishop (14) / Stefan LeFors (4)	
2008	Kevin Glenn (15) / Ryan Dinwiddie (3)	Kevin Glenn (1)
2007	Kevin Glenn (18)	Kevin Glenn (2) / Ryan Dinwiddie (1)
2006	Kevin Glenn (16) / Mike Quinn (2)	Kevin Glenn (1)
2005	Kevin Glenn (15) / Tee Martin (3)	
2004	Khari Jones (9) / Kevin Glenn (9)	
2003	Khari Jones (16) / Pat Barnes (2)	Khari Jones (1)
2002	Khari Jones (18)	Khari Jones (2)
2001	Khari Jones (17) / Brian Ah Yat (1)	Khari Jones (2)
2000	Khari Jones (15) / Kerwin Bell (3)	Khari Jones (2)
1999	Kerwin Bell (18)	
1998	T. J. Rubley (10) / Troy Kopp (7) / Kevin Mason (1)	
1997	Chris Vargas (12) / Kevin McDougal (6)	
1996	Kent Austin (11) / Reggie Slack (4) / Kevin McDougal (3)	Kent Austin (1)
1995	Reggie Slack (8) / Sammy Garza (5) / Kevin McDougal (3) / Shawn Moore (2)	Reggie Slack (1)
1994	Matt Dunigan (11) / Keithen McCant (6) / Sammy Garza (1)	Matt Dunigan (2)
1993	Matt Dunigan (16) / Sammy Garza (2)	Sammy Garza (2)
1992	Matt Dunigan (12) / Danny McManus (4) / Sammy Garza (2)	Matt Dunigan (2)
1991	Tom Burgess (16) / Danny McManus (2)	
1990	Tom Burgess (18)	
1989	Sean Salisbury (17) / Lee Saltz (1)	
1988	Tom Muecke (9) / Sean Salisbury (5) / Roy Dewalt (4)	
1987	Tom Clements (18)	
1986	Tom Clements (9) / John Hufnagel (9)	
1985	Tom Clements (15) / John Hufnagel (1)	
1984	Tom Clements (16)	
1983	Dieter Brock (5) / Carl Hall (4) / John Hufnagel (3) / Tom Clements (2) / Norman Gibbs (1) / Mark Jackson (1)	
1982	Dieter Brock (16)	
1981	Dieter Brock (16)	
1980	Dieter Brock (16)	
1979	Dieter Brock (11) / Bill Troup (5)	
1978	Dieter Brock (15) / Harry Knight (1)	
1977	Dieter Brock (15) / Harry Knight (1)	
1976	Dieter Brock (16)	
1975	Chuck Ealey (9) / Dieter Brock (7)	
1974	Chuck Ealey (9) / Don Jonas (6) / Dieter Brock (1)	
1973	Don Jonas (16)	
1972	Don Jonas (16)	
1971	Don Jonas (16)	

- * - Indicates that the number of starts is not known for that year for each quarterback

== Team passer rankings ==
Quarterbacks are listed by number of starts for the Winnipeg Blue Bombers.

Name	GS	W–L–T	Comp	Att	Pct	Yards	TD	Int
Ken Ploen	135	82–52–1	1,084	1,916	56.6	16,470	119	106
Dieter Brock	120	71–48–1	2,168	3,777	57.4	29,623	187	129
Zach Collaros	89	62–27–0	1,693	2,405	70.4	22,214	141	76
Khari Jones	73	44–28–1	1,416	2,346	60.4	20,175	139	98
Kevin Glenn	73	35–37–1	1,328	2,183	60.8	18,116	103	71
Jack Jacobs	62	38–21–3	709	1,330	53.3	11,094	104	53
Matt Nichols	60	39–21–0	1,312	1,930	68.0	14,977	89	42
Tom Clements	60	41–18–1	1,075	1,779	60.4	14,917	102	81
Don Jonas	53	24–27–2	821	1,553	52.9	12,291	75	95
Matt Dunigan	39	26–13–0	791	1,442	54.9	11,504	84	49
