= 1981 BC Lions season =

Canadian football team season

- General manager: Bob Ackles
- Head coach: Vic Rapp
- Home stadium: Empire Stadium

Results
- Record: 10–6
- Division place: 3rd, West
- Playoffs: Lost West Final

The 1981 BC Lions finished in third place in the West Division with a 10–6 record.

Joe Paopao had an excellent season with 3777 yards passing and 28 passing touchdowns and running back Larry Key had 19 touchdowns in a bounceback season after missing most of the 1980 season due to injury. Wideout Ty Gray had a breakout season with 1428 yards receiving.

The Lions beat Winnipeg in the West Semi-Final, but fell to the Eskimos 22–16 in the Western Final when Warren Moon hit Brian Kelly for a late 4th quarter touchdown. The Western Final included a game changing officiating error involving a Devon Ford kickoff return for a Lions touchdown when the officials incorrectly stated he stepped out-of-bounds. Television replays showed he clearly did not step out-of-bounds (video replay was instituted 25 years later in 2006).

Running back Larry Key and centre Al Wilson made the CFL all-star team.

This season marked the first time in Lions history that every regular season (16 in all) and playoff game (2) was televised.

== Offseason ==
=== CFL draft ===
Round	Pick	Player	Position	School

== Preseason ==
Game	Date	Opponent	Results		Venue	Attendance
Game	Date	Opponent	Score	Record	Venue	Attendance

== Regular season ==
=== Season standings ===
West Division
Pos	Team	Pld	W	L	T	PF	PA	PD	Pts	Div	Stk
1	Edmonton Eskimos (C, Q)	16	14	1	1	576	277	299	29	–	
2	Winnipeg Blue Bombers (Q)	16	11	5	0	517	299	218	22	–	
3	BC Lions (Q)	16	10	6	0	438	377	61	20	–	
4	Saskatchewan Roughriders	16	9	7	0	431	371	60	18	–	
5	Calgary Stampeders	16	6	10	0	306	367	−61	12	–	

Source: "CFL.ca - Official Site of the Canadian Football League 2". Archived from the original on 2009-07-14.
(C) First round bye; (Q) Qualified for playoffs

=== Season schedule ===
Week	Game	Date	Opponent	Results	
Week	Game	Date	Opponent	Score	Record
1	1	July 4	vs. Montreal Alouettes	W 48–8	1–0
2	Bye				
3	2	July 16	at Toronto Argonauts	W 32–28	2–0
4	3	July 25	vs. Ottawa Rough Riders	W 31–17	3–0
5	4	July 31	at Calgary Stampeders	W 52–29	4–0
6	5	Aug 9	at Saskatchewan Roughriders	W 28–24	5–0
7	6	Aug 16	vs. Hamilton Tiger-Cats	L 23–37	5–1
8	7	Aug 23	at Montreal Alouettes	W 29–14	6–1
9	8	Aug 29	vs. Calgary Stampeders	W 31–21	7–1
10	9	Sept 4	at Ottawa Rough Riders	L 7–17	7–2
11	10	Sept 13	at Edmonton Eskimos	L 21–38	7–3
12	11	Sept 19	vs. Toronto Argonauts	W 45–14	8–3
13	12	Sept 27	at Winnipeg Blue Bombers	L 10–46	8–4
14	13	Oct 3	vs. Edmonton Eskimos	L 12–22	8–5
15	Bye				
16	14	Oct 17	vs. Winnipeg Blue Bombers	L 22–49	8–6
17	15	Oct 25	at Hamilton Tiger-Cats	W 34–7	9–6
18	16	Oct 31	vs. Saskatchewan Roughriders	W 13–5	10–6

== Playoffs ==
=== West Semi-Final ===
Team	Q1	Q2	Q3	Q4	Total
BC Lions	0	11	3	1	15
Winnipeg Blue Bombers	7	1	0	3	11

=== West Final ===
Team	Q1	Q2	Q3	Q4	Total
BC Lions	3	13	0	0	16
Edmonton Eskimos	6	3	6	7	22

=== Offensive leaders ===
Player	Passing yds	Rushing yds	Receiving yds	TD
Joe Paopao	3777	25	0	0
Larry Key		1098	237	19
John Henry White		482	386	1
Tyrone Gray		10	1428	9
Ricky Ellis		13	594	4
Al Charuk		0	582	5
Harry Holt		4	367	2

== Roster ==
1981 BC Lions final roster
Quarterbacks: 9 Roy Dewalt; 6 Joe Paopao; Running backs: 11 Larry Key; 19 Don Taylor; 20 John Henry White; Wide receivers: 36 Terry Bailey; 25 Al Charuk; 32 Ty Gray; 21 John Pankratz; Tight ends: 7 Ricky Ellis; 72 Harry Holt; 34 Steve Kearns	Offensive linemen: 68 John Blain T; 62 Donnie Hickman T/G; 51 Tom Kudaba G; 54 Glenn Leonhard G; 55 Jim Lohmann T; 61 Rob Smith G/T; 52 Al Wilson C; 64 Peter Wilson C/G; Defensive linemen: 63 Rick Goltz DT; 58 Nick Hebeler DE; 79 Tyrone Keys DE; 60 Rick Klassen DT; 78 Mack Moore DT; 71 Richard Murray DE	Linebackers: 45 Sam Britts; 50 Tyrone Crews; 37 Glen Jackson; 31 Kevin Konar; 44 Ron Morehouse; Defensive backs: 28 Larry Crawford; 16 Devon Ford; 18 Ken Hinton; 3 Hal Lund; 4 Nelson Martin; 17 Kerry Parker; 27 Tony Proudfoot; Special teams: 5 Lui Passaglia K/P; Italics indicate International player

== Awards and records ==
=== 1981 CFL All-Stars ===
- RB – Larry Key, CFL All-Star
- C – Al Wilson, CFL All-Star

=== 1981 CFL Western All-Stars ===
- RB – Larry Key, CFL Western All-Star
- WR – Tyrone Grey, CFL All-Star
- C – Al Wilson, CFL Western All-Star
