= Vince Ferragamo =

American gridiron football player (born 1954)

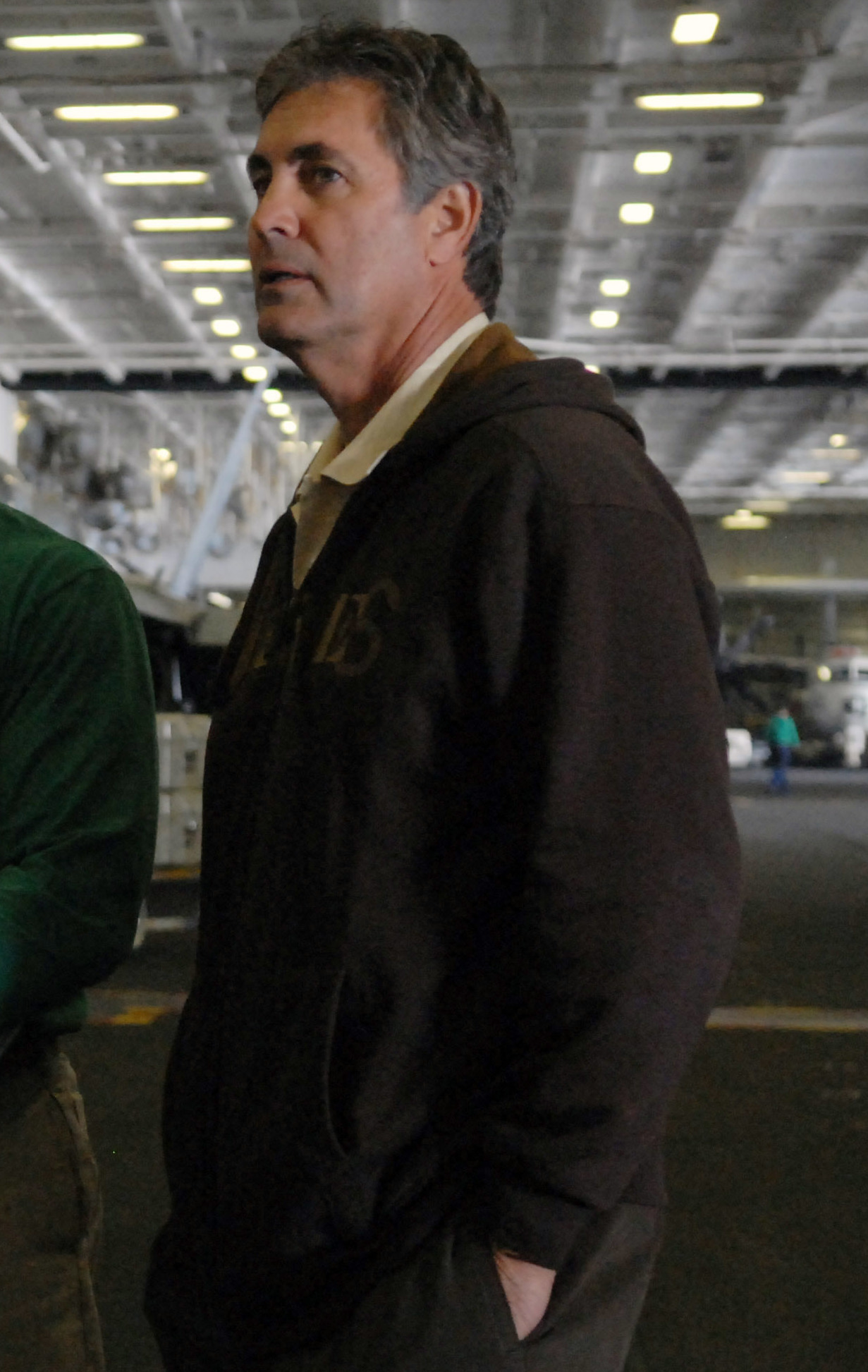
- Ferragamo in 2009

No. 15, 5
- Position: Quarterback

Personal information
- Born: April 24, 1954 (age 72); Torrance, California, U.S.
- Listed height: 6 ft 3 in (1.91 m)
- Listed weight: 212 lb (96 kg)

Career information
- High school: Phineas Banning (Los Angeles, California)
- College: California (1972–1973); Nebraska (1975–1976)
- NFL draft: 1977: 4th round, 91st overall pick

Career history
- Los Angeles Rams (1977–1980); Montreal Alouettes (1981); Los Angeles Rams (1982–1984); Buffalo Bills (1985); Green Bay Packers (1985–1986)

Awards and highlights
- Third-team All-American (1976); First-team All-Big Eight (1976); Italian American Sports Hall of Fame

Career NFL statistics
- Passing attempts: 1,615
- Passing completions: 902
- Completion percentage: 55.9%
- TD–INT: 76–91
- Passing yards: 11,336
- Passer rating: 70.1
- Stats at Pro Football Reference

Vincent Anthony Ferragamo (born April 24, 1954) is an American former professional football player who was a quarterback in the National Football League (NFL) and the Canadian Football League (CFL). He played college football for the California Golden Bears and Nebraska Cornhuskers.

== Early life ==
Born in Torrance, California, Ferragamo was an All-American high school quarterback while at Phineas Banning High School (1969–1972) in nearby Wilmington and was selected as that year's Los Angeles City Schools Most Valuable Player. Ferragamo was heavily recruited by colleges, and he accepted a football scholarship to the University of California, Berkeley.

== College football ==
Ferragamo became Cal's starting quarterback for the final three games of his true freshman season in 1972 and remained the starter through the following year. Ferragamo chose to transfer to top-ranked Nebraska in 1974. As a Cornhusker, he lettered in 1975 and 1976.

Nebraska was ranked No. 1 to open the 1976 season but managed only a 6–6 tie with LSU at Tiger Stadium on September 11. (The two teams were said to have waged "unrelenting trench warfare".) Ferragamo capped his college career by leading the Cornhuskers (9–3–1, ranked #13) to a victory over Texas Tech in the Astro-Bluebonnet Bowl in the Houston Astrodome. During his senior season, he was All-Big Eight Conference, All-American and also an Academic All-American.

== Professional football career ==
=== National Football League ===
Ferragamo played in the National Football League (NFL) for the Los Angeles Rams (1977–1980, 1982–1984), Buffalo Bills (1985), and Green Bay Packers (1985–1986).

Drafted 91st overall in the fourth round of the 1977 NFL draft, Ferragamo mostly sat on the bench in 1977 and 1978, behind Pat Haden (and in 1977, an aging Joe Namath). In 1979, Haden broke a finger in mid-season, giving Ferragamo his shot. After leading the 9–7 Rams to road victories over the Dallas Cowboys and Tampa Bay Buccaneers in the NFC playoffs, Ferragamo started in Super Bowl XIV in Pasadena, making him the first quarterback to start a Super Bowl in the same season as his first career start. The underdog Rams led after three quarters of play before falling to the Pittsburgh Steelers, 31–19.

Ferragamo enjoyed his best statistical season in 1980 in which he threw for 30 touchdowns, tied for second most in the NFL. The Rams again made the playoffs, but were defeated by Dallas, 34–13, in the wild card game.

=== Canadian Football League ===
In 1981, Ferragamo jumped to the Montreal Alouettes of the Canadian Football League, thanks to a $600,000-a-year contract (a large amount even by NFL standards, especially compared to $250,000 the Rams offered him, and the $47,500 they had paid him for 1980.) However, Ferragamo had a difficult time adjusting to the style of Canadian football, completing 175 of 342 passes (51.2%) for 2,175 yards, with only seven touchdown passes against 25 interceptions. He was demoted to backup to Gerry Dattilio in the latter half of the season and then to third-string quarterback for the final three games after Ken Johnson arrived in a trade. Montreal went on to a disastrous 3–13 season, but made the playoffs anyway due to weak East Division. (Montreal lost the Eastern semi-final to Ottawa; Ferragamo watched from the pressbox.)

In a span of less than eight months, he was featured on the cover of Sports Illustrated twice, in December 1980, and July 1981.

=== Return to NFL ===
Ferragamo returned to the Rams in 1982, as the backup to Bert Jones, who was sidelined with a neck injury. Late in the strike-shortened season on December 26, Ferragamo threw for 509 yards in a home loss to the Chicago Bears, at the time the second highest mark for passing yards in a game in league history behind former Ram Norm Van Brocklin in 1951. (As of 2022, Ferragamo's performance remains the 15th-best in NFL history.)

Ferragamo led the Rams back to the playoffs in 1983, behind the running of rookie Eric Dickerson. After beating the favored Cowboys in Irving in the wild card matchup, 24–17, the Rams were drubbed, 51–7, by the defending Super Bowl champion Washington Redskins.

In 1984, Ferragamo was again the Rams' starting quarterback. But in a 24–14 loss at Pittsburgh on September 16, he broke a finger on his throwing hand in what became his last game for the Rams. In 1985, Ferragamo moved on to the Buffalo Bills, but won only one of nine starts, eventually losing the starter's job to Bruce Mathison. In 1986, he served as Randy Wright's backup for the Green Bay Packers, then retired from football.

== NFL career statistics ==
Legend
**Bold**	Career high

=== Regular season ===
Year	Team	Games			Passing									Rushing					Sacks	
Year	Team	GP	GS	Record	Cmp	Att	Pct	Yds	Y/A	Lng	TD	Int	Rtg	Att	Yds	Avg	Lng	TD	Sck	Yds
1977	RAM	3	0	0–0	9	15	**60.0**	83	5.5	17	2	0	**114.7**	1	0	0.0	0	0	1	10
1978	RAM	9	0	0–0	7	20	35.0	114	5.7	28	0	2	15.4	2	10	**5.0**	12	0	2	19
1979	RAM	8	5	4–1	53	110	48.2	778	7.1	71	5	10	49.0	3	-2	-0.7	2	0	11	115
1980	RAM	**16**	15	**11–4**	240	404	59.4	3,199	**7.9**	74	**30**	19	89.7	15	**34**	2.3	**15**	**1**	**23**	**191**
1982	RAM	7	5	1–4	118	209	56.5	1,609	7.7	**85**	9	9	77.6	4	3	0.8	2	**1**	7	65
1983	RAM	**16**	**16**	9–7	**274**	**464**	59.1	**3,276**	7.1	61	22	**23**	75.9	**22**	17	0.8	8	0	21	178
1984	RAM	3	3	1–2	29	66	43.9	317	4.8	68	2	8	29.2	4	0	0.0	2	0	7	42
1985	BUF	10	9	1–8	149	287	51.9	1,677	5.8	48	5	17	50.8	8	15	1.9	5	**1**	19	135
1986	GB	3	0	0–0	23	40	57.5	283	7.1	50	1	3	56.6	1	0	0.0	0	0	3	15
Career		75	53	27–26	902	1,615	55.9	11,336	7.0	85	76	91	70.1	60	77	1.3	15	3	94	770

=== Playoffs ===
Year	Team	Games			Passing									Rushing					Sacks	
Year	Team	GP	GS	Record	Cmp	Att	Pct	Yds	Y/A	Lng	TD	Int	Rtg	Att	Yds	Avg	Lng	TD	Sck	Yds
1978	RAM	1	0	0–0	7	16	43.8	130	8.1	**65**	0	2	32.8	0	0	0.0	0	0	1	9
1979	RAM	**3**	**3**	**2–1**	**36**	69	**52.2**	**585**	**8.5**	50	3	**3**	**77.3**	3	**5**	**1.7**	**7**	0	**6**	**60**
1980	RAM	1	1	0–1	14	30	46.7	175	5.8	32	1	**3**	36.8	0	0	0.0	0	0	1	7
1983	RAM	2	2	1–1	35	**73**	47.9	337	4.6	32	**4**	**3**	62.4	**4**	-10	-2.5	-2	0	5	36
Career		7	6	3–3	92	188	48.9	1,227	6.5	65	8	11	59.9	7	-5	-0.7	7	0	13	112

== After football ==
Ferragamo owns Touchdown Real Estate in Orange County, and Ferragamo-Migneco Vineyards in Santa Maria, California. He is the chairman of the Vince Ferragamo Foundation, a non-profit charitable organization begun in 1996 that focuses on raising donations for children's organizations such as the Special Olympics, the Speech and Language Development Center and Ronald McDonald House Charities.

== See also ==
- List of 500-yard passing games in the National Football League
