= 1981 Winnipeg Blue Bombers season =

- General manager: Earl Lunsford
- Head coach: Ray Jauch
- Home stadium: Winnipeg Stadium

Results
- Record: 11–5
- Division place: 2nd, West
- Playoffs: Lost West Semi-Final

Uniform

The 1981 Winnipeg Blue Bombers finished in second place in the West Division with an 11–5 record. They appeared in the West Semi-Final but lost 15–11 to the BC Lions.

== Offseason ==
=== CFL draft ===
Rd	Pick	Player	Position	School

== Preseason ==
Game	Date	Opponent	Results		Venue	Attendance
Game	Date	Opponent	Score	Record	Venue	Attendance
A	Wed, June 3	vs. Saskatchewan Roughriders	L 10–19	0–1	Winnipeg Stadium	18,590
B	Wed, June 10	vs. Edmonton Eskimos	L 16–25	0–2	Winnipeg Stadium	18,405
C	Sat, June 20	at BC Lions	L 18–28	0–3	Empire Stadium	15,931
D	Fri, June 26	at Calgary Stampeders	W 16–14	1–3	McMahon Stadium	28,579

== Regular season ==
West Division
Pos	Team	Pld	W	L	T	PF	PA	PD	Pts	Div	Stk
1	Edmonton Eskimos (C, Q)	16	14	1	1	576	277	299	29	–	
2	Winnipeg Blue Bombers (Q)	16	11	5	0	517	299	218	22	–	
3	BC Lions (Q)	16	10	6	0	438	377	61	20	–	
4	Saskatchewan Roughriders	16	9	7	0	431	371	60	18	–	
5	Calgary Stampeders	16	6	10	0	306	367	−61	12	–	

Source: "CFL.ca - Official Site of the Canadian Football League 2". Archived from the original on 2009-07-14.
(C) First round bye; (Q) Qualified for playoffs

=== Schedule ===
Week	Game	Date	Opponent	Results		Venue	Attendance
Week	Game	Date	Opponent	Score	Record	Venue	Attendance
1	1	Sun, July 5	vs. Hamilton Tiger-Cats	L 23–33	0–1	Winnipeg Stadium	21,219
2	2	Sun, July 12	at Saskatchewan Roughriders	W 22–20	1–1	Taylor Field	24,740
3	3	Sun, July 19	vs. Edmonton Eskimos	W 38–28	2–1	Winnipeg Stadium	25,745
4	Bye						
5	4	Thu, July 30	at Toronto Argonauts	W 21–18	3–1	Exhibition Stadium	36,102
6	5	Sat, Aug 8	vs. Montreal Alouettes	W 58–2	4–1	Winnipeg Stadium	32,896
7	6	Fri, Aug 14	at Calgary Stampeders	L 17–18	4–2	McMahon Stadium	32,349
8	7	Sat, Aug 22	at Edmonton Eskimos	L 10–28	4–3	Commonwealth Stadium	43,346
9	8	Fri, Aug 28	vs. Ottawa Rough Riders	W 31–8	5–3	Winnipeg Stadium	26,031
10	Bye						
11	9	Sat, Sept 12	vs. Saskatchewan Roughriders	L 25–32	5–4	Winnipeg Stadium	31,773
12	10	Sun, Sept 20	at Hamilton Tiger-Cats	L 13–25	5–5	Ivor Wynne Stadium	24,130
13	11	Sun, Sept 27	vs. BC Lions	W 46–10	6–5	Winnipeg Stadium	27,930
14	12	Sat, Oct 3	at Ottawa Rough Riders	W 44–24	7–5	Lansdowne Park	15,523
15	13	Sun, Oct 11	vs. Toronto Argonauts	W 43–12	8–5	Winnipeg Stadium	22,717
16	14	Sat, Oct 17	at BC Lions	W 49–22	9–5	Empire Stadium	23,826
17	15	Sat, Oct 24	at Montreal Alouettes	W 33–13	10–5	Olympic Stadium	20,487
18	16	Sun, Nov 1	vs. Calgary Stampeders	W 44–6	11–5	Winnipeg Stadium	27,489

== Playoffs ==
=== West Semi-Final ===
Team	Q1	Q2	Q3	Q4	Total
BC Lions	0	11	3	1	15
Winnipeg Blue Bombers	7	1	0	3	11

== Roster ==
1981 Winnipeg Blue Bombers final roster
Quarterbacks: 5 Dieter Brock; 7 Mark Jackson; Running backs: 24 Obie Graves; 30 Dan Huclack; 37 Peter Martell; 33 William Miller; 32 Bruce Wilkins; Receivers: 25 Mike Collymore; 26 Bob Gaddis; 34 Eugene Goodlow; 31 Rick House; 73 John Konihowski; 79 Bob O'Doherty; 71 Joe Poplawski	Offensive linemen: 58 Marv Allemang G/C; 65 Nick Bastaja G/T; 43 John Bonk C; 68 Larry Butler G; 56 Franky Smith T; 50 Willie Thomas G; 61 Bobby Thompson T; 63 Chris Walby T; Defensive linemen: 53 Pete Catan DE; 60 Ron Cherkas DT; 99 John Helton DT/DE; 52 York Hentschel DT; 62 Dock Luckie DT; 55 Tony Norman DE	Linebackers: 76 Ken Ciancone; 72 Leo Ezerins; 54 Vernon Pahl; 57 James Reed; Defensive backs: 27 Paul Bennett; 22 Don Burrell; 10 Peter Crepin; 9 Vince Phason; 8 Reggie Pierson; 21 Gary Rosolowich; 20 Charles Williams; Special teams: 6 Bob Cameron P; 3 Trevor Kennerd K; Injured list: 70 Mike Holmes WR; Italics indicate American player
