= 1981 Montreal Alouettes season =

Canadian football team season

- Head coach: Joe Scannella; Jim Eddy (Interim)
- Home stadium: Olympic Stadium

Results
- Record: 3–13
- Division place: 3rd, East
- Playoffs: Lost East Semi-Final

Uniform

The 1981 Montreal Alouettes finished the season in third place in the East Division with a 3–13 record. They appeared in the East Semi-Final, where they lost to the Ottawa Rough Riders 20–16. After the season the Alouettes folded after owner Nelson Skalbania lost $2 million, and the CFL revoked the franchise from him with the team now heavily in debt.

== Offseason ==
The Alouettes were purchased by Nelson Skalbania. Skalbania proceeded by signing several American stars. His biggest acquisition was Los Angeles Rams quarterback Vince Ferragamo (who appeared in Super Bowl XIV) to a $300,000 contract. The other signings included wide receiver James Scott, kick return specialist Billy "White Shoes" Johnson, running back David Overstreet and defensive end Keith Gary.

== Preseason ==
Game	Date	Opponent	Results		Venue	Attendance
Game	Date	Opponent	Score	Record	Venue	Attendance
A	Sun, June 7	vs. Hamilton Tiger-Cats	L 21–27	0–1	Olympic Stadium	21,742
B	Tue, June 11	at Ottawa Rough Riders	L 17–18	0–2	Lansdowne Park	16,139
C	Sun, June 21	vs. Ottawa Rough Riders	W 21–17	1–2	Olympic Stadium	21,249
D	Sat, July 27	at Hamilton Tiger-Cats	W 38–24	2–2	Ivor Wynne Stadium	16,604

== Regular season ==
Despite the high-profile talent, the Alouettes finished the season with only 3 wins, but because of how weak the East Division was that year, the team did earn a playoff berth (the crossover rule, which allows a fourth place team with a better record than a third place team in the other division to qualify, had not yet been implemented). Skalbania lost two million dollars and the CFL revoked his ownership.

=== Standings ===
East Division
Pos	Team	Pld	W	L	T	PF	PA	PD	Pts	Div	Stk
1	Hamilton Tiger-Cats (C, Q)	16	11	4	1	414	335	79	23	6–0	W1
2	Ottawa Rough Riders (Q)	16	5	11	0	306	446	−140	10	3–3	L1
3	Montreal Alouettes (Q)	16	3	13	0	267	518	−251	6	2–4	W1
4	Toronto Argonauts	16	2	14	0	241	506	−265	4	1–5	L2

Source: "CFL.ca - Official Site of the Canadian Football League 2". Archived from the original on 2009-07-14.
(C) First round bye; (Q) Qualified for playoffs

=== Schedule ===
Week	Game	Date	Opponent	Results		Venue	Attendance
Week	Game	Date	Opponent	Score	Record	Venue	Attendance
1	1	Sat, July 4	at BC Lions	L 8–48	0–1	Empire Stadium	26,627
2	2	Fri, July 10	vs. Toronto Argonauts	W 23–22	1–1	Olympic Stadium	35,281
3	3	Fri, July 17	at Ottawa Rough Riders	L 31–33	1–2	Lansdowne Park	24,872
4	4	Sun, July 26	vs. Edmonton Eskimos	L 17–33	1–3	Olympic Stadium	45,835
5	5	Sun, Aug 2	vs. Saskatchewan Roughriders	L 23–43	1–4	Olympic Stadium	33,205
6	6	Sat, Aug 8	at Winnipeg Blue Bombers	L 2–58	1–5	Winnipeg Stadium	32,936
7	Bye						
8	7	Sun, Aug 23	vs. BC Lions	L 14–29	1–6	Olympic Stadium	28,932
9	8	Sat, Aug 29	at Hamilton Tiger-Cats	L 11–16	1–7	Ivor Wynne Stadium	27,180
10	9	Sun, Sept 6	at Saskatchewan Roughriders	L 26–35	1–8	Taylor Field	28,526
11	10	Sat, Sept 12	vs. Hamilton Tiger-Cats	L 10–26	1–9	Olympic Stadium	27,270
12	Bye						
13	11	Sat, Sept 26	at Edmonton Eskimos	L 11–62	1–10	Commonwealth Stadium	48,470
14	12	Sun, Oct 4	vs. Calgary Stampeders	W 22–16	2–10	Olympic Stadium	22,222
15	13	Sat, Oct 10	at Calgary Stampeders	L 3–29	2–11	McMahon Stadium	28,896
16	14	Sat, Oct 17	at Toronto Argonauts	L 14–20	2–12	Exhibition Stadium	31,038
17	15	Sat, Oct 24	vs. Winnipeg Blue Bombers	L 13–33	2–13	Olympic Stadium	20,487
18	16	Sun, Nov 1	vs. Ottawa Rough Riders	W 39–15	3–13	Olympic Stadium	20,867

== Postseason ==
Round	Date	Opponent	Results		Venue	Attendance
Round	Date	Opponent	Score	Record	Venue	Attendance
East Semi-Final	Sun, Nov 8	at Ottawa Rough Riders	L 16–20	0–1	Lansdowne Park	17,754

== Roster ==
1981 Montreal Alouettes final roster
**Quarterbacks**: 9 Gerry Dattilio; 15 Vince Ferragamo; 19 Ken Johnson; **Running backs**: 10 Joe Hawco; 26 Marc Lacelle; 33 Chuck McMann; 20 David Overstreet; 32 Skip Walker; **Wide receivers**: 24 Billy Johnson; 10 Ian Mofford; 89 James Scott; 37 Dom Vetro	**Tight ends**: 79 Nick Arakgi; 74 Peter Dalla Riva; **Offensive linemen**: 44 Mike Hameluck C/G; 41 Glenn Keeble C/G; 58 Roland Mangold G; 69 Bill Norton T/G; 61 Doug Payton T/G; 65 Ron Singleton T; **Defensive linemen**: 77 Junior Ah You DE; 76 Gene Belliveau DT; 75 Keith Gary DE; 70 Doug Scott DE/DT; 64 Glen Weir DT; 55 James Zachery DE	**Linebackers**: 39 Wally Buono P; 35 Lou Clare; 72 Jeff Gabrielson; 62 Bill Hampton; 42 Tim Kist; **Defensive backs**: 5 Charles Cornelius; 12 Al Dosant; 14 David Dumars; 27 Steve Gelley; 22 Joe Kuklo; 23 Jim Marshall; 7 Ken Miller; 2 Woodrow Wilson; **Special teams**: 11 Don Sweet K/P	**Injured list**: 1 Gregg Butler DB; 45 Tom Cousineau LB; Italics indicate American players **Bold** indicates Global player
