= 1980 All-South Independent football team =

American college football season

The 1980 All-South Independent football team consists of American football players chosen by the Associated Press for their All-South independent teams for the 1980 NCAA Division I-A football season.

== Offense ==
Quarterback

- Larry Gentry, UNLV (AP-1)
- Nickie Hall, Tulane (AP-2)

Running backs

- George Rogers, South Carolina (AP-1)
- Cyrus Lawrence, Virginia Tech (AP-1)
- Sammy Winder, Southern Mississippi (AP-1)
- Anthony Collins, East Carolina (AP-2)
- Sam Platt, Florida State (AP-2)

Wide receivers

- Mike Jones, Tennessee State (AP-1)
- Sidney Snell, Virginia Tech (AP-1)
- Robert Griffin, Tulane (AP-2)
- Ken Tweedy, Richmond (AP-2)

Tight end

- Marvin Harvey, Southern Mississippi (AP-1)
- Willie Scott, South Carolina (AP-2)

Offensive tackles

- Ken Lanier, Florida State (AP-1)
- George Schechterly, South Carolina (AP-1)
- John Canei, Miami (AP-2)
- Dexter Berry, Tennessee State (AP-2)

Offensive guards

- Grew Futch, Florida State (AP-1)
- Jesse Moore, Richmond (AP-1)
- Arnie Diaz, Tulane (AP-2)
- Joe Jacoby, Louisville (AP-2)

Center

- Jamey Watson, Southern Mississippi (AP-1)
- Arthur Christophe, Northeast Louisiana (AP-2)

== Defense ==
Defensive ends

- Robert Brown, Virginia Tech (AP-1)
- George Tillman, Southern Mississippi (AP-1)
- Paul Tyner, William & Mary (AP-2)
- Jay Trautwein, Louisville (AP-2)

Defensive tackles

- Mark Macek, Florida State (AP-1)
- Chuck Allen, South Carolina (AP-1)
- Jim Burt, Miami (AP-1)
- Kevin Cole, Tulane (AP-2)
- Garry Futch, Florida State (AP-2)
- Wilfred Simon, Tulane (AP-2)

Linebackers

- Reggie Herring, Florida State (AP-1)
- Eddie Johnson, Louisville (AP-1)
- Marty Wetzel, Tulane (AP-2)
- Paul Piurowski, Florida State (AP-2)

Defensive backs

- Bobby Butler, Florida State (AP-1)
- Hanford Dixon, Southern Mississippi (AP-1)
- Fred Marion, Miami (AP-1)
- Monk Bonasorte, Florida State (AP-1)
- Jody Norman, Northeast Louisiana (AP-2)
- Robert Pelotte, South Carolina (AP-2)
- Leon Williams, Louisville (AP-2)
- Reuben Turner, Richmond (AP-2)

== Special teams ==
Kicker

- Bill Capece, Florida State (AP-1)
- Eddie Leopold, South Carolina (AP-2)

Punter

- Dave Smigelsky, Virginia Tech (AP-1)
