= Kevin Starkey =

American gridiron football player (born 1958)

Profile
- Position: Quarterback

Personal information
- Born: July 9, 1958 (age 68); Santa Monica, California
- Listed height: 6 ft 1 in (1.85 m)
- Listed weight: 190 lb (86 kg)

Career information
- College: Long Beach

Career history
- 1981–1983: Ottawa Rough Riders
- 1983: Montreal Concordes
- 1985: Portland Breakers

Career statistics
- TD–INT: 11–22
- Yards: 1923
- QB rating: 52.75
- Comp-Att: 137–275
- %: 49.8

Kevin Starkey (born July 9, 1958) is the chief operating officer for the Anaheim Arena Management in charge of the Honda Center. Before starting his career with the Anaheim Ducks in 1993, Starkey played gridiron football for El Camino College and Long Beach State. With El Camino, Starkey was their Most Valuable Player in 1977 while he accumulated 1814 passing yards and 11 touchdowns. As part of his 2238 career passing yards with Long Beach, Starkey was 7th in passing yards during the 1980 NCAA Division I-A football season.

Starkey was a former Canadian Football League quarterback for the Ottawa Rough Riders and the Montreal Concordes during the 1980s. In the United States Football League, Starkey played for the Portland Breakers in 1985 before ending his gridiron football career. With both leagues, Starkey had a combined total of 1923 passing yards, 11 touchdowns and 22 interceptions. In 1998, he became part of a hall of fame for El Camino.

== Early life and education ==
On July 9, 1958, Starkey was born in Santa Monica, California. Growing up during the 1970s, Starkey was a quarterback at Bishop Montgomery High School. With Bishop Montgomery, Starkey was a co-captain for their football team in 1975. The following year, Starkey played in an all star game held by the West Torrance Lions.

In 1976, Starkey was in the top three for multiple Metropolitan Conference categories in college football while playing for El Camino College. With El Camino, Starkey was named Most Valuable Player for their football team in 1977. Upon leaving for Colorado State in February 1978, Starkey had 11 touchdowns and 1814 passing yards for El Camino. At Colorado State, Starkey was a redshirt.

In June 1978, Starkey requested to leave the football team after he was not chosen to become their quarterback. Before he left for the Long Beach State 49ers football team in 1978, Starkey did not accept his scholarship offer from Colorado State. Starkey was a quarterback for Long Beach State from 1979 to 1980. During the 1980 NCAA Division I-A football season, Starkey was 7th in season passing yards with 1955 yards. Starkey and his football team also won the 1980 Pacific Coast Athletic Association title. At playing 17 career games with Long Beach, Starkey had 4 touchdowns and 2238 passing yards.

== Career ==
After college, Starkey attempted to gain a spot in the National Football League. After multiple tryouts with the NFL, Starkey went to the Canadian Football League. Starkey began his CFL career with the Ottawa Rough Riders in 1981. He remained with the Rough Riders until he started to play for the Montreal Concordes in 1983. During his time in the CFL, Starkey and Ottawa won the Eastern Division game leading up to the 1981 Grey Cup. The following year, Starkey and the Rough Riders lost the Eastern Division game that precluded the 1982 Grey Cup.

With the United States Football League, Starkey was a member of the Oakland Invaders and Memphis Showboats in 1984 but did not appear in any games. The following year, Starkey became a player for the Portland Breakers. After his final gridiron football season in 1985, Starkey had a combined total of 1923 passing yards with the CFL and USFL. After competing in both leagues, Starkey had 11 touchdowns and 22 interceptions.

Following his professional football career, Starkey began working with the Anaheim Ducks in 1993. Starkey was in charge of various projects to the Honda Center which included the renovations of multiple food establishments for the stadium. He is currently the chief operating officer of the Anaheim Arena Management.

== Honors and personal life ==
Starkey was inducted into a hall of fame for El Camino in 1998. He is married and has three children.
