= 1981 Calgary Stampeders season =

Canadian football team season

- General manager: Jack Gotta
- Head coach: Ardell Wiegandt (fired October 5th); Jerry Williams
- Home stadium: McMahon Stadium

Results
- Record: 6–10
- Division place: 5th, West
- Playoffs: did not qualify

In the 1981 CFL season, the Calgary Stampeders finished in fifth place in the West Division with a 6–10 record and failed to make the playoffs.

== Offseason ==
=== Preseason ===
| Game | Date | Opponent | Results | | Venue | Attendance |
| Game | Date | Opponent | Score | Record | Venue | Attendance |
|---|---|---|---|---|---|---|
| A | Fri, June 5 | vs. Edmonton Eskimos | L 11–12 | 0–1 | McMahon Stadium | 29,292 |
| B | Sat, June 13 | vs. BC Lions | L 4–8 | 0–2 | Empire Stadium | 18,354 |
| C | Sun, June 21 | at Saskatchewan Roughriders | L 20–33 | 0–3 | Taylor Field | 18,599 |
| D | Fri, June 26 | vs. Winnipeg Blue Bombers | L 14–16 | 0–4 | McMahon Stadium | 28,579 |

== Regular season ==
=== Season standings ===
West Division
| Pos | Team | Pld | W | L | T | PF | PA | PD | Pts | Div | Stk |
|---|---|---|---|---|---|---|---|---|---|---|---|
| 1 | Edmonton Eskimos (C, Q) | 16 | 14 | 1 | 1 | 576 | 277 | 299 | 29 | – | |
| 2 | Winnipeg Blue Bombers (Q) | 16 | 11 | 5 | 0 | 517 | 299 | 218 | 22 | – | |
| 3 | BC Lions (Q) | 16 | 10 | 6 | 0 | 438 | 377 | 61 | 20 | – | |
| 4 | Saskatchewan Roughriders | 16 | 9 | 7 | 0 | 431 | 371 | 60 | 18 | – | |
| 5 | Calgary Stampeders | 16 | 6 | 10 | 0 | 306 | 367 | −61 | 12 | – | |

Source: "CFL.ca - Official Site of the Canadian Football League 2". Archived from the original on 2009-07-14.
(C) First round bye; (Q) Qualified for playoffs

=== Season schedule ===
| Week | Game | Date | Opponent | Results | | Venue | Attendance |
| Week | Game | Date | Opponent | Score | Record | Venue | Attendance |
|---|---|---|---|---|---|---|---|
| 1 | 1 | Sat, July 11 | at Edmonton Eskimos | L 10–30 | 0–1 | Commonwealth Stadium | 43,346 |
| 2 | 2 | Fri, July 17 | vs. Hamilton Tiger-Cats | W 26–6 | 1–1 | McMahon Stadium | 30,812 |
| 3 | 3 | Fri, July 24 | at Saskatchewan Roughriders | W 25–16 | 2–1 | Taylor Field | 26,992 |
| 4 | 4 | Fri, July 31 | vs. BC Lions | L 29–52 | 2–2 | McMahon Stadium | 32,135 |
| 5 | 5 | Sat, Aug 8 | at Hamilton Tiger-Cats | L 16–28 | 2–3 | Ivor Wynne Stadium | 20,270 |
| 6 | 6 | Fri, Aug 14 | vs. Winnipeg Blue Bombers | W 18–17 | 3–3 | McMahon Stadium | 32,349 |
| 7 | 7 | Fri, Aug 21 | vs. Ottawa Rough Riders | W 30–18 | 4–3 | McMahon Stadium | 30,276 |
| 8 | 8 | Sat, Aug 29 | at BC Lions | L 21–31 | 4–4 | Empire Stadium | 28,932 |
| 9 | 9 | Mon, Sept 7 | vs. Toronto Argonauts | W 23–5 | 5–4 | McMahon Stadium | 30,381 |
| 10 | Bye | | | | | | |
| 11 | 10 | Sat, Sept 19 | vs. Edmonton Eskimos | L 10–23 | 5–5 | McMahon Stadium | 34,657 |
| 12 | 11 | Sun, Sept 27 | at Toronto Argonauts | L 26–29 | 5–6 | Exhibition Stadium | 28,664 |
| 13 | 12 | Sun, Oct 4 | at Montreal Alouettes | L 16–22 | 5–7 | Olympic Stadium | 22,222 |
| 14 | 13 | Sat, Oct 10 | vs. Montreal Alouettes | W 29–3 | 6–7 | McMahon Stadium | 29,986 |
| 15 | 14 | Sun, Oct 18 | at Ottawa Rough Riders | L 10–21 | 6–8 | Lansdowne Park | 15,002 |
| 16 | 15 | Sun, Oct 25 | vs. Saskatchewan Roughriders | L 11–24 | 6–9 | McMahon Stadium | 33,279 |
| 17 | 16 | Sun, Nov 1 | at Winnipeg Blue Bombers | L 6–44 | 6–10 | Winnipeg Stadium | 27,489 |

== Roster ==
1981 Calgary Stampeders final roster
| Quarterbacks: 8 Jeff Knapple; 17 Bruce Threadgill; Running backs: 6 Rob Forbes; 35 Mike Higgins; 11 James Sykes; Wide receivers: 3 Alton Alexis; 18 Willie Armstead; 22 Tom Forzani; 14 John Holland; 9 Mike McTague P; Tight ends: 70 Bob Viccars | Offensive linemen: 66 Lloyd Fairbanks T; 50 Norm Hopely G; 51 Jeff Inglis T; 69 Dave Kirzinger G/T; 56 Tom Krebs G/C; 41 Mark Moors C; Defensive linemen: 52 Miles Gorrell DT; 67 Franklin King DT; 75 Scott MacArthur DE; 64 Ed McAleney DT; 63 Ronnie Paggett DE; 78 George Small DT | Linebackers: 30 Danny Bass; 25 Doug Battershill; 65 Frank Kosec; 72 Bernie Morrison; 46 Mark Nelson; 31 John Palazeti FB; 44 John Prassas; Defensive backs: 27 Al Burleson; 7 Lepoleon Ingram; 28 Terry Irvin; 37 Harry Kruger; 4 Darrell Moir WR; 32 Ray Odums; 24 Tom Reimer; 26 Merv Walker | Special teams: 2 J. T. Hay K; Injured list: 10 Willie Burden RB; Italics indicate International player |

== Awards and records ==
=== 1981 CFL All-Stars ===
- DB – Ray Odums, CFL All-Star

=== Western All-Stars ===
- DB – Ray Odums, CFL Western All-Star
- DB – Merv Walker, CFL Western All-Star
