= Bill Manchuk =

Canadian football player (1947–2025)

No. 75
- Position: Linebacker

Personal information
- Born: September 1, 1947; Edmonton, Alberta, Canada
- Died: September 12, 2025 (aged 78); Edmonton, Alberta, Canada
- Listed height: 6 ft 2 in (1.88 m)
- Listed weight: 210 lb (95 kg)

Career information
- College: Alberta

Career history
- 1971–1980: Saskatchewan Roughriders
- 1981–1982: Edmonton Eskimos

Awards and highlights
- 2× Grey Cup champion (1981, 1982); CFL West All-Star (1976)

Bill Manchuk (September 1, 1947 – September 12, 2025) was a Canadian professional football player who was a linebacker for 12 seasons with the Saskatchewan Roughriders and the Edmonton Eskimos of the Canadian Football League (CFL). He won two Grey Cups for the Eskimos. Manchuk played university football with the University of Alberta Golden Bears. He died on September 12, 2025, at the age of 78.
