= 1981 Toronto Argonauts season =

CFL team season

- Head coach: Willie Wood; Tommy Hudspeth (interim)
- Home stadium: Exhibition Stadium

Results
- Record: 2–14
- Division place: 4th, East
- Playoffs: did not qualify

Uniform

The 1981 Toronto Argonauts finished in fourth place in the East Division with a 2–14 record and failed to make the playoffs.

== Regular season ==
In spite of a 2–14 record, the Argonauts actually ended their season occupying the final playoff spot in the East (the crossover rule, intended to prevent such a weak third place team from making the playoffs, had not yet been implemented). Had the Montreal Alouettes lost their final regular season game against the Ottawa Rough Riders, they would have also finished 2–14 in which case the Argonauts would have qualified has they had scored more points in head-to-head games. However, Montreal won their last game to finish 3–13 and in third place.

=== Standings ===
East Division
Pos	Team	Pld	W	L	T	PF	PA	PD	Pts	Div	Stk
1	Hamilton Tiger-Cats (C, Q)	16	11	4	1	414	335	79	23	6–0	W1
2	Ottawa Rough Riders (Q)	16	5	11	0	306	446	−140	10	3–3	L1
3	Montreal Alouettes (Q)	16	3	13	0	267	518	−251	6	2–4	W1
4	Toronto Argonauts	16	2	14	0	241	506	−265	4	1–5	L2

Source: "CFL.ca - Official Site of the Canadian Football League 2". Archived from the original on 2009-07-14.
(C) First round bye; (Q) Qualified for playoffs

=== Schedule ===
Week	Date	Opponent	Record	Record	Venue	Attendance
1	July 2	vs. Saskatchewan Roughriders	L 18–19	0–1	Exhibition Stadium	33,243
2	July 10	at Montreal Alouettes	L 22–23	0–2	Olympic Stadium	35,281
3	July 16	vs. BC Lions	L 29–32	0–3	Exhibition Stadium	37,116
4	July 25	at Hamilton Tiger-Cats	L 13–57	0–4	Ivor Wynne Stadium	30,022
5	July 30	vs. Winnipeg Blue Bombers	L 18–21	0–5	Exhibition Stadium	36,102
6	Aug 7	at Ottawa Rough Riders	L 11–38	0–6	Lansdowne Park	22,658
7	Aug 13	vs. Edmonton Eskimos	L 12–22	0–7	Exhibition Stadium	38,268
8	Aug 23	at Saskatchewan Roughriders	L 14–38	0–8	Taylor Field	26,100
9	Bye					
10	Sept 7	at Calgary Stampeders	L 5–23	0–9	McMahon Stadium	30,381
11	Sept 13	vs. Ottawa Rough Riders	L 6–23	0–10	Exhibition Stadium	30,340
12	Sept 19	at BC Lions	L 14–45	0–11	Empire Stadium	20,196
13	Sept 27	vs. Calgary Stampeders	W 29–26	1–11	Exhibition Stadium	28,634
14	Bye					
15	Oct 11	at Winnipeg Blue Bombers	L 12–43	1–12	Winnipeg Stadium	22,757
16	Oct 17	vs. Montreal Alouettes	W 20–14	2–12	Exhibition Stadium	31,038
17	Oct 24	at Edmonton Eskimos	L 7–61	2–13	Commonwealth Stadium	46,146
18	Oct 31	vs. Hamilton Tiger-Cats	L 11–21	2–14	Exhibition Stadium	30,615

== Roster ==
1981 Toronto Argonauts final roster
Quarterbacks: 7 Condredge Holloway; 14 Dan Manucci; Running backs: 34 John Kinch; 35 Tony Lindsay; 23 John Lowe; 20 Cedric Minter; 33 Hubert Simpson; Wide receivers: 31 Josh Borger; 77 Jan Carinci; 8 Martin Cox; 32 Dave Newman; 25 Paul Pearson; 78 Don Ross; Tight ends: 72 Peter Muller	Offensive linemen: 61 Rusty Brown G; 69 Dan Ferrone G; 56 John Foubert T; 59 Bob Lubig G; 63 John Malinosky T; 57 Warner Miles T/G; 66 Harold Norfleet T; 58 George Schecterly G; 53 Doug Smith C; 50 Tom Trifaux T; Defensive linemen: 54 Bruce Clark DE; 79 Jim Corrigall DE; 45 Ron Engelson DT; 75 Gord Judges DT; 65 Reggie Lewis DE; 64 Leon Lyszkiewicz DT; 70 Brent Racette DE	Linebackers: 74 Ben Apuna; 42 Gord Elser; 68 Ron Foxx; 52 Duncan MacKinlay; 76 John Martini; 78 Tom Rusk; 71 Ron Southwick; Defensive backs: 26 Steve Ackroyd; 21 Marcellus Greene; 12 Phil Jones; 16 Zack Jones; 28 Elbert Roberts; 6 Donovan Rose; Special teams: 19 Zenon Andrusyshyn K/P; Injured list: 10 Terry Greer WR; Italics indicate International player

== Awards and honours ==
=== 1981 CFL All-Stars ===
- None

=== 1981 Eastern All-Stars ===
- RB – Cedric Minter, CFL Eastern All-Star
- P – Zenon Andrusyshyn, CFL Eastern All-Star
