= Charles Cornelius (gridiron football) =

American football player (born 1952)

No. 44, 28, 5, 24, 22
- Position: Defensive back

Personal information
- Born: July 27, 1952 (age 74); Boynton Beach, Florida, U.S.
- Listed height: 5 ft 9 in (1.75 m)
- Listed weight: 176 lb (80 kg)

Career information
- High school: Atlantic (Delray Beach, Florida)
- College: Bethune-Cookman (1972–1976)
- NFL draft: 1977: undrafted

Career history
- Miami Dolphins (1977–1978); San Francisco 49ers (1979–1980); Green Bay Packers (1981)*; Montreal Alouettes/Concordes (1981–1982); Ottawa Rough Riders (1983–1984)
- * Offseason or practice squad member only

Career NFL statistics
- Interceptions: 4
- Fumble recoveries: 4
- Stats at Pro Football Reference

Charles Edward Cornelius (born July 27, 1952) is an American former professional football player who was a defensive back in the National Football League (NFL) with the Miami Dolphins and San Francisco 49ers. He played college football for the Bethune–Cookman Wildcats. He was also a member of the Montreal Alouettes/Concordes and Ottawa Rough Riders of the Canadian Football League (CFL).

== Early life and college ==
Charles Edward Cornelius was born on July 27, 1952, in Boynton Beach, Florida. He attended Atlantic Community High School in Delray Beach, Florida.

Cornelius was a member of the Wildcats of Bethune-Cookman University from 1972 to 1976 and a three-year letterman from 1973 to 1975. He played in the first ever Black College All-American Classic on January 8, 1977.

== Professional career ==
After going undrafted in the 1977 NFL draft, Cornelius signed with the Miami Dolphins. He was waived on August 31. He re-signed with the Dolphins on September 21 and played in 13 games for the team during the 1977 season. He appeared in all 16 games in 1978, returning one interception for 21 yards and one punt for five yards. He also played in one playoff game that year.

On August 21, 1979, Cornelius was traded to the San Francisco 49ers for a 1980 eleventh round draft pick. He played in all 16 games, starting 14, for the 49ers in 1979, returning three interceptions for 54 yards while also recovering two fumbles. The 49ers finished the 1979 season with a 2–14 record. He appeared in all 16 games again, starting six, in 1980 and recovered two fumbles. Cornelius was waived on May 1, 1981.

Cornelius was claimed off waivers by the Green Bay Packers on May 12, 1981, before being waived later on August 18, 1981.

Cornelius played in eight games for the Montreal Alouettes of the Canadian Football League (CFL) in 1981, recording four interceptions for 45 yards. He appeared in all 16 games for the newly renamed Montreal Concordes during the 1982 season, totaling two interceptions for 22 yards. The Concordes finished the year with a 2–14 record.

Cornelius played in 14 games for the Ottawa Rough Riders of the CFL in 1983 and returned two interceptions for 67 yards. He appeared in eight games during his final CFL season in 1984, recording three interceptions for 22 yards.
