= Val Belcher =

American gridiron football player (1954–2010)

Profile
- Position: Guard

Personal information
- Born: July 6, 1954; Houston, Texas, U.S.
- Died: September 12, 2010 (aged 56); Ottawa, Ontario, Canada

Career information
- College: Houston
- NFL draft: 1977: 3rd round, 81st overall pick

Career history
- 1979–1983: Ottawa Rough Riders
- 1983–1984: Winnipeg Blue Bombers

Awards and highlights
- Grey Cup champion (1984); 2× Leo Dandurand Trophy (1980, 1981); First-team All-SWC (1976); 3× CFL All-Star (1980, 1981, 1982)

Val Belcher (July 6, 1954 – September 12, 2010) was an American professional football offensive guard in the Canadian Football League (CFL) for the Ottawa Rough Riders and Winnipeg Blue Bombers. He was selected in the third round of the 1977 NFL draft by the Dallas Cowboys of the National Football League (NFL). He played college football at the University of Houston.

== Early life ==
Belcher attended Reagan High School, before moving on to the University of Houston. He was a three-year starter, that began his career playing offensive guard, before moving to offensive tackle as a senior.

He was a part of the 1976 SWC championship team, receiving All-SWC and honorable mention All-American honors at the end of the season.

== Professional career ==
=== Dallas Cowboys ===
Belcher was selected by the Dallas Cowboys in the third round (81st overall) of the 1977 NFL draft to play offensive guard. He was waived on August 30, 1977.

=== Ottawa Rough Riders ===
In 1979, he signed with the Ottawa Rough Riders where he became a starter at right guard, a three-time East All-Star and a CFL All-Star (1980, 1981, 1982). He also was nominated three times for Most Outstanding Offensive lineman (1979, 1980, 1981). On July 21, 1983, he was the traded to the Winnipeg Blue Bombers.

=== Winnipeg Blue Bombers ===
He played for the Winnipeg Blue Bombers for two more seasons, before retiring in November 1984, after the team won the Grey Cup.

== Personal life ==
Following his retirement from professional football, Belcher began a highly successful career as a restaurant entrepreneur. In 1986, he founded the Lone Star Cafe restaurant with former Rough Rider teammate Larry Brune in the Ottawa suburb of Nepean. Over the years, it expanded into a franchise business and was renamed Lone Star Texas Grill, operating under the Lone Star Group of Companies. In 2020, the Lone Star Texas Grill operated in over 20 locations across southern and eastern Ontario, including seven in the Greater Ottawa Area where it originated, as a family-style restaurant specializing in wood-fire grill fajitas, authentic Tex-Mex fare and frozen margaritas. In 2008, he opened the Big Easy's Seafood & Steak House restaurant, in Ottawa (since closed).

Belcher died September 12, 2010, at the age of 56. He died from congestive heart failure while waiting for a heart transplant at the Ottawa Heart Institute. He was survived by his three children (Layne, Ashton and Meagan) and his life partner, Leslie Hines.
