= Trevor Kennerd =

Canadian football player (born 1955)

No. 3
- Position: Kicker

Personal information
- Born: December 23, 1955 (age 70); Calgary, Alberta, Canada

Career information
- College: University of Alberta

Career history
- 1980–1991: Winnipeg Blue Bombers

Awards and highlights
- 3× Grey Cup champion (1984, 1988, 1990); 2× Dave Dryburgh Memorial Trophy (1981, 1985); 2× CFL All-Star (1981, 1985)

Trevor Kennerd (born December 23, 1955) was a kicker for the Winnipeg Blue Bombers in the Canadian Football League (CFL) from 1980–1991. He was a three-time CFL All-Star (1981, 1985 Football Reporters of Canada All-Star and 1983 Coaches All-Star) and helped the Blue Bombers to three Grey Cup victories (1984, 1988, 1990), including kicking the winning field-goal in the 1988 Grey Cup. He was inducted into the Winnipeg Blue Bomber Hall of Fame in 1997 and was selected as one of the 20 Blue Bombers All-Time Greats in 2005.

While playing with the Bombers, Kennerd worked as an accounts manager for Wordsnorth Communications Services. Kennerd is currently the president of TKM Inc., a marketing communications firm in Winnipeg, Manitoba, and is the former Honorary Colonel for 435 Transport and Rescue Squadron located at 17 Wing Winnipeg.

== Electoral history ==
2008 Canadian federal election: Winnipeg South Centre
Party	Candidate	Votes	%	±%	Expenditures
Liberal	Anita Neville	16,438	42.27	+3.02	$74,911
Conservative	Trevor Kennerd	14,103	36.26	+4.77	$74,675
New Democratic	Rachel Heinrichs	5,490	14.12	−7.69	$10,465
Green	Vere Scott	2,860	7.35	+2.90	$1,774
Total valid votes/expense limit		38,891	99.61		$77,552
Total rejected ballots		151	0.39	+0.03	
Turnout		39,042	65.68	-3.81	
Eligible voters		59,444	–	–	
Liberal hold		Swing		-0.87	
