= George Brancato =

American gridiron football player and coach (1931–2019)

Profile
- Positions: Running back, defensive back

Personal information
- Born: May 27, 1931; Brooklyn, New York, U.S.
- Died: October 22, 2019 (aged 88); Ottawa, Ontario, Canada

Career information
- College: Santa Ana College; LSU

Career history

Playing
- Chicago Cardinals (1954–1955); Montreal Alouettes (1956); Ottawa Rough Riders (1957–1963)

Coaching
- Ottawa Rough Riders (1974–1984); Chicago Bruisers (1989)

Awards and highlights
- As player: Grey Cup champion (1960); CFL All-Star (1961); Second-team All-SEC (1952); As coach: Grey Cup champion (1976); Annis Stukus Trophy (1975)
- Stats at Pro Football Reference

George Brancato (May 27, 1931 – October 22, 2019) was an American/Canadian gridiron football player and coach.

Both an offensive and defensive player in college, he played five games for the Chicago Cardinals during the 1954 NFL season. He rushed the ball twice for 26 yards and caught three passes for 28 yards. In 1955 he played in the Cardinals' defensive backfield. He joined the Montreal Alouettes of the Canadian Football League (CFL) a as halfback for the 1956 season. He played defensive back for the Ottawa Rough Riders for seven seasons, occasionally playing on offense.

After his retirement, he taught phys ed at Laval High and Montreal's Loyola High School before returning to Ottawa as an assistant coach. In 1974 he was promoted to head coach after Coach of the Year Jack Gotta left to become head coach and general manager of the World Football League's Birmingham Americans. In 1975 he won the Annis Stukus Trophy as CFL's Coach of the Year after a first place 10-5-1 finish. The following season, he defeated the Saskatchewan Roughriders, 23–20, in the 64th Grey Cup. In 1981, his 5–11 Rough Riders came close to causing a massive upset in that year's Grey Cup versus the Edmonton Eskimos. After a 4–12 1984 season he was relieved of his coaching duties and appointed director of player personnel.

In 1989, he was hired to coach the Chicago Bruisers of the Arena Football League. After the team folded he served as an assistant under Ernie Stautner with the expansion Dallas Texans.

He returned to Ottawa in 1993 as Ron Smeltzer's special teams and secondary coach. That same year, he was the head coach of the UCCB Capers gridiron football team, which lasted only one season. The following season, he served as the offensive coordinator of the Shreveport Pirates. His next coaching job was as Defensive coordinator of the Anaheim Piranhas. In 1999, he returned to the AFL with the Florida Bobcats as the team's defensive coordinator. It was his final coaching job as he retired at the end of the season.
