= Larry Butler (Canadian football) =

American gridiron football player (born 1952)

Profile
- Position: Guard

Personal information
- Born: July 10, 1952 (age 74); Johnson City, Tennessee, U.S.
- Died: May 30, 2026; Alabama
- Listed height: 6 ft 2 in (1.88 m)
- Listed weight: 250 lb (113 kg)

Career information
- College: Appalachian State

Career history
- 1976–1979: Hamilton Tiger-Cats
- 1980–1981: Winnipeg Blue Bombers

Awards and highlights
- CFL's Most Outstanding Offensive Lineman Award (1981); DeMarco–Becket Memorial Trophy (1981); 3× CFL All-Star (1979, 1980, 1981); 4× CFL East All-Star (1976, 1977, 1978, 1979); 2× CFL West All-Star (1980, 1981)

Larry Butler (born July 10, 1952) is a former professional American football and Canadian football offensive lineman who played two season in the World Football League (WFL)for the 1974 New York Stars and 1975 Charlotte Hornets and six seasons in the Canadian Football League (CFL) for the Hamilton Tiger-Cats and the Winnipeg Blue Bombers. Butler attended Science Hill High School in Johnson City, Tennessee where he is a member of the Science Hill Sports Hall of Fame. He played college football at Appalachian State University where he was elected to the Athletics Hall of Fame in 1997. He won the CFL's Most Outstanding Offensive Lineman Award in 1981.
