= Tony Gabriel =

Canadian gridiron football player (born 1948)

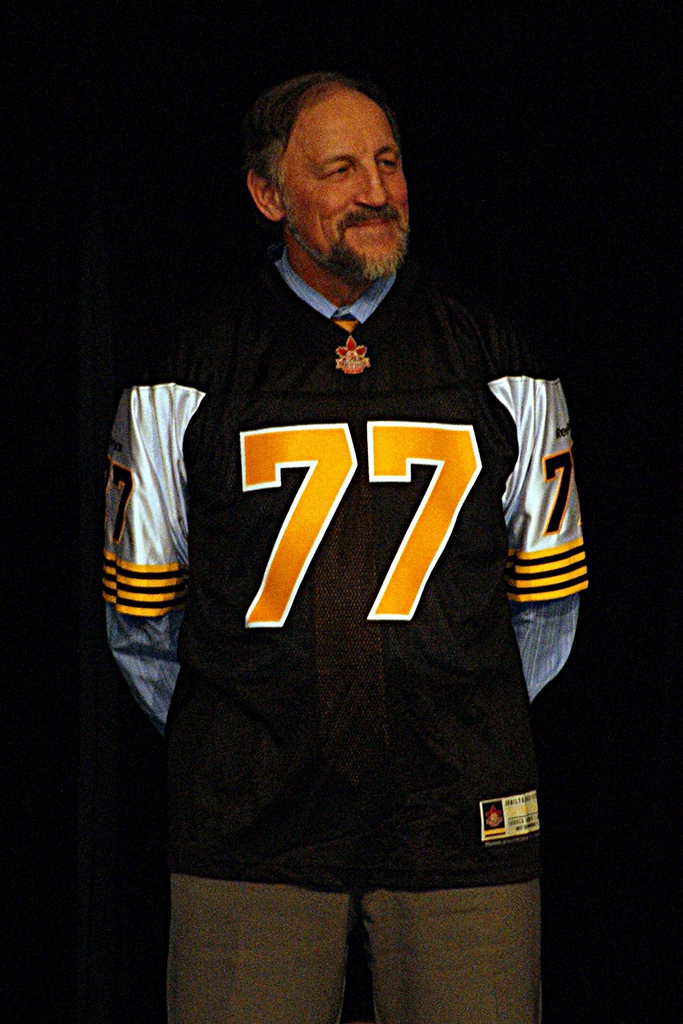
- Canada's Sports Hall of Fame Induction, November 10, 2010

No. 77
- Position: Tight end

Personal information
- Born: December 11, 1948 (age 77); Burlington, Ontario, Canada
- Listed height: 6 ft 4 in (1.93 m)
- Listed weight: 210 lb (95 kg)

Career information
- High school: Burlington Central
- College: Syracuse

Career history
- 1971–1974: Hamilton Tiger-Cats
- 1975–1981: Ottawa Rough Riders

Awards and highlights
- 2× Grey Cup champion (1972, 1976); Grey Cup Most Valuable Canadian (1976); CFL's Most Outstanding Player Award (1978); 4× CFL's Most Outstanding Canadian Award (1974, 1976, 1977, 1978); 4× Lew Hayman Trophy (1976–1978, 1981); 8× CFL All-Star (1972, 1974–1980); 9× CFL East All-Star (1972, 1974–1981); Ottawa Rough Riders #77 retired; Ottawa Rough Rider records: Most career receiving yards (7,484); Most career receptions (444)
- Canadian Football Hall of Fame (Class of 1985)

Anthony Michael Peter Gabriel (born December 11, 1948) is a Canadian former professional football tight end who played in the Canadian Football League (CFL) from 1971 to 1981. He played for both the Hamilton Tiger-Cats and the Ottawa Rough Riders. He was inducted into the Canadian Football Hall of Fame in August 1985. In 2014, he was inducted into the Ontario Sports Hall of Fame.

== Early life ==
Gabriel was born in Burlington, Ontario on December 11, 1948, and attended Burlington Central High School from 1962 to 1967. While at BCHS, Gabriel played both football and basketball. He was a member of the Junior Basketball Championship team from 1965. He was honoured in 1967, with the M.M. Robinson Gold Medal for top student athlete at BCHS.

Two memories that stick out in his mind from being a Trojan were, firstly, not making the football team in his grade ten year; and in his grade 13 year, scoring 48 points in a senior basketball game to completely outscore the entire Nelson team.

Gabriel was active throughout high school playing junior football for the Burlington Braves under the direction of famed coach Bernie Custis. From there he attended Syracuse University from 1968 to 1971 where he played split-end for coach Ben Schwartzwalder. Following his time in college, he went on to have a legendary professional football career in the Canadian Football League with the Hamilton Tiger-Cats from 1971 to 1974, and with the Ottawa Rough Riders from 1975 to 1981.

== Professional career ==
Gabriel's first CFL year with the Hamilton Tiger-Cats in 1971, was rather mediocre, with only 20 catches for 265 yards and one touchdown. With rookie quarterback Chuck Ealey in 1972 Gabriel caught 49 passes for 733 yards and 3 scores during the season and helped the team win the Grey Cup over the Saskatchewan Roughriders. After the 1974 season he joined the Ottawa Rough Riders. With Ottawa he had five seasons of over 1,000 yards receiving, including four consecutive seasons from 1975 to 1978, with the other in 1981. In 1976 and 1977 Gabriel led the CFL in receiving yards with 1320 and 1362 respectively. There would not be another Canadian receiver with this accomplishment until the Stampeders' Dave Sapunjis in 1993.

The 1976 Grey Cup game is perhaps what fans most remember of Gabriel, with his late fourth-quarter touchdown catch from Tom Clements that won the game over the Saskatchewan Roughriders. In 1978 he was awarded the Schenley Award for the Most Valuable Player in the CFL, becoming the first Canadian to win the prize in almost 10 years. This feat was not repeated until 2013. In his career Gabriel was chosen ten consecutive times as the EFC/East Division's all-star tight end from 1972 to 1981. As well he was named to the league's all star team as the tight end in 1972 and from 1974 to 1980.

The 1981 Grey Cup game saw the Rough Riders play the Edmonton Eskimos. Gabriel entered the game with a partial ligament tear in his left knee. Late in the game following a questionable penalty, Gabriel left the game when his knee finally gave out, never to play professionally again. At the time, Gabriel stood at third among the all-time receivers behind only Tom Scott and Tommy Joe Coffey. This also made him first among Canadian receivers. In his 11 seasons, he caught 614 passes for 9832 yards and 69 touchdowns.

He was inducted into the Canadian Football Hall of Fame in August 1985 and in November 2006, was voted one of the CFL's Top 50 players (#18) of the league's modern era by Canadian sports network The Sports Network/TSN.

== Highlights ==
- Sophomore Year – Syracuse University: Devil's Own Trophy: Top Student-Athlete
- Junior Year – Syracuse University: Orange Key Trophy: Outstanding Student-athlete; All-East Honours
- Senior Year – Syracuse University: Bill Horr Trophy: MVP of the Year – Syracuse U.
- Final Game: set a record for a 4 T.D. game vs. Miami
- 1972 – Won Grey Cup with Hamilton Tiger Cats
- 1974, 76, 77, 78 – Voted Schenley for Most Outstanding Canadian
- 1976 – Led the CFL in receiving yards with 1320
- 1976 – Won Grey Cup with Ottawa Rough Riders catching the winning touchdown pass in the last minute of play
- 1976 – Most Valuable Canadian in the Grey Cup
- 1977 – Led the CFL in receiving yards with 1362
- 1978 – Selected as Schenley Award winner for Most Outstanding Player in CFL
- 1972 – Selected All-East All-Star team for CFL
- 1972, 1974–1980 (inclusive) – Selected All-Canadian All-Star team for CFL
- 1985 – Inducted into The Canadian Football Hall of Fame
- 1985 – Inducted into Canada's Sports Hall of Fame
- 1986 – Inducted into Ottawa Sport Hall of Fame
- 2014 – Inducted into Ontario Sports Hall of Fame

== Awards ==
Schenley Nominations

- Outstanding Player 1977, 78 (won), 81
- Outstanding Canadian 1973, 74 (won) 1976 (won), 77 (won), 78 (won), 79, 81

Jeff Russel Trophy for Outstanding Player in the Eastern Division

- 1978

Lew Hayman Trophy for Outstanding Canadian Player in the Eastern Division

- 1976, 1977, 1978, 1981

All-Star Selections – Eastern Division

- 72–74 Hamilton
- 75–81 Ottawa

== Personal life ==
In June 2015, Gabriel retired after 35 years in the financial advising business. Tony is residing in Burlington, Ontario. He has three adult children and three grandchildren.
