= Gerald Bess =

American football player (born 1958)

No. 21
- Position: Cornerback

Personal information
- Born: May 24, 1958 (age 68); Pensacola, Florida, U.S.

Career information
- College: Tuskegee

Career history
- Hamilton Tiger-Cats (1981–1986); Ottawa Rough Riders (1986); Buffalo Bills (1987)

Career statistics
- Games played: 2
- Games started: 1
- Stats at Pro Football Reference

Gerald D. Bess (born May 24, 1958) is an American former professional football player who was a cornerback in the National Football League (NFL) and Canadian Football League (CFL). He played college football for the Tuskegee Golden Tigers.

Bess played in the NFL in 1987 for the Buffalo Bills. He played six seasons in the CFL. Bess also led the CFL with 12 interceptions in 1984, he also had interception for 102-yard return for a touchdown. Bess had tryouts with the Tampa Bay Buccaneers, Atlanta Falcons, San Diego Chargers and mini camp with the Indianapolis Colts.Gerald Bess later became a pastor at New Commandment Christian Church in Atlanta.
