= Ed Jones (defensive back) =

American football player (born 1952)

No. 26, 24
- Position: Safety

Personal information
- Born: June 29, 1952 (age 74); Long Branch, New Jersey, U.S.
- Listed height: 6 ft 0 in (1.83 m)
- Listed weight: 185 lb (84 kg)

Career information
- High school: Middletown Township (Middletown Township, New Jersey)
- College: Rutgers
- NFL draft: 1975: 9th round, 226th overall pick

Career history
- Dallas Cowboys (1975)*; Buffalo Bills (1975); Edmonton Eskimos (1976–1984); BC Lions (1984)
- * Offseason or practice squad member only

Awards and highlights
- PFWA All-Rookie Team (1975); First-team All-East (1974); Second-team All-East (1973); CFL: 5× Grey Cup champion (1978–1982); 3× CFL All-Star (1979–1981); 2× CFL West All-Star (1980, 1981); Edmonton Elks record: 2 interceptions returned for touchdowns in a game

Career NFL statistics
- Interceptions: 3
- Stats at Pro Football Reference

Ed Jones (born June 29, 1952) is an American former professional football safety for the Edmonton Eskimos and BC Lions of the Canadian Football League (CFL). He won five Grey Cups for the Eskimos and was a CFL All-Star. He also was a member of the Buffalo Bills in the National Football League (NFL). He played college football for the Rutgers Scarlet Knights and was selected by the Dallas Cowboys in the ninth round of the 1975 NFL draft.

== Early life ==
Jones grew up in Middletown Township, New Jersey, and didn't play organized football until attending Middletown Township High School in Middletown, New Jersey. He was a two-way player (running back and defensive back) that also was a key special teams performer.

In 1969, before the state championships were played, he led his team to a 14–8 upset over Toms River South High School, by returning a 67-yard kickoff to set up a touchdown run and intercepting a pass to seal the win. The team finished with a 9–0 record. He received All-state honors as a senior.

== College career ==
Jones accepted a football scholarship from Rutgers University. As a sophomore, he was switched from running back to defense during the season, earning the starting position at left cornerback, collecting 3 interceptions and 16 kickoff returns for 315 yards. He also practiced track, competing in the 100 and 220 metres.

As a junior in 1972, he was redshirted with an injured shoulder. In 1973, he was second on the team with 4 interceptions and also returned 5 kickoffs for 90 yards.

As a senior in 1974, he led the team with 7 interceptions and received All-East honors. His career interception total (14) tied the school record set by John Pollock in 1968.

In 1990, he was inducted into the Rutgers Athletics Hall of Fame.

== Professional career ==
=== Dallas Cowboys ===
Jones was selected by the Dallas Cowboys in the ninth round (226th overall) of the 1975 NFL draft, also known as the Dirty Dozen draft. He was released before the start of the season on August 11.

=== Buffalo Bills ===
On August 14, 1975, he was claimed off waivers by the Buffalo Bills. He played in 12 games (11 starts) at strong safety, while missing 2 games with an arm injury. He registered 3 interceptions, one fumble recovery and received NFL All-rookie honors. On September 7, 1976, he was released, with some in the media reporting that a contract dispute was part of the reasoning.

=== Edmonton Eskimos ===
In 1976, he was signed by the Edmonton Eskimos of the Canadian Football League after a five-day trial. He played in the last four regular-season games and in two playoff games. He was coached by Hugh Campbell and earned a reputation as one of the hardest hitters in the league.

Jones was selected 4 times to the West All-Stars (1978, 1979, 1980 and 1981) as well as 3 times to the CFL All-Stars (1979, 1980 and 1981). In 1980 he had his best season, leading the CFL with 10 interceptions (3 returned for touchdowns).

He helped the team win 5 Grey Cups during his nine-year career, finishing with 30 career interceptions, 5 fumble recoveries and 3.5 sacks. On March 12, 1984, he was traded to the BC Lions in exchange for a third-round draft pick in the 1985 CFL draft.

=== BC Lions ===
In 1984, he played in only 9 games because of torn cartilage in his right knee and recorded one interception. He was placed on the reserve list on October 19.

== Personal life ==
After his retirement, he worked in Edmonton's City Hall to provide affordable housing in the city. He served as the vice-president of the Eskimos Alumni.

In the 2014 CFL draft, his son Derek was selected in the fourth round (29th overall) by the Winnipeg Blue Bombers.
