= Tyron Gray =

American gridiron football player (born 1955)

No. 32, 21
- Position: Wide receiver

Personal information
- Born: August 4, 1955 (age 71); New York, New York, U.S.
- Listed height: 6 ft 2 in (1.88 m)
- Listed weight: 203 lb (92 kg)

Career information
- College: Washington State
- NFL draft: 1980: 12th round, 309th overall pick

Career history
- 1979–1982: BC Lions
- 1983–1984: Ottawa Rough Riders
- 1984: Saskatchewan Roughriders

Awards and highlights
- CFL West All-Star (1981)

Tyrone Gray (born August 4, 1955) is an American former professional football wide receiver in the Canadian Football League (CFL) who played for the BC Lions, Ottawa Rough Riders, and Saskatchewan Roughriders. He played college football for the Washington State Cougars.
