= Dieter Brock =

American gridiron football player and coach (born 1951)

No. 5
- Position: Quarterback

Personal information
- Born: February 12, 1951 (age 75); Birmingham, Alabama, U.S.
- Listed height: 6 ft 0 in (1.83 m)
- Listed weight: 195 lb (88 kg)

Career information
- High school: Jones Valley (AL)
- College: Auburn; Jacksonville State

Career history

Playing
- Winnipeg Blue Bombers (1974–1983); Hamilton Tiger-Cats (1983–1984); Los Angeles Rams (1985)

Coaching
- UAB (1994) Offensive coordinator; Hamilton Tiger-Cats (1995) Offensive coordinator; Ottawa Rough Riders (1996) Offensive coordinator; Alabama State (1997) Offensive coordinator; Meadowview Christian School (1998) Offensive coordinator; Edmonton Eskimos (1999) Co-offensive coordinator/Quarterbacks coach; Tusculum (2000–2004) Offensive coordinator; Cumberland (2005) Offensive coordinator; Smiths Station HS (2006) Offensive coordinator

Awards and highlights
- 2× CFL Most Outstanding Player Award (1980, 1981); 2× Jeff Nicklin Memorial Trophy (1980, 1981); 2× CFL All-Star (1980, 1981)

Career statistics
- Games played: 170
- Passing attempts: 4,535
- Passing completions: 2,602
- Completion percentage: 51.3%
- TD–INT: 210–158
- Passing yards: 34,830
- Rushing yards: 1,137
- Rushing touchdowns: 32
- Fumbles: 56
- Fumble Recoveries: 1
- Stats at Pro Football Reference
- Canadian Football Hall of Fame

Ralph Dieter Brock (born February 12, 1951) is an American former football player and coach. He played professionally as a quarterback in the Canadian Football League (CFL) and National Football League (NFL). He is best remembered as the quarterback for the CFL's Winnipeg Blue Bombers, leading the league in passing for four years. At the age of 34, Brock became the oldest rookie quarterback in NFL history, leading the Los Angeles Rams to the 1985 NFC Championship Game.

== Early life ==
Brock was born in Birmingham, Alabama. He attended Auburn University and Jacksonville State University, and graduated from Jacksonville State University in 1974.

== Professional career ==
=== Winnipeg Blue Bombers ===
After college graduation, Brock signed a one-year contract with the Winnipeg Blue Bombers and was a starting quarterback in 1975. Nicknamed "The Birmingham Rifle", Brock is only one of two Blue Bombers players to win back-to-back CFL Most Outstanding Player awards in the 1980 and 1981 CFL seasons. In 1981, Brock broke Sam Etcheverry's 1956 record of 4,723 passing yards with 4,796 yards. Brock started his illustrious professional football career as a little used back-up quarterback for the Bombers in 1974. That season, the team traded away their aging star passer Don Jonas to the Hamilton Tiger-Cats for the much younger Chuck Ealey. About midway through the 1975 season, Brock became the starter and that resulted in Ealey being sent to the Toronto Argonauts.

In 1981, Brock won his second consecutive Most Outstanding Player Award. This season was the best statistical season in his professional career. On October 3, when Winnipeg played in Ottawa, Brock set a record for pass completions in a game (41), and placed third for most consecutive passes completed in a game (16).

That year, he set the following CFL single season passing records, which have since been surpassed:

- Pass Yards (4,796)
- Pass Attempts (566)
- Pass Completions (354)

Brock posted career highs in pass percentage (62.5), pass touchdowns (32), percentage of pass attempts going for touchdowns (5.7), and pass efficiency (97.3).

Despite Winnipeg finishing second place in the West Division several times, getting to two West Division Finals, and Brock having personal success, the Blue Bombers were never able to advance to the Grey Cup during Brock's tenure.

When Brock left the Blue Bombers, he held team records in the following career passing categories: yards (29,623), completions (2,168), attempts (3,777), touchdowns (187), and interceptions (129).

=== Hamilton Tiger-Cats ===
In 1983, Brock played part of the season with Winnipeg, and finished the season with the Hamilton Tiger-Cats after he was traded there in exchange for Hamilton quarterback Tom Clements. Hamilton lost the East Division Final to the eventual Grey Cup Champion, Toronto Argonauts.

The 1984 season was Brock's last in the CFL. Brock's Tiger-Cats faced Clements' Blue Bombers in the Grey Cup. Despite early success and a 14-point lead for Hamilton, Winnipeg defeated Hamilton 47–17.

Brock ended his career CFL career without a Grey Cup victory, but had many accomplishments. Upon completion of his CFL career, Brock ranked second all-time in the following CFL career passing categories:

- Attempts (4,535)
- Completions (2,602)
- Yards (34,830)
- Touchdowns (210)

=== Los Angeles Rams ===
Brock left the CFL after ten seasons and joined the National Football League for the 1985 season. In what would be his only season playing in the NFL, Brock signed with the Los Angeles Rams as a 34-year-old rookie, setting the NFL record for oldest rookie quarterback in history. Despite the team's star running back Eric Dickerson holding out the first two games over a contract dispute, Brock led the team to a 7–0 start, a feat no other quarterback would accomplish in their first season with a team again until Ben Roethlisberger started 13–0 with the Steelers in 2004. Brock led the team to a division title, the #2 seed in the NFC playoffs, and set team rookie records for passing yards (2,658), touchdown passes (16), and passer rating (81.8) (most of his rookie passing records have since been broken). Brock's final game was the 1985 NFC Championship Game against the Chicago Bears, where he only managed 66 yards passing and lost a fumble that Wilber Marshall returned for a touchdown to close out the scoring in a 24–0 game.

In the 1986 preseason, Brock suffered an injury to his left knee on a tackle by Bo Eason of the Houston Oilers in the first exhibition game on August 2. Brock underwent arthroscopic knee surgery the following week and went on the injured reserve list the next month. Although the Rams had Steve Bartkowski as backup, they elected to deal with the Oilers and their new draft pick Jim Everett (who they had a dispute with over signing).

When Brock did tests with the team later in the month to test his knee, he aggravated his back (which he stated had been a chronic problem since 1982). Tests revealed he had a "degenerative disk in his lower back", one that could not be corrected by surgery due to the nature of his throwing position, in which he would wrench his back each time he moved to let go of a pass (cortisone injections proved futile). One of five quarterbacks on the roster, he was released by the team after the year ended; he chose to move on from playing football to a coaching career.

Brock still holds the Blue Bombers record for career passing yards with 29,623. In 2005, for the commemoration of the Blue Bombers' 75th anniversary, Brock was named one of the 20 All-Time Blue Bomber Greats. He was elected into the Canadian Football Hall of Fame in 1995.

== Career statistics ==
CFL statistics
Year	Team	Games	Passing								Rushing			
Year	Team	GP	Cmp	Att	Pct	Yds	Avg	TD	Int	Rtg	Att	Yds	Avg	TD
1974	WPG	16	12	27	44.4	176	6.5	0	2	35.4	2	6	3.0	0
1975	WPG	16	116	244	47.5	1,911	7.8	11	9	74.0	36	173	4.8	2
1976	WPG	16	223	402	55.4	3,101	7.7	17	18	75.9	46	72	1.6	2
1977	WPG	16	242	418	57.8	3,063	7.3	23	19	80.2	62	220	3.6	6
1978	WPG	16	294	486	60.5	3,755	7.7	23	18	85.0	28	47	1.7	3
1979	WPG	15	194	354	54.8	2,383	6.7	15	12	75.8	30	97	3.2	1
1980	WPG	16	304	514	59.1	4,252	8.3	28	12	94.3	43	87	2.0	4
1981	WPG	16	354	566	62.5	4,796	8.5	32	15	97.3	35	116	3.3	0
1982	WPG	16	314	543	57.8	4,294	7.9	28	15	88.9	33	123	3.7	4
1983	WPG	6	115	223	51.6	1,892	8.5	10	9	78.5	13	38	2.9	2
1983	HAM	6	114	197	57.9	1,241	6.3	8	6	77.4	14	24	1.7	2
1984	HAM	15	320	561	57.0	3,966	7.1	15	23	70.9	48	134	2.8	6
Career		170	2,602	4,535	57.4	34,830	7.7	210	158	82.8	390	1,137	2.9	32

NFL statistics
Year	Team	Games			Passing								Rushing			
Year	Team	GP	GS	Record	Cmp	Att	Pct	Yds	Avg	TD	Int	Rtg	Att	Yds	Avg	TD
1985	LARams	15	15	11–4	218	365	59.7	2,658	7.3	16	13	82.0	20	38	1.9	0
Career		15	15	11–4	218	365	59.7	2,658	7.3	16	13	82.0	20	38	1.9	0

== In popular culture ==
In every episode of the Dave Dameshek Football Program on iTunes, Dameshek and Adam Rank compete over who can make the best organic reference to Dieter Brock. He appeared as a guest on their 100th episode.
