= Larry Key =

American gridiron football player (born 1956)

No. 11
- Position: Running back

Personal information
- Born: July 12, 1956 (age 70); Inverness, Florida, U.S.
- Listed height: 5 ft 9 in (1.75 m)
- Listed weight: 185 lb (84 kg)

Career information
- High school: Citrus (Inverness, Florida)
- College: Florida State (1974–1977)
- NFL draft: 1978: 10th round, 256th overall pick

Career history
- 1978–1982: BC Lions
- 1984: Jacksonville Bulls

Awards and highlights
- 2× CFL All-Star (1979, 1981); FSU Football Hall of Fame (1984)

Larry Key (born July 12, 1956) is a former Canadian Football League (CFL) running back for the British Columbia Lions from 1978 through 1982. He was an All-Star in 1979 and 1981.

Key was the first Florida State Seminoles player to rush for 1,000 yards when he gained 1,117 in 1977. His 97-yard run in a 1976 game against VPI is the record for the longest run ever by a Seminole. Key also set four kick return records and was the national leader in all-purpose yardage in 1977. He was inducted into the FSU Football Hall of Fame in 1984.

Key joined the British Columbia Lions in 1978. He had 1,054 yards rushing and 504 yards receiving in his rookie season. Key also surpassed 1,000 yards in 1979 and 1981 in his five-year pro career.
