= Charles Williams (gridiron football) =

American gridiron football player (born 1953)

Charles Williams (born September 14, 1953) is a former Canadian football defensive back in the Canadian Football League who played for the Winnipeg Blue Bombers. He played college football for the Jackson State Tigers. He also played in the National Football League for the Philadelphia Eagles.
