= Leroy Paul =

American gridiron football player (born 1957)

Profile
- Position: Defensive back

Personal information
- Born: May 4, 1957 (age 69); United States
- Listed height: 5 ft 10 in (1.78 m)
- Listed weight: 186 lb (84 kg)

Career information
- College: Texas Southern

Career history
- 1979, 1984: Saskatchewan Roughriders
- 1980–1982: Hamilton Tiger-Cats
- 1983–1984: Toronto Argonauts
- 1984: Ottawa Rough Riders

Awards and highlights
- Grey Cup champion (1983); CFL East All-Star (1981)

Leroy Paul (born May 5, 1957) is a Canadian football player who played professionally for the Saskatchewan Roughriders, Hamilton Tiger-Cats, Toronto Argonauts, and Ottawa Rough Riders.
