= Tom Clements =

American football player and coach (born 1953)

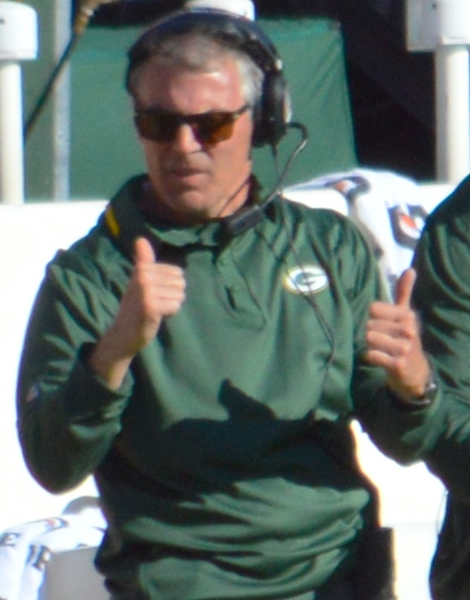
- Clements with the Green Bay Packers in 2013

No. 2
- Position: Quarterback

Personal information
- Born: June 18, 1953 (age 73); McKees Rocks, Pennsylvania, U.S.
- Listed height: 6 ft 0 in (1.83 m)
- Listed weight: 185 lb (84 kg)

Career information
- High school: Bishop Canevin (Pittsburgh, Pennsylvania)
- College: Notre Dame
- NFL draft: 1975: undrafted

Career history

Playing
- Ottawa Rough Riders (1975–1978); Saskatchewan Roughriders (1979); Hamilton Tiger-Cats (1979); Kansas City Chiefs (1980); Hamilton Tiger-Cats (1981–1982); Winnipeg Blue Bombers (1983–1987)

Coaching
- Notre Dame (1992–1995) Quarterbacks coach; New Orleans Saints (1997–1999) Quarterbacks coach; Kansas City Chiefs (2000) Quarterbacks coach; Pittsburgh Steelers (2001–2003) Quarterbacks coach; Buffalo Bills (2004–2005) Offensive coordinator; Green Bay Packers (2006–2016); Quarterbacks coach (2006–2011); Offensive coordinator (2012–2014); Assistant head coach (2015–2016); Arizona Cardinals (2019–2020) Pass game coordinator & quarterbacks coach; Green Bay Packers (2022–2024) Quarterbacks coach

Awards and highlights
- As coach: Super Bowl champion (XLV); As player: 2× Grey Cup champion (1976, 1984); 2× Grey Cup MVP (1976, 1984); CFL Most Outstanding Player (1987); 2× Jeff Russel Memorial Trophy (1981, 1987); CFL passing yardage leader (1979); 7× CFL All-Star (1975–1977, 1979, 1981, 1984, 1987); CFL Most Outstanding Rookie (1975); Frank M. Gibson Trophy (1975); National champion (1973); First-team All-American (1974)

Career CFL statistics
- TD–INT: 252–214
- Passing yards: 39,041
- Completion percentage: 60.3%
- Stats at Pro Football Reference
- Coaching profile at Pro Football Reference
- Canadian Football Hall of Fame

Thomas Albert Clements (born June 18, 1953) is an American former professional football player and coach. He played as a quarterback in the Canadian Football League (CFL) and National Football League (NFL). After his playing career, he served as an assistant coach for the Arizona Cardinals, Buffalo Bills, Pittsburgh Steelers, Kansas City Chiefs, New Orleans Saints, Green Bay Packers, and the University of Notre Dame.

== Playing career ==
=== High school ===
Clements attended Canevin Catholic High School in Pittsburgh, Pennsylvania, and graduated in 1971. Clements was a four-year letterman in both football and basketball. He was also offered a basketball scholarship at North Carolina, but decided to play football instead. He is the only athlete in Canevin history to have his jersey retired.

=== College ===
Clements was the starting quarterback for the University of Notre Dame from 1972 through 1974 and led the team to a national championship in 1973. In the Sugar Bowl against top-ranked Alabama on December 31, 1973, he had a 36-yard square-out completion to tight end Robin Weber on 3rd and 9 from his own end zone with two minutes left to secure a 24–23 victory. In 1974, Clements was fourth in the voting for the Heisman Trophy and was a first-team All-American. In the Orange Bowl on New Year's night, Notre Dame again upset undefeated Alabama to finish at 10–2 in Ara Parseghian's final season as head coach.

=== Professional ===
After graduation, Clements began a career in the Canadian Football League, quarterbacking the Ottawa Rough Riders for four seasons and winning the league's Rookie-of-the-Year award in his inaugural campaign. The next season, he helped to lead the team to what became the Rough Riders' last Grey Cup victory. After taking a powerful hit, a woozy Clements threw a pass to tight end Tony Gabriel in the end zone, a catch which became famous in defeating the Saskatchewan Roughriders.

During his time with Ottawa, Clements shared the passing duties with Condredge Holloway, from 1975 to 1977 as the quarterback getting the most playing time. In 1978, their stats were comparable, except for Holloway throwing only two interceptions to 12 by Clements.

Clements continued his career with the Saskatchewan Roughriders in 1979, but did not fare well, throwing only two touchdowns to 11 interceptions and being replaced by Danny Sanders. However, a trade to the Hamilton Tiger-Cats quickly rejuvenated Clements, and he led the CFL in passing yards with 2,803, the last to do so with less than 3,000 yards. In 1980, Clements was briefly on the roster of the NFL's Kansas City Chiefs, coached by former Montreal Alouettes head coach Marv Levy, but was the third-string quarterback for a team that stressed the running game. In 1981, Clements returned to the Tiger-Cats and threw for 4,536 yards. He improved his numbers the next season with 4,706 yards. In 1983, Clements was traded from Hamilton to the Winnipeg Blue Bombers for long-time Blue Bomber quarterback Dieter Brock. The next year, those two teams, Hamilton and Winnipeg, faced each other in the Grey Cup. Clements led the Bombers to their first Grey Cup victory since 1962. In 1986, he set a new completion percentage record with 67.5, 173 out of 256. Clements finished his playing career with Winnipeg in 1987 and was also named the league's Most Outstanding Player. He finished his CFL career with over 39,000 passing yards, 252 passing touchdowns, and a 60.35 completion percentage. In 2005, for the 75th anniversary of the Winnipeg Blue Bombers, Clements was selected one of the Bombers 20 all-time great players. In addition, in November 2006, he was voted one of the CFL's Top 50 players (#47) of the league's modern era by Canadian sports network TSN.

Clements was inducted into the Canadian Football Hall of Fame in 1994.

== Coaching career ==
In 1992, Clements was hired as quarterbacks coach for Notre Dame, where he served until 1995 under head coach Lou Holtz. After practicing law in 1996, Clements took his first NFL job, working as the quarterback coach for the New Orleans Saints from 1997 to 1999. Clements would hold the same job in 2000 with the Kansas City Chiefs, and between 2001 and 2003 with the Pittsburgh Steelers; under Clements's tutelage, the Chiefs' Elvis Grbac (in 2000) and the Steelers' Kordell Stewart (in 2001) and Tommy Maddox (in 2002) each reached the Pro Bowl.

=== Buffalo Bills ===
In 2004 and 2005 Clements served as offensive coordinator for the Buffalo Bills, but was released by the team after a front-office shakeup in which Marv Levy, his coach with the Chiefs in 1980, assumed the position of general manager and ultimately installed Dick Jauron as the team's new head coach.

=== Green Bay Packers (first stint) ===
Upon the hiring of Mike McCarthy to be the head coach of the Green Bay Packers on January 11, 2006, the Packers parted ways with several assistant coaches, and McCarthy later interviewed NFL Europe head coach Steve Logan and Clements, settling on Clements on January 28, 2006. During Clements' time as the quarterbacks coach with the Packers, he worked with starting quarterbacks Brett Favre, Aaron Rodgers, and Matt Flynn. In 2007, Favre statistically had one of his best seasons with the Packers, taking them to the NFC Championship game. Clements is also credited for assisting in the development of one of the game's elite quarterbacks in Aaron Rodgers, as the first player in NFL history to throw for 4,000+ yards during his first two years as a starting quarterback in 2008 and 2009, and winning Super Bowl XLV and Super Bowl Most Valuable Player Award in Rodgers' third year as a starting quarterback in 2010. In Week 17 of the 2011 season, after the Packers went 14–1, McCarthy chose to deactivate Rodgers to keep him healthy for the playoffs and start backup quarterback, Matt Flynn, on January 1, 2012, at Lambeau Field vs. the Detroit Lions, Flynn's second start in his career. Throughout the game, Clements worked with Flynn on the sidelines, showing him what to look for in the photos from the previous offensive series. Flynn had a record-setting performance, throwing for 480 yards and 6 touchdowns, both single game records for the Packers. On February 12, 2015, Clements role was elevated to assistant head coach with respective play-calling responsibilities. On January 26, 2017, McCarthy announced Clements' contract had expired and he would move on to pursue other opportunities.

=== Arizona Cardinals ===
On January 22, 2019, Clements was hired as passing game coordinator/quarterbacks coach for the Arizona Cardinals on the staff of new head coach Kliff Kingsbury after being out of the NFL the past two years. Clements was hired as the primary offensive assistant because no offensive coordinator on the staff was added, with Kingsbury calling plays and doing other coordinator-type duties.

In January 2021, Clements announced his retirement from coaching.

=== Green Bay Packers (second stint) ===
On February 17, 2022, Clements came out of retirement and joined the Packers as the quarterbacks coach again, this time under head coach Matt LaFleur. He worked with Rodgers for one season until the latter was traded to the New York Jets in the 2023 offseason, although Clements stayed on to assist 2020 first round pick and new starter Jordan Love. Love led the Packers back to the playoffs by throwing for 32 touchdowns and 4,159 passing yards in 17 starts.

On January 14, 2025, Clements again announced his retirement.

== Personal life ==
While still in the CFL, Clements received his Juris Doctor degree magna cum laude from Notre Dame Law School in 1986. Upon the completion of his playing career, he practiced law in Chicago for five years at the law firm Bell, Boyd & Lloyd (now K&L Gates).
