= Larry Brune =

American gridiron football player (born 1953)

No. 24
- Position: Defensive back

Personal information
- Born: May 4, 1953 (age 73); San Diego, California, U.S.
- Listed height: 6 ft 2 in (1.88 m)
- Listed weight: 202 lb (92 kg)

Career information
- High school: C.E. King (Houston, Texas)
- College: Rice
- NFL draft: 1976: 7th round, 206th overall pick

Career history
- Hamilton Tiger-Cats (1976–1977); Ottawa Rough Riders (1977–1979); Minnesota Vikings (1980); Ottawa Rough Riders (1981–1982)

Career NFL statistics
- Interceptions: 2
- Stats at Pro Football Reference

Larry Brune (born May 4, 1953) is an American former professional football player who was a defensive back in the National Football League (NFL) and Canadian Football League (CFL). He played for the Hamilton Tiger-Cats from 1976 to 1977, the Ottawa Rough Riders from 1977 to 1979 and from 1981 to 1982 and for the Minnesota Vikings in 1980. He played college football for the Rice Owls.
