= Harold Woods =

Canadian football player (born 1955)

No. 6
- Position: Defensive back

Personal information
- Born: December 24, 1955 (age 70); Richmond, Virginia, US
- Listed height: 6 ft 0 in (1.83 m)
- Listed weight: 180 lb (82 kg)

Career information
- College: West Virginia

Career history
- 1978: Saskatchewan Roughriders
- 1979–1982: Hamilton Tiger-Cats
- 1982: Toronto Argonauts
- 1983: Montreal Concordes
- 1984: Washington Federals (USFL)

Awards and highlights
- CFL All-Star (1980, 1981); CFL East All-Star (1980, 1981)

Harold Lee Woods (born December 24, 1955) is a Canadian football player who played professionally for the Saskatchewan Roughriders, Hamilton Tiger-Cats, Toronto Argonauts and Montreal Concordes.
