= Sam Platt =

American gridiron football player (born 1958)

Profile
- Position: Running back

Personal information
- Born: August 19, 1958 (age 68); Jacksonville, Florida
- Listed height: 6 ft 0 in (1.83 m)
- Listed weight: 195 lb (88 kg)

Career information
- College: Florida State

Career history
- 1981-82: Ottawa Rough Riders
- 1983: Tampa Bay Bandits

Sam Platt (born August 19, 1958) is a former gridiron football player who played with the Ottawa Rough Riders and the Tampa Bay Bandits as a running back. He scored a touchdown on a 14-yard run in the 1981 Grey Cup, giving Ottawa a 20–0 lead in the first half before Edmonton eventually came back to win the game.
