= John Priestner =

Canadian football player

Profile
- Position: Defensive back

Personal information
- Born: August 4, 1958 (age 68); Burlington, Ontario, Canada
- Listed height: 6 ft 2 in (1.88 m)
- Listed weight: 230 lb (104 kg)

Career information
- University: Western Ontario
- NFL draft: 1979: 11th round, 280th overall pick
- CFL draft: 1979

Career history
- 1980–1986: Hamilton Tiger-Cats

Awards and highlights
- CFL East All-Star (1981)

William John Priestner (born August 4, 1958) is a Canadian football player who played professionally for the Hamilton Tiger-Cats.
