= Merv Walker =

Canadian football player

Profile
- Position: Defensive back

Personal information
- Born: November 14, 1952 (age 73); Toronto, Ontario, Canada
- Listed height: 6 ft 0 in (1.83 m)
- Listed weight: 180 lb (82 kg)

Career history
- 1974–1978: Winnipeg Blue Bombers
- 1979–1982: Calgary Stampeders
- 1982: Toronto Argonauts
- 1983: Hamilton Tiger-Cats

Awards and highlights
- CFL West All-Star (1981)

Merv Walker (born November 14, 1952) is a Canadian football player who played professionally for the Winnipeg Blue Bombers, Calgary Stampeders, Toronto Argonauts and Hamilton Tiger-Cats.
