= John Glassford (Canadian football) =

Canadian football player (born 1953)

No. 76
- Position: Linebacker

Personal information
- Born: June 5, 1953 (age 73)
- Listed height: 6 ft 2 in (1.88 m)
- Listed weight: 220 lb (100 kg)

Career information
- College: Wilfrid Laurier University

Career history
- 1977–82: Ottawa Rough Riders

Awards and highlights
- Grey Cup Most Valuable Player (1981)

John Glassford (born June 5, 1953) is a former award-winning linebacker in the Canadian Football League (CFL) playing 6 seasons with the Ottawa Rough Riders.

A graduate of Wilfrid Laurier University, Glassford played on the Golden Hawks' Yates Cup winning team in 1973. He joined Ottawa in 1977 and played 96 games, never missing a regular season game. In 1981 he played in the classic Grey Cup game, a Rider last second loss to the Edmonton Eskimos and was named Grey Cup Most Valuable Player. In 1981 he had one QB sack, a pass reception for 5 yards and a 2-point convert. He intercepted 2 passes in 1982.

He was inducted into the Wilfrid Laurier University Golden Hawk Hall of Fame in 1991. He now owns Glassford Chrysler in Ingersoll, Ontario.
