= 69th Grey Cup =

1981 Canadian Football championship game

Edmonton Eskimos	Ottawa Rough Riders
(14–1–1)	(5–11)
26	23
Head coach: Hugh Campbell	Head coach: George Brancato
	1	2	3	4	Total
Edmonton Eskimos	0	1	14	11	26
Ottawa Rough Riders	13	7	0	3	23
- Date: November 22, 1981
- Stadium: Olympic Stadium
- Location: Montreal
- Most Valuable Player: Offence: J.C. Watts, QB (Rough Riders); Defence: John Glassford, LB (Rough Riders)
- Most Valuable Canadian: Neil Lumsden, RB (Eskimos)
- Referee: Bill Dell
- Attendance: 52,478

Broadcasters
- Network: CBC, CTV, SRC

The 69th Grey Cup was played on November 22, 1981, at the Olympic Stadium in Montreal, Quebec in front of 52,487 fans. The 1981 Grey Cup game is considered to be one of the ten best Grey Cup games of all time. CFL football fans saw an unexpectedly exciting game, as the 22.5 point underdog Ottawa Rough Riders, sporting a woeful record of 5–11 (the worst record in league history by any Grey Cup finalist team), came within three seconds of beating the Edmonton Eskimos, who had won the championship the last three straight years. The Eskimos, with a 14–1–1 record, were almost the victims of what would have been the biggest upset in the history of the Grey Cup. With the win, the Eskimos became the first team in league history to win the Grey Cup four consecutive times.

This was the final appearance in the Grey Cup game for the Ottawa Rough Riders, who folded in 1996. A team from Ottawa would not return to the Grey Cup until 2015, when the second-year Redblacks faced off, incidentally, against the Edmonton Eskimos. Canadian Football Hall of Fame legends Tom Wilkinson (Edmonton) and Tony Gabriel (Ottawa) played their final game in the 69th Grey Cup as did veteran Edmonton centre Bob Howes. Future US Congressman J.C. Watts was Ottawa's quarterback. He won the Grey Cup Most Valuable Player (Offensive) award.

== Box Score ==
First quarter

Ottawa – FG – Gerry Organ 34 yards
Ottawa – FG – Gerry Organ 37 yards
Ottawa – TD – Jim Reid 1-yard run (Gerry Organ convert)

Second quarter

Ottawa – TD – Sam Platt 14-yard run (Gerry Organ convert)
Edmonton – Single – Dave Cutler 24 yards missed Field Goal

Third quarter

Edmonton – TD – Jim Germany 2-yard run (Dave Cutler convert)
Edmonton – TD – Warren Moon 1-yard run (Dave Cutler convert)

Fourth quarter

Ottawa – FG – Gerry Organ 28 yards
Edmonton – TD – Warren Moon 1-yard run (Marco Cyncar 2 point convert pass from Moon)
Edmonton – FG – Dave Cutler 27 yards

Teams	1 Q	2 Q	3 Q	4 Q	Final
Edmonton Eskimos	0	1	14	11	26
Ottawa Rough Riders	13	7	0	3	23

== Game summary ==
Ottawa unexpectedly built up a lead of 20 to 1 at halftime on touchdowns by Jim Reid and Sam Platt and two Gerry Organ field goals. Edmonton fought back in the second half with short touchdown runs by Jim Germany and Warren Moon. After another Ottawa field goal, Moon scored his second rushing touchdown and hit Marco Cyncar for a 2-point conversion to tie the game at 23.

The most controversial play in this closely fought game came in the last 4 minutes. Ottawa tight end Tony Gabriel, limping down the field with torn knee ligaments, caught a vital 20-yard pass while battling Eskimo defender Gary Hayes. The officials called pass interference penalties on both players, wiping out the gain. Gabriel was stunned and argued his case on field, to no avail. Gabriel, his knee finally disabling him and denied this last moment of greatness, would not play again.

Ottawa was soon forced to punt and lost the game on a 27-yard field goal by Dave Cutler with three seconds left.
