= 1981 CFL draft =

Canadian football draft

The 1981 CFL draft composed of seven rounds where 81 Canadian football players were chosen from eligible Canadian universities and Canadian players playing in the NCAA. A total of 18 players were selected as territorial exemptions, with every team making at least one selection during this stage of the draft. Through a trade with the Saskatchewan Roughriders, the Calgary Stampeders selected first overall in the draft.

Frank Kosec was selected first overall by Saskatchewan.

== Territorial exemptions ==
Saskatchewan Roughriders Eugene Larocque DT Utah

Toronto Argonauts Hazen Carinci DB Simon Fraser

Toronto Argonauts Dan Ferrone G Simon Fraser

Toronto Argonauts Bernie Pickett TB Wilfrid Laurier

Toronto Argonauts Bob Bronk TB Queen's

Ottawa Rough Riders John Park TE Bowling Green

Ottawa Rough Riders Ian Beckstead TE Richmond

Montreal Alouettes Marc Lacelle TB McGill

British Columbia Lions Rob Smith G Utah State

British Columbia Lions Rick Klassen G Simon Fraser

Calgary Stampeders Scott MacArthur DE Calgary

Calgary Stampeders Shawn Beaton DL Boise State

Calgary Stampeders Randy Besler G Northeast Missouri

Calgary Stampeders Randy Fournier DT Cincinnati

Winnipeg Blue Bombers Perry Kuras G North Dakota

Hamilton Tiger-Cats Bill Howard C Western Ontario

Edmonton Eskimos Sean Kehoe TB Alberta

Edmonton Eskimos Joshua Borger WR Calgary

== 1st round ==
= CFL Division All-Star	= CFL All-Star	= Hall of Famer

Pick #	CFL team	Player	Position	School
1	Calgary Stampeders	Frank Kosec	LB	Waterloo
2	Toronto Argonauts	Tom Trifaux	T	Calgary
3	Ottawa Rough Riders	Maurice Doyle	RB	Toronto
4	Montreal Alouettes	Chris Walby	DT	Dickinson State
5	BC Lions	Nelson Martin	WR	Seneca
6	Calgary Stampeders	Mike Wolfram	SB	Alberta
7	Toronto Argonauts	Tom Bray	DT	Bishop's
8	Toronto Argonauts	Ronald Engleson	DT	Simon Fraser
9	Edmonton Eskimos	Rob Logan	DE	Waterloo

== 2nd round ==
10. Saskatchewan Roughriders Hazen Henderson DB Simon Fraser

11. Toronto Argonauts Gord Elser LB Calgary

12. Ottawa Rough Riders Don Burns WR Ottawa

13. Montreal Alouettes Samuel Marshall DB Simon Fraser

14. Toronto Argonauts Warner Miles OL Ottawa

15. Montreal Alouettes Fred Prinzen LB Queen's

16. Winnipeg Blue Bombers Dave Brown WR Alberta

17. Calgary Stampeders Terry Lehne DB Saskatchewan

18. Edmonton Eskimos Mike Reid C Ottawa

== 3rd round ==
19. Saskatchewan Roughriders Don Busto FL/DB Simon Fraser

20. Toronto Argonauts Dan Dominico WR Western Ontario

21. British Columbia Lions Jamie Armstead DB Calgary

22. Montreal Alouettes Joe Kuklo DB Simon Fraser

23. British Columbia Lions Larry Priestnall TB Acadia

24. Calgary Stampeders Kari Suutari LB Wisconsin

25. Winnipeg Blue Bombers Hubert Walsh TB Acadia

26. Hamilton Tiger-Cats Jeff Arp G Western Ontario

27. Edmonton Eskimos Scott Essery TE Windsor

== 4th round ==
28. Saskatchewan Roughriders David Pearson DT Western Ontario

29. Ottawa Rough Riders John Lowe TB Guelph

30. Ottawa Rough Riders Eric Boss DT Toronto

31. Montreal Alouettes Dean Claridge DE British Columbia

32. British Columbia Lions Ed Jones DB Simon Fraser

33. Calgary Stampeders Ted Kozik DE Saint Mary's

34. Winnipeg Blue Bombers Dick Rigelhof LB North Dakota

35. Hamilton Tiger-Cats Rob Sommerville DB Waterloo

36. Edmonton Eskimos Ron Lammer DL Alberta

== 5th round ==
= CFL Division All-Star	= CFL All-Star	= Hall of Famer

Pick #	CFL team	Player	Position	School
37	Saskatchewan Roughriders	Vic Stevenson	OT	Calgary
38	Toronto Argonauts	Gord Goodwin	RB	Calgary
39	Ottawa Rough Riders	Larry Ring	DB	Bishop's
40	Montreal Alouettes	Murray Wenhardt	OT	Saskatchewan
41	BC Lions	Frank Roberto	RB	Simon Fraser
42	Calgary Stampeders	Dan Pavlicik	OT	Concordia
43	Winnipeg Blue Bombers	Martin Pardell	RB	Alberta
44	Hamilton Tiger-Cats	Rick Maloney	OT	Western Ontario
45	Edmonton Eskimos	Robin Lawrence	DB	Alberta

== 6th round ==
46. Saskatchewan Roughriders John Celestino DT Windsor

47. Toronto Argonauts Jeff Hale T Guelph

48. Ottawa Rough Riders Anthony Refosso T Toronto

49. Montreal Alouettes Dominic Vetro WR Wilfrid Laurier

50. British Columbia Lions David Thornhill WR Bishop's

51. Calgary Stampeders Jay Triano DB Simon Fraser

52. Winnipeg Blue Bombers Hugh Goodman DL Acadia

53. Hamilton Tiger-Cats Ian Troop G Wilfrid Laurier

54. Edmonton Eskimos Wyatt Wishart DT Concordia

== 7th round ==
55. Saskatchewan Roughriders Wayne Stremel LB Simon Fraser

56. Toronto Argonauts Kevin Malone DB Queen's

57. Ottawa Rough Riders Rob Ball DB Queen's

58. Montreal Alouettes Dave Ridgway K Toledo

59. British Columbia Lions Ed Hole T Alberta

60. Calgary Stampeders Wayne Harris Jr. LB Calgary

61. Winnipeg Blue Bombers Peter Martell TB St. Francis Xavier

62. Hamilton Tiger-Cats Bill Paul TB Sheridan

63. Edmonton Eskimos Craig Mallender TB Windsor
