= Peter Martell (Canadian football) =

Profile
- Positions: Running back, Linebacker

Personal information
- Born: April 23, 1959; Sydney, Nova Scotia
- Died: July 31, 2016 (aged 57); Dartmouth, Nova Scotia
- Listed height: 6 ft 1 in (1.85 m)
- Listed weight: 215 lb (98 kg)

Career information
- University: St. Francis Xavier
- CFL draft: 1981: 7th round, 61st overall pick

Career history
- 1981: Winnipeg Blue Bombers
- 1982–1983: Montreal Concordes

Peter George Martell (April 23, 1959 – July 31, 2016) was a Canadian professional football player who played for the Winnipeg Blue Bombers and Montreal Concordes of the Canadian Football League (CFL). Prior to his CFL career, he played at St. Francis Xavier University. He died of Huntington's disease in 2016.
