= 2015 Pan American Games =

17th edition of the Pan American Games

XVII Pan American Games
- Logo of the 2015 Pan American Games
- Host city: Toronto
- Country: Canada
- Motto: United We Play
- Nations: 41
- Athletes: 6,123
- Events: 364 in 36 sports
- Opening: July 10
- Closing: July 26
- Opened by: Governor General David Johnston
- Cauldron lighter: Steve Nash
- Main venue: Pan Am Dome

The 2015 Pan American Games (French: Jeux panaméricains de 2015), officially the XVII Pan American Games (French: XVII Jeux panaméricains) and commonly known as the Toronto 2015 Pan-Am Games, were a major international multi-sport event celebrated in the tradition of the Pan American Games, as governed by Pan American Sports Organization (PASO). The games were held from July 10 to 26, 2015 in Toronto, Ontario, Canada; preliminary rounds in certain events began on July 7, 2015. These were the third Pan American Games hosted by Canada, and the first in the province of Ontario. The Games were held at venues in Toronto and 17 other Golden Horseshoe communities. The Pan American Games and 2015 Parapan American Games were organized by the Toronto Organizing Committee for the 2015 Pan and Parapan American Games (TO2015).

The Games hosted 6,123 athletes and 3,396 team officials representing 41 National Olympic Committees (NOCs) in the Americas, marking the largest multi-sport event hosted in Canada, in terms of athletes competing. A record of 46 percent of competitors were women, the most ever for any multi-sport event. 364 events were contested in 36 sports, which included the 28 sports contested at the 2016 Summer Olympics in Rio de Janeiro; certain sports also served as qualification paths for these Olympics. Canoe slalom and golf made their Pan American Games debut, as well as women's competitions in baseball, canoeing and rugby sevens.

In 2019, the organizing committee reported that the games came in under budget by $38 million and left a strong legacy for the region with a legacy fund of over $60 million to maintain these structures for twenty years after the Games were held (i.e., until 2035).

== Bidding process ==
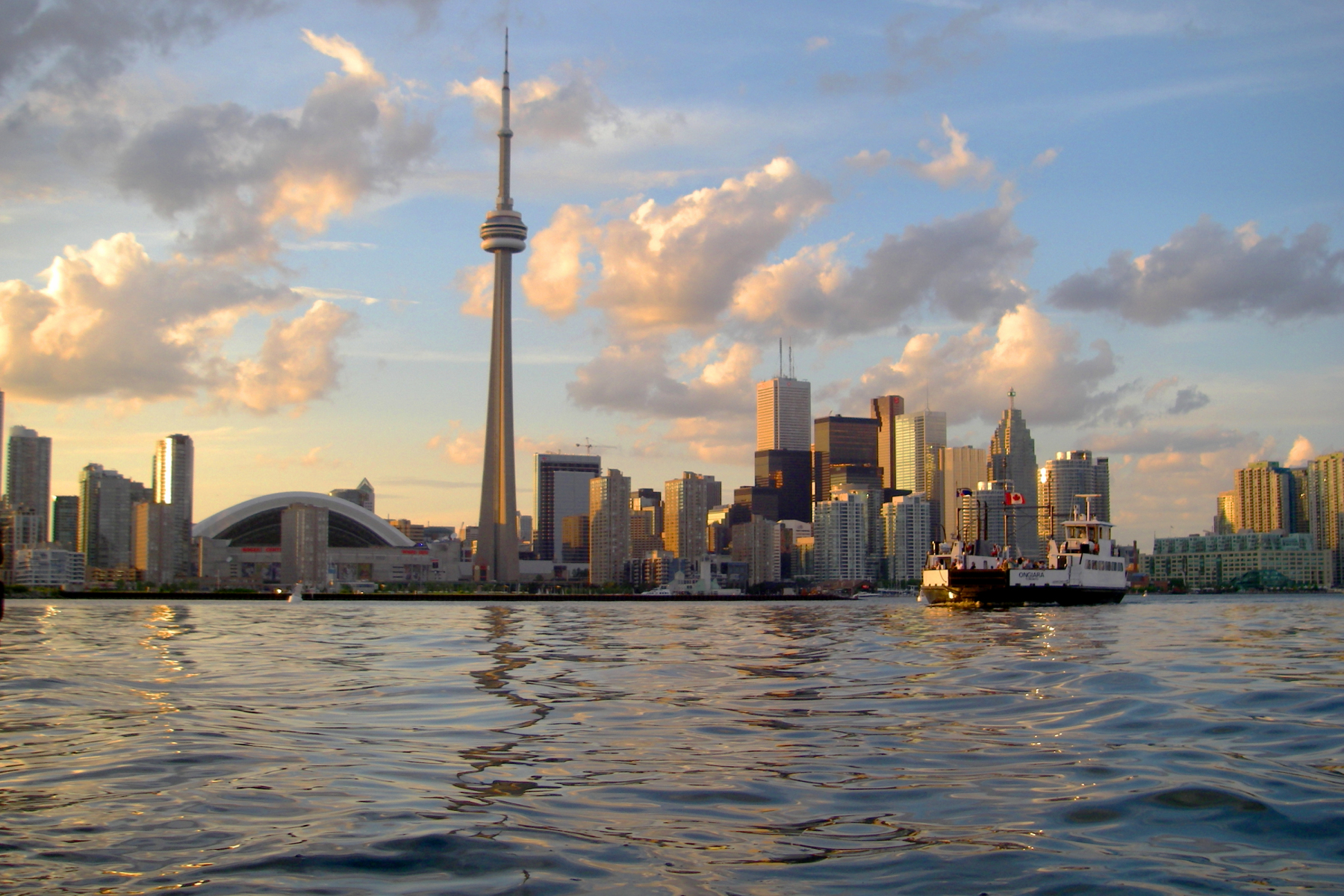
Toronto was selected by the Canadian Olympic Committee as the official bid city from Canada for the 2015 Pan American Games

The Canadian Olympic Committee (COC) originally expressed interest in bidding for the games in November 2007. In April 2008, after discussions with all three levels of government, the COC chose to support Toronto and the surrounding region as the Canadian candidate. No other Canadian city was given a chance to bid in a domestic race, and thus Toronto was selected without a vote. Toronto's interest in bidding came after failing to land the 1996 Summer Olympics and the 2008 Summer Olympics, which were held in Atlanta and Beijing, respectively, instead.

On February 23, 2009, Toronto City Council and Hamilton City Council approved the bid and confirmed their intentions to support the successful hosting of the event. The official bid book document was submitted to the Pan American Sports Organization (PASO) on May 27, 2009.

PASO made an evaluation visit to Toronto between August 30 and 31, 2009. The team analysed the candidate city features and provided its feedback back to voting members of PASO. The evaluation committee was headed by Julio Maglione, a member of the IOC representing Uruguay and the head of Fédération Internationale de Natation (FINA), the international swimming federation, later renamed World Aquatics in 2023. After the visit, Maglione said, "Toronto has all the conditions to play host to the Pan American Games."

=== Host city election ===
Toronto won the bidding process to host the Pan and Parapan American Games by a vote of the Pan American Sports Organization on November 6, 2009, at the PASO Session held in Guadalajara, Mexico. The result was announced by PASO President Mario Vázquez Raña. Toronto faced two other finalists shortlisted Lima, Peru (which later won the rights to host the 2019 Pan American Games), and Bogotá, Colombia. Toronto earned 33 votes, while contesting candidate cities Lima and Bogotá received 11 and 7 votes, respectively. Then-Mayor of Toronto Rob Ford and Canadian Minister of Sport Bal Gosal received the Pan American Sports Organization flag during the closing ceremony of the 2011 Pan American Games in Guadalajara.

2015 Pan American Games bidding results
City	NOC	Round 1
Toronto	Canada	33
Lima	Peru	11
Bogotá	Colombia	7

== Development and preparation ==
=== Venues ===
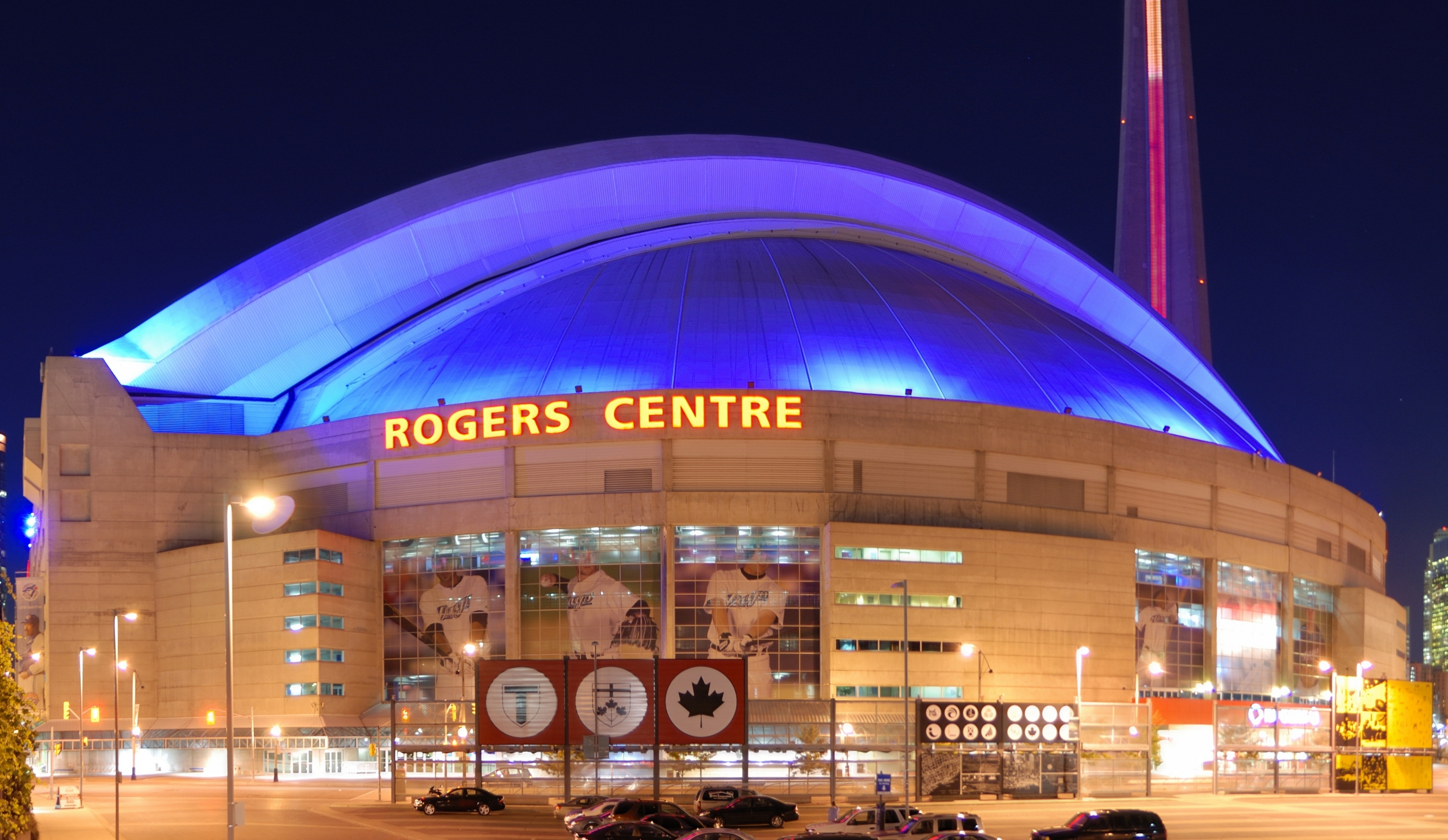
Rogers Centre (temporarily renamed Pan Am Dome for the duration of the Games) hosted the opening and closing ceremonies

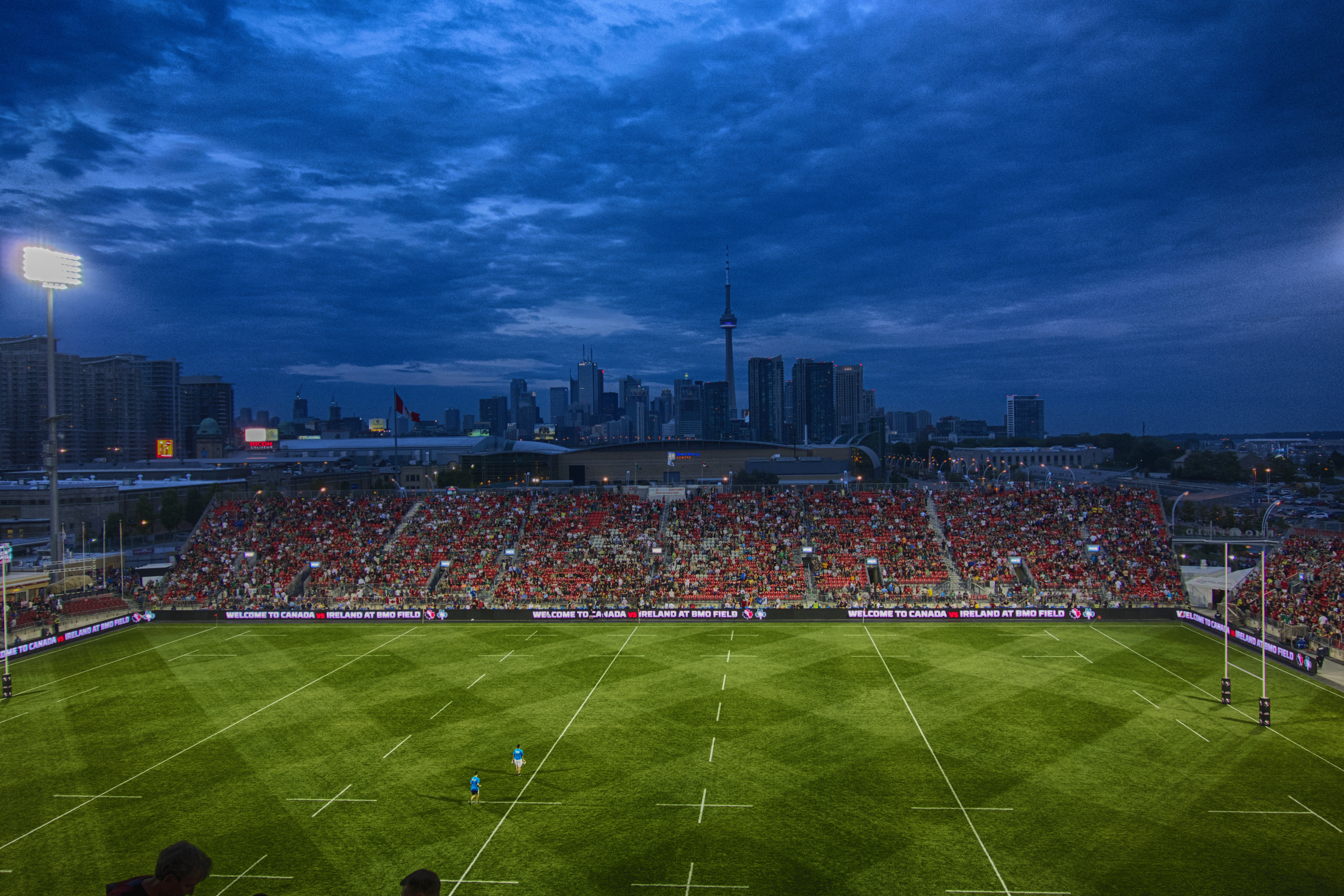
BMO Field (temporarily renamed Exhibition Stadium for the duration of the Games) staged the rugby sevens competition

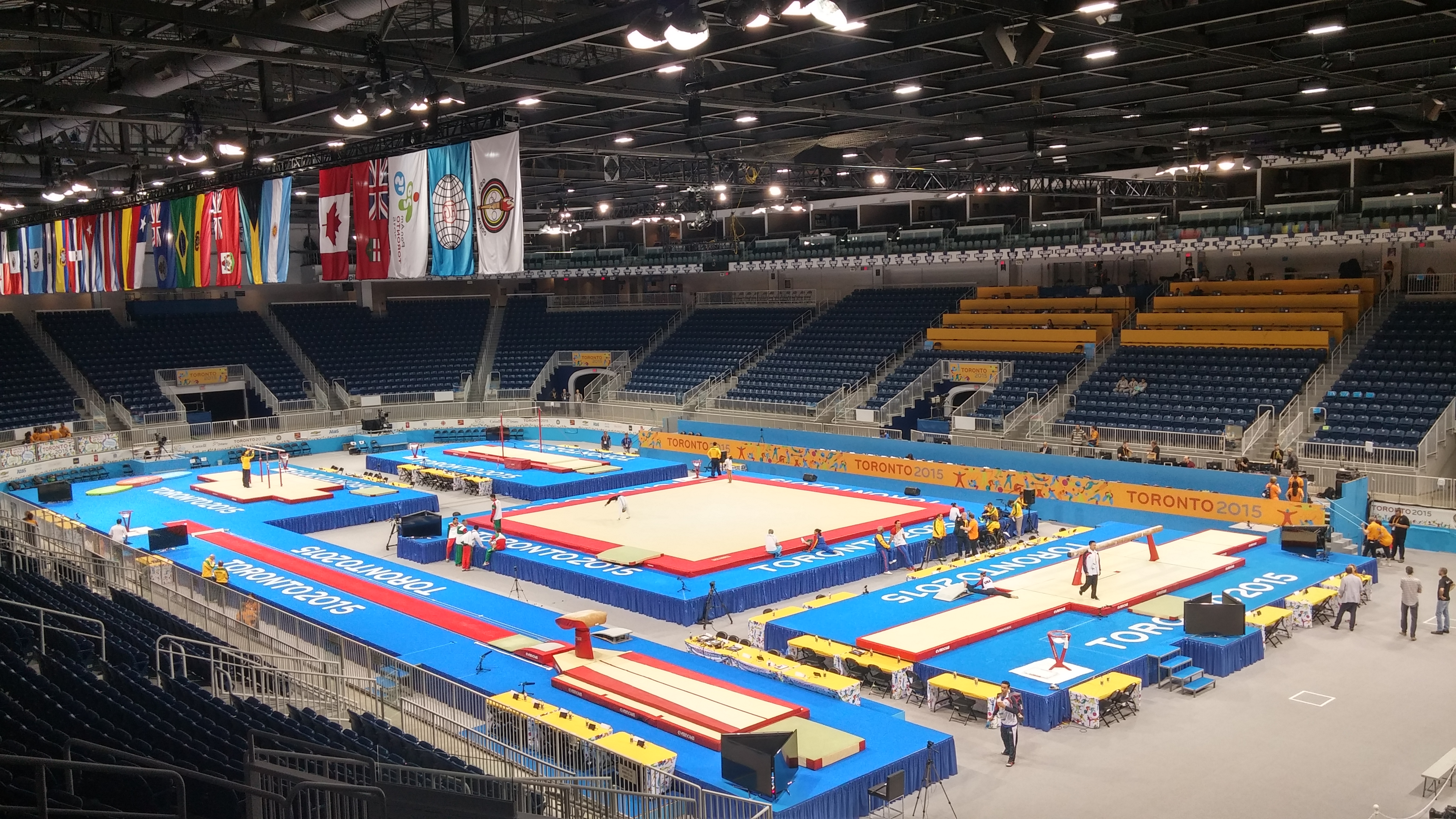
The Ricoh Coliseum (Toronto Coliseum), in Toronto, was the venue for the gymnastics competitions

The 2015 Pan American Games used a mixture of new venues and existing and temporary facilities, some of them in well-known locations such as Exhibition Place. After the Games, some of the new facilities will be reused in their games time form, while others will be resized. A total of 30 competition venues across 14 municipalities were used for competition. Ten of these venues were newly built, while fifteen were renovated to stage the games.

Toronto was one of the most populous cities in history to hold the Pan American Games. In July, Toronto has an average mean temperature of 22.3 °C (72.1 °F) and afternoon maximum average of 26.6 °C (79.9 °F) The average humidity is 74 percent, and the city (downtown area) averages five days with the temperature exceeding 30 °C (86 °F) and about 65 millimetres (2.6 in) of precipitation, mostly brief periods of showers and occasional thunderstorms. Toronto's elevation is 112 m (367 ft 5 1/2 in) above sea level on average, though the city has many steep hills and deep ravines, the largest ravine system of any city in the world.

In January 2012, the Toronto Organizing Committee for the 2015 Pan and Parapan American Games (TO2015) announced that sixty percent of the venues that had been proposed would be dropped in favour of a clustering system seen at other multi-sport events such as the 2012 Summer Olympics in London.

The opening and closing ceremonies were held at Rogers Centre (renamed "Pan Am Dome" due to sponsorship rules). Some of the competition venues in the Toronto area included BMO Field (renamed "Exhibition Stadium" due to sponsorship rules), the Pan Am/Parapan Am Fields, the Enercare Centre and the Toronto Pan Am Sports Centre, while the road cycling and marathon events include High Park west of Exhibition Place. Competition venues outside Toronto city limits included Tim Hortons Field in Hamilton, Hershey Centre in Mississauga, Markham Pan Am Centre in Markham, the GM Centre in Oshawa, and the Royal Canadian Henley Rowing Course in St. Catharines.

=== Financing ===
The Toronto 2015 Organizing Committee and three jurisdictions of government were to spend about CA$672 million in upgrading and building new venues in the region. An additional CA$760 million was to be spent in operating expenses such as venue management and marketing. The Canadian federal government was expected to provide CA$500 million in funding for the games, while the City of Toronto's contribution was to be CA$86 million. Other municipalities which are hosting sporting events were to cover CA$205 million of the costs. All remaining costs were covered by the Government of Ontario. Revenue from the games were expected to cover ten percent of the cost to stage the games. The organizing committee expected to generate CA$172 million in revenue. In addition, CA$709 million was to be spent on building an athletes' village in the West Don Lands area of Toronto. A further CA$239 million was budgeted on security, while transportation costs were around CA$90 million. In 2014, the Ontario government provided an additional CA$74 million to expand the torch relay, provide additional live broadcasting of events and other features. Therefore, the total spent was expected to be CA$2.57 billion, the highest-ever cost of a single Pan Am Games.

In 2016, Ontario auditor-general Bonnie Lysyk issued a report suggesting that the games were over-budget by CA$342 million. However, in 2019, the organizing committee found that the games were actually CA$38 million under budget, and left a legacy of $60 million to continue to maintain the buildings and facilities built for the games.

=== Infrastructure ===
The Union Pearson Express, an airport rail link from Toronto Pearson International Airport to Union Station, started full-time service on June 6, 2015. The games created a deadline for a project that had been stalled for years. In addition, a new GO Transit train station in Hamilton at James Street North, West Harbour GO Station, opened in time for the games.

In October 2013, an expansion of the Pan Am site was announced to help complete 250 kilometres (160 mi) in gaps in Ontario's Trans Canada Trail and connect communities from Ottawa to Windsor and Fort Erie to Huntsville in time for the games. Connections to the Waterfront Trail were expected to be expanded and complete gaps in the trail. Premier of Ontario Kathleen Wynne announced "The province is investing more than CA$3.5 million in Pan Am / Parapan Am Trails to help create a continuous trail of more than 2,000 kilometres (1,200 mi)."

=== Athletes' Village ===
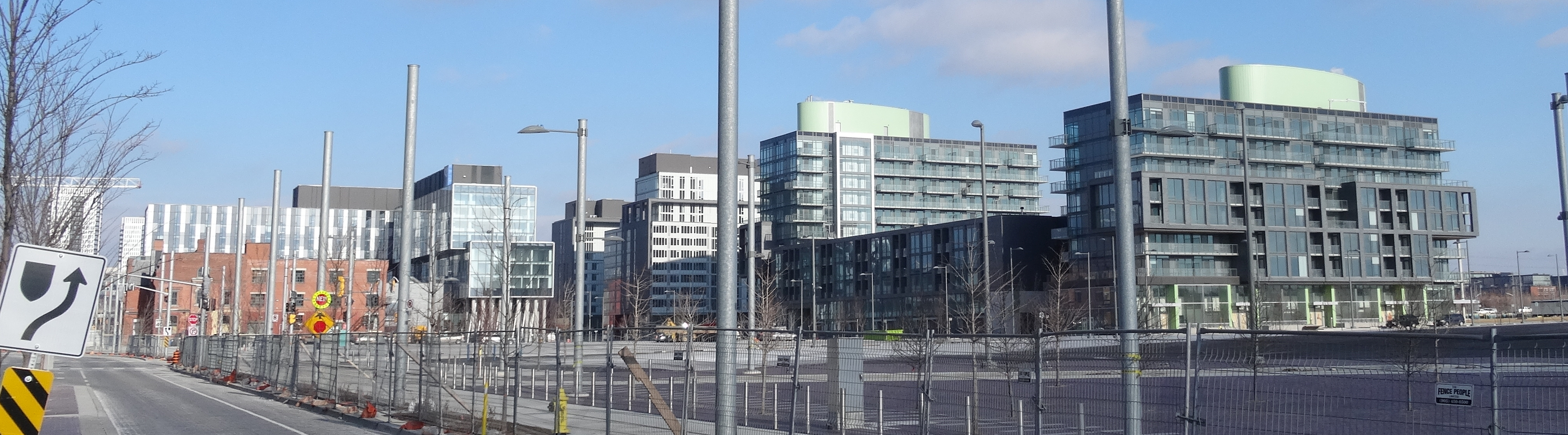
The 2015 Pan American Games Athletes' Village in January 2015

The Athletes' village cost $735 million CAD and had the capacity to hold up to 7,200 athletes and officials. After the games, the village was converted to 746 market-priced condominiums, 41 market-priced town homes, 250 affordable-rent apartments, 257 student dormitory units for George Brown College, office and retail units, and a YMCA recreation centre. The Athlete's Village was located in the West Don Lands along Front Street East between Bayview Avenue and Cherry Street in Toronto. The development was certified LEED Gold. Five satellite villages (all hotels and university residences) were also used to house athletes that were competing in venues far from the main village.

==== Satellite villages ====
Village	Location	Sports
Horseshoe Resort	Oro-Medonte	Cycling (mountain biking)
Pinestone Resort	Dysart et al (Haliburton)	Canoeing (slalom)
Nottawasaga Inn	New Tecumseth (Alliston)	Equestrian; Shooting
McMaster University	Hamilton	Football
Brock University	St. Catharines	Canoeing (sprint); Rowing

=== Volunteers ===
The organization committee expected 23,000 volunteers to be required for Pan Am and Parapan Am Games. Event producer, Carlos Patino, along with a panel of judges, carried out auditions in the second-floor gym at Ryerson University, renamed Toronto Metropolitan University in 2022, with the goal of filling roughly 600 performer spots. Those selected would be in charge of various roles such as carrying placards at medal presentations. Many strived to be on the Pan Am stage. Age, gender and Toronto's multicultural communities were embraced and encouraged. Robyn Deverett, actor and physiotherapist among the auditioning hopefuls, said it best: "It's going to be...one of those once-in-a-lifetime opportunities." Over 63,000 applicants applied to become a volunteer. A total of 16,146 volunteers participated as part of the Games.

=== Ticketing ===
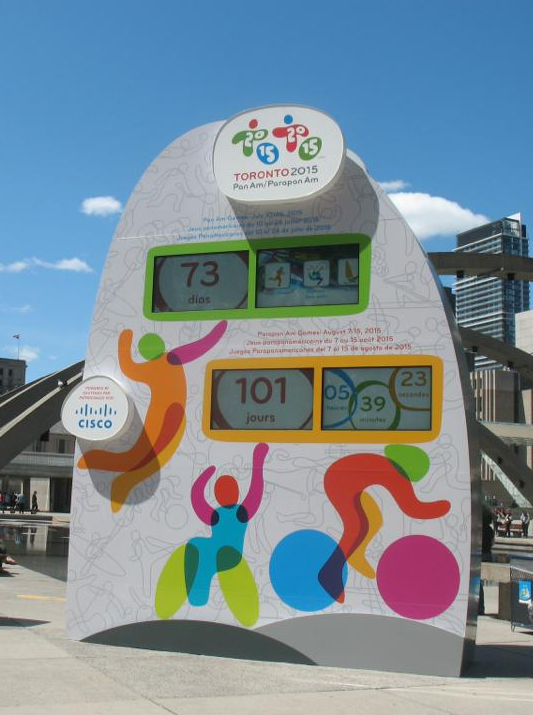
Countdown clock in Nathan Phillips Square

Ticket sales began on September 15, 2014, for high-demand events such as the ceremonies, via a lottery. Purchasers would find out if they received tickets in November 2014. General sales of tickets began on 8 December 2014. The Games had 1.4 million tickets for sale, with over 75 percent of them priced under CA$45. A special report from the Office of the Auditor General of Ontario concluded that "TO2015 eventually sold over 1.1 million of the 1.4 million available tickets—over 1 million for the Pan Am Games (85 percent of the total available) and 89,000 for the Parapan American Games (49 percent of the total available)."

=== Countdown ===
The one-year countdown took place in Nathan Phillips Square in Downtown Toronto on July 10, 2014, in which a countdown clock was unveiled. A Cirque du Soleil performance was also held there.

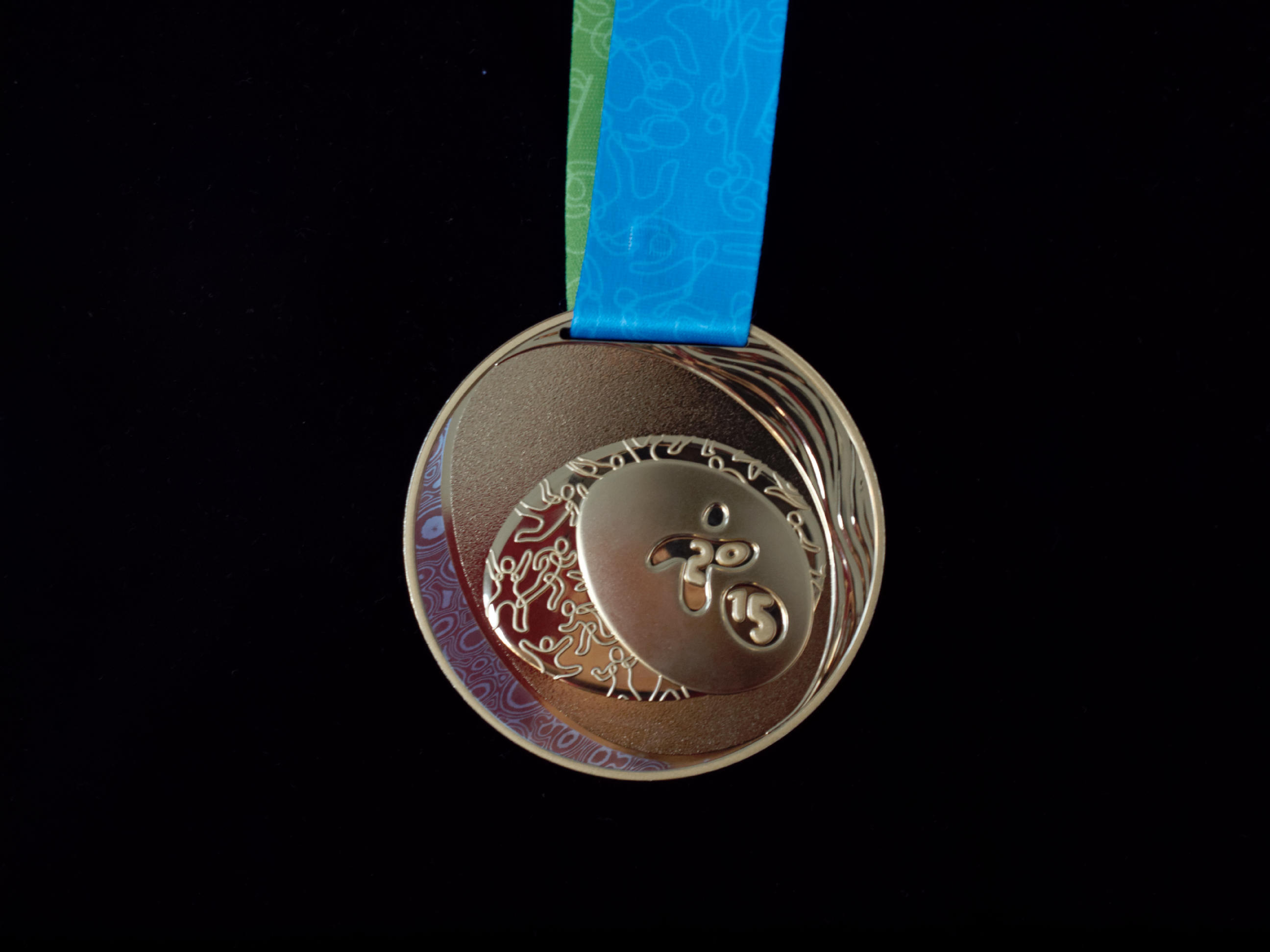
Gold medal

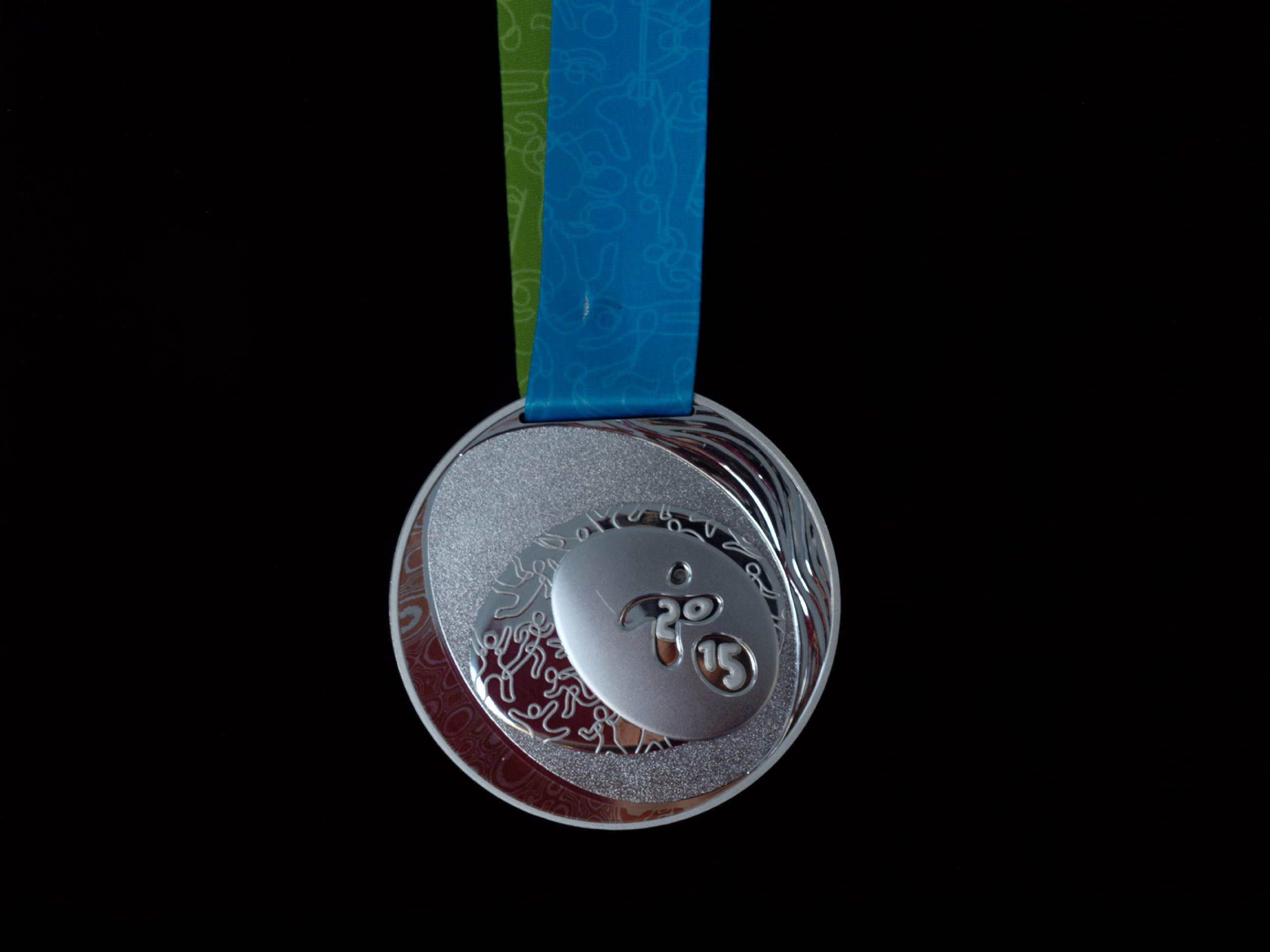
Silver medal

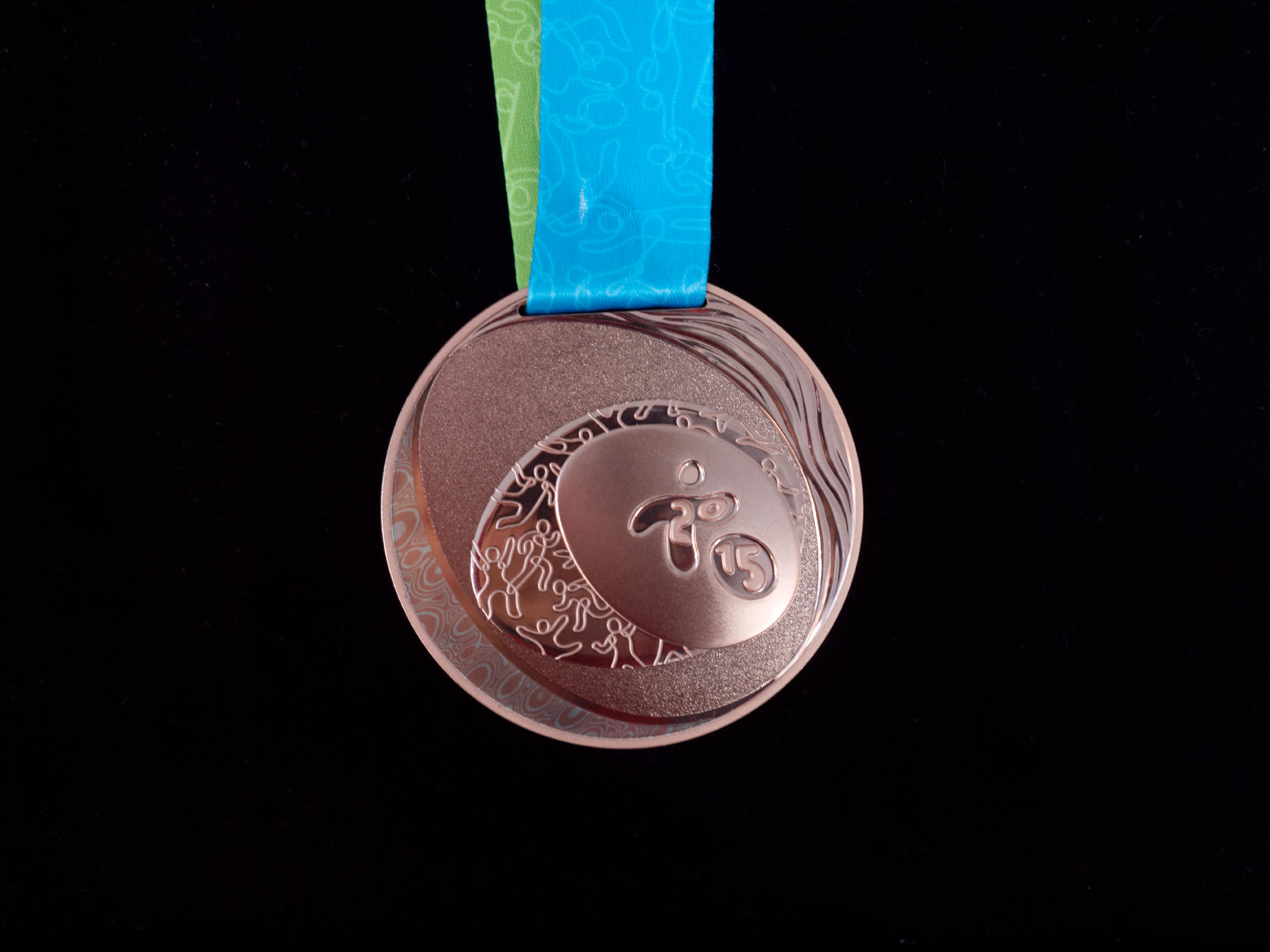
Bronze medal

=== Medals ===
In October 2013, it was announced that the medals for the games would be produced and designed by the Royal Canadian Mint. In September 2014, it was announced that the supplier of the raw minerals used in the medals (over 4,000 in total) would be Toronto-based Barrick Gold. All the materials used in the medals will come from the company's operations in the Pan American region. The copper was mined at the company's Zaldivar mine in Chile, the silver at the Pueblo Viejo mine in the Dominican Republic and the gold was mined at the Hemlo mine in northwestern Ontario in the Unorganized Thunder Bay District near Thunder Bay.

The designs of the medals were revealed on 3 March 2015, at a ceremony at the Royal Ontario Museum. The design of the medals for the first time in an international able-bodied multi-sport event included braille. The medals are roughly 86.7 millimetres (3.41 in) in diameter and weigh about 350 grams (12 oz). The artist of the medals is Christi Belcourt, a Métis visual artist and author. There are three shapes on the front of the medal representing North America, Central America and the Caribbean, and South America, the three regions that competed at the games, while also giving a feel and texture of the medal podium. The back of the medal represents the logo and motto of the games and the design also includes elements and techniques of mokume-gane that gives the medals the appearance of having wood grain.

=== Torch relay ===
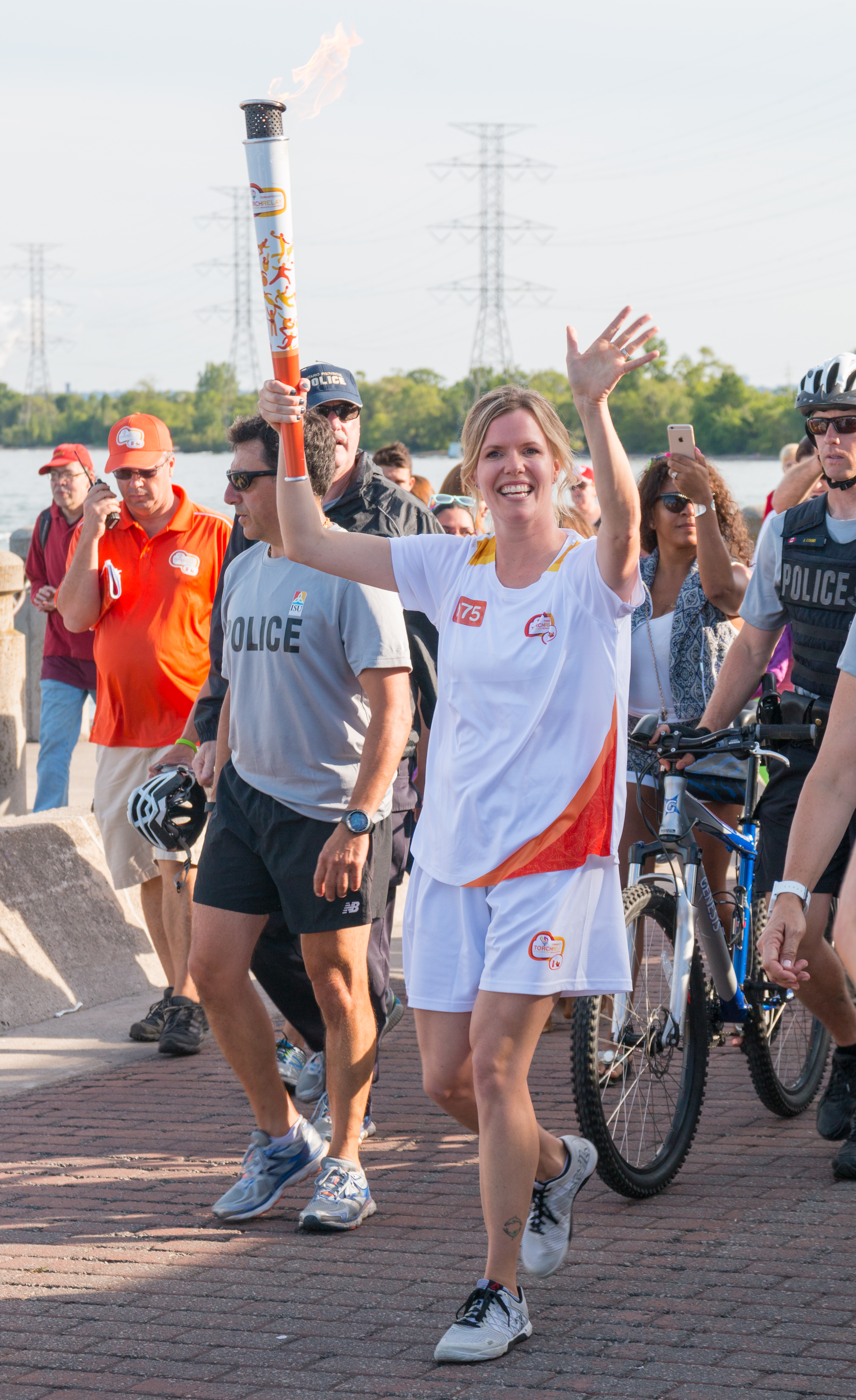
A torchbearer during the relay

An application period for Canadians to carry the torch opened in October 2014 and continued until December. Anyone aged 13 years or older as of May 30, 2015 was eligible to become a torchbearer. Most of the torchbearers were selected by a random selection, while the others were selected by torch relay communities and games partners.

The torch took a 41-day journey after being lit in May 2015 at the pyramids of Teotihuacan, Mexico State northeast of Mexico City. The torch was brought through a total of 130 communities, mostly in Ontario (with five outside the province: Richmond, Winnipeg, Calgary, Halifax and Montreal). The torch was carried by about 3,000 torchbearers and travelled approximately 20,000 kilometres (12,000 mi). The relay began on May 30, 2015, in Toronto and finished on July 10, the date of the opening ceremony.

The detailed torch relay route and celebration sites were announced on February 24, 2015. The torch arrived in Toronto and then headed to Thunder Bay before visiting all other communities on the route. The relay also visited five National Historic Sites of Canada, six Canadian Forces bases and one provincial park. There were 180 celebrations across the torch relay route.

== The Games ==
=== Opening ceremony ===
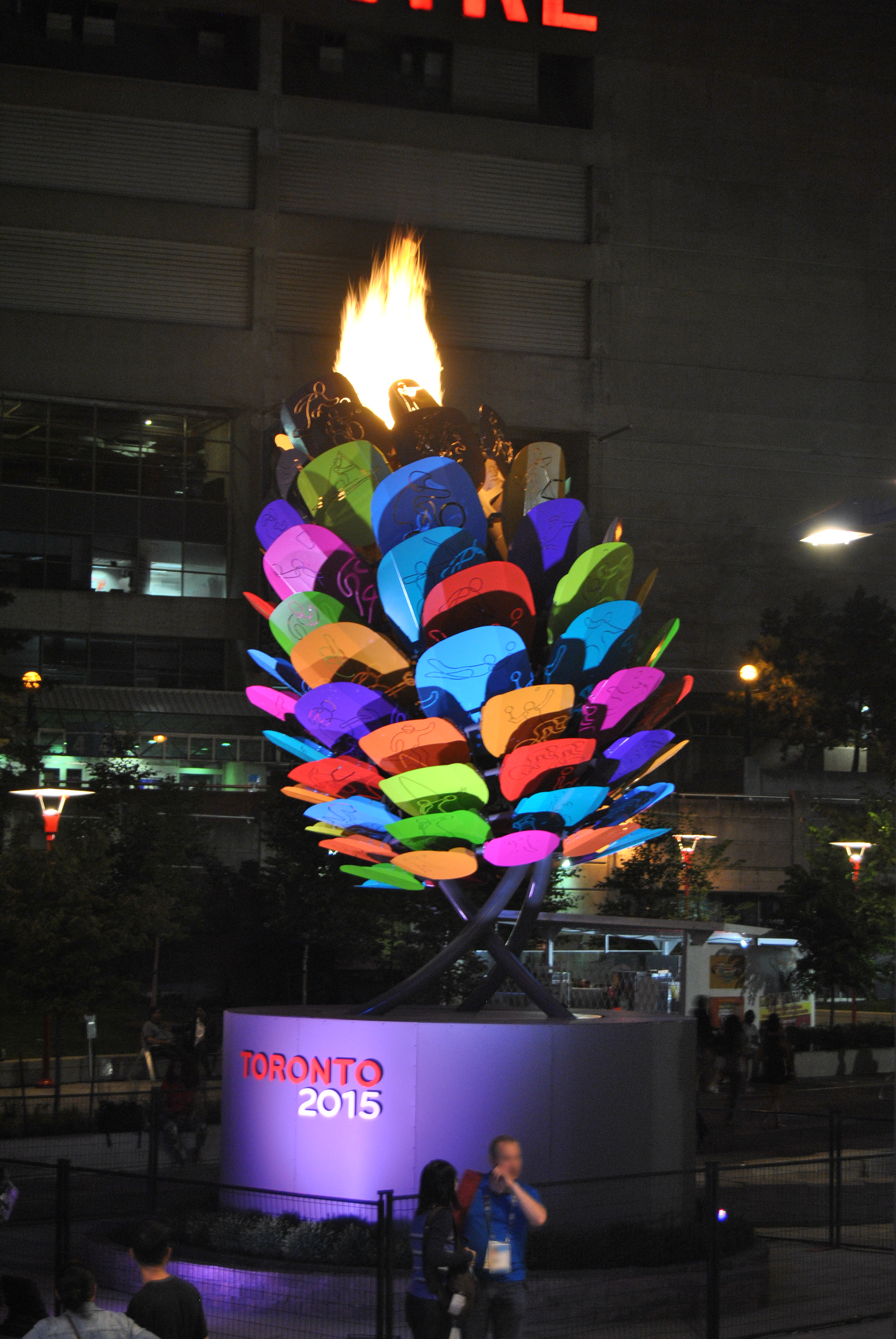
The 2015 Toronto Pan American Games Cauldron located next to the Pan Am Dome

The opening ceremony of the 2015 Pan American Games took place on Friday, 10 July 2015, beginning at 8:00 p.m. EDT at Rogers Centre. The opening ceremony was produced and directed by Cirque du Soleil. The production became the largest event produced by the company.

Governor General David Johnston officially opened the games. Meanwhile, basketball player Steve Nash was the person who lit the cauldron. Nash ran outside the stadium at the end of the ceremony, where he ignited a bowl, which transferred the fire to the official cauldron. The ceremony concluded with a fireworks display shot off the CN Tower, and all the performers back on stage to celebrate.

=== Closing ceremony ===
The closing ceremony took place on Sunday July 26, 2015, beginning at 8:00 p.m. EDT at Rogers Centre. The closing ceremony was produced and directed jointly by B5C Productions, BaAM Productions and FiveCurrents, in association with Live Nation. It featured cultural presentations and the formal handover to Lima, host of the 2019 Pan American Games. The ceremony featured a closing concert headlined by American rapper and music producer Kanye West, joined by American rapper Pitbull and Canadian musician Serena Ryder.

The choice of West as a headliner was criticized by Mayor John Tory and other residents, who argued that it should have been headlined by a Canadian musician.

=== Participating nations ===
All 41 nations of PASO competed, one fewer than in the 2011 Pan American Games, as the Netherlands Antilles Olympic Committee was dissolved in 2011.

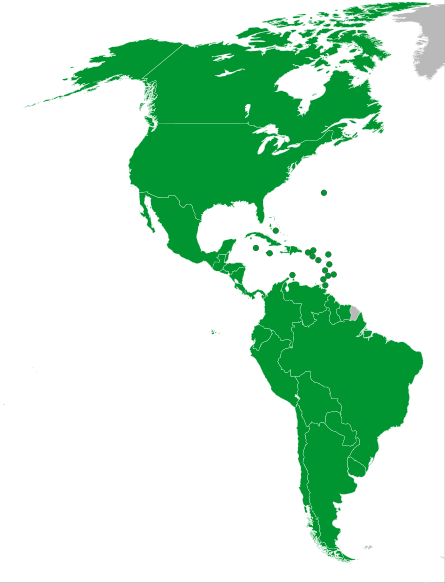
Participating countries.

Participating National Olympic Committees
- Antigua and Barbuda (10)
- Argentina (472)
- Aruba (25)
- Bahamas (39)
- Barbados (29)
- Belize (3)
- Bermuda (16)
- Bolivia (34)
- Brazil (592)
- British Virgin Islands (6)
- Canada (723) (hosts)
- Cayman Islands (7)
- Chile (306)
- Colombia (294)
- Costa Rica (77)
- Cuba (444)
- Dominica (5)
- Dominican Republic (231)
- Ecuador (169)
- El Salvador (52)
- Grenada (7)
- Guatemala (147)
- Guyana (22)
- Haiti (11)
- Honduras (19)
- Jamaica (56)
- Mexico (511)
- Nicaragua (49)
- Panama (44)
- Paraguay (49)
- Peru (157)
- Puerto Rico (252)
- Saint Lucia (6)
- Saint Kitts and Nevis (8)
- Saint Vincent and the Grenadines (5)
- Suriname (9)
- Trinidad and Tobago (111)
- United States (624)
- Uruguay (130)
- Venezuela (358)
- Virgin Islands (18)

==== Number of athletes by National Olympic Committee ====
NOC Code	Nation	Number of athletes
CAN	Canada (hosts)	723
USA	United States	624
BRA	Brazil	592
MEX	Mexico	511
ARG	Argentina	472
CUB	Cuba	444
VEN	Venezuela	358
CHI	Chile	306
COL	Colombia	294
PUR	Puerto Rico	252
DOM	Dominican Republic	231
ECU	Ecuador	169
PER	Peru	157
GUA	Guatemala	147
URU	Uruguay	130
TRI	Trinidad and Tobago	111
CRC	Costa Rica	77
JAM	Jamaica	56
ESA	El Salvador	52
NCA	Nicaragua	49
PAR	Paraguay	49
PAN	Panama	44
BAH	Bahamas	39
BOL	Bolivia	34
BAR	Barbados	29
ARU	Aruba	25
GUY	Guyana	22
HON	Honduras	19
ISV	Virgin Islands	18
BER	Bermuda	16
HAI	Haiti	11
ANT	Antigua and Barbuda	10
SUR	Suriname	9
SKN	Saint Kitts and Nevis	8
CAY	Cayman Islands	7
GRN	Grenada	7
IVB	British Virgin Islands	6
LCA	Saint Lucia	6
DMA	Dominica	5
VIN	Saint Vincent and the Grenadines	5
BIZ	Belize	3

=== Sports ===
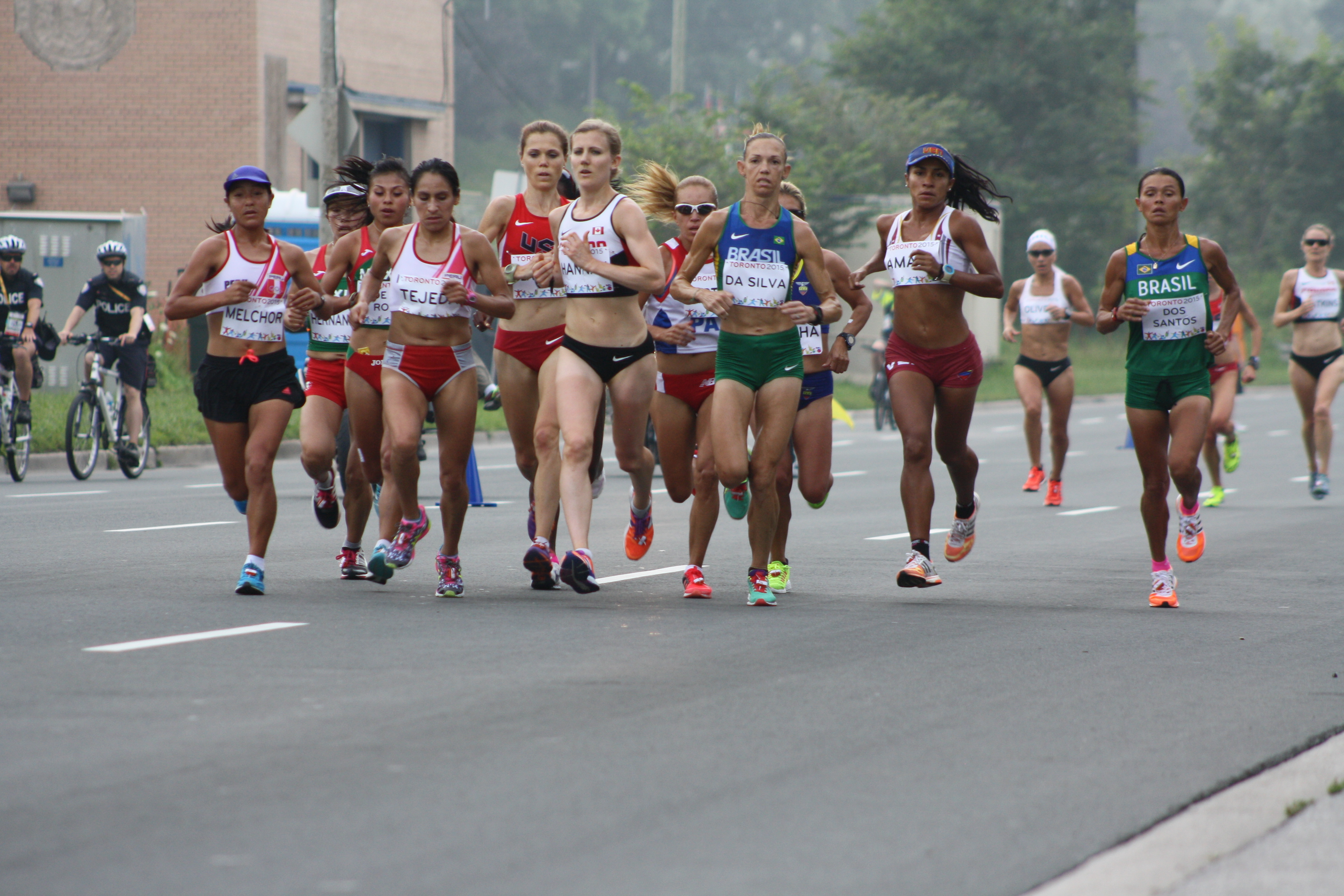
The lead pack in the 2015 Pan American Games women's marathon

A total of 36 sports, 51 disciplines and 364 medal events were contested in these Games. A record 19 sports were direct or indirect (such as opportunities to gain qualification times) qualifiers for the 2016 Summer Olympics in Rio de Janeiro.

Basque pelota was the only sport dropped from the last games. Golf also made its Pan American Games debut, ahead of its reintroduction at Rio 2016. Canoe slalom, the only Olympic discipline never to have been held at the Games, also made its debut, meaning for the first time the entire Olympic sports program was contested. Furthermore, both canoe disciplines had C-1 events for women for the first time. Women's baseball and women's rugby sevens also made their debuts, with men's softball returning to the program, after last being contested in 2003.

Numbers in parentheses indicate the number of medal events to be contested in each sport/discipline.

- Aquatics
  - Diving (8)
  - Open water swimming (2)
  - Swimming (32)
  - Synchronized swimming (2)
  - Water polo (2)
- Archery (4)
- Athletics (47)
- Badminton (5)
- Baseball (2)
- Basketball (2)
- Boxing (13)
- Bowling (4)
- Canoeing
  - Canoe sprint (13)
  - Slalom canoeing (5)
- Cycling
  - BMX racing (2)
  - Mountain biking (2)
  - Road cycling (4)
  - Track cycling (10)
- Equestrian
  - Dressage (2)
  - Eventing (2)
  - Jumping (2)
- Fencing (12)
- Field hockey (2)
- Football (2)
- Golf (3)
- Gymnastics
  - Artistic gymnastics (14)
  - Rhythmic gymnastics (8)
  - Trampoline (2)
- Handball (2)
- Judo (14)
- Karate (10)
- Modern pentathlon (2)
- Racquetball (6)
- Roller sports
  - Artistic roller skating (2)
  - Inline speed skating (6)
- Rowing (14)
- Rugby sevens (2)
- Sailing (10)
- Shooting (15)
- Softball (2)
- Squash (6)
- Table tennis (4)
- Taekwondo (8)
- Tennis (5)
- Triathlon (2)
- Volleyball
  - Beach volleyball (2)
  - Volleyball (2)
- Water skiing
  - Water skiing (8)
  - Wakeboarding (1)
- Weightlifting (15)
- Wrestling
  - Freestyle wrestling (12)
  - Greco-Roman wrestling (6)

=== Calendar ===
In the following calendar of events, each blue box represents an event competition, such as a qualification round, on that day. The yellow boxes represent days during which medal-awarding finals for a sport were held. The number in each box represents the number of finals that were contested on that day. Events began three days before the opening ceremony on July 7 and ended with the closing ceremony on July 26.

OC	Opening ceremony	●	Event competitions	1	Event finals	CC	Closing ceremony

July		7 Tue	8 Wed	9 Thu	10 Fri	11 Sat	12 Sun	13 Mon	14 Tue	15 Wed	16 Thu	17 Fri	18 Sat	19 Sun	20 Mon	21 Tue	22 Wed	23 Thu	24 Fri	25 Sat	26 Sun	Events
Ceremonies (opening / closing)					OC																CC	—N/a
Aquatics
Aquatics	Diving				●	2	2	4														8
Aquatics	Open water swimming					1	1															2
Aquatics	Swimming								6	7	5	8	6									32
Aquatics	Synchronized swimming			●		2																2
Aquatics	Water polo	●	●	●		●	●	●	1	1												2
Archery									●	●	●	2	2									4
Athletics													1	2		9	8	8	10	8	1	47
Badminton						●	●	●	●	2	3											5
Baseball						●	●	●	●	●	●	●	●	1	●	●	●	●	●	●	1	2
Basketball											●	●	●	●	1	●	●	●	●	1		2
Beach volleyball								●	●	●	●	●	●	●	●	2						2
Bowling																	●	2	●	2		4
Boxing													●	●	●	●	●	●	6	7		13
Canoeing	Slalom												●	5								5
Canoeing	Sprint					1	1	5	6													13
Cycling	BMX				●	2																2
Cycling	Mountain biking						2															2
Cycling	Road																2			2		4
Cycling	Track										3	2	2	3								10
Equestrian	Dressage					●	1		1													2
Equestrian	Eventing											●	●	2								2
Equestrian	Jumping															●		1		1		2
Fencing															2	2	2	2	2	2		12
Field hockey								●	●	●	●	●	●		●	●	●	●	1	1		2
Football						●	●	●	●	●	●	●	●	●	●	●	●	●	●	1	1	2
Golf											●	●	●	3								3
Gymnastics	Artistic					1	1	2	5	5												14
Gymnastics	Rhythmic											●	2	3	3							8
Gymnastics	Trampoline												●	2								2
Handball											●	●	●	●	●	●	●	●	1	1		2
Judo						3	3	4	4													14
Karate																		3	3	4		10
Modern pentathlon													1	1								2
Racquetball														●	●	●	●	●	4	●	2	6
Roller sports						●	4	4														8
Rowing						●	●	4	5	5												14
Rugby sevens						●	2															2
Sailing							●	●	●	●	●	●	5	5								10
Shooting							2	3	1	2	1	2	2	2								15
Softball							●	●	●	●	●	●	1	●	●	●	●	●	●	●	1	2
Squash						●	●	2	2	●	●	2										6
Table tennis														●	●	2	●	●	●	2		4
Taekwondo														2	2	2	2					8
Tennis					●	●	●	●	●	3	2											5
Triathlon						1	1															2
Volleyball											●	●	●	●	●	●	●	●	●	1	1	2
Water skiing															●	●	3	6				9
Weightlifting						3	3	3	3	3												15
Wrestling										4	5	5	4									18
Total events						16	23	31	34	32	19	21	26	31	8	17	17	22	27	33	7	364
Cumulative total						16	39	70	104	136	155	176	202	233	241	258	275	297	324	357	364	—N/a
July		7 Tue	8 Wed	9 Thu	10 Fri	11 Sat	12 Sun	13 Mon	14 Tue	15 Wed	16 Thu	17 Fri	18 Sat	19 Sun	20 Mon	21 Tue	22 Wed	23 Thu	24 Fri	25 Sat	26 Sun	Events

=== Medal table ===
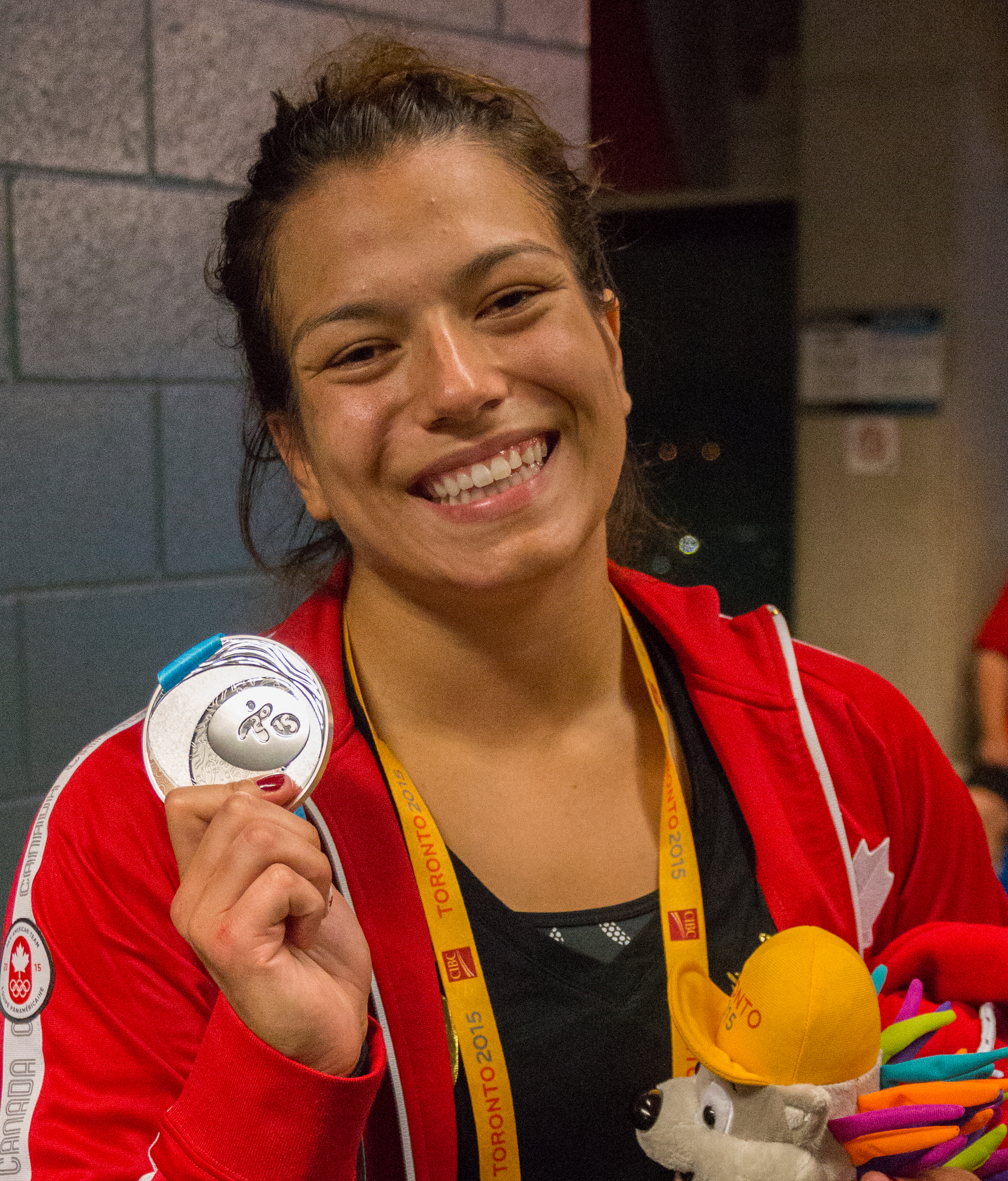
Justina Di Stasio, of Canada, wrestling silver medalist

The United States won the most medals with a total of 265. Canada, the host country, won 219 medals. Other notable mentions include Saint Lucia winning its first Pan American gold medal.

Key

* Host nation (Canada)

Rank	NOC	Gold	Silver	Bronze	Total
1	United States	103	82	80	265
2	Canada*	78	70	71	219
3	Brazil	42	39	60	141
4	Cuba	36	27	34	97
5	Colombia	27	14	31	72
6	Mexico	22	30	43	95
7	Argentina	15	29	30	74
8	Venezuela	8	22	20	50
9	Ecuador	7	9	16	32
10	Guatemala	6	1	3	10
11–31	Remaining NOCs	22	39	69	130
Totals (31 entries)		366	362	457	1,185

=== Anti-doping ===
Athletes disqualified for doping
Athlete	Nation	Sport	Prohibited substance	Note
Stephanie Bragayrac	Paraguay	Wrestling	Furosemide	
María Luisa Calle	Colombia	Cycling – Road and track	GHRP2	
Astrid Camposeco	Guatemala	Weightlifting	Clenbuterol, boldenone	
Mario Mercedes Castillo	Dominican Republic	Baseball	Dimethylbutylamine	
Cinthya Domínguez	Mexico	Weightlifting	Oxandrolone	
Mauricio Fiol	Peru	Swimming – 200-metre butterfly (silver)	Stanozolol	
Nelson Gomez	Puerto Rico	Baseball	Boldenone	
Jesús González	Venezuela	Weightlifting	Not disclosed	
Christopher Guajardo	Chile	Athletics – Marathon	EPO	
Elverine Jimenez	Nicaragua	Wrestling	DHEA	
Patrick Mendes	Brazil	Weightlifting	4-Chlorodehydromethyltestosterone	
Sheila Ocasio	Puerto Rico	Volleyball	Stanozolol	
Javier Jesus Ortiz Angulo	Colombia	Baseball	Stanozolol	
Carlos Oyarzún	Chile	Cycling – Road	FG-4592	
María Pastuña	Ecuador	Athletics – 10,000 metres, 5,000 metres	Nandrolone	
Richard Peralta Robledo	Panama	Football	Clostebol	
Rene Silva Rios	Nicaragua	Wrestling	Boldenone	
Gladys Tejeda	Peru	Athletics – Marathon (gold)	Furosemide	
Luz Vázquez	Argentina	Wrestling – Freestyle 69 kg (bronze)	Unspecified hormone and metabolic modulator	
Merin Zalazar	Honduras	Boxing	Furosemide	

== Media ==
=== Accreditation ===
A total of 1,232 media personnel were accredited with covering the games, including broadcast, press and photographers.

=== Broadcasting ===
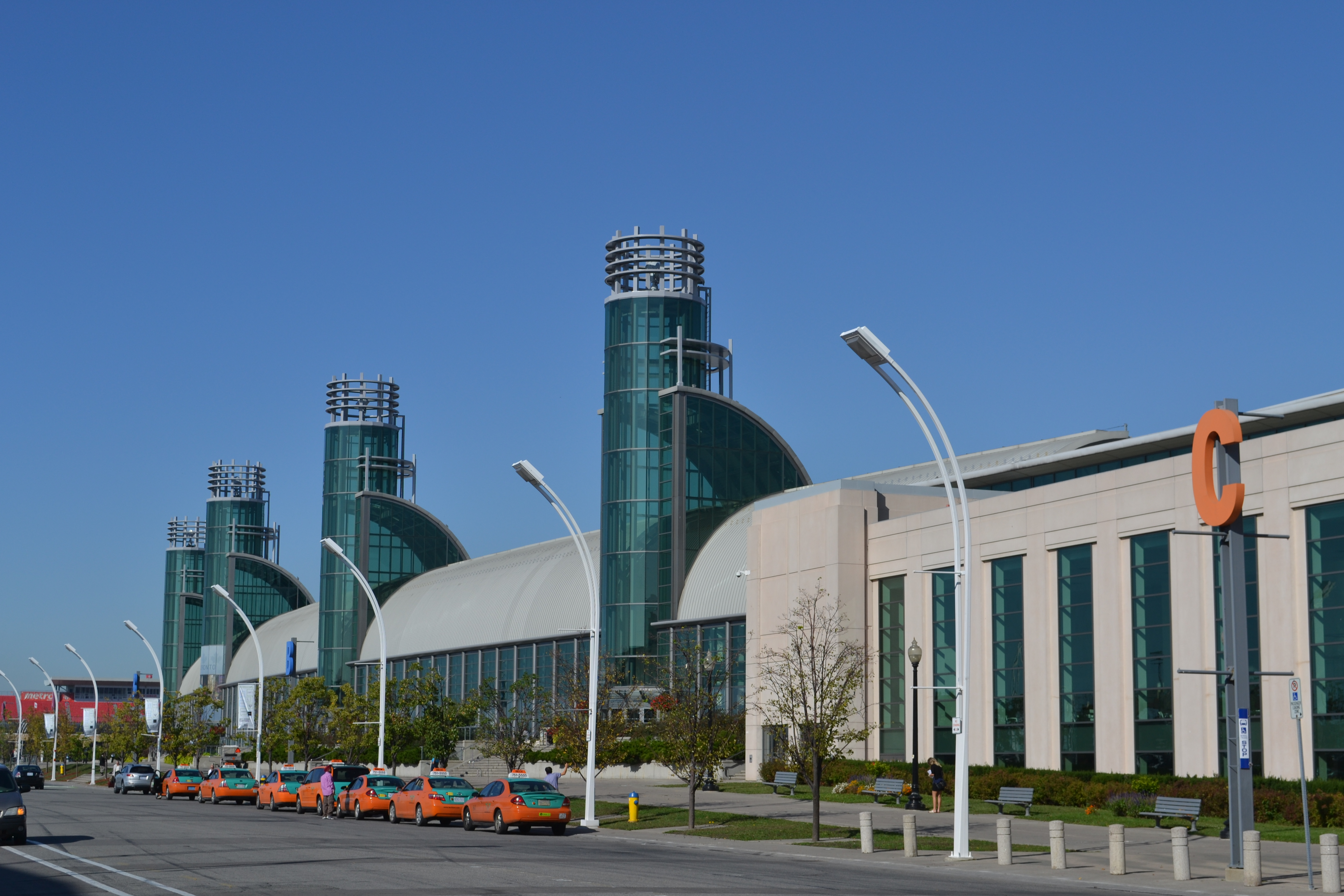
Enercare Centre (Exhibition Centre) in Exhibition Place hosted broadcasting facilities for the Games.

The Canadian Broadcasting Corporation (CBC) served as the host and domestic broadcaster of the 2015 Pan American Games; locally, coverage was broadcast in the English and French languages by CBC Television and Ici Radio-Canada Télé, and CBC's website carried 650 hours of online coverage. Pay television rights were sub-licensed to Sportsnet, which aired the football (soccer) tournaments, and a semi-final of the Men's basketball tournament that involved Canada. Spanish language rights were sub-licensed to Telelatino and Univision Canada; the broadcaster collaborated with US Spanish-language rights-holder ESPN Deportes on its own coverage. CBC stated that it was "very happy" with the ratings performance of the Games; primetime coverage averaged around 900,000 to 1 million viewers per night, and the opening ceremonies were seen by 1.93 million viewers across CBC and CBC News Network, with the largest audience being in the Toronto region.

In the United States, ESPN held broadcast rights, with 66 hours of English-language coverage across ESPN and ESPN2, 44 hours on Longhorn Network, 200 hours of Spanish-language coverage on ESPN Deportes, and streaming on WatchESPN. ESPN broadcast from studios at Corus Quay, which was linked to the IBC (and in turn, ESPN's headquarters in Bristol, Connecticut). ESPN and ESPN Deportes used their own hosts, as well as those of CBC, as part of its multi-platform coverage.

Rede Record acquired rights in Brazil, paying a record US$30 million. Other broadcasting deals include Torneos y Competencias sports in Argentina, Claro Sports in Mexico and Latina Televisión in Peru.

== Marketing ==
=== Logo ===
The original bid logo for the games

Toronto's bid logo was launched on October 2, 2008, with the then–Toronto mayor David Miller and then-head of the organizing committee David Peterson unveiling the logo to the public. The bid logo looks like an abstract maple leaf with three sections, each section made up of two strokes in the shape of a "v" with a spot in the centre. The colours are green, red and blue. This was the official logo of the games until 2010, when the new logo was launched.

On September 29, 2010, the official logo of the games was unveiled at a street party at Maple Leaf Square. According to Ian Troop, the former chief executive officer of Toronto 2015 organizing committee, the logo is designed on the basis of the different art styles seen throughout the 41 countries that compete at the games.

=== Mascot ===
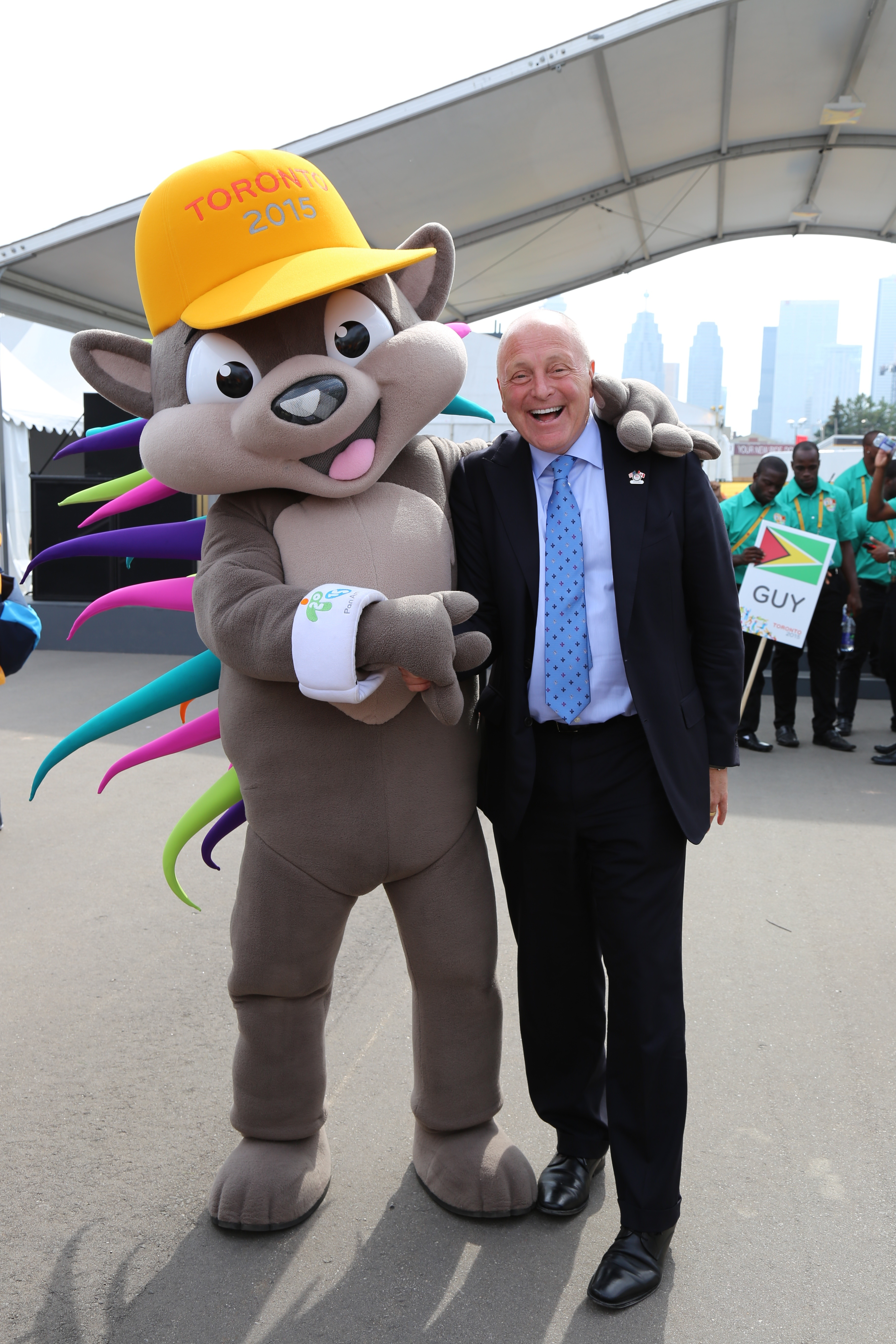
Pachi greets US Ambassador Bruce Heyman at the 2015 Pan American Games

In January 2013, it was announced that a contest would determine the mascot of the games. Children under the age of 16 had until March 8, 2013, to submit their ideas. 4,000 ideas and drawings were submitted to the organizing committee during this time frame. In April 2013, a shortlist of six mascot designs (which were produced by professional graphic designers with the sketches by the children as models) were released, including a raccoon, beaver, moose, two pixie creature twins, porcupine and an owl. The final six were selected based on originality, how well they represent Canadian culture and the branding of the Games, and the appeal they had amongst adults and children. On April 22, 2013, the general public was allowed to vote for the mascot they felt was the best. Voting was open until May 5, 2013.

On July 17, 2013, Pachi the Porcupine was revealed as the official mascot of the games at an unveiling at the Canadian Broadcasting Centre. The mascot received over 33,000 votes from the nationwide vote. The winning design was submitted by four Grade-Eight students at Buttonville Public School in Markham. The name Pachi (ぱち) means "clapping with joy" in Japanese, while the 41 quills the porcupine has represent the 41 participating countries at the games. The New York Times described the mascot as "a departure from the usual cute and cuddly" and "a marketing challenge". The Games licensed "Inner Ninja" by Canadian rapper Classified as Pachi's theme song.

=== Music ===
The event's official theme song was released in three versions: the English-language "Together We Are One", performed by Serena Ryder; the French "Ensemble on est immense", performed by Jasmine Denham; and the Spanish "Unidos Somos Más", performed by Eva Avila.

=== Toronto Sign ===
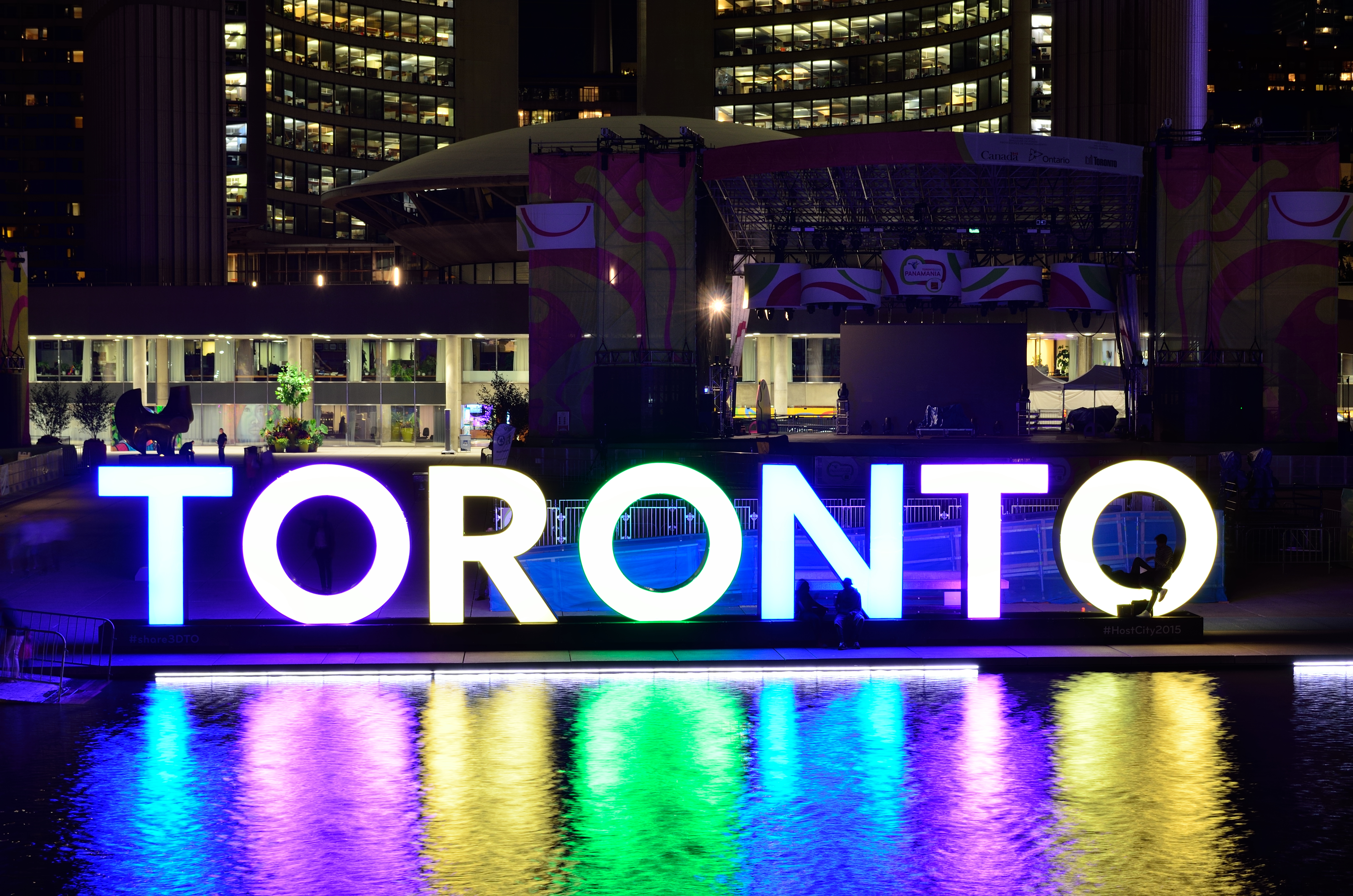
The Toronto Sign placed in Nathan Phillips Square for the Games became a symbol of their positive response and of the city as a whole.

A large, illuminated "Toronto" sculpture sign installed in Nathan Phillips Square for the Games proved to be popular with locals and tourists as a spot for photos, and it came to become a symbol of the renewed enthusiasm surrounding the Pan Am Games. Considering it a symbol of their legacy, Mayor of Toronto John Tory solicited suggestions for a permanent location for the sign following the Games. It was later announced that the sign would remain in the Square in its current form through at least the end of 2016 and later extended to the end of 2017 with the temporary addition of a maple leaf for the 150th anniversary of Canadian confederation and 2018 with a pan-First Nations medicine wheel. In September 2020, the sign was replaced with a new permanent version, adding weatherproofing and an updated lighting system.

=== Sponsorship ===
Private sponsors included Chevrolet Canada. Another sponsorship deal with CAA South Central Ontario announced in January 2014 was terminated in May 2014.

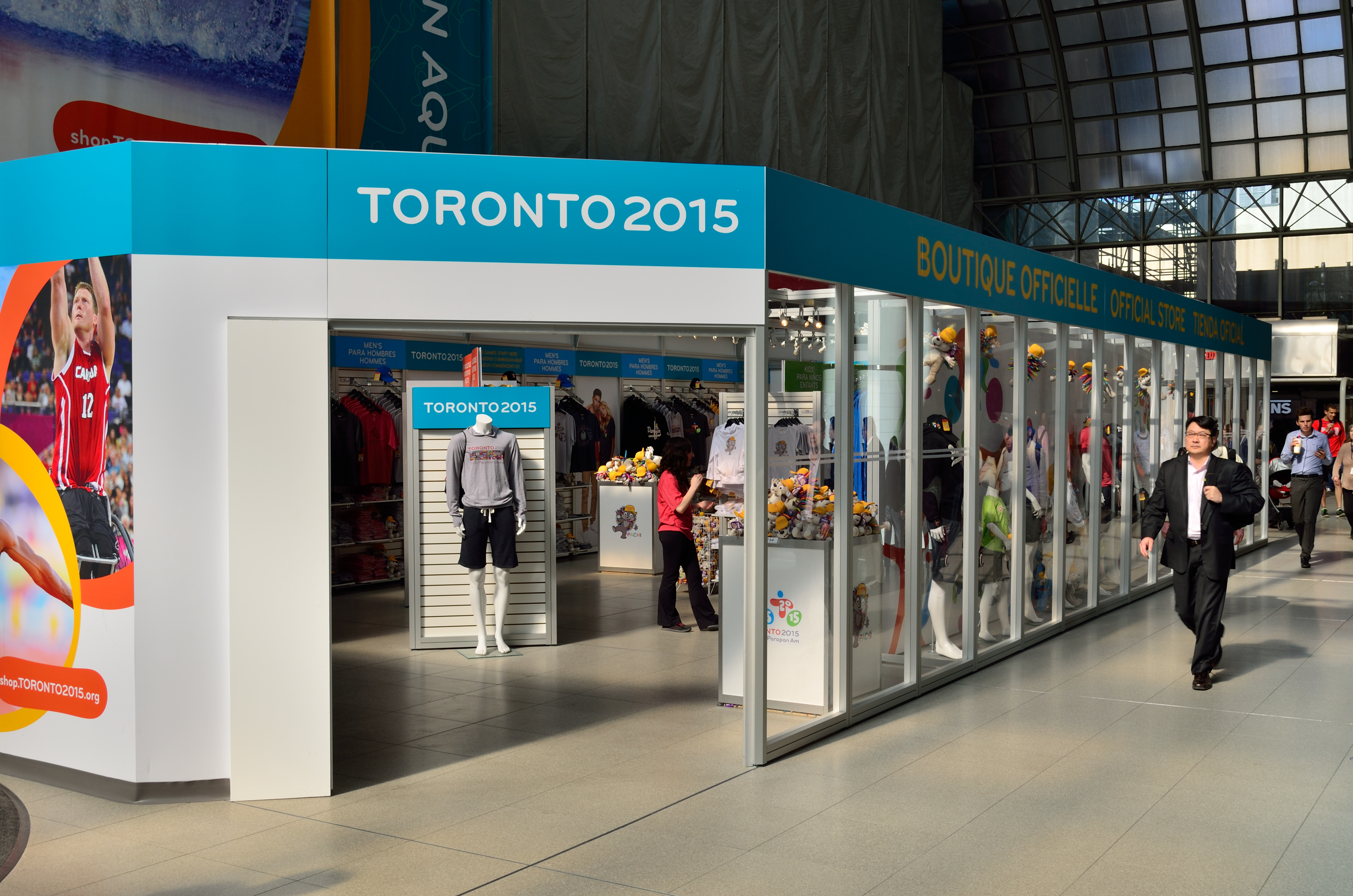
The Toronto 2015 pop-up store at Toronto Eaton Centre.

Sponsors of the 2015 Pan American Games
Lead Partner
- Canadian Imperial Bank of Commerce (CIBC)
Premier Partners
- Atos
- Chevrolet
- Cisco
- Live Nation Entertainment
- President's Choice
- Ontario Lottery and Gaming Corporation
Official Suppliers
- Aeroplan
- Aggreko
- Allstream Inc.
- ArcelorMittal (Dofasco)
- Atoma
- Barrick Gold
- Beanfield Metroconnect
- Cadillac Fairview
- Cineplex Entertainment
- CN Tower
- Coca-Cola
- Corus Entertainment
- DB Schenker
- Esso
- Fuse Marketing Group
- Garrett Metal Detectors
- General Mills
- Maytag
- Molson Brewery
- Ontario Trillium Foundation
- Pattison Outdoor Advertising
- Porter Airlines
- Royal Canadian Mint
- Scalar
- Siemens
- Sword Security
- Technogym
- Toronto Hydro
- Toronto Pearson International Airport
- Toronto Star
Supporters
- ATCO
- Bochner Eye Institute
- BT/A Advertising
- Burnbrae Farms
- The Canadian Press
- Carbon60
- The Carpenters’ Union
- CGC Inc.
- Division Sports-Rep
- Eleiko
- EllisDon - Ledcor
- Esri
- eSSENTIAL Accessibility
- Freeman Audio Visual
- Gateman Milloy
- George Brown College
- Gerflor
- Gold Medal Systems
- La Presse
- LifeLabs
- MAC Cosmetics
- Minavox
- Modu-loc Fence Rentals
- Morningstar Hospitality Services
- Nautique Boats
- ONroute
- Ontario Highway 407
- Ontario Power Generation
- PortsToronto
- Riedel Communications
- Roots Canada
- Rosetta Stone Inc.
- S4OPTIK
- SpiderTech
- Sportsnet
- Starwood Hotels and Resorts
- TBM Service Group
- TLN
- Toronto Port Lands Company
- Union Pearson Express
- Via Rail
- Vision Critical
- VOIT
- Waste Management, Inc.
- W. W. Grainger (Acklands-Grainger)
- Yonex
- YouAchieve
- ZOLL

== Concerns and controversies ==
=== Scheduling ===
The aquatics events at the 2015 Pan American Games were scheduled to be held roughly around the same time as the 2015 World Aquatics Championships scheduled in Kazan, Russia. In order to maintain the quality of its fields, the schedule of the five aquatics disciplines had to be changed to accommodate athletes. The synchronized swimming competition was moved to the day before the opening ceremony, diving events began on the day of the opening ceremony (when events are traditionally not held on the day of the ceremony), open water swimming was moved to the first weekend of the games, swimming was reduced to a five-day schedule (down from seven in 2011), and water polo competitions began three days before the opening ceremony. All events were scheduled to be completed by July 24, six days before the opening ceremonies of the World Championships, which in itself was moved back a week to accommodate the games. The change in schedule meant that for the first time, events were held before the opening ceremony.

The 2015 FIFA Women's World Cup, which was held in various Canadian cities, concluded on the Sunday prior to the opening ceremony; due to the proximity of the events, teams who competed in both the Women's World Cup and the Pan Am women's football tournament were not expected to field their best players due to availability. Toronto decided not to bid to host matches during the Women's World Cup due to a potential conflict with the Games.

The 2015 World Archery Championships were scheduled later in July, to avoid conflict with the games, while the 2015 World Fencing Championships (which finished one day prior to the start of fencing competitions at the Pan-Am Games) were coordinated to allow athletes to compete at both events. Finally, the second round of the 2015 Davis Cup was moved ahead one week to avoid conflict with the tennis competitions. Tennis competitions were held before the opening ceremony, to allow athletes to compete in both events.

The volleyball tournaments and the FIVB Volleyball World Grand Prix and the FIVB Volleyball World League were played at roughly the same time, leading to scheduling conflicts for teams playing both events.

The IndyCar Series' Honda Indy Toronto race (later renamed Grand Prix of Toronto), which is held on a street circuit at Exhibition Place, was moved to June from July to avoid conflicting with the Games.

=== Expenses claims ===
In September 2013, it was reported that many senior members of the organizing committee, including then-CEO Ian Troop, expensed Ontario taxpayers for things such as a cup of tea. This led to outrage among provincial politicians including Ontario Premier Kathleen Wynne, "I'm just going to say it's ridiculous. It is the kind of entitlement that is unacceptable". In response to the backlash the organization released an updated expenses and travel policy in November 2013. In December 2013, Troop was ousted by the organization's board of directors, just three months after the expense scandal came into light. He was replaced by Saad Rafi. In 2014, more expenses by the organization came under scrutiny including boxes of South American wine.

In 2015, Ian Troop, the former CEO, gave an interview in which he stated that organizers cleared him from any wrongdoing, and that all expenses fell under the organization's policy. Troop also mentioned under his leadership the organization saved CA$50 million from the capital infrastructure budget. Troop's firing had nothing to do with the expenses scandal that arose in 2013.

=== Executive compensation and bonuses ===
The games' organizing committee came under scrutiny for the high compensation and bonus packages its executive team has been awarded. Under Ontario's Salary Disclosure rules, any provincial employee receiving over CA$100,000 in compensation will have their salary publicly disclosed. In 2012, it was revealed that former CEO Ian Troop made CA$552,065, with several other senior staff making between CA$100,000 and CA$400,000. Additionally, in 2013 it was revealed that as part of his compensation package, Troop would be eligible for a CA$780,000 bonus at the end of his contract, if the games had finished successfully. Other executives are eligible for bonuses of up to 100 percent of their salaries upon completion of their contract. In 2015, it was revealed that Troop's replacement, Saad Rafi, would receive a bonus of 100 percent of his CA$428,794 salary upon completion of his contract. Rafi did not collect his bonus at the conclusion of the games.

=== Canadian television coverage ===
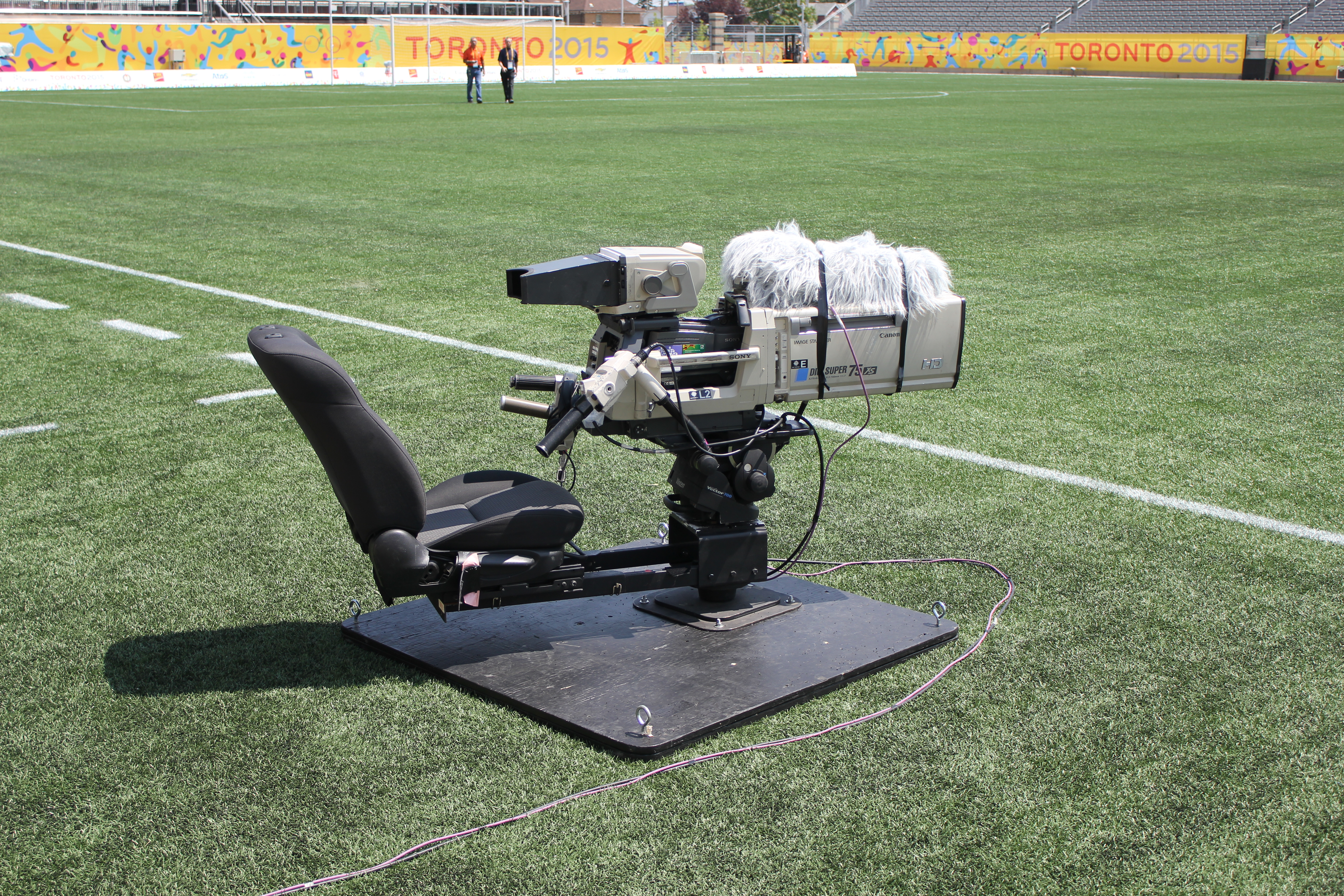
TV Camera in Hamilton soccer coveridge

Although still billed as having been the most extensive television coverage of the Pan American Games ever broadcast in the country, the CBC faced criticism for the amount of coverage it produced and broadcast from the 2015 Pan American Games. Only condensed, tape-delayed highlights of events aired on CBC Television, drawing comparisons to the similar practices imposed by NBC's coverage of the Olympics. Most events were streamed online, and pay television channel Sportsnet aired the soccer tournaments on television, but events in some sports received only limited online coverage or were not broadcast at all. Partway through the Games, the CBC expanded its primetime coverage block, while broadcasts of a semi-final game in men's basketball on Sportsnet and the baseball finals online were added at the last minute. Critics perceived these last-minute changes as signs that the CBC had underestimated viewer interest in the Pan Am Games.

CBC Sports head of programming Trevor Pilling explained that the large number of events being held, along with the stature of the Pan American Games in comparison to the Olympics, were a factor in the structure of CBC's coverage, stating that "I do think we are the victim of our own success in that having Olympic coverage that is around the clock, but the Olympics are a different event than these Pan Am Games. But I feel like we've done the athletes justice by telling those stories or through live coverage, or with reporters on site. We've tried to make sure we're at all the significant events, and with Canada winning over 180 medals, that's a tall task."

While the National Post also felt that budget cuts faced by the CBC in recent years, including those imposed following the loss of its national broadcast rights to the National Hockey League to Rogers Media, may have also had an impact—with a CBC spokesperson arguing that "resources" were a factor, Pilling denied that this was the case, arguing that it was "about the planning, It is about making good, sound business decisions", and promised that there would be extensive coverage of the 2016 Summer Olympics in Rio de Janeiro.

Preceded by Guadalajara	XVII Pan American Games; Toronto (2015)	Succeeded by Lima
