= Ian Troop =

Ian Troop BBA

Former chief executive officer of Toronto Organizing Committee for the 2015 Pan and Parapan American Games
- In office February 11, 2010 – December 13, 2013

Personal details
- Born: Georgetown, Ontario
- Education: Wilfrid Laurier University; Kipling Collegiate Institute
- Profession: Chief executive officer

Ian Troop was the former president and chief executive officer of TO2015, which managed the preparation and execution of the 2015 Pan American Games and 2015 Parapan American Games. Prior to his appointment as the CEO of TO2015, Troop was President of ConAgra Foods, and a vice president at Procter & Gamble.

Troop also served on the advisory board of the National Hockey League Players' Association (NHLPA). In 2006 and 2007 the National Post named Troop one of Canada's top CEOs of the future.

In 1981 Troop graduated from Wilfrid Laurier University with a BBA. While in university he was an all-star football player and was inducted to the Laurier hall of fame in 1978. He was drafted by the Hamilton Tiger-Cats of the Canadian Football League in 1981. In 2009, he was named Wilfrid Laurier Alumni of the year, and in 2011 one of the top 100 WLU alumni of the past 100 years. In 2012, he was awarded a Queen Elizabeth II Diamond Jubilee medal for his community work.

== 2015 Pan American Games ==
On February 11, 2010 Troop was named the chief executive officer of the organizing committee of the 2015 Pan American Games. Constant venue delays and secrecy surrounding the organization made Troop a target of critics. Additionally, Troop's compensation and bonus structure drew criticism.

On December 13, 2013 the Board of TO2015 fired Troop. He was replaced by Saad Rafi, Ontario Deputy Health Minister. The Games' Chair David Peterson stressed that criticism of Troop was not the cause of his dismissal, stating the Games are "in really great shape." Indeed, Michael Fennel, former president of The Commonwealth Games Federation, and chairman of the PASO Technical Commission praised progress during an October 2013 visit, saying "compared to previous host cities, Toronto is well ahead with plans and preparations". Troop received a severance package worth $534,000. His firing ultimately had nothing to do with the expenses scandal that arose in 2013.

Just before the start of the Games in July 2015, the Hamilton Spectator described Troop as doing ‘all the heavy lifting’ in a ‘precise pivot’, changing two-thirds of the Bid dream plan to create the Games execution plan. Under his leadership, $53 million was saved on a $672 Million capital budget, and sponsorship exceeded the $102 million sponsorship goal by more than $50 million – in total over a $100 million improvement. John Furlong, CEO of the Vancouver Olympics said Troop 'worked his heart out and will always own a piece of these Games. He has his fingerprints all over this event'.

On June 17, 2019 the books were closed on the outcomes of Toronto 2015 Pan Am Games. The Games were underbudget by $38 million, leaving a legacy endowment fund of $60 million and all new facilities functioning well. The majority of experts say that these were the finest games ever held.

Hon. David Peterson, Chair of the 2015 Organizing Committee said, "I'm happy to report that the Games came in under budget by $38 million and have left a remarkable legacy for the people of Ontario.”

“The Games went on without a hitch. They were warmly embraced by the people of Ontario, who, along with people from the United States, South America, Central America and the Caribbean, bought over 1.2 million tickets.”

“I would like to thank the Founding Chairman, Roger Garland, and the Founding CEO, Ian Troop.”

== Sovereign's Medal for Volunteers ==
In 2019 Ian was awarded the Sovereign’s Medal for Volunteers by the Governor General of Canada. The Sovereign’s Medal recognizes the exceptional volunteer achievements of Canadians from across Canada. Ian’s citation from Her Excellency the Right Honourable Julie Payette, Governor General of Canada asserts that "Ian Troop dedicates his expertise and passion for the inclusive economic growth to board positions with the West Park Healthcare Centre Foundation and Halton Poverty Roundtable. His leadership has supported strategic planning and successful fundraising initiatives." He is also chairman of the Halton Community Benefits Network and is the vice chairman of the YMCA Oakville/Halton. Mayor Rick Bonnette of Halton Hills characterizes Ian as a "relentless supporter of the Halton Hills Community".
