= Toronto Organizing Committee for the 2015 Pan and Parapan American Games =

American games committee

Toronto Organizing Committee for the 2015 Pan American and Parapan Games Comité d’organisation des Jeux panaméricains et parapanaméricains de 2015 à Toronto
- Formation: January 21, 2010
- Headquarters: Toronto, Ontario
- Official language: English, French, Spanish
- Chief executive officer: Saad Rafi
- Website: toronto2015.org

The Toronto Organizing Committee for the 2015 Pan Parapan American Games (TO2015) (French: Comité d’organisation des Jeux panaméricains et parapanaméricains de 2015 à Toronto - TOR2015) was a non-profit organization responsible for producing and financing the 2015 Pan American Games and 2015 Parapan American Games. It was established on January 21, 2010, about three months after the 2015 games were awarded to Toronto, Ontario.

TO2015 was led by chief executive officer Ian Troop, who has senior operating experience with multinational corporations. Its board of directors consisted of 12 members, with five partners: the Canadian Olympic Committee, Canadian Paralympic Committee, Canadian and Ontario provincial governments, and the city government of Toronto, Ontario.

The chair of the Games was The Honourable David Peterson, former politician and premier of Ontario. In December 2013 Troop was fired. He was replaced in January 2014 by Saad Rafi.

== Members of the organizing committee ==
The following are members of the organizing committee and their title.

Name	Title
Saad Rafi	Chief executive officer
David Peterson	Chair
Katherine Henderson	Senior vice-president, marketing & revenue
Barbara Anderson	Chief financial officer
Allen Vansen	Senior vice-president, operations
Bob O'Doherty	Senior vice-president, sport and venues
Elaine Roper	Senior vice-president, human resources
Murray Noble	Senior vice-president, infrastructure
Peter Donolo	Senior vice-president, public affairs
Louise Lutgens	Senior vice-president, community and cultural affairs
Karen Hacker	Senior vice-president, general counsel and corporate secretary
Roger Garland	Chairman emeritus

== Board of directors ==
The following are members of the board of directors and what they are known for. The board was selected to represent the five partners in the games: the three governments and the Canadian Olympic Committee and Canadian Paralympic Committee.

Name	Title/accomplishments
The Honourable David Peterson	Chair, former premier of Ontario
Marcel Aubut	President of the Canadian Olympic Committee
Sylvie Bernier	Former Olympic diving champion and Pan American Games medalist
Martha Billes	Controlling shareholder of the Canadian Tire Corporation
Michael Chambers	Former president of the Canadian Olympic Committee
Tony Gagliano	Canadian businessman, entrepreneur and philanthropist
Doug Hamilton	Former Olympics rowing medalist
Sandra Levy	Former Olympic field hockey player and vice president of the Canadian National Institute for the Blind
David Legg	President of the Canadian Paralympic Committee
Walter Sieber	Former vice president of the Canadian Olympic Committee
Victoria Winter	Former Pan American Games medalist in dressage
Joe Halstead	Chairman of Ontario Place, former CEO/chair of Festival Management Committee Scotiabank Caribbean Carnival Toronto (formerly Caribana)
