= Marc Lacelle =

Canadian football player (born 1958)

Profile
- Position: Running back

Personal information
- Born: March 8, 1958 (age 68); Montreal, Quebec, Canada
- Listed height: 5 ft 11 in (1.80 m)
- Listed weight: 205 lb (93 kg)

Career information
- College: McGill

Career history
- 1981: Montreal Alouettes
- 1982: Montreal Concordes

Marc Lacelle (born March 8, 1958, in Montreal, Quebec) is a Canadian former professional football player who played with the Montreal Alouettes and the Montreal Concordes as a running back. Lacelle ran for 254 yards in his career on 69 attempts, scoring 2 rushing touchdowns. He also caught 26 passes for 230 yards and 3 receiving touchdowns and returned 12 kickoffs for 236 yards.
