= Dominic Vetro =

Canadian football player (born 1958)

Profile
- Positions: Wide receiver, Kick returner

Personal information
- Born: May 26, 1958 (age 68); St. Lawrence, Newfoundland, Canada
- Listed height: 5 ft 10 in (1.78 m)
- Listed weight: 180 lb (82 kg)

Career information
- College: Wilfrid Laurier

Career history
- 1981: Montreal Alouettes
- 1982-1983: Montreal Concordes
- 1983: Hamilton Tiger-Cats

Dominic Vetro (born May 26, 1958, in St. Lawrence, Newfoundland) is a Canadian former professional football player who played with the Montreal Alouettes, Montreal Concordes and Hamilton Tiger-Cats as a wide receiver and return specialist. Vetro caught 10 passes for 129 yards and 0 receiving touchdowns in his career. He also returned 29 punts for 337 yards and 22 kickoffs for 480 yards.
